= 2009 Nebraska Cornhuskers football team =

American college football season

2009 Nebraska Cornhuskers football

Big 12 North Division champion Holiday Bowl champion

Big 12 Championship Game, L 12–13 vs. Texas

Holiday Bowl, W 33–0 vs. Arizona
- Conference: Big 12 Conference
- North

Ranking
- Coaches: No. 14
- AP: No. 14
- Record: 10–4 (6–2 Big 12)
- Head coach: Bo Pelini (2nd season)
- Offensive coordinator: Shawn Watson (3rd season)
- Offensive scheme: Spread
- Defensive coordinator: Carl Pelini (2nd season)
- Base defense: 4–2
- Home stadium: Memorial Stadium

Uniform

2009 Big 12 Conference football standings
| | Conf. | | | Overall |
| Team | W | | L | W | | L |
|---|---|---|---|---|---|---|
North Division
| No. 14 Nebraska x | 6 | – | 2 | 10 | – | 4 |
| Missouri | 4 | – | 4 | 8 | – | 5 |
| Kansas State | 4 | – | 4 | 6 | – | 6 |
| Iowa State | 3 | – | 5 | 7 | – | 6 |
| Colorado | 2 | – | 6 | 3 | – | 9 |
| Kansas | 1 | – | 7 | 5 | – | 7 |
South Division
| No. 2 Texas x$ | 8 | – | 0 | 13 | – | 1 |
| Oklahoma State | 6 | – | 2 | 9 | – | 4 |
| No. 21 Texas Tech | 5 | – | 3 | 9 | – | 4 |
| Oklahoma | 5 | – | 3 | 8 | – | 5 |
| Texas A&M | 3 | – | 5 | 6 | – | 7 |
| Baylor | 1 | – | 7 | 4 | – | 8 |
Championship: Texas 13, Nebraska 12
$ – BCS representative as conference champion; x – Division champion/co-champions; Rankings from AP Poll

The 2009 Nebraska Cornhuskers football team represented the University of Nebraska–Lincoln in the 2009 NCAA Division I FBS football season. The Cornhuskers played their home games at Memorial Stadium in Lincoln, Nebraska and were led by head coach Bo Pelini. The Cornhuskers finished the season 10–4, 6–3 in Big 12 and were Big 12 North Division champions and represented the division in the Big 12 Championship Game, where they lost to Texas 13–12. Nebraska was invited to the Holiday Bowl, where they defeated Arizona 33–0.

== Before the season ==
The 2009 Cornhuskers began the regular season on Saturday, September 5, 2009, against the Florida Atlantic Owls. The Cornhuskers were led by second-year head coach Bo Pelini. Pelini previously served as defensive coordinator for LSU and Oklahoma following a season as Nebraska's defensive coordinator in 2003, and was brought back to Nebraska to lead the football program by Nebraska's former head coach and athletic director, Tom Osborne, after the conclusion of the 2007 season.

== Schedule ==
| Date | Time | Opponent | Rank | Site | TV | Result | Attendance |
|---|---|---|---|---|---|---|---|
| September 5 | 6:00 pm | Florida Atlantic* | No. 24 | Memorial Stadium; Lincoln, Nebraska | FSN PPV | W 49–3 | 85,719 |
| September 12 | 1:00 pm | Arkansas State* | No. 22 | Memorial Stadium; Lincoln, Nebraska | FSN PPV | W 38–9 | 85,035 |
| September 19 | 2:30 pm | at No. 13 Virginia Tech* | No. 19 | Lane Stadium; Blacksburg, Virginia | ABC | L 15–16 | 66,233 |
| September 26 | 6:00 pm | Louisiana–Lafayette*^{†} | No. 25 | Memorial Stadium; Lincoln, Nebraska | FSN PPV | W 55–0 | 86,304 |
| October 8 | 8:00 pm | at No. 24 Missouri | No. 21 | Faurot Field; Columbia, Missouri (rivalry) | ESPN | W 27–12 | 65,826 |
| October 17 | 2:30 pm | Texas Tech | No. 15 | Memorial Stadium; Lincoln, Nebraska | ABC/ESPN | L 10–31 | 86,107 |
| October 24 | 11:30 am | Iowa State | | Memorial Stadium; Lincoln, Nebraska (rivalry) | FSN | L 7–9 | 85,938 |
| October 31 | 11:30 am | at Baylor | | Floyd Casey Stadium; Waco, Texas | Versus | W 20–10 | 31,702 |
| November 7 | 7:00 pm | No. 20 Oklahoma | | Memorial Stadium; Lincoln, Nebraska (rivalry) | ABC | W 10–3 | 86,115 |
| November 14 | 2:30 pm | at Kansas | | Memorial Stadium; Lawrence, Kansas (rivalry) | ABC | W 31–17 | 51,525 |
| November 21 | 6:30 pm | Kansas State | | Memorial Stadium; Lincoln, Nebraska (rivalry) | ESPN | W 17–3 | 85,998 |
| November 27 | 2:30 pm | at Colorado | | Folsom Field; Boulder, Colorado (rivalry) | ABC | W 28–20 | 52,817 |
| December 5 | 7:00 pm | vs. No. 3 Texas | No. 21 | Cowboys Stadium; Arlington, Texas (Big 12 Championship Game) | ABC | L 12–13 | 76,211 |
| December 30 | 7:00 pm | vs. No. 22 Arizona* | No. 20 | Qualcomm Stadium; San Diego (Holiday Bowl) | ESPN | W 33–0 | 64,607 |
*Non-conference game; ^{†}Homecoming; Rankings from AP Poll released prior to the game; All times are in Central time

== Roster and coaching staff ==
2009 Nebraska Cornhuskers football team roster
Players
Coaches
Offense

| Pos. | # | Name | Class |
|---|---|---|---|
| OL | 70 | Nick Ash | Fr |
| OL | 66 | Cruz Barrett | Jr |
| TE | 91 | Robert Barry | Fr |
| WR | 2 | Antonio Bell | Fr |
| WR | 9 | Joe Broekemeier | Jr |
| WR | 1 | Chris Brooks | Sr |
| RB | 22 | Rex Burkhead | Fr |
| WR | 82 | Wes Cammack | Sr |
| OL | 58 | Mike Caputo | So |
| OL | 51 | Brandon Chapek | Fr |
| OL | 77 | Seung Hoon Choi | RFr |
| OL | 62 | Andy Christensen | Sr |
| WR | 42 | Tyson Clark | Fr |
| OL | 71 | Jesse Coffey | Fr |
| WR | 6 | Khiry Cooper | RFr |
| TE | 81 | Ben Cotton | RFr |
| WR | 87 | Taylor Dixon | RFr |
| WR | 35 | Nick Failla | Fr |
| WR | 11 | Curenski Gilleylen | So |
| QB | 17 | Cody Green | Fr |
| FB | 30 | Mike Hays | So |
| IB | 10 | Roy Helu Jr. | Jr |
| OL | 74 | Ricky Henry | Jr |
| WR | 8 | Will Henry | Jr |
| OL | 67 | Jacob Hickman (C) | Sr |
| TE | 80 | Ryan Hill | So |
| WR | 18 | Menelik Holt | Sr |
| WR | 85 | KC Hyland | RFr |
| IB | 28 | Austin Jones | So |
| OL | 73 | D.J. Jones | Jr |
| OL | 52 | Dwight Jones | Fr |
| OL | 78 | Marcel Jones | So |
| QB | 12 | Ron Kellogg III | Fr |
| TE | 89 | J.T. Kerr | Fr |
| WR | 4 | Ty Kildow | Fr |
| WR | 84 | Brandon Kinnie | So |
| QB | 5 | Zac Lee | Jr |
| FB | 48 | Tyler Legate | So |
| OL | 75 | Luke Lingenfelter | So |
| TE | 41 | Jake Long | Fr |
| WR | 26 | Tim Marlowe | RFr |
| TE | 88 | Jay Martin | So |
| QB | 3 | Taylor Martinez | Fr |
| TE | 86 | Mychael McClure | RFr |
| TE | 44 | Mike McNeill | Jr |
| WR | 32 | Marcus Mendoza | So |
| OL | 63 | Derek Meyer | Sr |
| OL | 69 | Brodrick Nickens | Fr |
| IB | 29 | Collins Okafor | RFr |
| WR | 21 | Steven Osborne | RFr |
| WR | 83 | Joseph Partington | So |
| WR | 24 | Niles Paul | Jr |
| OL | 76 | Brent Qvale | Fr |
| TE | 25 | Kyler Reed | RFr |
| RB | 27 | Dontrayevous Robinson | Fr |
| OL | 57 | Jeremiah Sirles | Fr |
| OL | 65 | Mike Smith | Jr |
| QB | 7 | Kody Spano | RFr |
| OL | 79 | Brandon Thompson | RFr |
| FB | 37 | Kevin Thomsen | So |
| OL | 59 | Brian Thorson | RFr |
| OL | 50 | Quentin Toailoa | RFr |
| RB | 34 | Jeremy Wallace | RFr |
| IB | 14 | Lester Ward | RFr |
| QB | 15 | Latravis Washington | Jr |
| WR | 16 | Adam Watson | Jr |
| TE | 47 | Brett Wells | Fr |
| OL | 68 | Keith Williams | Jr |
| TE | 49 | Dreu Young | Jr |
| RB | 31 | C.J. Zimmerer | Fr |

Defense

| Pos. | # | Name | Class |
|---|---|---|---|
| DE | 95 | Pierre Allen | Jr |
| CB | 21 | Prince Amukamara | Jr |
| DE | 70 | Kenny Anderson | RFr |
| DE | 9 | Jason Ankrah | Fr |
| S | 4 | Larry Asante | Sr |
| CB | 39 | Justin Blatchford | RFr |
| CB | 14 | Anthony Blue | So |
| LB | 22 | Joseph Camarata | RFr |
| S | 8 | Austin Cassidy | So |
| LB | 51 | Will Compton | RFr |
| DT | 94 | Jared Crick | So |
| CB | 31 | Jase Dean | RFr |
| CB | 15 | Alfonzo Dennard | So |
| LB | 52 | Phillip Dillard | Sr |
| S | 32 | Jim Ebke | So |
| DE | 92 | Tyrone Fahie | Jr |
| LB | 42 | Sean Fisher | RFr |
| DE | 91 | Dan Glassman | Jr |
| CB | 7 | DeJon Gomes | Jr |
| DB | 11 | Andrew Green | Fr |
| LB | 41 | Thomas Grove | Jr |
| S | 28 | Eric Hagg | Jr |
| DE | 80 | David Harvey | Sr |
| LB | 35 | Matt Holt | So |
| LB | 57 | Mitch Hron | Fr |
| DL | 58 | Justin Jackson | RFr |
| S | 29 | Seth Jameson | Fr |
| DL | 78 | Colin Kanne | Fr |
| DT | 85 | Faron Klingelhoefer | So |
| LB | 54 | Colton Koehler | Sr |
| LB | 44 | Micah Kreikemeier | RFr |
| LB | 40 | Blake Lawrence | Jr |
| LB | 37 | Tyrone Lewis | Fr |
| DE | 81 | Spencer Long | Fr |
| LB | 49 | Matt Manninger | RFr |
| DT | 63 | Ben Martin | Jr |
| LB | 46 | Eric Martin | Fr |
| LB | 36 | Mathew May | So |
| DE | 65 | Colin McDermott | RFr |
| DE | 66 | Conor McDermott | RFr |
| DE | 34 | Cameron Meredith | RFr |
| DB | 2 | Lazarri Middleton | Fr |
| DT | 68 | Josh Molek | RFr |
| DT | 90 | Terrence Moore | So |
| S | 43 | Brent Moravec | RFr |
| S | 33 | Matt O'Hanlon | Sr |
| S | 12 | Courtney Osborne | RFr |
| LB | 56 | Devin Paulsen | Fr |
| DL | 62 | Cole Pensick | Fr |
| DL | 53 | Thaddeus Randle | Fr |
| DB | 16 | Wil Richards | Fr |
| S | 13 | P.J. Smith | RFr |
| LB | 59 | Colby Starkebaum | Fr |
| DT | 55 | Baker Steinkuhler | RFr |
| LB | 38 | Graham Stoddard | RFr |
| DT | 93 | Ndamukong Suh (C) | Sr |
| S | 3 | Rickey Thenarse | Sr |
| CB | 23 | Lance Thorell | So |
| DE | 99 | Barry Turner | Sr |
| DB | 10 | Dijon Washington | Fr |
| CB | 5 | Anthony West | Jr |
| LB | 45 | Alonzo Whaley | RFr |
| LB | 48 | Chris Williams | Fr |
| DE | 98 | Josh Williams | RFr |

Special teams

| Pos. | # | Name | Class |
|---|---|---|---|
| P/PK | 95 | Tyler Daake | Fr |
| P/PK | 27 | Jon Damkroger | So |
| PK/P | 90 | Alex Henery (C) | Jr |
| LS | 93 | Adam Kuhl | Fr |
| PK | 1 | Adi Kunalic | Jr |
| P/PK | 96 | Brett Maher | RFr |
| LS | 92 | P.J. Mangieri | Fr |
| LS | 67 | Sam Meginnis | RFr |

Head coach

- Bo Pelini
  2nd season
  3rd year at Nebraska
  Alma mater: Ohio State

Coordinators/assistant coaches

- Shawn Watson
  3rd season as OC/QB coach
  4th year at Nebraska
  Alma mater: Southern Illinois
- Carl Pelini
  2nd season as DC/DL coach
  2nd year at Nebraska
  Alma mater: Youngstown State
- Tim Beck
  2nd season as RB coach
  2nd year at Nebraska
  Alma mater: Central Florida
- Ron Brown
  2nd season as TE coach
  19th year at Nebraska
  Alma mater: Brown
- Barney Cotton
  2nd season as AHC/OL coach
  3rd year at Nebraska
  Alma mater: Nebraska
- Mike Ekeler
  2nd season as LB coach
  2nd year at Nebraska
  Alma mater: Kansas State
- Ted Gilmore
  2nd season as AHC/Rec coach
  5th year at Nebraska
  Alma mater: Wyoming
- John Papuchis
  2nd season as DE/ST coach
  2nd year at Nebraska
  Alma mater: Virginia Tech
- Marvin Sanders
  2nd season as Sec coach
  3rd year at Nebraska
  Alma mater: Nebraska
- James Dobson
  2nd season as S&C coach
  2nd year at Nebraska
  Alma mater: Wisconsin
- Curt Baldus
  2nd season as GA coach
  3rd year at Nebraska
  Alma mater: St. Cloud State
- Ross Watson
  2nd season as GA coach
  2nd year at Nebraska
  Alma mater: Mount Union

Legend

- (C) Team captain
- (S) Suspended
- (I) Ineligible
- Injured
- Redshirt

Roster
Last update: 2011-01-10

== Depth chart ==
Defensive starters

FS
Matt O'Hanlon
Eric Hagg

SS
Larry Asante
P.J. Smith

NICKEL
Eric Hagg
Austin Cassidy

LB
Phillip Dillard
Will Compton
Sean Fisher

DIME
DeJon Gomes
Lance Thorell

CB
Alfonzo Dennard
Anthony West

| DE | DT | DT | DE |
|---|---|---|---|
| Barry Turner | Ndamukong Suh | Jared Crick | Pierre Allen |
| Cameron Meredith | Terrence Moore | Baker Steinkuhler | Josh Williams |

CB
Prince Amukamara
Lance Thorell

Offensive starters

FB
Tyler Legate
Mike Hays

WR
Niles Paul
Chris Brooks
Khiry Cooper

| LT | LG | C | RG | RT |
|---|---|---|---|---|
| Mike Smith | Keith Williams | Jacob Hickman | Ricky Henry | Marcel Jones |
| Marcel Jones | Derek Meyer | Mike Caputo | Andy Christensen | D.J. Jones |

TE
Mike McNeil
Dreu Young
Kyler Reed
Ben Cotton

WR
Menelik Holt
Curenski Gilleylen
Brandon Kinnie

QB
Zac Lee
Cody Green

RB
Roy Helu
Rex Burkhead
Dontrayevois Robinson

== Game summaries ==
=== Florida Atlantic ===
Florida Atlantic at #24 Nebraska

| Team | 1 | 2 | 3 | 4 | Total |
|---|---|---|---|---|---|
| Florida Atlantic | 0 | 3 | 0 | 0 | 3 |
| • #24 Nebraska | 7 | 14 | 21 | 7 | 49 |

- Date: September 5
- Location: Memorial Stadium, Lincoln, Nebraska
- Game start: 6:00 p.m. CST
- Elapsed time: 3:02
- Game attendance: 85,719
- Game weather: Mostly Sunny, 77F, Wind SSE@6, 77% Humidity
- Referee: Adrian Hill
- TV announcers (FSN PPV): Ron Thulin (Play-by-play), Kelly Stouffer (Color), & Kent Pavelka (Sideline)

This was the first time Nebraska had met the Florida Atlantic Owls, who, in 2008, finished 6–6 (4–3) for a 3rd place tie with Arkansas State in the Sun Belt Conference and finished with a 24–21 victory in the 2008 Motor City Bowl against Central Michigan. Nebraska entered the contest with a 4-game winning streak after defeating Clemson in the Gator Bowl. Nebraska defeated the Howard Schnellenberger-led Owls, 49–3. Nebraska's Roy Helu Jr. rushed for 152 yards and three touchdowns, while Zac Lee, in his first start as quarterback at Nebraska, threw for 213 yards and two touchdowns, along with one interception. The FAU offense gained 122 yards rushing and 230 yards passing. However, they were unable to score a touchdown, with their only points coming from a 21-yard field goal by Ross Gornall in the second quarter. A large part of this was because of 5 turnovers by the Owls. This win extended the Cornhuskers season-opener win streak to 24 games, the nation's longest.

=== Arkansas State ===
Arkansas State at #22 Nebraska

| Team | 1 | 2 | 3 | 4 | Total |
|---|---|---|---|---|---|
| Arkansas State | 0 | 6 | 0 | 3 | 9 |
| • #22 Nebraska | 14 | 10 | 7 | 7 | 38 |

- Date: September 12
- Location: Memorial Stadium, Lincoln, Nebraska
- Game start: 1:00 p.m. CST
- Elapsed time: 2:47
- Game attendance: 85,035
- Game weather: Cloudy, 73F, Wind NE@7, 70% Humidity
- Referee: Randy Christal
- TV announcers (FSN PPV): Ron Thulin (Play-by-play), Kelly Stouffer (Color), & Kent Pavelka (Sideline)

Cornhusker QB Zac Lee passed for over 340 yards and four touchdowns as the Cornhuskers defeated Arkansas State in Lincoln 38–9. Nebraska's defense held the Red Wolves out of the end zone except for a single touchdown and field goal, while the Cornhusker offense was able to gain yardage. This was the first time Nebraska had met the Arkansas State Red Wolves, who finished the 2008 season 6–6 (4–3) for a 3rd place tie with Florida Atlantic in the Sun Belt Conference, although they were not invited to a postseason bowl game.

=== Virginia Tech ===
#19 Nebraska Cornhuskers (2–0) at #13 Virginia Tech Hokies (1–1)

| Quarter | 1 | 2 | 3 | 4 | Total |
|---|---|---|---|---|---|
| Nebraska | 3 | 9 | 0 | 3 | 15 |
| Virginia Tech | 7 | 3 | 0 | 6 | 16 |

at Lane Stadium, Blacksburg, Virginia

- Date: September 19, 2009
- Game time: 3:30 p.m. EST
- Game weather: Cloudy, 74 °F (23 °C)
- Game attendance: 66,233
- Referee: Karl Richins
- TV announcers (ABC/ESPN2): Sean McDonough (Play-by-play), Matt Millen (Color), and Holly Rowe (Sideline)
- Box Score

Game information

First quarter

- VT – Ryan Williams 1-yard run (Matt Waldron kick), 11:15. Virginia Tech 7–0. Drive: 7 plays, 24 yards, 3:45.
- NU – Alex Henery 40-yard field goal, 0:56. Virginia Tech 7–3. Drive: 4 plays, −1 yard, 1:29.

Second quarter

- NU – Alex Henery 27-yard field goal, 12:49. Virginia Tech 7–6. Drive: 6 plays, 48 yards, 1:49.
- NU – Alex Henery 19-yard field goal, 5:23. Nebraska 9–7. Drive: 10 plays, 77 yards, 4:32.
- VT – Matt Waldron 39-yard field goal, 2:30. Virginia Tech 10–9. Drive: 7 plays, 58 yards, 2:53.
- NU – Alex Henery 38-yard field goal, 0:18. Nebraska 12–10. Drive: 5 plays, 50 yards, 2:06.

Fourth quarter

- NU – Alex Henery 38-yard field goal, 4:33. Nebraska 15–10. Drive: 10 plays, 54 yards, 5:01.
- VT – Dyrell Roberts 11-yard pass from Tyrod Taylor (pass failed), 0:21. Virginia Tech 16–15. Drive: 5 plays, 88 yards, 1:23.

Top passers

- NU – Zac Lee – 11/30, 136 yards, 2 INT
- VT – Tyrod Taylor – 12/27, 192 yards, TD

Top rushers

- NU – Roy Helu Jr. – 28 rushes, 169 yards
- VT – Ryan Williams – 21 rushes, 107 yards, TD

Top receivers

- NU – Curenski Gilleylen – 1 reception, 35 yards
- VT – Danny Coale – 2 receptions, 89 yards

The Huskers fell to 2–1 against the Hokies in the final seconds, having split the series with a 41–21 Nebraska victory in the 1996 Orange Bowl and a 30–35 Nebraska home field loss in non-conference play in 2008. Nebraska was poised to win its first touchdown-free game since 1937 on PK Alex Henery's career-high five field goals, but Virginia Tech escaped the home loss when Hokie QB Tyrod Taylor found receiver Dyrell Roberts on 3rd and goal from the 11 with just 21 seconds remaining to play. Statistically Nebraska outperformed the Hokies on offense, as Virginia Tech was held to just 11 first downs, only 4 first downs after the first quarter, pinned Hokie QB Taylor to −22 yards on the ground, and outgained Virginia Tech 343–278. 112 of the 278 Hokie yards were acquired on just three key plays.

=== Louisiana Lafayette ===
Louisiana–Lafayette at #25 Nebraska

| Team | 1 | 2 | 3 | 4 | Total |
|---|---|---|---|---|---|
| Louisiana–Lafayette | 0 | 0 | 0 | 0 | 0 |
| • #25 Nebraska | 13 | 21 | 7 | 14 | 55 |

- Date: September 26
- Location: Memorial Stadium, Lincoln, Nebraska
- Game start: 6:08 p.m. CST
- Elapsed time: 2:51
- Game attendance: 86,304
- Game weather: Sunny, 74F, Wind SW@1, 38% Humidity
- Referee: Matt Loeffler
- TV announcers (FSN PPV): Brent Stover (Play-by-play), Matt Davison (Color), & Kent Pavelka (Sideline)

This was the first time Nebraska had met the Louisiana–Lafayette Ragin' Cajuns, who finished 6–6 (5–2) for a 2nd-place finish in the Sun Belt Conference in 2008. This game was also Nebraska's 300th consecutive sellout of Memorial Stadium (an ongoing NCAA record), and the Cornhuskers wore 'throwback'-style uniforms based on the team's 1962 appearance from when the NCAA-record streak began, to commemorate the milestone.

Nebraska smothered Louisiana Lafayette in front of an all-time Memorial Stadium record crowd, piling up 55 points while posting their first shutout since a 56–0 pasting of Troy in 2006. Nearly all of Nebraska's active roster found playing time, as the game was decided early.

=== Missouri ===
#21 Nebraska at #24 Missouri

| Team | 1 | 2 | 3 | 4 | Total |
|---|---|---|---|---|---|
| • #21 Nebraska | 0 | 0 | 0 | 27 | 27 |
| #24 Missouri | 0 | 9 | 3 | 0 | 12 |

- Date: October 8
- Location: Faurot Field, Columbia, Missouri
- Game start: 8:01 p.m. CST
- Elapsed time: 3:28
- Game attendance: 65,826
- Game weather: Raining, 55F, Wind N@5mph
- Referee: Scott Novak
- TV announcers (ESPN): Chris Fowler (Play-by-play), Craig James (Color), Jesse Palmer (Color), & Erin Andrews (Sideline)

In a game that nearly was canceled twice—once by torrential rains, possible lightning hazards, and potential flooding, and again when a power outage darkened the stadium less than an hour before kickoff—Nebraska tied an all-time 4th-quarter comeback record, previously set in 1966, when the Cornhusker offense overcame the weather and penalties to roll off 27 unanswered points.

Missouri QB Blaine Gabbert was hobbled early in the game with an apparent ankle injury, but Tiger Head Coach Gary Pinkel opted to keep him in the game. Both teams struggled in heavy rain conditions to produce offensive output early on. The teams combined for 11 punts and two fumbles in the first half, with Missouri's safety early in the second quarter and a last-second touchdown just before halftime for the only points on the board.

With electrical problems persisting and scoreboards remaining dark throughout the night, the Cornhuskers attempted to regroup during the half in a locker room without lights.

The third quarter continued the scoring struggle, with Missouri still holding Nebraska off the scoreboard while only managing a field goal. In the fourth quarter, however, Nebraska managed to score with three touchdowns in 3:22, thanks in part to two turnovers forced by the Cornhusker defense. Protecting an 8-point lead, and with the stands quickly emptying of rain-soaked Tiger fans, Nebraska tried to run the ball for short gains in order to let the clock tick down. They did, however, score another touchdown with 56 seconds remaining to put the game out of reach.

The road win against #24 Missouri was Nebraska's first win against a ranked opponent since a 28–27 win against Texas A&M in 2006. This was Nebraska's first win in Columbia since 2001. Nebraska improved their series lead against Missouri, dating back to 1892, to 64–36–3. Although it was not known at the time the game was played, this would be the last conference meeting at Faurot Field in Columbia, Missouri between these teams. Nebraska would leave the Big XII conference for the Big 10 in 2011.

=== Texas Tech ===
Texas Tech at #15 Nebraska

| Team | 1 | 2 | 3 | 4 | Total |
|---|---|---|---|---|---|
| • Texas Tech | 14 | 10 | 0 | 7 | 31 |
| #15 Nebraska | 0 | 3 | 0 | 7 | 10 |

- Date: October 17
- Location: Memorial Stadium, Lincoln, Nebraska
- Game start: 2:34 p.m. CST
- Elapsed time: 3:19
- Game attendance: 86,107
- Game weather: Partly sunny, 46F, Wind S@1mph
- Referee: Cooper Castleberry
- TV announcers (ABC/ESPN): Mike Patrick (Play-by-play), Craig James (Color), & Heather Cox (Sideline)

Nebraska's hopes for redemption following last year's heartbreaking loss in Lubbock against the then-#7 Texas Tech Red Raiders fell short as the Cornhuskers never found a groove in their offensive output, even after changing quarterbacks for much of the second half. The Cornhusker defensive effort was outstanding, holding the unranked Red Raiders to just 259 yards, less than half of their season average. Although the offensive unit outgained Texas Tech with 285 total yards of its own, penalties and miscues took a heavy toll that could not be overcome.

Nebraska's abrupt move to the Big Ten Conference would take effect for the 2011 season, leaving this series under the control of the Cornhuskers at 7–4.

=== Iowa State ===
Iowa State at Nebraska

| Team | 1 | 2 | 3 | 4 | Total |
|---|---|---|---|---|---|
| • Iowa State | 3 | 6 | 0 | 0 | 9 |
| Nebraska | 7 | 0 | 0 | 0 | 7 |

- Date: October 24
- Location: Memorial Stadium, Lincoln, Nebraska
- Game start: 11:41 a.m. CST
- Elapsed time: 3:09
- Game attendance: 85,938
- Game weather: Overcast, 44F, Wind SSE@3mph
- Referee: Karl Richins
- TV announcers (FSN): Joel Meyers (Play-by-play), Dave Lapham (Color), & Jim Knox (Sideline)

Although the Iowa State Cyclones have historically fared poorly in the previous 103 meetings with Nebraska, the Cyclones entered Memorial Stadium without their leading quarterback and rushing threat and subsequently played an error-free game. The solid effort was enough to put up 9 points in the first half to lead Nebraska by 2, which concluded the game's scoring. The 9 points turned out to be sufficient to win against the poor Cornhusker offensive effort, which turned over the ball a school-record eight times (including four inside of Iowa State's five-yard line). The turnovers negated Nebraska's 362–239 edge in yards gained.

The Cyclones moved up to 5–3 (2–2) after a 2–10 (0–8) record the previous season and enjoyed their first win in Memorial Stadium since 1977. First-year Iowa State Head Coach Paul Rhoads said about the game, "When you don't win in a stadium on the road since 1977, it's big." Overall, Nebraska leads the series 85–17–2.

=== Baylor ===
Nebraska at Baylor

| Team | 1 | 2 | 3 | 4 | Total |
|---|---|---|---|---|---|
| • Nebraska | 10 | 10 | 0 | 0 | 20 |
| Baylor | 0 | 0 | 10 | 0 | 10 |

- Date: October 31
- Location: Floyd Casey Stadium, Waco, Texas
- Game start: 11:30 a.m. CST
- Elapsed time: 3:20
- Game attendance: 31,702
- Game weather: Sunny, 57F, Wind WNW@8mph
- Referee: Rick Loumiet
- TV announcers (Versus): Ron Thulin (Play-by-play), Kelly Stouffer (Color), & Lewis Johnson (Sideline)

As part of the effort to provide a spark to its nonproductive offense, true freshman quarterback Cody Green made his first start and notched his first win against the Bears in Waco. Although highly touted Nebraska DT Ndamukong Suh had been making the most noise over the course of the season, to the point of generating early Heisman talk, it was DT Jared Crick who dominated Baylor, racking up seven additional tackles for loss and a school record five sacks, for a total of 13 tackles (10 solo), as well as a fumble recovery.

Baylor's own defense was also stubborn, only allowing the Cornhuskers 20 points in the first half before shutting them out in the second. Baylor managed a single field goal and a defensive touchdown off of an interception a short time later in the third quarter to end the scoring. The final score was 20–10 and gave Nebraska the road victory.

Just as with the Texas Tech game, it was not known at the time that this would be the last conference meeting between these teams, and the regular series drew to a close with Nebraska in command 11–1.

=== Oklahoma ===
#20 Oklahoma at Nebraska

| Team | 1 | 2 | 3 | 4 | Total |
|---|---|---|---|---|---|
| #20 Oklahoma | 0 | 3 | 0 | 0 | 3 |
| • Nebraska | 0 | 7 | 3 | 0 | 10 |

- Date: November 7
- Location: Memorial Stadium, Lincoln, Nebraska
- Game start: 7:13 p.m. CST
- Elapsed time: 3:23
- Game attendance: 86,115
- Game weather: Clear, 52F, Wind NE@8mph, 44% Humidity
- Referee: Greg Burks
- TV announcers (ABC): Ron Franklin (Play-by-play) & Ed Cunningham (Color)

Scoring summary
| 2 | 13:36 | NEB | Ryan Hill 1-yard pass from Zac Lee (Alex Henery kick) | NEB 7–0 |
| 2 | 0:24 | OU | Tress Way 24-yard field goal | NEB 7–3 |
| 4 | 5:38 | NEB | Alex Henery 28-yard field goal | NEB 10–3 |

The history of Nebraska's contests with the Oklahoma Sooners continued in this 85th meeting between these programs, with Oklahoma holding a 44–37–3 series lead. Oklahoma had defeated Nebraska in 2008 with a strong offensive output in Norman, which left Nebraska behind 0–35 in the first quarter.

In 2009, the defenses took control of the game. Oklahoma made their way down the field but were stopped in Nebraska territory. Tres Way tried for his first career field goal but instead sent it flying to the left. Later in the first quarter Oklahoma made it way back down and tried for another field goal but this time Ndamukong Suh made sure the game stayed tied by getting a hand on the kick. Later on, Oklahoma QB Landry Jones was intercepted by Prince Amukamara of Nebraska, who returned it to the one-yard line. Nebraska's offense struggled most of the game, but they got the 1 yard they needed as Zac Lee connected to Ryan Hill for the game's only touchdown. Later Oklahoma and Nebraska exchanged field goals, and then Matt O'Hanlon got three interceptions in the fourth quarter to seal an important victory for the Nebraska Cornhuskers and keep Oklahoma from recording even a single touchdown.

This game also turned out to be the unplanned final regular season conference meeting between these programs in their storied historical rivalry, and the Sooners and Cornhuskers parted ways with Oklahoma owning the series edge 44–38–3.

=== Kansas ===
Nebraska at Kansas

| Team | 1 | 2 | 3 | 4 | Total |
|---|---|---|---|---|---|
| • Nebraska | 7 | 3 | 3 | 18 | 31 |
| Kansas | 0 | 10 | 0 | 7 | 17 |

- Date: November 14
- Location: Memorial Stadium, Lawrence, Kansas
- Game start: 2:30 p.m. CST
- Elapsed time: 3:07
- Game attendance: 51,525
- Game weather: Cloudy, 53F, Wind N@8mph
- Referee: Cooper Castleberry
- TV announcers (ABC): Ron Franklin (Play-by-play) & Ed Cunningham (Color)

The Nebraska offense tried to improve over their performance the previous week against Oklahoma. Chastised for playing close conservatively during the 10–3 win over Oklahoma, the Cornhuskers hit Kansas with a barrage of big plays to win in Lawrence for the first time since 2003. To start the game Niles Paul caught a Zac Lee pass for a 35-yard gain. Roy Helu Jr. ran for 156 yards and three touchdowns, and Nebraska used big plays on offense to beat Kansas 31–17 Saturday and take a share of the Big 12 North lead.

=== Kansas State ===
Kansas State at Nebraska

| Team | 1 | 2 | 3 | 4 | Total |
|---|---|---|---|---|---|
| Kansas State | 3 | 0 | 0 | 0 | 3 |
| • Nebraska | 3 | 7 | 7 | 0 | 17 |

- Date: November 21
- Location: Memorial Stadium, Lincoln, Nebraska
- Game start: 6:47 p.m. CST
- Elapsed time: 3:01
- Game attendance: 85,998
- Game weather: Cloudy, 52F, Wind SE@13mph
- Referee: Greg Burks
- TV announcers (ESPN): Brad Nessler (Play-by-play), Todd Blackledge (Color), & Erin Andrews (Sideline)

Roy Helu Jr. ran 26 times for 95 yards and a touchdown, and Nebraska defeated Kansas State 17–3 to win the Big 12 North. The win earned the Huskers a birth in the Big 12 conference championship game on December 5 in Arlington, Texas against the Texas Longhorns. The third-ranked Longhorns clinched the South Division with a 51–20 win over Kansas.

Kansas State (6–6, 4–4) ended its season with losses in three of its last four games. Because two of the Wildcats' wins were against lower-division teams, they needed to beat Nebraska to become eligible for a bowl game.

The Huskers' Zac Lee completed 13 of 19 passes for 166 yards and a touchdown. Helu gave Nebraska a two-touchdown lead early in the third quarter with his 14-yard run. Daniel Thomas ran 19 times for 99 yards for Kansas State, and Grant Gregory was 11 of 31 for 126 yards. The Wildcats failed to score a touchdown for the second straight game despite their offense spending most of the second half on Nebraska's side of the field.

Three scoring opportunities were lost when Keithen Valentine fumbled at the Nebraska 1 and Josh Cherry missed field goals of 51 and 32 yards. The Wildcats, trailing by two touchdowns, drove to the Nebraska 25 in the last 4 minutes, but Ndamukong Suh and Barry Turner teamed up to sack Gregory. The Wildcats turned the ball over on downs when Gregory led Brandon Banks too much on a ball thrown toward the end zone.

The Huskers took over with 3:41 left and were able to run out the clock for their fourth straight win after Lee sneaked for a first down on fourth-and-1 from his own 36. Kansas State's only points came at the end of the game's opening series, when Cherry kicked a 44-yard field goal.

=== Colorado ===
Nebraska at Colorado

| Team | 1 | 2 | 3 | 4 | Total |
|---|---|---|---|---|---|
| • Nebraska | 7 | 14 | 0 | 7 | 28 |
| Colorado | 0 | 7 | 7 | 6 | 20 |

- Date: November 27
- Location: Folsom Field, Boulder, Colorado
- Game start: 2:36 p.m. CST
- Elapsed time: 3:13
- Game attendance: 52,817
- Game weather: Mostly Sunny, 69F, Wind SE@7mph
- Referee: Matt Loeffler
- TV announcers (ABC): Ron Franklin (Play-by-play) & Ed Cunningham (Color)

Nebraska ended Colorado's season by defeating the Buffaloes at Folsom Field. Colorado elected to receive to start, and the Cornhusker defense prevented them from getting further than their own 21-yard line on all four of their first-quarter possessions, setting the tone for the game. Nebraska's offense struggled at times during the game, and the Buffaloes gained some traction in the second half. Colorado's two trips into the red zone during the fourth quarter produced no points through the efforts of the blackshirts to turn them away. Nebraska moved the ball 80 yards in 13 plays to seal the game with seven more points, going up 28–14. The teams traded possessions again, before Colorado managed to punch in a final touchdown on the last play of the game.

Nebraska, enjoying their fifth straight win, capped their regular conference schedule at 6–2, winning all league road games for the year. Colorado's season ended with no bowl game and a 3–9 record in coach Dan Hawkins' fourth year. Nebraska extended their series lead to 48–18–2.

=== Texas ===
#3 Texas vs. #21 Nebraska

| Team | 1 | 2 | 3 | 4 | Total |
|---|---|---|---|---|---|
| • #3 Texas | 0 | 7 | 3 | 3 | 13 |
| #21 Nebraska | 6 | 0 | 0 | 6 | 12 |

- Date: December 5
- Location: Cowboys Stadium, Arlington, Texas
- Game start: 7:00 p.m. CST
- Elapsed time: 3:17
- Game attendance: 76,211
- Game weather: Indoors
- Referee: Tom Walker
- TV announcers (ABC): Brent Musburger (Play-by-play), Kirk Herbstreit (Color), & Lisa Salters (Sideline)

This was Nebraska first trip to the Big 12 title game since 2006 and fifth time in the league's 14 years. Nebraska met undefeated #3 Texas for the 2009 Big 12 Championship Game as heavy underdogs, as 63 of 64 media predictions recorded by one source predicted a Texas victory. Nebraska hoped to upset the Longhorns and earn a BCS bowl game berth. The Longhorns sought to stay unbeaten and earn an invitation to the 2010 BCS National Championship Game.

The game was defined by dominant defenses on both sides. The Nebraska offense, still struggling to find a productive groove, was rendered ineffective by Texas, gaining only 106 yards on the day and scoring all 12 points on field goals. However, the highly productive Longhorn offense led by Heisman-candidate Colt McCoy found itself struggling to make progress against the blackshirts. McCoy was sacked nine times and intercepted three times, while Texas was held to just 202 yards of offense for the game. The 13 Longhorn points were the fewest they had scored in any game since a 7–12 loss to Texas A&M in 2006.

Late in the fourth quarter, with Texas holding a slight 10–9 lead, Nebraska came up with the most productive series of the night, going 43 yards in 8 plays to set up the go-ahead field goal putting Nebraska up 12–10 with just 1:44 to play. Texas faced their first loss of the season and the loss of an invite to the national championship. A poor kickoff following the field goal provided Texas with good starting field position, and a 15-yard penalty on Nebraska shortly thereafter put Texas in the outer reaches of field goal range. Texas tried to inch closer from there but McCoy was sacked for a 2-yard loss. Then Texas lost another yard on a rush attempt, and had an incomplete pass on 3rd down that started with just 8 seconds remaining in the game. The timekeeper allowed the game clock to expire, and the Nebraska Cornhuskers rushed the field to celebrate their unlikely 2009 league championship.

The celebration was short-lived, however. Instant replay found that the incomplete ball hit a railing with 1 second remaining. Checking the exact timing on every play of a game is not normally performed, and it is not uncommon for a second or two to tick off after plays are completed. A review was ordered, and one second was placed back on the game clock, and the field was cleared of the celebrating Cornhuskers and staff. Texas' subsequent 4th down field goal gave the Longhorns a league title by the narrowest margin in Big 12 championship history.

Nebraska slipped to 4–9 against Texas all time, and to 2–3 in the league championship game. Despite the loss, Nebraska's performance resulted in the team moving up one spot in both of the major college football rankings.

Texas game starters

| Position | Player |
|---|---|
| Quarterback | Zac Lee |
| Running back | Roy Helu |
| Fullback | Tyler Legate |
| Wide receiver | Menelik Holt |
| Wide receiver | Niles Paul |
| Tight end | Mike McNeill |
| Left tackle | D.J Jones |
| Left guard | Ricky Henry |
| Center | Jacob Hickman |
| Right guard | Kieth Williams |
| Right tackle | Mike Smith |

| Position | Player |
|---|---|
| Defensive end | Pierre Allen |
| Defensive tackle | Jared Crick |
| Defensive tackle | Ndamukong Suh |
| Defensive end | Barry Turner |
| Linebacker | Phillip Dillard |
| Cornerback | Prince Amukamara |
| Dimeback | DeJon Gomes |
| Strong safety | Larry Asante |
| Free safety | Matt O'Hanlon |
| Nickelback | Eric Hagg |
| Cornerback | Alfonzo Dennard |

=== Arizona ===
#22 Arizona vs. #20 Nebraska

| Team | 1 | 2 | 3 | 4 | Total |
|---|---|---|---|---|---|
| #22 Arizona | 0 | 0 | 0 | 0 | 0 |
| • #20 Nebraska | 10 | 13 | 10 | 0 | 33 |

- Date: December 30
- Location: Qualcomm Stadium, San Diego, California
- Game start: 7:08 p.m. CST
- Elapsed time: 3:16
- Game attendance: 64,607
- Game weather: Cool and overcast, 52F, Wind W@5mph
- Referee: Tom Zimorski
- TV announcers (ESPN/ESPN Radio): Chris Fowler (Play-by-play), Craig James (Color), Jesse Palmer (Color), & Erin Andrews (Sideline)/Bill Rosinski (Play-by-play), Dennis Franchione (Color), & Joe Schad (Sideline)

Arizona hoped to capitalize on the suspect Nebraska offense, with their best hope being to put at least a couple of scores in against the blackshirts while keeping the Cornhuskers off the board as much as possible. The Nebraska coaching staff, however, installed some entirely different offensive looks that Arizona had not prepared for. The new offensive schemes leveraged the strengths of available personnel and minimized turnover risks. The tone of the game was set early on when Nebraska intercepted Arizona and subsequently punched in the first touchdown of the game only 75 seconds into the contest. From there on out, the Wildcats were on their heels, often unable to contain the steady Nebraska gains, and unable to score or make any progress against the Nebraska defense.

The Wildcats gained only 109 total yards on the day and six first downs. Nebraska committed seven penalties for 55 yards, but managed to hold Arizona off of the scoreboard entirely, and posted the first Holiday Bowl game shutout. The bowl was also Nebraska's first ever bowl game shutout win. The only other major statistical battles won by Arizona were in the punting game in kickoff return yards. The Wildcats netted approximately six more yards per punt in their nine attempts than Nebraska managed in its four attempts. In kickoff return yards, Arizona had eight opportunities compared to the lone Nebraska kickoff return to open the second half.

Nebraska evened up the all-time series against the Wildcats, to 1–1–1. Nebraska had a 20–23 Holiday Bowl loss to Arizona in 1998 and a 14–14 tie against the Wildcats in 1961.

== Rankings ==
Ranking movements Legend: ██ Increase in ranking ██ Decrease in ranking — = Not ranked RV = Received votes
| | Week | | | | | | | | | | | | | | | |
| Poll | Pre | 1 | 2 | 3 | 4 | 5 | 6 | 7 | 8 | 9 | 10 | 11 | 12 | 13 | 14 | Final |
|---|---|---|---|---|---|---|---|---|---|---|---|---|---|---|---|---|
| AP | 24 | 22 | 19 | 25 | 23 | 21 | 15 | RV | — | — | RV | RV | RV | 21 | 20 | 14 |
| Coaches | 22 | 18 | 18 | 24 | 24 | 22 | 17 | RV | — | — | RV | 25 | 23 | 20 | 19 | 14 |
| Harris | Not released | | | | 24 | 21 | 19 | RV | — | RV | RV | 25 | 24 | 22 | 20 | Not released |
| BCS | Not released | | | | | | | — | — | — | — | — | — | 22 | 22 | Not released |

== After the season ==
After the bowl game it was revealed that QB Zac Lee had been playing with an injured throwing arm since the Arkansas State game on September 12, the second game of the season, and that off-season surgery was scheduled to help him ready for the 2010 season. Despite periods of fan outcries about Nebraska's offensive struggles, news of his injury had deliberately been withheld during the season to prevent opposing teams from using the specific knowledge to their advantage.

With the Holiday Bowl victory, Pelini secured the program's first 10-win season since 2003, which coincidentally was the season when former head coach Frank Solich was controversially fired before the bowl game and Pelini himself as interim coach led the Cornhuskers to their 10th win of 2003 in the Alamo Bowl against Michigan State. Nebraska finished 2009 with the nation's No. 1 scoring defense for only the second time in school history (1984). The Nebraska defense also led the country in pass efficiency defense and red zone efficiency defense, and it finished in the top ten in the four major defensive categories (scoring, total, pass efficiency, rushing) for the first time since 1999. Nebraska's overall program record at the end of the 2009 season stood at 827–341–40 (.701) all-time.

=== Awards ===
| Award | Name(s) |
|---|---|
| Bronko Nagurski Trophy | Ndamukong Suh |
| Lombardi Award | Ndamukong Suh |
| Outland Trophy | Ndamukong Suh |
| Bednarik Award | Ndamukong Suh |
| AP Player of the Year | Ndamukong Suh |
| All-America 1st team | Ndamukong Suh |
| All-America honorable mention | Prince Amukamara, Larry Asante, Jared Crick, Phillip Dillard |
| Freshman All-America honorable mention | Baker Steinkuhler |
| Big 12 Defensive Player of the Year | Ndamukong Suh |
| Big 12 Defensive Lineman of the Year | Ndamukong Suh |
| All-Big 12 1st team | Prince Amukamara, Larry Asante, Jared Crick, Alex Henery, Mike McNeill, Ndamukong Suh |
| All-Big 12 2nd team | Phillip Dillard, Roy Helu Jr., Jacob Hickman, Niles Paul |
| All-Big 12 4th team | Matt O’Hanlon, Barry Turner |
| All-Big 12 honorable mention | DeJon Gomes, Eric Hagg, Ricky Henry, Barry Turner, Keith Williams |
| All-Big 12 Freshman 1st team | Will Compton, Ben Cotton, Sean Fisher |
| All-Big 12 Freshman honorable mention | Baker Steinkuhler |

== Draft picks, signees, or other future professional players ==
- Pierre Allen, 2011 free agent signee of the Seattle Seahawks
- Prince Amukamara, 2011 1st-round pick of the New York Giants
- Larry Asante, 2010 4th-round pick of the Cleveland Browns
- Rex Burkhead, 2013 6th-round pick of the Cincinnati Bengals
- Chris Brooks, 2010 free agent signee of the Tampa Bay Buccaneers
- Will Compton, 2013 free agent signee of the Washington Redskins
- Ben Cotton, 2013 free agent signee of the San Diego Chargers
- Jared Crick, 2012 4th-round pick of the Houston Texans
- Alfonzo Dennard, 2012 7th-round pick of the New England Patriots
- Phillip Dillard, 2010 4th-round pick of the New York Giants
- Dejon Gomes, 2011 5th-round pick of the Washington Redskins
- Eric Hagg, 2011 7th-round pick of the Cleveland Browns
- Roy Helu, 2011 4th-round pick of the Washington Redskins
- Alex Henery, 2011 4th-round pick of the Philadelphia Eagles
- Ricky Henry, 2011 UFL 1st-round pick of the Hartford Colonials
- D.J. Jones, 2011 UFL 6th-round pick of the Omaha Nighthawks
- Brandon Kinnie, 2012 free agent signee of the Kansas City Chiefs
- Adi Kunalic, 2011 free agent signee of the Carolina Panthers
- Zac Lee, 2011 free agent signee of the Seattle Seahawks
- Spencer Long, 2014 3rd-round pick of the Washington Redskins
- Brett Maher, 2013 free agent signee of the New York Jets
- Eric Martin, 2013 free agent signee of the New Orleans Saints
- Mike McNeill, 2011 free agent signee of the Indianapolis Colts
- Matt O'Hanlon, 2010 free agent signee of the Carolina Panthers
- Niles Paul, 2011 5th-round pick of the Washington Redskins
- Brent Qvale, 2014 free agent signee of the New York Jets
- Kyler Reed, 2013 free agent signee of the Jacksonville Jaguars
- Jeremiah Sirles, 2014 free agent signee of the San Diego Chargers
- Mike Smith, 2011 UFL 5th-round pick of the Omaha Nighthawks
- Ndamukong Suh, 2010 1st-round pick of the Detroit Lions
- Rickey Thenarse, 2011 free agent signee of the Seattle Seahawks
- Barry Turner, 2010 free agent signee of the Detroit Lions
- Anthony West, 2011 free agent signee of the San Francisco 49ers
- Keith Williams, 2011 6th-round pick of the Pittsburgh Steelers
