= 2009 Holiday Bowl =

2009 Pacific Life Holiday Bowl
Arizona Wildcats	Nebraska Cornhuskers
(8–4)	(9–4)
Pac-10	Big 12
0	33
Head coach: Mike Stoops	Head coach: Bo Pelini
AP / Coaches / BCS; 22 / 23 / 20	AP / Coaches / BCS; 20 / 19 / 22
	1	2	3	4	Total
Arizona	0	0	0	0	0
Nebraska	10	13	10	0	33
- Date: December 30, 2009
- Season: 2009
- Stadium: Qualcomm Stadium
- Location: San Diego, California
- MVP: WR Niles Paul (Nebraska); S Matt O'Hanlon (Nebraska)
- Referee: Tom Zimorski (ACC)
- Attendance: 64,607
- Payout: US$2,130,000 per team

United States TV coverage
- Network: ESPN
- Announcers: Chris Fowler; Craig James; Jesse Palmer; Erin Andrews
- Nielsen ratings: 3.7

The 2009 Holiday Bowl was the thirty-second edition of the college football bowl game and was played at Qualcomm Stadium in San Diego, California. The game started at 5:00 pm US PST on Wednesday, December 30, 2009. The game was telecast on ESPN. The Nebraska Cornhuskers defeated the Arizona Wildcats 33–0 for the first shutout in the history of the bowl. This was a rematch of the two teams, who faced each other in the 1998 Holiday Bowl, where Arizona defeated Nebraska 23–20.

== Background ==
The game featured the 2nd pick from the Pac-10 and the 3rd pick from the Big 12. The game had recently become a type of "upset" bowl. In previous years, teams rejected by the BCS had lost to heavy underdogs. In 2005, a 10–1 Oregon team (favored by 3 points while ranked 6th in the nation) playing without its star quarterback Kellen Clemens lost 17–14 to a surging Oklahoma squad that had won six out of its last seven. In 2004, one-loss California was defeated by Big 12 Texas Tech, 45–31. In 2003, Big 12 representative Texas was knocked off by Pac-10 representative Washington State, led by Matt Kegel.

The Wildcats drew the bid the day they wrapped up an 8-4 season with a 21–17 victory at USC, a win that gave Arizona a share of second place (along with Oregon State and Stanford) in the Pac-10 with a 6–3 conference record. Nebraska lost a 13–12 heartbreaker to Texas in the Big 12 Championship Game. The Cornhuskers won the conference's North Division with a 6–2 record. The 1998 meeting between the two teams was the only time that either school had appeared in the Holiday Bowl. The only other meeting between the two schools was a 14–14 tie in 1961.

On December 8, 2009, the Holiday Bowl committee announced a marketing campaign with fast food franchise Jack in the Box where Jack Box, the fictional chairman and CEO of the company and star of its marketing campaigns, would be the honorary chairman of the game and the grand marshal of the Port of San Diego Big Bay Balloon Parade.

== Game summary ==
Nebraska wore their home red jerseys, and Arizona wore their white away jerseys with their newly introduced white helmets.

Nebraska's 33–0 defeat of Arizona was the first and, to date, only shutout victory in the Holiday Bowl. Prior to the 2009 Holiday Bowl no team had scored fewer than 10 points in a game. The Wildcats were held to just 109 total yards of offense and just 6 first downs. The Cornhuskers were led on offense by wide receiver Niles Paul who hauled in 4 catches for 123 yards, including a touchdown, which accounted for 74 of his receiving yards. Quarterback Zac Lee threw for 173 yards and the TD to Paul. Rex Burkhead of Nebraska led all rushers with 89 yards and a touchdown on 17 carries. This also marked the first time in Nebraska's 46 bowl game history that it has shut out a team in postseason. However, this was the third time in Arizona's bowl history that they have been shut out, the second time in a game in San Diego. The Wildcats lost the 1921 San Diego East-West Christmas Classic to Centre College 38–0 and the 1990 Aloha Bowl to Syracuse 28–0. The game also marked Nebraska's first 10-win season since 2003.

=== Scoring summary ===
Scoring Play	Score
1st Quarter
NE — Zac Lee 4-yard rush (Alex Henery kick), 13:45	NE 7–0
NE — Alex Henery 47-yard field goal, 8:53	NE 10–0
2nd Quarter
NE — Rex Burkhead 5-yard rush (Alex Henery kick), 11:57	NE 17–0
NE — Alex Henery 50-yard field goal, 8:25	NE 20–0
NE — Alex Henery 41-yard field goal, 0:35	NE 23–0
3rd Quarter
NE — Alex Henery 22-yard field goal, 10:07	NE 26–0
NE — Niles Paul 74-yard pass from Zac Lee (Alex Henery kick), 3:39	NE 33–0
4th Quarter
None	
