= Mike McNeill =

Mike McNeill may refer to:

- Mike McNeill (ice hockey)
- Mike McNeill (American football)
