= 2009 Big 12 Conference football season =

American college football season

- League: NCAA Division I FBS (Football Bowl Subdivision)
- Sport: football
- Teams: 12
- TV partner(s): ABC, Fox Sports Net, ESPN, Versus, Fox College Sports

Regular season
- North champions: Nebraska Cornhuskers
- South champions: Texas Longhorns

Big 12 Championship Game
- Champions: Texas Longhorns

Football seasons
- 2008 2010

2009 Big 12 Conference football standings
	Conf.			Overall
Team	W		L	W		L
North Division
No. 14 Nebraska x	6	–	2	10	–	4
Missouri	4	–	4	8	–	5
Kansas State	4	–	4	6	–	6
Iowa State	3	–	5	7	–	6
Colorado	2	–	6	3	–	9
Kansas	1	–	7	5	–	7
South Division
No. 2 Texas x$	8	–	0	13	–	1
Oklahoma State	6	–	2	9	–	4
No. 21 Texas Tech	5	–	3	9	–	4
Oklahoma	5	–	3	8	–	5
Texas A&M	3	–	5	6	–	7
Baylor	1	–	7	4	–	8
Championship: Texas 13, Nebraska 12
$ – BCS representative as conference champion; x – Division champion/co-champions; Rankings from AP Poll

The 2009 Big 12 Conference football season was the 14th season for the Big 12, as part of the 2009 NCAA Division I FBS football season.

== Preseason ==
=== Coaching changes ===
School	Outgoing coach	Reason	Replacement
Iowa State	Gene Chizik	Hired as head coach at Auburn	Paul Rhoads
Kansas State	Ron Prince	Fired	Bill Snyder

=== Media Poll ===
North
1	Nebraska	172 (17)
2	Kansas	164 (12)
3	Missouri	124 (3)
4	Colorado	100
5	Kansas State	81
6	Iowa State	33

South
1	Texas	174 (17)
1	Oklahoma	174 (15)
3	Oklahoma State	130
4	Texas Tech	89
5	Baylor	75
6	Texas A&M	33

Ranked by total points, first place votes shown in parentheses.

== Rankings ==
Legend
	Improvement in ranking
	Drop in ranking
	Not ranked previous week
RV	Received votes but were not ranked in Top 25 of poll

		Pre	Wk 1	Wk 2	Wk 3	Wk 4	Wk 5	Wk 6	Wk 7	Wk 8	Wk 9	Wk 10	Wk 11	Wk 12	Wk 13	Wk 14	Final
Baylor	AP		RV	RV													
Baylor	C		RV														
Baylor	BCS	Not released															
Colorado	AP																
Colorado	C	RV															
Colorado	BCS	Not released															
Iowa State	AP																
Iowa State	C																
Iowa State	BCS	Not released															
Kansas	AP	25	24	22	20	18	16	17	24	RV							
Kansas	C	RV	25	23	19	16	15	15	21	RV							
Kansas	BCS	Not released							25								
Kansas State	AP											RV					
Kansas State	C										RV	RV					
Kansas State	BCS	Not released															
Missouri	AP	RV	25	RV	RV	RV	24	RV	RV						RV	RV	
Missouri	C	RV	RV	25	21	23	18	24	RV					RV	RV	RV	
Missouri	BCS	Not released															
Nebraska	AP	24	22	19	25	23	21	15	RV			RV	RV	RV	21	20	14
Nebraska	C	22	18	18	24	24	22	17	RV			RV	25	23	20	19	14
Nebraska	BCS	Not released													22	22	
Oklahoma	AP	3	13	12	10	8	19	20	25	22	20		RV		RV	RV	RV
Oklahoma	C	3	14	12	9	8	21	18	RV	23	20	RV	RV		RV	RV	RV
Oklahoma	BCS	Not released									24						
Oklahoma State	AP	9	5	16	16	14	15	16	14	13	18	17	12	11	22	21	RV
Oklahoma State	C	11	6	17	16	12	13	14	12	13	18	18	13	12	21	18	25
Oklahoma State	BCS	Not released							15	14	19	19	12	12	20	19	
Texas	AP	2	2	2	2	2	2	3	3	3	2	2	3	3	3	2	2
Texas	C	2	2	2	2	2	2	2	3	3	2	2	2	2	2	2	2
Texas	BCS	Not released							3	3	2	3	3	3	3	2	
Texas A&M	AP																
Texas A&M	C					RV											
Texas A&M	BCS	Not released															
Texas Tech	AP	RV	RV	RV	RV			RV	21	RV	RV	RV	RV	RV	RV	RV	21
Texas Tech	C	RV	RV	RV	RV				24	RV	RV	RV	RV	RV	RV	RV	23
Texas Tech	BCS	Not released															

== All-Big 12 Teams & Awards ==
=== First Team ===
Offense
QB Colt McCoy – Texas
RB Daniel Thomas – Kansas State
RB Keith Toston – Oklahoma State
FB Bryant Ward – Oklahoma State
WR Jordan Shipley – Texas
WR Danario Alexander – Missouri
WR Dezmon Briscoe – Kansas
TE Jeron Mastrud – Kansas State
OL Russell Okung – Oklahoma State
OL Trent Williams – Oklahoma
OL Nick Stringer – Kansas State
OL Brandon Carter – Texas Tech
OL Nate Solder – Colorado
PK Grant Ressel – Missouri
KR/PR Brandon Banks – Kansas State

Defense
DL Ndamukong Suh – Nebraska
DL Gerald McCoy – Oklahoma
DL Von Miller – Texas A&M
DL Brandon Sharpe – Texas Tech
DL Jared Crick – Nebraska
LB Sean Weatherspoon – Missouri
LB Jesse Smith – Iowa State
LB Travis Lewis – Oklahoma
DB Earl Thomas – Texas
DB Perrish Cox – Oklahoma State
DB Dominique Franks – Oklahoma
DB Prince Amukamara – Nebraska
DB Larry Asante – Nebraska
P Derek Epperson – Baylor

=== Second Team ===
Offense
QB Jerrod Johnson – Texas A&M
RB Roy Helu Jr. – Nebraska
RB DeMarco Murray – Oklahoma
FB Jamie McCoy – Texas A&M
WR Ryan Broyles – Oklahoma
WR Kerry Meier – Kansas
WR Brandon Banks – Kansas State
TE Riar Geer – Colorado
OL J.D. Walton – Baylor
OL Chris Hall – Texas
OL Kurtis Gregory – Missouri
OL Adam Ulatoski – Texas
OL Brody Eldridge – Oklahoma
OL Lee Grimes – Texas A&M
PK Alex Henery – Nebraska
KR/PR Perrish Cox – Oklahoma State

Defense
DL Sergio Kindle – Texas
DL Lamarr Houston – Texas
DL Jeremy Beal – Oklahoma
DL Jaron Baston – Missouri
DL Daniel Howard – Texas Tech
LB Joe Pawelek – Baylor
LB Roddrick Muckelroy – Texas
LB Phillip Dillard – Nebraska
DB Jamar Wall – Texas Tech
DB Quinton Carter – Oklahoma
DB Brian Jackson – Oklahoma
DB Jordan Lake – Baylor
DB Cha’pelle Brown – Colorado
DB Trent Hunter – Texas A&M
P Tress Way – Oklahoma

=== Individual awards ===
Coach of the Year: Mack Brown – Texas
Offensive Lineman of the Year: Russell Okung – Oklahoma State
Defensive Lineman of the Year: Ndamukong Suh – Nebraska
Offensive Freshman of the Year: Christine Michael – Texas A&M
Defensive Freshman of the Year: Aldon Smith – Missouri
Special Teams Player of the Year: Brandon Banks – Kansas State
Defensive Newcomer of the Year: David Sims – Iowa State
Offensive Newcomer of the Year: Daniel Thomas – Kansas State
Defensive Player of the Year: Ndamukong Suh – Nebraska
Offensive Player of the Year: Colt McCoy – Texas

== Records against other conferences ==
Conference	Wins	Losses
All FCS	9	0
Conference USA	8	2
Sun Belt	4	1
Mountain West	4	2
Big Ten	3	1
MAC	3	1
WAC	2	0
Pac-10	2	1
ACC	2	2
Independents	1	1
SEC	1	3
Big East	0	2
Overall	39	16

== Bowl games ==
Bowl Game	Date	Stadium	City	Television	Matchup/Results	Attendance	Payout (US$)
AdvoCare V100 Independence Bowl	December 28, 2009	Independence Stadium	Shreveport, Louisiana	ESPN2	Georgia 44, Texas A&M 20	49,653	$1,100,000
Pacific Life Holiday Bowl	December 30, 2009	Qualcomm Stadium	San Diego, California	ESPN	Nebraska 33, Arizona 0	64,607	$2,130,000
Brut Sun Bowl	December 31, 2009	Sun Bowl Stadium	El Paso, Texas	CBS	Oklahoma 31, Stanford 27	53,713	$1,900,000
Texas Bowl	December 31, 2009	Reliant Stadium	Houston, Texas	ESPN	Navy 35, Missouri 13	69,441	$750,000
Insight Bowl	December 31, 2009	Sun Devil Stadium	Tempe, Arizona	NFL Network	Iowa State 14, Minnesota 13	45,090	$1,200,000
AT&T Cotton Bowl Classic	January 2, 2009	Cowboys Stadium	Arlington, Texas	FOX	Ole Miss 21, Oklahoma State 7	77,928	$6,750,000
Valero Energy Alamo Bowl	January 2, 2010	Alamodome	San Antonio, Texas	ESPN	Texas Tech 41, Michigan State 31	64,757	$2,200,000
2010 Citi BCS National Championship Game	January 7, 2010	Rose Bowl	Pasadena, California	ABC	Alabama 37, Texas 21	94,906	$31,000,000

== Attendance ==
Team	Stadium (Capacity)	Game 1	Game 2	Game 3	Game 4	Game 5	Game 6	Game 7	Game 8	Total	Average	% of Capacity
Baylor	Floyd Casey Stadium (50,000)	40,147	36,452	27,047	38,117	31,702	44,372			217,837	36,306	72.6
Colorado	Folsom Field (53,750)	53,168	50,535	51,146	45,634	47,227	52,817			300,527	50,087	93.2
Iowa State	Jack Trice Stadium (55,000)	48,831	52,089	50,532	42,253	40,540	43,208			277,453	46,242	84.1
Kansas	Memorial Stadium (50,071)	52,530	50,101	50,025	48,203	51,104	51,525			303,488	50,581	101.0
Kansas State	Bill Snyder Family Football Stadium (52,200)	50,750	48,094	44,934	42,019	48,306	46,476			280,579	46,763	89.6
Missouri	Faurot Field (71,004)	65,401	61,617	65,826	71,004	65,298	55,573			384,719	64,120	90.3
Nebraska	Memorial Stadium (81,067)	85,719	85,035	86,304	86,107	85,938	86,115	85,998		601,216	85,888	105.9
Oklahoma	Gaylord Family Oklahoma Memorial Stadium (82,112)	84,749	84,803	84,478	84,021	85,013	85,606			508,670	84,778	103.2
Oklahoma State	Boone Pickens Stadium (60,218)	53,012	50,875	51,803	56,901	55,752	58,516	52,811	50,080	429,750	53,719	89.2
Texas	Darrell K Royal–Texas Memorial Stadium (101,119)	101,096	101,297	101,144	101,152	101,003	101,357			607,049	101,175	100.1
Texas A&M	Kyle Field (83,002)	73,887	73,599	74,656	76,153	72,530	82,106	84,671		537,607	76,800	92.5
Texas Tech	Jones AT&T Stadium (60,454)	47,824	48,124	52,909	47,382	57,733	47,291	50,479		351,742	50,248	82.4
