= 2010 All-Big 12 Conference football team =

Sports team

The 2010 All-Big 12 Conference football team consists of American football players chosen as All-Big 12 Conference players for the 2010 Big 12 Conference football season. The conference recognizes two official All-Big 12 selectors: (1) the Big 12 conference coaches selected separate offensive and defensive units and named first- and second-team players (the "Coaches" team); and (2) a panel of sports writers and broadcasters covering the Big 12 also selected offensive and defensive units and named first- and second-team players (the "Media" team).

== Offensive selections ==
=== Quarterbacks ===
- Brandon Weeden, Oklahoma State (Coaches-1; Media-1)
- Robert Griffin III, Baylor (Coaches-2)
- Landry Jones, Oklahoma (Media-2)

=== Running backs ===
- Kendall Hunter, Oklahoma State (Coaches-1; Media-1)
- Daniel Thomas, Kansas State (Coaches-2; Media-1)
- DeMarco Murray, Oklahoma (Coaches-1)
- Cyrus Gray, Texas A&M (Media-2)
- Rodney Stewart, Colorado (Media-2)
- Roy Helu Jr., Nebraska (Coaches-2)

=== Fullbacks ===
- Bryant Ward, Oklahoma State (Coaches-1)
- Trey Millard, Oklahoma (Coaches-2)

=== Centers ===
- Tim Barnes, Missouri (Coaches-1; Media-1)
- Wade Weibert, Kansas State (Media-1)
- Matt Allen, Texas A&M (Coaches-2)
- Ben Lamaak, Iowa State (Coaches-2)

=== Guards ===
- Ricky Henry, Nebraska (Coaches-1; Media-1)
- Danny Watkins, Baylor (Coaches-2; Media-1)
- Zach Kendall, Kansas State (Coaches-2; Media-2)

=== Tackles ===
- Levy Adcock, Oklahoma State (Coaches-1; Media-1)
- Nate Solder, Colorado (Coaches-1; Media-1)
- Eric Mensik, Oklahoma (Coaches-1; Media-2)
- Lonnie Edwards, Texas Tech (Coaches-2)
- Dan Hoch, Missouri (Media-2)
- Mickey Okafor, Texas Tech (Media-2)

=== Tight ends ===
- Michael Egnew, Missouri (Coaches-1; Media-1)
- Collin Franklin, Iowa State (Coaches-2; Media-2)

=== Receivers ===
- Justin Blackmon, Oklahoma State (Coaches-1; Media-1)
- Ryan Broyles, Oklahoma (Coaches-1; Media-1)
- Jeff Fuller, Texas A&M (Coaches-1; Media-2)
- Kendall Wright, Baylor (Coaches-2)
- Niles Paul, Nebraska (Coaches-2)
- T. J. Moe, Missouri (Coaches-2)
- Lyle Leong, Texas Tech (Media-2)

== Defensive selections ==
=== Defensive linemen ===
- Sam Acho, Texas (Coaches-1; Media-1)
- Jeremy Beal, Oklahoma (Coaches-1; Media-1)
- Jared Crick, Nebraska (Coaches-1; Media-1)
- Colby Whitlock, Texas Tech (Coaches-2; Media-1)
- Pierre Allen, Nebraska (Coaches-1)
- Aldon Smith, Missouri (Coaches-1)
- Josh Hartigan, Colorado (Media-2)
- Brad Madison, Missouri (Media-2)
- Lucas Patterson, Texas A&M (Media-2)
- Phil Taylor, Baylor (Coaches-2; Media-2)
- Ugo Chinasa, Oklahoma State (Coaches-2)
- Jacquies Smith, Missouri (Coaches-2)
- Cameron Meredith, Nebraska (Coaches-2)

=== Linebackers ===
- Lavonte David, Nebraska (Coaches-1; Media-1)
- Orie Lemon, Oklahoma State (Coaches-1; Media-1)
- Von Miller, Texas A&M (Coaches-1; Media-1)
- Andrew Gachkar, Missouri (Media-1)
- Travis Lewis, Oklahoma (Coaches-2; Media-2)
- Jake Knott, Iowa State (Coaches-2; Media-2)
- Emmanuel Acho, Texas (Coaches-2)
- Michael Hodges, Texas A&M (Media-2)
- Keenan Robinson, Texas (Media-2)

=== Defensive backs ===
- Prince Amukamara, Nebraska (Coaches-1; Media-1)
- Eric Hagg, Nebraska (Coaches-1; Media-1)
- Quinton Carter, Oklahoma (Coaches-1; Media-2)
- Andrew McGee, Oklahoma State (Coaches-1; Media-2)
- Jamell Fleming, Oklahoma (Media-1)
- Byron Landor, Baylor (Media-1)
- Jimmy Smith, Colorado (Coaches-1)
- Alfonzo Dennard, Nebraska (Coaches-2; Media-2)
- Aaron Williams, Texas (Coaches-2; Media-2)
- Leonard Johnson, Iowa State (Coaches-2)
- Coryell Judie, Texas A&M (Coaches-2)
- Ty Zimmerman, Kansas State (Coaches-2)
- Curtis Brown, Texas (Coaches-2)

== Special teams ==
=== Kickers ===
- Dan Bailey, Oklahoma State (Coaches-1; Media-2)
- Alex Henery, Nebraska (Coaches-2; Media-1)

=== Punters ===
- Quinn Sharp, Oklahoma State (Coaches-1; Media-1)
- Alex Henery, Nebraska (Coaches-2)
- Kirby Van Der Kamp, Iowa State (Media-2)

=== All-purpose / Return specialists ===
- DeMarco Murray, Oklahoma (Media-1)
- William Powell, Kansas State (Coaches-1)
- Niles Paul, Nebraska (Coaches-2)
- Eric Stephens, Texas Tech (Media-2)

== Key ==
Bold = selected as a first-team player by both the coaches and media panel

Coaches = selected by Big 12 Conference coaches

Media = selected by a media panel

== See also ==
- 2010 College Football All-America Team
