= 2009 Oklahoma State Cowboys football team =

American college football season

2009 Oklahoma State Cowboys football

Cotton Bowl Classic, L 7–21 vs. Ole Miss
- Conference: Big 12 Conference
- South

Ranking
- Coaches: No. 25
- Record: 9–4 (6–2 Big 12)
- Head coach: Mike Gundy (5th season)
- Offensive coordinator: Gunter Brewer (2nd season)
- Offensive scheme: Spread option
- Defensive coordinator: Bill Young (1st season)
- Base defense: 4–3
- Home stadium: Boone Pickens Stadium (Capacity: 60,218)

Uniform

2009 Big 12 Conference football standings
	Conf.			Overall
Team	W		L	W		L
North Division
No. 14 Nebraska x	6	–	2	10	–	4
Missouri	4	–	4	8	–	5
Kansas State	4	–	4	6	–	6
Iowa State	3	–	5	7	–	6
Colorado	2	–	6	3	–	9
Kansas	1	–	7	5	–	7
South Division
No. 2 Texas x$	8	–	0	13	–	1
Oklahoma State	6	–	2	9	–	4
No. 21 Texas Tech	5	–	3	9	–	4
Oklahoma	5	–	3	8	–	5
Texas A&M	3	–	5	6	–	7
Baylor	1	–	7	4	–	8
Championship: Texas 13, Nebraska 12
$ – BCS representative as conference champion; x – Division champion/co-champions; Rankings from AP Poll

The 2009 Oklahoma State Cowboys football team represented Oklahoma State University in the 2009 NCAA Division I FBS football season. The Cowboys, led by fifth-year head coach Mike Gundy, played their home games at Boone Pickens Stadium. The Cowboys finished the season 9–4, 6–2 in Big 12 play and lost the Cotton Bowl Classic, 21–7, against Ole Miss.

== Schedule ==
Date	Time	Opponent	Rank	Site	TV	Result	Attendance
September 5	2:30 p.m.	No. 13 Georgia*	No. 9	Boone Pickens Stadium; Stillwater, OK	ABC	W 24–10	53,012
September 12	2:30 p.m.	Houston*	No. 5	Boone Pickens Stadium; Stillwater, OK	FSN	L 35–45	50,875
September 19	6:00 p.m.	Rice*	No. 16	Boone Pickens Stadium; Stillwater, OK		W 41–24	51,803
September 26	6:00 p.m.	Grambling State*	No. 16	Boone Pickens Stadium; Stillwater, OK		W 56–6	56,901
October 10	11:30 a.m.	at Texas A&M	No. 15	Kyle Field; College Station, TX	FSN	W 36–31	76,153
October 17	8:15 p.m.	Missouri^{†}	No. 16	Boone Pickens Stadium; Stillwater, OK	ESPN2	W 33–17	55,752
October 24	11:30 a.m.	at Baylor	No. 14	Floyd Casey Stadium; Waco, TX	Versus	W 34–7	38,117
October 31	7:00 p.m.	No. 3 Texas	No. 13	Boone Pickens Stadium; Stillwater, OK	ABC/ESPN2	L 14–41	58,516
November 7	2:30 p.m.	at Iowa State	No. 18	Jack Trice Stadium; Ames, IA	ABC	W 34–8	40,540
November 14	7:00 p.m.	Texas Tech	No. 17	Boone Pickens Stadium; Stillwater, OK	ABC	W 24–17	52,811
November 19	6:30 p.m.	Colorado	No. 12	Boone Pickens Stadium; Stillwater, OK	ESPN	W 31–28	50,080
November 28	11:30 a.m.	at Oklahoma	No. 11	Gaylord Family Oklahoma Memorial Stadium; Norman, OK (Bedlam Game)	FSN	L 0–27	85,606
January 2	1:00 p.m.	vs. Ole Miss*	No. 21	Cowboys Stadium; Arlington, TX (Cotton Bowl Classic)	FOX	L 7–21	77,928
*Non-conference game; ^{†}Homecoming; Rankings from AP Poll released prior to the game; All times are in Central time

== Rankings ==
Ranking movements Legend: ██ Increase in ranking ██ Decrease in ranking RV = Received votes
	Week															
Poll	Pre	1	2	3	4	5	6	7	8	9	10	11	12	13	14	Final
AP	9	5	16	16	14	15	16	14	13	18	17	12	11	22	21	RV
Coaches	11	6	17	16	12	13	14	12	13	18	18	13	12	21	18	25
Harris	Not released				15	14	15	14	13	18	18	13	12	20	17	Not released
BCS	Not released							15	14	19	19	12	12	20	19	Not released

== Game summaries ==
=== Colorado ===
Colorado at #12 Oklahoma State

Team	1	2	3	4	Total
Colorado	7	7	7	7	28
• Oklahoma State	7	3	7	14	31

- Date: November 19
- Location: Boone Pickens Stadium, Stillwater, Oklahoma
- Game start: 6:30 p.m. CDT
- Television network: ESPN
- Source: ESPN

Scoring summary
1	12:39	OKST	Perrish Cox 67 yard punt return (Dan Bailey kick)	OKST 7-0
1	7:16	COLO	Scotty McKnight 5 yard pass from Tyler Hansen (Aric Goodman kick)	Tied 7-7
2	5:40	OKST	Dan Bailey 30 yard field goal	OKST 10-7
2	0:22	COLO	Riar Greer 5 yard pass from Cody Hawkins (Aric Goodman kick)	COLO 14-10
3	8:41	COLO	Markques Sims 28 yard pass from Tyler Hansen (Aric Goodman kick)	COLO 21-10
3	3:52	OKST	Keith Toston 45 yard run (Dan Bailey kick)	COLO 21-17
4	11:24	OKST	Keith Toston 47 yard pass from Brandon Weeden (Dan Bailey kick)	OKST 24-21
4	11:11	COLO	Brian Lockridge 98 yard kickoff return (Aric Goodman kick)	COLO 28-24
4	8:11	OKST	Justin Blackmon 28 yard pass from Brandon Weeden (Dan Bailey kick)	OKST 31-24

== Awards ==
- Big 12 Offensive Lineman of the Year: Russell Okung
- First Team All-American: Perrish Cox, Russell Okung
- All-Big 12: Perrish Cox (1st team DB, 2nd team KR/PR), Russell Okung (1st), Keith Toston (1st), Bryant Ward (1st)

== 2009 team players in the NFL ==
The following players were selected in the 2010 NFL draft:

Player	Position	Round	Pick	NFL team
Russell Okung	OT	1	6	Seattle Seahawks
Dez Bryant	WR	1	24	Dallas Cowboys
Perrish Cox	CB	5	137	Denver Broncos
Zac Robinson	QB	7	250	New England Patriots

The following Cowboys were signed as undrafted free agents:

- Offensive lineman Brady Bond by the San Diego Chargers.
- Offensive lineman Noah Franklin by the Carolina Panthers.
- Offensive lineman Andrew Lewis by the Kansas City Chiefs.
- Defensive tackle Swanson Miller by the Cleveland Browns.
- Andrew Mitchell by the Cincinnati Bengals.
- Keith Toston by the St. Louis Rams.
