= 2009 Iowa State Cyclones football team =

American college football season

2009 Iowa State Cyclones football

Insight Bowl champion

Insight Bowl, W 14–13 vs. Minnesota
- Conference: Big 12 Conference
- North Division
- Record: 7–6 (3–5 Big 12)
- Head coach: Paul Rhoads (1st season)
- Offensive coordinator: Tom Herman (1st season)
- Offensive scheme: Spread
- Defensive coordinator: Wally Burnham (1st season)
- Base defense: 4–3
- Home stadium: Jack Trice Stadium

2009 Big 12 Conference football standings
	Conf.			Overall
Team	W		L	W		L
North Division
No. 14 Nebraska x	6	–	2	10	–	4
Missouri	4	–	4	8	–	5
Kansas State	4	–	4	6	–	6
Iowa State	3	–	5	7	–	6
Colorado	2	–	6	3	–	9
Kansas	1	–	7	5	–	7
South Division
No. 2 Texas x$	8	–	0	13	–	1
Oklahoma State	6	–	2	9	–	4
No. 21 Texas Tech	5	–	3	9	–	4
Oklahoma	5	–	3	8	–	5
Texas A&M	3	–	5	6	–	7
Baylor	1	–	7	4	–	8
Championship: Texas 13, Nebraska 12
$ – BCS representative as conference champion; x – Division champion/co-champions; Rankings from AP Poll

The 2009 Iowa State Cyclones football team represented Iowa State University as a member of the North Division in the Big 12 Conference during the 2009 NCAA Division I FBS football season. Led by first-year head coach Paul Rhoads, the Cyclones compiled an overall record of 7–6 with a mark of 3–5 in conference play, placing fourth in the Big 12's North Division. Iowa State was invited to the Insight Bowl, where the Cyclones defeated Minnesota. The team played home games at Jack Trice Stadium in Ames, Iowa.

== Schedule ==
Date	Time	Opponent	Site	TV	Result	Attendance	Source
September 3	7:00 p.m.	North Dakota State*	Jack Trice Stadium; Ames, IA	MC22	W 34–17	48,831	
September 12	11:00 a.m.	Iowa*	Jack Trice Stadium; Ames, IA (rivalry)	FSN	L 3–35	52,089	
September 19	6:00 p.m.	at Kent State*	Dix Stadium; Kent, OH	ESPN360	W 34–14	15,808	
September 26	6:00 p.m.	Army*	Jack Trice Stadium; Ames, IA	CYtv	W 31–10	50,532	
October 3	2:00 p.m.	vs. Kansas State	Arrowhead Stadium; Kansas City, MO (rivalry)	FCS	L 23–24	40,851	
October 10	11:30 a.m.	at No. 16 Kansas	Memorial Stadium; Lawrence, KS	Versus	L 36–41	48,203	
October 17	6:00 p.m.	Baylor^{†}	Jack Trice Stadium; Ames, IA		W 24–10	42,253	
October 24	11:30 a.m.	at Nebraska	Memorial Stadium; Lincoln, NE (rivalry)	FSN	W 9–7	85,938	
October 31	2:30 p.m.	at Texas A&M	Kyle Field; College Station, TX		L 10–35	72,530	
November 7	2:30 p.m.	No. 18 Oklahoma State	Jack Trice Stadium; Ames, IA	ABC	L 8–34	40,540	
November 14	1:00 p.m.	Colorado	Jack Trice Stadium; Ames, IA		W 17–10	43,208	
November 21	1:00 p.m.	at Missouri	Faurot Field; Columbia, MO (rivalry)		L 24–34	55,573	
December 31	5:00 p.m.	vs. Minnesota*	Sun Devil Stadium; Tempe, AZ (Insight Bowl)	NFLN	W 14–13	45,090	
*Non-conference game; ^{†}Homecoming; Rankings from AP Poll released prior to the game; All times are in Central time

== Game summaries ==
=== Iowa ===
Iowa at Iowa State

Team	1	2	3	4	Total
• Hawkeyes	7	7	14	7	35
Cyclones	3	0	0	0	3

- Date: September 12
- Location: Jack Trice Stadium, Ames, Iowa
- Game start: 11:05 a.m.
- Game attendance: 52,089
- Game weather: 72 °F (22 °C) (Mostly Hazy)
- Referee: Dave Witvoet
- TV announcers (FSN): Joel Meyers, Dave Lapham and Jim Knox

Scoring summary
1	2:33	Iowa St	Grant Mahoney 46-yard field goal	Iowa St 3-0
1	1:43	Iowa	Grant Morse 1-yard pass from Ricky Stanzi (Daniel Murray kick)	Iowa 7-3
2	2:56	Iowa	Derrell Johnson-Koulianos 18-yard pass from Ricky Stanzi (Daniel Murray kick)	Iowa 14-3
3	9:25	Iowa	Allen Reisner 7-yard pass from Ricky Stanzi (Daniel Murray kick)	Iowa 21-3
3	4:27	Iowa	Brandon Wegher 1-yard run (Daniel Murray kick)	Iowa 28-3
4	5:49	Iowa	Keenan Davis 10-yard pass from Ricky Stanzi (Daniel Murray kick)	Iowa 35-3

=== at Nebraska ===
Iowa State at Nebraska

Team	1	2	3	4	Total
• Cyclones	3	6	0	0	9
Cornhuskers	7	0	0	0	7

- Date: October 24
- Location: Memorial Stadium, Lincoln, Nebraska
- Game start: 11:41 a.m. CDT
- Elapsed time: 3:09
- Game attendance: 85,938
- Game weather: Overcast, 44 °F (7 °C), Wind SSE@3 mph (4.8 km/h)
- Referee: Karl Richins
- TV announcers (FSN): Joel Meyers (Play-by-play), Dave Lapham (Color) & Jim Knox (Sideline)

The Cyclones entered Memorial Stadium without their leading quarterback and rushing threat and subsequently played an error-free game. The solid effort was enough to put up nine points in the first half to lead Nebraska by two, which concluded the game's scoring. The nine points turned out to be sufficient to win against the poor Cornhusker offensive effort, which turned over the ball a school-record eight times (including four inside of Iowa State's five-yard line). The turnovers negated Nebraska's 362–239 edge in yards gained.

The Cyclones enjoyed their first win in Memorial Stadium since 1977. First-year Head coach Paul Rhoads said about the game, "When you don't win in a stadium on the road since 1977, it's big."

External videos
- Iowa State post-game celebration

== Personnel ==
=== Roster ===
2009 Iowa State Cyclones football team roster
Players
Coaches
Offense

Pos.	#	Name	Class
QB	4	Austen Arnaud	Jr
QB	8	Brett Bueker
QB	11	Jerome Tiller
RB		Brad Adams
RB	33	Alexander Robinson
RB	23	Jeremiah Schwartz	Fr
RB	34	Johnny Williams
FB	26	Taylor Mansfield
WR	20	Jason Carlson
WR	6	Darius Darks
WR	18	Wallace Franklin
WR	82	Marquis Hamilton
WR		Ethan Hokel
WR	19	Josh Lenz	Fr
WR	2	Sedrick Johnson
WR	15	Houston Jones
WR	80	Andrew Mitchell
WR	36	Patrick Mulcahy
WR	10	Lonzie Range
WR	83	Jake Williams
WR	17	Joel Zitek
OL	77	Alex Alvarez
OL	71	Trey Baysinger
OL	68	Tadd Bergan
OL	79	Brayden Burris
OL	70	Drew Davis
OL	51	Scott Haughton
OL	75	Hayworth Hicks
OL	67	Matt Hulbert
OL	52	Mike Knapp
OL	63	Ben Lamaak
OL	72	Kelechi Osemele
OL	50	Sean Smith
OL	76	Zack Spears
OL	73	Reggie Stephens	Sr
OL	64	Ethan Tuftee
OL	74	Joe Vanstrom
TE	87	Carter Bykowski
TE	84	Derrick Catlett
TE	35	Vince Ewald
TE	88	Collin Franklin
TE	86	Kurt Hammerschmidt
TE	91	Patrick Neal

Defense

Pos.	#	Name	Class
DB	7	Kennard Banks
DB	12	Allen Bell
DB	22	Ter'ran Benton
DB	46	Andrew Crenshaw
DB	42	Tahaun Fountain
DB	23	Leonard Johnson
DB	15	Dustin Land
DB	1	Judah Linder
DB	19	A. J. Matthews
DB	9	Devin McDowell
DB	39	Matt Morton	Fr
DB	37	Michael O'Connell
DB	3	Zac Sandvig
DB	5	David Sims
DB	11	Chris Singleton
DB	2	James Smith
DB	36	Kyle Walker
LB	45	Kyle Benning
LB	27	Brian Ekwelundu	Sr
LB	43	Fred Garrin
LB	44	Kevin Hamlin
LB	59	Preston Kaufman
LB	26	Seth Moser
LB	16	Josh Raven
LB	31	Justin Rumple
LB	24	Derec Schmidgall
LB	54	Jesse Smith
LB	50	Frank Weymiller
DE	90	Cleyon Laing
DE	55	Christopher Lyle
DE	61	Cameron Murray
DL	96	Austin Alburtis
DL	85	Bailey Johnson
DL	98	Jerrod Black	So
DL	62	Nate Frere
DL	99	Chase Hurtig
DL	53	Joe Jacobs
DL	38	Roosevelt Maggitt
DL	94	Jake McDonough
DL	29	Rashawn Parker
DL	97	Stephen Ruempolhamer
DL	66	Kyle Slifka
DL	95	Spenser Zegers

Special teams

Pos.	#	Name	Class
K	25	Zach Guyer
K	16	Daniel Kuehl
K	21	Grant Mahoney	So
K	27	Michael Romey
P	13	Mike Brandtner
P	14	Chad Powell
DS	93	Sam Anker	Jr
DS	40	Zack Tucker	Fr
DS	49	David Wonders	Jr
DS	46	Dakota Zimmerman	So

Head coach

- Paul Rhoads

Coordinators/assistant coaches

- Tom Herman – Offensive Coordinator and Quarterbacks
- Wally Burnham – Offensive Coordinator

Legend

- (C) Team captain
- (S) Suspended
- (I) Ineligible
- Injured
- Redshirt

=== Recruiting ===
College recruiting information
Name	Hometown	School	Height	Weight	40^{‡}	Commit date
Joshua Bellamy; WR	St. Petersburg, Florida	Butte College	6 ft 1 in (1.85 m)	195 lb (88 kg)	4.4	Jan 11, 2009
Joshua Bellamy; WR	Recruit ratings: Scout: Rivals:					
Beau Blankenship; RB	Norman, Oklahoma	Norman North H.S. (OK)	5 ft 8 in (1.73 m)	207 lb (94 kg)	4.47	Jul 24, 2008
Beau Blankenship; RB	Recruit ratings: Scout: Rivals: (76)					
Overall recruit ranking: Scout: 79 Rivals: 73
‡ Refers to 40-yard dash; Note: In many cases, Scout, Rivals, 247Sports, On3, and ESPN may conflict in their listings of height, weight and 40 time.; In these cases, the average was taken. ESPN grades are on a 100-point scale.; Sources: "Iowa State 2009 Football Commitments". Rivals.; "2009 Iowa State Commits". Scout.; "2009 Player Commitments – Iowa State". ESPN.; "Scout.com Team Recruiting Rankings". Scout.; "2009 Team Ranking". Rivals.com.

== Awards ==
=== Big 12 player of the week ===
Alexander Robinson
On September 28, Alexander Robinson was declared the Big 12 Co-Offensive player of the week after recording 178 yards of total offense and three touchdowns in Iowa State's win over Army. Robinson is the first Iowa State running back since Ennis Haywood in 2000 to record three consecutive 100- yard games.

== Statistics ==
=== Team ===
	Team	Opp
Scoring	185	151
Points per game	26.4	21.6
First downs	148	141
Rushing	74	55
Passing	69	78
Penalty	5	8
Total offense	2862	2707
Avg per play	5.7	5.6
Avg per game	408.9	386.7
Fumbles-Lost	13-8	17-6
Penalties-Yards	36-354	42-341
Avg per game	50.6	48.7

	Team	Opp
Punts-Yards	31-1348	43-1644
Avg per punt	43.5	38.2
Time of possession/Game	28:36	31:24
3rd down conversions	46/103	34/94
4th down conversions	3/5	4/5
Touchdowns scored	23	20
Field goals-Attempts-Long	9-14	4-6
PAT-Attempts	18-21	19-20
Attendance	193705	64011
Games/Avg per Game	4/48426	2/32006

==== Scores by quarter ====
	1	2	3	4	Total
Iowa State	53	86	73	41	253
Opponents	70	58	56	87	271

=== Offense ===
==== Rushing ====
Name	GP-GS	Att	Gain	Loss	Net	Avg	TD	Long	Avg/G
Robinson, Alexan	7	130	755	18	737	5.7	6	68	105.3
Arnaud, Austen	7	90	457	23	434	4.8	7	22	62.0
Schwartz, Jeremi	7	49	223	9	214	4.4	0	23	30.6
Total	7	290	1560	63	1497	5.2	14	68	213.9

==== Passing ====
Name	GP-GS	Effic	Att-Cmp-Int	Pct	Yds	TD	Lng	Avg/G
Arnaud, Austen	7	123.98	105-185-5	56.8	1246	9	54	178.0
Tiller, Jerome	4	76.91	14-26-2	53.8	119	0	17	29.8
Total	7	117.07	119-213-7	55.9	1365	9	54	195.0

==== Receiving ====
Name	GP-GS	No.	Yds	Avg	TD	Long	Avg/G
Hamilton, Marquis	7	31	479	15.5	3	42	68.4
Williams, Jake	7	23	234	10.2	2	23	33.4
Catlett, Derrick	7	17	215	12.6	2	27	30.7
Reynolds, Darius	4	13	72	5.5	0	18	18.0
Lenz, Josh	7	9	69	7.7	0	15	9.9
Robinson, Alexander	7	7	137	19.6	1	54	19.6
Franklin, Collin	7	7	65	9.3	0	16	9.3
Darks, Darius	7	7	48	6.9	1	18	6.9
Johnson, Sedrick	7	3	5	1.7	0	7	0.7
Schwartz, Jeremi	7	1	30	30.0	0	30	4.3
Zitek, Joel	7	1	11	11.0	0	11	1.6
Total	7	119	1365	11.5	9	54	195.0

=== Defense ===
Name	GP	Tackles				Sacks	Pass Defense		Interceptions				Fumbles		Blkd Kick
Name	GP	Solo	Ast	Total	TFL-Yds	No-Yds	BrUp	QBH	No.-Yds	Avg	TD	Long	Rcv-Yds	FF	Blkd Kick
Def 1															
Total															

=== Special teams ===
Name	Punting								Kickoffs				
Name	No.	Yds	Avg	Long	TB	FC	I20	Blkd	No.	Yds	Avg	TB	OB
Punter 1													
Kicker 1													
Total													

Name	Punt returns					Kick returns				
Name	No.	Yds	Avg	TD	Long	No.	Yds	Avg	TD	Long
Player 1										
Total										
