= DeJon Gomes =

American football player (born 1989)

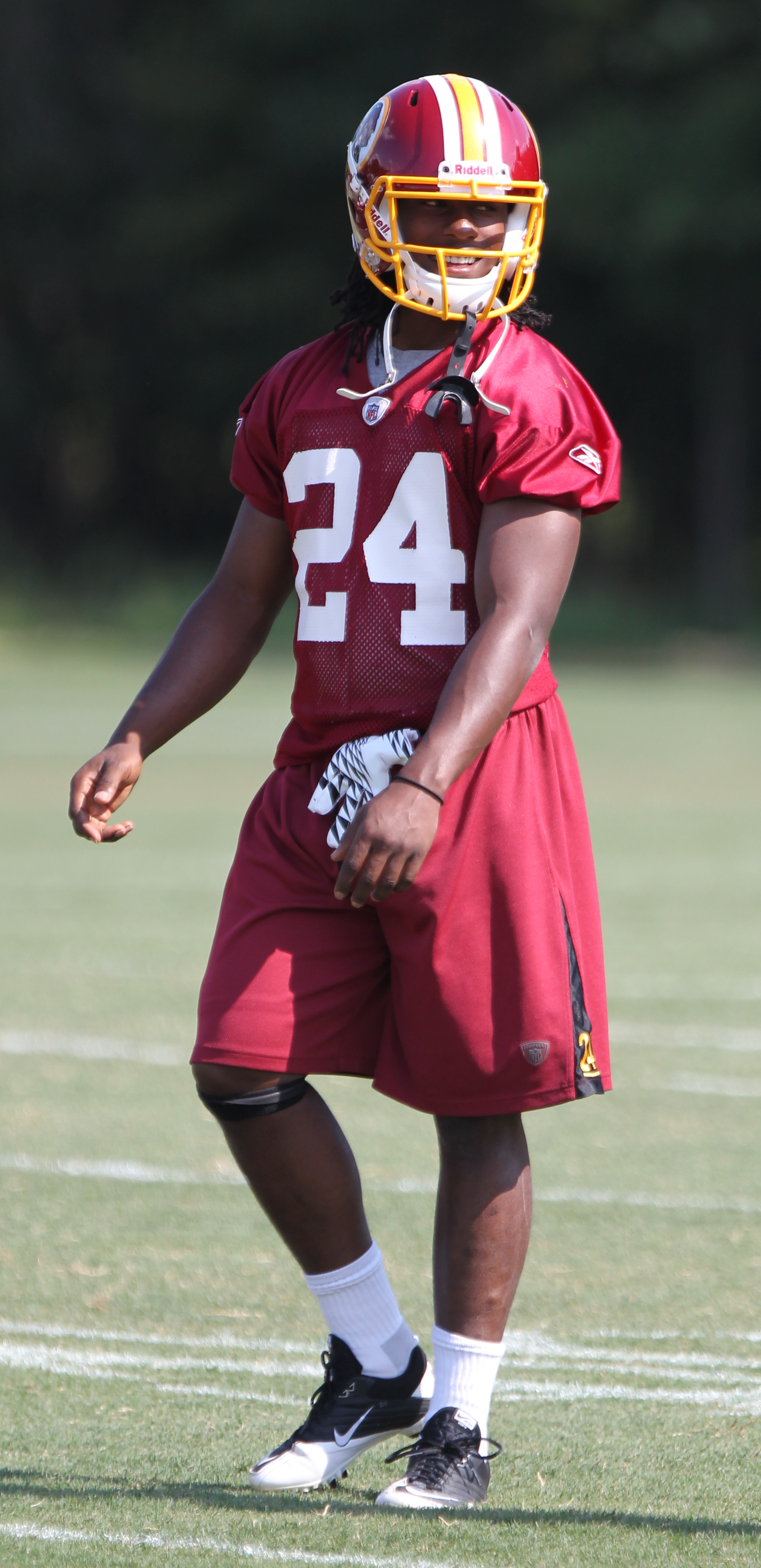
- Gomes with the Washington Redskins in 2011

No. 24
- Position: Safety

Personal information
- Born: November 17, 1989 (age 37); Hayward, California, U.S.
- Listed height: 6 ft 0 in (1.83 m)
- Listed weight: 201 lb (91 kg)

Career information
- High school: James Logan (Union City, California)
- College: Nebraska
- NFL draft: 2011: 5th round, 146th overall pick

Career history
- Washington Redskins (2011–2012); Detroit Lions (2013)

Career NFL statistics
- Total tackles: 84
- Fumble recoveries: 1
- Pass deflections: 6
- Interceptions: 1
- Stats at Pro Football Reference

DeJon "D.J." Gomes (born November 17, 1989) is an American former professional football player who was a safety in the National Football League (NFL). He was selected in the fifth round of the 2011 NFL draft by the Washington Redskins. Gomes played college football for the Nebraska Cornhuskers.

He was also a member of the Detroit Lions.

== Early life ==
Dejon Gomes attended high school at James Logan High School in Union City, California where he started for one year on the varsity football team, after sitting out the previous year with an injury. After graduating in 2007, he did not receive any top scholarship offers, so he decided to attend City College of San Francisco.

== College career ==
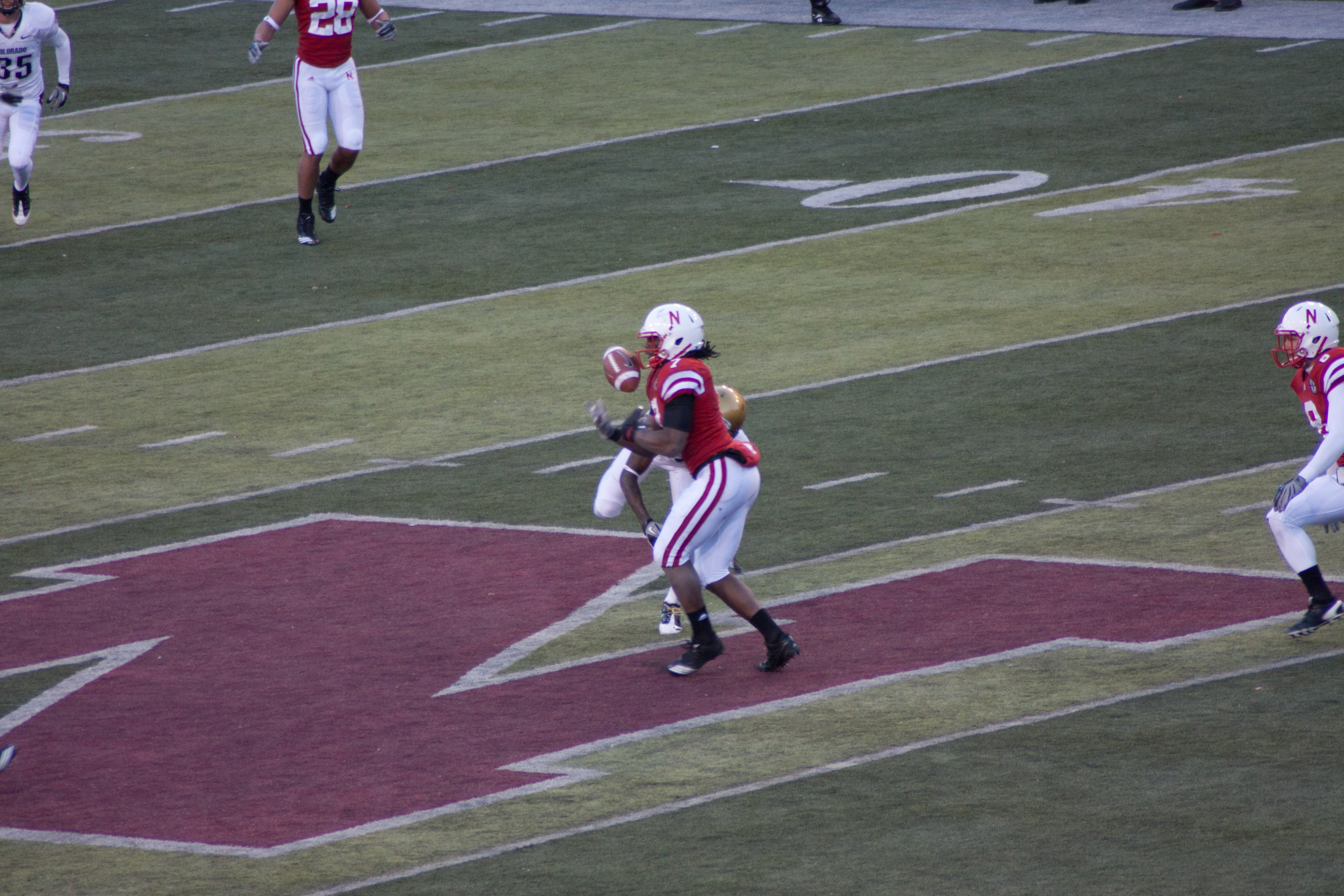
Gomes making an interception against the Colorado Buffaloes in 2010.

While at the City College of San Francisco, Gomes lead the state in interceptions, tackles, and fumble returns. Later on, Gomes transferred to the University of Nebraska–Lincoln. Once Gomes started his career with the Cornhuskers, he quickly became a starter for two years and lead the team in interceptions and tackles. He was billed as one of the top defensive back prospects for the 2011 NFL draft by many NFL Draft experts and analysts.

== Professional career ==
Pre-draft measurables
Height	Weight	Arm length	Hand span	Wingspan	40-yard dash	10-yard split	20-yard split	20-yard shuttle	Three-cone drill	Vertical jump	Broad jump	Bench press
5 ft 11 1/2 in (1.82 m)	208 lb (94 kg)	31 3/8 in (0.80 m)	9 5/8 in (0.24 m)	6 ft 3 7/8 in (1.93 m)	4.56 s	1.61 s	2.67 s	4.20 s	6.90 s	31.0 in (0.79 m)	9 ft 2 in (2.79 m)	13 reps
All values from NFL Combine/Pro Day

=== Washington Redskins ===
==== 2011 season ====
Gomes was selected by the Washington Redskins 146th overall in the 2011 NFL draft, joining college teammates, Roy Helu, who was selected earlier in the fourth round, and Niles Paul, who was drafted after him. Throughout the season, he played as the backup to both free safety, Oshiomogho Atogwe, and strong safety, LaRon Landry, splitting the responsibility with Reed Doughty. Gomes made his NFL debut in Week 1 against the New York Giants. He then had his first career start as a free safety in Week 11 against the Dallas Cowboys, where he made 14 tackles. After Landry was put on injured reserve, Gomes became the starting strong safety for the rest of the season. On December 24, 2011, while playing against the Minnesota Vikings, Gomes tackled Adrian Peterson which resulted in Peterson tearing his ACL and MCL. Gomes finished the 2011 season playing 15 games, starting five of them, and recording 35 tackles and two pass breakups.

==== 2012 season ====
By the start of the 2012 season, Gomes was made the starting strong safety in place of an injured Brandon Meriweather. In the season opener win against the New Orleans Saints, he recorded his first pass deflection and first interception on Drew Brees. By Week 4 of the 2012 season, he lost the starting strong safety position to Reed Doughty. After Meriweather was placed on injured reserve, Gomes was made the starting strong safety again in the Week 12 win against the Dallas Cowboys, where he recovered a fumble after Josh Wilson stripped the ball and recorded six tackles.

Gomes was waived during the final roster cuts before the start of the 2013 season on August 31, 2013.

=== Detroit Lions ===
Gomes was claimed off waivers by the Detroit Lions on September 1, 2013.

On August 26, 2014, the Lions placed Gomes on injured reserve due to a neck and shoulder injury he suffered in the second preseason game against the Oakland Raiders when he took on a helmet-to-helmet collision with Raiders tight end Scott Simonson. Three days later, the Lions released him off injured reserve with an injury settlement.
