= Pierre Allen =

American football player (born 1987)

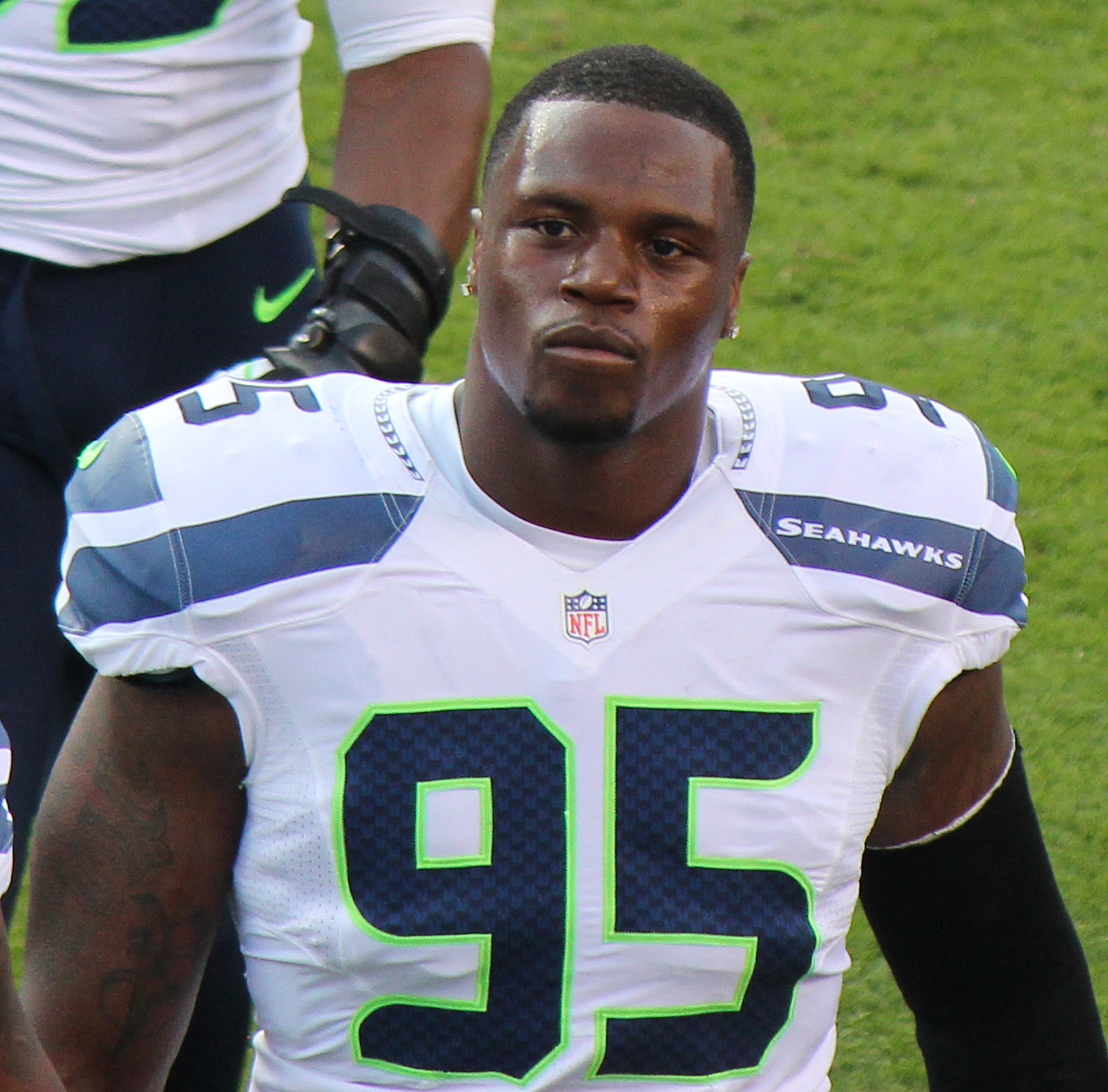
- Allen with the Seattle Seahawks in 2012

No. 95, 96
- Position: Defensive end

Personal information
- Born: November 18, 1987 (age 38); Denver, Colorado, U.S.
- Listed height: 6 ft 5 in (1.96 m)
- Listed weight: 265 lb (120 kg)

Career information
- College: Nebraska
- NFL draft: 2011: undrafted

Career history
- Seattle Seahawks (2011–2012)*
- * Offseason or practice squad member only

Awards and highlights
- First-team All-Big 12 (2010)
- Stats at Pro Football Reference

Pierre Allen (born November 18, 1987) is an American former football defensive end.

== College career ==
He played college football at Nebraska. While playing at Nebraska, Allen was selected as a first-team All-Big 12 player and was the captain of the 2010 Nebraska Cornhuskers football team. He was also on the watch lists for the Lombardi Award and the Ted Hendricks Award.

== Professional career ==
Allen was signed by the Seattle Seahawks as an undrafted free agent following the end of the NFL lockout on July 26, 2011. He was injured/released on September 3, 2011, and then re-signed to Seattle Seahawks practice squad on November 9, 2011.

Allen played for the Seahawks throughout the 2012 preseason. He was waived on August 31, 2012, as part of the final cuts to the 53-man roster. He was not among the seven players signed to the Seahawks' practice squad.
