= D. J. Jones (offensive lineman) =

American football player (born 1988)

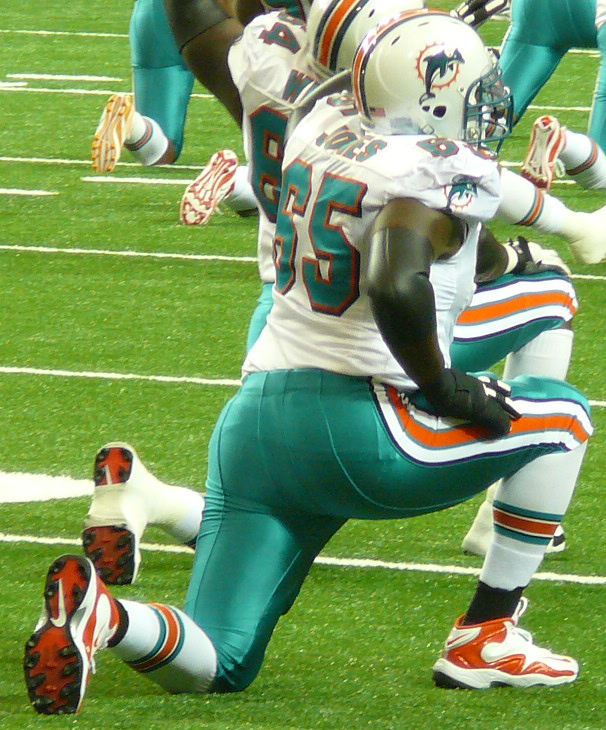
- Jones with the Dolphins in 2011.

No. 71, 65
- Position: Offensive tackle

Personal information
- Born: May 8, 1988 (age 38); Kansas City, Missouri
- Listed height: 6 ft 5 in (1.96 m)
- Listed weight: 310 lb (141 kg)

Career information
- College: Nebraska
- NFL draft: 2011: undrafted

Career history
- Miami Dolphins (2011)*; Baltimore Ravens (2011); Philadelphia Eagles (2012)*
- * Offseason or practice squad member only
- Stats at Pro Football Reference

David Vernon "D. J." Jones II, (born May 8, 1988) is an American former football offensive tackle. He was signed by the Miami Dolphins as an undrafted free agent in 2011 after a college football career with the Nebraska Cornhuskers. He spent portions of the 2011 season on the Dolphins' and Baltimore Ravens' practice squads. He was on the Ravens' active roster before he was waived in the postseason. The Eagles claimed him off waivers on February 6, 2012. He was waived by the Eagles on August 31, 2012, and claimed by the Giants on September 1, 2012. The Giants negated the claim on September 2, 2012, after Jones failed his physical.

Pre-draft measurables
Height	Weight	40-yard dash	10-yard split	20-yard split	20-yard shuttle	Three-cone drill	Vertical jump	Broad jump	Bench press
6 ft 5 3/8 in (1.97 m)	310 lb (141 kg)	4.92 s	1.75 s	2.86 s	4.83 s	7.50 s	26.0 in (0.66 m)	8 ft 2 in (2.49 m)	19 reps
All values from Pro Day
