= Barry Turner (American football) =

American football player (born 1987)

No. 62
- Position: Defensive end

Personal information
- Born: January 7, 1987 (age 39); Nashville, Tennessee, U.S.
- Listed height: 6 ft 3 in (1.91 m)
- Listed weight: 265 lb (120 kg)

Career information
- High school: Brentwood Academy (Brentwood, Tennessee)
- College: Nebraska
- NFL draft: 2010: undrafted

Career history
- Chicago Bears (2010); Detroit Lions (2010)

Career NFL statistics
- Total tackles: 1
- Stats at Pro Football Reference

Barry Turner (born January 7, 1987) is an American former professional football player who was a defensive end in the National Football League (NFL). He was signed by the Chicago Bears as an undrafted free agent in 2010. He played college football for the Nebraska Cornhuskers.

== Professional career ==
=== Chicago Bears ===
Turner was signed by the Chicago Bears as an undrafted free agent following the 2010 NFL draft on April 25, 2010. He was waived during final roster cuts on September 4, but was re-signed to the team's practice squad on September 5. He was promoted to the active roster on October 19. He played in two games for the Bears before he was waived on December 7 to make room for offensive lineman Herman Johnson.

=== Detroit Lions ===
Turner was claimed off waivers by the Detroit Lions on December 8, 2010.
