= Jared Crick =

American football player (born 1989)

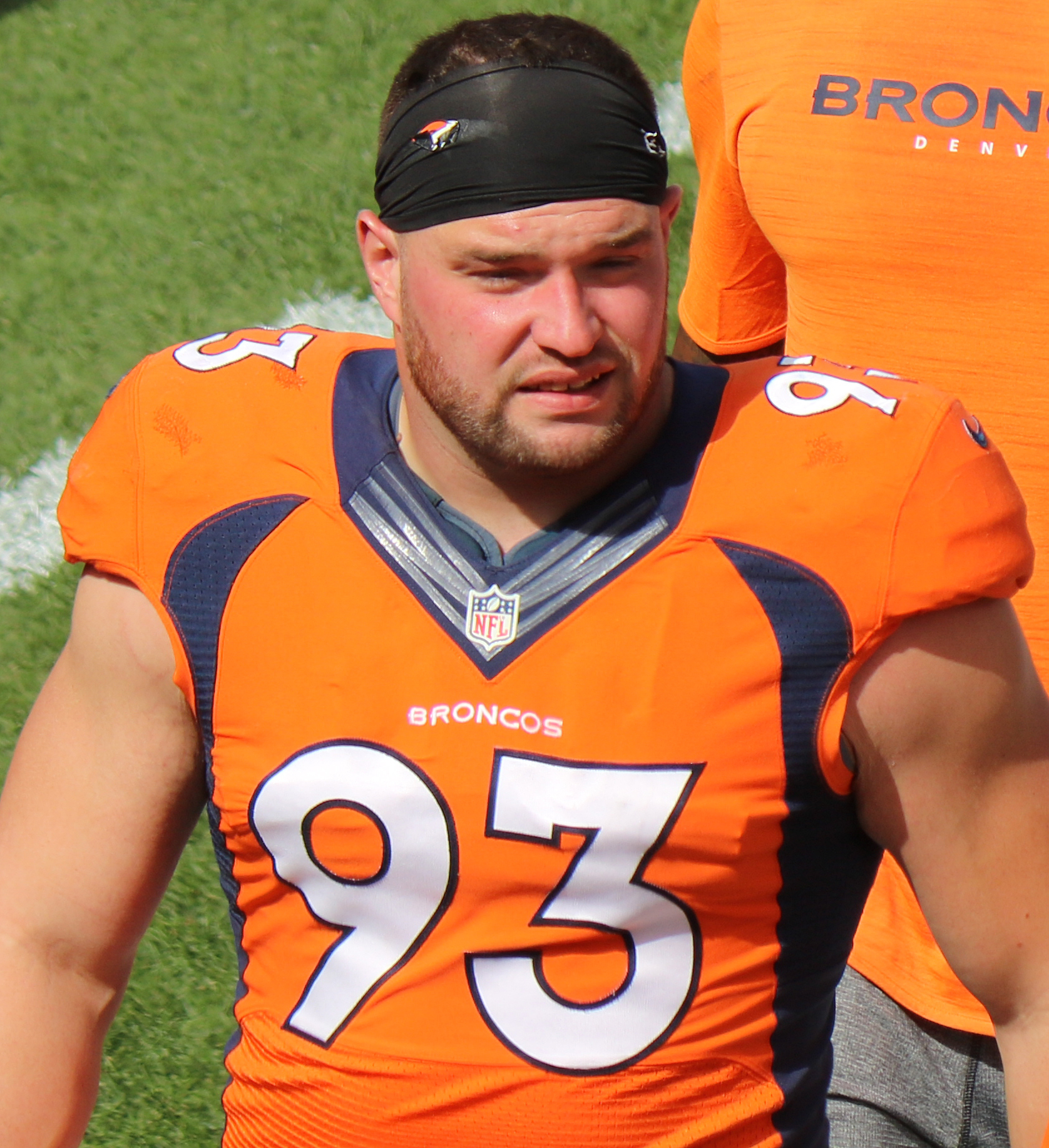
- Crick with the Denver Broncos in 2016

No. 93
- Position: Defensive end

Personal information
- Born: August 21, 1989 (age 37); Albuquerque, New Mexico, U.S.
- Listed height: 6 ft 4 in (1.93 m)
- Listed weight: 285 lb (129 kg)

Career information
- High school: Cozad (Cozad, Nebraska)
- College: Nebraska
- NFL draft: 2012: 4th round, 126th overall pick

Career history
- Houston Texans (2012–2015); Denver Broncos (2016–2017)

Awards and highlights
- Second-team All-American (2010); 2× First-team All-Big 12 (2009, 2010)

Career NFL statistics
- Total tackles: 199
- Sacks: 8.5
- Forced fumbles: 3
- Fumble recoveries: 2
- Stats at Pro Football Reference

Jared Verlon Crick (born August 21, 1989) is an American former professional football player who was a defensive end in the National Football League (NFL). He played college football for the Nebraska Cornhuskers before being selected by the Houston Texans in the fourth round of the 2012 NFL draft.

== College career ==
After being redshirted as a freshman in 2007, Crick played in nine games as a redshirt freshman in 2008, recording two tackles.

As a sophomore in 2009, Crick recorded 75 tackles and nine and a half sacks. As a junior in 2010, he recorded 9 and a half sacks with 70 tackles. He was then awarded postseason 2nd Team All-American. As a senior, his season was shortened by a torn pectoral muscle and he entered the NFL Draft. He finished his career with a total of 20 sacks, putting him 8th on Nebraska's all-time list.

== Professional career ==
Pre-draft measurables
Height	Weight	Arm length	Hand span	40-yard dash	10-yard split	20-yard split	20-yard shuttle	Three-cone drill	Vertical jump	Broad jump	Bench press
6 ft 4 1/4 in (1.94 m)	279 lb (127 kg)	32 in (0.81 m)	10 1/8 in (0.26 m)	4.99 s	1.79 s	2.85 s	4.40 s	7.47 s	31 in (0.79 m)	8 ft 8 in (2.64 m)	26 reps
All values from NFL Combine/Pro Day

=== Houston Texans ===
Crick was selected by the Houston Texans in the fourth round of the 2012 NFL draft with the 126th overall pick.

After being in a reserved role in 2012 and 2013, Crick emerged as a starter in 2014 and 2015, starting 31 of 32 games played.

=== Denver Broncos ===
On April 6, 2016, Crick signed a two-year contract with the Denver Broncos.

On September 15, 2017, Crick was placed on injured reserve after having back surgery.
