= Eric Martin (linebacker) =

American football player (born 1991)

No. 93, 56, 52, 53
- Position: Defensive end

Personal information
- Born: July 21, 1991 (age 35); Moreno Valley, California, U.S.
- Listed height: 6 ft 2 in (1.88 m)
- Listed weight: 250 lb (113 kg)

Career information
- High school: Rancho Verde (Moreno Valley)
- College: Nebraska
- NFL draft: 2013: undrafted

Career history
- New Orleans Saints (2013)*; Cleveland Browns (2013–2014); New England Patriots (2014–2015); Winnipeg Blue Bombers (2016); Toronto Argonauts (2016)
- * Offseason or practice squad member only

Awards and highlights
- Super Bowl champion (XLIX); First-team All-Big Ten (2012)

Career NFL statistics
- Total tackles: 17
- Forced fumbles: 2
- Fumble recoveries: 2
- Stats at Pro Football Reference
- Stats at CFL.ca

Eric Martin (born July 21, 1991) is an American former professional football player who was a defensive end in the National Football League (NFL) and Canadian Football League (CFL). He played college football for the Nebraska Cornhuskers.

== Professional career ==
=== New Orleans Saints ===
On April 28, 2013, he signed with the New Orleans Saints as an undrafted free agent.

=== Cleveland Browns ===
On August 28, 2013, he was claimed off waivers by the Cleveland Browns.

=== New England Patriots ===
On December 29, 2014, the New England Patriots signed Martin to their practice squad. Martin won Super Bowl XLIX with the Patriots after they defeated the defending champion Seattle Seahawks 28–24. Martin made the 2015 53-man roster out of camp, but on September 12, 2015, the Patriots waived Martin. They re-signed him to their practice squad on October 1, 2015.

On November 12, 2015, he was promoted to the active roster. On November 27, he was waived. Martin was re-signed to the Patriots' practice squad on December 9, 2015, then promoted to the active roster three days later.

On December 19, 2015, it was announced Martin was waived from the Patriots roster with an injury designation to make room for fullback Joey Iosefa. Martin cleared waivers and reverted to injured reserve on December 21, 2015.

Martin was waived by the Patriots on April 14, 2016.

=== Winnipeg Blue Bombers ===
Martin played in one game for the Winnipeg Blue Bombers of the Canadian Football League (CFL) during the 2016 season.

=== Toronto Argonauts ===
On October 3, 2016, Martin signed with the Toronto Argonauts of the CFL. He played in four games for the Argonauts in 2016.
