= Keith Williams (offensive lineman) =

American football player (born 1988)

No. 68
- Position: Offensive guard

Personal information
- Born: April 8, 1988 (age 38); Florissant, Missouri, U.S.
- Listed height: 6 ft 4 in (1.93 m)
- Listed weight: 312 lb (142 kg)

Career information
- High school: McCluer North (Florissant)
- College: Nebraska
- NFL draft: 2011: 6th round, 196th overall pick

Career history

Playing
- Pittsburgh Steelers (2011)*; Buffalo Bills (2011−2013); Arizona Rattlers (2014–2016); Cleveland Gladiators (2017)*
- * Offseason or practice squad member only

Coaching
- Missouri Baptist (2017) Offensive Line Coach; Missouri Baptist (2018-2019) Offensive Line Coach/Offensive Coordinator; Bethel University (Tennessee) (2020-2021) Assistant Head Coach/Offensive Coordinator; Nebraska (2022–present) Senior Director of Player Personnel & Recruiting

Awards and highlights
- ArenaBowl champion (2014)

Career NFL statistics
- Games played: 2
- Stats at Pro Football Reference

Keith Phillip Williams (born April 8, 1988), is an American former professional football player who was an offensive guard in the National Football League (NFL). He was selected by the Pittsburgh Steelers in the sixth round of the 2011 NFL draft. He played college football for the Nebraska Cornhuskers.

== Early life ==
Williams attended McCluer North High School, playing both offensive and defensive tackle. In his senior year, he recorded 24 tackles, one sack, and one fumble recovery while leading his team to its second consecutive state championship appearance. He earned all-state honors both on offense and defense, and was named in the top 15 of Rivals.com recruits in Missouri. He chose to attend the University of Nebraska–Lincoln in 2006.

== College career ==
Earning a starting role in his sophomore year after being redshirted in 2006, Williams became a consistent performer on the starting offensive line. He helped pave the way for a strong rushing attack, with Nebraska leading the Big 12 in rushing yards, and allowed three players to run for over 900 yards each. Williams earned 34 starts in his career at Nebraska, the most of any player in Nebraska's offense. He was named to Rivals.com's second-team All-Big 12, Phil Steele's third-team All-Big 12, and also earned positions in the Honorable-Mention All-Big 12 team of the Associated Press and Coaches teams.

== Professional career ==
Pre-draft measurables
Height	Weight	Arm length	Hand span	Wingspan	40-yard dash	10-yard split	20-yard split	20-yard shuttle	Three-cone drill	Vertical jump	Broad jump	Bench press
6 ft 4 1/4 in (1.94 m)	318 lb (144 kg)	32 3/8 in (0.82 m)	10 in (0.25 m)	6 ft 6 3/8 in (1.99 m)	5.36 s	1.89 s	3.11 s	5.03 s	8.42 s	24.5 in (0.62 m)	7 ft 9 in (2.36 m)	23 reps
All values from NFL Combine

=== Pittsburgh Steelers ===
Williams was selected 196th overall in the sixth round by the Pittsburgh Steelers. He was released by the Steelers on September 2, 2011.

=== Buffalo Bills ===
Williams was signed to the Bills practice squad on September 20, 2011. On August 20, 2013, he was waived / injured by the Bills. On August 21, 2013, he cleared waivers and was placed on the Bills' injured reserve list. On August 26, 2013, he was waived with an injury settlement.

=== Arizona Rattlers ===
On February 17, 2014, Williams was assigned to the Arizona Rattlers of the Arena Football League (AFL).

=== Cleveland Gladiators ===
On January 31, 2017, Williams was assigned to the Cleveland Gladiators. He was placed on reassignment on March 9, 2017.
