= 2009 Big 12 Championship Game =

2009 Dr Pepper Big 12 Championship Game
- Conference Championship
Texas Longhorns	Nebraska Cornhuskers
(12–0)	(9–3)
13	12
Head coach: Mack Brown	Head coach: Bo Pelini
AP / Coaches / BCS; 3 / 2 / 3	AP / Coaches / BCS; 21 / 20 / 22
	1	2	3	4	Total
Texas	0	7	3	3	13
Nebraska	6	0	0	6	12
- Date: December 5, 2009
- Season: 2009
- Stadium: Cowboys Stadium
- Location: Arlington, Texas
- MVP: Ndamukong Suh (DT Nebraska)
- Referee: Tom Walker
- Attendance: 76,211

United States TV coverage
- Network: ABC
- Announcers: Brent Musburger, Kirk Herbstreit, and Lisa Salters
- Nielsen ratings: 12,693,000 viewers

2009 Big 12 Conference football standings
	Conf.			Overall
Team	W		L	W		L
North Division
No. 14 Nebraska x	6	–	2	10	–	4
Missouri	4	–	4	8	–	5
Kansas State	4	–	4	6	–	6
Iowa State	3	–	5	7	–	6
Colorado	2	–	6	3	–	9
Kansas	1	–	7	5	–	7
South Division
No. 2 Texas x$	8	–	0	13	–	1
Oklahoma State	6	–	2	9	–	4
No. 21 Texas Tech	5	–	3	9	–	4
Oklahoma	5	–	3	8	–	5
Texas A&M	3	–	5	6	–	7
Baylor	1	–	7	4	–	8
Championship: Texas 13, Nebraska 12
$ – BCS representative as conference champion; x – Division champion/co-champions; Rankings from AP Poll

The 2009 Dr Pepper Big 12 Championship Game was held on December 5, 2009, at Cowboys Stadium in Arlington, Texas. The divisional winners from the Big 12 Conference squared off in the 14th edition of the game. The Texas Longhorns represented the South Division and the Nebraska Cornhuskers represented the North. Texas won 13–12 on a last second field goal by placekicker Hunter Lawrence.

On the play immediately prior to Lawrence's field goal, as the game clock ticked down Texas quarterback Colt McCoy rolled far to the right, with Nebraska's Ndamukong Suh in hot pursuit, and threw a pass well downfield and out of bounds. The game clock ran out, which would have ended the game, with Nebraska appearing to win 12–10. However, pursuant to Rule 12–3–6, the video replay official determined that an "egregious", and therefore reviewable, error concerning the game clock had occurred and ordered the errantly elapsed one second be returned to the clock. The ESPN/ABC video feed showed that McCoy's pass hit a stadium railing out of bounds with :01 left, allowing Texas to kick the winning field goal to advance to the BCS title game. This controversy has led to the game being called by some followers as One Second Left. After the game, Nebraska coach Bo Pelini said that the 1 second rule was part of a BCS conspiracy. The game was the third and final championship tilt between the Cornhuskers and Longhorns. Unranked Texas upset #3 Nebraska 37–27 in 1996 in St. Louis, Missouri, while #2 Nebraska beat #12 Texas 22–6 in 1999 in San Antonio, Texas. Texas is now 3–2 in the conference title games; Nebraska fell to 2–3. Texas went to second in Big 12 Championship titles to Oklahoma, who owned 14 conference titles at the time. This was the last conference title win for Texas until the 2023 edition of the championship.

Per Big 12 policy, Nebraska was declared the home team because the game took place in a home state of four Big 12 South teams. Designated "home" teams are 9–5 in Big 12 Championship Games. The South Division had won six years in a row and were 10–4 overall.

== Selection process ==
The Big 12 Championship Game matched up the winner of the North and South divisions of the Big 12 Conference. The game was first played in 1996, when the conference was assembled to include all of the teams from the Big Eight Conference as well as four teams that had formerly been members of the Southwest Conference. The championship game was modeled on the SEC format, which was the first conference in college football to have a conference championship game.
