= Mike McNeill (American football) =

American football player (born 1988)

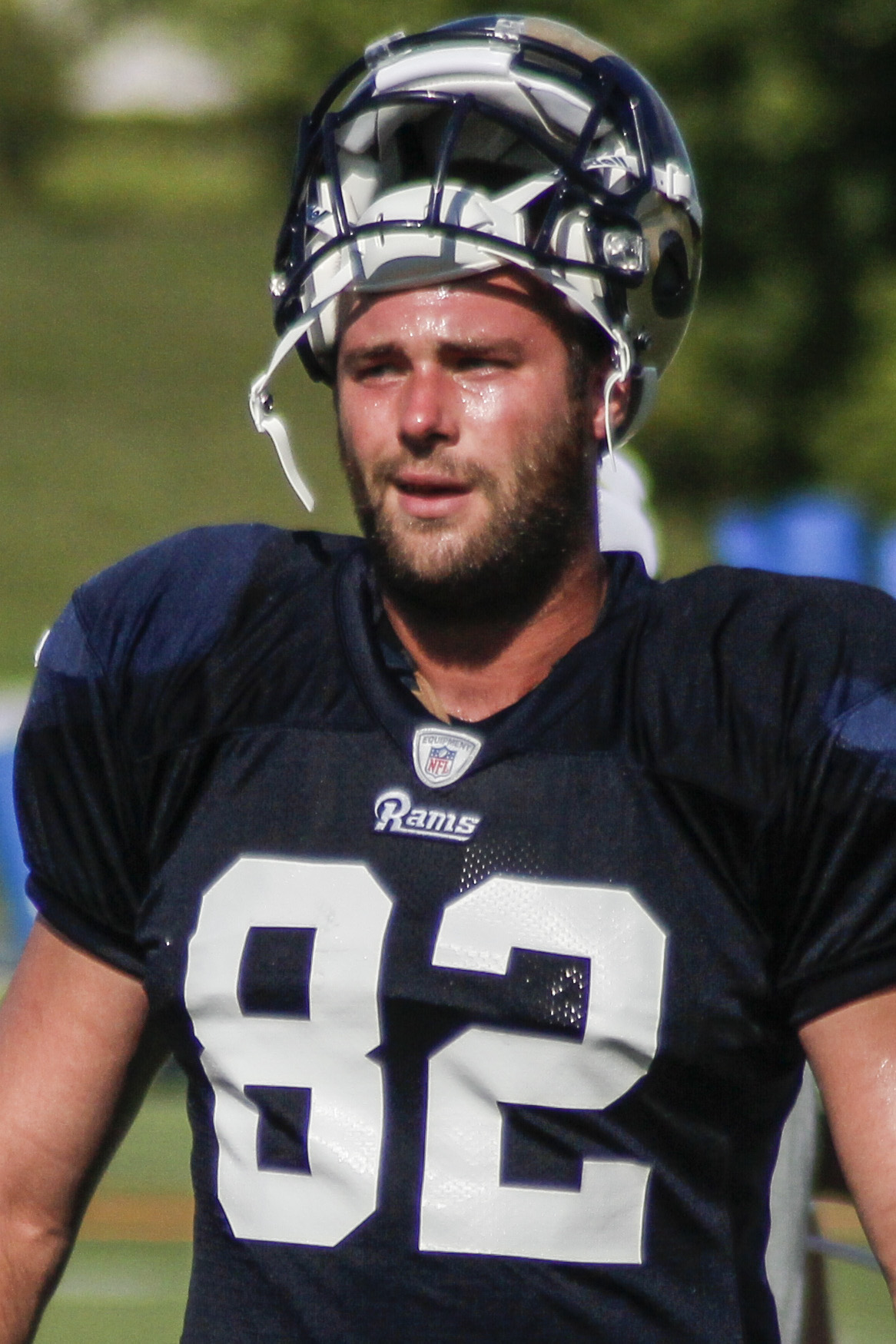
- McNeill

No. 80, 89, 82
- Position: Tight end

Personal information
- Born: March 7, 1988 (age 38); St. Louis, Missouri, U.S.
- Listed height: 6 ft 4 in (1.93 m)
- Listed weight: 232 lb (105 kg)

Career information
- High school: Kirkwood (Kirkwood, Missouri)
- College: Nebraska
- NFL draft: 2011: undrafted

Career history
- Indianapolis Colts (2011); St. Louis Rams (2011–2013); Carolina Panthers (2014)*
- * Offseason or practice squad member only

Career NFL statistics
- Receptions: 5
- Receiving yards: 36
- Stats at Pro Football Reference

Mike McNeill (born March 7, 1988) is an American former professional football player who was a tight end in the National Football League (NFL). Prior to the Carolina Panthers. McNeill played as tight end for his hometown team, the St. Louis Rams from 2011 to 2014. He was signed by the Indianapolis Colts as an undrafted free agent in 2011 after playing college football for the Nebraska Cornhuskers.

== Early life ==
McNeill was born in St. Louis, Missouri, and attended Kirkwood High School in Kirkwood, Missouri from 2002 to 2006, where he was a letterman in football and basketball. He was a captain of the KHS football squad, playing defensive end and tight end alongside Jeremy Maclin who currently plays wide receiver for the Philadelphia Eagles. McNeill was a three-year starter for the football team and a significant contributor to the 2005 semi-finalist squad. That same year, he also led the basketball team to a third-place finish in the state championship. McNeill was a captain of the KHS football squad, playing defensive end and tight end. He has 1,833 career all-purpose yards with 97 career receptions totaling 1,816 yards with an 18.72 average. He was ranked among the top 40 prospects at tight end nationally and among the top dozen players in the state of Missouri. He was one of two signees from the state of Missouri in 2006 and chose Nebraska over several other offers.

== College career ==
McNeill attended University of Nebraska-Lincoln from 2006-2010. As a sophomore, McNeill burst onto the scene, catching a Nebraska tight end record 32 passes for 442 yards and six touchdowns. His receptions total bettered the 31 catches by Johnny Mitchell in 1991, and his six touchdowns were just one shy of Mitchell's season tight end record. McNeill was one of seven Huskers who caught at least 20 passes, helping Nebraska finish 14th nationally in passing offense and 12th in total offense. After setting the single-season position reception record in 2008, McNeill claimed the career tight end reception record and closed his career with 82 career catches to rank in a tie for ninth in school history. He also became the 19th Husker to record 1,000 career receiving yards.

Honors & Awards -Second-team All-Big 12 (2009, AP) -Honorable-Mention All-Big 12 (2009, Coaches) -Nebraska Career Record Holder for Receptions by a Tight End (82) -Nebraska Season Record Holder for Receptions by a Tight End (32 in 2008) -Big 12 Commissioner's Fall Academic Honor Roll (2006, 2010)

== Professional career ==
=== Indianapolis Colts ===
After going undrafted in the 2011 NFL draft, McNeill signed as a free agent with the Indianapolis Colts on July 29, 2011.

=== St. Louis Rams ===
On December 20, 2011, McNeill signed with the St. Louis Rams.

=== Carolina Panthers ===
On March 14, 2014, McNeill signed with the Carolina Panthers. On March 16, 2015, he was released by the Panthers.
