= Niles Paul =

American football player (born 1989)

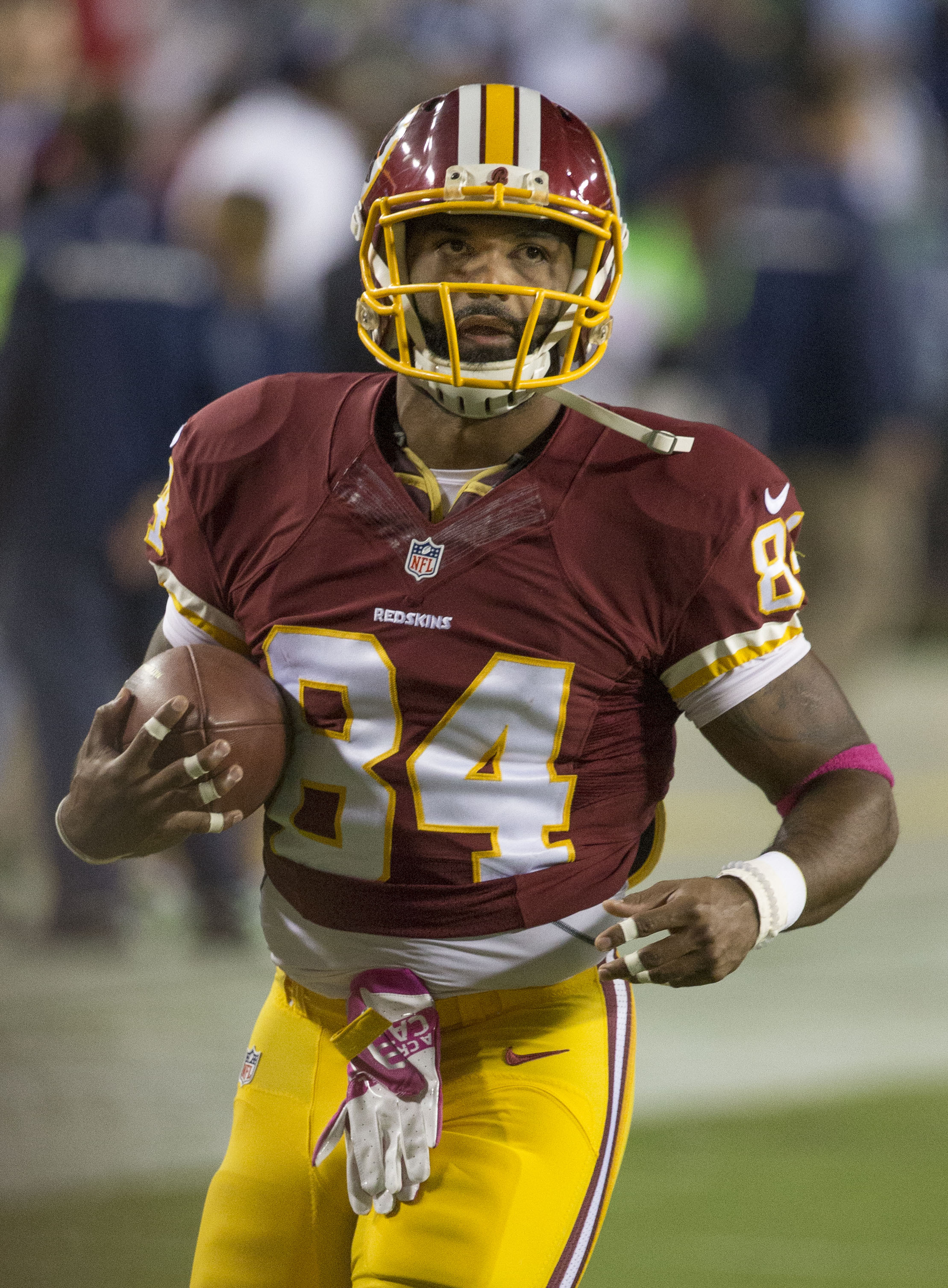
- Paul with the Washington Redskins in 2014

No. 84, 81
- Position: Tight end

Personal information
- Born: August 9, 1989 (age 37); Omaha, Nebraska, U.S.
- Listed height: 6 ft 1 in (1.85 m)
- Listed weight: 242 lb (110 kg)

Career information
- High school: Omaha North
- College: Nebraska (2007–2010)
- NFL draft: 2011: 5th round, 155th overall pick

Career history
- Washington Redskins (2011–2017); Jacksonville Jaguars (2018); San Francisco 49ers (2019)*
- * Offseason or practice squad member only

Awards and highlights
- Second-team All-Big 12 (2010)

Career NFL statistics
- Receptions: 78
- Receiving yards: 954
- Return yards: 814
- Total touchdowns: 2
- Stats at Pro Football Reference

Niles Paul (born August 9, 1989) is an American former professional football player who was a tight end for eight seasons in the National Football League (NFL). He played college football as a wide receiver for the Nebraska Cornhuskers and was selected in the fifth round of the 2011 NFL draft by the Washington Redskins.

== Early life ==
Paul attended Omaha North High School in Omaha, Nebraska, where he was a three-sport star in football, track, and basketball. In football, Paul helped North to a 9–2 record and a trip to the Class A state quarterfinals. He was named a first-team All-Nebraska and first-team All-Metro selection by the Omaha World-Herald and a first-team Super-State pick by the Lincoln Journal Star. He was also one of 58 players who were selected as a Parade All-American. Paul averaged 19.5 yards on 32 receptions and caught 10 touchdown passes as a junior, and also averaged 25.6 yards per kickoff return. As a senior, Paul hauled in 46 passes for 814 yards and 13 touchdowns for Coach Larry Martin. He averaged nearly 18 yards per reception, and also averaged better than 18 yards per punt return. Paul was invited to play at the U.S. Army All-American Game in San Antonio, Texas, and he led the West team in receiving yards.

In track & field, Paul won the 110-meter hurdles at the state meet as both a junior (14.71s) and a senior (14.33s), while finishing second in the 300-meter hurdles (38.34s) and fourth in the 100-meter dash (11.00s) as a senior. His 4x100-meter relay team also finished second with a time of 42.30 seconds. In 2006, he led the Vikings to the Class A state track title by winning four gold medals. Individually, he captured the Class A titles in the 110m hurdles and 300m hurdles and was part of the all-class gold medal teams in the 4 × 100 m (42.31) and 4x400-meter (3:18.80) relays. On the basketball court, Paul was among the Class A leaders in scoring and rebounding, averaging nearly 19 points and 12 rebounds per game as a senior.

Paul was regarded as the top prospect in the state of Nebraska in 2007, and was NU's first signee from Omaha North since 1998. He was regarded as one of the top 20 receiving prospects in the country by both Rivals.com and Scout.com.

== College career ==
Paul played football at the University of Nebraska–Lincoln for the Cornhuskers from 2007 to 2010. He finished his college career with 103 receptions for 1,532 yards and 5 touchdowns. His career total of 4,122 all-purpose yards ranks fifth all-time in Nebraska history.

== Professional career ==
Pre-draft measurables
| Height | Weight | Arm length | Hand span | Wingspan | 40-yard dash | 10-yard split | 20-yard split | 20-yard shuttle | Three-cone drill | Vertical jump | Broad jump | Bench press |
|---|---|---|---|---|---|---|---|---|---|---|---|---|
| 6 ft 0 7/8 in (1.85 m) | 224 lb (102 kg) | 31 in (0.79 m) | 8 7/8 in (0.23 m) | 6 ft 2 3/8 in (1.89 m) | 4.46 s | 1.49 s | 2.56 s | 4.14 s | 6.90 s | 34.5 in (0.88 m) | 9 ft 9 in (2.97 m) | 24 reps |
All values from NFL Combine, except 40 time from Pro Day

=== Washington Redskins ===
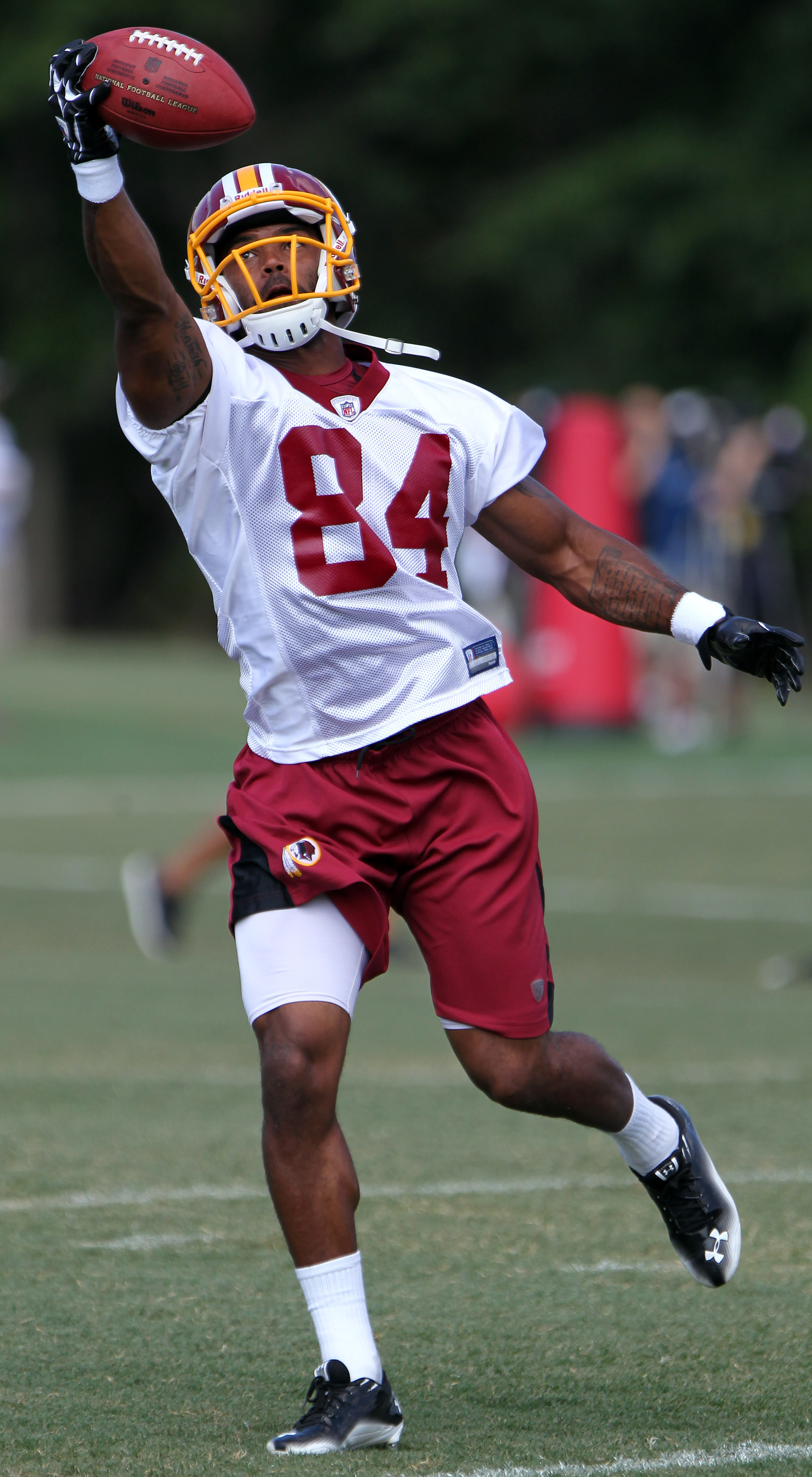
Paul with the Redskins in 2011

==== 2011 season ====
The Washington Redskins selected Paul in the fifth round (155th overall) of the 2011 NFL draft. He was signed to a four-year contract on July 29, 2011. Paul made his NFL debut in Week 1 against the New York Giants. In Week 3 against the St. Louis Rams, he made an impressive hit on Austin Pettis during a punt return that caused him to lose the ball, but Paul was penalized for an illegal tackle. On October 5, 2011, Paul was fined $20,000 for a helmet-to-helmet hit on Pettis. In Week 7 against the Carolina Panthers, Paul had his first career start as well as made his first two career catches. Contributing more to special teams, Paul played a total of 13 games, starting in two of them, and recorded two catches for 25 yards by the end of 2011 season.

==== 2012 season ====
On April 20, 2012, it was reported that Paul had been attending the team's tight end meetings and would be switching from wide receiver to tight end. During the offseason some of the Redskins' staff, including coach Mike Shanahan and teammate Darrel Young, compared him to former tight end, Shannon Sharpe. In the Week 12 win against the Dallas Cowboys on Thanksgiving, Paul scored his first career touchdown.

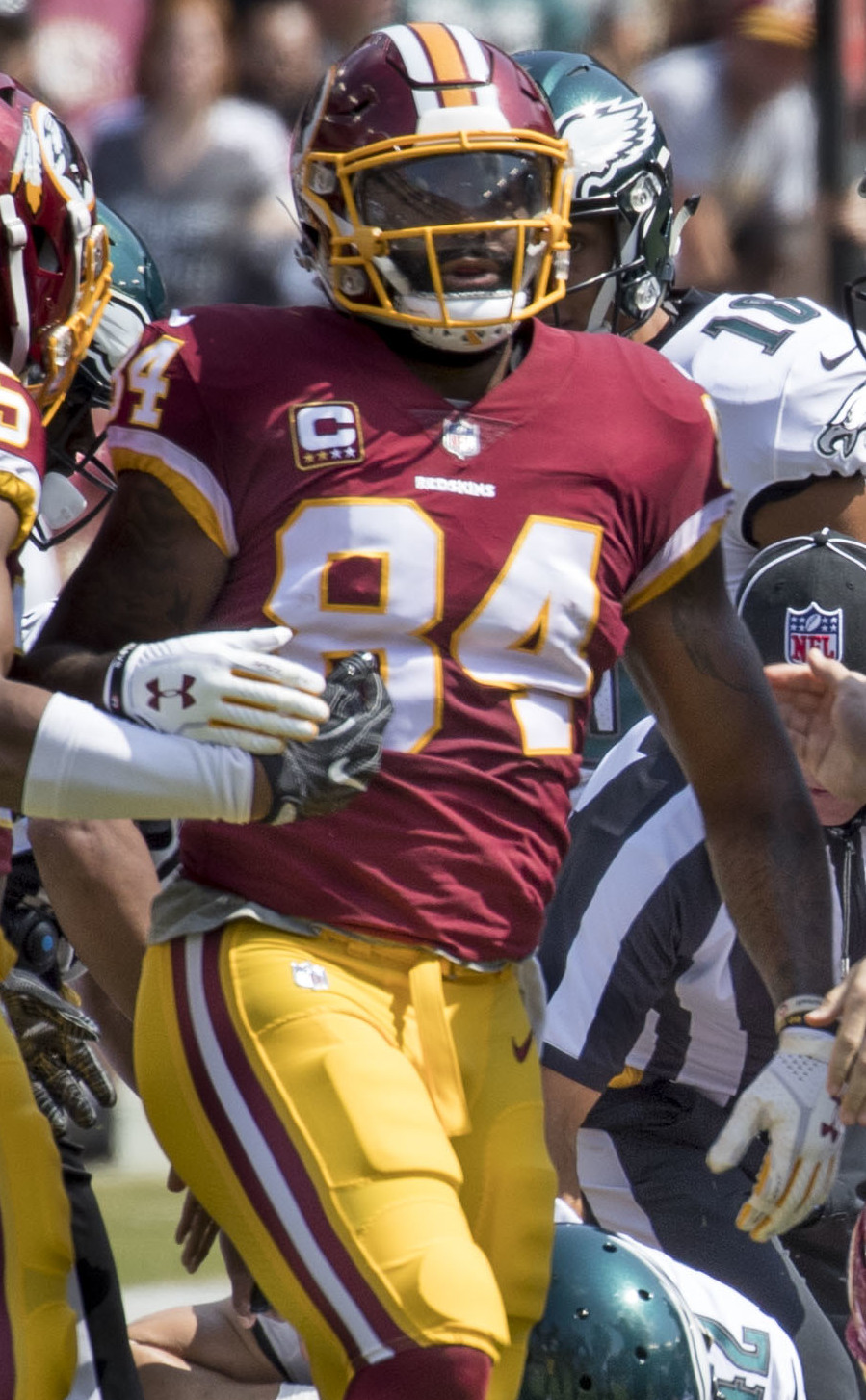
Paul in 2017

==== 2013 season ====
During the 2013 offseason, Paul was trained to be the backup fullback behind starter Darrel Young. He would get his first start at fullback in Week 12 against the San Francisco 49ers due to Young being inactive because of injury.

==== 2014 season ====
During the 2014 season, Paul took over at tight end after Jordan Reed was injured in Week 1. Paul made a name for himself by accumulating 21 catches for 313 yards and 1 touchdown prior to suffering a helmet-to-helmet hit in a Week 4 Thursday Night Football game by New York Giants defensive back Quentin Demps. Immediately after impact, Paul displayed the classic fencing response, a symptom of a serious concussion.

==== 2015 season ====
On March 6, 2015, the Redskins re-signed Paul to a three-year, $10 million contract. Paul suffered a season-ending ankle fracture dislocation during the first preseason game against the Cleveland Browns. On August 16, 2015, the Redskins placed him on injured reserve.

==== 2016 season ====
On November 8, 2016, Paul was placed on injured reserve after suffering a knee injury in Week 8 against the Cincinnati Bengals.

=== Jacksonville Jaguars ===
On March 15, 2018, Paul signed a two-year contract with the Jacksonville Jaguars. He was placed on injured reserve on October 16, 2018, with a knee injury. He was released on December 14, 2018.

=== San Francisco 49ers ===
On July 26, 2019, Paul signed a one-year contract with the San Francisco 49ers, but was released on August 2, 2019.

=== Retirement ===
On August 6, 2019, Paul announced his retirement.
