= 2011 Oklahoma Sooners football team =

American college football season

2011 Oklahoma Sooners football

Insight Bowl champion

Insight Bowl, W 31–14 vs. Iowa
- Conference: Big 12 Conference

Ranking
- Coaches: No. 15
- AP: No. 16
- Record: 10–3 (6–3 Big 12)
- Head coach: Bob Stoops (13th season)
- Co-offensive coordinators: Josh Heupel (1st season); Jay Norvell (1st season)
- Offensive scheme: No-huddle spread
- Defensive coordinator: Brent Venables (13th season)
- Base defense: 4–3
- Captains: Ryan Broyles; Ben Habern; Landry Jones; Travis Lewis; Tress Way
- Home stadium: Gaylord Family Oklahoma Memorial Stadium

2011 Big 12 Conference football standings
	Conf.			Overall
Team	W		L	W		L
No. 3 Oklahoma State $	8	–	1	12	–	1
No. 15 Kansas State	7	–	2	10	–	3
No. 13 Baylor	6	–	3	10	–	3
No. 16 Oklahoma	6	–	3	10	–	3
Missouri	5	–	4	8	–	5
Texas	4	–	5	8	–	5
Texas A&M	4	–	5	7	–	6
Iowa State	3	–	6	6	–	7
Texas Tech	2	–	7	5	–	7
Kansas	0	–	9	2	–	10
$ – BCS representative as conference champion; Rankings from AP Poll

The 2011 Oklahoma Sooners football team represented the University of Oklahoma in the 2011 NCAA Division I FBS football season, the 117th season of Sooner football. The team was led by two-time Walter Camp Coach of the Year Award winner, Bob Stoops, in his 13th season as head coach. They played their home games at Gaylord Family Oklahoma Memorial Stadium in Norman, Oklahoma. They were a charter member of the Big 12 Conference.

Conference play began with a win at home over the Missouri Tigers on September 24, and concluded with a loss in the annual Bedlam Series to the Oklahoma State Cowboys on December 3 in Stillwater, Oklahoma. This loss marked the first time OSU had beaten Oklahoma in nine years, the last time coming in 2002. The Sooners finished the regular season with a 9–3 record (6–3 record in the Big 12), finishing in a tie with Baylor for third place in the conference. They were invited to the Insight Bowl, where they defeated Iowa, 31–14.

Following the season, Ryan Broyles was selected in the 2nd round of the 2012 NFL draft, Donald Stephenson and Jamell Fleming in the 3rd, Frank Alexander and Ronnell Lewis in the 4th, James Hanna in the 6th, and Travis Lewis in the 7th. This total number of seven ties with the total following the 2009 season as the second-most Sooners selected in the NFL draft in the 16 years of the Stoops era, placing behind the mark of 11 following the 2004 season.

== Recruits ==
College recruiting
Name	Hometown	School	Height	Weight	40^{‡}	Commit date
Marquis Anderson; DT	Cibolo, TX	Steele HS	6 ft 3 in (1.91 m)	280 lb (130 kg)	N/A	May 6, 2010
Marquis Anderson; DT	Recruit ratings: Scout: Rivals: (80)					
Dylan Dismuke; OL	Duncan, OK	Duncan HS	6 ft 6 in (1.98 m)	292 lb (132 kg)	N/A	Jun 8, 2010
Dylan Dismuke; OL	Recruit ratings: Scout: Rivals: (78)					
Derek Farniok; OL	Sioux Falls, SD	Washington HS	6 ft 9 in (2.06 m)	319 lb (145 kg)	N/A	Jun 10, 2010
Derek Farniok; OL	Recruit ratings: Scout: Rivals: (78)					
Nathan Hughes; DE	Klein, TX	Klein Oak HS	6 ft 6 in (1.98 m)	263 lb (119 kg)	4.7	May 2, 2010
Nathan Hughes; DE	Recruit ratings: Scout: Rivals: (81)					
Kameel Jackson; WR	Arlington, TX	Sam Houston HS	6 ft 0 in (1.83 m)	198 lb (90 kg)	4.5	Oct 3, 2009
Kameel Jackson; WR	Recruit ratings: Scout: Rivals: (79)					
Nila Kasitati; OL	Euless, TX	Trinity HS	6 ft 4 in (1.93 m)	280 lb (130 kg)	N/A	Feb 2, 2011
Nila Kasitati; OL	Recruit ratings: Scout: Rivals: (77)					
P. L. Lindley; LB	Round Rock, TX	Stony Point HS	6 ft 2 in (1.88 m)	225 lb (102 kg)	4.5	Feb 20, 2010
P. L. Lindley; LB	Recruit ratings: Scout: Rivals: (79)					
Trey Metoyer; WR	Whitehouse, TX	Whitehouse HS	6 ft 2 in (1.88 m)	198 lb (90 kg)	4.51	Mar 12, 2010
Trey Metoyer; WR	Recruit ratings: Scout: Rivals: (81)					
Bennett Okotcha; DB	Coppell, TX	Coppell HS	6 ft 0 in (1.83 m)	175 lb (79 kg)	4.55	Feb 2, 2011
Bennett Okotcha; DB	Recruit ratings: Scout: Rivals: (76)					
Jordan Phillips; DT	Towanda, KS	Circle HS	6 ft 6 in (1.98 m)	290 lb (130 kg)	4.8	Jun 21, 2010
Jordan Phillips; DT	Recruit ratings: Scout: Rivals: (80)					
Franklin Shannon; LB	Dallas, TX	Skyline HS	6 ft 2 in (1.88 m)	210 lb (95 kg)	4.57	May 28, 2010
Franklin Shannon; LB	Recruit ratings: Scout: Rivals: (77)					
Max Stevenson; TE	Klein, TX	Klein Oak HS	6 ft 6 in (1.98 m)	240 lb (110 kg)	4.6	May 2, 2010
Max Stevenson; TE	Recruit ratings: Scout: Rivals: (79)					
Dan Tapko; TE	Kansas City, MO	Rockhurst HS	6 ft 4 in (1.93 m)	220 lb (100 kg)	N/A	Jun 29, 2010
Dan Tapko; TE	Recruit ratings: Scout: Rivals: (78)					
Kendal Thompson; QB	Moore, OK	Southmoore HS	6 ft 2 in (1.88 m)	180 lb (82 kg)	4.75	Nov 2, 2009
Kendal Thompson; QB	Recruit ratings: Scout: Rivals: (78)					
Jordan Wade; DT	Round Rock, TX	Stony Point HS	6 ft 4 in (1.93 m)	293 lb (133 kg)	N/A	Feb 20, 2010
Jordan Wade; DT	Recruit ratings: Scout: Rivals: (81)					
Brandon Williams; RB	Brookshire, TX	Royal HS	6 ft 1 in (1.85 m)	188 lb (85 kg)	4.47	Apr 19, 2010
Brandon Williams; RB	Recruit ratings: Scout: Rivals: (81)					
Danzel Williams; ATH	Arlington, TX	Martin HS	5 ft 9 in (1.75 m)	190 lb (86 kg)	N/A	Mar 8, 2010
Danzel Williams; ATH	Recruit ratings: Scout: Rivals: (82)					
Overall recruit ranking: Scout: 15 Rivals: 14
‡ Refers to 40-yard dash; Note: In many cases, Scout, Rivals, 247Sports, On3, and ESPN may conflict in their listings of height, weight and 40 time.; In these cases, the average was taken. ESPN grades are on a 100-point scale.; Sources: "Oklahoma 2011 Football Commitments". Rivals.; "2011 Player Commitments – Oklahoma". ESPN.; "2011 Team Ranking". Rivals.com.

== Schedule ==
Date	Time	Opponent	Rank	Site	TV	Result	Attendance
September 3	7:00 p.m.	Tulsa*	No. 1	Gaylord Family Oklahoma Memorial Stadium; Norman, OK	FX	W 47–14	85,260
September 17	7:00 p.m.	at No. 5 Florida State*	No. 1	Doak Campbell Stadium; Tallahassee, FL (College GameDay)	ABC	W 23–13	84,392
September 24	7:00 p.m.	Missouri	No. 1	Gaylord Family Oklahoma Memorial Stadium; Norman, OK (rivalry)	FX	W 38–28	85,547
October 1	6:00 p.m.	Ball State*	No. 2	Gaylord Family Oklahoma Memorial Stadium; Norman, OK	FSN-PPV	W 62–6	84,921
October 8	11:00 a.m.	vs. No. 11 Texas	No. 3	Cotton Bowl; Dallas, TX (Red River Rivalry) (College GameDay)	ABC	W 55–17	96,009
October 15	8:15 p.m.	at Kansas	No. 3	Memorial Stadium; Lawrence, KS	ESPN2	W 47–17	42,580
October 22	7:00 p.m.	Texas Tech^{†}	No. 3	Gaylord Family Oklahoma Memorial Stadium; Norman, OK	ABC/ESPN3	L 38–41	85,204
October 29	2:30 p.m.	at No. 10 Kansas State	No. 11	Bill Snyder Family Football Stadium; Manhattan, KS	ESPN	W 58–17	51,004
November 5	2:30 p.m.	Texas A&M	No. 7	Gaylord Family Oklahoma Memorial Stadium; Norman, OK	ABC/ESPN2	W 41–25	85,709
November 19	7:00 p.m.	at No. 25 Baylor	No. 5	Floyd Casey Stadium; Waco, TX	ABC/ESPN3	L 38–45	40,281
November 26	11:00 a.m.	Iowa State	No. 12	Gaylord Family Oklahoma Memorial Stadium; Norman, OK	FX	W 26–6	84,326
December 3	7:00 p.m.	at No. 3 Oklahoma State	No. 13	Boone Pickens Stadium; Stillwater, OK (Bedlam Series)	ABC	L 10–44	58,141
December 30	7:00 p.m.	vs. Iowa*	No. 12	Sun Devil Stadium; Tempe, AZ (Insight Bowl)	ESPN	W 31–14	54,247
*Non-conference game; ^{†}Homecoming; Rankings from AP Poll released prior to the game; All times are in Central time

== Roster ==
On May 19, 2011, Austin Box, a linebacker finishing his junior year at Oklahoma, was found dead in his home. El Reno Police Chief Ken Brown said officers and medics responded to a call at a house in the town about 30 miles west of Oklahoma City at about 9:25 a.m. concerning an unresponsive male "with unknown medical issues." Brown identified the man as Box and said he first was taken to an El Reno hospital, then transferred by air ambulance to Mercy Hospital in Oklahoma City. Box died a short time later. Sophomore running back Jonathan Miller announced after the season opener against Tulsa that he intended to transfer from Oklahoma. Five days after Miller announced he would be transferring, junior running back Jermie Calhoun announced he would also transfer out. On October 24, sophomore Austin Haywood announced he would also be transferring from Oklahoma at the end of the semester.

2011 Oklahoma Sooners football team roster
Players
Coaches
Offense

Pos.	#	Name	Class
WR	2	Trey Franks	So
RB	3	Brennan Clay	So
WR	4	Kenny Stills	So
QB	6	Ben Sherrard	Jr
WR	9	Ryan Caro	Sr
QB	10	Blake Bell	Fr
QB	11	Kendal Thompson	Fr
QB	12	Landry Jones (C)	Jr
QB	15	Drew Allen	So
WR	16	Jaz Reynolds	So
WR	17	Trey Metoyer	Fr
WR	18	Kameel Jackson	Fr
WR	19	Justin McCay	Fr
RB	22	Roy Finch	So
RB	23	Brandon Williams	Fr
WR	24	Dejuan Miller	Sr
RB	26	Jonathan Miller	So
RB	31	Dominique Whaley (injured)	Jr
FB	32	Marshall Musil	So
FB	33	Trey Millard	So
RB	34	Jermie Calhoun	Jr
FB	36	David Welchert	Fr
RB	37	Danzel Williams	Fr
TE	46	John-Philip Hughes	Fr
TE	47	Trent Ratterree	Sr
FB	48	Aaron Ripkowski	Fr
FB	49	David Driskill	Fr
OL	50	Austin Woods	So
OL	54	Colten Presgrove	Fr
OL	59	Donald Stephenson	Sr
OL	60	Drew Serruto	Jr
OL	61	Ben Habern (C)	Jr
OL	64	Gabe Ikard	So
OL	67	Robert Hollis	Fr
OL	68	Bronson Irwin	So
OL	69	Lane Johnson	Jr
OL	70	Dylan Dismuke	Fr
OL	71	Tyrus Thompson	Fr
OL	72	Derek Farniok	Fr
OL	74	Adam Shead	Fr
OL	75	Tyler Evans	Jr
OL	76	Jarvis Jones	Sr
OL	77	Stephen Good	Sr
OL	78	Jake Reed	So
OL	79	Daryl Williams	Fr
WR	80	Jordan Eagle Road	Fr
WR	81	Nyko Symonds	Fr
WR	82	Tanner Gillette	Fr
TE	82	James Hanna	Sr
TE	84	Nila Kasitati	Fr
WR	85	Ryan Broyles (injured) (C)	Sr
WR	87	Derrick Bradley	Jr
TE	87	Max Stevenson	Fr
WR	88	Sheldon McClain	Fr
TE	89	Austin Haywood	So

Defense

Pos.	#	Name	Class
DB	1	Tony Jefferson	So
DB	2	Julian Wilson	Fr
DB	3	Joe Powell	So
LB	5	Joseph Ibiloye	Jr
DB	6	Demontre Hurst	Jr
LB	7	Corey Nelson	So
DB	8	James Haynes	Fr
DB	9	Gabe Lynn	So
LB	10	Rashod Favors	Fr
LB	13	Londell Taylor	Fr
DB	14	Aaron Colvin	So
DB	15	Lamar Harris	Jr
DB	19	Jesse Bell	Sr
LB	20	Frank Shannon	Fr
LB	21	Tom Wort	So
LB	25	Aaron Franklin	Fr
DB	27	Sam Proctor	Sr
LB	28	Travis Lewis (C)	Sr
DB	29	Quentin Hayes	Fr
DB	30	Javon Harris	Jr
LB	31	Daniel Franklin	Jr
DB	32	Jamell Fleming	Sr
DB	35	Julian Winters	Fr
DB	38	Bennett Okotcha	Fr
DB	39	Dillon Schooley	Fr
LB	40	P.L. Lindley	Fr
LB	41	Erik Lee	So
DB	42	Jesse Paulsen	Jr
DE	44	Nathan Hughes	Fr
LB	45	Caleb Gastelum	Fr
DB	46	Jordan Finch	So
DB	47	Zach Montana	Jr
LB	51	Greg Offenburger	Fr
DT	52	Damon Williams	Fr
DT	53	Casey Walker	Jr
LB	55	Jayden Bird	Jr
DE	56	Ronnell Lewis	Jr
DT	58	Eric Humphrey	Fr
DT	73	Josh Aladenoye	So
DT	77	Marquis Anderson	Fr
DT	80	Jordan Phillips	Fr
DE	84	Frank Alexander	Sr
DE	85	Geneo Grissom	Fr
DE	90	David King	Jr
DE	91	R. J. Washington	Jr
DT	92	Stacy McGee	Jr
DT	94	Torrea Peterson	Fr
DT	95	Jordan Wade	Fr
DT	97	Jamarkus McFarland	Jr
DE	98	Chuka Ndulue	Fr
DE	99	Mitch Williams	Jr

Special teams

Pos.	#	Name	Class
K	17	Jimmy Stevens	Sr
K	18	Michael Hunnicutt	Fr
P	36	Tress Way (C)	Jr
K	43	Patrick O'Hara	Jr
DS	86	James Winchester	Sr
K	94	Eric Hosek	Fr

Head coach

- Bob Stoops (13th season)

Coordinators/assistant coaches

- Brent Venables – Associate head coach/defensive coordinator/linebackers
- Josh Heupel – Co-offensive Coordinator/quarterbacks
- Jay Norvell – Co-offensive Coordinator/wide receivers
- Bobby Jack Wright – Assistant Defensive coordinator/Defensive Ends
- Cale Gundy – Running backs/recruiting coordinator
- James Patton – Centers/Guards
- Jackie Shipp – Defensive line
- Willie Martinez – Defensive backs
- Bruce Kittle – Offensive tackles/tight ends

Legend

- (C) Team captain
- (S) Suspended
- (I) Ineligible
- Injured
- Redshirt

Roster
Last update: August 16, 2010

== Game summaries ==
=== Tulsa ===
Tulsa Golden Hurricanes at #1 Oklahoma Sooners

Team	1	2	3	4	Total
Tulsa	0	7	0	7	14
• #1 Oklahoma	10	20	14	3	47

- Date: September 3
- Location: Gaylord Family Oklahoma Memorial Stadium, Norman, OK
- Game start: 7:05 p.m. CDT
- Elapsed time: 3:25
- Game attendance: 85,260
- Game weather: 98 °F (37 °C), clear, winds E 10 mph (16 km/h)
- Referee: Rick Loumiet
- TV announcers (FX): Gus Johnson (Play-by-play), Charles Davis (Color) & Tim Brewster (Sideline)

Scoring summary
1	7:53	OU	Jimmy Stevens 28-yard field goal	OU 3–0
1	3:20	OU	Dominique Whaley 2-yard run (Jimmy Stevens kick)	OU 10–0
2	13:49	OU	Dominique Whaley 1-yard run (kick failed)	OU 16–0
2	6:56	OU	Dominique Whaley 6-yard run (Jimmy Stevens kick)	OU 23–0
2	4:23	OU	Ryan Broyles 4-yard pass from Landry Jones (Jimmy Stevens kick)	OU 30–0
2	2:54	TLSA	Bryan Burnham 56-yard pass from G.J. Kinnie (Kevin Fitzpatrick kick)	OU 30–7
3	10:23	OU	Brennan Clay 11-yard run (Jimmy Stevens kick)	OU 37–7
3	2:52	OU	Dominique Whaley 32-yard run (Jimmy Stevens kick)	OU 44–7
4	11:52	OU	Michael Hunnicutt 27-yard field goal	OU 47–7
4	10:29	TLSA	Trey Watts 24-yard pass from G.J. Kinnie (Kevin Fitzpatrick kick)	OU 47–14

=== Florida State ===
#1 Oklahoma Sooners at #5 Florida State Seminoles

Team	1	2	3	4	Total
• #1 Oklahoma	7	6	0	10	23
#5 Florida State	3	0	3	7	13

- Date: September 17
- Location: Doak Campbell Stadium, Tallahassee, FL
- Game start: 8:12 p.m. EDT
- Elapsed time: 3:08
- Game attendance: 84,392
- Game weather: 81 °F (27 °C), ENE 8 mph (13 km/h)
- Referee: Scott Novak
- TV announcers (ABC): Brent Musburger (Play-by-play), Kirk Herbstreit (Color) & Erin Andrews & Tom Rinaldi (Sideline)

Scoring summary
1	8:35	OU	Landry Jones 1-yard run (Jimmy Stevens kick)	OU 7–0
1	2:42	FSU	Dustin Hopkins 53-yard field goal	OU 7–3
2	4:32	OU	Jimmy Stevens 21-yard field goal	OU 10–3
2	0:00	OU	Jimmy Stevens 29-yard field goal	OU 13–3
3	0:53	FSU	Dustin Hopkins 46-yard field goal	OU 13–6
4	9:32	FSU	Rashad Greene 56-yard pass from Clint Trickett (Dustin Hopkins kick)	Tied 13–13
4	7:00	OU	Kenny Stills 37-yard pass from Landry Jones (Jimmy Stevens kick)	OU 20–13
4	2:01	OU	Jimmy Stevens 31-yard field goal	OU 23–13

=== Missouri ===
Missouri Tigers at #1 Oklahoma Sooners

Team	1	2	3	4	Total
Missouri	14	0	0	14	28
• #1 Oklahoma	10	14	7	7	38

- Date: September 24
- Location: Gaylord Family Oklahoma Memorial Stadium, Norman, OK
- Game start: 7:05 p.m. CDT
- Elapsed time: 3:38
- Game attendance: 85,547
- Game weather: 87 °F (31 °C), partly cloudy, S 7 mph (11 km/h)
- Referee: Tom Walker
- TV announcers (FX): Gus Johnson (Play-by-play), Charles Davis (Color) & Tim Brewster (Sideline)

Scoring summary
1	11:18	MU	James Franklin 1-yard run (Grant Ressel kick)	MU 7–0
1	7:07	OU	Michael Hunnicutt 26-yard field goal	MU 7–3
1	6:00	MU	L'Damian Washington 45-yard pass from James Franklin (Grant Ressel kick)	MU 14–3
1	4:07	OU	Ryan Broyles 24-yard pass from Landry Jones (Michael Hunnicutt kick)	MU 14–10
2	6:36	OU	Ryan Broyles 4-yard pass from Landry Jones (Michael Hunnicutt kick)	OU 17–14
2	4:10	OU	Landry Jones 1-yard run (Michael Hunnicutt kick)	OU 24–14
3	6:20	OU	Dominique Whaley 3-yard run (Michael Hunnicutt kick)	OU 31–14
4	6:44	MU	Josey Henry 48-yard run (Grant Ressel kick)	OU 31–21
4	3:35	OU	Ryan Broyles 4-yard pass from Landry Jones (Michael Hunnicutt kick)	OU 38–21
4	0:32	MU	James Franklin 1-yard run (Grant Ressel kick)	OU 38–28

=== Ball State ===
Ball State Cardinals at #2 Oklahoma Sooners

Team	1	2	3	4	Total
Ball State	3	3	0	0	6
• #2 Oklahoma	10	28	21	3	62

- Date: October 1
- Location: Gaylord Family Oklahoma Memorial Stadium, Norman, OK
- Game start: 6:06 p.m. CDT
- Elapsed time: 3:19
- Game attendance: 84,921
- Game weather: 79 °F (26 °C), clear, wind E 8 mph (13 km/h)
- Referee: Dan Romeo
- TV announcers (FSSW/PPV): Chuck Cooperstein (Play-by-play), Dean Blevins (Color), Roy Williams (Color) & Kelly Crull (Sideline)

Scoring summary

Quarter	Time	Drive			Team	Scoring information	Score	
Quarter	Time	Plays	Yards	TOP	Team	Scoring information	Ball State	Oklahoma
1	10:14	10	85	2:46	Oklahoma	James Hanna 6-yard touchdown reception from Landry Jones, Michael Hunnicutt kick good	0	7
1	6:59	4	9	1:25	Ball State	34-yard field goal by Steven Schott	3	7
1	4:52	9	45	2:00	Oklahoma	44-yard field goal by Michael Hunnicutt	3	10
2	12:38	15	61	7:08	Ball State	31-yard field goal by Steven Schott	6	10
2	8:22	12	92	4:09	Oklahoma	Dominique Whaley 25-yard touchdown run, Michael Hunnicutt kick good	6	17
2	7:33	2	10	0:37	Oklahoma	Kenny Stills 7-yard touchdown reception from Landry Jones, Michael Hunnicutt kick good	6	24
2	3:44	6	77	2:27	Oklahoma	Dominique Whaley 1-yard touchdown run, Michael Hunnicutt kick good	6	31
2	2:53	2	27	0:13	Oklahoma	Ryan Broyles 27-yard touchdown reception from Landry Jones, Michael Hunnicutt kick good	6	38
3	12:42	2	64	0:44	Oklahoma	Ryan Broyles 64-yard touchdown reception from Landry Jones, Michael Hunnicutt kick good	6	45
3	11:42	1	56	0:09	Oklahoma	Jaz Reynolds 56-yard touchdown reception from Landry Jones, Michael Hunnicutt kick good	6	52
3	11:34				Oklahoma	Fumble recovery returned 22 yards for touchdown by Tom Wort, Michael Hunnicutt kick good	6	59
4	13:42	12	63	5:00	Oklahoma	39-yard field goal by Michael Hunnicutt	6	62
"TOP" = time of possession. For other American football terms, see Glossary of American football.							6	62

=== Texas (Red River Rivalry) ===
#3 Oklahoma Sooners vs. #11 Texas Longhorns

Team	1	2	3	4	Total
• #3 Oklahoma	6	28	14	7	55
#11 Texas	3	7	0	7	17

- Date: October 8
- Location: Cotton Bowl, Dallas, TX
- Game start: 11:09 a.m. CDT
- Elapsed time: 3:34
- Game attendance: 96,009
- Game weather: 78 °F (26 °C), mostly cloudy, SSE 15 mph (24 km/h)
- Referee: Scott Novak
- TV announcers (ABC): Brent Musburger (Play-by-play), Kirk Herbstreit (Color), Erin Andrews (Sideline) & Tom Rinaldi (Sideline)

Scoring summary
1	12:14	OU	Michael Hunnicutt 26-yard field goal	OU 3–0
1	7:10	OU	Michael Hunnicutt 24-yard field goal	OU 6–0
1	2:41	TEX	Justin Tucker 46-yard field goal	OU 6–3
2	14:56	OU	Kenny Stills 19-yard pass from Landry Jones (Michael Hunnicutt kick)	OU 13–3
2	11:43	OU	Ryan Broyles 5-yard pass from Landry Jones (Michael Hunnicutt kick)	OU 20–3
2	2:57	OU	Demontre Hurst 55-yard interception return (Michael Hunnicutt kick)	OU 27–3
2	2:44	TEX	Fozzy Whittaker 100-yard kickoff return (Justin Tucker kick)	OU 27–10
2	0:31	OU	Kenny Stills 14-yard pass from Landry Jones (Michael Hunnicutt kick)	OU 34–10
3	13:35	OU	David King 19-yard fumble return (Michael Hunnicutt kick)	OU 41–10
3	8:02	OU	Dominique Whaley 64-yard run (Michael Hunnicutt kick)	OU 48–10
4	11:22	OU	Jamell Fleming 56-yard fumble return (Michael Hunnicutt kick)	OU 55–10
4	2:31	TEX	Jaxon Shipley 4-yard pass from David Ash (Justin Tucker kick)	OU 55–17

=== Kansas ===
#3 Oklahoma Sooners at Kansas Jayhawks

Team	1	2	3	4	Total
• #3 Oklahoma	10	17	3	17	47
Kansas	7	10	0	0	17

- Date: October 15
- Location: Memorial Stadium, Lawrence, KS
- Game start: 8:21 p.m. CDT
- Elapsed time: 3:37
- Game attendance: 42,580
- Game weather: 68 °F (20 °C), clear, S 9 mph (14 km/h)
- Referee: Rick Loumiet
- TV announcers (ESPN2): Carter Blackburn (Play-by-play) & Brock Huard (Color)

Scoring summary

Quarter	Time	Drive			Team	Scoring information	Score	
Quarter	Time	Plays	Yards	TOP	Team	Scoring information	Oklahoma	Kansas
1	11:32	4	35	0:56	Oklahoma	Kenny Stills 17-yard touchdown reception from Landry Jones, Michael Hunnicutt kick good	7	0
1	5:21	11	68	3:52	Oklahoma	36-yard field goal by Michael Hunnicutt	10	0
1	2:59	6	81	2:15	Kansas	James Sims 56-yard touchdown run, Alex Mueller kick good	10	7
2	11:47	4	7	1:42	Kansas	36-yard field goal by Alex Mueller	10	10
2	9:13	9	70	2:30	Oklahoma	Roy Finch 8-yard touchdown run, Michael Hunnicutt kick good	17	10
2	7:50	1	57	0:08	Oklahoma	Ryan Broyles 57-yard touchdown reception from Landry Jones, Michael Hunnicutt kick good	24	10
2	3:43	9	77	4:01	Kansas	Darrian Miller 2-yard touchdown run, Alex Mueller kick good	24	17
2	0:03	13	65	3:35	Oklahoma	19-yard field goal by Michael Hunnicutt	27	17
3	4:05	12	51	3:53	Oklahoma	27-yard field goal by Michael Hunnicutt	30	17
4	14:18	6	33	2:32	Oklahoma	20-yard field goal by Michael Hunnicutt	33	17
4	10:22	6	85	2:40	Oklahoma	Ryan Broyles 43-yard touchdown reception from Landry Jones, Michael Hunnicutt kick good	40	17
4	3:53	5	36	2:58	Oklahoma	Dominique Whaley 10-yard touchdown run, Michael Hunnicutt kick good	47	17
"TOP" = time of possession. For other American football terms, see Glossary of American football.							47	17

=== Texas Tech ===
Texas Tech Raiders at #3 Oklahoma Sooners

Team	1	2	3	4	Total
• Texas Tech	7	17	7	10	41
#3 Oklahoma	7	0	10	21	38

- Date: October 22
- Location: Gaylord Family Oklahoma Memorial Stadium, Norman, OK
- Game start: 8:45 p.m. CDT
- Elapsed time: 3:43
- Game attendance: 85,204
- Game weather: 81 °F (27 °C), scattered showers, S 9 mph (14 km/h)
- Referee: Mike Defee
- TV announcers (ABC/ESPN3): Brad Nessler (Play-by-play), Todd Blackledge (Color) & Holly Rowe (Sideline)

The Red Raiders' victory over the Sooners ended Oklahoma's 39-game home winning streak, which started in 2005 after a loss to TCU in the season opener. The game was the Sooners’ first Big 12 Conference loss at Owen Field since 2001 and only the third time the team had lost at home under Bob Stoops.

Scoring summary

Quarter	Time	Drive			Team	Scoring information	Score	
Quarter	Time	Plays	Yards	TOP	Team	Scoring information	Texas Tech	Oklahoma
1	13:52	4	54	1:08	Texas Tech	Alex Torres 44-yard touchdown reception from Seth Doege, Donnie Carona kick good	7	0
1	12:52	3	69	0:54	Oklahoma	Kenny Stills 15-yard touchdown reception from Landry Jones, Michael Hunnicutt kick good	7	7
2	11:16	10	78	3:39	Texas Tech	Seth Doege 1-yard touchdown run, Donnie Corona kick good	14	7
2	8:56	8	69	2:01	Texas Tech	Alex Torres 30-yard touchdown reception from Seth Doege, Donnie Carona kick good	21	7
2	1:26	9	24	3:07	Texas Tech	40-yard field goal by Donnie Corona	24	7
3	12:57	4	72	1:19	Texas Tech	Alex Torres 11-yard touchdown reception from Seth Doege, Donnie Corona kick good	31	7
3	11:16	4	70	1:35	Oklahoma	Kenny Stills 58-yard touchdown reception from Landry Jones, Michael Hunnicutt kick good	31	14
3	2:38	8	50	3:48	Oklahoma	22-yard field goal by Michael Hunnicutt	31	17
4	14:55	7	44	2:00	Oklahoma	Trey Millard 3-yard touchdown reception from Landry Jones, Michael Hunnicutt kick good	31	24
4	12:06	10	54	2:44	Texas Tech	37-yard field goal by Donnie Corona	34	24
4	7:38	6	74	3:01	Texas Tech	Tramain Swindell 14-yard touchdown reception from Seth Doege, Donnie Corona kick good	41	24
4	6:45	5	71	0:48	Oklahoma	Jaz Reynolds 55-yard touchdown reception from Landry Jones, Michael Hunnicutt kick good	41	31
4	1:10	4	60	0:35	Oklahoma	James Hanna 22-yard touchdown reception from Landry Jones, Michael Hunnicutt kick good	41	38
"TOP" = time of possession. For other American football terms, see Glossary of American football.							41	38

=== Kansas State ===
#11 Oklahoma Sooners at #10 Kansas State Wildcats

Team	1	2	3	4	Total
• #11 Oklahoma	14	9	21	14	58
#10 Kansas State	3	14	0	0	17

- Date: October 29
- Location: Bill Snyder Family Football Stadium, Manhattan, KS
- Game start: 2:36 p.m. CDT
- Elapsed time: 3:18
- Game attendance: 51,004
- Game weather: 68 °F (20 °C), sunny, SW 16 mph (26 km/h)
- Referee: Greg Burks
- TV announcers (ESPN): Sean McDonough (Play-by-play), Matt Millen (Color) & Heather Cox (Sideline)

Scoring summary

Quarter	Time	Drive			Team	Scoring information	Score	
Quarter	Time	Plays	Yards	TOP	Team	Scoring information	Oklahoma	Kansas State
1	12:12	9	80	2:48	Oklahoma	Blake Bell 1-yard touchdown run, Michael Hunnicutt kick good	7	0
1	7:10	8	77	2:56	Oklahoma	DeJuan Miller 11-yard touchdown reception from Landry Jones, Michael Hunnicutt kick good	14	0
1	6:07	4	2	1:03	Kansas State	54-yard field goal by Anthony Cantele	14	3
2	14:52	6	88	2:47	Kansas State	Collin Klein 42-yard touchdown run, Anthony Cantele kick good	14	10
2	12:44	3	47	0:54	Kansas State	Collin Klein 2-yard touchdown run, Anthony Cantele kick good	14	17
2	11:20	4	62	1:24	Oklahoma	Jaz Reynolds 18-yard touchdown reception from Landry Jones, Michael Hunnicutt kick blocked	20	17
2	0:00	4	0	0:19	Oklahoma	53-yard field goal by Michael Hunnicutt	23	17
3	10:22	5	63	1:18	Oklahoma	Ryan Broyles 29-yard touchdown reception from Landry Jones, Michael Hunnicutt kick good	30	17
3	4:26	6	68	2:40	Oklahoma	Jaz Reynolds 8-yard touchdown reception from Landry Jones, Michael Hunnicutt kick good	37	17
3	1:27	4	62	0:50	Oklahoma	Roy Finch 31-yard touchdown run, Michael Hunnicutt kick good	44	17
4	14:22	3	67	0:48	Oklahoma	Trent Ratterree 12-yard touchdown reception from Landry Jones, Michael Hunnicutt kick good	51	17
4	11:03	3	72	1:27	Oklahoma	Trey Millard 61-yard touchdown run, Michael Hunnicutt kick good	58	17
"TOP" = time of possession. For other American football terms, see Glossary of American football.							58	17

=== Texas A&M ===
Texas A&M Aggies at #7 Oklahoma Sooners

Team	1	2	3	4	Total
Texas A&M	3	7	0	15	25
• #7 Oklahoma	7	6	28	0	41

- Date: November 5
- Location: Gaylord Family Oklahoma Memorial Stadium, Norman, OK
- Game start: 2:36 p.m. CDT
- Elapsed time: 3:48
- Game attendance: 85,709
- Game weather: 64 °F (18 °C), sunny, SSE 20 mph (32 km/h)
- Referee: Randy Christal
- TV announcers (ABC/ESPN2): Sean McDonough (Play-by-play), Matt Millen (Color) & Heather Cox (Sideline)

Scoring summary

Quarter	Time	Drive			Team	Scoring information	Score	
Quarter	Time	Plays	Yards	TOP	Team	Scoring information	Texas A&M	Oklahoma
1	6:16	8	28	1:52	Texas A&M	43-yard field goal by Randy Bullock	3	0
1	3:32	7	80	2:44	Oklahoma	Blake Bell 2-yard touchdown run, Michael Hunnicutt kick good	3	7
2	12:59	4	6	1:33	Oklahoma	29-yard field goal by Michael Hunnicutt	3	10
2	2:25	18	58	6:24	Oklahoma	39-yard field goal by Michael Hunnicutt	3	13
2	1:39	3	80	0:46	Texas A&M	Ryan Swope 79-yard touchdown reception from Ryan Tannehill, Randy Bullock kick good	10	13
3	11:26	1	31	0:07	Oklahoma	Jaz Reynolds 31-yard touchdown reception from Landry Jones, Michael Hunnicutt kick good	10	20
3	9:11	5	28	1:18	Oklahoma	Roy Finch 3-yard touchdown run, Michael Hunnicutt kick good	10	27
3	4:53	8	69	3:03	Oklahoma	Blake Bell 4-yard touchdown run, Michael Hunnicutt kick good	10	34
3	4:38	1	39	0:07	Oklahoma	Kenny Stills 39-yard touchdown reception from Landry Jones, Michael Hunnicutt kick good	10	41
4	9:49	12	81	3:32	Texas A&M	Ben Malena 16-yard touchdown run, Randy Bullock kick good	17	41
4	2:37	9	95	2:49	Texas A&M	Cyrus Gray 8-yard touchdown reception from Ryan Tannehill, 2-point pass good	25	41
"TOP" = time of possession. For other American football terms, see Glossary of American football.							25	41

=== Baylor ===
#5 Oklahoma Sooners at #25 Baylor Bears

Team	1	2	3	4	Total
#5 Oklahoma	3	7	14	14	38
• #25 Baylor	3	14	14	14	45

- Date: November 19
- Location: Floyd Casey Stadium, Waco, TX
- Game start: 7:12 p.m. CST
- Elapsed time: 3:49
- Game attendance: 40,281
- Game weather: 76 °F (24 °C), cloudy, S 12 mph (19 km/h)
- Referee: Mike Defee
- TV announcers (ABC/ESPN3): Joe Tessitore (Play-by-play), Matt Millen (Color) & Erin Andrews (Sideline)

Scoring summary

Quarter	Time	Drive			Team	Scoring information	Score	
Quarter	Time	Plays	Yards	TOP	Team	Scoring information	Oklahoma	Baylor
1	5:34	5	23	0:43	Oklahoma	47-yard field goal by Michael Hunnicutt	3	0
1	1:09	9	59	4:25	Baylor	34-yard field goal by Aaron Jones	3	3
2	7:14	3	83	0:36	Baylor	Terrance Ganaway 15-yard touchdown run, Aaron Jones kick good	3	10
2	2:38	11	72	4:36	Oklahoma	Blake Bell 3-yard touchdown run, Michael Hunnicutt kick good	10	10
2	2:23	1	69	0:15	Baylor	Tevin Reese 69-yard touchdown reception from Robert Griffin III, Aaron Jones kick good	10	17
3	13:13	4	69	1:47	Oklahoma	Trey Millard 5-yard touchdown run, Michael Hunnicutt kick good	17	17
3	11:11	2	32	0:41	Oklahoma	Blake Bell 1-yard touchdown run, Michael Hunnicutt kick good	24	17
3	6:39	2	84	0:49	Baylor	Kendall Wright 87-yard touchdown reception from Robert Griffin III, Aaron Jones kick good	24	24
3	1:15	10	85	2:40	Baylor	Jordan Najvar 13-yard touchdown reception from Robert Griffin III, Aaron Jones kick good	24	31
4	12:49	4	74	1:21	Baylor	Terrance Ganaway 11-yard touchdown run, Aaron Jones kick good	24	38
4	5:55	7	75	2:32	Oklahoma	Blake Bell 4-yard touchdown run, Michael Hunnicutt kick good	31	38
4	0:51	10	77	2:38	Oklahoma	Blake Bell 6-yard touchdown run, Michael Hunnicutt kick good	38	38
4	0:08	5	80	0:43	Baylor	Terrance Williams 34-yard touchdown reception from Robert Griffin III, Aaron Jones kick good	38	45
"TOP" = time of possession. For other American football terms, see Glossary of American football.							38	45

=== Iowa State ===
Iowa State Cyclones at #12 Oklahoma Sooners

Team	1	2	3	4	Total
Iowa State	6	0	0	0	6
• #12 Oklahoma	3	20	0	3	26

- Date: November 26
- Location: Gaylord Family Oklahoma Memorial Stadium, Norman, OK
- Game start: 11:06 a.m. CST
- Elapsed time: 3:18
- Game attendance: 84,326
- Game weather: 48 °F (9 °C), overcast, NNW 32 mph (51 km/h)
- Referee: Matt Loeffler
- TV announcers (FX): Gus Johnson (Play-by-play), Charles Davis (Color) & Tim Brewster (Sideline)

Scoring summary

Quarter	Time	Drive			Team	Scoring information	Score	
Quarter	Time	Plays	Yards	TOP	Team	Scoring information	Iowa State	Oklahoma
1	11:15	8	18	3:14	Oklahoma	20-yard field goal by Michael Hunnicutt	0	3
1	5:48	1	10	0:05	Iowa State	Albert Gary 10-yard touchdown reception from Jared Barnett, Zach Guyer kick failed	6	3
2	8:12	10	79	4:53	Oklahoma	Blake Bell 3-yard touchdown run, Michael Hunnicutt kick good	6	10
2	3:22	6	68	2:12	Oklahoma	Blake Bell 1-yard touchdown run, Michael Hunnicutt kick good	6	17
2	0:25	9	33	1:44	Oklahoma	28-yard field goal by Michael Hunnicutt	6	20
3	0:00	5	22	0:23	Oklahoma	37-yard field goal by Michael Hunnicutt	6	23
4	6:48	6	53	2:28	Oklahoma	21-yard field goal by Michael Hunnicutt	6	26
"TOP" = time of possession. For other American football terms, see Glossary of American football.							6	26

=== Oklahoma State (Bedlam Series) ===
#13 Oklahoma Sooners at #3 Oklahoma State Cowboys

Team	1	2	3	4	Total
#13 Oklahoma	0	3	0	7	10
• #3 Oklahoma State	10	14	20	0	44

- Date: December 3
- Location: Boone Pickens Stadium, Stillwater, OK
- Game start: 7:13 p.m. CST
- Elapsed time: 3:15
- Game attendance: 58,141
- Game weather: 38 °F (3 °C), overcast W 7 mph (11 km/h)
- Referee: Scott Novak
- TV announcers (ABC): Brad Nessler (Play-by-play), Todd Blackledge (Color) & Holly Rowe (Sideline)

Scoring summary
1	8:36	OSU	Jeremy Smith 9-yard run (Quinn Sharp kick)	OSU 7–0
1	2:51	OSU	Quinn Sharp 25-yard field goal	OSU 10–0
2	4:39	OSU	Joseph Randle 1-yard run (Quinn Sharp kick)	OSU 17–0
2	1:05	OSU	Joseph Randle 2-yard run (Quinn Sharp kick)	OSU 24–0
2	0:00	OU	Michael Hunnicutt 48-yard field goal	OSU 24–3
3	12:02	OSU	Quinn Sharp 37-yard field goal	OSU 27–3
3	11:56	OSU	Richetti Jones 5-yard fumble return (Quinn Sharp kick)	OSU 34–3
3	5:23	OSU	Jeremy Smith 37-yard run (Quinn Sharp kick)	OSU 41–3
3	1:56	OSU	Quinn Sharp 34-yard field goal	OSU 44–3
4	2:25	OU	Blake Bell 28-yard run (Michael Hunnicutt kick)	OSU 44–10

The 106th Bedlam game drew the largest crowd to ever watch a Bedlam game in Stillwater, a total of 58,141 people. Coming into the game at #3 and #10, the two teams tied for the second highest average ranking (6.5) in series history, behind the 1984 matchup and tied with the 1987 game. OSU's #3 ranking was the highest it was ranked coming into the Bedlam game since 1984. This year, Oklahoma State was looking to beat Oklahoma for the first time since 2002, while also trying to win their first outright conference title since 1948 in the three-team Missouri Valley conference. Oklahoma, on the other hand, was trying to upset OSU for the third year in a row and get their ninth Bedlam win in a row, which would also get them a share of their 8th Big 12 title and their second in a row. This was only the 5th time in the 106-year history of the Bedlam Series that OSU was ranked higher than OU going into the game. The last time was the year before, when the #14 Sooners upset the #10 Cowboys in Stillwater.

The game started out great for Oklahoma State, and pretty much stayed that way. After three punts (two by Oklahoma and one by OSU), the Cowboys finally put it into the endzone. On the following drive, OU junior QB Landry Jones was intercepted in the OSU endzone by Oklahoma State defender Broderick Brown. The Cowboys brought it all the way to the Sooner 8-yard line but were forced to settle for a field goal. After two punts by each team, QB Jones fumbled the football at the Oklahoma State 19-yard line, and OSU DE Jamie Blatnick returned it to the Sooner 1-yard line. On the next play, sophomore RB Joseph Randle took it in for the score to make it 17–0, OSU. The second half ended at 24–3, Cowboys up by 21. The third quarter was even more lopsided than the first two. Oklahoma State scored 20 points to go into the fourth quarter up by a score of 44–3. The final score came with under 2:40 left in the game, when OU backup redshirt freshman QB Blake Bell scored on a meaningless 28-yard rushing TD.

Oklahoma QB Landry Jones' passer rating of 88 was his lowest since Oklahoma's loss to Nebraska in 2009 in his freshman season. His 250 yards was his second lowest of the season behind only his 199 yards against Florida State and his two interceptions were tied for the most of his season. Also, his 23-yard longest pass was his shortest longest pass in a game he started in his entire career. The final score of 44–10 was the most points Oklahoma State had scored and the largest margin of victory the Cowboys had had since the 1945 Bedlam game, when #6 Oklahoma State demolished unranked OU, 47–0. The win gave OSU their first Big 12 title.

=== Iowa (Insight Bowl) ===
Iowa Hawkeyes vs. #19 Oklahoma Sooners

Team	1	2	3	4	Total
Iowa	0	0	0	14	14
• #19 Oklahoma	7	7	7	10	31

- Date: December 30
- Location: Sun Devil Stadium, Tempe, AZ
- Game start: 8:11 p.m. MST
- Elapsed time: 3:23
- Game attendance: 54,247
- Game weather: 62 °F (17 °C), clear, 0 mph (0 km/h)
- Referee: Jack Wood
- TV announcers (ESPN): Sean McDonough (Play-by-play), Matt Millen (Color) & Heather Cox (Sideline)

Scoring summary
1	10:19	OU	Blake Bell 4-yard run (Michael Hunnicutt kick)	OU 7–0
2	6:56	OU	Blake Bell 4-yard run (Michael Hunnicutt kick)	OU 14–0
3	7:42	OU	Trent Ratterree 3-yard pass from Landry Jones (Michael Hunnicutt kick)	OU 21–0
4	14:46	IOWA	C.J. Fiedorowicz 5-yard pass from James Vandenberg (Mike Meyer kick)	OU 21–7
4	6:56	IOWA	Jordan Canzeri 9-yard pass from James Vandenberg (Mike Meyer kick)	OU 21–14
4	2:28	OU	Michael Hunnicutt 35-yard field goal	OU 24–14
4	0:45	OU	Blake Bell 21-yard run (Michael Hunnicutt kick)	OU 31–14

Bob Stoops and assistant coach Bruce Kittle played for Iowa in a 1979 game against the Sooners.

== Rankings ==
Ranking movements Legend: ██ Increase in ranking ██ Decrease in ranking ( ) = First-place votes
	Week															
Poll	Pre	1	2	3	4	5	6	7	8	9	10	11	12	13	14	Final
AP	1 (36)	1 (32)	1 (31)	1 (37)	2 (12)	3 (7)	3 (8)	3 (6)	11	7	7	5	12	13	19	16
Coaches	1 (42)	1 (43)	1 (44)	1 (50)	1 (32)	1 (27)	1 (32)	1 (31)	9	7	7	5	11	11	19	15
Harris	Not released						3 (24)	3 (13)	8	7	7	5	10	10	19	Not released
BCS	Not released							3	9	6	6	5	9	10	14	Not released

== Statistics ==
=== Team ===
	OU	Opp
Points per Game	39.5	22.1
First Downs	337	250
Rushing	117	98
Passing	206	131
Penalty	14	21
Rushing Yardage	2,118	1,751
Rushing Attempts	469	476
Avg per Rush	4.5	3.7
Avg per Game	162.9	134.7
Passing Yardage	4,542	3,139
Avg per Game	349.4	241.5
Completions-Attempts	365–583 (62.6%)	257–474 (54.2%)
Total Offense	6,660	4,890
Total Plays	1,052	950
Avg per Play	6.3	5.1
Avg per Game	512.3	376.2
Fumbles-Lost	17–13	20–12

	OU	Opp
Punts-Yards	63–2,649 (42 avg)	92–3,790 (41.2 avg)
Punt returns-Total Yards	27–234 (8.7 avg)	12–139 (11.6 avg)
Kick returns-Total Yards	41–886 (21.6 avg)	75–1,489 (19.9 avg)
Onside Kicks	0–1 (0%)	1–2 (50%)
Avg Time of Possession per Game	29:59	30:01
Penalties-Yards	64–592	81–569
Avg per Game	45.5	43.8
3rd Down Conversions	80/193 (41.5%)	60/197 (30.5%)
4th Down Conversions	9/14 (64.3%)	7/19 (36.8%)
Sacks By-Yards	40–288	11–80
Total TDs	63	35
Rushing	30	15
Passing	29	18
Fields Goals-Attempts	25–28 (89.3%)	14–19 (73.7%)
PAT-Attempts	61–63 (96.8%)	33–34 (97%)
Total Attendance	510,967	276,398
Games-Avg per Game	6–85,161	5–55,280

=== Scores by quarter ===
	1	2	3	4	Total
Opponents	62	93	44	88	287
Oklahoma	94	165	139	116	514

== 2012 NFL draft ==
The 2012 NFL draft was held on April 26–28, 2012 at Radio City Music Hall in New York City. The following Oklahoma players were either selected or signed as undrafted free agents following the draft.

Player	Position	Round	Overall pick	NFL team
Ryan Broyles	WR	2nd	54	Detroit Lions
Donald Stephenson	OT	3rd	74	Kansas City Chiefs
Jamell Fleming	CB	3rd	80	Arizona Cardinals
Frank Alexander	DE	4th	103	Carolina Panthers
Ronnell Lewis	LB	4th	125	Detroit Lions
James Hanna	TE	6th	186	Dallas Cowboys
Travis Lewis	LB	7th	223	Detroit Lions
Sam Proctor	DB	Undrafted		Detroit Lions
