= 2011 Kansas Jayhawks football team =

American college football season

2011 Kansas Jayhawks football
- Conference: Big 12 Conference
- Record: 2–10 (0–9 Big 12)
- Head coach: Turner Gill (2nd season)
- Offensive coordinator: Chuck Long (2nd season)
- Offensive scheme: Spread
- Defensive coordinator: Vic Shealy (1st season)
- Base defense: 3–4
- Home stadium: Memorial Stadium

2011 Big 12 Conference football standings
	Conf.			Overall
Team	W		L	W		L
No. 3 Oklahoma State $	8	–	1	12	–	1
No. 15 Kansas State	7	–	2	10	–	3
No. 13 Baylor	6	–	3	10	–	3
No. 16 Oklahoma	6	–	3	10	–	3
Missouri	5	–	4	8	–	5
Texas	4	–	5	8	–	5
Texas A&M	4	–	5	7	–	6
Iowa State	3	–	6	6	–	7
Texas Tech	2	–	7	5	–	7
Kansas	0	–	9	2	–	10
$ – BCS representative as conference champion; Rankings from AP Poll

The 2011 Kansas Jayhawks football team represented the University of Kansas in the 2011 NCAA Division I FBS football season. The Jayhawks were led by second year head coach Turner Gill and played their home games at Memorial Stadium. They were a member of the Big 12 Conference.

The Jayhawks were picked to finish last by most voters in the preseason Big 12 polls. The Jayhawks conference schedule began with a loss at home to Texas Tech and ended with a loss to the Missouri in the Border Showdown game at Arrowhead Stadium in Kansas City. The Jayhawks finished with a 2–10 record, 0–9 in Big 12 play, and did not play in a bowl game for the third straight year. The Jayhawks had one of the toughest schedules in the nation. The Jayhawks schedule is currently ranked 4th in the nation according to Collegefootballpoll.com. During the season, the Jayhawks played Texas A&M and Missouri as members of the Big 12 for the final time, as both schools left for the SEC in July 2012.

== Schedule ==
Date	Time	Opponent	Site	TV	Result	Attendance
September 3	6:00 p.m.	No. 20 (FCS) McNeese State*	Memorial Stadium; Lawrence, KS	6Sports	W 42–24	41,068
September 10	6:00 p.m.	Northern Illinois*	Memorial Stadium; Lawrence, KS	FCS	W 45–42	48,084
September 17	11:30 a.m.	at Georgia Tech*	Bobby Dodd Stadium; Atlanta, GA	FSN	L 24–66	42,025
October 1	11:00 a.m.	Texas Tech^{†}	Memorial Stadium; Lawrence, KS	FSN	L 35–46	39,621
October 8	2:30 p.m.	at No. 7 Oklahoma State	Boone Pickens Stadium; Stillwater, OK		L 28–70	58,030
October 15	8:15 p.m.	No. 1 Oklahoma	Memorial Stadium; Lawrence, KS	ESPN2	L 17–47	42,580
October 22	11:00 a.m.	No. 16 Kansas State	Memorial Stadium; Lawrence, KS (Sunflower Showdown/Governor's Cup)	FSN	L 21–59	47,157
October 29	6:00 p.m.	at Texas	Darrell K Royal–Texas Memorial Stadium; Austin, TX	LHN	L 0–43	99,211
November 5	11:30 a.m.	at Iowa State	Jack Trice Stadium; Ames, IA	FCS	L 10–13	51,575
November 12	1:00 p.m.	Baylor	Memorial Stadium; Lawrence, KS		L 30–31 ^{OT}	35,188
November 19	11:00 a.m.	at Texas A&M	Kyle Field; College Station, TX	FSN	L 7–61	86,411
November 26	2:30 p.m.	vs. Missouri	Arrowhead Stadium; Kansas City, MO (Border War)	FSN	L 10–24	47,059
*Non-conference game; ^{†}Homecoming; Rankings from Coaches' Poll released prior to the game; All times are in Central time

== Game summaries ==
=== McNeese State ===
Game One – McNeese State Cowboys (0–0) at Kansas Jayhawks (0–0)

Quarter	1	2	3	4	Total
No. 20 (FCS) Cowboys	0	3	13	8	24
» Jayhawks	7	14	7	14	42

at Memorial Stadium • Lawrence, Kansas

- Date: Saturday, September 3, 2011
- Game time: 6:00 p.m. CDT
- Game attendance: 41,068

Scoring summary

Quarter	Time	Drive			Team	Scoring information	Score	
Quarter	Time	Plays	Yards	TOP	Team	Scoring information	McN	KAN
1	5:30	8	84	2:41	KAN	Daymond Patterson 25-yard touchdown reception from Jordan Webb, Alex Mueller kick good	0	7
2	11:52	17	68	8:31	McN	26-yard field goal by Josh Lewis	3	7
2	8:00	8	73	3:47	KAN	James Sims 1-yard touchdown run, Alex Mueller kick good	3	14
2	1:51	12	67	4:09	KAN	Tony Pierson 13-yard touchdown run, Alex Mueller kick good	3	21
3	9:48	12	76	5:07	McN	Champlain Babin 14-yard touchdown reception from Cody Stroud, Josh Lewis kick good	10	21
3	8:02	6	61	1:40	KAN	JaCorey Shepherd 56-yard touchdown reception from Jordan Webb, Alex Mueller kick good	10	28
3	4:24	7	51	3:28	McN	Wes Briscoe 32-yard touchdown reception from Riley Dodge, Josh Lewis kick failed	16	28
4	13:20	7	45	2:41	KAN	Jordan Webb 8-yard touchdown run, Alex Mueller kick good	16	35
4	8:32	4	64	1:21	McN	Cody Stroud 1-yard touchdown run, 2-point pass good	24	35
4	6:30	5	70	1:56	KAN	JaCorey Shepherd 48-yard touchdown reception from Jordan Webb, Alex Mueller kick good	24	42
"TOP" = time of possession. For other American football terms, see Glossary of American football.							24	42

Statistics	McN	KAN
First downs	22	23
Total yards	420	447
Rushes–yards	33–95	55–301
Passing yards	339	158
Passing: Comp–Att–Int	31–41–0	7–10–0
Time of possession	21:27	15:29

Team	Category	Player	Statistics
McNeese State	Passing	Cody Stroud	22/27, 218 yards, 1 TD
McNeese State	Rushing	Riley Dodge	11 carries, 45 yards
McNeese State	Receiving	Champlain Babin	5 receptions, 108 yards, 1 TD
Kansas	Passing	Jordan Webb	7/10, 146 yards, 3 TD
Kansas	Rushing	James Sims	19 carries, 104 yards, 1 TD
Kansas	Receiving	JaCorey Shepherd	3 receptions, 107 yards, 2 TD

=== Northern Illinois ===
Game Two – Northern Illinois Huskies (1–0) at Kansas Jayhawks (1–0)

Quarter	1	2	3	4	Total
Huskies	7	14	14	7	42
» Jayhawks	7	14	14	10	45

at Memorial Stadium • Lawrence, Kansas

- Date: Saturday, September 10, 2011
- Game time: 6:00 p.m. CDT
- Game attendance: 48,084

Scoring summary

Quarter	Time	Drive			Team	Scoring information	Score	
Quarter	Time	Plays	Yards	TOP	Team	Scoring information	NIU	KAN
1	7:51	11	68	4:06	KAN	D.J. Beshears 15-yard touchdown reception from Jordan Webb, Alex Mueller kick good	0	7
1	2:50	11	74	4:58	NIU	Chandler Harnish 7-yard touchdown run, Nabal Jefferson kick good	7	7
2	13:43	5	68	1:03	NIU	Chandler Harnish 12-yard touchdown run, Mathew Sims kick good	14	7
2	8:39	9	53	3:28	NIU	Martel Moore 8-yard touchdown reception from Chandler Harnish, Mathew Sims kick good	21	7
2	4:16	12	74	4:16	KAN	Darrian Miller 18-yard touchdown run, Alex Mueller kick good	21	14
2	0:17	6	70	1:29	KAN	Kale Pick 36-yard touchdown reception from Jordan Webb, Alex Mueller kick good	21	21
3	12:59	5	66	1:56	NIU	Chandler Harnish 26-yard touchdown run, Mathew Sims kick good	28	21
3	10:32	7	75	2:21	KAN	James Sims 8-yard touchdown run, Alex Mueller kick good	28	28
3	2:55	14	72	5:45	KAN	James Sims 1-yard touchdown run, Alex Mueller kick good	28	35
3	1:17	5	65	1:32	NIU	Da'Ron Brown 10-yard touchdown reception from Chandler Harnish, Mathew Sims kick good	35	35
4	8:50	16	73	7:24	KAN	27-yard field goal by Alex Mueller	35	38
4	5:03	11	85	3:41	NIU	Jasmin Hopkins 1-yard touchdown run, Mathew Sims kick good	42	38
4	0:09	11	47	4:40	KAN	D.J. Beshears 6-yard touchdown reception from Jordan Webb, Alex Mueller kick good	42	45
"TOP" = time of possession. For other American football terms, see Glossary of American football.							42	45

Statistics	NIU	KAN
First downs	27	32
Total yards	462	534
Rushes–yards	29–147	60–253
Passing yards	315	297
Passing: Comp–Att–Int	27–33–0	21–30–0
Time of possession	13:54	22:03

Team	Category	Player	Statistics
Northern Illinois	Passing	Chandler Harnish	27/33, 315 yards, 2 TD
Northern Illinois	Rushing	Chandler Harnish	11 carries, 89 yards, 3 TD
Northern Illinois	Receiving	Nathan Palmer	9 receptions, 86 yards
Kansas	Passing	Jordan Webb	21/30, 281 yards, 3 TD
Kansas	Rushing	James Sims	26 carries, 110 yards, 2 TD
Kansas	Receiving	D.J. Beshears	7 receptions, 70 yards, 2 TD

=== At Georgia Tech ===
Game Three – Kansas Jayhawks (2–0) at Georgia Tech Yellow Jackets (2–0)

Quarter	1	2	3	4	Total
Jayhawks	7	10	0	7	24
» Yellow Jackets	14	10	28	14	66

at Bobby Dodd Stadium • Atlanta, Georgia

- Date: Saturday, September 17, 2011
- Game time: 11:30 a.m. CDT (12:30 p.m. local EDT)
- Game attendance: 42,025

Scoring summary

Quarter	Time	Drive			Team	Scoring information	Score	
Quarter	Time	Plays	Yards	TOP	Team	Scoring information	KAN	GT
1	12:33	1	95	0:14	GT	Orwin Smith 95-yard touchdown run, Justin Moore kick good	0	7
1	7:09	11	72	5:16	KAN	Darrian Miller 10-yard touchdown run, Alex Mueller kick good	7	7
1	0:06	4	44	1:43	GT	Roddy Jones 4-yard touchdown run, Justin Moore kick good	7	14
2	9:03	13	71	5:57	KAN	Darrian Miller 11-yard touchdown run, Alex Mueller kick good	14	14
2	7:32	5	72	1:25	GT	David Sims 19-yard touchdown run, Justin Moore kick good	14	21
2	0:39	8	73	3:09	GT	24-yard field goal by Justin Moore	14	24
2	0:00	5	65	0:35	KAN	28-yard field goal by Alex Mueller	17	24
3	14:39	1	63	0:11	GT	Embry Peebles 63-yard touchdown run, Justin Moore kick good	17	31
3	10:34	4	74	2:23	GT	Orwin Smith 67-yard touchdown reception from Tevin Washington, Justin Moore kick good	17	38
3	6:55	1	52	0:07	GT	Roddy Jones 52-yard touchdown reception from Tevin Washington, Justin Moore kick good	17	45
3	3:30	6	74	2:17	GT	David Sims 21-yard touchdown run, Justin Moore kick good	17	52
4	11:44	10	68	5:23	GT	Synjyn Days 2-yard touchdown run, Justin Moore kick good	17	59
4	5:13	8	75	4:16	GT	Charles Perkins 3-yard touchdown run, Justin Moore kick good	17	66
4	2:24	9	63	2:41	KAN	Andrew Turzilli 10-yard touchdown reception from Quinn Mecham, Alex Mueller kick good	24	66
"TOP" = time of possession. For other American football terms, see Glossary of American football.							24	66

Statistics	KAN	GT
First downs	19	24
Total yards	362	768
Rushes–yards	42–151	50–604
Passing yards	212	175
Passing: Comp–Att–Int	17–27–0	4–7–0
Time of possession	19:07	16:26

Team	Category	Player	Statistics
Kansas	Passing	Jordan Webb	11/19, 148 yards
Kansas	Rushing	Darrian Miller	11 carries, 53 yards, 2 TD
Kansas	Receiving	D.J. Beshears	5 receptions, 65 yards
Georgia Tech	Passing	Tevin Washington	4/7, 164 yards, 2 TD
Georgia Tech	Rushing	Orwin Smith	5 carries, 157 yards, 1 TD
Georgia Tech	Receiving	Orwin Smith	2 receptions, 108 yards, 1 TD

=== Texas Tech ===
Game Four – Texas Tech Red Raiders (3–0) at Kansas Jayhawks (2–1)

Quarter	1	2	3	4	Total
» Red Raiders	7	17	21	0	45
Jayhawks	20	7	0	7	34

at Memorial Stadium • Lawrence, Kansas

- Date: Saturday, October 1, 2011
- Game time: 11:00 a.m. CDT
- Game attendance: 39,621

Scoring summary

Quarter	Time	Drive			Team	Scoring information	Score	
Quarter	Time	Plays	Yards	TOP	Team	Scoring information	TTU	KAN
1	13:10	4	41	1:50	KAN	James Sims 11-yard touchdown run, Alex Mueller kick failed	0	6
1	10:23	5	75	1:46	KAN	Brandon Bourbon 51-yard touchdown run, Alex Mueller kick good	0	13
1	3:39	5	25	2:54	KAN	Tim Biere (KAN) fumble recovered by Kale Pick in end zone for touchdown, Alex Mueller kick good	0	20
1	1:35	7	52	2:04	TTU	DeAndre Washington 1-yard touchdown run, Donnie Carona kick good	7	20
2	14:22	1	25	0:29	TTU	Eric Ward 40-yard touchdown reception from Seth Doege, Donnie Carona kick good	14	20
2	10:48	6	45	1:00	TTU	Jacoby Franks 13-yard touchdown reception from Seth Doege, Donnie Carona kick good	21	20
2	7:54	5	37	0:49	TTU	46-yard field goal by Donnie Carona	21	20
2	0:47	10	62	3:38	KAN	Rell Lewis 19-yard touchdown reception from Jordan Webb, Alex Mueller kick good	24	27
3	11:23	12	91	3:37	TTU	Eric Stephens 8-yard touchdown run, Donnie Carona kick good	31	27
3	5:21	11	80	3:29	TTU	Eric Stephens 1-yard touchdown run, Donnie Carona kick good	38	27
3	2:49	8	64	2:07	TTU	Eric Ward 18-yard touchdown reception from Seth Doege, Donnie Carona kick good	45	27
4	3:30	5	45	1:12	KAN	AJ Steward 10-yard touchdown reception from Jordan Webb, Alex Mueller kick good	45	34
"TOP" = time of possession. For other American football terms, see Glossary of American football.							45	34

Statistics	TTU	KAN
First downs	28	26
Total yards	530	478
Rushes–yards	40–164	51–239
Passing yards	373	244
Passing: Comp–Att–Int	29–46–1	16–22–3
Time of possession	17:30	23:37

Team	Category	Player	Statistics
Texas Tech	Passing	Seth Doege	29/46, 366 yards, 3 TD, 1 INT
Texas Tech	Rushing	Eric Stephens Jr.	26 carries, 124 yards, 2 TD
Texas Tech	Receiving	Cornelius Douglas	4 receptions, 98 yards
Kansas	Passing	Jordan Webb	16/22, 239 yards, 3 TD, 3 INT
Kansas	Rushing	Brandon Bourbon	10 carries, 101 yards, 1 TD
Kansas	Receiving	D.J. Beshears	3 receptions, 76 yards

== Roster ==
2011 Kansas Jayhawks football roster
(starters in bold)
**Quarterbacks**: 2 **Jordan Webb** – (redshirt) So.; 8 Quinn Meacham – Sr.; 14 Michael Cummings – Fr.; 16 Brock Berglund – Fr.; 17 Blake Jablonski – (redshirt) Fr.; **Running backs**: 3 Darrian Miller – Fr.; 6 Rell Lewis – (redshirt) Sr.; 23 Anthony Pierson – Fr.; 25 Brandon Bourbon – (redshirt) Fr.; 29 **James Sims** – So.; 37 Ryan Burton – (redshirt) So.; 39 Josh Smith – (redshirt) Fr.; 43 Ed Fink – (redshirt) Fr.; 45 Nick Sizemore – (redshirt) Jr.; **Wide receivers**: 7 **Kale Pick** – (redshirt) Jr.; 12 Christian Matthews – (redshirt) So.; 15 Daymond Patterson – Sr.; 18 Neal Barlow – (redshirt) So. (TR); 20 **D.J. Beshears** – Jr.; 22 Connor Embree – (redshirt) Fr. (TR); 26 Chase Knighton – (redshirt) Jr.; 80 Ricki Herod – (redshirt) Fr.; 81 Marquis Jackson – Fr.; 82 Andrew Turzilli – (redshirt) Fr.; 83 Chris Omigie – (redshirt) So.; 84 Brian Maura – (redshirt) Fr.; 88 Erick McGriff – (redshirt) So.; 89 JaCorey Shepherd – Fr.; **Tight ends**: 11 A.J. Steward – (redshirt) Sr.; 38 Justin Puthoff – (redshirt) So.; 41 Jimmay Mundine – (redshirt) Fr.; 44 Scott Baron – Fr.; 46 Chris McEnaney – Fr.; 49 Brandon Olson – Fr.; 85 Trent Smiley – (redshirt) Fr.; 86 **Tim Biere** – Sr.; 87 Ted McNulty – (redshirt) Sr.	**Offensive line**: 53 Tom Mabry – (redshirt) So.; 54 Justin Carnes – (redshirt) So. (long snapper); 59 Tanner Gibas – Fr. (long snapper); 62 Cooper Kerns – Fr.; 63 Chad Kolumber – (redshirt) Fr.; 66 Dylan Admire – Fr.; 67 **Duane Zlatnik** – (redshirt) Jr.; 68 Luke Luhrsen – Fr.; 69 **Trevor Marrongelli** – (redshirt) Jr.; 70 Gavin Howard – (redshirt) So.; 72 **Tanner Hawkinson** – (redshirt) Jr.; 73 Damon Martin – Fr.; 74 **Jeff Spikes** – (redshirt) Sr.; 75 Travis Bodenstein – Fr.; 76 Bryan Peters – Fr.; 77 **Jeremiah Hatch** – (redshirt) Sr.; 78 Josh Burgoon – (redshirt) So.; 79 Riley Spencer – (redshirt) So.; **Defensive line**: 35 **Toben Opurum** – Jr.; 38 Josh Richardson – (redshirt) Jr.; 55 Michael Reynolds – Fr.; 56 Javonte Daniel – Fr.; 62 Dylan Avery – (redshirt) Fr.; 64 Randall Dent – (redshirt) So.; 65 Mike Martinovich -Sr.; 71 John Williams – (redshirt) Jr.; 78 Shane Smith – (redshirt) So.; 90 **Kevin Young** – (redshirt) So.; 91 Pat Lewandowski – (redshirt) Fr.; 92 Patrick Dorsey – (redshirt) Sr.; 93 Ben Goodman – Fr.; 94 Tyrone Sellers – (redshirt) So.; 96 **Keba Agostinho** – So.; 97 **Richard Johnson, Jr.** – (redshirt) Sr.; 98 JaQwaylin Arps – (redshirt) Fr.; 99 Julius Green – Fr.	**Linebackers**: 2 **Darius Willis** – (redshirt) So.; 4 Prinz Kande – (redshirt) So.; 17 **Tunde Bakare** – Jr.; 31 Ben Heeney – Fr.; 34 Huldon Tharp – (redshirt) So.; 37 Brian Blackwell – (redshirt) So.; 41 Jake Love – Fr.; 44 Malcolm Walker – Jr.; 46 Steve Mestan – (redshirt) So.; 47 Isaac Wright – Jr.; 49 Tyler Hunt – (redshirt) Jr.; 50 Jake Farley – (redshirt) Fr.; 52 **Steven Johnson** – Sr.; 53 Ryan Karlin – Fr.; 57 Colin Garrett – Fr.; 59 Blake Abbott – (redshirt) Fr.; 60 Brandon Esposito – (redshirt) So.; **Cornerbacks**: 5 **Greg Brown** – (redshirt) Jr.; 10 Corrigan Powell – (redshirt) Jr.; 18 Adonis Saunders – Fr.; 19 **Isiah Barfield** – (redshirt) Sr.; 22 Dexter McDonald – (redshirt) Fr.; 26 Chris Robinson – Fr.; 30 Anthony Davis – (redshirt) Sr.; 33 Tyler Patmon – (redshirt) So.; 39 Dominic Foreman – Jr.; **Safeties**: 1 Lubbock Smith – (redshirt) Jr.; 9 **Keeston Terry** – So.; 14 Tyler Hill – Jr.; 24 **Bradley McDougald** – Jr.; 27 Victor Simmons – Fr.; 32 Dexter Linton – (redshirt) So.; 36 Brandon Hawks – (redshirt) Jr.; 40 Ray Mitchell – (redshirt) Fr.'; 43 Alex Matlock – Fr.; **Punters**: 13 **Ron Doherty** – So.; 19 Victor McBride – (redshirt) Fr.; **Kickers**: 10 **Alex Mueller** – Fr.; 13 Ron Doherty – So.

== Postseason coaching change ==
Following their 59–21 loss to rival Kansas State, Kansas Athletic Director Sheahon Zenger, expressed his displeasure to the Jayhawks performance during the season in a press conference. In the press conference, Zenger said "I don't expect any player, coach, administrator, fan or alum to accept the performance on the field today or in recent weeks. We will get this thing fixed. We will continue to evaluate the program on a week-by-week basis. At the University of Kansas, we will never make complete evaluations until the season is complete and the body of work is in." Many local sports analysts interpreted that statement as Zenger officially putting head coach Turner Gill on the "hotseat" meaning he could be fired if things do not change. The day after losing KU's final game of the season to Missouri, Zenger fired Turner Gill who had a 5–19 record, 1–16 within the conference. Former Kansas City Chiefs offensive coordinator Notre Dame head coach Charlie Weis was hired to replace him on December 8.
