= 2011 Baylor Bears football team =

American college football season

2011 Baylor Bears football

Alamo Bowl champion

Alamo Bowl, W 67–56 vs. Washington
- Conference: Big 12 Conference

Ranking
- Coaches: No. 12
- AP: No. 13
- Record: 10–3 (6–3 Big 12)
- Head coach: Art Briles (4th season)
- Co-offensive coordinators: Randy Clements (4th season); Philip Montgomery (4th season)
- Offensive scheme: Veer and shoot
- Defensive coordinator: Phil Bennett (1st season)
- Base defense: 4–3
- Home stadium: Floyd Casey Stadium

2011 Big 12 Conference football standings
	Conf.			Overall
Team	W		L	W		L
No. 3 Oklahoma State $	8	–	1	12	–	1
No. 15 Kansas State	7	–	2	10	–	3
No. 13 Baylor	6	–	3	10	–	3
No. 16 Oklahoma	6	–	3	10	–	3
Missouri	5	–	4	8	–	5
Texas	4	–	5	8	–	5
Texas A&M	4	–	5	7	–	6
Iowa State	3	–	6	6	–	7
Texas Tech	2	–	7	5	–	7
Kansas	0	–	9	2	–	10
$ – BCS representative as conference champion; Rankings from AP Poll

The 2011 Baylor Bears football team represented Baylor University in the 2011 NCAA Division I FBS football season. The team was coached by Art Briles and played their home games at Floyd Casey Stadium in Waco, Texas. They are members of the Big 12 Conference. They finished the season 10–3, 6–3 in Big 12 play to finish in a tie for third place with Oklahoma (whom they defeated during the season). The ten wins tied a school record for wins in a season while the 6–3 conference record was its best since joining the Big 12. They were invited to the Alamo Bowl where they beat Washington, 67–56, for their first bowl win since the 1992 John Hancock Bowl.

Junior starting quarterback Robert Griffin III won the Heisman Trophy, becoming the first Baylor player to win the award.

== Recruiting ==
Baylor's recruiting class was ranked #46 by Rivals.com and #50 by Scout.com.

== Regular season ==
Building on the success of the previous year's team, Baylor began the season at home with a 50–48 upset of then #14 TCU, winners of the previous season's Rose Bowl. The Bears won their next two games against Stephen F. Austin and Rice at home, before traveling to Kansas State where they lost a tightly contested game 35–36 to the greatly improved Bill Snyder-coached team. After defeating Iowa State 49–26 at home, the Bears finished October losing two straight on the road at Texas A&M and eventual conference champion Oklahoma State.

The Bears rebounded to finish the regular season with five straight victories including a Homecoming win over Missouri, a 31–30 overtime victory at Kansas in which Baylor tied a school record by overcoming a 21-point deficit in the 4th quarter, and the program's first win over then #5 Oklahoma on a 34-yard touchdown pass from Griffin to Terrance Williams with 8 seconds remaining in the game. Baylor concluded November in Dallas playing against Texas Tech in Cowboys Stadium; although Griffin left the game due to a concussion at the half, backup Nick Florence entered the game to lead the Bears to a 66–42 victory. Baylor's win over Texas Tech was their first since 1995.

The Bears finished the regular season at home with a 48–24 victory over then #22 Texas that propelled the team (9–3, 6–3 Big 12) to the Alamo Bowl with #12 and #15 BCS and AP rankings respectively. The victory also propelled quarterback Robert Griffin III to the top of the Heisman Trophy voting; he became the first Baylor player to win the award and the first Baylor player since Don Trull in 1963 to factor significantly in the voting.

== Schedule ==
Date	Time	Opponent	Rank	Site	TV	Result	Attendance
September 2	7:00 p.m.	No. 14 TCU*		Floyd Casey Stadium; Waco, TX	ESPN	W 50–48	43,753
September 17	6:00 p.m.	No. 19 (FCS) Stephen F. Austin*	No. 19	Floyd Casey Stadium; Waco, TX		W 48–0^{A}	43,090
September 24	6:00 p.m.	Rice*	No. 17	Floyd Casey Stadium; Waco, TX	FSN	W 56–31	40,088
October 1	2:30 p.m.	at Kansas State	No. 15	Bill Snyder Family Football Stadium; Manhattan, KS	ABC/ESPN	L 35–36	49,399
October 8	6:00 p.m.	Iowa State	No. 25	Floyd Casey Stadium; Waco, TX	FSN	W 49–26	41,625
October 15	11:00 a.m.	at No. 21 Texas A&M	No. 20	Kyle Field; College Station, TX (Battle of the Brazos)	FX	L 28–55	87,361
October 29	2:30 p.m.	at No. 3 Oklahoma State		Boone Pickens Stadium; Stillwater, OK	ABC/ESPN2	L 24–59	58,274
November 5	6:00 p.m.	Missouri^{†}		Floyd Casey Stadium; Waco, TX	FSN	W 42–39	40,194
November 12	1:00 p.m.	at Kansas		Memorial Stadium; Lawrence, KS		W 31–30 ^{OT}	35,188
November 19	7:00 p.m.	No. 5 Oklahoma	No. 25	Floyd Casey Stadium; Waco, TX	ABC/ESPN3	W 45–38	40,281
November 26	6:00 p.m.	vs. Texas Tech	No. 21	Cowboys Stadium; Arlington, TX (Texas Farm Bureau Insurance Shootout)	FSN	W 66–42	51,615
December 3	2:30 p.m.	No. 22 Texas	No. 19	Floyd Casey Stadium; Waco, TX (rivalry)	ABC	W 48–24	46,543
December 29	8:00 p.m.	vs. Washington*	No. 15	Alamodome; San Antonio, TX (Alamo Bowl)	ESPN	W 67–56	65,256
*Non-conference game; ^{†}Homecoming; Rankings from AP Poll released prior to the game; All times are in Central time

- ^AGame was called at the end of the 3rd quarter due to lightning.

== Game summaries ==
=== Missouri ===
Missouri at Baylor

Team	1	2	3	4	Total
Missouri	7	7	0	25	39
• Baylor	0	13	15	14	42

- Date: November 5
- Location: Floyd Casey Stadium, Waco, Texas
- Game start: 6:00 p.m. CDT
- Elapsed time: 3:45
- Game attendance: 40,194
- Referee: Greg Burks
- TV announcers (FSN): Joel Meyers (Play-by-play), Brian Baldinger (Color) & Jim Knox (Sideline)

Scoring summary
1	8:04	MU	Henry Josey 6-yard run (Trey Barrow kick)	MU 7–0
2	12:33	BAY	Terrance Williams 6-yard pass from Robert Griffin III (Aaron Jones kick)	Tied 7–7
2	3:38	MU	Henry Josey 2-yard run (Trey Barrow kick)	MU 14–7
2	0:01	BAY	Robert Griffin III 1-yard run (kick blocked)	MU 14–13
3	13:12	BAY	Terrance Williams 28-yard pass from Robert Griffin III (Robert Griffin III run)	BAY 21–14
3	1:24	BAY	Terrance Ganaway 38-yard run (Aaron Jones kick)	BAY 28–14
4	13:46	MU	Trey Barrow 30-yard field goal	BAY 28–17
4	8:22	BAY	Tevin Reese 68-yard pass from Robert Griffin III (Aaron Jones kick)	BAY 35–17
4	7:05	MU	Marcus Lucas 24-yard pass from James Franklin (Kendial Lawrence run)	BAY 35–25
4	6:53	BAY	Terrance Ganaway 80-yard run (Aaron Jones kick)	BAY 42–25
4	3:55	MU	T.J. Moe 17-yard pass from James Franklin (Trey Barrow kick)	BAY 42–32
4	1:59	MU	L'Damian Washington 15-yard pass from James Franklin (Trey Barrow kick)	BAY 42–39

=== Oklahoma ===
#5 Oklahoma at #22 Baylor

Team	1	2	3	4	Total
Oklahoma	3	7	14	14	38
• Baylor	3	14	14	14	45

- Date: November 19
- Location: Floyd Casey Stadium, Waco, Texas
- Game start: 7:00 p.m. CST
- Elapsed time: 3:49
- Game attendance: 40,281
- Referee: Mike Defee
- TV announcers (ABC/ESPN3): Joe Tessitore (Play-by-play), Matt Millen (Color) & Erin Andrews (Sideline)

Scoring summary
1	5:34	OU	Mike Hunnicutt 47-yard field goal	OU 3–0
1	1:09	BAY	Aaron Jones 34-yard field goal	Tied 3–3
2	7:14	BAY	Terrance Ganaway 15-yard run (Aaron Jones kick)	BAY 10–3
2	2:38	OU	Blake Bell 3-yard run (Mike Hunnicutt kick)	Tied 10–10
2	2:23	BAY	Tevin Reese 69-yard pass from Robert Griffin III (Aaron Jones kick)	BAY 17–10
3	13:13	OU	Trey Millard 5-yard run (Mike Hunnicutt kick)	Tied 17–17
3	11:11	OU	Blake Bell 1-yard run (Mike Hunnicutt kick)	OU 24–17
3	6:39	BAY	Kendall Wright 87-yard pass from Robert Griffin III (Aaron Jones kick)	Tied 24–24
3	1:15	BAY	Jordan Najvar 13-yard pass from Robert Griffin III (Aaron Jones kick)	BAY 31–24
4	12:49	BAY	Terrance Ganaway 11-yard run (Aaron Jones kick)	BAY 38–24
4	5:55	OU	Blake Bell 5-yard run (Mike Hunnicutt kick)	BAY 38–31
4	0:51	OU	Blake Bell 6-yard run (Mike Hunnicutt kick)	Tied 38–38
4	0:08	BAY	Terrance Williams 34-yard pass from Robert Griffin III (Aaron Jones kick)	BAY 45–38

Baylor's first victory over Oklahoma in school history.

=== Texas Tech ===
Texas Tech vs. #18 Baylor

Team	1	2	3	4	Total
Texas Tech	7	21	7	7	42
• Baylor	10	21	21	14	66

- Date: November 26
- Location: Cowboys Stadium, Arlington, Texas
- Game start: 6:00 p.m. CST
- Elapsed time: 3:44
- Game attendance: 51,615
- Referee: Randy Christal
- TV announcers (FSN): Bill Land (Play-by-play), Dave Lapham (Color) & Emily Jones (Sideline)

Scoring summary
1	11:13	BAY	Aaron Jones 28-yard field goal	BAY 3–0
1	6:57	BAY	Kendall Wright 33-yard pass from Robert Griffin III (Aaron Jones kick)	BAY 10–0
1	3:39	TT	Kenny Williams 5-yard run (Donnie Carona kick)	BAY 10–7
2	14:54	BAY	Robert Griffin III 4-yard run (Aaron Jones kick)	BAY 17–7
2	10:55	TT	Eric Ward 2-yard pass from Seth Doege (Donnie Carona kick)	BAY 17–14
2	8:40	BAY	Terrance Ganaway 4-yard run (Aaron Jones kick)	BAY 24–14
2	7:57	TT	Darrin Moore 43-yard pass from Jacob Karam (Donnie Carona kick)	BAY 24–21
2	1:36	BAY	Robert Griffin III 3-yard run (Aaron Jones kick)	BAY 31–21
2	0:14	TT	Kenny Williams 14-yard run (Donnie Carona kick)	BAY 31–28
3	10:09	BAY	Kendall Wright 46-yard pass from Nick Florence (Aaron Jones kick)	BAY 38–28
3	6:05	BAY	Terrance Williams 40-yard pass from Nick Florence (Aaron Jones kick)	BAY 45–28
3	2:26	BAY	Joe Williams 90-yard interception return (Aaron Jones kick)	BAY 52–28
3	0:14	TT	Kenny Williams 14-yard run (Donnie Carona kick)	BAY 52–35
4	14:03	TT	Eric Ward 33-yard pass from Seth Doege (Donnie Carona kick)	BAY 52–42
4	9:33	BAY	Nick Florence 1-yard run (Aaron Jones kick)	BAY 59–42
4	6:24	BAY	Terrance Ganaway 4-yard run (Aaron Jones kick)	BAY 66–42

Robert Griffin III was knocked out just before halftime with a concussion.

=== Texas ===
Texas at #19 Baylor

Team	1	2	3	4	Total
Texas	7	14	3	0	24
• Baylor	14	10	17	7	48

- Date: December 3
- Location: Floyd Casey Stadium, Waco, Texas
- Game start: 2:30 p.m. CST
- Elapsed time: 3:22
- Game attendance: 46,543
- Referee: Reggie Smith
- TV announcers (ABC): Sean McDonough (Play-by-play), Matt Millen (Color) & Samantha Steele (Sideline)

Scoring summary
1	14:38	BAY	Kendall Wright 59-yard pass from Robert Griffin III (Aaron Jones kick)	BAY 7–0
1	8:03	BAY	Terrance Ganaway 20-yard run (Aaron Jones kick)	BAY 14–0
1	0:33	TEX	Blaine Irby 2-yard pass from Case McCoy (Justin Tucker kick)	BAY 14–7
2	10:53	TEX	Luke Poehlmann 3-yard pass from Case McCoy (Justin Tucker kick)	Tied 14–14
2	7:40	TEX	Marquise Goodwin 80-yard pass from Case McCoy (Justin Tucker kick)	TEX 21–14
2	4:39	BAY	Aaron Jones 22-yard field goal	TEX 21–17
2	0:50	BAY	Robert Griffin III 2-yard run (Aaron Jones kick)	BAY 24–21
3	13:04	TEX	Justin Tucker 39-yard field goal	Tied 24–24
3	11:34	BAY	Terrance Ganaway 1-yard run (Aaron Jones kick)	BAY 31–24
3	7:21	BAY	Robert Griffin III 10-yard run (Aaron Jones kick)	BAY 38–24
3	1:18	BAY	Aaron Jones 40-yard field goal	BAY 41–24
4	7:43	BAY	Terrance Williams 39-yard pass from Robert Griffin III (Aaron Jones kick)	BAY 48–24

=== Alamo Bowl ===
Washington vs. #15 Baylor

Team	1	2	3	4	Total
Washington	7	28	14	7	56
• Baylor	21	3	29	14	67

- Date: December 29
- Location: Alamodome, San Antonio
- Game start: 8:00 p.m. CST
- Elapsed time: 3:41
- Game attendance: 65,256
- Referee: Ron Cherry
- TV announcers (ESPN): Dave Pasch (Play-by-play), Chris Spielman (Color) & Quint Kessenich (Sideline)

On December 4, 2011, Baylor accepted an invite to represent the Big-12 in the 2011 Alamo Bowl. Their opponents were the Washington Huskies of the Pac-12. The game was played at the Alamodome. The crowd of 65,256 represented the 5th largest attendance in the history of the bowl game. A very good showing since the highest ever attendance at an Alamo bowl was only 66,100 which was set several years before. The Bowl officials stated it was also the most exciting college football game ever witnessed at the Bowl.

The contest became the second-highest scoring bowl game in history, and the highest-scoring regulation bowl game ever. Baylor went up 21–7 early in the game, with Griffin throwing for one touchdown and rushing for another. The Huskies roared back with 28 unanswered points, and the teams finished the half with Washington leading 35–24. In the second half, with the defenses showing limited ability to cope with the high-powered offenses led by Griffin and Husky QB Keith Price, the teams traded scores. The Bears overcame the halftime deficit, going ahead for good 60–56 halfway in the 4th quarter, and Baylor RB Terrance Ganaway tacked on a final 43-yard touchdown run with 2:28 left to play. Ganaway finished with 21 carries for 200 yards and 5 TDs, and was recognized as the game's offensive MVP. The victory represented Baylor's first bowl win since a victory in the John Hancock (Sun) Bowl in 1992. With the win, Baylor had their first 10-win season since 1980.

== Awards and honors ==
- Davey O'Brien Award: Robert Griffin III
- Heisman Trophy: Robert Griffin III
- AP Player of the Year: Robert Griffin III
- Sporting News Player of the Year: Robert Griffin III

== Rankings ==
Ranking movements Legend: ██ Increase in ranking ██ Decrease in ranking — = Not ranked RV = Received votes
	Week															
Poll	Pre	1	2	3	4	5	6	7	8	9	10	11	12	13	14	Final
AP	—	20	19	17	15	25	20	RV	RV	—	RV	25	21	19	15	13
Coaches	—	RV	24	19	16	RV	24	RV	RV	—	RV	RV	20	18	16	12
Harris	Not released						21	RV	RV	—	RV	25	20	18	16	Not released
BCS	Not released							—	—	—	25	22	18	17	12	Not released
