= 2011 Texas Longhorns football team =

American college football season

2011 Texas Longhorns football

Holiday Bowl champion

Holiday Bowl, W 21–10 vs. California
- Conference: Big 12 Conference
- Record: 8–5 (4–5 Big 12)
- Head coach: Mack Brown (14th season)
- Co-offensive coordinators: Major Applewhite (1st season); Bryan Harsin (1st season)
- Offensive scheme: Multiple
- Defensive coordinator: Manny Diaz (1st season)
- Base defense: 4–3
- Home stadium: Darrell K Royal–Texas Memorial Stadium

2011 Big 12 Conference football standings
	Conf.			Overall
Team	W		L	W		L
No. 3 Oklahoma State $	8	–	1	12	–	1
No. 15 Kansas State	7	–	2	10	–	3
No. 13 Baylor	6	–	3	10	–	3
No. 16 Oklahoma	6	–	3	10	–	3
Missouri	5	–	4	8	–	5
Texas	4	–	5	8	–	5
Texas A&M	4	–	5	7	–	6
Iowa State	3	–	6	6	–	7
Texas Tech	2	–	7	5	–	7
Kansas	0	–	9	2	–	10
$ – BCS representative as conference champion; Rankings from AP Poll

The 2011 Texas Longhorns football team (variously "Texas," "UT," the "Longhorns," or the "'Horns") represented the University of Texas at Austin in the 2011 NCAA Division I FBS football season. The Longhorns were led by 14th year head coach Mack Brown and played their home games at Darrell K Royal–Texas Memorial Stadium. They are a member of the Big 12 Conference. They finished the season 8–5, 4–5 in Big 12 play to finish in a tie for sixth place improving on their disastrous 5–7 season from 2010. They were invited to the Holiday Bowl where they defeated California 21–10.

== Previous season ==
After the 2009 Texas Longhorns football team lost to Alabama in the 2010 BCS National Championship Game, Texas entered the 2010 NCAA Division I FBS football season ranked fifth in the AP Poll and fourth in the Coaches Poll. Texas won its first three games of the season, maintaining a top 10 status. However, the Longhorns were upset by UCLA, followed by a loss to Oklahoma. This caused Texas to be excluded from both Top 25 polls for the first time since 1998.

=== 2011 NFL draft ===
==== 2011 NFL draft class ====
2011 NFL draft selections
Round	Pick #	Team	Player	Position
2	4	Buffalo Bills	Aaron Williams	Cornerback
3	31	Pittsburgh Steelers	Curtis Brown	Cornerback
4	6	Arizona Cardinals	Sam Acho	Defensive End
5	33	Baltimore Ravens	Chykie Brown	Cornerback

=== Other signed seniors ===
Eddie Jones (Linebacker) – New York Jets

John Gold (Punter) – Seattle Seahawks

John Chiles (wide receiver) – Jacksonville Sharks

Justin Tucker (Placekicker) – Baltimore Ravens

== Roster ==
2011 Texas Longhorns football team roster
Players
Coaches
Offense

Pos.	#	Name	Class
WR	1	Mike Davis	So
RB	2	Foswhitt Whittaker (injured)	Sr
WR	3	DeSean Hales	Jr
WR	4	Darius White	So
RB	5	Jeremy Hills	Jr
QB	6	Case McCoy	So
WR	8	Jaxon Shipley	Fr
WR	9	John Harris	Fr
RB	11	Cody Johnson	Sr
QB	14	David Ash	Fr
TE	15	Darius Terrell	Fr
WR	16	Bryant Jackson	Fr
TE	18	D.J. Grant	Jr
QB	19	John Paul Floyd	Sr
TE	19	Blaine Irby	Sr
RB	23	Eddie Aboussie	Fr
RB	24	Joe Bergeron	Fr
RB	26	D.J. Monroe	Jr
RB	28	Malcolm Brown	Fr
WR	29	Jaren Nickleson	So
FB	30	Ryan Roberson	Jr
WR	36	Michael Wheeler	Fr
WR	40	Tate Gresham	Fr
FB	41	Jamison Berryhill	Sr
WR	42	Dakota Haines	Fr
RB	43	Heath Hohmann	Fr
RB	45	Luke Padgett	Sr
G	54	Mark Buchanan	Sr
G, C	54	Dominic Espinosa	Fr
OL	55	Nick Zajicek	Sr
G, C	56	Tray Allen	Sr
OL	65	Marcus Hutchins	Fr
OL	66	Sedrick Flowers	Fr
OL	68	Josh Cochran	Fr
OL	68	Ryan Rodriguez	Fr
OL	69	Kyle Kreigel	So
OT	70	Paden Kelley	So
OL	71	Drew Russo	Fr
G	72	Mason Walters	So
G, C	73	Garrett Porter	So
OL	74	Taylor Doyle	Fr
G	75	Trey Hopkins	So
OL	76	Garrett Greenlea	Fr
C	78	David Snow	Sr
G	79	Thomas Ashcraft	So
TE	80	Jackson Crawly	Jr
WR	81	Miles Onyegbule	Fr
TE	82	Trey Graham	So
WR	82	Will Johnson	Fr
OT	82	Luke Poehlmann	Jr
WR	84	Marquise Goodwin	Jr
TE	85	Ahmard Howard	Sr
WR	86	Cade McCrary	So
TE	87	Dominique Jones	So
WR	87	Patrick McNamara	Sr
TE	88	M.J. McFarland	Fr
TE	89	Barrett Matthews	Jr

Defense

Pos.	#	Name	Class
LB	1	Keenan Robinson	Sr
CB	2	A.J. White	So
LB	3	Jordan Hicks	So
CB	4	Eryon Barnett	So
S	4	Kenny Vaccaro	Jr
LB	5	Aaron Benson	Fr
S	6	Christian Scott	Sr
S	7	Nolan Brewster	Sr
DB	7	Mykkele Thompson	Fr
LB, DE	9	Dravannti Johnson	Jr
LB	13	Chet Moss	Fr
LB	15	Demarco Cobbs	So
CB	17	Adrian Phillips	So
LB	18	Emmanuel Acho	Sr
S	21	Blake Gideon	Sr
CB	23	Carrington Byndom	So
DB	24	Sam Walker	Sr
DB	25	Josh Turner	Fr
CB	27	Josh Richardson	Jr
CB	28	Quandre Diggs	Fr
DB	29	Sheroid Evans	Fr
CB	30	Ryan Roberts	Fr
DB	31	Leroy Scott	Fr
S	32	Devin Huffines	So
LB	33	Steve Edmond	Fr
DB	35	Anthony D'Addeo	Sr
LB	35	Kendall Thompson	Fr
S	37	Nate Boyer	Fr
DB	38	Ben George	Fr
DB	39	Christian Randolph	Sr
S	40	Matthew Zapata	Fr
DB	43	Roderick Mayberry	Fr
DE	43	Logan Mills	Fr
DE	44	Jackson Jeffcoat	So
LB	46	Brad Terry	Jr
DE	47	Chris Terry	So
LB	48	Trey Gonzales	Fr
DE, DS	50	Michael Cruciani	Jr
DL	52	Luciano Martinez	Sr
DE	57	Taylor Silguero	So
LB	58	Cody Ramirez	Jr
DT	75	De'Aires Cotton	Fr
DE	80	Alex Okafor	Jr
DE	83	Trevor Leeson	Fr
DT	85	Ashton Dorsey	So
DE	88	Cedric Reed	Fr
DT	90	Calvin Howell	So
DT	91	Kheeston Randall	Sr
DE	92	Reggie Wilson	So
DT	94	Taylor Bible	Fr
DT	95	Greg Daniels	Fr
DE	96	Chris Whaley	So
DL	99	Desmond Jackson	Fr

Special teams

Pos.	#	Name	Class
P, PK	14	William Russ	Fr
PK, P	19	Justin Tucker	Sr
PK	31	Ben Pruitt	Fr
PK	33	Grant Sirgo	Fr
DS	39	Tom Newman	Fr
DS	48	Alex Zumberge	Sr
DS	49	Trey Weir	Sr
DS	59	John Osborn	Sr

Head coach

- Mack Brown (14th season)

Coordinators/assistant coaches

- Duane Akina – Assistant Head Coach/defensive backs
- Major Applewhite – Co-offensive Coordinator/running backs
- Bruce Chambers – Co-Recruiting Coordinator/tight ends
- Bo Davis – Defensive tackles
- Manny Diaz – Defensive coordinator/linebackers
- Oscar Giles – Assistant Coach/Defensive Ends
- Bryan Harsin – Co-offensive Coordinator/quarterbacks
- Stacy Searels – Offensive line
- Darrell Wyatt – Co-Recruiting Coordinator/wide receivers
- Jeff Madden – Assistant A.D. for Strength & Conditioning
- Bennie Wylie – Strength and Conditioning Head Coach for Football
- Arthur Johnson – Assistant Athletics Director for Football Operations
- Ken Rucker – Dir. of High School Relations and Player Development
- Marcus Tubbs – Special assistant for Player Relations
- Tom Kaufman – Defensive quality control

Legend

- (C) Team captain
- (S) Suspended
- (I) Ineligible
- Injured
- Redshirt

Roster
Last update: November 26, 2011

=== Recruiting ===
During the 2011 recruiting period, Texas recruited 18 players, including nine from the ESPN 150. As a result, Texas' recruiting class was ranked first by ESPN and third by both Rivals and Scout.

College recruiting (2011)
Name	Hometown	School	Height	Weight	40^{‡}	Commit date
Johnathan Gray; RB	Aledo, TX	Aledo HS	5 ft 10 in (1.78 m)	190 lb (86 kg)	4.4	Apr 22, 2011
Johnathan Gray; RB	Recruit ratings: Scout: Rivals: (85)					
Malcom Brown; DT	Brenham, TX	Brenham HS	6 ft 2 in (1.88 m)	280 lb (130 kg)	–	Apr 3, 2011
Malcom Brown; DT	Recruit ratings: Scout: Rivals: (83)					
Cayleb Jones; WR	Austin, TX	Austin HS	6 ft 2 in (1.88 m)	195 lb (88 kg)	4.5	Feb 27, 2011
Cayleb Jones; WR	Recruit ratings: Scout: Rivals: (83)					
Connor Brewer; QB	Scottsdale, AZ	Chaparral HS	6 ft 2 in (1.88 m)	190 lb (86 kg)	4.7	Feb 7, 2011
Connor Brewer; QB	Recruit ratings: Scout: Rivals: (82)					
Thomas Johnson; WR	Dallas, TX	Skyline HS	6 ft 0 in (1.83 m)	180 lb (82 kg)	4.4	Feb 22, 2011
Thomas Johnson; WR	Recruit ratings: Scout: Rivals: (82)					
Kennedy Estelle; OT	Pearland, TX	Glenda Dawson HS	6 ft 6 in (1.98 m)	310 lb (140 kg)	5.2	Jun 5, 2011
Kennedy Estelle; OT	Recruit ratings: Scout: Rivals: (82)					
Peter Jinkens; OLB	Dallas, TX	Skyline HS	6 ft 1 in (1.85 m)	210 lb (95 kg)	4.5	Feb 26, 2011
Peter Jinkens; OLB	Recruit ratings: Scout: Rivals: (81)					
Bryson Echols; CB	DeSoto, TX	DeSoto HS	5 ft 9 in (1.75 m)	165 lb (75 kg)	–	Feb 26, 2011
Bryson Echols; CB	Recruit ratings: Scout: Rivals: (81)					
Alex Norman; DT	Dallas, TX	Bishop Dunne HS	6 ft 3 in (1.91 m)	280 lb (130 kg)	–	Feb 12, 2011
Alex Norman; DT	Recruit ratings: Scout: Rivals: (80)					
Curtis Riser; OG	DeSoto, TX	DeSoto HS	6 ft 4 in (1.93 m)	290 lb (130 kg)	–	Feb 13, 2011
Curtis Riser; OG	Recruit ratings: Scout: Rivals: (80)					
Overall recruit ranking: Scout: 3 Rivals: 3 ESPN: 1
‡ Refers to 40-yard dash; Note: In many cases, Scout, Rivals, 247Sports, On3, and ESPN may conflict in their listings of height, weight and 40 time.; In these cases, the average was taken. ESPN grades are on a 100-point scale.; Sources: "Texas Football Commitment List 2012". Rivals.; "Texas College Football Recruiting Commits 2012". Scout.; "Texas Longhorns Commits 2012". ESPN.; "Scout.com Team Recruiting Rankings". Scout.; "2011 Team Ranking". Rivals.com.

== Schedule ==
Date	Time	Opponent	Rank	Site	TV	Result	Attendance
September 3	7:00 p.m.	Rice*		Darrell K Royal–Texas Memorial Stadium; Austin, TX (rivalry)	LHN	W 34–9	101,624 (Note: Denotes the largest crowd to watch a football game at Darrell K Royal–Texas Memorial Stadium (beating a previous record set during the 2010 Texas Longhorns season against the UCLA Bruins). The record would be topped on October 6, 2012 with a crowd of 101,851 vs West Virginia.)
September 10	6:00 p.m.	BYU*^{†}	No. 24	Darrell K Royal–Texas Memorial Stadium; Austin, TX	ESPN2	W 17–16	100,995
September 17	2:30 p.m.	at UCLA*	No. 23	Rose Bowl; Pasadena, CA	ABC/ESPN	W 49–20	54,583
October 1	6:00 p.m.	at Iowa State	No. 17	Jack Trice Stadium; Ames, IA	FX	W 37–14	56,390
October 8	11:00 a.m.	vs. No. 3 Oklahoma	No. 11	Cotton Bowl; Dallas, TX (Red River Rivalry, College GameDay)	ABC	L 17–55	96,009
October 15	2:30 p.m.	No. 6 Oklahoma State	No. 22	Darrell K Royal–Texas Memorial Stadium; Austin, TX	ABC/ESPN	L 26–38	100,101
October 29	6:00 p.m.	Kansas		Darrell K Royal–Texas Memorial Stadium; Austin, TX	LHN	W 43–0	99,211
November 5	11:00 a.m.	Texas Tech		Darrell K Royal–Texas Memorial Stadium; Austin, TX (Chancellor's Spurs)	FX	W 52–20	100,506
November 12	11:00 a.m.	at Missouri	No. 21	Faurot Field; Columbia, MO	FX	L 5–17	61,323
November 19	7:00 p.m.	No. 16 Kansas State		Darrell K Royal–Texas Memorial Stadium; Austin, TX	FX	L 13–17	100,705
November 24	7:00 p.m.	at Texas A&M	No. 25	Kyle Field; College Station, TX (rivalry)	ESPN	W 27–25	88,645
December 3	2:30 p.m.	at No. 19 Baylor	No. 22	Floyd Casey Stadium; Waco, TX (rivalry)	ABC	L 24–48	46,543
December 28	7:00 p.m.	vs. California*		Qualcomm Stadium; San Diego, CA (Holiday Bowl)	ESPN	W 21–10	56,313
*Non-conference game; ^{†}Homecoming; Rankings from AP Poll released prior to the game; All times are in Central time

== Game summaries ==
=== Rice ===
Rice at #24 Texas

Team	1	2	3	4	Total
Rice	3	3	3	0	9
• #24 Texas	3	10	7	14	34

- Date: September 3
- Location: Darrell K Royal–Texas Memorial Stadium, Austin, TX
- Game start: 7:08 pm CDT
- Elapsed time: 3:18
- Game attendance: 101,624
- Game weather: 100 °F (38 °C), sunny, winds NNE 15 mph
- Referee: Cooper Castleberry
- TV announcers (LHN): Mark Jones (Play-by-play), Ed Cunningham (Color) & Samantha Steele (Sideline)

Scoring summary
1	7:35	RICE	Chris Boswell 42-yard field goal	RICE 3–0
1	4:31	TEX	Justin Tucker 39-yard field goal	Tied 3–3
2	14:19	TEX	Cody Johnson 1-yard run (Justin Tucker kick)	TEX 10–3
2	6:00	TEX	Justin Tucker 23-yard field goal	TEX 13–3
2	0:56	RICE	Chris Boswell 49-yard field goal	TEX 13–6
3	9:07	RICE	Chris Boswell 26-yard field goal	TEX 13–9
3	5:32	TEX	Jaxon Shipley 36-yard pass from John Harris (Justin Tucker kick)	TEX 20–9
4	13:06	TEX	Foswhitt Whittaker 7-yard run (John Tucker kick)	TEX 27–9
4	5:57	TEX	Foswhitt Whittaker 26-yard pass from Garrett Gilbert (Justin Tucker kick)	TEX 34–9

Texas was favored by 24 points.

The Longhorns opened up the 2011 season against the Rice Owls of Conference USA. In the previous meeting, which was also the first game that 2010 Texas Longhorns football team played against, Texas won 34–17. Garrett Gilbert was the starting quarterback after he was selected over Case McCoy, David Ash, and Connor Wood. Rice was able to hold the Longhorns to a three-and-out and attain a field goal to give Rice a 3–0 lead. However, Texas was able to respond with another field goal drive which was highlighted by a 56-yard pass from Gilbert to Mike Davis that would turn out to be the longest pass for the game, tying it at 3–3 at the end of the first quarter. In the second quarter, Rice's Xavier Webb fumbled a punt that was recovered by the Texas team deep inside the Owls' side of the field, setting up the first touchdown of the game and putting Texas at a 10–3 lead. Each team made an additional field goal in the remaining second quarter to put the score at 13–6 with Texas leading.

To start the second half, the Owls were able to narrow the Longhorns' lead to 13–9 after driving 46 yards to make a field goal, but on the ensuing drive Texas was able to increase the lead once again with a touchdown highlighted by a 36-yard pass by John Harris to Jaxon Shipley. This marked the first time that a non-quarterback player made a touchdown pass in school history since 1998 Heisman Trophy winner Ricky Williams. In the fourth quarter, Texas held Rice scoreless while scoring two touchdowns, both of which by running back Foswhitt Whittaker. Texas would hold off Rice for the rest of the game to win 34–9 victory, the seventy-first against Rice overall.

=== BYU ===
BYU at #21 Texas

Team	1	2	3	4	Total
BYU	6	7	3	0	16
• #21 Texas	0	3	7	7	17

- Date: September 10
- Location: Darrell K Royal–Texas Memorial Stadium, Austin, TX
- Game start: 6:07 pm CDT
- Elapsed time: 3:06
- Game attendance: 100,995
- Game weather: 99 °F (37 °C), sunny, winds NNE 8 mph
- Referee: Dan Romeo
- TV announcers (ESPN2): Mark Jones (Play-by-play), Ed Cunningham (Color) & Samantha Steele (Sideline)

Texas was favored by 8 points.

Texas remained at home to face BYU. Prior to the game, the two teams had only met twice, in 1988 and 1987. In both games, BYU won with scores of 47–6 and 22–17, respectively. In the first quarter, BYU held Texas scoreless with two punts, answering with two field goals. Garrett Gilbert, the starting quarterback, was replaced by backups Case McCoy and David Ash in the first quarter after throwing two interceptions. To answer Gilbert's second interception, the Cougars were able to drive 97 yards to score the only touchdown of the first half. After the touchdown, BYU lead Texas 13–0. In the second quarter, BYU quarterback Jake Heaps was intercepted by Texas cornerback Adrian Phillips. This set up a Texas field goal that would be Texas' first score of the game with 1:44 left in the half, cutting the BYU lead to 10 points. The Cougars would keep possession for the remaining second quarter to keep the score at 13–3 at halftime, with BYU still leading. But against all odds, the Texas Longhorns stunned the BYU Cougars by means of a last minute touchdown and earning the victory as a result.

Scoring summary

Quarter	Time	Drive			Team	Scoring information	Score	
Quarter	Time	Plays	Yards	TOP	Team	Scoring information	BYU	Texas
1	9:33	10	45	4:02	BYU	30-yard field goal by Justin Sorensen	3	0
1	6:45	5	21	1:49	BYU	33-yard field goal by Justin Sorensen	6	0
2	11:41	12	97	5:04	BYU	Ross Apo 6-yard touchdown reception from Jake Heaps, Justin Sorensen kick good	13	0
2	1:44	7	19	3:15	Texas	23-yard field goal by Justin Tucker	13	3
3	10:46	7	62	2:42	Texas	Cody Johnson 1-yard touchdown run, Justin Tucker kick good	13	10
3	4:36	12	56	6:02	BYU	32-yard field goal by Justin Sorensen	16	10
4	8:46	8	52	3:18	Texas	Cody Johnson 1-yard touchdown run, Justin Tucker kick good	16	17
"TOP" = time of possession. For other American football terms, see Glossary of American football.							16	17

=== UCLA ===
#21 Texas at UCLA

Team	1	2	3	4	Total
• #21 Texas	14	14	14	7	49
UCLA	0	10	10	0	20

- Date: September 17
- Location: Rose Bowl, Pasadena, CA
- Game start: 2:42 pm CDT
- Elapsed time: 3:09
- Game attendance: 54,583
- Game weather: 81 °F (27 °C), partly cloudy, winds S 2 mph
- Referee: Randy Christal
- TV announcers (ABC/ESPN): Bob Wischusen (Play-by-play), Bob Davie & Samantha Steele (Sideline)

Scoring summary
1	11:20	TEX	D.J. Grant 45-yard pass from Case McCoy (Justin Tucker kick)	TEX 7–0
1	1:56	TEX	Foswhitt Whittaker 8-yard run (Justin Tucker kick)	TEX 14–0
2	11:36	TEX	Malcolm Brown 16-yard run (Justin Tucker kick)	TEX 21–0
2	6:49	UCLA	Derrick Coleman 1-yard run (Jeff Locke kick)	TEX 21–7
2	0:21	TEX	D.J. Grant 2-yard pass from Case McCoy (Justin Tucker kick)	TEX 28–7
2	0:00	UCLA	Jeff Locke 51-yard field goal	TEX 28–10
3	12:39	UCLA	Jeff Locke 49-yard field goal	TEX 28–13
3	9:38	TEX	D.J. Grant 5-yard pass from Jaxon Shipley (Justin Tucker kick)	TEX 35–13
3	4:29	UCLA	Derrick Coleman 1-yard run (Jeff Locke kick)	TEX 35–20
3	1:40	TEX	Foswhitt Whittaker 36-yard run (Justin Tucker kick)	TEX 42–20
4	2:57	TEX	Cody Johnson 7-yard run (Justin Tucker kick)	TEX 49–20

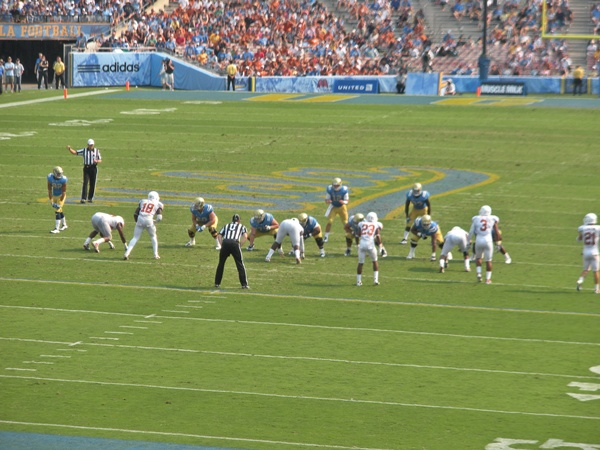
The Texas Longhorns defense lines up against UCLA in the Rose Bowl

Texas was favored by 4 points.

The Longhorns played UCLA for their first away game on September 17. In the previous 3 matches, UCLA won in large blowouts, most notably in 1997 when they won 66–3 in what became known as 'Rout 66.' Case McCoy and David Ash were selected as quarterback co-starters after Garrett Gilbert was taken out of the game against BYU. Texas started quickly into the game when UCLA quarterback Kevin Prince threw an interception. On the ensuing Longhorn drive, Case McCoy threw a 45-yard pass to D.J. Grant, giving Texas a 7–0 lead. Kevin Prince would throw 2 additional interceptions, both of which Texas scored upon, before taken out of the game.

=== Iowa State ===
#17 Texas at Iowa State

Team	1	2	3	4	Total
• #17 Texas	13	21	0	3	37
Iowa State	0	0	0	14	14

- Date: October 1
- Location: Jack Trice Stadium, Ames, IA
- Game start: 6:12 pm CDT
- Elapsed time: 3:35
- Game attendance: 56,390
- Game weather: 66°, clear skies, winds SE 0–5 mph
- Referee: Rick Loumiet
- TV announcers (FX): Gus Johnson (Play-by-play), Charles Davis (Color) & Tim Brewster (Sideline)

Scoring summary
1	7:30	TEX	Justin Tucker 33-yard field goal	TEX 3–0
1	5:35	TEX	Foswhitt Whittaker 16-yard run (Justin Tucker kick)	TEX 10–0
1	3:23	TEX	Justin Tucker 33-yard field goal	TEX 13–0
2	10:18	TEX	Mike Davis 48-yard pass from David Ash (Justin Tucker kick)	TEX 20–0
2	4:30	TEX	Josh Turner 34-yard blocked punt return (Justin Tucker kick)	TEX 27–0
2	1:17	TEX	Jaxon Shipley 40-yard pass from David Ash (Justin Tucker kick)	TEX 34–0
4	11:33	ISU	James White 2-yard run (Zach Guyer kick)	TEX 34–7
4	6:31	TEX	Justin Tucker 29-yard field goal	TEX 37–7
4	3:50	ISU	Chris Young 18 yad pass from Steele Jantz (Zach Guyer kick)	TEX 37–14

Texas was favored by 9 points.

=== Oklahoma ===
#1 Oklahoma vs. #10 Texas

Team	1	2	3	4	Total
• #1 Oklahoma	6	28	14	7	55
#10 Texas	3	7	0	7	17

- Date: October 8
- Location: Cotton Bowl, Dallas, TX
- Game start: 11:00 am CDT
- Elapsed time: 3:34
- Game attendance: 96,009
- Game weather: 78°, Mostly Cloudy with 75% Chance of Rain, winds SSE 15 mph
- Referee: Scott Novak
- TV announcers (ABC): Brent Musburger (Play-by-play), Kirk Herbstreit (Color), Erin Andrews (Sideline) & Tom Rinaldi (Sideline)

Oklahoma was favored by 11.5 points.

=== Oklahoma State ===
#7 Oklahoma State at No. 21 Texas

Team	1	2	3	4	Total
• #7 Oklahoma State	7	14	17	0	38
#21 Texas	0	10	14	2	26

- Date: October 15
- Location: Darrell K Royal–Texas Memorial Stadium, Austin, TX
- Game start: 2:33 pm CDT
- Elapsed time: 3:27
- Game attendance: 100,101
- Game weather: 83°, clear skies, winds S 8 mph
- Referee: Mike Defee
- TV announcers (ABC/ESPN): Sean McDonough (Play-by-play), Matt Millen (Color) & Samantha Steele (Sideline)

Oklahoma State was favored by 8 points.

=== Kansas ===
Kansas at Texas

Team	1	2	3	4	Total
Kansas	0	0	0	0	0
• Texas	14	12	7	10	43

- Date: October 29
- Location: Darrell K Royal–Texas Memorial Stadium, Austin, TX
- Game start: 6:06 pm CDT
- Elapsed time: 3:06
- Game attendance: 99,211
- Game weather: 66°, clear skies, winds S 3 mph
- Referee: Reggie Smith
- TV announcers (LHN): Dave LaMont (Play-by-play), Tim Brown (Color) & Samantha Steele (Sideline)

Texas was favored by 28.5 points.

=== Texas Tech ===
Texas Tech at No. 25 Texas

Team	1	2	3	4	Total
Texas Tech	3	3	7	7	20
• #25 Texas	3	28	7	14	52

- Date: November 5
- Location: Darrell K Royal–Texas Memorial Stadium, Austin, TX
- Game start: 11:11 am CDT
- Elapsed time: 3:10
- Game attendance: 100,506
- Game weather: 59°, Sunny, winds SSE 5mph
- Referee: Scott Novak
- TV announcers (FX): Gus Johnson, Charles Davis (Color) & Tim Brewster (Sideline)

Scoring summary
1	7:56	TT	Donnie Carona 29-yard field goal	TT 3–0
1	4:24	TEX	Justin Tucker 48-yard field goal	Tied 3–3
2	13:17	TEX	Foswhitt Whittaker 12-yard run (Justin Tucker kick)	TEX 10–3
2	10:10	TT	Donnie Carona 40-yard field goal	TEX 10–6
2	8:33	TEX	Foswhitt Whitaker 8-yard run (Justin Tucker kick)	TEX 17–6
2	6:56	TEX	D.J. Monroe 12-yard run (Justin Tucker kick)	TEX 24–6
2	1:46	TEX	Joe Bergeron 9-yard run (Justin Tucker kick)	TEX 31–6
3	9:06	TEX	Joe Bergeron 5-yard run (Justin Tucker kick)	TEX 38–6
3	3:10	TT	Eric Ward 8-yard pass from Seth Doege (Donnie Carona kick)	TEX 38–13
4	14:53	TEX	Joe Bergeron 12-yard run (Justin Tucker kick)	TEX 45–13
4	5:48	TEX	Darius White 31-yard pass from Case McCoy (Justin Tucker kick)	TEX 52–13
4	1:01	TT	Darrin Moore 1-yard pass from Seth Doege (Donnie Carona kick)	TEX 52–20

Texas was favored by 14 points.

=== Missouri ===
#20 Texas at Missouri

Team	1	2	3	4	Total
#20 Texas	3	0	2	0	5
• Missouri	0	14	3	0	17

- Date: November 12
- Location: Faurot Field, Columbia, MO
- Game start: 11:00 am CST
- Elapsed time: 3:08
- Game attendance: 61,323
- Game weather: 54°, Overcast, winds S 19mph
- Referee: Dan Romeo
- TV announcers (FX): Craig Bolerjack (Play-by-play), Joel Klatt (Color) & Petros Papadakis (Sideline)

Texas was favored by 1.5 points.

=== Kansas State ===
#17 Kansas State at Texas

Team	1	2	3	4	Total
• #17 Kansas State	3	7	7	0	17
Texas	0	3	7	3	13

- Date: November 19
- Location: Darrell K Royal–Texas Memorial Stadium, Austin, TX
- Game start: 7:12 pm CST
- Elapsed time: 3:06
- Game attendance: 100,705
- Game weather: 77°, Cloudy, winds SSE 13mph
- Referee: Cooper Castleberry
- TV announcers (FX): Gus Johnson (Play-by-play), Charles Davis (Color) & Tim Brewster (Sideline)

Texas was favored by 7.5 points.

=== Texas A&M ===
Texas at Texas A&M

Team	1	2	3	4	Total
• Texas	0	7	17	3	27
Texas A&M	10	6	0	9	25

- Date: November 24
- Location: Kyle Field, College Station, TX
- Game start: 7:10 pm CST
- Elapsed time: 3:48
- Game attendance: 88,645
- Game weather: 61°, Clear, winds E 7mph
- Referee: Scott Novak
- TV announcers (ESPN): Rece Davis (Play-by-play), Craig James (Color), Jesse Palmer (Color) & Jenn Brown (Sideline)

Scoring summary
1	11:31	A&M	Ben Malena 7-yard pass from Ryan Tannehill (Randy Bullock kick)	A&M 7–0
1	5:40	A&M	Randy Bullock 49-yard field goal	A&M 10–0
2	10:50	A&M	Randy Bullock 52-yard field goal	A&M 13–0
2	9:10	TEX	Blaine Irby 41-yard pass from Jaxon Shipley (Justin Tucker kick)	A&M 13–7
2	4:18	A&M	Randy Bullock 29-yard field goal	A&M 16–7
3	11:06	TEX	Carrington Byndom 58-yard interception return (Justin Tucker kick)	A&M 16–14
3	7:44	TEX	Justin Tucker 23-yard field goal	TEX 17–16
3	4:04	TEX	Cody Johnson 1-yard run (Justin Tucker kick)	TEX 24–16
4	5:56	A&M	Randy Bullock 32-yard field goal	TEX 24–19
4	1:48	A&M	Jeff Fuller 16-yard pass from Ryan Tannehill (pass failed)	A&M 25–24
4	0:00	TEX	Justin Tucker 40-yard field goal	TEX 27–25

Texas A&M was favored by 8 points.

=== Baylor ===
Texas at No. 18 Baylor

Team	1	2	3	4	Total
Texas	7	14	3	0	24
• #18 Baylor	14	10	17	7	48

- Date: December 3
- Location: Floyd Casey Stadium, Waco, TX
- Game start: 2:30 pm CST
- Elapsed time: 3:22
- Game attendance: 46,543
- Game weather: 66°, Cloudy w/ chance of rain, winds S 17mph
- Referee: Reggie Smith
- TV announcers (ABC): Sean McDonough (Play-by-play), Matt Millen (Color) & Samantha Steele (Sideline)

Baylor was favored by 3 points.

=== Holiday Bowl – California ===
2011 Holiday Bowl: Texas vs. California

Team	1	2	3	4	Total
California	3	0	7	0	10
• Texas	0	7	7	7	21

- Date: December 28
- Location: Qualcomm Stadium, San Diego, CA
- Game start: 7:11 pm CST
- Elapsed time: 3:32
- Game attendance: 56,313
- Game weather: 56°, Clear, winds NW 7mph
- Referee: Matt Moore
- TV announcers (ESPN): Rece Davis (Play-by-play), Jesse Palmer (Color) & Jenn Brown (Sideline)
Sources: ESPN

Scoring summary
1	6:06	CAL	Giorgio Tavecchio 47-yard field goal	CAL 3–0
2	6:08	TEX	David Ash 4-yard pass from Jaxon Shipley (Justin Tucker kick)	TEX 7–3
3	9:47	CAL	Isi Sofele 6-yard run (Giorgio Tavecchio kick)	CAL 10–7
3	8:06	TEX	Marquise Goodwin 47-yard pass from David Ash (Justin Tucker kick)	TEX 14–10
4	14:57	TEX	Cody Johnson 4-yard run (Justin Tucker kick)	TEX 21–10

Texas was favored by 3 points. Most valuable players were David Ash (QB) and Keenan Robinson (LB).

== Rankings ==
The Texas Longhorns began the season unranked for the first time since 1998 in the AP Poll, although it was ranked twenty-fourth in the Coaches Poll. After wins against Rice and BYU, Texas would slowly increase in the rankings before jumping four spots in the AP Poll and three in the Coaches Poll after winning against UCLA. After the bye week Texas once again jumped another 2 spots in the AP Poll and one in the Coaches Poll. In the final BCS rankings, Texas was twenty-fourth. In both the Associated Press' final rankings and USA Today's final rankings, Texas was unranked.

Ranking movements Legend: ██ Increase in ranking ██ Decrease in ranking — = Not ranked RV = Received votes
	Week															
Poll	Pre	1	2	3	4	5	6	7	8	9	10	11	12	13	14	Final
AP	RV	24	23	19	17	11	22	RV	RV	RV	21	RV	RV	RV	—	RV
Coaches	24	21	21	18	17	10	21	RV	RV	25	20	RV	RV	RV	—	RV
Harris	Not released						20	RV	25	24	20	RV	RV	25	RV	Not released
BCS	Not released							24	24	21	16	23	25	22	24	Not released
