= 2011 Texas A&M Aggies football team =

American college football season

2011 Texas A&M Aggies football

Meineke Car Care Bowl of Texas champion

Meineke Car Care Bowl of Texas, W 33–22 vs. Northwestern
- Conference: Big 12 Conference
- Record: 7–6 (4–5 Big 12)
- Head coach: Mike Sherman (4th season; regular season); Tim DeRuyter (interim; bowl game)
- Offensive scheme: Multiple pro-style
- Defensive coordinator: Tim DeRuyter (2nd season)
- Base defense: 3–4
- Captains: Trent Hunter; Ryan Tannehill
- Home stadium: Kyle Field

2011 Big 12 Conference football standings
	Conf.			Overall
Team	W		L	W		L
No. 3 Oklahoma State $	8	–	1	12	–	1
No. 15 Kansas State	7	–	2	10	–	3
No. 13 Baylor	6	–	3	10	–	3
No. 16 Oklahoma	6	–	3	10	–	3
Missouri	5	–	4	8	–	5
Texas	4	–	5	8	–	5
Texas A&M	4	–	5	7	–	6
Iowa State	3	–	6	6	–	7
Texas Tech	2	–	7	5	–	7
Kansas	0	–	9	2	–	10
$ – BCS representative as conference champion; Rankings from AP Poll

The 2011 Texas A&M Aggies football team represented Texas A&M University in the 2011 NCAA Division I FBS football season. The Aggies were led by fourth year head coach Mike Sherman during the regular season and Tim DeRuyter during their bowl game. They played their home games at Kyle Field. This was their final football season as a member of the Big 12 Conference. They finished the season 7–6, 4–5 in Big 12 play to finish in a tie for sixth place. They were invited to the Meineke Car Care Bowl of Texas where they defeated Northwestern 33–22.

Texas A&M sold out every home game during the season for the first time, setting new attendance records for total fans (610,283) and average fans per game (87,183) in the process. The sellouts were due in large part to speculation (later confirmed) that Texas A&M would become a member of the Southeastern Conference beginning in 2012.

A week after losing the rivalry game with Texas, on December 1, 2011, head coach Mike Sherman was fired by phone while on a recruiting trip in Houston, Texas. Defensive coordinator Tim DeRuyter was the interim head coach for their bowl game. Sherman finished at A&M with a four-year record of 25–25. Sherman was replaced by Kevin Sumlin while DeRuyter left A&M to become the head coach at Fresno State.

== Schedule ==
Date	Time	Opponent	Rank	Site	TV	Result	Attendance
September 4	6:30 pm	SMU*	No. 8	Kyle Field; College Station, TX	FSN	W 46–14	86,951
September 17	6:00 pm	Idaho*	No. 9	Kyle Field; College Station, TX	FSSW–PPV	W 37–7	86,623
September 24	2:30 pm	No. 7 Oklahoma State	No. 8	Kyle Field; College Station, TX	ABC/ESPN2	L 29–30	87,358
October 1	11:00 am	vs. No. 18 Arkansas*	No. 14	Cowboys Stadium; Arlington, TX (Southwest Classic)	ESPN	L 38–42	69,838
October 8	6:00 pm	at Texas Tech	No. 24	Jones AT&T Stadium; Lubbock, TX (rivalry)	FX	W 45–40	58,416
October 15	11:00 am	No. 20 Baylor	No. 21	Kyle Field; College Station, TX (Battle of the Brazos)	FX	W 55–28	87,361
October 22	2:30 pm	at Iowa State	No. 17	Jack Trice Stadium; Ames, IA	ABC	W 33–17	51,131
October 29	11:00 am	Missouri	No. 16	Kyle Field; College Station, TX	FX	L 31–38 ^{OT}	86,934
November 5	2:30 pm	at No. 7 Oklahoma		Gaylord Family Oklahoma Memorial Stadium; Norman, OK	ABC/ESPN2	L 25–41	85,709
November 12	2:30 pm	at No. 17 Kansas State		Bill Snyder Family Football Stadium; Manhattan, KS	ABC	L 50–53 ^{4OT}	46,204
November 19	11:00 am	Kansas		Kyle Field; College Station, TX	FSN	W 61–7	86,411
November 24	7:00 pm	No. 25 Texas		Kyle Field; College Station, TX (rivalry)	ESPN	L 25–27	88,645
December 31	11:00 am	vs. Northwestern*		Reliant Stadium; Houston, TX (Meineke Car Care Bowl of Texas)	ESPN	W 33–22	68,395
*Non-conference game; Rankings from AP Poll released prior to game; All times are in Central time

== Personnel ==
=== Roster ===
2011 Texas A&M Aggies football team roster
Players
Coaches
Offense

Pos.	#	Name	Class
QB	3	Jameill Showers	Fr
WR	4	Brandal Jackson	Jr
WR	5	Kenric McNeal	Jr
WR	7	Uzoma Nwachukwu	Jr
WR	8	Jeff Fuller	Sr
WR	9	Nate Askew	So
TE	13	Tommy Dorman	So
QB	13	Aaron Eike	Fr
WR	14	Keon Furtch	Jr
QB	15	Johnny Manziel	Fr
WR	16	David Adame	Jr
QB	16	Matt Joeckel	Fr
QB	17	Ryan Tannehill	Sr
QB	18	Patrick O'Quinn	So
TE	19	Michael Lamothe	Jr
RB	23	Ben Malena	So
WR	24	Taylor Randle	Sr
WR	25	Ryan Swope (C)	Jr
RB	27	Mister Jones	Fr
RB	32	Cyrus Gray	Sr
RB	33	Christine Michael	Jr
RB	34	Will Randolph	Fr
RB	35	Jay Tolliver	Jr
RB	37	Garrett Graham	Fr
RB	42	Byron Jones-Campbell	Jr
WR	44	Sam Moeller	Fr
TE	45	Matt Sherman	Jr
OL	51	Jarvis Harrison	Fr
OL	55	Chase Dube	So
OL	56	Ryan Liscum	Jr
OL	57	Dylan Guthrie	Fr
OL	59	Allen Woodum	Jr
OL	61	Patrick Lewis	Jr
OL	62	Jeffrey Hyde	So
OL	65	Evan Eike	Sr
OL	67	Joseph Villavisencio	Sr
OL	68	Ben Compton	Fr
OL	70	Cedric Ogbuehi	Fr
OL	71	Brian Thomas	Jr
OL	74	Danny Baker	Sr
OL	75	Jake Matthews	So
OL	76	Luke Joeckel	So
OL	77	Shep Klinke	So
OL	78	Garrett Gramling	Fr
OL	79	Joseph Cheek	Fr
TE	8o	Hutson Prioleau	So
TE	81	Nehemiah Hicks	So
WR	82	Mike Evans	Fr
WR	83	Michael Walker	Fr
WR	84	Malcome Kennedy	Fr
WR	85	LeKendrick Williams	Fr
WR	86	Seth Gardner	Jr
WR	87	Chance Nelson	Fr
WR	88	Gaston Lamascus	So
TE	89	Taylor Karrh	Fr
TE	90	Justin Breshears	Fr
TE	96	Caden Smith	Fr

Defense

Pos.	#	Name	Class
DB	1	Trent Hunter	Sr
DB	2	Steven Campbell	Jr
DB	3	Lionel Smith	Sr
DB	4	Toney Hurd Jr.	So
DB	5	Coryell Judie	Sr
DB	6	Desmond Gardiner	So
DB	7	Terrence Frederick	Sr
LB	8	Garrick Williams	Sr
LB	9	Charlie Thomas	So
LB	10	Sean Porter	Jr
LB	11	Jonathan Stewart	Jr
DB	14	Floyd Raven Sr.	Fr
DB	15	Travis Labhart	Jr
LB	18	Kyle Mangan	Jr
DB	19	Matt Fritsche	Fr
DB	20	C.J. Jones	Jr
DB	21	Steven Terrell (C)	Jr
DB	22	Dustin Harris	Jr
LB	23	Domonique Patterson	So
DB	24	Travis Arthur	Fr
DB	25	Clay Honeycutt	Fr
DB	26	Devonta Burns	Fr
DB	27	Michael Osadebey	So
DB	28	Louie Swope	Fr
DB	29	Deshazor Everett	Fr
DB	30	Johntel Franklin	Jr
DB	31	Howard Matthews	Fr
DB	32	Blaine Cheatham	Jr
DB	33	Deandre Thompson	Jr
LB	35	Tyrell Taylor	Fr
LB	36	Donnie Baggs	Fr
LB	37	Darzil Washington	Fr
LB	38	Kolten Thigpen	Sr
DL	39	Eddie Brown, Jr.	Sr
LB	40	Shaun Ward	Fr
LB	41	Brandon Alexander	Fr
DL	42	Kirby Ennis	So
LB	43	Justin Bass	Fr
LB	45	Steven Jenkins	So
LB	46	Jake Russell	Fr
JKR	47	Caleb Russell	Jr
LB	58	Cody Johnson	Fr
DL	72	Gavin Stansbury	Fr
DL	73	Rhontae Scales	So
DL	83	Tony Jerod-Eddie	Sr
DB	89	Rylan Riney	Fr
DL	89	Ivan Robinson	So
DL	90	Ben Bass	Sr
DL	92	Jonathan Mathis	Sr
JKR	94	Damontre Moore	So
DL	97	Stephen Barrera	So
DL	98	Shayvion Hatten	Fr
DL	99	Spencer Nealy	Jr

Special teams

Pos.	#	Name	Class
P	26	Ken Wood	Sr
PK	28	Randy Bullock	Sr
P	36	Jared Jaroszewski	Sr
P	38	Drew Kaser	Fr
P	48	Ryan Epperson	Jr
DS	50	Justin Ortega	Fr
DS	52	Shelby Trahan	Fr
PK	91	Taylor Bertolet	Fr
DS	95	Ben Bredthauer	Jr

Head coach

- Mike Sherman (4th season)

Coordinators/assistant coaches

- Tom Rossley – Quarterbacks
- Randy Jordan – Running backs
- Troy Walters – Wide receivers
- Jim Turner – Offensive line coach
- Tim Deruyter – Defensive coordinator/assistant head coach
- Charles McMillan – Defensive backs
- Dat Nguyen – Inside linebackers
- Terrell Williams – Defensive line
- Nick Toth – Outside linebackers
- Dave Kennedy – Strength and conditioning

Legend

- (C) Team captain
- (S) Suspended
- (I) Ineligible
- Injured
- Redshirt

== Rankings ==
Ranking movements Legend: ██ Increase in ranking ██ Decrease in ranking — = Not ranked RV = Received votes
	Week															
Poll	Pre	1	2	3	4	5	6	7	8	9	10	11	12	13	14	Final
AP	8	7	9	8	14	24	21	17	16	RV	—	—	—	—	—	—
Coaches	9	8	9	8	13	25	23	18	16	RV	RV	RV	RV	—	—	RV
Harris	Not released						23	19	17	RV	RV	—	—	—	—	Not released
BCS	Not released							17	16	—	—	—	—	—	—	Not released
