= 2011 Big 12 Conference football season =

American college football season

- League: NCAA Division I FBS (Football Bowl Subdivision)
- Sport: football
- Teams: 10
- TV partner(s): ABC, Fox Sports Net, ESPN, Versus, Fox College Sports

2012 NFL draft
- Top draft pick: Robert Griffin III (Baylor)
- Picked by: Washington Redskins, 2nd overall

Regular season
- Champion: Oklahoma State

Football seasons
- 2010 2012

2011 Big 12 Conference football standings
	Conf.			Overall
Team	W		L	W		L
No. 3 Oklahoma State $	8	–	1	12	–	1
No. 15 Kansas State	7	–	2	10	–	3
No. 13 Baylor	6	–	3	10	–	3
No. 16 Oklahoma	6	–	3	10	–	3
Missouri	5	–	4	8	–	5
Texas	4	–	5	8	–	5
Texas A&M	4	–	5	7	–	6
Iowa State	3	–	6	6	–	7
Texas Tech	2	–	7	5	–	7
Kansas	0	–	9	2	–	10
$ – BCS representative as conference champion; Rankings from AP Poll

The 2011 Big 12 Conference football season was the 16th season for the Big 12, as part of the 2011 NCAA Division I FBS football season. It had 10 football teams due to the departure of Colorado to the Pac-12 and Nebraska to the Big Ten. It was also the last Big 12 season for Texas A&M and Missouri, as both of them departed for the SEC in July 2012.

== Big 12 media poll ==
The Big 12 preseason prediction poll, as voted on by members of the media, was released on July 20, 2011.

Big 12
Predicted finish	Team	Votes (1st place)
1	Oklahoma	428 (41)
2	Texas A&M	362 (1)
3	Oklahoma State	360 (1)
4	Missouri	281
5	Texas	265
6	Baylor	194
7	Texas Tech	191
8	Kansas State	140
9	Iowa State	93
10	Kansas	51

== Rankings ==
Legend
Improvement in ranking
Drop in ranking
Not ranked previous week

		Pre	Wk 1	Wk 2	Wk 3	Wk 4	Wk 5	Wk 6	Wk 7	Wk 8	Wk 9	Wk 10	Wk 11	Wk 12	Wk 13	Wk 14	Final
Baylor	AP		20	19	17	15	25	20	RV	RV		RV	25	21	19	15	13
Baylor	C		RV	24	19	16	RV	24	RV	RV		RV	RV	20	18	16	12
Baylor	HAR	Not released						21	RV	RV		RV	25	20	18	16	
Baylor	BCS	Not released										25	22	18	17	12	
Iowa State	AP				RV	RV								RV			
Iowa State	C			RV	RV	RV								RV			
Iowa State	HAR	Not released												RV			
Iowa State	BCS	Not released															
Kansas	AP																
Kansas	C																
Kansas	HAR	Not released															
Kansas	BCS	Not released															
Kansas State	AP					RV	20	17	12	10	17	17	16	16	16	11	15
Kansas State	C					RV	21	18	16	12	19	22	17	15	15	10	16
Kansas State	HAR	Not released						17	12	10	15	18	17	15	15	10	
Kansas State	BCS	Not released							11	8	14	14	13	11	11	8	
Missouri	AP	21	21	RV	RV	RV									RV	RV	RV
Missouri	C	21	19	RV	RV								RV	RV	RV	RV	RV
Missouri	HAR	Not released							RV				RV	RV	RV	RV	
Missouri	BCS	Not released													25		
Oklahoma	AP	1	1	1	1	2	3	3	3	11	7	7	5	12	13	19	16
Oklahoma	C	1	1	1	1	1	1	1	1	9	7	7	5	11	11	19	15
Oklahoma	HAR	Not released						3	3	8	7	7	5	10	10	19	
Oklahoma	BCS	Not released							1	9	6	6	5	9	9	14	
Oklahoma State	AP	9	9	8	7	5	6	6	6	3	3	2	2	5	3	3	3
Oklahoma State	C	8	7	7	6	6	7	7	6	4	4	3	2	6	5	3	3
Oklahoma State	HAR	Not released						6	6	3	3	2	2	6	5	3	
Oklahoma State	BCS	Not released							4	3	3	2	2	4	3	3	
Texas	AP	RV	24	23	19	17	11	22	RV	RV	RV	21	RV		RV		RV
Texas	C	24	21	21	18	17	10	21	RV	RV	25	20	RV	RV	RV	RV	RV
Texas	HAR	Not released						20	RV	25	24	20	RV	RV	25		
Texas	BCS	Not released							24	24	21	16	23	25	22	24	
Texas A&M	AP	8	7	9	8	14	24	21	17	16	RV						
Texas A&M	C	9	8	9	8	13	25	23	18	16	RV	RV	RV	RV			RV
Texas A&M	HAR	Not released						23	19	17	RV	RV					
Texas A&M	BCS	Not released							17	16							
Texas Tech	AP						RV	RV		19							
Texas Tech	C		RV		RV	RV	RV	RV		22							
Texas Tech	HAR	Not released						RV	RV	21	RV						
Texas Tech	BCS	Not released								20							
