= Frank Alexander (American football) =

American gridiron football player (born 1989)

No. 90, 96, 57
- Position: Defensive end

Personal information
- Born: December 17, 1989 (age 36); Zachary, Louisiana, U.S.
- Listed height: 6 ft 4 in (1.93 m)
- Listed weight: 260 lb (118 kg)

Career information
- High school: Southern University Laboratory School (Baton Rouge, Louisiana)
- College: Oklahoma
- NFL draft: 2012: 4th round, 103rd overall pick

Career history
- Carolina Panthers (2012–2015); BC Lions (2017)*; Dallas Renegades (2020)
- * Offseason or practice squad member only

Awards and highlights
- Second-team All-American (2011); First-team All-Big 12 (2011)

Career NFL statistics
- Total tackles: 34
- Sacks: 3.5
- Fumble recoveries: 3
- Stats at Pro Football Reference

Frank Alexander (born December 17, 1989) is an American former professional football player who was a defensive end for the Carolina Panthers of the National Football League (NFL). He played college football for the Oklahoma Sooners. He was selected by the Panthers in the fourth round of the 2012 NFL draft.

== Professional career ==
=== Carolina Panthers ===
Alexander was selected by the Carolina Panthers in the fourth round, with the 103rd overall pick, of the 2012 NFL draft. He made his NFL debut in Week 1 against the Tampa Bay Buccaneers as a backup defensive end.

On May 5, 2014, Alexander was suspended 4 games for violating the NFL's substance abuse policy. Shortly before that suspension was scheduled to end, he was suspended for 10 more games for another violation.

In the second preseason game against the Miami Dolphins, Alexander suffered a torn Achilles tendon. He was waived/injured on August 25, 2015. He cleared waivers and was reverted to the Panthers' injured reserve list. On November 24, 2015, the NFL announced that Alexander would be suspended for a year for his third violation with marijuana.

In the 2015 season, Alexander's Panthers reached Super Bowl 50 on February 7, 2016. The Panthers fell to the Denver Broncos by a score of 24–10.

=== BC Lions ===
On March 7, 2017, Alexander and the BC Lions of the Canadian Football League agreed to a contract. He was placed on the reserve/suspended list on June 9. He was released on November 7, 2017, before ever playing for the Lions.

=== Dallas Renegades ===
In 2019, Alexander was selected by the Dallas Renegades in the 2020 XFL draft. He had his contract terminated when the league suspended operations on April 10, 2020.

== NFL statistics ==
Year	Team	GP	GS	Tackles					Interceptions						Fumbles	
Year	Team	GP	GS	Comb	Total	Ast	Sck	SFTY	PDef	Int	Yds	Avg	Lng	TDs	FF	FR
2012	CAR	16	3	18	10	8	2.5	0	3	0	0	0	0	0	0	2
2013	CAR	12	3	15	9	6	1	0	2	0	0	0	0	0	0	0
2014	CAR	1	0	1	1	0	0	0	0	0	0	0	0	0	0	0
Total		29	6	34	20	14	3.5	0	5	0	0	0	0	0	0	2
