= Donald Stephenson =

American football player (born 1988)

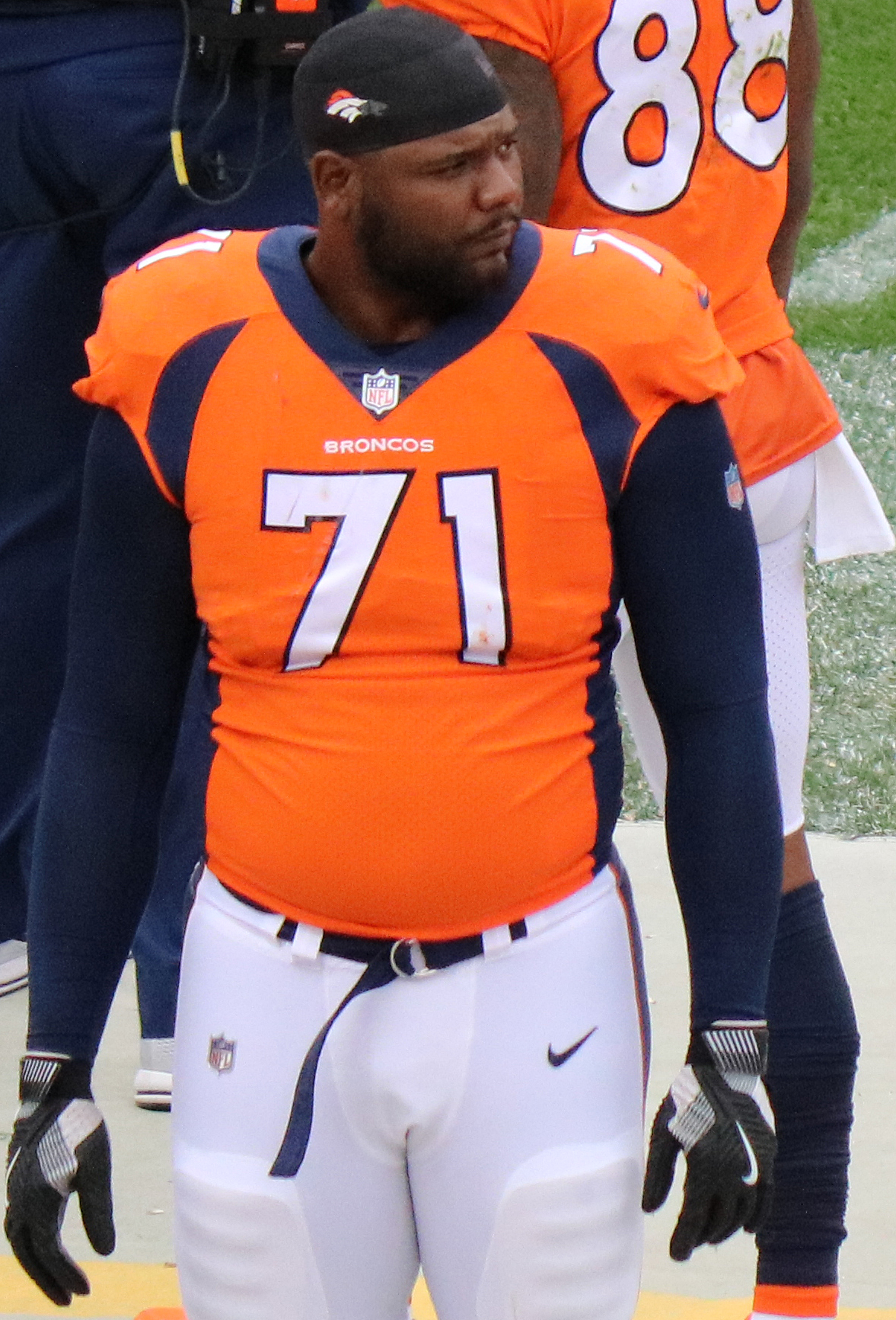
- Stephenson with the Denver Broncos in 2017

No. 71, 79
- Position: Offensive tackle

Personal information
- Born: September 30, 1988 (age 38); Kansas City, Missouri, U.S.
- Listed height: 6 ft 6 in (1.98 m)
- Listed weight: 312 lb (142 kg)

Career information
- High school: Blue Springs (Blue Springs, Missouri)
- College: Oklahoma (2007–2011)
- NFL draft: 2012: 3rd round, 74th overall pick

Career history
- Kansas City Chiefs (2012–2015); Denver Broncos (2016–2017); Cleveland Browns (2018)*
- * Offseason or practice squad member only

Career NFL statistics
- Games played: 80
- Games started: 37
- Stats at Pro Football Reference

Donald Wayne Stephenson (born September 30, 1988) is an American former professional football player who was an offensive tackle in the National Football League (NFL). He played college football for the Oklahoma Sooners. Stephenson was selected by the Kansas City Chiefs in the third round of the 2012 NFL draft. He was also a member of the Denver Broncos and briefly with the Cleveland Browns before retiring in July 2018.

== Professional career ==
=== Kansas City Chiefs ===
Stephenson was selected by the Kansas City Chiefs in the third round of the 2012 NFL draft. On August 22, 2014, it was announced that Stephenson violated league rules for performance-enhancing drugs and he served a four-game suspension. During his four seasons with the Kansas City Chiefs, he started 21 games at both tackle spots and guard.

=== Denver Broncos ===
On March 9, 2016, Stephenson signed a three-year contract with the Denver Broncos worth $14 million with $10 million guaranteed. In the 2016 season, Stephenson was the Broncos' starting right tackle for most of the season.

In 2017, Stephenson started four of the final five games of the season after losing the starting right tackle job to Menelik Watson and the primary backup job to Allen Barbre.

=== Cleveland Browns ===
On March 15, 2018, Stephenson signed a one-year, $2.5 million contract with the Cleveland Browns. On June 15, 2018, Stephenson was suspended for he first two games of the regular season for violating the league's Policy and Program for Substances of Abuse. On July 6, 2018, the Browns placed Stephenson on their reserve/retired list after skipping voluntary OTAs and mandatory minicamp and after being given the two-game suspension.
