= Jamell Fleming =

American football player (born 1989)

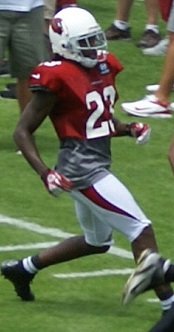
- Fleming with the Arizona Cardinals in 2012

No. 23, 29, 30
- Position: Cornerback

Personal information
- Born: May 5, 1989 (age 37); Edinburg, Texas, U.S.
- Listed height: 5 ft 11 in (1.80 m)
- Listed weight: 206 lb (93 kg)

Career information
- High school: Arlington (TX) Seguin
- College: Oklahoma (2007–2011)
- NFL draft: 2012: 3rd round, 80th overall pick

Career history
- Arizona Cardinals (2012–2013); Jacksonville Jaguars (2013); Baltimore Ravens (2014)*; Kansas City Chiefs (2014–2015)
- * Offseason or practice squad member only

Awards and highlights
- 2× First-team All-Big 12 (2010, 2011)

Career NFL statistics
- Total tackles: 71
- Fumble recoveries: 1
- Pass deflections: 9
- Stats at Pro Football Reference

Jamell Fleming (born May 5, 1989) is an American former professional football player who was a cornerback in the National Football League (NFL). Originally selected by the Arizona Cardinals in the third round of the 2012 NFL draft, he also played for the Jacksonville Jaguars and the Kansas City Chiefs. He played college football for the Oklahoma Sooners.

== College career ==
Fleming attended the University of Oklahoma from 2007 to 2011. He finished his career with 168 tackles, seven interceptions, two touchdown and a sack. As a junior, he was the Defensive MVP of the 2011 Fiesta Bowl.

== Professional career ==
=== Pre-draft ===
Pre-draft measurables
Height	Weight	Arm length	Hand span	40-yard dash	10-yard split	20-yard split	20-yard shuttle	Three-cone drill	Vertical jump	Broad jump	Bench press
5 ft 10 5/8 in (1.79 m)	206 lb (93 kg)	31 1/4 in (0.79 m)	9 1/2 in (0.24 m)	4.53 s	1.59 s	2.63 s	3.97 s	6.71 s	34.0 in (0.86 m)	10 ft 5 in (3.18 m)	23 reps
All values from NFL Combine

He was considered one of the best cornerback prospects for the 2012 NFL draft.

=== Arizona Cardinals ===
On April 28, 2012, Fleming was selected by the Arizona Cardinals in the third round (80th pick overall) of the 2012 NFL draft. He was released on September 14, 2013.

=== Jacksonville Jaguars ===
On September 16, 2013, Fleming was claimed off waivers by the Jacksonville Jaguars. He was released by the Jaguars on August 30, 2014.

=== Baltimore Ravens ===
Fleming was signed to the Baltimore Ravens' practice squad on September 3, 2014.

=== Kansas City Chiefs ===
Fleming was signed off the Baltimore Ravens' practice squad by the Kansas City Chiefs on September 12, 2014. On September 3, 2016, he was released by the Chiefs.
