= 2009 Oklahoma Sooners football team =

American college football season

2009 Oklahoma Sooners football

Sun Bowl champion

Sun Bowl, W 31–27 vs. Stanford
- Conference: Big 12 Conference
- South
- Record: 8–5 (5–3 Big 12)
- Head coach: Bob Stoops (11th season)
- Offensive coordinator: Kevin Wilson (8th season)
- Offensive scheme: No-huddle spread
- Defensive coordinator: Brent Venables (11th season)
- Base defense: 4–3
- Captains: Sam Bradford; Brody Eldridge; Gerald McCoy; Ryan Reynolds
- Home stadium: Gaylord Family Oklahoma Memorial Stadium (Capacity: 82,112)

2009 Big 12 Conference football standings
	Conf.			Overall
Team	W		L	W		L
North Division
No. 14 Nebraska x	6	–	2	10	–	4
Missouri	4	–	4	8	–	5
Kansas State	4	–	4	6	–	6
Iowa State	3	–	5	7	–	6
Colorado	2	–	6	3	–	9
Kansas	1	–	7	5	–	7
South Division
No. 2 Texas x$	8	–	0	13	–	1
Oklahoma State	6	–	2	9	–	4
No. 21 Texas Tech	5	–	3	9	–	4
Oklahoma	5	–	3	8	–	5
Texas A&M	3	–	5	6	–	7
Baylor	1	–	7	4	–	8
Championship: Texas 13, Nebraska 12
$ – BCS representative as conference champion; x – Division champion/co-champions; Rankings from AP Poll

The 2009 Oklahoma Sooners football team represented the University of Oklahoma in the 2009 NCAA Division I FBS football season, the 115th season of Sooner football. The team was led by two-time Walter Camp Coach of the Year Award winner, Bob Stoops, in his 11th season as head coach. They played their home games at Gaylord Family Oklahoma Memorial Stadium in Norman, Oklahoma. They were a charter member of the Big 12 Conference.

Conference play began with a win over the Baylor Bears at home on October 10, and ended with a win at home over the Oklahoma State Cowboys in the annual Bedlam Series on November 28. The Sooners finished the regular season with a 7–5 record (5–3 in the Big 12), their worst record since 1999, while finishing in a tie with Texas Tech for third in the Big 12 South. They were invited to the Sun Bowl, where they upset the Stanford Cardinal, 31–27.

Following the season, four members of the team were drafted in the first round of the 2010 NFL draft: Sam Bradford at #1, Gerald McCoy at #3, Trent Williams at #4, and Jermaine Gresham at #21. Oklahoma thus became the first school in the history of the NFL draft with three players selected in the top four picks. In addition to those four players, Keenan Clayton was selected in the 4th round, and Dominique Franks and Brody Eldridge were drafted in the 5th. This total number of seven ties with the total following the 2011 season as the second most Sooners selected in the NFL draft in the 16 years of the Stoops era, placing behind the mark of 11 after the 2004 season.

== Recruits ==
College recruiting
Name	Hometown	School	Height	Weight	40^{‡}	Commit date
Josh Aladenoye; OL	Mesquite, Texas	North Mesquite HS	6 ft 5 in (1.96 m)	347 lb (157 kg)	5.5	Jun 11, 2008
Josh Aladenoye; OL	Recruit ratings: Scout: Rivals: (76)					
Drew Allen; QB	San Antonio, Texas	Alamo Heights HS	6 ft 5 in (1.96 m)	209 lb (95 kg)	4.7	Aug 18, 2008
Drew Allen; QB	Recruit ratings: Scout: Rivals: (75)					
Jaydan Bird; LB	Conway Springs, Kansas	Conway Springs HS	6 ft 2 in (1.88 m)	215 lb (98 kg)	4.5	Mar 29, 2008
Jaydan Bird; LB	Recruit ratings: Scout: Rivals: (78)					
Kevin Brent; DB	Dallas, Texas	South Oak Cliff HS	5 ft 11 in (1.80 m)	196 lb (89 kg)	4.42	Nov 3, 2008
Kevin Brent; DB	Recruit ratings: Scout: Rivals: (81)					
Jarrett Brown; DE	Arlington, Texas	Bowie HS	6 ft 4 in (1.93 m)	242 lb (110 kg)	4.7	Feb 1, 2009
Jarrett Brown; DE	Recruit ratings: Scout: Rivals: (40)					
Justin Chaisson; DE	Las Vegas, Nevada	Bishop Gorman HS	6 ft 4 in (1.93 m)	252 lb (114 kg)	4.72	Apr 15, 2008
Justin Chaisson; DE	Recruit ratings: Scout: Rivals: (81)					
Tyler Evans; OL	Strafford, Missouri	Strafford HS	6 ft 6 in (1.98 m)	299 lb (136 kg)	—	Jun 14, 2008
Tyler Evans; OL	Recruit ratings: Scout: Rivals: (78)					
Terry Franklin; DE	Mansfield, Texas	Mansfield Legacy HS	6 ft 3 in (1.91 m)	199 lb (90 kg)	4.62	Feb 21, 2008
Terry Franklin; DE	Recruit ratings: Scout: Rivals: (77)					
Javon Harris; DB	Lawton, Oklahoma	MacArthur HS	5 ft 11 in (1.80 m)	179 lb (81 kg)	4.5	Apr 2, 2008
Javon Harris; DB	Recruit ratings: Scout: Rivals: (78)					
Demontre Hurst; DB	Lancaster, Texas	Lancaster HS	5 ft 11 in (1.80 m)	170 lb (77 kg)	4.4	Feb 3, 2009
Demontre Hurst; DB	Recruit ratings: Scout: Rivals: (75)					
Gabe Ikard; TE	Oklahoma City, Oklahoma	Bishop Mcguinness HS	6 ft 4 in (1.93 m)	246 lb (112 kg)	—	Nov 2, 2008
Gabe Ikard; TE	Recruit ratings: Scout: Rivals: (78)					
Tavaris Jeffries; OL	Clarksdale, Mississippi	Coahoma CC	6 ft 5 in (1.96 m)	320 lb (150 kg)	—	Jan 30, 2009
Tavaris Jeffries; OL	Recruit ratings: Scout: Rivals:					
Gus Jones; LB	Wagoner, Oklahoma	Wagoner HS	6 ft 2 in (1.88 m)	211 lb (96 kg)	4.63	May 29, 2008
Gus Jones; LB	Recruit ratings: Scout: Rivals: (79)					
Cameron Kenney; WR	Garden City, Kansas	Garden City	6 ft 2 in (1.88 m)	195 lb (88 kg)	4.4	Jan 25, 2009
Cameron Kenney; WR	Recruit ratings: Scout: Rivals:					
Ronnell Lewis; LB	Dewar, Oklahoma	Dewar HS	6 ft 3 in (1.91 m)	220 lb (100 kg)	—	Feb 6, 2008
Ronnell Lewis; LB	Recruit ratings: Scout: Rivals: (82)					
Gabe Lynn; DB	Jenks, Oklahoma	Jenks HS	6 ft 0 in (1.83 m)	185 lb (84 kg)	4.47	Dec 18, 2008
Gabe Lynn; DB	Recruit ratings: Scout: Rivals: (82)					
Jamarkus McFarland; DT	Lufkin, Texas	Lufkin HS	6 ft 3 in (1.91 m)	280 lb (130 kg)	4.9	Dec 25, 2008
Jamarkus McFarland; DT	Recruit ratings: Scout: Rivals: (83)					
Jonathon Miller; RB	Garland, Texas	Naaman Forest HS	6 ft 0 in (1.83 m)	180 lb (82 kg)	4.5	Mar 5, 2008
Jonathon Miller; RB	Recruit ratings: Scout: Rivals: (79)					
Marshall Musil; ATH	La Crosse, Kansas	La Crosse HS	6 ft 2 in (1.88 m)	220 lb (100 kg)	4.64	Jun 19, 2008
Marshall Musil; ATH	Recruit ratings: Scout: Rivals: (74)					
Jaz Reynolds; WR	Aldine, Texas	Eisenhower HS	6 ft 2 in (1.88 m)	182 lb (83 kg)	4.5	Aug 11, 2008
Jaz Reynolds; WR	Recruit ratings: Scout: Rivals: (75)					
Marcus Trice; DB	Mesquite, Texas	Mesquite HS	5 ft 8 in (1.73 m)	167 lb (76 kg)	4.5	Jul 21, 2008
Marcus Trice; DB	Recruit ratings: Scout: Rivals: (75)					
Jeff Vinson; OL	Scranton, Pennsylvania	Lackawanna	6 ft 6 in (1.98 m)	348 lb (158 kg)	—	Dec 12, 2008
Jeff Vinson; OL	Recruit ratings: Scout: Rivals:					
Tom Wort; LB	New Braunfels, Texas	New Braunfels HS	6 ft 1 in (1.85 m)	210 lb (95 kg)	4.42	Apr 16, 2008
Tom Wort; LB	Recruit ratings: Scout: Rivals: (82)					
Overall recruit ranking: Scout: 10 Rivals: 13
‡ Refers to 40-yard dash; Note: In many cases, Scout, Rivals, 247Sports, On3, and ESPN may conflict in their listings of height, weight and 40 time.; In these cases, the average was taken. ESPN grades are on a 100-point scale.; Sources: "2009 Oklahoma Football Commitment List". Rivals.; "2009 Player Commitments – Oklahoma". ESPN.; "2009 Team Ranking". Rivals.com.

== Schedule ==
Date	Time	Opponent	Rank	Site	TV	Result	Attendance
September 5	6:00 p.m.	vs. No. 20 BYU*	No. 3	Cowboys Stadium; Arlington, TX (Cowboys Classic)	ESPN	L 13–14	75,437
September 12	6:00 p.m.	Idaho State*	No. 13	Gaylord Family Oklahoma Memorial Stadium; Norman, OK	FSN PPV	W 64–0	84,749
September 19	2:30 p.m.	Tulsa*	No. 12	Gaylord Family Oklahoma Memorial Stadium; Norman, OK	FSN	W 45–0	84,803
October 3	7:00 p.m.	at No. 17 Miami (FL)*	No. 8	Land Shark Stadium; Miami Gardens, FL	ABC	L 20–21	61,790
October 10	2:30 p.m.	Baylor	No. 19	Gaylord Family Oklahoma Memorial Stadium; Norman, OK	ABC	W 33–7	84,478
October 17	11:00 a.m.	vs. No. 3 Texas	No. 20	Cotton Bowl; Dallas, TX (Red River Rivalry) (College GameDay)	ABC	L 13–16	96,009
October 24	2:30 p.m.	at No. 24 Kansas	No. 25	Memorial Stadium; Lawrence, KS	ABC	W 35–13	51,104
October 31	6:00 p.m.	Kansas State^{†}	No. 22	Gaylord Family Oklahoma Memorial Stadium; Norman, OK	FSN	W 42–30	84,021
November 7	7:00 p.m.	at Nebraska	No. 20	Memorial Stadium; Lincoln, NE (rivalry)	ABC	L 3–10	86,115
November 14	6:00 p.m.	Texas A&M		Gaylord Family Oklahoma Memorial Stadium; Norman, OK	FSN	W 65–10	85,013
November 21	11:30 a.m.	at Texas Tech		Jones AT&T Stadium; Lubbock, TX	FSN	L 13–41	50,479
November 28	11:30 a.m.	No. 11 Oklahoma State		Gaylord Family Oklahoma Memorial Stadium; Norman, OK (Bedlam Series)	FSN	W 27–0	85,606
December 31	1:00 p.m.	vs. No. 19 Stanford*		Sun Bowl Stadium; El Paso, TX (Sun Bowl)	CBS	W 31–27	53,713
*Non-conference game; ^{†}Homecoming; Rankings from AP Poll released prior to the game; All times are in Central time

== Roster ==
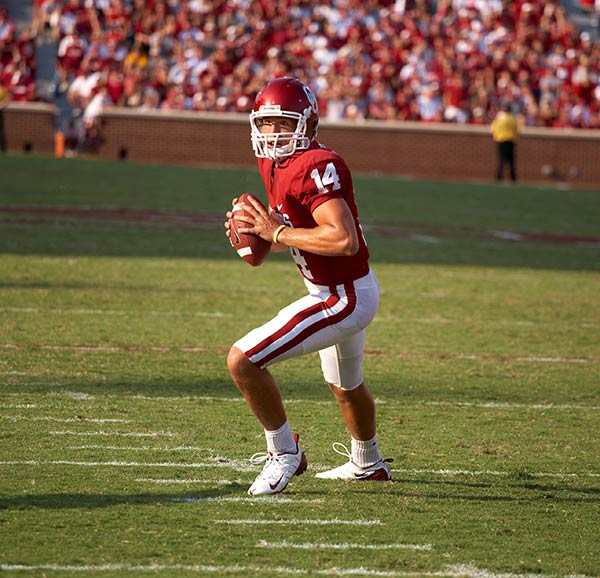
Heisman Trophy winning quarterback Sam Bradford returned for his junior year. He was one of four team captains for the 2009 squad.

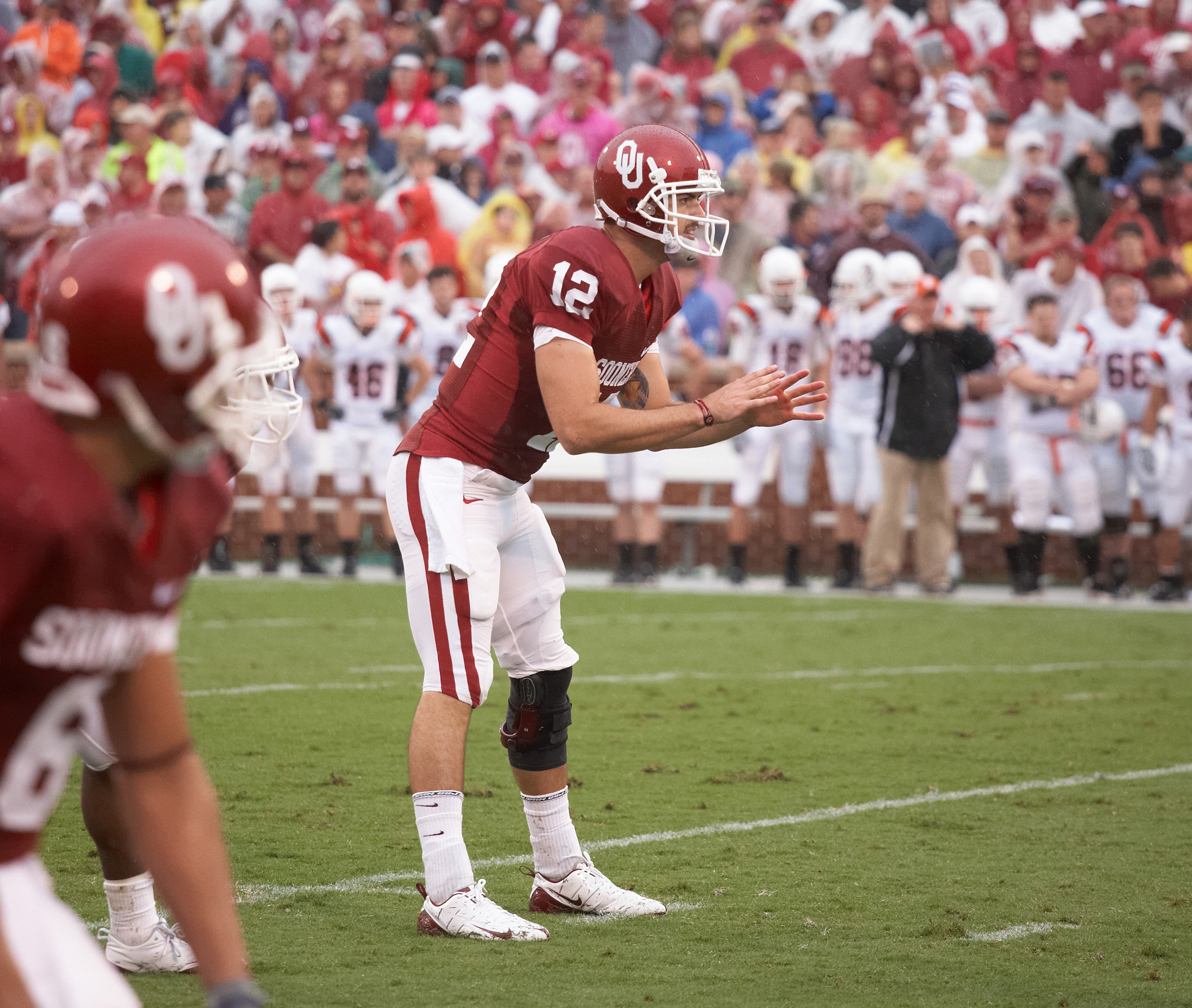
Redshirt freshman quarterback Landry Jones after taking over for an injured Sam Bradford early in the 2009 season.

Oklahoma listed 103 players on the roster with a breakdown of 21 seniors, 22 juniors, 22 sophomores, 14 redshirt freshmen, and 24 true freshmen. Sam Bradford, Brody Eldridge, Gerald McCoy and Ryan Reynolds served as team captains for the 2009 squad. During the course of the season, Oklahoma suffered many injuries. Many of those injuries were starters. Those that missed at least one game during the 2009 season include quarterback Sam Bradford (injured in game one, came back for game five but was reinjured in game 6 and missed the rest of the season), tight end Jermaine Gresham (injured before the start of the season), guards Brian Simmons (injured in game five and missed five games), Jarvis Jones and Brody Eldridge (both injured in game nine and out the rest of the season), wide receivers Ryan Broyles (injured in game four and missed one game) and Brandon Caleb, defensive end Auston English (injured in game nine and out the rest of the season), safety Quinton Carter, linebacker Tom Wort (injured before the season) and running back DeMarco Murray.

2009 Oklahoma Sooners football team roster
Players
Coaches
Offense

Pos.	#	Name	Class
WR	4	Jameel Owens	So
QB	5	John Nimmo	Jr
WR	6	Cameron Kenney	Jr
RB	7	DeMarco Murray	Jr
WR	8	Brandon Caleb	Jr
QB	12	Landry Jones	Fr
WR	13	Corey Wilson (injured)	So
QB	14	Sam Bradford (injured) (C)	Jr
QB	15	Drew Allen	Fr
WR	16	Jaz Reynolds	Fr
WR	17	Mossis Madu	Jr
TE	18	Jermaine Gresham (injured)	Sr
WR	19	Ryan Caro	So
WR	20	Samson Adeoye	So
RB	23	Jermie Calhoun	Fr
WR	24	Dejuan Miller	So
RB	25	Michael Malone	Fr
RB	26	Jonathan Miller	Fr
RB	29	Chris Brown	Sr
FB	32	Marshall Musil	Fr
FB	34	Matt Clapp	Sr
RB	35	Princz Jones	Jr
TE	41	Josh New	Jr
FB	48	Brandon Crow	Jr
TE	49	Woody Toms	Fr
OL	51	Brian Lepak	Jr
TE	47	Trent Ratterree	So
OL	54	Devin Frazier	Jr
OL	59	Donald Stephenson	So
OL	61	Ben Habern
OL	66	Curtis Chambers	Fr
OL	70	Cory Brandon	Jr
OL	71	Trent Williams	Sr
OL	72	Tavaris Jeffries	Jr
OL	73	Josh Aladenoye	Fr
OL	74	Brian Simmons	Sr
OL	75	Tyler Evans	Fr
OL	76	Jarvis Jones	So
OL	77	Stephen Good	So
OL	78	Jake Reed	Fr
OL	79	Jeff Vinson	Jr
WR	80	Adron Tennell	Sr
WR	81	Carter Whitson	Sr
TE	82	James Hanna	So
TE	83	Brody Eldridge (C)	Sr
TE	84	Gabe Ikard	Fr
WR	85	Ryan Broyles	So
QB	87	Lane Johnson	So
TE	88	Eric Mensik	Jr
WR	89	T.J. Hamilton	Sr

Defense

Pos.	#	Name	Class
DB	1	Dominique Franks	Jr
DB	2	Brian Jackson	Sr
DB	3	Jonathan Nelson	Jr
LB	4	Ryan Reynolds (C)	Sr
LB	5	Joseph Ibiloye	Fr
DB	6	Desmond Jackson	So
DB	9	Gabe Lynn	Fr
LB	10	Mike Balogun (I)	Sr
DB	11	Kevin Brent	Fr
LB	12	Austin Box	So
DB	13	Marcus Trice	Fr
DB	15	Lamar Harris	Fr
DB	19	Demontre Hurst	Fr
DB	20	Quinton Carter	Jr
LB	21	J.R. Bryant	Sr
LB	22	Keenan Clayton	Sr
DB	25	Emmanuel Jones	Sr
DB	27	Sam Proctor	So
LB	28	Travis Lewis	So
DB	30	Javon Harris	Fr
LB	31	Daniel Franklin	Fr
DB	32	Jamell Fleming	So
DE	33	Auston English	Sr
DB	38	Derrick Bradley	Fr
LB	41	Erik Lee	Fr
LB	42	Tom Wort (injured)	Fr
DB	43	Jesse Bell	So
DE	44	Jeremy Beal	Jr
LB	45	Gus Jones	Fr
DB	46	Jordan Finch	Fr
DB	47	Zach Montana	Fr
DL	53	Casey Walker	Fr
LB	55	Jaydan Bird	Fr
LB	56	Ronnell Lewis	Fr
DE	62	Tola Jimoh	Sr
DE	81	Jarrett Brown	Fr
DE	84	Frank Alexander	So
DT	86	Adrian Taylor	Jr
DT	89	Cordero Moore	Sr
DE	90	David King	Fr
DE	91	R.J. Washington	Fr
DL	92	Stacy McGee	Fr
DT	93	Gerald McCoy (C)	Jr
DE	94	Pryce Macon	Jr
DE	95	Justin Chaisson	Fr
DT	96	DeMarcus Granger (injured)	Sr
DT	97	Jamarkus McFarland	Fr
DE	98	Billy Batchelear	Jr

Special teams

Pos.	#	Name	Class
K	17	Jimmy Stevens	So
K	36	Tress Way	Fr
K	37	Matthew Moreland	Jr
K	43	Patrick O'Hara	So
DS	52	Derek Shaw	Sr
DS	58	Sean Morrison	So
DS	63	Ben Hampton	Sr
DS	86	James Winchester	So
K	94	Bryce Easley	Fr

Head coach

- Bob Stoops (11th season)

Coordinators/assistant coaches

- Kevin Wilson (8th season) – Offensive coordinator/tight ends/Fullbacks
- Brent Venables (11th season) – Associate head coach/defensive coordinator/linebackers
- Bobby Jack Wright (11th season) – Assistant Head Coach/Co-defensive Coordinator/defensive backs
- Cale Gundy (11th season) – Recruiting Coordinator/running backs
- Jay Norvell (2nd season) – Assistant Offensive coordinator/wide receivers
- James Patton (4th season) – Offensive line
- Josh Heupel (5th season) – Quarterbacks
- Jackie Shipp (11th season) – Defensive line
- Chris Wilson (5th season) – Special Teams Coordinator/Defensive Ends
- Jerry Schmidt (4th season) – Director of Sports Enhancement

Legend

- (C) Team captain
- (S) Suspended
- (I) Ineligible
- Injured
- Redshirt

Roster
Last update: November 16, 2009

== Game summaries ==
=== BYU (Cowboys Classic) ===
#20 BYU Cougars vs. #3 Oklahoma Sooners

Team	1	2	3	4	Total
• #20 BYU	0	7	0	7	14
#3 Oklahoma	7	3	0	3	13

- Date: September 5
- Location: Cowboys Stadium, Arlington, Texas
- Game start: 6:06 p.m. CST
- Elapsed time: 3:16
- Game attendance: 75,437
- Game weather: 73 °F (23 °C) • Wind: 0 mph • Weather: Indoors
- Referee: Scott Novak
- TV announcers (ESPN): Brad Nessler (Play-by-play), Todd Blackledge (Color), & Heather Cox (Sideline)

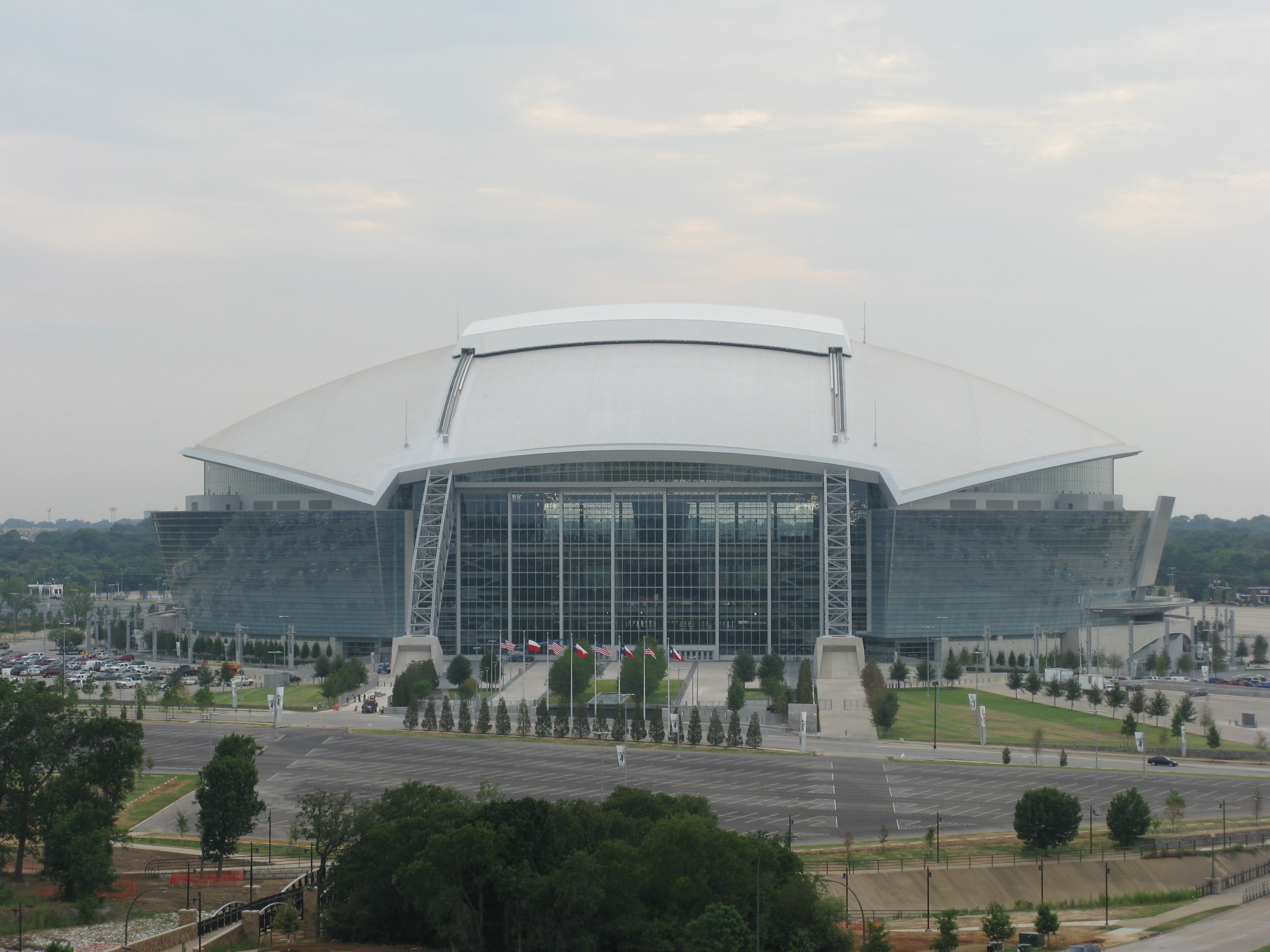
Cowboys Stadium, site of the Sooners' season opener.

The Sooners opened the season on the road in the newly constructed Cowboys Stadium in Arlington, Texas against the 20th ranked program in the country. Going into the game, Oklahoma was 10–1 in season openers and 9–2 in road openers under Bob Stoops. This was only the second time these teams had faced each other, the first coming in the 1994 Copper Bowl when the #22 ranked Cougars threw for 485 yards and defeated the Sooners 31–6. The Cougars were led by four-year head coach Bronco Mendenhall, who was then 32-7 as the Cougars head coach. The Sooners, ranked number three in the preseason, were favored to win by a large margin with most estimates at around 21 points. BYU earned approximately $1.5 million for playing the Sooners, while the Sooners received $2.25 million for playing in Dallas.

Prior to the game, both teams experienced multiple personnel issues. On the BYU side, left tackle Matt Reynolds fractured a finger and was still questionable for the season opener. Starting guard Jason Speredon was out for the season with a torn rotator cuff. Freshman Houston Reynolds also experienced a season-ending injury when he tore his ACL. A few days prior to the game, Oklahoma All-American Jermaine Gresham suffered a season-ending knee injury. Oklahoma saw several issues develop in their linebacker corp. Freshman Tom Wort tore his ACL during practice and would end up missing the entire season. Senior Mike Balogun experienced legal issues when his eligibility was called into question and subsequently decertified to participate in the 2009 season by the NCAA. Balogun sued the NCAA and was granted a temporary restraining order so he could continue to practice. He missed the season opener after he was unable to quickly resolve the issue with the NCAA.

The Cougars controlled the ball for much of the game, maintaining possession for over 37 minutes. Oklahoma was the first to score on an 8-yard pass to sophomore WR Ryan Broyles with five minutes left in the first quarter. BYU had missed a 46-yard field goal in their prior possession. On BYU's last possession of the half, quarterback Max Hall completed a 49-yard pass to Bryan Kariya which left the Cougars 5 yards short of the end zone. Two plays later, Hall completed another pass for a touchdown to tie the game. On the Sooners next possession, and the last series before halftime, the Sooners began at their own 30-yard line. After completing his longest pass of the game, an 18-yard pass to Brandon Caleb, which broke the school record for most passing yards in a career, previously held by Jason White, Sam Bradford went down with a shoulder injury. He would miss the rest of the game. The Sooners managed a 35-yard field goal to go up 10–7 at the half.

The third quarter was quiet offensively. BYU reached midfield on their third possession of the quarter which marked the furthest progression of either team during the quarter. On BYU's last possession of the quarter, Hall threw his second interception of the game to Oklahoma linebacker Keenan Clayton, leaving Oklahoma within 25 yards from the end zone. Despite the short yardage, Oklahoma and redshirt freshman quarterback Landry Jones were unable to capitalize and settled for a field goal to extend their lead to 13–7. The next BYU possession proved tantamount for the Cougars. After beginning on their own 22-yard line, they drove down the field for 16 plays and scored a touchdown to go up 14–13. This included a fourth down conversion that resulted in a 23-yard gain. The Oklahoma defense held the BYU offense back for a while, forcing the Cougars to execute seven plays within the seven-yard line before finally succumbing. The BYU defense held Oklahoma on their next possession, securing the win.

=== Idaho State ===
Idaho State Bengals at #13 Oklahoma Sooners

Team	1	2	3	4	Total
Idaho State	0	0	0	0	0
• #13 Oklahoma	21	20	7	16	64

- Date: September 12
- Location: Gaylord Family Oklahoma Memorial Stadium, Norman, Oklahoma
- Game start: 6:05 p.m. CST
- Elapsed time: 3:15
- Game attendance: 84,749
- Game weather: 72 °F (22 °C) • Wind: NE 8 mph • Weather: Rain
- Referee: Roger Gaskamp
- TV announcers (FSN PPV): Bill Jones (Play-by-play), Dean Blevins (Color), & Elissa Walker Campbell (Sideline)

Idaho State served as the 2009 home opener for the Oklahoma Sooners. The Bengals competed in the Big Sky Conference of the NCAA Division I-FCS. This was the third time Oklahoma had played a Division I FCS (previously I-AA) team under Bob Stoops. Oklahoma won the previous two matchups by a combined score of 106–2. This game had a similar result to the other two. With backup quarterback Landry Jones making his first start, Oklahoma won 64–0 for their 25th consecutive win at home, tying the school record.

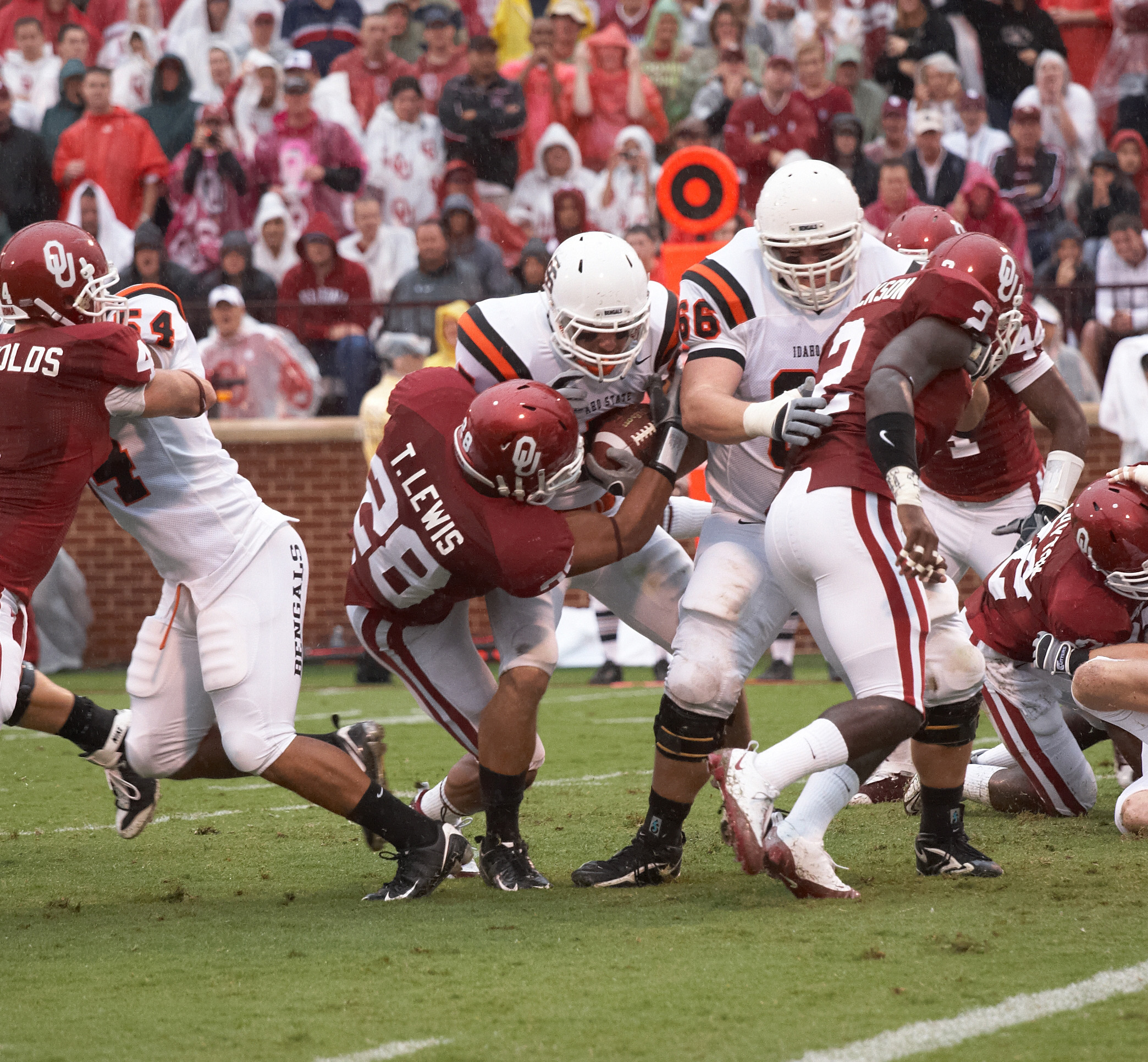
Travis Lewis tackles a Bengal ball carrier.

Idaho State made an immediate impression on Oklahoma during the Sooner's first possession. With his first pass as a starter, Jones connected with wide receiver Ryan Broyles for a 34-yard gain. After a couple additional rushes and passes, Oklahoma found itself two yards shy of the end zone. After four plays, Oklahoma was unable to penetrate the end zone and turned the ball over to the Bengals. Unable to produce anything offensively, the Bengals turned the ball back over to Oklahoma a short time later. On their second possession of the quarter, Jones and Broyles again connected, this time for a 24-yard touchdown pass. Oklahoma would end the first quarter up 21–0 after the OU defense sacked the Idaho State quarterback, forcing a fumble, which was returned for a touchdown. Soon came another 51-yard touchdown pass from Jones to Broyles. Jones and Broyles connected for a third time in the opening possession of the second quarter with an 11-yard touchdown pass. After another fumble recovery for the Sooners near midfield, Oklahoma increased their lead to 34–0. Oklahoma added one more touchdown before halftime to go up 41–0. By halftime, Idaho State had accumulated negative-two yards of total offense.

Oklahoma added one touchdown in the third quarter. In the fourth quarter, Oklahoma added two more, one on a 36-yard rush by backup running back Jonathon Miller. Idaho State was never able to get anything going on offense and only crossed midfield once, to make it to Oklahoma's 49-yard line. They finished the game with 44 total yards, including negative 22 rushing yards. Oklahoma finished with 564 total yards which included 286 passing yards by Jones. Running back DeMarco Murray also finished the game with 101 rushing yards.

=== Tulsa ===
Tulsa Golden Hurricane at #12 Oklahoma Sooners

Team	1	2	3	4	Total
Tulsa	0	0	0	0	0
• #12 Oklahoma	10	21	14	0	45

- Date: September 19
- Location: Gaylord Family Oklahoma Memorial Stadium, Norman, Oklahoma
- Game start: 2:35 p.m. CST
- Elapsed time: 3:25
- Game attendance: 84,803
- Game weather: 74 °F (23 °C) • Wind: NW 9 mph • Weather: Partly Cloudy
- Referee: Greg Burks
- TV announcers (FSN): Joel Meyers (Play-by-play), Dave Lapham (Color), & Jim Knox (Sideline)

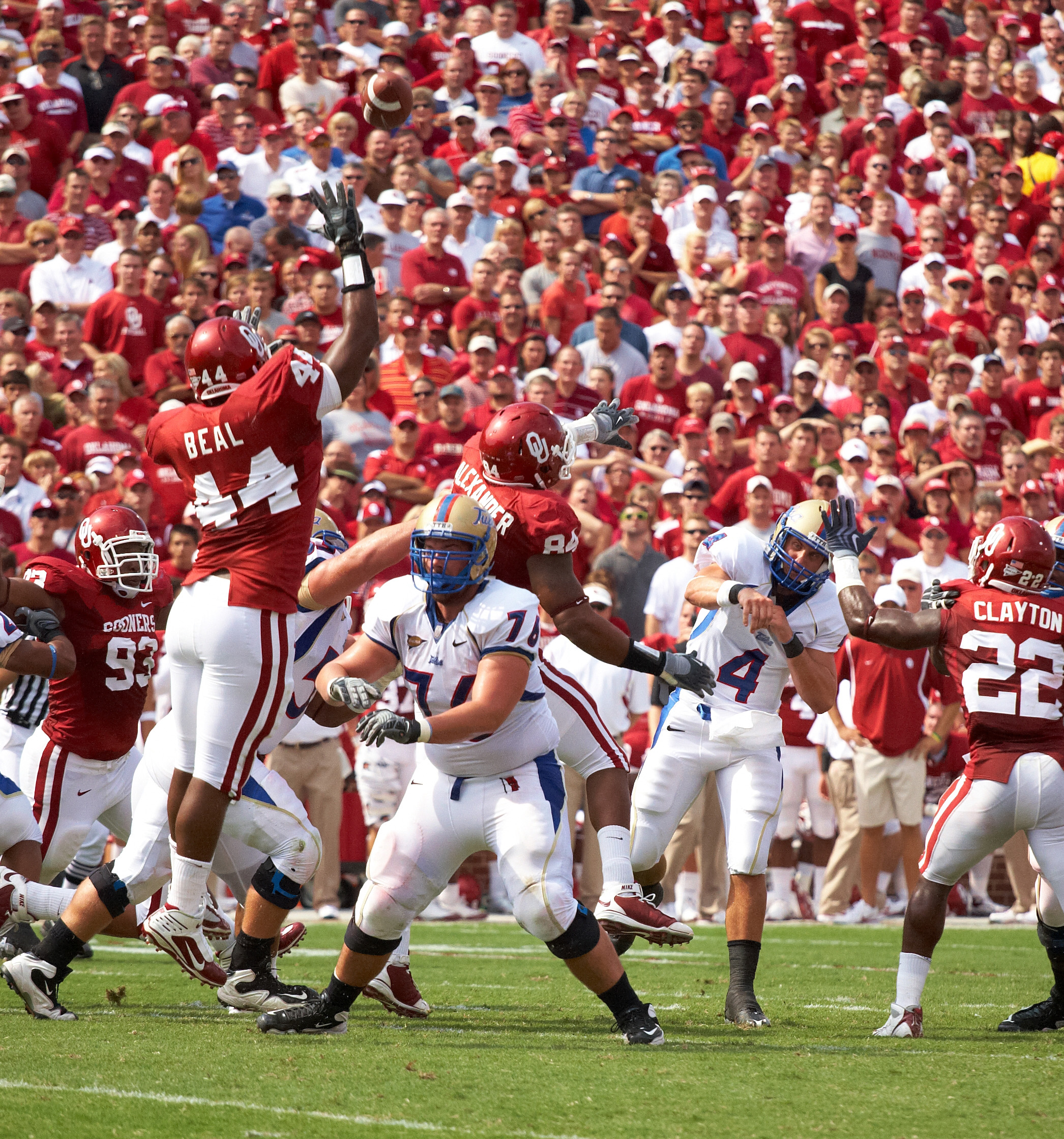
Tulsa quarterback GJ Kinne attempts a pass. The Sooner defense held the Golden Hurricane scoreless in the 2009 game.

In a continuation of the instate series, Oklahoma hosted the Tulsa Golden Hurricane for the third game of the season. The two teams first faced each other in 1914 with the Sooners leading the series 15-7-1. Since 1979, when the series was renewed following a 36-year hiatus, the Sooners were 9–1. Tulsa came into the game as the NCAA-leader in total offense in the prior two seasons, and they had averaged 450 yards of total offense in their first two games of the 2009 season.

The Sooners began the game by throwing an interception on the opening play. Tulsa was unable to move the ball and went three-and-out. Oklahoma took possession and managed to progress to Tulsa's five-yard line, but, due to penalties, lost yardage and had to settle for a field goal. Tulsa then started their drive and managed to progress to Oklahoma's 12-yard line. However, Tulsa quarterback G. J. Kinne's pass was intercepted in the end zone. Starting at their own two-yard line, Oklahoma was unable to progress and was forced to punt the ball back to Tulsa who subsequently missed a 50-yard field goal. Oklahoma ended the first quarter with a touchdown pass from QB Landry Jones to wide receiver Brandon Caleb. Tulsa opened the second quarter with a drive that led them back to the Oklahoma 12-yard line, where Oklahoma defensive players promptly forced a fumble, and recovered. Oklahoma scored quickly with a 63-yard touchdown pass to Caleb on the second play of the drive. Oklahoma scored two more touchdowns in the second quarter to go up 31–0 at halftime.

The second half again saw no touchdowns for the Tulsa offense. Twice Tulsa attempted to convert on a fourth down, but failed both times. The closest Tulsa progressed to the Oklahoma end zone in the second half was the Sooner's 27-yard line. Oklahoma, however, added two touchdowns in the second half. Oklahoma quarterback Landry Jones, in his second start, set a school record with six touchdown passes in a game. The previous record of five touchdown passes in a game was held by three Sooners: Jones's quarterback coach and Heisman Trophy runner-up Josh Heupel and Heisman Trophy-winners Jason White and Sam Bradford. Jones was later named the AT&T ESPN All-American National Player of the Week. This game also marked the second straight shutout by the Sooners, the first time since 1987. Oklahoma also extended their school record of consecutive wins at home to 26. Oklahoma finished the game with 529 yards of total offense and Tulsa with 269.

=== Miami (FL) ===
#8 Oklahoma Sooners at #17 Miami Hurricanes

Team	1	2	3	4	Total
#8 Oklahoma	7	3	7	3	20
• #17 Miami	0	7	14	0	21

- Date: October 3
- Location: Land Shark Stadium, Miami Gardens, Florida
- Game start: 8:12 p.m. EST
- Elapsed time: 3:14
- Game attendance: 61,790
- Game weather: 82 °F (28 °C) • Wind: calm • Weather: Clear
- Referee: Adrian Hill
- TV announcers (ABC): Brent Musburger (Play-by-play), Kirk Herbstreit (Color), & Lisa Salters (Sideline)

Following the bye week, Oklahoma traveled to Miami Gardens, Florida to play Miami. This was the final game in a two-game series that began in 2007 when the Hurricanes visited Norman, where the Sooners soundly defeated them 51-13 after Sam Bradford threw five touchdown passes and the Sooner defense limited them to 139 total yards.

The Oklahoma defense came into the game without letting a score for 123 minutes after posting back-to-back shutouts. Oklahoma was the fourth consecutive ranked opponent Miami had faced, opening 2–1 after defeating Florida State and Georgia Tech but losing to Virginia Tech in the week prior to Oklahoma. Much of the pre-game hype had surrounded whether Oklahoma starting quarterback Sam Bradford would return after suffering an injury in the season opener. On the Thursday prior to the game, it was decided that freshman Landry Jones would make his third start against Miami. Going into the game, Oklahoma was a seven-point favorite.

Oklahoma scored first after Dominique Franks intercepted a pass from Jacory Harris, the Miami quarterback, on the Oklahoma 4-yard line. Oklahoma drove the length of the field and Jones connected with received Cameron Kenney for a 16-yard touchdown. Miami's next possession ended the same way when Brian Jackson intercepted another Harris pass on the Oklahoma 7-yard line. Early in the second quarter, Oklahoma made its way to the Miami 4-yard line but was unable to score a touchdown and instead settled for a field goal to give them a 10–0 lead. Miami answered on the next possession. Following a fumble that Miami was able to regain, Harris completed an 18-yard pass to Jimmy Graham for a touchdown to bring the score to 10–7, with Oklahoma still on top.

Oklahoma got the ball to begin the second half but immediately turned it over after the Miami defense sacked Jones and forced a fumble at the Oklahoma 11-yard line. Miami recovered it and quickly converted it to a touchdown, taking the lead by a score of 14–10. Oklahoma was not able to answer and instead incurred two personal foul penalties forcing them into a fourth down with 42 yards to go. Miami took possession after the punt and capitalized with a third touchdown giving them an 11-point lead. Trying to prevent the game from getting out of hand, Oklahoma marched down the field after plays that included a 19-yard rush from Chris Brown, a 25-yard pass to Cameron Kenney, and a 21-yard pass to DeMarco Murray to score a touchdown to decrease the deficit to four. The score would remain unchanged until Oklahoma scored a field goal near the end of the fourth quarter on a drive that saw six consecutive running plays and one pass that gained no yards. Miami took possession of the ball with just over four minutes remaining in the game and were able to hold that possession until time expired giving them a one-point win.

Miami not only won by just one point, but they also shared similar statistics with Oklahoma. Both managed 21 first down, and while Miami managed 342 yards of total offense, Oklahoma had 341. Miami won the passing battle with 202 yards to Oklahoma's 188. Oklahoma won the ground game with 153 yards to Miami's 140. During the game, the Sooners leading wide receiver, Ryan Broyles, suffered a broken shoulder blade. It was later determined he would miss up to six weeks because of the injury.

=== Baylor ===
Baylor Bears at #19 Oklahoma Sooners

Team	1	2	3	4	Total
Baylor	0	7	0	0	7
• #19 Oklahoma	0	14	9	10	33

- Date: October 10
- Location: Gaylord Family Oklahoma Memorial Stadium, Norman, Oklahoma
- Game start: 2:35 p.m. CST
- Elapsed time: 3:17
- Game attendance: 84,478
- Game weather: 55 °F (13 °C) • Wind: N 10 mph • Weather: Partly Cloudy
- Referee: Karl Richins
- TV announcers (ABC): Ron Franklin (Play-by-play) & Ed Cunningham (Color)

Oklahoma returned home to take on the Baylor Bears following their loss to Miami. Entering the game, Oklahoma was a perfect 18–0 against the Bears and had outscored them by an average of 43–12. Baylor had lost 18 consecutive games against top 25 opponents. For the second week in a row, much of the pre-game talk had been on whether Oklahoma quarterback Sam Bradford would return following an injury sustained in the first game of the season. That talk ended the day before the game when it was announced Bradford would make an appearance in the game against Baylor. Baylor was without their starting quarterback, Robert Griffin III, who suffered a season ending knee injury earlier in the season, and their backup quarterback, Blake Szymanski, who had a shoulder injury but still played late in the game. This forced Baylor to rely on their third-string quarterback, freshman Nick Florence.

Baylor controlled the ball for most of the first half, gaining a total of 166 yards. However, it was a pair of touchdown runs by Oklahoma's Chris Brown, both in the second quarter, that put the Sooners up 14–7 at halftime. Baylor's points came during a drive that started on their own 41-yard line and included a 43-yard pass that put them in the red zone. In the second half, Oklahoma's offense failed to capitalize in the red zone on several occasions. The Oklahoma offense progressed to inside the Baylor 20-yard line four times but was forced to settle for a field goal each time. Oklahoma's kicker Jimmy Stevens was 4-for-4, making field goals of 35, 25, 21, and 24 yards. Oklahoma did not score a touchdown in the second half until within the five-minute mark to put them up 33–7. Baylor went three-and-out in their next possession and Oklahoma ran out the clock to end the game.

In his first game back, Bradford completed 27 of his 49 pass attempts for 389 yards. Head coach Bob Stoops was disappointed that his receivers dropped eleven balls, including at least five that were "dead right in their hands." DeMarco Murray finished with 113 yards on 24 carries to lead the Oklahoma ground game to a total of 203 yards. The Oklahoma offense ended the day with a season-high 592 total yards to Baylor's 268. Florence managed 220 yards in the air on 41 attempts while the original back up, Szymanski, completed one of his two pass attempts for 42 yards. Baylor's ground game only netted 6 yards.

=== Texas (Red River Rivalry) ===
#20 Oklahoma Sooners vs. #3 Texas Longhorns

Team	1	2	3	4	Total
#20 Oklahoma	6	0	7	0	13
• #3 Texas	0	3	10	3	16

- Date: October 17
- Location: Cotton Bowl, Dallas
- Game start: 11:09 a.m. CST
- Elapsed time: 3:42
- Game attendance: 96,009
- Game weather: 60 °F (16 °C) • Wind: NW 5 mph • Weather: Cloudy
- Referee: Scott Novak
- TV announcers (ABC): Brent Musburger (Play-by-play), Kirk Herbstreit (Color), & Lisa Salters (Sideline)

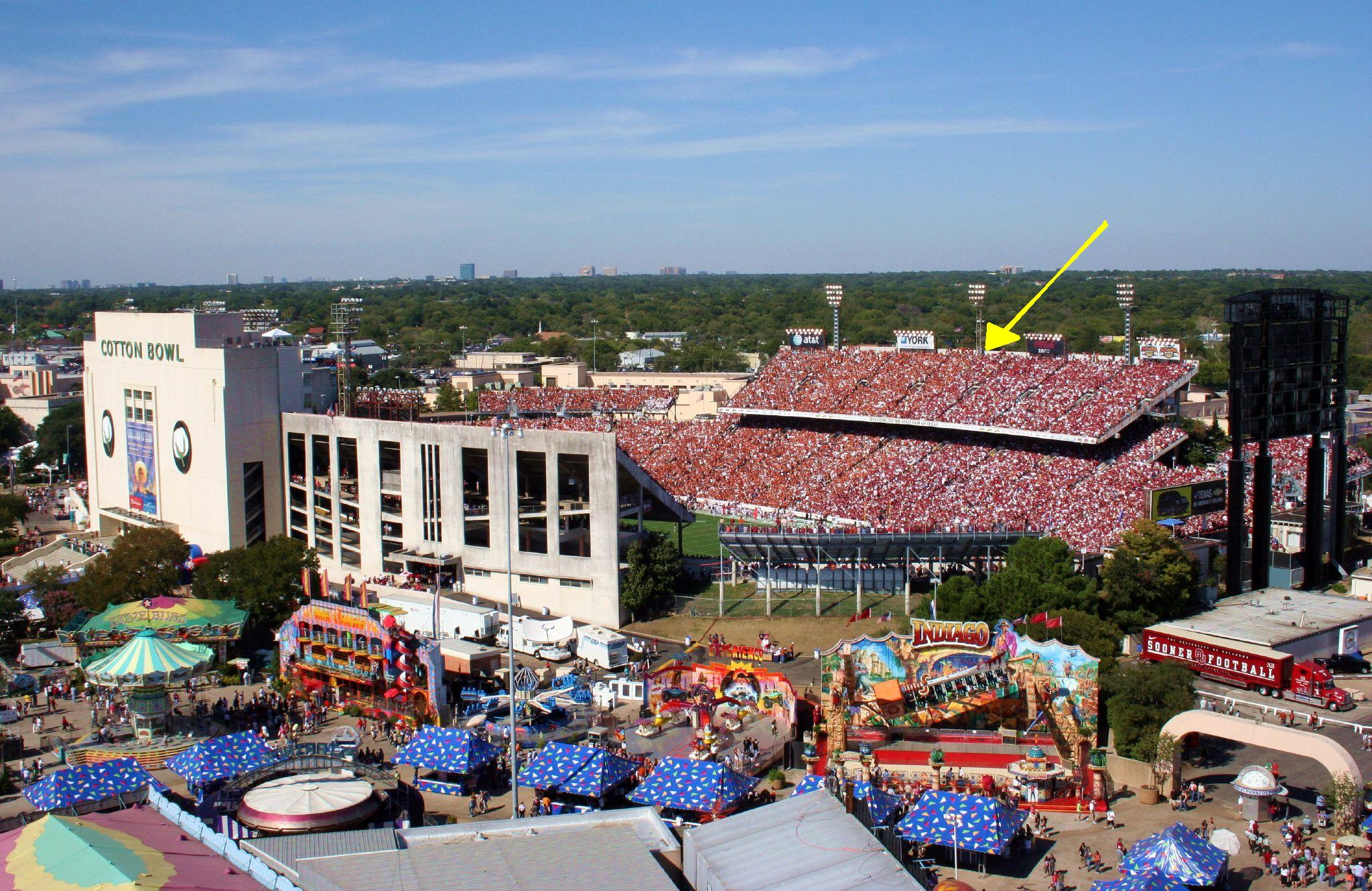
The 2006 Red River Shootout with yellow arrow indicating the seating division in the stands.

This game marked the 104th meeting of the Red River Rivalry, which has been called one of the greatest sports rivalries. Since 1929, the game has been held at the Cotton Bowl in Dallas, Texas typically in mid-October with the State Fair of Texas occurring adjacent to the stadium. Going into the 2009 match, Texas led the series 58–40–5, but Oklahoma coach Bob Stoops was 6–4 against Texas. Texas came into the game undefeated, ranked number 3, and with two Heisman contenders: quarterback Colt McCoy and receiver Jordan Shipley. They were also the highest scoring team in the FBS up to that point. However, Texas also had injury concerns going into the game. Before the game, it was unclear if running backs Tre' Newton and Vondrell McGee would play (McGee would later get one carry during the game). On the Oklahoma side, offensive guard Brian Simmons was injured during the Baylor game and would miss the game, while WR Ryan Broyles, who was injured during the Miami game and was originally thought to be out four to six weeks, would make an early reentry and start in the Texas game.

Oklahoma's issues in the red zone continued into the Red River Rivalry. During the first possession of the game, Oklahoma drove from their own 14-yard line to the Texas nine primarily on a 64-yard pass from QB Sam Bradford to RB DeMarco Murray but was unable to capitalize with a touchdown on three attempts and had to settle for a field goal giving them the early lead, 3–0. On the ensuing Texas possession, the Oklahoma defense sacked McCoy, forcing a fumble, which was picked up by linebacker Ryan Reynolds. After the fumble recovery, the Texas defense followed up with a sack on Bradford. During the sack, Bradford fell on the same shoulder that he injured in the season opener, re-injuring it, and taking him out for the rest of the game. Oklahoma backup quarterback Landry Jones entered the game. Oklahoma went three-and-out, as did Texas on their next possession. After a couple passes from Jones to Brandon Caleb and Cameron Kenney, Oklahoma was again inside the Texas 20-yard line, where they again settled for a field goal. The second quarter opened with Texas's defense forcing a fumble which was recovered by Texas's Emmanuel Acho on the Texas 24-yard line. Texas was unable to capitalize and was forced to punt after reaching mid-field. Later in the 2nd quarter, after another Texas punt, Oklahoma punt returner Dominique Franks fumbled the ball, and it was recovered again by Texas, this time on the Oklahoma 18-yard line. The Oklahoma defense withstood the Texas offense, and Texas settled for a field goal to cut the lead in half, 6–3.

After halftime, Texas began with the ball and a 23-yard rush by Fozzy Whittaker. Texas progressed to and then stalled at the Oklahoma 25-yard line. After another field goal, the game was tied at six. After an Oklahoma three-and-out, Texas scored the first touchdown of the game on a drive that consisted of 12 plays, capped off with a 14-yard pass from McCoy to Marquise Goodwin. In the next possession, Oklahoma answered with an 18-yard pass from Jones to senior wide receiver Adron Tennell and a 35-yard pass to Broyles. The game was again tied at 13. Texas and Oklahoma both followed with three-and-outs. On Texas's last possession of the third quarter, which ran into the 4th quarter, they again progressed to the Oklahoma red zone but settled for a field goal to take the lead 16–13. In the 4th quarter, two consecutive Oklahoma drives ended with Jones throwing an interception. Oklahoma was unable to score and Texas ran down the clock for the win.

Oklahoma was never able to get a running game going and settled for negative 16 yards rushing while Texas had 142 yards. Oklahoma dominated the air game with 327 yards to Texas's 127. The game also saw many penalties on both sides of the ball. Oklahoma had 10 penalties for 125 yards and Texas had 11 for 103 yards. Texas won the turnover battle, forcing five Oklahoma turnovers while Oklahoma forced three. McCoy had one of the worst passing games of his career, while the Oklahoma defense only allowed four passes to Shipley for 22 yards. The game was watched by 8,713,000 television viewers and was the fifth most-viewed game during the 2009 regular season.

=== Kansas ===
#25 Oklahoma Sooners at #24 Kansas Jayhawks

Team	1	2	3	4	Total
• #25 Oklahoma	7	7	14	7	35
#24 Kansas	0	6	0	7	13

- Date: October 24
- Location: Memorial Stadium, Lawrence, Kansas
- Game start: 2:36 p.m. CST
- Elapsed time: 3:10
- Game attendance: 51,104
- Game weather: 65 °F (18 °C) • Wind: SW 13 mph • Weather: Partly Cloudy
- Referee: Cooper Castleberry
- TV announcers (ABC): Ron Franklin (Play-by-play) & Ed Cunningham (Color)

Oklahoma traveled to Lawrence, Kansas for their first interdivision match against the Kansas Jayhawks. Kansas, coached by former Oklahoma assistant Mark Mangino, came into the game ranked 24 in the AP Poll and 25 in the Coaches Poll following a loss to Colorado the previous week. The Sooners won the previous matchup 45–31 in 2007 in which Sam Bradford threw for a school record 468 yards. Coming into the game, Oklahoma led the all-time series 68–27–6 and Bob Stoops was 5–0 against the Jayhawks.

Kansas began the game with the ball, but on the first play of the game, Oklahoma intercepted a pass from Kansas quarterback Todd Reesing. Oklahoma converted that turnover into a touchdown to take an early lead. The next Kansas possession ended the same way but Oklahoma was unable to convert again. At the end of the first quarter, Kansas was in the midst of a drive that had progressed to the Oklahoma 15-yard line. Starting the second quarter, Kansas gained an additional five yards to the 10-yard line. On the next play, Reesing threw a pass that was intercepted by Oklahoma's Dominique Franks who ran 85 yards for the touchdown and gave Oklahoma a 14–0 lead. Kansas was able to put points on the board late in the second quarter. With just over two minutes left in the half, Kansas kicker Jacob Branstetter kicked a 39-yard field goal. On the next Oklahoma possession, the Kansas defense intercepted a pass thrown by Landry Jones at the Oklahoma 40-yard line. Kansas was unable to move the ball forward and decided to attempt a 57-yard field goal with two seconds left. The successful attempt made the score 14–6 at halftime. The Oklahoma offense made more progress in the third quarter and added two touchdowns. Oklahoma scored its last touchdown early in the fourth quarter to go up 35–6. Midway through the fourth quarter, Oklahoma running back Jermie Calhoun fumbled the ball and Kansas recovered at their own 45-yard line. Kansas was able to convert the turnover into a touchdown with 4:27 left on the clock. Oklahoma took possession of the ball and drained as much of the clock as possible before punting the ball to Kansas in time for them to run one last play.

Oklahoma quarterback Jones, starting after the re-injury of Bradford's shoulder, was 26-for-38 for 251 yards and two touchdowns. The Kansas offense, ranked number two in the country, was held to about 200 yards below its average. The day after the game, Sam Bradford announced he would have season-ending shoulder surgery and would enter April's NFL draft.

=== Kansas State ===
Kansas State Wildcats at #22 Oklahoma Sooners

Team	1	2	3	4	Total
Kansas State	0	9	14	7	30
• #22 Oklahoma	21	7	0	14	42

- Date: October 31
- Location: Gaylord Family Oklahoma Memorial Stadium, Norman, Oklahoma
- Game start: 6:05 p.m. CST
- Elapsed time: 3:28
- Game attendance: 84,021
- Game weather: 72 °F (22 °C) • Wind: WSW 7 mph • Weather: Clear
- Referee: Tom Walker
- TV announcers (FSN): Joel Meyers (Play-by-play), Dave Lapham (Color), & Jim Knox (Sideline)

Following the victory over Kansas, Oklahoma faced another team from the state. Kansas State, coached by Bob Stoops' mentor, Bill Snyder, traveled to Norman as the leader in the Big 12 North. The season before, Oklahoma tied a school record for most points in a half when they scored 55 points in the first half en route to winning 58–35. This year's game began similarly with Oklahoma scoring on their first three possessions on their way to a 21-point first quarter lead. All three touchdowns were passes from Landry Jones, two going to wide receiver Ryan Broyles and one to Dejuan Miller. Kansas State scored their first points early in the second quarter on a 2-yard rush from Keithen Valentine. Following a blocked extra point attempt, Oklahoma answered on their next possession to increase the lead to 28–6. The Wildcats managed a field goal before halftime to decrease the Sooner lead.

The second half saw the Wildcats surge — scoring a touchdown and a two-point conversion on their opening possession to cut the Sooner lead to 28–17. Following an Oklahoma four-and-out, Kansas State again scored but again had the extra point blocked. Oklahoma now led by only five points, 28–23. After not scoring during the third quarter, Oklahoma managed to score on the opening possession of the fourth quarter. On the ensuing kick off, Kansas State's Brandon Banks caught the ball at the 2-yard line and returned it for a touchdown to again cut the Sooner lead back to five. Oklahoma was able to score what would end up being the game sealing touchdown on the next possession to give them a 42–30 lead, which they held for the rest of the game.

=== Nebraska ===
#20 Oklahoma Sooners at Nebraska Cornhuskers

Team	1	2	3	4	Total
#20 Oklahoma	0	3	0	0	3
• Nebraska	0	7	3	0	10

- Date: November 7
- Location: Memorial Stadium, Lincoln, Nebraska
- Game start: 7:13 p.m. CST
- Elapsed time: 3:23
- Game attendance: 86,115
- Game weather: 52 °F (11 °C) • Wind: NE 8 mph • Weather: Clear
- Referee: Greg Burks
- TV announcers (ABC): Ron Franklin (Play-by-play) & Ed Cunningham (Color)

The Sooners' next match was against Nebraska, a rivalry from the Big Eight days and before. The first match between the two teams took place in 1912. The 2009 match-up saw the two defenses dominate. The only touchdown of the game came when Nebraska took one of their five interceptions and returned it to the Oklahoma one-yard line. Their field goal came when another interception of freshman quarterback Landry Jones put them in field goal range. Jones would finish with five interceptions, an Oklahoma record. The Sooners' only points came on a field goal from Tress Way with less than a minute left in the first half. Way missed three other field goals in the game. The three points for the Sooners was the lowest under coach Bob Stoops. The Sooners fell to 5–4 after the loss, the worst record through nine games under Stoops to date. Oklahoma suffered additional injuries during the game. Guards Brody Eldridge and Jarvis Jones and defensive end Auston English all suffered season ending injuries in the game.

=== Texas A&M ===
Texas A&M Aggies at Oklahoma Sooners

Team	1	2	3	4	Total
Texas A&M	10	0	0	0	10
• Oklahoma	14	28	16	7	65

- Date: November 14
- Location: Gaylord Family Oklahoma Memorial Stadium, Norman, Oklahoma
- Game start: 6:10 p.m. CST
- Elapsed time: 3:41
- Game attendance: 85,013
- Game weather: 54 °F (12 °C) • Wind: N 10 mph • Weather: Cloudy
- Referee: Rick Loumiet
- TV announcers (FSN): Joel Meyers (Play-by-play), Gary Reasons (Color), & Jim Knox (Sideline)

Following the loss to Nebraska, Oklahoma returned home to play the Texas A&M Aggies, led by second-year head coach Mike Sherman. Entering the game, Bob Stoops was 9–1 against the Aggies. The game got off to a quick start for the Sooners. In the opening drive, Aggie running back Christine Michael fumbled the ball at the Oklahoma 47-yard line and it was picked up by Oklahoma's Brian Jackson and returned 52 yards for a touchdown. Later in the first quarter, WR Ryan Broyles rushed 25 yards for a second Sooner touchdown. A&M's next possession began on the 40-yard line and ended with a field goal. Following the kickoff, Landry Jones threw a pass that was tipped and intercepted by A&M's Michael Hodges, who returned it 28 yards to the Oklahoma 6-yard line. A&M converted that to a touchdown and narrowed the lead. At the end of the first quarter, Oklahoma led 14–10. It was the first time Oklahoma had allowed points in the first quarter in 12 games. Oklahoma began to run away with the game in the second quarter and scored on every offensive possession to go up 42–10 at halftime. Texas A&M was held scoreless after the first quarter while the Sooners added an additional 23 points in the second half. Oklahoma finished the game with 640 yards of total offense including 392 passing yards, a career-high for Jones. Oklahoma extended their NCAA-leading home winning streak to 29 straight games.

=== Texas Tech ===
Oklahoma Sooners at Texas Tech Red Raiders

Team	1	2	3	4	Total
Oklahoma	3	3	0	7	13
• Texas Tech	3	14	10	14	41

- Date: November 21
- Location: Jones AT&T Stadium, Lubbock, Texas
- Game start: 11:40 a.m. CST
- Elapsed time: 3:20
- Game attendance: 50,479
- Game weather: 49 °F (9 °C) • Wind: S 9 mph • Weather: Clear
- Referee: Adrian Hall
- TV announcers (FSN): Joel Meyers (Play-by-play), Dave Lapham (Color), Joel Klatt (Color), & Jim Knox (Sideline)

For the final road game of the regular season, Oklahoma traveled to Lubbock, Texas where they had lost their previous two trips. Oklahoma had also struggled on the road during the season. They averaged nearly 50 points per game at home but just 17 points per game away from home. The game began with the Red Raiders scoring a field goal on their opening possession and Oklahoma responding on their second possession. The first quarter ended with a tie score of 3–3. Oklahoma increased their lead by three during the first possession of the second quarter. Texas Tech answered with a touchdown to go ahead 10–6. The next Texas Tech possession ended with another touchdown, which gave the Red Raiders a halftime lead of 17–6. The second half was dominated by Texas Tech. The Red Raiders were up 34–6 when Oklahoma scored again on a 51-yard touchdown pass to wide receiver Ryan Broyles. Texas Tech answered with their own touchdown to bring the score to 41–13. The 28-point margin of victory for the Red Raiders matched the second-worst loss by Oklahoma under Bob Stoops. The Oklahoma defense allowed 549 yards of total offense after not allowing more than 365 yards in any other game that season.

=== Oklahoma State (Bedlam Series) ===
#11 Oklahoma State Cowboys at Oklahoma Sooners

Team	1	2	3	4	Total
#11 Oklahoma State	0	0	0	0	0
• Oklahoma	0	10	10	7	27

- Date: November 28
- Location: Gaylord Family Oklahoma Memorial Stadium, Norman, Oklahoma
- Game start: 11:41 a.m. CST
- Elapsed time: 3:29
- Game attendance: 85,606
- Game weather: 61 °F (16 °C) • Wind: S 20 mph • Weather: Clear
- Referee: Tom Walker
- TV announcers (FSN): Bill Land (Play-by-play), Dave Lapham (Color), & Jim Knox (Sideline)

Scoring summary
2	13:45	OU	Patrick O'Hara 24-yard field goal	OU 3–0
2	10:20	OU	DeMarco Murray 13-yard TD run (Patrick O'Hara kick)	OU 10–0
3	8:19	OU	Patrick O'Hara 19-yard field goal	OU 13–0
3	3:38	OU	DeMarco Murray 12-yard run (Patrick O'Hara kick)	OU 20–0
4	8:37	OU	Ryan Broyles 87-yard punt return (Patrick O'Hara kick)	OU 27–0

The end of the regular season brought in-state rival Oklahoma State to Norman. This rivalry, referred to as the Bedlam Series, is the most lopsided series in the nation featuring two teams from the same state. Entering the game, Oklahoma led the series 80–15–7. At that time, Oklahoma State was one of only two teams that had defeated the Sooners at home under Bob Stoops. However, the Sooners came into the game with a six-game winning streak over the Cowboys. The Cowboys came into the game with hopes of a BCS berth, depending on a victory. Oklahoma State was ranked number 11 while the Sooners were unranked, which marked the third time a ranked Cowboys team played an unranked Sooners team, while the opposite scenario had occurred 38 times. Despite the ranking, Oklahoma was favored to win by eight points. In addition to the injuries Oklahoma had sustained throughout the season, Oklahoma State also came into the game missing a few of their key players. OSU wide receiver Dez Bryant was ruled ineligible by the NCAA in the weeks prior to the Bedlam game. Quarterback Zac Robinson missed the Cowboys' previous game due to a concussion.

The first quarter was plagued with fumbles by both teams. On the first offensive play following a 59-yard punt return by Ryan Broyles to the OSU 7-yard line, Oklahoma quarterback Landry Jones fumbled the ball, which was recovered by Oklahoma State. On OSU's first offensive play, running back Kendall Hunter fumbled the ball, but it was recovered by OSU. During an Oklahoma possession late in the first quarter, an incomplete pass to Dejuan Miller was ruled a fumble but was overturned following an instant replay analysis. Oklahoma State's next possession saw another fumble, this time by quarterback Robinson, but it was again recovered by the Cowboys. The first quarter ended scoreless with the only chance of points being a missed 35-yard field goal by Oklahoma kicker Patrick O'Hara. The second quarter opened with the continuation of a drive that began the previous quarter. Following another Oklahoma fumble that was recovered by the Sooners, Oklahoma settled for a 24-yard field goal to claim a 3–0 lead. On Oklahoma's next offensive possession, Jones connected with Broyles for a 47-yard completion to the OSU 13-yard line. The next play, DeMarco Murray rushed for the touchdown to give the Sooners a ten-point lead. Both teams were unable to put together a threatening drive for the remainder of the half.

Oklahoma opened the second half with a drive that lasted nearly seven minutes. Beginning at their own 20-yard line, the Sooners progressed to the Oklahoma State 2-yard line, but were forced to settle for a field goal to take a 13-point lead. Oklahoma State and then Oklahoma followed with quick three-and-outs. The next Cowboy possession began at the Oklahoma State 27-yard line. A pass from Robinson was intercepted by Jonathan Nelson and returned 37 yards to the OSU 13-yard line. DeMarco Murray scored a touchdown on a 12-yard rush two plays later. The third quarter ended with the Sooners up 20–0. Oklahoma's final score of the game came on an 87-yard punt return for a touchdown by Ryan Broyles halfway through the fourth quarter.

The recorded attendance for the game was 85,606, a Bedlam record, until it was broken in 2012 with a number of 85,824. The game also marked the 30th consecutive home victory, the longest in the country and a new record for the Sooners. The Cowboys came into the game averaging 400 yards per game in total offense (including a league-best 203 yards on the ground) but only managed 109 total yards (62 yards on the ground). Punter Tress Way also set a new school record by averaging 58.8 yards on his six punts. It also marked the first shutout in the series since 1993.

=== Stanford (Sun Bowl) ===
Oklahoma Sooners vs. #19 Stanford Cardinal

Team	1	2	3	4	Total
• Oklahoma	10	7	14	0	31
#19 Stanford	7	17	0	3	27

- Date: December 31
- Location: Sun Bowl Stadium, El Paso, Texas
- Game start: 12:11 p.m. MST
- Elapsed time: 3:56
- Game attendance: 53,713
- Game weather: 45 °F (7 °C) • Wind: NNE 11 mph • Weather: Sunny
- Referee: John O'Neill
- TV announcers (CBS/SportsUSA Radio): Craig Bolerjack (Play-by-play), Steve Beuerlein (Color), & Sam Ryan (Sideline)/Dan Fouts (Play-by-play) & John Robinson (Color)

== Rankings ==
Ranking movements Legend: ██ Increase in ranking ██ Decrease in ranking — = Not ranked RV = Received votes ( ) = First-place votes
	Week															
Poll	Pre	1	2	3	4	5	6	7	8	9	10	11	12	13	14	Final
AP	3	13	12	10	8	19	20	25	22	20	—	RV	—	RV	RV	RV
Coaches	3 (1)	14	12	9	8	21	18	RV	23	20	RV	RV	—	RV	RV	RV
Harris	Not released				9	20	18	25	22	19	RV	RV	RV	RV	RV	Not released
BCS	Not released							—	—	24	—	—	—	—	—	Not released

== Statistics ==
=== Team ===
	OU	Opp
Points per game	31.1	14.5
First downs	304	200
Rushing	110	76
Passing	154	98
Penalty	40	26
Rushing yardage	1,750	1,208
Rushing attempts	485	432
Avg per rush	3.6	2.8
Avg per game	134.6	179.7
Passing Yardage	3,760	2,336
Avg per game	289.2	179.7
Completions-Attempts	300-519 (57.8%)	233-434 (53.7%)
Total offense	5,510	3,544
Total plays	1,004	866
Avg per play	5.5	4.1
Avg per game	423.8	272.6
Fumbles-Lost	26-11	23-12

	OU	Opp
Punts-Yards	62–2,787 (45 avg)	100–4,238 42.4 avg)
Punt returns-Total yards	43-699 (16.3 avg)	17-30 (1.8 avg)
Kick returns-Total yards	33-687 (20.8 avg)	74-1,492 (20.2 avg)
Avg time of possession per game	28:43	31:17
Penalties-Yards	107–1,044	128–1,075
Avg per game	80.3	82.7
3rd down conversions	81/202 (40%)	62/207 (30%)
4th down conversions	7/20 (35%)	8/14 (57.1%)
Sacks by-Yards	38-243	15-124
Total TDs	50	22
Rushing	18	10
Passing	28	11
Field goals-Attempts	18-28 (64.3%)	12-16 (75%)
PAT-Attempts	48-50 (96%)	19-21 (90.5%)
Total attendance	508,670	249,488
Games-Avg per game	6-84,778	4-62,372

=== Scores by quarter ===
	1	2	3	4	Total
Opponents	20	77	51	41	189
Oklahoma	106	126	98	74	404

Statistics from: "Oklahoma Sooners – Cumulative Season Statistics". University of Oklahoma Department of Intercollegiate Athletics. Archived from the original on December 16, 2009.

== 2010 NFL draft ==
The 2010 NFL draft was held on April 22–24, 2010 at Radio City Music Hall in New York City. The following Oklahoma players were either selected or signed as undrafted free agents following the draft. Sam Bradford was the first Sooner drafted #1 overall since Billy Sims in 1980.

Player	Position	Round	Overall pick	NFL team
Sam Bradford	QB	1st	1	St. Louis Rams
Gerald McCoy	DT	1st	3	Tampa Bay Buccaneers
Trent Williams	OT	1st	4	Washington Redskins
Jermaine Gresham	TE	1st	21	Cincinnati Bengals
Keenan Clayton	OLB	4th	121	Philadelphia Eagles
Dominique Franks	DB	5th	135	Atlanta Falcons
Brody Eldridge	TE	5th	162	Indianapolis Colts
Matt Clapp	FB	Undrafted		Detroit Lions
Auston English	DE	Undrafted		Cleveland Browns
DeMarcus Granger	DT	Undrafted		Seattle Seahawks
Chris Brown	RB	Undrafted		Denver Broncos
Brian Jackson	CB	Undrafted		New York Jets
Mike Balogun	LB	Undrafted		San Francisco 49ers
