= Ryan Reynolds (American football) =

American football player (born 1986)

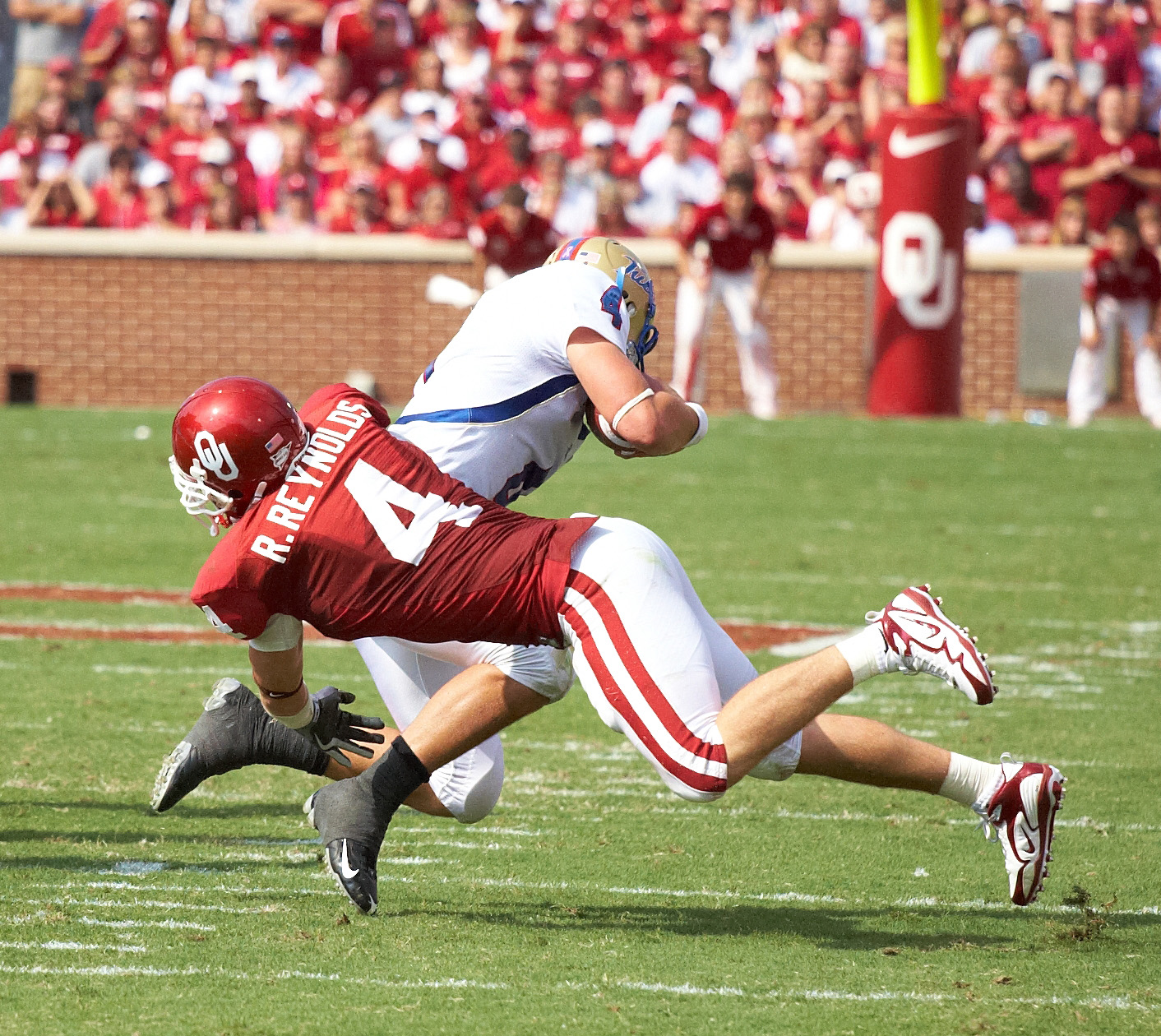
- Reynolds in 2009

No. 4, 8
- Position: Linebacker

Personal information
- Born: September 20, 1986 (age 40); Lake Havasu City, Arizona, U.S.
- Listed height: 6 ft 3 in (1.91 m)
- Listed weight: 231 lb (105 kg)

Career information
- High school: Bishop Gorman (Las Vegas, Nevada)
- College: Oklahoma (2005–2009)

Ryan Reynolds (born September 20, 1986) is a former linebacker for the Oklahoma Sooners. He was a four-year standout in football and judo in high school, both at Lake Havasu High School in Arizona and at Bishop Gorman High School in Summerlin, Nevada, where he was recognized nationally.

== Early life ==
Reynolds was a four-year letterman, two years at Lake Havasu High School and two years at Bishop Gorman in Las Vegas. He showed his athleticism and versatility, playing linebacker and defensive back on defense and tight end and fullback on offense. He was also a state wrestling champion and a five-time national judo champion. A View Newspaper article called Reynolds the 'most highly recruited high school football player in Nevada history'.

As a senior, he recorded 94 tackles (including 12 tackles for loss) and 6 sacks to go along with his junior year totals of 96 tackles and 6 sacks. As a junior, he also ran for a career best 393 yards from his fullback position. He was recognized at the Palo Alto Nike training camp in 2004 for his performance in their SPARQ (Speed, Power, Agility, Reaction, and Quickness) test. He scored higher on the test than any player in the Camp's history.

As a senior, he was a USA Today first team All-American, a Parade All-American (a publication that also recognized him as the top linebacker in the country), a U.S. Army All-American, and Nevada's Gatorade player of the year. Rivals.com and ESPN.com both ranked him the No. 2 outside LB in the nation. He was a consensus top 30 player nationally and Rivals.com placed him as the best player in the state of Nevada. He was also selected as the Las Vegas Sun state defensive player of the year. Reynolds was awarded the 2005 Walter Payton Trophy at the US Army All-American Bowl awards dinner.

At Bishop Gorman, Reynolds was a high school teammate of fellow OU Sooner DeMarco Murray.

== College career ==
=== 2005 and 2006 seasons ===
Reynolds was relegated to special teams as a true freshman, logging tackles against Oklahoma State, Nebraska, and Tulsa.

Although he was penciled in as a starter for the Sooners, Reynolds injured his ACL after spring practices and was redshirted for the 2006 Sooners.

=== 2007 and 2008 seasons ===
As a redshirt sophomore in 2007, Reynolds appeared in 13 games and recorded 60 total tackles. As a redshirt junior in 2008, he appeared in only six games and recorded 44 tackles.

=== 2009 season ===
In 2009, Reynolds recorded 79 total tackles to rank third on the Sooners team behind Travis Lewis and Quinton Carter.

In December 2009, the NCAA denied Reynolds his request to play a sixth year due to injuries.

After having suffered three major knee injuries during his college career, Reynolds did not initially attempt to pursue an NFL career. However, in 2012 he attempted to make a comeback but tweaked his hamstring during Oklahoma's 2012 pro day.
