= Walter Payton Trophy =

The Walter Payton Trophy (also known as EAS Speed & Strength Award) has been awarded annually since 2005 to the most athletic high school football player in the United States. Modeled after one of the NFL's all-time greats, Walter Payton, the award is given to the nation's fastest, strongest and most dedicated high school football player that best represents Payton's athleticism, hard work and ideals.

The U.S. Army All-American Bowl Selection Committee and EAS announce four finalists annually in December. These four athletes traveled to the Athletes' Performance training facility in Tempe, Arizona. Here they work out with athletic trainers and competed in a series of speed, strength and agility tests. The Trophy presentation takes place after the high school season at a formal dinner on the evening before the U.S. Army All-American Bowl in early January.

== List of winners ==
- 2005: Ryan Reynolds
- 2006: Taylor Mays
- 2007: Arrelious Benn
- 2008: Nigel Bradham
- 2009: Christine Michael
