= Ronnell Lewis =

American football player (born 1990)

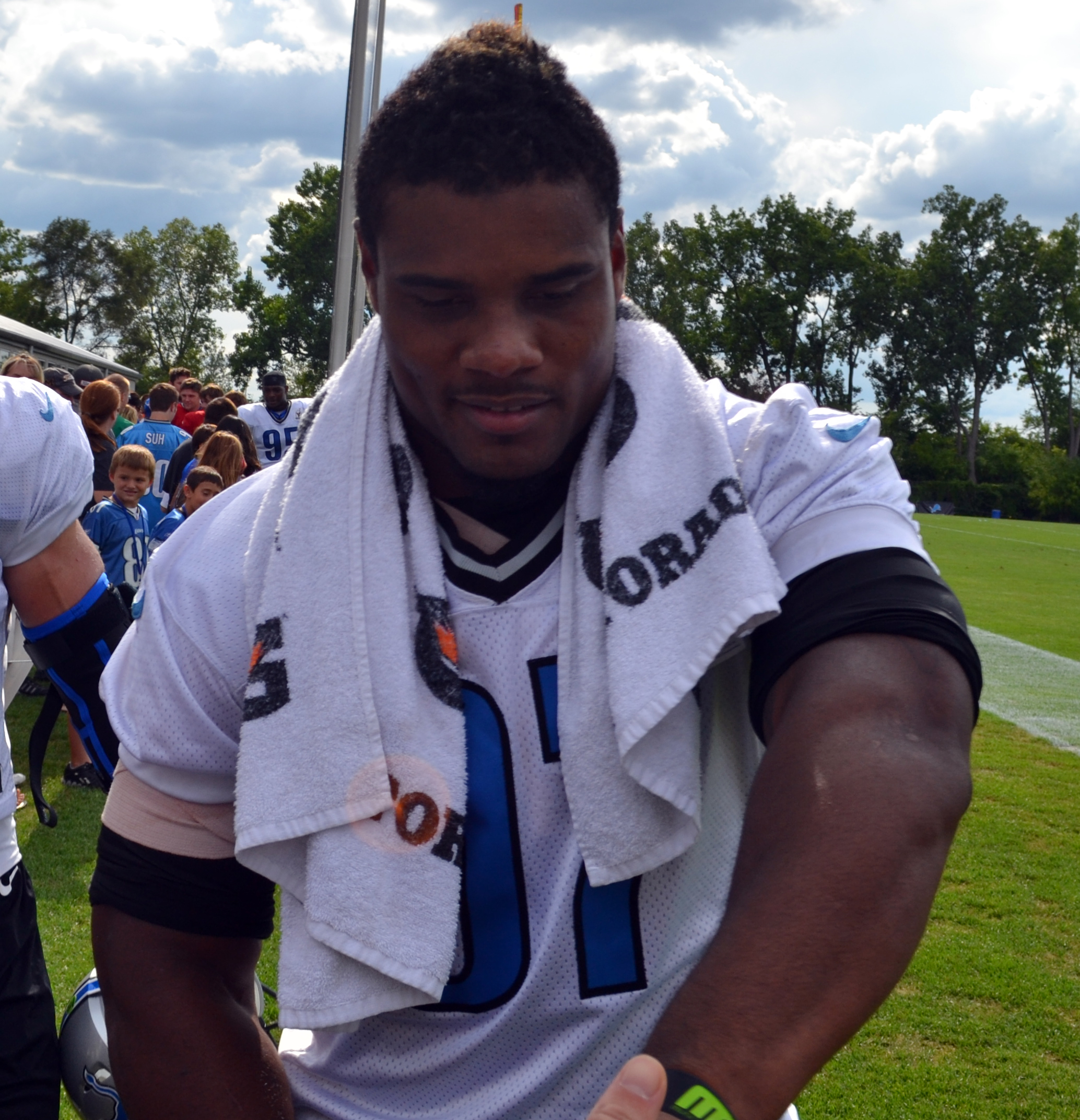
- Lewis with the Detroit Lions in 2012

No. 97
- Position: Linebacker

Personal information
- Born: September 17, 1990 (age 36); Dewar, Oklahoma, U.S.
- Listed height: 6 ft 1 in (1.85 m)
- Listed weight: 253 lb (115 kg)

Career information
- High school: Dewar
- College: Oklahoma
- NFL draft: 2012: 4th round, 125th overall pick

Career history
- Detroit Lions (2012); Toronto Argonauts (2013); Oklahoma Defenders (2014); Boston Brawlers (2014); Spokane Shock (2015)*; Los Angeles KISS (2015); Spokane Empire (2016)*
- * Offseason or practice squad member only

Awards and highlights
- First-team All-Big 12 (2011)

Career NFL statistics
- Total tackles: 2
- Stats at Pro Football Reference

Ronnell Anthony Lewis (born September 17, 1990) is an American former professional football player who was a linebacker in the National Football League (NFL). He played college football for the Oklahoma Sooners and was selected by the Detroit Lions in the fourth round of the 2012 NFL draft.

== Early life ==
Lewis attended Dewar High School in Dewar, Oklahoma, where he accounted for 2,219 yards on 150 rushes with 33 touchdowns in 2008 along with 156 tackles while he picked off 11 passes on defense and added 2,000 yards and 40 rushing touchdowns as a junior.

== College career ==
Known for his big hits, Oklahoma Sooner fans have nicknamed Lewis "the Hammer". He rose to national prominence after two big hits on special teams against Stanford in the 2009 Sun Bowl. Lewis followed up a promising freshman season with a stellar sophomore campaign in 2010 in which he logged 3.5 sacks, 37 tackles, 5 tackles for loss, and a 12-yard interception return for a touchdown against the Baylor Bears despite only starting four games. In the 2012 NFL Combine, Ronnell ran the 40-yard dash in 4.68s and performed 36 repetitions of 225 lbs.

== Professional career ==
Pre-draft measurables
Height	Weight	Arm length	Hand span	40-yard dash	20-yard shuttle	Three-cone drill	Vertical jump	Broad jump	Bench press
6 ft 3 in (1.91 m)	253 lb (115 kg)	32 1/4 in (0.82 m)	9 1/4 in (0.23 m)	4.68 s	4.40 s	7.09 s	31.0 in (0.79 m)	9 ft 4 in (2.84 m)	36 reps
All values from NFL Combine

=== Detroit Lions ===
In the 2012 NFL draft, Lewis was selected with the 125th overall pick (30th pick of the 4th round) to the Detroit Lions.

On August 25, 2013, he was released by the Detroit Lions.

=== Toronto Argonauts ===
On September 10, 2013, Lewis was signed by the Toronto Argonauts of the Canadian Football League to a practice roster agreement. He was released by the Argonauts on October 2, 2013.

=== Oklahoma Defenders ===
On November 26, 2013, Lewis was signed by the Oklahoma Defenders of the Champions Professional Indoor Football League for the 2014 season.

=== Boston Brawlers ===
Lewis played for the Boston Brawlers of the Fall Experimental Football League in Fall 2014.

=== Spokane Shock ===
On December 3, 2014, Lewis was assigned to the Spokane Shock of the Arena Football League.

=== Los Angeles KISS ===
On March 14, 2015, Lewis was traded to the Los Angeles KISS in exchange for Rod Harper. He was placed on reassignment on May 19, 2015.

=== Spokane Empire ===
On September 11, 2015, Lewis signed with Spokane again, but this team with the new Spokane Empire of the Indoor Football League. He was released on January 13, 2016.

== Personal life ==
Lewis is an enrolled member of the Muscogee (Creek) nation. On April 20, 2013, Lewis was arrested at 1:30 A.M. on three misdemeanor charges following a bar brawl at Norman, Oklahoma.
