= Rod Harper =

American football player (born 1985)

No. 13
- Position: Wide receiver

Personal information
- Born: March 26, 1985 (age 41); Bradenton, Florida, U.S.
- Listed height: 6 ft 0 in (1.83 m)
- Listed weight: 209 lb (95 kg)

Career information
- High school: Southeast (Bradenton, Florida)
- College: Murray State
- NFL draft: 2008: undrafted

Career history
- Green Bay Packers (2008)*; Arkansas Twisters (2009); New Orleans Saints (2009); Philadelphia Eagles (2010–2011)*; Spokane Shock (2012); Saskatchewan Roughriders (2013)*; San Jose SaberCats (2014); Los Angeles KISS (2015)*; Spokane Shock (2015); New Orleans VooDoo (2015)
- * Offseason or practice squad member only

Awards and highlights
- Super Bowl champion (XLIV); Second-team All-Ohio Valley Conference (2007)

Career AFL statistics
- Receptions: 160
- Receiving yards: 1,555
- Receiving touchdowns: 30
- Stats at ArenaFan.com
- Stats at Pro Football Reference

Rod Harper (born March 26, 1985) is an American former professional football wide receiver. He was signed as an undrafted free agent by the Green Bay Packers in 2008. He played college football at Murray State University.

Harper was also a member of the Arkansas Twisters, New Orleans Saints, Philadelphia Eagles, Spokane Shock, Saskatchewan Roughriders, San Jose SaberCats, Los Angeles KISS, and New Orleans VooDoo.

== College career ==
Harper attended Murray State University, where he led the team with 57 receptions for 779 yards and 10 touchdowns in 2007 and earned Second-team All-Ohio Valley Conference. He ranks third in university history in both career receiving yards (1,653) and touchdowns (20).

== Professional career ==
Green Bay Packers
Harper went unselected in the 2008 NFL draft and signed with the Green Bay Packers as an undrafted free agent.

New Orleans Saints
Harper joined the af2 following his release from the Packers, and was assigned to the Arkansas Twisters, where he debuted in 2009. On June 4, 2009, he signed a contract with the New Orleans Saints and was placed on the Twisters' "Other League Exempt" list. When he signed with the Saints, Harper was leading the league in multiple categories, including scoring (228 points), total touchdowns (38) and receiving touchdowns (38). He was also tied for the league lead in receptions (107) and ranked second in receiving yards (1,375).

Harper performed well in the Saints' 2009 preseason games, returning two punts for touchdowns, and he made the team's regular season roster. He was not active for any regular season games, however, and on October 16, 2009, the Saints placed him on their injured reserve list with a stress fracture in his left foot, effectively ending his 2009 season.

The Saints released Harper on August 24, 2010.

Philadelphia Eagles
Harper was signed to the Philadelphia Eagles' practice squad on September 22, 2010. He spent the rest of the season on the practice squad, and was re-signed to a future contract on January 10, 2011. He was waived during final cuts on September 2.

Spokane Shock
Harper played the 2012 season with the Spokane Shock of the Arena Football League (AFL).

Saskatchewan Roughriders
On April 19, 2013, it was announced Harper had signed with the Saskatchewan Roughriders of the Canadian Football League.

San Jose SaberCats
On November 25, 2013, Harper was assigned to the San Jose SaberCats of the AFL.

Los Angeles KISS
On March 5, 2015, Harper was assigned to the Los Angeles KISS.

Return to Spokane
On March 14, 2015, Harper was traded to the Spokane Shock, in exchange for Ronnell Lewis.

New Orleans VooDoo
On May 6, 2015, Harper was traded to the New Orleans VooDoo for future considerations. On July 21, 2015, Harper was placed on reassignment.
