= Brody Eldridge =

American football player (born 1987)

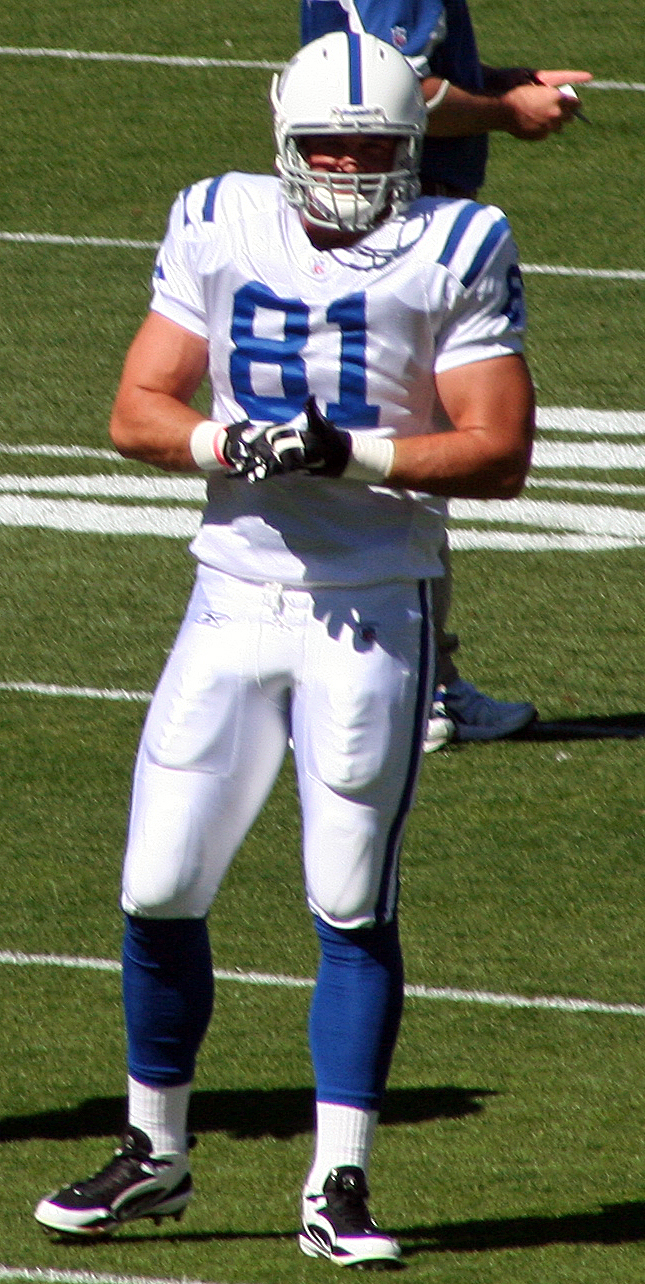
- Eldridge with the Indianapolis Colts in 2010

No. 81
- Position: Tight end

Personal information
- Born: March 31, 1987 (age 39); La Cygne, Kansas, U.S.
- Listed height: 6 ft 5 in (1.96 m)
- Listed weight: 265 lb (120 kg)

Career information
- High school: Prairie View (La Cygne)
- College: Oklahoma
- NFL draft: 2010: 5th round, 162nd overall pick

Career history
- Indianapolis Colts (2010–2012); St. Louis Rams (2012)*; Chicago Bears (2012–2013)
- * Offseason or practice squad member only

Awards and highlights
- Second-team All-Big 12 (2009)

Career NFL statistics
- Games played: 27
- Games started: 16
- Receptions: 14
- Receiving yards: 84
- Stats at Pro Football Reference

William Brody Eldridge (born March 31, 1987) is an American former professional football player who was a tight end in the National Football League (NFL). He played college football for the Oklahoma Sooners. He was a member of the Indianapolis Colts, St. Louis Rams and Chicago Bears.

== Early life ==
Eldridge attended Prairie View High School in La Cygne, Kansas where he played a number of different positions including tight end, linebacker and defensive end. During his junior year, he totaled 130 tackles and eight sacks and also played tight end where he recorded 35 receptions and four touchdowns. For this he garnered All-State Kansas honors. During his senior season, Eldridge broke his ankle in the second game and did not play the rest of the season. Despite this, he was rated the No. 43 strongside defensive end in the country by Rivals.com and No. 16 player in the Midlands by Scout.com. He was eventually recruited by the University of Oklahoma.

== College career ==
Eldridge redshirted the 2005 season but as a Freshman in 2006 he converted to tight end and did most of his work in three-tight end sets or as a blocking back. He was characterized by coaches as one of the top blockers on the team and had three receptions on the season, including a long of 10 yards against Oregon.

As a Sophomore he saw playing time at fullback position where he was an All-Big 12 award winner and had six starts as a tight end, playing in two or three-tight end sets or as a blocking back. He had two receptions for 23 yards against Texas A&M, including a career-long 12-yard catch.

In 2008 as a Junior he continued to play primarily as a blocking tight end and fullback starting the first 4 games of the season before suffering an ankle injury which caused him to miss 3 games. He registered his first career touchdown with a one-yard reception against Oklahoma State and had a season-long 11-yard catch against Missouri in the Big 12 Championship.

As a Senior in 2009, Eldridge started at center, tight end and left guard before suffering a season ending neck injury against Nebraska. He finished the season with 2 receptions for 19 yards.

== Professional career ==
=== Pre-draft ===
Pre-draft measurables
Height	Weight	Arm length	Hand span	40-yard dash	10-yard split	20-yard split	20-yard shuttle	Three-cone drill	Vertical jump	Broad jump	Bench press
6 ft 4 3/4 in (1.95 m)	261 lb (118 kg)	32 1/2 in (0.83 m)	9 5/8 in (0.24 m)	4.72 s	1.63 s	2.65 s	4.44 s	7.27 s	31.5 in (0.80 m)	9 ft 4 in (2.84 m)	20 reps

Eldridge was considered the best blocking tight end in the draft and was thought of as a late-round pick.

=== Indianapolis Colts ===
Eldridge was selected by the Indianapolis Colts in round 5 with the 162nd pick of the 2010 NFL draft. He was the second tight end drafted from the University of Oklahoma that year following Jermaine Gresham in the first round. He agreed to a four-year, $1.95 million contract with the Colts.

Eldridge was waived by the Colts on May 17, 2012.

=== St. Louis Rams ===
On May 18, 2012, Eldridge was claimed by the St. Louis Rams. On July 2, 2012, it was reported that he would be suspended for the first four games of 2012 season due to violating the NFL's policy on performance-enhancing substances. He was able to participate in all offseason and preseason practices and games, but could not be added to the active roster until after facing the Seattle Seahawks on September 30.

=== Chicago Bears ===
On October 15, 2012, Eldridge was signed to the Chicago Bears. On November 13, 2012, Eldridge was released by the Bears to make room for Josh McCown after starting quarterback Jay Cutler suffered a concussion. Eldridge was brought back on January 9, 2013.

Eldridge was waived on August 3, 2013.
