= Keenan Clayton =

American gridiron football player (born 1987)

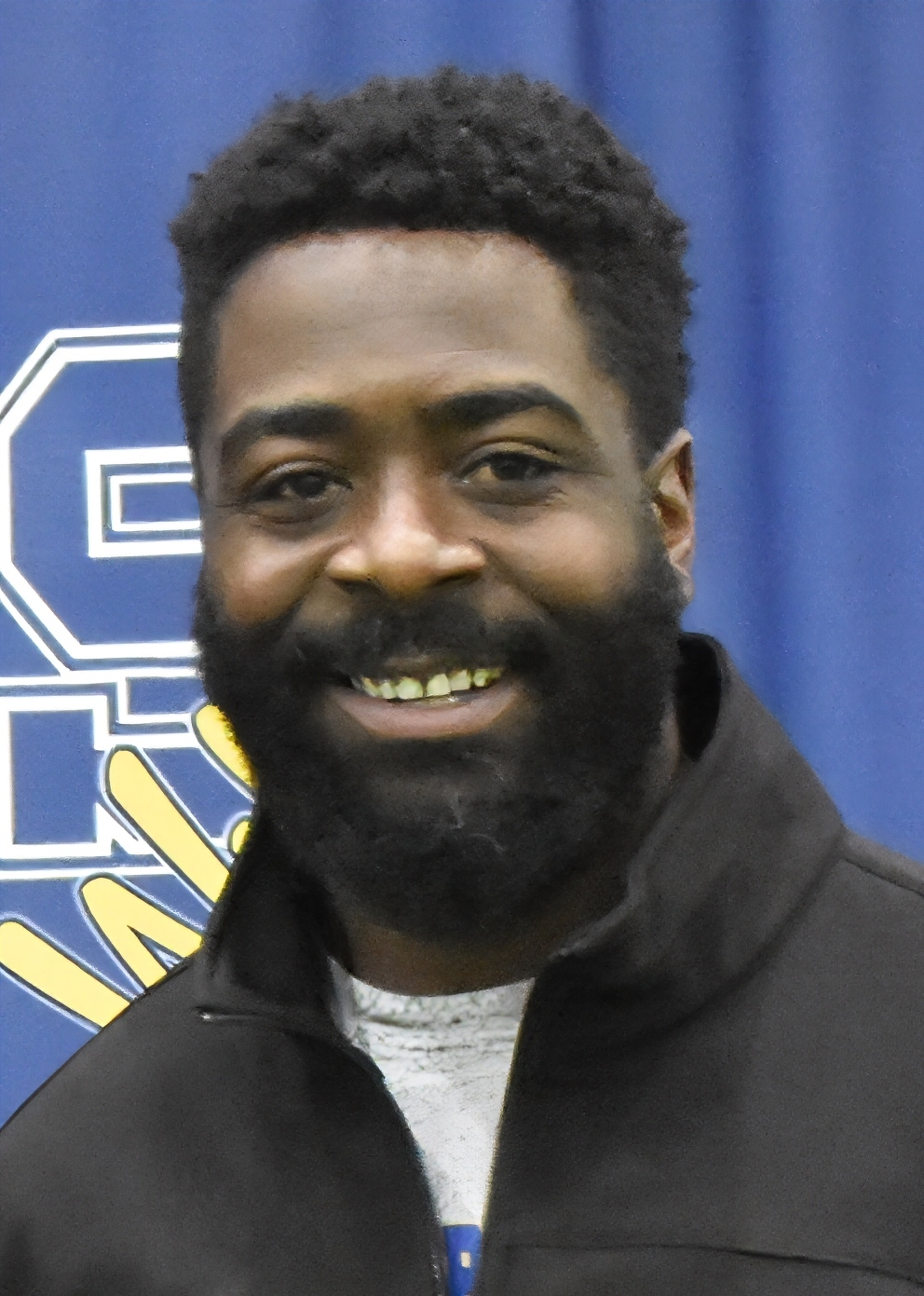
- Clayton in 2022

No. 57
- Position: Linebacker

Personal information
- Born: June 19, 1987 (age 39); Sulphur Springs, Texas, U.S.
- Listed height: 6 ft 2 in (1.88 m)
- Listed weight: 220 lb (100 kg)

Career information
- High school: Sulphur Springs
- College: Oklahoma
- NFL draft: 2010: 4th round, 121st overall pick

Career history
- Philadelphia Eagles (2010–2011); Oakland Raiders (2012); Arizona Cardinals (2014)*; Toronto Argonauts (2014)*
- * Offseason or practice squad member only

Career NFL statistics
- Total tackles: 48
- Stats at Pro Football Reference

Keenan Clayton (born June 19, 1987) is an American former professional football player who was a linebacker in the National Football League (NFL). He was selected by the Philadelphia Eagles in the fourth round of the 2010 NFL draft. He played college football for the Oklahoma Sooners.

== Professional career ==
=== Philadelphia Eagles ===
Clayton was selected by the Philadelphia Eagles in the fourth round (121st overall) of the 2010 NFL draft. He was signed to a four-year contract on June 10, 2010. He was released August 31, 2012.

=== Oakland Raiders ===
On September 1, 2012, Clayton was signed by the Oakland Raiders. On August 25, 2013, he was waived by the Raiders.

=== Arizona cardinals ===
On May 14, 2014, the Arizona Cardinals signed Clayton to a one-year contract. The Cardinals released Clayton on August 25, 2014.

=== Toronto Argonauts ===
On October 7, 2014, Clayton was signed to the practice roster of the Toronto Argonauts of the Canadian Football League. He was released by the Argonauts on October 21, 2014.
