= Quinton Carter =

American football player (born 1988)

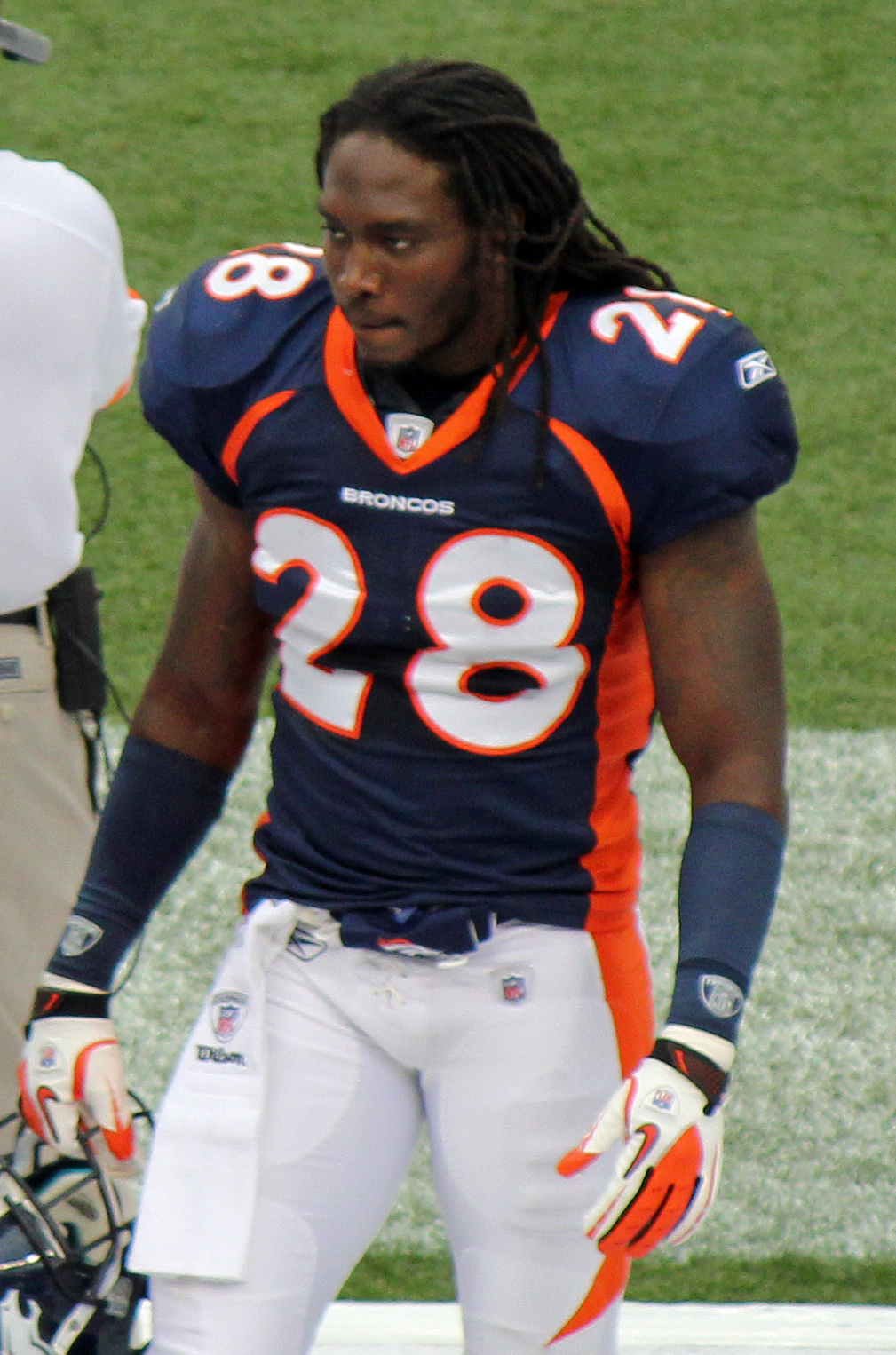
- Carter with the Denver Broncos in 2011

No. 28, 38
- Position: Safety

Personal information
- Born: July 20, 1988 (age 38); Las Vegas, Nevada, U.S.
- Listed height: 6 ft 1 in (1.85 m)
- Listed weight: 200 lb (91 kg)

Career information
- High school: Cheyenne (North Las Vegas, Nevada)
- College: Oklahoma
- NFL draft: 2011: 4th round, 108th overall pick

Career history
- Denver Broncos (2011–2014)

Awards and highlights
- Consensus All-American (2010); First-team All-Big 12 (2010); Second-team All-Big 12 (2009)

Career NFL statistics
- Total tackles: 79
- Sacks: 2
- Forced fumbles: 1
- Stats at Pro Football Reference

Quinton Carter (born July 20, 1988) is an American former professional football player who was a safety in the National Football League (NFL). He played college football for the Oklahoma Sooners, earning consensus All-American honors in 2010. He was selected by the Denver Broncos in the fourth round of the 2011 NFL draft.

== Early life ==
Carter was born in Las Vegas, Nevada. Growing up in the inner-city of North Las Vegas, Carter attended Cheyenne High School where he played the quarterback position in football, throwing for 650-plus yards and eight touchdowns during a regular season. He ran for more than 400 yards and earned all-league honors in his junior year. Considered one of the area's top football and basketball players at Cheyenne, Carter is a member of the Las Vegas Sun's all-decade high school football team.

== College career ==
Carter attended the University of Oklahoma, where he played for coach Bob Stoops's Oklahoma Sooners football team from 2006 to 2010. In 2006, Carter played on Oklahoma's special teams unit in only five games. He became one of the secondary's most physical players and earned one tackle against the UAB Blazers. In 2007, Carter redshirted.

The 2008 season allowed Carter to start for two games at safety, collecting 10 tackles in his first career start against Kansas. He broke up passes playing against Kansas State and Missouri, acquired five tackles against Texas Tech, and in his second start at the Big 12 Championship Game, Carter had eight tackles that resulted in a Big 12 Championship. He led the team with fourteen solo special teams tackles and was third on the team for the same number of special teams tackles.

In 2009, Carter was named All-Big 12 second team by coaches and had an honorable mention by the AP. In this standout year, he started at free safety with eighty stops, becoming the team's second-leading tackler, and tied his career-high ten tackles against both BYU and Texas Tech. Carter recovered a fumble during the BYU game, broke up two passes playing Kansas, and picked off passes against Tulsa, Kansas, and Kansas State. In the Sun Bowl win over Stanford, Carter collected eight tackles and one interception. He ended the season with 88 tackles and four interceptions, placing him on the 2010 Jim Thorpe Watch List, the 2010 All-Big 12 team, and as a nominee for the Lowe's Senior Class Award.

== Professional career ==
Pre-draft measurables
Height	Weight	Arm length	Hand span	Wingspan	40-yard dash	10-yard split	20-yard split	20-yard shuttle	Three-cone drill	Vertical jump	Broad jump	Bench press
6 ft 0 5/8 in (1.84 m)	208 lb (94 kg)	31 1/2 in (0.80 m)	9 1/4 in (0.23 m)	6 ft 4 3/4 in (1.95 m)	4.59 s	1.66 s	2.76 s	4.06 s	7.05 s	34.5 in (0.88 m)	10 ft 1 in (3.07 m)	23 reps
All values from 2011 NFL Scouting Combine

Carter was selected in the fourth round with the 108th pick in the 2011 NFL draft by the Denver Broncos. In the 2011 NFL Season Carter became the Broncos' starting safety next to Brian Dawkins, ahead of 2nd round draft pick Rahim Moore. He would also intercept Ben Roethlisberger in the Broncos' wild card victory over the Steelers, as well as Tom Brady in the divisional round loss. On September 29, 2012 he was placed on Injured Reserve.

=== NFL statistics ===
Year	Team	GP	COMB	TOTAL	AST	SACK	FF	FR	FR YDS	INT	IR YDS	AVG IR	LNG	TD	PD
2011	DEN	16	56	45	11	1.0	0	0	0	0	0	0	0	0	0
2012	DEN	03	02	02	00	0.0	0	0	0	0	0	0	0	0	0
2014	DEN	11	21	17	04	1.0	1	0	0	0	0	0	0	0	1
Career		30	79	64	15	2.0	1	0	0	0	0	0	0	0	1

== Personal life ==
When Carter is not playing football, he spends his time doing charity projects. In 2008, he started Serving Others through Unity and Leadership (SOUL) to help kids in need through football camps and other programs. He also maintains that he does not play video games, which gives him the time to help others. Additionally, Carter has been named to the 2010 Allstate AFCA Good Works team for his work in the community.

On March 9, 2013, Carter was arrested and charged with three acts of fraudulent act in a gaming establishment. Officials at Texas Station alleged that he added money to his wagers after the dice has been rolled in craps. He faced a potential 18 years in prison. The charges were ultimately dropped.

In 2017, Carter opened Big Jerk, a Caribbean restaurant, in Las Vegas. It began as a food truck in 2017 and became a restaurant in 2018. It now has multiple locations in Vegas.
