= Brian Jackson (American football) =

American football player (born 1987)

No. 22
- Position: Cornerback

Personal information
- Born: May 4, 1987 (age 39); DeSoto, Texas, U.S.
- Listed height: 6 ft 0 in (1.83 m)
- Listed weight: 198 lb (90 kg)

Career information
- College: Oklahoma
- NFL draft: 2010: undrafted

Career history
- New York Jets (2010)*; New York Giants (2010); St. Louis Rams (2011)
- * Offseason or practice squad member only

Career NFL statistics
- Total tackles: 11
- Stats at Pro Football Reference

Brian Jackson (born May 4, 1987) is an American former professional football player who was a cornerback in the National Football League (NFL). He was signed as an undrafted free agent by the New York Jets in 2010. He played college football for the Oklahoma Sooners.

He has also played for the New York Giants and St. Louis Rams.
