= Dominique Franks =

American football player (born 1987)

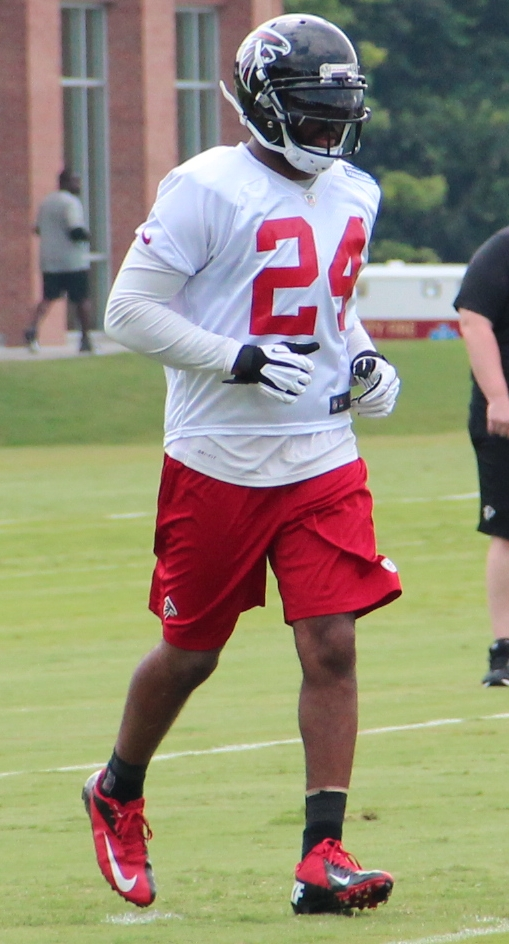
- Franks with the Atlanta Falcons in 2013

Tulsa Golden Hurricane
- Title: Cornerbacks coach

Personal information
- Born: October 8, 1987 (age 39); Tulsa, Oklahoma, U.S.
- Listed height: 6 ft 0 in (1.83 m)
- Listed weight: 197 lb (89 kg)

Career information
- High school: Tulsa (OK) Union
- College: Oklahoma
- NFL draft: 2010: 5th round, 135th overall pick

Career history

Playing
- Atlanta Falcons (2010–2013); Baltimore Ravens (2014); Hudson Valley Fort (2015)

Coaching
- New Jersey Generals (2022) Defensive backs coach; Tulsa (2023–present); Defensive quality control analyst (2023); Cornerbacks coach (2024–present)

Awards and highlights
- Second-team All-Big 12 (2008)

Career NFL statistics
- Total tackles: 48
- Pass deflections: 14
- Interceptions: 3
- Stats at Pro Football Reference

Dominique Franks (born October 8, 1987) is an American football coach and former cornerback who is the cornerbacks coach for Tulsa. He was selected by the Atlanta Falcons in the fifth round of the 2010 NFL draft. Franks played college football at Oklahoma.

== Professional career ==
=== Pre-draft ===
Franks was considered one of the top cornerback prospects for the 2010 NFL draft. Franks announced on January 5, 2010, that he would forgo his senior season and enter the 2010 NFL Draft.

=== Atlanta Falcons ===
Franks was selected by the Atlanta Falcons in the fifth round (135th pick overall) of the 2010 NFL Draft.

=== Baltimore Ravens ===
Franks signed with the Baltimore Ravens on June 19, 2014. He was released on August 30, 2014, with the final round of cuts during the preseason. He re-signed with the team on October 7, 2014. He was released on November 4, 2014, after the signing of Danny Gorrer.

=== Hudson Valley Fort ===
Franks signed with the Hudson Valley Fort of the Fall Experimental Football League (FXFL) in 2015.

== Coaching career ==
=== New Jersey Generals ===
On March 17, 2022, it was announced that Franks was hired as the defensive backs coach of the New Jersey Generals of the United States Football League.
