= Travis Lewis =

American football player (born 1988)

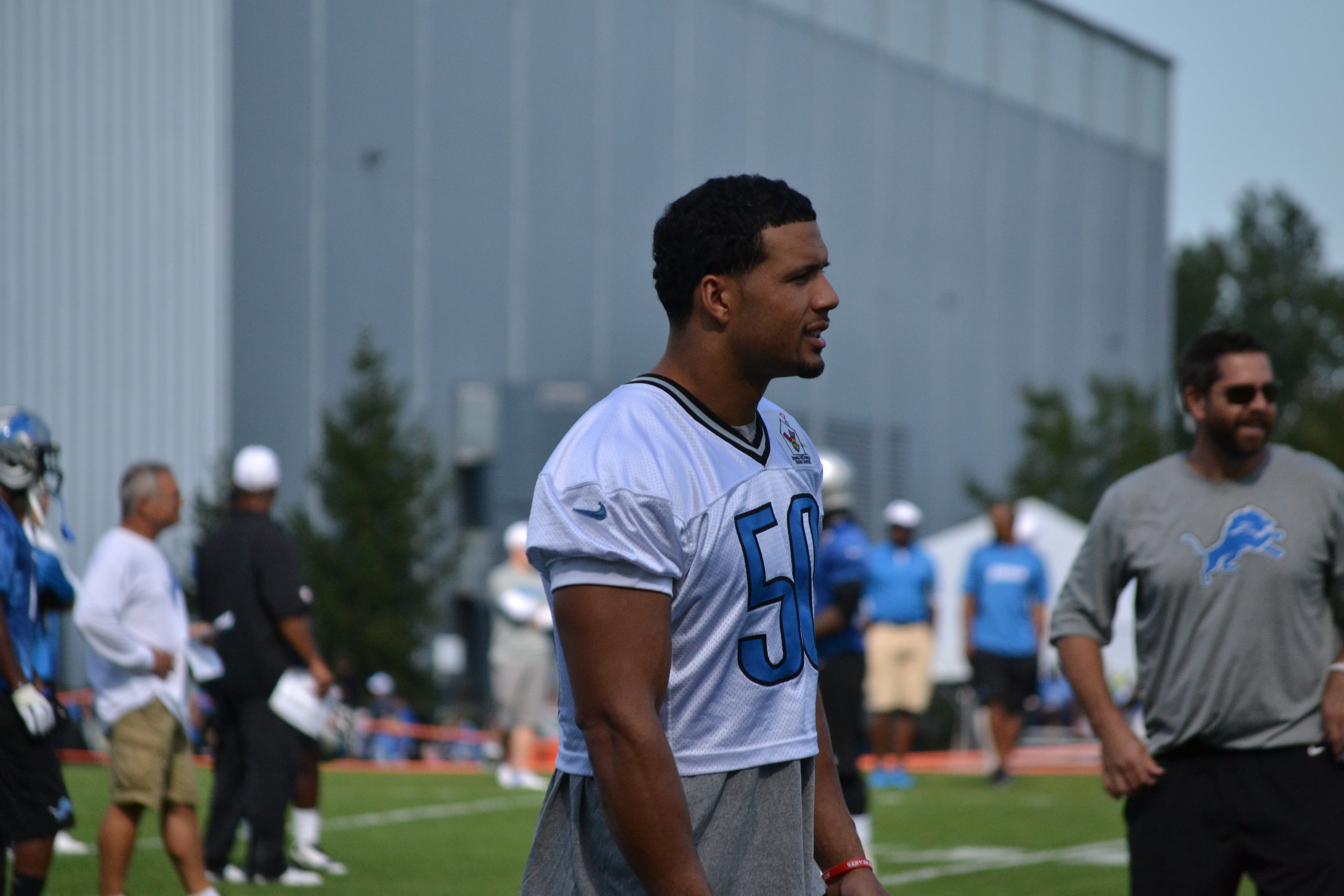
- Lewis at the 2012 Detroit Lions training camp

No. 50
- Position: Linebacker

Personal information
- Born: January 15, 1988 (age 38); San Antonio, Texas, U.S.
- Listed height: 6 ft 2 in (1.88 m)
- Listed weight: 235 lb (107 kg)

Career information
- High school: Lee (San Antonio)
- College: Oklahoma
- NFL draft: 2012: 7th round, 223rd overall pick

Career history
- Detroit Lions (2012–2015); Minnesota Vikings (2016)*
- * Offseason or practice squad member only

Awards and highlights
- Freshman All-American (2008); 2× First-team All-Big 12 (2008, 2009); 2× Second-team All-Big 12 (2010, 2011); Big 12 Defensive Freshman of the Year (2008)

Career NFL statistics
- Total tackles: 32
- Sacks: 1
- Stats at Pro Football Reference

Travis Lewis (born January 15, 1988) is an American former professional football player who was a linebacker in the National Football League (NFL). He played college football for the Oklahoma Sooners, and was selected by the Detroit Lions in the seventh round of the 2012 NFL draft. He also spent time with the Minnesota Vikings during the 2016 offseason.

== Early life ==
A native of San Antonio, Texas, Lewis attended Robert E. Lee High School, where he played football as a linebacker and running back for coach Jimmy Ramos. After switching to tailback as a senior, Lewis rushed for 1,436 yards on 222 carries (6.4 ypc) with nine touchdowns, and also caught 10 passes for 108 yards and a touchdown; for his senior season efforts, Lewis was named all-area and all-metro and was also selected to play at the 2007 U.S. Army All-American Bowl. Following his senior season, he attended the Army combine and Nike camp, where he ran an electronically timed 4.34 in the 40-yard dash, completed the 20-yard shuttle in 4.25 seconds, had 23 reps in the 225-pound bench press and leaped 34 ft 4 in (10.46 m) in the vertical jump. In addition to football, Lewis also competed in track & field in high school as a shot putter (personal-best of 53 ft 10 in (16.41 m). He also benched 335 pounds or 152 kilograms) and squatted 515 pounds (234 kg) in his senior year.

Described as a raw linebacker with great speed and tremendous potential, Lewis received offers from every major program in the entire Big 12, and committed to Nebraska as a junior. However, in the final days and hours before National Letter of Intent Signing Day, Lewis decommitted from Nebraska, and ultimately signed with Oklahoma on February 7, 2007. Rivals.com graded Lewis out as a 4-star (5.8) outside linebacker prospect, ranked 20th at his position, while Scout.com also gave Lewis 4 stars, and rated him the 10th-best middle linebacker. Lewis also had scholarship offers from Missouri, Oklahoma State, and Arizona State, among others.

== College career ==
Lewis broke a couple of Oklahoma freshman records, once established by Brian Bosworth. He eclipsed the mark for most freshman season tackles (144) and most tackles by a freshman in a game (19) against Texas.

Six games into the 2010 season, Lewis led the Sooners with 59 tackles, also registered one interception. He was named a semifinalist for Butkus Award, given annually to the top linebacker in college football.

== Professional career ==
Pre-draft measurables
Height	Weight	Arm length	Hand span	40-yard dash	10-yard split	20-yard split	20-yard shuttle	Three-cone drill	Vertical jump	Broad jump	Bench press
6 ft 1 in (1.85 m)	246 lb (112 kg)	32 3/4 in (0.83 m)	10 1/8 in (0.26 m)	4.75 s	1.65 s	2.78 s	4.22 s	7.27 s	36 in (0.91 m)	10 ft 2 in (3.10 m)	26 reps
All values from NFL Combine except 40 time, short shuttle, 3-cone drill and bench from Pro Day

=== Detroit Lions ===
After his career at Oklahoma, Lewis was selected with the 223rd overall pick in the seventh round of the 2012 NFL draft by the Detroit Lions. Lewis finished his tenure with the Lions with 32 total tackles, 26 of them solo and a sack.

Lewis saw time in his rookie season as a special teamer, contributed primarily on special teams in 13 of the Lions' 16 games. He finished with three special teams tackles on the year, and also saw limited time at linebacker and recorded one solo tackle. After being inactive for three weeks, he returned to action in Week 6 at Philadelphia on special teams. He was credited with two special teams tackles in Week 11 against division rival Green Bay Packers.

Lewis saw action exclusively on special teams in 2013, finishing the season with six special teams tackles. On December 3, 2013, Lewis was suspended for four games by the NFL for violating the league's performance-enhancing substance policy, and therefore was placed on Reserve/Suspended list.

Battling through injuries in his third season in 2014, Lewis served as a core member of the Lions' Special Teams Unit. He had one special teams tackle in Week 2 in the game at Carolina. The following week, he was inactive in Week 3 through Week 7 before being placed on Reserve/Injured list on October 18 with a quad injury.

In 2015, Lewis started 4 games at outside linebacker for the Lions before losing his job to Tahir Whitehead, contributing with a career-high 21 tackles and a sack. He was also among the team's best coverage specialists, playing nearly 72% of the Lions' special teams plays.

=== Minnesota Vikings ===
Lewis signed with the Minnesota Vikings on March 9, 2016, but was waived on June 16, 2016.

=== Retirement ===
On January 12, 2017, Lewis announced his retirement from the NFL.

== Career statistics ==
=== College ===
Regular season statistics				Tackles					Interceptions						Fumbles		
Season	Team	GP	GS	Comb	Total	Ast	Sck	Tfl	PDef	Int	Yds	Avg	Lng	TDs	FF	FR	FR YDS
2008	Oklahoma	12	4	144	70	74	3.5	12.0	3	4	108	27.0	47	0	1	0	0
2009	Oklahoma	12	7	109	56	53	1.0	9.5	2	1	5	5.0	5	0	1	0	0
2010	Oklahoma	14	14	109	63	46	1.5	5.5	5	3	43	14.0	30	0	0	2	0
2011	Oklahoma	13	13	84	54	30	1.0	4.0	2	1	22	22.0	22	0	2	0	0
Totals		54	54	446	243	203	7.0	31.0	12	9	178	19.8	47	0	4	2	0

=== NFL ===
Regular season statistics				Tackles					Interceptions						Fumbles		
Season	Team	GP	GS	Comb	Total	Ast	Sck	Sfty	PDef	Int	Yds	Avg	Lng	TDs	FF	FR	FR YDS
2012	Detroit Lions	13	0	3	2	1	0.0	--	0	0	0	0.0	0	0	0	0	0
2013	Detroit Lions	12	0	6	4	2	0.0	--	0	0	0	0.0	0	0	0	0	0
2014	Detroit Lions	2	0	2	2	0	0.0	--	0	0	0	0.0	0	0	0	0	0
2015	Detroit Lions	15	4	21	18	3	1.0	--	0	0	0	0.0	0	0	0	0	0
Totals		42	4	32	26	6	1.0	--	0	0	0	0.0	0	0	0	0	0
