= Matt Clapp =

American football player (born 1986)

New Orleans Saints
- Positions: Strength and conditioning coach
- Roster status: Practice squad

Personal information
- Born: December 6, 1986 (age 39); Phoenix, Arizona, U.S.
- Listed height: 6 ft 2 in (1.88 m)
- Listed weight: 246 lb (112 kg)

Career information
- High school: Paradise Valley (Phoenix)
- College: Oklahoma
- NFL draft: 2010: undrafted

Career history

Playing
- Detroit Lions (2010–2011)*; Tampa Bay Buccaneers (2011)*
- * Offseason or practice squad member only

Coaching
- Arizona Rattlers (2013) Strength staff; Arizona (2013-2014) Strength staff; Akron (2014-2015) Strength staff; Indiana (2015-2019) Assistant strength and conditioning coach; Alabama (2020-2021) Assistant strength and conditioning coach; New Orleans Saints (2022–present) Strength and conditioning coach

Awards and highlights
- All Big 12 First Team Coaches (2009); All Big 12 Academic First Team (2009)
- Stats at Pro Football Reference

Matt Clapp (born December 6, 1986) is an American former professional football player who was a fullback in the National Football League (NFL). He was signed by the Detroit Lions as an undrafted free agent in 2010. He played college football for the Oklahoma Sooners.

== Professional career ==
=== Detroit Lions ===
Clapp was signed by the Detroit Lions' as an undrafted rookie free agent on April 30, 2010. He was waived by the Lions on September 3, 2011.

=== Tampa Bay Buccaneers ===
Clapp was first signed by the Buccaneers on October 26, 2011. On December 11, 2011, he was suspended for the remainder if the 2011 NFL season and the first four games of the 2012 NFL season for unspecified reasons.
