= 2009 Sun Bowl =

American college football game

2009 Brut Sun Bowl
- 76th Sun Bowl
Oklahoma Sooners	Stanford Cardinal
(7–5)	(8–4)
Big 12	Pac-10
31	27
Head coach: Bob Stoops	Head coach: Jim Harbaugh
	AP / Coaches / BCS; 19 / 21 / 21
	1	2	3	4	Total
Oklahoma	10	7	14	0	31
Stanford	7	17	0	3	27
- Date: December 31, 2009
- Season: 2009
- Stadium: Sun Bowl
- Location: El Paso, Texas
- MVP: Ryan Broyles
- Referee: John O'Neill (Big Ten)
- Halftime show: David Archuleta, Stanford Band, Pride of Oklahoma
- Attendance: 53,713
- Payout: US$1,900,000 per team

United States TV coverage
- Network: CBS
- Announcers: Craig Bolerjack; Steve Beuerlein; Sam Ryan
- Nielsen ratings: 3.3

The 2009 Brut Sun Bowl game was the 76th edition of the annual college football bowl game known as the Sun Bowl. The Oklahoma Sooners defeated the Stanford Cardinal 31–27 on December 31, 2009. It was the two teams' fifth meeting. The game featured two conference tie-ins: the University of Oklahoma represented the Big 12 Conference and Stanford University represented the Pacific-10 Conference. The game was played at the Sun Bowl Stadium on the University of Texas at El Paso campus in El Paso, Texas.

The game featured Stanford's 13th-ranked offense including Toby Gerhart, a Heisman finalist who led the NCAA Division I FBS subdivision with 1,736 rushing yards and 26 touchdowns, against the seventh-ranked Oklahoma defense. The Stanford offense averaged over 440 yards per game while the Oklahoma defense had held its opponents to an average of 273 yards per game. This was the first time the two teams played each other in a bowl game. They had faced each other 4 previous times in the regular season with Oklahoma holding a 3–1 advantage. The last contest played by the schools was a 19–7 victory in Norman, Oklahoma by the Sooners in 1984.

== Team selection ==
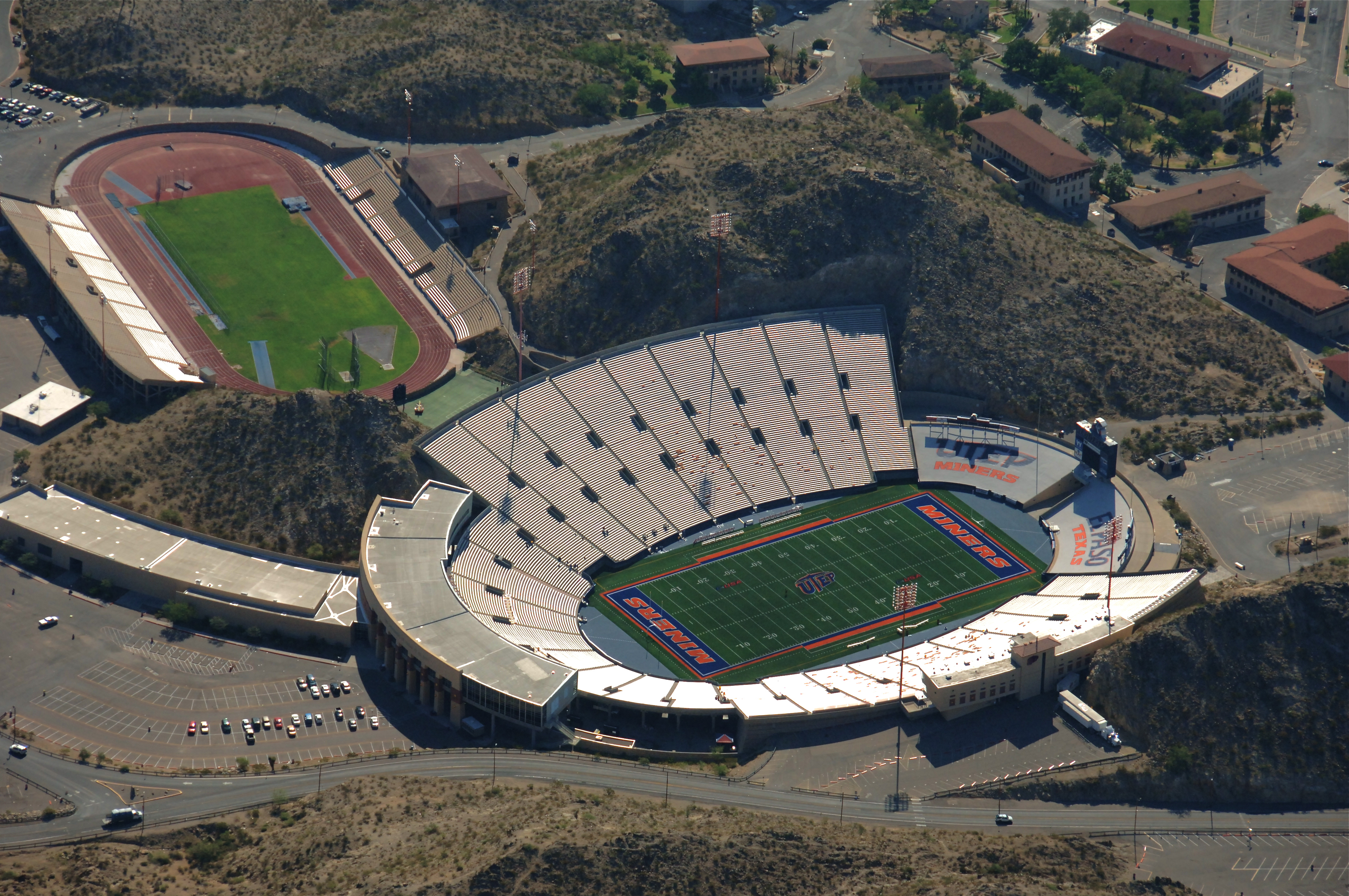
Sun Bowl Stadium, the site of the game.

By contract, the Sun Bowl Association—which produced the game—possessed the third pick from the Pacific-10 Conference. With that pick, the Sun Bowl selected Stanford over Oregon State, as both teams had been in a three-way tie for second place in the conference with Arizona (whom the Holiday Bowl selected with the second pick from the Pac-10).

In 2005, The Sun Bowl and the Gator Bowl agreed to a four-year contract to alternate bids starting with the 2007 game which would prevent repetitive matchups. The Gator Bowl would be allowed to take the Big East's number two team or the Big 12 number three team; however, each conference would have two bids each to the Gator and Sun Bowls over the four years. Since the Gator Bowl had taken a Big 12 team the previous two years, the Sun Bowl was obligated to take a Big 12 team this year. In the Big 12, the Sun Bowl had the fifth pick, following the Alamo Bowl. When the Alamo Bowl chose Texas Tech, the Sun Bowl then selected Oklahoma.

=== Oklahoma ===
The Oklahoma Sooners football team began the 2009 college football season as the reigning Big 12 Conference champions. The Sooners also played in the 2009 BCS National Championship Game against the top-ranked Florida Gators, losing 24–14. Expectations were high for the Sooners as they were returning their Heisman Trophy-winning quarterback Sam Bradford as well as their All-American tight end Jermaine Gresham.

However, before the season began, Gresham suffered a season-ending injury. During the season opener against BYU, Bradford suffered an injury to his shoulder that forced him to sit out the next several games. The Sooners would go on to lose that game and their fourth game against Miami. Bradford returned for game number five against Baylor, but reinjured his shoulder the next week against Texas, ending his season and giving the Sooners their third loss of the season. The Sooners would continue to suffer many injuries throughout the remainder of the season including losing offensive linemen Jarvis Jones and Brody Eldridge, and defensive players Tom Wort, DeMarcus Granger and Auston English for the season. With freshman Landry Jones now leading the offense, the Sooners would go on win every home game from that point forward, including a season-ending win over in-state rival Oklahoma State, extending their NCAA-leading home winning streak to 30 games. However, the Sooners would also lose all but one of their away games. Oklahoma ended the regular season with seven wins and five losses (5–3 in the Big 12). The game marked Oklahoma's third appearance in the Sun Bowl. They were a perfect 2–0 in their previous games. In 1981, they defeated Houston 40–14, and in 1993, they defeated Texas Tech 41–10.

=== Stanford ===
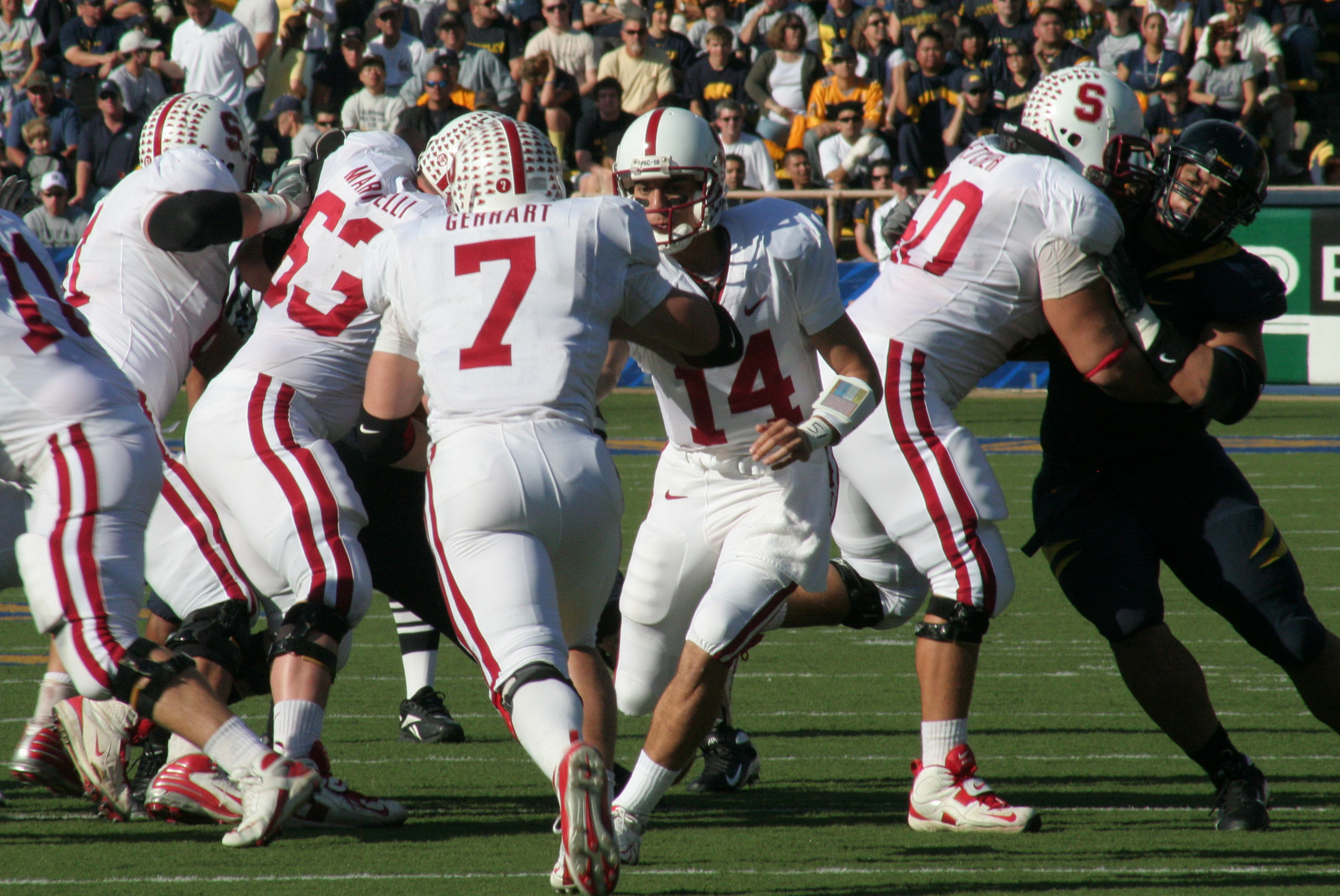
Toby Gerhart taking a hand off from Tavita Pritchard in the 2008 Big Game against California.

Following a 5–7 season in 2008, the expectations for Stanford were considerably lower than that of Oklahoma. In a poll of media members covering the Pac-10 prior to the 2009 season, Stanford was predicted to finish in sixth place.

Stanford's season began as expected with a loss to Wake Forest in the second game of the season. However, the Cardinal's fourth game was against a then-ranked Washington team, in which Stanford won 34–14. A two-game skid to Oregon State and Arizona was a setback for the Cardinal. However, after a bye week in early November, Stanford knocked off top-10 ranked (and eventual Pac-10 champions) Oregon 51–42 thanks to a school-record 223 yards rushing by Toby Gerhart. The next week, after earning their first ranking of the season, the 25th-ranked Cardinal defeated the defending Pac-10 champions and 14th-ranked USC 55–21, the most points ever given up by USC in its history. A subsequent loss to California knocked them out of the rankings but a season-closing victory over Notre Dame brought them back into the ratings at number 19. Stanford ended the regular season 8–4 (6–3 in the Pac-10, for a three-way tie for second place). This was Stanford's third appearance in the Sun Bowl. Just like their opponent, they were 2–0 in Sun Bowl games prior to the 2009 game, with a 24–14 victory over LSU in the 1977 game and a 38–0 shutout over Michigan State in the 1996 contest.

== Game summary ==
Sooners wide receiver Ryan Broyles set a Sun Bowl record with three touchdown receptions, quarterback Landry Jones passed for 418 yards and Oklahoma slowed Toby Gerhart just enough to beat Stanford. Jones took over as Oklahoma's quarterback after 2008 Heisman Trophy winner Sam Bradford was injured in an opening loss to BYU. Broyles finished with 156 yards receiving and set Oklahoma's single-game record with 13 receptions in front of a Sun Bowl record crowd of 53,713.

Gerhart, who led the nation with 1,736 yards rushing, ran for 135 on 32 carries and scored two TDs in the first half. Tavita Pritchard went 8 for 19 for 118 yards and two interceptions filling in for Stanford starting QB, Andrew Luck. Stanford was making its first bowl appearance since losing to Georgia Tech in the 2001 Seattle Bowl.

=== Scoring summary ===
Scoring Play	Score
1st Quarter
OU — Ryan Broyles 30-yard pass from Landry Jones (Patrick O'Hara kick), 12:37	OU 7–0
ST — Owen Marecic 1-yard rush (Nate Whitaker kick), 6:21	TIE 7–7
OU — Patrick O'Hara 28-yard field goal, 0:57	OU 10–7
2nd Quarter
ST — Toby Gerhart 19-yard rush (Nate Whitaker kick), 11:52	ST 14–10
OU — Ryan Broyles 13-yard pass from Landry Jones (Patrick O'Hara kick), 9:57	OU 17–14
ST — Toby Gerhart 16-yard rush, fumbled, recovered by himself in endzone (Nate Whitaker kick), 6:19	ST 21–17
ST — Nate Whitaker 35-yard field goal, 3:57	ST 24–17
3rd Quarter
OU — Ryan Broyles 6-yard pass from Landry Jones (Patrick O'Hara kick), 13:06	TIE 24–24
OU — DeMarco Murray 1-yard rush (Patrick O'Hara kick), 2:59	OU 31–24
4th Quarter
ST — Nate Whitaker 21-yard field goal, 12:43	OU 31–27
