= 2010 Oklahoma Sooners football team =

American college football season

2010 Oklahoma Sooners football

Big 12 champion Big 12 South Division co-champion Fiesta Bowl champion

Big 12 Championship, W 23–20 vs. Nebraska

Fiesta Bowl, W 48–20 vs. Connecticut
- Conference: Big 12 Conference
- South

Ranking
- Coaches: No. 6
- AP: No. 6
- Record: 12–2 (6–2 Big 12)
- Head coach: Bob Stoops (12th season)
- Offensive coordinator: Kevin Wilson (9th season; first 13 games)
- Co-offensive coordinators: Josh Heupel (interim; bowl game); Jay Norvell (interim; bowl game)
- Offensive scheme: No-huddle spread
- Defensive coordinator: Brent Venables (12th season)
- Base defense: 4–3
- Captains: Jeremy Beal; Landry Jones; Travis Lewis
- Home stadium: Gaylord Family Oklahoma Memorial Stadium (Capacity: 82,112)

2010 Big 12 Conference football standings
	Conf.			Overall
Team	W		L	W		L
North Division
No. 20 Nebraska xy	6	–	2	10	–	4
No. 18 Missouri x	6	–	2	10	–	3
Kansas State	3	–	5	7	–	6
Iowa State	3	–	5	5	–	7
Colorado	2	–	6	5	–	7
Kansas	1	–	7	3	–	9
South Division
No. 6 Oklahoma xy$	6	–	2	12	–	2
No. 13 Oklahoma State x	6	–	2	11	–	2
No. 19 Texas A&M x	6	–	2	9	–	4
Baylor	4	–	4	7	–	6
Texas Tech	3	–	5	8	–	5
Texas	2	–	6	5	–	7
Championship: Oklahoma 23, Nebraska 20
$ – BCS representative as conference champion; x – Division champion/co-champions; y – Championship game participant; Rankings from AP Poll

The 2010 Oklahoma Sooners football team represented the University of Oklahoma in the 2010 NCAA Division I FBS football season, the 116th season of Sooner football. The team was led by two-time Walter Camp Coach of the Year Award winner, Bob Stoops, in his 12th season as head coach. They played their home games at Gaylord Family Oklahoma Memorial Stadium in Norman, Oklahoma. They were a charter member of the Big 12 Conference.

Conference play began with a win in the annual Red River Rivalry over the Texas Longhorns on October 2, and concluded with a win over the Nebraska Cornhuskers in the Big 12 Championship Game on December 4. The Sooners finished the regular season with an 11–2 record (6–2 in Big 12) while winning their seventh Big 12 title and their 43rd conference title overall. They received an automatic berth to the Fiesta Bowl, where they defeated Connecticut, 48–20.

Following the season, DeMarco Murray was selected in the 3rd round of the 2011 NFL draft, Quinton Carter in the 4th, and Jonathan Nelson and Jeremy Beal in the 7th.

== Recruits ==
College recruiting
Name	Hometown	School	Height	Weight	40^{‡}	Commit date
Blake Bell; QB	Wichita, Kansas	Bishop Carroll Catholic HS	6 ft 6 in (1.98 m)	210 lb (95 kg)	4.75	Apr 3, 2009
Blake Bell; QB	Recruit ratings: Scout: Rivals: (81)					
Brennan Clay; RB	San Diego, California	Scripps Ranch HS	6 ft 0 in (1.83 m)	190 lb (86 kg)	4.45	Jun 5, 2009
Brennan Clay; RB	Recruit ratings: Scout: Rivals: (81)					
Aaron Colvin; DB	Owasso, Oklahoma	Owasso HS	6 ft 0 in (1.83 m)	180 lb (82 kg)	4.42	Jun 27, 2009
Aaron Colvin; DB	Recruit ratings: Scout: Rivals: (78)					
Rashod Favors; LB	Fort Worth, Texas	Dunbar HS	6 ft 2 in (1.88 m)	215 lb (98 kg)	4.5	Aug 31, 2009
Rashod Favors; LB	Recruit ratings: Scout: Rivals: (78)					
Roy Finch; RB	Niceville, Florida	Niceville Senior HS	5 ft 8 in (1.73 m)	170 lb (77 kg)	4.45	Jun 26, 2009
Roy Finch; RB	Recruit ratings: Scout: Rivals: (79)					
Aaron Franklin; LB	Marshall, Texas	Marshall HS	6 ft 1 in (1.85 m)	206 lb (93 kg)	4.5	Aug 7, 2009
Aaron Franklin; LB	Recruit ratings: Scout: Rivals: (79)					
Trey Franks; ATH	Orange, Texas	West Orange-Stark HS	5 ft 9 in (1.75 m)	172 lb (78 kg)	4.4	Jul 22, 2009
Trey Franks; ATH	Recruit ratings: Scout: Rivals: (78)					
Geneo Grissom; DE	Hutchinson, Texas	Hutchinson HS	6 ft 4 in (1.93 m)	225 lb (102 kg)	N/A	Jan 20, 2010
Geneo Grissom; DE	Recruit ratings: Scout: Rivals: (79)					
Quentin Hayes; DB	Lancaster, Texas	Lancaster HS	6 ft 1 in (1.85 m)	175 lb (79 kg)	4.4	Apr 14, 2009
Quentin Hayes; DB	Recruit ratings: Scout: Rivals: (81)					
James Haynes; DB	Orange, Texas	West Orange-Stark HS	6 ft 0 in (1.83 m)	181 lb (82 kg)	4.36	Jul 22, 2009
James Haynes; DB	Recruit ratings: Scout: Rivals: (79)					
Austin Haywood; TE	Moore, Oklahoma	Southmoore HS	6 ft 4 in (1.93 m)	245 lb (111 kg)	4.8	Nov 2, 2008
Austin Haywood; TE	Recruit ratings: Scout: Rivals: (82)					
Eric Humphrey; DT	Dallas, Texas	Parish Episcopal School	6 ft 4 in (1.93 m)	273 lb (124 kg)	N/A	Jan 6, 2010
Eric Humphrey; DT	Recruit ratings: Scout: Rivals: (80)					
Bronson Irwin; OL	Mustang, Oklahoma	Mustang HS	6 ft 4 in (1.93 m)	322 lb (146 kg)	N/A	Mar 12, 2009
Bronson Irwin; OL	Recruit ratings: Scout: Rivals: (79)					
Tony Jefferson; DB	Chula Vista, California	Eastlake HS	6 ft 0 in (1.83 m)	196 lb (89 kg)	4.5	Dec 18, 2009
Tony Jefferson; DB	Recruit ratings: Scout: Rivals: (84)					
Justin McCay; ATH	Shawnee Mission, Kansas	Bishop Miege HS	6 ft 3 in (1.91 m)	197 lb (89 kg)	4.5	Aug 12, 2009
Justin McCay; ATH	Recruit ratings: Scout: Rivals: (80)					
Sheldon McClain; WR	Cibolo, Texas	Steele HS	6 ft 2 in (1.88 m)	174 lb (79 kg)	4.48	May 12, 2009
Sheldon McClain; WR	Recruit ratings: Scout: Rivals: (80)					
Trey Millard; TE	Columbia, Missouri	Rock Bridge Sr. HS	6 ft 2 in (1.88 m)	245 lb (111 kg)	4.5	Aug 24, 2009
Trey Millard; TE	Recruit ratings: Scout: Rivals:					
Chuka Ndulue; DE	Dallas, Texas	Jesuit College Prep School	6 ft 3 in (1.91 m)	240 lb (110 kg)	N/A	May 22, 2009
Chuka Ndulue; DE	Recruit ratings: Scout: Rivals: (78)					
Corey Nelson; LB	Dallas, Texas	Skyline HS	6 ft 1 in (1.85 m)	200 lb (91 kg)	4.58	Feb 3, 2010
Corey Nelson; LB	Recruit ratings: Scout: Rivals: (81)					
Daniel Noble; DT	Flower Mound, Texas	Marcus HS	6 ft 4 in (1.93 m)	275 lb (125 kg)	4.85	Jan 29, 2009
Daniel Noble; DT	Recruit ratings: Scout: Rivals: (79)					
Torrea Peterson; DT	San Antonio, Texas	East Central HS	6 ft 4 in (1.93 m)	300 lb (140 kg)	5.1	Jun 25, 2009
Torrea Peterson; DT	Recruit ratings: Scout: Rivals: (79)					
Joe Powell; ATL	Dallas, Texas	Skyline HS	5 ft 11 in (1.80 m)	174 lb (79 kg)	4.49	Mar 4, 2009
Joe Powell; ATL	Recruit ratings: Scout: Rivals: (78)					
Adam Shead; OL	Cedar Hill, Texas	Cedar Hill HS	6 ft 4 in (1.93 m)	315 lb (143 kg)	N/A	May 12, 2009
Adam Shead; OL	Recruit ratings: Scout: Rivals: (78)					
Kenny Stills; WR	Carlsbad, California	La Costa Canyon HS	6 ft 2 in (1.88 m)	175 lb (79 kg)	4.4	Dec 18, 2009
Kenny Stills; WR	Recruit ratings: Scout: Rivals: (79)					
Tyrus Thompson; OL	Pflugerville, Texas	Pflugerville HS	6 ft 6 in (1.98 m)	278 lb (126 kg)	5.0	Feb 22, 2009
Tyrus Thompson; OL	Recruit ratings: Scout: Rivals: (80)					
Damon Williams; DT	Irving, Texas	Nimitz HS	6 ft 4 in (1.93 m)	300 lb (140 kg)	N/A	Jan 4, 2010
Damon Williams; DT	Recruit ratings: Scout: Rivals: (68)					
Daryl Williams; OL	Corinth, Texas	Lake Dallase, HS	6 ft 5 in (1.96 m)	269 lb (122 kg)	4.9	Oct 11, 2009
Daryl Williams; OL	Recruit ratings: Scout: Rivals: (77)					
Julian Wilson; ATH	Moore, Oklahoma	Southmoore HS	6 ft 2 in (1.88 m)	172 lb (78 kg)	4.4	Jul 7, 2009
Julian Wilson; ATH	Recruit ratings: Scout: Rivals: (79)					
Austin Woods; OL	Rockwall, Texas	Rockwall-Heath HS	6 ft 5 in (1.96 m)	290 lb (130 kg)	N/A	Jul 1, 2009
Austin Woods; OL	Recruit ratings: Scout: Rivals: (78)					
Overall recruit ranking:
‡ Refers to 40-yard dash; Note: In many cases, Scout, Rivals, 247Sports, On3, and ESPN may conflict in their listings of height, weight and 40 time.; In these cases, the average was taken. ESPN grades are on a 100-point scale.; Sources: "Oklahoma 2010 Football Commitments". Rivals.; "2010 Player Commitments – Oklahoma". ESPN.; "2010 Team Ranking". Rivals.com.

== Schedule ==
Date	Time	Opponent	Rank	Site	TV	Result	Attendance
September 4	6:00 p.m.	Utah State*	No. 7	Gaylord Family Oklahoma Memorial Stadium; Norman, OK	PPV	W 31–24	85,151
September 11	2:30 p.m.	No. 17 Florida State*	No. 10	Gaylord Family Oklahoma Memorial Stadium; Norman, OK	ABC/ESPN2	W 47–17	85,630
September 18	2:30 p.m.	Air Force*	No. 7	Gaylord Family Oklahoma Memorial Stadium; Norman, OK	FSN	W 27–24	84,332
September 25	5:00 p.m.	at Cincinnati*	No. 8	Paul Brown Stadium; Cincinnati, OH	ESPN2	W 31–29	58,253
October 2	2:30 p.m.	vs. No. 21 Texas	No. 8	Cotton Bowl; Dallas, TX (Red River Rivalry)	ABC/ESPN	W 28–20	96,009
October 16	6:00 p.m.	Iowa State^{†}	No. 6	Gaylord Family Oklahoma Memorial Stadium; Norman, OK	FSN	W 52–0	84,024
October 23	7:00 p.m.	at No. 18 Missouri	No. 3	Faurot Field; Columbia, MO (rivalry) (College GameDay)	ABC	L 27–36	71,004
October 30	8:15 p.m.	Colorado	No. 11	Gaylord Family Oklahoma Memorial Stadium; Norman, OK	ESPN2	W 43–10	84,173
November 6	6:00 p.m.	at Texas A&M	No. 11	Kyle Field; College Station, TX	FSN	L 19–33	81,392
November 13	2:30 p.m.	Texas Tech	No. 19	Gaylord Family Oklahoma Memorial Stadium; Norman, OK	ABC	W 45–7	85,116
November 20	7:00 p.m.	at Baylor	No. 16	Floyd Casey Stadium; Waco, TX	ESPN2	W 53–24	36,034
November 27	7:00 p.m.	at No. 10 Oklahoma State	No. 14	Boone Pickens Stadium; Stillwater, OK (Bedlam Series) (College GameDay)	ABC	W 47–41	51,164
December 4	7:00 p.m.	vs. No. 13 Nebraska	No. 10	Cowboys Stadium; Arlington, TX (Big 12 Championship Game / rivalry)	ABC	W 23–20	78,802
January 1, 2011	7:30 p.m.	vs. No. 25 Connecticut*	No. 9	University of Phoenix Stadium; Glendale, AZ (Fiesta Bowl)	ESPN	W 48–20	67,232
*Non-conference game; ^{†}Homecoming; Rankings from AP Poll released prior to the game; All times are in Central time

== Roster ==
2010 Oklahoma Sooners football team roster
Players
Coaches
Offense

Pos.	#	Name	Class
WR	3	Joe Powell	Fr
WR	4	Kenny Stills	Fr
QB	5	John Nimmo	Sr
WR	6	Cameron Kenney	Sr
RB	7	DeMarco Murray	Sr
WR	8	Brandon Caleb	Sr
WR	9	Trey Franks	Fr
QB	10	Blake Bell	Fr
QB	11	Ben Sherrard	So
QB	12	Landry Jones (C)	So
WR	14	John Sosanya	So
QB	15	Drew Allen	Fr
WR	16	Jaz Reynolds	So
RB	17	Mossis Madu	Sr
WR	18	Justin McCay	Fr
WR	19	Ryan Caro	Jr
RB	21	Brennan Clay	Fr
RB	22	Roy Finch	Fr
RB	23	Jermie Calhoun	So
WR	24	Dejuan Miller	Jr
RB	26	Jonathan Miller	So
WR	27	Derek Hellard	So
RB	31	Dominique Whaley	So
FB	32	Marshall Musil	Fr
TE/HB	33	Trey Millard	Fr
RB	34	John Weakley	So
TE	41	Josh New	Jr
TE	47	Trent Ratterree	Jr
FB	48	Brandon Crow	Sr
OL	50	Austin Woods	Fr
OL	51	Brian Lepak	Sr
OL	59	Donald Stephenson	Jr
OL	61	Ben Habern	So
OL	64	Gabe Ikard	Fr
OL	65	Kyle Callison	So
OL	66	Christian Peterson	So
OL	68	Bronson Irwin	Fr
OL	69	Eric Mensik	Sr
OL	70	Cory Brandon	Sr
OL	71	Tyrus Thompson	Fr
OL	72	Tavaris Jeffries	Sr
OL	73	Josh Aladenoye	Fr
OL	74	Adam Shead	Fr
OL	75	Tyler Evans	So
OL	76	Jarvis Jones	Jr
OL	77	Stephen Good	Jr
OL	78	Jake Reed	Fr
OL	79	Daryl Williams	Fr
WR	80	Joshua Neal	Jr
WR	81	Nyko Symonds	Fr
TE	82	James Hanna	Jr
WR	83	Mark Long	So
WR	85	Ryan Broyles	Jr
TE	87	Lane Johnson	So
WR	88	Sheldon McClain	Fr
TE	89	Austin Haywood	Fr

Defense

Pos.	#	Name	Class
DB	1	Tony Jefferson	Fr
DB	2	Julian Wilson	Fr
DB	3	Jonathan Nelson	Sr
DB	5	Joseph Ibiloye	So
LB	7	Corey Nelson	Fr
DB	8	James Haynes	Fr
DB	9	Gabe Lynn	Fr
LB	10	Rashod Favors	Fr
DB	11	Kevin Brent	Fr
LB	12	Austin Box	Jr
DB	13	Marcus Trice	So
DB	14	Aaron Colvin	Fr
DB	15	Lamar Harris	So
DB	19	Demontre Hurst	So
DB	20	Quinton Carter	Sr
LB	21	Tom Wort	Fr
DB	25	Emmanuel Jones	Sr
DB	27	Sam Proctor	Jr
LB	28	Travis Lewis (C)	Jr
DB	29	Quentin Hayes	Fr
DB	29	Zach Brown	Jr
DB	30	Javon Harris	So
DB	31	Daniel Franklin	So
DB	32	Jamell Fleming	Jr
DE	34	Billy Batchlear	Sr
DB	38	Derrick Bradley	So
DB	39	Dillon Schooley	Fr
LB	40	Aaron Franklin	Fr
LB	41	Erik Lee	Fr
DB	42	Jesse Paulsen	So
DB	43	Jesse Bell	Jr
DE	44	Jeremy Beal (C)	Sr
LB	45	Caleb Gastelum	Fr
DB	46	Jordan Finch	Fr
DB	47	Zach Montana	So
DT	52	Damon Williams	Fr
DT	53	Casey Walker	So
LB	55	Jaydan Bird	So
LB	56	Ronnell Lewis	So
LB	57	Kale Sawatzky	Fr
DT	58	Eric Humphrey	Fr
DE	62	David Driskill	Fr
DE	67	Matt Wilson	Jr
DE	81	Jarrett Brown	Fr
DE	84	Frank Alexander	Jr
DE	85	Geneo Grissom	Fr
DT	86	Adrian Taylor	Sr
DE	90	David King	So
DE	91	R. J. Washington	So
DE	92	Stacy McGee	So
DT	93	Daniel Noble	Fr
DE	94	Pryce Macon	Sr
DT	95	Justin Chaisson	Fr
DT	96	Torrea Peterson	Fr
DT	97	Jamarkus McFarland	So
DE	98	Chuka Ndulue	Fr
DT	99	Drew Serruto	So

Special teams

Pos.	#	Name	Class
K	17	Jimmy Stevens	Jr
P	36	Tress Way	So
K	37	Matthew Moreland	Sr
K	43	Patrick O'Hara	So
DS	52	Wade Sheppard	Fr
DS	54	Sean Morrison	Jr
DS	86	James Winchester	Jr
K	94	Bryce Easley	Fr

Head coach

- Bob Stoops (12th season)

Coordinators/assistant coaches

- Kevin Wilson (9th season) – Offensive coordinator/tight ends/Fullbacks
- Brent Venables (12th season) – Associate head coach/defensive coordinator/linebackers
- Bobby Jack Wright (12th season) – Assistant Head Coach/Co-defensive Coordinator/defensive backs
- Cale Gundy (12th season) – Recruiting Coordinator/running backs
- Jay Norvell # (3rd season) – Assistant Offensive coordinator/wide receivers
- James Patton (5th season) – Offensive line
- Josh Heupel # (6th season) – Quarterbacks
- Willie Martinez (1st season) – Defensive backs
- Jackie Shipp (12th season) – Defensive line
- Jerry Schmidt (5th season) – Director of Sports Enhancement

# Heupel and Norvell took over Coordinator Duties for Wilson during bowl game

Legend

- (C) Team captain
- (S) Suspended
- (I) Ineligible
- Injured
- Redshirt

Roster
Last update: 2010-08-16

== Game summaries ==
=== Utah State ===
Utah State Aggies at #7 Oklahoma Sooners

Team	1	2	3	4	Total
Utah State	0	10	14	0	24
• #7 Oklahoma	14	7	10	0	31

- Date: September 4
- Location: Gaylord Family Oklahoma Memorial Stadium, Norman, Oklahoma
- Game start: 6:00 p.m. CDT
- Elapsed time: 3:18
- Game attendance: 85,151
- Game weather: 84 °F (29 °C), clear, winds S 6 mph
- Referee: Mike Defee
- TV announcers (FSN): Bill Jones (Play-by-play), Dean Blevins (Color) & Elissa Walker-Campbell (Sideline)

=== Florida State ===
#17 Florida State Seminoles at #10 Oklahoma Sooners

Team	1	2	3	4	Total
#17 Florida State	7	0	0	10	17
• #10 Oklahoma	14	20	10	3	47

- Date: September 11
- Location: Gaylord Family Oklahoma Memorial Stadium, Norman, Oklahoma
- Game start: 2:30 p.m. CDT
- Elapsed time: 3:43
- Game attendance: 85,630
- Game weather: 82 °F (28 °C), clear, winds NNE 17 mph
- Referee: Jack Childress
- TV announcers (ABC/ESPN2): Sean McDonough (Play-by-play), Matt Millen (Color) & Jeannine Edwards (Sideline)

=== Air Force ===
Air Force Falcons at #7 Oklahoma Sooners

Team	1	2	3	4	Total
Air Force	3	0	7	14	24
• #7 Oklahoma	7	3	17	0	27

- Date: September 18
- Location: Gaylord Family Oklahoma Memorial Stadium, Norman, Oklahoma
- Game start: 2:30 p.m. CDT
- Elapsed time: 3:16
- Game attendance: 84,332
- Game weather: 91 °F (33 °C), partly cloudy, winds SSE 12 mph
- Referee: Land Clark
- TV announcers (FSN): Joel Meyers (Play-by-play), Joel Klatt (Color) & Jim Knox (Sideline)

=== Cincinnati ===
#8 Oklahoma Sooners at Cincinnati Bearcats

Team	1	2	3	4	Total
• #8 Oklahoma	14	3	7	7	31
Cincinnati	3	6	3	17	29

- Date: September 25
- Location: Paul Brown Stadium, Cincinnati
- Game start: 5:00 p.m. CDT
- Elapsed time: 3:42
- Game attendance: 58,253
- Game weather: 75 °F (24 °C), fair, winds WNW 10 mph
- Referee: Scott Novak
- TV announcers (ESPN2): Mark Jones (Play-by-play) & Bob Davie (Color)

=== Texas (Red River Rivalry) ===
#8 Oklahoma Sooners (4–0) vs. #21 Texas Longhorns (3–1)

Quarter	1	2	3	4	Total
Texas	7	0	3	10	20
Oklahoma	14	7	0	7	28

at Cotton Bowl • Dallas, Texas

- Date: October 2
- Game time: 2:30 p.m. CDT
- Game weather: Clear • 81 °F (27 °C) • Wind 7 NNW
- Game attendance: 96,009
- Referee: Tom Walker
- TV announcers (ABC/ESPN): Brad Nessler, Todd Blackledge, and Holly Rowe
- Box Score

Game information

Texas

- Garrett Gilbert
  27/41, 266 Yds, INT
- D.J. Monroe
  4 Rush, 65 Yds, TD
- James Kirkendoll
  8 Rec, 87 Yds

Oklahoma

- Landry Jones
  24/39, 236 Yds, 2 TD
- DeMarco Murray
  25 Rush, 115 Yds, 2 TD
- Kenny Stills
  5 Rec, 78 Yds, TD

Scoring summary

Quarter	Time	Drive			Team	Scoring information	Score	
Quarter	Time	Plays	Yards	TOP	Team	Scoring information	TEX	OU
1	10:51	13	83	4:09	Oklahoma	Murray 18-yard touchdown run, Stevens kick good	0	7
1	5:29	11	75	3:13	Oklahoma	Stills 16-yard touchdown reception from Jones, Stevens kick good	0	14
1	3:46	4	75	1:37	Texas	Monroe 60-yard touchdown run, Tucker kick good	7	14
2	7:19	8	48	3:15	Oklahoma	Hanna 2-yard touchdown reception from Jones, Stevens kick good	7	21
3	9:35	13	71	5:20	Texas	22-yard field goal by Tucker	10	21
4	12:54	8	54	2:48	Oklahoma	Murray 20-yard touchdown run, Stevens kick good	10	28
4	9:52	9	76	2:57	Texas	C. Johnson 5-yard touchdown run, Tucker kick good	17	28
4	1:39	5	42	0:58	Texas	21-yard field goal by Tucker	20	28
"TOP" = time of possession. For other American football terms, see Glossary of American football.							20	28

=== Iowa State ===
Iowa State Cyclones at #6 Oklahoma Sooners

Team	1	2	3	4	Total
Iowa State	0	0	0	0	0
• #6 Oklahoma	10	21	14	7	52

- Date: October 16
- Location: Gaylord Family Oklahoma Memorial Stadium, Norman, Oklahoma
- Game start: 6:00 p.m. CDT
- Elapsed time: 3:15
- Game attendance: 84,024
- Game weather: 82 °F (28 °C), partly cloudy, winds SSE 12 mph
- Referee: Cooper Castleberry
- TV announcers (FSN): Bill Land (Play-by-play), Joel Klatt (Color) & Emily Jones (Sideline)

=== Missouri ===
#3 Oklahoma Sooners at #18 Missouri Tigers

Team	1	2	3	4	Total
#3 Oklahoma	7	7	7	6	27
• #18 Missouri	7	10	3	16	36

- Date: October 23
- Location: Faurot Field, Columbia, Missouri
- Game start: 7:00 p.m. CDT
- Elapsed time: 3:35
- Game attendance: 71,004
- Game weather: 72 °F (22 °C), light rain, winds S 9 mph
- Referee: Greg Burks
- TV announcers (ABC): Brent Musburger (Play-by-play), Kirk Herbstreit (Color) & Erin Andrews (Sideline)

=== Colorado ===
Colorado Buffaloes at #11 Oklahoma Sooners

Team	1	2	3	4	Total
Colorado	0	3	7	0	10
• #11 Oklahoma	3	26	14	0	43

- Date: October 30
- Location: Gaylord Family Oklahoma Memorial Stadium, Norman, Oklahoma
- Game start: 8:15 p.m. CDT
- Elapsed time: 3:18
- Game attendance: 84,173
- Game weather: 70 °F (21 °C), clear, winds ESE 7 mph
- Referee: Rick Loumiet
- TV announcers (ESPN2): Carter Blackburn (Play-by-play), Mike Bellotti (Color) & Brock Huard (Color)

=== Texas A&M ===
#11 Oklahoma Sooners at Texas A&M Aggies

Team	1	2	3	4	Total
#11 Oklahoma	0	0	17	2	19
• Texas A&M	9	3	7	14	33

- Date: November 6
- Location: Kyle Field, College Station, Texas
- Game start: 6:00 p.m. CDT
- Elapsed time: 3:41
- Game attendance: 81,392
- Game weather: 64 °F (18 °C), clear, winds SE 4 mph
- Referee: Scott Novak
- TV announcers (FSN): Steve Physioc (Play-by-play), Joel Klatt (Color) & Jim Knox (Sideline)

=== Texas Tech ===
Texas Tech Raiders at #19 Oklahoma Sooners

Team	1	2	3	4	Total
Texas Tech	7	0	0	0	7
• #19 Oklahoma	24	14	7	0	45

- Date: November 13
- Location: Gaylord Family Oklahoma Memorial Stadium, Norman, Oklahoma
- Game start: 2:30 p.m. CST
- Elapsed time: 3:24
- Game attendance: 85,116
- Game weather: 55 °F (13 °C), sunny, winds NW 10 mph
- Referee: Mike Defee
- TV announcers (ABC): Carter Blackburn (Play-by-play), Mike Bellotti (Color) & Brock Huard (Color)

=== Baylor ===
#16 Oklahoma Sooners at Baylor Bears

Team	1	2	3	4	Total
• #16 Oklahoma	21	13	19	0	53
Baylor	0	7	3	14	24

- Date: November 20
- Location: Floyd Casey Stadium, Waco, Texas
- Game start: 7:00 p.m. CST
- Elapsed time: 3:24
- Game attendance: 36,034
- Game weather: 70 °F (21 °C), clear, winds S 13 mph
- Referee: Scott Novak
- TV announcers (ESPN2): Ron Franklin (Play-by-play) & Ed Cunningham (Color)

=== Oklahoma State (Bedlam Series) ===
#14 Oklahoma Sooners at #10 Oklahoma State Cowboys

Team	1	2	3	4	Total
• #14 Oklahoma	7	17	0	23	47
#10 Oklahoma State	3	14	7	17	41

- Date: November 27
- Location: Boone Pickens Stadium, Stillwater, Oklahoma
- Game start: 7:00 p.m. CST
- Elapsed time: 3:38
- Game attendance: 51,164
- Game weather: 50 °F (10 °C), clear, winds SE 7 mph
- Referee: Greg Burks
- TV announcers (ABC): Brent Musburger (Play-by-play), Kirk Herbstreit (Color) & Erin Andrews (Sideline)

Scoring summary
1	6:50	OU	Trey Millard 6-yard run (Jimmy Stevens kick)	OU 7-0
1	3:29	OSU	Dan Bailey 23-yard field goal	OU 7-3
2	13:29	OU	Ryan Broyles 2-yard pass from Landry Jones (Jimmy Stevens kick)	OU 14-3
2	11:06	OSU	Shaun Lewis 52-yard interception return (Dan Bailey kick)	OU 14-10
2	6:44	OU	Cameron Kenney 8-yard pass from Landry Jones (Jimmy Stevens kick)	OU 21-10
2	1:08	OU	Jeremy Smith 2-yard run (Dan Bailey kick)	OU 21-17
2	0:00	OU	Jimmy Stevens 29-yard field goal	OU 24-17
3	11:54	OSU	Josh Cooper 20-yard pass from Brandon Weeden (Dan Bailey kick)	Tied 24-24
4	14:25	OU	Jimmy Stevens 24-yard field goal	OU 27-24
4	7:38	OU	Jimmy Stevens 31-yard field goal	OU 30-24
4	5:53	OU	Jimmy Stevens 26-yard field goal	OU 33-24
4	4:06	OSU	Justin Blackmon 15-yard pass from Brandon Weeden (Dan Bailey kick)	OU 33-31
4	3:03	OU	Cameron Kenney 86-yard pass from Landry Jones (Jimmy Stevens kick)	OU 40-31
4	2:51	OSU	Justin Gilbert 89-yard kickoff return (Dan Bailey kick)	OU 40-38
4	2:34	OU	James Hanna 76-yard pass from Landry Jones (Jimmy Stevens kick)	OU 47-38
4	0:36	OSU	Dan Bailey 34-yard field goal	OU 47-41

The 105th Bedlam game was played in Stillwater, Oklahoma in front of 51,164 people. #9 Oklahoma State was looking to beat #13 Oklahoma and break their seven-year Bedlam losing streak. This was only the fourth time in the entire series that OSU came into the game ranked higher than OU, the last time coming in the previous season.

The game began with Oklahoma receiving the kickoff. After a punt by each team, OU had the ball back on their own 18 yard-line. The Sooners went on an 82-yard drive that was highlighted by an 18-yard rush by senior running back DeMarco Murray and a 25-yard pass from sophomore quarterback Landry Jones to junior WR Ryan Broyles, and ended with a 6-yard TD run by freshman FB Trey Millard. A few drives later, Oklahoma State was on the board with a 23-yard field goal by senior kicker Dan Bailey, and the first quarter would end with Oklahoma up 7–3. A drive that started in the first quarter ended with Jones throwing a 2-yard TD pass to Broyles. On the next drive, OSU junior QB Brandon Weeden was intercepted by senior DB Quinton Carter at the Oklahoma 45 yard-line. But just three plays later, Jones was intercepted by freshman LB Shaun Lewis, who would take it back 52 yards for a Cowboy TD. Several drives later and a TD by each team, the half would end with OU up, 24–17. The third quarter was the lowest scoring of the four, with the lone score by Oklahoma State coming on the first drive. This was an 8-play, 80-yard drive capped off with a 20-yard pass from Weeden to junior WR Josh Cooper for the TD. The fourth quarter began with the teams tied at 24. The Sooners scored three field goals to put them up by nine, and then madness ensued. After a one-minute-46-second drive, OSU would score a TD that would begin a 92-second period where two touchdowns were scored by each team. The first came by the Cowboys on their drive, and the next on an 86-yard pass from Jones to WR Cameron Kenney. Oklahoma State kick returner Justin Gilbert would return the ensuing kickoff 89 yards for a TD, and then on the very next drive, Jones would throw yet another long TD pass, this one for 76 yards to junior TE James Hanna. OSU was only able to get a field goal, and after a failed onside kick, Oklahoma ended the game with a thrilling 47–41 victory.

Oklahoma QB Landry Jones' 468 yards, 86-yard long, 37 completions and 62 attempts were all career highs, and his four touchdowns were tied for the second most of his career, but his three interceptions were the second most of his career, and his 57.1% completion was his second worst of the season. RB Roy Finch's 16 rush attempts were tied for the most of his career, and wide receiver Cameron Kenney's 6 receptions, 141 yards and two touchdowns were all career highs.

=== Nebraska (Big 12 Championship) ===
#10 Oklahoma Sooners vs. #13 Nebraska Cornhuskers

Team	1	2	3	4	Total
• #10 Oklahoma	0	17	3	3	23
#13 Nebraska	10	10	0	0	20

- Date: December 4
- Location: Cowboys Stadium, Arlington, Texas
- Game start: 7:00 p.m. CST
- Elapsed time: 3:37
- Game attendance: 78,802
- Game weather: Indoors
- Referee: Scott Novak
- TV announcers (ABC): Brent Musburger (Play-by-play), Kirk Herbstreit (Color) & Holly Rowe (Sideline)

Scoring summary
1	8:39	NEB	Roy Helu 66-yard run (Alex Henery kick)	NEB 7-0
1	6:11	NEB	Alex Henery 53-yard field goal	NEB 10-0
2	12:14	NEB	Kyle Reed 5-yard pass from Rex Burkhead (Alex Henery kick)	NEB 17-0
2	11:02	OU	Kenny Stills 49-yard pass from Landry Jones (Jimmy Stevens kick)	NEB 17-7
2	2:35	OU	Jimmy Stevens 26-yard field goal	NEB 17-10
2	1:37	OU	Landry Jones 1-yard run (Jimmy Stevens kick)	Tied 17-17
2	0:06	NEB	Alex Henery 42-yard field goal	NEB 20-17
3	7:04	OU	Jimmy Stevens 20-yard field goal	Tied 20-20
4	8:28	OU	Jimmy Stevens 27-yard field goal	OU 23-20

=== Connecticut (Fiesta Bowl) ===
#25 Connecticut Huskies vs. #9 Oklahoma Sooners

Team	1	2	3	4	Total
#25 Connecticut	0	10	10	0	20
• #9 Oklahoma	14	6	14	14	48

- Date: January 1
- Location: University of Phoenix Stadium, Glendale, Arizona
- Game start: 7:30 p.m. CST
- Elapsed time: 3:34
- Game attendance: 67,232
- Game weather: Indoors
- Referee: Jay Stricherz
- TV announcers (ESPN): Sean McDonough (Play-by-play), Matt Millen (Color) & Heather Cox (Sideline)

Scoring summary
1	10:09	OU	James Hanna 8-yard pass from Landry Jones (Jimmy Stevens kick)	OU 7-0
1	0:24	OU	DeMarco Murray 3-yard run (Jimmy Stevens kick)	OU 14-0
2	12:58	CONN	Dwayne Gratz 46-yard interception return (Dave Teggart kick)	OU 14-7
2	9:57	OU	Jimmy Stevens 41-yard field goal	OU 17-7
2	2:05	OU	Jimmy Stevens 24-yard field goal	OU 20-7
2	0:26	CONN	Dave Teggart 37-yard field goal	OU 20-10
3	10:55	OU	Cameron Kenney 59-yard pass from Landry Jones (Jimmy Stevens kick)	OU 27-10
3	9:44	OU	Jamell Fleming 55-yard interception return (Jimmy Stevens kick)	OU 34-10
4	9:30	CONN	Robbie Frey 95-yard kickoff return (Dave Teggart kick)	OU 34-17
4	5:04	CONN	Dave Teggart 38-yard field goal	OU 34-20
4	7:49	OU	Ryan Broyles 5-yard pass from Landry Jones (Jimmy Stevens kick)	OU 41-20
4	2:40	OU	Tony Jefferson 22-yard interception return (Jimmy Stevens kick)	OU 48-20

== Rankings ==
Ranking movements Legend: ██ Increase in ranking ██ Decrease in ranking ( ) = First-place votes
	Week															
Poll	Pre	1	2	3	4	5	6	7	8	9	10	11	12	13	14	Final
AP	7 (1)	10	7	8	8	6	6 (2)	3 (3)	11	11	19	16	14	10	9	6
Coaches	8	10	9	9	8	7	6	3 (4)	11	9	16	14	13	9	8	6
Harris	Not released						6 (2)	4 (4)	11	9	16	14	13	9	9	Not released
BCS	Not released							1	9	8	16	14	13	9	7	Not released

== Statistics ==
=== Team ===
	OU	Opp
Points per Game	37.2	21.8
First downs	371	248
Rushing	130	111
Passing	217	121
Penalty	24	16
Rushing Yardage	1,932	2,085
Rushing Attempts	578	504
Avg per Rush	3.3	4.1
Avg per Game	138.0	148.9
Passing Yardage	4,807	2,981
Avg per Game	343.4	212.9
Completions-Attempts	414-633 (65.4%)	271-496 (54.6%)
Total Offense	6,739	5,066
Total Plays	1,211	1,000
Avg per Play	5.6	5.1
Avg per Game	481.4	361.9
Fumbles-Lost	23-6	28-13

	OU	Opp
Punts-Yards	73-3,212 (44 avg)	99-4,153 (41.9 avg)
Punt returns-Total Yards	38-323 (8.5 avg)	24-73 (3 avg)
Kick returns-Total Yards	42-935 (22.3 avg)	81-1,745 (21.5 avg)
Onside Kicks	0-1 (0%)	0-2 (0%)
Avg Time of Possession per Game	30:18	29:38
Penalties-Yards	72-592	102-851
Avg per Game	42.3	60.8
3rd Down Conversions	109/245 (44.5%)	79/235 (33.6%)
4th Down Conversions	14/27 (51.6%)	9/20 (45%)
Sacks By-Yards	37-276	21-197
Total TDs	64	35
Rushing	23	14
Passing	38	15
Fields Goals-Attempts	23-29 (79.3%)	20-24 (83.3%)
PAT-Attempts	62-63 (98.4%)	33-34 (97.1%)
Total Attendance	508,426	297,847
Games-Avg per Game	6-84,738	5-59,569

=== Scores by quarter ===
	1	2	3	4	Total
Opponents	56	73	64	112	305
Oklahoma	149	161	139	72	521

== 2011 NFL draft ==
The 2011 NFL draft was held on April 28–30, 2011 at Radio City Music Hall in New York City. The following Oklahoma players were either selected or signed as undrafted free agents following the draft.

Player	Position	Round	Overall pick	NFL team
DeMarco Murray	RB	3rd	71	Dallas Cowboys
Quinton Carter	DB	4th	108	Denver Broncos
Jonathan Nelson	DB	7th	229	St. Louis Rams
Jeremy Beal	DE	7th	247	Denver Broncos
Adrian Taylor	DT	Undrafted		Houston Texans
Brandon Caleb	WR	Undrafted		Philadelphia Eagles
Cameron Kenney	WR	Undrafted		San Diego Chargers
Eric Mensik	OL	Undrafted		Arizona Cardinals
Cory Brandon	OT	Undrafted		Tampa Bay Buccaneers
Mossis Madu	RB	Undrafted		Tampa Bay Buccaneers
