= 2008 Oklahoma Sooners football team =

American college football season

2008 Oklahoma Sooners football

Big 12 champion Big 12 South Division co-champion

Big 12 Championship Game, W 62–21 vs. Missouri

BCS National Championship Game, L 14–24 vs. Florida
- Conference: Big 12 Conference
- South

Ranking
- Coaches: No. 5
- AP: No. 5
- Record: 12–2 (7–1 Big 12)
- Head coach: Bob Stoops (10th season)
- Offensive coordinator: Kevin Wilson (7th season)
- Offensive scheme: No-huddle spread
- Defensive coordinator: Brent Venables (10th season)
- Base defense: 4–3
- Captains: Sam Bradford; Jon Cooper; Brody Eldridge; Nic Harris; Gerald McCoy
- Home stadium: Gaylord Family Oklahoma Memorial Stadium

2008 Big 12 Conference football standings
	Conf.			Overall
Team	W		L	W		L
North Division
No. 19 Missouri xy	5	–	3	10	–	4
Nebraska x	5	–	3	9	–	4
Kansas	4	–	4	8	–	5
Colorado	2	–	6	5	–	7
Kansas State	2	–	6	5	–	7
Iowa State	0	–	8	2	–	10
South Division
No. 5 Oklahoma xy$	7	–	1	12	–	2
No. 4 Texas x%	7	–	1	12	–	1
No. 12 Texas Tech x	7	–	1	11	–	2
No. 16 Oklahoma State	5	–	3	9	–	4
Baylor	2	–	6	4	–	8
Texas A&M	2	–	6	4	–	8
Championship: Oklahoma 62, Missouri 21
$ – BCS representative as conference champion; % – BCS at-large representative; x – Division champion/co-champions; y – Championship game participant; Rankings from AP Poll

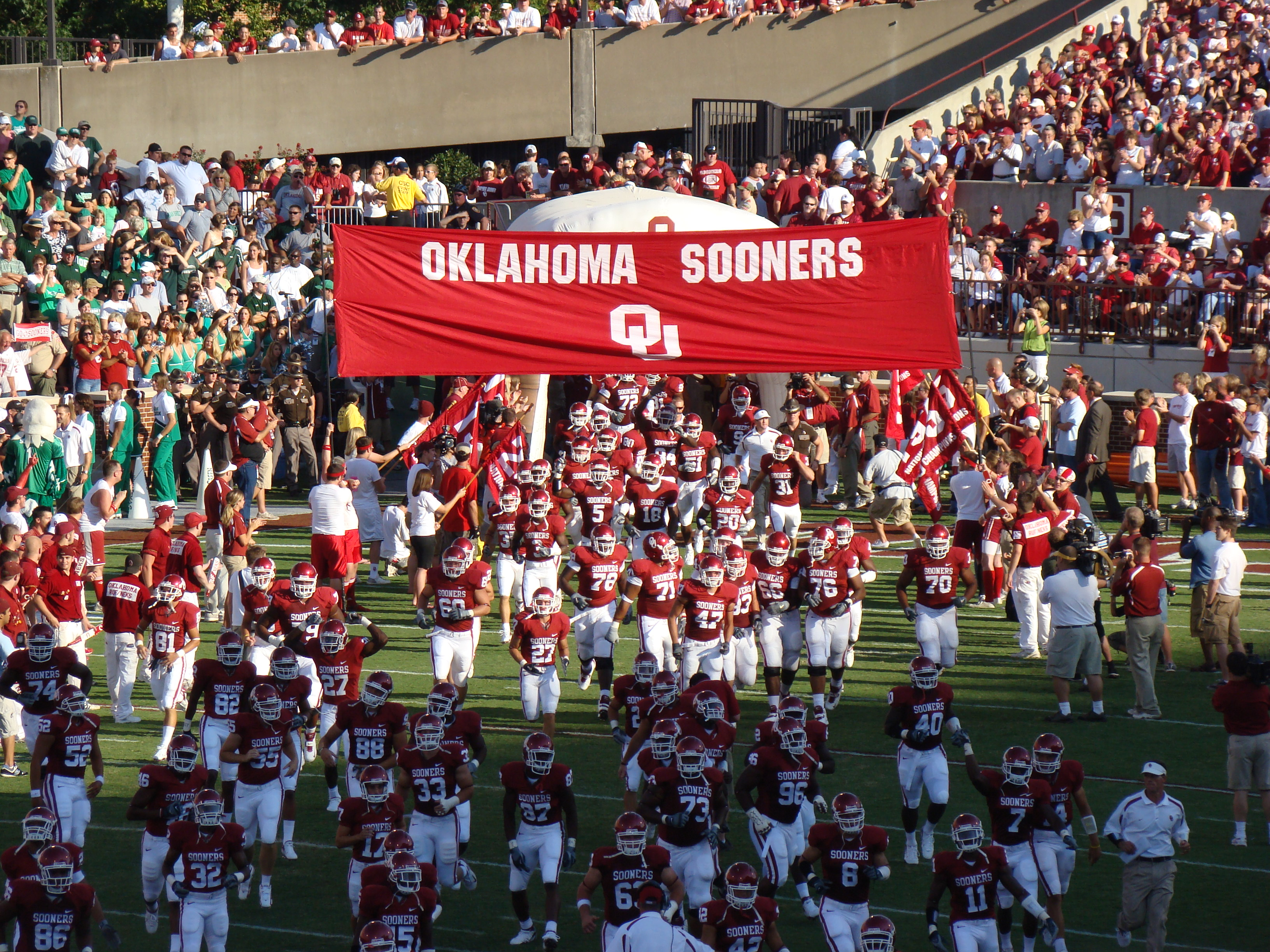
The Sooners run onto the field for the first time in the 2007 season.

The 2008 Oklahoma Sooners football team represented the University of Oklahoma in the 2008 NCAA Division I FBS football season, the 114th season of Sooner football. The team was led by two-time Walter Camp Coach of the Year Award winner, Bob Stoops, in his 10th season as head coach. They played their homes games at Gaylord Family Oklahoma Memorial Stadium in Norman, Oklahoma. They were a charter member of the Big 12 Conference.

Conference play began with a win over the Baylor Bears in Waco, Texas on October 4, and ended with a win over the Missouri Tigers in the Big 12 Championship Game on December 9. The Sooners finished the regular season with a 12–1 record (7–1 in Big 12) while winning their sixth Big 12 title and their 42nd conference title overall. They were invited to the BCS National Championship Game, where they lost to the Florida Gators, 24–14. Oklahoma scored 716 points during the course of their entire season, setting an NCAA Division I record (later broken by Florida State in 2013) for most points scored in a single season. This is Oklahoma's most recent appearance in a national championship game to date.

The Sooners were led on offense by sophomore quarterback Sam Bradford, who became the fifth Oklahoma player to win the Heisman Trophy, distinguishing him as the best player in college football. Bradford led the nation in passing touchdowns (50) and passer efficiency rating (180.8). Bradford squared off against 2007 Heisman winner Tim Tebow in the BCS National Championship Game, which was the second time in history that two Heisman winners played each other in a game, after Matt Leinart and Jason White met in the 2005 Orange Bowl.

Following the season, Phil Loadholt was selected in the 2nd round of the 2009 NFL draft, Juaquin Iglesias was drafted in the 3rd, Nic Harris and Duke Robinson were chosen in the 5th, and Manuel Johnson in the 7th.

== Recruits ==
On March 6, 2008, 4-star wide receiver Joshua Jarboe, who was deemed to be one of the recruits who could start playing immediately in the fall, was arrested for receiving stolen property and possessing a weapon at his DeKalb County high school. Jarboe could have faced expulsion under school policy for these felony charges, but did not. Already on thin ice for the weapons possession, he was kicked off the team in June for making a violent rap video on YouTube that described him carrying and using a gun.

College recruiting
Name	Hometown	School	Height	Weight	40^{‡}	Commit date
Mike Balogun; LB	Upper Marlboro, Maryland	Lackawanna CC	6 ft 2 in (1.88 m)	250 lb (110 kg)	N/A	Jan 20, 2008
Mike Balogun; LB	Recruit ratings: Scout: Rivals:					
J.R. Bryant; LB	Jesup, Georgia	Garden City CC	6 ft 3 in (1.91 m)	230 lb (100 kg)	4.48	Jan 25, 2008
J.R. Bryant; LB	Recruit ratings: Scout: Rivals:					
Jermie Calhoun; RB	Ben Wheeler, Texas	Van HS	6 ft 0 in (1.83 m)	210 lb (95 kg)	4.62	Mar 10, 2007
Jermie Calhoun; RB	Recruit ratings: Scout: Rivals: (90)					
Daniel Franklin; WLB	Mount Airy, Georgia	Habersham Central HS	6 ft 3 in (1.91 m)	220 lb (100 kg)	4.60	Dec 6, 2006
Daniel Franklin; WLB	Recruit ratings: Scout: Rivals: (81)					
Stephen Good; OL	Paris, Texas	Paris HS	6 ft 5 in (1.96 m)	305 lb (138 kg)	N/A	Feb 12, 2007
Stephen Good; OL	Recruit ratings: Scout: Rivals: (82)					
Ben Habern; C	Argyle, Texas	Liberty Christian HS	6 ft 3 in (1.91 m)	260 lb (120 kg)	4.90	Apr 4, 2006
Ben Habern; C	Recruit ratings: Scout: Rivals: (79)					
James Hanna; TE	Flower Mound, Texas	Flower Mound HS	6 ft 4 in (1.93 m)	215 lb (98 kg)	4.53	Jun 7, 2007
James Hanna; TE	Recruit ratings: Scout: Rivals: (80)					
Lamar Harris; DB	Gilmer, Texas	Gilmer HS	6 ft 2 in (1.88 m)	180 lb (82 kg)	N/A	Jan 31, 2008
Lamar Harris; DB	Recruit ratings: Scout: Rivals: (80)					
Joseph Ibiloye; LB	Garland, Texas	South Garland HS	6 ft 4 in (1.93 m)	205 lb (93 kg)	4.56	Jun 4, 2007
Joseph Ibiloye; LB	Recruit ratings: Scout: Rivals: (80)					
Josh Jarboe; WR	Decatur, Georgia	Cedar Grove HS	6 ft 3 in (1.91 m)	195 lb (88 kg)	N/A	Jan 5, 2008
Josh Jarboe; WR	Recruit ratings: Scout: Rivals: (86)					
Justin Johnson; RB	Gilmer, Texas	Gilmer HS	6 ft 1 in (1.85 m)	210 lb (95 kg)	4.50	Feb 3, 2007
Justin Johnson; RB	Recruit ratings: Scout: Rivals: (81)					
Landry Jones; QB	Artesia, New Mexico	Artesia HS	6 ft 4 in (1.93 m)	210 lb (95 kg)	4.70	Mar 28, 2007
Landry Jones; QB	Recruit ratings: Scout: Rivals: (81)					
David King; DE	Houston, Texas	Strake Jesuit College Prep	6 ft 4 in (1.93 m)	240 lb (110 kg)	4.70	May 31, 2007
David King; DE	Recruit ratings: Scout: Rivals: (74)					
Stacy McGee; DL	Muskogee, Oklahoma	Muskogee HS	6 ft 4 in (1.93 m)	260 lb (120 kg)	N/A	Jan 15, 2008
Stacy McGee; DL	Recruit ratings: Scout: Rivals: (79)					
Dejuan Miller; WR	Metuchen, New Jersey	Metuchen HS	6 ft 5 in (1.96 m)	200 lb (91 kg)	4.60	Jun 7, 2007
Dejuan Miller; WR	Recruit ratings: Scout: Rivals: (80)					
Britt Mitchell; OT	Roscoe, Texas	Roscoe HS	6 ft 6 in (1.98 m)	320 lb (150 kg)	N/A	Mar 18, 2007
Britt Mitchell; OT	Recruit ratings: Scout: Rivals: (78)					
Jameel Owens; WR	Muskogee, Oklahoma	Muskogee HS	6 ft 3 in (1.91 m)	200 lb (91 kg)	N/A	Jan 15, 2008
Jameel Owens; WR	Recruit ratings: Scout: Rivals: (82)					
David Sims; DB	Oroville, California	Butte	5 ft 11 in (1.80 m)	200 lb (91 kg)	4.38	Jan 27, 2008
David Sims; DB	Recruit ratings: Scout: Rivals:					
Casey Walker; DT	Garland, Texas	Garland HS	6 ft 3 in (1.91 m)	285 lb (129 kg)	5.22	Jun 7, 2007
Casey Walker; DT	Recruit ratings: Scout: Rivals: (77)					
R. J. Washington; DE	Keller, Texas	Fossil Ridge HS	6 ft 4 in (1.93 m)	242 lb (110 kg)	4.78	Nov 26, 2006
R. J. Washington; DE	Recruit ratings: Scout: Rivals: (87)					
Tress Way; K	Tulsa, Oklahoma	Union HS	6 ft 1 in (1.85 m)	190 lb (86 kg)	N/A	Jun 24, 2007
Tress Way; K	Recruit ratings: Scout: Rivals: (45)					
Overall recruit ranking: Scout: 13 Rivals: 5
‡ Refers to 40-yard dash; Note: In many cases, Scout, Rivals, 247Sports, On3, and ESPN may conflict in their listings of height, weight and 40 time.; In these cases, the average was taken. ESPN grades are on a 100-point scale.; Sources: "Oklahoma 2008 Football Commitments". Rivals.; "2008 Oklahoma Commits". Scout.; "2008 Player Commitments – Oklahoma". ESPN.; "Scout.com Team Recruiting Rankings". Scout.; "2008 Team Ranking". Rivals.com.

== Schedule ==
Date	Time	Opponent	Rank	Site	TV	Result	Attendance
August 30	6:00 p.m.	Chattanooga*	No. 4	Gaylord Family Oklahoma Memorial Stadium; Norman, OK	FSN, PPV	W 57–2	84,715
September 6	2:30 p.m.	Cincinnati*	No. 4	Gaylord Family Oklahoma Memorial Stadium; Norman, OK	ABC	W 52–26	84,476
September 13	6:45 p.m.	at Washington*	No. 3	Husky Stadium; Seattle, WA	ESPN	W 55–14	67,716
September 27	6:00 p.m.	No. 24 TCU*	No. 2	Gaylord Family Oklahoma Memorial Stadium; Norman, OK	FSN	W 35–10	85,158
October 4	11:30 a.m.	at Baylor	No. 1	Floyd Casey Stadium; Waco, TX	FSN	W 49–17	37,145
October 11	11:00 a.m.	vs. No. 5 Texas	No. 1	Cotton Bowl; Dallas, TX (Red River Rivalry, College GameDay)	ABC	L 35–45	92,182
October 18	2:30 p.m.	No. 16 Kansas^{†}	No. 4	Gaylord Family Oklahoma Memorial Stadium; Norman, OK	ABC	W 45–31	85,241
October 25	11:30 a.m.	at Kansas State	No. 4	Bill Snyder Family Football Stadium; Manhattan, KS	FSN	W 58–35	47,054
November 1	7:00 p.m.	Nebraska	No. 4	Gaylord Family Oklahoma Memorial Stadium; Norman, OK (rivalry)	ESPN	W 62–28	85,212
November 8	2:30 p.m.	at Texas A&M	No. 6	Kyle Field; College Station, TX	ABC	W 66–28	85,603
November 22	7:00 p.m.	No. 2 Texas Tech	No. 5	Gaylord Family Oklahoma Memorial Stadium; Norman, OK (College GameDay)	ABC	W 65–21	85,646
November 29	7:00 p.m.	at No. 11 Oklahoma State	No. 3	Boone Pickens Stadium; Stillwater, OK (Bedlam Series, College GameDay)	ABC	W 61–41	49,031
December 6	7:00 p.m.	vs. No. 19 Missouri	No. 4	Arrowhead Stadium; Kansas City, MO (Big 12 Championship Game, rivalry)	ABC	W 62–21	71,004
January 8, 2009	7:00 p.m.	vs. No. 1 Florida*	No. 2	Dolphin Stadium; Miami Gardens, FL (BCS Championship Game, College GameDay)	FOX	L 14–24	78,468
*Non-conference game; ^{†}Homecoming; Rankings from AP Poll released prior to the game; All times are in Central time

== Roster ==
(as of 30 July 2007)
Wide receivers: 1 Manuel Johnson – Senior; 4 Jameel Owens – Freshman; 8 Brandon Caleb – Junior; 9 Juaquin Iglesias – Senior; 10 Tyler Stradford – Freshman; 11 Corey Wilson – Freshman; 20 Zac Givens – Sophomore; 24 Dejuan Miller – Freshman; 27 Steven Cobb – Freshman; 39 Rashad Hutchins – Freshman; 80 Adron Tennell – Junior; 81 Carter Whitson – Junior; 84 Quentin Chaney – Senior; 85 Ryan Broyles – Freshman; 87 T.J. Hamilton – Junior; Offensive line: 50 Jon Cooper – Senior; 51 Brian Lepak – Sophomore; 54 Jason Hannan- Freshman; 58 Nick Taylor- Freshman; 59 Donald Stephenson – Freshman; 61 Ben Habern – Freshman; 64 Kody Cooke- Freshman; 70 Cory Brandon – Sophomore; 71 Trent Williams – Junior; 72 Duke Robinson – Senior; 73 Brandon Walker – Senior; 74 Brian Simmons – Junior; 75 Jarvis Jones – Sophomore; 76 Branndon Braxton – Senior; 77 Stephen Good – Freshman; 78 Alex Williams – Freshman; 79 Phil Loadholt – Senior; Tight ends: 18 Jermaine Gresham – Junior; 41 Josh New – Sophomore; 47 Trent Ratterree – Freshman; 49 James Toms – Freshman; 82 James Hanna – Freshman; 83 Brody Eldridge – Junior; 88 Eric Mensik – Sophomore; 89 Kolby Smith – Senior; Fullbacks: 34 Matt Clapp – Junior; 40 Buck Buchanan – Freshman; 42 Jacob Ellison – Sophomore	Quarterbacks: 5 John Nimmo – Sophomore; 6 Ben Sherrard – Freshman; 12 Landry Jones – Freshman; 14 Sam Bradford – Sophomore; 15 Joey Halzle – Senior; Running backs: 7 DeMarco Murray – Sophomore; 17 Mossis Madu – Sophomore; 23 Jermie Calhoun – Freshman; 25 Justin Johnson – Freshman; 29 Chris Brown – Junior; 35 Derek Gove – Senior; Defensive line: 33 Auston English – Junior; 44 Jeremy Beal – Sophomore; 53 Casey Walker – Freshman; 62 Tola Jimoh – Junior; 84 Frank Alexander – Freshman; 86 Adrian Taylor – Sophomore; 89 Cordero Moore – Junior; 90 David King – Freshman; 91 R. J. Washington – Freshman; 92 Stacy McGee – Freshman; 93 Gerald McCoy – Sophomore; 94 Pryce Macon – Sophomore; 95 Alan Davis – Senior; 96 DeMarcus Granger – Junior; 97 Cory Bennett – Senior; 99 Jonte Bumpus – Freshman	Linebackers: 8 Ryan Reynolds – Junior; 10 Mike Balogun – Junior; 12 Austin Box – Freshman; 21 J.R. Bryant – Junior; 22 Keenan Clayton – Sophomore; 28 Travis Lewis – Freshman; 30 Lamont Robinson – Junior; 31 Daniel Franklin – Freshman; 45 Turner Troup – Freshman; 48 Brandon Crow – Sophomore; 49 John Marr – Freshman; 57 Dylan Hughey – Freshman; Defensive backs: 2 Brian Jackson – Junior; 3 Jonathan Nelson – Sophomore; 5 Nic Harris – Senior; 6 Desmond Jackson – Freshman; 11 Lendy Holmes – Senior; 13 Michael Hayes – Sophomore; 14 Sean Edwards – Freshman; 15 Dominique Franks – Sophomore; 16 David Sims – Junior; 18 Cortney Carter – Senior; 19 Lamar Harris – Freshman; 20 Quinton Carter – Sophomore; 25 Emmanuel Jones – Junior; 26 Brett Bowers – Junior; 27 Sam Proctor – Freshman; 32 Jamell Fleming – Freshman; 36 Zach Brown – Sophomore; 39 Eli Ferguson – Sophomore; 41 Joseph Ibiloye – Freshman; 42 Colby Gibson – Junior; 43 Marloe Prince – Junior; Punters: 13 Mike Knall – Senior; 43 Adam Schneberger – Freshman; Kickers: 17 Jimmy Stevens – Freshman; 36 Tress Way – Freshman; 37 Matthew Moreland – Freshman; Deep Snapper: 46 James Winchester – Freshman; 52 Derek Shaw – Junior; 55 Kyle Johnson – Senior; 63 Ben Hampton – Junior

== Coaching staff ==
Prior to the season, several changes were made to the Oklahoma coaching staff.

Co-offensive coordinator Kevin Sumlin took the head coaching position at the University of Houston.

Defensive coordinator Brent Venables was mentioned as a candidate for the opening at the University of Arkansas before it ultimately went to Bobby Petrino.

Offensive Coordinator Kevin Wilson interviewed and was considered a finalist for the opening at the University of Southern Mississippi. That opening ended up going to Wilson's counterpart at Oklahoma State University, Larry Fedora.

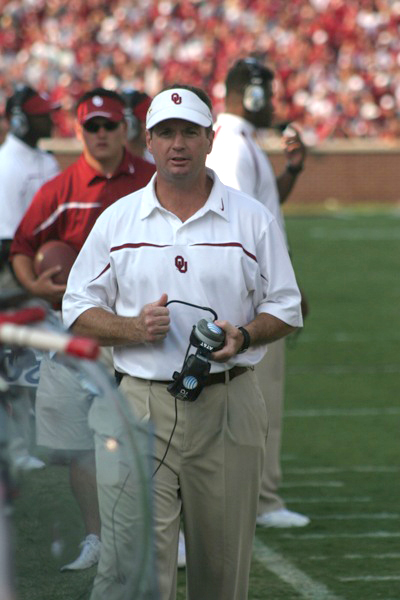
Bob Stoops, head coach of Oklahoma.

Name	Position	Years at OU
Bob Stoops	Head coach	10
Brent Venables	Associate head coach Defensive coordinator Linebackers	10
Bobby Jack Wright	Assistant head coach Co-defensive coordinator Defensive backs	10
Kevin Wilson	Offensive coordinator Tight ends/fullbacks	7
Jay Norvell	Asst. Offensive Coord. Wide receivers	1
Cale Gundy	Recruiting coordinator Running backs	10
Josh Heupel	Quarterbacks	5
James Patton	Offensive line	3
Jackie Shipp	Defensive line	10
Chris Wilson	Defensive ends	4

== Game summaries ==
=== Chattanooga ===
Chattanooga Mocs at No. 4 Oklahoma Sooners

Team	1	2	3	4	Total
Chattanooga	0	0	2	0	2
• #4 Oklahoma	27	23	7	0	57

- Date: August 30
- Location: Gaylord Family Oklahoma Memorial Stadium, Norman, Oklahoma
- Game start: 6:10 p.m. CST
- Elapsed time: 4:09
- Game attendance: 84,715
- Game weather: 91 °F (33 °C) • Wind: SE 12 mph • Weather: Partly Cloudy
- Referee: Rick Loumiet
- TV announcers (FSN PPV): Tim Brando (Play-by-play), Spencer Tillman (Color), & Emily Jones (Sideline)

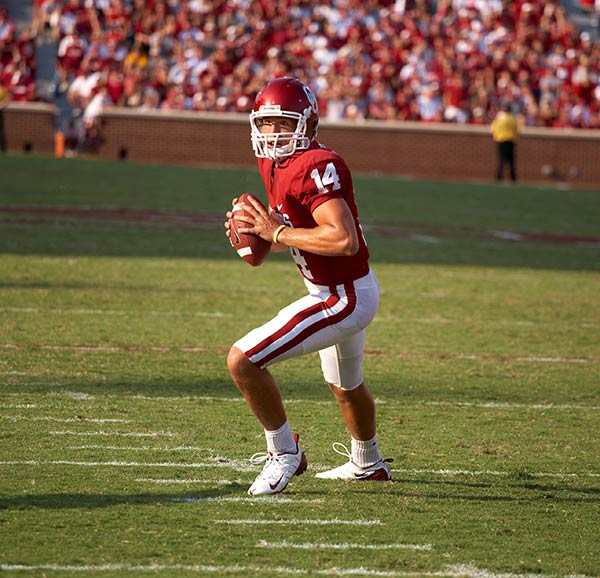
Quarterback Sam Bradford returned for his sophomore year.

Oklahoma came into the season ranked No. 4 in both the Coaches' and AP Poll. In the first game between Chattanooga and Oklahoma, Sam Bradford threw for 183 yards and two touchdowns, and RB Chris Brown ran for three scores. Only an hour-long rainstorm could slow down the Sooners in a 57–2 victory against Chattanooga. The Sooners converted their first seven possessions into touchdowns and led 50–0 before a thunderstorm caused a lightning delay that extended halftime by 1 hour and 12 minutes. UTC, which would go on to earn only one win in the entire season, scored only 2 points on a safety from an errant snap on a punt play. Chattanooga was held to just two first downs the entire game.

=== Cincinnati ===
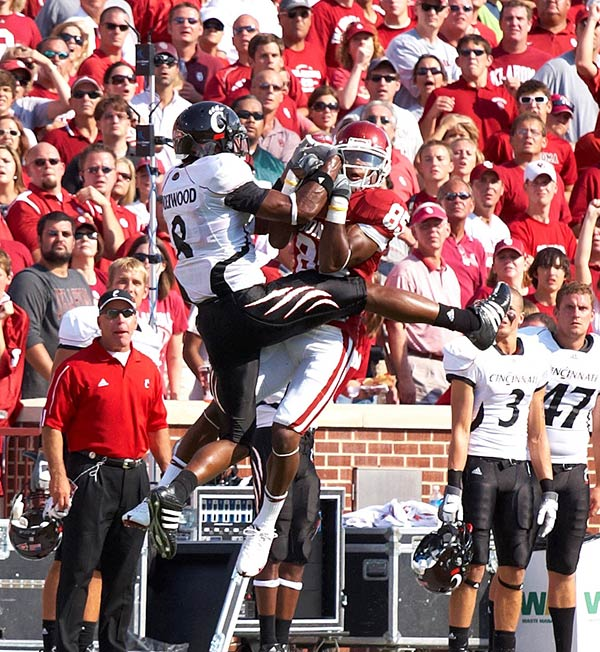
OU's Ryan Broyles and Cincinnati's Brandon Underwood both go up to catch a pass from QB Sam Bradford.

Cincinnati Bearcats at No. 4 Oklahoma Sooners

Team	1	2	3	4	Total
Cincinnati	0	13	7	6	26
• #4 Oklahoma	14	7	21	10	52

- Date: September 6
- Location: Gaylord Family Oklahoma Memorial Stadium, Norman, Oklahoma
- Game start: 2:35 p.m. CST
- Elapsed time: 3:33
- Game attendance: 84,476
- Game weather: 86 °F (30 °C) • Wind: S 15 mph • Weather: Sunny
- Referee: Dennis Hennigan
- TV announcers (ABC): Ron Franklin (Play-by-play), Ed Cunningham (Color), & Todd Harris (Sideline)

Redshirt freshman wide receiver Ryan Broyles, playing his first game as a Sooner, had the most productive receiver debut in school history, with seven catches for 141 yards and a touchdown. Oklahoma gave up a kick return for a touchdown in the third quarter that brought the Bearcats within eight, but OU eventually pulled away from Cincinnati, winning 52–26.

=== Washington ===
#3 Oklahoma Sooners at Washington Huskies

Team	1	2	3	4	Total
• #3 Oklahoma	13	21	14	7	55
Washington	0	0	7	7	14

- Date: September 13
- Location: Husky Stadium, Seattle
- Game start: 4:45 p.m. PST
- Elapsed time: 3:15
- Game attendance: 67,716
- Game weather: 74 °F (23 °C) • Wind: Light & Variable • Weather: Clear
- Referee: Brian O'Cain
- TV announcers (ESPN): Mike Patrick (Play-by-play), Todd Blackledge (Color), & Holly Rowe (Sideline)

On Oklahoma's first drive, QB Sam Bradford threw a 13-yard touchdown pass to Juaquin Iglesias. Oklahoma dominated from then on. Washington scored only twice in the game, losing 55–14. Bradford went 18 of 21 while throwing for 304 yards, five touchdowns and no interceptions. Oklahoma never turned the ball over while Washington fumbled it three times, Oklahoma recovering all three times.

=== TCU ===
#24 TCU Horned Frogs at No. 2 Oklahoma Sooners

Team	1	2	3	4	Total
#24 TCU	3	0	0	7	10
• #2 Oklahoma	21	7	7	0	35

- Date: September 27
- Location: Gaylord Family Oklahoma Memorial Stadium, Norman, Oklahoma
- Game start: 6:11 p.m. CST
- Elapsed time: 3:16
- Game attendance: 85,158
- Game weather: 86 °F (30 °C) • Wind: ESE 7 mph • Weather: Clear
- Referee: Scott Novak
- TV announcers (FSN): Joel Meyers (Play-by-play), Dave Lapham (Color), Gary Reasons (Color), & Jim Knox (Sideline)

TCU had beaten Oklahoma the last two times they had met, the most recent being in 2005, where a #7 ranked Oklahoma was upset by an unranked TCU in the season opener, 10–17.

The game started with Sam Bradford throwing two touchdown passes in the first quarter, one to Juaquin Iglesias and the other Manuel Johnson. Johnson ended the game with three touchdowns (all of which were 50+ yard receptions) and 206 receiving yards on just five receptions, becoming the first Oklahoma player to have 200+ receiving yards in a game. This incredible 41.2 yards per catch is still the Sooner YPC game record for players with at least four catches.

=== Baylor ===
#1 Oklahoma Sooners at Baylor Bears

Team	1	2	3	4	Total
• #1 Oklahoma	28	7	7	7	49
Baylor	0	14	3	0	17

- Date: October 4
- Location: Floyd Casey Stadium, Waco, Texas
- Game start: 11:40 a.m. CST
- Elapsed time: 3:12
- Game attendance: 37,145
- Game weather: 78 °F (26 °C) • Wind: SSW 14 mph • Weather: Sunny
- Referee: Rick Lourniet
- TV announcers (FSN): Bill Land (Play-by-play), Gary Reasons (Color), & Jim Knox (Sideline)

After three rushing touchdowns by Oklahoma and one through the air put them up 28–0 at the end of the first quarter, Baylor never came within 21. Sooners win, 49–17.

=== Texas (Red River Rivalry) ===
#5 Texas Longhorns vs. #1 Oklahoma Sooners

Team	1	2	3	4	Total
• #5 Texas	3	17	10	15	45
#1 Oklahoma	7	14	7	7	35

- Date: October 11
- Location: Cotton Bowl, Dallas
- Game start: 11:10 a.m. CST
- Elapsed time: 3:26
- Game attendance: 92,182
- Game weather: 75 °F (24 °C) • Wind: SE 13 mph • Weather: Mostly Sunny
- Referee: Karl Richins
- TV announcers (ABC): Brent Musburger (Play-by-play), Kirk Herbstreit (Color), & Lisa Salters (Sideline)

This game marked the 103rd meeting of the Red River Rivalry, which has been called one of the greatest sports rivalries. It's the longest active rivalry for the Longhorns, and the second longest for the Sooners, behind only the Bedlam Series. Since 1929, the game has been held at the Cotton Bowl in Dallas, typically in mid-October with the State Fair of Texas occurring adjacent to the stadium.

In a high-scoring shootout, Texas upset the Sooners, 45–35. Colt McCoy performed brilliantly in the fourth quarter, leading his team to 15 unanswered points. It was the highest scoring event in the history of rivalry, and it had the highest attendance, a record 92,182.

=== Kansas ===
#16 Kansas Jayhawks at No. 4 Oklahoma Sooners

Team	1	2	3	4	Total
#16 Kansas	7	10	7	7	31
• #4 Oklahoma	7	17	14	7	45

- Date: October 18
- Location: Gaylord Family Oklahoma Memorial Stadium, Norman, Oklahoma
- Game start: 2:38 p.m. CST
- Elapsed time: 4:00
- Game attendance: 85,241
- Game weather: 72 °F (22 °C) • Wind: S 5 mph • Weather: Clear
- Referee: Gerald Wright
- TV announcers (ABC): Ron Franklin (Play-by-play), Ed Cunningham (Color), & Jack Arute (Sideline)

Sam Bradford had 468 yards and three TDs passing in an offensive matchup. After a score of 24–17 at halftime, Oklahoma began to pull away in the third quarter, eventually winning 45–31 in Norman.

=== Kansas State ===
#4 Oklahoma Sooners at Kansas State Wildcats

Team	1	2	3	4	Total
• #4 Oklahoma	28	27	0	3	58
Kansas State	14	14	7	0	35

- Date: October 25
- Location: Bill Snyder Family Football Stadium, Manhattan, Kansas
- Game start: 11:40 a.m. CST
- Elapsed time: 3:43
- Game attendance: 47,054
- Game weather: 52 °F (11 °C) • Wind: SW 13 mph • Weather: Sunny
- Referee: Randy Christal
- TV announcers (FSN): Bill Land (Play-by-play), Dave Lapham (Color), & Jim Knox (Sideline)

Oklahoma traveled to Manhattan, Kansas to take on a struggling Kansas State team just coming off a tough road loss to Colorado. The Sooners and Wildcats played a wild first half that saw the two teams combine to score 83 points. The Sooners’ 55 first half points set a school record for most points ever scored before halftime. Oklahoma QB Sam Bradford played what would end up being his worst game of the season, completing only 40 percent of his passes (13–32) for 255 yards. Kansas State QB Josh Freeman had a career-best 478 yards passing, but was sacked twice and had three interceptions against the Sooner defense.

=== Nebraska ===
Nebraska Cornhuskers at No. 4 Oklahoma Sooners

Team	1	2	3	4	Total
Nebraska	0	14	7	7	28
• #4 Oklahoma	35	14	13	0	62

- Date: November 1
- Location: Gaylord Family Oklahoma Memorial Stadium, Norman, Oklahoma
- Game start: 7:01 p.m. CST
- Elapsed time: 3:20
- Game attendance: 85,212
- Game weather: 73 °F (23 °C) • Wind: Calm • Weather: Clear
- Referee: Tom Walker
- TV announcers (ESPN): Mike Patrick (Play-by-play), Todd Blackledge (Color), & Holly Rowe (Sideline)

When Nebraska walked out under the lights at Memorial Stadium, the Cornhuskers were still in the race for the Big 12 North title, but after the Oklahoma Sooners completed their first drive for a touchdown, intercepted Husker quarterback Joe Ganz's first pass and took it back for an 18-yard touchdown return, then tacked on three more scores, Nebraska's expectations for its bowl season had been lowered considerably. The second quarter went better for the Cornhuskers, backup tailback Roy Helu getting a touchdown and racking up 157 yards on the day, but the Sooner lead proved insurmountable. The Sooners' Sam Bradford stayed in Heisman-race form, throwing for 311 yards and five touchdowns. DeMarco Murray caught a 25-yard scoring pass from Bradford, and ran twice for touchdowns, finishing with 57 rushing yards. Despite the impressive win, the Sooners slipped from 4th to 6th in the BCS rankings.

=== Texas A&M ===
#6 Oklahoma Sooners at Texas A&M Aggies

Team	1	2	3	4	Total
• #6 Oklahoma	21	17	28	0	66
Texas A&M	0	14	7	7	28

- Date: November 8
- Location: Kyle Field, College Station, Texas
- Game start: 2:37 p.m. CST
- Elapsed time: 3:43
- Game attendance: 85,603
- Game weather: 79 °F (26 °C) • Wind: SE 10 mph • Weather: Clear
- Referee: Tom Walker
- TV announcers (ABC): Ron Franklin (Play-by-play), Ed Cunningham (Color), & Jack Arute (Sideline)

The Sooners scored three touchdowns in the first ten minutes, then never looked back as Sam Bradford passed for four scores to four different receivers and punched one across himself. Chris Brown added three more touchdowns. Aside from the impressive 261 kickoff return yards amassed by Texas A&M running back Cyrus Gray, including a 98-yard return for a touchdown, the hometown Aggie fans had little to cheer about as the Sooners outrushed the Aggies 328–26, and outpassed them 325–252. The Sooner defense frustrated A&M quarterback Jerrod Johnson, sacking him four times and intercepting two of his passes. The win set up a Big 12 showdown against undefeated Texas Tech on November 22, after a bye week.

=== Texas Tech ===
#2 Texas Tech Red Raiders (10–0) at No. 5 Oklahoma Sooners (9–1)

Quarter	1	2	3	4	Total
Texas Tech	0	7	7	7	21
Oklahoma	7	35	16	7	65

at Gaylord Family Oklahoma Memorial Stadium, Norman, Oklahoma

- Date: November 22, 2008
- Game time: 8:00 p.m. EST
- Game weather: Partly cloudy, 48 °F (9 °C)
- Game attendance: 85,646
- Referee: Karl Richins
- TV announcers (ABC): Brent Musburger (Play-by-play), Kirk Herbstreit (Color), and Lisa Salters (Sideline)
- Box Score

Game information

First quarter

- OU – DeMarco Murray 1-yard run (Jimmy Stevens kick), 8:59. Oklahoma 7–0. Drive: 10 plays, 73 yards, 3:35.

Second quarter

- OU – Chris Brown 3-yard run (Jimmy Stevens kick), 14:29. Oklahoma 14–0. Drive: 6 plays, 76 yards, 1:44.
- OU – Jermaine Gresham 19-yard pass from Sam Bradford (Jimmy Stevens kick), 10:58. Oklahoma 21–0. Drive: 5 plays, 84 yards, 1:17.
- OU – Juaquin Iglesias 28-yard pass from Sam Bradford (Jimmy Stevens kick), 7:45. Oklahoma 28–0. Drive: 5 plays, 55 yards, 1:46.
- TT – Tramain Swindall 25-yard pass from Graham Harrell (Matt Williams kick), 6:28. Oklahoma 28–7. Drive: 4 plays, 57 yards, 1:15.
- OU – Chris Brown 4-yard run (Jimmy Stevens kick), 1:04. Oklahoma 35–7. Drive: 12 plays, 80 yards, 5:24.
- OU – DeMarco Murray 1-yard run (Jimmy Stevens kick), 0:18. Oklahoma 42–7. Drive: 1 play, 1 yard, 0:03.

Third quarter

- OU – Jimmy Stevens 33-yard field goal, 11:11. Oklahoma 45–7. Drive: 8 plays, 19 yards, 3:46.
- OU – Chris Brown 2-yard run (Jimmy Stevens kick), 9:07. Oklahoma 52–7. Drive: 2 plays, 3 yards, 0:33.
- TT – Eric Morris 11-yard pass from Graham Harrell, 5:39. Oklahoma 52–14. Drive: 9 plays, 60 yards, 3:28.
- OU – Manuel Johnson 66-yard pass from Sam Bradford (kick blocked), 1:38. Oklahoma 58–14. Drive: 4 plays, 90 yards, 1:40.

Fourth quarter

- OU – Ryan Broyles 26-yard pass from Sam Bradford (Jimmy Stevens kick), 13:54. Oklahoma 65–14. Drive: 4 plays, 38 yards, 1:00.
- TT – Detron Lewis 27-yard pass from Graham Harrell (Matt Williams kick), 0:11. Oklahoma 65–21. Drive: 12 plays, 99 yards, 4:37.

Top passers

- TT – Graham Harrell – 33/55, 361 yards, 3 TD, INT
- OU – Sam Bradford – 14/19, 304 yards, 4 TD

Top rushers

- TT – Baron Batch – 8 rushes, 47 yards
- OU – DeMarco Murray – 18 rushes, 125 yards, 2 TD

Top receivers

- TT – Detron Lewis – 5 receptions, 71 yards, TD
- OU – Jermaine Gresham – 5 receptions, 95 yards, TD

Texas Tech and Oklahoma first played in 1992. Coming into the game, the Sooners led the series 11–4, though the Red Raiders had won 2 of the last 3, with the last loss coming in Norman in 2006. The only road game Tech had won in the series was during the inaugural season of the Big 12 in 1996. Under head coach Bob Stoops, the Sooners had lost only two games at home. The Sooners were 7-point favorites.

The Red Raiders opened the game with a kickoff return to their 32-yard line. The Sooners forced a punt, and fielded their offense at their 27. The Sooners scored a touchdown with 8:59 left in the first. DeMarco Murray contributed 48 rushing yards in the drive. Tech returned the ensuing kickoff to their 22, and a Sooner personal foul after the return gave the Red Raiders 15 yards. Texas Tech lost 10 of those yards due to a delay of game and a false start. Starting at their 27, the Red Raiders were stopped at the Oklahoma 48, where they punted again. The Sooners got the ball on their 20. On the second play of the drive, Oklahoma was punished again with a 15–yard penalty. After three failed attempts to pass the ball for a first down, the Sooners elected to make their first punt. On the next Tech possession, Graham Harrell was sacked on two consecutive plays, once by Adrian Taylor and the other by Gerald McCoy. Coming into the game, the Red Raiders ranked second in the nation in sacks allowed, with only 5. The Sooners ended the first quarter with a 42-yard reception by tight end Jermaine Gresham and two rushes by Chris Brown for a combined 12 yards.

Once the second quarter began, both Brown and Gresham moved the ball for a touchdown on three different plays. Tech started their next drive at their own 38 and advanced the ball through the air to eventually get to the Oklahoma 15. Two incompletions caused the Red Raiders to face a 4th and 3. Tech decided to go for it. Running back Shannon Woods was unable to catch a pass by Harrell to convert and Tech turned the ball over on downs. Murray rushed the ball for 23 yards on Oklahoma's first play of the drive. Murray followed with a 31–yard reception, which put the ball on the Tech 30. After two rushes by Brown, Gresham scored a touchdown on a 19-yard catch, and the subsequent extra point extended the Sooners lead to 21–0. Oklahoma's defense forced Tech to four plays on the next drive, with the fourth play being a 4th-and-4, Tech's second 4th down conversion attempt. With 9:31 remaining, Oklahoma completed a scoring drive of under two minutes, which was capped by Juaquin Iglesias' 28–yard scoring reception. On the following possession, the Red Raiders reached the end zone, thanks to Harrell's 25–yard throw to Tramain Swindall. Matt Williams' extra point brought the score to 28–7. With 6:28 left in the half, Oklahoma began to drain the clock using their running game. The Sooners eventually scored on the 12th play of the drive. With just a minute left on the clock, Tech got the ball back. On the second play, Harrell was intercepted by Travis Lewis, who returned the ball 47 yards. Tech offensive guard Brandon Carter, who stopped Lewis at the Tech 1, received a personal foul. Murray scored on a 1–yard rush to increase the Sooners' lead to 35 points. Tech got the ball again after the Sooner touchdown with 18 seconds remaining in the half. Harrell threw a shovel pass to Baron Batch, who ran 21 yards to the Tech 28. The half ended with Tech receiving a 15–yard personal foul. The Red Raiders left the field facing their biggest deficit of the season (35 points).

Tech attempted an onside kick to start off the second half, though the Sooners grabbed the ball at the Tech 34. OU ended the next drive on a 33–yard field goal. Tech fumbled on their next possession, and Oklahoma's Keenan Clayton recovered the fumble and returned it 53 yards to the Tech 3. The Sooners added another seven points to extend their lead to 45. Tech cranked up its passing game on its next possession, eventually scoring a touchdown and extra point with 5:39 remaining in the third quarter. On the subsequent drive, the Red Raider defense forced their first sack on QB Sam Bradford, and also forced the Sooners to punt. The Sooner defense countered in the next drive by forcing a three-and-out. The Sooner offense then added another score on a 66-yard reception by Manuel Johnson. The Tech defense blocked the extra point, and the score remained at 58–14.

In the fourth quarter, Tech failed to convert another fourth down, giving the ball back to OU. Oklahoma scored immediately afterwards, improving their lead to 51 points. On the next possession, Tech was able to make three pass completions of 10+ yards, though on the final play of the drive, Harrell lost the ball to the Sooners on a sack. With 10:50 left in the game, the Sooners started to run out the clock. The Red Raiders stopped them from scoring on a 4th down from the 1. Tech got the ball back with 4:48 on the clock. After a few plays, Tech faced another 4th down, and this time was able to convert it with a 13–yard throw to Michael Crabtree. Tech later scored their third touchdown with 11 seconds left, and Williams tacked on the extra point to change the score to 65–21. Tech attempted an onside kick and recovered the ball. The final play was a short-yard catch by Woods.

Since the Sooners won, Tech, Texas, and OU all tied for first in the division at 6–1. If all three teams won their regular season finales to tie again at 7–1 (which they did), the highest ranked team in the BCS standings would earn a spot in the Big 12 Championship game. Sports columnists had also predicted that the quarterback of the winning team would be the front runner for the Heisman Trophy. The columnists were right. With Oklahoma being the highest ranked team out of the three of them, they advanced to the Big 12 Championship Game, and their QB, Sam Bradford, became the front runner for the Heisman Trophy, eventually winning it.

=== Oklahoma State (Bedlam Series) ===
#3 Oklahoma Sooners at No. 11 Oklahoma State Cowboys

Team	1	2	3	4	Total
• #3 Oklahoma	7	14	16	24	61
#11 Oklahoma State	3	10	13	15	41

- Date: November 29
- Location: Boone Pickens Stadium, Stillwater, Oklahoma
- Game start: 7:08 p.m. CST
- Elapsed time: 3:33
- Game attendance: 49,031
- Game weather: 46 °F (8 °C) • Wind: Calm • Weather: Cloudy
- Referee: Randy Christal
- TV announcers (ABC): Brent Musburger (Play-by-play), Kirk Herbstreit (Color), & Lisa Salters (Sideline)

Scoring summary
1	12:49	OU	DeMarco Murray 20-yard run (Jimmy Stevens kick)	OU 7–0
1	8:41	OSU	Dan Bailey 28-yard field goal	OU 7–3
2	13:24	OSU	Kendall Hunter 23-yard pass from Zac Robinson (Dan Bailey kick)	OSU 10–7
2	7:24	OU	Chris Brown 2-yard run (Jimmy Stevens kick)	OU 14–10
2	2:57	OSU	Dan Bailey 44-yard field goal	OU 14–13
2	0:13	OU	Jermaine Gresham 3-yard pass from Sam Bradford (Jimmy Stevens kick)	OU 21–13
3	11:12	OSU	Dez Bryant 6-yard pass from Zac Robinson (two-point conversion failed)	OU 21–19
3	11:12	OU	Frank Alexander safety off fumble	OU 23–19
3	10:13	OU	Jermaine Gresham 73-yard pass from Sam Bradford (Jimmy Stevens kick)	OU 30–19
3	6:13	OSU	Zac Robinson 31-yard run (Dan Bailey kick)	OU 30–26
3	1:28	OU	Sam Bradford 2-yard run (Jimmy Stevens kick)	OU 37–26
4	14:13	OSU	Dez Bryant 17-yard pass from Zac Robinson (Zac Robinson pass to Dez Bryant for two-point conversion)	OU 37–34
4	10:46	OU	Brody Eldridge 1-yard pass from Sam Bradford (Jimmy Stevens kick)	OU 44–34
4	10:33	OSU	Perrish Cox 90-yard kickoff return (Dan Bailey kick)	OU 44–41
4	7:17	OU	Juaquin Iglesias 17-yard pass from Sam Bradford (Jimmy Stevens kick)	OU 51–41
4	2:55	OU	Jimmy Stevens 27-yard field goal	OU 54–41
4	0:25	OU	Chris Brown 28-yard run (Jimmy Stevens kick)	OU 61–41

On November 29, 2008, #11 Oklahoma State came into the 103rd Bedlam game ranked the highest they had been coming into the game since the 1984 matchup when they came in at No. 3, while #3 Oklahoma came in ranked the highest they had been coming into the game since the 2004 game just four years earlier, when they were #2. OSU was trying desperately to break their 5-year Bedlam losing streak and keep one of their best seasons in decades going, while OU was trying to make it into the Big 12 Championship Game, and then possibly the BCS National Championship Game.

The first quarter was the lowest scoring of the four; an interception of Oklahoma State junior QB Zac Robinson, a 20-yard TD-rush by Oklahoma sophomore RB DeMarco Murray, then later a 28-yard field goal by OSU sophomore kicker Dan Bailey ended the quarter with OU up 7–3. The second quarter was higher scoring than the first, but still less so than the last two. On a drive that started in the first quarter, the Cowboys scored a TD on a 23-yard pass from QB Robinson to sophomore RB Kendall Hunter. After the kickoff, the Sooners went on a 14 play, 79-yard drive highlighted by a 14-yard run by RB Murray to start off the drive, a 21-yard pass from sophomore quarterback Sam Bradford to Quentin Chaney, and a 2-yard TD-rush by junior RB Chris Brown to end the drive. This TD drive would mark the first in a line of six TD drives in a row by the Sooners. Following the next kickoff, Oklahoma State went on an 11 play, 39-yard drive to set up another Bailey field goal, this one a 44-yarder, to put the score at 14–13, Oklahoma. Oklahoma scored another TD to finish the half up 21–13. Again, the third quarter was higher scoring than the first two, but not as high as the fourth. OSU started the half with an eight play, 81-yard drive with a 6-yard TD pass from QB Robinson to sophomore WR Dez Bryant to finish it. After the TD, the score was 21–19, and the Cowboys decided to go for two. This turned out to be an ill-fated decision, however, because on the two-point conversion attempt, QB Robinson fumbled the ball, and it was recovered and returned all the way to the other endzone by OU freshman DE Frank Alexander for a safety, putting the Sooners up 23–19. Three plays into the next drive, Oklahoma junior TE Jermaine Gresham scored a TD on a 73-yard pass from QB Bradford. After another TD by each team, the third quarter ended at 37–26, OU. The fourth quarter proved to be the most exciting of the game, as more points were scored in this quarter than the entire first half. The quarter began on an Oklahoma State drive that started in the third quarter. QB Robinson completed a 38-yard pass to senior TE Brandon Pettigrew, and two plays later he completed another pass to WR Bryant for a 17-yard TD. OSU decided to try for another two point conversion, and this time it paid off with Robinson again connecting with Bryant to make the score 37–34, Sooners up by three. The momentum the Cowboys got on those eight points would be short lived, however, as Oklahoma RB Murray returned the following kickoff 68 yards to the Oklahoma State 27-yard line. Six plays later, the last being a one-yard pass from Bradford to junior TE Brody Eldridge for the TD, and OU was again up by 10. But, on the ensuing kickoff, OSU junior KR/CB Perrish Cox ran it back 90 yards for the TD to make the score 44–41 and put the Cowboys within three points again. Unfortunately for Oklahoma State, that would be their final score, as the Sooners would score 17 unanswered points to win the game, 61–41.

Oklahoma QB Sam Bradford went 30–44, his second most completions and attempts of his career, but his two TDs tied for his least of the season, and his passer rating of 148.7 was his second worst of the season. Tight end Jermaine Gresham's nine receptions and 158 yards were the most of his career, his two TDs were tied for the second most of his career, and his 71-yard reception was the longest of his career. The combined score of 102 points is the most points ever scored in a Bedlam game. OSU's 41 points were the most they scored in a Bedlam game since the 1998 matchup when they beat Oklahoma, 41–26. This marked the Sooners' 80th win in the Bedlam Series, which was five times as many as Oklahoma State had at the time.

=== Missouri (Big 12 Championship Game) ===
#19 Missouri Tigers vs. #4 Oklahoma Sooners

Team	1	2	3	4	Total
#19 Missouri	0	7	7	7	21
• #4 Oklahoma	10	28	3	21	62

- Date: December 6
- Location: Arrowhead Stadium, Kansas City, Missouri
- Game start: 7:15 p.m. CST
- Elapsed time: 3:29
- Game attendance: 71,004
- Game weather: 32 °F (0 °C) • Wind: NW 10 mph • Weather: Clear
- Referee: Randy Christal
- TV announcers (ABC): Brent Musburger (Play-by-play), Kirk Herbstreit (Color), & Lisa Salters (Sideline)

=== Florida (BCS Championship Game) ===
#1 Florida Gators vs. #2 Oklahoma Sooners

Team	1	2	3	4	Total
• #1 Florida	0	7	7	10	24
#2 Oklahoma	0	7	0	7	14

- Date: January 8
- Location: Dolphin Stadium, Miami Gardens, Florida
- Game start: 8:20 p.m. EST
- Elapsed time: 3:26
- Game attendance: 78,468
- Game weather: 68 °F (20 °C) • Wind: NW 2 mph • Weather: Clear
- Referee: Ron Cherry
- TV announcers (FOX/FOX 3D/ESPN Radio): Thom Brennaman (Play-by-play), Charles Davis (Color), & Chris Myers (Sideline)/Kenny Albert (Play-by-play) & Tim Green (Color)/Brent Musburger (Play-by-play), Kirk Herbstreit (Color), & Lisa Salters (Sideline)

== Rankings ==
Ranking movements Legend: ██ Increase in ranking ██ Decrease in ranking ( ) = First-place votes
	Week																
Poll	Pre	1	2	3	4	5	6	7	8	9	10	11	12	13	14	15	Final
AP	4 (4)	4 (2)	3 (2)	2 (1)	2	1 (43)	1 (51)	4	4	4	6	5	5	3	4	2 (9)	5
Coaches	4 (3)	4 (2)	3 (3)	2 (1)	2 (2)	1 (57)	1 (60)	6	5	4	4	4	5	2 (4)	2 (2)	1 (31)	5
Harris	Not released					1 (102)	1 (106)	4	4	4	5	5	5	3 (2)	4	2 (26)	Not released
BCS	Not released								4	4	6	5	5	3	2	1	Not released

== Statistics ==
=== Team ===
	OU	Opp
Points per game	51.1	24.5
First downs	386	272
Rushing	153	95
Passing	211	154
Penalty	22	23
Rushing Yardage	2,779	1,627
Rushing Attempts	589	469
Avg per Rush	4.7	3.5
Avg. per game	198.5	116.2
Passing yardage	4,891	3,521
Avg. per game	349.4	251.5
Completions–attempts	350-517 (67.7%)	292-527 (55.4%)
Total Offense	7,670	5,148
Total plays	1,106	996
Avg. per play	6.9	5.2
Avg. per game	547.9	367.7
Fumbles-Lost	13-2	35-15

	OU	Opp
Punts–yards	54-1,971 (36.5 avg)	77-3,212 (41.7 avg)
Punt returns-Total Yards	32-272 (8.5 avg)	10-50 (5 avg)
Kick returns-Total Yards	52-1,301 (25 avg)	103-1,456 (23.8 avg)
Onside Kicks	0-0	1-4 (25%)
Avg Time of Possession per Game	29:26	30:34
Penalties–yards	102-905	93-674
Avg. per game	64.6	48.1
3rd down conversions	101/197 (51.3%)	75/206 (36.4%)
4th down conversions	12/23 (52.2%)	15/30 (50%)
Sacks By–yards	42-292	13-95
Total TDs	99	45
Rushing	45	19
Passing	51	22
Fields Goals–attempts	8-13 (61.5%)	9-15 (60%)
PAT–attempts	94-99 (94.9%)	40-41 (97.6%)
Total attendance	510,448	286,549
Games-Avg. per game	6-85,075	5-57,310

=== Scores by quarter ===
	1	2	3	4	Total
Opponents	30	127	91	95	343
Oklahoma	225	238	153	100	716

== 2009 NFL draft ==
The 2009 NFL draft was held on April 25–26, 2009, at Radio City Music Hall in New York City. The following Oklahoma players were either selected or signed as undrafted free agents following the draft.

Player	Position	Round	Overall pick	NFL team
Phil Loadholt	OT	2nd	54	Minnesota Vikings
Juaquin Iglesias	WR	3rd	99	Chicago Bears
Nic Harris	S	5th	147	Buffalo Bills
Duke Robinson	G	5th	163	Carolina Panthers
Manuel Johnson	WR	7th	229	Dallas Cowboys
Lendy Holmes	S	Undrafted		Washington Redskins
Jon Cooper	C	Undrafted		Minnesota Vikings
Quentin Chaney	WR	Undrafted		St. Louis Rams
Branndon Braxton	OT	Undrafted		Cleveland Browns

== See also ==
- 2008 Big 12 Conference South Division 3-way tie controversy
