= Jermaine Gresham =

American football player (born 1988)

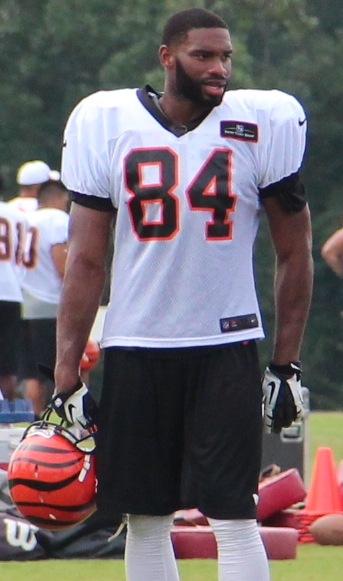
- Gresham with the Cincinnati Bengals in 2013

No. 84
- Position: Tight end

Personal information
- Born: June 16, 1988 (age 38); Ardmore, Oklahoma, U.S.
- Listed height: 6 ft 5 in (1.96 m)
- Listed weight: 260 lb (118 kg)

Career information
- High school: Ardmore
- College: Oklahoma (2006–2009)
- NFL draft: 2010: 1st round, 21st overall pick

Career history
- Cincinnati Bengals (2010–2014); Arizona Cardinals (2015–2018)

Awards and highlights
- 2× Pro Bowl (2011, 2012); Ozzie Newsome Award (2008); First-team All-American (2008); First-team All-Big 12 (2008)

Career NFL statistics
- Receptions: 377
- Receiving yards: 3,752
- Receiving touchdowns: 29
- Stats at Pro Football Reference

Jermaine Gresham (born June 16, 1988) is an American former professional football player who was a tight end in the National Football League (NFL) for nine seasons. He played college football for the Oklahoma Sooners, earning first-team All-American honors in 2008. He was selected by the Cincinnati Bengals in the first round of the 2010 NFL draft.

== Early life ==
=== Football ===
Gresham was a high school standout at wide receiver from Ardmore High School in Ardmore, Oklahoma.

During his sophomore year Gresham helped the Tigers go 10–2, and had the game clinching 29-yard touchdown in a 13–0 win against Ada, a 28-yard game sealing touchdown against Altus to win 21–8, and 168 yards receiving on six catches, including a 74-yard touchdown pass, in a 23–16 loss to Shawnee, He finished the season with 11-touchdowns on 26-receptions, and was named "Best receiver" by the Daily Oklahoman for the 2003 season.

His senior year, he had 70 catches for 1,175 yards and 24 touchdowns and was named to the Parade All-American team. Helped the Tigers go 12–0 before losing in the 5A state semifinals to Bixby. In the quarter-final win over Coweta, he tore the anterior cruciate ligament (ACL) in his left knee.

Gresham had 148 career catches and was ranked as the No. 34 overall prospect in 2005 by rivals.com.

=== Basketball ===
Gresham was also an outstanding basketball player before giving it up after the ACL knee injury, and to pursue his career in football as an Oklahoma Sooner.

Gresham started on the Ardmore basketball team as a 6′4″ freshman center. He averaged 10.1 points-per-game (PPG) and 6.7 rebounds-per-game (RPG). The Tigers made it all the way to the 2003 Class 5A state final against Oklahoma City John Marshall, losing 50–46, to a team led by J. R. Giddens. The John Marshall victory avenged a 68–58 loss to Ardmore in the area championship just a week earlier.

The Ardmore Tigers returned to the Class 5A boys basketball final game for 2004, but lost to the Oklahoma City Southeast Spartans, 60–55, and finished with a 25–3 record. Ardmore led 52–42 with 4:39 to play, but turnovers by Ardmore and three-pointers by Southeast put the Spartans on an 18–3 run to win the title. Gresham (as a sophomore) led the team with an 11.8 PPG season average, added 7.5 RPG, and had 17-points and 15-rebounds in the championship final game. Gresham was named to the Class 5A First-team at center, and "Best bench player", averaging 16.3 PPG for the state tournament. He was named to the All-Southern Conference basketball team for 2003–2004.

As a junior, Gresham helped lead his team to the 2005 Class 5A state tournament semifinals with a 17.3 PPG season average, losing to Tulsa Washington High School 71–61 (a team that included Felix Jones). In the game Gresham stole the ball and dunked it making the score Tulsa Washington–37 Ardmore–34 with 5:25 left in the third quarter, but he was penalized with a technical foul for hanging on the rim. This sparked Tulsa Washington to a 17–6 run to end the quarter at 54–40, and Ardmore never got any closer than nine (with 26 seconds remaining) the rest of the way. He averaged 26.5 points-per-game (PPG) in the state tournament his junior season and was named to the Class 5A Boys All-Tournament First-team, including a career-high 39-points in a quarterfinal 78–74 win over Oklahoma City John Marshall. For the season he shot 62 percent from the field, averaged 10.2 rebounds, had 21 points, 27 rebounds and 11 assists against Tulsa's Nathan Hale in a regional final, was named All-State second-team (all classes), and was named the starting center to the Class 5A All-State team. He was also named the Southern Conference Boys' Player of the Year.

Gresham did not play his final year; at the end of the football season (after tearing his ACL in the next to last game against Coweta, but playing hurt in the final game against Bixby), and start of the basketball season, he underwent surgery December 9, 2005, that ended his senior basketball season.

== College career ==
As the top rated tight end and the number 34 overall prospect by Rivals.com for the 2005 season, Gresham received interest from many top college football programs, including the Oklahoma Sooners, Oklahoma State Cowboys, Miami Hurricanes, LSU Tigers, USC Trojans, Ohio State Buckeyes, and the Nebraska Cornhuskers. National analyst Jeremy Crabtree of Rivals.com called Gresham a "slam-dunk" prospect along with Oklahoma City Southeast defensive lineman Gerald McCoy. He only made three recruiting visits; the first to USC, which he said was "too Hollywood" for him, Miami, and Oklahoma. Gresham was also going to visit LSU on January 20, 2006, but at the last minute Les Miles reportedly withdrew a scholarship offer.

Gresham really liked the tradition of tight ends at Miami (Bubba Franks, Jeremy Shockey and Kellen Winslow Jr.), as well as the camaraderie and closeness of the players there, but in the end it came down to being close to family and friends. His mother, Walletta, would have a hard enough time getting to Norman to see him play. He also loved the way his Oklahoma recruiters, Kevin Sumlin and Jackie Shipp, interacted with their own families. He signed with the Sooners on February 1, 2006, the National Letter of Intent day.

Gresham has been called "the most dynamic tight end at Oklahoma since Keith Jackson."

== Professional career ==
Pre-draft measurables
Height	Weight	Arm length	Hand span	40-yard dash	10-yard split	20-yard split	20-yard shuttle	Three-cone drill	Vertical jump	Broad jump	Bench press
6 ft 5 1/4 in (1.96 m)	261 lb (118 kg)	34 3/4 in (0.88 m)	9 5/8 in (0.24 m)	4.72 s	1.63 s	2.74 s	4.53 s	7.07 s	35.0 in (0.89 m)	9 ft 5 in (2.87 m)	20 reps
All values from the NFL Combine

=== Cincinnati Bengals ===
The Cincinnati Bengals drafted Gresham in the first round with the 21st overall pick in the 2010 NFL Draft. Gresham was still drafted in the first round despite missing all of his last college season with a knee injury. He signed a five-year, $15.85 million deal - with $9.6 million guaranteed - on August 3, 2010.

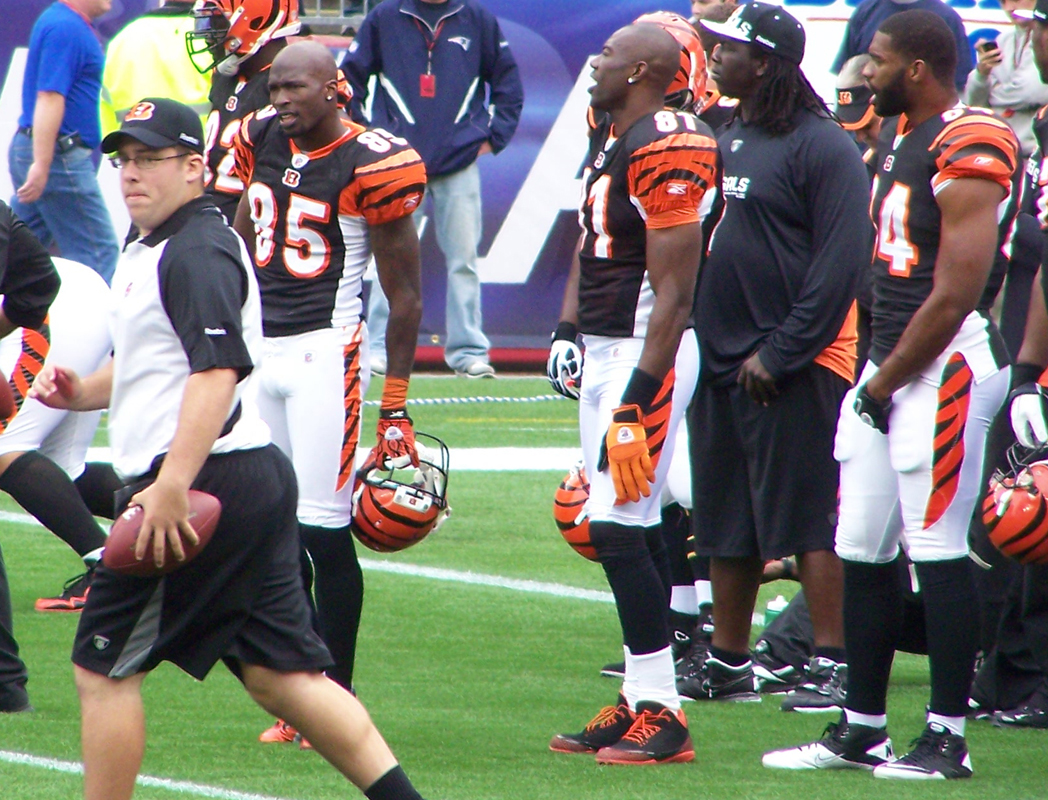
Gresham (far right), next to Terrell Owens (center) and Chad Ochocinco (left), in 2010.

Gresham was the Bengals starting tight end for the first 15 games of his rookie season, and finished with 52 receptions for 471 yards and four touchdowns. His 52 receptions set a franchise record for catches by a rookie tight end, and ranked him third on the team (tied with Jordan Shipley).

Gresham missed two games of his second season with injuries, but still made an improvement in every statistical category, catching 56 passes for 596 yards and six touchdowns. His 56 receptions and six touchdown catches ranked second on the team, while his 596 yards ranked third. The season resulted in Gresham being named to his first Pro Bowl, replacing the Super Bowl-bound Rob Gronkowski and first alternate Aaron Hernandez.

In his third season, Gresham continued to improve, catching 64 passes for 737 yards and 5 touchdowns, ranking him second on the team in each category.

Gresham was named to his second consecutive Pro Bowl and joins Mike Ditka and fellow Sooner Keith Jackson as the only tight ends in NFL history to have over 50 receptions in the first three years of their career.

Gresham's production was reduced in 2013 as he found himself sharing the starting spot with rookie tight end Tyler Eifert, but he still had a solid year, catching 46 passes for 461 yards and 4 touchdowns in 15 games.

=== Arizona Cardinals ===
On July 24, 2015, Gresham agreed on a one-year deal with the Arizona Cardinals, reuniting with former Bengals quarterback Carson Palmer. In a limited role in his first season with the Cardinals, Gresham recorded 18 receptions for 223 yards and one touchdown.

On March 13, 2016, Gresham turned down four-year offers from both the New York Jets and Chicago Bears to stay with the Cardinals on a one-year deal.

On March 7, 2017, Gresham signed a four-year contract extension with the Cardinals.

In 2018, Gresham played in 13 games with 11 starts, recording a career-low nine receptions for 94 yards and no touchdowns.

On March 11, 2019, Gresham was released by the Cardinals.

== Career statistics ==
Legend
**Bold**	Career high

=== NFL ===
Year	Team	Games		Receiving				
Year	Team	GP	GS	Rec	Yds	Avg	Lng	TD
2010	CIN	15	10	52	471	9.1	27	4
2011	CIN	14	13	56	596	10.6	31	**6**
2012	CIN	16	15	**64**	**737**	11.5	**55**	5
2013	CIN	14	14	46	458	9.9	30	4
2014	CIN	15	15	62	460	7.4	23	5
2015	ARI	15	12	18	223	**12.4**	22	1
2016	ARI	16	14	37	391	10.6	34	2
2017	ARI	14	14	33	322	9.8	21	2
2018	ARI	13	11	9	94	10.4	26	0
Career		132	118	377	3,752	10.0	55	29

=== College ===
Season	Team	Games		Receiving			
Season	Team	GP	GS	Rec	Yds	Avg	TD
2006	Oklahoma	13	0	8	161	**20.1**	1
2007	Oklahoma	14	14	37	518	14.0	11
2008	Oklahoma	14	14	**66**	**950**	14.4	**14**
2009	Oklahoma	Did not play due to injury					
Career		41	28	111	1,629	14.7	26

== Random acts of kindness ==
Gresham has appeared in the news and in social media several times for his random acts of kindness. For example, in May 2018, he paid $50 to assist Delilah Cassidy, a law student at Arizona State University, with a baggage fee, so that she did not miss her flight.
