= Ardmore High School =

Ardmore High School can refer to:

- Ardmore High School, Ardmore City Schools in Ardmore, Oklahoma
- Ardmore High School, Limestone County Schools in Ardmore, Alabama
- The provisional name of Charles Herbert Flowers High School, adjacent to Ardmore census-designated place in Prince George's County, Maryland
