= Adrian Taylor =

Adrian Taylor may refer to:

- Adrian Taylor (American football) (born 1988), American football defensive tackle
- Adrian Taylor (producer) (1954–2014), American television news producer

== See also ==
- Adriana Taylor (born 1946), Australian politician
