= Liberty Christian School (Argyle, Texas) =

Location
- 1301 South US Highway 377; Argyle, Texas 76226; United States; 33.084793°N 97.193979°W

Information
- Type: Private school
- Religious affiliation: Christian
- Established: c.1983
- President: Blair McCullough
- Faculty: 250
- Teaching staff: 116.0 (FTE) (2019–20)
- Grades: PreK–12
- Gender: Co-ed
- Enrollment: 1,029 (2019–20)
- Student to teacher ratio: 8.3 (2019–20)
- Colors: Navy and gray
- Team name: Warriors
- Rivals: Prestonwood Christian Academy
- Website: Official Website

Liberty Christian School is a private, college preparatory, Christian school located in Argyle, Texas. Liberty offers Christ-centered education from Preschool (age 3) through Grade 12, and provides state championship programs in academics, fine arts, and athletics.

Liberty Christian is part of the Texas Association of Private and Parochial Schools (TAPPS). Liberty's mascot is the Warrior. In 2021 the school made headlines when it announced the hiring of former Dallas Cowboys tight end Jason Witten as its head football coach. Two years later it would hire another notable athlete, three-time Olympic gold medalist Jeremy Wariner, as its track and field coach.

Established in 1983, Liberty moved to its current location in Argyle in 2005. It was formerly located in Denton, Texas.

== Notable alumni ==
- Carson Blair – former MLB catcher for the Oakland Athletics
- Ben Habern – former college football player for the Oklahoma Sooners
- Luke Kornet – professional basketball player
- Brad Lundblade – Former NFL Offensive Lineman for the Seattle Seahawks
