= Jon Cooper (American football) =

American football player and coach (born 1986)

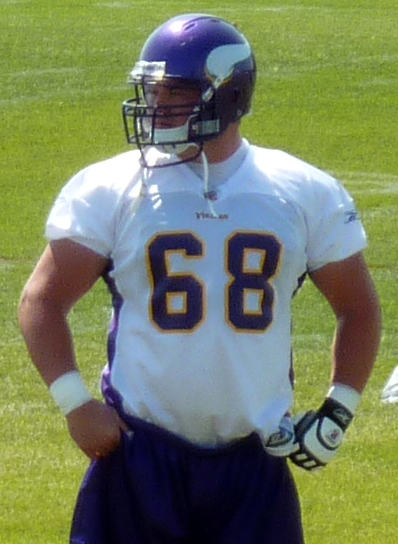
- Cooper during the 2009 Vikings Training Camp.

Mississippi State Bulldogs
- Title: Tight ends coach

Personal information
- Born: October 1, 1986 (age 40); Fort Collins, Colorado, U.S.
- Listed height: 6 ft 3 in (1.91 m)
- Listed weight: 291 lb (132 kg)

Career information
- High school: Fort Collins (CO)
- College: Oklahoma
- NFL draft: 2009: undrafted

Career history

Playing
- Minnesota Vikings (2009–2011); Tennessee Titans (2012)*
- * Offseason or practice squad member only

Coaching
- Oklahoma (2013–2014) Graduate assistant; Utah State (2015) Graduate assistant; Missouri (2016–2017) Offensive analyst; UCF (2018–2019) Tight ends coach; Arkansas (2020) Tight ends coach; Western Carolina (2021) Offensive line coach; Oklahoma (2022) Offensive analyst; North Texas (2023) Offensive line coach; Mississippi State (2024–present) Tight ends coach

Awards and highlights
- Big 12 Offensive Lineman of the Year (2008); 2× All-Big 12 selection (2007, 2008)

Career NFL statistics
- Games played: 13
- Games started: 12
- Stats at Pro Football Reference

Jon Cooper (born October 1, 1986) is an American college football coach and former player. He is the tight ends coach for Mississippi State University, a position he has held since 2024. He played in the National Football League (NFL) for the Minnesota Vikings as a center. He played college football at Oklahoma and was signed by the Vikings in 2009.

== Early life ==
Cooper attended Fort Collins High School in Fort Collins, Colorado, where he was a three-year starter and letterman. He captured team MVP honors his senior season and was named Offensive Player of the Year in the Front Range Conference.

== College career ==
Cooper joined the Oklahoma Sooners football team in 2005. He played in eleven games, starting two, for the team as a freshman. In his second start, he suffered a dislocation and break in his right ankle at Texas Tech and missed the remainder of the season. Was one of the most solid true freshmen on the team after posting no penalties and a high passing grade of 83% in OU's stringent grading process.

Was named the starting center his sophomore season in 2006 and posted the second highest grade on the team, with a 79% success rate. Cooper notched 125 knockdown blocks during the course of the season, including 18 against Oklahoma State.

Cooper led one of the nation's best offensive lines in 2007, starting all 14 games and logging team highs with 798 plays and 136 knockdowns. He had 16 knockdowns against Miami and 15 against Texas A&M, with a final grade of 81% for the season.

== Professional career ==
Pre-draft measurables
Height	Weight	40-yard dash	20-yard shuttle	Three-cone drill	Vertical jump	Broad jump	Bench press
6 ft 3 in (1.91 m)	291 lb (132 kg)	4.98 s	4.56 s	7.46 s	29 1/2 in (0.75 m)	9 ft 2 in (2.79 m)	38 reps
All values from NFL Combine.

=== Minnesota Vikings ===
Cooper signed a rookie contract with the Minnesota Vikings. He appeared in his first NFL game in week 13 against the Arizona Cardinals at right guard after two additional injuries to the offensive line.

=== Tennessee Titans ===
Cooper was signed as a free agent by the Tennessee Titans on April 13, 2012. He retired from the NFL on August 27, 2012.

== Coaching career ==
Following his retirement from the NFL, Cooper joined the coaching staff at Oklahoma as a graduate assistant. In 2016, Cooper joined the staff at Missouri as an offensive analyst. He was named the tight ends coach at Arkansas in 2020.

== Personal ==
Cooper majored in Finance while at Oklahoma. In his free time, he enjoys golfing, and snow skiing. His father Tom played college football for Missouri from 1972 to 1975.
