= Jermie Calhoun =

American football player (born 1988)

Profile
- Position: Running back

Personal information
- Born: October 12, 1988 (age 38); Tyler, Texas, U.S.
- Listed height: 6 ft 0 in (1.83 m)
- Listed weight: 214 lb (97 kg)

Career information
- High school: Van High School, Van, Texas
- College: University of Oklahoma (2008–2010); Angelo State University (2011–2013)

Awards and highlights
- Parade High School All-American (2008); SuperPrep Southwest Offensive Player of the Year (2008)
- Stats at ESPN

Jermie Calhoun (born October 12, 1988) is an American former football running back. He played college football at the University of Oklahoma and Angelo State University. Calhoun was once considered one of the best running back prospects of his high school class.

== Early life ==
A native of Ben Wheeler, Texas, Jermie Calhoun attended Van High School, a 3A school, where he played football and ran track. In football, he started his career playing safety as a freshman. Playing running back during his sophomore year, Calhoun had his breakout performance against Gladewater High School on September 24, 2005. Replacing an injured teammate, he rushed for a school-record 359 yards and four touchdowns in a 35-21 victory.

He rushed for 1,601 yards and 20 touchdowns during his junior year. In one game against Crandall High School he had 220 yards on 10 carries in a half. As a senior, Calhoun carried the ball 242 times, racking up 1,910 yards and 30 touchdowns. Occasionally playing quarterback, he threw 104 passes, completing 57 for 803 yards and four touchdowns. Calhoun was named Texas class 3-A Offensive Player of the Year.

In track & field, Calhoun competed as a sprinter. At the 2008 Region 2-3A Meet, he qualified for the 100-meter dash finals after clocking a PR of 11.21 seconds in the prelims. He also ran the fourth leg on the 4 × 100 m relay squad, helping them earn a second-place finish at 42.86 seconds.

=== Recruiting ===
Considered a five-star recruit by Rivals.com, Calhoun was listed as the No. 2 running back prospect in the nation (behind Darrell Scott).

Calhoun received his first scholarship offer after his break out performance against Gladewater during his sophomore year. The offer was made by the Kansas State University. However, he waited until the end of his junior year for a decision, collecting offers by Florida, LSU, Alabama and Texas A&M, among others. Growing up as a Longhorns fan, Calhoun waited for a Texas offer, but early concerns over his grades scared off the Longhorns recruiters. Calhoun eventually committed to the University of Oklahoma on April 2, 2007.

== College career ==
Calhoun was considered the best high school running back from Texas since Adrian Peterson, although earlier comparisons to Peterson were later relativized. He redshirted during the 2008 season, and was third in depth chart at tailback behind DeMarco Murray and Chris Brown in 2009. He saw limited action in 12 games, rushing 220 yards on 45 attempts. His best game came against Texas A&M, with 18 carries for 94 yards. Calhoun missed much of his sophomore season in 2010 due to a serious knee injury. Calhoun transferred from OU to Angelo State University (DII) in December 2011.
