= Jonathan Nelson (American football) =

American football player (born 1988)

No. 37
- Position: Safety

Personal information
- Born: May 6, 1988 (age 38); Mansfield, Texas, U.S.
- Listed height: 5 ft 11 in (1.80 m)
- Listed weight: 197 lb (89 kg)

Career information
- High school: Mansfield Summit (Arlington, Texas)
- College: Oklahoma
- NFL draft: 2011: 7th round, 229th overall pick

Career history
- St. Louis Rams (2011)*; Carolina Panthers (2011)
- * Offseason or practice squad member only

Career NFL statistics
- Total tackles: 9
- Pass deflections: 1
- Interceptions: 1
- Stats at Pro Football Reference

Jonathan Nelson (born May 6, 1988) is an American former professional football player who was a safety who played for the Carolina Panthers of the National Football League (NFL). He played college football for the Oklahoma Sooners and was selected by the St. Louis Rams in the seventh round of the 2011 NFL draft.

== Early life ==
Nelson attended Summit High School in Arlington, Texas. He was a three-year starter at cornerback. According to his coaches opponents threw away from his side of the field and as a result he ended the season with only one interception. The previous season he made 40 tackles and recovered four fumbles and recorded one interception. Nelson was a sprinter on the track team.

== College career ==
In his first year at the University of Oklahoma, he redshirted the 2006 season. As a redshirt freshman in 2007, Nelson played in just two games due to injury. As a sophomore, he played on special teams, making seven tackles on the season. Nelson began the 2009 season as a nickel back, but started the final three games of the season and recorded 46 tackles and three interceptions. He was chosen honorable mention All-Big 12. After spending his career as a backup, Nelson broke out as a senior, making 102 tackles, breaking up seven passes and intercepting two more. He was rewarded by being selected All-Big 12 Honorable Mention for the second consecutive season.

== Professional career ==
Pre-draft measurables
Height	Weight	Arm length	Hand span	40-yard dash	10-yard split	20-yard split	20-yard shuttle	Three-cone drill	Vertical jump	Broad jump	Bench press
5 ft 10 7/8 in (1.80 m)	198 lb (90 kg)	30 1/2 in (0.77 m)	9 1/4 in (0.23 m)	4.54 s	1.47 s	2.55 s	4.12 s	6.84 s	43.0 in (1.09 m)	11 ft 4 in (3.45 m)	22 reps
All values from Oklahoma Pro Day

=== St. Louis Rams ===
Nelson was selected with the 229th pick in the 2011 NFL draft by the St. Louis Rams. He was waived during final roster cuts on September 3, 2011, but was re-signed to the team's practice squad on September 4. He was released from the practice squad on September 13.

=== Carolina Panthers ===
Nelson was signed to the Panthers' practice squad on November 16, 2011. He was promoted to the active roster by the Carolina Panthers on December 23, 2011. He appeared in the final two games of the regular season, recording nine tackles and one interception in the games combined. In week 16 of the 2011 season against the Tampa Bay Buccaneers, he was named the NFC Defensive Rookie of the Week after recording seven tackles and one interception. Nelson was waived on August 31, 2012.
