= Casey Walker (American football) =

American football player (born 1989)

Eastern Illinois University
- Title: Defenisve line coach

Personal information
- Born: December 6, 1989 (age 36); Dallas, Texas, U.S.
- Listed height: 6 ft 1 in (1.85 m)
- Listed weight: 340 lb (154 kg)

Career information
- Position: Nose tackle (No. 98, 79, 63)
- High school: Garland (Garland, Texas)
- College: Oklahoma
- NFL draft: 2013: undrafted

Career history

Playing
- Carolina Panthers (2013–2014)*; New England Patriots (2014); Baltimore Ravens (2014–2015); New England Patriots (2015)*; Dallas Cowboys (2015); Buffalo Bills (2016)*
- * Offseason or practice squad member only

Coaching
- Garden City (2016) Assistant coach; Central Oklahoma (2017) Graduate assistant, offensive line coach; Oklahoma Baptist (2018) Defensive line coach; Texas A&M–Commerce (2019–2021) Defensive line coach; Louisiana Tech (2022–2023) Defensive line coach; Florida A&M (2024–2026) Defensive line coach; Eastern Illinois University (2026–present) Defensive line coach

Career NFL statistics
- Total tackles: 14
- Sacks: 1.0
- Stats at Pro Football Reference

Casey Walker (born December 6, 1989) is an American former professional football player who was a nose tackle in the National Football League (NFL). He played college football for the Oklahoma Sooners. He was a member of the Carolina Panthers, New England Patriots, Baltimore Ravens, Dallas Cowboys, and Buffalo Bills.

== Early life ==
Walker played high school football for the Garland Owls of Garland High School. He recorded 22 tackles, two sacks, two forced fumbles and seven QB hurries in 2007. He totaled 25 tackles, two sacks, a fumble recovery and two QB hurries in 2006.

== College career ==
Walker played for the Oklahoma Sooners from 2009 to 2012. He was redshirted in 2008.

== Professional career ==
=== Carolina Panthers ===
Walker was signed by the Carolina Panthers on April 30, 2013, after going undrafted in the 2013 NFL draft. He was released by the Panthers on August 31 and signed to the team's practice squad on September 1, 2013. He was released by the Panthers on October 30, 2013. Walker was signed to a future's contract by the Panthers on January 4, 2014. He was released by the Panthers on August 30 and signed to the team's practice squad on September 1, 2014.

=== New England Patriots ===
Walker was signed off the Carolina Panthers' practice squad by the New England Patriots on September 27, 2014. He made his NFL debut on October 5, 2014, against the Cincinnati Bengals.

On November 20, 2014, the Patriots waived Walker to make room for LeGarrette Blount. He was re-signed to their practice squad on November 22, 2014.

=== Baltimore Ravens ===
On December 16, 2014, the Baltimore Ravens signed Walker off the Patriots' practice squad. He was released by the Ravens on August 5, 2015.

=== New England Patriots ===
On August 14, 2015, the New England Patriots signed Walker. He was released by the Patriots on September 4, 2015.

=== Dallas Cowboys ===
Walker was signed to the Dallas Cowboys' practice squad on October 21, 2015. On December 25, he was promoted to the active roster along with quarterback Jameill Showers, after the Cowboys placed tight end Gavin Escobar and quarterback Tony Romo on the injured reserve list. He played in two games and posted two tackles. Walker was released by the team on July 18, 2016.

=== Buffalo Bills ===
On July 30, 2016, Walker was signed by the Buffalo Bills. On September 2, 2016, he was released by the Bills as part of final roster cuts.

== Coaching career ==
Coach Walker began his coaching career in 2017 at the University of Central Oklahoma (UCO) as a graduate assistant working with the Offensive Line. Walker went on to serve as the defensive line coach at Texas A&M University–Commerce from 2019 to 2021. After a short stint at the University of the Incarnate Word in early 2022 working under G.J. Kinne, Walker was hired as the defensive line coach at Louisiana Tech University. In 2024, Walker was hired by Florida A&M University (FAMU), where he is the current defensive line coach Florida A&M University.
