= Cory Brandon =

American gridiron football player (born 1987)

No. 70
- Position: Offensive tackle

Personal information
- Born: October 5, 1987 (age 39); Corsicana, Texas, U.S.
- Listed height: 6 ft 7 in (2.01 m)
- Listed weight: 324 lb (147 kg)

Career information
- High school: Corsicana (TX)
- College: Oklahoma
- NFL draft: 2011: undrafted

Career history
- Tampa Bay Buccaneers (2011)*; Spokane Shock (2012); Chicago Bears (2012–2013); Arizona Cardinals (2014)*; Seattle Seahawks (2014)*; BC Lions (2014); Tampa Bay Storm (2015)*; Calgary Stampeders (2015)*
- * Offseason or practice squad member only

Career AFL statistics
- Total tackles: 1
- Stats at ArenaFan.com
- Stats at Pro Football Reference

Cory Brandon (born October 5, 1987) is an American former professional football offensive tackle. He signed with the Tampa Bay Buccaneers as an undrafted free agent in 2011. He played college football at Oklahoma. Brandon was also member of the Spokane Shock, Chicago Bears, Arizona Cardinals, Seattle Seahawks, BC Lions, Tampa Bay Storm, and Calgary Stampeders.

== Early life ==
He was a first-team all-state after his senior season and also earned all-area and all-district honors after his junior season at Corsicana high school.

== College career ==
He played College football at Oklahoma. He played 13 games and started 7 of them his Junior season.

== Professional career ==
=== Tampa Bay Buccaneers ===
On July 27, 2011, Brandon signed with the Tampa Bay Buccaneers as an undrafted free agent. On September 4, he was released by the Buccaneers.

=== Spokane Shock ===
Brandon played for the Spokane Shock during the 2012 Arena Football League season.

=== Chicago Bears ===
On June 18, 2012, Brandon signed with the Chicago Bears. On August 31, he was released as a part of roster cuts. The following day, Brandon was re-signed to the team's practice squad. On September 10, he was released from the practice squad. On October 17, Brandon was re-signed to the practice squad. On December 17, he was promoted to the active roster after the team placed defensive tackle Matt Toeaina on injured reserve.

=== Arizona Cardinals ===
Brandon signed with the Arizona Cardinals on May 27, 2014.

=== Seattle Seahawks ===
After the Cardinals waived him, the Seattle Seahawks claimed Brandon off waivers on August 4, 2014. The Seahawks released Brandon on August 25.

=== BC Lions ===
Brandon signed with the BC Lions on August 31, 2014.

=== Tampa Bay Storm ===
Brandon was assigned to the Tampa Bay Storm of the Arena Football League on October 2, 2014.

=== Calgary Stampeders ===
Brandon signed with the Calgary Stampeders on March 18, 2015. He was transferred to the retired list on May 12.
