= Mossis Madu =

American football player (born 1987)

No. 32
- Position: Running back

Personal information
- Born: November 4, 1987 (age 39); Bedford, Texas, U.S.
- Listed height: 6 ft 0 in (1.83 m)
- Listed weight: 197 lb (89 kg)

Career information
- High school: Norman (Norman, Oklahoma)
- College: Oklahoma
- NFL draft: 2011: undrafted

Career history
- Tampa Bay Buccaneers (2011); New York Jets (2013)*; Hamilton Tiger-Cats (2014–2015); Ottawa Redblacks (2016–2019)
- * Offseason or practice squad member only

Awards and highlights
- Grey Cup champion (2016)

Career NFL statistics
- Rushing attempts: 15
- Rushing yards: 55
- Receptions: 10
- Receiving yards: 72
- Stats at Pro Football Reference
- Stats at CFL.ca

Mossis Madu Jr. (born November 4, 1987) is an American former professional football player who was a running back in the National Football League (NFL) and Canadian Football League (CFL). He was signed by the Tampa Bay Buccaneers as an undrafted free agent in 2011. Mossis played high school football at Norman High School in Norman, where he was raised. After high school, Mossis went on to play college football for the Oklahoma Sooners.

== Professional career ==
=== New York Jets ===
Madu was signed by the New York Jets on August 4, 2013. He was released on August 31, 2013.

=== Hamilton Tiger-Cats ===
Madu signed with the Hamilton Tiger-Cats of the Canadian Football League in time for the 2014 CFL season. In his first season in the CFL Madu was dressed for 15 games, carrying the ball 75 times for 348 yards with 2 touchdowns. He also contributed 44 receptions for 512 yards in the passing game. Madu missed the entire 2015 season with a shoulder injury.

=== Ottawa RedBlacks ===
Following an injury to starting running back William Powell the Ottawa Redblacks signed Mossis Madu. When Travon Van also went down with injuries Mossis Madu became the new starting running back for the Redblacks. Madu played in 6 regular season games during the season, carrying the ball for 490 yards on 92 carries with 3 touchdowns. Madu suffered an injury during the East Division Final and missed the remainder of the contest. Following the game it was announced he would miss the Grey Cup final with a fractured scapula. In 2017 Madu mostly played as the Redblacks backup running back behind William Powell; playing in only seven games, rushing 71 times for 317 yards with 2 touchdowns. In January 2018 Madu and the Redblacks agreed to a one-year contract extension. Madu was limited by injury to the final two games of the year, where he rushed for 104 yards and a score on 25 carries. Madu was signed to a one-year extension several minutes before free agency was to begin on February 12, 2019. He was released by the Redblacks on January 23, 2020.
