= Eric Mensik =

American football player (born 1987)

No. 69
- Position: Offensive tackle

Personal information
- Born: December 18, 1987 (age 38); Rosenberg, Texas, U.S.
- Listed height: 6 ft 6 in (1.98 m)
- Listed weight: 288 lb (131 kg)

Career information
- College: Oklahoma
- NFL draft: 2011: undrafted

Career history
- Arizona Cardinals (2011)*
- * Offseason or practice squad member only

Awards and highlights
- First-team All-Big 12 (2010)
- Stats at Pro Football Reference

Eric Mensik (born December 18, 1987) is an American former football offensive tackle. He was signed by the Arizona Cardinals as an undrafted free agent in 2011. He played college football at Oklahoma from 2007 to 2010, beginning as a tight end and later moving to the offensive line. He was selected as a first-team All-Big 12 player after the 2010 college football season. Mensik was signed by the Cardinals as an undrafted free agent following the end of the NFL lockout in 2011. He was waived on August 29, 2011.
