= Ardmore City Schools =

School district in Oklahoma

Location
- 611 Veterans Blvd; Ardmore, Oklahoma 73401 Carter County, Oklahoma United States

District information
- Type: Public
- Grades: PK-12
- Superintendent: Andy Davis
- Schools: 6

Students and staff
- Students: 2,617 (2023–2024)
- Teachers: 117.63 (FTE)
- Student–teacher ratio: 22.25

Other information
- Website: www.ardmoreschools.org

Ardmore City Schools is a public school district in the United States serving parts of Ardmore, Oklahoma. The district covers 26.42 square miles of land.

In 2013, the district held a meeting to promote a $31 million school bond proposal. The proposal called for the construction of a new campus for Lincoln Elementary School, additional classrooms for two elementary schools, and a new roof for the middle school.

== Schools ==
As of 2013, some of the school campuses were built in the late 1900s. Sonny Bates, the superintendent, said that year that some school roofs were leaky. In 2010, the district closed Franklin Elementary School.

- Ardmore High School (grades 9-12)
- Ardmore Middle School (7th and 8th grade)
- Jefferson Elementary School (5th and 6th grade)
- Lincoln Elementary School (3rd and 4th grade)
- Charles Evans Elementary School (1st and 2nd grade)
- Will Rodgers Elementary School (Pre-K and Kindergarten)
