= Bobby Jack Wright =

American football player and coach (born 1950)

Biographical details
- Born: December 11, 1950 (age 75); Mission, Texas, U.S.

Playing career
- 1969–1972: Southwest Texas State

Coaching career (HC unless noted)
- 1979–1982: Texas A&I (assistant)
- 1983–1985: North Texas (assistant)
- 1986–1996: Texas (assistant)
- 1997: Texas (DC)
- 1999–2004: Oklahoma (DE)
- 2005–2010: Oklahoma (co-DC)
- 2011–2014: Oklahoma (ST)

Bobby Jack Wright (born December 11, 1950) is an American former football coach. He was the assistant head coach, co-defensive coordinator, and secondary coach under Bob Stoops at the University of Oklahoma. He was originally hired at Oklahoma to recruit in the state of Texas. Prior to arriving at Oklahoma, Wright was an assistant coach at two high schools, head coach at one, and as assistant coach at the University of North Texas. In 1986, he was hired by the University of Texas to serve as an assistant. In 1997, Wright was promoted to defensive coordinator under John Mackovic. Wright has more Big 12 championship rings than any other player or coach in conference history.
