= Ben Habern =

American football player (born 1989)

- Habern Fall 2010 VS FSU

No. 61
- Position: Center

Personal information
- Born: July 28, 1989 (age 37); Denton, Texas, U.S.
- Listed height: 6 ft 3 in (1.91 m)
- Listed weight: 298 lb (135 kg)

Career information
- High school: Argyle (TX) Liberty Christian
- College: University of Oklahoma (2008–11)

Awards and highlights
- U.S. Army All-American (2007); Parade All-American (2007); Big 12 Champions (Team) (2008); All-Big 12 Freshman Team (ESPN) (2009); All-Big 12 Academic Second Team (2009); All-Big 12 honorable mention (AP) (2010); Big 12 Champions (Team) (2010); 2011 BCS Tostitos Fiesta Bowl Champions (Team) (2010)

Benjamin David Habern (born July 28, 1989), is an American former football center for the University of Oklahoma Sooners football team from 2008 to 2011. He played high school football at Argyle Liberty Christian School in Argyle, Texas. Habern currently serves as the Marketing and Strategic Partnerships Assistant Director for the College Football Playoff.

== High school ==
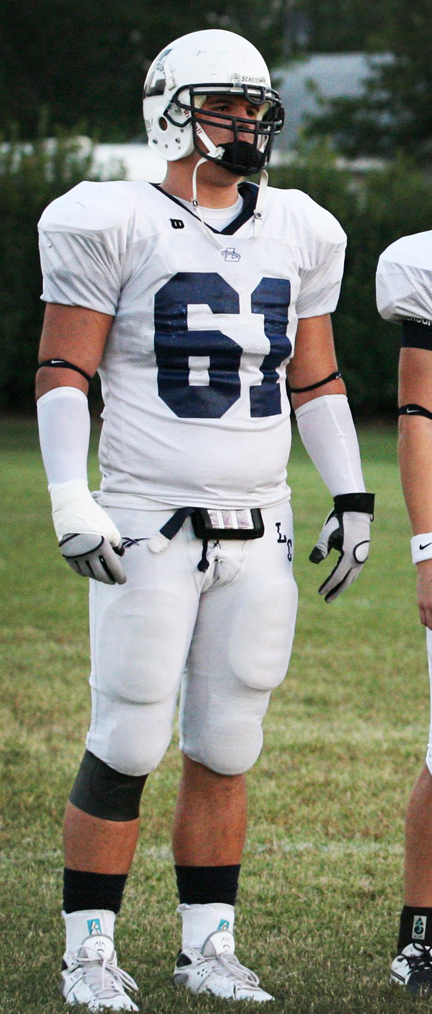
Habern during senior year of HS at Liberty Christian

Was selected as a U.S. Army All-American and a Parade All-American. He also was first team all-state on both offensive and Defensive Lines. During his senior year, recorded 112 pancake blocks while not allowing a sack, and defensively racked up 67 tackles and 11 sacks while helping lead Liberty to a state championship. In 2006 as a Junior He totaled 61 pancake blocks on the offensive side of the ball and recorded 34 tackles and five sacks on defense.

=== Recruitment ===
Habern was heavily recruited starting early in his junior year across the country receiving scholarships from Oklahoma, Arizona, Florida State, Miami (FL), Nebraska, Notre Dame, Oklahoma State, Texas A&M, and Texas Tech). He was regarded as one of the top offensive line prospects in the country. Major recruiting sources listed him as one of the top prospects at his position including, No. 2 center in the nation (ESPN), No. 3 center in the nation (Rivals.com), No. 4 center in the nation (Scout.com), and No. 22 Texas Top 100 (Rivals.com). Ben grew up an Oklahoma Sooners fan and verbally committed to OU on April 4, 2007 ending his recruitment.

== College career ==
2008 (Freshman)

Received a medical redshirt after seeing action in three games (Chattanooga, Washington, Baylor) as the backup at center, suffering a Broken Toe versus Baylor. The Sooners went 12 and 2 and went on to play in the National Championship game against The Florida Gators in Miami, Florida.

2009 (Redshirt Freshman)

Played in the season opener against BYU before starting the next 10 games at center. He suffered a season-ending ankle injury at Texas Tech but was still named All-Big 12 Freshman by ESPN.com as well as All-Big 12 Academic second team. He played 741 snaps with 70 knockdowns. The Sooners finished the season 8–5, 5–3 in Big 12 play and won the Sun Bowl 31–27 against Stanford.

2010 (Redshirt Sophomore)

Starting center for all 14 games for the Sooners. Led the offensive linemen with 1,070 snaps played and 123 knockdowns. Habern also led the team in knockdowns in five games including a season-high 16 vs. Colorado. Helped the Sooners to a 12-2 Record as well as a Big 12 Championship win and a BCS Bowl win in the 2011 Fiesta Bowl. Beating The Connecticut Huskies 48-20. Habern was named All-Big 12 honorable mention by AP.

2011 (Redshirt Junior)

Starting center missed five games with an arm injury suffered against Missouri. Returned to action vs. Texas A&M and to the starting lineup against Iowa State. Habern finished the season with 39 knockdowns on 391 snaps as Oklahoma went on to beat Iowa in the Insight Bowl 31-14.

2012 (retirement)

During the Insight Bowl against Iowa Habern played most of the game with a sore neck. After the game Habern was evaluated and learned he needed surgery to repair an injury to his neck. In January, 2012, he had surgery to fuse together two vertebrae and after rehabbing through the summer Habern decided to retire from playing football because of his health concerns.
