= R. J. Washington =

American football player (born 1989)

No. 92
- Position: Defensive end

Personal information
- Born: March 14, 1989 (age 37); Fort Worth, Texas
- Listed height: 6 ft 3 in (1.91 m)
- Listed weight: 270 lb (122 kg)

Career information
- High school: Keller (TX) Fossil Ridge
- College: Oklahoma
- NFL draft: 2013: undrafted

Career history
- St. Louis Rams (2013)*
- * Offseason or practice squad member only

R. J. Washington (born March 14, 1989) is an American former football player. Washington played college football at Oklahoma.

== Early life ==
Washington prepped at Fossil Ridge High School of Keller, a suburb of Ft. Worth, Texas, where he was coached by Hal Wasson and later Tony Baccarinni. As a sophomore in 2005, he broke the school record for quarterback sacks with 10 in his first year as a varsity starter, earning district 6-4A's sophomore of the year honors.

During his junior year, Washington recorded 87 tackles, including 18 TFLs, and 10 sacks. He received all-district and all-state honors. As senior in 2007, made 84 tackles with 11 sacks and 36 quarterback pressures, finishing his career with school records in sacks per game and per career. Washington was rated the No. 1 defensive end nationally by Rivals.com. He was named the 2008 Southwest Defensive Player of the year by SuperPrep Magazine and was elected to play in the 2008 U.S. Army All-American Bowl.

== College career ==
Washington had numerous offers from highly regarded schools, including Texas, Texas A&M and Nebraska. He eventually committed to the Oklahoma Sooners, because of his grandparents, who live around 20 minutes outside of Norman, Oklahoma.
