= Brandon Caleb =

American football player (born 1987)

No. 80
- Position: Wide receiver

Personal information
- Born: July 30, 1987 (age 39); Richmond, Virginia, U.S.
- Listed height: 6 ft 1 in (1.85 m)
- Listed weight: 187 lb (85 kg)

Career information
- High school: Fork Union (VA) Military Academy
- College: Oklahoma
- NFL draft: 2011: undrafted

Career history
- Philadelphia Eagles (2011)*; Georgia Force (2012)*
- * Offseason or practice squad member only

Brandon Caleb (born July 30, 1987) is an American former football wide receiver. He was signed by the Philadelphia Eagles as an undrafted free agent in 2011. He played college football for the Oklahoma Sooners.

== Early life ==
Caleb was a standout in high school for the Fork Union Military Academy. As a senior in high school he was All-state at linebacker and receiver as well as team captain. Off the football field he was a four-time state triple jump champion and won track state championships in long jump (three times), high hurdles and intermediate hurdles. He was named the 2005 Central Virginia Track Athlete of the Year. ESPN College Football Recruiting 2006 said of Caleb, Is always going to be a player that makes the big catch. He was ranked by Rivals.com as the 12th best high school football prospect in the state of Virginia and the 35th best wide receiver in the country. He committed to the Oklahoma Sooners football team over the Florida Gators and more on August 12, 2005.

== College career ==
In 2006, Caleb saw action in 10 games, mostly on special teams. He recorded two tackles for the season. In 2007, he recorded a tackle on special teams against North Texas and saw time at wide receiver against the Mean Green before a season-ending injury. He received an injury hardship and had his sophomore season restored for 2008. With wide receivers Juaquin Iglesias and Manuel Johnson graduated and in the NFL, Caleb earned a starting spot in his junior year of 2009. He immediately contributed with big numbers including 7 catches for 139 yards in a game against Baylor. Caleb emerged in 2009 leading the Sooners in receptions and receiving yards through the first half of the season.

== Professional career ==
Caleb was signed by the Philadelphia Eagles as an undrafted free agent following the 2011 NFL draft on August 3, 2011, but was waived on August 20.
