= Adrian Taylor (American football) =

American football player

No. 86
- Position: Defensive lineman

Personal information
- Born: June 21, 1988 (age 38)
- Listed height: 6 ft 4 in (1.93 m)
- Listed weight: 302 lb (137 kg)

Career information
- High school: Mansfield (Mansfield, Texas)
- College: Oklahoma (2006–2010)

Career history
- Seattle Seahawks (2012)*
- * Offseason or practice squad member only
- Stats at Pro Football Reference

Adrian Taylor (born June 21, 1988) is an American former football defensive tackle. He played college football for the Oklahoma Sooners.
