= 2010 NFL draft =

2010 American football draft

General information
- Date: April 22–24, 2010
- Time: 7:30 pm EDT (April 22); 6:00 pm EDT (April 23); 10:00 am EDT (April 24)
- Location: Radio City Music Hall in New York, New York
- Networks: ESPN, NFL Network

Overview
- 255 total selections in 7 rounds
- League: NFL
- First selection: Sam Bradford, QB; St. Louis Rams
- Mr. Irrelevant: Tim Toone, WR; Detroit Lions
- Most selections (13): Philadelphia Eagles
- Fewest selections (4): New York Jets

The 2010 NFL draft was the 75th annual meeting of National Football League (NFL) franchises to select newly eligible football players. The 2010 draft took place over three days, at Radio City Music Hall in New York City, with the first round on April 22, 2010. The second and third rounds took place on April 23, while the final four rounds were held on April 24. Television coverage was provided by both NFL Network and ESPN.

The St. Louis Rams, as the team with the worst record during the 2009 season, selected the 2008 Oklahoma Sooners Heisman Trophy-winning quarterback Sam Bradford with the first pick in the draft. Three of the top four picks—Bradford, defensive tackle Gerald McCoy and offensive tackle Trent Williams—were members of the Oklahoma Sooners football team, and five of the top six—Bradford, Nebraska defensive tackle Ndamukong Suh, McCoy, Williams and Oklahoma State offensive tackle Russell Okung—were from the Big 12 Conference. The Detroit Lions made the final pick in the draft, commonly called Mr. Irrelevant, by selecting the FCS first-team All-American wide receiver out of Weber State Tim Toone with the two-hundred and fifty-fifth pick. The prime-time broadcast of the first round was watched by 7.29 million viewers making it the most viewed first round ever and making ESPN the second most watched network of the night.

As of 2026, the only remaining active players from the 2010 draft class are San Francisco 49ers offensive tackle Trent Williams and Tennessee Titans long snapper Morgan Cox.

== Overview ==
Of the 255 players drafted 216 (or 84%) were among the 327 players who participated in the 2010 NFL Scouting Combine. This matches the average percentage of combine participants among draftees over the past 10 years. An additional 39 players who did not attend the combine were selected.

There was wide speculation that the 2010 NFL draft would have a very large number of early entrants because of a possible rookie pay scale to be imposed starting with the 2011 NFL draft. Eligible underclassmen projected as top NFL prospects risked losing millions of contractually-guaranteed dollars if they did not declare for the draft the year before a new CBA could be reached. The early entry deadline was January 15. After the early entry deadline had passed, it was confirmed that the 2010 NFL draft would have fifty-three non-seniors, tying a draft record for the most non-seniors ever.

The draft's first round, in which teams were allowed ten minutes to make each selection, consumed three hours and 28 minutes. The second round (with a maximum of seven minutes per selection) lasted two hours and 25 minutes. After the second round, teams were allotted five minutes per pick. The third round took one hour and 41 minutes. Rounds 4 through 7 each lasted less than two hours. For the second time in draft history, the first two players selected were named Offensive and Defensive Rookies of the Year, respectively.

The following is the breakdown of the 255 players selected by position:

- 33 cornerbacks
- 30 defensive ends
- 29 linebackers
- 27 wide receivers
- 25 defensive tackles
- 23 offensive tackles
- 20 tight ends
- 19 safeties
- 14 quarterbacks
- 13 running backs
- 9 guards
- 6 centers
- 3 punters
- 2 fullbacks
- 2 kick returners

== Changes in draft order ==
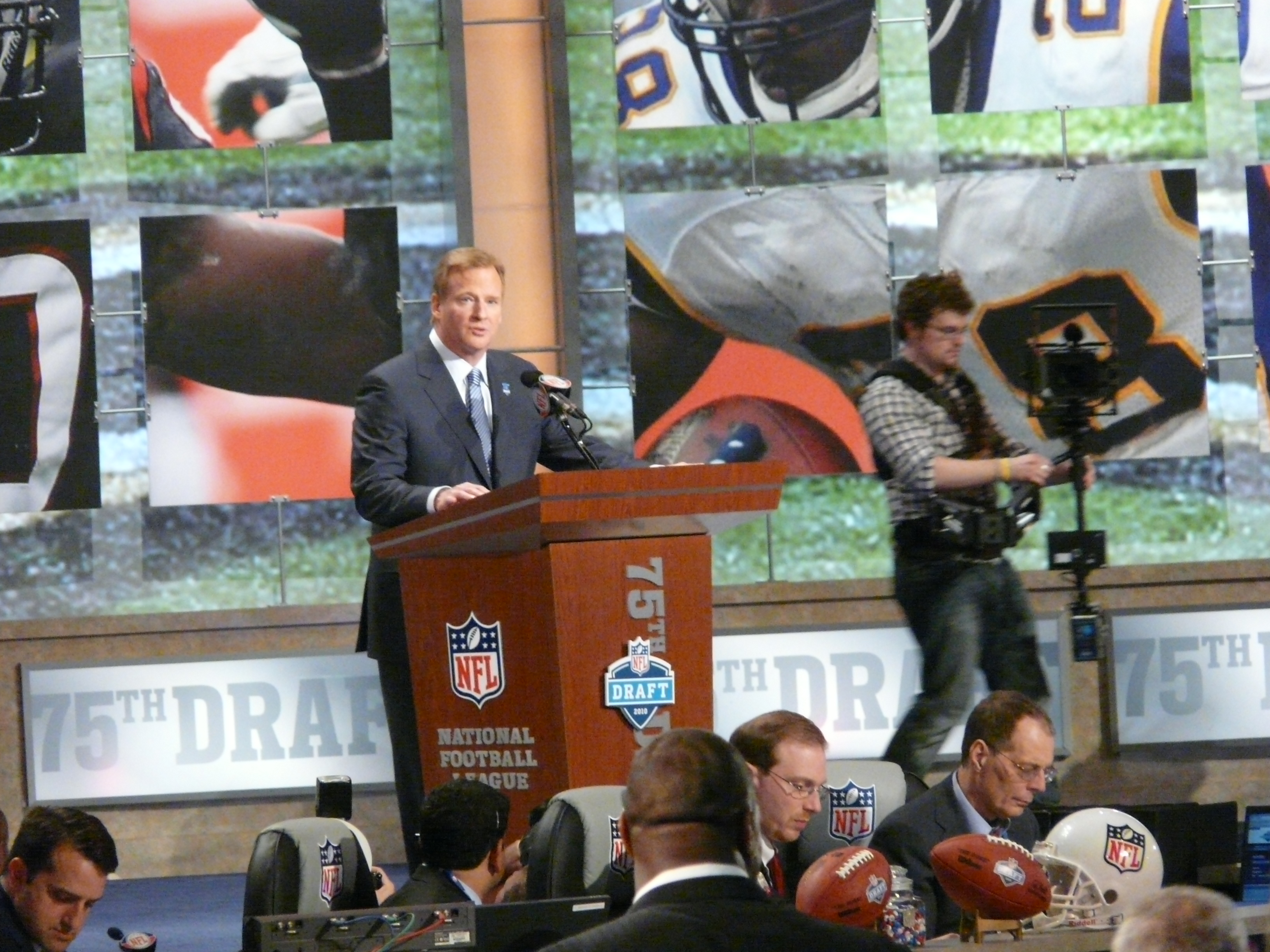
Commissioner Roger Goodell announcing a pick

At the 2009 annual owners meeting, NFL owners unanimously approved changes to the order for assigning draft picks, starting with the 2010 draft.

The new format took into account the seeding of playoff teams. The two major changes from previous years were:

- Teams that make the playoffs pick after teams that do not.
- Teams that advance further in the playoffs pick later. In 2008, the Chargers, who went 8–8 in the regular season, defeated the 12–4 Indianapolis Colts in an AFC wild card game. Nevertheless, the Chargers received the 16th pick while the Colts picked 27th, and the Patriots, who missed the playoffs, picked 23rd according to the rules then in effect, which prioritized regular season record for all teams except those in the Super Bowl.

The new order assigns picks for each round as indicated in the table below. Except the changes noted above, the order will generally follow that used in previous years (i.e. within a given status, teams with worse regular-season records will pick earlier in the first round, and picks will cycle from round to round among teams that are tied).

Three coin tosses were necessary to establish the final selection order: Jacksonville, Tennessee and Atlanta won their flips over Denver, Carolina and Houston, respectively.

Status	Draft picks
Non-playoff teams	1–20
Eliminated in Wild Card round	21–24
Eliminated in Divisional round	25–28
Eliminated in Conference Championships	29–30
Super Bowl losing team	31
Super Bowl champion	32

== Player selections ==
*	compensatory selection
^	supplemental compensatory selection
^{†}	Pro Bowler

Positions key
Offense	Defense	Special teams
QB — Quarterback; RB — Running back; FB — Fullback; WR — Wide receiver; TE — Tight end; OL — Offensive lineman; T — Tackle; G — Guard; C — Center	DL — Defensive lineman; DT — Defensive tackle (Note: Includes nose tackle (NT)); DE — Defensive end; EDGE — Edge rusher; LB — Linebacker (Note: Includes middle linebacker (MLB/MIKE), weakside linebacker (WILL), strongside linebacker (SAM), off-ball linebacker, and outside linebacker (OLB)); DB — Defensive back; CB — Cornerback; S — Safety (Note: Includes free safety (FS) and strong safety (SS))	K — Kicker (Note: Also known as a placekicker (PK)); P — Punter; LS — Long snapper; RS — Return specialist (Note: Includes kickoff and punt returners)

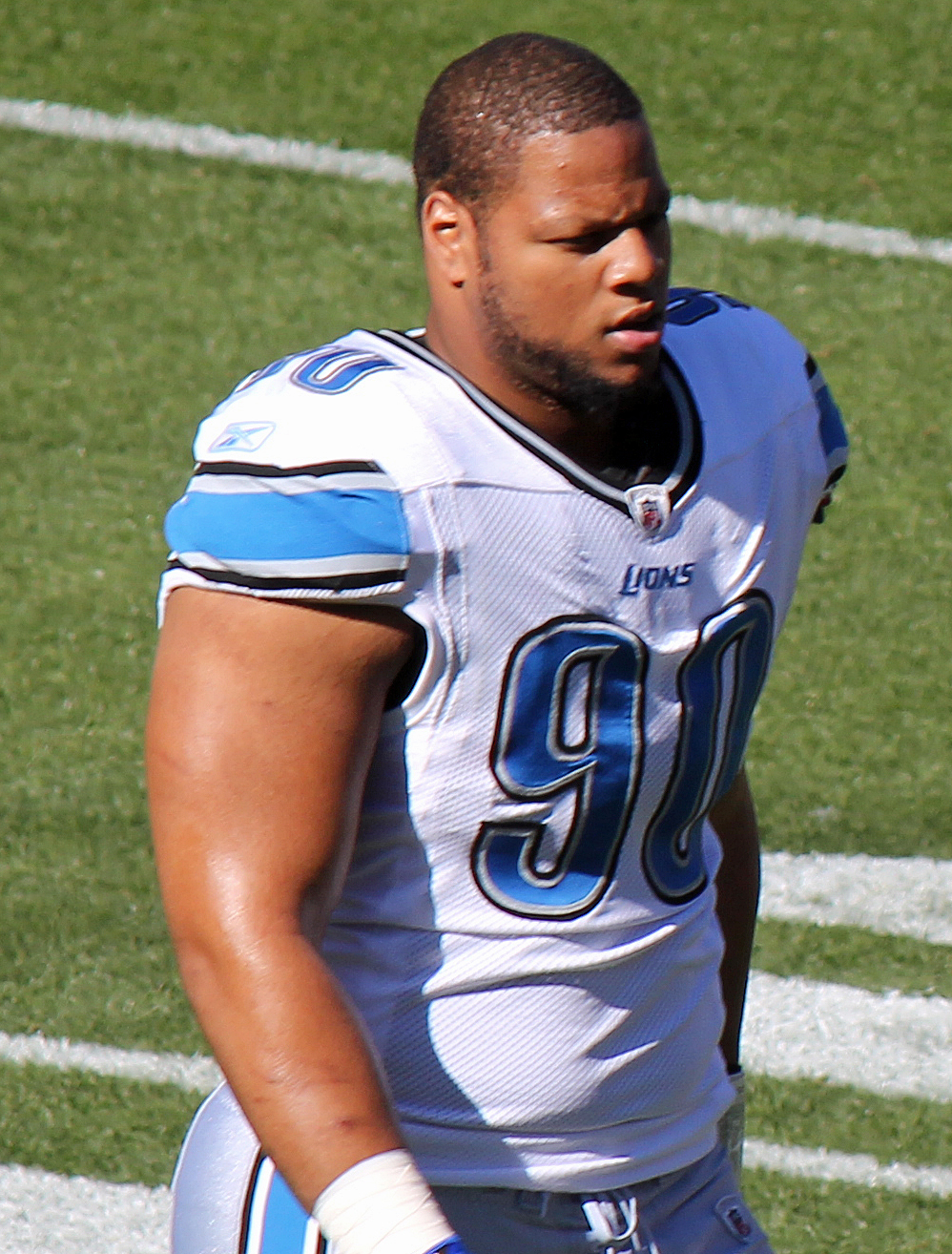
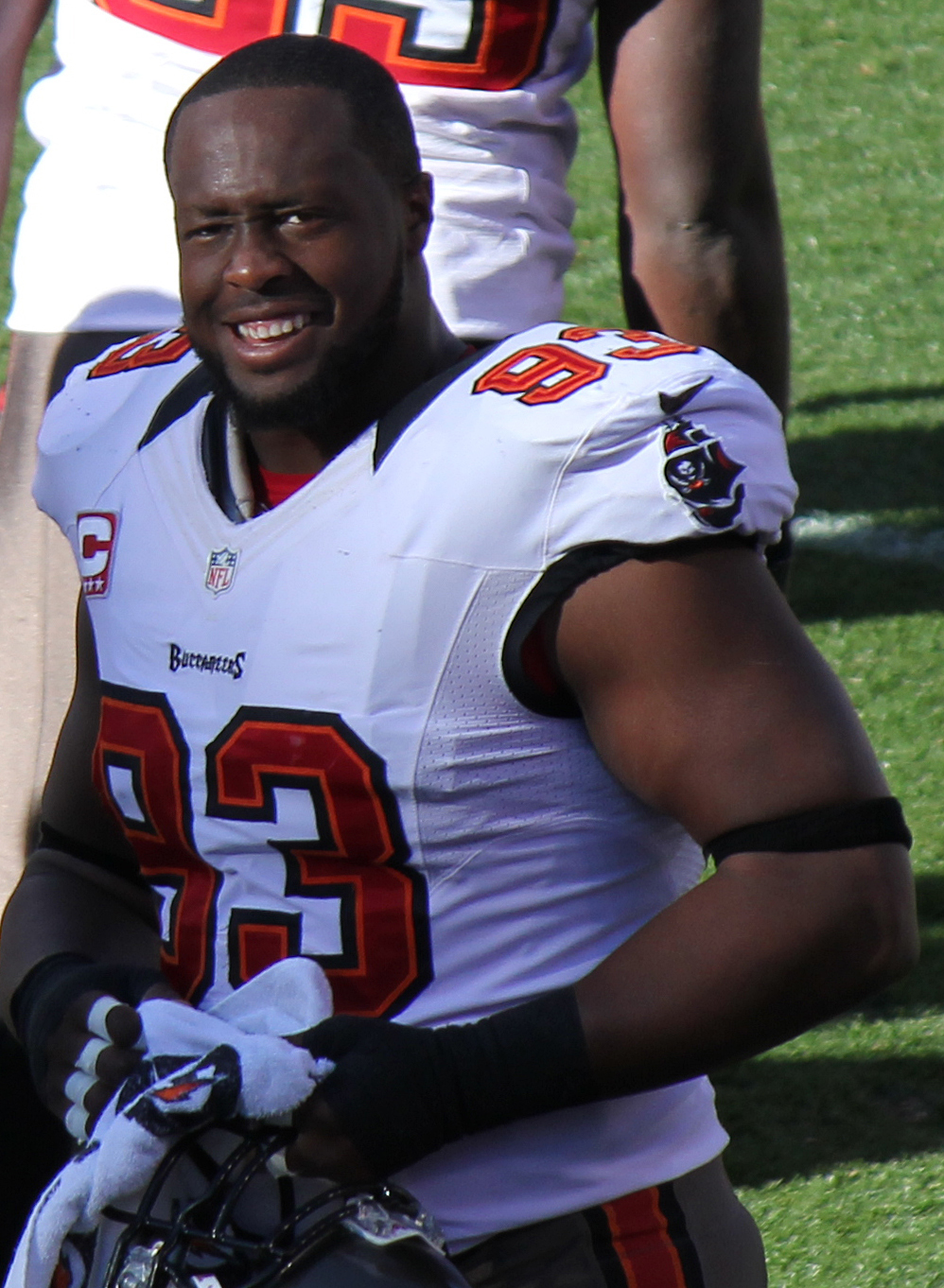
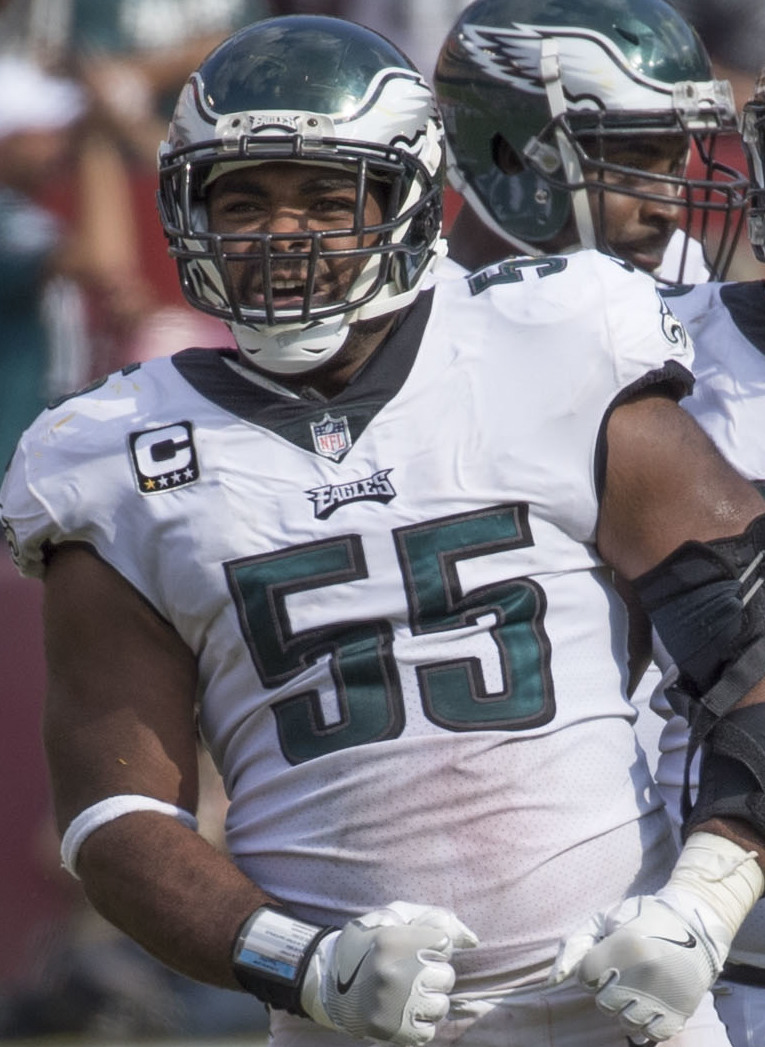
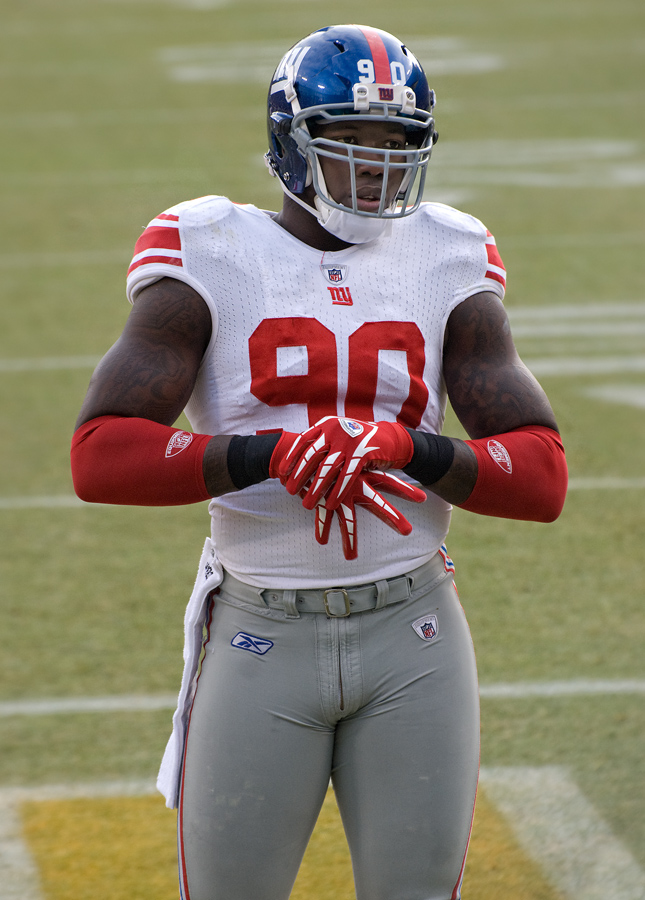
Notable defensive tackles taken early in the draft include (from top to bottom) Ndamukong Suh (2nd overall by Detroit) and Gerald McCoy (3rd overall by Tampa Bay). Defensive ends were Brandon Graham (13th overall by Philadelphia) and Jason Pierre-Paul (15th overall by NY Giants). They have combined for 15 Pro Bowl appearances, 10 All-Pro selections and 5 Super Bowl wins.
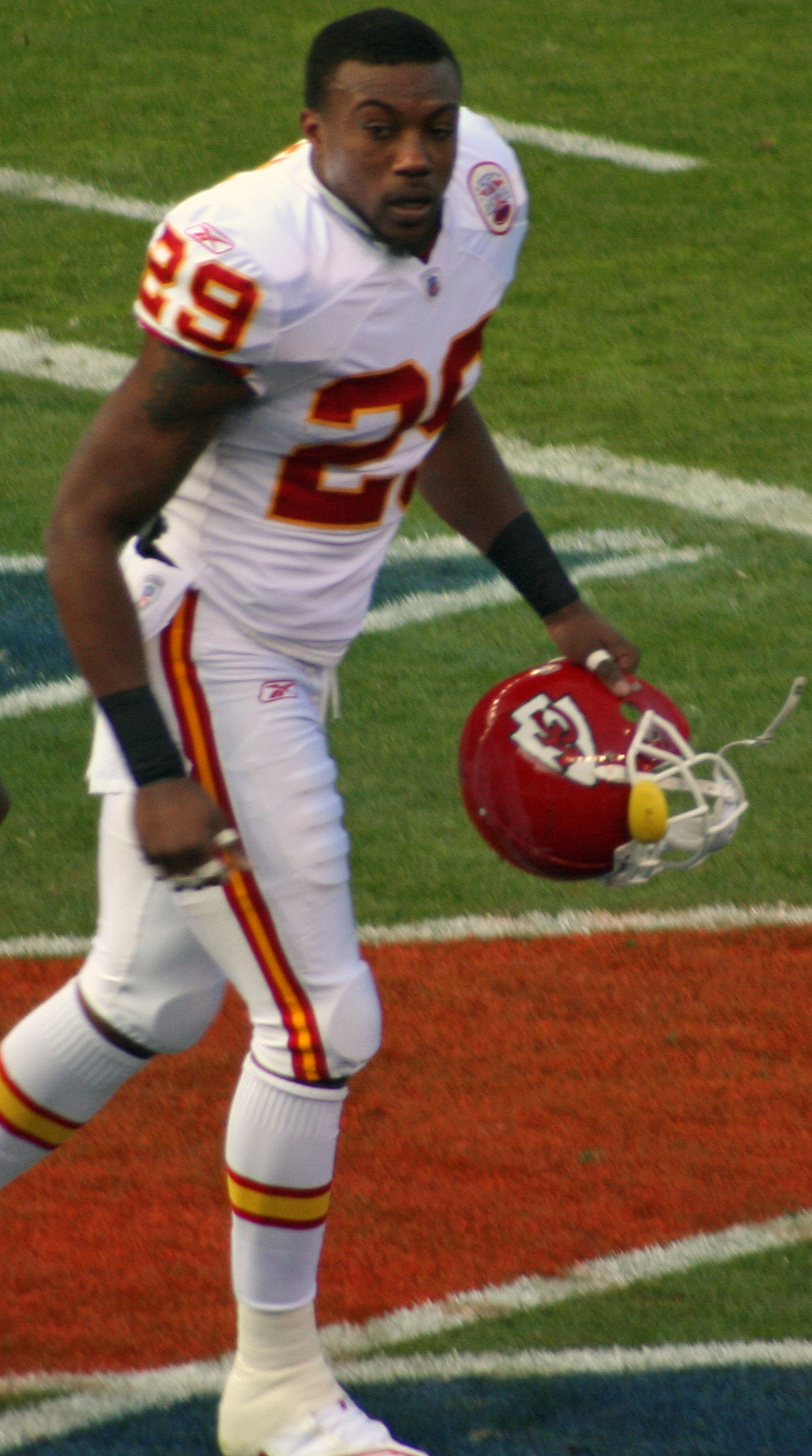
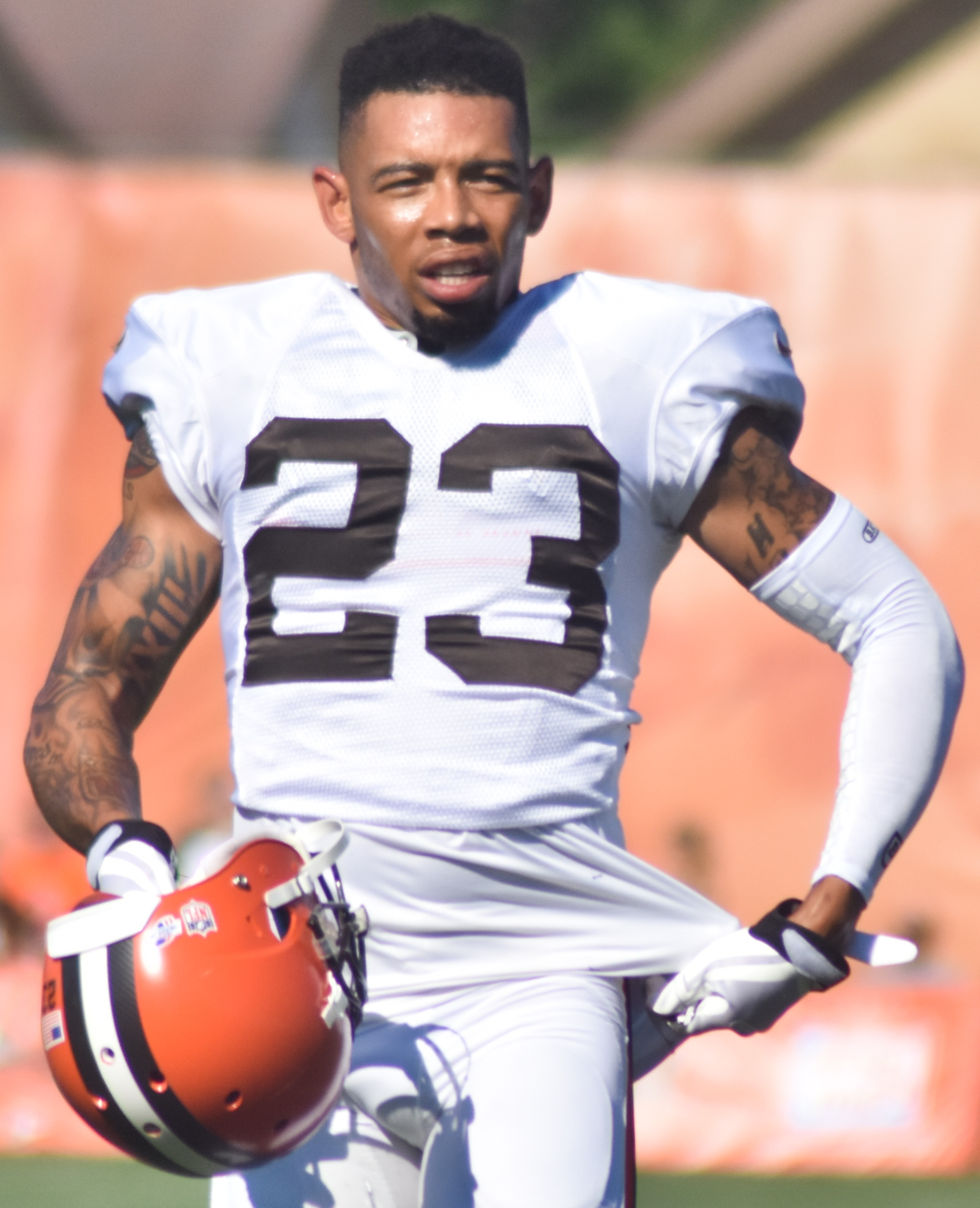
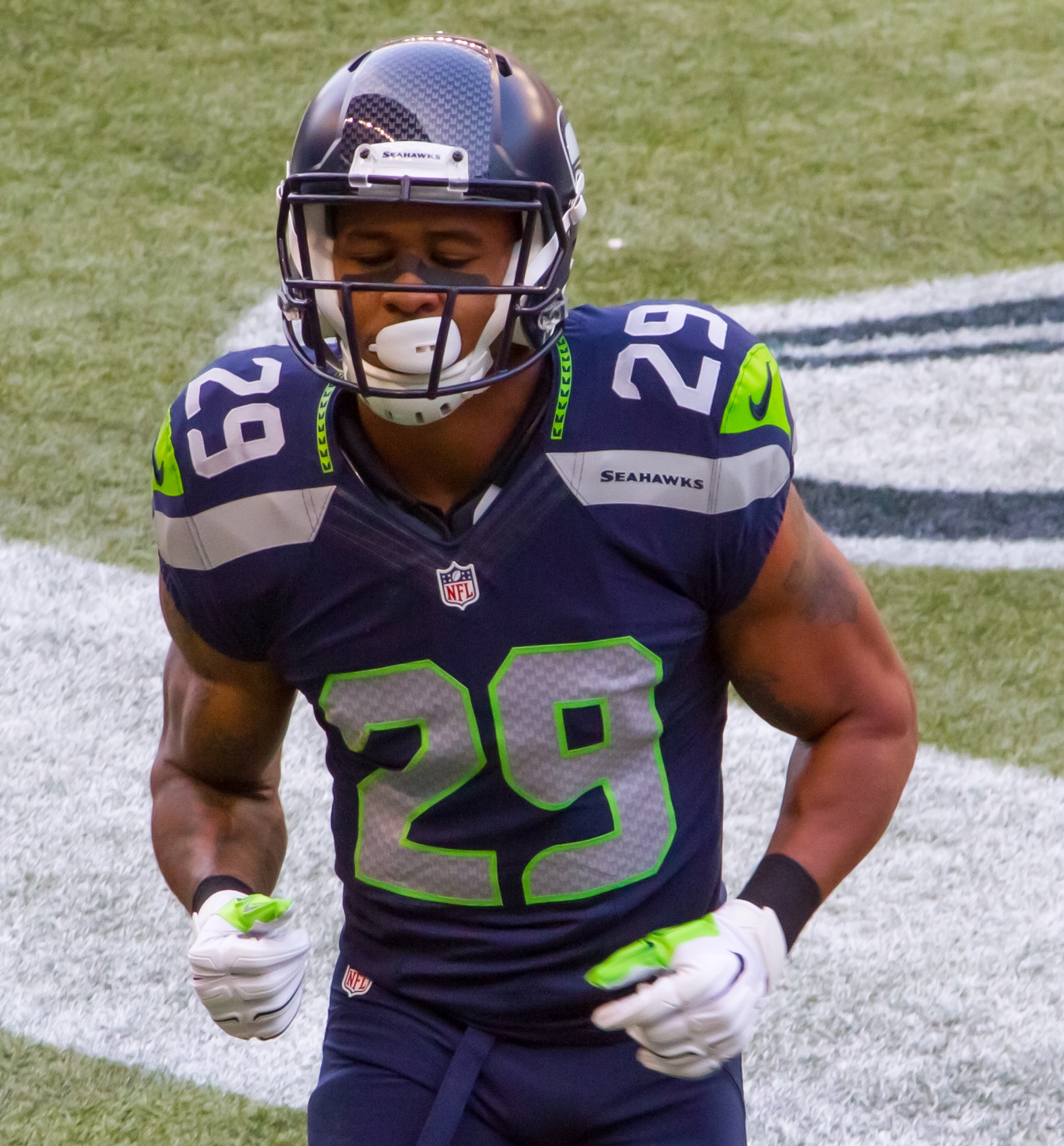
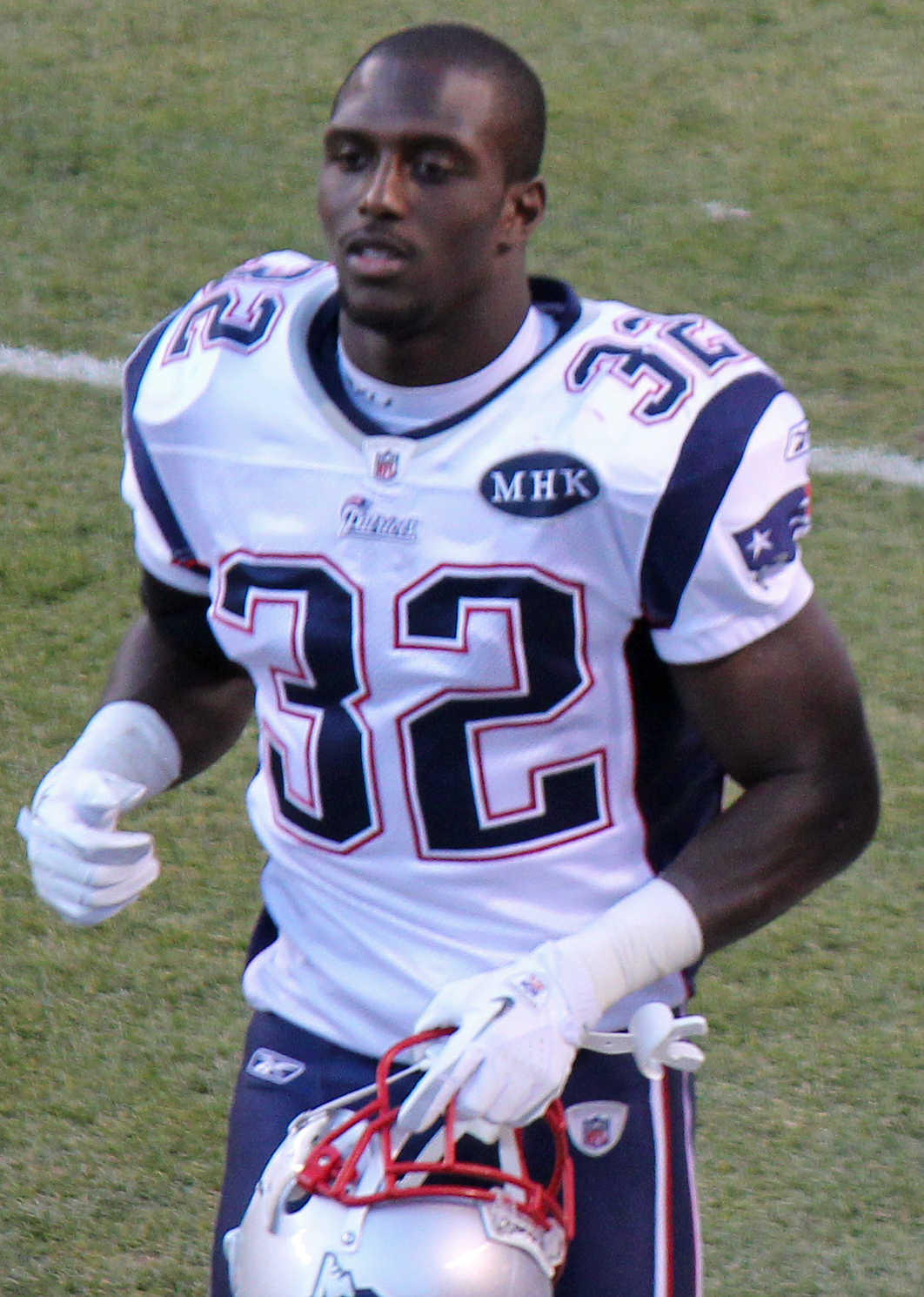
Notable first-round defensive backs include (from top to bottom) Eric Berry (5th overall by Kansas City), Joe Haden (7th overall by Cleveland), Earl Thomas (14th overall by Seattle) and Devin McCourty (27th overall by New England).
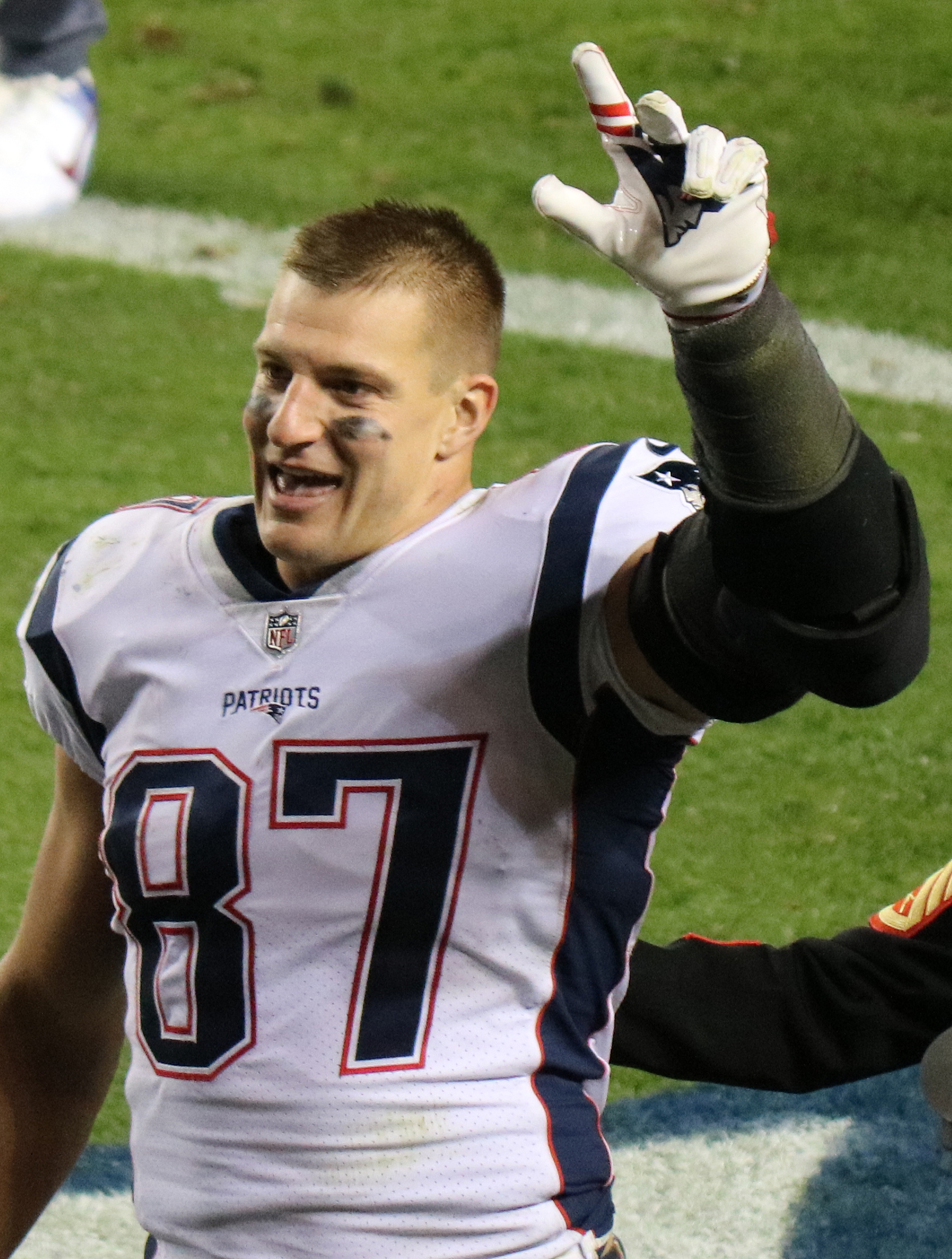
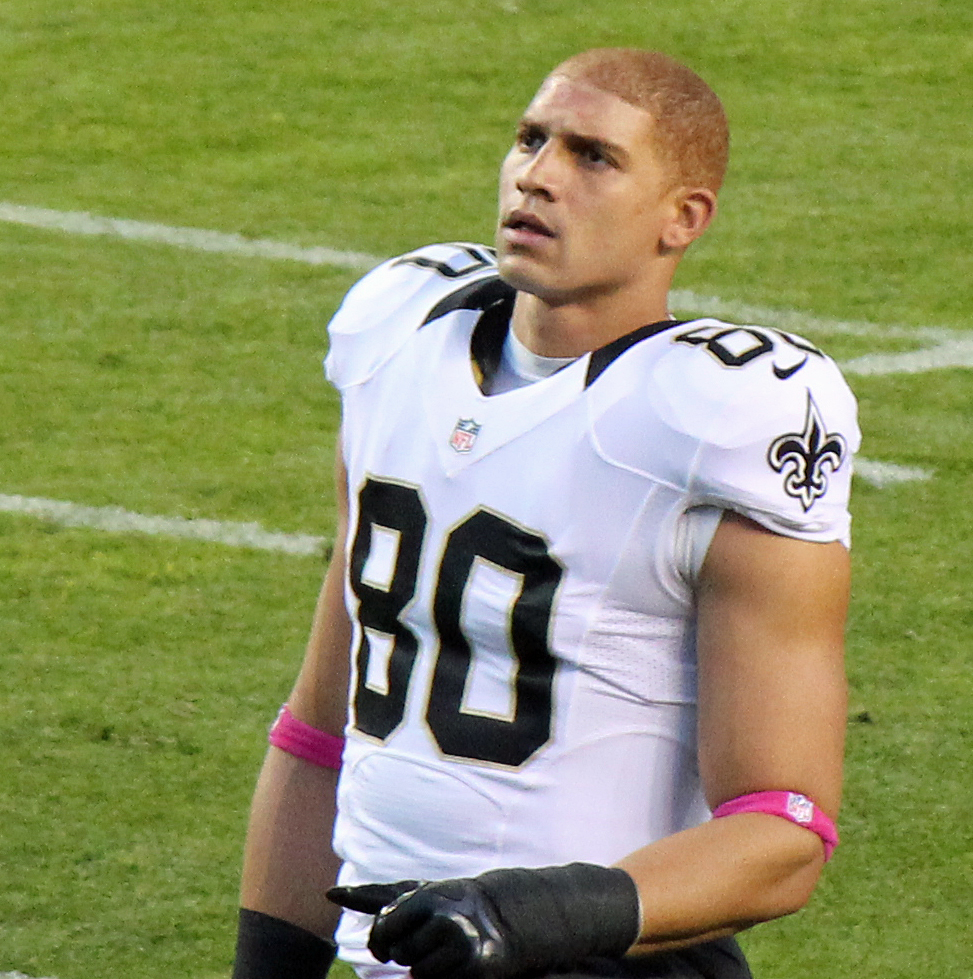
Notable tight ends taken in the draft include Rob Gronkowski (2nd round selection by New England, top) and Jimmy Graham (3rd round selection by New Orleans, bottom)
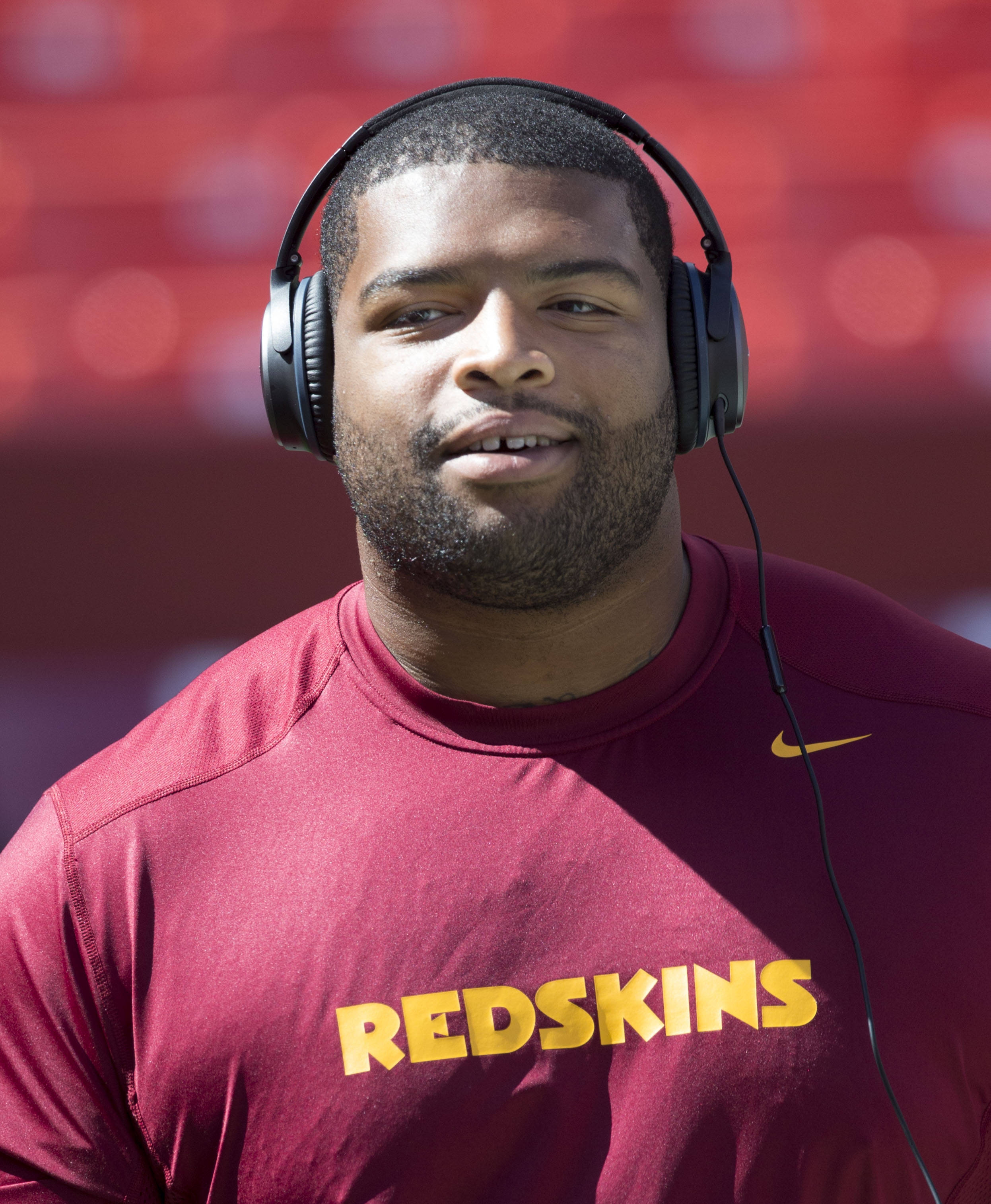
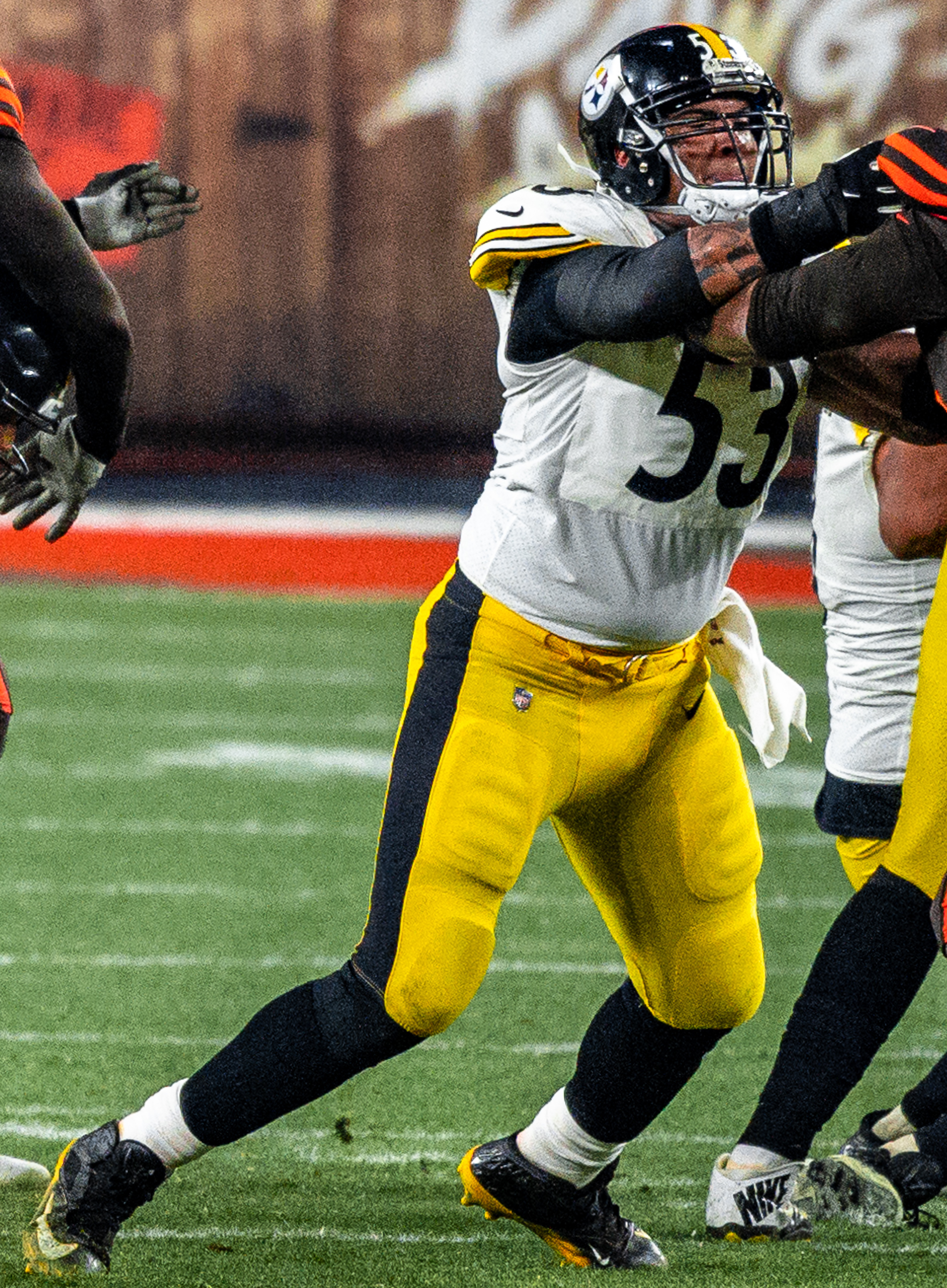
Notable offensive linemen in the first round include left tackle Trent Williams and center Maurkice Pouncey.
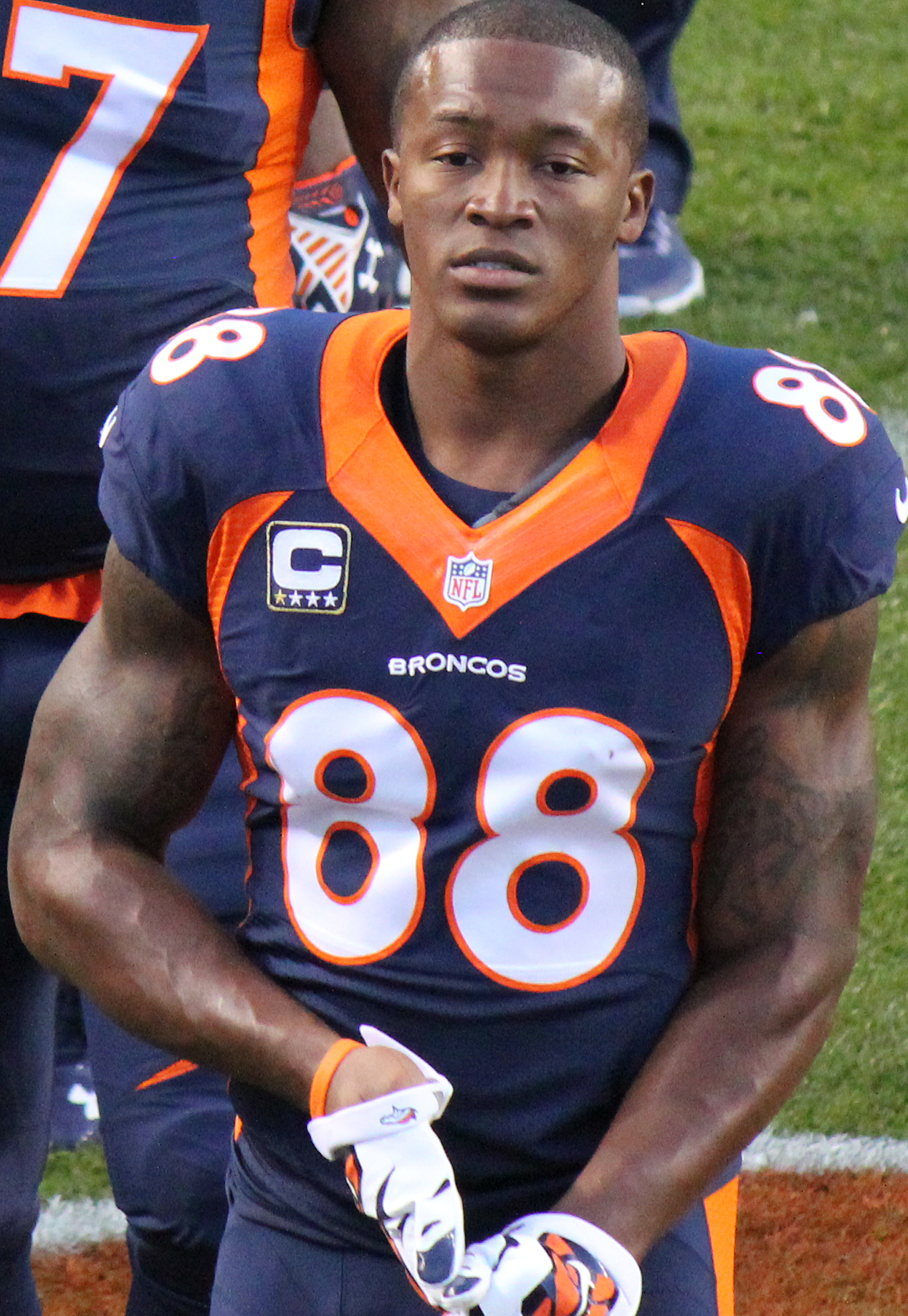
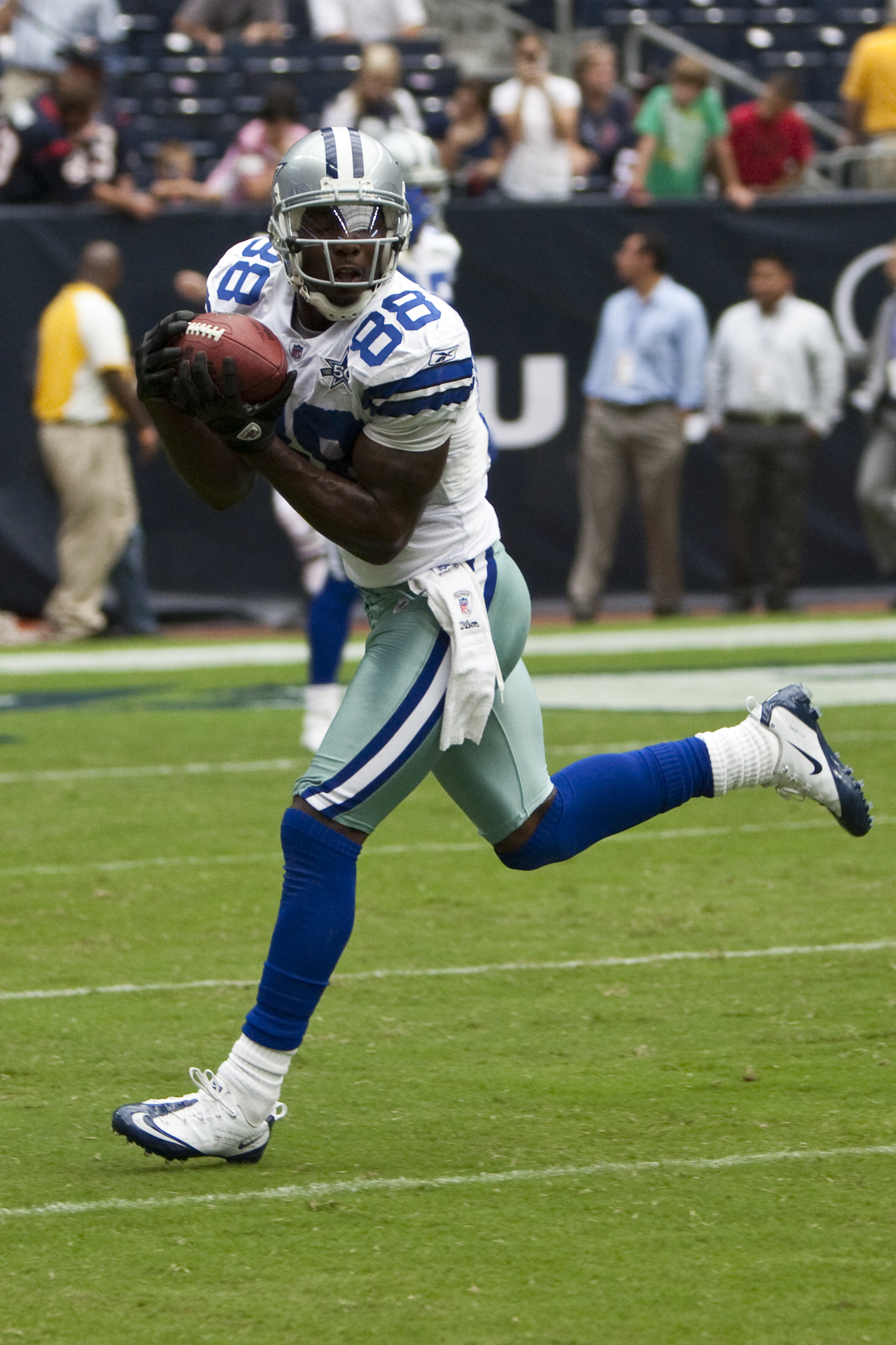
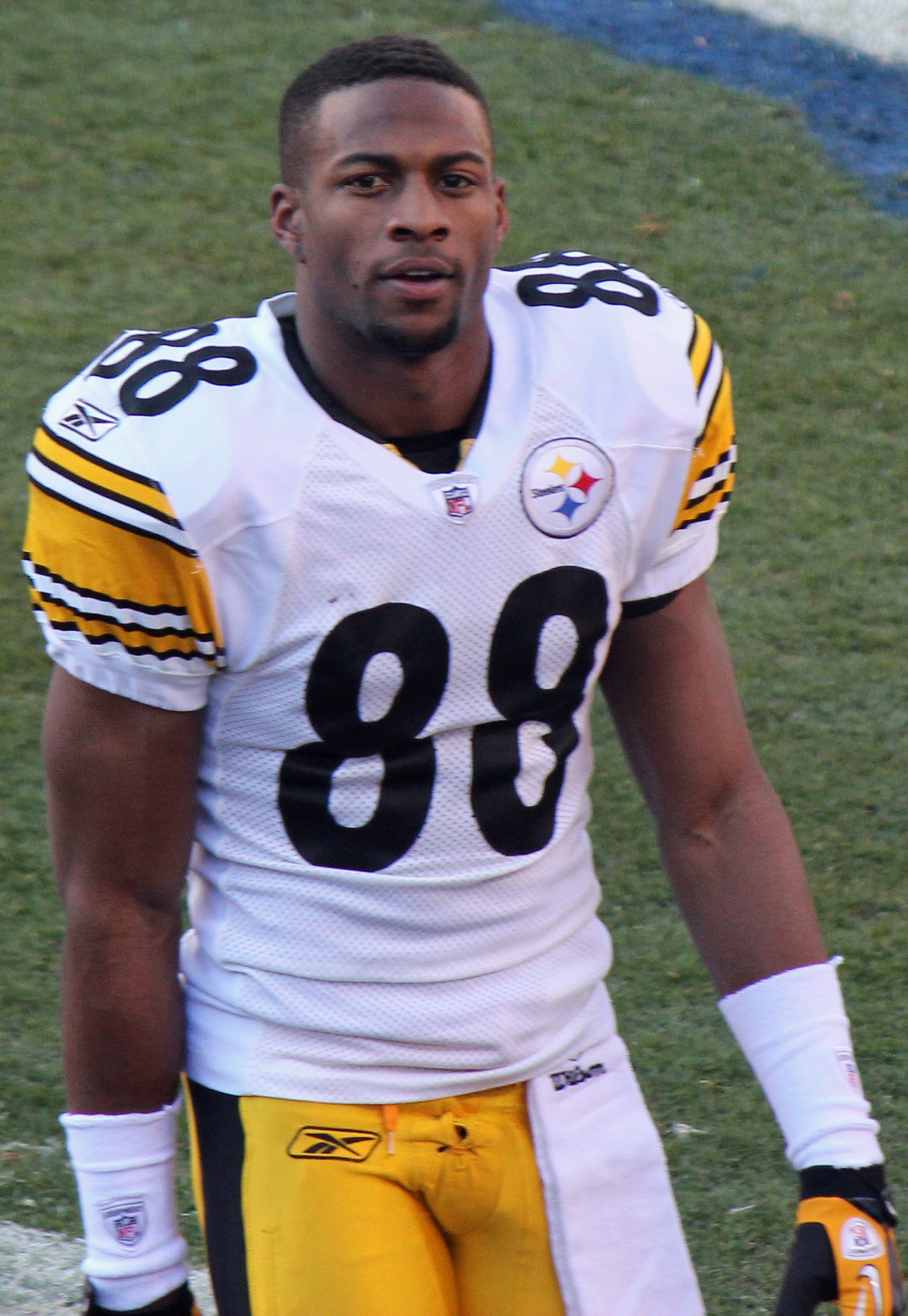
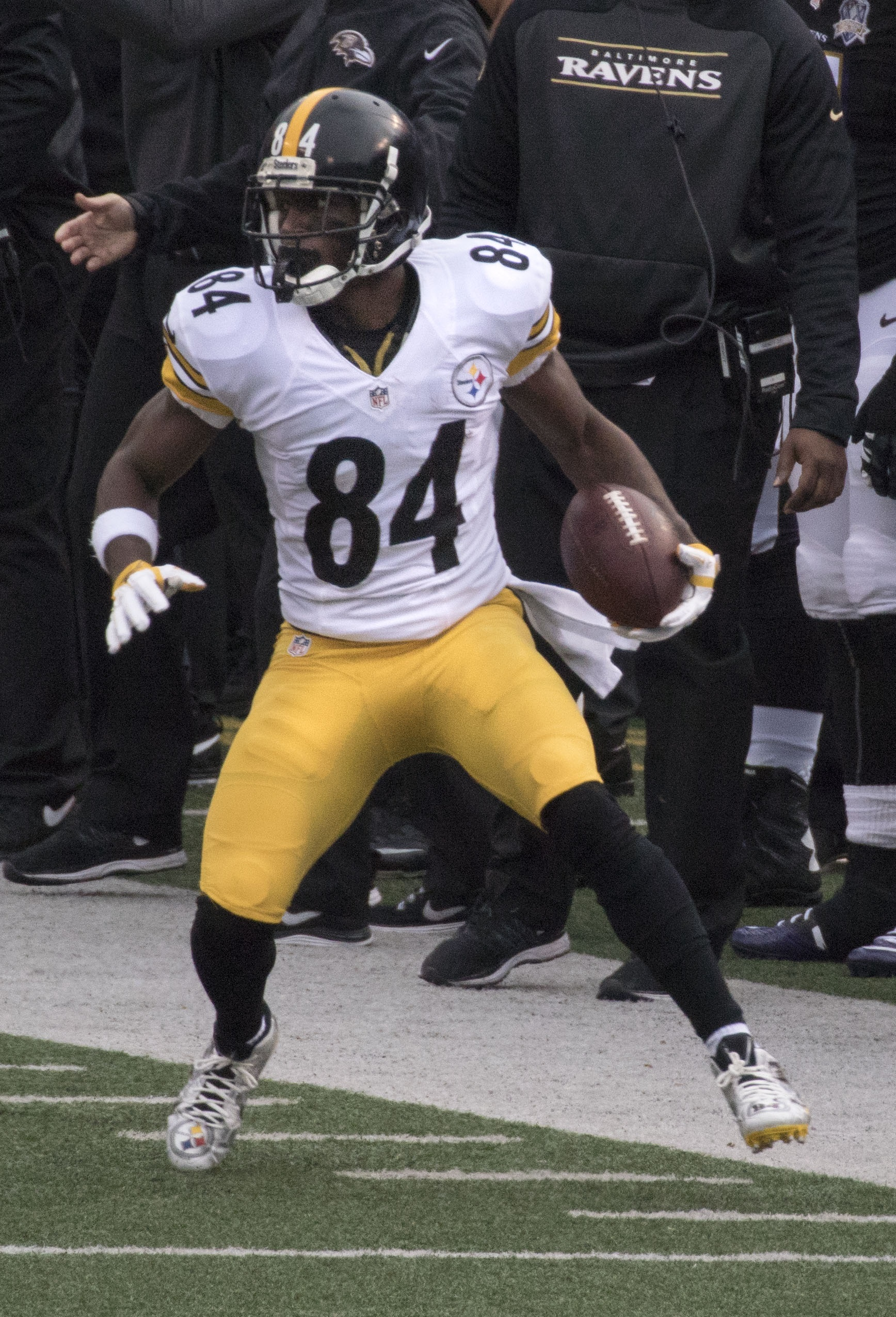
Notable receivers taken include (from top to bottom) Demaryius Thomas (22nd overall by Denver), Dez Bryant (24th overall by Dallas), Emmanuel Sanders (3rd round selection by Pittsburgh) and Antonio Brown (6th round selection by Pittsburgh).

Rnd.	Pick	Team	Player	Pos.	College	Notes
1	1	St. Louis Rams	Sam Bradford	QB	Oklahoma	
1	2	Detroit Lions	Ndamukong Suh ^{†}	DT	Nebraska	
1	3	Tampa Bay Buccaneers	Gerald McCoy ^{†}	DT	Oklahoma	
1	4	Washington Redskins	Trent Williams ^{†}	T	Oklahoma	
1	5	Kansas City Chiefs	Eric Berry ^{†}	S	Tennessee	
1	6	Seattle Seahawks	Russell Okung ^{†}	T	Oklahoma State	
1	7	Cleveland Browns	Joe Haden ^{†}	CB	Florida	
1	8	Oakland Raiders	Rolando McClain	LB	Alabama	
1	9	Buffalo Bills	C. J. Spiller ^{†}	RB	Clemson	
1	10	Jacksonville Jaguars	Tyson Alualu	DT	California	
1	11	San Francisco 49ers	Anthony Davis	T	Rutgers	from Chicago via Denver (Note: No. 11: Chicago → Denver → San Francisco. Multiple trades: Chicago → Denver (PD). Chicago traded a first-round selection (11th overall), 2009 first- and third-round selections (18th and 84th overall), and QB Kyle Orton to Denver in exchange for a 2009 fifth-round selection (140th overall) and QB Jay Cutler. Denver → San Francisco (D). Denver traded a first-round selection (11th overall) to San Francisco in exchange for first- and fourth-round selections (13th and 113th overall).)
1	12	San Diego Chargers	Ryan Mathews ^{†}	RB	Fresno State	from Miami (Note: No. 12: Miami → San Diego (D). Miami traded first- (12th overall), fourth- (110th overall) and sixth-round selections (173rd overall) to San Diego in exchange for first-, second- and fourth-round selections (28th, 40th and 126th overall), and LB Tim Dobbins.)
1	13	Philadelphia Eagles	Brandon Graham ^{†}	DE	Michigan	from San Francisco via Denver (Note: No. 13: San Francisco → Denver → Philadelphia. Multiple trades: San Francisco → Denver (D). See Round 1: Denver → San Francisco. Denver → Philadelphia (D). Denver traded a first-round selection (13th overall) to Philadelphia in exchange for a first-round selection and two third-round selections (24th, 70th and 87th overall).)
1	14	Seattle Seahawks	Earl Thomas ^{†}	S	Texas	from Denver (Note: No. 14: Denver → Seattle (PD). Denver traded a first-round selection (14th overall) to Seattle in exchange for a 2009 second-round selection (37th overall).)
1	15	New York Giants	Jason Pierre-Paul ^{†}	DE	South Florida	
1	16	Tennessee Titans	Derrick Morgan	DE	Georgia Tech	
1	17	San Francisco 49ers	Mike Iupati ^{†}	G	Idaho	from Carolina (Note: No. 17: Carolina → San Francisco (PD). Carolina traded a first-round selection (17th overall) to San Francisco in exchange for 2009 second- and fourth-round selections (43rd and 111th overall).)
1	18	Pittsburgh Steelers	Maurkice Pouncey ^{†}	C	Florida	
1	19	Atlanta Falcons	Sean Weatherspoon	LB	Missouri	
1	20	Houston Texans	Kareem Jackson	CB	Alabama	
1	21	Cincinnati Bengals	Jermaine Gresham ^{†}	TE	Oklahoma	
1	22	Denver Broncos	Demaryius Thomas ^{†}	WR	Georgia Tech	from New England (Note: No. 22: New England → Denver (D). New England traded a first-round selection (22nd overall) to Denver in exchange for first- and fourth-round selections (24th and 113th overall).)
1	23	Green Bay Packers	Bryan Bulaga	T	Iowa	
1	24	Dallas Cowboys	Dez Bryant ^{†}	WR	Oklahoma State	from Philadelphia via Denver and New England (Note: No. 24: Philadelphia → Denver → New England → Dallas. Multiple trades: Philadelphia → Denver (D). See Round 1: Denver → Philadelphia. Denver → New England (D). See Round 1: New England → Denver. New England → Dallas (D). New England traded first- and fourth-round selections (24th and 119th overall) to Dallas in exchange for first- and third-round selections (27th and 90th overall).)
1	25	Denver Broncos	Tim Tebow	QB	Florida	from Baltimore. (Note: #25: Baltimore → Denver (D). Baltimore traded a first-round selection (25th overall) to Denver in exchange for second-, third- and fourth-round selections (43rd, 70th and 114th overall).)
1	26	Arizona Cardinals	Dan Williams	DT	Tennessee	
1	27	New England Patriots	Devin McCourty ^{†}	CB	Rutgers	from Dallas (Note: No. 27: Dallas → New England (D). See Round 1: New England → Dallas.)
1	28	Miami Dolphins	Jared Odrick	DT	Penn State	from San Diego (Note: No. 28: Miami → San Diego (D). See Round 1: Miami → San Diego.)
1	29	New York Jets	Kyle Wilson	CB	Boise State	
1	30	Detroit Lions	Jahvid Best	RB	California	from Minnesota (Note: No. 30: Minnesota → Detroit (D). Minnesota traded first- and fourth-round selections (30th and 128th overall) to Detroit in exchange for second-, fourth- and seventh-round selections (34th, 100th and 214th overall).)
1	31	Indianapolis Colts	Jerry Hughes	DE	TCU	
1	32	New Orleans Saints	Patrick Robinson	CB	Florida State	
2	33	St. Louis Rams	Rodger Saffold ^{†}	T	Indiana	
2	34	Minnesota Vikings	Chris Cook	CB	Virginia	from Detroit (Note: No. 34: Detroit → Minnesota (D). See Round 1: Minnesota → Detroit.)
2	35	Tampa Bay Buccaneers	Brian Price	DT	UCLA	
2	36	Kansas City Chiefs	Dexter McCluster ^{†}	RB	Ole Miss	
2	37	Philadelphia Eagles	Nate Allen	S	South Florida	from Washington (Note: No. 37: Washington → Philadelphia (PD). Washington traded a second-round selection (37th overall) and a 2011 fourth-round selection to Philadelphia in exchange for QB Donovan McNabb.)
2	38	Cleveland Browns	T. J. Ward ^{†}	S	Oregon	
2	39	Tampa Bay Buccaneers	Arrelious Benn	WR	Illinois	from Oakland (Note: No. 39: Oakland → Tampa Bay (D). Oakland traded a second-round selection (39th overall) to Tampa Bay in exchange for second- and fifth-round selections (42nd overall) (153rd overall).)
2	40	Miami Dolphins	Koa Misi	DE	Utah	from Seattle via San Diego (Note: No. 40: Seattle → San Francisco → Miami. Multiple trades: Seattle → San Diego (PD). Seattle traded a second-round selection (40th overall) and a 2011 third-round selection to San Diego in exchange for a second-round selection (60th overall) and QB Charlie Whitehurst. San Diego → Miami (D). See Round 1: Miami → San Diego.)
2	41	Buffalo Bills	Torell Troup	DT	UCF	
2	42	New England Patriots	Rob Gronkowski ^{†}	TE	Arizona	from Chicago via Tampa Bay and Oakland (Note: No. 42: Chicago → Tampa Bay → Oakland → New England Multiple trades: Chicago → Tampa Bay (PD). Chicago traded a second-round selection (42nd overall) to Tampa Bay in exchange for DE Gaines Adams. Tampa Bay → Oakland (D). See Round 2: Oakland → Tampa Bay. Oakland → New England (D). Oakland traded a second-round selection (42nd overall) to New England in exchange for second- and sixth-round selections (44th and 190th overall).)
2	43	Baltimore Ravens	Sergio Kindle	DE	Texas	from Miami via Denver (Note: No. 43: Miami → Denver → Baltimore. Multiple trades: Miami → Denver (PD). Miami traded a second-round selection (43rd overall) and a 2011 second-round selection to Denver in exchange for WR Brandon Marshall. Denver → Baltimore (D). See Round 1: Baltimore → Denver.)
2	44	Oakland Raiders	Lamarr Houston	DE	Texas	from Jacksonville via New England (Note: No. 44: Jacksonville → New England → Oakland. Multiple trades: Jacksonville → New England (PD). Jacksonville traded a second-round selection (44th overall) and a 2009 seventh-round selection to New England in exchange for a 2009 third-round selection (73rd overall). New England → Oakland (D). See Round 2: Oakland → New England.)
2	45	Denver Broncos	Zane Beadles ^{†}	T	Utah	
2	46	New York Giants	Linval Joseph ^{†}	DT	East Carolina	
2	47	Arizona Cardinals	Daryl Washington ^{†}	LB	TCU	from Tennessee via New England (Note: No. 47: Tennessee → New England → Arizona. Multiple trades: Tennessee → New England (PD). Tennessee traded a second-round selection (47th overall) to New England in exchange for a 2009 third-round selection (89th overall). New England → Arizona (D). New England traded a second-round selection (47th overall) to Arizona in exchange for second- and third-round selections (58th and 89th overall).)
2	48	Carolina Panthers	Jimmy Clausen	QB	Notre Dame	
2	49	San Francisco 49ers	Taylor Mays	S	USC	
2	50	Kansas City Chiefs	Javier Arenas	CB	Alabama	from Atlanta (Note: No. 50: Atlanta → Kansas City (PD). Atlanta traded a second-round selection (50th overall) to Kansas City in exchange for TE Tony Gonzalez.)
2	51	Minnesota Vikings	Toby Gerhart	RB	Stanford	from Houston (Note: No. 51: Houston → Minnesota (D). Houston traded a second-round selection (51st overall) to Minnesota in exchange for second- and third-round selections (62nd and 93rd overall).)
2	52	Pittsburgh Steelers	Jason Worilds	DE	Virginia Tech	
2	53	New England Patriots	Jermaine Cunningham	DE	Florida	
2	54	Cincinnati Bengals	Carlos Dunlap ^{†}	DE	Florida	
2	55	Dallas Cowboys	Sean Lee ^{†}	LB	Penn State	from Philadelphia (Note: No. 55: Philadelphia → Dallas (D). Philadelphia traded a second-round selection (55th overall) to Dallas in exchange for second- and fourth-round selections (59th and 125th overall).)
2	56	Green Bay Packers	Mike Neal	DE	Purdue	
2	57	Baltimore Ravens	Terrence Cody	DT	Alabama	
2	58	Houston Texans	Ben Tate	RB	Auburn	from Arizona via New England (Note: No. 58: Arizona → New England → Houston. Multiple trades: Arizona → New England (D). See Round 2: New England → Arizona. New England → Houston (D). New England traded a second-round selection (58th overall) to Houston in exchange for second- and fifth-round selections (62nd and 150th overall).)
2	59	Cleveland Browns	Montario Hardesty	RB	Tennessee	from Dallas via Philadelphia (Note: No. 59: Dallas → Philadelphia → Cleveland. Multiple trades: Dallas → Philadelphia (D). See Round 2: Dallas → Philadelphia. Philadelphia → Cleveland (D). Philadelphia traded a second-round selection (59th overall) to Cleveland in exchange for a third-round selection and two fifth-round selections (71st, 134th and 146th overall).)
2	60	Seattle Seahawks	Golden Tate ^{†}	WR	Notre Dame	from San Diego (Note: No. 60: San Diego → Seattle (PD). See Round 2: Seattle → San Diego.)
2	61	New York Jets	Vladimir Ducasse	T	UMass	
2	62	New England Patriots	Brandon Spikes	LB	Florida	from Minnesota via Houston (Note: No. 62: Minnesota → Houston → New England. Multiple trades: Minnesota → Houston (D). See Round 2: Houston → Minnesota. Houston → New England (D). See Round 2: New England → Houston.)
2	63	Indianapolis Colts	Pat Angerer	LB	Iowa	
2	64	New Orleans Saints	Charles Brown	T	USC	
3	65	St. Louis Rams	Jerome Murphy	CB	South Florida	
3	66	Detroit Lions	Amari Spievey	CB	Iowa	
3	67	Tampa Bay Buccaneers	Myron Lewis	CB	Vanderbilt	
3	–	Washington Redskins	selection forfeited in the 2009 Supplemental draft			
3	68	Kansas City Chiefs	Jon Asamoah	G	Illinois	
3	69	Oakland Raiders	Jared Veldheer	T	Hillsdale	
3	70	Baltimore Ravens	Ed Dickson	TE	Oregon	from Seattle via Philadelphia and Denver (Note: No. 70: Seattle → Philadelphia → Denver → Baltimore. Multiple trades: Seattle → Philadelphia (PD). Seattle traded a third-round selection (70th overall) and 2009 fifth- and seventh-round selections (137th and 213th overall) to Philadelphia in exchange for a 2009 third-round selection. Philadelphia → Denver (D). See Round 1: Denver → Philadelphia. Denver → Baltimore (D). See Round 1: Baltimore → Denver.)
3	71	Green Bay Packers	Morgan Burnett	S	Georgia Tech	from Cleveland via Philadelphia (Note: No. 71: Cleveland → Philadelphia → Green Bay. Multiple trades: Cleveland → Philadelphia (D). See Round 2: Philadelphia → Cleveland. Philadelphia → Green Bay (D). Philadelphia traded a third-round selection (71st overall) to Green Bay in exchange for third- and fourth-round selections (86th and 122nd overall).)
3	72	Buffalo Bills	Alex Carrington	DE	Arkansas State	
3	73	Miami Dolphins	John Jerry	T	Ole Miss	
3	74	Jacksonville Jaguars	D'Anthony Smith	DT	Louisiana Tech	
3	75	Chicago Bears	Major Wright	S	Florida	
3	76	New York Giants	Chad Jones	S	LSU	
3	77	Tennessee Titans	Damian Williams	WR	USC	
3	78	Carolina Panthers	Brandon LaFell	WR	LSU	
3	79	San Diego Chargers	Donald Butler	LB	Washington	from San Francisco (Note: No. 79: San Francisco → San Diego (D). San Francisco traded a third-round selection (79th overall) to San Diego in exchange for third- and sixth-round selections (91st and 173rd overall), and a 2011 fourth-round selection.)
3	80	Denver Broncos	J. D. Walton	C	Baylor	
3	81	Houston Texans	Earl Mitchell	DT	Arizona	
3	82	Pittsburgh Steelers	Emmanuel Sanders ^{†}	WR	SMU	
3	83	Atlanta Falcons	Corey Peters	DT	Kentucky	
3	84	Cincinnati Bengals	Jordan Shipley	WR	Texas	
3	85	Cleveland Browns	Colt McCoy	QB	Texas	from New England via Oakland (Note: No. 85: New England → Oakland → Cleveland. Multiple trades: New England → Oakland (PD). New England traded third- and fifth-round selections (85th and 158th overall) to Oakland in exchange for DE Derrick Burgess. Had the Patriots not acquired a fifth-round selection before the draft, they would have owed Oakland a fourth-round selection.: Oakland → Cleveland (PD). Oakland traded a third-round selection (85th overall) to Cleveland in exchange for DE Kamerion Wimbley.)
3	86	Philadelphia Eagles	Daniel Te'o-Nesheim	DE	Washington	from Green Bay (Note: No. 86: Green Bay → Philadelphia (D). See Round 3: Philadelphia → Green Bay.)
3	87	Denver Broncos	Eric Decker	WR	Minnesota	from Philadelphia (Note: No. 87: Philadelphia → Denver (D). See Round 1: Denver → Philadelphia.)
3	88	Arizona Cardinals	Andre Roberts ^{†}	WR	The Citadel	from Baltimore (Note: No. 88: Baltimore → Arizona (PD). Baltimore traded third- and fourth-round selections (88th and 123rd overall) to Arizona in exchange for a fifth-round selection (157th overall) and WR Anquan Boldin.)
3	89	Carolina Panthers	Armanti Edwards	WR	Appalachian State	from Arizona via New England (Note: No. 89: Arizona → New England → Carolina. Multiple trades: Arizona → New England (D). See Round 2: New England → Arizona. New England → Carolina (D). New England traded a third-round selection (89th overall) to Carolina in exchange for a 2011 second-round selection.)
3	90	New England Patriots	Taylor Price	WR	Ohio	from Dallas (Note: No. 90: Dallas → New England (D). See Round 1: New England → Dallas.)
3	91	San Francisco 49ers	NaVorro Bowman ^{†}	LB	Penn State	from San Diego (Note: No. 91: San Diego → San Francisco (D). See Round 3: San Francisco → San Diego.)
3	92	Cleveland Browns	Shawn Lauvao	T	Arizona State	from NY Jets (Note: No. 92: NY Jets → Cleveland (PD). The NY Jets traded third- and fifth-round selections (92nd and 160th overall), LB Jason Trusnik and WR Chansi Stuckey to Cleveland in exchange for WR Braylon Edwards.)
3	93	Kansas City Chiefs	Tony Moeaki	TE	Iowa	from Minnesota via Houston (Note: No. 93: Minnesota → Houston → Kansas City. Multiple trades: Minnesota → Houston (D). See Round 2: Houston → Minnesota. Houston → Kansas City (D). Houston traded a third-round selection (93rd overall) to Kansas City in exchange for fourth- and fifth-round selections (102nd and 144th overall).)
3	94	Indianapolis Colts	Kevin Thomas	CB	USC	
3	95	New Orleans Saints	Jimmy Graham ^{†}	TE	Miami (FL)	
3*	96	Cincinnati Bengals	Brandon Ghee	CB	Wake Forest	
3*	97	Tennessee Titans	Rennie Curran	LB	Georgia	
3*	98	Atlanta Falcons	Mike Johnson	G	Alabama	
4	99	St. Louis Rams	Mardy Gilyard	WR	Cincinnati	
4	100	Minnesota Vikings	Everson Griffen ^{†}	DE	USC	from Detroit (Note: No. 100: Detroit → Minnesota (D). See Round 1: Minnesota → Detroit.)
4	101	Tampa Bay Buccaneers	Mike Williams	WR	Syracuse	
4	102	Houston Texans	Darryl Sharpton	LB	Miami (FL)	from Kansas City (Note: No. 102: Kansas City → Houston (D). See Round 3: Houston → Kansas City.)
4	103	Washington Redskins	Perry Riley	LB	LSU	
4	104	Tennessee Titans	Alterraun Verner ^{†}	CB	UCLA	from Seattle (Note: No. 104: Seattle → Tennessee (D). Seattle traded fourth- and sixth-round selections (104th and 176th overall) to Tennessee in exchange for fourth- and sixth-round selections (111th and 185th overall), RB LenDale White and DT Kevin Vickerson.)
4	105	Philadelphia Eagles	Trevard Lindley	CB	Kentucky	from Cleveland (Note: No. 105: Cleveland → Philadelphia (PD). Cleveland traded fourth- and fifth-round selections (105th and 137th overall), and LB Alex Hall to Philadelphia in exchange for CB Sheldon Brown and LB Chris Gocong.)
4	106	Oakland Raiders	Bruce Campbell	T	Maryland	
4	107	Buffalo Bills	Marcus Easley	WR	Connecticut	
4	108	Oakland Raiders	Jacoby Ford	WR	Clemson	from Jacksonville (Note: No. 108: Jacksonville → Oakland (D). Jacksonville traded a fourth-round selection (108th overall) to Oakland in exchange for a fifth-round selection (153rd overall) and LB Kirk Morrison.)
4	109	Chicago Bears	Corey Wootton	DE	Northwestern	
4	110	San Diego Chargers	Darrell Stuckey ^{†}	S	Kansas	from Miami (Note: No. 110: Miami → San Diego (D). See Round 1: Miami → San Diego.)
4	111	Seattle Seahawks	Walter Thurmond	CB	Oregon	from Tennessee (Note: No. 111: Tennessee → Seattle (D). See Round 4: Seattle → Tennessee.)
4	112	New York Jets	Joe McKnight	RB	USC	from Carolina (Note: No. 112: Carolina → NY Jets (D). Carolina traded a fourth-round selection (112th overall) to the NY Jets in exchange for fourth- and sixth-round selections (124th and 198th overall).)
4	113	New England Patriots	Aaron Hernandez	TE	Florida	from San Francisco via Denver (Note: No. 113: San Francisco → Denver → New England. Multiple trades: San Francisco → Denver (D). See Round 1: Denver → San Francisco. Denver → New England (D). See Round 1: New England → Denver.)
4	114	Baltimore Ravens	Dennis Pitta	TE	BYU	from Denver (Note: No. 114: Denver → Baltimore (D). See Round 1: Baltimore → Denver.)
4	115	New York Giants	Phillip Dillard	LB	Nebraska	
4	116	Pittsburgh Steelers	Thaddeus Gibson	DE	Ohio State	
4	117	Atlanta Falcons	Joe Hawley	G	UNLV	
4	118	Houston Texans	Garrett Graham	TE	Wisconsin	
4	119	Miami Dolphins	A. J. Edds	LB	Iowa	from New England via Dallas (Note: No. 119: New England → Dallas → Miami. Multiple trades: New England → Dallas (D). See Round 1: New England → Dallas. Dallas → Miami (D). Dallas traded a fourth-round selection (119th overall) to Miami in exchange for fourth- and sixth-round selections (126th and 179th overall).)
4	120	Cincinnati Bengals	Geno Atkins ^{†}	DT	Georgia	
4	121	Philadelphia Eagles	Keenan Clayton	LB	Oklahoma	
4	122	Philadelphia Eagles	Mike Kafka	QB	Northwestern	from Green Bay (Note: No. 122: Green Bay → Philadelphia (D). See Round 3: Philadelphia → Green Bay.)
4	123	New Orleans Saints	Al Woods	DT	LSU	from Baltimore via Arizona (Note: No. 123: Baltimore → Arizona → New Orleans. Multiple trades: Baltimore → Arizona (PD). See Round 3: Baltimore → Arizona. Arizona → New Orleans (D). Arizona traded a fourth-round selection (123rd overall) to New Orleans in exchange for fourth- and sixth-round selections (130th and 201st overall).)
4	124	Carolina Panthers	Eric Norwood	LB	South Carolina	from Arizona via NY Jets (Note: No. 124: Arizona → NY Jets → Carolina. Multiple trades: Arizona → NY Jets (PD). Arizona traded a fourth-round selection (124th overall) and a 2011 seventh-round selection to the NY Jets in exchange for S Kerry Rhodes. NY Jets → Carolina (D). See Round 4: Carolina → NY Jets.)
4	125	Philadelphia Eagles	Clay Harbor	TE	Missouri State	from Dallas (Note: No. 125: Dallas → Philadelphia (D). See Round 2: Dallas → Philadelphia.)
4	126	Dallas Cowboys	Akwasi Owusu-Ansah	CB	IUP	from San Diego via Miami (Note: No. 126: San Diego → Miami → Dallas. Multiple trades: San Diego → Miami (D). See Round 1: Miami → San Diego. Miami → Dallas (D). See Round 4: Dallas → Miami.)
4	127	Seattle Seahawks	E. J. Wilson	DE	North Carolina	from NY Jets via Philadelphia (Note: No. 127: NY Jets → Philadelphia → Seattle. Multiple trades: NY Jets → Philadelphia (PD). The NY Jets traded a conditional fourth-round selection (127th overall) and a 2009 fifth-round selection to Philadelphia in exchange for a fifth-round selection (155th overall) and CB Lito Sheppard. The fourth-round selection could have been as high as the second round; however, Sheppard was released by the Jets on March 4, 2010, to keep the selection in the fourth-round, and saw the Eagles return a fifth-round selection to the Jets. (Note: Waszak, Dennis Jr. (March 4, 2010). "Jets release CB Sheppard after 1 season". Newsday. Associated Press.) Philadelphia → Seattle (PD). Philadelphia traded a fourth-round selection (127th overall) and DE Chris Clemons to Seattle in exchange for DE Darryl Tapp.)
4	128	Detroit Lions	Jason Curtis Fox	T	Miami (FL)	from Minnesota (Note: No. 128: Minnesota → Detroit (D). See Round 1: Minnesota → Detroit.)
4	129	Indianapolis Colts	Jacques McClendon	G	Tennessee	
4	130	Arizona Cardinals	O'Brien Schofield	DE	Wisconsin	from New Orleans Saints (Note: No. 130: New Orleans → Arizona (D). See Round 4: Arizona → New Orleans.)
4*	131	Cincinnati Bengals	Roddrick Muckelroy	LB	Texas	
5	132	St. Louis Rams	Michael Hoomanawanui	TE	Illinois	
5	133	Seattle Seahawks	Kam Chancellor ^{†}	S	Virginia Tech	from Detroit (Note: No. 133: Detroit → Seattle (PD). Detroit traded a fifth-round selection (133rd overall) and DE Robert Henderson to Seattle in exchange for a seventh-round selection (213th overall) and G Rob Sims.)
5	134	Philadelphia Eagles	Ricky Sapp	DE	Clemson	from Tampa Bay via Cleveland (Note: No. 134: Tampa Bay → Cleveland → Philadelphia. Multiple trades: Tampa Bay → Cleveland (PD). Tampa Bay traded a fifth-round selection (134th overall) and a 2009 second-round selection to Cleveland in exchange for TE Kellen Winslow II. Cleveland → Philadelphia (D). See Round 2: Philadelphia → Cleveland.)
5	135	Atlanta Falcons	Dominique Franks	CB	Oklahoma	from Washington via St. Louis (Note: No. 135: Washington → St. Louis → Atlanta. Multiple trades: Washington → St. Louis (PD). Washington traded fifth- and seventh-round selections (135th and 211th overall) to St. Louis in exchange for fifth- (163rd overall) and seventh-round selections (208th overall), and DL Adam Carriker. St. Louis → Atlanta (D). St. Louis traded a fifth-round selection (135th overall) to Atlanta in exchange for fifth- and sixth-round selections (149th and 189th overall).)
5	136	Kansas City Chiefs	Kendrick Lewis	S	Ole Miss	
5	137	Denver Broncos	Perrish Cox	CB	Oklahoma State	from Cleveland via Philadelphia (Note: No. 137: Cleveland → Philadelphia → Denver. Multiple trades: Cleveland → Philadelphia (PD). See Round 4: Cleveland → Philadelphia. Philadelphia → Denver (PD). Philadelphia traded a fifth-round selection (137th overall) to Denver in a three-way trade with Detroit; Philadelphia received LB Ernie Sims, and Detroit received a seventh-round selection (220th overall) and TE Tony Scheffler.)
5	138	Oakland Raiders	Walter McFadden	CB	Auburn	
5	139	New York Jets	John Conner	FB	Kentucky	from Seattle (Note: No. 139: Seattle → NY Jets (D). Seattle traded a fifth-round selection (139th overall) to the NY Jets in exchange for a seventh-round selection (236th overall) and RB Leon Washington.)
5	140	Buffalo Bills	Ed Wang	T	Virginia Tech	
5	141	Chicago Bears	Joshua Moore	CB	Kansas State	
5	142	Kansas City Chiefs	Cameron Sheffield	DE	Troy	from Miami (Note: No. 142: Miami → Kansas City (PD). Miami traded a fifth-round selection (142nd overall) to Kansas City in exchange for QB Tyler Thigpen.)
5	143	Jacksonville Jaguars	Larry Hart	DE	Central Arkansas	
5	144	Houston Texans	Sherrick McManis	CB	Northwestern	from Carolina via Kansas City (Note: No. 144: Carolina → Kansas City → Houston. Multiple trades: Carolina → Kansas City (PD). Carolina traded a fifth-round selection (144th overall) to Kansas City in exchange for DE Tank Tyler. Kansas City → Houston (D). See Round 3: Houston → Kansas City.)
5	145	Miami Dolphins	Nolan Carroll	CB	Maryland	from San Francisco (Note: No. 145: San Francisco → Miami (PD). San Francisco traded a fifth-round selection (145th overall) to Miami for WR Ted Ginn Jr.)
5	146	San Diego Chargers	Cam Thomas	DT	North Carolina	from Denver via Detroit, Cleveland and Philadelphia (Note: No. 146: Denver → Detroit → Cleveland → Philadelphia → San Diego. Multiple trades: Denver → Detroit (PD). Denver traded a fifth-round selection (146th overall) and a 2009 seventh-round selection to Detroit in exchange for a 2009 sixth-round selection. Detroit → Cleveland (PD). Detroit traded a fifth-round selection (146th overall) to Cleveland in exchange for a seventh-round selection (214th overall) and DL Corey Williams. No. 146: Cleveland → Philadelphia (D). See Round 2: Philadelphia → Cleveland. Philadelphia → San Diego (D). Philadelphia traded a fifth-round selection (146th overall) to San Diego in exchange for a fifth-round selection (159th overall) and a 2011 fifth-round selection.)
5	147	New York Giants	Mitch Petrus	G	Arkansas	
5	148	Tennessee Titans	Robert Johnson	S	Utah	
5	149	St. Louis Rams	Hall Davis	DE	Louisiana–Lafayette	from Atlanta (Note: No. 149: Atlanta → St. Louis (D). See Round 5: St. Louis → Atlanta.)
5	150	New England Patriots	Zoltan Mesko	P	Michigan	from Houston (Note: No. 150: Houston → New England (D). See Round 2: New England → Houston.)
5	151	Pittsburgh Steelers	Chris Scott	T	Tennessee	
5	152	Cincinnati Bengals	Otis Hudson	G	Eastern Illinois	
5	153	Jacksonville Jaguars	Austen Lane	DE	Murray State	from New England via Tampa Bay and Oakland (Note: No. 153: New England → Tampa Bay → Oakland → Jacksonville. Multiple trades: New England → Tampa Bay (PD). New England traded a fifth-round selection (153rd overall) to Tampa Bay in exchange for TE Alex Smith. Tampa Bay → Oakland (D). See Round 2: Oakland → Tampa Bay. Oakland → Jacksonville (D). See Round 4: Jacksonville → Oakland.)
5	154	Green Bay Packers	Andrew Quarless	TE	Penn State	
5	155	Arizona Cardinals	John Skelton	QB	Fordham	from Philadelphia via NY Jets and Pittsburgh (Note: No. 155: Philadelphia → NY Jets → Pittsburgh → Arizona. Multiple trades: Philadelphia → NY Jets (PD). See Round 4: NY Jets → Philadelphia. NY Jets → Pittsburgh (PD). The NY Jets traded a fifth-round selection (155th overall) to Pittsburgh in exchange for WR Santonio Holmes. Pittsburgh → Arizona (D). Pittsburgh traded a fifth-round selection (155th overall) to Arizona in exchange for a sixth-round selection (195th overall) and CB Bryant McFadden.)
5	156	Baltimore Ravens	David Reed	WR	Utah	
5	157	Baltimore Ravens	Arthur Jones	DT	Syracuse	from Arizona (Note: No. 157: Arizona → Baltimore (PD). See Round 3: Baltimore → Arizona.)
5	158	New Orleans Saints	Matt Tennant	C	Boston College	from Dallas via Denver, New England, Oakland and Jacksonville (Note: No. 158: Dallas → Denver → New England → Oakland → Jacksonville → New Orleans. Multiple trades: Dallas → Denver (PD). Dallas traded a fifth-round selection (158th overall) to Denver in exchange for G Montrae Holland. Denver → New England (PD). Denver traded a fifth-round selection (158th overall) to New England in exchange for a seventh-round selection (231st overall) and DL Le Kevin Smith. New England → Oakland (PD). See Round 3: Oakland → New England. Oakland → Jacksonville (PD). Oakland traded a fifth-round selection (158th overall) to Jacksonville in exchange for LB Quentin Groves. Jacksonville → New Orleans (D). Jacksonville traded a fifth-round selection (158th overall) to New Orleans in exchange for a 2011 fourth-round selection.)
5	159	Philadelphia Eagles	Riley Cooper	WR	Florida	from San Diego (Note: No. 159: San Diego → Philadelphia (D). See Round 5: Philadelphia → San Diego.)
5	160	Cleveland Browns	Larry Asante	S	Nebraska	from NY Jets (Note: No. 160: NY Jets → Cleveland (PD). See Round 3: NY Jets → Cleveland.)
5	161	Minnesota Vikings	Chris DeGeare	T	Wake Forest	
5	162	Indianapolis Colts	Brody Eldridge	TE	Oklahoma	
5	163	Miami Dolphins	Reshad Jones ^{†}	S	Georgia	from New Orleans via Philadelphia, St. Louis and Washington (Note: No. 163: New Orleans → Philadelphia → St. Louis → Washington → Miami. Multiple trades: New Orleans → Philadelphia (PD). New Orleans traded a fifth-round selection (163rd overall) and a 2009 seventh-round selection to Philadelphia in exchange for a 2009 fifth-round selection (164th overall). Philadelphia → St. Louis (PD). Philadelphia traded a fifth-round selection (163rd overall) and WR Brandon Gibson to St. Louis in exchange for LB Will Witherspoon. St. Louis → Washington (PD). See Round 5: Washington → St. Louis. Washington → Miami (D). Washington traded a fifth-round selection (163rd overall) to Miami in exchange for sixth- and seventh-round selections (174th and 219th overall).)
5*	164	Pittsburgh Steelers	Crezdon Butler	CB	Clemson	
5*	165	Atlanta Falcons	Kerry Meier	WR	Kansas	
5*	166	Pittsburgh Steelers	Stevenson Sylvester	LB	Utah	
5*	167	Minnesota Vikings	Nathan Triplett	LB	Minnesota	
5*	168	San Diego Chargers	Jonathan Crompton	QB	Tennessee	
5*	169	Green Bay Packers	Marshall Newhouse	T	TCU	
6	170	St. Louis Rams	Fendi Onobun	TE	Houston	
6	171	Atlanta Falcons	Shann Schillinger	S	Montana	from Detroit (Note: No. 171: Detroit → Atlanta (PD). Detroit traded a sixth-round selection (171st overall) and a conditional 2011 seventh-round selection to Atlanta in exchange for CB Chris Houston.)
6	172	Tampa Bay Buccaneers	Brent Bowden	P	Virginia Tech	
6	173	San Francisco 49ers	Anthony Dixon	RB	Mississippi State	from Kansas City via Miami and San Diego (Note: No. 173: Kansas City → Miami → San Diego → San Francisco. Multiple trades: Kansas City → Miami (PD). Kansas City traded a sixth-round selection (173rd overall) to Miami in exchange for G Andy Alleman and OL Ikechuku Ndukwe. Miami → San Diego (D). See Round 1: Miami → San Diego. San Diego → San Francisco (D). See Round 3: San Francisco → San Diego.)
6	174	Washington Redskins	Dennis Morris	TE	Louisiana Tech	from Washington via Miami (Note: No. 174: Washington → Miami → Washington. Multiple trades: Washington → Miami (PD). Washington traded a sixth-round selection (174th overall) and a 2009 second-round selection (44th overall) to Miami in exchange for DE Jason Taylor. Miami → Washington (D). See Round 5: Washington → Miami.)
6	175	Carolina Panthers	Greg Hardy ^{†}	DE	Ole Miss	from Oakland (Note: No. 175: Oakland → Carolina (PD). Oakland traded a sixth-round selection (175th overall) and a 2009 seventh-round selection (216th overall) to Carolina in exchange for a 2009 sixth-round selection.)
6	176	Tennessee Titans	Rusty Smith	QB	Florida Atlantic	from Seattle (Note: No. 176: Seattle → Tennessee (D). See Round 4: Seattle → Tennessee.)
6	177	Cleveland Browns	Carlton Mitchell	WR	South Florida	
6	178	Buffalo Bills	Arthur Moats	DE	James Madison	
6	179	Dallas Cowboys	Sam Young	T	Notre Dame	from Miami (Note: No. 179: Miami → Dallas (D). See Round 4: Dallas → Miami.)
6	180	Jacksonville Jaguars	Deji Karim	RB	Southern Illinois	
6	181	Chicago Bears	Dan LeFevour	QB	Central Michigan	
6	182	San Francisco 49ers	Nate Byham	TE	Pittsburgh	
6	183	Denver Broncos	Eric Olsen	C	Notre Dame	
6	184	New York Giants	Adrian Tracy	LB	William & Mary	
6	185	Seattle Seahawks	Anthony McCoy	TE	USC	from Tennessee (Note: No. 185: Tennessee → Seattle (D). See Round 4: Seattle → Tennessee.)
6	186	Cleveland Browns	Clifton Geathers	DE	South Carolina	from Carolina (Note: No. 186: Carolina → Cleveland (PD). Carolina traded a sixth-round selection (186th overall) to Cleveland in exchange for DT Louis Leonard.)
6	187	Houston Texans	Shelley Smith	G	Colorado State	
6	188	Pittsburgh Steelers	Jonathan Dwyer	RB	Georgia Tech	
6	189	St. Louis Rams	Eugene Sims	DE	West Texas A&M	from Atlanta (Note: No. 189: Atlanta → St. Louis (D). See Round 5: St. Louis → Atlanta.)
6	190	Oakland Raiders	Travis Goethel	LB	Arizona State	from New England (Note: No. 190: New England → Oakland (D). See Round 2: Oakland → New England.)
6	191	Cincinnati Bengals	Dezmon Briscoe	WR	Kansas	
6	192	Buffalo Bills	Danny Batten	LB	South Dakota State	from Philadelphia (Note: No. 192: Philadelphia → Buffalo (PD). Philadelphia traded a sixth-round selection (192nd overall), and 2009 first- and fourth-round selections to Buffalo in exchange for OT Jason Peters.)
6	193	Green Bay Packers	James Starks	RB	Buffalo	
6	194	Baltimore Ravens	Ramon Harewood	T	Morehouse	
6	195	Pittsburgh Steelers	Antonio Brown ^{†}	WR	Central Michigan	from Arizona (Note: No. 195: Arizona → Pittsburgh (D). See Round 5: Pittsburgh → Arizona.)
6	196	Dallas Cowboys	Jamar Wall	CB	Texas Tech	
6	197	Houston Texans	Trindon Holliday	WR	LSU	from San Diego (Note: No. 197: San Diego → Houston (PD). San Diego traded a sixth-round selection (197th overall) to Houston in exchange for DE Travis Johnson.)
6	198	Carolina Panthers	David Gettis	WR	Baylor	from NY Jets (Note: No. 198: NY Jets → Carolina (D). See Round 4: Carolina → NY Jets.)
6	199	Minnesota Vikings	Joe Webb	QB	UAB	
6	200	Philadelphia Eagles	Charles Scott	RB	LSU	from Indianapolis (Note: No. 200: Indianapolis → Philadelphia (PD). Indianapolis traded a sixth-round selection (200th overall) to Philadelphia in exchange for a 2009 seventh-round selection.)
6	201	Arizona Cardinals	Jorrick Calvin	CB	Troy	from New Orleans (Note: No. 201: New Orleans → Arizona (D). See Round 4: Arizona → New Orleans.)
6*	202	Carolina Panthers	Jordan Pugh	CB	Texas A&M	
6*	203	Jacksonville Jaguars	Scotty McGee	CB	James Madison	
6*	204	Carolina Panthers	Tony Pike	QB	Cincinnati	
6*	205	New England Patriots	Ted Larsen	C	NC State	
6*	206	San Francisco 49ers	Kyle Williams	WR	Arizona State	
6*	207	Tennessee Titans	Myron Rolle	S	Florida State	
7	208	New England Patriots	Thomas Welch	T	Vanderbilt	from St. Louis via Washington (Note: No. 208: St. Louis → Washington → New England. Multiple trades: St. Louis → Washington (PD). See Round 5: Washington → St. Louis. Washington → New England (D). Washington traded a seventh-round selection (208th overall) to New England in exchange for two seventh-round selections (229th and 231st overall).)
7	209	Buffalo Bills	Levi Brown	QB	Troy	from Detroit (Note: No. 209: Detroit → Buffalo (PD). Detroit traded a seventh-round selection (209th overall) to Buffalo in exchange for S Ko Simpson. (Note: Niyo, John (February 22, 2010). "Net gain in '09 free agency could be Lions' loss in 2010 draft". The Detroit News.))
7	210	Tampa Bay Buccaneers	Cody Grimm	S	Virginia Tech	
7	211	St. Louis Rams	Marquis Johnson	CB	Alabama	from Washington (Note: No. 211: Washington → St. Louis (PD). See Round 5: Washington → St. Louis.)
7	212	Miami Dolphins	Chris McCoy	LB	Middle Tennessee	from Kansas City (Note: No. 212: Kansas City → Miami (PD). Kansas City traded a seventh-round selection (212th overall) to Miami in exchange for a 2009 seventh-round selection (237th overall).)
7	213	Detroit Lions	Willie Young	DE	NC State	from Seattle (Note: No. 213: Seattle → Detroit (PD). See Round 5: Detroit → Seattle.)
7	214	Minnesota Vikings	Mickey Shuler Jr.	TE	Penn State	from Cleveland via Detroit (Note: No. 214: Cleveland → Detroit → Minnesota. Multiple trades: Cleveland → Detroit (PD). See Round 5: Detroit → Cleveland. Detroit → Minnesota (D). See Round 1: Minnesota → Detroit.)
7	215	Oakland Raiders	Jeremy Ware	CB	Michigan State	
7	216	Buffalo Bills	Kyle Calloway	T	Iowa	
7	217	Tampa Bay Buccaneers	Dekoda Watson	LB	Florida State	from Jacksonville (Note: No. 217: Jacksonville → Tampa Bay (PD). Jacksonville traded a seventh-round selection (217th overall) to Tampa Bay in exchange for QB Luke McCown.)
7	218	Chicago Bears	J'Marcus Webb	T	West Texas A&M	
7	219	Washington Redskins	Terrence Austin	WR	UCLA	from Miami (Note: No. 219: Miami → Washington (D). See Round 5: Washington → Miami.)
7	220	Philadelphia Eagles	Jamar Chaney	LB	Mississippi State	from Denver via Detroit (Note: No. 220: Denver → Detroit → Philadelphia. Multiple trades: Denver → Detroit (PD). See Round 5: Philadelphia → Denver. Detroit → Philadelphia (D). Detroit traded a seventh-round selection (220th overall) to Philadelphia in exchange for a 2011 sixth-round selection.)
7	221	New York Giants	Matt Dodge	P	East Carolina	
7	222	Tennessee Titans	Marc Mariani ^{†}	WR	Montana	
7	223	Carolina Panthers	R.J. Stanford	CB	Utah	
7	224	San Francisco 49ers	Phillip Adams	CB	South Carolina State	
7	225	Denver Broncos	Syd'Quan Thompson	CB	California	from Pittsburgh via Tampa Bay (Note: No. 225: Pittsburgh → Tampa Bay → Denver. Multiple trades: Pittsburgh → Tampa Bay (PD). Pittsburgh traded a seventh-round selection (225th overall) to Tampa Bay in exchange for QB Byron Leftwich. Tampa Bay → Denver (D). Tampa Bay traded two seventh-round selections (225th and 232nd overall) to Denver in exchange for a 2011 fifth-round selection.)
7	226	St. Louis Rams	George Selvie	DE	South Florida	from Atlanta (Note: No. 226: Atlanta → St. Louis (PD). Atlanta traded a seventh-round selection (226th overall) to St. Louis in exchange for CB Tye Hill.)
7	227	Houston Texans	Dorin Dickerson	TE	Pittsburgh	
7	228	Cincinnati Bengals	Reggie Stephens	G	Iowa State	
7	229	Washington Redskins	Erik Cook	C	New Mexico	from New England (Note: No. 229: New England → Washington (D). See Round 7: Washington → New England.)
7	230	Green Bay Packers	C. J. Wilson	DE	East Carolina	from Green Bay via NY Jets (Note: No. 230: Green Bay → NY Jets → Green Bay. Multiple trades: Green Bay → NY Jets (PD). Green Bay traded a seventh-round selection (230th overall) and QB Brett Favre to the NY Jets in exchange for a 2009 third-round selection. NY Jets → Green Bay (PD). The NY Jets returned a seventh-round selection (230th overall) to Green Bay in a mutual agreement.)
7	231	Washington Redskins	Selvish Capers	T	West Virginia	from Philadelphia via New England, Denver and New England (Note: No. 231: Philadelphia → New England → Denver → New England → Washington. Multiple trades: Philadelphia → New England (PD). Philadelphia traded a seventh-round selection (231st overall) and WR Greg Lewis to New England in exchange for a 2009 fifth-round selection. New England → Denver (PD). See Round 5: Denver → New England. Denver → New England (PD). Denver traded a seventh-round selection (231st overall) to New England in exchange for C Russ Hochstein. New England → Washington (D). See Round 7: Washington → New England.)
7	232	Denver Broncos	Jammie Kirlew	DE	Indiana	from Baltimore via Tampa Bay (Note: No. 232: Baltimore → Tampa Bay → Denver. Multiple trades: Baltimore → Tampa Bay (PD). Baltimore traded a seventh-round selection (232nd overall) and a 2009 seventh-round selection to Tampa Bay in exchange for DL Marques Douglas. Tampa Bay → Denver (D). See Round 7: Tampa Bay → Denver.)
7	233	Arizona Cardinals	Jim Dray	TE	Stanford	
7	234	Dallas Cowboys	Sean Lissemore	DT	William & Mary	
7	235	San Diego Chargers	Dedrick Epps	TE	Miami (FL)	
7	236	Seattle Seahawks	Dexter Davis	LB	Arizona State	from NY Jets (Note: No. 236: NY Jets → Seattle (D). See Round 5: Seattle → NY Jets.)
7	237	Minnesota Vikings	Ryan D'Imperio	LB	Rutgers	
7	238	Indianapolis Colts	Ricardo Mathews	DT	Cincinnati	
7	239	New Orleans Saints	Sean Canfield	QB	Oregon State	
7*	240	Indianapolis Colts	Kavell Conner	LB	Clemson	
7*	241	Tennessee Titans	David Howard	DT	Brown	
7*	242	Pittsburgh Steelers	Doug Worthington	DT	Ohio State	
7*	243	Philadelphia Eagles	Jeff Owens	DT	Georgia	
7*	244	Philadelphia Eagles	Kurt Coleman	S	Ohio State	
7*	245	Seattle Seahawks	Jameson Konz	FB	Kent State	
7*	246	Indianapolis Colts	Ray Fisher	CB	Indiana	
7*	247	New England Patriots	Brandon Deaderick	DT	Alabama	
7*	248	New England Patriots	Kade Weston	DT	Georgia	
7*	249	Carolina Panthers	Robert McClain	CB	Connecticut	
7*	250	New England Patriots	Zac Robinson	QB	Oklahoma State	
7*	251	Oakland Raiders	Stevie Brown	S	Michigan	
7*	252	Miami Dolphins	Austin Spitler	LB	Ohio State	
7*	253	Tampa Bay Buccaneers	Erik Lorig	DE	Stanford	
7^	254	St. Louis Rams	Josh Hull	LB	Penn State	
7^	255	Detroit Lions	Tim Toone	WR	Weber State	

== Trades ==
In the explanations below, (D) denotes trades that took place during the draft, while (PD) indicates trades completed pre-draft.

Round 1

Round 2

Round 3

Round 4

Round 5

Round 6

Round 7

== Supplemental draft selections ==
Two players were selected in the 2010 Supplemental Draft.

Rnd.	Pick	Team	Player	Pos.	College	Notes
7	—	Chicago Bears	Harvey Unga	RB	BYU	The Bears forfeited their seventh-round selection in the 2011 draft.
7	—	Dallas Cowboys	Josh Brent	DT	Illinois	The Cowboys forfeited their seventh-round selection in the 2011 draft.

== Notable undrafted players ==
Original NFL team	Player	Pos.	College	Notes
Arizona Cardinals	Max Hall	QB	BYU	
Arizona Cardinals	Max Komar	WR	Idaho	
Arizona Cardinals	Alfonso Smith	RB	Kentucky	
Arizona Cardinals	Stephen Williams	WR	Toledo	
Atlanta Falcons	Rafael Bush	S	South Carolina State	
Atlanta Falcons	Justin Drescher	LS	Colorado	
Atlanta Falcons	Dimitri Nance	RB	Arizona State	
Atlanta Falcons	Michael Palmer	TE	Clemson	
Baltimore Ravens	Morgan Cox ^{†}	LS	Tennessee	
Buffalo Bills	Joique Bell	RB	Wayne State	
Buffalo Bills	Donald Jones	WR	Youngstown State	
Buffalo Bills	David Nelson	WR	Florida	
Buffalo Bills	Naaman Roosevelt	WR	Buffalo	
Carolina Panthers	Andre Neblett	DT	Temple	
Chicago Bears	Cornelius Brown	CB	UTEP	
Cincinnati Bengals	James Develin ^{†}	FB	Brown	
Cincinnati Bengals	Vincent Rey	LB	Duke	
Cleveland Browns	Brian Sanford	DE	Temple	
Cleveland Browns	Martin Tevaseu	NT	UNLV	
Dallas Cowboys	Barry Church	S	Toledo	
Dallas Cowboys	Phil Costa	C	Maryland	
Dallas Cowboys	Chris Gronkowski	FB	Arizona	
Dallas Cowboys	Danny McCray	S	LSU	
Dallas Cowboys	Andrew Sendejo	S	Rice	
Dallas Cowboys	Verran Tucker	WR	California	
Denver Broncos	Ben Garland	C	Air Force	
Detroit Lions	Aaron Berry	CB	Pittsburgh	
Green Bay Packers	Anthony Levine	S	Tennessee State	
Green Bay Packers	Nick McDonald	C	Grand Valley State	
Green Bay Packers	Quinn Porter	RB	Stillman	
Green Bay Packers	Sam Shields ^{†}	CB	Miami (FL)	
Green Bay Packers	Chastin West	WR	Fresno State	
Green Bay Packers	Frank Zombo	LB	Central Michigan	
Houston Texans	Mitch Unrein	DT	Wyoming	
Indianapolis Colts	Javarris James	RB	Miami (FL)	
Indianapolis Colts	Jeffrey Linkenbach	T	Cincinnati	
Indianapolis Colts	Blair White	WR	Michigan State	
Kansas City Chiefs	Justin Cole	DE	San Jose State	
Jacksonville Jaguars	Mike Caussin	TE	James Madison	
Jacksonville Jaguars	Josh Gordy	CB	Central Michigan	
Jacksonville Jaguars	Robert Malone	P	Fresno State	
Miami Dolphins	Jonathon Amaya	S	Nevada	
Miami Dolphins	Marlon Moore	WR	Fresno State	
Miami Dolphins	Roberto Wallace	WR	San Diego State	
Minnesota Vikings	Marcus Sherels	CB	Minnesota	
New England Patriots	Dane Fletcher	LB	Montana State	
New Orleans Saints	Junior Galette	LB	Stillman	
New Orleans Saints	Clint Gresham	LS	Texas Christian	
New Orleans Saints	Chris Ivory ^{†}	RB	Tiffin	
New York Giants	Jake Ballard	TE	Ohio State	
New York Giants	Nate Collins	DT	Virginia	
New York Giants	Victor Cruz ^{†}	WR	UMass	
New York Jets	Jeff Cumberland	TE	Illinois	
Oakland Raiders	Kellen Heard	DT	Memphis	
Philadelphia Eagles	Austin Howard	T	Northern Iowa	
Philadelphia Eagles	Alejandro Villanueva ^{†}	DE	Army	
San Diego Chargers	Carl Ihenacho	LB	San Jose State	
San Diego Chargers	Bryan Walters	WR	Cornell	
San Francisco 49ers	Tramaine Brock	CB	Belhaven	
San Francisco 49ers	Chris Maragos	S	Wisconsin	
Seattle Seahawks	Lemuel Jeanpierre	C	South Carolina	
Seattle Seahawks	Will Tukuafu	DT	Oregon	
St. Louis Rams	Thad Lewis	QB	Duke	
St. Louis Rams	Darian Stewart ^{†}	S	South Carolina	
Tampa Bay Buccaneers	Andrew DePaola ^{†}	LS	Rutgers	
Tampa Bay Buccaneers	Derek Hardman	G	Eastern Kentucky	
Tampa Bay Buccaneers	George Johnson	DE	Rutgers	
Tampa Bay Buccaneers	Jeron Mastrud	TE	Kansas State	
Tampa Bay Buccaneers	Preston Parker	WR	Florida State	
Tennessee Titans	LeGarrette Blount	RB	Oregon	
Tennessee Titans	Kevin Matthews	C	Texas A&M	
Washington Redskins	Brandon Banks	WR	Kansas State	
Washington Redskins	Logan Paulsen	TE	UCLA	
Washington Redskins	Keiland Williams	RB	LSU	

== Selections by college conference ==
Selection totals by college conference:

Rank	Conference	Players selected	Division
1	Southeastern Conference	49	I FBS
2	Big Ten Conference	34	I FBS
3	Atlantic Coast Conference	31	I FBS
4	Big 12 Conference	30	I FBS
5	Pac-10 Conference	28	I FBS
6	Big East Conference	18	I FBS
7	Mountain West Conference	13	I FBS
8	Conference USA	7	I FBS
8	Sun Belt Conference	7	I FBS
10	Mid-American Conference	5	I FBS
10	Western Athletic Conference	5	I FBS
10	Colonial Athletic Association	5	I FCS
13	Independent	4	I FBS
14	Big Sky Conference	3	I FCS
14	Missouri Valley Conference	3	I FCS
16	Ohio Valley Conference	2	I FCS
16	Southern Conference	2	I FCS
16	Lone Star Conference	2	II
19	Ivy League	1	I FCS
19	Mid-Eastern Athletic Conference	1	I FCS
19	Patriot League	1	I FCS
19	Southland Conference	1	I FCS
19	Great Lakes Intercollegiate Athletic Conference	1	II
19	Pennsylvania State Athletic Conference	1	II
19	Southern Intercollegiate Athletic Conference	1	II

== See also ==
- List of first overall National Football League draft picks
- Mr. Irrelevant – the list of last overall National Football League draft picks
