= 2009 UT Martin Skyhawks football team =

American college football season

2009 UT Martin Skyhawks football
- Conference: Ohio Valley Conference
- Record: 5–6 (4–4 OVC)
- Head coach: Jason Simpson (4th season)
- Defensive coordinator: Chris Boone (4th season)
- Home stadium: Graham Stadium

2009 Ohio Valley Conference football standings
	Conf.			Overall
Team	W		L	W		L
No. 16 Jacksonville State	6	–	1	8	–	3
No. 19 Eastern Illinois $^	6	–	2	8	–	4
Tennessee Tech	5	–	3	6	–	5
Eastern Kentucky	5	–	3	5	–	6
UT Martin	4	–	4	5	–	6
Tennessee State	3	–	4	4	–	7
Austin Peay	3	–	5	4	–	7
Murray State	2	–	6	3	–	8
Southeast Missouri State	1	–	7	2	–	9
$ – Conference champion; ^ – FCS playoff participant; Jacksonville State had the best record in conference play, but was not eligible for the FCS playoffs because of APR violations.; Rankings from The Sports Network poll

The 2009 UT Martin Skyhawks football team represented the University of Tennessee at Martin as a member of the Ohio Valley Conference (OVC) during the 2009 NCAA Division I FCS football season. Led by fourth-year head coach Jason Simpson, the Skyhawks compiled an overall record of 5–6 with a mark of 4–4 in conference play finishing in fifth place in the OVC. UT Martin played home games at Graham Stadium in Martin, Tennessee.

== Schedule ==
Date	Time	Opponent	Site	Result	Attendance	Source
September 3	6:00 pm	Iowa Wesleyan*	Graham Stadium; Martin, TN	W 56–0	5,842	
September 12	3:00 pm	at Missouri State*	Plaster Sports Complex; Springfield, MO	L 14–24	9,357	
September 19	7:30 pm	at Memphis*	Liberty Bowl Memorial Stadium; Memphis, TN	L 14–41	21,428	
September 26	6:00 pm	Southeast Missouri State	Graham Stadium; Martin, TN	W 29–22	4,269	
October 3	1:00 pm	at No. 20 Jacksonville State	Paul Snow Stadium; Jacksonville, AL	L 7–52	13,086	
October 10	2:00 pm	Tennessee Tech	Graham Stadium; Martin, TN (Sgt. York Trophy)	L 28–35	6,137	
October 17	2:00 pm	at No. 23 Eastern Kentucky	Roy Kidd Stadium; Richmond, KY	L 25–31	7,400	
October 24	6:00 pm	Murray State	Graham Stadium; Martin, TN	W 38–24	3,142	
November 7	5:00 pm	Tennessee State	Nissan Stadium; Nashville, TN (Sgt. York Trophy)	W 28–7	22,092	
November 14	1:30 pm	at No. 13 Eastern Illinois	O'Brien Field; Charleston, IL	L 13–49	5,346	
November 21	1:00 pm	Austin Peay	Graham Stadium; Martin, TN (Sgt. York Trophy)	W 48–38	4,120	
*Non-conference game; Rankings from The Sports Network Poll released prior to the game; All times are in Central time
