= Rick Christophel =

American football player and coach (born 1952)

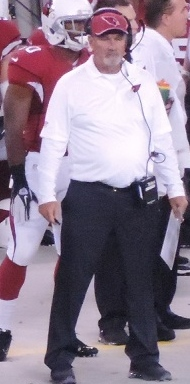
- Christophel in 2014

Tampa Bay Buccaneers
- Title: Senior offensive assistant

Personal information
- Born: October 27, 1952 (age 74); Reading, Ohio, U.S.

Career information
- High school: Reading
- College: Austin Peay

Career history
- Austin Peay (1975) Graduate assistant; Highlands HS (Fort Thomas, KY) (1976–1978) Assistant; Austin Peay (1979–1981) Running backs; Southern Arkansas (1982) Offensive coordinator; Cincinnati (1983) Quarterbacks/tight ends; Rice (1984–1985) Quarterbacks/running backs; Vanderbilt (1986–1988) Offensive line; Vanderbilt (1989) Defensive coordinator/middle linebackers; Vanderbilt (1990) Offensive line/Assistant head coach; Mississippi State (1991–1994) Wide receivers; UAB (1995–1996) Offensive coordinator/running backs; UAB (1997–1998) Wide receivers; UAB (1999) Offensive line/tight ends; UAB (2000) Wide receivers; UAB (2001) Defensive coordinator; UAB (2004) Offensive line/defensive line; UAB (2005) Defensive line/assistant head coach; UAB (2006) Defensive coordinator; Austin Peay (2007–2012) Head coach; Arizona Cardinals (2013–2017) Tight ends; Tampa Bay Buccaneers (2019–2021) Tight ends; Tampa Bay Buccaneers (2022–present) Senior offensive assistant

Awards and highlights
- Super Bowl champion (LV)

Head coaching record
- Regular season: 20–46 (.303)
- Career: 20–46 (.303)

Rick Scott Christophel (born October 27, 1952) is an American football coach and former player. He is currently the senior offensive assistant for the Tampa Bay Buccaneers of the National Football League (NFL). In college, he was a quarterback for Austin Peay State University from 1971 to 1974. He also previously served as head football coach at Austin Peay from 2007 to 2012, compiling a record of 20–46.

== College career ==
Christophel was the starting quarterback at Austin Peay from 1971 to 1974. After a year as a graduate assistant at his alma mater, he spent three seasons coaching at Highlands High School in Fort Thomas, Kentucky from 1976 to 1978. He returned to Austin Peay as an assistant coach for three seasons (1979 to 1981), before making coaching stops at Southern Arkansas State (1982), Cincinnati (1983), Rice (1984 to 1985), and Vanderbilt (1986 to 1990). He then was an assistant coach at Mississippi State from 1991 to 1994, where he worked under Bruce Arians, who became the offensive coordinator there in 1993.. He then moved to the University of Alabama at Birmingham, where he spent 12 seasons, from 1995 to 2006, before returning to Austin Peay as head coach in 2007.

== Head coaching record ==
Year	Team	Overall	Conference	Standing	Bowl/playoffs
Austin Peay Governors (Ohio Valley Conference) (2007–2012)
2007	Austin Peay	7–4	5–3	T–3rd	
2008	Austin Peay	2–9	2–6	8th	
2009	Austin Peay	4–7	3–5	6th	
2010	Austin Peay	2–9	1–7	8th	
2011	Austin Peay	3–8	2–6	T–7th	
2012	Austin Peay	2–9	1–7	T–8th	
Austin Peay:		20–46	14–34		
Total:		20–46			

== National Football League coaching career ==
=== Arizona Cardinals ===
Christophel worked with the Arizona Cardinals from 2013 to 2017, serving as the team's tight ends coach under Arians' again. In 2017, he helped develop rookie free agent Ricky Seals-Jones a college wide receiver who he helped convert into a tight end. He briefly retired after that year.

=== Tampa Bay Buccaneers ===
In 2019 Christophel again became a tight ends coach under Bruce Arians, this time with the Tampa Bay Buccaneers. He was a member of the coaching staff when the Buccaneers won Super Bowl LV in February 2021, and as of 2022, he is the team's senior offensive assistant coach.
