= 2009 Jacksonville State Gamecocks football team =

American college football season

2009 Jacksonville State Gamecocks football
- Conference: Ohio Valley Conference

Ranking
- Sports Network: No. 16
- Record: 8–3 (6–1 OVC)
- Head coach: Jack Crowe (10th season)
- Offensive coordinator: Ronnie Letson (6th season)
- Defensive coordinator: Greg Stewart (10th season)
- Home stadium: Paul Snow Stadium

2009 Ohio Valley Conference football standings
	Conf.			Overall
Team	W		L	W		L
No. 16 Jacksonville State	6	–	1	8	–	3
No. 19 Eastern Illinois $^	6	–	2	8	–	4
Tennessee Tech	5	–	3	6	–	5
Eastern Kentucky	5	–	3	5	–	6
UT Martin	4	–	4	5	–	6
Tennessee State	3	–	4	4	–	7
Austin Peay	3	–	5	4	–	7
Murray State	2	–	6	3	–	8
Southeast Missouri State	1	–	7	2	–	9
$ – Conference champion; ^ – FCS playoff participant; Jacksonville State had the best record in conference play, but was not eligible for the FCS playoffs because of APR violations.; Rankings from The Sports Network poll

The 2009 Jacksonville State Gamecocks football team represented Jacksonville State University as a member of the Ohio Valley Conference (OVC) during the 2009 NCAA Division I FCS football season. Led by tenth-year head coach Jack Crowe, the Gamecocks compiled an overall record of 8–3 with a mark of 6–1 in conference, finishing first in the OVC. However, Jacksonville State was ineligible for the conference championship and the NCAA Division I Football Championship playoffs due to Academic Progress Rate (APR) violations. Eastern Illinois won the OVC title and earned the conference's automatic bid to the playoffs. Jacksonville State played home games at Paul Snow Stadium in Jacksonville, Alabama.

== Schedule ==
Date	Time	Opponent	Rank	Site	Result	Attendance
September 5	12:00 p.m.	at No. 15 (FBS) Georgia Tech*	No. 21	Bobby Dodd Stadium; Atlanta, GA	L 17–37	46,131
September 12	5:00 p.m.	at Florida State*	No. 23	Doak Campbell Stadium; Tallahassee, FL	L 9–19	71,420
September 19	6:00 p.m.	at Alabama A&M*	No. 24	Louis Crews Stadium; Huntsville, AL	W 45–13	2,906
September 26	3:00 p.m.	at Nicholls State*	No. 22	John L. Guidry Stadium; Thibodaux, LA	W 60–10	8,213
October 3	1:00 p.m.	UT Martin	No. 20	Paul Snow Stadium; Jacksonville, AL	W 52–7	13,086
October 10	3:00 p.m.	at Murray State	No. 18	Roy Stewart Stadium; Murray, KY	W 41–7	5,027
October 24	1:00 p.m.	No. 25 Eastern Illinois	No. 13	Paul Snow Stadium; Jacksonville, AL	L 20–28	12,380
October 31	6:00 p.m.	at Austin Peay	No. 22	Governors Stadium; Clarksville, TN	W 28–10	4,086
November 7	1:00 p.m.	at Southeast Missouri State	No. 17	Houck Stadium; Cape Girardeau, MO	W 24–3	2,635
November 14	12:00 p.m.	Tennessee Tech	No. 17	Paul Snow Stadium; Jacksonville, AL	W 55–28	11,828
November 21	12:00 p.m.	Eastern Kentucky	No. 17	Paul Snow Stadium; Jacksonville, AL	W 34–26	8,713
*Non-conference game; Rankings from The Sports Network Poll released prior to the game; All times are in Central time
