= 2009 Austin Peay Governors football team =

American college football season

2009 Austin Peay Governors football
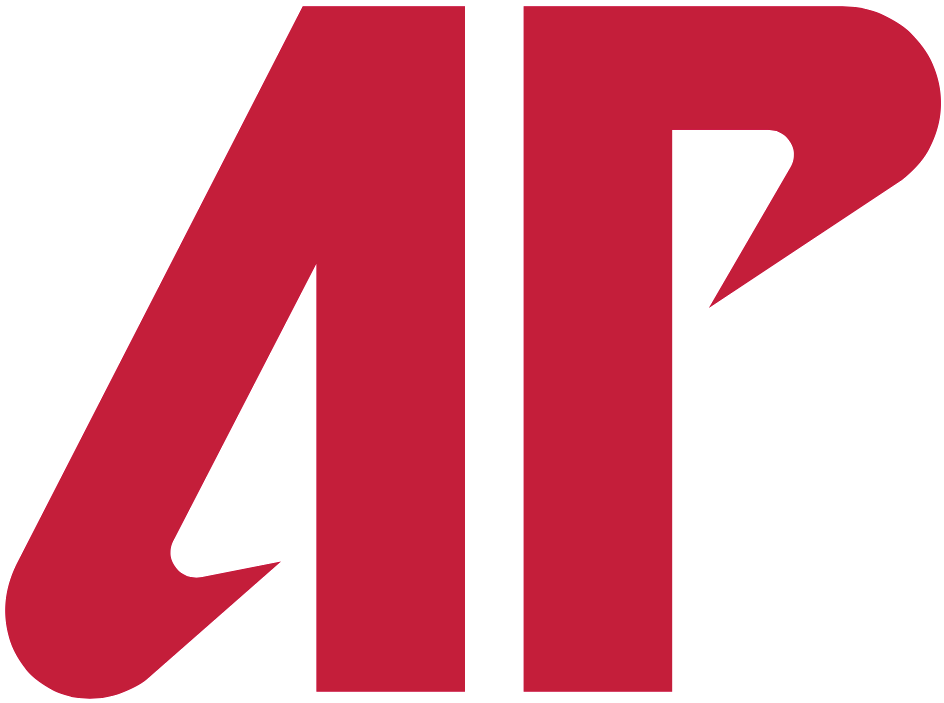
- Conference: Ohio Valley Conference
- Record: 2–9 (1–7 OVC)
- Head coach: Rick Christophel (3rd season)
- Defensive coordinator: Granville Eastman (5th season)
- Home stadium: Governors Stadium

2009 Ohio Valley Conference football standings
	Conf.			Overall
Team	W		L	W		L
No. 16 Jacksonville State	6	–	1	8	–	3
No. 19 Eastern Illinois $^	6	–	2	8	–	4
Tennessee Tech	5	–	3	6	–	5
Eastern Kentucky	5	–	3	5	–	6
UT Martin	4	–	4	5	–	6
Tennessee State	3	–	4	4	–	7
Austin Peay	3	–	5	4	–	7
Murray State	2	–	6	3	–	8
Southeast Missouri State	1	–	7	2	–	9
$ – Conference champion; ^ – FCS playoff participant; Jacksonville State had the best record in conference play, but was not eligible for the FCS playoffs because of APR violations.; Rankings from The Sports Network poll

The 2009 Austin Peay Governors football team represented Austin Peay State University as a member of the Ohio Valley Conference (OVC) during the 2009 NCAA Division I FCS football season. The Governors were led by third-year head coach Rick Christophel and played their home games at Governors Stadium. They finished the season with an overall record of 4–7 and a mark of 3–5 in conference play, placing seventh in the OVC.

== Schedule ==
Date	Time	Opponent	Site	Result	Attendance	Source
September 5	6:00 pm	Newberry*	Governors Stadium; Clarksville, TN	W 34–23	5,800	
September 12	4:00 pm	at Youngstown State*	Stambaugh Stadium; Youngstown, OH	L 21–38	16,389	
September 19	6:30 pm	at Illinois State*	Hancock Stadium; Normal, Illinois	L 7–38	10,158	
September 26	6:00 pm	No. 24 Eastern Illinois	Governors Stadium; Clarksville, TN	L 20–30	4,618	
October 3	7:00 pm	at Tennessee Tech	Tucker Stadium; Cookeville, TN (Sgt. York Trophy)	L 23–31	6,318	
October 10	1:00 pm	at Southeast Missouri State	Houck Stadium; Cape Girardeau, MO	W 24–14	7,543	
October 24	6:00 pm	No. 21 Eastern Kentucky	Governors Stadium; Clarksville, TN	W 24–20	3,118	
October 31	6:00 pm	No. 22 Jacksonville State	Governors Stadium; Clarksville, TN	L 10–28	4,086	
November 7	1:00 pm	at Murray State	Roy Stewart Stadium; Murray, KY	L 17–27	2,964	
November 14	4:00 pm	Tennessee State	Governors Stadium; Clarksville, TN (Sgt. York Trophy)	W 24–21	6,968	
November 21	1:00 pm	UT Martin	Graham Stadium; Martin, TN (Sgt. York Trophy)	L 38–48	4,120	
*Non-conference game; Rankings from The Sports Network Poll released prior to the game; All times are in Central time

== Coaching staff ==
Name	Position	Alma mater	Year
Rick Christophel	Head coach	Austin Peay, 1975	3rd
Steve Haywood	Assistant head coach/offensive line	Austin Peay, 1996	1st as Assistant HC/8th as coach
Granville Eastman	Defensive coordinator/linebackers coach	Saint Mary's, 1992	7th total/5th as defensive coordinator/1st as linebackers coach
Marcus Gildersleeve	Receivers coach/recruiting coordinator	Virginia Tech, 1999	4th
Josh Roberts	Running backs coach	Lambuth, 2006	4th
Dainon Sidney	Defensive backs coach	UAB, 1997	1st
Ryan Taylor	Defensive line coach	Austin Peay, 2004	2nd total/1st as linebackers coach
Craig Candeto	Graduate assistant	Navy, 2004	1st
