= 2009 Southeast Missouri State Redhawks football team =

American college football season

2009 Southeast Missouri State Redhawks football
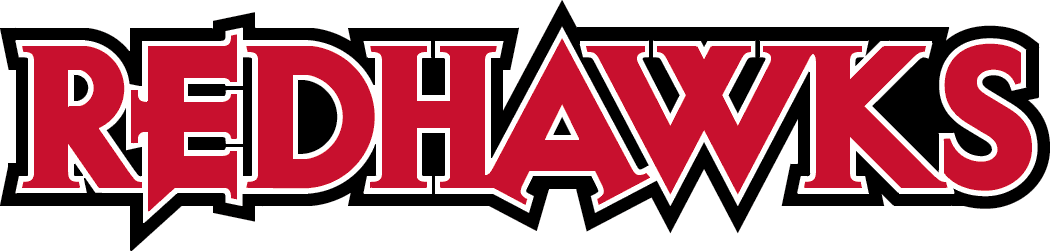
- Conference: Ohio Valley Conference
- Record: 2–9 (1–7 OVC)
- Head coach: Tony Samuel (4th season)
- Offensive coordinator: Vincent White (4th season)
- Offensive scheme: Multiple
- Defensive coordinator: Tim McGuire (4th season)
- Base defense: 4–3
- Home stadium: Houck Stadium

2009 Ohio Valley Conference football standings
	Conf.			Overall
Team	W		L	W		L
No. 16 Jacksonville State	6	–	1	8	–	3
No. 19 Eastern Illinois $^	6	–	2	8	–	4
Tennessee Tech	5	–	3	6	–	5
Eastern Kentucky	5	–	3	5	–	6
UT Martin	4	–	4	5	–	6
Tennessee State	3	–	4	4	–	7
Austin Peay	3	–	5	4	–	7
Murray State	2	–	6	3	–	8
Southeast Missouri State	1	–	7	2	–	9
$ – Conference champion; ^ – FCS playoff participant; Jacksonville State had the best record in conference play, but was not eligible for the FCS playoffs because of APR violations.; Rankings from The Sports Network poll

The 2009 Southeast Missouri State Redhawks football team represented Southeast Missouri State University as a member of the Ohio Valley Conference (OVC) during the 2009 NCAA Division I FCS football season. Led by fourth-year head coach Tony Samuel, the Redhawks compiled an overall record of 2–9 with a mark of 1–7 in conference play, placing last out of nine teams in the OVC. Southeast Missouri State played home games at Houck Stadium in Cape Girardeau, Missouri.

== Schedule ==
Date	Time	Opponent	Site	Result	Attendance	Source
September 3	6:00 p.m.	Quincy*	Houck Stadium; Cape Girardeau, MO	W 72–3	6,105	
September 12	6:30 p.m.	at No. 23 (FBS) Cincinnati*	Nippert Stadium; Cincinnati, OH	L 3–70	30,421	
September 19	6:00 p.m.	Eastern Illinois	Houck Stadium; Cape Girardeau, MO	L 14–23	9,053	
September 26	6:00 p.m.	at UT Martin	Graham Stadium; Martin, TN	L 22–29	4,269	
October 3	6:00 p.m.	at Tennessee State	Nissan Stadium; Nashville, TN	L 17–23	6,314	
October 10	1:00 p.m.	Austin Peay	Houck Stadium; Cape Girardeau, MO	L 14–24	7,543	
October 24	1:30 p.m.	at Tennessee Tech	Tucker Stadium; Cookeville, TN	L 16–28	2,221	
October 31	12:00 p.m.	at Eastern Kentucky	Roy Kidd Stadium; Richmond, KY	L 6–20	3,300	
November 7	1:00 p.m.	No. 15 Jacksonville State	Houck Stadium; Cape Girardeau, MO	L 3–24	2,635	
November 14	1:00 p.m.	Murray State	Houck Stadium; Cape Girardeau, MO	W 49–13	2,147	
November 21	1:00 p.m.	No. 1 Southern Illinois*	Houck Stadium; Cape Girardeau, MO	L 24–42	7,527	
*Non-conference game; Rankings from The Sports Network Poll released prior to the game; All times are in Central time
