= David Howard (defensive tackle) =

American football player (born 1987)

No. 67
- Position: Defensive tackle

Personal information
- Born: August 31, 1987 (age 39); Columbia, Maryland, U.S.
- Listed height: 6 ft 3 in (1.91 m)
- Listed weight: 270 lb (122 kg)

Career information
- College: Brown
- NFL draft: 2010: 7th round, 241st overall pick

Career history
- Tennessee Titans (2010)*; Oakland Raiders (2010)*; Seattle Seahawks (2011)*; Jacksonville Jaguars (2012)*
- * Offseason or practice squad member only

David Thomas Howard (born August 31, 1987) is an American former professional football defensive tackle. After playing college football for Brown Bears, he was selected in the seventh round of the 2010 NFL draft by the Tennessee Titans.

Howard was also a member of the Oakland Raiders, Seattle Seahawks, and Jacksonville Jaguars.

== College career ==
In four seasons at Brown, Howard played in 33 games and totaled 74 tackles, 13 sacks, 15 quarterback pressures, 25.5 tackles for loss and four forced fumbles.

== Professional career ==
=== Tennessee Titans ===
Howard was selected in the seventh round by the Titans with the 241st overall pick in the 2010 NFL draft. He later signed a 4-year contract with the team. He was released September 4, 2010.

=== Oakland Raiders ===
Howard was signed to the Oakland Raiders' practice squad on December 15, 2010, and remained there until the end of the season.

=== Seattle Seahawks ===
On August 20, 2011, Howard signed with the Seattle Seahawks. He was released during final roster cuts on September 3, 2011.

=== Jacksonville Jaguars ===
The Jacksonville Jaguars signed Howard on April 16, 2012. He was waived on April 30, 2012.
