= 2009 Eastern Illinois Panthers football team =

American college football season

2009 Eastern Illinois Panthers football

OVC champion

NCAA Division I First Round, L 7–48 vs. Southern Illinois
- Conference: Ohio Valley Conference

Ranking
- Sports Network: No. 19
- Record: 8–4 (6–2 OVC)
- Head coach: Bob Spoo (22nd season)
- Home stadium: O'Brien Field

2009 Ohio Valley Conference football standings
	Conf.			Overall
Team	W		L	W		L
No. 16 Jacksonville State	6	–	1	8	–	3
No. 19 Eastern Illinois $^	6	–	2	8	–	4
Tennessee Tech	5	–	3	6	–	5
Eastern Kentucky	5	–	3	5	–	6
UT Martin	4	–	4	5	–	6
Tennessee State	3	–	4	4	–	7
Austin Peay	3	–	5	4	–	7
Murray State	2	–	6	3	–	8
Southeast Missouri State	1	–	7	2	–	9
$ – Conference champion; ^ – FCS playoff participant; Jacksonville State had the best record in conference play, but was not eligible for the FCS playoffs because of APR violations.; Rankings from The Sports Network poll

The 2009 Eastern Illinois Panthers football team represented Eastern Illinois University as a member of the Ohio Valley Conference (OVC) during the 2009 NCAA Division I FCS football season. The team was led by 22nd-year head coach Bob Spoo and played their home games at O'Brien Field in Charleston, Illinois. The Panthers finished the season with an 8–4 record overall and a 6–2 record in conference play, making them conference champions. The team received an automatic bid to the NCAA Division I Football Championship playoffs, where they lost to Southern Illinois in the first round. Eastern Illinois was ranked No. 19 in The Sports Network's postseason ranking of NCAA Division I FCS teams.

The team retired former quarterback Tony Romo's jersey number before their October 17 game against Tennessee Tech.

== Schedule ==
Date	Opponent	Rank	Site	Result	Attendance	Source
September 3	Illinois State*		O'Brien Field; Charleston, IL (rivalry)	W 31–6	10,013	
September 12	at Indiana State*		Memorial Stadium; Terre Haute, IN	W 31–0	2,977	
September 19	at Southeast Missouri State		Houck Stadium; Cape Girardeau, MO	W 23–14	9,053	
September 26	at Austin Peay	No. 24	Fortera Stadium; Clarksville, TN	W 30–20	4,618	
October 3	No. 18 Eastern Kentucky	No. 23	O'Brien Field; Charleston, IL	L 31–36	11,271	
October 10	at No. 14 (FBS) Penn State*	No. 25	Beaver Stadium; University Park, PA	L 3–52	104,488	
October 17	Tennessee Tech		O'Brien Field; Charleston, IL	W 23–15	8,708	
October 24	at No. 13 Jacksonville State	No. 25	Paul Snow Stadium; Jacksonville, AL	W 28–20	12,380	
October 31	at Murray State	No. 20	Roy Stewart Stadium; Murray, KY	W 16–10	2,444	
November 14	UT Martin	No. 14	O'Brien Field; Charleston, IL	W 49–13	5,346	
November 19	Tennessee State	No. 14	O'Brien Field; Charleston, IL	L 10–21	3,509	
November 28	at No. 1 Southern Illinois*	No. 19	McAndrew Stadium; Carbondale, IL (NCAA Division I First Round)	L 7–48	6,391	
*Non-conference game; Rankings from The Sports Network Poll released prior to the game
