= 2009 Eastern Kentucky Colonels football team =

American college football season

2009 Eastern Kentucky Colonels football
- Conference: Ohio Valley Conference
- Record: 5–6 (5–3 OVC)
- Head coach: Dean Hood (2nd season)
- Offensive coordinator: Mike Springston (2nd season)
- Home stadium: Roy Kidd Stadium

2009 Ohio Valley Conference football standings
	Conf.			Overall
Team	W		L	W		L
No. 16 Jacksonville State	6	–	1	8	–	3
No. 19 Eastern Illinois $^	6	–	2	8	–	4
Tennessee Tech	5	–	3	6	–	5
Eastern Kentucky	5	–	3	5	–	6
UT Martin	4	–	4	5	–	6
Tennessee State	3	–	4	4	–	7
Austin Peay	3	–	5	4	–	7
Murray State	2	–	6	3	–	8
Southeast Missouri State	1	–	7	2	–	9
$ – Conference champion; ^ – FCS playoff participant; Jacksonville State had the best record in conference play, but was not eligible for the FCS playoffs because of APR violations.; Rankings from The Sports Network poll

The 2009 Eastern Kentucky Colonels football team represented Eastern Kentucky University in the 2009 NCAA Division I FCS football season. The team was led by Dean Hood, the 2008 Ohio Valley Conference (OVC) Roy Kidd Coach of the Year. Hood was in his second season as head coach. The season marked the Colonels' 100th season of play. The Colonels played their home games at Roy Kidd Stadium in Richmond, Kentucky. The team finished the season with a record of 5–6 overall and 5–3 in OVC play.

== Schedule ==
Date	Time	Opponent	Rank	Site	TV	Result	Attendance	Source
September 3	8:00 pm	at Indiana*		Memorial Stadium; Bloomington, IN	BTN	L 13–19	36,759	
September 19	7:00 pm	Tennessee Tech	No. 22	Roy Kidd Stadium; Richmond, KY	OVCsports.tv	W 17–7	10,600	
September 26	8:00 pm	at Murray State	No. 20	Roy Stewart Stadium; Murray, KY	OVCsports.tv	W 23–13	5,966	
October 3	2:30 pm	at No. 22 Eastern Illinois	No. 18	O'Brien Stadium; Charleston, IL	OVCsports.tv	W 36–31	11,271	
October 10	6:00 pm	Tennessee State	No. 16	Roy Kidd Stadium; Richmond, KY	OVCsports.tv	L 17–20	7,100	
October 17	3:00 pm	UT Martin^{†}	No. 24	Roy Kidd Stadium; Richmond, KY		W 31–25	7,400	
October 24	7:00 pm	at Austin Peay	No. 21	Governors Stadium; Clarksville, TN		L 20–24	3,118	
October 31	1:00 pm	Southeast Missouri State		Roy Kidd Stadium; Richmond, KY		W 20–6	3,300	
November 7	1:00 pm	at Kentucky*		Commonwealth Stadium; Lexington, KY	BBSN	L 12–37	67,053	
November 14	1:00 pm	Western Carolina*		Roy Kidd Stadium; Richmond, KY		L 7–24	4,200	
November 21	1:00 pm	at No. 17 Jacksonville State		Paul Snow Stadium; Jacksonville, AL		L 26–34	8,713	
*Non-conference game; ^{†}Homecoming; Rankings from The Sports Network Poll released prior to the game; All times are in Eastern time

== Coaching staff ==
Name	Position	Alma Mater	Year
Dean Hood	Head coach	Ohio Wesleyan, 1986	2nd
Mike Springston	Offensive coordinator/QBs coach	West Virginia Tech, 1981	2nd
Dane Damron	Special teams coordinator/tight ends coach	Georgetown College, 1994	1st
Garry Fisher	Linebackers coach	Bowling Green, 2002	1st
Tony Hatmaker	Defensive backs coach	Union College (KY), 1993	2nd
Ben Hodges	Wide receivers coach	Central College, 2006	4th
Carson Jeffers	Offensive line coach	Concord College, 1997	2nd
Jake Johnson	Defensive line coach	Eastern Kentucky, 2002	6th
John Revere	Running backs coach	Eastern Kentucky, 1976	13th
