= 2009 Tennessee State Tigers football team =

American college football season

2009 Tennessee State Tigers football
- Conference: Ohio Valley Conference
- Record: 4–7 (3–4 OVC)
- Head coach: James Webster (5th season)
- Offensive coordinator: Fred Kaiss (4th season)
- Co-defensive coordinator: Rod Reed (4th as DC; 7th overall season)
- Home stadium: LP Field

2009 Ohio Valley Conference football standings
| | Conf. | | | Overall |
| Team | W | | L | W | | L |
|---|---|---|---|---|---|---|
| No. 16 Jacksonville State | 6 | – | 1 | 8 | – | 3 |
| No. 19 Eastern Illinois $^ | 6 | – | 2 | 8 | – | 4 |
| Tennessee Tech | 5 | – | 3 | 6 | – | 5 |
| Eastern Kentucky | 5 | – | 3 | 5 | – | 6 |
| UT Martin | 4 | – | 4 | 5 | – | 6 |
| Tennessee State | 3 | – | 4 | 4 | – | 7 |
| Austin Peay | 3 | – | 5 | 4 | – | 7 |
| Murray State | 2 | – | 6 | 3 | – | 8 |
| Southeast Missouri State | 1 | – | 7 | 2 | – | 9 |
$ – Conference champion; ^ – FCS playoff participant; Jacksonville State had the best record in conference play, but was not eligible for the FCS playoffs because of APR violations.; Rankings from The Sports Network poll

The 2009 Tennessee State Tigers football team represented Tennessee State University as a member of the a member of the Ohio Valley Conference (OVC) in the 2009 NCAA Division I FCS football season. The Tigers were led by fifth-year head coach James Webster and played their home games at LP Field. They finished the season 4–7 overall and 3–4 in OVC play to finish in sixth place.

== Schedule ==
| Date | Time | Opponent | Site | TV | Result | Attendance | Source |
|---|---|---|---|---|---|---|---|
| September 5 | 6:00 pm | Alabama A&M* | LP Field; Nashville, TN (John Merritt Classic) | | L 7–24 | 23,871 | |
| September 12 | 6:10 pm | vs. Jackson State* | Liberty Bowl Memorial Stadium; Memphis, TN (Southern Heritage Classic) | | W 14–7 | 43,306 | |
| September 19 | 6:00 pm | at Southern* | A. W. Mumford Stadium; Baton Rouge, LA | | L 17–24 | 12,247 | |
| September 26 | 3:45 pm | vs. No. 25 Florida A&M* | Georgia Dome; Atlanta, GA (Atlanta Football Classic) | | L 12–31 | 51,950 | |
| October 3 | 6:00 pm | Southeast Missouri State | LP Field; Nashville, TN | | W 23–17 | 6,314 | |
| October 10 | 6:00 pm | at No. 16 Eastern Kentucky | Roy Kidd Stadium; Richmond, KY | OVCsports.tv | W 20–17 | 7,100 | |
| October 17 | 6:00 pm | Murray State | LP Field; Nashville, TN | | L 6–9 | 5,572 | |
| October 31 | 1:30 pm | at Tennessee Tech | Tucker Stadium; Cookeville, TN (Sgt. York Trophy) | | L 13–20 | 7,999 | |
| November 7 | 5:00 pm | UT Martin | LP Field; Nashville, TN (Sgt. York Trophy) | | L 7–28 | 22,902 | |
| November 14 | 4:00 pm | at Austin Peay | Governors Stadium; Clarksville, TN (Sgt. York Trophy) | | L 21–24 | 6,968 | |
| November 19 | 5:30 pm | at No. 14 Eastern Illinois | O'Brien Stadium; Charleston, IL | | W 21–10 | 3,509 | |
*Non-conference game; Rankings from The Sports Network Poll released prior to the game; All times are in Central time
