= 2009 Utah Utes football team =

American college football season

2009 Utah Utes football

Poinsettia Bowl champion

Poinsettia Bowl, W 37–27 vs. California
- Conference: Mountain West Conference

Ranking
- Coaches: No. 18
- AP: No. 18
- Record: 10–3 (6–2 MW)
- Head coach: Kyle Whittingham (5th season)
- Offensive coordinator: Dave Schramm (1st season)
- Offensive scheme: Spread
- Defensive coordinator: Kalani Sitake (1st season)
- Base defense: 4–3
- Home stadium: Rice-Eccles Stadium

2009 Mountain West Conference football standings
	Conf.			Overall
Team	W		L	W		L
No. 6 TCU $	8	–	0	12	–	1
No. 12 BYU	7	–	1	11	–	2
No. 18 Utah	6	–	2	10	–	3
Air Force	5	–	3	8	–	5
Wyoming	4	–	4	7	–	6
UNLV	3	–	5	5	–	7
San Diego State	2	–	6	4	–	8
New Mexico	1	–	7	1	–	11
Colorado State	0	–	8	3	–	9
$ – Conference champion and BCS representative as top non-AQ school to meet automatic qualification criteria; Rankings from AP Poll

The 2009 Utah Utes football team represented the University of Utah in the 2009 NCAA Division I FBS football season. The team, coached by 5th year head football coach Kyle Whittingham, played its home games in Rice-Eccles Stadium in Salt Lake City, Utah.

The Utes finished the season 10–3, 6–2 in Mountain West play and won the San Diego County Credit Union Poinsettia Bowl 37–27 over California.

== Preseason ==
The Utes were picked to finish third in the Mountain West Conference by media members covering the league. TCU was picked to finish first and BYU was picked second. Utah garnered three first–place votes out twenty-four total ballots. In the preseason AP Poll, Utah was ranked #19, and in the preseason Coaches' Poll they were ranked #18.

=== Coaching changes ===
Shortly after the 2009 Sugar Bowl, Utah lost both coordinators to other programs. Defensive coordinator Gary Andersen accepted a job as head coach of Utah State. Kalani Sitake, who had been the coach of the linebackers, replaced Andersen as defensive coordinator; Sitake continued his duties as linebacker coach. Offensive coordinator Andy Ludwig accepted the same position with Kansas State (and then less than two months later accepted the same position with California. Dave Schramm, the former running back coach, was promoted to offensive coordinator. Aaron Alford, who had been coaching cornerbacks, replaced Schramm as running back coach. J.D. Williams was hired to replace Alford as coach of the cornerbacks. Utah also lost offensive line coach Charlie Dickey to Kansas State. He was replaced by Blake Miller. John Pease was hired to coach the defensive line, a position which previously did not have a position coach. Finally, safeties coach Morgan Scalley took over Schramm's duties as recruiting coordinator.

=== Recruiting ===
College recruiting (2009)
Name	Hometown	School	Height	Weight	40^{‡}	Commit date
James Aiono; DE	West Valley City, UT	Snow College (JC)	6 ft 3 in (1.91 m)	273 lb (124 kg)		
James Aiono; DE	Recruit ratings: Rivals:					
Conroy Black; DB	Miramar, FL	Fullerton (JC)	6 ft 0 in (1.83 m)	176 lb (80 kg)		
Conroy Black; DB	Recruit ratings: Rivals:					
Beau Burton; RB	Scottsdale, AZ	Saguaro	5 ft 9 in (1.75 m)	195 lb (88 kg)		
Beau Burton; RB	Recruit ratings: Rivals:					
Terrance Cain; QB	Houston, TX	Blinn (JC)	5 ft 11 in (1.80 m)	186 lb (84 kg)	4.62	Dec 14, 2008
Terrance Cain; QB	Recruit ratings: Scout: Rivals:					
Eric Dago; DE	Houston, TX	Blinn (JC)	6 ft 2 in (1.88 m)	211 lb (96 kg)		
Eric Dago; DE	Recruit ratings: Rivals:					
LT Filiaga; LB	Provo, UT	Bingham	6 ft 0 in (1.83 m)	230 lb (100 kg)		
LT Filiaga; LB	Recruit ratings: Rivals:					
Colby Goodwin; TE	Houston, TX	CY-Fair	6 ft 5 in (1.96 m)	202 lb (92 kg)		
Colby Goodwin; TE	Recruit ratings: Rivals:					
Latu Heimuli; DL	Salt Lake City, UT	Highland	6 ft 3 in (1.91 m)	296 lb (134 kg)		
Latu Heimuli; DL	Recruit ratings: Rivals:					
Vyncent Jones; OL	Sandy, UT	Jordan	6 ft 3 in (1.91 m)	291 lb (132 kg)		
Vyncent Jones; OL	Recruit ratings: Rivals:					
Maxwell Lacey; DB	Pasadena, CA	Compton (JC)	6 ft 2 in (1.88 m)	193 lb (88 kg)	4.45	Dec 17, 2008
Maxwell Lacey; DB	Recruit ratings: Scout: Rivals:					
Ray Magee; WR	San Diego, CA	Fullerton (JC)	6 ft 4 in (1.93 m)	226 lb (103 kg)		
Ray Magee; WR	Recruit ratings: Rivals:					
Nick Marsh; K	Petaluma, CA	Petaluma	6 ft 0 in (1.83 m)	198 lb (90 kg)		
Nick Marsh; K	Recruit ratings: Rivals:					
Kapua Sai; OL	Kahalu'u, HI	S. Louis	6 ft 5 in (1.96 m)	319 lb (145 kg)		
Kapua Sai; OL	Recruit ratings: Rivals:					
Jamal Smith; WR	Oxnard, CA	Oxnard	6 ft 2 in (1.88 m)	181 lb (82 kg)		
Jamal Smith; WR	Recruit ratings: Rivals:					
Antoine Smithson; WR	Baltimore, MD	East Los Angeles (JC)	5 ft 11 in (1.80 m)	215 lb (98 kg)	4.4	Jan 5, 2009
Antoine Smithson; WR	Recruit ratings: Scout: Rivals:					
Victor Spikes; DB	Beaumont, TX	Beaumont Central	6 ft 0 in (1.83 m)	200 lb (91 kg)		
Victor Spikes; DB	Recruit ratings: Rivals:					
Jarrad Stewart; DB	Houston, TX	Pearland	5 ft 9 in (1.75 m)	182 lb (83 kg)		
Jarrad Stewart; DB	Recruit ratings: Rivals:					
Percy Taumoelau; OL	Glendale, UT	Cottonwood	6 ft 4 in (1.93 m)	313 lb (142 kg)		
Percy Taumoelau; OL	Recruit ratings: Rivals:					
Jeremiah Tofaeono; DT	Las Vegas, NV	Cheyenne	6 ft 3 in (1.91 m)	311 lb (141 kg)		
Jeremiah Tofaeono; DT	Recruit ratings: Rivals:					
Siosaia Tuipulotu; DT	Euless, TX	Trinity	6 ft 1 in (1.85 m)	280 lb (130 kg)		
Siosaia Tuipulotu; DT	Recruit ratings: Rivals:					
Chris Washington; DB	Layton, UT	Northridge	6 ft 0 in (1.83 m)	183 lb (83 kg)		
Chris Washington; DB	Recruit ratings: Rivals:					
Jason Wittingham; LB	Provo, UT	Timpview	6 ft 2 in (1.88 m)	214 lb (97 kg)		
Jason Wittingham; LB	Recruit ratings: Rivals:					
Jordan Wynn; QB	Oceanside, CA	Oceanside	6 ft 1 in (1.85 m)	175 lb (79 kg)		
Jordan Wynn; QB	Recruit ratings: Rivals:					
Kamaron Yancy; DB	Los Angeles, CA	Pierce (JC)	5 ft 9 in (1.75 m)	187 lb (85 kg)	4.49	Dec 15, 2008
Kamaron Yancy; DB	Recruit ratings: Scout: Rivals:					
Overall recruit ranking: Scout: 65 Rivals: 60
‡ Refers to 40-yard dash; Note: In many cases, Scout, Rivals, 247Sports, On3, and ESPN may conflict in their listings of height, weight and 40 time.; In these cases, the average was taken. ESPN grades are on a 100-point scale.; Sources: "Utah Commit List 2009". Rivals.; "2009 Team Ranking". Rivals.com.

== Schedule ==
Date	Time	Opponent	Rank	Site	TV	Result	Attendance
September 3	7:00 pm	Utah State*	No. 19	Rice-Eccles Stadium; Salt Lake City, UT (Battle of the Brothers)	The mtn.	W 35–24	45,333
September 12	8:30 pm	at San Jose State*	No. 17	Spartan Stadium; San José, CA	ESPNU	W 24–14	23,684
September 19	1:30 pm	at Oregon*	No. 18	Autzen Stadium; Eugene, OR	ESPN	L 24–31	58,017
September 26	5:30 pm	Louisville*^{†}		Rice-Eccles Stadium; Salt Lake City, UT	CBSCS	W 30–14	45,588
October 10	4:00 pm	at Colorado State		Hughes Stadium; Fort Collins, CO	The mtn.	W 24–17	30,499
October 17	8:00 pm	at UNLV	No. 24	Sam Boyd Stadium; Las Vegas, NV	The mtn.	W 35–15	26,315
October 24	2:00 pm	Air Force	No. 19	Rice-Eccles Stadium; Salt Lake City, UT	Versus	W 23–16 ^{OT}	45,129
October 31	6:00 pm	Wyoming	No. 19	Rice-Eccles Stadium; Salt Lake City, UT	The mtn.	W 22–10	44,837
November 7	4:00 pm	New Mexico	No. 17	Rice-Eccles Stadium; Salt Lake City, UT	The mtn.	W 45–14	45,051
November 14	5:30 pm	at No. 4 TCU	No. 16	Amon G. Carter Stadium; Fort Worth, TX (College GameDay)	CBSCS	L 28–55	50,307
November 21	2:00 pm	San Diego State	No. 23	Rice-Eccles Stadium; Salt Lake City, UT	Versus	W 38–7	44,991
November 28	3:00 pm	at No. 18 BYU	No. 22	LaVell Edwards Stadium; Provo, UT (Holy War)	CBSCS/The mtn.	L 23–26 ^{OT}	64,301
December 23	6:00 pm	vs. California*	No. 23	Qualcomm Stadium; San Diego, CA (Poinsettia Bowl)	ESPN	W 37–27	32,665
*Non-conference game; ^{†}Homecoming; Rankings from AP Poll released prior to the game; All times are in Mountain time

== Rankings ==
Ranking movements Legend: ██ Increase in ranking ██ Decrease in ranking — = Not ranked
	Week															
Poll	Pre	1	2	3	4	5	6	7	8	9	10	11	12	13	14	Final
AP	19	17	18	—	—	—	24	19	19	17	16	23	22	—	23	18
Coaches	18	17	16	—	—	—	—	20	19	16	14	23	19	25	24	18
Harris	Not released				—	—	—	19	19	16	16	21	19	24	22	Not released
BCS	Not released							18	16	14	16	21	21	25	23	Not released

== Game summaries ==
=== Utah State ===
	1	2	3	4	Total
Aggies	10	7	0	0	17
#19 Utes	14	12	7	2	35

Utah Leads Series: 77 – 28 – 4
The Utes won their home opener, beating rival Utah State for the 12th consecutive time, extending their winning streak to a best-in-the-nation 15 games including games from the 2008 and 2007 seasons. This was the first game for former Utah defensive coordinator, and new Utah State head coach, Gary Andersen. Junior college transfer Terrance Cain won in his debut at quarterback for the Utes, completing 20 of 30 attempts for 286 yards, two touchdowns, and one interception, while running back Matt Asiata ran for a career-best 156 yards and two touchdowns and David Reed caught 10 passes for 172 yards. Utah State managed to force three turnovers, and running back Robert Turbin set a school record with a 96-yard touchdown run that accounted for nearly a third of the Aggies' offensive total for the game.

=== San Jose State ===
	1	2	3	4	Total
#17 Utes	7	0	0	17	24
Spartans	0	7	0	7	14

Utah Leads Series: 5 – 1 – 0

The Utah Utes extended their winning streak to sixteen games—the longest winning streak in the nation—with their 24–14 victory over the Spartans. Utah missed three field goals and lost two fumbles, which kept the game close despite outgaining San Jose State 499 yards to 264 yards. Receiver John Peel had Utah's first fumble and running back Matt Asiata had the second. The two teams entered the fourth quarter tied at 7–7. Utah took the lead when quarterback Terrance Cain completed a 51-yard pass to Jereme Brooks to take a 14–7 lead. On the Utes' next drive, it took a 21–7 lead after running back Eddie Wide had consecutive 15-yard runs. San Jose State responded with a touchdown drive on their next possession. Utah's backup place kicker, Joe Phillips, capped a 56-yard drive with a successful field goal for the final score of the game.

=== Oregon ===
	1	2	3	4	Total
#18 Utes	7	0	17	0	24
Ducks	14	7	7	3	31

Oregon Leads Series: 18 – 8 – 0
Oregon beat Utah at Autzen Stadium and snapped Utah's sixteen-game winning streak. The game improved Oregon's record to 2–1 (0–0 Pac-10) and dropped Utah's record to 2–1 (0–0 MWC). Both teams struggled with turnovers—Utah had two and Oregon had four for the game.

Utah trailed by 18 points midway through the third quarter, but managed to cut the deficit to 4 points with two consecutive touchdowns. The first came when quarterback Terrance Cain completed 22-yard pass to receiver Jereme Brooks. The next touchdown came less than a minute later when safety Robert Johnson picked up an Oregon fumble and returned it 28-yards for a touchdown. That would be the last score for the Utes. Oregon added a final field goal for the final 31–24 score when place kicker Morgan Flint connected on a 31 yard attempt.

=== Louisville ===
	1	2	3	4	Total
Cardinals	0	0	7	7	14
Utes	14	6	0	10	30

Utah Leads Series: 4 – 0 – 0
The Utes were able to return to their winning ways with their victory over Louisville, but they lost starting senior running back Matt Asiata for the season when he tore the ACL on his right knee during a 24-yard touchdown run with 6:04 remaining in the first quarter. Entering the game, Asiata had been the season-leader in the Mountain West Conference for rushing yards.

Running back Eddie Wide made the most of his opportunity and had a career-high 129 yards rushing in the game. Overall Utah outgained Louisville on the ground 214 yards to 80 yards. The Utes also were able to force Louisville to make three turnovers while only having one turnover themselves.

The win improved Utah's record to 3–1 (0–0 MWC) while dropping Louisville to 1–2 (0–0 Big East). The win was the fortieth career win for Utah's coach Kyle Whittingham. He is the fifth Utah coach to have forty victories with the Utes. He joins Ike Armstrong, Jack Curtice, Ray Nagel, and Ron McBride.

After the season ended, the NCAA granted Asiata a one-year extension of eligibility. Because of his injuries, he was granted a "medical hardship" or a medical redshirt.

=== Colorado State ===
	1	2	3	4	Total
Utes	3	0	7	14	24
Rams	0	3	14	0	17

Utah Leads Series: 54 – 22 – 2
Safety Robert Johnson intercepted three passes from Colorado State quarterback Grant Stucker and helped the Utes secure a victory in Utah's Mountain West Conference (MWC) season opener. The victory improved Utah's record to 4–1 (1–0 MWC) and dropped Colorado State's record to 3–3 (0–2 MWC). Colorado State took a 17–3 lead with 4:53 remaining in the third quarter with a seven-play, 79–yard drive when Grant Zucker completed a 36-yard pass to Dion Morton for a touchdown. Utah responded 36 seconds later with a two-play, 57-yard drive when Terrance Cain completed 47-yard pass to David Reed to make the score 17–10.

Robert Johnson made his first interception on Colorado State's next possession. Utah took advantage of the turnover with a seventeen play, 73–yard touchdown drive when running back Eddie Wide scored on a 1-yard run. The Utes converted on third down four times during the drive. With the score tied, Colorado State was driving and had moved the ball to the 50-yard line when Johnson made his second interception. Utah again took advantage of the turnover and scored a touchdown off an 8-yard reception by Eddie Wide. Johnson ended a third consecutive Colorado State drive with his third interception and ensured the victory for Utah. Following the game, the MWC named Robert Johnson its defensive player of the week.

=== UNLV ===
	1	2	3	4	Total
#24 Utes	7	21	0	7	35
Rebels	3	3	9	0	15

Utah Leads Series: 13 – 2 – 0
Utah capitalized on two UNLV turnovers in the first half and jumped to a 28–6 halftime lead on the way to a 35–15 victory at Sam Boyd Stadium in Las Vegas, Nevada. The win improved Utah's record to 5–1 (2–0 MWC) and dropped UNLV's record to 2–5 (0–3 MWC). The first UNLV turnover occurred during the second quarter when Robert Johnson intercepted a pass from Omar Clayton and returned it to the UNLV 8–yard line. Two plays later, Utah scored on a touchdown run by quarterback Terrance Cain. On UNLV's next drive, Robert Johnson scored again when his teammate Christian Cox intercepted a pass and then fumbled the ball into Johnson's hands who returned the ball 64 yards for a touchdown.

UNLV narrowed Utah's lead to 14 points by scoring 9 points during the third quarter. UNLV scored a touchdown on a 20-yard pass from backup quarterback Mike Clausen to Phillip Payne, but the Rebels failed on a two-point conversion attempt. The Rebels next drive was capped by a 37-yard field goal by Kyle Watson. Utah would score the final points in the game during the fourth quarter when Eddie Wide scored a touchdown on a 37-yards run.

=== Air Force ===
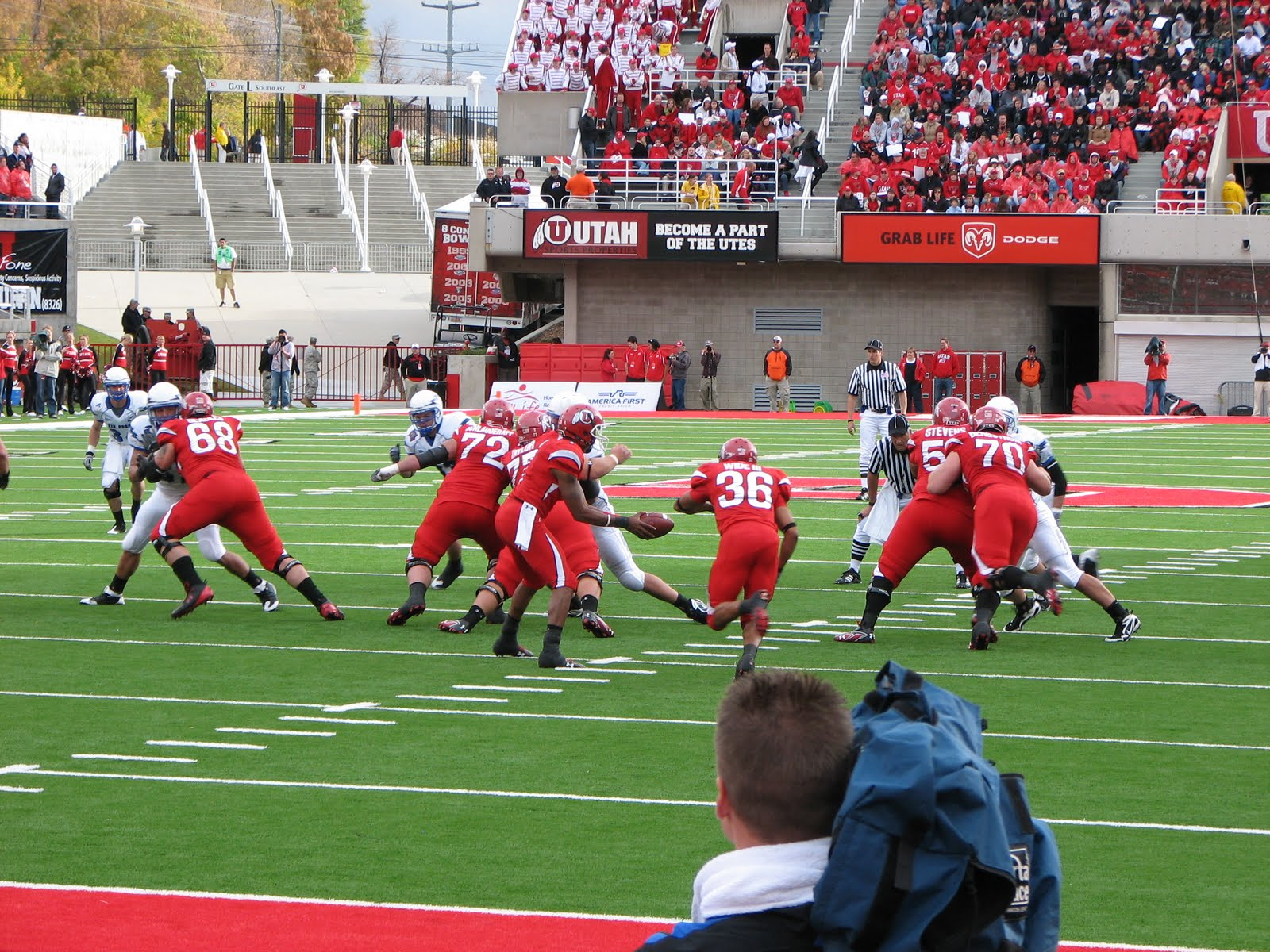
Quarterback Terrance Cain hands the ball to running back Eddie Wide

	1	2	3	4	OT	Total
Falcons	10	0	3	3	0	16
#19 Utes	6	0	10	0	7	23

Air Force Leads Series: 14 – 12 – 0
Utah defeated Air Force in overtime despite gaining fewer yards and having two turnovers to Air Force's one. Air Force also had the ball on offense for over 38 minutes while Utah only had the ball for 21 minutes. The win improved Utah's record to 6–1 (3–0 MWC) and dropped Air Force's record to 4–4 (3–2 MWC).

Running back Eddie Wide scored two of Utah's touchdowns. The first touchdown came during the first quarter after he recovered a Terrance Cain fumble and advanced the ball 44 yards. His second touchdown game during overtime on a 1-yard run. He finished the game with 121 yards rushing. Utah's other touchdown came on a 90-yard pass from Cain to David Reed.

After the game, punter Ryan Sellwood was named the Mountain West Conference Special Teams Player of the Week. He averaged 48.1 yards on his eight punts. He also placed three punts inside the twenty-yard line, including one on the 3-yard line with 3:44 left in regulation and another at the 7-yard line with :20 left in regulation.

=== Wyoming ===
	1	2	3	4	Total
Cowboys	3	7	0	0	10
#19 Utes	0	3	6	13	22

Utah Leads Series: 50 – 31 – 1
Wyoming led most of the game, but Utah managed to outscore the Cowboys in the fourth quarter and get the win. The game dropped Wyoming's record to 4–4 (2–2 MWC) and improved Utah's record to 7–1 (4–0 MWC).

Wyoming took a 10–3 lead with 4:56 to play in the second quarter when quarterback Austyn Carta-Samuels scored on a 30-yard pass-and-catch play from backup quarterback Robert Benjamin. That would remain the score going into halftime. Coach Kyle Whittingham decided the team needed a "spark" so when the Ute offense took the field during the second half, freshman backup Jordan Wynn replaced Terrance Cain as quarterback. The move seemed to work as Utah scored two field goals on its first two possessions of the second half to cut Wyoming's lead to 10–9. Utah had its first lead of the game at the 7:35 mark in the fourth quarter when Wynn completed a 22-yard pass to receiver Jereme Brooks. Utah scored its final touchdown after Wyoming failed to convert on fourth down and turned the ball over on its own 9-yard line. Two plays later, Eddie Wide scored a touchdown on a 5-yard run.

After the game, the Mountain West Conference honored two Utah players as players of the week: Eddie Wide as Offensive Player of the Week and Defensive End Koa Misi as Defensive Player of the Week. Wide rushed for a career-high 135 yards and also had a touchdown. He averaged 5.6 yards per carry and had his fifth consecutive game with 100 or more yards. Misi led the Utes with eight tackles (seven solo). He had two sacks in the second half, during which the Utes prevented the Cowboys from scoring and held them to 74 yards of offense.

=== New Mexico ===
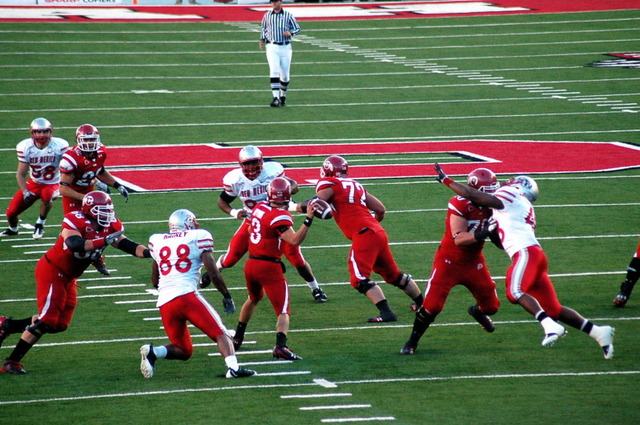
Quarterback Jordan Wynn gets set to throw. The play resulted in a 69-yard touchdown reception by receiver Jereme Brooks.

	1	2	3	4	Total
Lobos	7	0	0	7	14
# 17 Utes	7	10	21	7	45

Utah Leads Series: 32 – 17 – 2
Utah put up over 550 yards of offense in the first start by quarterback Jordan Wynn. Wynn was a true freshman and became the third true freshman quarterback to start for Utah since 1972 when the NCAA reinstated eligibility for freshman. He passed for 297 yards and two touchdowns, but had one interception. The win improved Utah's record to 8–1 (5–0 MWC) and dropped New Mexico to 0–9 (0–5 MWC).

Eddie Wide rushed for 145 yards, a new personal best, in his sixth consecutive 100-yard rushing game, which is a new Utah record. Sausan Shakerin also added 100 yards rushing. Receiver Jereme Brooks had six catches for 135 yards and a touchdown.

=== TCU ===
	1	2	3	4	Total
#16 Utes	7	7	7	7	28
#4 Horned Frogs	14	24	3	14	55

Utah Leads Series: 5 – 2 – 0

I have been a head coach for five years, and that is the best team I've faced.

— Kyle Whittingham

ESPN held its two-hour College GameDay show from outside TCU's Amon G. Carter Stadium to promote the day's college games—including the TCU–Utah game. The program aired live starting at 8:00 a.m. MT.

With the 55–28 win over the Utes, the Horned Frogs took sole position of first place in the Mountain West Conference, improved their record to 10–0 (6–0 MWC), and dropped Utah to 8–2 (5–1 MWC). The Utah defense struggled against TCU and allowed them to amass 549 yards of total offense and 32 first downs.

Utah fell behind for good late in the first quarter. After Utah tied the game at 7–7, TCU scored 28 straight points to take a 35–7 lead with 11:40 remaining in the second quarter. TCU took advantage of Utah mistakes during their scoring run. TCU took a 14–7 lead and then on the ensuing Utah possession, Greg Burks for TCU blocked Sean Sellwood's punt. Six plays later, TCU took a 21–7 lead. TCU also intercepted quarterback Jordan Wynn and returned the ball 15 yards for a touchdown. The rest of the game, the teams traded scores with Utah scoring 21 more points and TCU scoring 20.

After the game, the MWC named TCU sophomore linebacker Tank Carder as its Defensive Player of the Week. Carder had nine tackles during the game, including one for a loss, and an interception that he returned for a touchdown.

=== San Diego State ===
	1	2	3	4	Total
Aztecs	0	0	0	7	7
#23 Utes	14	24	0	0	38

Utah Leads Series: 16 – 12 – 1
The Utes scored a touchdown on four of their first five possessions on their way to a 38–0 halftime lead. Utah did not score the rest of the game, but still had a 31 point victory over the Aztecs, who got on the board late in the 4th quarter. The victory improved Utah's record to 9–2 (6–1 MWC) and dropped San Diego State to 4–7 (2–5 MWC).

Receiver Jereme Brooks had seven catches for 100 yards and a touchdown, and David Reed added six catches for 89 yards. Running back Eddie Wide led the Utes in rushing with sixteen carries for 84 yards and two touchdowns. Safety Joe Dale also had a touchdown when he intercepted Aztec quarterback Ryan Lindley's pass and returned it 30 yards to the end zone.

The MWC named Dale its Defensive Player of the Week. In addition to his defensive touchdown, he also recorded five tackles, including one for a loss, and a pass breakup. Three of his tackles were solo tackles.

=== BYU ===
	1	2	3	4	OT	Total
#22 Utes	6	0	0	14	3	23
#18 Cougars	0	7	13	0	6	26

Utah Leads Series: 53 – 34 – 4
In the second overtime game in series history, BYU defeated Utah 26–23. The game improved BYU's record to 10–2 (7–1 MWC) and dropped Utah's record to 9–3 (6–2 MWC). The game was the final regular season game for both teams. BYU finished second in the MWC and Utah finished third.

BYU held a 20–6 lead entering the fourth quarter. Utah scored 14 fourth quarter points to force overtime, but their comeback fell short. After Utah managed a field goal in overtime to take a 23–20 lead, BYU was given possession of the ball. BYU took advantage, and quarterback Max Hall connected to tight end Andrew George for a 25-yard touchdown reception and the victory.

Utah scored five field goals during the game, which proved costly as they were unable to score more points from their forays into scoring position. Kicker Joe Phillips made all five of his field goal attempts.

After the game, BYU quarterback Max Hall criticized Utah and its fans. He said, "I don't like Utah. In fact, I hate them. I hate everything about them. I hate their program, their fans. I hate everything. It felt really good to send those guys home." When asked for a clarification and if he really hated Utah, he continued, "I think the whole university and their fans and the organization is [sic] classless. They threw beer on my family and stuff last year and did a whole bunch of nasty things. I don't respect them and they deserved to lose." During the game, Hall had 12 completions out of 32 pass attempts for 134 yards. He had two touchdown passes and no interceptions.

The MWC named Joe Phillips its Special Teams Player of the Week. His five field goals were 39, 21, 31, 40 and 29 yards long, respectively. His 40-yard kick came with 29 seconds left in the fourth quarter and sent the game into overtime.

=== Poinsettia Bowl: Utah vs. California ===
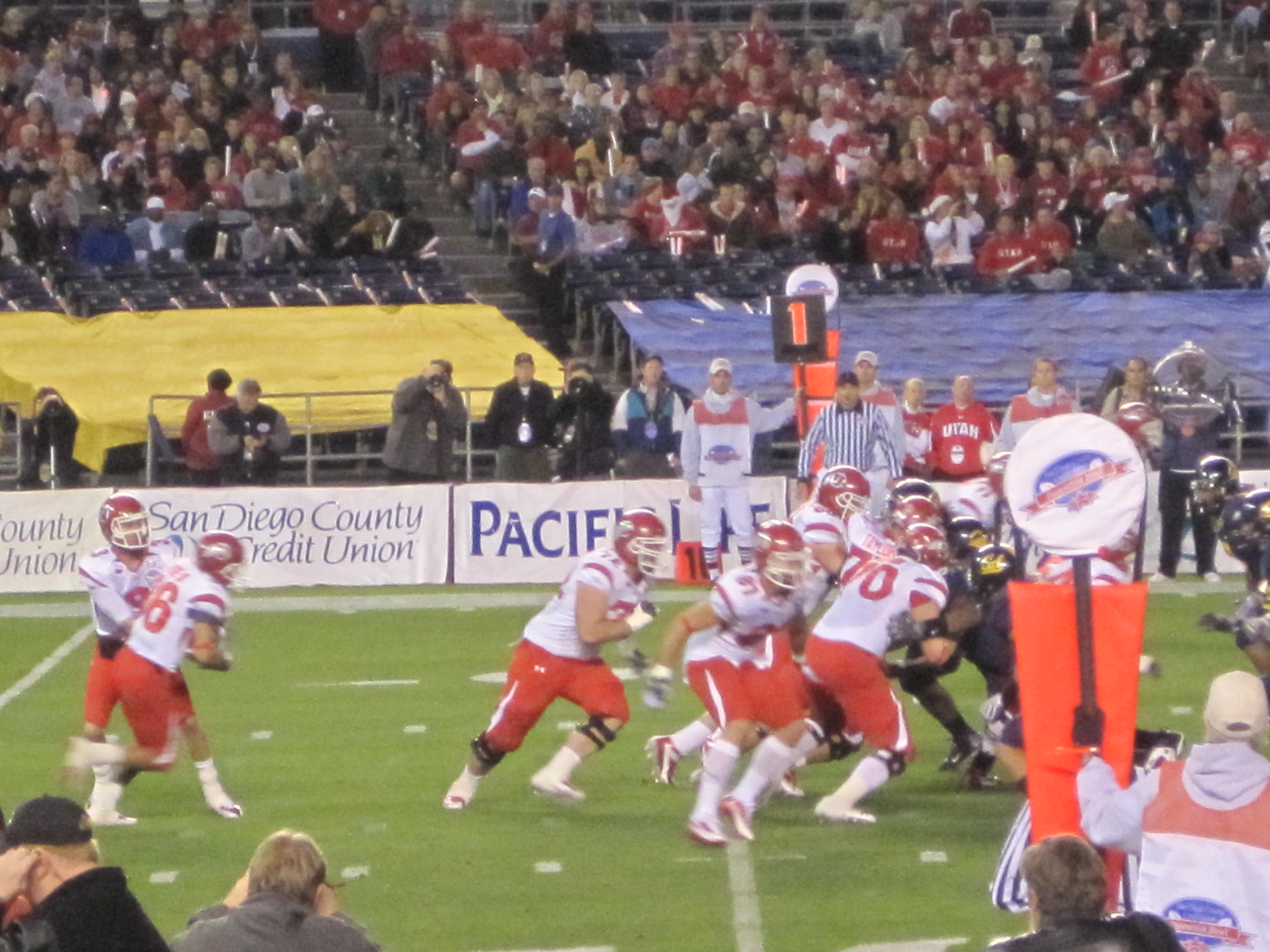
Eddie Wide takes a handoff from Jordan Wynn

	1	2	3	4	Total
#23 Utes	7	17	3	10	37
Golden Bears	14	0	7	6	27

Cal Leads Series: 4 – 3 – 0
Utah defeated California 37–27 in the Poinsettia Bowl for their ninth consecutive bowl victory. The win improved Utah's record to 10–3 (6–2 MWC) and dropped California to 8–5 (5–3 Pac-10). Utah has the longest bowl winning streak in the country and is tied for the second longest streak of all time. Florida State holds the record with eleven consecutive bowl victories from 1985 to 1996. The win improved Utah's bowl record to 12–3 (.800).

California built a 14–0 lead about midway through the first quarter, but Utah was able to recover with 27 straight points. Running back Shane Vereen scored the first touchdown of the game off of a 36-yard rush. The next play from scrimmage, Eddie Young intercepted a Jordan Wynn pass and returned it for a touchdown. Utah responded with an eight-play, 30-yard touchdown drive when Wynn completed a 6-yard pass to tight end Kendrick Moeai. The drive got started when Shaky Smithson returned the kickoff 61 yards to the 30-yard line. Utah scored 17 points in the second quarter to take a 24–14 halftime lead.

The second half started as a defensive struggle until Utah sacked Kevin Riley and Riley fumbled the ball on the California 14-yard line. California held Utah to a field goal attempt; Joe Phillips connected on the 29-yard field goal. California responded on the next possession with a six-play, 77-yard touchdown drive. Vereen scored his second touchdown of the night on a 1-yard run.

Utah scored its final points on the night when linebacker Stevenson Sylvester returned an interception 27-yards for a touchdown. The pass had been tipped by Sylvester's teammate, safety Robert Johnson. The Bears scored one more touchdown, but failed to score the two-point conversion for the final 37–27 score.

Wynn was named the Offensive MVP for the game. He completed 26 of his 36 pass attempts for 338 yards. He had three touchdown passes, but also one interception. Sylvester was named the Defensive MVP. In addition to his defensive touchdown, Sylvester finished with eight tackles, five of which were solo tackles. He also assisted in a tackle for a loss and had a pass breakup. With a 39-yard catch in the fourth quarter, receiver David Reed broke school records for catches in a season (81) and receiving yards in a season (1,188). Reed had six catches for 103 yards during the Poinsettia Bowl.

== Roster ==
Roster

Defensive backs

- 2 Chappuis, Quade – Fr.
- 5 Black, Conroy – Jr.
- 6 Yancy, Kamaron – Jr.
- 8 Liefting, Nick – So.
- 12 Dale, Joe – Sr.
- 14 Stewart, Jarrad – Fr.
- 15 Whittingham, Tyler – So.
- 17 Johnson, Robert – Sr.
- 19 Bennion, Bryce – Fr.
- 21 Chapman, Lamar – Jr.
- 23 Maires, Chase – Fr.
- 24 Jones, Justin – Sr.
- 25 Stanford, R.J. – Sr.
- 26 Lacy, Ryan – Fr.
- 27 Burton, Brandon – So.
- 28 Topps, Reggie – Fr.
- 31 Spikes, Victor – Fr.
- 33 Taplin-Ross, Justin – Jr.
- 34 Clements, Tysen – Jr.
- 35 Bird, Greg – So.
- 37 Washington, Chris – Fr.
- 39 Dart, Grayson – Fr.
- 46 Tenifa, Lolo – Fr.

Defensive end

- 41 Misi, Koa – Sr.
- 42 Fotu, Nai – Jr.
- 49 Reilly, Trevor – Fr.
- 53 Dago, Eric – Fr.
- 66 Clifford, Tage – So.
- 90 Shelby, Derrick – So.
- 96 Tui'one, Junior – Jr.
- 97 Binks, Nick – Fr.

Defensive tackle

- 43 Talamaivao, Lei – So.
- 44 Kruger, Dave – Fr.
- 47 Drecksel, Tatum – Sr.
- 58 Tuipulotu, LT – Fr.
- 63 Pela, Joape – So.
- 69 Fangupo, Tame – Fr.
- 75 Nau, Viliamu – Sr.
- 92 Eliapo, Kenape – Sr.
- 94 Cox, Christian – Jr.
- 95 Heimuli, Latu – Fr.
- 98 Siliga, Sealver – So.

Kickers/Punters

- 30 Vroman, Ben – Sr.
- 39 Phillips, Joe – Jr.
- 86 Sellwood, Sean – Fr.
- Marsh, Nick – Fr.

Linebackers

- 10 Sylvester, Stevenson – Sr.
- 13 Williams, J.J. – So.
- 18 Manis, Chad – Jr.
- 20 Wright, Mike – Sr.
- 32 Walker, Chaz – So.
- 40 Filiaga, LT – Fr.
- 45 Andersen, Boo – Fr.
- 50 Neal, Mo – So.
- 51 King, Jamel – So.
- 52 Martinez, Matt – So.
- 56 Leon, Vincent– Fr.
- 59 Gaison, Kepa – Sr.
- 93 Salanoa, Thor – Fr.

Long snapper

- 62 Greene, Patrick – Fr.

Offensive line

- 54 Stevens, Tevita – Fr.
- 55 A'asa, Neli – Jr.
- 56 Sai, Kapua – Fr.
- 57 Williams, Tyler – Sr.
- 60 Vincent, Kawika – Jr.
- 61 Friel, Kala – Fr.
- 64 Jones, Vyncent – Fr.
- 67 Tuimauga, Derek – Fr.
- 68 Beadles, Zane – Sr.
- 70 Bergstrom, Tony – So.
- 71 Watts, Walter – Jr.
- 72 Schlauderaff, Caleb – Jr.
- 73 Bukarau, Daniel – Jr.
- 74 Brenner, Sam – Fr.
- 77 Taylor, Zane – Jr.
- 79 Taumoelau, Percy – Fr.
- 91 Tofaeono, Jeremiah – Fr.

Quarterbacks

- 3 Wynn, Jordan – Fr.
- 7 Cain, Terrance – Jr.
- 10 May, Rocky – Fr.
- 12 Robles, Griff – Fr.

Running backs

- 2 Stowers, Ray – Sr.
- 4 Asiata, Matt – Sr.
- 22 Shakerin, Sausan – Fr.
- 29 Robinson, Mychal – So.
- 36 Wide, Eddie – Jr.
- 38 Burton, Beau – Fr.
- 46 Moss, Trevor – Sr.
- 48 Fonua, Junior – Sr.

Tight ends

- 80 Joppru, Chris – Sr.
- 81 Moeai, Kendrick – Fr.
- 83 Hendy, Ben – Sr.
- 84 Clifford, Brad – So.
- 89 Goodwin, Colby – Fr.

Wide receivers

- 1 Smithson, Shaky – Jr.
- 8 Wesson, Elijah – Sr.
- 9 Key, Aiona – Sr.
- 11 Matthews, Luke – Fr.
- 15 Christopher, DeVonte – Fr.
- 16 Reed, David – Sr.
- 20 Wade, Zach – So.
- 23 Nakamura, Chase – Fr.
- 24 McNabb, Griffin – Fr.
- 34 Moala, Fatu – Fr.
- 37 Chandler, Kevin – Fr.
- 42 Orchard, Jacob – Fr.
- 82 Peel, John – Sr.
- 85 Brooks, Jereme – Jr.
- 87 Fitzgerald, Sean – Fr.
- 88 Smith, Jamal – Fr.

== After the season ==
=== Awards ===
Six Utah players were named to the 2009 MWC Football All-Conference Team first team: wide receiver David Reed, running back Eddie Wide, offensive lineman Zane Beadles, defensive lineman Koa Misi, linebacker Stevenson Sylvester, and defensive back Robert Johnson.

Two players were named to the second team: Caleb Schlauderaff and Zane Taylor, both on the offensive line. Four players were given Honorable Mention: placekicker Joe Phillips, punter Sean Sellwood, defensive lineman Sealver Siliga, and linebacker Mike Wright.

Beadles was named to several All-American teams recognized by the NCAA to determine "consensus All-Americans". The Football Writers Association of America named him to its first team All-American team. The Walter Camp Football Foundation named him to its second team. Sporting News named him to its third team.

=== NFL draft ===
Utah had six players taken in the 2010 NFL draft – setting a school record. The players taken were:

Player	Position	Round	Pick	NFL club
Koa Misi	Defensive end	2	40	Miami Dolphins
Zane Beadles	Offensive tackle	2	45	Denver Broncos
Robert Johnson	Safety	5	148	Tennessee Titans
David Reed	Wide receiver	5	156	Baltimore Ravens
Stevenson Sylvester	Linebacker	5	166	Pittsburgh Steelers
R.J. Stanford	Cornerback	7	223	Carolina Panthers
