= 2009 Mountain West Conference football season =

- League: NCAA Division I FBS (Football Bowl Subdivision)
- Sport: Football
- Duration: September 3, 2009 through January 7, 2010
- Teams: 9
- TV partner(s): Mtn., CBS College Sports, Versus

2010 NFL Draft
- Top draft pick: DE Jerry Hughes, TCU
- Picked by: Indianapolis Colts, 31st overall

Regular Season
- Champion: TCU
- Runners-Up: Brigham Young

Football seasons
- 2008 2010

2009 Mountain West Conference football standings
	Conf.			Overall
Team	W		L	W		L
No. 6 TCU $	8	–	0	12	–	1
No. 12 BYU	7	–	1	11	–	2
No. 18 Utah	6	–	2	10	–	3
Air Force	5	–	3	8	–	5
Wyoming	4	–	4	7	–	6
UNLV	3	–	5	5	–	7
San Diego State	2	–	6	4	–	8
New Mexico	1	–	7	1	–	11
Colorado State	0	–	8	3	–	9
$ – Conference champion and BCS representative as top non-AQ school to meet automatic qualification criteria; Rankings from AP Poll

The 2009 Mountain West Conference football season was the 11th since eight former members of the Western Athletic Conference banded together to form the MW.

== Rankings ==
		Pre	Wk 1	Wk 2	Wk 3	Wk 4	Wk 5	Wk 6	Wk 7	Wk 8	Wk 9	Wk 10	Wk 11	Wk 12	Wk 13	Wk 14	Final
Air Force	AP		(42T)	NR													
Air Force	C																
Air Force	Harris	Not released															
Air Force	BCS	Not released															
BYU	AP	20	9	7	19	20	18	18	16	(26)	25	22	19	18	16	15	
BYU	C	24	12	9	20	21T	20	19	16	(27)	25	22	18	15	13	14	
BYU	Harris	Not released				19	17	17	16	(26)	25	22	18	15	13	14	
BYU	BCS	Not released							16	NR		22	22	19	14	14	
Colorado State	AP		(42T)	(41)	(37T)	NR											
Colorado State	C		(47T)	(40T)	(40)	NR											
Colorado State	Harris	Not released															
Colorado State	BCS	Not released															
New Mexico	AP																
New Mexico	C																
New Mexico	Harris	Not released															
New Mexico	BCS	Not released															
San Diego State	AP																
San Diego State	C																
San Diego State	Harris	Not released															
San Diego State	BCS	Not released															
TCU	AP	17	16	15	15	11	10	12	10	8	6	4	4	4	4	3	
TCU	C	17	16	15	14	10	9	8	7	6	4	4	4	4	4	3	
TCU	Harris	Not released				11	10	10	8	7	6	4	4	4	4	3	
TCU	BCS	Not released							8	6	6	4	4	4	4	4	
UNLV	AP																
UNLV	C																
UNLV	Harris	Not released															
UNLV	BCS	Not released															
Utah	AP	19	17	18	(35)	(31)	(30)	24	19	19	17	16	23	22	(26)	23	
Utah	C	18	17	16	(28)	(31)	(32)	(29)	20	19	16	14	23	19	25	24	
Utah	Harris	Not released				(31)	(32)	(26)	19	19	16	16	21	19	24	22	
Utah	BCS	Not released							18	16	14	16	21	21	25	23	
Wyoming	AP																
Wyoming	C																
Wyoming	Harris	Not released															
Wyoming	BCS	Not released															

== Mountain West vs. BCS matchups ==
Date	Visitor	Home	Significance
September 5	San Diego State 14	UCLA 33	
September 5	BYU 14	Oklahoma 13	BYU upset the third-ranked Oklahoma Sooners in their first game of the season. Game played at Cowboys Stadium.
September 5	New Mexico 6	Texas A&M 41	
September 6	Colorado State 23	Colorado 17	Rocky Mountain Showdown
September 12	Texas 41	Wyoming 10	
September 12	TCU 30	Virginia 14	The Horned Frogs opened the season by holding the Cavaliers to 177 yards total offense. UVa never started a play inside the red zone (the TCU 20), and did not score until the final 5 minutes, with the game out of reach.
September 12	Air Force 13	Minnesota 20	The first game at the Gophers' new TCF Bank Stadium.
September 12	Oregon State 23	UNLV 21	
September 19	Utah 24	Oregon 31	
September 19	Wyoming 0	Colorado 24	
September 19	Florida State 54	BYU 28	
September 26	Louisville 14	Utah 30	
September 26	TCU 14	Clemson 10	
October 3	New Mexico 28	Texas Tech 48	

== Bowl games ==
Bowl Game	Date	Stadium	City	Television	Conference Matchups	Payout (US$)
Maaco Bowl Las Vegas	December 22	Sam Boyd Stadium	Las Vegas, Nevada	ESPN	#1 MW vs. #4/#5 Pac-10	
Poinsettia Bowl	December 23	Qualcomm Stadium	San Diego, California	ESPN	#2 MW vs. #6 Pac-10 / WAC	
Armed Forces Bowl	December 31	Amon G. Carter Stadium	Fort Worth, Texas	ESPN	#3 MW vs. Pac-10	
New Mexico Bowl	December 19	University Stadium	Albuquerque, New Mexico	ESPN	#4 MW vs. WAC	
Humanitarian Bowl	December 30	Bronco Stadium	Boise, Idaho	ESPN	#5 MW vs. #1 WAC	

== Home attendance ==
Team	Game 1	Game 2	Game 3	Game 4	Game 5	Game 6	Game 7	Total	Average
BYU	64,209	64,091	64,103	64,641	64,071	64,301	--------	385,416	64,236
Utah	45,333	45,588	45,129	44,837	45,051	44,991	--------	270,929	45,155
TCU	35,249	37,130	31,156	33,541	50,307	41,738	--------	229,121	38,187
Air Force	42,205	35,929	30,104	34,117	46,212	25,370	--------	214,117	35,686
New Mexico	30,051	26,246	35,248	24,021	24,344	21,751	--------	161,661	27,982
San Diego State	42,137	21,184	30,258	12,647	21,708	18,851	--------	146,785	24,464
Colorado State	23,417	24,967	30,499	20,631	22,025	20,317	--------	141,586	23,643
UNLV	22,195	25,967	29,717	25,597	26,315	15,902	13,730	159,423	22,775
Wyoming	18,016	31,017	19,196	14,502	19,201	15,031	--------	116,963	19,494

== Awards and honors ==
=== All Conference teams ===
- Offensive Player of the Year: Andy Dalton, JR., QB, TCU
- Defensive Player of the Year: Jerry Hughes, SR., DE, TCU
- Special Teams Player of the Year: Jeremy Kerley, JR., KR, TCU
- Freshman of the Year: Austyn Carta-Samuels, QB, Wyoming
- Coach of the Year: Gary Patterson, TCU

Offense:

Pos.	Name	Yr.	School	Name	Yr.	School
First Team				Second Team		
QB	Andy Dalton	JR.	TCU	Max Hall	SR.	BYU
WR	Ryan Wolfe	SR.	UNLV	Vincent Brown	JR.	San Diego State
WR	David Reed	SR.	Utah	DeMarco Sampson	SR.	San Diego State
RB	Harvey Unga	JR.	BYU	Jared Tew	JR.	Air Force
RB	Eddie Wide	JR.	Utah	Joseph Turner	SR.	TCU
TE	Dennis Pitta	SR.	BYU	Andrew George	SR.	BYU
OL	Matt Reynolds	SO.	BYU	Nick Charles	SR.	Air Force
OL	Erik Cook	SR.	New Mexico	Peter Lusk	SR.	Air Force
OL	Marshall Newhouse	SR.	TCU	Caleb Schlauderaff	JR.	Utah
OL	Marcus Cannon	JR.	TCU	Zane Taylor	JR.	Utah
OL	Zane Beadles	SR.	Utah	Jake Kirkpatrick	JR.	TCU
PK	Ross Evans	SO.	TCU	Erik Soderberg	SO.	Air Force
PR/KR	Jeremy Kerley	JR.	TCU	Dion Morton	SR.	Colorado State

Defense:

Pos.	Name	Yr.	School	Name	Yr.	School
First Team				Second Team		
DL	Jan Jorgensen	SR.	BYU	Ben Garland	SR.	Air Force
DL	Jerry Hughes	SR.	TCU	Johnathan Rainey	SO.	New Mexico
DL	Koa Misi	SR.	Utah	Wayne Daniels	JR.	TCU
DL	John Fletcher	SR.	Wyoming	Cory Grant	JR.	TCU
LB	Carmen Messina	SO.	New Mexico	Mychal Sisson	SO.	Colorado State
LB	Daryl Washington	SR.	TCU	Tank Carder	SO.	TCU
LB	Stevenson Sylvester	SR.	Utah	Brian Hendricks	SO.	Wyoming
DB	Reggie Rembert	JR.	Air Force	Andrew Wright	SO.	Air Force
DB	Rafael Priest	SR.	TCU	Andrew Rich	JR.	BYU
DB	Nick Sanders	SR.	TCU	Tejay Johnson	JR.	TCU
DB	Robert Johnson	SR.	Utah	Chris Prosinski	JR.	Wyoming
P	Adam Miller	SR.	New Mexico	Brian Stahovich	SO.	San Diego State
