= Carta-Samuels =

Carta-Samuels is a surname. Notable people with the surname include:

- Austyn Carta-Samuels (born 1991), American football player
- K. J. Carta-Samuels (born 1995), American football player
