= 2009 TCU Horned Frogs football team =

American college football season

2009 TCU Horned Frogs football

Mountain West champion

Fiesta Bowl, L 10–17 vs. Boise State
- Conference: Mountain West Conference

Ranking
- Coaches: No. 6
- AP: No. 6
- Record: 12–1 (8–0 MW)
- Head coach: Gary Patterson (9th season)
- Co-offensive coordinators: Jarrett Anderson (1st season); Justin Fuente (1st season)
- Offensive scheme: Spread
- Defensive coordinator: Dick Bumpas (6th season)
- Base defense: 4–2–5
- Home stadium: Amon G. Carter Stadium

Uniform

2009 Mountain West Conference football standings
	Conf.			Overall
Team	W		L	W		L
No. 6 TCU $	8	–	0	12	–	1
No. 12 BYU	7	–	1	11	–	2
No. 18 Utah	6	–	2	10	–	3
Air Force	5	–	3	8	–	5
Wyoming	4	–	4	7	–	6
UNLV	3	–	5	5	–	7
San Diego State	2	–	6	4	–	8
New Mexico	1	–	7	1	–	11
Colorado State	0	–	8	3	–	9
$ – Conference champion and BCS representative as top non-AQ school to meet automatic qualification criteria; Rankings from AP Poll

The 2009 TCU Horned Frogs football team represented Texas Christian University in the 2009 NCAA Division I FBS football season. The team was coached by Gary Patterson. The Frogs played their home games at Amon G. Carter Stadium, which is located on campus in Fort Worth. The Horned Frogs finished the season 12–1 (8–0 MWC) and won the Mountain West Conference title. On December 6, they were invited to their first Bowl Championship Series game and their first major bowl since the 1959 Cotton Bowl Classic, against #6 Boise State in the Tostitos Fiesta Bowl on January 4, 2010. In the Fiesta Bowl, TCU was upset by underdog Boise State, 17–10.

== Schedule ==
Date	Time	Opponent	Rank	Site	TV	Result	Attendance
September 12	2:30 p.m.	at Virginia*	No. 16	Scott Stadium; Charlottesville, VA	ESPNU	W 30–14	48,336
September 19	6:00 p.m.	Texas State*	No. 15	Amon G. Carter Stadium; Fort Worth, TX		W 56–21	35,249
September 26	3:30 p.m.	at Clemson*	No. 15	Memorial Stadium; Clemson, SC	ESPN360	W 14–10	71,869
October 3	7:00 p.m.	SMU*	No. 11	Amon G. Carter Stadium; Fort Worth, TX (Battle for the Iron Skillet)	The Mtn.	W 39–14	37,130
October 10	6:30 p.m.	at Air Force	No. 10	Falcon Stadium; Colorado Springs, CO	CBSCS	W 20–17	30,104
October 17	3:00 p.m.	Colorado State	No. 12	Amon G. Carter Stadium; Fort Worth, TX	Versus	W 44–6	31,156
October 24	6:30 p.m.	at No. 16 BYU	No. 10	LaVell Edwards Stadium; Provo, UT (College GameDay)	Versus	W 38–7	64,641
October 31	3:00 p.m.	UNLV^{†}	No. 8	Amon G. Carter Stadium; Fort Worth, TX	Versus	W 41–0	33,541
November 7	3:00 p.m.	at San Diego State	No. 6	Qualcomm Stadium; San Diego, CA	Versus	W 55–12	21,708
November 14	6:30 p.m.	No. 16 Utah	No. 4	Amon G. Carter Stadium; Fort Worth, TX (College GameDay)	CBSCS	W 55–28	50,307
November 21	1:00 p.m.	at Wyoming	No. 4	War Memorial Stadium; Laramie, WY	The Mtn.	W 45–10	15,031
November 28	12:00 p.m.	New Mexico	No. 4	Amon G. Carter Stadium; Fort Worth, TX	The Mtn.	W 51–10	41,738
January 4, 2010	7:30 p.m.	vs. No. 6 Boise State*	No. 3	University of Phoenix Stadium; Glendale, AZ (Fiesta Bowl)	Fox	L 10–17	73,227
*Non-conference game; ^{†}Homecoming; Rankings from AP Poll released prior to the game; All times are in Central time

== Roster ==
2009 TCU Horned Frogs football team roster
Players			Coaches
Offense: Pos. / # / Name / Class; QB / 14 / Andy Dalton / Jr	Defense: Pos. / # / Name / Class	Special teams: Pos. / # / Name / Class	Head coach: Gary Patterson; Coordinators/assistant coaches Legend: (C) Team captain; (S) Suspended; (I) Ineligible; Injured; Redshirt

== Rankings ==
Ranking movements Legend: ██ Increase in ranking ██ Decrease in ranking
	Week															
Poll	Pre	1	2	3	4	5	6	7	8	9	10	11	12	13	14	Final
AP	17	16	15	15	11	10	12	10	8	6	4	4	4	4	3	6
Coaches	17	16	15	14	10	9	8	7	6	4	4	4	4	4	3	6
Harris	Not released				11	10	10	8	7	6	4	4	4	4	3	Not released
BCS	Not released							8	6	6	4	4	4	4	4	Not released
