= 2009 Air Force Falcons football team =

American college football season

2009 Air Force Falcons football

Armed Forces Bowl champion

Armed Forces Bowl, W 47–20 vs. Houston
- Conference: Mountain West Conference
- Record: 8–5 (5–3 MW)
- Head coach: Troy Calhoun (3rd season)
- Offensive coordinator: Clay Hendrix (2nd season)
- Co-offensive coordinators: Blane Morgan (2nd season); Mike Thiessen (1st season)
- Offensive scheme: Triple option
- Defensive coordinator: Tim DeRuyter (3rd season)
- Co-defensive coordinators: Matt Wallerstedt (1st season); Charlton Warren (1st season)
- Base defense: Multiple
- Captain: Game captains
- Home stadium: Falcon Stadium

2009 Mountain West Conference football standings
	Conf.			Overall
Team	W		L	W		L
No. 6 TCU $	8	–	0	12	–	1
No. 12 BYU	7	–	1	11	–	2
No. 18 Utah	6	–	2	10	–	3
Air Force	5	–	3	8	–	5
Wyoming	4	–	4	7	–	6
UNLV	3	–	5	5	–	7
San Diego State	2	–	6	4	–	8
New Mexico	1	–	7	1	–	11
Colorado State	0	–	8	3	–	9
$ – Conference champion and BCS representative as top non-AQ school to meet automatic qualification criteria; Rankings from AP Poll

The 2009 Air Force Falcons football team represented the United States Air Force Academy as a member of the Mountain West Conference (MW) during the 2009 NCAA Division I FBS football season. Led by third-year head coach Troy Calhoun, the Falcons compiled an overall record of 8–5 with a mark of 5–3 in conference play, placing fourth in the MW. Air Force was invited to the Armed Forces Bowl, where the Falcons defeated Houston. The team played home games at Falcon Stadium in Colorado Springs, Colorado

== Schedule ==
Date	Time	Opponent	Site	TV	Result	Attendance	Source
September 5	12:00 p.m.	Nicholls State*	Falcon Stadium; Colorado Springs, CO		W 72–0	42,205	
September 12	5:00 p.m.	at Minnesota*	TCF Bank Stadium; Minneapolis, MN	BTN	L 13–20	50,805	
September 19	5:30 p.m.	at New Mexico	University Stadium; Albuquerque, NM	CBSCS	W 37–13	26,246	
September 26	12:00 p.m.	San Diego State	Falcon Stadium; Colorado Springs, CO	Mtn.	W 26–14	35,929	
October 3	1:30 p.m.	at Navy*	Navy–Marine Corps Memorial Stadium; Annapolis, MD (Commander-in-Chief's Trophy)	CBSCS	L 13–16 ^{OT}	37,820	
October 10	5:30 p.m.	No. 10 TCU	Falcon Stadium; Colorado Springs, CO	CBSCS	L 17–20	30,104	
October 17	12:00 p.m.	Wyoming	Falcon Stadium; Colorado Springs, CO	Mtn.	W 10–0	34,117	
October 24	2:00 p.m.	at No. 19 Utah	Rice–Eccles Stadium; Salt Lake City, UT	Versus	L 16–23 ^{OT}	45,129	
October 31	2:00 p.m.	at Colorado State	Hughes Stadium; Fort Collins, CO (rivalry)	Mtn.	W 34–16	22,025	
November 7	1:30 p.m.	Army*	Falcon Stadium; Colorado Springs, CO (Commander-in-Chief's Trophy, College GameDay)	CBSCS	W 35–7	46,212	
November 14	4:00 p.m.	UNLV	Falcon Stadium; Colorado Springs, CO	Mtn.	W 45–17	25,370	
November 21	1:30 p.m.	at No. 19 BYU	LaVell Edwards Stadium; Provo, UT	CBSCS	L 21–38	64,071	
December 31	10:00 a.m.	vs. Houston*	Amon G. Carter Stadium; Fort Worth, TX (Armed Forces Bowl)	ESPN	W 47–20	41,414	
*Non-conference game; Rankings from AP Poll released prior to the game; All times are in Mountain time

== Roster ==
- QB Tim Jefferson, So.
