= 2009 Colorado State Rams football team =

American college football season

2009 Colorado State Rams football
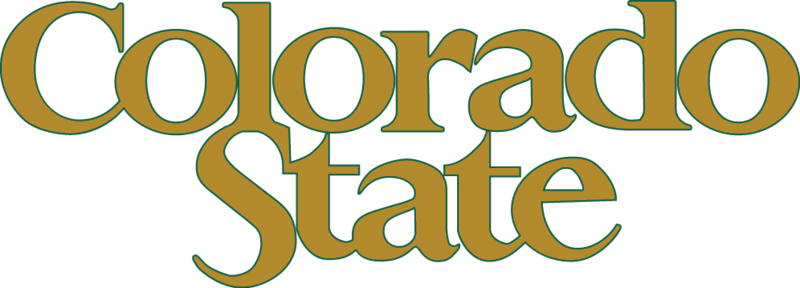
- Conference: Mountain West Conference
- Record: 3–9 (0–8 MW)
- Head coach: Steve Fairchild (2nd season)
- Offensive coordinator: Greg Peterson (2nd season)
- Defensive coordinator: Larry Kerr (12th season)
- Home stadium: Sonny Lubick Field at Hughes Stadium

2009 Mountain West Conference football standings
| | Conf. | | | Overall |
| Team | W | | L | W | | L |
|---|---|---|---|---|---|---|
| No. 6 TCU $ | 8 | – | 0 | 12 | – | 1 |
| No. 12 BYU | 7 | – | 1 | 11 | – | 2 |
| No. 18 Utah | 6 | – | 2 | 10 | – | 3 |
| Air Force | 5 | – | 3 | 8 | – | 5 |
| Wyoming | 4 | – | 4 | 7 | – | 6 |
| UNLV | 3 | – | 5 | 5 | – | 7 |
| San Diego State | 2 | – | 6 | 4 | – | 8 |
| New Mexico | 1 | – | 7 | 1 | – | 11 |
| Colorado State | 0 | – | 8 | 3 | – | 9 |
$ – Conference champion and BCS representative as top non-AQ school to meet automatic qualification criteria; Rankings from AP Poll

The 2009 Colorado State Rams football team represented Colorado State University as member of the Mountain West Conference in the 2009 NCAA Division I FBS football season. They played their home games at Sonny Lubick Field at Hughes Stadium in Fort Collins, Colorado and were led by second-year coach Steve Fairchild. The Rams finished the season 3–9 overall and 0–8 in Mountain West play place last out of nine teams.

== Schedule ==
| Date | Time | Opponent | Site | TV | Result | Attendance |
|---|---|---|---|---|---|---|
| September 6 | 5:00 p.m. | at Colorado* | Folsom Field; Boulder, CO (Rocky Mountain Showdown) | FSN | W 23–17 | 53,168 |
| September 12 | 3:00 p.m. | Weber State* | Hughes Stadium; Fort Collins, CO | | W 24–23 | 23,417 |
| September 19 | 3:00 p.m. | Nevada* | Hughes Stadium; Fort Collins, CO | | W 35–20 | 24,967 |
| September 26 | 4:00 p.m. | at No. 19 BYU | LaVell Edwards Stadium; Provo, UT | The Mtn. | L 23–42 | 64,091 |
| October 3 | 8:30 p.m. | at Idaho* | Kibbie Dome; Moscow, ID | Altitude2/ESPNU | L 29–31 | 16,000 |
| October 10 | 4:00 p.m. | Utah^{†} | Hughes Stadium; Fort Collins, CO | The Mtn. | L 17–24 | 30,499 |
| October 17 | 2:00 p.m. | at No. 12 TCU | Amon G. Carter Stadium; Fort Worth, TX | Versus | L 6–44 | 31,156 |
| October 24 | 2:00 p.m. | San Diego State | Hughes Stadium; Fort Collins, CO | The Mtn. | L 28–42 | 20,631 |
| October 31 | 2:00 p.m. | Air Force | Hughes Stadium; Fort Collins, CO | The Mtn. | L 16–34 | 22,025 |
| November 7 | 8:00 p.m. | at UNLV | Sam Boyd Stadium; Whitney, NV | The Mtn. | L 16–35 | 15,902 |
| November 21 | 4:00 p.m. | at New Mexico | University Stadium; Albuquerque, NM | The Mtn. | L 27–29 | 21,751 |
| November 27 | 12:00 p.m. | Wyoming | Hughes Stadium; Fort Collins, CO (The Border War) | The Mtn. | L 16–17 | 20,317 |
*Non-conference game; ^{†}Homecoming; Rankings from AP Poll released prior to the game; All times are in Mountain time
