= 2009 BYU Cougars football team =

American college football season

2009 BYU Cougars football

Maaco Bowl Las Vegas champion

Maaco Bowl Las Vegas, W 44–20 vs. Oregon State
- Conference: Mountain West Conference

Ranking
- Coaches: No. 12
- AP: No. 12
- Record: 11–2 (7–1 MW)
- Head coach: Bronco Mendenhall (5th season)
- Offensive coordinator: Robert Anae (5th season)
- Offensive scheme: Air raid
- Defensive coordinator: Jaime Hill (2nd season)
- Base defense: 3–4
- Captains: Matt Bauman; Max Hall; Scott Johnson; Jan Jorgensen; Dennis Pitta
- Home stadium: LaVell Edwards Stadium

Uniform

2009 Mountain West Conference football standings
| | Conf. | | | Overall |
| Team | W | | L | W | | L |
|---|---|---|---|---|---|---|
| No. 6 TCU $ | 8 | – | 0 | 12 | – | 1 |
| No. 12 BYU | 7 | – | 1 | 11 | – | 2 |
| No. 18 Utah | 6 | – | 2 | 10 | – | 3 |
| Air Force | 5 | – | 3 | 8 | – | 5 |
| Wyoming | 4 | – | 4 | 7 | – | 6 |
| UNLV | 3 | – | 5 | 5 | – | 7 |
| San Diego State | 2 | – | 6 | 4 | – | 8 |
| New Mexico | 1 | – | 7 | 1 | – | 11 |
| Colorado State | 0 | – | 8 | 3 | – | 9 |
$ – Conference champion and BCS representative as top non-AQ school to meet automatic qualification criteria; Rankings from AP Poll

The 2009 BYU Cougars football team represented Brigham Young University in the 2009 NCAA Division I FBS football season. The Cougars were led by head coach Bronco Mendenhall and played their home games at LaVell Edwards Stadium.

The Cougars finished the season with a record of 11–2, 7–1 in Mountain West play and won the Maaco Bowl Las Vegas 44–20 over Oregon State.

== Schedule ==
| Date | Time | Opponent | Rank | Site | TV | Result | Attendance |
|---|---|---|---|---|---|---|---|
| September 5 | 6:00 pm | vs. No. 3 Oklahoma* | No. 20 | Cowboys Stadium; Arlington, TX (Cowboys Classic) | ESPN | W 14–13 | 75,437 |
| September 12 | 2:30 pm | at Tulane* | No. 9 | Louisiana Superdome; New Orleans, LA | ESPN2 | W 54–3 | 26,224 |
| September 19 | 5:00 pm | Florida State* | No. 7 | LaVell Edwards Stadium; Provo, UT | Versus | L 28–54 | 64,209 |
| September 26 | 4:00 pm | Colorado State | No. 19 | LaVell Edwards Stadium; Provo, UT | mtn. | W 42–23 | 64,091 |
| October 2 | 7:00 pm | Utah State* | No. 20 | LaVell Edwards Stadium; Provo, UT (Old Wagon Wheel) | mtn. | W 35–17 | 64,103 |
| October 10 | 7:00 pm | at UNLV | No. 18 | Sam Boyd Stadium; Las Vegas, NV | mtn. | W 59–21 | 25,597 |
| October 17 | 3:00 pm | at San Diego State | No. 18 | Qualcomm Stadium; San Diego, CA | mtn. | W 38–28 | 30,258 |
| October 24 | 5:30 pm | No. 10 TCU^{†} | No. 16 | LaVell Edwards Stadium; Provo, UT (College GameDay) | Versus | L 7–38 | 64,641 |
| November 7 | 12:00 pm | at Wyoming | No. 25 | War Memorial Stadium; Laramie, WY | mtn. | W 52–0 | 19,201 |
| November 14 | 12:00 pm | at New Mexico | No. 22 | University Stadium; Albuquerque, NM | mtn. | W 24–19 | 24,344 |
| November 21 | 1:30 pm | Air Force | No. 19 | LaVell Edwards Stadium; Provo, UT | CBS CS | W 38–21 | 64,071 |
| November 28 | 3:00 pm | No. 22 Utah | No. 18 | LaVell Edwards Stadium; Provo, UT (Holy War) | mtn./CBSCS | W 26–23 ^{OT} | 64,301 |
| December 22 | 5:00 pm | vs. No. 16 Oregon State* | No. 15 | Sam Boyd Stadium; Whitney, NV (Maaco Bowl Las Vegas) | ESPN | W 44–20 | 40,018 |
*Non-conference game; ^{†}Homecoming; Rankings from AP Poll released prior to the game; All times are in local to gamesite time

== Rankings ==
Ranking movements Legend: ██ Increase in ranking ██ Decrease in ranking — = Not ranked RV = Received votes
| | Week | | | | | | | | | | | | | | | |
| Poll | Pre | 1 | 2 | 3 | 4 | 5 | 6 | 7 | 8 | 9 | 10 | 11 | 12 | 13 | 14 | Final |
|---|---|---|---|---|---|---|---|---|---|---|---|---|---|---|---|---|
| AP | 20 | 9 | 7 | 19 | 20 | 18 | 18 | 16 | RV | 25 | 22 | 19 | 18 | 16 | 15 | 12 |
| Coaches Poll | 24 | 12 | 9 | 20 | 21 | 20 | 19 | 16 | RV | 25 | 22 | 18 | 15 | 13 | 14 | 12 |
| Harris | Not released | | | | 19 | 17 | 17 | 16 | RV | 25 | 22 | 18 | 15 | 13 | 14 | Not released |
| BCS | Not released | | | | | | | 16 | — | — | 22 | 22 | 19 | 14 | 14 | Not released |

== Game summaries ==
=== Oklahoma ===
BYU would enter the 2009 Cowboy Classic with a 14-22 record against the Big XII. However BYU was 1-0 against the Sooners. The only previously meeting was the 1994 Copper Bowl, where BYU won 31-6.

2009 Cowboys Classic: #20 BYU vs. #3 Oklahoma

| Team | 1 | 2 | 3 | 4 | Total |
|---|---|---|---|---|---|
| • Cougars | 0 | 7 | 0 | 7 | 14 |
| Sooners | 7 | 3 | 0 | 3 | 13 |

- Date: September 5
- Location: Cowboys Stadium, Arlington, TX
- Game start: 5:06 pm MST
- Elapsed time: 3:16
- Game attendance: 75,437
- Game weather: 72 °F (22 °C), Indoors
- Referee: Scott Novak
- TV announcers (ESPN): Brad Nessler, Todd Blackledge, & Heather Cox

Scoring summary
| 1 | 4:56 | OU | Ryan Broyles 8-yard pass from Sam Bradford (Jimmy Stevens kick) | OU 7-0 |
| 2 | 1:25 | BYU | Andrew George 5-yard pass from Max Hall (Mitch Payne kick) | Tied 7-7 |
| 2 | 0:02 | OU | Jimmy Stevens 35-yard field goal | OU 10-7 |
| 4 | 11:47 | OU | Jimmy Stevens 22-yard field goal | OU 13-7 |
| 4 | 3:03 | BYU | McKay Jacobson 7-yard pass from Max Hall (Mitch Payne kick) | BYU 14-13 |

=== Tulane ===
BYU headed back down South for their second game of the season. The Green Wave would be their featured opponent. BYU and Tulane came into the contest with a 1-1 record against each other. The last meeting between the two was back in 2001, when BYU defeated the Green Wave 70-35 in Provo.

#9 BYU at Tulane

| Team | 1 | 2 | 3 | 4 | Total |
|---|---|---|---|---|---|
| • Cougars | 3 | 17 | 14 | 20 | 54 |
| Green Wave | 0 | 3 | 0 | 0 | 3 |

- Date: September 12
- Location: Louisiana Superdome, New Orleans, LA
- Game start: 1:36 pm MST
- Elapsed time: 3:00
- Game attendance: 26,224
- Game weather: 64 °F (18 °C), Indoors
- Referee: Land Clark
- TV announcers (ESPN2): Terry Gannon & David Norrie

Scoring summary
| 1 | 6:23 | BYU | Mitch Payne 31-yard field goal | BYU 3-0 |
| 2 | 14:15 | BYU | Mitch Payne 20-yard field goal | BYU 6-0 |
| 2 | 6:03 | Tulane | Ross Thevenot 29-yard field goal | BYU 6-3 |
| 2 | 3:28 | BYU | Bryan Kariya 1-yard touchdown run up the middle (Mitch Payne kick) | BYU 13-3 |
| 2 | 0:25 | BYU | Bryan Kariya 12-yard pass from Max Hall (Mitch Payne kick) | BYU 20-3 |
| 3 | 6:24 | BYU | JJ Di Luigi 3-yard touchdown run over the left side (Mitch Payne kick) | BYU 27-3 |
| 3 | 3:02 | BYU | McKay Jacobson 38-yard pass from Max Hall (Mitch Payne kick) | BYU 34-3 |
| 4 | 13:07 | BYU | JJ Di Luigi 1-yard touchdown run up the middle (Mitch Payne kick no good) | BYU 40-3 |
| 4 | 11:47 | BYU | Jordan Pendleton 12-yard fumble return (Mitch Payne kick) | BYU 47-3 |
| 4 | 8:15 | BYU | Riley Nelson 1-yard QB draw (Mitch Payne kick) | BYU 54-3 |

=== Florida State ===
Florida State at #7 BYU

| Team | 1 | 2 | 3 | 4 | Total |
|---|---|---|---|---|---|
| • Seminoles | 7 | 23 | 14 | 10 | 54 |
| Cougars | 0 | 14 | 7 | 7 | 28 |

- Date: September 19
- Location: LaVell Edwards Stadium, Provo, UT
- Game start: 5:02 pm MST
- Elapsed time: 3:04
- Game attendance: 64,209
- Game weather: 77 °F (25 °C), Mostly Cloudy, winds W 10 mph
- Referee: Jeff Flanagan
- TV announcers (Versus): Joe Beninati, Glenn Parker, & Lindy Thackston

Scoring summary
| 1 | 10:05 | FSU | T Jones 4-yard run (D Hopkins kick) | FSU 7-0 |
| 2 | 14:25 | FSU | L Pryor 1-yard run (D Hopkins kick failed) | FSU 13-0 |
| 2 | 9:39 | BYU | Harevy Unga 12-yard run (Mitch Payne kick) | FSU 13-7 |
| 2 | 8:25 | FSU | L Pryor 9-yard rush (D Hopkins kick) | FSU 20-7 |
| 2 | 5:11 | BYU | Manase Tonga 3-yard pass from Max Hall (Mitch Payne kick) | FSU 20-14 |
| 2 | 0:24 | FSU | C Piurowski 5-yard pass from C Ponder (D Hopkins kick) | FSU 27-14 |
| 2 | 0:00 | FSU | D Hopkins 33-yard FG | FSU 30-14 |
| 3 | 12:52 | FSU | JG Reid 63-yard Int return from Max Hall (D Hopkins kick) | FSU 37-14 |
| 3 | 5:11 | FSU | JC Ponder 6-yard run (D Hopkins kick) | FSU 44-14 |
| 3 | 0:00 | BYU | Spencer Hafoka 8-yard pass from Max Hall (Mitch Payne kick) | FSU 44-21 |
| 4 | 10:21 | FSU | JD Hopkins 31-yard FG | FSU 47-21 |
| 4 | 7:32 | FSU | J Fortson 16-yard pass from C Ponder (D Hopkins kick) | FSU 54-21 |
| 4 | 3:13 | BYU | JJ Di Luigi 29-yard pass from Riley Nelson (Mitch Payne kick) | FSU 54-28 |

=== Colorado State ===
BYU would try and bounce back after the loss to FSU. The loss to FSU ended a winning streak the Cougs had had at home since 2004. With a 37-27-3 record against the Rams, things looked good for BYU.

Colorado State at #19 BYU

| Team | 1 | 2 | 3 | 4 | Total |
|---|---|---|---|---|---|
| Rams | 0 | 7 | 7 | 9 | 23 |
| • Cougars | 21 | 0 | 7 | 14 | 42 |

- Date: September 26
- Location: LaVell Edwards Stadium, Provo, UT
- Game start: 4:06 pm MST
- Elapsed time: 3:14
- Game attendance: 64,091
- Game weather: 80 °F (27 °C), Sunny, winds W 7 mph
- Referee: Dan Romeo
- TV announcers (Mtn.): James Bates, Todd Christensen, & Sammy Linebaugh

Scoring summary
| 1 | 12:44 | BYU | Harvey Unga 4-yard run (Mitch Payne kick) | BYU 7-0 |
| 1 | 3:04 | BYU | Max Hall 1-yard run (Mitch Payne kick) | BYU 14-0 |
| 1 | 0:25 | BYU | Harevy Unga 5-yard run (Mitch Payne kick) | BYU 21-0 |
| 2 | 9:56 | CSU | Dion Morton 9-yard pass from Grant Stucker (Ben Deline kick) | BYU 21-7 |
| 3 | 6:56 | BYU | Dennis Pitta 18-yard pass from Max Hall (Mitch Payne kick) | BYU 28-7 |
| 3 | 2:51 | CSU | Leonard Mason 5-yard run (Ben Deline kick) | BYU 28-14 |
| 4 | 14:02 | CSU | Ben Deline 38-yard FG | BYU 28-17 |
| 4 | 7:04 | BYU | Harvey Unga 2-yard run (Mitch Payne kick) | BYU 35-17 |
| 4 | 5:02 | CSU | Tyson Liggett 13-yard pass from Grant Stucker. (2-point conversion failed) | BYU 35-23 |
| 4 | 4:05 | BYU | Spencer Hafoka 24-yard pass from Max Hall (Mitch Payne kick) | BYU 42-23 |

=== Utah State ===
The 2009 Beehive Boot began with the Battle for the Old Wagon Wheel as Utah State visited the Cougars. With a 42-23-3 record in one of the longest rivalries in the nation, BYU looked to try to continue to show the FSU game was a fluke.

Utah State at #20 BYU

| Team | 1 | 2 | 3 | 4 | Total |
|---|---|---|---|---|---|
| Aggies | 7 | 0 | 3 | 7 | 17 |
| • Cougars | 7 | 14 | 0 | 14 | 35 |

- Date: October 2
- Location: LaVell Edwards Stadium, Provo, UT
- Game start: 7:06 pm MST
- Elapsed time: 2:59
- Game attendance: 64,103
- Game weather: 54 °F (12 °C), Clear, winds 0 mph
- Referee: Steve Barth
- TV announcers (Mtn.): Bill Doleman, Blaine Fowler, & Toby Christensen

Scoring summary
| 1 | 10:28 | USU | Diondre Borel 6-yard run (Chris Ulinkski kick) | USU 7-0 |
| 1 | 2:14 | BYU | Dennis Pitta 6-yard pass from Max Hall (Mitch Payne kick) | Tied 7-7 |
| 2 | 14:22 | BYU | Luke Ashworth 48-yard pass from Max hall (Mitch Payne kick) | BYU 14-7 |
| 2 | 0:29 | BYU | Manase Tonga 3-yard run (Mitch Payne kick) | BYU 21-7 |
| 3 | 8:05 | USU | Chris Ulinski 20-yard field goal | BYU 21-10 |
| 4 | 13:09 | BYU | Harvey Unga 8-yard run (Mitch Payne kick) | BYU 28-10 |
| 4 | 2:45 | BYU | Dennis Pitta 13-yard pass from Max Hall (Mitch Payne kick) | BYU 35-10 |
| 4 | 0:03 | USU | Xavier Bowman 16-yard pass from Diondre Borel (Chris Ulinski kick) | BYU 35-17 |

=== UNLV ===
After the Conference Weekend showdown, the Cougs headed on the road for their second road game of the year against a team they have thoroughly dominated, UNLV. Going into the 2009 season, the Cougars found themselves 13-3 against the Rebels lifetime.

#18 BYU at UNLV

| Team | 1 | 2 | 3 | 4 | Total |
|---|---|---|---|---|---|
| • Cougars | 10 | 14 | 21 | 14 | 59 |
| Rebels | 7 | 14 | 0 | 14 | 35 |

- Date: October 10
- Location: Sam Boyd Stadium, Las Vegas, NV
- Game start: 8:06 pm MST
- Elapsed time: 2:53
- Game attendance: 25,597
- Game weather: 81 °F (27 °C), Partly Cloudy, winds E 9 mph
- Referee: David Smith
- TV announcers (Mtn.): Tim Neverett, Blaine Fowler, & Molly Sullivan

Scoring summary
| 1 | 5:20 | BYU | Mitch Payne 28-yard field goal | BYU 3-0 |
| 1 | 3:36 | BYU | Harvey Unga 33-yard run (Mitch Payne kick) | BYU 10-0 |
| 2 | 13:18 | BYU | Harvey Unga 1-yard run (Mitch Payne kick) | BYU 17-0 |
| 2 | 13:05 | UNLV | Deante' Purvis 94-yard kickoff return (Kyle Watson kick) | BYU 17-7 |
| 2 | 11:12 | BYU | Harvey Unga 52-yard run (Mitch Payne kick) | BYU 24-7 |
| 3 | 10:20 | UNLV | M. Johnson 75-yard pass from Omar Clayton (Kyle Watson kick) | BYU 24-14 |
| 3 | 8:33 | BYU | Dennis Pitta 35-yard pass from Max Hall (Mitch Payne kick) | BYU 31-14 |
| 3 | 4:41 | BYU | Jojo Pili 1-yard run (Mitch Payne kick) | BYU 38-14 |
| 3 | 2:44 | BYU | JJ Di Luigi 15-yard pass from Max Hall (Mitch Payne kick) | BYU 45-14 |
| 4 | 13:40 | UNLV | R. Anthony 4-yard pass from Omar Clayton (Kyle Watson kick) | BYU 45-21 |
| 4 | 13:17 | BYU | Riley Nelson 2-yard run (Mitch Payne kick) | BYU 52-21 |
| 4 | 8:17 | BYU | JJ Di Luigi 2-yard run (Mitch Payne kick) | BYU 59-21 |

=== San Diego State ===
Back-to-back road games would be the norm most of the season, as was this case with Vegas and then San Diego. BYU would challenge the Aztecs with a 25–7–1 record against them intact.

#18 BYU at San Diego State

| Team | 1 | 2 | 3 | 4 | Total |
|---|---|---|---|---|---|
| • Cougars | 7 | 14 | 7 | 10 | 38 |
| Aztecs | 7 | 7 | 7 | 7 | 28 |

- Date: October 17
- Location: Qualcomm Stadium, San Diego, CA
- Game start: 4:06 pm MST
- Elapsed time: 3:16
- Game attendance: 30,258
- Game weather: 80 °F (27 °C), sunny and clear, winds WSW 7 mph
- Referee: Terry Leyden
- TV announcers (Mtn.): Ari Wolfe, Blaine Fowler, and Jenny Cavnar

Scoring summary
| 1 | 5:33 | BYU | Harvey Unga 1-yard run (Mitch Payne kick) | BYU 7-0 |
| 1 | 4:31 | SDSU | DeMarc Sampson 7-yard pass from Ryan Lindley (Lane Yoshida kick) | Tied 7-7 |
| 2 | 14:20 | SDSU | Brand Sullivan 1-yard run (Lane Yoshida kick) | SDSU 14-7 |
| 2 | 9:06 | BYU | Bryan Kariya 3-yard pass from Max Hall (Mitch Payne kick) | Tied 14-14 |
| 2 | 0:0 | BYU | Max Hall 1-yard run (Mitch Payne kick) | BYU 21-14 |
| 3 | 8:23 | SDSU | DeMarc Sampson 36-yard pass from Ryan Lindley (Lane Yoshida kick) | Tied 21-21 |
| 3 | 3:38 | BYU | Andrew George 19-yard pass from Max Hall (Mitch Payne kick) | BYU 28-21 |
| 4 | 14:49 | BYU | Dennis Pitta 9-yard pass from Max Hall (Mitch Payne kick) | BYU 35–21 |
| 4 | 8:17 | SDSU | Alston Umuolo 6-yard pass from Ryan Lindley (Lane Yoshida kick) | BYU 35–28 |
| 4 | 2:21 | BYU | Mitch Payne 44-yard field goal | BYU 38–28 |

=== TCU ===
Heading into Homecoming BYU looked to get back on the winning track against TCU. The Cougars had won 5 of the first 7 meetings against TCU, but the Horned Frogs took the win in 2008 to get their 3rd win against the Cougars.

#8 TCU at #16 BYU

| Team | 1 | 2 | 3 | 4 | Total |
|---|---|---|---|---|---|
| • Horned Frogs | 14 | 7 | 10 | 7 | 38 |
| Cougars | 0 | 7 | 0 | 0 | 7 |

- Date: October 24
- Location: LaVell Edwards Stadium, Provo, UT (College Gameday)
- Game start: 5:36 pm MST
- Elapsed time: 2:47
- Game attendance: 64,641
- Game weather: 54 °F (12 °C), Cloudy with showers, winds S 6 mph
- Referee: T. Adrian Hill
- TV announcers (Versus): Joe Beninati, Glenn Parker, & Tim Neverett

Scoring summary
| 1 | 6:16 | TCU | Joseph Turner 4-yard run (Ross Evans kick) | TCU 7-0 |
| 1 | 2:27 | TCU | Ed Wesley 28-yard pass from Andy Dalton (Ross Evans kick) | TCU 14-0 |
| 2 | 5:03 | TCU | Jimmy Young 12-yard pass from Andy Dalton (Ross Evans kick) | TCU 21-0 |
| 2 | 1:42 | BYU | Harvey Unga 3-yard pass from Max Hall (Mitch Payne kick) | TCU 21-7 |
| 3 | 9:35 | TCU | Ross Evans 28-yard field goal | TCU 24-7 |
| 3 | 5:53 | TCU | Antoine Hicks 75-yard pass from Andy Dalton (Ross Evans kick) | TCU 31-7 |
| 4 | 12:00 | TCU | Ross Tucker 7-yard run (Russ Evans kick) | TCU 38-7 |

=== Wyoming ===
BYU hit the road for the final back-to-back road trip of the year. Their first stop would be in Laramie. The Cougars came into the game with a 42-30-3 record against the Cowboys.

#25 BYU at Wyoming

| Team | 1 | 2 | 3 | 4 | Total |
|---|---|---|---|---|---|
| • Cougars | 14 | 7 | 10 | 7 | 38 |
| Cowboys | 0 | 0 | 0 | 0 | 0 |

- Date: November 7
- Location: War Memorial Stadium, Laramie, WY
- Game start: 12:05 pm MST
- Elapsed time: 2:45
- Game attendance: 19,201
- Game weather: 54 °F (12 °C), Partly Cloudy, winds S 13 mph
- Referee: Randy Smith
- TV announcers (Mtn.): James Bates, Todd Christensen, & Andrea Lloyd

Scoring summary
| 1 | 4:43 | BYU | JJ Di Luigi 44-yard pass from Max Hall (Mitch Payne kick) | BYU 7-0 |
| 1 | 2:33 | BYU | Mitch Payne 36-yard field goal | BYU 10-0 |
| 2 | 13:12 | BYU | Manase Tonga 2-yard pass from Max Hall (Mitch Payne kick) | BYU 17-0 |
| 2 | 10:41 | BYU | McKay Jacobson 79-yard pass from Max Hall (Mitch Payne kick) | BYU 24-0 |
| 2 | 4:24 | BYU | Manase Tonga 6-yard run (Mitch Payne kick) | BYU 31-0 |
| 3 | 10:10 | BYU | Bryan Kariya 2-yard run (Mitch Payne kick) | BYU 38-0 |
| 3 | 7:17 | BYU | JJ Di Luigi 15-yard pass from Max Hall (Mitch Payne kick) | BYU 45-0 |
| 4 | 4:48 | BYU | Riley Nelson 10-yard run (Mitch Payne kick) | BYU 52-0 |

=== New Mexico ===
The final road game on the back-to-back road trip took the Cougars to Albuquerque for their regular showdown with the Lobos. The Cougars came into the game with a 43-13-3 record against the Lobos.

#22 BYU at New Mexico

| Team | 1 | 2 | 3 | 4 | Total |
|---|---|---|---|---|---|
| • Cougars | 7 | 10 | 7 | 0 | 24 |
| Lobos | 7 | 0 | 6 | 6 | 19 |

- Date: November 14
- Location: University Stadium, Albuquerque, NM
- Game start: 12:06 pm MST
- Elapsed time: 3:06
- Game attendance: 24,344
- Game weather: 47 °F (8 °C), Cloudy, winds ESE 7 mph
- Referee: David Epperley
- TV announcers (Mtn.): Ari Wolfe, Blaine Fowler, & Keenan McCardell

Scoring summary
| 1 | 8:43 | UNM | Donov Porterie 3-yard run (James Aho kick) | UNM 7-0 |
| 1 | 0:51 | BYU | Manase Tonga 1-yard run (Mitch Payne kick) | Tied 7-7 |
| 2 | 5:49 | BYU | Mitch Payne 42-yard field goal | BYU 10-7 |
| 2 | 1:56 | BYU | Andrew George 27-yard pass from Max Hall (Mitch Payne kick) | BYU 17-7 |
| 3 | 6:28 | UNM | Daryl Jones 26-yard pass from Donov Porterie (James Aho kick failed) | BYU 17-13 |
| 3 | 0:00 | BYU | Luke Ashworth 13-yard pass from Max Hall (Mitch Payne kick) | BYU 24-13 |
| 4 | 4:07 | UNM | Victor James 20-yard pass from Donov Porterie (Donov Porterie 2-point conversion pass failed) | BYU 24-19 |

=== Air Force ===
The final home stretch began with an old match-up against everybodies favorite run-and-gun squad, the Air Force Falcons. The Cougars came into the game with a 23-6 record against the Falcons.

Air Force at #22 BYU

| Team | 1 | 2 | 3 | 4 | Total |
|---|---|---|---|---|---|
| Falcons | 0 | 7 | 0 | 14 | 21 |
| • Cougars | 3 | 21 | 7 | 7 | 38 |

- Date: November 21
- Location: LaVell Edwards Stadium, Provo, UT
- Game start: 1:34 pm MST
- Elapsed time: 3:12
- Game attendance: 64,071
- Game weather: 46 °F (8 °C), Cloudy & Snow possible, winds NW 14 mph
- Referee: Land Clark
- TV announcers (CBS CS): Tom Hart & Aaron Taylor

Scoring summary
| 1 | 6:00 | BYU | Mitch Payne 49-yard field goal | BYU 3-0 |
| 2 | 13:57 | BYU | Dennis Pitta 8-yard pass from Max Hall (Mitch Payne kick) | BYU 10-0 |
| 2 | 11:46 | BYU | Dennis Pitta 16-yard pass from Max Hall (Mitch Payne kick) | BYU 17-0 |
| 2 | 5:15 | BYU | Luke Ashworth 9-yard pass from Max Hall (Mitch Payne kick) | BYU 24-0 |
| 2 | 3:15 | AFA | Josh Cousins 27-yard pass from Ben Cochran (Erik Soderberg kick) | BYU 24-7 |
| 3 | 13:24 | BYU | O'Niell Chambers 10-yard pass from Max Hall (Mitch Payne kick) | BYU 31-7 |
| 4 | 14:18 | AFA | Jonathan Warzecka 3-yard run (Erik Soderberg kick) | BYU 31-14 |
| 4 | 5:23 | BYU | Andrew George 9-yard pass from Max Hall (Mitch Payne kick) | BYU 38-14 |
| 4 | 1:57 | AFA | Savie Stephens 4-yard run (Erik Soderberg kick) | BYU 38-21 |

=== Utah ===
The regular season ended with the third edition of the Deseret First Duel. The winner would take a 2-1 lead in head-to-head football since the Holy War became sponsored by Deseret First Credit Union. The Cougars came into the game with a 30-50-4 against the Utes. With both teams at 6-1 in conference play, and with TCU likely headed to a BCS game, BYU and Utah came in knowing the winner would be getting a berth in the Las Vegas Bowl.

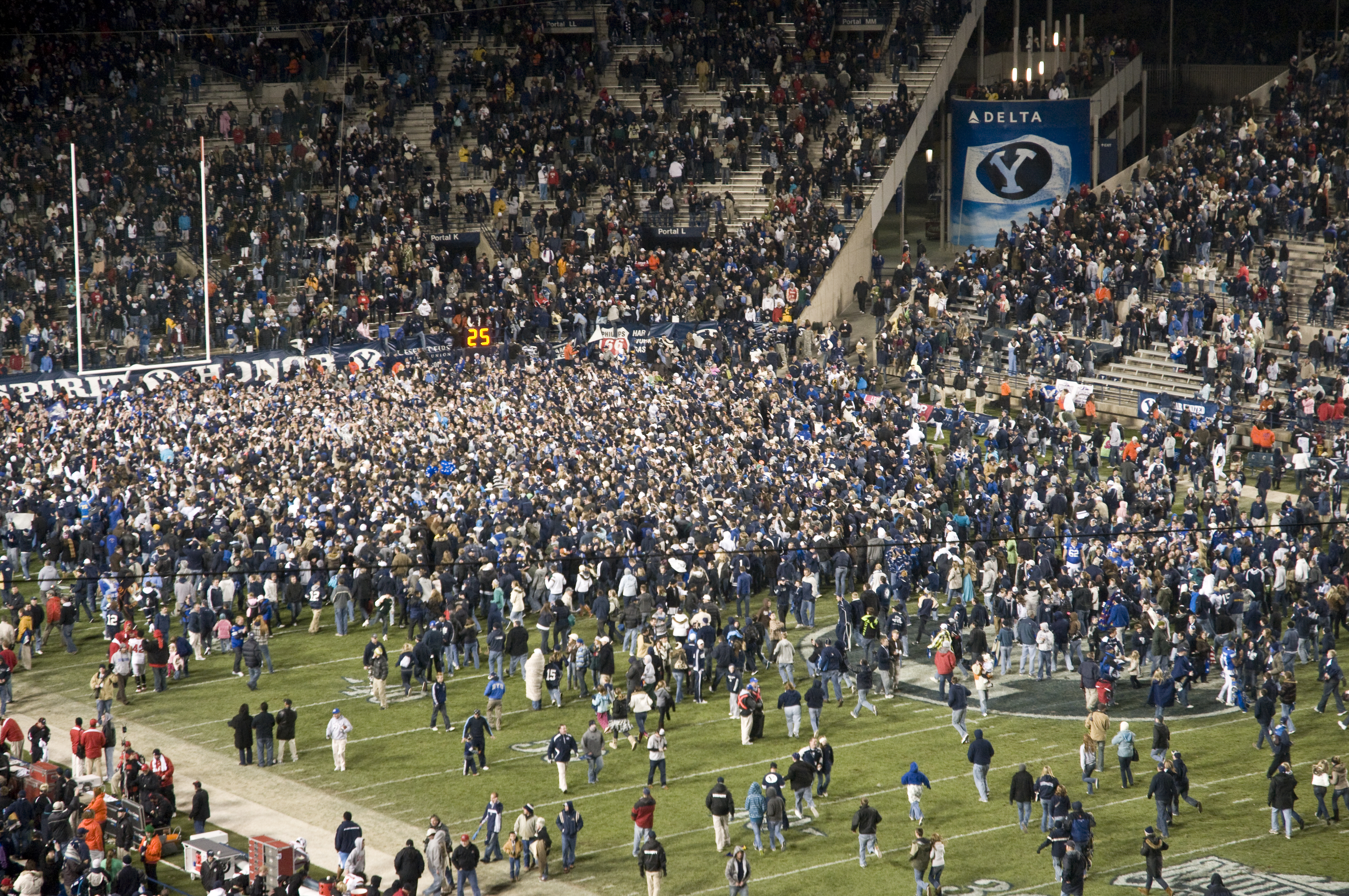
Fans storming the field at LaVell Edwards Stadium after #19 BYU beat #21 Utah 26-23 in overtime

#21 Utah at #19 BYU

| Team | 1 | 2 | 3 | 4 | OT | Total |
|---|---|---|---|---|---|---|
| Utes | 6 | 0 | 0 | 14 | 3 | 23 |
| • Cougars | 0 | 13 | 7 | 0 | 6 | 26 |

- Date: November 28
- Location: LaVell Edwards Stadium, Provo, UT
- Game start: 3:06 pm MST
- Elapsed time: 3:54
- Game attendance: 64,301
- Game weather: 45 °F (7 °C), Partly Cloudy & Hazy, winds NNW 9 mph
- Referee: Randy Christal
- TV announcers (Mtn. & CBS CS): James Bates, Todd Christensen, Toby Christensen, & Sammy Linebaugh

Scoring summary
| 1 | 11:16 | Utah | Joe Phillips 39-yard field goal | Utah 3-0 |
| 1 | 6:13 | Utah | Joe Phillips 21-yard field goal | Utah 6-0 |
| 2 | 14:47 | BYU | Mitch Payne 28-yard field goal | Utah 6-3 |
| 2 | 6:43 | BYU | Harvey Unga 2-yard run (Mitch Payne kick) | BYU 10-6 |
| 2 | 0:04 | BYU | Mitch Payne 37-yard field goal | BYU 13-6 |
| 3 | 10:11 | BYU | Manase Tonga 1-yard pass from Max Hall (Mitch Payne kick) | BYU 20-6 |
| 4 | 14:49 | Utah | Joe Phillips 31-yard field goal | BYU 20-9 |
| 4 | 7:16 | Utah | Eddie Wide 1-yard run (David Reed 2-point conversion from Jordan Wynn) | BYU 20-17 |
| 4 | 0:29 | Utah | Joe Phillips 40-yard field goal | Tied 20-20 |
| OT | 0:00 | Utah | Joe Phillips 29-yard field goal | Utah 23-20 |
| OT | 0:00 | BYU | Andrew George 25-yard pass from Max Hall | BYU 26-23 |

=== Las Vegas Bowl ===
The fifth consecutive trip to the Las Vegas Bowl awaited BYU after their win over the Utes. Their opponent would be Bronco Mendenhall's alumni school- Oregon State, his first meeting against them with BYU. It was the first ever top 25 showdown in Vegas Bowl history. It also would feature a match of runner-up's as Oregon State was one of three teams tied for second in the Pac-10. BYU would go into the game with a 3-5 record lifetime against the Beavers. After going 19-for-30 for 192 yards with 3 touchdowns, Max Hall would win the MVP honor. Hall would leave as the most winning quarterback in BYU history at 43-9. His running back, Harvey Unga, would leave the school as the all-time leading rusher.

2009 Las Vegas Bowl: #18 Oregon State vs. #14 BYU

| Team | 1 | 2 | 3 | 4 | Total |
|---|---|---|---|---|---|
| Beavers | 7 | 0 | 0 | 13 | 20 |
| • Cougars | 14 | 9 | 7 | 14 | 44 |

- Date: December 22
- Location: Sam Boyd Stadium, Las Vegas, NV
- Game start: 6:01 pm MST
- Elapsed time: 3:37
- Game attendance: 40,018
- Game weather: 51 °F (11 °C), Cloudy, winds N 37-44 mph
- Referee: Randy Christal
- TV announcers (ESPN/Sports USA): Rece Davis, Lou Holtz, Mark May, & Todd Harris (ESPN)
  Rich Cellini, Gary Barnett, & Roman Oben (Sports USA)

Scoring summary
| 1 | 8:46 | OSU | Sean Canfield 1-yard run (Justin Kahut kick) | OSU 7-0 |
| 1 | 2:47 | BYU | Harvey Unga 1-yard run (Mitch Payne kick) | Tied 7-7 |
| 1 | 1:41 | BYU | Matt Bauman 34-yard fumble recovery | BYU 14-7 |
| 2 | 9:21 | BYU | Mitch Payne 28-yard field goal | BYU 17-7 |
| 2 | 6:22 | BYU | Luke Ashworth 25-yard pass from Max Hall (Mitch Payne kick failed) | BYU 23-7 |
| 3 | 8:51 | BYU | Dennis Pitta 17-yard pass from Max Hall (Mitch Payne kick) | BYU 30-7 |
| 4 | 12:51 | BYU | Manase Tonga 15-yard pass from Max Hall (Mitch Payne kick) | BYU 37-7 |
| 4 | 9:00 | OSU | Jacq. Rodgers 1-yard run (Justin Kahut kick failed) | BYU 37-13 |
| 4 | 3:22 | BYU | Manase Tonga 18-yard run (Mitch Payne kick) | Tied 44-13 |
| 4 | 2:35 | OSU | Damola Adeniji 31-yard pass from Ryan Katz (Justin Kahut kick) | BYU 44-20 |
