= 2009 San Diego State Aztecs football team =

American college football season

2009 San Diego State Aztecs football
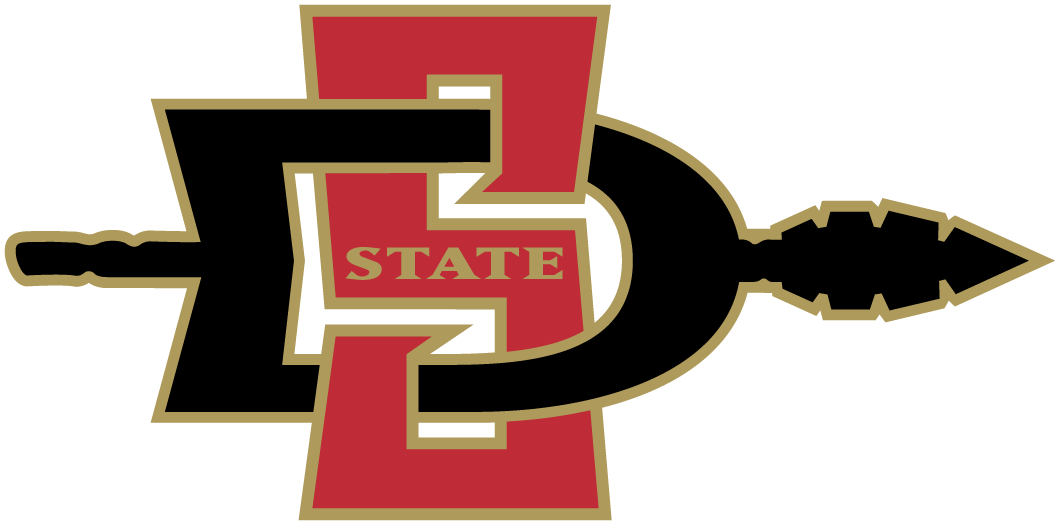
- Conference: Mountain West Conference
- Record: 4–8 (2–6 MW)
- Head coach: Brady Hoke (1st season)
- Offensive coordinator: Al Borges (1st season)
- Offensive scheme: Pro-style
- Defensive coordinator: Rocky Long (1st season)
- Base defense: 3–3–5
- Home stadium: Qualcomm Stadium

2009 Mountain West Conference football standings
	Conf.			Overall
Team	W		L	W		L
No. 6 TCU $	8	–	0	12	–	1
No. 12 BYU	7	–	1	11	–	2
No. 18 Utah	6	–	2	10	–	3
Air Force	5	–	3	8	–	5
Wyoming	4	–	4	7	–	6
UNLV	3	–	5	5	–	7
San Diego State	2	–	6	4	–	8
New Mexico	1	–	7	1	–	11
Colorado State	0	–	8	3	–	9
$ – Conference champion and BCS representative as top non-AQ school to meet automatic qualification criteria; Rankings from AP Poll

The 2009 San Diego State Aztecs football team represented San Diego State University in the 2009 NCAA Division I FBS football season. The Aztecs, led by first-year head coach Brady Hoke, played their home games at Qualcomm Stadium. They finished with a record of 4–8 (2–6 MWC).

== Schedule ==
Date	Time	Opponent	Site	TV	Result	Attendance	Source
September 5	4:30 pm	at UCLA*	Rose Bowl; Pasadena, CA	FS West	L 14–33	55,761	
September 12	5:30 pm	Southern Utah*	Qualcomm Stadium; San Diego, CA		W 35–19	42,137	
September 19	2:00 pm	at Idaho*	Kibbie Dome; Moscow, ID	4SD	L 20–34	10,324	
September 26	11:00 am	at Air Force	Falcon Stadium; Colorado Springs, CO	The Mtn.	L 14–26	35,929	
October 3	5:00 pm	New Mexico State*	Qualcomm Stadium; San Diego, CA		W 34–17	21,184	
October 17	3:00 pm	BYU^{†}	Qualcomm Stadium; San Diego, CA	The Mtn.	L 28–38	30,258	
October 24	1:00 pm	at Colorado State	Hughes Stadium; Fort Collins, CO	The Mtn.	W 42–28	20,631	
October 31	4:30 pm	New Mexico	Qualcomm Stadium; San Diego, CA	CBSCS	W 23–20	12,647	
November 7	1:00 pm	TCU	Qualcomm Stadium; San Diego, CA	VS.	L 12–55	21,708	
November 14	7:00 pm	Wyoming	Qualcomm Stadium; San Diego, CA	The Mtn.	L 30–27	18,851	
November 21	1:00 pm	at Utah	Rice–Eccles Stadium; Salt Lake City, UT	VS.	L 7–38	44,991	
November 28	6:00 pm	at UNLV	Sam Boyd Stadium; Whitney, NV	The Mtn.	L 24–28	13,730	
*Non-conference game; ^{†}Homecoming; All times are in Pacific time
