= Mychal Sisson =

American football player (born 1988)

No. 6 – Colorado State Rams
- Position: Linebacker
- Class: (redshirt) senior

Personal information
- Born: October 1, 1988 (age 38); Indianapolis, Indiana
- Listed height: 5 ft 10 in (1.78 m)
- Listed weight: 218 lb (99 kg)

Career information
- High school: Duncanville High School, Duncanville, Texas
- College: Colorado State University (2007–2011)

Awards and highlights
- Second-team All-MW (2009); 2008 Freshman All-American (TSN)

Mychal Anthony Sisson (born October 1, 1988, in Indianapolis, Indiana) is an American college football linebacker.

Sisson ranked second among the nation's freshmen (behind Oklahoma's Travis Lewis) with a team-leading 105 tackles (57 solo), including eight stops for loss and ½ quarterback sack, while breaking up three passes, forcing a fumble, and recovering two more, one of which he returned for a touchdown. He subsequently earned Sporting News′ Freshman All-American team honors.
