= 2009 UNLV Rebels football team =

American college football season

2009 UNLV Rebels football
- Conference: Mountain West Conference
- Record: 5–7 (3–5 MW)
- Head coach: Mike Sanford Sr. (5th season)
- Offensive coordinator: Todd Berry (3rd season)
- Defensive coordinator: Dennis Therrell (2nd season)
- Home stadium: Sam Boyd Stadium

2009 Mountain West Conference football standings
	Conf.			Overall
Team	W		L	W		L
No. 6 TCU $	8	–	0	12	–	1
No. 12 BYU	7	–	1	11	–	2
No. 18 Utah	6	–	2	10	–	3
Air Force	5	–	3	8	–	5
Wyoming	4	–	4	7	–	6
UNLV	3	–	5	5	–	7
San Diego State	2	–	6	4	–	8
New Mexico	1	–	7	1	–	11
Colorado State	0	–	8	3	–	9
$ – Conference champion and BCS representative as top non-AQ school to meet automatic qualification criteria; Rankings from AP Poll

The 2009 UNLV Rebels football team represented the University of Nevada, Las Vegas (UNLV) as a member of the Mountain West Conference (MW) during the 2009 NCAA Division I FBS football season. Led by Mike Sanford Sr. in his fifth and final year as head coach, the Rebels compiled an overall record of 5–7 record with mark of 3–5 in conference play, placing sixth in the MW. The team played home games at Sam Boyd Stadium in Whitney, Nevada.

In November, Mike Sanford was fired after five losing seasons, a 16–43 overall record, and no bowl game appearances. He won his last game as head coach against San Diego State on November 28, 28–24, with a fourth quarter comeback.

== Schedule ==
Date	Time	Opponent	Site	TV	Result	Attendance	Source
September 5	7:00 p.m.	Sacramento State*	Sam Boyd Stadium; Whitney, NV		W 38–3	22,195	
September 12	8:00 p.m.	No. 24 Oregon State*	Sam Boyd Stadium; Whitney, NV	CBSCS	L 21–23	25,967	
September 19	8:00 p.m.	Hawaii*	Sam Boyd Stadium; Whitney, NV	mtn., CBSCS	W 34–33	29,717	
September 26	12:00 p.m.	at Wyoming	War Memorial Stadium; Laramie, WY		L 27–30	19,196	
October 3	1:00 p.m.	at Nevada*	Mackay Stadium; Reno, NV (Fremont Cannon)		L 28–63	24,078	
October 10	7:00 p.m.	No. 20 BYU	Sam Boyd Stadium; Whitney, NV	mtn.	L 21–59	25,597	
October 17	7:00 p.m.	No. 24 Utah^{†}	Sam Boyd Stadium; Whitney, NV	mtn.	L 15–35	26,315	
October 24	5:00 p.m.	at New Mexico	University Stadium; Albuquerque, NM	mtn.	W 34–17	24,021	
October 31	1:00 p.m.	at No. 6 TCU	Amon G. Carter Stadium; Fort Worth, TX	Versus	L 0–41	33,541	
November 7	7:00 p.m.	Colorado State	Sam Boyd Stadium; Whitney, NV	mtn.	W 35–16	15,902	
November 14	3:00 p.m.	at Air Force	Falcon Stadium; Colorado Springs, CO	mtn.	L 17–45	25,370	
November 28	6:00 p.m.	San Diego State	Sam Boyd Stadium; Whitney, NV	mtn.	W 28–24	13,730	
*Non-conference game; ^{†}Homecoming; Rankings from AP Poll released prior to the game; All times are in Pacific time

== Preseason ==
At the 2009 Mountain West Conference Media Day in Las Vegas, the Rebels were picked to finish fifth in the conference, the highest preseason ranking since the Rebels were picked to finish tied for fifth with BYU in 2004. ESPN NFL analyst Mel Kiper, Jr. named the Rebels, along with Miami (FL), California and SMU, as one of his sleepers that could make "national noise" in 2009. Kiper stated: "If Omar Clayton, their quarterback, can stay healthy and get the ball to Ryan Wolfe, UNLV, I think, can go bowling for the first time in a long time and be a factor in the Mountain West Conference." Paul Myerberg of The New York Times ranked UNLV in the 84th position in their preseason Quad Countdown, in front of Ball State and behind UTEP. The ranking was an improvement of 27 spots from their 2008 preseason ranking of 111th. Myerberg predicted that the Rebels would go 6-6 and earn their first bowl berth since their 2000 Las Vegas Bowl victory against Arkansas.

Junior quarterback Omar Clayton received much praise during the preseason including that from The New York Times and Mel Kiper, Jr. and was named as one of the favorites to be named the conference's Offensive Player of the Year by Bleacher Report's Mountain West Conference writer. Senior wide receiver Ryan Wolfe was named as one of the best non-BCS receivers in the country by The New York Times and was named to the Biletnikoff Award watch list during the preseason. Wolfe entered the season only 50 receptions and 900 yards away from breaking the conference's career receptions and receiving yards records. Wolfe and senior linebacker Jason Beauchamp were both named to the All-MWC preseason team.

On July 3, sophomore linebacker Bryce Saldi suffered severe injuries following a skateboarding accident while in southern California. Saldi was placed in the intensive care unit at Loma Linda University Medical Center.

== Game summaries ==
=== Sacramento State ===
	1	2	3	4	Total
Hornets	0	3	0	0	3
Rebels	10	0	7	21	38

UNLV opened their season as a 22-point favorite against NCAA Division I Football Championship Subdivision (FCS) squad Sacramento State from the Big Sky Conference. Both teams' passing games were hampered by the 32 mph wind gusts that were recorded around the stadium. UNLV took a 10–3 lead into halftime after a one-yard touchdown run by junior runningback Channing Trotter and a 39-yard field goal by senior kicker Kyle Watson gave UNLV the 10–0 lead after the first quarter. Sacramento State scored their only points of the game on a 44-yard field goal by Hornets' kicker Chris Diniz

In the second half, the Rebels exploded on offense, starting with another 1-yard touchdown run by Trotter late in the third quarter. Trotter scored his third one-yard touchdown early in the fourth quarter to push the Rebels lead to 24–3. The Rebels increased their lead midway through the fourth on a 55-yard strike from senior quarterback Omar Clayton to senior wide receiver Rodelin Anthony. Clayton's backup, sophomore Mike Clausen, played the final minutes of the game and sealed the Rebels victory with a 4-yard touchdown run. The win against Sacramento State was their fourth straight opener.

=== Oregon State ===
	1	2	3	4	Total
Beavers	0	6	14	3	23
Rebels	0	0	7	14	21

=== Hawai'i ===
	1	2	3	4	Total
Warriors	10	10	0	13	33
Rebels	7	7	7	13	34

=== Wyoming ===
	1	2	3	4	Total
Rebels	7	6	7	7	27
Cowboys	3	10	7	10	30

=== Nevada ===
	1	2	3	4	Total
Rebels	0	21	7	0	28
Wolf Pack	14	7	14	28	63

=== BYU ===
	1	2	3	4	Total
Cougars	10	14	21	14	59
Rebels	0	7	7	7	21

=== Utah ===
	1	2	3	4	Total
Utes	7	21	0	7	35
Rebels	3	3	9	0	15

=== New Mexico ===
	1	2	3	4	Total
Rebels	14	7	3	10	34
Lobos	0	3	7	7	17

=== TCU ===
	1	2	3	4	Total
Rebels	0	0	0	0	0
Horned Frogs	10	10	7	14	41

=== Colorado State ===
	1	2	3	4	Total
Rams	0	7	3	6	16
Rebels	0	14	7	14	35

=== Air Force ===
	1	2	3	4	Total
Rebels	0	3	7	7	17
Falcons	7	17	7	14	45

=== San Diego State ===
	1	2	3	4	Total
Aztecs	14	7	3	0	24
Rebels	7	0	0	21	28

== Personnel ==
=== Recruiting ===
College recruiting
Name	Hometown	School	Height	Weight	40^{‡}	Commit date
Jordan Barrett; LB	Sherman Oaks, CA	Notre Dame HS	6 ft 3 in (1.91 m)	225 lb (102 kg)	4.7	Jan 28, 2009
Jordan Barrett; LB	Recruit ratings: Scout: Rivals:					
B.J. Bell; DE	Santa Ana, CA	Santa Ana College	6 ft 4 in (1.93 m)	245 lb (111 kg)	4.65	Jan 9, 2009
B.J. Bell; DE	Recruit ratings: Scout: Rivals:					
Caleb Herring; QB	Perris, CA	Citrus Hills HS	6 ft 4 in (1.93 m)	180 lb (82 kg)	4.75	Jun 5, 2008
Caleb Herring; QB	Recruit ratings: Scout: Rivals:					
Bradley Randle; RB	Murrieta, CA	Vista Murrieta HS	5 ft 10 in (1.78 m)	190 lb (86 kg)	4.40	Nov 25, 2008
Bradley Randle; RB	Recruit ratings: Scout: Rivals:					
Nathan Holloway; DT	Las Vegas, NV	Spring Valley HS	6 ft 2 in (1.88 m)	332 lb (151 kg)	5.36	Dec 7, 2008
Nathan Holloway; DT	Recruit ratings: Scout: Rivals:					
Doug Zismann; OL	Phoenix, AZ	Shadow Mountain HS	6 ft 2 in (1.88 m)	265 lb (120 kg)	5.3	Nov 1, 2008
Doug Zismann; OL	Recruit ratings: Scout: Rivals:					
Kenny Brown; DB	Santa Clarita, CA	College of the Canyons	6 ft 0 in (1.83 m)	180 lb (82 kg)	—	Dec 16, 2008
Kenny Brown; DB	Recruit ratings: Scout: Rivals:					
Alex Degiacomo; DB	Torrance, CA	El Camino College	6 ft 1 in (1.85 m)	190 lb (86 kg)	4.57	Dec 17, 2008
Alex Degiacomo; DB	Recruit ratings: Scout: Rivals:					
Brandon Babineaux; WR	Folsom, CA	Folsom HS	6 ft 4 in (1.93 m)	200 lb (91 kg)	—	Feb 4, 2009
Brandon Babineaux; WR	Recruit ratings: Scout: Rivals:					
Courtney Bridget; DB	Baltimore, MD	Dunbar HS	6 ft 3 in (1.91 m)	185 lb (84 kg)	4.5	Dec 16, 2008
Courtney Bridget; DB	Recruit ratings: Scout: Rivals:					
Mark Barefield; WR	Mesquite, TX	North Mesquite HS	6 ft 2 in (1.88 m)	180 lb (82 kg)	—	Sep 29, 2008
Mark Barefield; WR	Recruit ratings: Scout: Rivals:					
Charles Childress; DB	Las Vegas, NV	Bishop Gorman HS	6 ft 0 in (1.83 m)	182 lb (83 kg)	4.59	Nov 3, 2008
Charles Childress; DB	Recruit ratings: Scout: Rivals:					
Mike Grant; DB	Rocklin, CA	Sierra HS	5 ft 10 in (1.78 m)	180 lb (82 kg)	4.5	Oct 26, 2008
Mike Grant; DB	Recruit ratings: Scout: Rivals:					
Sidney Hodge; DB	Las Vegas, NV	Palo Verde HS	5 ft 8 in (1.73 m)	162 lb (73 kg)	4.47	Feb 4, 2009
Sidney Hodge; DB	Recruit ratings: Scout: Rivals:					
Thomas Kilgore; OL	Fresno, CA	San Joaquin Memorial HS	6 ft 5 in (1.96 m)	305 lb (138 kg)	—	Jan 28, 2009
Thomas Kilgore; OL	Recruit ratings: Scout: Rivals:					
Andrew Mack; OL	Plano, TX	Plano West HS	6 ft 2 in (1.88 m)	290 lb (130 kg)	—	Nov 30, 2008
Andrew Mack; OL	Recruit ratings: Scout: Rivals:					
Irshad Stolden; WR	Rancho Cucamonga, CA	Rancho Cucamonga HS	5 ft 8 in (1.73 m)	180 lb (82 kg)	—	Jan 18, 2009
Irshad Stolden; WR	Recruit ratings: Scout: Rivals:					
Marcus Sullivan; RB	North Las Vegas, NV	Cheyenne HS	5 ft 8 in (1.73 m)	162 lb (73 kg)	4.55	Dec 11, 2008
Marcus Sullivan; RB	Recruit ratings: Scout: Rivals:					
John Therell; DB	Las Vegas, NV	Bishop Gorman HS	6 ft 1 in (1.85 m)	170 lb (77 kg)	–	Dec 15, 2008
John Therell; DB	Recruit ratings: Scout: Rivals:					
Reggie Umuolo; LB	Peoria, AZ	Centennial HS	5 ft 11 in (1.80 m)	195 lb (88 kg)	4.7	Jun 26, 2008
Reggie Umuolo; LB	Recruit ratings: Scout: Rivals:					
Robert Waterman; OL	Stevenson Ranch, CA	Vista Ranch HS	6 ft 2 in (1.88 m)	275 lb (125 kg)	—	Feb 4, 2009
Robert Waterman; OL	Recruit ratings: Scout: Rivals:					
Warren Ziegler; DB	San Mateo, CA	College of San Mateo	6 ft 1 in (1.85 m)	180 lb (82 kg)	4.4	Nov 30, 2008
Warren Ziegler; DB	Recruit ratings: Scout: Rivals:					
Overall recruit ranking:
‡ Refers to 40-yard dash; Note: In many cases, Scout, Rivals, 247Sports, On3, and ESPN may conflict in their listings of height, weight and 40 time.; In these cases, the average was taken. ESPN grades are on a 100-point scale.; Sources: "UNLV Commit List for 2009". Rivals.; "UNLV: Commits". Scout.; "Scout.com Team Recruiting Rankings". Scout.; "2009 Team Ranking". Rivals.com.
