= 2009 New Mexico Lobos football team =

American college football season

2009 New Mexico Lobos football
- Conference: Mountain West Conference
- Record: 1–11 (1–7 MW)
- Head coach: Mike Locksley (1st season)
- Offensive coordinator: Darrell Dickey (1st season)
- Offensive scheme: Pro spread
- Defensive coordinator: Doug Mallory (1st season)
- Base defense: 4–3
- Home stadium: University Stadium

2009 Mountain West Conference football standings
	Conf.			Overall
Team	W		L	W		L
No. 6 TCU $	8	–	0	12	–	1
No. 12 BYU	7	–	1	11	–	2
No. 18 Utah	6	–	2	10	–	3
Air Force	5	–	3	8	–	5
Wyoming	4	–	4	7	–	6
UNLV	3	–	5	5	–	7
San Diego State	2	–	6	4	–	8
New Mexico	1	–	7	1	–	11
Colorado State	0	–	8	3	–	9
$ – Conference champion and BCS representative as top non-AQ school to meet automatic qualification criteria; Rankings from AP Poll

The 2009 New Mexico Lobos football team represented the University of New Mexico as a member of the Mountain West Conference (MW) during the 2009 NCAA Division I FBS football season. Led by first-year head coach Mike Locksley, the Lobos compiled an overall record of 1–11 with a mark of 1–7 in conference play, placing eighth in the MW. The team played home games at University Stadium in Albuquerque, New Mexico.

== Schedule ==
Date	Time	Opponent	Site	TV	Result	Attendance	Source
September 5	5:00 pm	at Texas A&M*	Kyle Field; College Station, TX		L 6–41	73,887	
September 12	6:00 pm	Tulsa*	University Stadium; Albuquerque, NM	Mtn	L 10–44	30,051	
September 19	5:30 pm	Air Force	University Stadium; Albuquerque, NM	CBSCS	L 13–37	26,246	
September 26	8:00 pm	New Mexico State*	University Stadium; Albuquerque, NM (Rio Grande Rivalry)	Mtn	L 17–20	35,248	
October 3	1:30 pm	at Texas Tech*	Jones AT&T Stadium; Lubbock, TX	FSN	L 28–48	52,909	
October 10	12:00 pm	at Wyoming	War Memorial Stadium; Laramie, WY	Mtn	L 13–37	14,502	
October 24	6:00 pm	UNLV^{†}	University Stadium; Albuquerque, NM	Mtn	L 17–34	24,021	
October 31	5:30 pm	San Diego State	Qualcomm Stadium; San Diego, CA	CBSCS	L 20–23	12,647	
November 7	4:00 pm	at Utah	Rice–Eccles Stadium; Salt Lake City, UT	Mtn	L 14–45	45,051	
November 14	12:00 pm	BYU	University Stadium; Albuquerque, NM	Mtn	L 19–24	24,344	
November 21	4:00 pm	Colorado State	University Stadium; Albuquerque, NM	Mtn	W 29–27	21,751	
November 28	11:00 am	at TCU	Amon G. Carter Stadium; Fort Worth, TX	Mtn	L 10–51	41,738	
*Non-conference game; ^{†}Homecoming; All times are in Mountain time
