= 2009 New Mexico Bowl =

American college football game

Fresno State Bulldogs	Wyoming Cowboys
(8–4)	(6–6)
WAC	Mountain West
28	35
Head coach: Pat Hill	Head coach: Dave Christensen
	1	2	3	4	OT	2OT	Total
Fresno State	0	14	7	7	0	0	28
Wyoming	7	7	3	11	0	7	35
- Date: December 19, 2009
- Season: 2009
- Stadium: University Stadium
- Location: Albuquerque, New Mexico
- MVP: QB Austyn Carta-Samuels, Wyoming DE Mitch Unrein, Wyoming
- Favorite: Fresno State by 11
- Referee: Mike Conlin (MAC)
- Attendance: 24,898
- Payout: US$750,000 per team

United States TV coverage
- Network: ESPN
- Announcers: Terry Gannon & David Norrie
- Nielsen ratings: 2.78

The 2009 New Mexico Bowl was a post-season American college football bowl game, held on December 19, 2009, at University Stadium on the campus of the University of New Mexico in Albuquerque, New Mexico, as part of the 2009–10 NCAA bowl season. The game, telecast on ESPN, featured the Wyoming Cowboys from the Mountain West Conference and the Fresno State Bulldogs from the WAC. This was the first trip to the New Mexico Bowl for Wyoming. It was also their first trip to a post season bowl game since the 2004 season when the Cowboys defeated the UCLA Bruins 24–21 in the Pioneer PureVison Las Vegas Bowl. This marked Fresno State's second straight trip to the New Mexico Bowl; they were defeated 40–35 by Colorado State in the 2008 contest. Before the 2009 New Mexico Bowl, Wyoming and Fresno State had played each other a total of six times, playing in consecutive years from 1992–1997 as rivals in the Western Athletic Conference; the teams have split their match-ups with each squad winning three games. The last meeting in 1997 was won by Fresno State, 24–7.

Behind freshman quarterback Austyn Carta-Samuels, Wyoming upset Fresno State 35–28 in the game, which went into double overtime after a late field goal by Cowboy kicker Ian Watts. Carta-Samuels threw three touchdowns in the win including the game-winner in overtime, a 13-yard strike to David Leonard.

== Game summary ==
Wyoming wore their home Brown uniforms, and Fresno wore white visitor uniforms. Wyoming freshman Austyn Carta-Samuels, the offensive MVP, threw for 201 yards and three touchdowns including the game-winning 13-yard touchdown pass to David Leonard. Defensive MVP Mitch Unrein tallied six tackles and two sacks for the Wyoming defense including a forced fumble midway through the 4th quarter which led to the game-tying field goal. Wyoming stopped the nation's leading rusher, Fresno State's Ryan Mathews, on three rushing attempts in the first overtime. The Bulldogs tried a quarterback sneak on third down, and Mathews came up short again on fourth down.

=== Scoring summary ===
Scoring summary

Quarter	Time	Drive			Team	Scoring information	Score	
Quarter	Time	Plays	Yards	TOP	Team	Scoring information	Fresno State	Wyoming
1	7:37	1	68	0:10	Wyoming	Alvester Alexander 68-yard touchdown run, Ian Watts kick good	0	7
2	12:22	7	51	3:29	Fresno State	Ryan Matthews 4-yard touchdown run, Kevin Goessling kick good	7	7
2	5:01	15	95	7:21	Wyoming	Greg Bolling 21-yard touchdown reception from Austyn Carta–Samuels, Jason Smith kick good	7	14
2	0:33	10	65	4:28	Fresno State	Jamel Hamler 10-yard touchdown reception from Ryan Colburn, Kevin Goessling kick good	14	14
3	13:06	6	71	1:54	Fresno State	Jamel Hamler 43-yard touchdown reception from Chastin West, Kevin Goessling kick good	21	14
3	8:19	9	39	4:47	Wyoming	40-yard field goal by Ian Watts	21	17
4	13:59	2	6	0:46	Fresno State	Ryan Matthews 5-yard touchdown run, Kevin Goessling kick good	28	17
4	10:15	7	72	5:51	Wyoming	David Leonard 11-yard touchdown reception from Austyn Carta–Samuels, 2-point pass good	28	25
4	0:20	19	54	7:48	Wyoming	37-yard field goal by Ian Watts	28	28
2OT		5	25		Wyoming	David Leonard 13-yard touchdown reception from Austyn Carta–Samuels, Ian Watts kick good	28	35
"TOP" = time of possession. For other American football terms, see Glossary of American football.							28	35

=== Statistics ===
Statistics	Fresno	Wyoming
First downs	19	26
Total offense, plays - yards	64-366	83-438
Rushes-yards (net)	44-197	50-234
Passing yards (net)	169	204
Passes, Comp-Att-Int	14-20-0	18-33-1
Time of Possession	26:47	33:13

== Game Notes ==
- Matthews led the nation in rushing for the 2009 season.
- Wyoming was playing in its first bowl since 2004.
- Carta-Samuels was the Mountain West Freshman of the Year.
- Fresno State made its second straight appearance - and loss - in the New Mexico Bowl.
