= 2009 Wyoming Cowboys football team =

American college football season

2009 Wyoming Cowboys football

New Mexico Bowl champion

New Mexico Bowl, W 35–28 ^{2OT} vs. Fresno State
- Conference: Mountain West Conference
- Record: 7–6 (4–4 MW)
- Head coach: Dave Christensen (1st season)
- Offensive coordinator: Marcus Arroyo (1st season)
- Offensive scheme: Spread
- Defensive coordinator: Marty English (1st season)
- Base defense: 4–3
- Home stadium: War Memorial Stadium

2009 Mountain West Conference football standings
	Conf.			Overall
Team	W		L	W		L
No. 6 TCU $	8	–	0	12	–	1
No. 12 BYU	7	–	1	11	–	2
No. 18 Utah	6	–	2	10	–	3
Air Force	5	–	3	8	–	5
Wyoming	4	–	4	7	–	6
UNLV	3	–	5	5	–	7
San Diego State	2	–	6	4	–	8
New Mexico	1	–	7	1	–	11
Colorado State	0	–	8	3	–	9
$ – Conference champion and BCS representative as top non-AQ school to meet automatic qualification criteria; Rankings from AP Poll

The 2009 Wyoming Cowboys football team represented the University of Wyoming as a member Mountain West Conference (MW) during the 2009 NCAA Division I FBS football season. Led by first-year head coach Dave Christensen, the Cowboys compiled an overall record of 7–6 record with mark 4–4 in conference play, placing fifth in the MW. Wyoming was invited to the New Mexico Bowl, where the Cowboys defeated Fresno State two overtimes. The team played home games at War Memorial Stadium in Laramie, Wyoming.

== Schedule ==
Date	Time	Opponent	Site	TV	Result	Attendance	Source
September 5	1:00 pm	Weber State*	War Memorial Stadium; Laramie, WY		W 29–22	18,016	
September 12	1:30 pm	No. 2 Texas*	War Memorial Stadium; Laramie, WY	Versus	L 10–41	31,017	
September 19	1:30 pm	at Colorado*	Folsom Field; Boulder, CO	FCS	L 0–24	50,535	
September 26	1:00 pm	UNLV	War Memorial Stadium; Laramie, WY		W 30–27	19,196	
October 3	2:00 pm	at Florida Atlantic*	Lockhart Stadium; Fort Lauderdale, FL		W 30–28	15,744	
October 10	12:00 pm	New Mexico	War Memorial Stadium; Laramie, WY	mtn.	W 37–13	14,502	
October 17	12:00 pm	at Air Force	Falcon Stadium; Colorado Springs, CO	mtn.	L 0–10	34,117	
October 31	6:00 pm	at No. 19 Utah	Rice–Eccles Stadium; Salt Lake City, UT	mtn.	L 10–22	44,837	
November 7	12:00 pm	No. 25 BYU	War Memorial Stadium; Laramie, WY	mtn.	L 0–52	19,201	
November 14	8:00 pm	at San Diego State	Qualcomm Stadium; San Diego, CA	mtn.	W 30–27	18,851	
November 21	12:00 pm	No. 4 TCU	War Memorial Stadium; Laramie, WY	mtn.	L 10–45	15,031	
November 27	12:00 pm	at Colorado State	Hughes Stadium; Fort Collins, CO (Border War)	mtn.	W 17–16	20,317	
December 19	2:30 pm	vs. Fresno State	University Stadium; Albuquerque, NM (New Mexico Bowl)	ESPN	W 35–28 ^{2OT}	24,898	
*Non-conference game; Rankings from AP Poll released prior to the game; All times are in Mountain time
