= Zane Beadles =

American football player (born 1986)

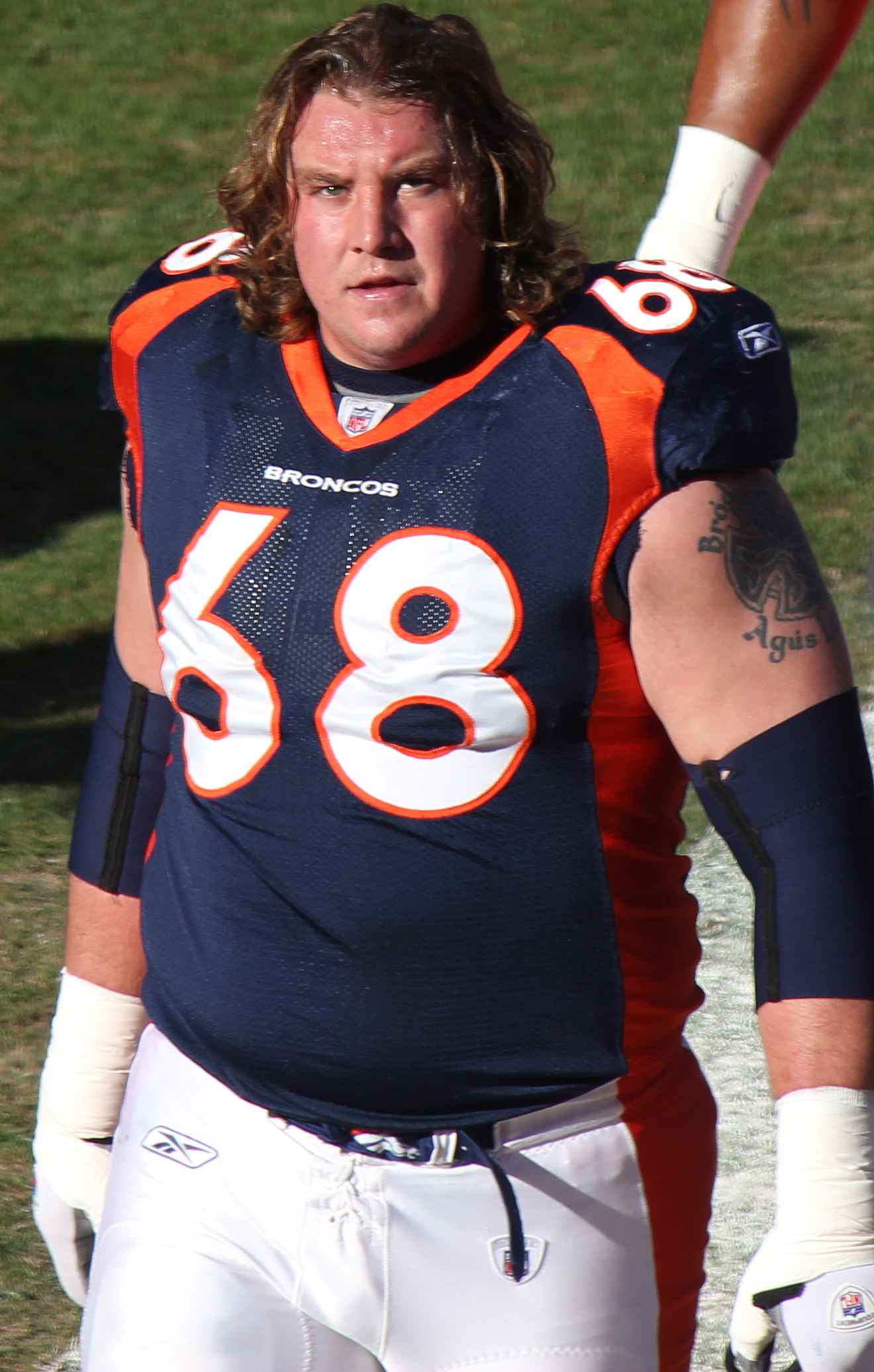
- Beadles with the Denver Broncos in 2012

No. 68, 69
- Position: Guard

Personal information
- Born: November 19, 1986 (age 40); Casper, Wyoming, U.S.
- Listed height: 6 ft 4 in (1.93 m)
- Listed weight: 305 lb (138 kg)

Career information
- High school: Hillcrest (Midvale, Utah)
- College: Utah (2006–2009)
- NFL draft: 2010: 2nd round, 45th overall pick

Career history
- Denver Broncos (2010–2013); Jacksonville Jaguars (2014–2015); San Francisco 49ers (2016–2017); Atlanta Falcons (2018)

Awards and highlights
- Pro Bowl (2012); First-team All-American (2009); 2× First-team All-MW (2008, 2009); Second-team All-MW (2007)

Career NFL statistics
- Games played: 137
- Games started: 120
- Stats at Pro Football Reference

Zane Dae Beadles (born November 19, 1986) is an American former professional football player who was a guard for nine seasons in the National Football League (NFL). He played college football for the Utah Utes and received All-American honors. Beadles was selected by the Denver Broncos in the second round of the 2010 NFL draft. He also played for the Jacksonville Jaguars, San Francisco 49ers, and Atlanta Falcons.

== Early life ==
Beadles attended Hillcrest High School in Midvale, Utah, where he was a three-year starter and did not miss a game during his high school football career. A two-way lineman, Beadles recorded 93 tackles, six sacks, and an interception for the defense and did not allow a quarterback sack as an offensive tackle as a senior. In addition, he earned first team all-state and all-region honors.

Considered only a two-star recruit by both Rivals.com and Scout.com, Beadles was not ranked among the nation's best offensive tackle prospects. He chose to attend the University of Utah over Wyoming, the alma mater of both of his parents.

== College career ==
After redshirting his initial year at Utah, Beadles played in all 13 games and started 12 at left guard (he came off the bench against BYU after missing practice with a concussion). He totaled 10 pancake blocks, 10 cut blocks, and 19 knockdowns. In his sophomore year, Beadles was moved from guard to tackle in Utah's preseason camp and started all 13 games at left tackle. He registered 22 pancake blocks, 37 knockdowns, and 17 cuts, and earned a second team All-MWC selection.

In his junior season, Beadles led the team with 40 knockdowns, while also having 42 pancake blocks and 27 cuts. He played and started in 12 games and earned first team All-MWC honors, helping the Utes reach a BCS bowl, an unbeaten 13–0 season and a No. 2 national ranking in the final AP Poll.

For the 2009 season, Beadles was named to the preseason watch list for the Outland Trophy and the Lombardi Award. He was also listed at No. 6 on Rivals.com′s preseason offensive tackle power ranking. He also was a First-team All-American by the FWAA.

In December 2009, Beadles earned his degree in mechanical engineering.

== Professional career ==
=== Pre-draft ===
Beadles was considered one of the best offensive linemen available for the 2010 NFL draft. Analysts projected him as either an offensive tackle or guard. He was compared to former Ute All-American Jordan Gross. He scored 36 on the Wonderlic intelligence test.

Pre-draft measurables
Height	Weight	Arm length	Hand span	Wonderlic
6 ft 4 1/2 in (1.94 m)	310 lb (141 kg)	33 3/4 in (0.86 m)	9 3/4 in (0.25 m)	36
All values from NFL Combine

=== Denver Broncos ===
The Denver Broncos selected Beadles in the second round (45th overall) of the 2010 NFL draft.

Beadles was named to his first Pro Bowl in 2012, replacing New England Patriots guard Logan Mankins.

As a member of the Broncos, Beadles played in all 16 games every one of his four seasons.

=== Jacksonville Jaguars ===
On March 11, 2014, Beadles signed a five-year, $30 million contract with the Jacksonville Jaguars, including $13 million guaranteed.

In Beadles's first two seasons, he started all 16 games of each of his two seasons with the Jaguars.

The Jaguars released Beadles on March 3, 2016.

=== San Francisco 49ers ===
On March 22, 2016, Beadles signed a three-year, $11.35 million deal with the San Francisco 49ers. In his first season, he started all 16 games at right guard. In 2017, he played in all 16 games, starting the season opener at left guard before losing the starting job to Laken Tomlinson, and four at right tackle in place of the injured Trent Brown.

On May 7, 2018, Beadles was released by the 49ers.

=== Atlanta Falcons ===
On October 30, 2018, Beadles was signed by the Atlanta Falcons. He was named the starting right guard in Week 13 following struggles from Ben Garland, and started the next five games.

=== Retirement ===
On June 10, 2019, Beadles announced his retirement from the NFL.
