= Robert Johnson (safety) =

American football player (born 1987)

No. 32
- Position: Safety

Personal information
- Born: February 13, 1987 (age 39); Gardena, California, U.S.
- Listed height: 6 ft 2 in (1.88 m)
- Listed weight: 195 lb (88 kg)

Career information
- High school: John C. Fremont (Los Angeles, California)
- College: Utah
- NFL draft: 2010: 5th round, 148th overall pick

Career history
- Tennessee Titans (2010−2012)

Awards and highlights
- First-team All-MW (2009)

Career NFL statistics
- Total tackles: 20
- Pass deflections: 1
- Interceptions: 1
- Stats at Pro Football Reference

Robert Lee Johnson (born February 13, 1987) is an American former professional football player who was a safety in the National Football League (NFL). He was selected by the Tennessee Titans in the fifth round of the 2010 NFL draft with the 148th overall pick. He played college football for the Utah Utes.

== Professional career ==
On July 27, 2010, Johnson signed his rookie contract with the Tennessee Titans. On August 11, 2013, Johnson was waived by the Titans.
