= Stevenson Sylvester =

American football player (born 1988)

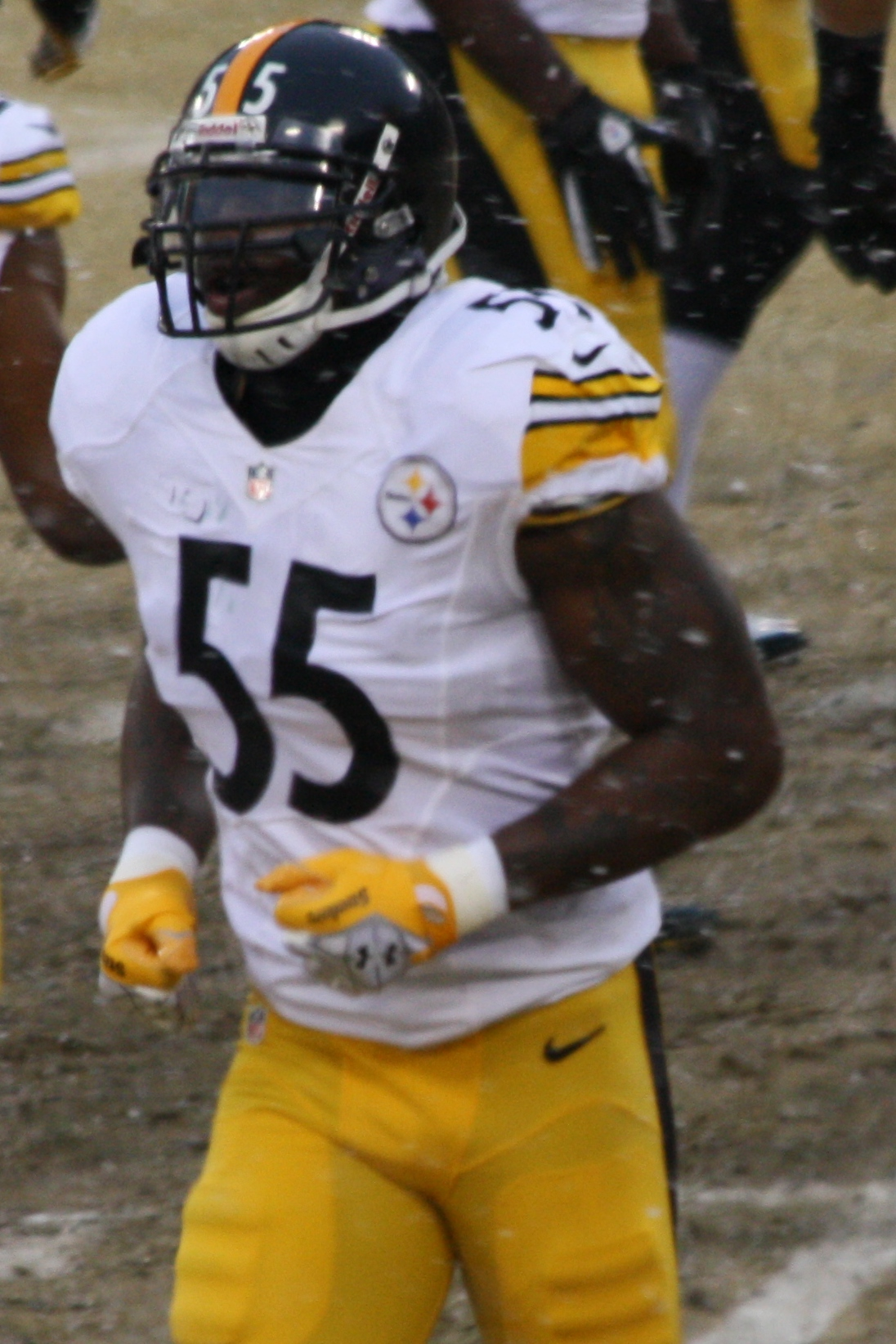
- Sylvester with the Pittsburgh Steelers in 2013

No. 55
- Position: Linebacker

Personal information
- Born: July 18, 1988 (age 38); Las Vegas, Nevada, U.S.
- Listed height: 6 ft 2 in (1.88 m)
- Listed weight: 231 lb (105 kg)

Career information
- High school: Valley (Winchester, Nevada)
- College: Utah
- NFL draft: 2010: 5th round, 166th overall pick

Career history
- Pittsburgh Steelers (2010−2013); Buffalo Bills (2014)

Awards and highlights
- First-team All-MW (2009); Second-team All-MW (2008)

Career NFL statistics
- Total tackles: 34
- Forced fumbles: 4
- Stats at Pro Football Reference

Stevenson Ellis Sylvester (born July 18, 1988) is an American former professional football player who was a linebacker in the National Football League (NFL). He played college football for the Utah Utes. He was selected by the Pittsburgh Steelers in the fifth round of the 2010 NFL draft.

== Early life ==
Sylvester was born to parents Worrel Sylvester and Angela Levi in Las Vegas, Nevada. His mother played college basketball for the Southern Utah University for four years. As a senior at Valley High School in Las Vegas, Sylvester was not highly recruited. The only school that made a scholarship offer, the University of Utah, only began recruiting Sylvester midway during his senior year.

== College career ==
As a true freshman in 2006, Sylvester started in 3 games, but saw action in 10. He ended his freshman season with 23 tackles, 1.5 for loss, 0.5 sacks, one pass defensed, one forced fumble and an interception which he returned 45 yards for a touchdown.

In 2007, Sylvester played in all 13 games, starting 8. He was second on the team in tackles and tackles for loss with 86 and 10 respectively. He had his best game of the year against his home town UNLV Rebels with 14 tackles 2.5 for a loss. He ended the year with 6 tackles in the bowl game against Navy and Honorable Mention All-MWC and helped lead the Utes to an eventual 9-4 record.

Sylvester was named as one of the defensive captains in his junior year and helped lead the 2008 Utes to a 13–0 record and a final ranking of No. 2 in the BCS rankings. Sylvester was named second-team All-MWC with 121 tackles, 16 for loss and 7.5 sacks. He finished the season with a remarkable performance in the Sugar Bowl, with 7 tackles, 3 sacks, 1 interception and a fumble recovery.

== Professional career ==
=== 2010 NFL draft ===
After a strong junior season, Stevenson Sylvester was projected to go in the second round of the 2010 draft. However, his draft stock dropped after his senior season statistics failed to meet expectations, and he was selected by the Steelers in the fifth round of the 2010 NFL Draft with the 166th overall pick.

=== Pittsburgh Steelers ===
On August 25, 2013, he was cut by the Steelers. He was re-signed on October 9, 2013, when the Steelers released linebacker Kion Wilson.

=== Buffalo Bills ===
On July 16, 2014, he was signed by the Buffalo Bills. On August 20, 2014, Sylvester was placed on injured reserved for a torn patellar tendon in his knee, ending his season.
