= Austyn Carta-Samuels =

American gridiron football player and coach (born 1991)

Meridian Warriors
- Title: Head coach

Personal information
- Born: April 20, 1991 (age 35)
- Listed height: 6 ft 1 in (1.85 m)
- Listed weight: 215 lb (98 kg)

Career information
- High school: Bellarmine
- College: Wyoming (2009–2010); Vanderbilt (2011–2013)
- NFL draft: 2014: undrafted

Career history

Playing
- Dresden Monarchs (2022)

Coaching
- Missouri (2014–2015) Recruiting graduate assistant; Missouri (2016–2017) Recruiting coordinator; Missouri (2018) Offensive quality control assistant; Missouri (2019) Director of character & culture development; Bellarmine College Prep (CA) (2020) Assistant coach; Menlo School (CA) (2021) Offensive coordinator; Meridian HS (ID) (2025–present) Head coach

Awards and highlights
- Scout Team Offensive Player of the Year (2011); MW Freshman of the Year (2009)

Austyn Carta-Samuels (born April 20, 1991) is an American football quarterback and coach. He is currently the head coach at Meridian High School in Meridian, Idaho. He played college football for the Wyoming Cowboys and Vanderbilt Commodores. He also played for the Dresden Monarchs of the German Football League (GFL). His younger brother Kyle was his predecessor in the role for the Monarchs.

== Early life ==
Carta-Samuels grew up in San Jose, California and attended Bellarmine College Preparatory. In his high school career, Carta-Samuels completed 140 of his 234 pass attempts for 2,058 yards, 11 touchdowns and six interceptions. He would also rush for 433 yards and 13 touchdowns. He was a three-star rated recruit and committed to play college football at the University of Wyoming.

== College career ==
=== Wyoming ===
During Carta-Samuels' true freshman season in 2009, he played in all 13 games and earned the title of the MWC Offensive Player of the Week for three consecutive weeks along with the MWC Freshman of the Year. He finished the season with completing 191 of his 326 passing attempts for 1,953 yards, 10 touchdowns and five interceptions, along with rushing for 366 yards. He was also named the Offensive MVP for the 2009 New Mexico Bowl. During the 2010 season, played in and started 11 games, finishing the season with completing 154 of his 252 passing attempts for 1,702 yards, nine touchdowns and eight interceptions, along with rushing for 392 yards and three touchdowns.

On January 10, 2011, Carta-Samuels announced that he would transfer from Wyoming.

=== Vanderbilt ===
On August 20, 2011, Carta-Samuels transferred to Vanderbilt.

Carta-Samuels sat out for the 2011 season, but he did earn the honor of the Scout Team Offensive Player of the Year from coaches after his fall practices. During the 2012 season, he played in six games as a top reserve quarterback and finished the season with completing 14 out of his 25 passing attempts for 208 yards and a touchdown, along with rushing for 27 yards. During the 2013 season, he played in and started 10 games, missing three games including the 2014 BBVA Compass Bowl due to an ACL injury. He finished the season with completing 193 out of his 281 passing attempts for 2,268 yards, 11 touchdowns and nine interceptions, along with rushing for 115 yards and five touchdowns.

== Coaching career ==
=== Missouri ===
In 2014, Carta-Samuels was hired as a recruiting graduate assistant at Missouri.

In 2016, he was promoted to a recruiting coordinator and in 2018 was promoted as an offensive quality control assistant.

In 2019, he was named as the program's first ever director of character and culture development.

On April 15, 2025, Carta-Samuels was named as the head coach at Meridian High School in Meridian, Idaho.

== Professional career ==
In 2022, Carta-Samuels signed to play for the Dresden Monarchs, where his brother had previously played for.

== Career statistics ==
=== GFL ===
Year	Team	Games			Passing								Rushing			
Year	Team	GP	GS	Record	Cmp	Att	Pct	Yds	Y/A	TD	Int	Rtg	Att	Yds	Avg	TD
2022	Dresden	5	5	2–3	88	141	62.4	864	6.1	10	4	131.6	7	–19	–2.7	0
Career		5	5	2–3	88	141	62.4	864	6.1	10	4	131.6	7	–19	–2.7	0

=== College ===
Year	Team	Games			Passing								Rushing			
Year	Team	GP	GS	Record	Cmp	Att	Pct	Yds	Y/A	TD	Int	Rtg	Att	Yds	Avg	TD
2009	Wyoming	13	10	6–4	191	326	58.6	1,953	6.0	10	5	116.0	142	366	2.6	3
2010	Wyoming	11	11	3–8	154	252	61.1	1,702	6.8	9	8	123.3	117	392	3.4	3
2011	Vanderbilt	Did not play due to NCAA transfer rules														
2012	Vanderbilt	6	1	1–0	16	25	56.0	208	8.3	1	0	139.1	5	27	5.4	0
2013	Vanderbilt	10	10	7–3	193	281	68.7	2,268	8.1	11	9	143.0	75	115	1.5	5
Career		40	32	17–15	552	884	62.4	6,131	6.9	31	22	127.3	339	900	2.7	11
