= 2009 Army Black Knights football team =

American college football season

2009 Army Black Knights football
- Conference: Independent
- Record: 5–7
- Head coach: Rich Ellerson (1st season)
- Co-offensive coordinators: Gene McKeehan (1st season); Ian Shields (1st season)
- Offensive scheme: Triple option
- Co-defensive coordinators: Payam Saadat (1st season); Chris Smeland (1st season)
- Base defense: Double Eagle Flex
- Captains: Stephen Anderson; Victor Ugenyi; Alejandro Villanueva
- Home stadium: Michie Stadium

2009 NCAA Division I FBS independents football records
	Conf.			Overall
Team	W		L	W		L
Navy		–		10	–	4
Notre Dame		–		6	–	6
Army		–		5	–	7
Rankings from AP Poll

The 2009 Army Black Knights football team represented the United States Military Academy (USMA or "West Point") as an independent during the 2009 NCAA Division I FBS football season. Led by first-year head coach Rich Ellerson, the Black Knights finished the season with a record of 5–7.

== Schedule ==
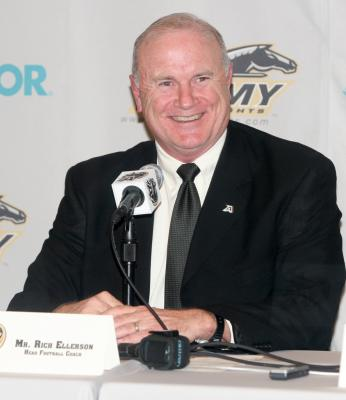
Rich Ellerson at a press conference upon announcement of his hire as the Army Black Knights football coach, January 2009

Date	Time	Opponent	Site	TV	Result	Attendance	Source
September 5	7:00 p.m.	at Eastern Michigan	Rynearson Stadium; Ypsilanti, MI		W 27–14	14,499	
September 12	12:00 p.m.	Duke	Michie Stadium; West Point, NY	CBSCS	L 19–35	25,698	
September 19	12:00 p.m.	Ball State	Michie Stadium; West Point, NY	CBSCS	W 24–17	25,646	
September 26	7:00 p.m.	at Iowa State	Jack Trice Stadium; Ames, IA		L 10–31	50,532	
October 3	12:00 p.m.	Tulane^{†}	Michie Stadium; West Point, NY	CBSCS	L 16–17	26,076	
October 10	12:00 p.m.	Vanderbilt	Michie Stadium; West Point, NY	CBSCS	W 16–13 ^{OT}	34,357	
October 17	1:00 p.m.	at Temple	Lincoln Financial Field; Philadelphia, PA		L 13–27	14,275	
October 23	8:00 p.m.	Rutgers	Michie Stadium; West Point, NY	ESPN2	L 10–27	24,098	
November 7	3:30 p.m.	at Air Force	Falcon Stadium; Colorado Springs, CO (Commander-in-Chief's Trophy, College GameDay)	CBSCS	L 7–35	46,212	
November 14	12:00 p.m.	VMI	Michie Stadium; West Point, NY	CBSCS	W 22–17	32,109	
November 21	4:00 p.m.	at North Texas	Fouts Field; Denton, TX		W 17–13	23,647	
December 12	2:30 p.m.	vs. Navy	Lincoln Financial Field; Philadelphia, PA (Army–Navy Game)	CBS	L 3–17	69,541	
^{†}Homecoming; All times are in Eastern time

== Game summaries ==
=== Eastern Michigan ===
	1	2	3	4	Total
Army Black Knights	6	7	0	14	27
Eastern Michigan Eagles	0	0	0	14	14

=== Duke ===
	1	2	3	4	Total
Duke Blue Devils	0	7	7	21	35
Army Black Knights	7	3	3	6	19

=== Ball State ===
	1	2	3	4	Total
Ball State Cardinals	7	3	7	0	17
Army Black Knights	7	10	0	7	24

=== Iowa State ===
	1	2	3	4	Total
Army Black Knights	3	7	0	0	10
Iowa State Cyclones	3	14	7	7	31

=== Tulane ===
	1	2	3	4	Total
Army Black Knights	10	0	0	6	16
Tulane Green Wave	0	7	0	10	17

=== Vanderbilt ===
	1	2	3	4	OT	Total
Vanderbilt Commodores	0	0	3	10	0	13
Army Black Knights	0	3	0	10	3	16

=== Temple ===
	1	2	3	4	Total
Army Black Knights	0	3	10	0	13
Temple Owls	7	6	0	14	27

=== Rutgers ===
	1	2	3	4	Total
Rutgers Scarlet Knights	17	0	3	7	27
Army Black Knights	3	0	7	0	10

=== Air Force ===
	1	2	3	4	Total
Army Black Knights	7	0	0	0	7
Air Force Falcons	7	0	14	14	35

=== VMI ===
	1	2	3	4	Total
VMI Keydets	0	0	10	7	17
Army Black Knights	7	3	6	6	22

=== North Texas ===
	1	2	3	4	Total
North Texas Mean Green	7	0	0	6	13
Army Black Knights	0	3	7	7	17

=== Vs. Navy ===
Army Black Knights (5–6) vs. Navy Midshipmen (8–4)

Quarter	1	2	3	4	Total
Army	3	0	0	0	3
Navy	0	0	10	7	17

at Lincoln Financial Field, Philadelphia, Pennsylvania

- Date: December 12
- Game time: 2:30 p.m. EST
- Game weather: Sunny, 39 °F (4 °C)
- Game attendance: 69,541
- Referee: Brad Allen
- TV: CBS
- Box Score

Game information

First quarter

- ARMY – Alex Carlton 25-yard field goal, 0:00. Army 3–0. Drive: 4 plays, 6 yards, 1:19.

Second quarter

- No scoring

Third quarter

- NAVY – Marcus Curry 25-yard pass from Ricky Dobbs (Joe Buckley kick), 8:55. Navy 7–3. Drive: 11 plays, 68 yards, 6:05.
- NAVY – Joe Buckley 36-yard field goal, 0:11. Navy 10–3. Drive: 12 plays, 55 yards, 6:54.

Fourth quarter

- NAVY – Ricky Dobbs 1-yard run (Joe Buckley kick), 6:15. Navy 17–3. Drive: 4 plays, 12 yards, 1:56.

Top passers

- ARMY – Trent Steelman – 7/20, 77 yards, INT
- NAVY – Ricky Dobbs – 3/7, 61 yards, TD, INT

Top rushers

- ARMY – Patrick Mealy – 13 rushes, 48 yards
- NAVY – Ricky Dobbs – 33 rushes, 116 yards, TD

Top receivers

- ARMY – Ali Villanueva – 5 receptions, 62 yards
- NAVY – Marcus Curry – 1 reception, 25 yards, TD

The loss knocked Army out of a bowl bid.

== Roster ==
2009 Army Black Knights football team roster
Players
Coaches
Offense

Pos.	#	Name	Class
QB		Trent Steelman
TE		Ali Villanueva

Defense

Pos.	#	Name	Class
LB		Josh McNary	Jr
LB		Andrew Rodriguez

Special teams

Pos.	#	Name	Class
K		Alex Carlton

Head coach

- Rich Ellerson

Coordinators/assistant coaches

- John Brock (Rover/B-Squad/Dir. of player personnel)
- Tony Coaxum (CB)
- Brett Gerch (Str.)
- Andy Guyader (WR)
- Capt. Clarence Holmes (DT)
- Robert Lyles (Whips)
- Gene McKeehan (AHC/OG/C)
- John Mumford (DE)
- Joe Ross (FB/ST)
- Payam Saadat (Co-DC/LB)
- Ian Shields (OC/QB)
- Chris Smeland (Co-DC/S)
- Scott Swanson (Str + Cond)
- Bill Tripp (OT)
- Tucker Waugh (Rec. Coord./SB)

Legend

- (C) Team captain
- (S) Suspended
- (I) Ineligible
- Injured
- Redshirt

Roster
