= 2009 Missouri Tigers football team =

American college football season

2009 Missouri Tigers football

Texas Bowl, L 13–35 vs. Navy
- Conference: Big 12 Conference
- North Division
- Record: 8–5 (4–4 Big 12)
- Head coach: Gary Pinkel (9th season)
- Offensive coordinator: David Yost (1st season)
- Offensive scheme: Spread
- Defensive coordinator: Dave Steckel (1st season)
- Base defense: 4–3
- Captains: Danario Alexander; Jaron Baston; Kurtis Gregory; Sean Weatherspoon
- Home stadium: Faurot Field (Capacity: 71,004)

Uniform

2009 Big 12 Conference football standings
	Conf.			Overall
Team	W		L	W		L
North Division
No. 14 Nebraska x	6	–	2	10	–	4
Missouri	4	–	4	8	–	5
Kansas State	4	–	4	6	–	6
Iowa State	3	–	5	7	–	6
Colorado	2	–	6	3	–	9
Kansas	1	–	7	5	–	7
South Division
No. 2 Texas x$	8	–	0	13	–	1
Oklahoma State	6	–	2	9	–	4
No. 21 Texas Tech	5	–	3	9	–	4
Oklahoma	5	–	3	8	–	5
Texas A&M	3	–	5	6	–	7
Baylor	1	–	7	4	–	8
Championship: Texas 13, Nebraska 12
$ – BCS representative as conference champion; x – Division champion/co-champions; Rankings from AP Poll

The 2009 Missouri Tigers football team, represented the University of Missouri in the 2009 NCAA Division I FBS football season. The team was coached by Gary Pinkel, who returned for his ninth season with Mizzou, and played their home games at Faurot Field at Memorial Stadium. Changes to Memorial Stadium for the 2009 season included a new scoreboard and expanded seating capacity following a reconfiguration of the student seating section.

On December 6, the Texas Bowl picked the 8-4 Tigers to play in their fourth annual game against the 9-4 Navy Midshipmen at Reliant Stadium in Houston on December 31.

On December 22, Mizzou Sports Properties (owned by Learfield Sports) announced a contract for a new radio home on all its coaches' and daily shows for five years, starting with the 2010–11 season. KFRU, owned by Cumulus Media, had the radio rights for the Tiger Network.

== Recruits ==
Key Losses:

- DB Castine Bridges
- LB Brock Christopher
- TE Chase Coffman
- QB Chase Daniel
- TB Jimmy Jackson
- WR Jeremy Maclin
- S William Moore
- DL Stryker Sulak
- DB Tremane Vaughns
- K Jeff Wolfert
- DL Ziggy Hood

23 seniors (not incl. Jeremy Maclin) played their final game in the Alamo Bowl.

25 student-athletes signed a National Letter of Intent to attend the University of Missouri and play football for the Tigers in 2009.

Missouri and Coach Pinkel said they were pleased with its recruits, and Pinkel doesn't listen to how the recruiting services rank his recruits (Scout.com as 38th, Rivals.com as 41st) since they have had great results in the evaluations they look for in the athletes recruited. This year, the breakdown by position in the 25-man class was: five DBs, four LBs, four OLs, four DLs, two QBs, three WRs, two TEs, and one RB. Ten of the 25 are native Missourians. Pinkel said regarding Missouri's evaluation system: "I was at a national convention and a couple coaches from Texas said to me that we ask more about players, were more thorough, than any coaches that they've seen and any program that they've seen." The recruiting class breaks down to 14 on defense compared to 11 on offense.

College recruiting
Name	Hometown	School	Height	Weight	40^{‡}	Commit date
Tavon Bolden; DB / S	Houston, Texas	Aldine HS	6 ft 1.5 in (1.87 m)	195 lb (88 kg)	4.50	Jan 17, 2009
Tavon Bolden; DB / S	Recruit ratings: Scout: Rivals: (77)					
Donavan Bonner; DB / FS	Dallas, Texas	H Grady Spruce HS	6 ft 2 in (1.88 m)	217 lb (98 kg)	4.6	Jan 19, 2009
Donavan Bonner; DB / FS	Recruit ratings: Scout: Rivals: (73)					
Justin Britt; OT	Lebanon, Missouri	Plainview HS	6 ft 5 in (1.96 m)	267 lb (121 kg)	4.95	Jun 16, 2008
Justin Britt; OT	Recruit ratings: Scout: Rivals: (75)					
Brayden Burnett; DE	Southlake, Texas	Carroll HS	6 ft 3 in (1.91 m)	240 lb (110 kg)	4.65	Jun 15, 2008
Brayden Burnett; DE	Recruit ratings: Scout: Rivals: (73)					
Adam Burton; MLB	Lee's Summit, Missouri	Lee's Summit West HS	6 ft 1 in (1.85 m)	228 lb (103 kg)	4.61	Jun 9, 2008
Adam Burton; MLB	Recruit ratings: Scout: Rivals: (76)					
Jaleel Clark; WR	Allentown, Pennsylvania	Parkland HS	6 ft 3.5 in (1.92 m)	196 lb (89 kg)	4.50	Aug 11, 2008
Jaleel Clark; WR	Recruit ratings: Scout: Rivals: (78)					
Blaine Dalton; QB	Blue Springs, Missouri	South HS	6 ft 1 in (1.85 m)	190 lb (86 kg)	4.55	Oct 20, 2007
Blaine Dalton; QB	Recruit ratings: Scout: Rivals: (75)					
Marvin Foster; DE	Ft. Worth, Texas	North Crowley HS	6 ft 2 in (1.88 m)	266 lb (121 kg)	N/A	Jun 25, 2008
Marvin Foster; DE	Recruit ratings: Scout: Rivals: (70)					
Chris Freeman; OT	Trotwood, Ohio	Madison HS	6 ft 8 in (2.03 m)	337 lb (153 kg)	5.2	Feb 4, 2009
Chris Freeman; OT	Recruit ratings: Scout: Rivals: (77)					
Ashton Glaser; QB	Springdale, Arkansas	Springdale HS	6 ft 2 in (1.88 m)	205 lb (93 kg)	4.62	Jun 26, 2008
Ashton Glaser; QB	Recruit ratings: Scout: Rivals: (76)					
Jarrell Harrison; DB / S	Las Vegas, Nevada	Palo Verde HS / CC of San Francisco, California	6 ft 2 in (1.88 m)	210 lb (95 kg)	4.50	Dec 16, 2008
Jarrell Harrison; DB / S	Recruit ratings: Scout: Rivals: (0)					
Mark Hill; DE	Branson, Missouri	Branson HS	6 ft 6 in (1.98 m)	262 lb (119 kg)	N/A	Jan 18, 2009
Mark Hill; DE	Recruit ratings: Scout: Rivals: (40)					
Kendial Lawrence; RB	Rockwall, Texas	Rockwall-Heath HS	5 ft 9.5 in (1.77 m)	177 lb (80 kg)	4.43	Jan 18, 2009
Kendial Lawrence; RB	Recruit ratings: Scout: Rivals: (76)					
Jack Meiners; OT	St. Louis, Missouri	Chaminade College Prep HS	6 ft 6 in (1.98 m)	312 lb (142 kg)	5.17	Apr 20, 2008
Jack Meiners; OT	Recruit ratings: Scout: Rivals: (78)					
T.J. Moe; S	O'Fallon, Missouri	Fort Zumwalt West HS	6 ft 0 in (1.83 m)	182 lb (83 kg)	4.50	Jun 2, 2008
T.J. Moe; S	Recruit ratings: Scout: Rivals: (76)					
Ty Phillips; DT	East St. Louis, Illinois	East St. Louis Senior HS	6 ft 2.5 in (1.89 m)	257 lb (117 kg)	4.90	Dec 28, 2008
Ty Phillips; DT	Recruit ratings: Scout: Rivals: (40)					
Sheldon Richardson; DT / TE	St. Louis, Missouri	Gateway HS	6 ft 4 in (1.93 m)	281 lb (127 kg)	4.71	Feb 4, 2009
Sheldon Richardson; DT / TE	Recruit ratings: Scout: Rivals: (81)					
Michael Sam; DE (weakside)	Hitchcock, Texas	Hitchcock HS	6 ft 2.5 in (1.89 m)	223 lb (101 kg)	4.60	Jan 31, 2009
Michael Sam; DE (weakside)	Recruit ratings: Scout: Rivals: (76)					
Alex Sanders; TE / WR	Springfield, Missouri	Glendale HS	6 ft 4.5 in (1.94 m)	205 lb (93 kg)	N/A	Jun 6, 2008
Alex Sanders; TE / WR	Recruit ratings: Scout: Rivals: (76)					
Jasper Simmons; DB / S	Pensacola, Florida	Washington HS / Hutchinson C.C., Kansas	6 ft 1 in (1.85 m)	210 lb (95 kg)	4.47	Sep 29, 2008
Jasper Simmons; DB / S	Recruit ratings: Scout: Rivals: (0)					
Kerwin Stricker; WR	Washington, Missouri	Washington HS	6 ft 1 in (1.85 m)	190 lb (86 kg)	N/A	Feb 23, 2008
Kerwin Stricker; WR	Recruit ratings: Scout: Rivals: (76)					
Joshua Tatum; MLB	Oakland, California	McClymonds HS / CC of San Francisco, California	6 ft 0 in (1.83 m)	240 lb (110 kg)	4.44	Dec 8, 2008
Joshua Tatum; MLB	Recruit ratings: Scout: Rivals: (0)					
L'Damian Washington; WR	Shreveport, Louisiana	Green Oaks HS	6 ft 4 in (1.93 m)	182 lb (83 kg)	4.50	Jan 31, 2009
L'Damian Washington; WR	Recruit ratings: Scout: Rivals: (40)					
Matt White; DB / S	Dallas, Texas	Keller HS	6 ft 0.5 in (1.84 m)	170 lb (77 kg)	4.50	Jan 17, 2009
Matt White; DB / S	Recruit ratings: Scout: Rivals: (40)					
Andrew Wilson; MLB	Peculiar, Missouri	Raymore-Peculiar Sr. HS	6 ft 4 in (1.93 m)	227 lb (103 kg)	4.70	Mar 1, 2008
Andrew Wilson; MLB	Recruit ratings: Scout: Rivals: (75)					
Overall recruit ranking: Scout: 38 Rivals: 41
‡ Refers to 40-yard dash; Note: In many cases, Scout, Rivals, 247Sports, On3, and ESPN may conflict in their listings of height, weight and 40 time.; In these cases, the average was taken. ESPN grades are on a 100-point scale.; Sources: "Missouri 2009 Football Commitments". Rivals.; "2009 Missouri Commits". Scout.; "2009 Player Commitments – Missouri". ESPN.; "Scout.com Team Recruiting Rankings". Scout.; "2009 Team Ranking". Rivals.com.

== Schedule ==
Date	Time	Opponent	Rank	Site	TV	Result	Attendance	Source
September 5	2:30 pm	vs. Illinois*		Edward Jones Dome; St. Louis, MO (Arch Rivalry)	ESPN	W 37–9	64,215	
September 12	6:00 pm	Bowling Green*	No. 25	Faurot Field; Columbia, Missouri	FSN PPV	W 27–20	65,401	
September 19	1:00 pm	Furman*		Faurot Field; Columbia, Missouri	FSN PPV	W 52–12	61,617	
September 25	8:00 pm	at Nevada*		Mackay Stadium; Reno, NV	ESPN	W 31–21	18,269	
October 8	8:00 pm	No. 21 Nebraska	No. 24	Faurot Field; Columbia, MO (rivalry)	ESPN	L 12–27	65,826	
October 17	8:15 pm	at No. 16 Oklahoma State		Boone Pickens Stadium; Stillwater, OK	ESPN2	L 17–33	55,752	
October 24	7:00 pm	No. 3 Texas^{†}		Faurot Field; Columbia, MO	ABC	L 7–41	71,004	
October 31	12:30 pm	at Colorado		Folsom Field; Boulder, CO	FSN	W 36–17	45,634	
November 7	1:00 pm	Baylor		Faurot Field; Columbia, MO		L 32–40	65,298	
November 14	11:30 am	at Kansas State		Bill Snyder Family Football Stadium; Manhattan, KS	Versus	W 38–12	46,476	
November 21	1:00 pm	Iowa State		Faurot Field; Columbia, MO (rivalry)		W 34–24	55,573	
November 28	2:30 pm	vs. Kansas		Arrowhead Stadium; Kansas City, MO (Border War)	ABC	W 41–39	70,072	
December 31	2:30 pm	vs. Navy*		Reliant Stadium; Houston, TX (Texas Bowl)	ESPN	L 13–35	69,441	
*Non-conference game; ^{†}Homecoming; Rankings from AP Poll released prior to the game; All times are in Central time

== Game summaries ==
=== Illinois ===
	1	2	3	4	Total
Illinois	0	3	0	6	9
Missouri	10	6	14	7	37

Blaine Gabbert passed for three touchdowns and 319 yards (25–33), in a runaway 37–9 victory over rival Illinois. Missouri WR Danario Alexander posted a career-high with 10 receptions totaling 132 yards. Gabbert became the third straight Missouri quarterback to earn Big 12 Player of the Week honors in his first start.

=== Bowling Green ===
	1	2	3	4	Total
Bowling Green	10	3	7	0	20
#25/– Missouri	0	6	7	14	27

After trailing most of the game, Missouri scored 21 unanswered points in the second half to escape at home.

=== Furman ===
	1	2	3	4	Total
Furman	0	0	6	6	12
#–/25 Missouri	14	28	7	3	52

=== Nevada ===
	1	2	3	4	Total
#–/21 Missouri	6	6	9	10	31
Nevada	7	0	6	8	21

Missouri quarterback Blaine Gabbert posted a career-high 414 yards on 25 of 40 passing. Missouri wide-out Danario Alexander once again posted career high numbers with 9 catches for 170 yards and 2 touchdowns. The turning point in this game was when Nevada running back Luke Lippincott fumbled on the Missouri 4 yard line, setting up a 96-yard touchdown drive by the Missouri offense.

=== Nebraska ===
	1	2	3	4	Total
#21/22 Nebraska	0	0	0	27	27
#24/18 Missouri	0	9	3	0	12

Game in the rain ends with a dramatic switch from a 12–0 Missouri lead after the 3rd quarter, changed to a 27–12 loss with an injured Blaine Gabbert's leg for the final half with the first two interceptions of his career.

=== Oklahoma State ===
	1	2	3	4	Total
#–/24 Missouri	3	14	0	0	17
#16/14 Oklahoma State	7	17	3	6	33

=== Texas ===
	1	2	3	4	Total
#3/3 Texas	21	14	3	3	41
Missouri	0	7	0	0	7

Kickoff time: 7:12 pm • End of Game: 10:02 • Total elapsed time: 2:50 Referee: Tom Walker • Umpire: John Mascarello • Linesman: Chad Green • Line judge: David Oliver • Back judge: Brad Van Vark • Field judge: Reggie Smith • Side judge: Brad Horchem • Scorer: Tim Knaar • Temperature: 56 F • Wind: S 5 • Weather: Cool and clear

=== Colorado ===
	1	2	3	4	Total
Missouri	21	12	0	3	36
Colorado	0	3	14	0	17

=== Baylor ===
	1	2	3	4	Total
Baylor	9	7	10	14	40
Missouri	7	20	2	3	32

=== Kansas State ===
	1	2	3	4	Total
Missouri	3	14	7	14	38
Kansas State	3	3	6	0	12

=== Iowa State ===
	1	2	3	4	Total
Iowa State	7	10	7	0	24
Missouri	10	0	14	10	34

=== Kansas ===
	1	2	3	4	Total
Missouri	3	10	20	8	41
Kansas	14	7	7	11	39

Missouri tackled the quarterback for a safety with 2:39 remaining and Grant Ressel hit a 27-yard field goal, his fourth of the game, as time expired, giving the Tigers a 41–39 win over Kansas on Saturday in another wild Border Showdown at Arrowhead Stadium.

Ressel was subsequently named the Big 12 Conference Special Teams Player of the Week, for his perfect day (4-for-4) in field goal kicking. It was the first time since 1972 that a Missouri team has won a game from a field goal kicker after trailing in the final seconds of a game.

=== Navy (Texas Bowl) ===
The Tigers lost to Navy in the worst bowl defeat (in terms of the point differential, -22), in team history.

	1	2	3	4	Total
Navy	7	7	7	14	35
Missouri	7	3	0	3	13

== Personnel ==
=== Coaching staff ===
Name	Position	Years at MU	Alma mater (Year)
Gary Pinkel	Head coach	9	Kent State (1975)
David Yost	Assistant head coach Offensive coordinator Quarterbacks coach	9	Kent State (1992)
Dave Steckel	Linebackers; Defensive coordinator	9	Kutztown (1982)
Barry Odom	Safeties	7	University of Missouri (1999)
Cornell Ford	Cornerbacks	9	Toledo (1991)
Andy Hill	Wide Receivers; Tight ends	14	University of Missouri (1985)
Brian Jones	Running backs	9	Connecticut (1981)
Craig Kuligowski	Defensive line	9	Toledo (1991)
Bruce Walker	Co-offensive line	9	Central Washington (1983)
Josh Henson	Co-offensive line	1	Oklahoma State (1998)
Dan Hopkins	Director of football operations	3	University of Missouri (2004)
Nick Otterbacher	Director of football recruiting	6	Toledo (2002)

On February 20, 2009, defensive coordinator Matt Eberflus announced he was leaving the Tigers to join the Cleveland Browns.

=== Roster ===
2009 Missouri Tigers roster (as of 8/29/09 MUTIGERS.com)
Wide receivers: 2 LaRoderick Thomas – Junior; 2 L'Damian Washington – Freshman; 3 Gahn McGaffie – '' (redshirt) Freshman; 4 Jared Perry – Senior; 5 Rolandis Woodland – (redshirt) Freshman; 6 T. J. Moe – Freshman; 8 Wes Kemp – Sophomore; 9 Kerwin Stricker – Freshman; 14 Jaleel Clark – Freshman; 16 Brandon Gerau – Freshman; 29 Jerrell Jackson – Sophomore; 34 Gregory Andi – (redshirt) Freshman; 46 Curt Roth – (redshirt) Freshman; 80 Terry Dennis – Sophomore; 81 Danario Alexander – Senior; 88 Forrest Shock – Junior; Offensive line: 53 Travis Ruth – (redshirt) Freshman; 55 Daniel Jenkins – (redshirt) Freshman; 56 John Birdwell – (redshirt) Freshman; 61 Max Copeland – Freshman; 62 Tim Barnes – Junior; 63 Ryan Schleusner – Senior; 64 Mike Cecero – (redshirt) Freshman; 65 Mike Prince – (redshirt) Junior; 66 Austin Wuebbels – (redshirt) Sophomore; 67 J. T. Beasley – Sophomore; 68 Justin Britt – Freshman; 69 Shawn Carey – Freshman; 70 Chris Freeman – Freshman; 71 Jayson Palmgren – (redshirt) Sophomore; 72 Elvis Fisher – Sophomore; 73 Mark Hill – Freshman; 74 Kirk Lakebrink – Junior; 75 Jack Meiners – Freshman; 76 Quinn Brown – Sophomore; 77 Dan Hoch – Sophomore; 78 Kurtis Gregory – (redshirt) Junior GS; 79 Taylor Davis – (redshirt) Freshman; Tight ends: 17 Marvin Norman – (redshirt) Sophomore; 33 Levi Hamilton – Senior; 43 Jon Gissinger – Senior; 49 Chris Willett – (redshirt) Freshman; 82 Michael Egnew – Sophomore; 84 Alex Sanders – Freshman; 86 Beau Brinkley – Sophomore; 87 Andrew Jones – Sophomore; 93 Andy Loyd – Junior	Quarterbacks: 11 Blaine Gabbert – Sophomore; 12 Jimmy Costello – Sophomore; 14 Owen Lenander – Freshman; 16 Ashton Glaser – Freshman; Running (Tail) backs: 10 Gilbert Moye – (redshirt) Sophomore; 24 Derrick Washington – Junior; 26 De'Vion Moore – (redshirt) Sophomore; 30 Kendial Lawrence – Freshman; 31 Nikko Sansone – Freshman; 35 Matt Davis – Junior; 38 Jared Culver – (redshirt) Freshman; Defensive line: 2 Brian Coulter (End) – Senior; 3 Jacquies Smith – Sophomore; 18 Marcus Malbrough – (redshirt) Freshman; 38 Chris Earnhardt – Sophomore; 51 Gabe McCrary – Freshman; 57 Brad Madison – (redshirt) Freshman; 58 Brendan Donaldson – Sophomore; 85 Aldon Smith – (redshirt) Freshman; 90 Dominique Hamilton – Sophomore; 91 Jimmy Burge – (redshirt) Freshman; 92 Andy Maples – Senior; 93 Terrell Resonno – (redshirt) Sophomore; 94 Marvin Foster – Freshman; 95 Brayden Burnett – Freshman; 96 Jaron Baston – Senior; 98 Bart Coslet – Junior; 99 George White – (redshirt) Freshman; Linebackers: 5 Josh Tatum – Junior; 6 Andrew Gachkar – Junior; 8 Donovan Bonner – Freshman; 9 Tavon Bolden – Freshman; 12 Sean Weatherspoon – Senior; 32 Dustin Hobbs – Freshman; 33 Luke Lambert – Junior; 35 Jeff Gettys – Junior; 39 Tyler Crane – Sophomore; 47 Adam Burton – Freshman; 48 Andrew Wilson – Freshman; 50 Daniel Schatz – Freshman; 52 Michael Sam – Freshman; 84 Joe Plevel – (redshirt) Freshman; 49 Terrance Jackson - Junior; 97 Michael Brennan – Freshman	Safety: 4 Hardy Ricks – Senior; 10 Jasper Simmons – Junior; 11 Jarrell Harrison – Junior; 15 Del Howard – Senior; 17 Matt White – Freshman; 20 Charles Brockway – (redshirt) Freshman; 25 Zaviar Gooden – (redshirt) Freshman; 34 John Moore – (redshirt) Freshman; 40 Terrell Lloyd – Junior; 88 Byron Smith – Sophomore; Strong Safety Free Safety Defensive backs: 1 Kip Edwards – (redshirt) Freshman; 7 Munir Prince – (redshirt) Junior; 13 Kenji Jackson – Sophomore; 19 Carl Gettis – Junior; 20 Kevin Rutland – (redshirt) Junior; 22 Robert Steeples – (redshirt) Freshman; 26 Ryan Evans – Sophomore; 28 Randy Ponder – Freshman; 31 Trey Hobson – Sophomore; 41 Winston Wright – Freshman; 43 Tony Buhr – Sophomore; 45 Tyler Davis – Freshman; Punters: 36 Jake Harry IV – Senior; 95 Grant Ressel – (redshirt) Sophomore; 99 Matt Grabner – Sophomore; Kickers: 91 Tanner Mills – Senior; 95 Grant Ressel – (redshirt) Sophomore; 97 Trey Barrow – (redshirt) Freshman
† Starter at position

== Statistics ==
Statistics from: "Missouri Tigers – Cumulative Season Statistics". CSTV.com. January 2, 2010. Archived from the original on July 21, 2011.

=== Scores by quarter ===
(through December 31, 2009)

	1	2	3	4	Total
Missouri	84	135	83	75	377
Opponents	85	74	76	95	330

=== Team ===
(to December 31, 2009)

	MU	Opp
SCORING	377	330
Points per game	29.0	25.4
FIRST DOWNS	268	264
Rushing	102	110
Passing	142	137
Penalty	24	17
RUSHING YARDAGE	1,651	1,542
Gained	1,994	1,927
Lost	-343	-385
Attempts	444	463
Avg per rush	3.7	3.3
Avg per game	127.0	118.6
TDs Rushing	15	17
PASSING YARDAGE	3,711	3,269
Comp-Att-Int	274-467-11	305-475-8
Avg per Pass	7.9	6.9
Avg per Catch	13.5	10.7
Avg per game	285.5	251.5
TDs Passing	26	20

	MU	Opp
TOTAL OFFENSE	5,362	4,811
Total plays	911	938
Avg per play	5.9	5.1
Avg per game	412.5	370.1
Kick Returns	63-1,315	67-1,505
Punt Returns	25-238	20-57
Inter. Returns	8-102	11-231
Kick Return Ave.	20.9	22.5
Punt Return Ave.	9.5	2.8
Inter. Return Ave.	12.8	21.0
Fumbles-Lost	18-8	24-15
Penalties-Yards	69-716	91-754
Avg per game	55.1	58.0
Punts-Yards	63-2,647	63-2,525
Avg per punt	42.0	40.1
Net punt avg	40.5	35.3
Time of possession/Game	27:44	32:16
3rd down conversions	68/185 (37%)	86/201 (43%)
4th down conversions	11/20 (55%)	8/20 (40%)
Sacks by-Yards	31-244	20-191
Misc. Yards	0	0
Touchdowns scored	42	40
Field goals-Attempts	26-27 (96%)	18-19 (95%)
On-Side Kicks	0-0	0-0
Red-Zone Scores	41-50 (82%)	45-52 (87%)
Red-Zone TDs	21-50 (42%)	31-52 (60%)
PAT-Attempts	39-39 (100%)	32-35 (91%)
ATTENDANCE	384,719	166,131
Games / Avg per Game	6 / 64,120	4 / 41,533
Neutral Site		3 / 67,909

=== Offense ===
==== Rushing ====
(to December 31, 2009)

Name	GP-GS	Att	Gain	Loss	Net	Avg	TD	Long	Avg/G
Derrick Washington	13	190	909	-44	865	4.6	10	42	66.5
De'Vion Moore	11	63	272	-14	258	4.1	1	31	23.5
Kendial Lawrence	11	52	236	-17	219	4.2	0	22	19.9
Blaine Gabbert	13	103	426	-222	204	2.0	3	40	15.7
Jerrell Jackson	13	11	96	-4	92	8.4	1	37	7.1
Gilbert Moye	11	6	36	-1	35	5.8	0	17	3.2
Danario Alexander	13	1	10	0	10	10.0	0	10	0.8
Jared Perry	11	2	7	0	7	3.5	0	5	0.6
Jimmy Costello	3	2	0	-6	-6	-3.0	0	0	-2.0
TEAM	12	14	2	-35	-33	-2.4	0	2	-2.8
TOTAL	13	444	1,994	-343	1,651	3.7	15	42	127.0
Opponents	13	463	1,927	-385	1,542	3.3	17	41	118.6

==== Passing ====
(to December 31, 2009)

Name (G)	Effic	Cmp-Att-Int	Pct	Yds	TD	Lng	Avg/G
Blaine Gabbert (13)	140.45	262-445-9	58.9	3,593	24	84	276.4
Jimmy Costello (3)	61.04	9-17-2	52.9	64	0	16	21.3
Danario Alexander (13)	383.00	1-2-0	50.0	40	1	40	3.1
TEAM (12)	0.00	0-1-0	0.0	0	0	0	0.0
Forrest Shock (12)	631.60	1-1-0	100.0	24	1	24	2.0
Derrick Washington (13)	16.00	1-1-0	100.0	-10	0	0	-0.8
TOTAL (13)	139.08	274-467-11	58.7	3,711	26	84	285.5
Opponents (13)	132.55	305-475-8	64.2	3,269	20	74	251.5

==== Receiving ====
(to December 31, 2009)

Name	GP	No.	Yds	Avg	TD	Long	Avg/G
Danario Alexander	13	113	1,781	15.8	14	84	137.0
Jared Perry	11	46	696	15.1	6	48	63.3
Jerrell Jackson	13	37	458	12.4	2	70	35.2
Derrick Washington	13	26	156	6.0	0	36	12.0
Wes Kemp	13	23	418	18.2	3	56	32.2
Andrew Jones	13	8	43	5.4	0	11	3.3
Rolandis Woodland	8	5	26	5.2	0	8	3.2
Kendial Lawrence	11	3	49	16.3	0	33	4.5
Michael Egnew	12	3	25	8.3	0	11	2.1
De'Vion Moore	11	3	13	4.3	0	12	1.2
Brandon Gerau	13	2	19	9.5	0	14	1.5
T.J. Moe	10	2	8	4.0	0	4	0.8
Jaquies Smith	13	1	24	24.0	1	24	1.8
Gilbert Moye	11	1	5	5.0	0	5	0.5
Blaine Gabbert	13	1	-10	-10.0	0	0	-0.8
TOTAL	13	274	3,711	13.5	26	84	285.5
Opponents	13	305	3,269	10.7	20	74	251.5

=== Field Goals/PAT ===
(to December 31, 2009)

Name	FG-FGA	Pct	01-19	20-29	30-39	40-49	50-99	Lng	Blkd	PAT	Pts.
Grant Ressel	26-27	96.3	0-0	9-9	10-10	7-8	0-0	46	0	39-39	117

=== Special teams ===
(to December 31, 2009)

Name	Punting								Kickoffs				
Name	No.	Yds	Avg	Long	TB	FC	I20	Blkd	No.	Yds	Avg	TB	OB
Jake Harry	61	2,609	42.8	69	2	15	23	0					
Matt Grabner	1	38	38.0	38	0	0	1	0					
TEAM	1	0	0.0	0	0	0	0	1					
Tanner Mills									64	3,924	61.3	8	1
Grant Ressel									14	898	64.1	1	1
TOTAL	63	2,647	42.0	69	2	15	24	1	78	4,822	61.8	9	2
Opponents	63	2,525	40.1	60	3	20	23	0	75	4,763	63.5	10	2

Name	Punt returns					Kick returns				
Name	No.	Yds	Avg	TD	Long	No.	Yds	Avg	TD	Long
Carl Gettis	22	156	7.1	0	27	1	18	18.0	0	18
Brandon Gerau	3	22	7.3	0	11					
Jasper Simmons	0	60	0.0	0	60	36	815	22.6	0	34
Kendial Lawrence						12	218	18.2	0	32
Wes Kemp						6	136	22.7	0	33
Jerrell Jackson						3	53	17.7	0	21
Munir Prince						3	65	21.7	0	30
Trey Hobson						1	8	8.0	0	8
Jon Gissinger						1	2	2.0	0	2
TOTAL	25	238	9.5	0	60	63	1,315	20.9	0	34
Opponents	20	57	2.8	1	13	67	1,505	22.5	0	53

=== Interceptions ===
(to December 31, 2009)

Name	No.	Yds	Avg	TD	Long
Kevin Rutland	2	0	0.0	0	0
Jacquies Smith	1	43	43.0	1	43
Jerrell Harrison	1	27	27.0	0	27
Hardy Ricks	1	16	16.0	0	16
Kip Edwards	1	10	10.0	0	10
Sean Weatherspoon	1	6	6.0	0	6
Jasper Simmons	1	0	0.0	0	0
TOTAL	8	102	12.8	1	43
Opponents	11	231	21.0	2	78

=== Fumble returns ===
(to December 31, 2009)

Name	No.	Yds	Avg	TD	Long
Carl Gettis	1	20	20.0	0	20
Jasper Simmons	1	8	8.0	0	8
Zaviar Gooden	1	1	1.0	0	1
TOTAL	3	29	9.7	0	20
Opponents	0	0	0.0	0	0

=== Defense ===
(to December 31, 2009)

Name	GP	Tackles				Sacks	Pass defense			Fumbles		Blkd Kick	Saf
Name	GP	Solo	Ast	Total	TFL-Yds	No.-Yds	Int-Yds.	BrUp	QBH	Rcv-Yds	FF	Blkd Kick	Saf
Sean Weatherspoon	13	76	35	111	14.5-44	4.5-21	1-6	2	1	-	1	-	-
TOTALS	13	633	305	938	81-377	31-244	8-102	34	8	15-29	13	1	4
Opponents	13	540	373	913	76-326	20-191	11-231	53	14	8- 0	12	1	-

== Rankings ==
(as of January 7, 2010)

Ranking movements Legend: ██ Increase in ranking ██ Decrease in ranking — = Not ranked
	Week																
Poll	Pre	1	2	3	4	5	6	7	8	9	10	11	12	13	14	15	Final
AP	—	25	—	—	—	24	—	—	—	—	—	—	—	—	—	—	—
Coaches	—	—	25	21	23	18	24	—	—	—	—	—	—	—	—	—	—
Harris	Not released				25	23	—	—	—	—	—	—	—	—	—	—	Not released
BCS	Not released								—	—	—	—	—	—	—	—	Not released
