= 2009 NCAA Division I FBS football season =

American college football season

2009 NCAA Division I FBS season
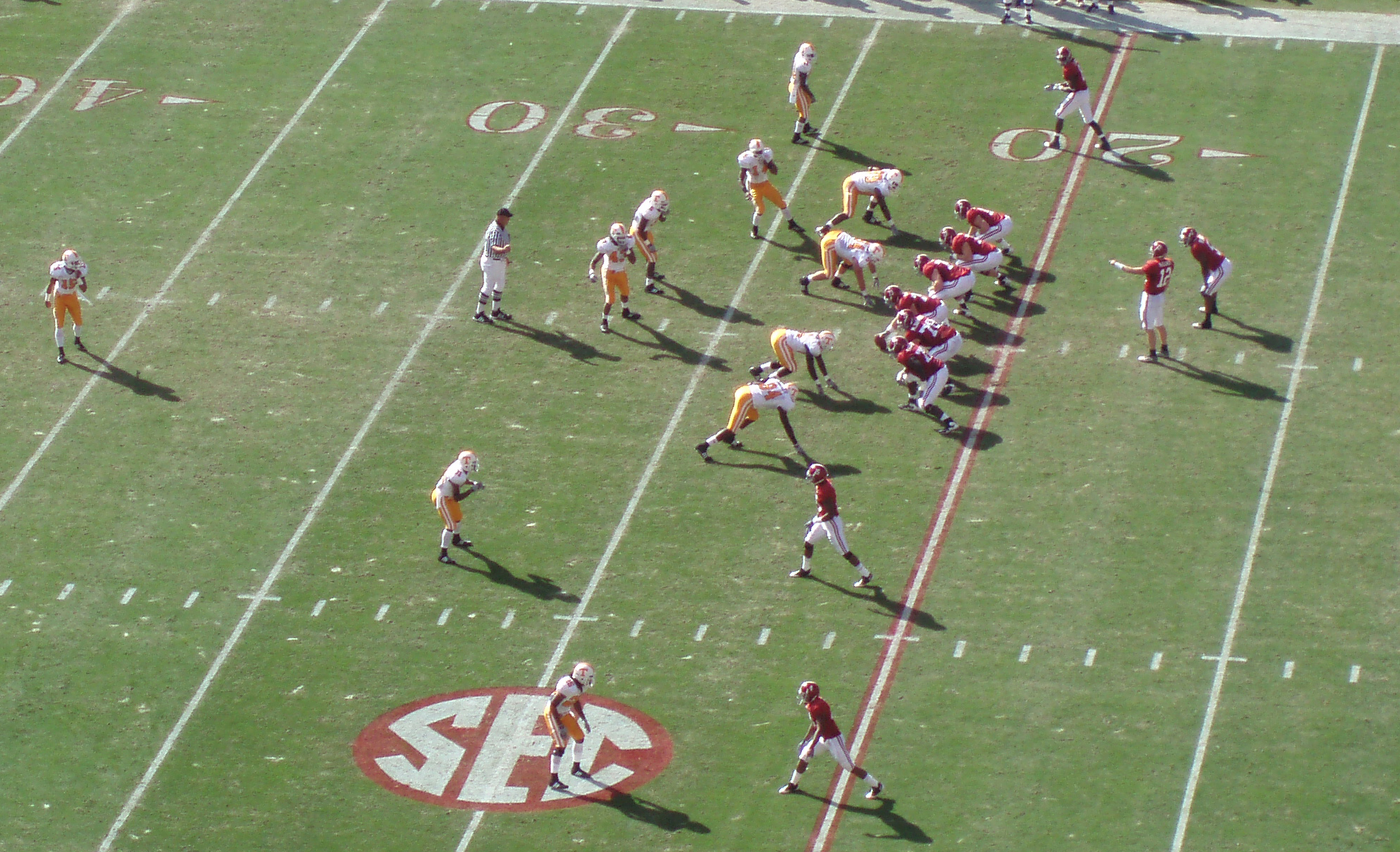
- Alabama v. Tennessee
- Number of teams: 120 (Note: With the addition of Western Kentucky University as a full Division I FBS member in 2009, the total number of teams went from 119 to 120.)
- Duration: September 3 – December 12
- Preseason AP No. 1: Florida

Postseason
- Duration: December 19, 2009 – January 7, 2010
- Bowl games: 34
- Heisman Trophy: Mark Ingram II (running back, Alabama)

Bowl Championship Series
- 2010 BCS Championship Game
- Site: Rose Bowl Stadium; Pasadena, California
- Champion(s): Alabama

NCAA Division I FBS football seasons
- ← 2008 2010 →

The 2009 NCAA Division I FBS football season was the highest level of college football competition in the United States organized by the National Collegiate Athletic Association (NCAA).

The regular season began on September 3, 2009, and ended on December 12, 2009. The postseason concluded on January 7, 2010, with the BCS National Championship Game in Pasadena, California, where the Alabama Crimson Tide defeated the Texas Longhorns by the score of 37–21.

For the first time in the history of the Heisman Trophy, the annual award for the most outstanding player in college football, two previous Heisman winners played in the same season—2008 winner Sam Bradford of Oklahoma and 2007 winner Tim Tebow of Florida. For the first time since 1946, the top three vote-getters from the previous season all returned: Bradford, Colt McCoy of Texas, and Tebow, in that order. Six teams finished the regular season undefeated; a record for the BCS era.

== Rule changes ==
The NCAA football rules committee proposed several rule changes for 2009. The rule changes include:

- If the home team wears colored jerseys, the visiting team may also wear colored jerseys so long as the two teams have agreed to do so. This rule comes as a result of the traditional USC–UCLA game where both teams wore their home uniforms. Previously, the visiting team would be charged a first-half timeout for illegal equipment.
- If the punter carries the ball outside of the tackle box, he is no longer protected under the roughing the kicker penalty.
- Deliberately grabbing the chin strap is now included as part of the face mask penalty.
- The edge of the tackle box is defined as being five yards to the left and right of the snapper, rather than two parallel lines from the position of the offensive tackles.
- Periods will not be extended for plays that result in loss of down (i.e. illegal forward pass).
- If a defensive player is injured, the play clock will be reset to 40 seconds. The play clock will be reset to 25 seconds for an injury to an offensive player.

== Conference changes ==
Western Kentucky joined the Sun Belt Conference after playing the 2008 as an FBS independent, completing their two-year transition from the Football Championship Subdivision (FCS). The number of full FBS members increased to 120.

School	Former conference	New conference
Western Kentucky Hilltoppers	FBS independent	Sun Belt

== New and updated stadiums ==
- Akron opened InfoCision Stadium – Summa Field against Morgan State on September 12, winning 41–0.
- Minnesota christened their new TCF Bank Stadium with a win, defeating Air Force 20–13 on September 12.
- Missouri expanded the capacity of Faurot Field from 68,349 to 71,004.
- Indiana expanded the capacity of Memorial Stadium from 49,225 to 52,929 with the horseshoeing of the North End Zone.

== Regular season top 10 matchups ==
Rankings reflect the AP Poll. Rankings for Week 8 and beyond will list BCS Rankings first and AP Poll second. Teams that failed to be a top 10 team for one poll or the other will be noted.

- Week 1
  - No. 5 Alabama defeated No. 7 Virginia Tech, 34–24 (Georgia Dome, Atlanta, Georgia)
- Week 2
  - No. 3 USC defeated No. 8 Ohio State, 18–15 (Ohio Stadium, Columbus, Ohio)
- Week 6
  - No. 1 Florida defeated No. 4 LSU, 13–3 (Tiger Stadium, Baton Rouge, Louisiana)
- Week 9
  - No. 10/10 Oregon defeated No. 5/4 USC, 47–20 (Autzen Stadium, Eugene, Oregon)
- Week 10
  - No. 3/3 Alabama defeated No. 9/9 LSU, 24–15 (Bryant-Denny Stadium, Tuscaloosa, Alabama)
- Week 14
  - No. 2/2 Alabama defeated No. 1/1 Florida, 32–13 (2009 SEC Championship Game, Georgia Dome, Atlanta, Georgia)

== Conference standings ==
2009 Atlantic Coast Conference football standings
	Conf.			Overall
Team	W		L	W		L
Atlantic Division
No. 24 Clemson x	6	–	2	9	–	5
Boston College	5	–	3	8	–	5
Florida State	4	–	4	7	–	6
Wake Forest	3	–	5	5	–	7
NC State	2	–	6	5	–	7
Maryland	1	–	7	2	–	10
Coastal Division
No. 13 Georgia Tech * x$	7	–	1	11	–	3
No. 10 Virginia Tech	6	–	2	10	–	3
No. 19 Miami (FL)	5	–	3	9	–	4
North Carolina *	0	–	4	0	–	5
Duke	3	–	5	5	–	7
Virginia	2	–	6	3	–	9
Championship: Georgia Tech 39, Clemson 34
$ – BCS representative as conference champion; North Carolina vacated 8 wins, including 4 ACC wins.; Rankings from AP Poll

2009 Big 12 Conference football standings
	Conf.			Overall
Team	W		L	W		L
North Division
No. 14 Nebraska x	6	–	2	10	–	4
Missouri	4	–	4	8	–	5
Kansas State	4	–	4	6	–	6
Iowa State	3	–	5	7	–	6
Colorado	2	–	6	3	–	9
Kansas	1	–	7	5	–	7
South Division
No. 2 Texas x$	8	–	0	13	–	1
Oklahoma State	6	–	2	9	–	4
No. 21 Texas Tech	5	–	3	9	–	4
Oklahoma	5	–	3	8	–	5
Texas A&M	3	–	5	6	–	7
Baylor	1	–	7	4	–	8
Championship: Texas 13, Nebraska 12
$ – BCS representative as conference champion; x – Division champion/co-champions; Rankings from AP Poll

2009 Big East Conference football standings
	Conf.			Overall
Team	W		L	W		L
No. 8 Cincinnati $	7	–	0	12	–	1
No. 25 West Virginia	5	–	2	9	–	4
No. 15 Pittsburgh	5	–	2	10	–	3
Rutgers	3	–	4	9	–	4
Connecticut	3	–	4	8	–	5
South Florida	3	–	4	8	–	5
Louisville	1	–	6	4	–	8
Syracuse	1	–	6	4	–	8
$ – BCS representative as conference champion; Rankings from AP Poll

2009 Big Ten Conference football standings
	Conf.			Overall
Team	W		L	W		L
No. 5 Ohio State $	7	–	1	11	–	2
No. 7 Iowa %	6	–	2	11	–	2
No. 9 Penn State	6	–	2	11	–	2
Northwestern	5	–	3	8	–	5
No. 16 Wisconsin	5	–	3	10	–	3
Michigan State	4	–	4	6	–	7
Purdue	4	–	4	5	–	7
Minnesota	3	–	5	6	–	7
Illinois	2	–	6	3	–	9
Michigan	1	–	7	5	–	7
Indiana	1	–	7	4	–	8
$ – BCS representative as conference champion; % – BCS at-large representative; Rankings from AP Poll

2009 Conference USA football standings
	Conf.			Overall
Team	W		L	W		L
East Division
East Carolina x$	7	–	1	9	–	5
UCF	6	–	2	8	–	5
Southern Miss	5	–	3	7	–	6
Marshall	4	–	4	7	–	6
UAB	4	–	4	5	–	7
Memphis	1	–	7	2	–	10
West Division
Houston xy	6	–	2	10	–	4
SMU x	6	–	2	8	–	5
Tulsa	3	–	5	5	–	7
UTEP	3	–	5	4	–	8
Rice	2	–	6	2	–	10
Tulane	1	–	7	3	–	9
Championship: East Carolina 38, Houston 32
$ – Conference champion; x – Division champion/co-champions; y – Championship game participant; Rankings from AP Poll

2009 Mid-American Conference football standings
	Conf.			Overall
Team	W		L	W		L
East Division
Ohio xy	7	–	1	9	–	5
Temple x	7	–	1	9	–	4
Bowling Green	6	–	2	7	–	6
Kent State	4	–	4	5	–	7
Buffalo	3	–	5	5	–	7
Akron	2	–	6	3	–	9
Miami (OH)	1	–	7	1	–	11
West Division
No. 23 Central Michigan x$	8	–	0	12	–	2
Northern Illinois	5	–	3	7	–	6
Western Michigan	4	–	4	5	–	7
Toledo	3	–	5	5	–	7
Ball State	2	–	6	2	–	10
Eastern Michigan	0	–	8	0	–	12
Championship: Central Michigan 20, Ohio 10
$ – Conference champion; x – Division champion/co-champions; y – Championship game participant; Rankings from AP Poll

2009 Mountain West Conference football standings
	Conf.			Overall
Team	W		L	W		L
No. 6 TCU $	8	–	0	12	–	1
No. 12 BYU	7	–	1	11	–	2
No. 18 Utah	6	–	2	10	–	3
Air Force	5	–	3	8	–	5
Wyoming	4	–	4	7	–	6
UNLV	3	–	5	5	–	7
San Diego State	2	–	6	4	–	8
New Mexico	1	–	7	1	–	11
Colorado State	0	–	8	3	–	9
$ – Conference champion and BCS representative as top non-AQ school to meet automatic qualification criteria; Rankings from AP Poll

2009 Pacific-10 Conference football standings
	Conf.			Overall
Team	W		L	W		L
No. 11 Oregon $	8	–	1	10	–	3
Arizona	6	–	3	8	–	5
Oregon State	6	–	3	8	–	5
Stanford	6	–	3	8	–	5
No. 22 USC	5	–	4	9	–	4
California	5	–	4	8	–	5
Washington	4	–	5	5	–	7
UCLA	3	–	6	7	–	6
Arizona State	2	–	7	4	–	8
Washington State	0	–	9	1	–	11
$ – BCS representative as conference champion; Rankings from AP Poll

2009 Southeastern Conference football standings
	Conf.			Overall
Team	W		L	W		L
Eastern Division
No. 3 Florida x%	8	–	0	13	–	1
Georgia	4	–	4	8	–	5
Tennessee	4	–	4	7	–	6
Kentucky	3	–	5	7	–	6
South Carolina	3	–	5	7	–	6
Vanderbilt	0	–	8	2	–	10
Western Division
No. 1 Alabama x$#	8	–	0	14	–	0
No. 17 LSU	5	–	3	9	–	4
No. 20 Ole Miss	4	–	4	9	–	4
Arkansas	3	–	5	8	–	5
Auburn	3	–	5	8	–	5
Mississippi State	3	–	5	5	–	7
Championship: Alabama 32, Florida 13
# – BCS National Champion; $ – BCS representative as conference champion; % – BCS at-large representative; x – Division champion/co-champions; Rankings from AP Poll

2009 Sun Belt Conference football standings
	Conf.			Overall
Team	W		L	W		L
Troy $	8	–	0	9	–	4
Middle Tennessee	7	–	1	10	–	3
Louisiana–Monroe	5	–	3	6	–	6
Florida Atlantic	5	–	3	5	–	7
Louisiana–Lafayette	4	–	4	6	–	6
Arkansas State	3	–	5	4	–	8
FIU	3	–	5	3	–	9
North Texas	1	–	7	2	–	10
Western Kentucky	0	–	8	0	–	12
$ – Conference champion

2009 Western Athletic Conference football standings
	Conf.			Overall
Team	W		L	W		L
No. 4 Boise State $%	8	–	0	14	–	0
Nevada	7	–	1	8	–	5
Fresno State	6	–	2	8	–	5
Idaho	4	–	4	8	–	5
Hawaii	3	–	5	6	–	7
Louisiana Tech	3	–	5	4	–	8
Utah State	3	–	5	4	–	8
New Mexico State	1	–	7	3	–	10
San Jose State	1	–	7	2	–	10
% – BCS at-large representative; $ – Conference champion; Rankings from AP Poll

2009 NCAA Division I FBS independents football records
	Conf.			Overall
Team	W		L	W		L
Navy		–		10	–	4
Notre Dame		–		6	–	6
Army		–		5	–	7
Rankings from AP Poll

== FCS team wins over FBS teams ==
Italics denotes FCS teams.

Date	Visiting team	Home team	Site	Result	Attendance	Ref.
September 3	No. 5 (FCS) Villanova	Temple	Lincoln Financial Field • Philadelphia, Pennsylvania (Mayor's Cup)	27–24	27,759	
September 5	No. 2 (FCS) Richmond	Duke	Wallace Wade Stadium • Durham, North Carolina	24–16	33,311	
September 5	No. 14 (FCS) William & Mary	Virginia	Scott Stadium • Charlottesville, Virginia	26–14	54,587	
September 12	No. 9 (FCS) New Hampshire	Ball State	Scheumann Stadium • Muncie, Indiana	23–16	11,884	
September 19	No. 13 (FCS) Central Arkansas	Western Kentucky	Houchens Industries–L. T. Smith Stadium • Bowling Green, Kentucky	28–7	17,295	
^{#}Rankings from AP Poll released prior to game.

== Conference summaries ==
Rankings reflect the Week 14 AP Poll before the conference championship games were played.

Conference championship games
Conference	Champion	Runner-Up	Score	Offensive Player of the Year	Defensive Player of the Year
ACC	No. 12 Georgia Tech* (vacated)	No. 25 Clemson	39–34	C. J. Spiller, RB, Clemson	Derrick Morgan, DE, Georgia Tech
Big 12	No. 3 Texas	No. 21 Nebraska	13–12	Colt McCoy, QB, Texas	Ndamukong Suh, DT, Nebraska
C-USA	East Carolina	No. 18 Houston	38–32	Case Keenum, QB, Houston (C-USA MVP); Joe Webb, QB, UAB (OPOY)	Bruce Miller, DE, Central Florida
MAC	Central Michigan	Ohio	20–10	Dan LeFevour, QB, Central Michigan	Adrian Robinson, DE, Temple
SEC	No. 2 Alabama	No. 1 Florida	32–13	Mark Ingram II, RB, Alabama	Rolando McClain, LB, Alabama
Other conference champions
Conference	Champion		Record	Offensive Player of the Year	Defensive Player of the Year
Big East	No. 5 Cincinnati		12–0 (7–0)	Dion Lewis, RB, Pittsburgh	Greg Romeus, DE, Pittsburgh; Mick Williams, DT, Pittsburgh
Big Ten	No. 8 Ohio State		10–2 (7–1)	John Clay, RB, Wisconsin	Jared Odrick, DT, Penn State; Greg Jones, LB, Michigan State
Mountain West	No. 4 TCU		12–0 (8–0)	Andy Dalton, QB, TCU	Jerry Hughes, DE, TCU
Pac-10	No. 7 Oregon		10–2 (8–1)	Toby Gerhart, RB, Stanford	Brian Price, DT, UCLA
Sun Belt	Troy		9–3 (8–0)	Levi Brown, QB, Troy	Cardia Jackson, LB, Louisiana-Monroe; Chris McCoy, DE, Middle Tennessee
WAC	No. 6 Boise State		13–0 (8–0)	Kellen Moore, QB, Boise State	Dontay Moch, LB, Nevada

For the first time since 1983, every conference in Division I FBS, even those that did not contest a championship game, had an undisputed champion.

* In July 2011, the NCAA released its findings from a two-year investigation into allegations that a Georgia Tech player received $321 in clothing from a runner for an agent. While no conclusive evidence was brought against the player, actions taken by the Georgia Tech athletic department were perceived as an attempt to hinder the NCAA investigation into this offense. The NCAA determined that the player should have been declared ineligible for the final three games of the 2009 season. As punishment for an accused "lack of cooperation" and hindering the investigation, Georgia Tech was required to vacate the ACC Championship Game win, along with other penalties. Consequently, there is currently no official 2009 ACC football champion.

== Bowl games ==
Non-BCS Bowls
Date	Game	Site	Teams	Winner
Dec 19	New Mexico Bowl	University Stadium; University of New Mexico; Albuquerque, New Mexico	Wyoming (6–6, 4–4 MWC); Fresno State (8–4, 6–2 WAC)	Wyoming 35–28 (2 OT)
Dec 19	St. Petersburg Bowl presented by Beef 'O' Brady's	Tropicana Field; St. Petersburg, Florida	Rutgers (8–4, 3–4 Big East); UCF (8–4, 6–2 C-USA)	Rutgers 45–24
Dec 20	R+L Carriers New Orleans Bowl	Louisiana Superdome; New Orleans	Middle Tennessee (9–3, 7–1 Sun Belt); Southern Miss (7–5, 5–3 C-USA)	Middle Tennessee 42–32
Dec 22	Maaco Bowl Las Vegas	Sam Boyd Stadium; University of Nevada, Las Vegas; Las Vegas	No. 14 BYU (10–2, 7–1 MWC); No. 18 Oregon State (8–4, 6–3 Pac-10)	BYU 44–20
Dec 23	SDCCU Poinsettia Bowl	Qualcomm Stadium; San Diego	No. 23 Utah (9–3, 6–2 MWC); California (8–4, 5–4 Pac-10)	Utah 37–27
Dec 24	Sheraton Hawaiʻi Bowl	Aloha Stadium; Honolulu, HI	SMU (7–5, 6–2 C-USA); Nevada (8–4, 7–1 WAC)	SMU 45–10
Dec 26	Little Caesars Pizza Bowl	Ford Field; Detroit	Marshall (6–6, 4–4 C-USA); Ohio (9–4, 7–1 MAC)	Marshall 26–17
Dec 26	Meineke Car Care Bowl	Bank of America Stadium; Charlotte, North Carolina	No. 17 Pittsburgh (9–3, 5–2 Big East); North Carolina (8–4, 4–4 ACC)	Pittsburgh 19–17
Dec 26	Emerald Bowl	AT&T Park; San Francisco	No. 24 USC (8–4, 5–4 Pac-10); Boston College (8–4, 5–3 ACC)	USC 24–13
Dec 27	Gaylord Hotels Music City Bowl	LP Field; Nashville, Tennessee	Clemson (8–5, 6–2 ACC); Kentucky (7–5, 3–5 SEC)	Clemson 21–13
Dec 28	Advocare V100 Independence Bowl	Independence Stadium; Shreveport, Louisiana	Georgia (7–5, 4–4 SEC); Texas A&M (6–6, 3–5 Big 12)	Georgia 44–20
Dec 29	EagleBank Bowl	RFK Stadium; Washington, D.C.	UCLA (6–6, 3–6 Pac-10); Temple (9–3, 7–1 MAC)	UCLA 30–21
Dec 29	Champs Sports Bowl	Citrus Bowl; Orlando, Florida	No. 25 Wisconsin (9–3, 5–3 Big Ten); No. 15 Miami (9–3, 5–3 ACC)	Wisconsin 20–14
Dec 30	Roady's Humanitarian Bowl	Bronco Stadium; Boise State University; Boise, Idaho	Idaho (7–5, 4–4 WAC); Bowling Green (7–5, 6–2 MAC)	Idaho 43–42
Dec 30	Pacific Life Holiday Bowl	Qualcomm Stadium; San Diego	No. 22 Nebraska (9–4, 6–3 Big 12); No. 20 Arizona (8–4, 6–3 Pac-10)	Nebraska 33–0
Dec 31	Bell Helicopters Armed Forces Bowl	Amon G. Carter Stadium; Texas Christian University; Fort Worth, Texas	Air Force (7–5, 5–3 MWC); Houston (10–3, 6–2 C–USA)	Air Force 47–20
Dec 31	Brut Sun Bowl	Sun Bowl Stadium; University of Texas at El Paso; El Paso, Texas	Oklahoma (7–5, 5–3 Big 12); No. 21 Stanford (8–4, 6–3 Pac-10)	Oklahoma 31–27
Dec 31	Texas Bowl	Reliant Stadium; Houston	Navy (9–4) (Note: Navy won seven games to be bowl-eligible, as they are playing a 13-game schedule. They secured the bid on November 7 with a 23–21 win over Notre Dame.); Missouri 13 (8–4, 4–4 Big 12)	Navy 35–13
Dec 31	Insight Bowl	Sun Devil Stadium; Arizona State University; Tempe, Arizona	Iowa State (6–6, 3–5 Big 12); Minnesota (6–6, 3–5 Big Ten)	Iowa State 14–13
Dec 31	Chick-fil-A Bowl	Georgia Dome; Atlanta	No. 11 Virginia Tech (9–3, 6–2 ACC); Tennessee (7–5, 4–4 SEC)	Virginia Tech 37–14
Jan 1	Outback Bowl	Raymond James Stadium; Tampa, Florida	Auburn (7–5, 3–5 SEC); Northwestern (8–4, 5–3 Big Ten)	Auburn 38–35 (OT)
Jan 1	Konica Minolta Gator Bowl	Jacksonville Municipal Stadium; Jacksonville, Florida	Florida State (6–6, 4–4 ACC); No. 16 West Virginia (9–3, 5–2 Big East)	Florida State 33–21
Jan 1	Capital One Bowl	Citrus Bowl; Orlando, Florida	No. 13 Penn State (10–2, 6–2 Big Ten); No. 12 LSU (9–3, 5–3 SEC)	Penn State 19–17
Jan 2	International Bowl	Rogers Centre; Toronto, Canada	South Florida (7–5, 3–4 Big East); Northern Illinois (7–5, 5–3 MAC)	South Florida 27–3
Jan 2	Papajohns.com Bowl	Legion Field; Birmingham, Alabama	Connecticut (7–5, 3–4 Big East); South Carolina (7–5, 3–5 SEC)	Connecticut 20–7
Jan 2	AT&T Cotton Bowl Classic	Cowboys Stadium; Arlington, Texas	Ole Miss (8–4, 4–4 SEC); No. 19 Oklahoma State (9–3, 6–2 Big 12)	Ole Miss 21–7
Jan 2	AutoZone Liberty Bowl	Liberty Bowl Memorial Stadium; Memphis, Tennessee	Arkansas (7–5, 3–5 SEC); East Carolina (9–4, 7–1 C–USA)	Arkansas 20–17 (OT)
Jan 2	Valero Energy Alamo Bowl	Alamodome; San Antonio	Texas Tech (8–4, 5–3 Big 12); Michigan State (6–6, 4–4 Big Ten)	Texas Tech 41–31
Jan 6	GMAC Bowl	Ladd–Peebles Stadium; Mobile, Alabama	Central Michigan (11–2, 8–0 MAC); Troy (9–3, 8–0 Sun Belt)	Central Michigan 44–41 (2OT)
Bowl Championship Series
Date	Game	Site	Teams	Winner
Jan 1	Rose Bowl Game presented by Citi	Rose Bowl Stadium; Pasadena, California	No. 8 Ohio State (10–2, 7–1 Big Ten); No. 7 Oregon (10–2, 8–1 Pac-10)	Ohio State 26–17
Jan 1	Allstate Sugar Bowl	Louisiana Superdome; New Orleans	No. 5 Florida (12–1, 8–0 SEC); No. 3 Cincinnati (12–0, 7–0 Big East)	Florida 51–24
Jan 4	Tostitos Fiesta Bowl	University of Phoenix Stadium; Glendale, Arizona	No. 6 Boise State (13–0, 8–0 WAC); No. 4 TCU (12–0, 8–0 MWC)	Boise State 17–10
Jan 5	FedEx Orange Bowl	Land Shark Stadium; Miami Gardens, Florida	No. 10 Iowa (10–2, 6–2 Big Ten); No. 9 Georgia Tech (11–2, 7–1 ACC)	Iowa 24–14
Jan 7	2010 Citi BCS National Championship Game	Rose Bowl Stadium; Pasadena, California	No. 1 Alabama (13–0, 8–0 SEC); No. 2 Texas (13–0, 8–0 Big 12)	Alabama 37–21

=== Bowl Challenge Cup standings ===
Conference	Wins	Losses	Pct.
Division I FBS Independents *	1	0	1.000
MWC	4	1	.800
Big East	4	2	.667
SEC	6	4	.600
Big Ten	4	3	.571
Big 12	4	4	.500
WAC	2	2	.500
Sun Belt *	1	1	.500
ACC	3	4	.429
C-USA	2	4	.333
Pac-10	2	5	.286
MAC	1	4	.200

* Does not meet minimum game requirement of three teams needed for a conference to be eligible. (In any case, "Independent" is not a conference, rather, it is the lack of one.)

== Awards and honors ==
=== Heisman Trophy voting ===
The Heisman Trophy is given to the year's most outstanding player

Player	School	Position	1st	2nd	3rd	Total
Mark Ingram II	Alabama	RB	227	236	151	1,304
Toby Gerhart	Stanford	RB	222	225	160	1,276
Colt McCoy	Texas	QB	203	188	160	1,145
Ndamukong Suh	Nebraska	DT	161	105	122	815
Tim Tebow	Florida	QB	43	70	121	390
C. J. Spiller	Clemson	RB	26	31	83	223
Kellen Moore	Boise State	QB	10	20	30	100
Case Keenum	Houston	QB	2	9	13	37
Mardy Gilyard	Cincinnati	WR	2	2	13	23
Golden Tate	Notre Dame	WR	2	3	9	21

=== Other award winners ===
- Walter Camp Award (top player): Colt McCoy, QB, Texas
- Maxwell Award (top player): Colt McCoy, QB, Texas
- AP Player of the Year: Ndamukong Suh, DT, Nebraska
- Bronko Nagurski Trophy (defensive player): Ndamukong Suh, DT, Nebraska
- Campbell Trophy (academic award, formerly the Draddy Trophy): Tim Tebow, QB, Florida
- Chuck Bednarik Award (defensive player): Ndamukong Suh, DT, Nebraska
- Dave Rimington Trophy (center): Maurkice Pouncey, C, Florida
- Davey O'Brien Award (quarterback): Colt McCoy, QB, Texas
- Dick Butkus Award (linebacker): Rolando McClain, LB, Alabama
- Doak Walker Award (running back): Toby Gerhart, RB, Stanford
- Fred Biletnikoff Award (wide receiver): Golden Tate, WR, Notre Dame
- Jim Thorpe Award (defensive back): Eric Berry, CB, Tennessee
- John Mackey Award (tight end): Aaron Hernandez, TE, Florida
- Johnny Unitas Award (Sr. quarterback): Colt McCoy, QB, Texas
- Lombardi Award (top lineman): Ndamukong Suh, DT, Nebraska
- Lott Trophy (defensive impact): Jerry Hughes, DE, TCU
- Lou Groza Award (placekicker): Kai Forbath, K, UCLA
- Manning Award (quarterback): Colt McCoy, QB, Texas
- Outland Trophy (interior lineman): Ndamukong Suh, DT, Nebraska
- Ray Guy Award (punter): Drew Butler, P, Georgia
- Sammy Baugh Trophy (quarterback, specifically passer): Case Keenum, QB, Houston
- Ted Hendricks Award (defensive end): Jerry Hughes, DE, TCU
- Wuerffel Trophy (humanitarian-athlete): Tim Hiller, QB, Western Michigan
- The Home Depot Coach of the Year Award: Brian Kelly, Cincinnati
- AP Coach of the Year: Gary Patterson, TCU
- Paul "Bear" Bryant Award (head coach): Chris Petersen, Boise State
- Walter Camp Coach of the Year (head coach): Gary Patterson, TCU
- Bobby Bowden National Collegiate Coach of the Year Award: Nick Saban, Alabama
- Broyles Award (assistant coach): Kirby Smart, Alabama

== Records ==
- The Iowa Hawkeyes became the first NCAA Division I FBS team to block two field goals on consecutive plays in their season-opening win over Northern Iowa.
- Brandon West of Western Michigan set the NCAA Division I FBS records for career all-purpose yards and career kick return yards. On November 14, West broke the record of 7,573 all-purpose yards set by DeAngelo Williams of Memphis. Against Michigan State on November 7, West broke the record of 2,945 return yards set by Jessie Henderson of SMU. West finished the season setting the records at 3,118 kick return yards and 7,764 total yards.
- Russell Wilson of North Carolina State set a new Division I record for most passes attempted without an interception, breaking the previous record of 325 set by André Woodson of Kentucky from 2006 to 2007. Wilson broke the record in the third quarter of the Pack's 45–14 win over Gardner–Webb on September 19. The streak ended at 379 on October 3 against Wake Forest. Wilson's last interception had been in the third quarter of the Wolfpack's game against Clemson on September 13, 2008.
- Texas' Colt McCoy picked up his 43rd career win as a starting quarterback, breaking the previous FBS record of 42 by Georgia's David Greene, with a 51–20 win over Kansas on November 21. The record was extended to 45 with wins over Texas A&M in the regular-season finale and Nebraska in the Big 12 Championship Game. However, his streak ended at the BCS Championship when he was injured early in the first quarter, and the Longhorns lost 37–21.
- C. J. Spiller of Clemson set a new record for career kickoff return touchdowns on the opening kickoff of the Tigers' game against archrival South Carolina on November 28. His seventh career TD return broke the previous record held by Anthony Davis of USC and Ashlan Davis of Tulsa.
- Central Michigan quarterback Dan LeFevour set a new FBS record for most combined career touchdowns passing, rushing, and receiving in the MAC Championship Game against Ohio. His two TD passes in the game gave him a career total of 148, surpassing the previous record of 147 held by Colt Brennan of Hawaiʻi and Graham Harrell of Texas Tech. In the GMAC Bowl, he passed for a TD and ran for another, ending his career with a total of 150 TDs.
- On December 12, 2009, against rival Army, Navy quarterback Ricky Dobbs ran for his 24th rushing touchdown on the season, giving him the single-season record for most rushing touchdowns by a quarterback.
- On December 30, 2009, in the Humanitarian Bowl against Idaho, Bowling Green wide receiver Freddie Barnes broke the single-season record for receptions, accumulating 155 total receptions on the year.

== Coaching changes ==
=== Preseason ===
Pre-season
Team	Outgoing coach	Reason	Replacement
Army	Stan Brock	Fired	Rich Ellerson
Auburn	Tommy Tuberville	Resigned/Retired	Gene Chizik
Ball State	Brady Hoke	Hired as head coach at San Diego State	Stan Parrish
Boston College	Jeff Jagodzinski	Fired	Frank Spaziani
Bowling Green	Gregg Brandon	Fired	Dave Clawson
Clemson	Tommy Bowden	Resigned	Dabo Swinney
Eastern Michigan	Jeff Genyk	Fired	Ron English
Iowa State	Gene Chizik	Hired as head coach at Auburn	Paul Rhoads
Kansas State	Ron Prince	Fired	Bill Snyder
Miami (OH)	Shane Montgomery	Resigned	Mike Haywood
Mississippi State	Sylvester Croom	Resigned	Dan Mullen
New Mexico	Rocky Long	Resigned	Mike Locksley
New Mexico State	Hal Mumme	Fired	DeWayne Walker
Oregon	Mike Bellotti	Promoted to Oregon athletic director	Chip Kelly
Purdue	Joe Tiller	Retired	Danny Hope
San Diego State	Chuck Long	Fired	Brady Hoke
Syracuse	Greg Robinson	Fired	Doug Marrone
Tennessee	Phillip Fulmer	Resigned/fired	Lane Kiffin
Toledo	Tom Amstutz	Resigned	Tim Beckman
Utah State	Brent Guy	Fired	Gary Andersen
Washington	Tyrone Willingham	Fired	Steve Sarkisian
Wyoming	Joe Glenn	Fired	Dave Christensen

=== Postseason ===
Note:

- All November and December dates are in 2009; all January dates are in 2010.
- Incoming coaches who were the designated replacement for their predecessors are in **bold italics**.

End of season
Team	Outgoing coach	Date of departure	Reason	Replacement	Date of replacement
Akron	J. D. Brookhart	November 28	Fired	Rob Ianello	
Buffalo	Turner Gill	December 12	Hired by Kansas	Jeff Quinn	December 21 (effective January 2)
Central Michigan	Butch Jones	December 16	Hired by Cincinnati	Dan Enos	
Cincinnati	Brian Kelly	December 10	Hired by Notre Dame	Butch Jones	December 16 (effective January 2)
East Carolina	Skip Holtz	January 14	Hired by South Florida	Ruffin McNeil	January 21
Florida State	Bobby Bowden	December 1 (effective January 2)	Retired	Jimbo Fisher	December 1 (effective January 2)
Kansas	Mark Mangino	December 3	Resigned	Turner Gill	December 12
Kentucky	Rich Brooks	January 4	Retired	Joker Phillips	January 4
Louisiana-Monroe	Charlie Weatherbie	November 30	Fired	Todd Berry	December 16
Louisiana Tech	Derek Dooley	January 15	Hired by Tennessee	Sonny Dykes	January 20
Louisville	Steve Kragthorpe	November 28	Fired	Charlie Strong	December 9
Marshall	Mark Snyder	November 29	Resigned	Doc Holliday	December 17 (effective December 27)
Memphis	Tommy West	November 9 (effective November 27)	Fired	Larry Porter	November 29
Notre Dame	Charlie Weis	November 30	Fired	Brian Kelly	December 10
San Jose State	Dick Tomey	November 17 (effective December 5)	Retired	Mike MacIntyre	December 17
South Florida	Jim Leavitt	January 8	Fired	Skip Holtz	January 14
Tennessee	Lane Kiffin	January 12	Hired by USC	Derek Dooley	January 15
Texas Tech	Mike Leach	December 30	Fired	Tommy Tuberville	January 10
UNLV	Mike Sanford	November 17 (effective November 28)	Fired	Bobby Hauck	
USC	Pete Carroll	January 9	Hired by Seattle Seahawks	Lane Kiffin	January 12
Virginia	Al Groh	November 29	Fired	Mike London	December 7
Western Kentucky	David Elson	November 9 (effective December 3)	Fired	Willie Taggart	November 29 (effective December 3)

On December 26, Florida head coach Urban Meyer announced his resignation due to health concerns, effective after the Gators' Sugar Bowl appearance. However, Meyer had a change of heart and announced the following day that he would instead take an indefinite leave of absence, and expected to be back coaching by the start of the 2010 season. Offensive coordinator Steve Addazio took over Meyer's duties in his absence. Meyer returned from his self-imposed leave in time for Florida's 2010 spring practice.

== TV ratings ==
=== Ten most watched regular season games in 2009 ===
1. December 5 – 2009 SEC Championship – CBS – 1 Florida vs 2 Alabama – 17.969 million viewers
2. December 5 – 2009 Big 12 Championship – ESPN on ABC – 3 Texas vs 22 Nebraska – 12.693 million viewers
3. September 12 – ESPN – 3 USC vs 8 Ohio State – 10.586 million viewers
4. October 10 – CBS – 4 LSU vs 1 Florida – 10.496 million viewers
5. October 17 – Red River Rivalry – ESPN on ABC – 20 Oklahoma vs 3 Texas – 8.713 million Viewers
6. September 7 – ESPN – Miami vs 18 Florida State – 8.406 million viewers
7. September 12 – ESPN on ABC – 18 Notre Dame vs Michigan – 8.391 million viewers
8. November 27 – Iron Bowl – CBS – 2 Alabama vs Auburn – 8.124 million viewers
9. October 3 – ESPN on ABC Regional – 8 Oklahoma vs 17 Miami & California vs 7 USC – 7.834 million viewers
10. November 28 – CBS – Florida State vs 1 Florida – 7.491 million viewers

== Attendances ==
#	Team	Games	Total	Average
1	Michigan	8	871,464	108,933
2	Penn State	8	856,066	107,008
3	Ohio State	7	736,830	105,261
4	Texas	6	607,049	101,175
5	Tennessee	8	793,760	99,220
6	Georgia	6	556,476	92,746
7	LSU	7	647,420	92,489
8	Alabama	7	644,084	92,012
9	Florida	7	634,446	90,635
10	Nebraska	7	601,216	85,888
11	Southern California	6	508,796	84,799
12	Oklahoma	6	508,670	84,778
13	Auburn	8	676,911	84,614
14	Notre Dame	7	565,565	80,795
15	Wisconsin	7	560,764	80,109
16	Texas A&M	7	537,602	76,800
17	Clemson	7	530,553	75,793
18	South Carolina	7	527,580	75,369
19	Michigan State	7	523,186	74,741
20	Florida State	6	446,067	74,345
21	Iowa	7	491,499	70,214
22	Kentucky	7	487,156	69,594
23	Virginia Tech	6	397,398	66,233
24	Arkansas	7	455,783	65,112
25	UCLA	6	387,283	64,547
26	Washington	7	450,491	64,356
27	BYU	6	385,416	64,236
28	Missouri	6	384,719	64,120
29	Illinois	6	357,267	59,545
30	California	6	356,830	59,472
31	Oregon	7	409,806	58,544
32	West Virginia	7	401,216	57,317
33	North Carolina	7	396,250	56,607
34	North Carolina State	8	451,377	56,422
35	Mississippi	7	390,368	55,767
36	Mississippi State	7	376,544	53,792
37	Oklahoma State	8	429,750	53,719
38	Pittsburgh	7	374,119	53,446
39	Arizona	6	315,330	52,555
40	South Florida	6	315,319	52,553
41	Georgia Tech	6	309,501	51,584
42	Minnesota	7	355,635	50,805
43	Kansas	6	303,488	50,581
44	Purdue	7	353,197	50,457
45	Texas Tech	7	351,742	50,249
46	Colorado	6	300,527	50,088
47	Rutgers	7	343,788	49,113
48	Arizona State	7	339,890	48,556
49	Virginia	7	335,902	47,986
50	Miami Hurricanes	6	285,306	47,551
51	Kansas State	6	280,579	46,763
52	Iowa State	6	277,453	46,242
53	Utah	6	270,929	45,155
54	Maryland	7	311,163	44,452
55	Oregon State	6	253,969	42,328
56	Indiana	6	250,997	41,833
57	East Carolina	7	292,191	41,742
58	Stanford	7	290,049	41,436
59	Syracuse	8	312,343	39,043
60	Connecticut	6	229,376	38,229
61	TCU	6	229,121	38,187
62	UCF	7	266,543	38,078
63	Hawaii	7	257,074	36,725
64	Baylor	6	217,837	36,306
65	Boston College	7	250,009	35,716
66	Air Force	6	213,937	35,656
67	Vanderbilt	6	210,092	35,015
68	Cincinnati	6	203,741	33,957
69	Fresno State	5	167,889	33,578
70	Boise State	7	229,472	32,782
71	Louisville	6	194,702	32,450
72	Wake Forest	7	222,537	31,791
73	Navy	6	190,366	31,728
74	Southern Miss	6	184,178	30,696
75	UTEP	6	174,058	29,010
76	Army	6	167,984	27,997
77	New Mexico	6	161,661	26,944
78	Duke	6	157,881	26,314
79	Washington State	6	155,455	25,909
80	Memphis	6	154,769	25,795
81	Houston	6	151,450	25,242
82	Tulane	6	150,884	25,147
83	San Diego State	6	146,785	24,464
84	Northwestern	7	169,332	24,190
85	Colorado State	6	141,856	23,643
86	UNLV	7	159,423	22,775
87	Tulsa	6	135,010	22,502
88	Marshall	6	133,415	22,236
89	SMU	6	128,085	21,348
90	Middle Tennessee	6	123,104	20,517
91	Western Michigan	5	101,652	20,330
92	Louisiana Tech	5	100,000	20,000
93	Central Michigan	5	98,508	19,702
94	Wyoming	6	116,963	19,494
95	Louisiana-Lafayette	6	111,998	18,666
96	Troy	5	92,066	18,413
97	North Texas	6	109,367	18,228
98	UAB	5	89,933	17,987
99	Ohio	6	107,682	17,947
100	Arkansas State	5	88,445	17,689
101	Nevada	6	104,999	17,500
102	Akron	6	104,293	17,382
103	Temple	6	104,276	17,379
104	New Mexico State	6	99,064	16,511
105	Toledo	5	81,424	16,285
106	Utah State	5	79,857	15,971
107	Buffalo	6	95,758	15,960
108	Kent State	6	93,072	15,512
109	San Jose State	6	92,062	15,344
110	FAU	5	76,630	15,326
111	Northern Illinois	6	89,335	14,889
112	Western Kentucky	6	84,616	14,103
113	Bowling Green	6	84,261	14,044
114	Louisiana-Monroe	5	69,443	13,889
115	Rice	6	81,309	13,552
116	Idaho	6	75,273	12,546
117	Miami RedHawks	5	59,052	11,810
118	Ball State	6	65,327	10,888
119	FIU	5	51,018	10,204
120	Eastern Michigan	5	25,080	5,016
