= 2009 Texas Bowl =

- Texas Bowl logo for 2009
Navy Midshipmen	Missouri Tigers
(9–4)	(8–4)
Independent	Big 12
35	13
Head coach: Ken Niumatalolo	Head coach: Gary Pinkel
	1	2	3	4	Total
Navy	7	7	7	14	35
Missouri	7	3	0	3	13
- Date: December 31, 2009
- Season: 2009
- Stadium: Reliant Stadium
- Location: Houston, Texas
- MVP: QB Ricky Dobbs, Navy
- Favorite: Missouri by 6.5
- Referee: Perry Havener (Sun Belt Conference)
- Attendance: 69,441

United States TV coverage
- Network: ESPN
- Announcers: Mark Jones; Bob Davie; Quint Kessenich
- Nielsen ratings: 2.1

The 2009 Texas Bowl was the fourth edition of the college football bowl game, and was played at Reliant Stadium in Houston, Texas. The game started at 2:30 p.m. US CST on Thursday, December 31, 2009. The game was telecast on ESPN for the first time in bowl history after being televised by the NFL Network for the first three games. The Texas Bowl matched the Big 12 Conference sixth-place Missouri Tigers against independent Navy Midshipmen. Navy defeated Missouri 35–13.

This was the first time that either team appeared in the Texas Bowl. It was the seventh year in a row that Navy appeared in a bowl game, and a team record fifth year in a row that Missouri made a post-season appearance. Missouri came off two straight bowl wins while Navy had lost three bowl games in a row. The game marked the third time that the two teams had played each other and the second time they had met in a bowl game. Prior to the 2009 Texas Bowl, Missouri held a 2–0 advantage with a 35–14 victory in 1948 and a 21–14 win in 1961 in the Orange Bowl.

== Game summary ==
Navy wore their navy blue home jerseys with white and red trimmed shoulders, Missouri wore their white away jerseys. Missouri struck first with a 58-yard touchdown pass to Danario Alexander, but that would be the best part of the day for Missouri. Despite a fumble by Navy, the Midshipmen defense shut Missouri down, and gave the ball back to Navy QB Ricky Dobbs, who atoned for his fumble on the previous drive with a one-yard TD rush, his 25th of the season. Dobbs would fumble again in the endzone, resulting in Missouri having a chance to take the lead before halftime, but Missouri fumbled on the next play, and Dobbs atoned for his fumble once more with a touchdown. Missouri cut it to 14–10 for halftime, but they would not draw any closer. Navy dominated the rest of the game. After halftime, Navy took a 21–10 lead on a Dobbs pass to Bobby Doyle. Missouri QB Blaine Gabbert then threw an interception, and Navy didn't look back. Navy ate up most of the 3rd quarter before a 4th down stop. However, Missouri could only amass a field goal out of a 95-yard drive. Navy won by a final count of 35–13. Ricky Dobbs took Texas Bowl MVP honors.

=== Scoring ===
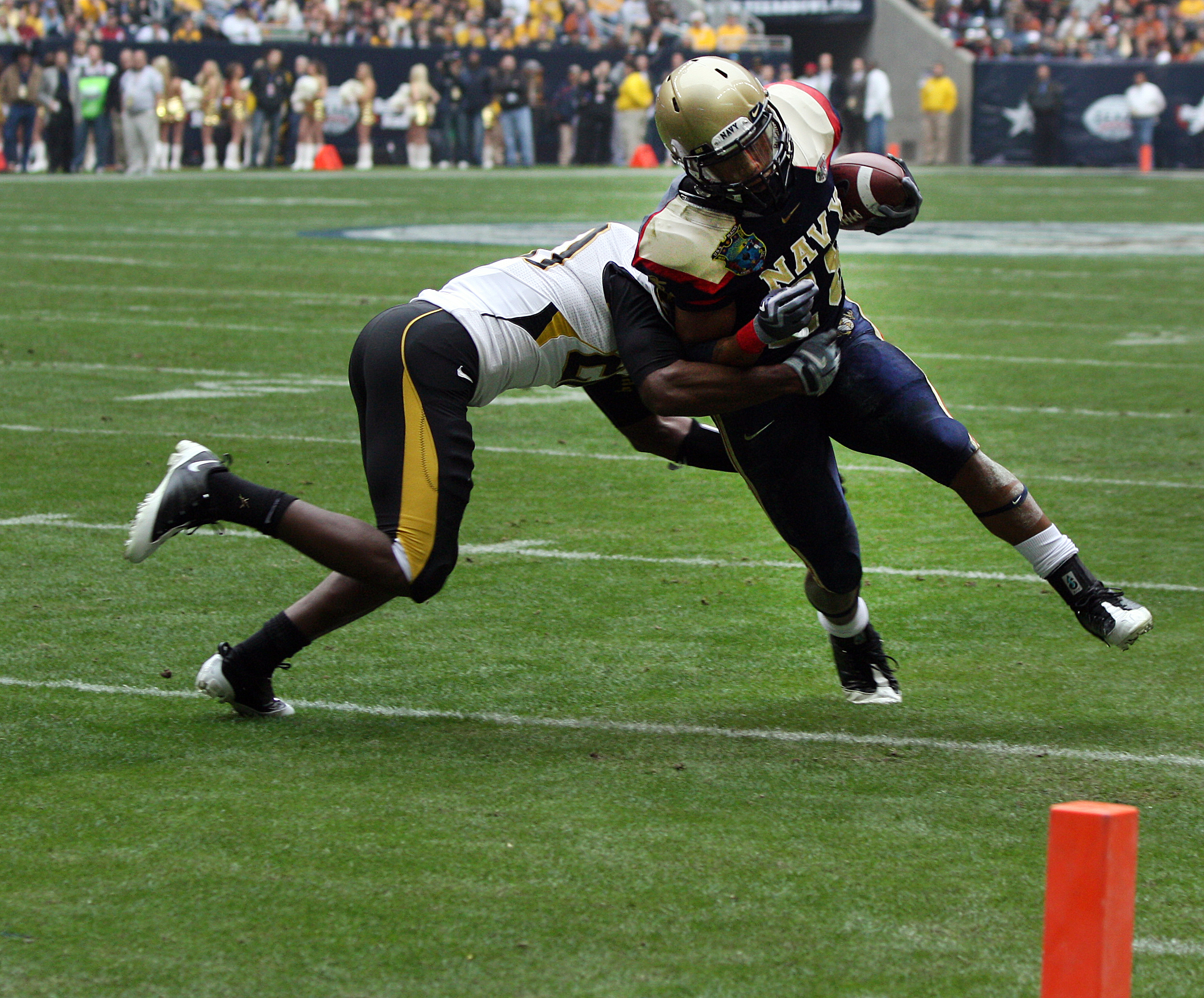
Marcus Curry scores a touchdown for Navy in the fourth quarter

Scoring play	Score
1st Quarter
MIZZ – Blaine Gabbert 58-yard pass to Danario Alexander (Grant Ressel kick), 14:36	MIZZ 7–0
NAVY – Ricky Dobbs 1-yard rush (Joe Buckley kick), 2:58	TIE 7–7
2nd Quarter
NAVY – Ricky Dobbs 13-yard rush (Joe Buckley kick), 0:45	NAVY 14–7
MIZZ – Grant Ressel 31-yard field goal, 0:00	NAVY 14–10
3rd Quarter
NAVY – Ricky Dobbs 3-yard pass to Bobby Doyle (Joe Buckley kick), 10:04	NAVY 21–10
4th Quarter
MIZZ – Grant Ressel 31-yard field goal, 14:58	NAVY 21–13
NAVY – Marcus Curry 11-yard rush (Joe Buckley kick), 14:23	NAVY 28–13
NAVY – Ricky Dobbs 1-yard rush (Joe Buckley kick), 4:56	NAVY 35–13

=== Statistics ===
Statistics	NAVY	MIZZ
First downs	28	17
Plays–yards	81–515	57–356
Rushes–yards	67–385	26–65
Passing yards	130	291
Passing: Comp–Att–Int	9–14–0	15–31–2
Time of possession	40:54	19:06
