= Ricky Dobbs =

American footballer and politician (born 1988)

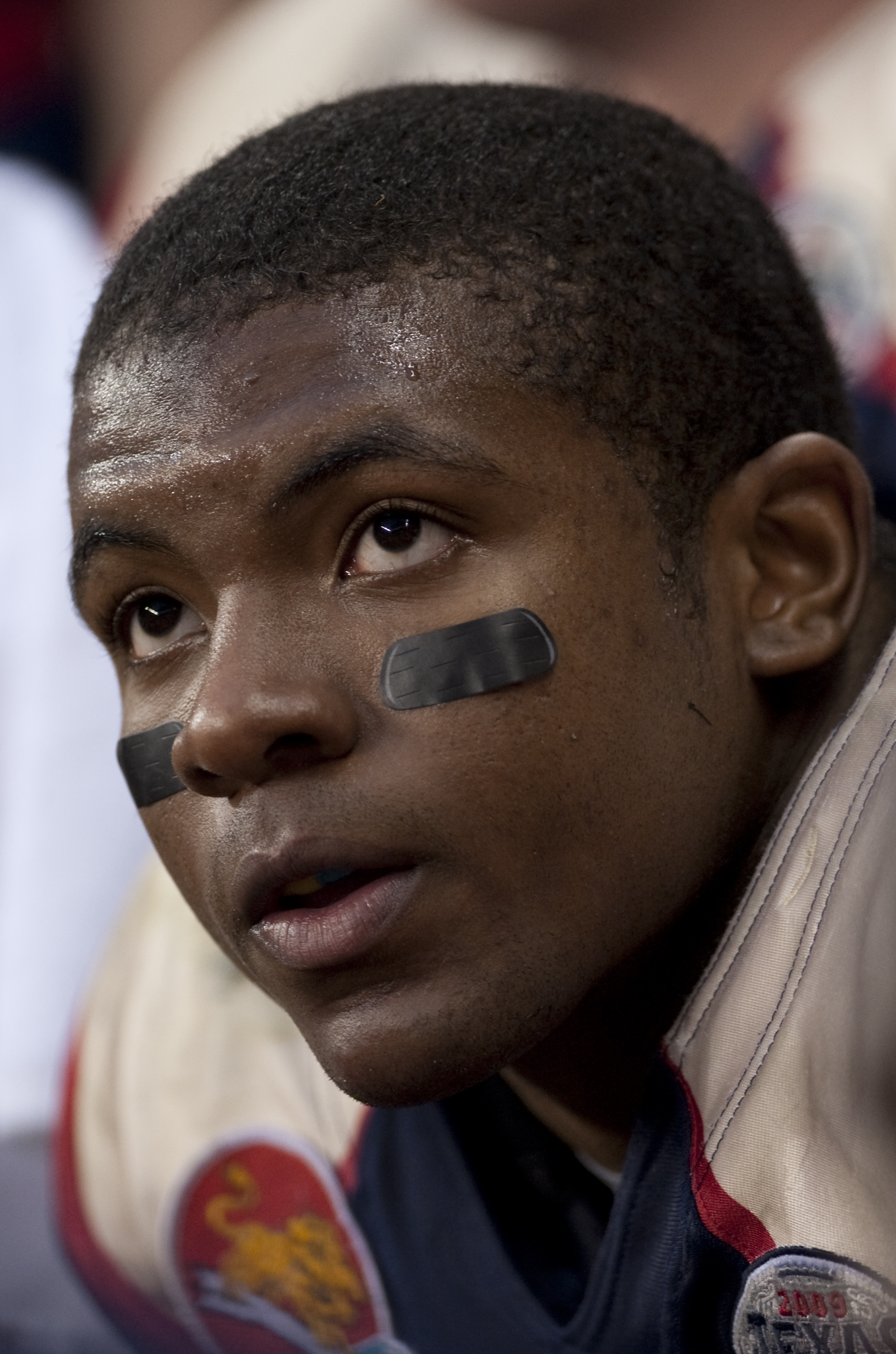
- Dobbs at the 2009 Texas Bowl

District 1 Douglas County Commissioner
- In office May 19, 2023 – September 4, 2024
- Appointed by: Brian Kemp
- Preceded by: Jim Mitchell
- Succeeded by: Jim Mitchell

Personal details
- Born: January 31, 1988 (age 38) Atlanta, Georgia, U.S.
- Football career

Profile
- Position: Quarterback

Personal information
- Listed height: 6 ft 1 in (1.85 m)
- Listed weight: 198 lb (90 kg)

Career information
- High school: Douglas County High School, (Douglasville, Georgia)
- College: Navy (2007–2010)

Awards and highlights
- Texas Bowl MVP (2009); NCAA record: Most rushing touchdowns by a college quarterback in a single season (27)

Clarence Ricky Dobbs Jr. (better known as Ricky Dobbs; born January 31, 1988) is a United States Navy officer, politician and former college football quarterback for the United States Naval Academy who served as the District 1 Douglas County, Georgia Commissioner from May 19, 2023 to September 4, 2024. During the 2009 season he broke the single season college football record for most rushing touchdowns by a quarterback with 27.

== Early life ==
Born Clarence Ricky Dobbs Jr. in Atlanta, Georgia, Dobbs' parents divorced when he was two years old. He was raised by his mother, who battled drug addiction, while his father started a new family. His mother had five heart attacks while Dobbs was a teenager. His father was an electrician and his mother was a beautician.

Dobbs was known as "the Mayor" by his teachers at Douglas County High School in Douglasville, Georgia. He was the recipient of the Faculty Cup at his commencement ceremony in 2006. Dobbs was also voted Homecoming King & Mr.DCHS by his peers.

He had an offer to play wide receiver for Georgia Tech, but chose Navy in part because of medical benefits for himself and family as well as opportunities beyond football and service to his country.

== College career ==
Dobbs ran the triple option offense for the Navy Midshipmen.

=== 2008 season ===
Dobbs rushed for 499 yards and eight touchdowns. Navy was honored at the White House in April 2009 for winning a sixth straight Commander-in-Chief's Trophy, and Dobbs said he autographed a helmet presented to President Barack Obama five times "so Obama would remember him".

=== 2009 season ===
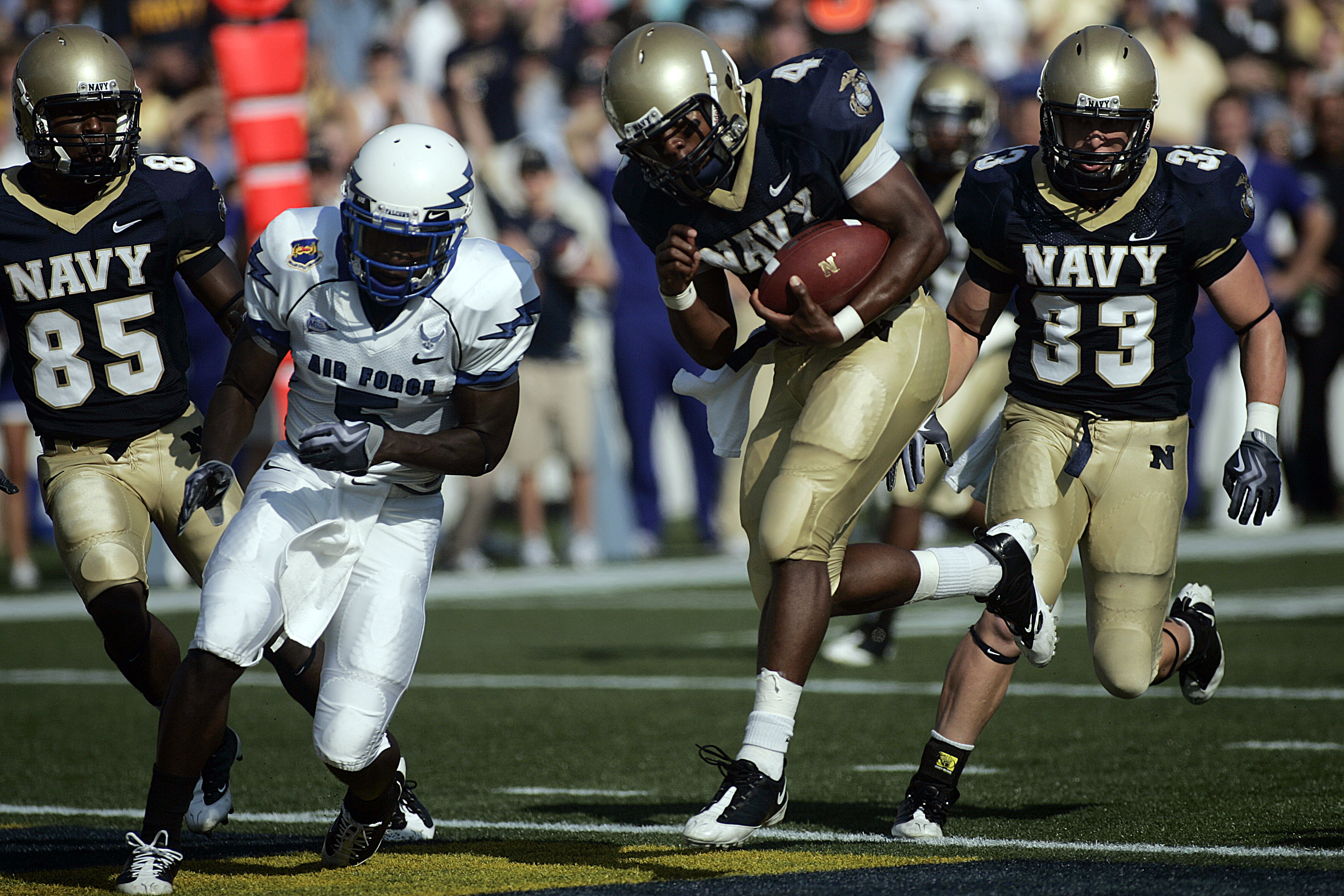
Dobbs (no. 4) scores a touchdown on October 3, 2009 against Air Force.

During his first full year as a starter, Dobbs rushed for more than 1,000 yards and had 1031 passing yards and six passing touchdowns. The team had the second best rushing offense in terms of yards.

Dobbs missed one game and most of another with a broken bone in his knee. Navy beat Notre Dame, but lost to Hawaii.

Dobbs tied Tim Tebow's record 23 rushing touchdowns for a quarterback on November 27.

On December 12 against arch rival Army, Dobbs ran for his 24th rushing touchdown on the season, making him at the time the record holder for most rushing touchdowns by a quarterback in a single season.

Navy played in the Texas Bowl on December 31 against Missouri, their seventh straight bowl game. Dobbs ran for 166 yards and three touchdowns in the game and completed 9 of 14 passes for 130 yards and a fourth touchdown in a 35–13 victory. Dobbs finished with the NCAA record of 27 single-season quarterback rushing touchdowns and was named the game's MVP.

His final collegiate game was the 2011 East–West Shrine Game.

Since his graduation, TV announcers have gotten Dobbs to be a special guest caller while on board his current ship during a few of the televised Navy Midshipmen's football games in 2012 and 2013, giving the viewers an update on his career.

=== Statistics ===
Year	Team	Games			Passing								Rushing			
Year	Team	GP	GS	Record	Cmp	Att	Pct	Yds	Y/A	TD	Int	Rtg	Att	Yds	Avg	TD
2007	Navy	0	0	—	DNP											
2008	Navy	8	1	1–0	9	16	56.3	212	13.3	1	1	175.7	106	495	4.7	8
2009	Navy	13	12	9–3	56	105	53.3	1,031	9.8	6	3	149.0	315	1,203	3.8	27
2010	Navy	12	12	8–4	82	150	54.7	1,527	10.2	13	6	160.8	266	967	3.6	14
Career		33	25	18–7	147	271	54.2	2,770	10.2	20	10	157.1	687	2,665	3.9	49

== Naval career ==
After graduating the Naval Academy on May 27, 2011, Dobbs, who had studied to be a surface warfare officer, received his choice assignment of being on a destroyer.

At his request, Dobbs was assigned to the USS Oscar Austin, a sophisticated Arleigh Burke class destroyer. During his 2 ½-year tour aboard the ship, deployed off the coast of Somalia, Dobbs served as an ensign and main propulsion division officer, and performed maritime security operations.

During the televised 2014 Navy vs. Western Kentucky game, CBS Sports Network commentators John Sadak and Randy Cross announced while in a Bass Pro Shops-sponsored segment entitled "Where are they now?" that Dobbs was serving his 5-year commitment aboard the USS Sirocco, a Cyclone-class patrol ship bound for Bahrain. He spent 18 months aboard the ship serving as operations officer, executive officer, legal officer, and navigator as the vessel performed coastal patrol and interdiction surveillance in the region.

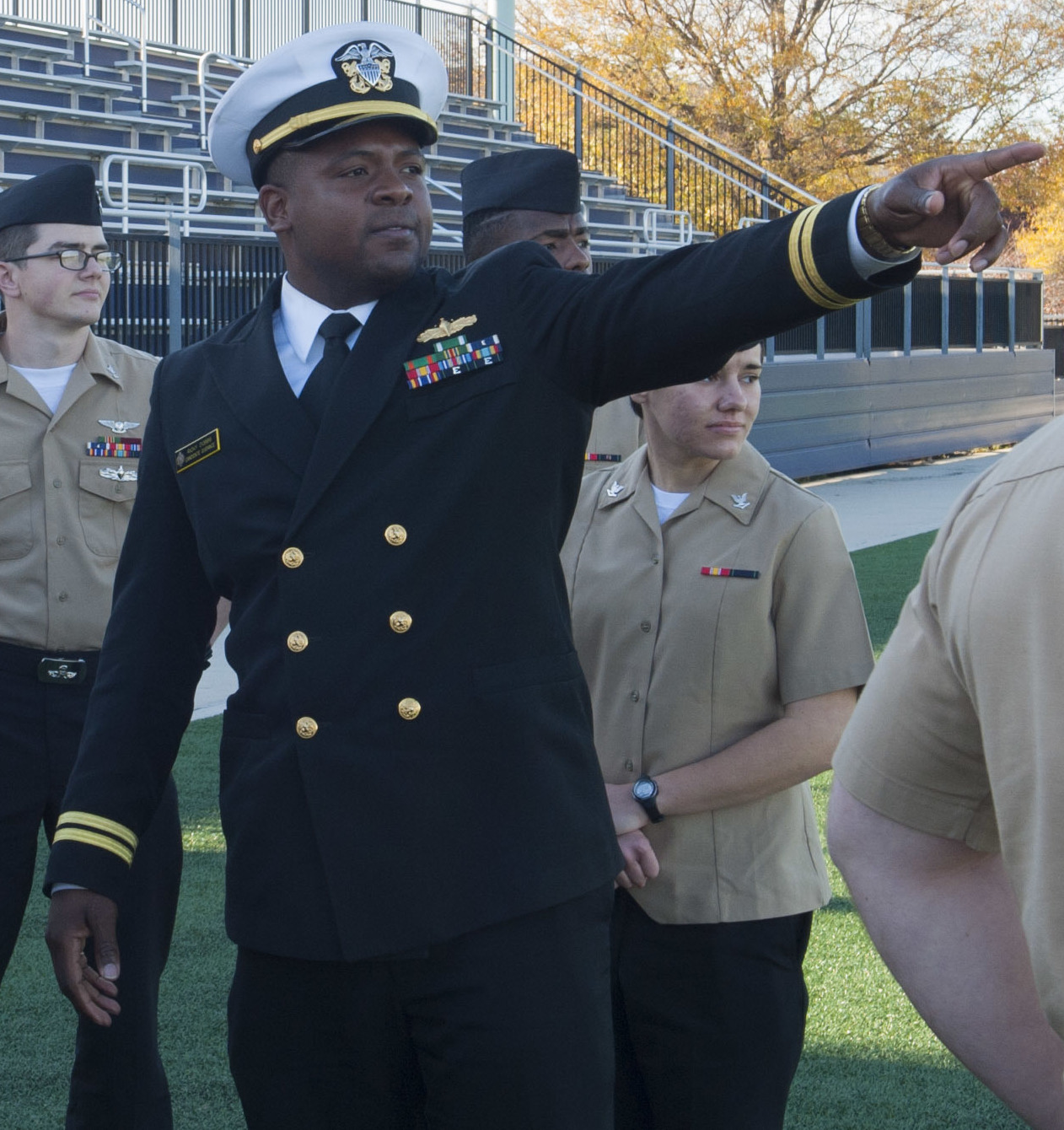
Dobbs in 2016 during his service at the Naval Academy

Dobbs was stationed at the Naval Academy through the end of 2017, working as a recruiting counselor in the admissions office. He held the title of Candidate Guidance Officer for the states of Florida, Georgia, South Carolina, Puerto Rico and the Virgin Islands.

He was undecided whether he would remain in the service or process out upon completion of his assignment. However, in 2016, it was reported that Dobbs still dreamt of playing professional football, whether in the NFL or the CFL. In 2016, he said he had aspirations to run for U.S. President in 2040.

On October 27, 2023, the same day that Gaza war began, it was reported that Dobbs would be deployed with his United States Navy Reserve unit to the Mediterranean Sea to deter threats to Israel. Dobbs confirmed his deployment a few days later.

== Professional football career ==
In 2012 and 2013, while still serving in the Navy, Dobbs played semi-pro football for the Virginia Cyclones. In 2013, it was reported that Dobbs still had aspirations to get a chance to try out for the NFL someday and run for the U.S. presidency.

In 2018, Dobbs participated in the American Flag Football League, serving as captain of the Primetime team.

== Political career ==
One of Dobbs' idols is President Barack Obama. He was vice president of USNA class of 2011. He said that he wanted to become the first black president, but after Obama was elected, he stated "I guess I'll be the second now." He had a five-year military commitment after graduation.

On May 18 2023, Dobbs was appointed by Governor Brian Kemp to serve as the interim District 1 Douglas County, Georgia Commissioner in the wake of Commissioner Henry Mitchell's corruption indictment. Dobbs was joined by retired Sheriff Phil Miller who replaced Romona Jackson Jones, the Chairwoman having also been indicted for the same charges as Mitchell. Dobbs and Miller were sworn in by Superior Court Chief Justice William McClain the next day. On August 30, 2024, Mitchell and Jackson Jones were acquitted along with their codefendants, with both returning to the commission by September 4th. Dobbs was quoted as saying "I'll be back" and again affirmed his intentions to seek the presidency in 2040, following plans to run for local office in the near future.

== Personal life ==
On June 13, 2010, Dobbs was awarded a key to his hometown of Douglasville, Georgia by mayor Mickey Thompson. The day was also declared "Ricky Dobbs Day" in the city.

After graduating from Navy, he spent eight months coaching football at the Naval Academy Preparatory School.

As of 2023, Dobbs was a physical education teacher at Douglas County High School.
