= Texas Bowl =

Postseason NCAA-sanctioned Division I FBS college football bowl game

- Kinder's Texas Bowl
- Stadium: Reliant Stadium
- Location: Houston, Texas
- Operated: 2006–present
- Conference tie-ins: Big 12, SEC
- Previous conference tie-ins: Big East/C-USA/MWC (alternating years) (2006–2009); Big Ten (2010–2013)
- Payout: US$6.4 million (2019)
- Website: kinderstexasbowl.com
- Preceded by: Houston Bowl

Sponsors
- Meineke Car Care (2011–2012); AdvoCare (2014–2016); Academy Sports + Outdoors (2017–2019); Mercari (2020); TaxAct (2021–2023); Kinder's (2024–present)

Former names
- Texas Bowl (2006–2010); Meineke Car Care Bowl of Texas (2011–2012); Texas Bowl (2013); AdvoCare V100 Texas Bowl (2014–2016); Academy Sports + Outdoors Texas Bowl (2017–2019); Mercari Texas Bowl (2020, game canceled); TaxAct Texas Bowl (2021–2023)

2025 matchup
- Houston vs. LSU (Houston 38–35)

The Texas Bowl is an annual postseason NCAA-sanctioned Division I FBS college football bowl game first held in 2006 in Houston, Texas. Each edition of the bowl has been played at Reliant Stadium, previously known as NRG Stadium. The bowl replaced the defunct Houston Bowl, which was played annually from 2000 to 2005, and before that the Bluebonnet Bowl, the first bowl game in Houston, played from 1959 through 1987.

== History ==
=== Replacing the Houston Bowl ===
Speculation surfaced questioning the long-term survival of the former Houston Bowl. The three-year contract with EV1.net expired on December 31, 2005, leaving the bowl game without a title sponsor. A college football official told the Houston Chronicle that the bowl was in danger of ceasing operations, as a result of the game losing its title sponsor and because the Houston Bowl still owed roughly $600,000 to the Big 12 and Mountain West conferences following the 2005 game. However, the NCAA approved Lone Star Sports & Entertainment, a division of the Houston Texans, who also play in Reliant Stadium, to take over game management. In July 2006, the NFL Network acquired TV rights and naming rights to the bowl.

=== Texas Bowl introduction ===
The Texas Bowl name and logo were officially unveiled on August 10, 2006, at a press conference along with conference affiliations for the bowl spots. The Big 12, Big East and Conference USA will be affiliated with the game, as well as Texas Christian University of the Mountain West. The 2006 matchup featured teams from the Big 12 and Big East Conferences.

On December 3, 2006, Rutgers accepted an invitation to play Kansas State in the inaugural Texas Bowl. "We're ecstatic about having Rutgers," Texas Bowl director David Brady said. "This is a top-15 team that was three yards away from a BCS game. We couldn't be happier to have them here."

2010 marked the eleventh consecutive year a bowl game has played in Houston, and the 40th year overall with a bowl game there (the Bluebonnet Bowl lasted 29 years). It was also announced on December 30, 2009, that ESPN Events would take over as part owner and operator of the game, while Lone Star Sports and Entertainment will maintain a stake in the bowl, and would be carried on ESPN.

=== Sponsors ===
On April 12, 2011, ESPN announced Meineke Car Care signed a three-year title sponsorship deal beginning in 2011, changing name of the bowl to the Meineke Car Care Bowl of Texas. On February 12, 2014, it was announced that AdvoCare will be the title sponsor for the bowl game. That sponsorship concluded after the 2016 game. On November 15, 2017, Academy Sports + Outdoors became the new title sponsor of the bowl. That sponsorship concluded after the 2019 game.

On December 14, 2020, Mercari was announced as the new title sponsor of the game. The 2020 game was later canceled due to COVID-19 issues. On November 24, 2021, TaxAct was named as the new title sponsor of both the Texas Bowl and the Camellia Bowl. This arrangement remained in place through the 2023 edition. On December 4, 2024, Kinder's Flavors was named as the new title sponsor.

=== Conference tie-ins ===
On May 17, 2007, it was announced Conference USA would have a team in the 2007 Texas Bowl. The Texas Bowl has a rotating commitment with the Big East Conference and Conference USA for 2006–09 while the Big 12 Conference will have a team in all four of those games. In 2007, TCU took the place of the Big 12 team when Kansas and Oklahoma were put into the BCS, and Houston, a "home team," represented C-USA. The conferences would receive $612,500 each as per the rules of the agreements as usually, the Big East (or Big 12) would have received $750,000 for playing and C-USA would have received a $500,000 stipend for their team playing.

=== Issues ===
According to Sports Illustrated, in 2008 the bowl required Western Michigan University to purchase 11,000 tickets at full price in order to accept the invitation to play in the bowl. The university was only able to sell 548 tickets at that price, forcing it to accept a $462,535 loss, before travel expenses, to pay for the privilege of playing in the bowl.

The 2020 edition, slated for December 31 between TCU and Arkansas, was cancelled on December 29 due to COVID-19 issues within the TCU program.

== Game results ==
Rankings are based on the AP poll prior to the game being played.

Date	Time (CST)	Bowl name	Winning team		Losing team		Attendance
December 28, 2006	7:00 PM	Texas Bowl	No. 16 Rutgers	37	Kansas State	10	52,210
December 28, 2007	7:00 PM	Texas Bowl	TCU	20	Houston	13	62,097
December 30, 2008	7:00 PM	Texas Bowl	Rice	38	Western Michigan	14	58,880
December 31, 2009	2:30 PM	Texas Bowl	Navy	35	Missouri	13	69,441
December 29, 2010	5:00 PM	Texas Bowl	Illinois	38	Baylor	14	68,211
December 31, 2011	11:00 AM	Meineke Car Care Bowl of Texas	Texas A&M	33	Northwestern	22	68,395
December 28, 2012	8:00 PM	Meineke Car Care Bowl of Texas	Texas Tech	34	Minnesota	31	50,386
December 27, 2013	5:00 PM	Texas Bowl	Syracuse	21	Minnesota	17	32,327
December 29, 2014	8:00 PM	Texas Bowl	Arkansas	31	Texas	7	71,115
December 29, 2015	8:00 PM	Texas Bowl	No. 22 LSU†	56	Texas Tech	27	71,307
December 28, 2016	8:00 PM	Texas Bowl	Kansas State	33	Texas A&M	28	68,412
December 27, 2017	8:00 PM	Texas Bowl	Texas	33	Missouri	16	67,820
December 27, 2018	8:00 PM	Texas Bowl	Baylor	45	Vanderbilt	38	51,104
December 27, 2019	5:45 PM	Texas Bowl	Texas A&M	24	No. 25 Oklahoma State	21	68,415
December 31, 2020	7:00 PM	Texas Bowl	Canceled due to the COVID-19 pandemic (Note: The 2020 game was set to feature TCU vs. Arkansas.)				—
January 4, 2022	8:00 PM	Texas Bowl	Kansas State	42	LSU	20	52,207
December 28, 2022	8:00 PM	Texas Bowl	Texas Tech	42	Ole Miss	25	53,251
December 27, 2023	8:00 PM	Texas Bowl	No. 22 Oklahoma State	31	Texas A&M	23	55,212
December 31, 2024	2:30 PM	Texas Bowl	LSU	44	Baylor	31	59,940
December 27, 2025	8:15 PM	Texas Bowl	Houston	38	LSU	35	63,867

† LSU's win in the 2015 edition was vacated in 2023 by the NCAA for a booster-related violation.

== MVPs ==
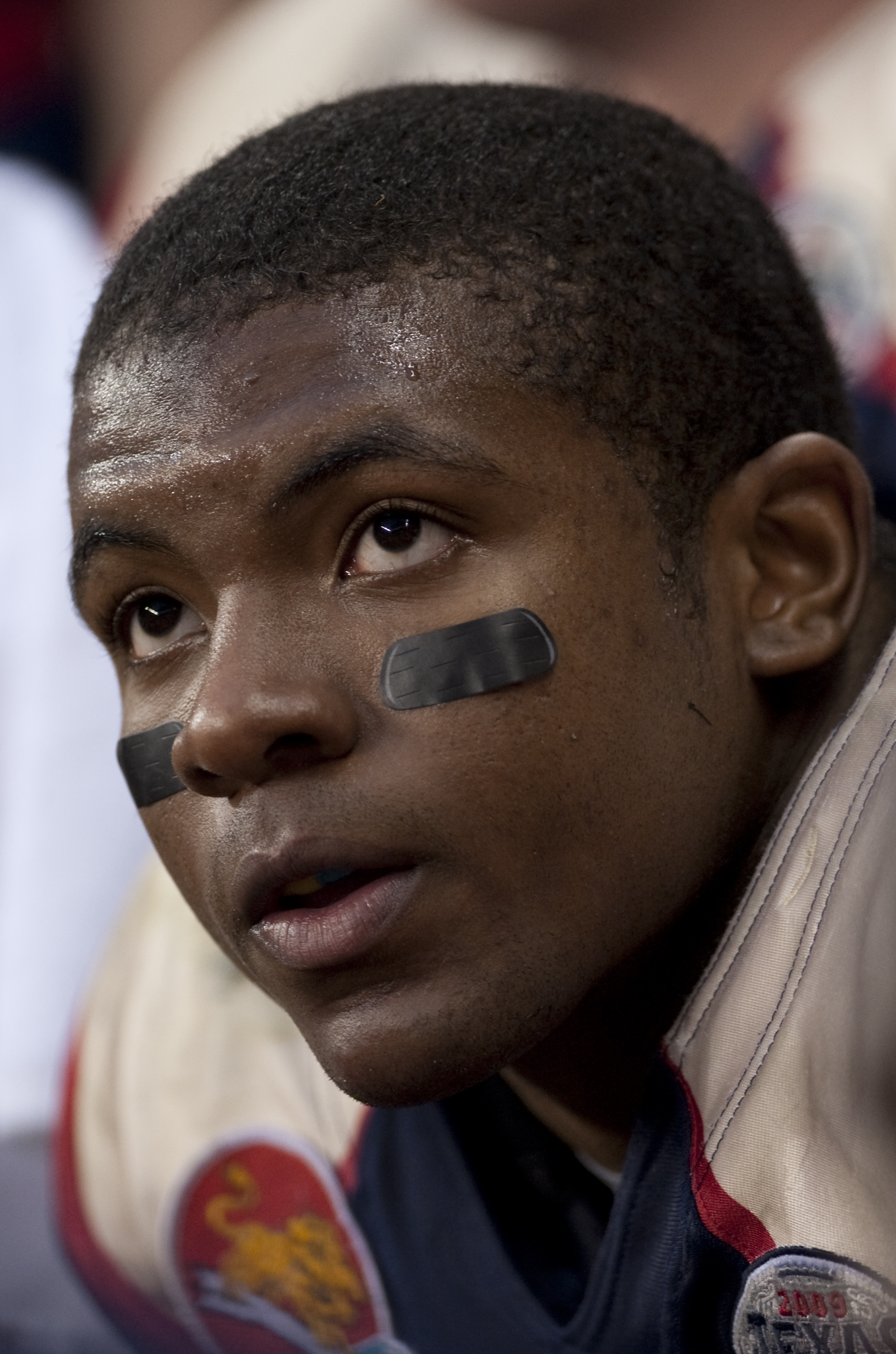
2009 MVP Ricky Dobbs

Year	MVP	Team	Position
2006	Ray Rice	Rutgers	RB
2007	Andy Dalton	TCU	QB
2008	Chase Clement	Rice	QB
2009	Ricky Dobbs	Navy	QB
2010	Mikel Leshoure	Illinois	RB
2011	Ryan Tannehill	Texas A&M	QB
2012	Seth Doege	Texas Tech	QB
2013	Terrel Hunt	Syracuse	QB
2014	Brandon Allen	Arkansas	QB
2015	Leonard Fournette	LSU	RB
2016	Jesse Ertz	Kansas State	QB
2017	Michael Dickson	Texas	P
2018	Charlie Brewer	Baylor	QB
2019	Kellen Mond	Texas A&M	QB
Jan. 2022	Skylar Thompson	Kansas State	QB
Dec. 2022	Tyler Shough	Texas Tech	QB
2023	Rashod Owens	Oklahoma State	WR
2024	Garrett Nussmeier	LSU	QB
2025	Conner Weigman	Houston	QB

== Most appearances ==
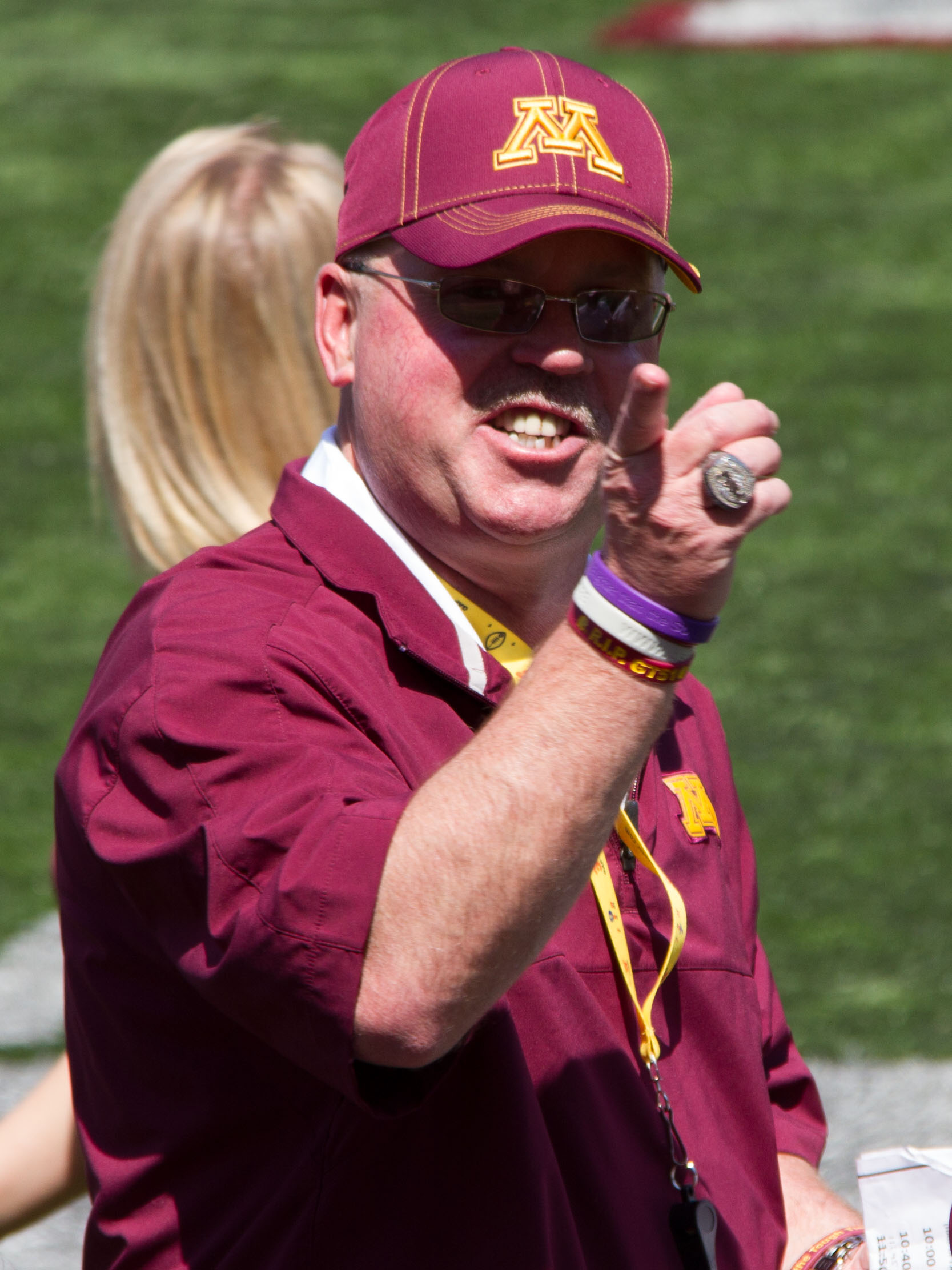
Head coach Jerry Kill led Minnesota to Texas Bowl appearances in 2012 and 2013.

Updated through the December 2025 edition (19 games, 38 total appearances).

Teams with multiple appearances

Rank	Team	Appearances	Record
1	Texas A&M	4	2–2
1	LSU	4	1–2‡
3	Kansas State	3	2–1
3	Texas Tech	3	2–1
3	Baylor	3	1–2
6	Texas	2	1–1
6	Oklahoma State	2	1–1
6	Houston	2	1–1
6	Minnesota	2	0–2
6	Missouri	2	0–2

‡ LSU's win in the 2015 edition was vacated by the NCAA in 2023.

Teams with a single appearance

Won (7): Arkansas, Illinois, Navy, Rice, Rutgers, Syracuse, TCU
Lost (4): Northwestern, Ole Miss, Vanderbilt, Western Michigan

== Appearances by conference ==
Updated through the December 2025 edition (19 games, 38 total appearances).

Conference	Record				Appearances by season		
Conference	Games	W	L	Win pct.	Won	Lost	Vacated
Big 12	16	9	7	.563	2011, 2012, 2016, 2017, 2018, 2021*, 2022, 2023, 2025	2006, 2009, 2010, 2014, 2015, 2019, 2024	
SEC	11	3	7	.300 ‡	2014, 2019, 2024	2016, 2017, 2018, 2021*, 2022, 2023, 2025	2015
Big Ten	4	1	3	.250	2010	2011, 2012, 2013	
CUSA	2	1	1	.500	2008	2007	
ACC	1	1	0	1.000	2013		
Independents	1	1	0	1.000	2009		
Mountain West	1	1	0	1.000	2007		
Big East	1	1	0	1.000	2006		
MAC	1	0	1	.000		2008	

‡ LSU's vacated victory following the 2015 season is excluded from the SEC's win–loss totals and winning percentage.

- Games marked with an asterisk (*) were played in January of the following calendar year.
- Rutgers appeared in 2006 as a member of the Big East; the American Conference retains the conference charter following the 2013 split of the original Big East along football lines.
- Independent appearances: Navy (2009)

== Game records ==
Team	Record, Team vs. Opponent	Year
Most points scored (one team)	56, LSU vs. Texas Tech	2015
Most points scored (losing team)	38, Vanderbilt vs. Baylor	2018
Most points scored (both teams)	83, shared by: LSU (56) vs. Texas Tech (27); Baylor (45) vs. Vanderbilt (38)	2015; 2018
Fewest points allowed	7, Arkansas vs. Texas	2014
Largest margin of victory	29, LSU vs. Texas Tech	2015
Total yards	668, Baylor vs. Vanderbilt	2018
Rushing yards	385, Navy vs. Missouri	2009
Passing yards	436, Oklahoma State vs. Texas A&M	2023
First downs	32, Houston vs. LSU	2025
Fewest yards allowed	59, Arkansas vs. Texas	2014
Fewest rushing yards allowed	2, Arkansas vs. Texas	2014
Fewest passing yards allowed	57, Arkansas vs. Texas	2014
Individual	Record, Player, Team vs. Opponent	Year
All-purpose yards	256, Leonard Fournette (LSU)	2015
Touchdowns (all-purpose)	5, Leonard Fournette (LSU)	2015
Rushing yards	243, Ke'Shawn Vaughn (Vanderbilt)	2018
Rushing touchdowns	4, Leonard Fournette (LSU)	2015
Passing yards	402, Alan Bowman (Oklahoma State)	2023
Passing touchdowns	4, shared by: Patrick Mahomes (Texas Tech); Conner Weigman (Houston)	2015; 2025
Receptions	16, Brennan Presley (Oklahoma State)	2023
Receiving yards	164, Rashod Owens (Oklahoma State)	2023
Receiving touchdowns	3, Jakeem Grant (Texas Tech)	2015
Tackles	17, Micah Awe (Texas Tech)	2015
Sacks	2.5, shared by: Justin Braska (Western Michigan); Kendell Beckwith (LSU)	2008; 2015
Interceptions	2, Michael Carter (Minnesota)	2012
Long Plays	Record, Player, Team vs. Opponent	Year
Touchdown run	79 yds., D. J. Chark (LSU)	2015
Touchdown pass	81 yds., Chris Hilton Jr. pass from Jontre Kirklin (LSU)	Jan. 2022
Kickoff return	99 yds., shared by: Jakeem Grant (Texas Tech); Barion Brown (LSU)	2012; 2025
Punt return	76 yds., Yamon Figurs (Kansas State)	2006
Interception return	62 yds., Wyatt Middleton (Navy)	2009
Fumble return	46 yds., Travon Bellamy (Illinois)	2010
Punt	65 yds., Chase Turner (Houston)	2007
Field goal	51 yds., Randy Bond (Texas A&M)	2023

== Media coverage ==
The first three editions of the bowl were televised by NFL Network. Since 2009, it has been carried by ESPN.
