= 2009 Navy Midshipmen football team =

American college football season

2009 Navy Midshipmen football
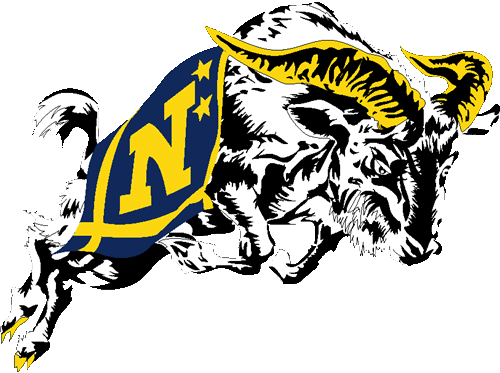

Texas Bowl champion

Texas Bowl, W 35–13 vs. Missouri
- Conference: Independent
- Record: 10–4
- Head coach: Ken Niumatalolo (2nd season)
- Offensive coordinator: Ivin Jasper (2nd season)
- Offensive scheme: Triple option
- Defensive coordinator: Buddy Green (8th season)
- Base defense: Multiple
- MVP: Ross Pospisil
- Captains: Osei Asante; Ross Pospisil

2009 NCAA Division I FBS independents football records
	Conf.			Overall
Team	W		L	W		L
Navy		–		10	–	4
Notre Dame		–		6	–	6
Army		–		5	–	7
Rankings from AP Poll

The 2009 Navy Midshipmen football team represented the United States Naval Academy as an independent in the 2009 NCAA Division I FBS football season. The Midshipmen, led by second-year head coach Ken Niumatalolo, played their home games at the Navy–Marine Corps Memorial Stadium.

On November 7, 2009 athletic director Chet Gladchuk announced that Navy had accepted an invitation to play in the Texas Bowl on Thursday, December 31 at Reliant Stadium in Houston, Texas against the Big 12 Conference's Missouri Tigers. This mark was the first time that Navy had gone to bowl games in seven straight seasons. Navy won the 2009 Texas Bowl, 35–13, and finished with a record of 10–4.

== Schedule ==
Date	Time	Opponent	Site	TV	Result	Attendance	Source
September 5	12:00 p.m.	at No. 6 Ohio State	Ohio Stadium; Columbus, OH	ESPN	L 27–31	105,092	
September 12	3:30 p.m.	Louisiana Tech	Navy–Marine Corps Memorial Stadium; Annapolis, MD	CBSCS	W 32–14	31,017	
September 19	6:00 p.m.	at Pittsburgh	Heinz Field; Pittsburgh, PA	ESPN360	L 14–27	55,064	
September 26	3:30 p.m.	Western Kentucky	Navy–Marine Corps Memorial Stadium; Annapolis, MD	CBSCS	W 38–22	29,009	
October 3	3:30 p.m.	Air Force	Navy–Marine Corps Memorial Stadium; Annapolis, MD (Commander-in-Chief's Trophy)	CBSCS	W 16–13 ^{OT}	37,820	
October 10	3:30 p.m.	at Rice	Rice Stadium; Houston, TX	CBSCS	W 63–14	15,096	
October 17	8:05 p.m.	at SMU	Gerald J. Ford Stadium; Dallas, TX (Gansz Trophy)		W 38–35 ^{OT}	22,203	
October 24	3:30 p.m.	Wake Forest^{†}	Navy–Marine Corps Memorial Stadium; Annapolis, MD	CBSCS	W 13–10	31,097	
October 31	3:30 p.m.	Temple	Navy–Marine Corps Memorial Stadium; Annapolis, MD	CBSCS	L 24–27	28,305	
November 7	2:30 p.m.	at No. 19 Notre Dame	Notre Dame Stadium; Notre Dame, IN (rivalry)	NBC	W 23–21	80,795	
November 14	3:30 p.m.	Delaware	Navy-Marine Corps Memorial Stadium; Annapolis, MD	CBSCS	W 35–18	34,223	
November 28	10:30 p.m.	at Hawaii	Aloha Stadium; Honolulu, HI	ESPNU	L 17–24	40,643	
December 12	2:30 p.m.	vs. Army	Lincoln Financial Field; Philadelphia, PA (Army–Navy Game)	CBS	W 17–3	69,541	
December 31	3:30 p.m.	vs. Missouri	Reliant Stadium; Houston, TX (Texas Bowl)	ESPN	W 35–13	69,441	
^{†}Homecoming; Rankings from AP Poll released prior to the game; All times are in Eastern time

== Game summaries ==
=== Notre Dame ===
Team	1	2	3	4	Total
• Navy	7	7	7	2	23
Notre Dame	0	0	7	14	21

- Date: November 7
- Location: Notre Dame Stadium • South Bend, Indiana
- Game start: 2:30 p.m. EST

Scoring summary
1	7:15	NAVY	Ricky Dobbs 1-yard run (Joe Buckley kick)	Navy 7-0
2	14:56	NAVY	Vince Murray 25-yard run (Joe Buckley kick)	Navy 14-0
3	5:03	ND	Robert Hughes 1-yard run (Nick Tausch kick)	Navy 14-7
3	3:29	NAVY	Greg Jones 52-yard pass from Ricky Dobbs (Joe Buckley kick)	Navy 21-7
4	4:46	ND	Michael Floyd 12-yard pass from Jimmy Clausen (Nick Tausch kick)	Navy 21-14
4	1:00	NAVY	Safety, Jimmy Clausen tackled by Craig Schaefer in end zone	Navy 23-14
4	:24	ND	Golden Tate 31-yard pass from Jimmy Clausen (Nick Tausch kick)	Navy 23-21

=== Vs. Army ===
Army Black Knights (5–6) vs. Navy Midshipmen (8–4)

Quarter	1	2	3	4	Total
Army	3	0	0	0	3
Navy	0	0	10	7	17

at Lincoln Financial Field, Philadelphia, Pennsylvania

- Date: December 12
- Game time: 2:30 p.m. EST
- Game weather: Sunny, 39 °F (4 °C)
- Game attendance: 69,541
- Referee: Brad Allen
- TV: CBS
- Box Score

Game information

First quarter

- ARMY – Alex Carlton 25-yard field goal, 0:00. Army 3–0. Drive: 4 plays, 6 yards, 1:19.

Second quarter

- No scoring

Third quarter

- NAVY – Marcus Curry 25-yard pass from Ricky Dobbs (Joe Buckley kick), 8:55. Navy 7–3. Drive: 11 plays, 68 yards, 6:05.
- NAVY – Joe Buckley 36-yard field goal, 0:11. Navy 10–3. Drive: 12 plays, 55 yards, 6:54.

Fourth quarter

- NAVY – Ricky Dobbs 1-yard run (Joe Buckley kick), 6:15. Navy 17–3. Drive: 4 plays, 12 yards, 1:56.

Top passers

- ARMY – Trent Steelman – 7/20, 77 yards, INT
- NAVY – Ricky Dobbs – 3/7, 61 yards, TD, INT

Top rushers

- ARMY – Patrick Mealy – 13 rushes, 48 yards
- NAVY – Ricky Dobbs – 33 rushes, 116 yards, TD

Top receivers

- ARMY – Ali Villanueva – 5 receptions, 62 yards
- NAVY – Marcus Curry – 1 reception, 25 yards, TD

== Roster ==
2009 Navy Midshipmen football team roster
Players			Coaches
Offense: Pos. / # / Name / Class; QB / / Ricky Dobbs	Defense: Pos. / # / Name / Class; LB / / Ross Popsil (C)	Special teams: Pos. / # / Name / Class; K / / Joe Buckley	Head coach: Ken Niumatalolo; Coordinators/assistant coaches: Joe DuPaix (slotbacks coach); Legend: (C) Team captain; (S) Suspended; (I) Ineligible; Injured; Redshirt
