= Justin Britt =

American football player (born 1991)

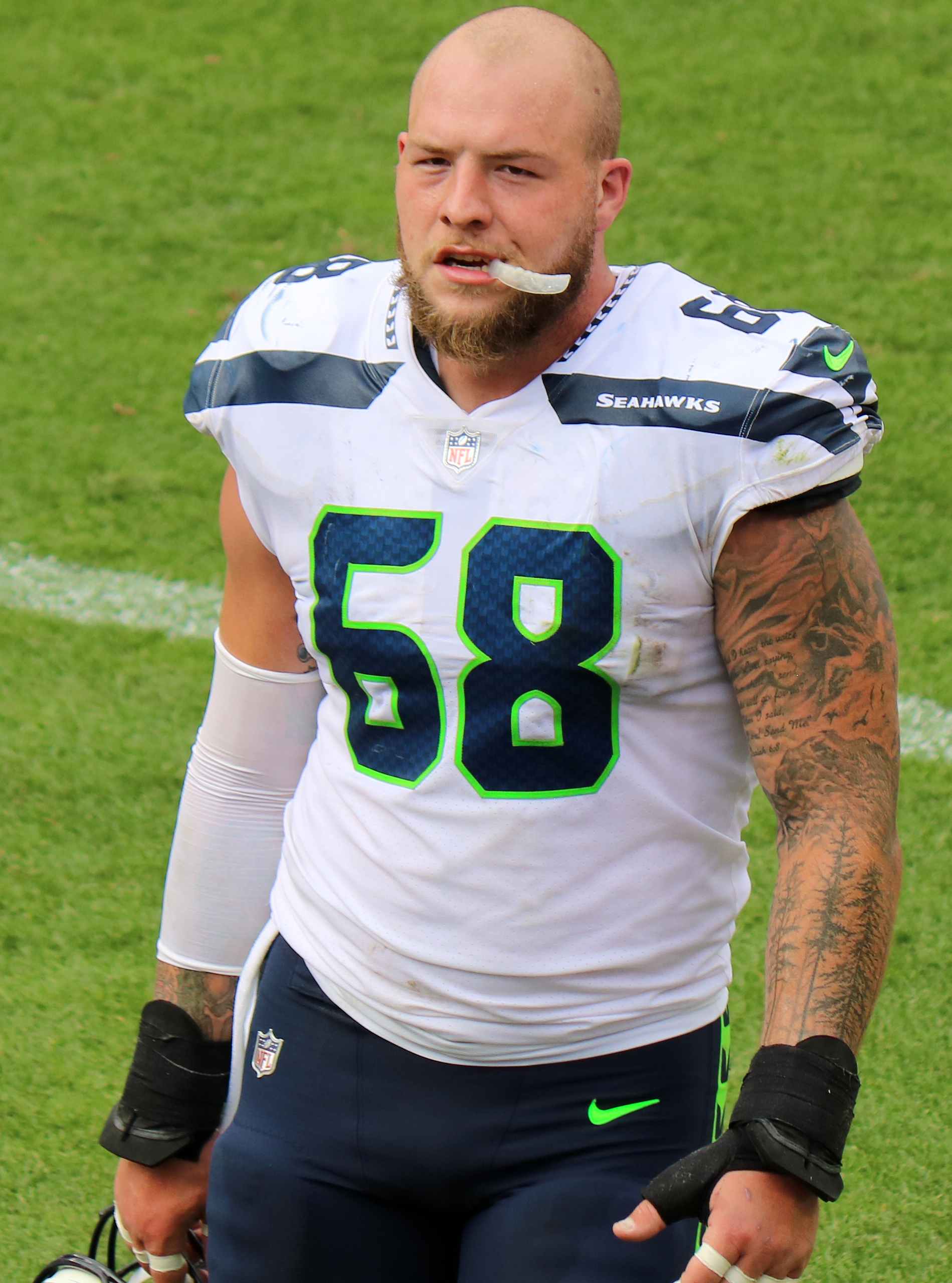
- Britt with the Seattle Seahawks in 2018

No. 68
- Position: Center

Personal information
- Born: May 29, 1991 (age 35); Fort Campbell, Kentucky, U.S.
- Listed height: 6 ft 6 in (1.98 m)
- Listed weight: 315 lb (143 kg)

Career information
- High school: Lebanon (Lebanon, Missouri)
- College: Missouri (2009–2013)
- NFL draft: 2014: 2nd round, 64th overall pick

Career history
- Seattle Seahawks (2014–2019); Houston Texans (2021–2022)

Awards and highlights
- First-team All-SEC (2013)

Career NFL statistics
- Games played: 99
- Games started: 98
- Stats at Pro Football Reference

Justin Britt (born May 29, 1991) is an American former professional football player who was a center in the National Football League (NFL). He played college football for the Missouri Tigers. He was selected by the Seattle Seahawks in the second round of the 2014 NFL draft, and also played in the NFL for the Houston Texans.

== Early life ==
Britt attended Lebanon High School in Lebanon, Missouri. He was a good overall athlete who was a three-year letterwinner in the sports of football (offensive left tackle), wrestling (heavyweight), and track. Britt won the class 4 Missouri state heavyweight championship in wrestling as a senior in 2009, going a perfect 45–0 during the season. He placed sixth at the state wrestling championships in the heavyweight division in 2008 and was a district heavyweight champion in 2008 and 2009, adding to a trio of conference titles he won in 2007, 2008 and 2009.

== College career ==
Britt played college football for the Missouri Tigers from 2010 to 2013, after being redshirted for the 2009 season.

He spent 2010 as a second string guard, before being promoted to starting left tackle for the 2011 season, starting all 13 games. He continued to be a starter in the offensive line for the remaining two seasons of his Missouri career, playing at both left and right tackle.

== Professional career ==
Pre-draft measurables
Height	Weight	Arm length	Hand span	40-yard dash	10-yard split	20-yard split	20-yard shuttle	Three-cone drill	Vertical jump	Broad jump	Bench press
6 ft 5 7/8 in (1.98 m)	325 lb (147 kg)	33 1/2 in (0.85 m)	10 1/4 in (0.26 m)	5.07 s	1.75 s	2.93 s	4.69 s	7.59 s	29.5 in (0.75 m)	9 ft 3 in (2.82 m)	26 reps
All values from NFL Combine/Pro Day

=== Seattle Seahawks ===
The Seattle Seahawks selected Britt in the second round (64th overall) of the 2014 NFL draft. He won the right tackle job in training camp in 2014, and started there in the opening game of the season against the Green Bay Packers. Britt started all 16 regular season games at right tackle for the Seahawks, as well as their divisional round playoff game against the Carolina Panthers, before missing the NFC Championship Game with an injury. He was one of the worst pass blocking tackles in the NFL as a rookie, according to Pro Football Focus. The Seahawks finished the season with a 12–4 record for an NFC West pennant, but lost to the New England Patriots in Super Bowl XLIX.

After a poor showing at right tackle in the first preseason game of the 2015 season, Britt was asked to change from right tackle to left guard. Britt was among the least effective pass blocking guards in football to start the season, but showed improvement. After being ranked 49th in pass protection, during weeks 5–10 he was ranked 33rd and weeks 11–13 he was ranked 27th. His run blocking became better as well. He started all 16 games at right guard.

In the 2016 offseason the Seahawks moved Britt again, this time to center. Head coach Pete Carroll stated that they had this move in mind when they first drafted him in 2014.

On August 17, 2017, Britt signed a three-year, $27 million contract extension with the Seahawks.

On November 12, 2018 during the Seahawks' week 10 matchup in Los Angeles, Britt engaged in a large altercation with Los Angeles Rams' defensive tackle Aaron Donald causing both benches to clear. Following the game, Donald and Britt continued to throw punches at one another. Britt was fined $20,000 for his part in the altercation.

On October 29, 2019, Britt was placed on injured reserve with a serious knee injury.

Britt was released by the Seahawks on April 27, 2020.

=== Houston Texans ===
On March 8, 2021, Britt signed with the Houston Texans. He was named the Texans starting center for 2021. He was placed on injured reserve on October 30, 2021. He was activated on December 4.

On March 21, 2022, Britt signed a two-year contract extension with the Texans. He was placed on the reserve/non-football illness list on September 20, 2022.

On March 4, 2023, the Texans released Britt. Following his release by Houston, Britt retired from professional football.
