= David Yost (American football) =

American football coach

Current position
- Title: Offensive coordinator/Quarterbacks Coach
- Team: New Mexico State
- Conference: C-USA

Biographical details
- Born: Carrollton, Ohio, U.S.
- Education: Kent State (1992)

Coaching career (HC unless noted)
- 1988–1989: Tiffin (WR)
- 1990–1995: Tiffin (OC/QB/WR)
- 1996–2000: Toledo (QB)
- 2001–2008: Missouri (QB)
- 2009–2010: Missouri (OC/QB)
- 2011–2012: Missouri (AHC/OC)
- 2013–2015: Washington State (WR)
- 2016: Oregon (PGC/QB)
- 2017–2018: Utah State (OC/QB)
- 2019–2021: Texas Tech (OC/QB)
- 2022–2024: FIU (OC/QB)
- 2025–present: New Mexico State (OC/QB)

David Yost is an American football coach. He is the offensive coordinator for the New Mexico State Aggies.

== Coaching career ==
Yost started his coaching career at Tiffin as their wide receivers coach. After one year with Tiffin, he was promoted to be the team's offensive coordinator and quarterbacks coach. After eight years with Tiffin, Yost joined Toledo as the team's quarterbacks coach, where he remained for five years. Yost was then hired to coach the quarterbacks for Missouri. After eight seasons as the Tigers quarterbacks coach, he became the team's offensive coordinator. After 12 years with Missouri, Yost resigned from his position. Yost later joined Washington State as the team's wide receiver coach for three years. Yost was then hired by Oregon to be their passing game coordinator. After one year with Oregon, Yost was hired by Utah State to fill the team's offensive coordinator and quarterbacks coach positions. In his time with Utah State, he was named a Broyles Award semifinalist in 2018 after helping the team achieve school records in points and touchdowns. After two years with Utah State, Yost was hired by Texas Tech as the team's offensive coordinator and quarterbacks coach. After two years with Texas Tech, Yost was fired. Yost then accepted a job at FIU as the offensive coordinator and quarterbacks coach.
