= 2009 Western Athletic Conference football season =

2009 WAC football season
- League: NCAA Division I Football Bowl Subdivision
- Sport: Football
- Duration: September 3, 2009 through January 4, 2010
- Teams: 9
- TV partner: ESPN

2010 NFL Draft
- Top draft pick: RB Ryan Mathews, Fresno State
- Picked by: San Diego Chargers, 12th overall

Regular Season
- Champions: Boise State
- Season MVP: QB Kellen Moore, Boise State; LB Dontay Moch, Nevada

Football seasons
- 2008 2010

2009 Western Athletic Conference football standings
| | Conf. | | | Overall |
| Team | W | | L | W | | L |
|---|---|---|---|---|---|---|
| No. 4 Boise State $% | 8 | – | 0 | 14 | – | 0 |
| Nevada | 7 | – | 1 | 8 | – | 5 |
| Fresno State | 6 | – | 2 | 8 | – | 5 |
| Idaho | 4 | – | 4 | 8 | – | 5 |
| Hawaii | 3 | – | 5 | 6 | – | 7 |
| Louisiana Tech | 3 | – | 5 | 4 | – | 8 |
| Utah State | 3 | – | 5 | 4 | – | 8 |
| New Mexico State | 1 | – | 7 | 3 | – | 10 |
| San Jose State | 1 | – | 7 | 2 | – | 10 |
% – BCS at-large representative; $ – Conference champion; Rankings from AP Poll

The 2009 Western Athletic Conference (WAC) football season was an NCAA football season played from September 3, 2009, to January 4, 2010. The Western Athletic Conference consists of 9 members: Boise State, Fresno State, Hawai'i, Idaho, Louisiana Tech, Nevada, New Mexico State, San Jose State, and Utah State. Boise State won the 2009 WAC title going 13–0, 8–0 in conference and were invited to play in the Fiesta Bowl, in which they defeated previously unbeaten TCU. Nevada, Fresno State, and Idaho also played in bowl games, the Hawaiʻi Bowl, New Mexico Bowl, and Humanitarian Bowl, respectively. Nevada lost to SMU and Fresno State lost to Wyoming, while Idaho beat Bowling Green.

== Preseason ==
=== Preseason poll ===
The 2009 WAC preseason poll was announced at the league's football preview in Salt Lake City on July 29. Boise State was overwhelmingly selected as the favorite to win the conference by both the league's coaches and media that cover the WAC. Although the Broncos did not receive all first-place votes in the coaches' poll, their selection was effectively unanimous; league rules prohibit coaches from casting first-place votes for their own teams. Accordingly, Broncos head coach Chris Petersen voted for Nevada.

==== Coaches poll ====
1. Boise State – 64 (8)
2. Nevada – 55 (1)
3. Fresno State – 45
4. Louisiana Tech – 45
5. Hawaiʻi – 36
6. San Jose State – 34
7. Utah State – 21
8. New Mexico State – 13
9. Idaho – 11

==== Media poll ====
1. Boise State – 519 (55)
2. Nevada – 444 (3)
3. Fresno State – 365
4. Louisiana Tech – 360
5. Hawai'i – 275
6. San Jose State – 263
7. Utah State – 170
8. Idaho – 110
9. New Mexico State – 104

Colin Kaepernick of Nevada was voted the preseason Offensive Player of the Year and Kyle Wilson of Boise State was voted the preseason Defensive player of the year.

=== Award watch lists ===
| Award | School | Player |
|---|---|---|
| Bronko Nagurski Trophy | Boise State | Kyle Wilson |
| Bronko Nagurski Trophy | Nevada | Kevin Basped |
| Dave Rimington Trophy | Boise State | Thomas Byrd |
| Dave Rimington Trophy | Fresno State | Joe Bernardi |
| Dave Rimington Trophy | Hawaiʻi | John Estes |
| Dave Rimington Trophy | Louisiana Tech | Lon Roberts |
| Lombardi Award | Boise State | Ryan Winterswyk |
| Lombardi Award | Fresno State | Ben Jacobs |
| Lombardi Award | Fresno State | Andrew Jackson |
| Lombardi Award | Idaho | Mike Iupati |
| Lombardi Award | Louisiana Tech | Rob McGill |
| Lombardi Award | Louisiana Tech | D'Anthony Smith |
| Lombardi Award | Nevada | Kevin Basped |
| Lombardi Award | Nevada | Alonzo Durham |
| Lombardi Award | Nevada | Virgil Green |
| Lombardi Award | San Jose State | Justin Cole |
| Lombardi Award | San Jose State | Carl Ihenacho |
| Lombardi Award | Utah State | Paul Igboeli |
| Manning Award | Boise State | Kellen Moore |
| Manning Award | Nevada | Colin Kaepernick |
| Maxwell Award | Boise State | Kellen Moore |
| Maxwell Award | Nevada | Colin Kaepernick |
| Lou Groza Award | Boise State | Kyle Brotzman |
| Lou Groza Award | Fresno State | Kevin Goessling |
| Outland Trophy | Idaho | Mike Iupati |
| Fred Biletnikoff Award | Fresno State | Seyi Ajirotutu |
| Fred Biletnikoff Award | Hawai'i | Greg Salas |
| Walter Camp Award | Boise State | Kellen Moore |
| Jim Thorpe Award | Boise State | Kyle Wilson |
| Jim Thorpe Award | San Jose State | Duke Ihenacho |
| Bednarik Award | Boise State | Kyle Wilson |
| Doak Walker Award | Louisiana Tech | Daniel Porter |
| Doak Walker Award | Nevada | Vai Taua |
| Davey O'Brien Award | Boise State | Kellen Moore |
| Davey O'Brien Award | Nevada | Colin Kaepernick |

Mike Iupati of Idaho was one of three finalists named for the Outland Trophy, won by Ndamukong Suh of Nebraska.

Kellen Moore of Boise State was named one of the ten finalists for the Manning Award, won by Colt McCoy of Texas.

== Regular season ==
Index to colors and formatting
WAC member won
WAC member lost
WAC teams in **bold**

The WAC has teams in 4 different time zones. Times reflect start time in respective time zone of each team (Central-Louisiana Tech, Mountain-New Mexico State, Boise State, Utah State, Pacific-Idaho, Fresno State, San Jose State, Nevada, Hawaiian-Hawai'i). Conference games start times are that of the home team.

Rankings reflect that of the USA Today Coaches poll for that week until week eight when the BCS poll will be used.

=== Week one ===
| Date | Time | Visiting team | Home team | Site | TV | Result | Attendance |
|---|---|---|---|---|---|---|---|
| September 3 | 7:00 p.m. | **Utah State** | #18 Utah | Rice-Eccles Stadium • Salt Lake City | The Mtn. | **L** 17–35 | 45,333 |
| September 3 | 8:15 p.m. | # 14 Oregon | #16 **Boise State** | Bronco Stadium • Boise, Idaho | ESPN | **W** 19–8 | 34,127 |
| September 4 | 7:00 p.m. | Central Arkansas | **Hawai'i** | Aloha Stadium • Honolulu | | **W** 25–20 | 33,298 |
| September 5 | 12:30 p.m. | **San Jose State** | #4 USC | Los Angeles Memorial Coliseum • Los Angeles | FSN | **L** 3–56 | 84,325 |
| September 5 | 12:30 p.m. | **Nevada** | #23 Notre Dame | Notre Dame Stadium • Notre Dame, Indiana | NBC | **L** 0–35 | 80,795 |
| September 5 | 5:00 p.m. | **Idaho** | **New Mexico State** | Aggie Memorial Stadium • Las Cruces, New Mexico | | **IDA** 21–6 | 16,772 |
| September 5 | 6:00 p.m. | **Louisiana Tech** | Auburn | Jordan–Hare Stadium • Auburn, Alabama | ESPNU | **L** 13–37 | 81,143 |
| September 5 | 7:00 p.m. | UC Davis | **Fresno State** | Bulldog Stadium • Fresno, California | | **W** 51–0 | 37,267 |

Players of the week:

| Offensive | | Defensive | | Special teams | |
| Player | Team | Player | Team | Player | Team |
|---|---|---|---|---|---|
| Greg Salas | Hawai'i | Nico Herron | Fresno State | Bobby Cowan | Idaho |

=== Week two ===
| Date | Time | Visiting team | Home team | Site | TV | Result | Attendance |
|---|---|---|---|---|---|---|---|
| September 12 | 9:00 a.m. | **Fresno State** | Wisconsin | Camp Randall Stadium • Madison, Wisconsin | ESPN | **L** 31–34–2OT | 80,353 |
| September 12 | 12:30 p.m. | **Idaho** | Washington | Husky Stadium • Seattle | FSN | **L** 23–42 | 58,980 |
| September 12 | 2:00 p.m. | **Hawai'i** | Washington State | Qwest Field • Seattle | | **W** 38–20 | 42,912 |
| September 12 | 2:30 p.m. | **Louisiana Tech** | Navy | Navy–Marine Corps Memorial Stadium • Annapolis, Maryland | CBS College Sports | **L** 14–32 | 29,102 |
| September 12 | 6:00 p.m. | Miami (OH) | #11 **Boise State** | Bronco Stadium • Boise, Idaho | | **W** 48–0 | 32,228 |
| September 12 | 7:30 p.m. | #17 Utah | **San Jose State** | Spartan Stadium • San Jose, California | ESPNU | **L** 14–24 | 23,684 |
| September 12 | 6:00 p.m. | Prairie View A&M | **New Mexico State** | Aggie Memorial Stadium • Las Cruces, New Mexico | | **W** 21–18 | 15,902 |

Players of the week:

| Offensive | | Defensive | | Special teams | |
| Player | Team | Player | Team | Player | Team |
|---|---|---|---|---|---|
| Greg Alexander | Hawai'i | Corey Paredes | Hawai'i | Philip Livas | Louisiana Tech |

=== Week three ===
| Date | Time | Visiting team | Home team | Site | TV | Result | Attendance |
|---|---|---|---|---|---|---|---|
| September 18 | 6:00 p.m. | #10 **Boise State** | **Fresno State** | Bulldog Stadium • Fresno, California | ESPN | **BSU** 51–34 | 35,637 |
| September 19 | 2:00 p.m. | **Nevada** | Colorado State | Sonny Lubick Field at Hughes Stadium • Fort Collins, Colorado | | **L** 20–35 | 24,967 |
| September 19 | 2:00 p.m. | San Diego State | **Idaho** | Kibbie Dome • Moscow, Idaho | | **W** 34–20 | 10,324 |
| September 19 | 5:00 p.m. | **Utah State** | Texas A&M | Kyle Field • College Station, Texas | | **L** 30–38 | 73,599 |
| September 19 | 5:00 p.m. | **Hawai'i** | UNLV | Sam Boyd Stadium • Las Vegas | CBS College Sports | **L** 33–34 | 29,717 |
| September 19 | 6:00 p.m. | Nicholls State | **Louisiana Tech** | Joe Aillet Stadium • Ruston, Louisiana | | **W** 48–13 | 19,400 |
| September 19 | 6:00 p.m. | **San Jose State** | Stanford | Stanford Stadium • Stanford, California | | **L** 17–42 | 33,560 |
| September 19 | 6:00 p.m. | UTEP | **New Mexico State** | Aggie Memorial Stadium • Las Cruises, New Mexico | | **L** 12–38 | 20,439 |

Players of the week:

| Offensive | | Defensive | | Special teams | |
| Player | Team | Player | Team | Player | Team |
|---|---|---|---|---|---|
| Ryan Mathews | Fresno State | JoJo Dickson | Idaho | Titus Young | Boise State |

=== Week four ===
| Date | Time | Visiting team | Home team | Site | TV | Result | Attendance |
|---|---|---|---|---|---|---|---|
| September 25 | 6:00 p.m. | #21 Missouri | **Nevada** | Mackay Stadium • Reno, Nevada | ESPN | **L** 21–32 | 18,269 |
| September 26 | 9:00 a.m. | **Fresno State** | #15 Cincinnati | Nippert Stadium • Cincinnati | | **L** 20–28 | 32,910 |
| September 26 | 12:30 p.m. | **Idaho** | Northern Illinois | Huskie Stadium • DeKalb, Illinois | | **W** 34–31 | 16,320 |
| September 26 | 5:00 p.m. | #8 **Boise State** | Bowling Green | Doyt Perry Stadium • Bowling Green, Ohio | | **W** 49–14 | 22,396 |
| September 26 | 6:00 p.m. | Southern Utah | **Utah State** | Romney Stadium • Logan, Utah | | **W** 53–34 | 18,472 |
| September 26 | 5:00 p.m. | Cal Poly | **San Jose State** | Spartan Stadium • San Jose, California | | **W** 19–9 | 13,510 |
| September 26 | 8:00 p.m. | **New Mexico State** | New Mexico | University Stadium • Albuquerque, New Mexico | The Mtn. | **W** 20–17 | 35,248 |

Players of the week:

| Offensive | | Defensive | | Special teams | |
| Player | Team | Player | Team | Player | Team |
|---|---|---|---|---|---|
| Nathan Enderle | Idaho | Tanner Burns | San Jose State | Kyle Hughes | New Mexico State |

=== Week five ===
| Date | Time | Visiting team | Home team | Site | TV | Result | Attendance |
|---|---|---|---|---|---|---|---|
| September 30 | 7:00 p.m. | **Hawai'i** | **Louisiana Tech** | Joe Aillet Stadium • Ruston, Louisiana | ESPN2 | **LT** 27–6 | 21,263 |
| October 2 | 7:00 p.m. | **Utah State** | #21 BYU | LaVell Edwards Stadium • Provo, Utah | The Mtn. | **L** 17–35 | 64,103 |
| October 3 | 1:00 p.m. | UNLV | **Nevada** | Mackay Stadium • Reno, Nevada | | **W** 63–28 | 24,078 |
| October 3 | 6:00 p.m. | UC Davis | #5 **Boise State** | Bronco Stadium • Boise, Idaho | | **W** 34–16 | 32,497 |
| October 3 | 6:00 p.m. | **New Mexico State** | San Diego State | Qualcomm Stadium • San Diego, California | | **L** 17–34 | 21,184 |
| October 3 | 7:30 p.m. | Colorado State | **Idaho** | Kibbie Dome • Moscow, Idaho | ESPNU | **W** 31–29 | 16,000 |

Players of the week:

| Offensive | | Defensive | | Special teams | |
| Player | Team | Player | Team | Player | Team |
|---|---|---|---|---|---|
| Mike Ball | Nevada | Shiloh Keo | Idaho | Trey Farquhar | Idaho |

=== Week six ===
| Date | Time | Visiting team | Home team | Site | TV | Result | Attendance |
|---|---|---|---|---|---|---|---|
| October 9 | 6:00 p.m. | **Louisiana Tech** | **Nevada** | Mackay Stadium • Reno, Nevada | ESPN | **NEV** 37–14 | 11,975 |
| October 10 | 5:00 p.m. | **Idaho** | **San Jose State** | Spartan Stadium • San Jose, California | | **IDA** 29–25 | 15,321 |
| October 10 | 6:00 p.m. | **Utah State** | **New Mexico State** | Aggie Memorial Stadium • Las Cruises, New Mexico | | **NMSU** 20–17 | 15,283 |
| October 10 | 6:00 p.m. | **Fresno State** | **Hawai'i** | Aloha Stadium • Honolulu, HI | | **FRES** 42–17 | 38,566 |

Players of the week:

| Offensive | | Defensive | | Special teams | |
| Player | Team | Player | Team | Player | Team |
|---|---|---|---|---|---|
| Colin Kaepernick | Nevada | Desia Dunn | Fresno State | Marcus Anderson | New Mexico State |

=== Week seven ===
| Date | Time | Visiting team | Home team | Site | TV | Result | Attendance |
|---|---|---|---|---|---|---|---|
| October 14 | 6:00 p.m. | #6 **Boise State** | Tulsa | Chapman Stadium • Tulsa, Oklahoma | ESPN | **W** 28–21 | 30,000 |
| October 17 | 1:00 p.m. | **Nevada** | **Utah State** | Romney Stadium • Logan, Utah | | **NEV** 35–32 | 15,103 |
| October 17 | 2:00 p.m. | **Hawai'i** | **Idaho** | Kibbie Dome • Moscow, Idaho | | **IDA** 35–23 | 12,763 |
| October 17 | 3:00 p.m. | **New Mexico State** | **Louisiana Tech** | Joe Aillet Stadium • Ruston, Louisiana | | **LT** 45–7 | 20,773 |
| October 17 | 7:00 p.m. | **San Jose State** | **Fresno State** | Bulldog Stadium • Fresno, California | | **FRES** 41–21 | 35,495 |

Players of the week:

| Offensive | | Defensive | | Special teams | |
| Player | Team | Player | Team | Player | Team |
|---|---|---|---|---|---|
| Ryan Mathews | Fresno State | Aaron Lavarias | Idaho | Robert Malone | Fresno State |

=== Week eight ===
| Date | Time | Visiting team | Home team | Site | TV | Result | Attendance |
|---|---|---|---|---|---|---|---|
| October 24 | 1:00 p.m. | **Louisiana Tech** | **Utah State** | Romney Stadium • Logan, Utah | | **USU** 23–21 | 14,229 |
| October 24 | 1:00 p.m. | **Idaho** | **Nevada** | Mackay Stadium • Reno, Nevada | | **NEV** 70–45 | 16,611 |
| October 24 | 6:00 p.m. | #4 **Boise State** | **Hawai'i** | Aloha Stadium • Honolulu | | **BSU** 54–9 | 37,928 |
| October 24 | 8:15 p.m. | **Fresno State** | **New Mexico State** | Aggie Memorial Stadium • Las Cruces, New Mexico | ESPNU | **FRES** 34–3 | 18,893 |

Players of the week:

| Offensive | | Defensive | | Special teams | |
| Player | Team | Player | Team | Player | Team |
|---|---|---|---|---|---|
| Colin Kaepernick | Nevada | Jeron Johnson | Boise State | Kyle Brotzman | Boise State |

=== Week nine ===
| Date | Time | Visiting team | Home team | Site | TV | Result | Attendance |
|---|---|---|---|---|---|---|---|
| October 31 | 10:00 a.m. | **New Mexico State** | #17 Ohio State | Ohio Stadium • Columbus, Ohio | Big Ten Network | **L** 0–45 | 104,719 |
| October 31 | 1:00 p.m. | **San Jose State** | #7 **Boise State** | Bronco Stadium • Boise, Idaho | | **BSU** 45–7 | 31,684 |
| October 31 | 1:00 p.m. | **Hawai'i** | **Nevada** | Mackay Stadium • Reno, Nevada | | **NEV** 31–21 | 13,889 |
| October 31 | 2:00 p.m. | **Louisiana Tech** | **Idaho** | Kibbie Dome • Moscow, Idaho | | **IDA** 35–34 | 15,236 |
| October 31 | 2:00 p.m. | **Utah State** | **Fresno State** | Bulldog Stadium • Fresno, California | | **FRES** 31–27 | 27,721 |

Players of the week:

| Offensive | | Defensive | | Special teams | |
| Player | Team | Player | Team | Player | Team |
|---|---|---|---|---|---|
| Ryan Mathews | Fresno State | Kyle Wilson | Boise State | Justin Veltung | Idaho |

=== Week ten ===
| Date | Time | Visiting team | Home team | Site | TV | Result | Attendance |
|---|---|---|---|---|---|---|---|
| November 6 | 7:00 p.m. | #7 **Boise State** | **Louisiana Tech** | Joe Aillet Stadium • Ruston, Louisiana | ESPN2 | **BSU** 45–35 | 23,240 |
| November 7 | 6:00 p.m. | **Utah State** | **Hawai'i** | Aloha Stadium • Honolulu, HI | | **HAW** 49–36 | 31,499 |
| November 7 | 7:15 p.m. | **Fresno State** | **Idaho** | Kibbie Dome • Moscow, Idaho | ESPNU | **FRES** 31–21 | 12,418 |
| November 8 | 5:30 p.m. | **Nevada** | **San Jose State** | Spartan Stadium • San Jose, California | ESPN | **NEV** 62–7 | 11,103 |

Players of the week:

| Offensive | | Defensive | | Special teams | |
| Player | Team | Player | Team | Player | Team |
|---|---|---|---|---|---|
| Leon Wright-Jackson | Hawai'i | Lorne Bell | Fresno State | Kevin Goessling | Fresno State |

=== Week eleven ===
| Date | Time | Visiting team | Home team | Site | TV | Result | Attendance |
|---|---|---|---|---|---|---|---|
| November 14 | 1:00 p.m. | **San Jose State** | **Utah State** | Romney Stadium • Logan, Utah | | **USU** 24–9 | 13,276 |
| November 14 | 1:00 p.m. | **Fresno State** | **Nevada** | Mackay Stadium • Reno, Nevada | | **NEV** 52–14 | 19,331 |
| November 14 | 1:30 p.m. | **Idaho** | #6 **Boise State** | Bronco Stadium • Boise, Idaho | ESPNU | **BSU** 63–25 | 33,986 |
| November 14 | 6:00 p.m. | **New Mexico State** | **Hawai'i** | Aloha Stadium • Honolulu, HI | | **HAW** 24–6 | 32,628 |
| November 14 | 7:00 p.m. | **Louisiana Tech** | #8 LSU | Tiger Stadium • Baton Rouge, Louisiana | ESPNU | **L** 16–24 | 92,584 |

Players of the week:

| Offensive | | Defensive | | Special teams | |
| Player | Team | Player | Team | Player | Team |
|---|---|---|---|---|---|
| Austin Pettis | Boise State | Jonathon Amaya | Nevada | Titus Young | Boise State |

=== Week twelve ===
| Date | Time | Visiting team | Home team | Site | TV | Result | Attendance |
|---|---|---|---|---|---|---|---|
| November 20 | 7:30 p.m. | #6 **Boise State** | **Utah State** | Romney Stadium • Logan, Utah | ESPN2 | **BSU** 52–21 | 18,777 |
| November 21 | 2:00 p.m. | **Louisiana Tech** | **Fresno State** | Bulldog Stadium • Fresno, California | | **FRES** 30–28 | 31,769 |
| November 21 | 5:00 p.m. | **Nevada** | **New Mexico State** | Aggie Memorial Stadium • Las Cruises, New Mexico | ESPNU | **NEV** 63–20 | 11,775 |
| November 21 | 5:00 p.m. | **Hawai'i** | **San Jose State** | Spartan Stadium • San Jose, California | | **HAW** 17–10 OT | 18,327 |

Players of the week:

| Offensive | | Defensive | | Special teams | |
| Player | Team | Player | Team | Player | Team |
|---|---|---|---|---|---|
| Doug Martin | Boise State | Ben Jacobs | Fresno State | Kevin Goessling | Fresno State |

=== Week thirteen ===
| Date | Time | Visiting team | Home team | Site | TV | Result | Attendance |
|---|---|---|---|---|---|---|---|
| November 27 | 8:00 p.m. | **Nevada** | #6 **Boise State** | Bronco Stadium • Boise, Idaho | ESPN2 | **BSU** 44–33 | 32,642 |
| November 28 | 2:00 p.m. | **Utah State** | **Idaho** | Kibbie Dome • Moscow, Idaho | | **USU** 52–49 | 8,532 |
| November 28 | 5:00 p.m. | **New Mexico State** | **San Jose State** | Spartan Stadium • San Jose, California | | **SJSU** 13–10 | 10,117 |
| November 28 | 6:00 p.m. | Navy | **Hawai'i** | Aloha Stadium • Honolulu, HI | ESPNU | **W** 24–17 | 40,643 |

Players of the week:

| Offensive | | Defensive | | Special teams | |
| Player | Team | Player | Team | Player | Team |
|---|---|---|---|---|---|
| Robert Turbin | Utah State | Blaze Soares | Hawai'i | Titus Young | Boise State |

=== Week fourteen ===
| Date | Time | Visiting team | Home team | Site | TV | Result | Attendance |
|---|---|---|---|---|---|---|---|
| December 5 | 9:30 a.m. | **Fresno State** | Illinois | Memorial Stadium • Champaign, Illinois | Big Ten Network | **W** 53–52 | 48,538 |
| December 5 | 1:00 p.m. | **San Jose State** | **Louisiana Tech** | Joe Aillet Stadium • Ruston, Louisiana | | **LT** 55–20 | 15,324 |
| December 5 | 1:00 p.m. | **New Mexico State** | #6 **Boise State** | Bronco Stadium • Boise, Idaho | | **BSU** 42–7 | 32,308 |
| December 5 | 6:30 p.m. | Wisconsin | **Hawai'i** | Aloha Stadium • Honolulu, HI | ESPN2 | **L** 10–52 | 40,069 |

Players of the week:

| Offensive | | Defensive | | Special teams | |
| Player | Team | Player | Team | Player | Team |
|---|---|---|---|---|---|
| Daniel Porter | La Tech | Tank Calais | La Tech | Alex Dunnachie | Hawai'i |

== Records against other conferences ==
| Conference | Wins | Losses |
|---|---|---|
| Big 12 | 0 | 2 |
| Big East | 0 | 1 |
| Big Ten | 1 | 3 |
| CUSA | 1 | 1 |
| Independents | 1 | 2 |
| MAC | 3 | 0 |
| Mountain West | 4 | 6 |
| Pac-10 | 2 | 3 |
| SEC | 0 | 2 |
| All FCS | 7 | 0 |
| Overall | 19 | 20 |

== All-WAC Teams ==
=== First Team ===
Offense
QB Kellen Moore- Boise State
RB Ryan Mathews- Fresno State
RB Vai Taua- Nevada
WR Austin Pettis- Boise State
WR Titus Young- Boise State
WR Greg Salas- Hawai'i
TE Dennis Morris- La Tech
OL Nate Potter- Boise State
OL Andrew Jackson- Fresno State
OL John Estes- Hawai'i
OL Mike Iupati- Idaho
OL Alonzo Durham- Nevada

Defense
DL Ryan Winterswyk- Boise State
DL Chris Carter- Fresno State
DL D'Anthony Smith- La Tech
DL Dontay Moch- Nevada
LB Ben Jacobs- Fresno State
LB Blaze Soares- Hawai'i
LB Adrien Cole- La Tech
LB Bobby Wagner- Utah State
DB Kyle Wilson- Boise State
DB Shiloh Keo- Idaho
DB Davon House- New Mexico State
DB Duke Ihenacho- San Jose State

Specialists
PK Kevin Goessling- Fresno State
P Robert Malone- Fresno State
ST Titus Young- Boise State

=== Second Team ===
Offense
QB Colin Kaepernick- Nevada
RB Jeremy Avery- Boise State
RB Daniel Porter- La Tech
RB Robert Turbin- Utah State
WR Seyi Ajirotutu- Fresno State
WR Max Komar- Idaho
WR Brandon Wimberly- Nevada
WR Kevin Jurovich- San Jose State
TE Virgil Green- Nevada
OL Kenny Wiggins- Fresno State
OL Aaron Kia- Hawai'i
OL Irv Stevens- Idaho
OL Rob McGill- La Tech
OL Kenneth Ackerman- Nevada

Defense
DL Billy Winn- Boise State
DL Aaron Lavarias- Idaho
DL Kevin Basped- Nevada
DL Carl Ihenacho- San Jose State
LB Winston Venable- Boise State
LB JoJo Dickson- Idaho
LB James-Michael Johnson- Nevada
LB Justin Cole- San Jose State
DB Jeron Johnson- Boise State
DB Lorne Bell- Fresno State
DB Moses Harris- Fresno State
DB Jonathon Amaya- Nevada

Specialists
PK Trey Farquhar- Idaho
P Philip Zavala- San Jose State
ST Phillip Livas- La Tech

=== Players of the year ===
Offense
Kellen Moore- Boise State

Defense
Dontay Moch- Nevada

Freshman
Brandon Wimberly- Nevada

=== Coach of the year ===
Chris Petersen- Boise State

== Rankings ==
During the 2009 season the only WAC team to be ranked was Boise State, who would finish the season ranked #4.

Ranking movements of Boise State Legend: ██ Increase in ranking ██ Decrease in ranking ( ) = First-place votes
| | Week | | | | | | | | | | | | | | | |
| Poll | Pre | 1 | 2 | 3 | 4 | 5 | 6 | 7 | 8 | 9 | 10 | 11 | 12 | 13 | 14 | Final |
|---|---|---|---|---|---|---|---|---|---|---|---|---|---|---|---|---|
| AP | 14 | 12 | 10 | 8 | 5 | 6 | 5 | 6 | 6 | 5 | 6 | 6 | 6 | 6 | 6 | 4 |
| Coaches | 16 | 11 | 10 | 8 | 5 | 6 | 6 | 5 | 5 | 5 | 6 | 6 | 6 | 6 | 6 | 4 |
| Harris | Not released | | | | 5 | 5 | 5 | 5 | 5 | 4 (1) | 6 | 6 | 6 | 6 | 6 | Not released |
| BCS | Not released | | | | | | | 4 | 7 | 7 | 6 | 6 | 6 | 6 | 6 | Not released |

== Bowl games ==
| Bowl Game | Date | Stadium | City | Television | Matchup/Result | Attendance |
|---|---|---|---|---|---|---|
| New Mexico Bowl | December 19, 2009 | University Stadium | Albuquerque, New Mexico | ESPN | Wyoming 35, Fresno State 28, 2OT | 24,898 |
| Sheraton Hawaiʻi Bowl | December 24, 2009 | Aloha Stadium | Honolulu, HI | ESPN | SMU 45, Nevada 10 | 32,650 |
| Roady's Humanitarian Bowl | December 30, 2009 | Bronco Stadium | Boise, Idaho | ESPN | Idaho 43, Bowling Green 42 | 26,726 |
| Tostitos Fiesta Bowl | January 4, 2010 | University of Phoenix Stadium | Glendale, Arizona | Fox | #6 Boise State 17, #4 TCU 10 | 73,227 |

== Attendance ==
| Team | Stadium (Capacity) | Game 1 | Game 2 | Game 3 | Game 4 | Game 5 | Game 6 | Game 7 | Total | Average | % of Capacity |
|---|---|---|---|---|---|---|---|---|---|---|---|
| Boise State | Bronco Stadium (33,500) | 34,127 | 32,228 | 32,497 | 31,684 | 33,986 | 32,642 | 32,308 | 229,472 | 32,782 | 97.9 |
| Fresno State | Bulldog Stadium (41,031) | 37,267 | 35,637 | 35,495 | 27,721 | 31,769 | | | 167,889 | 33,578 | 81.8 |
| Hawai'i | Aloha Stadium (50,000) | 33,298 | 38,566 | 37,928 | 31,499 | 32,628 | 40,643 | 40,069 | 254,631 | 36,376 | 72.8 |
| Idaho | Kibbie Dome (16,000) | 10,324 | 16,000 | 12,763 | 15,236 | 12,418 | 8,532 | | 75,273 | 12,546 | 78.4 |
| Louisiana Tech | Joe Aillet Stadium (30,600) | 19,400 | 21,263 | 20,773 | 23,240 | 15,324 | | | 99,970 | 19,994 | 65.3 |
| Nevada | Mackay Stadium (29,993) | 18,269 | 24,078 | 11,975 | 16,611 | 13,889 | 19,331 | | 104,153 | 17,359 | 57.9 |
| New Mexico State | Aggie Memorial Stadium (30,343) | 16,772 | 15,902 | 20,439 | 15,283 | 18,893 | 11,775 | | 93,084 | 15,511 | 51.1 |
| San Jose State | Spartan Stadium (31,218) | 23,684 | 13,510 | 15,321 | 11,103 | 18,327 | 10,117 | | 92,062 | 15,344 | 49.2 |
| Utah State | Romney Stadium (25,513) | 18,472 | 15,103 | 14,229 | 13,276 | 18,777 | | | 79,857 | 15,971 | 62.6 |

== Expanded WAC standings ==
Western Athletic Conference
| | Conf | | Overall | | | | |
| Team – Bowl Game | W | L | W | L | PF | PA | STREAK |
| #4 Boise State – Fiesta Bowl | 8 | 0 | 14 | 0 | 591 | 240 | W 14 |
| Nevada – Hawai'i Bowl | 7 | 1 | 8 | 5 | 497 | 371 | L 2 |
| Fresno State – New Mexico Bowl | 6 | 2 | 8 | 5 | 440 | 369 | L 1 |
| Idaho – Humanitarian Bowl | 4 | 4 | 8 | 5 | 425 | 468 | W 1 |
| Hawaiʻi | 3 | 5 | 6 | 7 | 296 | 384 | L 1 |
| Louisiana Tech | 3 | 5 | 4 | 8 | 350 | 309 | W 1 |
| Utah State | 3 | 5 | 4 | 8 | 349 | 408 | W 1 |
| New Mexico State | 1 | 7 | 3 | 10 | 149 | 411 | L 7 |
| San Jose State | 1 | 7 | 2 | 10 | 165 | 414 | L 1 |

== NFL draft ==
The following list includes all WAC players who were drafted in the 2010 NFL draft.

| Round # | Pick # | NFL team | Player | Position | College |
|---|---|---|---|---|---|
| 1 | 12 | San Diego Chargers | Ryan Mathews | RB | Fresno State |
| 1 | 17 | San Francisco 49ers | Mike Iupati | G | Idaho |
| 1 | 29 | New York Jets | Kyle Wilson | CB | Boise State |
| 3 | 74 | Jacksonville Jaguars | D'Anthony Smith | DT | Louisiana Tech |
| 6 | 174 | Washington Redskins | Dennis Morris | TE | Louisiana Tech |
