= 2009 Louisiana Tech Bulldogs football team =

American college football season

2009 Louisiana Tech Bulldogs football
- Conference: Western Athletic Conference
- Record: 4–8 (3–5 WAC)
- Head coach: Derek Dooley (3rd season)
- Offensive coordinator: Frank Scelfo (3rd season)
- Offensive scheme: Multiple pro-style
- Defensive coordinator: Tommy Spangler (3rd season)
- Base defense: 4–3
- Captains: Thomas Graham; Rob McGill; D'Anthony Smith
- Home stadium: Joe Aillet Stadium

2009 Western Athletic Conference football standings
	Conf.			Overall
Team	W		L	W		L
No. 4 Boise State $%	8	–	0	14	–	0
Nevada	7	–	1	8	–	5
Fresno State	6	–	2	8	–	5
Idaho	4	–	4	8	–	5
Hawaii	3	–	5	6	–	7
Louisiana Tech	3	–	5	4	–	8
Utah State	3	–	5	4	–	8
New Mexico State	1	–	7	3	–	10
San Jose State	1	–	7	2	–	10
% – BCS at-large representative; $ – Conference champion; Rankings from AP Poll

The 2009 Louisiana Tech Bulldogs football team represented Louisiana Tech University as a member of the Western Athletic Conference (WAC) during the 2009 NCAA Division I FBS football season. Led by third-year head coach Derek Dooley, the Bulldogs played their home games at Joe Aillet Stadium in Ruston, Louisiana. Louisiana Tech finished the season with a record of 4–8 overall and a mark of 3–5 in conference play, tying for fifth place in the WAC.

== Before the season ==
=== Recruiting ===
College recruiting information (2009)
Name	Hometown	School	Height	Weight	40^{‡}	Commit date
Chad Boyd; CB	Westwego, LA	Shaw	5 ft 10 in (1.78 m)	184 lb (83 kg)	4.64	Jan 14, 2009
Chad Boyd; CB	Recruit ratings: Scout: Rivals: (40)					
C.J. Broades; WR, S	Texarkana, TX	Pleasant Grove	6 ft 1 in (1.85 m)	195 lb (88 kg)	4.50	Dec 3, 2008
C.J. Broades; WR, S	Recruit ratings: Scout: Rivals: (40)					
Cassetti Brown; S	Leesville, LA	Leesville	6 ft 2 in (1.88 m)	180 lb (82 kg)	4.40	Jul 31, 2008
Cassetti Brown; S	Recruit ratings: Scout: Rivals: (76)					
Sharman Brown; WR	Mansfield, TX	Timberview	6 ft 1 in (1.85 m)	180 lb (82 kg)	4.48	Oct 21, 2008
Sharman Brown; WR	Recruit ratings: Scout: Rivals: (40)					
Vincent Cano; OG	Kilgore, TX	Kilgore	6 ft 2 in (1.88 m)	283 lb (128 kg)	5.08	Nov 29, 2008
Vincent Cano; OG	Recruit ratings: Scout: Rivals: (40)					
Lennon Creer; RB	Tatum, TX	Tennessee	6 ft 1 in (1.85 m)	205 lb (93 kg)	4.49	Transfer
Lennon Creer; RB	Recruit ratings: Scout: Rivals: (81)					
Javontay Crowe; S	Ruston, LA	Ruston	6 ft 1 in (1.85 m)	180 lb (82 kg)	4.48	Dec 4, 2008
Javontay Crowe; S	Recruit ratings: Scout: Rivals: (40)					
Tyrone Duplessis; RB	New Orleans, LA	O.P. Walker	5 ft 6 in (1.68 m)	181 lb (82 kg)	4.53	Nov 26, 2008
Tyrone Duplessis; RB	Recruit ratings: Scout: Rivals: (74)					
Justin Ellis; OG	Monroe, LA	Neville	6 ft 2 in (1.88 m)	313 lb (142 kg)	–	Dec 30, 2008
Justin Ellis; OG	Recruit ratings: Scout: Rivals: (40)					
I.K. Enemkpali; OLB	Pflugerville, TX	Pflugerville	6 ft 1 in (1.85 m)	226 lb (103 kg)	4.55	Dec 3, 2008
I.K. Enemkpali; OLB	Recruit ratings: Scout: Rivals: (69)					
Lyle Fitte; RB	Port Sulphur, LA	South Plaquemines	5 ft 8 in (1.73 m)	190 lb (86 kg)	4.41	Oct 18, 2008
Lyle Fitte; RB	Recruit ratings: Scout: Rivals: (66)					
Quinn Giles; CB	Shreveport, LA	Evangel	5 ft 10 in (1.78 m)	185 lb (84 kg)	4.50	Jan 22, 2009
Quinn Giles; CB	Recruit ratings: Scout: Rivals: (40)					
Jacarri Jackson; WR	Logansport, LA	Logansport	6 ft 3 in (1.91 m)	186 lb (84 kg)	–	Nov 3, 2008
Jacarri Jackson; WR	Recruit ratings: Scout: Rivals: (40)					
Kendrick James; LB	New Orleans, LA	O.P. Walker	6 ft 1 in (1.85 m)	221 lb (100 kg)	4.64	Oct 7, 2008
Kendrick James; LB	Recruit ratings: Scout: Rivals: (73)					
Shakeil Lucas; DE	Marrero, LA	Higgins	6 ft 2 in (1.88 m)	247 lb (112 kg)	5.16	Jul 31, 2008
Shakeil Lucas; DE	Recruit ratings: Scout: Rivals: (40)					
Jacob Miller; OG	Madison, KS	Hutchinson	6 ft 3 in (1.91 m)	288 lb (131 kg)	5.15	Dec 14, 2008
Jacob Miller; OG	Recruit ratings: Scout: Rivals: (–)					
Jordan Mills; OT	Napoleonville, LA	Assumption	6 ft 6 in (1.98 m)	293 lb (133 kg)	5.20	Jan 9, 2009
Jordan Mills; OT	Recruit ratings: Scout: Rivals: (40)					
Tim Molton; WR	Destrehan, LA	Louisiana State	6 ft 3 in (1.91 m)	181 lb (82 kg)	4.48	Transfer
Tim Molton; WR	Recruit ratings: Scout: Rivals: (74)					
D.J. Morrow; RB	Palestine, TX	Westwood	5 ft 11 in (1.80 m)	193 lb (88 kg)	4.50	Jul 16, 2008
D.J. Morrow; RB	Recruit ratings: Scout: Rivals: (40)					
Matt Nelson; K	Cibolo, TX	Steele	5 ft 10 in (1.78 m)	150 lb (68 kg)	4.90	Jul 19, 2008
Matt Nelson; K	Recruit ratings: Scout: Rivals: (73)					
Ahmad Paige; WR	Sterlington, LA	Tennessee	6 ft 1 in (1.85 m)	180 lb (82 kg)	4.40	Transfer
Ahmad Paige; WR	Recruit ratings: Scout: Rivals: (79)					
Olajuwan Paige; CB	Milledgeville, GA	Georgia Military	5 ft 10 in (1.78 m)	180 lb (82 kg)	4.44	Dec 31, 2008
Olajuwan Paige; CB	Recruit ratings: Scout: Rivals: (–)					
Rufus Porter; OLB	Destrehan, LA	Destrehan	6 ft 0 in (1.83 m)	200 lb (91 kg)	4.60	Jan 27, 2009
Rufus Porter; OLB	Recruit ratings: Scout: Rivals: (40)					
Doak Raulston; QB	Fort Worth, TX	All Saints'	6 ft 2 in (1.88 m)	183 lb (83 kg)	4.60	Nov 2, 2008
Doak Raulston; QB	Recruit ratings: Scout: Rivals: (75)					
Matt Shepperd; OC	Marshall, TX	Marshall	6 ft 4 in (1.93 m)	298 lb (135 kg)	–	Nov 15, 2008
Matt Shepperd; OC	Recruit ratings: Scout: Rivals: (74)					
D.J. St. Julien; WR	Scott, LA	Acadiana	6 ft 2 in (1.88 m)	180 lb (82 kg)	4.45	Dec 3, 2008
D.J. St. Julien; WR	Recruit ratings: Scout: Rivals: (40)					
Andre Taylor; TE	Round Rock, TX	Round Rock	6 ft 5 in (1.96 m)	218 lb (99 kg)	4.60	Jan 14, 2009
Andre Taylor; TE	Recruit ratings: Scout: Rivals: (40)					
Fred Thomas; CB	Lutcher, LA	Lutcher	5 ft 11 in (1.80 m)	156 lb (71 kg)	4.73	Feb 4, 2009
Fred Thomas; CB	Recruit ratings: Scout: Rivals: (40)					
John White; DT	Miami, OK	Northeastern Oklahoma A&M	6 ft 3 in (1.91 m)	283 lb (128 kg)	–	Dec 6, 2008
John White; DT	Recruit ratings: Scout: Rivals: (–)					
Overall recruit ranking: Scout: 80 Rivals: 76
‡ Refers to 40-yard dash; Note: In many cases, Scout, Rivals, 247Sports, On3, and ESPN may conflict in their listings of height, weight and 40 time.; In these cases, the average was taken. ESPN grades are on a 100-point scale.; Sources: "2009 Team Ranking". Rivals.com.

=== T-Day spring game ===
	1	2	3	4	Total
White	0	0	0	0	0
Red	0	14	0	7	21

On April 11, 2009, the Red Team beat the White Team 21–0 at Joe Aillet Stadium with 3,042 fans in attendance. ESPN Radio's Sean Fox coached the Red Team, and Nick White, also from ESPN Radio, coached the White Team. After a scoreless first quarter, quarterback Steven Ensminger completed a 40-yard pass to tight end Dennis Morris on a trick play to put the Red Team in scoring position. Running Back Daniel Porter scored on a 2-yard touchdown run to put the Red Team up 6–0. Kicker Joel Hall connected on the extra point to make it 7–0. With 1:08 left in the first half, Ensminger completed a 68-yard touchdown pass to wide receiver Cruz Williams to put the Red Team ahead 13–0. Kicker Dale Wallace converted the extra point to make the score 14–0 Red Team going into halftime. Running back Zach Booker scored on a 45-yard touchdown run with 3:28 left in the game to increase the Red Team's lead to 20–0. Hall completed the extra point to make the final score 21–0. Red Team Linebacker Adrien Cole led all tacklers with nine. Red Team Defensive lineman Ramone Randle recorded two sacks, and cornerback Olajuwon Paige recorded two interceptions for the Red Team.

== Schedule ==
Date	Time	Opponent	Site	TV	Result	Attendance	Source
September 5	6:00 pm	at Auburn*	Jordan–Hare Stadium; Auburn, AL	ESPNU	L 13–37	81,143	
September 12	2:30 pm	at Navy*	Navy–Marine Corps Memorial Stadium; Annapolis, MD	CBSCS	L 14–32	29,102	
September 19	6:00 pm	Nicholls State*	Joe Aillet Stadium; Ruston, LA		W 48–13	19,400	
September 30	7:00 pm	Hawaii	Joe Aillet Stadium; Ruston, LA	ESPN2	W 27–6	21,263	
October 9	8:00 pm	at Nevada	Mackay Stadium; Reno, NV	ESPN	L 14–37	11,975	
October 17	3:00 pm	New Mexico State^{†}	Joe Aillet Stadium; Ruston, LA		W 45–7	20,773	
October 24	2:00 pm	at Utah State	Romney Stadium; Logan, UT	ESPN Plus	L 21–23	14,229	
October 31	4:00 pm	at Idaho	Kibbie Dome; Moscow, ID	ESPN Plus/ALT2	L 34–35	15,236	
November 6	7:00 pm	No. 5 Boise State	Joe Aillet Stadium; Ruston, LA	ESPN2	L 35–45	23,240	
November 14	6:00 pm	at No. 9 LSU*	Tiger Stadium; Baton Rouge, LA	ESPNU	L 16–24	92,584	
November 21	4:00 pm	at Fresno State	Bulldog Stadium; Fresno, CA		L 28–30	31,769	
December 5	1:00 pm	San Jose State	Joe Aillet Stadium; Ruston, LA	ESPN Plus	W 55–20	15,324	
*Non-conference game; ^{†}Homecoming; Rankings from AP Poll released prior to the game; All times are in Central time

== Roster ==
Quarterbacks: 3 Randy Hardin – Sophomore; 7 Steven Ensminger – Junior; 10 Colby Cameron – Freshman; 11 Ross Jenkins – Junior; 17 Doak Raulston – Freshman; Running backs: 5 Lennon Creer – Junior; 20 Daniel Porter – Senior; 22 Tyrone Duplessis – Freshman; 23 D.J. Morrow – Freshman; 26 Myke Compton – Junior; 29 CerDerrick Tyson – Freshman; 30 Drexel Perkins – Sophomore; 32 Allen Gilbert – Sophomore; 39 Roosevelt Falls – Junior; 41 Bobby Gorman – Freshman; Fullbacks: 38 Tristan Broussard – Junior; Wide receivers: 1 Richie Casey – Freshman; 2 Lyle Fitte – Freshman; 6 Phillip Livas – Junior; 9 Cruz Williams – Freshman; 13 Ahmad Paige – Sophomore; 15 Lamar Haddox – Sophomore; 18 Adrian Linwood – Sophomore; 19 R.P. Stuart – Sophomore; 24 Andrew Guillot – Freshman; 80 Houston Tuminello – Sophomore; 81 D.J. St. Julien – Freshman; 82 Jacarri Jackson – Freshman; 83 Cornelious Nickelson – Freshman; 88 Sharman Brown – Freshman	Tight ends: 43 Dustin Mitchell – Senior; 49 Dennis Morris – Senior; 84 Andre Taylor – Freshman; 87 Clayton Chambers – Junior; 89 Chandler Spence – Freshman; 98 Eric Harper – Sophomore; Centers: 60 Lon Roberts – Junior; Offensive line: 50 Jacob Miller – Junior; 53 Adam Hymel – Sophomore; 57 Kevin Saia – Freshman; 61 Matthew Conger – Freshman; 62 Ben Harris – Senior; 63 Stephen Warner – Freshman; 64 Corbin Best – Sophomore; 66 Matthew Shepperd – Freshman; 67 Jared Miles – Junior; 68 Chris Tusch – Junior; 69 Vince Cano – Freshman; 70 Justin Ellis – Freshman; 72 Will Taylor – Sophomore; 73 Josh Parrish – Freshman; 74 Rob McGill – Junior; 76 Cudahy Harmon – Junior; 77 Michael Lacy – Freshman; 78 Jordan Mills – Freshman; 79 Kris Cavitt – Sophomore	Defensive ends: 54 Shakeil Lucas – Freshman; 55 Jonathan Zeno – Junior; 85 Randy Grigsby – Junior; 91 Matt Broha – Sophomore; 93 Christian Lacey – Sophomore; 97 Kwame Jordan – Senior; Defensive tackles: 5 D'Anthony Smith – Senior; 83 Adrian Logan – Senior; 90 Mason Hitt – Junior; 92 Philip Longino – Sophomore; 94 Ramone Randle – Junior; 96 John White – Junior; Linebackers: 21 Dominique Faust – Junior; 36 Brian White – Senior; 40 Kiamni Washington – Junior; 41 IK Enemkpali – Freshman; 42 Kendrick James – Freshman; 44 Adrien Cole – Sophomore; 45 Jay Dudley – Sophomore; 46 Rufus Porter – Freshman; 48 Dusty Rust – Sophomore; 56 Solomon Randle – Freshman; 57 Tracy Oakley – Freshman; 58 Zachary Voss – Freshman; 59 Scott Dickson – Freshman	Defensive backs: 29 Jared Edwards – Junior; 31 Chad Boyd – Freshman; Cornerbacks: 11 DeMarcion Evans – Junior; 15 Josh Victorian – Junior; 16 Cassetti Brown – Freshman; 20 Alex Anglin – Freshman; 24 Olajuwan Paige – Junior; 27 Quinn Giles – Freshman; 28 Terry Carter – Sophomore; Safeties: 4 Tank Calais – Junior; 8 Shawn Simmons – Senior; 9 Tym Toussaint – Junior; 19 Sumner Ellis – Junior; 25 Deon Young – Senior; 34 Antonio Baker – Senior; 37 C.J. Broades – Freshman; 47 Javontay Crowe – Freshman; Kickers: 10 John Hinton – Freshman; 33 Matt Nelson – Freshman; Punters: 14 Cade Glasgow – Freshman; Long snappers: 51 Josh Cuthbert – Freshman; 52 Thomas Graham – Senior

== Coaching staff ==
Position	Name	Year at Tech	Alma mater
Head Football Coach/ Athletics Director	Derek Dooley	3rd	Virginia '90
Offensive coordinator/ Quarterbacks	Frank Scelfo	3rd	Louisiana-Monroe '81
Defensive coordinator	Tommy Spangler	3rd	Georgia '84
Defensive line	Jimmy Brumbaugh	2nd	Auburn '03
Linebackers	Stan Eggen	2nd	Moorhead State '77
Running backs	Chino Fontenette	3rd	Tulane '03
Head Strength and Conditioning Coach	Damon Harrington	6th	Louisiana Tech '00
Wide Receivers	Conroy Hines	16th	Louisiana Tech '89
Character Education Coordinator/ Assistant Strength and Conditioning Coach	Ed Jackson	17th	Louisiana Tech '83
Defensive Backs/ Recruiting Coordinator	Terry Joseph	3rd	Northwestern State '96
Offensive line	Petey Perot	21st	Northwestern State '79
Special Teams/ Tight ends	Mark Tommerdahl	1st	Concordia '83
Strength and Conditioning Intern	Schirra Fields	1st	LSU '06
Graduate Assistant (Football Operations)	Ben Larson	3rd	Susquehanna '05
Graduate Assistant (Offense)	Kyle Manley	2nd	Georgia Tech '08
Strength and Conditioning Intern	Jacob Peeler	1st	Louisiana Tech '06
Graduate Assistant (Defense)	Scott Vestal	1st	Texas A&M '03
Video Operations	David Snyder	2nd	Clemson '05

== Game summaries ==
=== Auburn ===
	1	2	3	4	Total
LA Tech	7	3	3	0	13
Auburn	10	3	10	14	37

1st quarter

- 09:24 AUB- Wes Byrum 25 Yd FG 0–3
- 05:00 LT- Dennis Morris 19 Yd Pass From Ross Jenkins (Matt Nelson Kick) 7–3
- 01:33 AUB- Kodi Burns 1 Yd Run (Wes Byrum Kick) 7–10

2nd quarter

- 00:23 LT- Matt Nelson 20 Yd FG 10–10
- 00:00 AUB- Wes Byrum 49 Yd FG 10–13

3rd quarter

- 10:59 AUB- Terrell Zachery 93 Yd Pass From Chris Todd (Wes Byrum Kick) 10–20
- 04:28 AUB- Wes Byrum 47 Yd FG 10–23
- 00:52 LT- Matt Nelson 46 Yd FG 13–23

4th quarter

- 12:45 AUB- Darvin Adams 17 Yd Pass From Chris Todd (Wes Byrum Kick) 13–30
- 05:27 AUB- Onterio McCalebb 3 Yd Run (Wes Byrum Kick) 13–37

=== Navy ===
	1	2	3	4	Total
LA Tech	14	0	0	0	14
Navy	10	8	0	14	32

1st quarter

- 11:15 LT- Daniel Porter 3 Yd Run (Matt Nelson Kick) 7–0
- 09:02 LT- Phillip Livas 85 Yd Punt Return (Matt Nelson Kick) 14–0
- 04:31 NAVY- Joe Buckley 43 Yd FG 14–3
- 01:33 NAVY- Cory Finnerty 16 Yd Run (Joe Buckley Kick)14–10

2nd quarter

- 11:10 NAVY- Ricky Dobbs 3 Yd Run (Greg Zingler Run For Two-Point Conversion) 14–18

4th quarter

- 10:31 NAVY- Marcus Curry 3 Yd Run (Joe Buckley Kick) 14–25
- 05:50 NAVY- Ricky Dobbs 2 Yd Run (Joe Buckley Kick) 14–32

=== Nicholls State ===
	1	2	3	4	Total
Nicholls	3	0	0	10	13
LA Tech	3	10	21	14	48

1st quarter

- 12:03 LT- Matt Nelson 24 Yd FG 0–3
- 09:20 NICH- Ross Schexnayder 48 Yd FG 3–3

2nd quarter

- 14:55 LT- Daniel Porter 2 Yd Run (Matt Nelson Kick) 3–10
- 01:19 LT- Matt Nelson 44 Yd FG 3–13

3rd quarter

- 13:57 LT- D.J. Morrow 9 Yd Run (Matt Nelson Kick) 3–20
- 12:17 LT- Deon Young 32 Yd Interception Return (Matt Nelson Kick) 3–27
- 04:47 LT- Dennis Morris 37 Yd Pass From Ross Jenkins (Matt Nelson Kick) 3–34

4th quarter

- 14:24 LT- Houston Tuminello 6 Yd Pass From Ross Jenkins (Matt Nelson Kick) 3–41
- 10:47 NICH- Jacob Witt 24 Yd Run (Ross Schexnayder Kick) 10–41
- 08:27 LT- Colby Cameron 1 Yd Run (Matt Nelson Kick) 10–48
- 03:50 NICH- Ross Schexnayder 42 Yd FG 13–48

=== Hawaii ===
	1	2	3	4	Total
Hawaii	3	3	0	0	6
LA Tech	7	3	14	3	27

1st quarter

- 06:32 HAW- Scott Enos 36 Yd FG 3–0
- 02:39 LT- Daniel Porter 3 Yd Run (Matt Nelson Kick) 3–7

2nd quarter

- 05:39 LT- Matt Nelson 28 Yd FG 3–10
- 00:08 HAW- Scott Enos 18 Yd FG 6–10

3rd quarter

- 12:08 LT- Daniel Porter 1 Yd Run (Matt Nelson Kick) 6–17
- 02:22 LT- Myke Compton 6 Yd Run (Matt Nelson Kick) 6–24

4th quarter

- 12:05 LT- Matt Nelson 26 Yd FG 6–27

=== Nevada ===
	1	2	3	4	Total
LA Tech	7	0	7	0	14
Nevada	14	3	13	7	37

1st quarter

- 14:16 LT- Daniel Porter 15 Yd Run (Matt Nelson Kick) 7–0
- 04:34 NEV- Talaiasi Puloka Jr. 3 Yd Pass From Colin Kaepernick (Richard Drake Kick) 7–7
- 00:29 NEV- Colin Kaepernick 5 Yd Run (Richard Drake Kick) 7–14

2nd quarter

- 10:22 NEV- Richard Drake 40 Yd FG 7–17

3rd quarter

- 10:15 NEV- Brandon Wimberly 24 Yd Pass From Colin Kaepernick (Pat Failed) 7–23
- 09:56 LT- Daniel Porter 64 Yd Run (Matt Nelson Kick) 14–23
- 01:57 NEV- Colin Kaepernick 67 Yd Run (Richard Drake Kick) 14–30

4th quarter

- 14:49 NEV- Virgil Green 3 Yd Pass From Colin Kaepernick (Richard Drake Kick) 14–37

=== New Mexico State ===
	1	2	3	4	Total
NM State	0	0	0	7	7
LA Tech	10	14	14	7	45

1st quarter

- 08:56 LT- Matt Nelson 26 Yd FG 0–3
- 04:07 LT- Myke Compton 10 Yd Run (Matt Nelson Kick) 0–10

2nd quarter

- 09:00 LT- Ross Jenkins 1 Yd Run (Matt Nelson Kick) 0–17
- 00:57 LT- Dennis Morris 29 Yd Pass From Ross Jenkins (Matt Nelson Kick) 0–24

3rd quarter

- 11:07 LT- Adrian Linwood 32 Yd Pass From Ross Jenkins (Matt Nelson Kick) 0–31
- 06:42 LT- Dennis Morris 16 Yd Pass From Ross Jenkins (Matt Nelson Kick) 0–38

4th quarter

- 09:15 LT- Lyle Fitte 26 Yd Run (Matt Nelson Kick) 0–45
- 04:56 NMSU- Davon House 38 Yd Fumble Return (Kyle Hughes Kick) 7–45

=== Utah State ===
	1	2	3	4	Total
LA Tech	0	7	0	14	21
Utah St.	0	20	3	0	23

2nd quarter

- 13:31 USU- Stanley Morrison 41 Yd Pass From Diondre Borel (Chris Ulinski Kick) 0–7
- 11:00 USU- Chris Ulinski 28 Yd FG 0–10
- 10:45 LT- Phillip Livas 100 Yd Kickoff Return (Matt Nelson Kick) 7–10
- 08:16 USU- Derrvin Speight 44 Yd Run (Chris Ulinski Kick) 7–17
- 00:17 USU- Chris Ulinski 27 Yd FG 7–20

3rd quarter

- 05:21 USU- Chris Ulinski 40 Yd FG 7–23

4th quarter

- 10:38 LT- R.P. Stuart 26 Yd Pass From Ross Jenkins (Ross Jenkins Pass To Phillip Livas For Two-Point Conversion) 15–23
- 06:15 LT- Dennis Morris 20 Yd Pass From Ross Jenkins (Two-Point Pass Conversion Failed) 21–23

=== Idaho ===
	1	2	3	4	Total
LA Tech	21	7	0	6	34
Idaho	7	7	7	14	35

1st quarter

- 14:45 IDHO- Justin Veltung 94 Yd Kickoff Return (Trey Farquhar Kick) 0–7
- 13:01 LT- Cruz Williams 17 Yd Pass From Ross Jenkins (Matt Nelson Kick) 7–7
- 09:27 LT- Daniel Porter 3 Yd Run (Matt Nelson Kick) 14–7
- 02:48 LT- Dennis Morris 10 Yd Pass From Ross Jenkins (Matt Nelson Kick) 21–7

2nd quarter

- 14:49 IDHO- Max Komar 36 Yd Pass From Nathan Enderle (Trey Farquhar Kick) 21–14
- 06:19 LT- Cruz Williams 20 Yd Pass From Ross Jenkins (Matt Nelson Kick) 28–14

3rd quarter

- 10:38 IDHO- Max Komar 32 Yd Pass From Nathan Enderle (Trey Farquhar Kick) 28–21

4th quarter

- 14:57 LT- Myke Compton 1 Yd Run (Pat Failed) 34–21
- 05:51 IDHO- DeMaundray Woolridge 1 Yd Run (Trey Farquhar Kick) 34–28
- 00:52 IDHO- DeMaundray Woolridge 2 Yd Run (Trey Farquhar Kick) 34–35

=== Boise State ===
	1	2	3	4	Total
#5 Boise St.	13	14	3	15	45
LA Tech	7	0	14	14	35

1st quarter

- 10:57 BSU- Kyle Brotzman 29 Yd FG 3–0
- 08:14 LT- Daniel Porter 1 Yd Run (Matt Nelson Kick) 3–7
- 05:03 BSU- Kyle Brotzman 34 Yd FG 6–7
- 00:44 BSU- Richie Brockel 2 Yd Pass From Kellen Moore (Kyle Brotzman Kick) 13–7

2nd quarter

- 13:52 BSU- Doug Martin 2 Yd Run (Kyle Brotzman Kick) 20–7
- 07:35 BSU- Titus Young 40 Yd Pass From Kellen Moore (Kyle Brotzman Kick) 27–7

3rd quarter

- 13:12 LT- Josh Victorian 75 Yd Interception Return (Matt Nelson Kick) 27–14
- 00:31 BSU- Kyle Brotzman 25 Yd FG 30–14
- 01:30 LT- Ross Jenkins 9 Yd Run (Matt Nelson Kick) 30–21

4th quarter

- 14:07 LT- Dennis Morris 5 Yd Pass From Ross Jenkins (Matt Nelson Kick) 30–28
- 07:41 BSU- Austin Pettis 12 Yd Pass From Kellen Moore (Kellen Moore Pass To Tyler Shoemaker For Two-Point Conversion) 38–28
- 04:52 BSU- Jeremy Avery 44 Yd Run (Kyle Brotzman Kick) 45–28
- 02:49 LT- Myke Compton 1 Yd Run (Matt Nelson Kick) 45–35

=== LSU ===
	1	2	3	4	Total
LA Tech	3	10	0	3	16
#11 LSU	10	0	7	7	24

1st quarter

- 09:08 LSU- Josh Jasper 35 Yd FG 0–3
- 04:23 LT- Matt Nelson 30 Yd FG 3–3
- 01:55 LSU- Brandon LaFell 38 Yd Pass From Jarrett Lee (Josh Jasper Kick) 3–10

2nd quarter

- 05:39 LT- Matt Nelson 33 Yd FG 6–10
- 00:00 LT- Dennis Morris 1 Yd Pass From Daniel Porter (Matt Nelson Kick) 13–10

3rd quarter

- 06:59 LSU- Keiland Williams 3 Yd Run (Josh Jasper Kick) 13–17

4th quarter

- 07:01 LSU- Keiland Williams 9 Yd Run (Josh Jasper Kick) 13–24
- 00:25 LT- Matt Nelson 36 Yd FG 16–24

=== Fresno State ===
	1	2	3	4	Total
LA Tech	14	7	7	0	28
Fresno St.	14	7	3	6	30

1st quarter

- 14:37 LT- Dennis Morris 50 Yd Pass From Ross Jenkins (Matt Nelson Kick) 7–0
- 07:04 FRES- Seyi Ajirotutu 23 Yd Pass From Ryan Colburn (Kevin Goessling Kick) 7–7
- 06:47 FRES- Ben Jacobs 21 Yd Fumble Return (Kevin Goessling Kick) 7–14
- 03:07 LT- Dennis Morris 12 Yd Pass From Ross Jenkins (Matt Nelson Kick) 14–14

2nd quarter

- 13:56 FRES- Lonyae Miller 5 Yd Run (Kevin Goessling Kick) 14–21
- 10:44 LT- Dennis Morris 39 Yd Pass From Ross Jenkins (Matt Nelson Kick) 21–21

3rd quarter

- 08:27 FRES- Kevin Goessling 24 Yd FG 21–24
- 04:51 LT- Cruz Williams 36 Yd Pass From Ross Jenkins (Matt Nelson Kick) 28–24

4th quarter

- 12:50 FRES- Kevin Goessling 23 Yd FG 28–27
- 00:00 FRES- Kevin Goessling 35 Yd FG 28–30

=== San Jose State ===
	1	2	3	4	Total
SJSU	14	0	6	0	20
LA Tech	14	31	3	7	55

1st quarter

- 10:20 SJSU- Marquis Avery 16 Yd Pass From Kyle Reed (Philip Zavala Kick) 7–0
- 07:54 LT- Daniel Porter 8 Yd Run (Matt Nelson Kick) 7–7
- 03:17 SJSU- Jalal Beauchman 2 Yd Pass From Kyle Reed (Philip Zavala Kick) 14–7
- 01:48 LT- Daniel Porter 39 Yd Run (Matt Nelson Kick) 14–14

2nd quarter

- 13:02 LT- Dennis Morris 19 Yd Pass From D.J. Morrow (Matt Nelson Kick) 14–21
- 12:06 LT- Deon Young 55 Yd Interception Return (Matt Nelson Kick) 14–28
- 09:14 LT- Lyle Fitte 38 Yd Pass From Ross Jenkins (Matt Nelson Kick) 14–35
- 02:51 LT- Daniel Porter 3 Yd Run (Matt Nelson Kick) 14–42
- 00:00 LT- Matt Nelson 39 Yd FG 14–45

3rd quarter

- 08:51 SJSU- Marquis Avery 80 Yd Pass From Jordan La Secla (Two-Point Conversion Failed) 20–45
- 01:53 LT- Matt Nelson 32 Yd FG 20–48

4th quarter

- 06:31 LT- Tank Calais 96 Yd Interception Return (Matt Nelson Kick) 20–55
