= 2009 Fresno State Bulldogs football team =

American college football season

2009 Fresno State Bulldogs football

New Mexico Bowl, L 28–35 ^{2OT} vs. Wyoming
- Conference: Western Athletic Conference
- Record: 8–5 (6–2 WAC)
- Head coach: Pat Hill (13th season)
- Offensive scheme: Pro-style
- Defensive coordinator: Randy Stewart (1st season)
- Base defense: 4–3
- Home stadium: Bulldog Stadium

2009 Western Athletic Conference football standings
	Conf.			Overall
Team	W		L	W		L
No. 4 Boise State $%	8	–	0	14	–	0
Nevada	7	–	1	8	–	5
Fresno State	6	–	2	8	–	5
Idaho	4	–	4	8	–	5
Hawaii	3	–	5	6	–	7
Louisiana Tech	3	–	5	4	–	8
Utah State	3	–	5	4	–	8
New Mexico State	1	–	7	3	–	10
San Jose State	1	–	7	2	–	10
% – BCS at-large representative; $ – Conference champion; Rankings from AP Poll

The 2009 Fresno State football team represented California State University, Fresno and in the 2009 NCAA Division I FBS football season. The team was coached by 13th-year head coach Pat Hill. 2009 was the Bulldogs' 29th in their current home of Bulldog Stadium in Fresno, California. The Bulldogs finished the season 8–5, 6–2 in WAC play and lost to Wyoming 35–28 in two overtimes in the New Mexico Bowl.

== Personnel ==
=== Coaching staff ===
Name	Position	Seasons at Fresno State	Alma mater
Pat Hill	Head coach	13th as HC; 19th overall	UC Riverside (1973)
Randy Stewart	Defensive coordinator	3rd	
John Baxter	Tight Ends/Special Teams/Assistant Head Coach	13th	Loras College
Tim Skipper	Linebackers/Run game coordinator	4th	Fresno State (2001)
Keith Williams	Wide receivers	1st	San Diego State (1996)

== Schedule ==
Date	Time	Opponent	Site	TV	Result	Attendance
September 5	7:00 pm	UC Davis*	Bulldog Stadium; Fresno, CA		W 51–0	37,267
September 12	9:00 am	at Wisconsin*	Camp Randall Stadium; Madison, WI	ESPN	L 31–34 ^{2OT}	80,353
September 18	6:00 pm	No. 10 Boise State	Bulldog Stadium; Fresno, CA (Battle for the Milk Can)	ESPN	L 34–51	35,637
September 26	9:00 am	at No. 14 Cincinnati*	Nippert Stadium; Cincinnati, OH		L 20–28	32,910
October 10	8:05 pm	at Hawaii	Aloha Stadium; Honolulu, HI (rivalry)		W 42–17	38,556
October 17	7:00 pm	San Jose State	Bulldog Stadium; Fresno, CA (rivalry)		W 41–21	35,495
October 24	7:15 pm	at New Mexico State	Aggie Memorial Stadium; Las Cruces, NM	ESPNU	W 34–3	18,893
October 31	2:00 pm	Utah State	Bulldog Stadium; Fresno, CA		W 31–27	27,721
November 7	7:30 pm	at Idaho	Kibbie Dome; Moscow, ID	ESPNU	W 31–21	12,418
November 14	1:00 pm	at Nevada	Mackay Stadium; Reno, NV	KAIL/CSNCA	L 14–52	19,331
November 21	2:00 pm	Louisiana Tech	Bulldog Stadium; Fresno, CA		W 30–28	31,769
December 5	9:30 am	at Illinois*	Memorial Stadium; Champaign, IL	BTN	W 53–52	48,538
December 19	1:30 pm	vs. Wyoming	University Stadium; Albuquerque, NM (New Mexico Bowl)	ESPN	L 28–35 ^{2OT}	24,898
*Non-conference game; Rankings from AP Poll released prior to the game; All times are in Pacific time

== Game summaries ==
=== UC Davis ===
	1	2	3	4	Total
Aggies	0	0	0	0	0
Bulldogs	14	21	14	2	51

Ryan Colburn wins the starter role at Quarterback after a long offseason battle with Ebahn Feathers and Derek Carr.

1st Quarter

- 09:18 FRES- Ryan Colburn 1 Yd Run (Kevin Goessling Kick) 0–7
- 06:09 FRES- Ryan Mathews 60 Yd Run (Kevin Goessling Kick) 0–14

2nd Quarter

- 07:38 FRES- Nico Herron 94 Yd Interception Return (Kevin Goessling Kick) 0–21
- 04:05 FRES- Marlon Moore 92 Yd Pass From Ryan Colburn (Kevin Goessling Kick) 0–28
- 00:36 FRES- Ebahn Feathers 20 Yd Run (Kevin Goessling Kick) 0–35

3rd Quarter

- 10:18 FRES- Lonyae Miller 3 Yd Run (Kevin Goessling Kick) 0–42
- 04:41 FRES- Robbie Rouse 5 Yd Run (Kevin Goessling Kick)0–49

4th Quarter

- 11:27 FRES- Joe Trombetta Tackled By David Gory In End Zone Safety 0–51

=== At Wisconsin ===
	1	2	3	4	OT	2OT	Total
Bulldogs	7	14	0	3	7	0	31
Badgers	0	17	0	7	7	3	34

1st Quarter

- 06:14 FRES — Chastin West 13 Yd Pass From Ryan Colburn (Kevin Goessling Kick) 7–0

2nd Quarter

- 14:46 FRES — Devon Wylie 70 Yd Pass From Ryan Colburn (Kevin Goessling Kick) 14–0
- 11:35 WISC — Zach Brown 11 Yd Run (Philip Welch Kick) 14–7
- 07:01 FRES — Seyi Ajirotutu 14 Yd Pass From Ryan Colburn (Kevin Goessling Kick) 21–7
- 04:27 WISC — David Gilreath 8 Yd Run (Philip Welch Kick) 21–14
- 00:00 WISC — Philip Welch 57 Yd FG 21–17

4th Quarter

- 05:45 WISC — John Clay 72 Yd Run (Philip Welch Kick) 21–24
- 00:16 FRES — Kevin Goessling 41 Yd FG 24–24

1st Overtime

- WISC — Nick Toon 6 Yd Pass From Scott Tolzien (Philip Welch Kick) 24–31
- FRES — Seyi Ajirotutu 7 Yd Pass From Ryan Colburn (Kevin Goessling Kick) 31–31

2nd Overtime

- WISC — Philip Welch 22 Yd FG 31-34

=== No. 10 Boise State ===
	1	2	3	4	Total
No. 10 Broncos	10	14	10	17	51
Bulldogs	0	17	10	7	34

1st Quarter

- 13:05 BSU — Winston Venable 30 Yd Interception Return (Kyle Brotzman Kick) 7–0
- 08:49 BSU — Kyle Brotzman 32 Yd FG 10–0

2nd Quarter

- 12:28 BSU — D.J. Harper 60 Yd Run (Kyle Brotzman Kick) 17–0
- 09:44 FRES — Kevin Goessling 37 Yd FG 17–3
- 07:49 BSU — Titus Young 7 Yd Pass From Kellen Moore (Kyle Brotzman Kick) 24–3
- 07:33 FRES — Ryan Mathews 69 Yd Run (Kevin Goessling Kick) 24–10
- 04:58 FRES — Ryan Mathews 60 Yd Run (Kevin Goessling Kick) 24–17

3rd Quarter

- 12:28 BSU — Kyle Brotzman 30 Yd FG 27–17
- 11:39 FRES — Devon Wylie 21 Yd Pass From Ryan Colburn (Kevin Goessling Kick) 27–24
- 10:44 BSU — Titus Young Recovered Fumble In End Zone (Kyle Brotzman Kick) 34–24
- 03:12 FRES — Kevin Goessling 27 Yd FG 34–27

4th Quarter

- 14:14 BSU — Austin Pettis 8 Yd Pass From Kellen Moore (Jimmy Pavel Kick) 41–27
- 13:26 FRES — Ryan Mathews 68 Yd Run (Kevin Goessling Kick) 41–34
- 13:00 BSU — Jeremy Avery 67 Yd Pass From Kellen Moore (Jimmy Pavel Kick) 48–34
- 04:00 BSU — Jimmy Pavel 24 Yd FG 51–34

=== At No. 15 Cincinnati ===
	1	2	3	4	Total
Bulldogs	3	14	0	3	20
No. 15 Bearcats	14	7	0	7	28

1st Quarter

- 12:48 CIN — Ben Guidugli 33 Yd Pass From Tony Pike (Jake Rogers Kick) 0–7
- 07:47 FRES — Kevin Goessling 36 Yd FG 3–7
- 05:58 CIN — Marshwan Gilyard 11 Yd Pass From Tony Pike (Jake Rogers Kick) 3–14

2nd Quarter

- 11:48 FRES — Ryan Mathews 1 Yd Run (Kevin Goessling Kick) 10–14
- 08:55 CIN — Isaiah Pead 1 Yd Run (Jake Rogers Kick) 10–21
- 00:07 FRES — Jamel Hamler 21 Yd Pass From Ryan Colburn (Kevin Goessling Kick) 17–21

4th Quarter

- 13:09 CIN — Marshwan Gilyard 23 Yd Pass From Tony Pike (Jake Rogers Kick) 17–28
- 08:09 FRES — Kevin Goessling 49 Yd FG 20–28

=== At Hawaii ===
	1	2	3	4	Total
Bulldogs	14	14	14	0	42
Warriors	0	3	0	14	17

1st Quarter

- 11:59 FRES — Lonyae Miller 3 Yd Run (Kevin Goessling Kick) 7–0
- 06:58 FRES — Ryan Mathews 19 Yd Run (Kevin Goessling Kick)14–0

2nd Quarter

- 07:55 FRES — Devon Wylie 17 Yd Pass From Ryan Colburn (Kevin Goessling Kick) 21–0
- 03:20 HAW — Scott Enos 33 Yd FG 21–3
- 00:11 FRES — Chastin West 17 Yd Pass From Ryan Colburn (Kevin Goessling Kick) 28–3

3rd Quarter

- 11:05 FRES — Robbie Rouse 34 Yd Run (Kevin Goessling Kick)35–3
- 03:58 FRES — Robbie Rouse 16 Yd Run (Kevin Goessling Kick) 42–3

4th Quarter

- 07:25 HAW — Jon Medeiros 1 Yd Pass From Bryant Moniz (Scott Enos Kick) 42–10
- 04:42 HAW — Rodney Bradley 4 Yd Pass From Bryant Moniz (Scott Enos Kick) 42–17

=== San José State ===
	1	2	3	4	Total
Spartans	14	0	0	7	21
Bulldogs	7	24	0	10	41

1st Quarter

- 13:44 SJSU — Jalal Beauchman 20 Yd Pass From Jordan La Secla (Tyler Cope Kick) 7–0
- 07:11 FRES — Devon Wylie 27 Yd Pass From Ryan Colburn (Kevin Goessling Kick) 7–7
- 02:06 SJSU — Brandon Rutley 7 Yd Run (Tyler Cope Kick) 14–7

2nd Quarter

- 13:11 FRES — Robbie Rouse 3 Yd Run (Kevin Goessling Kick) 14–14
- 05:21 FRES — Marlon Moore 23 Yd Pass From Ryan Colburn (Kevin Goessling Kick) 14–21
- 01:48 FRES — Ryan Mathews 59 Yd Run (Kevin Goessling Kick) 14–28
- 00:00 FRES — Kevin Goessling 40 Yd FG 14–31

4th Quarter

- 14:53 FRES — Marlon Moore 4 Yd Pass From Ebahn Feathers (Kevin Goessling Kick) 14–38
- 06:56 FRES — Kevin Goessling 46 Yd FG 14–41
- 00:09 SJSU — Josh Harrison 59 Yd Pass From Kyle Reed (Tyler Cope Kick) 21–41

=== At New Mexico State ===
	1	2	3	4	Total
Bulldogs	0	13	14	7	34
Aggies	3	0	0	0	3

1st Quarter

- 08:36 NMSU- Kyle Hughes 32 Yd FG 0–3

2nd Quarter

- 09:54 FRES — Lorne Bell 17 Yd Interception Return (Kevin Goessling Kick)7–3
- 06:11 FRES — Kevin Goessling 23 Yd FG 10–3
- 00:00 FRES — Kevin Goessling 43 Yd FG 13–3

3rd Quarter

- 06:44 FRES — Ryan Mathews 1 Yd Run (Kevin Goessling Kick) 20–3
- 03:09 FRES — Chastin West 88 Yd Punt Return (Kevin Goessling Kick) 27–3

4th Quarter

- 14:16 FRES — Ryan Mathews 68 Yd Run (Kevin Goessling Kick) 34–3

=== Utah State ===
	1	2	3	4	Total
Aggies	10	17	0	0	27
Bulldogs	14	3	7	7	31

1st Quarter

- 11:14 USU — Chris Ulinski 26 Yd FG 3–0
- 09:47 FRES — Ryan Mathews 9 Yd Run (Kevin Goessling Kick) 3–7
- 08:20 USU — Xavier Bowman 5 Yd Pass From Diondre Borel (Chris Ulinski Kick) 10–7
- 04:21 FRES — Seyi Ajirotutu 18 Yd Pass From Ryan Colburn (Kevin Goessling Kick) 10–14

2nd Quarter

- 09:48 FRES — Kevin Goessling 50 Yd FG 10–17
- 05:02 USU — Robert Turbin 1 Yd Run (Chris Ulinski Kick) 17–17
- 01:57 USU — Diondre Borel 1 Yd Run (Chris Ulinski Kick) 24–17
- 00:00 USU — Chris Ulinski 23 Yd FG 27–17

3rd Quarter

- 08:10 FRES — Lonyae Miller 2 Yd Run (Kevin Goessling Kick) 27–24

4th Quarter

- 04:53 FRES — Ryan Mathews 10 Yd Run (Kevin Goessling Kick) 27–31

=== At Idaho ===
	1	2	3	4	Total
Bulldogs	17	7	7	0	31
Vandals	0	0	7	14	21

1st Quarter

- 14:41 FRES — Ryan Mathews 77 Yd Run (Kevin Goessling Kick) 7–0
- 08:32 FRES — Seyi Ajirotutu 18 Yd Pass From Ryan Colburn (Kevin Goessling Kick) 14–0
- 01:26 FRES — Kevin Goessling 52 Yd FG 17–0

2nd Quarter

- 01:07 FRES — Ryan Mathews 1 Yd Run (Kevin Goessling Kick) 24–0

3rd Quarter

- 05:51 IDHO — Max Komar 14 Yd Pass From Brian Reader (Trey Farquhar Kick) 24–7
- 00:47 FRES — Ryan Mathews 1 Yd Run (Kevin Goessling Kick) 31–7

4th Quarter

- 12:21 IDHO — Brian Reader 4 Yd Run (Brian Reader Pass To Eric Greenwood For Two-Point Conversion) 31–15
- 00:25 IDHO — Maurice Shaw 69 Yd Pass From Brian Reader (Two-Point Pass Conversion Failed) 31–21

=== At Nevada ===
	1	2	3	4	Total
Bulldogs	14	0	0	0	14
Wolf Pack	10	14	14	14	52

1st Quarter

- 11:47 FRES — Jamel Hamler 57 Yd Pass From Ryan Colburn (Kevin Goessling Kick) 7–0
- 08:52 NEV — Vai Taua 50 Yd Run (Richard Drake Kick) 7–7
- 06:24 FRES — Seyi Ajirotutu 3 Yd Pass From Ryan Colburn (Kevin Goessling Kick) 14–7
- 00:38 NEV — Richard Drake 40 Yd FG 14–10

2nd Quarter

- 06:51 NEV — Luke Lippincott 1 Yd Run (Richard Drake Kick) 14–17
- 02:31 NEV — Vai Taua 65 Yd Run (Richard Drake Kick) 14–24

3rd Quarter

- 12:07 NEV — Colin Kaepernick 6 Yd Run (Richard Drake Kick) 14–31
- 10:40 NEV — Luke Lippincott 27 Yd Run (Richard Drake Kick) 14–38

4th Quarter

- 08:54 NEV — Luke Lippincott 4 Yd Run (Richard Drake Kick) 14–45
- 07:36 NEV — Colin Kaepernick 21 Yd Run (Richard Drake Kick) 14–52

=== Louisiana Tech ===
	1	2	3	4	Total
Louisiana Tech Bulldogs	14	7	7	0	28
Fresno State Bulldogs	14	7	3	6	30

1st Quarter

- 14:37 LT — Dennis Morris 50 Yd Pass From Ross Jenkins (Matt Nelson Kick) 7–0
- 07:04 FRES — Seyi Ajirotutu 23 Yd Pass From Ryan Colburn (Kevin Goessling Kick) 7–7
- 06:47 FRES — Ben Jacobs 21 Yd Fumble Return (Kevin Goessling Kick) 7–14
- 03:07 LT — Dennis Morris 12 Yd Pass From Ross Jenkins (Matt Nelson Kick) 14–14

2nd Quarter

- 13:56 FRES — Lonyae Miller 5 Yd Run (Kevin Goessling Kick) 14–21
- 10:44 LT — Dennis Morris 39 Yd Pass From Ross Jenkins (Matt Nelson Kick) 21–21

3rd Quarter

- 08:27 FRES — Kevin Goessling 24 Yd FG 21–24
- 04:51 LT — Cruz Williams 36 Yd Pass From Ross Jenkins (Matt Nelson Kick) 28–24

4th Quarter

- 12:50 FRES — Kevin Goessling 23 Yd FG 28–27
- 00:00 FRES — Kevin Goessling 35 Yd FG 28–30

=== At Illinois ===
	1	2	3	4	Total
Bulldogs	7	14	10	22	53
Fighting Illini	7	21	10	14	52

1st Quarter

- 09:28 ILL — Daniel Dufrene 15 Yd Run (Derek Dimke Kick) 0–7
- 01:17 FRES — Ryan Mathews 1 Yd Run (Kevin Goessling Kick) 7–7

2nd Quarter

- 14:54 FRES — Phillip Thomas 21 Yd Interception Return (Kevin Goessling Kick) 14–7
- 09:00 ILL — Jeff Cumberland 18 Yd Pass From Juice Williams (Derek Dimke Kick) 14–14
- 03:30 ILL — Jason Ford 8 Yd Run (Derek Dimke Kick) 14–21
- 00:22 FRES — Seyi Ajirotutu 4 Yd Pass From Ryan Colburn (Kevin Goessling Kick) 21–21
- 00:08 ILL — Arrelious Benn 58 Yd Pass From Juice Williams (Derek Dimke Kick) 21–28

3rd Quarter

- 08:04 ILL — Derek Dimke 44 Yd FG 21–31
- 03:51 FRES — Ryan Mathews 1 Yd Run (Kevin Goessling Kick) 28–31
- 01:44 FRES — Kevin Goessling 34 Yd FG 31–31
- 00:00 ILL — Mikel LeShoure 61 Yd Run (Derek Dimke Kick) 31–38

4th Quarter

- 12:56 FRES — Ryan Mathews 27 Yd Run (Kevin Goessling Kick) 38–38
- 09:29 ILL — Mikel LeShoure 19 Yd Run (Derek Dimke Kick) 38–45
- 08:53 FRES — Ryan Colburn 25 Yd Run (Kevin Goessling Kick) 45–45
- 06:14 ILL — Mikel LeShoure 22 Yd Pass From Juice Williams (Derek Dimke Kick) 52–45
- 00:02 FRES — Jamel Hamler 19 Yd Pass From Ryan Colburn (Ryan Colburn Pass To Devan Cunningham For Two-Point Conversion) 53–52

=== Vs. Wyoming (New Mexico Bowl) ===
	1	2	3	4	OT	2OT	Total
Bulldogs	0	14	7	7	0	0	28
Cowboys	7	7	3	11	0	7	35

1st Quarter

- 07:37 WYO — Alvester Alexander 68 Yd Run. (Ian Watts Kick) 0–7

2nd Quarter

- 12:22 FRES — Ryan Mathews 4 Yd Run. (Kevin Goessling Kick) 7–7
- 05:01 WYO — Greg Bolling 21 Yd Pass From Austyn Carta-Samuels. (Ian Watts Kick) 7–14
- 00:33 FRES — Jamel Hamler 10 Yd Pass From Ryan Colburn. (Kevin Goessling Kick) 14–14

3rd Quarter

- 13:06 FRES — Jamel Hamler 43 Yd Pass From Chastin West. (Kevin Goessling Kick) 21–14
- 08:19 WYO — Ian Watts 40 Yd FG 21–17

4th Quarter

- 13:59 FRES — Ryan Mathews 5 Yd Run. (Kevin Goessling Kick) 28–17
- 10:15 WYO — David Leonard 11 Yd Pass From Austyn Carta-Samuels. (Austyn Carta-Samuels Pass To Greg Bolling For Two-Point Conversion) 28–25
- 00:20 WYO — Ian Watts 37 Yd FG 28–28

2nd Overtime

- WYO — David Leonard 13 Yd Pass From Austyn Carta-Samuels. (Ian Watts Kick) 35–28

== Awards ==
=== All-WAC ===
First Team Offense

- RB Ryan Mathews
- OL Andrew Jackson

First Team Defense

- DL Chris Carter
- LB Ben Jacobs

First Team Specialists

- PK Kevin Goessling
- P Robert Malone

Second Team Offense

- WR Seyi Ajirotutu
- OL Kenny Wiggins

Second Team Defense

- DB Lorne Bell
- DB Moses Harris

=== Academic All-America Team ===
First Team

- OL Andrew Jackson

Second Team

- P Robert Malone

== NFL draft ==
- Running Back Ryan Mathews was drafted by the San Diego Chargers in the 1st round of the 2010 NFL draft
- Corner Back A. J. Jefferson was signed as an undrafted free agent by the Arizona Cardinals
