= 2009 Hawaii Warriors football team =

American college football season

2009 Hawaii Warriors football
- Conference: Western Athletic Conference
- Record: 6–7 (3–5 WAC)
- Head coach: Greg McMackin (2nd season)
- Offensive coordinator: Ron Lee (2nd season)
- Offensive scheme: Run and shoot
- Defensive coordinator: Cal Lee (2nd season)
- Base defense: 4–3
- Home stadium: Aloha Stadium

2009 Western Athletic Conference football standings
	Conf.			Overall
Team	W		L	W		L
No. 4 Boise State $%	8	–	0	14	–	0
Nevada	7	–	1	8	–	5
Fresno State	6	–	2	8	–	5
Idaho	4	–	4	8	–	5
Hawaii	3	–	5	6	–	7
Louisiana Tech	3	–	5	4	–	8
Utah State	3	–	5	4	–	8
New Mexico State	1	–	7	3	–	10
San Jose State	1	–	7	2	–	10
% – BCS at-large representative; $ – Conference champion; Rankings from AP Poll

The 2009 Hawaii Warriors football team represented the University of Hawaiʻi at Mānoa as a member of the Western Athletic Conference (WAC) during the 2009 NCAA Division I FBS football season. Led by second-year head coach Greg McMackin, the Warriors compiled an overall record of 6–7 with a mark of 3–5 in conference play, placing in a three-way tie for fifth in the WAC. Hawaii played home games at Aloha Stadium in Halawa, Hawaii.

== Schedule ==
Date	Time	Opponent	Site	TV	Result	Attendance	Source
September 4	7:05 pm	No. 13 (FCS) Central Arkansas*	Aloha Stadium; Halawa, HI	Oceanic PPV, KFVE (delayed)	W 25–20	33,298	
September 12	2:00 pm	vs. Washington State*	Qwest Field; Seattle, WA	FSN NW, Oceanic PPV	W 38–20	42,912	
September 19	5:00 pm	at UNLV*	Sam Boyd Stadium; Whitney, NV	The Mtn, CBSCS, Oceanic PPV	L 33-34	29,717	
September 30	2:00 pm	at Louisiana Tech	Joe Aillet Stadium; Ruston, LA	ESPN2	L 6-27	21,263	
October 10	6:05 pm	Fresno State	Aloha Stadium; Halawa, HI (rivalry)	BSN, Oceanic PPV, KFVE (delayed)	L 17-42	38,566	
October 17	10:00 am	at Idaho	Kibbie Dome; Moscow, ID	ESPN Gameplan, Oceanic PPV, KFVE (delayed)	L 23-35	12,763	
October 24	6:05 pm	No. 6 Boise State	Aloha Stadium; Halawa, HI	KTVB, Oceanic PPV, KFVE (delayed)	L 9-54	37,928	
October 31	11:00 am	at Nevada	Mackay Stadium; Reno, NV	Oceanic PPV, KFVE (delayed)	L 21-31	13,889	
November 7	6:05 pm	Utah State^{†}	Aloha Stadium; Halawa, HI	Oceanic PPV, KFVE (delayed)	W 49–36	31,499	
November 14	6:05 pm	New Mexico State	Aloha Stadium; Halawa, HI	ESPN Gameplan, AggieVision, Oceanic PPV, KFVE (delayed)	W 24–6	32,628	
November 21	3:00 pm	at San Jose State	Spartan Stadium; San Jose, CA (rivalry)	Oceanic PPV, KFVE (delayed)	W 17–10 ^{OT}	18,327	
November 28	6:05 pm	Navy*	Aloha Stadium; Halawa, HI	ESPNU	W 24–17	40,643	
December 5	6:30 pm	Wisconsin*	Aloha Stadium; Halawa, HI	ESPN2	L 10-51	40,069	
*Non-conference game; ^{†}Homecoming; Rankings from AP Poll released prior to the game; All times are in Hawaii–Aleutian time
