= 2009 New Mexico State Aggies football team =

American college football season

2009 New Mexico State Aggies football
- Conference: Western Athletic Conference
- Record: 3–10 (1–7 WAC)
- Head coach: DeWayne Walker (1st season)
- Offensive coordinator: Timm Rosenbach (1st season)
- Offensive scheme: Spread
- Base defense: 4–3
- Home stadium: Aggie Memorial Stadium

2009 Western Athletic Conference football standings
| | Conf. | | | Overall |
| Team | W | | L | W | | L |
|---|---|---|---|---|---|---|
| No. 4 Boise State $% | 8 | – | 0 | 14 | – | 0 |
| Nevada | 7 | – | 1 | 8 | – | 5 |
| Fresno State | 6 | – | 2 | 8 | – | 5 |
| Idaho | 4 | – | 4 | 8 | – | 5 |
| Hawaii | 3 | – | 5 | 6 | – | 7 |
| Louisiana Tech | 3 | – | 5 | 4 | – | 8 |
| Utah State | 3 | – | 5 | 4 | – | 8 |
| New Mexico State | 1 | – | 7 | 3 | – | 10 |
| San Jose State | 1 | – | 7 | 2 | – | 10 |
% – BCS at-large representative; $ – Conference champion; Rankings from AP Poll

The 2009 New Mexico State Aggies football team represented New Mexico State University as members of the Western Athletic Conference (WAC) in the 2009 NCAA Division I FBS football season. The Aggies were led by first–year head coach DeWayne Walker and played their home games at Aggie Memorial Stadium. They finished the season with a record of 3–10 overall and 1–7 in WAC play to tie for eighth place.

== Schedule ==
| Date | Time | Opponent | Site | TV | Result | Attendance | Source |
|---|---|---|---|---|---|---|---|
| September 5 | 6:00 pm | Idaho | Aggie Memorial Stadium; Las Cruces, NM | AV | L 6–21 | 16,772 | |
| September 12 | 6:00 pm | Prairie View A&M* | Aggie Memorial Stadium; Las Cruces, NM | | W 21–18 | 15,902 | |
| September 19 | 6:00 pm | UTEP* | Aggie Memorial Stadium; Las Cruces, NM (Battle of I-10) | AV | L 12–38 | 20,439 | |
| September 26 | 8:00 pm | at New Mexico* | University Stadium; Albuquerque, NM (Rio Grande Rivalry) | mtn | W 20–17 | 35,248 | |
| October 3 | 6:00 pm | at San Diego State* | Qualcomm Stadium; San Diego, CA | | L 17–34 | 24,184 | |
| October 10 | 6:00 pm | Utah State | Aggie Memorial Stadium; Las Cruces, NM | AV | W 20–17 | 15,283 | |
| October 17 | 2:00 pm | at Louisiana Tech | Joe Aillet Stadium; Ruston, LA | | L 7–45 | 20,773 | |
| October 24 | 7:15 pm | Fresno State^{†} | Aggie Memorial Stadium; Las Cruces, NM | ESPNU | L 3–34 | 18,893 | |
| October 31 | 10:00 am | at No. 15 Ohio State* | Ohio Stadium; Columbus, OH | BTN | L 0–45 | 104,719 | |
| November 14 | 9:05 pm | at Hawaii | Aloha Stadium; Honolulu, HI | | L 6–24 | 32,628 | |
| November 21 | 8:30 pm | Nevada | Aggie Memorial Stadium; Las Cruces, NM | ESPNU | L 20–63 | 11,775 | |
| November 28 | 6:00 pm | at San Jose State | Spartan Stadium; San Jose, CA | AV | L 10–13 | 10,117 | |
| December 5 | 1:00 pm | at No. 6 Boise State | Bronco Stadium; Boise, ID | AV | L 7–42 | 32,308 | |
*Non-conference game; ^{†}Homecoming; Rankings from Coaches' Poll released prior to the game; All times are in Mountain time
