= 2009 Utah State Aggies football team =

American college football season

2009 Utah State Aggies football
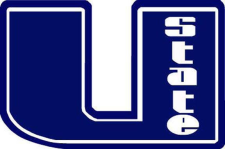
- Conference: Western Athletic Conference
- Record: 4–8 (3–5 WAC)
- Head coach: Gary Andersen (1st season)
- Offensive coordinator: Dave Baldwin (1st season)
- Defensive coordinator: Bill Busch (1st season)
- Home stadium: Romney Stadium

2009 Western Athletic Conference football standings
	Conf.			Overall
Team	W		L	W		L
No. 4 Boise State $%	8	–	0	14	–	0
Nevada	7	–	1	8	–	5
Fresno State	6	–	2	8	–	5
Idaho	4	–	4	8	–	5
Hawaii	3	–	5	6	–	7
Louisiana Tech	3	–	5	4	–	8
Utah State	3	–	5	4	–	8
New Mexico State	1	–	7	3	–	10
San Jose State	1	–	7	2	–	10
% – BCS at-large representative; $ – Conference champion; Rankings from AP Poll

The 2009 Utah State Aggies football team represented Utah State University as a member of the Western Athletic Conference (WAC) in the 2009 NCAA Division I FBS football season. The Aggies were led by first-year head coach Gary Andersen and played their home games at Romney Stadium. Utah State finished the season with a record of 4–8 overall and 3–5 in WAC play.

== Schedule ==
Date	Time	Opponent	Site	TV	Result	Attendance
September 3	7:00 pm	at No. 18 Utah*	Rice-Eccles Stadium; Salt Lake City, UT (Battle of the Brothers)	Mtn.	L 17–35	45,333
September 19	5:00 pm	at Texas A&M*	Kyle Field; College Station, TX		L 30–38	73,599
September 26	6:00 pm	Southern Utah*^{†}	Romney Stadium; Logan, UT		W 53–34	18,472
October 2	7:00 pm	at No. 20 BYU*	LaVell Edwards Stadium; Provo, UT (Beehive Boot)	Mtn.	L 17–35	64,103
October 10	6:00 pm	at New Mexico State	Aggie Memorial Stadium; Las Cruces, NM		L 17–20	15,283
October 17	1:00 pm	Nevada	Romney Stadium; Logan, UT		L 32–35	15,103
October 24	1:00 pm	Louisiana Tech	Romney Stadium; Logan, UT		W 23–21	14,229
October 31	3:00 pm	at Fresno State	Bulldog Stadium; Fresno, CA		L 27–31	27,721
November 7	8:00 pm	at Hawai'i	Aloha Stadium; Honolulu, HI		L 36–49	31,499
November 14	1:00 pm	San Jose State	Romney Stadium; Logan, UT		W 24–9	13,276
November 20	7:30 pm	No. 6 Boise State	Romney Stadium; Logan, UT	ESPN2	L 21–52	18,777
November 28	3:00 pm	at Idaho	Kibbie Dome; Moscow, ID		W 52–49	8,532
*Non-conference game; ^{†}Homecoming; Rankings from Coaches' Poll released prior to the game; All times are in Mountain time
