= 2009 Idaho Vandals football team =

American college football season

2009 Idaho Vandals football

Humanitarian Bowl champion

Humanitarian Bowl, W 43–42 vs. Bowling Green
- Conference: Western Athletic Conference
- Record: 8–5 (4–4 WAC)
- Head coach: Robb Akey (3rd season)
- Offensive coordinator: Steve Axman (3rd season)
- Offensive scheme: Spread
- Defensive coordinator: Mark Criner (3rd season)
- Base defense: 4–3
- Home stadium: Kibbie Dome

2009 Western Athletic Conference football standings
| | Conf. | | | Overall |
| Team | W | | L | W | | L |
|---|---|---|---|---|---|---|
| No. 4 Boise State $% | 8 | – | 0 | 14 | – | 0 |
| Nevada | 7 | – | 1 | 8 | – | 5 |
| Fresno State | 6 | – | 2 | 8 | – | 5 |
| Idaho | 4 | – | 4 | 8 | – | 5 |
| Hawaii | 3 | – | 5 | 6 | – | 7 |
| Louisiana Tech | 3 | – | 5 | 4 | – | 8 |
| Utah State | 3 | – | 5 | 4 | – | 8 |
| New Mexico State | 1 | – | 7 | 3 | – | 10 |
| San Jose State | 1 | – | 7 | 2 | – | 10 |
% – BCS at-large representative; $ – Conference champion; Rankings from AP Poll

The 2009 Idaho Vandals American football team represented the University of Idaho during the 2009 NCAA Division I FBS football season. The Vandals, led by third-year head coach Robb Akey, were members of the Western Athletic Conference (WAC) and played their home games at the Kibbie Dome, an indoor facility on campus in Moscow, Idaho.

By winning seven games, the Vandals achieved a winning record for the first time since 1999 and were bowl eligible for the first time since 1998. They won six of their first seven games in 2009, but lost four of five conference games to finish at 7–5 in the regular season, and placed fourth (4–4) in the nine-team WAC.

Idaho was invited to the Humanitarian Bowl in Boise, in which they defeated the Bowling Green Falcons (7–5) of the MAC on December 30, by a score of 43–42. This was the Vandals' second bowl invitation since returning to Division I-A (FBS) in 1996; Idaho won the same bowl in 1998, also in Boise.

== Schedule ==
| Date | Time | Opponent | Site | TV | Result | Attendance | Source |
|---|---|---|---|---|---|---|---|
| September 5 | 5:00 pm | at New Mexico State | Aggie Memorial Stadium; Las Cruces, NM | | W 21–6 | 16,772 | |
| September 12 | 12:30 pm | at Washington* | Husky Stadium; Seattle, WA | FSN NW | L 23–42 | 58,980 | |
| September 19 | 2:00 pm | San Diego State* | Kibbie Dome; Moscow, ID | | W 34–20 | 10,324 | |
| September 26 | 12:30 pm | at Northern Illinois* | Huskie Stadium; DeKalb, IL | | W 34–31 | 16,320 | |
| October 3 | 7:30 pm | Colorado State* | Kibbie Dome; Moscow, ID | ESPNU | W 31–29 | 16,000 | |
| October 10 | 5:00 pm | at San Jose State | Spartan Stadium; San Jose, CA | | W 29–25 | 15,321 | |
| October 17 | 2:00 pm | Hawaii | Kibbie Dome; Moscow, ID | | W 35–23 | 12,763 | |
| October 24 | 1:00 pm | at Nevada | Mackay Stadium; Reno, NV | | L 45–70 | 16,611 | |
| October 31 | 2:00 pm | Louisiana Tech^{†} | Kibbie Dome; Moscow, ID | ESPN+ | W 35–34 | 15,236 | |
| November 7 | 7:30 pm | Fresno State | Kibbie Dome; Moscow, ID | ESPNU | L 21–31 | 12,418 | |
| November 14 | 12:30 pm | at No. 6 Boise State | Bronco Stadium; Boise, ID (rivalry) | ESPNU | L 25–63 | 33,986 | |
| November 28 | 2:00 pm | Utah State | Kibbie Dome; Moscow, ID | | L 49–52 | 8,532 | |
| December 30 | 1:30 pm | vs. Bowling Green | Bronco Stadium; Boise, ID (Humanitarian Bowl) | ESPN | W 43–42 | 26,726 | |
*Non-conference game; ^{†}Homecoming; Rankings from AP Poll released prior to the game; All times are in Pacific time

Idaho's home attendance in 2009 was 75,273 for six games, an average of 12,545 per game. The maximum was 16,000 for the Colorado State game on October 3. The minimum was 8,532 for Utah State on November 28, two days after Thanksgiving.

== Game summaries ==
=== New Mexico State ===
| | 1 | 2 | 3 | 4 | Total |
|---|---|---|---|---|---|
| Vandals | 14 | 7 | 0 | 0 | 21 |
| Aggies | 0 | 0 | 6 | 0 | 6 |

1st quarter

- 11:38 IDHO- Daniel Hardy 6 Yd Pass From Nathan Enderle (Trey Farquhar Kick) 7-0
- 03:28 IDHO- Princeton McCarty 1 Yd Run (Trey Farquhar Kick) 14-0

2nd quarter

- 05:31 IDHO- Max Komar 38 Yd Pass From Nathan Enderle (Trey Farquhar Kick) 21-0

3rd quarter

- 02:37 NMSU- Tonny Glynn 3 Yd Run (Pat Failed) 21-6

=== Washington ===
| | 1 | 2 | 3 | 4 | Total |
|---|---|---|---|---|---|
| Vandals | 3 | 6 | 7 | 7 | 23 |
| Huskies | 7 | 14 | 14 | 7 | 42 |

1st quarter

- 06:24 WASH- Jake Locker 3 Yd Run (Erik Folk Kick) 0-7
- 00:13 IDHO- Trey Farquhar 44 Yd FG 3-7

2nd quarter

- 10:47 WASH- Johri Fogerson 24 Yd Pass From Jake Locker (Erik Folk Kick) 3-14
- 06:16 IDHO- Trey Farquhar 28 Yd FG 6-14
- 01:31 WASH- James Johnson 31 Yd Pass From Jake Locker (Erik Folk Kick) 6-21
- 00:00 IDHO- Trey Farquhar 34 Yd FG 9-21

3rd quarter

- 12:11 WASH- Chris Polk 1 Yd Run (Erik Folk Kick)9-28
- 10:17 WASH- Chris Izbicki 2 Yd Pass From Jake Locker (Erik Folk Kick) 9-35
- 03:58 IDHO- DeMaundray Woolridge 4 Yd Run (Trey Farquhar Kick) 16-35

4th quarter

- 09:15 WASH- Johri Fogerson 2 Yd Run (Erik Folk Kick) 16-42
- 00:12 IDHO- DeMaundray Woolridge 6 Yd Run (Trey Farquhar Kick) 23-42

=== San Diego State ===
| | 1 | 2 | 3 | 4 | Total |
|---|---|---|---|---|---|
| Aztecs | 0 | 10 | 3 | 7 | 20 |
| Vandals | 14 | 6 | 0 | 14 | 34 |

1st quarter

- 11:42 IDHO- Joseph Dickson 74 Yd Interception Return (Trey Farquhar Kick) 0-7
- 01:44 IDHO- Deonte' Jackson 4 Yd Run (Trey Farquhar Kick) 0-14

2nd quarter

- 12:26 SDSU- Lane Yoshida 47 Yd FG 3-14
- 06:35 IDHO- Trey Farquhar 29 Yd FG 3-17
- 01:50 SDSU- Roberto Wallace 8 Yd Pass From Drew Westling (Lane Yoshida Kick) 10-17
- 00:00 IDHO- Trey Farquhar 40 Yd FG 10-20

3rd quarter

- 09:32 SDSU- Lane Yoshida 46 Yd FG 13-20

4th quarter

- 06:39 IDHO- DeMaundray Woolridge 7 Yd Run (Trey Farquhar Kick) 13-27
- 04:58 SDSU- Vincent Brown 36 Yd Pass From Ryan Lindley (Lane Yoshida Kick) 20-27
- 02:31 IDHO- DeMaundray Woolridge 53 Yd Run (Trey Farquhar Kick) 20-34

=== Northern Illinois ===
| | 1 | 2 | 3 | 4 | Total |
|---|---|---|---|---|---|
| Vandals | 0 | 21 | 7 | 6 | 34 |
| Huskies | 3 | 10 | 3 | 15 | 31 |

1st quarter

- 08:57 NIU- Mike Salerno 23 Yd FG 0-3

2nd quarter

- 13:07 IDHO- Daniel Hardy 26 Yd Pass From Nathan Enderle (Trey Farquhar Kick) 7-3
- 05:34 IDHO- Deonte' Jackson 21 Yd Pass From Nathan Enderle (Trey Farquhar Kick) 14-3
- 01:50 NIU- Willie Clark 7 Yd Pass From Chandler Harnish (Mike Salerno Kick) 14-10
- 00:47 IDHO- Princeton McCarty 58 Yd Pass From Nathan Enderle (Trey Farquhar Kick) 21-10
- 00:00 NIU- Mike Salerno 50 Yd FG 21-13

3rd quarter

- 07:59 IDHO- DeMaundray Woolridge 1 Yd Run (Trey Farquhar Kick) 28-13
- 03:12 NIU- Mike Salerno 25 Yd FG 28-16

4th quarter

- 14:41 IDHO- Trey Farquhar 33 Yd FG 31-16
- 11:30 IDHO- Trey Farquhar 40 Yd FG 34-16
- 08:25 NIU- Landon Cox 4 Yd Pass From Chandler Harnish (Mike Salerno Kick) 34-23
- 05:51 NIU- Me'co Brown 1 Yd Run (Me'Co Brown Run For Two-Point Conversion) 34-31

=== Colorado State ===
| | 1 | 2 | 3 | 4 | Total |
|---|---|---|---|---|---|
| Rams | 14 | 6 | 3 | 6 | 29 |
| Vandals | 0 | 10 | 14 | 7 | 31 |

1st quarter

- 08:01 CSU- Tyson Liggett 20 Yd Pass From Grant Stucker (Ben Deline Kick) 7-0
- 00:00 CSU- Eric Peitz 3 Yd Pass From Grant Stucker (Ben Deline Kick) 14-0

2nd quarter

- 07:06 IDHO- Eric Greenwood 31 Yd Pass From Nathan Enderle (Trey Farquhar Kick) 14-7
- 01:36 CSU- Dion Morton 34 Yd Pass From Grant Stucker (Pat Blocked) 20-7
- 00:55 IDHO- Trey Farquhar 47 Yd FG 20-10

3rd quarter

- 13:38 IDHO- Eric Greenwood 45 Yd Pass From Nathan Enderle (Trey Farquhar Kick) 20-17
- 06:22 IDHO- Max Komar 24 Yd Pass From Nathan Enderle (Trey Farquhar Kick) 20-24
- 02:03 CSU- Ben DeLine 43 Yd FG 23-24

4th quarter

- 14:31 IDHO- DeMaundray Woolridge 1 Yd Run (Trey Farquhar Kick) 23-31
- 01:49 CSU- Lou Greenwood 39 Yd Pass From Grant Stucker (Two-Point Run Conversion Failed) 29-31

=== San José State ===
| | 1 | 2 | 3 | 4 | Total |
|---|---|---|---|---|---|
| Vandals | 3 | 9 | 10 | 7 | 29 |
| Spartans | 7 | 7 | 0 | 11 | 25 |

1st quarter

- 09:07 SJSU- Josh Harrison 17 Yd Pass From Jordan La Secla (Tyler Cope Kick) 0-7
- 03:05 IDHO- Trey Farquhar 23 Yd FG 3-7

2nd quarter

- 11:47 IDHO- DeMaundray Woolridge 1 Yd Run (Pat Blocked) 9-7
- 02:47 SJSU- Jordan La Secla 7 Yd Run (Tyler Cope Kick) 9-14
- 00:00 IDHO- Trey Farquhar 52 Yd FG 12-14

3rd quarter

- 11:56 IDHO- Princeton McCarty 3 Yd Run (Trey Farquhar Kick) 19-14
- 02:55 IDHO- Trey Farquhar 26 Yd FG 22-14

4th quarter

- 14:54 SJSU- Marquis Avery 38 Yd Pass From Jordan La Secla (Jordan La Secla Pass To Jalal Beauchman For Two-Point Conversion) 22-22
- 10:46 SJSU- Tyler Cope 20 Yd FG 22-25
- 01:10 IDHO- DeMaundray Woolridge 5 Yd Run (Trey Farquhar Kick) 29-25

=== Hawai'i ===
| | 1 | 2 | 3 | 4 | Total |
|---|---|---|---|---|---|
| Warriors | 10 | 0 | 0 | 13 | 23 |
| Vandals | 14 | 0 | 7 | 14 | 35 |

1st quarter

- 12:09 IDHO- DeMaundray Woolridge 28 Yd Run (Trey Farquhar Kick) 0-7
- 08:55 HAW- Inoke Funaki 8 Yd Run (Scott Enos Kick) 7-7
- 08:00 IDHO- Maurice Shaw 60 Yd Pass From Nathan Enderle (Trey Farquhar Kick) 7-14
- 02:40 HAW- Scott Enos 22 Yd FG 10-14

3rd quarter

- 05:37 IDHO- DeMaundray Woolridge 4 Yd Run (Trey Farquhar Kick) 10-21

4th quarter

- 14:18 HAW- Bryant Moniz 15 Yd Run (Scott Enos Kick) 17-21
- 08:46 IDHO- DeMaundray Woolridge 1 Yd Run (Trey Farquhar Kick) 17-28
- 01:08 IDHO- DeMaundray Woolridge 6 Yd Run (Trey Farquhar Kick) 17-35
- 00:19 HAW- Greg Salas 21 Yd Pass From Bryant Moniz (Two-Point Conversion Failed) 23-35

=== Nevada ===
| | 1 | 2 | 3 | 4 | Total |
|---|---|---|---|---|---|
| Vandals | 0 | 24 | 14 | 7 | 45 |
| Wolf Pack | 14 | 14 | 21 | 21 | 70 |

1st quarter

- 09:27 NEV- Colin Kaepernick 11 Yd Run (Richard Drake Kick) 0-7
- 04:42 NEV- Vai Taua 89 Yd Run (Richard Drake Kick) 0-14

2nd quarter

- 13:26 NEV- Colin Kaepernick 61 Yd Run (Richard Drake Kick) 0-21
- 12:47 IDHO- Maurice Shaw 73 Yd Pass From Nathan Enderle (Trey Farquhar Kick) 7-21
- 11:15 IDHO- Deonte' Jackson 59 Yd Run (Trey Farquhar Kick) 14-21
- 04:12 NEV- Vai Taua 1 Yd Run (Richard Drake Kick) 14-28
- 03:06 IDHO- Maurice Shaw 73 Yd Pass From Nathan Enderle (Trey Farquhar Kick) 21-28
- 00:35 IDHO- Trey Farquhar 54 Yd FG 24-28

3rd quarter

- 14:09 NEV- Colin Kaepernick 35 Yd Run (Richard Drake Kick) 24-35
- 10:29 NEV- Colin Kaepernick 75 Yd Run (Richard Drake Kick) 24-42
- 06:11 IDHO- Max Komar 9 Yd Pass From Nathan Enderle (Trey Farquhar Kick) 31-42
- 01:52 NEV- Chris Wellington 25 Yd Run (Richard Drake Kick) 31-49
- 00:48 IDHO- Max Komar 20 Yd Pass From Nathan Enderle (Trey Farquhar Kick) 38-49

4th quarter

- 14:23 NEV- Virgil Green 44 Yd Pass From Colin Kaepernick (Richard Drake Kick) 38-56
- 09:30 NEV- Luke Lippincott 9 Yd Pass From Colin Kaepernick (Richard Drake Kick) 38-63
- 07:09 NEV- Lampford Mark 12 Yd Run (Richard Drake Kick) 38-70
- 02:55 IDHO- Max Komar 14 Yd Pass From Brian Reader (Trey Farquhar Kick) 45-70

=== Louisiana Tech ===
| | 1 | 2 | 3 | 4 | Total |
|---|---|---|---|---|---|
| Bulldogs | 21 | 7 | 0 | 6 | 34 |
| Vandals | 7 | 7 | 7 | 14 | 35 |

1st quarter

- 14:45 IDHO- Justin Veltung 94 Yd Kickoff Return (Trey Farquhar Kick) 0-7
- 13:01 LT- Cruz Williams 17 Yd Pass From Ross Jenkins (Matt Nelson Kick) 7-7
- 09:27 LT- Daniel Porter 3 Yd Run (Matt Nelson Kick) 14-7
- 02:48 LT- Dennis Morris 10 Yd Pass From Ross Jenkins (Matt Nelson Kick) 21-7

2nd quarter

- 14:49 IDHO- Max Komar 36 Yd Pass From Nathan Enderle (Trey Farquhar Kick) 21-14
- 06:19 LT- Cruz Williams 20 Yd Pass From Ross Jenkins (Matt Nelson Kick) 28-14

3rd quarter

- 10:38 IDHO- Max Komar 32 Yd Pass From Nathan Enderle (Trey Farquhar Kick) 28-21

4th quarter

- 14:57 LT- Myke Compton 1 Yd Run (Pat Failed) 34-21
- 05:51 IDHO- DeMaundray Woolridge 1 Yd Run (Trey Farquhar Kick) 34-28
- 00:52 IDHO- DeMaundray Woolridge 2 Yd Run (Trey Farquhar Kick) 34-35

=== Fresno State ===
| | 1 | 2 | 3 | 4 | Total |
|---|---|---|---|---|---|
| Vandals | 0 | 0 | 7 | 14 | 21 |
| Bulldogs | 17 | 7 | 7 | 0 | 31 |

1st quarter

- 14:41 FRES- Ryan Mathews 77 Yd Run (Kevin Goessling Kick) 7-0
- 08:32 FRES- Seyi Ajirotutu 18 Yd Pass From Ryan Colburn (Kevin Goessling Kick) 14-0
- 01:26 FRES- Kevin Goessling 52 Yd FG 17-0

2nd quarter

- 01:07 FRES- Ryan Mathews 1 Yd Run (Kevin Goessling Kick) 24-0

3rd quarter

- 05:51 IDHO- Max Komar 14 Yd Pass From Brian Reader (Trey Farquhar Kick) 24-7
- 00:47 FRES- Ryan Mathews 1 Yd Run (Kevin Goessling Kick) 31-7

4th quarter

- 12:21 IDHO- Brian Reader 4 Yd Run (Brian Reader Pass To Eric Greenwood For Two-Point Conversion) 31-15
- 00:25 IDHO- Maurice Shaw 69 Yd Pass From Brian Reader (Two-Point Pass Conversion Failed) 31-21

=== Boise State ===
| | 1 | 2 | 3 | 4 | Total |
|---|---|---|---|---|---|
| Vandals | 7 | 10 | 0 | 8 | 25 |
| #6 Broncos | 21 | 21 | 14 | 7 | 63 |

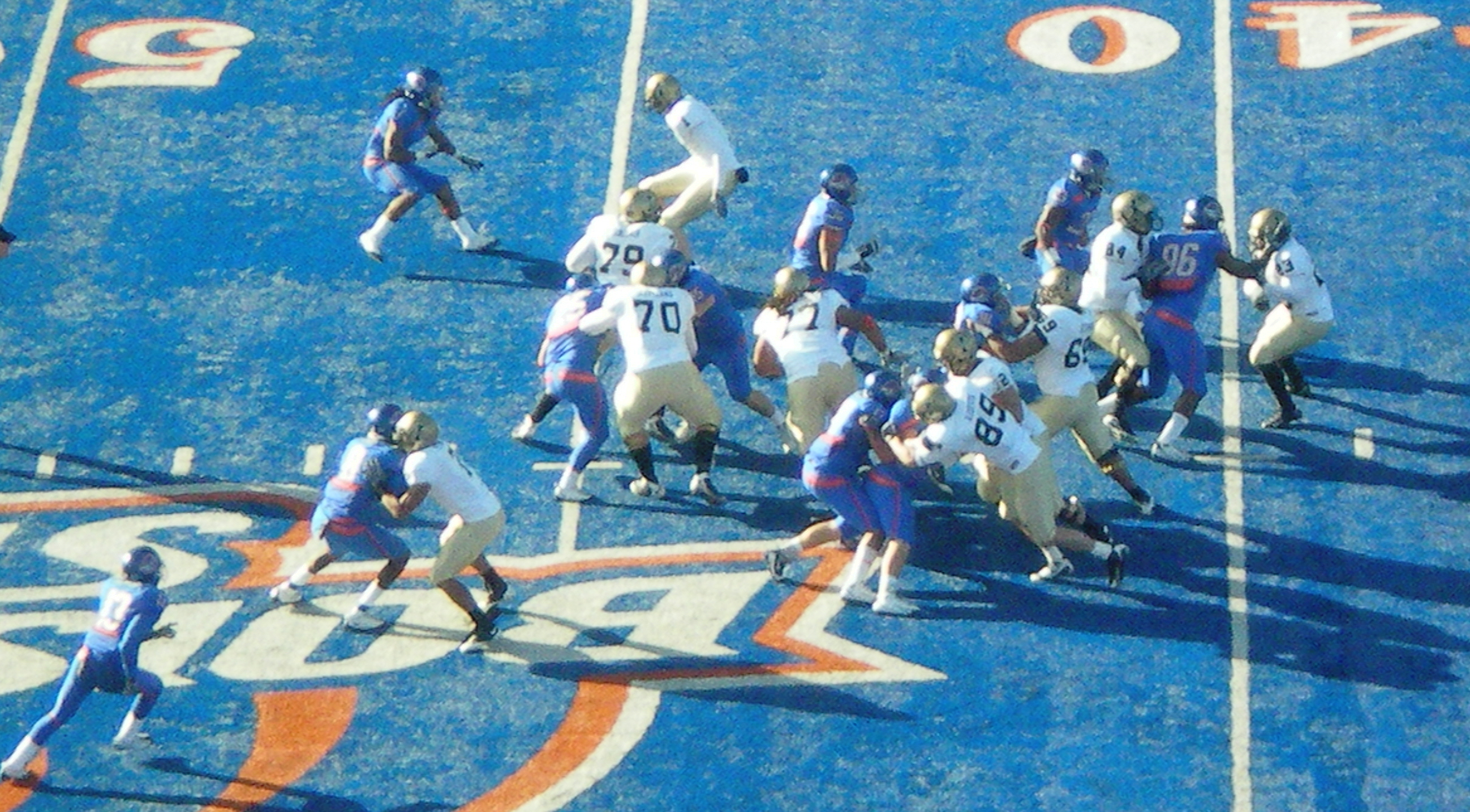
Vandals on offense during the first half.

1st quarter

- 12:11 BSU- Austin Pettis 4 Yd Pass From Kellen Moore (Austin Pettis Pass To Kyle Efaw For Two-Point Conversion) 0-8
- 10:46 BSU- Titus Young 25 Yd Pass From Kellen Moore (Two-Point Pass Conversion Failed) 0-14
- 06:28 IDHO- DeMaundray Woolridge 29 Yd Run (Trey Farquhar Kick) 7-14
- 04:35 BSU- Austin Pettis 8 Yd Pass From Kellen Moore (Kyle Brotzman Kick) 7-21

2nd quarter

- 12:46 IDHO- Trey Farquhar 30 Yd FG 10-21
- 09:10 BSU- Jeremy Avery 1 Yd Run (Kyle Brotzman Kick) 10-28
- 05:23 BSU- Austin Pettis 20 Yd Pass From Kellen Moore (Kyle Brotzman Kick) 10-35
- 00:27 IDHO- DeMaundray Woolridge 1 Yd Run (Trey Farquhar Kick) 17-35
- 00:14 BSU- Titus Young 100 Yd Kickoff Return (Kyle Brotzman Kick) 17-42

3rd quarter

- 10:20 BSU- Kyle Wilson 71 Yd Interception Return (Kyle Brotzman Kick) 17-49
- 07:12 BSU- Kyle Efaw 11 Yd Pass From Matt Kaiserman (Kyle Brotzman Kick) 17-56

4th quarter

- 14:55 BSU- Austin Pettis 14 Yd Pass From Kellen Moore (Kyle Brotzman Kick) 17-63
- 00:27 IDHO- Princeton McCarty 52 Yd Pass From Brian Reader (Deonte' Jackson Run For Two-Point Conversion) 25-63

=== Utah State ===
| | 1 | 2 | 3 | 4 | Total |
|---|---|---|---|---|---|
| Aggies | 21 | 10 | 0 | 21 | 52 |
| Vandals | 7 | 14 | 14 | 14 | 49 |

1st quarter

- 11:23 USU- Robert Turbin 3 Yd Run (Chris Ulinski Kick) 7-0
- 08:26 IDHO- Preston Davis 11 Yd Run (Trey Farquhar Kick) 7-7
- 07:24 USU- Xavier Bowman 85 Yd Pass From Diondre Borel (Chris Ulinski Kick) 14-7
- 03:50 USU- Robert Turbin 48 Yd Pass From Diondre Borel (Chris Ulinski Kick) 21-7

2nd quarter

- 12:07 USU- Robert Turbin 22 Yd Pass From Diondre Borel (Chris Ulinski Kick) 28-7
- 08:43 USU- Chris Ulinski 48 Yd FG 31-7
- 05:38 IDHO- Max Komar 30 Yd Pass From Nathan Enderle (Trey Farquhar Kick) 31-14
- 01:37 IDHO- Max Komar 15 Yd Pass From Nathan Enderle (Trey Farquhar Kick) 31-21

3rd quarter

- 09:55 IDHO- Princeton McCarty 17 Yd Run (Trey Farquhar Kick) 31-28
- 04:02 IDHO- Maurice Shaw 7 Yd Pass From Nathan Enderle (Trey Farquhar Kick) 31-35

4th quarter

- 12:51 USU- Robert Turbin 1 Yd Run (Chris Ulinski Kick) 38-35
- 09:41 IDHO- Maurice Shaw 29 Yd Pass From Brian Reader (Trey Farquhar Kick) 38-42
- 09:05 USU- Stanley Morrison 75 Yd Pass From Diondre Borel (Chris Ulinski Kick) 45-42
- 08:46 USU- Robert Turbin 1 Yd Run (Chris Ulinski Kick) 52-42
- 01:16 IDHO- Daniel Hardy 10 Yd Pass From Brian Reader (Trey Farquhar Kick) 52-49

=== Humanitarian Bowl - Bowling Green ===
| | 1 | 2 | 3 | 4 | Total |
|---|---|---|---|---|---|
| Falcons | 14 | 0 | 7 | 21 | 42 |
| Vandals | 7 | 7 | 14 | 15 | 43 |

1st quarter

- 11:44 BGSU- Freddie Barnes 35 Yd Pass From Tyler Sheehan (Matthew Norsic Kick) 7-0
- 07:49 IDHO- Peter Bjorvik 3 Yd Pass From Nathan Enderle (Trey Farquhar Kick) 7-7
- 00:19 BGSU- Willie Geter 59 Yd Run (Matthew Norsic Kick) 14-7

2nd quarter

- 00:19 IDHO- Eric Greenwood 7 Yd Pass From Nathan Enderle (Trey Farquhar Kick) 14-14

3rd quarter

- 09:25 IDHO- DeMaundray Woolridge 8 Yd Run (Trey Farquhar Kick) 14-21
- 05:30 IDHO- DeMaundray Woolridge 13 Yd Run (Trey Farquhar Kick) 14-28
- 03:40 BGSU- Jimmy Scheidler 15 Yd Pass From Tyler Sheehan (Matthew Norsic Kick) 21-28

4th quarter

- 12:15 BGSU- Freddie Barnes 5 Yd Pass From Tyler Sheehan (Matthew Norsic Kick) 28-28
- 08:32 IDHO- Preston Davis 30 Yd Pass From Nathan Enderle (Trey Farquhar Kick) 28-35
- 03:51 BGSU- Willie Geter 2 Yd Run (Matthew Norsic Kick) 35-35
- 00:32 BGSU- Freddie Barnes 51 Yd Pass From Tyler Sheehan (Matthew Norsic Kick) 42-35
- 00:04 IDHO- Max Komar 16 Yd Pass From Nathan Enderle (Nathan Enderle Pass To Preston Davis For Two-Point Conversion) 42-43

== NFL draft ==
One Vandal was selected in the 2010 NFL draft:

| Player | Position | Round | Overall | Franchise |
| Mike Iupati | G | 1st | 17 | San Francisco 49ers |
