= 2009 San Jose State Spartans football team =

American college football season

2009 San Jose State Spartans football
- Conference: Western Athletic Conference
- Record: 2–10 (1–7 WAC)
- Head coach: Dick Tomey (5th season)
- Co-offensive coordinators: Brent Brennan (1st season); Steve Morton (3rd season)
- Defensive coordinator: Keith Burns (3rd season)
- Home stadium: Spartan Stadium

2009 Western Athletic Conference football standings
	Conf.			Overall
Team	W		L	W		L
No. 4 Boise State $%	8	–	0	14	–	0
Nevada	7	–	1	8	–	5
Fresno State	6	–	2	8	–	5
Idaho	4	–	4	8	–	5
Hawaii	3	–	5	6	–	7
Louisiana Tech	3	–	5	4	–	8
Utah State	3	–	5	4	–	8
New Mexico State	1	–	7	3	–	10
San Jose State	1	–	7	2	–	10
% – BCS at-large representative; $ – Conference champion; Rankings from AP Poll

The 2009 San Jose State Spartans football team represented San Jose State University in the 2009 NCAA Division I FBS college football season. The Spartans, led by 5th year head coach Dick Tomey, played their home games at Spartan Stadium. The Spartans finished the season with a record of 2–10 and 1–7 in WAC play. Head coach Dick Tomey retired at the end of the season.

== Schedule ==
Date	Time	Opponent	Site	TV	Result	Attendance	Source
September 5	12:30 pm	at No. 4 USC*	Los Angeles Memorial Coliseum; Los Angeles, CA	FSN	L 3–56	84,325	
September 12	7:30 pm	No. 17 Utah*	Spartan Stadium; San Jose, CA	ESPNU	L 14–24	23,684	
September 19	6:00 pm	at Stanford*	Stanford Stadium; Stanford, CA (Bill Walsh Legacy Game)		L 17–42	33,560	
September 26	5:00 pm	Cal Poly*	Spartan Stadium; San Jose, CA		W 19–9	13,510	
October 10	5:00 pm	Idaho^{†}	Spartan Stadium; San Jose, CA		L 25–29	15,321	
October 17	7:00 pm	at Fresno State	Bulldog Stadium; Fresno, CA (rivalry)		L 21–41	35,495	
October 31	12:00 pm	at No. 5 Boise State	Bronco Stadium; Boise, ID		L 7–45	31,684	
November 8	5:30 pm	Nevada	Spartan Stadium; San Jose, CA	ESPN	L 7–62	11,103	
November 14	1:00 pm	at Utah State	Romney Stadium; Logan, UT		L 9–24	13,276	
November 21	5:00 pm	Hawaii	Spartan Stadium; San Jose, CA (Dick Tomey Legacy Game)		L 10–17 ^{OT}	18,327	
November 28	5:00 pm	New Mexico State	Spartan Stadium; San Jose, CA		W 13–10	10,117	
December 5	1:00 pm	at Louisiana Tech	Joe Aillet Stadium; Ruston, LA		L 20–55	15,324	
*Non-conference game; ^{†}Homecoming; Rankings from AP Poll released prior to the game; All times are in Pacific time

== Game summaries ==
=== At No. 4 USC ===
	1	2	3	4	Total
Spartans	3	0	0	0	3
Trojans	0	28	14	14	56

=== No. 17 Utah ===
	1	2	3	4	Total
Utes	7	0	0	17	24
Spartans	0	7	0	7	14

=== At Stanford ===
	1	2	3	4	Total
Spartans	0	7	3	7	17
Cardinal	14	7	21	0	42

=== Cal Poly ===
	1	2	3	4	Total
Mustangs	6	3	0	0	9
Spartans	0	6	7	6	19

=== Idaho ===
	1	2	3	4	Total
Vandals	3	9	10	7	29
Spartans	7	7	0	11	25

=== At Fresno State ===
	1	2	3	4	Total
Spartans	14	0	0	7	21
Bulldogs	7	24	0	10	41

=== At No. 5 Boise State ===
	1	2	3	4	Total
Spartans	0	7	0	0	7
No. 5 Broncos	7	17	14	7	45

=== Nevada ===
	1	2	3	4	Total
Wolf Pack	6	28	14	14	62
Spartans	0	0	0	7	7

=== At Utah State ===
	1	2	3	4	Total
Spartans	0	0	9	0	9
Aggies	7	7	0	10	24

=== Hawaii ===
	1	2	3	4	OT	Total
Warriors	7	0	0	3	7	17
Spartans	0	7	0	3	0	10

=== New Mexico State ===
	1	2	3	4	Total
Aggies	0	7	3	0	10
Spartans	7	3	0	3	13

=== At Louisiana Tech ===
	1	2	3	4	Total
Spartans	14	0	6	0	20
Bulldogs	14	31	3	7	55

== Coaching staff ==
Name	Position	Seasons at San Jose State	Alma mater
Dick Tomey	Head coach	5	DePauw (1960)
Keith Burns	Defensive coordinator, cornerbacks	6	Arkansas (1982)
Kent Baer	Linebackers	2	Utah State (1973)
Steve Morton	Co-offensive coordinator, offensive line	5	Washington State (1975)
Brent Brennan	Co-offensive coordinator, offensive tackles, tight ends, special teams	5	UCLA (1996)
Kinji Green	Defensive ends	5	San Jose State (2006)
Joe Salave'a	Defensive line	2	Arizona (1997)
Charles Nash	Running backs	9	Arizona (1997)
Ken Margerum	Wide receivers, recruiting coordinator	5	Stanford (1981)
Terry Malley	Running backs, assistant head coach, quarterbacks coach	1	Santa Clara (1976)
Mayur Chaudhari	Graduate assistant, safeties	2	UC Davis (2005)
Ezekiel Staples	Graduate assistant, defense	3	San Jose State (2008)
