= Ryan Winterswyk =

American football player (born 1987)

No. 86
- Position: Tight end

Personal information
- Born: February 10, 1987 (age 39); La Habra, California, U.S.
- Listed height: 6 ft 4 in (1.93 m)
- Listed weight: 269 lb (122 kg)

Career information
- College: Boise State
- NFL draft: 2011: undrafted

Career history
- Atlanta Falcons (2011)*
- * Offseason or practice squad member only

Awards and highlights
- All-WAC, 2008, 2009, 2010
- Stats at Pro Football Reference

Ryan Winterswyk (born February 10, 1987) is an American former football tight end. He was signed by the Atlanta Falcons as an undrafted free agent in 2011. He played college football at Boise State. Despite beginning his college football careers as a walk on, he was selected as a first-team All-WAC player three consecutive years and was selected as the Most Valuable Defensive Player for the 2008 and 2009 Boise State teams that were undefeated in the regular season.

== Boise State ==
=== From walk on to All-Decade Team ===
Winterswyk attended high school in La Habra, California. Despite having 150 tackles as a senior at La Habra High School, Winterswyk "got little love from recruiters." He considered playing in junior college when the secondary coach from Boise State University suggested he enroll there, but as a walk on with no scholarship. He followed that suggestion and enrolled at Boise State in 2007. He was a walk on at the safety position in January 2007. He was a four-year starter on defense for the Boise State Broncos football team from 2007 to 2010. He was selected as a first-team All-WAC player three consecutive years (2008, 2009, and 2010) and was a key defensive player for Boise State teams that compiled an overall record of 38–2 from 2008 to 2010, including an undefeated 14–0 record in 2009. He was a defensive starter in 43 games for Boise State from 2007 to 2010. Despite his original walk-on status, Winterswyk is acknowledged as "one of the best defensive ends in school history."

=== 2007 season ===
As a red-shirt freshman in 2007, he led the team with nine tackles for loss and was selected as an honorable mention Freshman All-American by The Sporting News.

=== 2008 season ===
As a sophomore in 2008, he was selected as a first-team All-WAC player and was named the Co-Most Valuable Defensive Player on a Boise State team that compiled a 12-0 record in the regular season and was ranked third in the country in scoring defense (allowing only 12.6 points per game).

=== 2009 season ===
As a junior in 2009, Winterswyk was placed on both the Lott and Lombardi Award watch lists. He received his second consecutive first-team All-WAC honor and was named the Most Valuable Defensive Player on a Boise State team that compiled a perfect 14-0 record. In January 2011, he was named to the WAC All-Decade Team for the 2000s.

=== Cover of Sports Illustrated ===
After its 14-0 finish in 2009, Sports Illustrated picked Boise State as a contender for the national championship. In the August 2010 issue announcing its pre-season picks, a photograph of Winterswyk and two other players appeared on the magazine's cover. In its feature story on the rise of Boise State, Sports Illustrated devoted four paragraphs to Winterswyk. The article noted:

Winterswyk has gone from walk-on to four-year starter. His 19 career sacks include a clutch fourth-quarter takedown of Dalton in the Fiesta Bowl. Once a clueless freshman who struggled to master a three-point stance, he's now the star of a defense returning 10 starters. His rapid ascent embodies the Boise State program, which in 15 seasons has risen from I-AA to serial BCS buster.

The Orange County Register took note of Winterswyk's fame: "Ryan Winterswyk, a 2005 La Habra High School grad, graces the cover of the Aug. 16 Sports Illustrated, and is also featured in an article on the inside pages." In an interview with the Los Angeles Times, Winterswyk credited the players who laid the foundation for Boise State's development and noted his desire to meet expectations: "You don't want to be on the cover of SI and then go blow it all." In an on-line edition in October 2010, SI.com again published a photograph of Winterswyk with the caption: "Ryan Winterswyk and Boise State rank No. 1 nationally in total defense, rushing defense and pass-efficiency defense."

=== 2010 season ===
As a senior in 2010, Winterswyk was slowed early in the season by a knee injury that required him to undergo surgery. However, he remained such a dominant defensive player that opposing coaches regularly assigned two players to block him. He started all 12 games at defensive end for Boise State and received his third consecutive first-team All-WAC honor. Winterswyk was also a finalist for the Burlsworth Trophy, given to outstanding college football players who began their careers as a walk-on. He was also invited to play in the annual East-West Shrine Game in January 2011 in Orlando, Florida.

== Professional career ==
Winterswyk was signed by the Atlanta Falcons as an undrafted free agent following the 2011 NFL draft on July 27, 2011. The Falcons converted him to tight end after playing defensive end at Boise State. He was released during final cuts on September 3, 2011. He spent the final five weeks of the season on the team's practice squad before being re-signed to the active roster following the season. He announced his retirement from the NFL on April 30, 2012.
