= Dennis Morris (American football) =

American football player (born 1987)

No. 40
- Position: Tight end

Personal information
- Born: February 15, 1987 (age 39); Shreveport, Louisiana, U.S.
- Listed height: 6 ft 2 in (1.88 m)
- Listed weight: 260 lb (118 kg)

Career information
- High school: Woodlawn (Shreveport)
- College: Louisiana Tech
- NFL draft: 2010: 6th round, 174th overall pick

Career history
- Washington Redskins (2010)*; St. Louis Rams (2010); San Diego Chargers (2011)*; West Texas Wildcatters (2014)
- * Offseason or practice squad member only

Awards and highlights
- All-American (2009); First-team All-Western Athletic Conference (2009)
- Stats at Pro Football Reference

Dennis Morris (born February 15, 1987) is an American former professional football player who was a tight end in the National Football League (NFL). Morris played college football for the Louisiana Tech Bulldogs, earning All-American honors in 2009. He was selected in the sixth round of the 2010 NFL draft by the Washington Redskins.

He was also a member of the St. Louis Rams, San Diego Chargers, and West Texas Wildcatters.

== Early life ==
Morris was born in Shreveport, Louisiana, where he attended and played high school football for Woodlawn High School. A multi-talented athlete, he played wide receiver, running back, quarterback, and linebacker while in high school. In his career, he totaled 1,947 yards rushing and 26 touchdowns, as well as 216 career tackles and eight interceptions. Morris earned all-district honors three times and was named to the Shreveport Times All-City team as a senior.

Morris also ran track and played basketball. As a senior, he was named the District 1-4A MVP in basketball.

== College career ==
Morris played college football at Louisiana Tech University. He played in 48 career games with 21 starts, and totaled 70 career receptions for 1,144 yards and 16 touchdowns.

As a freshman, Morris played in all 13 games (two started) as a tight end, a position he did not play in high school. In the third game of the season, he recorded 103 receiving yards in a loss against Texas A&M University. On November 4, 2006, he caught his first touchdown reception in a win against the University of North Texas. Morris finished the season with 16 receptions for 284 yards and three touchdowns.

Morris played in all 12 games as a sophomore and had nine catches for 79 yards. In addition to playing tight end, he was also used as a blocking back and running back in goal-line situations. On September 8, 2007, he scored his first career rushing touchdown in a 45-44 overtime loss against the University of Hawaii. During his junior season, Morris played in all 13 games and started seven. He had seven receptions for 158 yards and one touchdown.

As a senior, Morris earned first-team All-Western Athletic Conference and All-American honors and had a team-high 38 receptions for 623 yards and 12 touchdowns. His twelve touchdowns were the most nationally by a tight end. On November 21, 2009, he set career-highs in receptions (seven), receiving yards (131) and touchdowns (three) in a loss against Fresno State University. He became the first Louisiana Tech player since 1999 to catch three touchdown passes in a game. When his college career ended, he ranked tenth in school history with 16 touchdown receptions.

== Professional career ==
Pre-draft measurables
Height	Weight	40-yard dash	10-yard split	20-yard split	20-yard shuttle	Three-cone drill	Vertical jump	Broad jump	Bench press	Wonderlic
6 ft 1 1/8 in (1.86 m)	265 lb (120 kg)	4.82 s	1.73 s	2.81 s	4.65 s	7.26 s	29 in (0.74 m)	9 ft 1 in (2.77 m)	20 reps	x
All values from LA Tech Pro Day

=== Washington Redskins ===
Morris was selected in the sixth round (174th overall) of the 2010 NFL draft by the Washington Redskins. He signed a four-year $1.823 million contract, including a $118,000 signing bonus, with the Redskins on June 11, 2010.

=== St. Louis Rams ===
On August 30, 2010, Morris was traded to the St. Louis Rams for an undisclosed conditional draft pick.

=== San Diego Chargers ===
On January 12, 2011, Morris was signed to a reserve/future contract by the San Diego Chargers. He was waived/injured on August 24, and after passing through waivers unclaimed, reverted to injured reserve.

=== West Texas Wildcatters ===
In 2014, Morris signed to play for the West Texas Wildcatters of the Lone Star Football League.
