= Tyson Lee (American football) =

American football player (born 1987)

No. 16
- Position: Quarterback

Personal information
- Born: December 19, 1987 (age 38); Columbus, Mississippi, U.S.
- Listed height: 5 ft 10 in (1.78 m)
- Listed weight: 200 lb (91 kg)

Career information
- High school: Columbus High School
- College: Itawamba CC (2006–2007); Mississippi State (2008–2009)

Tyson Paul Lee (born December 19, 1987) is an American former football quarterback who played for the Mississippi State Bulldogs during the 2008 and 2009 seasons. He later worked for the St. Louis Rams as a scout.

Lee led his Columbus High School football team to the playoffs his senior year and was named his Region's most valuable player. He also played baseball and soccer. He did not receive any major conference offers out of high school, so he committed to play football for Itawamba Community College instead.

In two years at ICC, Lee compiled a 14–4 record as a starter and was Itawamba's first ever player to be named a First Team JUCO All-American and an Academic All-American. At ICC, Lee threw 19 touchdown passes against 7 interceptions. He enrolled as a walk-on at Mississippi State in January 2008, hoping to back up or possibly win the starting quarterback job from Wesley Carroll.

Lee started the final eight games for the Bulldogs in 2008. In his first start, he threw for 175 yards and 1 touchdown without an interception in a 34–24 loss to LSU. Lee led the Bulldogs to two victories over SEC opponents, #13 Vanderbilt and Arkansas, but the Bulldogs were unable to qualify for a bowl game after a beat-down by bitter in-state rival Ole Miss. Lee finished the season with 1,519 yards passing yards, 7 passing touchdowns, 1 rushing touchdown, with 5 interceptions.

Lee was again the starting quarterback for the Bulldogs in 2009, now under head coach Dan Mullen. Highlights in 2009 included road wins over Vanderbilt, in which Lee scored a game-winning rushing touchdown in the fourth quarter, and Kentucky

After Mississippi State, Lee worked as a scout in the St. Louis Rams organization, but left to work with the Fellowship of Christian Athletes at Mississippi State.
