= 2009 Southeastern Conference football season =

- League: NCAA Division I FBS
- Sport: football
- Duration: September 3, 2009 through January 7, 2010
- Teams: 12
- TV partner(s): CBS, ESPN, ESPN2, ESPNU, SEC Network, FSN, CSS

2010 NFL Draft
- Top draft pick: Eric Berry (Tennessee)
- Picked by: Kansas City Chiefs, 5th overall

Regular season
- East champions: Florida Gators
- West champions: Alabama Crimson Tide

SEC Championship Game
- Champions: Alabama Crimson Tide
- Finals MVP: Mark Ingram, Alabama

Football seasons
- ← 2008 2010 →

2009 Southeastern Conference football standings
	Conf.			Overall
Team	W		L	W		L
Eastern Division
No. 3 Florida x%	8	–	0	13	–	1
Georgia	4	–	4	8	–	5
Tennessee	4	–	4	7	–	6
Kentucky	3	–	5	7	–	6
South Carolina	3	–	5	7	–	6
Vanderbilt	0	–	8	2	–	10
Western Division
No. 1 Alabama x$#	8	–	0	14	–	0
No. 17 LSU	5	–	3	9	–	4
No. 20 Ole Miss	4	–	4	9	–	4
Arkansas	3	–	5	8	–	5
Auburn	3	–	5	8	–	5
Mississippi State	3	–	5	5	–	7
Championship: Alabama 32, Florida 13
# – BCS National Champion; $ – BCS representative as conference champion; % – BCS at-large representative; x – Division champion/co-champions; Rankings from AP Poll

The 2009 Southeastern Conference football season started on Thursday, September 3 as conference member South Carolina visited North Carolina State. The conference's other 11 teams began their respective 2009 season of NCAA Division I FBS (Football Bowl Subdivision) competition on Saturday, September 5. All teams started their season at home except Kentucky, who started their season on neutral turf at Paul Brown Stadium in Cincinnati, Ohio against Miami (OH), Georgia, who traveled to Oklahoma State, and Alabama, who traveled to the Georgia Dome to face Virginia Tech in the Chick-fil-A College Kickoff for the second straight year.

== Bowl games ==
The SEC was the second conference to send 10 teams to bowl games in a given year. The ACC was the first to do so in 2008.

SEC Bowl Games
Game	Date	Location/Time*	Television	Winner^{+}	Score	Loser^{+}	Score	Attendance	Payout
Gaylord Hotels Music City Bowl	December 27, 2009	LP Field; Nashville, Tennessee; 7:30 p.m.	ESPN	Clemson	21	Kentucky	13	37,209	$1,700,000
AdvoCare V100 Independence Bowl	December 28, 2009	Independence Stadium; Shreveport, Louisiana; 4:00 p.m.	ESPN2	Georgia	44	Texas A&M	20	49,653	$2,200,000
Chick-fil-A Bowl	December 31, 2009	Georgia Dome; Atlanta, Georgia; 6:30 p.m.	ESPN	Virginia Tech	37	Tennessee	14	73,777	$3,010,000
Outback Bowl	January 1, 2010	Raymond James Stadium; Tampa, Florida; 10:00 a.m.	ESPN	Auburn	38	Northwestern	35	49,383	$3,300,000
Capital One Bowl	January 1, 2010	Florida Citrus Bowl; Orlando, Florida; 12:00 p.m.	ABC	Penn State* (#11)	19	LSU (#13)	17	63,025	$4,250,000
Allstate Sugar Bowl	January 1, 2010	Louisiana Superdome; New Orleans, Louisiana; 7:30 p.m.	FOX	Florida (#5)	51	Cincinnati (#4)	24	65,207	$18,000,000
PapaJohns.com Bowl	January 2, 2010	Legion Field; Birmingham, Alabama; 1:00 p.m.	ESPN	UConn	20	South Carolina	7	45,254	$900,000
AT&T Cotton Bowl Classic	January 2, 2010	Cowboys Stadium; Arlington, Texas; 1:00 p.m.	FOX	Ole Miss	21	Oklahoma State (#21)	7	77,928	$6,750,000
AutoZone Liberty Bowl	January 2, 2010	Liberty Bowl Memorial Stadium; Memphis, Tennessee; 4:30 p.m.	ESPN	Arkansas	20	East Carolina	17	62,742	$1,700,00
Citi BCS National Championship Game	January 7, 2010	Rose Bowl; Pasadena, California; 7:00 p.m.	ABC	Alabama (#1)	37	Texas (#2)	21	94,906	$31,000,000 (est.)

Rankings are from AP Poll. All times Central Standard Time.
* Penn State's win was vacated due to the Penn State child sex abuse scandal

== Awards and All-SEC Teams ==
2009 AP All-SEC First Team

Offense

Position	Name	Height	Weight (lbs.)	Class	Hometown	Team
QB	Tim Tebow	6'4"	240	Sr.	Jacksonville, FL, U.S.	Florida
RB	Mark Ingram II	5'10"	215	So.	Flint, MI, U.S.	Alabama
RB	Anthony Dixon	6'1"	235	Sr.	Jackson, MS, U.S.	Mississippi State
WR	A. J. Green	6'4"	205	So.	Summerville, SC, U.S.	Georgia
WR	Shay Hodge	6'2"	205	Sr.	Morton, MS, U.S.	Ole Miss
TE	Aaron Hernandez	6'2"	250	Sr.	Bristol, CT, U.S.	Florida
LT	Ciron Black	6'5"	322	Sr.	Tyler, TX, U.S.	LSU
LG	Mike Pouncey	6'5"	320	Jr.	Lakeland, FL, U.S.	Florida
C	Maurkice Pouncey	6'5"	320	Jr.	Lakeland, FL, U.S.	Florida
RG	Mike Johnson	6'6"	305	Sr.	Pensacola, FL, U.S.	Alabama
RT	John Jerry	6'6"	335	Sr.	Batesville, MS, U.S.	Ole Miss
All-purpose	Randall Cobb	5'11"	190	So.	Alcoa, TN, U.S.	Kentucky
All-purpose	Dexter McCluster	5'9"	170	Sr.	Largo, FL, U.S.	Ole Miss

Defense

Position	Name	Height	Weight (lbs.)	Class	Hometown	Team
DE	Antonio Coleman	6'3"	257	Sr.	Mobile, AL, U.S.	Auburn
DT	Terrence Cody	6'5"	350	Sr.	Fort Myers, FL, U.S.	Alabama
DT	Dan Williams	6'3"	325	Sr.	Memphis, TN, U.S.	Tennessee
DE	Carlos Dunlap	6'6"	290	Jr.	North Charleston, SC, U.S.	Florida
LB	Rolando McClain	6'4"	255	Jr.	Decatur, AL, U.S.	Alabama
LB	Eric Norwood	6'1"	250	Sr.	Acworth, GA, U.S.	South Carolina
LB	Rennie Curran	5'11"	220	Jr.	Atlanta, GA, U.S.	Georgia
DB	Javier Arenas	5'11"	200	Sr.	Tampa, FL, U.S.	Alabama
DB	Joe Haden	5'11"	185	Jr.	Fort Washington, MD, U.S.	Florida
S	Eric Berry	5'11"	200	Jr.	Fairburn, GA, U.S.	Tennessee
S	Mark Barron	6'2"	215	So.	Mobile, AL, U.S.	Alabama

== Rankings ==
Legend
	Improvement in ranking
	Drop in ranking
	Not ranked previous week
RV	Received votes but were not ranked in Top 25 of poll

		Pre	Wk 1	Wk 2	Wk 3	Wk 4	Wk 5	Wk 6	Wk 7	Wk 8	Wk 9	Wk 10	Wk 11	Wk 12	Wk 13	Wk 14	Final
Alabama	AP	5	4	4	3	3	3	2	1	2	3	3	2	2	2	1	1
Alabama	C	5	4	4	3	3	3	3	2	2	3	3	3	3	3	1	1
Alabama	BCS	Not released							2	2	3	2	2	2	2	2	
Arkansas	AP	RV	RV	RV	RV			RV	RV								
Arkansas	C	RV	RV	RV	RV		RV	RV	RV								
Arkansas	BCS	Not released															
Auburn	AP	RV	RV	RV	RV	RV	17	RV	RV								
Auburn	C	RV	RV	RV	RV	RV	19	RV	RV	RV							
Auburn	BCS	Not released															
Florida	AP	1	1	1	1	1	1	1	2	1	1	1	1	1			
Florida	C	1	1	1	1	1	1	1	1	1	1	1	1	1			
Florida	BCS	Not released							1	1	1	1	1	1			
Georgia	AP	13	21	23	21	18	RV										
Georgia	C	13	21	20	17	14	RV		RV	RV							
Georgia	BCS	Not released															
Kentucky	AP																
Kentucky	C	RV	RV	RV	RV												
Kentucky	BCS	Not released															
LSU	AP	11	11	9	7	4	4	10	9	9							
LSU	C	9	9	7	7	4	4	10	10	9							
LSU	BCS	Not released							9	9							
Mississippi State	AP																
Mississippi State	C																
Mississippi State	BCS	Not released															
Ole Miss	AP	8	6	5	4	21	20	RV	RV	24							
Ole Miss	C	10	8	6	5	18	16	RV	25	22							
Ole Miss	BCS	Not released								25							
South Carolina	AP	RV	RV	RV	RV	RV	25	22	23	21							
South Carolina	C	RV	RV	RV	RV	RV	RV	22	23	21							
South Carolina	BCS	Not released							24	22							
Tennessee	AP	RV	RV														
Tennessee	C	RV	RV														
Tennessee	BCS	Not released															
Vanderbilt	AP																
Vanderbilt	C																
Vanderbilt	BCS	Not released															

== SEC vs. BCS matchups ==
Date	Visitor	Home	Winner
September 3	South Carolina	NC State	South Carolina
September 5	Georgia	Oklahoma State	Oklahoma State
September 5	Alabama	Virginia Tech	Alabama
September 5	LSU	Washington	LSU
September 12	UCLA	Tennessee	UCLA
September 19	Louisville	Kentucky	Kentucky
September 19	West Virginia	Auburn	Auburn
September 26	Arizona State	Georgia	Georgia
October 3	Arkansas	Texas A&M	Arkansas
October 3	Georgia Tech	Mississippi State	Georgia Tech
October 31	Georgia Tech	Vanderbilt	Georgia Tech
November 28	Florida State	Florida	Florida
November 28	Clemson	South Carolina	South Carolina
November 28	Georgia	Georgia Tech	Georgia

== Previous season ==
During the 2008 NCAA Division I FBS football season, Florida and Alabama won their respective divisions and met in the 2008 SEC Championship Game which Florida won 31–20. Florida went on to win the 2009 BCS National Championship while SEC Runner-Up Alabama lost in the Sugar Bowl. Georgia was the heavy favorite to win the SEC in the pre-season, but did not live up to the hype. The Bulldogs, however, did finish strong winning the Capital One Bowl. Other bowl winners include Chick-fil-A Bowl champion LSU, Cotton Bowl Classic champion Ole Miss, Liberty Bowl champion Kentucky, Music City Bowl champion Vanderbilt

== Preseason ==
Tennessee head coach Lane Kiffin begins his first season in Knoxville. Kiffin is a former head coach of the Oakland Raiders and assistant coach at USC. Gene Chizik also begins his first season as head coach at Auburn.

In a given year, each SEC team will play its five other division foes plus three opposing division opponents. Each team has a set opposing division opponent. The other teams from the division are on a rotation, playing a home/away series every five seasons.

Western Division	Eastern Division	Series record
Auburn	Georgia	53-51-8
Alabama	Tennessee	46-38-7
Ole Miss	Vanderbilt	46-35-2
LSU	Florida	23-30-3
Mississippi State	Kentucky	16-20
Arkansas	South Carolina	10-7

The Southeastern Conference announced on July 22 that the SEC media had elected Florida and Alabama as the preseason favorites for their divisions for the 2009 football season. It chose Florida quarterback Tim Tebow as the Preseason Offensive Player of the Year and Tennessee cornerback Eric Berry as the Preseason Defensive Player of the Year.

In the preseason Coaches' Poll released on August 7, the SEC was one of only three conferences with multiple teams ranked in the top ten. Florida was elected pre-season #1 while Alabama, LSU, Ole Miss, and Georgia also were in the top 25.
