= 2009 Arkansas Razorbacks football team =

American college football season

2009 Arkansas Razorbacks football

Liberty Bowl champion

Liberty Bowl, W 20–17 ^{OT} vs. East Carolina
- Conference: Southeastern Conference
- Western Division
- Record: 8–5 (3–5 SEC)
- Head coach: Bobby Petrino (2nd season)
- Offensive coordinator: Paul Petrino (2nd season)
- Offensive scheme: Multiple
- Defensive coordinator: Willy Robinson (2nd season)
- Base defense: 4–3
- Captains: Adrian Davis; Wendel Davis; DeMarcus Love; Ryan Mallett; Malcolm Sheppard; Michael Smith
- Home stadium: Donald W. Reynolds Razorback Stadium; War Memorial Stadium

2009 Southeastern Conference football standings
	Conf.			Overall
Team	W		L	W		L
Eastern Division
No. 3 Florida x%	8	–	0	13	–	1
Georgia	4	–	4	8	–	5
Tennessee	4	–	4	7	–	6
Kentucky	3	–	5	7	–	6
South Carolina	3	–	5	7	–	6
Vanderbilt	0	–	8	2	–	10
Western Division
No. 1 Alabama x$#	8	–	0	14	–	0
No. 17 LSU	5	–	3	9	–	4
No. 20 Ole Miss	4	–	4	9	–	4
Arkansas	3	–	5	8	–	5
Auburn	3	–	5	8	–	5
Mississippi State	3	–	5	5	–	7
Championship: Alabama 32, Florida 13
# – BCS National Champion; $ – BCS representative as conference champion; % – BCS at-large representative; x – Division champion/co-champions; Rankings from AP Poll

The 2009 Arkansas Razorbacks football team represented the University of Arkansas as a member of the Southeastern Conference (SEC) during the 2009 NCAA Division I FBS football season. Led by second-year head coach Bobby Petrino, the Razorbacks compiled an overall record of 8–5 with a mark of 3–5 in conference play, placing a three-way tie for fourth at the bottom of the standings in the SEC's Western Division. Arkansas was invited to the Liberty Bowl, where the Razorbacks defeated East Carolina in overtime. The team played five home games at Donald W. Reynolds Razorback Stadium in Fayetteville, Arkansas and two home games at War Memorial Stadium in Little Rock, Arkansas.

== Schedule ==
Date	Time	Opponent	Site	TV	Result	Attendance	Source
September 5	6:00 pm	Missouri State*	War Memorial Stadium; Little Rock, AR	PPV	W 48–10	55,572	
September 19	7:45 pm	No. 23 Georgia	Donald W. Reynolds Razorback Stadium; Fayetteville, AR	ESPN	L 41–52	74,210	
September 26	2:30 pm	at No. 3 Alabama	Bryant–Denny Stadium; Tuscaloosa, AL	CBS	L 7–35	92,012	
October 3	6:30 pm	vs. Texas A&M*	Cowboys Stadium; Arlington, TX (Southwest Classic)	ESPN2	W 47–19	71,872	
October 10	11:00 am	No. 17 Auburn	Donald W. Reynolds Razorback Stadium; Fayetteville, AR	ESPN	W 44–23	72,559	
October 17	2:30 pm	at No. 1 Florida	Ben Hill Griffin Stadium; Gainesville, FL	CBS	L 20–23	90,508	
October 24	11:21 am	at Ole Miss	Vaught–Hemingway Stadium; Oxford, MS (rivalry)	SECN	L 17–30	60,622	
October 31	6:00 pm	Eastern Michigan*^{†}	Donald W. Reynolds Razorback Stadium; Fayetteville, AR	ESPNU	W 63–27	62,501	
November 7	11:21 am	South Carolina	Donald W. Reynolds Razorback Stadium; Fayetteville, AR	SECN	W 33–16	68,865	
November 14	6:30 pm	Troy*	Donald W. Reynolds Razorback Stadium; Fayetteville, AR	CSS	W 56–20	66,442	
November 21	11:21 am	Mississippi State	War Memorial Stadium; Little Rock, AR	SECN	W 42–21	55,634	
November 28	6:00 pm	at No. 17 LSU	Tiger Stadium; Baton Rouge, LA (rivalry)	ESPN	L 30–33 ^{OT}	93,013	
January 2	5:30 pm	vs. East Carolina*	Liberty Bowl Memorial Stadium; Memphis, TN (Liberty Bowl)	ESPN	W 20–17 ^{OT}	62,742	
*Non-conference game; ^{†}Homecoming; Rankings from AP Poll released prior to the game; All times are in Central time

== Before the season ==
=== Additions ===
Punter Briton Forester signed with the team on March 2 out of Palomar College. Forester had previously competed at Hawaii in 2006 and 2007, and will be designated a junior at Arkansas. New special teams coach John L. Smith was integral in Forester's signing.

USC transfer Broderick Green was cleared to play by the NCAA on July 31, 2009. The running back transferred to Arkansas to be nearer his ill grandmother, who resides in Little Rock, Arkansas. He will have three years of eligibility remaining.

=== Departures ===
In a press release on December 16, 2008, Nathan Dick, brother of Casey Dick, announced his intentions to transfer from the University of Arkansas. His release was granted by Bobby Petrino. Dick transferred to in-state UCA. Crosby Tuck, a sophomore receiver from Shiloh Christian School, announced on February 23, 2009 that he would no longer play for the Razorbacks. The Springdale native's decision was based on an elbow injury against Kentucky in 2007, from which he has not returned. Tuck will remain at the University of Arkansas.

Sophomore linebacker Khiry Battle was dismissed from the team on June 29, 2009, due to an unspecified violation of team rules.

== Game summaries ==
=== Missouri State ===
	1	2	3	4	Total
Bears	7	3	0	0	10
Razorbacks	21	10	10	7	48

Arkansas began the season with a bang as Dennis Johnson returned the opening kickoff 91 yards for a touchdown. The Razorbacks also threw for over 400 yards as a team for the first time in school history.

Ryan Mallett went 17 for 22 passing for 309 yards and a touchdown in his Razorbacks debut. He transferred from the University of Michigan following the 2007 season, and had to sit out the 2008 season in accordance with NCAA regulations. His backup, Tyler Wilson, was more efficient but less productive going 13 for 19 for 138 yards with an interception and two touchdowns. Senior running back Michael Smith scored from 15 yards out to make the score 14–0 Razorbacks. Broderick Green scored on a 1-yard touchdown plunge to make the score 21–3 to close the first quarter.

Van Stumon caught a Wilson pass for a two-yard touchdown, followed by a Bears score to push the Razorback advantage to 28–10. Alex Tejada added a short field goal before halftime to give the Hogs a 21-point lead. Joe Adams caught a 40-yard touchdown pass from Mallett to start the third quarter scoring, with the Hogs also notching another Tejada field goal. The fourth quarter produced another TD strike from Wilson, this time to Cobi Hamilton.

Smith finished with four carries for 43 yards and the score. True freshman Ronnie Wingo Jr. rushed eight times for 50 yards, Broderick Green rushed 10 times for 31 yards and a touchdown. Jarius Wright caught 6 passes for 139 yards, with Joe Adams snagging 4 for 70 and a TD. Cobi Hamilton had four grabs for 56 and a TD, Greg Childs caught 4 for 50 yds. Tight end D.J. Williams, named to the Mackey Award watch list, caught two passes for twenty yards. Razorback linebackers Wendel Davis and Jerry Franklin had five solo tackles each.

=== Georgia ===
	1	2	3	4	Total
#20 Bulldogs	10	17	15	10	52
Razorbacks	21	0	17	3	41

The fifth-largest crowd in Razorback Stadium history watched the Hogs and Dogs pile up over 1,000 yards of offense and numerous school records. Georgia QB Joe Cox threw for 375 yards and five scores. Bulldogs receiver A. J. Green had seven catches for 137 yards and two scores. Ryan Mallett of Arkansas completed 21 of 39 for 408 yards and five touchdowns. The yardage and touchdown totals both are school records. Razorback receiver Greg Childs caught five passes for 140 yards and two TDs.

Arkansas scored on their first two plays; Joe Adams catching an 18-yard pass from Ryan Mallett (Alex Tejada kick) followed by a Jarius Wright 48-yard pass from Mallett. Georgia scored on a Joe Cox TD pass and Blair Walsh field goal, followed by a Greg Childs 30-yard touchdown reception from Ryan Mallett to make it a 21–10 Razorback lead to end the first period. Early in the second quarter, Razorback linebacker Jerry Franklin was assessed two unsportsmanlike conduct penalties and was ejected. Georgia opened the second quarter scoring with an 80-yard run by Richard Samuel, followed by a 25-yard pass from Joe Cox to A.J. Green. Walsh added a field goal as time expired, giving UGA the first half, 27–21.

Arkansas forced Georgia into a three-and-out, followed by a 40-yard Ryan Mallett aerial to Greg Childs, to make it a 28–27 Arkansas advantage. Tavarres King of Georgia responded by catching a 50-yard pass from Cox. Arkansas replied when D.J. Williams snagged a 2-yard pass from Mallett. Georgia two-way player Orson Charles caught a 44-yard pass from Joe Cox to make the score 40–35. The Dogs attempted a two-point conversion, and A.J. Green caught the lob from Cox to make it 42–35. Razorback kicker Alex Tejada added a short field goal, making the score 42–38 to Georgia's advantage.

A.J. Green caught a 28-yard touchdown pass from Cox to give UGA an 11-point lead in the fourth quarter. The Razorbacks drove inside the Georgia 10-yard line, but settled for a field goal. Georgia subsequently took the ball and tacked on another field goal, making the final score 52–41.

The three-hour and forty-five-minute affair contained 25 penalties for 193 total yards. The two teams combined to run 125 plays. Joe Cox was named National Offensive Player of the Week by the Walter Camp Football Foundation for his efforts.

=== Alabama ===
	1	2	3	4	Total
Razorbacks	0	0	7	0	7
#3 Crimson Tide	0	14	14	7	35

Arkansas visited Bryant–Denny Stadium on September 26 to play the third-ranked Alabama Crimson Tide.

Arkansas and Alabama battled to a 0–0 tie after the first quarter, with the two teams combining for five punts and six first downs. Trent Richardson got the scoring started for 'Bama, breaking numerous tackles on his way to a 52-yard touchdown run. After Arkansas punted on the ensuing possession, Alabama quarterback Greg McElroy completed a deep pass to Julio Jones for 50 yards and a touchdown out of the wildcat formation. Arkansas rushed for negative yardage in the second quarter, but was losing by only 14 at halftime.

Arkansas' offense got started in the third quarter on a Greg Childs 18-yard touchdown reception from Ryan Mallett. The Alex Tejada kick made it a 14–7 Alabama lead. Alabama's response was a single play: McElroy to Marquis Maze for an 80-yard touchdown pass. Arkansas' Dylan Breeding had his punt attempt blocked, setting up Mark Ingram to catch a 14-yard TD pass from McElroy. The Crimson Tide led 28–7 entering the fourth quarter, and Ingram's 2-yard run produced the 35–7 final score.

=== Texas A&M ===
	1	2	3	4	Total
Aggies	10	0	3	6	19
Razorbacks	7	23	7	10	47

Texas A&M and Arkansas renewed their rivalry at Cowboys Stadium on October 3. Texas A&M took an early 10–0 lead on a Randy Bullock field goal and Jerrod Johnson 60-yard pass to Bran Jackson, but Arkansas responded with 30 unanswered points before halftime. TD passes from Ryan Mallett to Broderick Green and DeAnthony Curtis, followed by an 85-yard fumble return for a touchdown by Jerry Franklin, gave the Hogs a 21–10 lead. Alex Tejada made a field goal and Jarius Wright's 31-yard touchdown reception gave the Razorbacks a 30–10 lead at halftime.

The Aggies replied with a field goal from Bullock with 8:16 to play in the third quarter. Mallett hit Michael Smith for a 29-yard passing touchdown to close the third quarter scoring. Texas A&M receiver Ryan Tannehill caught a 3-yard pass from Johnson to make it a 19–37 game, but the Aggies failed the two-point conversion. After another Tejada field goal, Razorback true freshman Ronnie Wingo, Jr. broke loose for a 62-yard touchdown to produce the final margin of 47–19.

Texas A&M quarterback Jerrod Johnson completed 30 of 58 passes for 345 yards and two touchdowns. Ryan Mallett was 17 of 27 passing for 271 yards, four touchdowns and an interception. Joe Adams caught three passes for 110 yards to lead Arkansas in receiving. The contest took three hours and twenty six minutes to complete, and contained 151 plays, 91 of which were run by Texas A&M.

=== Auburn ===
	1	2	3	4	Total
#17 Tigers	0	3	20	0	23
Razorbacks	6	21	7	10	44

Former Auburn coach Tommy Tuberville provided his insight on the contest, stating over the radio on WJOX, "Arkansas can’t stop a cold, but they’ll try to score some points" and that Auburn would win "by three touchdowns". Bobby Petrino was an offensive coordinator for the Tigers under Tuberville in 2002, and was considered as Tuberville's successor after a dismal 2003 campaign.

Arkansas forced a three-and-out on the game's opening drive, and scored on a Broderick Green 2-yard run to give the Hogs an early 7–0 lead. Early in the second quarter, Michael Smith broke a 25-yard touchdown run to give the Razorbacks a 13–0 edge. Tigers running back Mario Fannin fumbled the ensuing kickoff, recovered by Arkansas' Jerell Norton at the Auburn 34-yard line. Two plays later, Ryan Mallett completed a 16-yard touchdown pass to Greg Childs to stretch the lead to 20–0. Auburn's Wes Byrum hit on a 37-yard field goal before halftime, and Mallett completed a five-yard touchdown pass to D. J. Williams to make the Arkansas lead 27–3.

Arkansas punted to open the third quarter, but Jake Bequette's recovery of Ben Tate's fumble gave the Hogs the ball at the Arkansas 5-yard line. Ten plays later, Ryan Mallett rushed for a four-yard touchdown to make it 34–3 Hogs. Tate replied twice, first on a one-yard touchdown run, and later on a 60-yard touchdown scamper. Onterio McCalebb also scored on the ground for Auburn in the third quarter, cutting the Razorbacks' lead to 23–34. Broderick Green responded early in the fourth quarter on a 3-yard rushing score. Alex Tejada added a field goal to produce the final 44–23 margin. Arkansas won by 21 points, totally reversing Tommy Tuberville's prediction that the Tigers would prevail by three scores.

=== Florida ===
	1	2	3	4	Total
Razorbacks	0	10	3	7	20
#1 Gators	0	3	10	10	23

With Florida favored to win by 25 points, the Arkansas Razorbacks pushed the top-ranked Gators to the edge. Arkansas sacked 2007 Heisman Trophy winner Tim Tebow six times and forced four turnovers, but missed a 31-yard Alex Tejada field goal that would have given the Hogs a 23–20 lead with 3:08 to play.

Jake Bequette set up the game's first points be forcing a Tebow fumble, recovered by Zach Stadther. The Hogs drove to the one-yard line before the first quarter ended tied scoreless. USC transfer Broderick Green plunged into the end zone to start the second quarter, and gave the Hogs a 7–0 lead. Tebow fumbled again on his team's ensuing possession, but the Razorbacks could not capitalize. UF receiver Aaron Hernandez fumbled for the third straight Gator possession, but the Hogs were forced to punt. Florida's kicker, Caleb Sturgis, kicked a 30-yard field goal on Florida's next possession to make the game 7–3 in favor of Arkansas.

The Razorbacks drove inside the UF five-yard line before halftime, but could only get a field goal. This gave the Hogs a 10–3 lead at the break, despite missing on every third down conversion.

Following the half time performance, Florida connected on a 51-yard field goal from Sturgis to cut the Razorbacks' lead to 10–6. Tramain Thomas made an outstanding play on UF's Chris Rainey later in the third quarter. He attempted to tackle Rainey in the open field, but fell to the turf. While falling, Thomas kicked the ball cleanly out of Rainey's arm, and it fell right to Thomas. The Hogs took over at Florida's 28-yard line, but missed a short field goal and were forced walk away empty from the encounter.

On Florida's ensuing possession, Tim Tebow connected with Deonte Thompson for a 77-yard touchdown pass. Ramon Broadway was peeking into the backfield on the play, and took a false step towards the line of scrimmage. This allowed Thompson to give the Gators a 13–10 lead. Arkansas replied with a drive fueled mostly by the efforts of Dennis Johnson, who started at running back instead of an injured Michael Smith. The drive's deciding play, however, was when Ryan Mallett missed an open Van Stumon in the end zone. The Hogs did connect on another Tejada field goal, tying the game at 13.

Early in the fourth quarter, Mallett was forced to step up in the pocket and sling a pass to Greg Childs on 3rd and 17. Childs caught the ball and outran several UF defenders to the end zone. It appeared that Childs lost the ball on the one-yard line, but after review it was decided that he maintained possession on the 75-yard scoring play. Arkansas had a 20–13 lead with 9:40 to play.

Florida responded with a 67-yard scoring drive, assisted by a 15-yard pass interference penalty and 15-yard personal foul penalty called consecutively against Arkansas. The CBS broadcasting team said that the calls were both "questionable". Top-ranked Florida tied the game at 20. The officiating crew was suspended by the Southeastern Conference the following week, and remained on suspension until November 14. Florida coach Urban Meyer later said that the SEC was right by suspending the crew, and Bobby Petrino was reprimanded by the SEC for publicly criticizing the crew after the contest.

Ryan Mallett later led a 56-yard drive to the UF 21-yard line, but Alex Tejada missed a potential game-winning field goal with 3:08 remaining. Tebow and company marched down the field to the Arkansas 10-yard line, finding Riley Cooper for three first downs on the drive. With thirteen seconds to play, Sturgis kicked the game-winning field goal, ending the Razorbacks' upset bid and preserving Florida's homecoming.

=== Ole Miss ===
	1	2	3	4	Total
Razorbacks	0	7	10	0	17
Rebels	14	3	7	6	30

The Arkansas Razorbacks traveled to Oxford, Mississippi to match up against former coach Houston Nutt.

Jevan Snead opened the scoring for the Ole Miss Rebels, running in from one yard out. The University of Texas transfer also completed a 25-yard touchdown pass to Shay Hodge to take a 14–0 Rebels lead. Ole Miss added a field goal from Joshua Shene before Arkansas scored. Knile Davis rumbled in from three yards out to draw the Razorbacks within 10. Before halftime, Snead lead what looked like a last-minute scoring drive until Arkansas defensive back Jerico Nelson intercepted a pass at the Arkansas six-yard line.

Andru Stewart intercepted another Snead pass early in the third quarter, leading to an Alex Tejada field goal. Ole Miss responded when Snead hit Dexter McCluster on a screen pass that McCluster took for a 64-yard touchdown. Arkansas scored on the ensuing possession when Ryan Mallett connected with Carlton Salters for a 58-yard touchdown. The ball was intended for Greg Childs, but Childs and two Rebel defenders tipped the ball to an uncovered Salters for the score. The Rebels added two more Shene field goals to make the final score 30–17. McCluster rushed 22 times for 123 yards. He also caught 7 passes for 137 yards and a touchdown.

=== Eastern Michigan ===
	1	2	3	4	Total
Eagles	0	0	20	7	27
Razorbacks	21	21	21	0	63

The Eastern Michigan Eagles came to Fayetteville on Halloween to play the Razorbacks on homecoming. Prior to the game, EMU was the top-ranked defense against the pass, but last against the run. The Hogs were without Michael Smith, who had a hamstring injury, but regained the services of WR Joe Adams.

Arkansas scored on its first drive when running back Knile Davis took the ball in from six yards out. The Hogs also scored on their next possession, a Broderick Green run over right guard for a touchdown. On the ensuing possession, EMU quarterback Kyle McMahon was intercepted by Freddie Burton, who returned the ball 50 yards for a touchdown. Early in the second quarter, Ryan Mallett found Joe Adams on a ten-yard crossing pattern for a score. Following a missed Alex Tejada field goal, Patrick Treppa punted for EMU, leaving the Razorbacks with the ball on their own one-yard line. However, on the next play, Broderick Green broke through the line and rumbled 99 yards for a touchdown. The score was the longest play in Arkansas Razorbacks history, longer than the previous record of 90 yards set by Billy Moore against Tulsa back in 1962. Following another EMU punt, Mallet found Adams for a 78-yard touchdown pass, giving the Hogs a 42–0 lead as the teams went to halftime. The Razorback defense did not allow EMU a single first down in the first half.

Following the homecoming halftime festivities, Seth Armbrust blocked an Eastern Michigan punt, and scooped it up for a touchdown. At this point, Kyle McMahon began to move the Eagles, scoring on their next two possessions, including a TD pass to Kinsman Thomas for 77 yards. Mallett responded with a 55-yard bomb to Cobi Hamilton, and Davis capped the drive two plays later to make it a 56–13 game. After another EMU score, Mallett found Lucas Miller for a sixteen-yard score. EMU tacked on another score, but the Razorbacks prevailed in a 63–27 rout.

Mallett finished completing 14 of 16 passes for 249 yards and three touchdowns. Broderick Green had 135 yards on nine rushes, including the 99-yard record-setting score. Joe Adams had 109 yards receiving in his first game after suffering a mild stroke.

== Personnel ==
=== Coaching staff ===
2009 Arkansas Razorbacks coaching staff
Head coaches: Head Coach - Bobby Petrino; Offensive coaches: Offensive coordinator – Paul Petrino; Quarterbacks - Garrick McGee; Running backs - Tim Horton; Tight ends – Tim Horton; Offensive line – Mike Summers; Graduate assistant - Chip Long; Defensive coaches: Defensive coordinator – Willy Robinson; Linebackers – Reggie Johnson; Defensive tackle - Bobby Allen; Defensive ends – Kirk Botkin; Secondary - Willy Robinson; Graduate assistant - Courtney Sanders	Special teams: Special Teams Coordinator - John L. Smith; Administrative staff: Athletic Director (AD) - Jeff Long; Director of High School Relations - Dean Campbell; Director of football operations - Mark Robinson; Strength and conditioning – Jason Veltkamp; Recruiting Coordinator - Tim Horton

=== Roster ===
2009 Arkansas Razorbacks roster
Post-Spring Roster from the University of Arkansas Razorbacks Athletics
Quarterbacks: 8 Tyler Wilson - (redshirt) Freshman; 10 Nick Petrino - Sophomore; 14 Jim Youngblood - (redshirt) Freshman; 15 Ryan Mallett - (redshirt) Sophomore; 17 Brandon Mitchell - Freshman; -- Derek Hatcher - Freshman; Tailbacks: 6 Brandon Barnett - Senior; 7 Knile Davis - Freshman; 20 Ronnie Wingo, Jr. - Freshman; 21 Michael Smith - (redshirt) Senior; 23 De'Anthony Curtis - Sophomore; 29 Broderick Green - Sophomore; 33 Dennis Johnson - Sophomore; 35 Ronald Watkins - (redshirt) Freshman; -- Garry Grace - Freshman; Fullbacks: 30 Mitchell Bailey - Sophomore; 44 Van Stumon - (redshirt) Junior; 48 John Durmon - Senior; Wide receivers: 1 Reggie Fish - (redshirt) Senior; 2 London Crawford - Senior; 3 Joe Adams - Sophomore; 4 Jarius Wright - Sophomore; 6 Bobby Petrino - Freshman; 11 Cobi Hamilton - Freshman; 19 Carlton Salters - (redshirt) Junior; 28 Alvin Chambers - Freshman; 83 Neal Barlow - Freshman; 85 Greg Childs - Sophomore; 80 Chris Gragg - Sophomore; 81 Marques Wade - (redshirt) Junior; 82 Lance Ray - Freshman; 84 Price Holmes - Freshman; 88 Lucas Miller - (redshirt) Senior; 89 Austin Tucker - (redshirt) Sophomore; -- Chris Muncie - Freshman; -- Brandon Pyle - Freshman; -- Telvin Griffin - Freshman; -- William Serrano - Freshman	Tight ends: 40 Joseph Henry - (redshirt) Senior; 42 Kevin Glover - (redshirt) Junior; 90 Colton Nash - Freshman; 87 Austin Tate - Freshman; 45 D.J. Williams - Junior; Offensive line: 54 Colby Berna - Freshman; 57 Robby Campbell - Freshman; 64 Travis Swanson - Freshman; 67 Alvin Bailey - Freshman; 69 David Hurd OL - Freshman; 78 Anthony Oden - Freshman; 70 Zhamal Thomas - Junior; -- Blake Gunderson - Freshman; -- Jordan Jacobs - Freshman; Offensive tackles: 65 DeMarcus Love - (redshirt) Junior; 73 Ray Dominguez - (redshirt) Junior; 75 Matt Hall - (redshirt) Freshman; 76 Tyler Deacon - (redshirt) Freshman; 79 Grant Freeman - (redshirt) Sophomore; Offensive guards: 66 Mitch Petrus - (redshirt) Senior; 72 Grant Cook - (redshirt) Sophomore; 74 Kareem Crowell - (redshirt) Sophomore; Centers: 60 Seth Oxner - (redshirt) Sophomore; 68 Clay Bemberg - (redshirt) Junior; 71 Wade Grayson - Junior; Defensive ends: 18 Adrian Davis - Senior; 43 Tenarius Wright - (redshirt) Freshman; 58 Damario Ambrose - Junior; 63 Adam Pearce - (redshirt) Freshman; 91 Jake Bequette - (redshirt) Sophomore; 93 Chris Berezansky - (redshirt) Senior; 98 Caleb Evans - Junior	Defensive tackles: 92 DeQuinta Jones - Freshman; 95 Patrick Jones - Junior; 96 Malcolm Sheppard - Senior; 97 Ryan Calender - Freshman; 99 Lavunce Askew - Sophomore; Nose tackles: 51 Alfred Davis - (redshirt) Freshman; 61 Zach Stadther - Sophomore; Linebackers: 10 Wendel Davis - Senior; 25 Terrell Williams - Freshman; 34 Jerry Franklin - (redshirt) Junior; 41 Ryan Powers - (redshirt) Junior; 46 Freddy Burton - Junior; 50 Stephen Barnett - (redshirt) Junior; 52 Robert Salinas - Senior; 53 Jermaine Love - Junior; 54 Michael Villegas - Freshman; 55 Austin Moss - Freshman; 45 AJ Nelson - (redshirt) Freshman; Cornerbacks: 5 Tramain Thomas - Sophomore; 24 Isaac Madison - Junior; 26 Ramon Broadway - (redshirt) Junior; 28 Greg Gatson - Sophomore; 29 Daniel Baldwin - Freshman; 30 Thomas Moss - Sophomore; 36 Andru Stewart - Junior; -- Devrick Perkins - Freshman; -- Justin Wortman - Freshman	Defensive backs: 1 Anthony Leon - Junior; 4 Rudell Crim - Junior; 9 Elton Ford - Sophomore; 13 Seth Armbrust - (redshirt) Junior; 16 Darius Winston - Freshman; 19 Dustin Cain - Junior; 22 David Gordon - Freshman; 27 Jerell Norton - (redshirt) Junior; 31 Jerico Nelson - Sophomore; 32 Bret Harris - (redshirt) Sophomore; 35 Ross Rasner - Freshman; 38 Jerry Mitchell - Freshman; 39 Matt Harris - (redshirt) Senior; 47 Matt Marshall - (redshirt) Freshman; Punters: 14 Dylan Breeding - Freshman; 49 Briton Forester - Junior; Kickers: 2 Alex Tejada - Junior; 37 Cameron Bryan - (redshirt) Freshman; -- Cameron Craig - Freshman; -- Brandon Tierney - Freshman; 36 Dylan Zimmerman - Freshman; Long snappers: 50 Robby Cox - (redshirt) Freshman; 53 Derrell Hartwick - (redshirt) Sophomore; 59 Rhett Richardson - Junior; 62 Nick Brewer - Sophomore; 94 Will Coleman - Freshman; Terms: Freshman - A player in his first year.; Sophomore - A player in his second year.; Junior - A player in his third year.; Senior - A player in his fourth year.; Redshirt - A player who sat out a previous season.

=== Recruits ===
College recruiting
Name	Hometown	School	Height	Weight	40^{‡}	Commit date
Alvin Bailey; OL	Broken Arrow, OK	Broken Arrow HS	6 ft 5 in (1.96 m)	330 lb (150 kg)	5.3	Aug 14, 2008
Alvin Bailey; OL	Recruit ratings: Scout: Rivals: (76)					
Neal Barlow; WR	Little Rock, AR	Pulaski Academy	6 ft 6 in (1.98 m)	185 lb (84 kg)	4.55	Sep 18, 2008
Neal Barlow; WR	Recruit ratings: Scout: Rivals: (75)					
Colby Berna; OL	Fayetteville, AR	Fayetteville HS	6 ft 4 in (1.93 m)	275 lb (125 kg)	5.1	Feb 6, 2008
Colby Berna; OL	Recruit ratings: Scout: Rivals: (80)					
Shauntez Bruce; OL	Tallahassee, FL	Lincoln HS	6 ft 4.5 in (1.94 m)	295 lb (134 kg)	N/A	Jan 12, 2009
Shauntez Bruce; OL	Recruit ratings: Scout: Rivals: (76)					
Ryan Calender; DE	Caddo Mills, TX	Caddo Mills HS	6 ft 8 in (2.03 m)	220 lb (100 kg)	4.8	May 28, 2008
Ryan Calender; DE	Recruit ratings: Scout: Rivals: (74)					
Rudell Crim; DB	Tallahassee, FL	Butler County (KS)	6 ft 0 in (1.83 m)	190 lb (86 kg)	4.4	Jan 20, 2009
Rudell Crim; DB	Recruit ratings: Scout: Rivals:					
Knile Davis; RB	Missouri City, TX	Marshall HS	6 ft 1.5 in (1.87 m)	209.5 lb (95.0 kg)	4.48	Jan 9, 2009
Knile Davis; RB	Recruit ratings: Scout: Rivals: (80)					
David Gordon; DB	Tulsa, OK	East Central HS	6 ft 0 in (1.83 m)	170 lb (77 kg)	4.4	Jul 18, 2008
David Gordon; DB	Recruit ratings: Scout: Rivals: (80)					
Cobi Hamilton; WR	Texarkana, TX	Texas HS	6 ft 3 in (1.91 m)	194 lb (88 kg)	4.56	Jan 27, 2009
Cobi Hamilton; WR	Recruit ratings: Scout: Rivals: (78)					
John Henderson; DT	Oakland, CA	College of the Sequoias	6 ft .5 in (1.84 m)	305 lb (138 kg)	4.95	Feb 2, 2009
John Henderson; DT	Recruit ratings: Scout: Rivals:					
Rickey Hughey; ATH	Lewisville, AR	Lafayette County HS	6 ft 5 in (1.96 m)	221 lb (100 kg)	4.7	Oct 14, 2008
Rickey Hughey; ATH	Recruit ratings: Scout: Rivals: (40)					
DeQuinta Jones; DT	Bastrop, LA	Bastrop HS	6 ft 4.5 in (1.94 m)	305 lb (138 kg)	4.70	Feb 4, 2009
DeQuinta Jones; DT	Recruit ratings: Scout: Rivals: (77)					
Anthony Leon; DB	Miami, FL	College of the Sequoias	6 ft 3.5 in (1.92 m)	230 lb (100 kg)	4.55	Jan 23, 2009
Anthony Leon; DB	Recruit ratings: Scout: Rivals:					
Kevin Lowery; DT	Gainesville, FL	Gainesville HS	6 ft 3 in (1.91 m)	285 lb (129 kg)	5.1	Oct 15, 2008
Kevin Lowery; DT	Recruit ratings: Scout: Rivals: (78)					
Brandon Mitchell; ATH	Amite, LA	Amite HS	6 ft 4 in (1.93 m)	220 lb (100 kg)	4.5	Jan 14, 2009
Brandon Mitchell; ATH	Recruit ratings: Scout: Rivals: (76)					
Jerry Mitchell; DB	Mandeville, LA	Mandeville HS	6 ft 1.5 in (1.87 m)	197 lb (89 kg)	4.5	Sep 8, 2008
Jerry Mitchell; DB	Recruit ratings: Scout: Rivals: (77)					
Austin Moss; LB	Rockwall, TX	Rockwall-Heath HS	6 ft 2.5 in (1.89 m)	210 lb (95 kg)	4.57	Jul 31, 2008
Austin Moss; LB	Recruit ratings: Scout: Rivals: (77)					
Colton Nash; DE	Sulphur Springs, TX	Sulphur Springs HS	6 ft 7 in (2.01 m)	243 lb (110 kg)	4.8	Jan 25, 2009
Colton Nash; DE	Recruit ratings: Scout: Rivals: (75)					
Anthony Oden; OL	Chatham, VA	Hargrave Military Academy	6 ft 8 in (2.03 m)	314 lb (142 kg)	4.87	Aug 9, 2008
Anthony Oden; OL	Recruit ratings: Scout: Rivals: (72)					
Ross Rasner; ATH	Waco, TX	Reicher Catholic HS	6 ft 1 in (1.85 m)	200 lb (91 kg)	4.6	Jul 17, 2008
Ross Rasner; ATH	Recruit ratings: Scout: Rivals: (75)					
Lance Ray; ATH	Havana, FL	East Gadsden HS	6 ft 2 in (1.88 m)	193 lb (88 kg)	4.45	Dec 8, 2008
Lance Ray; ATH	Recruit ratings: Scout: Rivals: (79)					
Andru Stewart; DB	Bakersfield, CA	College of the Sequoias	5 ft 11 in (1.80 m)	191 lb (87 kg)	4.5	Dec 20, 2008
Andru Stewart; DB	Recruit ratings: Scout: Rivals:					
Travis Swanson; OL	Kingwood, TX	Kingwood HS	6 ft 5 in (1.96 m)	271 lb (123 kg)	5.45	Aug 4, 2008
Travis Swanson; OL	Recruit ratings: Scout: Rivals: (76)					
Austin Tate; TE	Harrison, AR	Harrison HS	6 ft 6 in (1.98 m)	228 lb (103 kg)	4.75	May 30, 2008
Austin Tate; TE	Recruit ratings: Scout: Rivals: (76)					
Robert Thomas; DT	Muskogee, OK	Muskogee HS	6 ft 1 in (1.85 m)	305 lb (138 kg)	N/A	Oct 20, 2008
Robert Thomas; DT	Recruit ratings: Scout: Rivals: (74)					
Zhamal Thomas; OL	New Iberia, LA	Navarro CC	6 ft 5 in (1.96 m)	325 lb (147 kg)	5.05	Dec 8, 2008
Zhamal Thomas; OL	Recruit ratings: Scout: Rivals:					
Terrell Williams; ATH	Tulsa, OK	Union HS	6 ft 3 in (1.91 m)	215 lb (98 kg)	4.59	Jan 18, 2009
Terrell Williams; ATH	Recruit ratings: Scout: Rivals: (75)					
Turell Williams; RB	West Helena, AR	Central HS	6 ft 2 in (1.88 m)	215 lb (98 kg)	4.5	Apr 3, 2008
Turell Williams; RB	Recruit ratings: Scout: Rivals: (77)					
Ronnie Wingo Jr. ATH	St. Louis, MO	St. Louis University HS	6 ft 2 in (1.88 m)	212 lb (96 kg)	4.4	Jan 27, 2009
Ronnie Wingo Jr. ATH	Recruit ratings: Scout: Rivals: (79)					
Darius Winston; DB	West Helena, AR	Central HS	6 ft 1 in (1.85 m)	180 lb (82 kg)	4.3	Sep 5, 2008
Darius Winston; DB	Recruit ratings: Scout: Rivals: (84)					
Overall recruit ranking: Scout: 20 Rivals: 15
‡ Refers to 40-yard dash; Note: In many cases, Scout, Rivals, 247Sports, On3, and ESPN may conflict in their listings of height, weight and 40 time.; In these cases, the average was taken. ESPN grades are on a 100-point scale.; Sources: "Arkansas 2009 Football Commitments". Rivals.; "2009 Arkansas Commits". Scout.; "2009 Player Commitments - Arkansas". ESPN.; "Scout.com Team Recruiting Rankings". Scout.; "2009 Team Ranking". Rivals.com.

== Statistics ==
=== Team ===
Statistics	Arkansas	Opponents
Scoring	468	326
Points per game	36.0	25.1
First downs	254	267
Rushing	89	112
Passing	147	136
Penalties	18	19
Total offensive yards	5,555	5,215
Rushing	1,713	1,985
Passing	3,842	3,230
Fumbles–Lost	18–6	25–17
Penalties–Yards	87–675	89–671

Statistics	Arkansas	Opponents
Punts–Yards	65–2,456	63–2,485
Average per punt	37.8	39.4
Average ToP/game	28:50	31:09
3rd down conversions	54/162	66/180
3rd down percentage	33	37
4th down conversions	10/20	4/16
4th down percentage	50	25
Touchdowns scored	60	38
Field goals–Att	16–22	21–27
PAT–Att	58–60	33–35
Attendance	45,5783	33,6155
Average	65,112	84,039

==== Scores by quarter ====
	1	2	3	4	OT	Total
Arkansas	100	133	150	82	3	468
Opponents	57	81	133	52	3	326

=== Offense ===
==== Rushing ====
Name	GP-GS	Att	Gain	Loss	Net Yds	Avg	TD	Long	Avg/G
Broderick Green	13–3	104	459	17	442	4.2	11	99	34.0
Michael Smith	8–5	71	413	17	396	5.6	2	33	49.5
Dennis Johnson	13–2	57	369	27	342	6.0	0	46	26.3
Ronnie Wingo Jr.	13–1	49	336	17	319	6.5	3	62	24.5
Knile Davis	13–1	33	166	3	163	4.9	4	36	12.5
Brandon Barnett	13–0	7	46	0	46	6.6	0	11	3.5
Joe Adams	10–7	5	36	5	31	6.2	1	18	3.1
Van Stumon	12–2	2	4	0	4	2.0	0	2	0.3
TEAM	7–0	4	11	8	3	0.8	0	11	0.4
Deanthony Curtis	13–2	1	3	0	3	3.0	0	3	0.2
Dylan Breeding	12–0	1	1	0	1	1.0	0	1	0.1
Tyler Wilson	5–0	2	2	2	0	0.0	0	2	0.0
Cobi Hamilton	13–1	1	0	8	-8	-8.0	0	0	-0.6
Ryan Mallett	13–13	58	145	174	-29	-0.5	2	19	-2.2
Total	13	395	1,991	278	1,713	4.3	23	99	131.8
Opponents	13	501	2,379	394	1,985	4.0	15	80	152.7

==== Passing ====
Name	GP-GS	Effic	Cmp-Att	Pct	Yds	TD	Int	Lng	Avg/G
Ryan Mallett	13–13	152.46	225–403	55.8	3,624	30	7	83	278.8
Tyler Wilson	5–0	119.20	22–36	61.1	218	2	2	21	43.6
Total	13	149.73	247–439	56.3	3,842	32	9	83	295.5
Opponents	13	137.85	239–404	59.2	3,230	22	13	80	248.5

==== Receiving ====
Name	GP–GS	Rec	Yards	Avg	TD	Long	Avg/G
Greg Childs	13–8	48	894	18.6	7	75	68.8
Jarius Wright	13–12	41	681	16.6	5	58	52.4
D. J. Williams	13–9	32	411	12.8	3	69	31.6
Joe Adams	10–7	29	568	19.6	7	78	56.8
Cobi Hamilton	13–1	19	347	18.3	3	64	26.7
Michael Smith	8–5	16	163	10.2	1	29	20.4
London Crawford	10–5	14	184	13.1	0	26	18.4
Dennis Johnson	13–2	10	72	7.2	0	18	5.5
Broderick Green	13–3	8	104	13.0	1	39	8.0
Lucas Miller	11–2	7	83	11.9	1	16	7.5
Ronnie Wingo Jr.	13–1	5	99	19.8	1	83	7.6
Reggie Fish	12–1	4	57	14.2	0	32	4.8
Deanthony Curtis	13–2	4	54	13.5	1	29	4.2
Carlton Salters	8–0	3	81	27.0	1	58	10.1
Ben Cleveland	13–1	3	33	11.0	0	13	2.5
Knile Davis	13–1	2	4	2.0	0	5	0.3
John Durmon	9–2	1	5	5.0	0	5	0.6
Van Stumon	12–2	1	2	2.0	1	2	0.2
Total	13	247	3,842	15.6	32	83	295.5
Opponents	13	239	3,230	13.5	22	80	248.5

=== Defense ===
Name	GP–GS	Tackles				Sacks	Pass Defense			Fumbles		Blkd	Safety
Name	GP–GS	Solo	Ast	Total	Loss–Yds	No.–Yds	Int–Yds	PD	Qbh	Rcv–Yds	FF	Kick	Safety
Jerry Franklin	13–12	51	43	94	5.0–14	1.5–8	3–61	3		2–85			
Wendel Davis	11–11	46	33	79	8.5–20	1.0–4	1–5	3	1	1–0			
Jerico Nelson	13–7	45	29	74	6.5–32	2.5–24	1–39	2	1	1–0	1		
Matt Harris	12–10	51	20	71	1.0–3		1–0	2					
Elton Ford	11–8	34	31	65	1.0–2			2	1	1–3			
Ramon Broadway	11–5	31	24	55	2.0–3			4		3–0	1		
Freddy Burton	13–7	35	19	54	4.5–26	2.0–23	1–50	1	1	1–0	1		
Adrian Davis	13–12	33	17	50	10.5–57	5.5–38			2	1–0	1		
Rudell Crim	13–13	25	18	43	2.0–3			4	1				
Zach Stadther	13–8	17	25	42	1.0–2	0.5–2				2–0			
Jake Bequette	13–8	20	19	39	9.0–48	5.5–37		2	8	2–0	2		
Tenarius Wright	13–1	21	13	34	7.0–28	1.5–7					3		
Malcom Sheppard	13–13	17	16	33	11.0–39	2.5–19		3	4	1–0			
Tramain Thomas	9–4	19	13	32	1.0–2		3–37			1–0	1		
DeQuinta Jones	12–3	17	7	24	3.5–26	2.5–24		1					
Andru Stewart	12–4	18	3	21	2.0–3		1–30	1			1		
Anthony Leon	13–2	11	9	20	1.0–5			1					
Lavunce Askew	10–1	6	12	18	2.5–9	1.5–8			1				
Jerell Norton	12–2	10	4	14			2–0	2		1–1			
Damario Ambrose	13–5	9	4	13	0.5–1								
David Gordon	10–3	9	2	11	1.0–3								
Ross Rasner	11–0	7	4	11				1	1				
Terell Williams	13–1	4	5	9				1					
Austin Moss	11–0	7	1	8									
Patrick Jones	10–0	4	4	8	2.0–5	0.5–3			1				
Greg Gatson	9–0	5	2	7				1					
Seth Armbrust	13–0	5	2	7								2	
Bret Harris	13–2	4	2	6	1.5–3			1					
Cameron Bryan	8–0	5	1	6									
Darius Winston	4–0	6		6									
Deanthony Curtis	13–2	2	3	5									
Jarius Wright	13–12	2	3	5									
Knile Davis	13–1	4		4									
Cobi Hamilton	13–1	4		4									
Ronnie Wingo, Jr.	13–1	2	2	4									
Jelani Smith	7–0	1	2	3									
Lucas Miller	11–2	2	1	3									
Alex Tejada	13–0	3		3									
Caleb Evans	3–0	2		2	1.0–5	1.0–5					1		
Alfred Davis	11–1	2		2									
Jermaine Love	3–0	1	1	2									
M. Villegas	1–0		1	1									
Broderick Green	13–3	1		1									
Michael Smith	8–5	1		1									
Robert Salinas	3–0	1		1					1				
C.Berezansky	2–0	1		1									
D. J. Williams	13–9	1		1									
Van Stumon	12–2		1	1									
Dylan Breeding	12–0	1		1									
Mitch Petrus	13–13	1		1									
R. Richardson	13–0		1	1									
Dustin Cain	1–0		1	1									
TEAM	7–0												1
Total	13	604	398	1,002	85–339	29–211	13–222	34	24	17–89	12	2	1
Opponents	13	505	317	822	72–281	24–168	9–96	53	28	6–3	4	1	

=== Special teams ===
==== Kicking ====
Name	PATs			Field Goals		
Name	Made	Att	%	Made	Att	%
Alex Tejada	58	59	98.3	16	22	72.7
Total	58	59	98.3	16	22	72.7

==== Punting ====
Name	No.	Yds	Avg	Long	TB	FC	In20	50+	blk
Dylan Breeding	61	2,359	38.7	54	2	15	14	6	1
Briton Forester	3	97	32.3	35	0	2	1	0	0
TEAM	1	0	0	0	0	0	0	0	0
Total	65	2,456	37.8	54	2	17	15	6	1
Opponents	63	2,485	39.4	64	4	24	18	11	2

==== Returns ====
Name	Punt returns					Kickoff returns				
Name	No.	Yds	Avg	TD	Long	No.	Yds	Avg	TD	Long
Seth Armbrust	1	36	36.0	1	1	5	82	16.4	0	21
Joe Adams	1	0	0.0	0	0	2	41	20.5	0	28
Jerell Norton	9	77	8.6	0	38	—				
Reggie Fish	2	11	5.5	0	11	—				
Michael Smith	1	6	6.0	0	6	—				
TEAM	1	-3	-3.0	0	0	—				
Dennis Johnson	—					40	1,031	25.8	1	91
Brandon Barnett	—					3	52	17.3	0	22
Terell Williams	—					2	19	9.5	0	14
Cobi Hamilton	—					1	50	50.0	0	50
Ben Cleveland	—					1	8	8.0	0	8
Total	15	127	8.5	1	38	54	1,283	23.8	1	91
Opponents	25	295	11.8	1	87	79	1,670	21.1	0	45
