= 2009 Mississippi State Bulldogs football team =

American college football season

2009 Mississippi State Bulldogs football
- Conference: Southeastern Conference
- Western Division
- Record: 5–7 (3–5 SEC)
- Head coach: Dan Mullen (1st season)
- Offensive coordinator: Les Koenning (1st season)
- Offensive scheme: Spread option
- Defensive coordinator: Carl Torbush (1st season)
- Home stadium: Davis Wade Stadium

2009 Southeastern Conference football standings
	Conf.			Overall
Team	W		L	W		L
Eastern Division
No. 3 Florida x%	8	–	0	13	–	1
Georgia	4	–	4	8	–	5
Tennessee	4	–	4	7	–	6
Kentucky	3	–	5	7	–	6
South Carolina	3	–	5	7	–	6
Vanderbilt	0	–	8	2	–	10
Western Division
No. 1 Alabama x$#	8	–	0	14	–	0
No. 17 LSU	5	–	3	9	–	4
No. 20 Ole Miss	4	–	4	9	–	4
Arkansas	3	–	5	8	–	5
Auburn	3	–	5	8	–	5
Mississippi State	3	–	5	5	–	7
Championship: Alabama 32, Florida 13
# – BCS National Champion; $ – BCS representative as conference champion; % – BCS at-large representative; x – Division champion/co-champions; Rankings from AP Poll

The 2009 Mississippi State Bulldogs football team represented Mississippi State University during the 2009 NCAA Division I FBS football season. Mississippi State has been a member of the Southeastern Conference (SEC) since the league's inception in 1932, and has participated in that conference's Western Division since 1992. The Bulldogs played their home games in 2009 at Davis Wade Stadium at Scott Field in Starkville, Mississippi, which has been MSU football's home stadium since 1914.

Head coach Sylvester Croom resigned at the end of the 2008 season. The position was filled by former Florida offensive coordinator Dan Mullen, making this Mullen's first stint as a head coach. The Bulldogs finished the season 5–7 (3–5 SEC). The NCAA rated MSU's 2009 schedule as the toughest in the country and the 2nd toughest in the past 10 years.

On November 30, 2009, Mississippi State running back Anthony Dixon was awarded the Conerly Trophy as the best college football player in the State of Mississippi. He joined previous MSU Conerly Trophy winners J.J. Johnson and Jerious Norwood.

== Schedule ==
Date	Time	Opponent	Site	TV	Result	Attendance	Source
September 5	2:30 p.m.	Jackson State*	Davis Wade Stadium; Starkville, MS	ESPNU	W 45–7	54,232	
September 12	6:00 p.m.	at Auburn	Jordan-Hare Stadium; Auburn, AL	SECRN	L 24–49	85,269	
September 19	6:00 p.m.	at Vanderbilt	Vanderbilt Stadium; Nashville, TN	SECRN	W 15–3	31,840	
September 26	11:21 a.m.	No. 7 LSU	Davis Wade Stadium; Starkville, MS (rivalry)	SECN	L 26–30	53,612	
October 3	6:30 p.m.	No. 25 Georgia Tech*	Davis Wade Stadium; Starkville, MS	CSS	L 31–42	50,035	
October 10	11:30 a.m.	Houston*^{†}	Davis Wade Stadium; Starkville, MS	ESPNU	L 24–31	48,019	
October 17	11:30 a.m.	at Middle Tennessee*	Johnny "Red" Floyd Stadium; Murfreesboro, TN	ESPNU	W 27–6	23,882	
October 24	6:30 p.m.	No. 1 Florida	Davis Wade Stadium; Starkville, MS	ESPN	L 19–29	57,178	
October 31	6:00 p.m.	at Kentucky	Commonwealth Stadium; Lexington, KY	SECRN	W 31–24	67,953	
November 14	6:00 p.m.	No. 2 Alabama	Davis Wade Stadium; Starkville, MS (rivalry)	ESPN	L 3–31	58,103	
November 21	11:21 a.m.	at Arkansas	War Memorial Stadium; Little Rock, AR	SECN	L 21–42	55,634	
November 28	11:21 a.m.	No. 25 Ole Miss	Davis Wade Stadium; Starkville, MS (Egg Bowl)	SECN	W 41–27	55,365	
*Non-conference game; ^{†}Homecoming; Rankings from AP Poll released prior to the game; All times are in Central time

== Personnel ==
=== Coaching staff ===
- Dan Mullen, head coach
- Mark Hudspeth, passing game coordinator
- John Hevesy, run game coordinator/offensive line coach
- Tony Hughes, assistant head coach, defensive backs coach
- Greg Knox, running backs coach
- Les Koenning, offensive coordinator
- Melvin Smith
- Reed Stringer
- Carl Torbush, defensive coordinator
- David Turner
- Matt Balis, head strength coach
- Tom Kaufman, graduate assistant

=== Depth chart ===
Defense

FS
Johnthan Banks
Wade Bonner

WLB	MLB	SLB
⋅	Jamar Chaney	⋅
Karlin Brown	Brandon Wilson	⋅

SS
Charles Mitchell
Emmanuel Gatling

CB
Marcus Washington
Corey Broomfield

DE	DT	DT	DE
Brandon Cooper	Charles Burns	Kyle Love	Pernell McPhee
Nick Bell	Fletcher Cox	Josh Boyd	Sean Ferguson

CB
Maurice Langston
Damein Anderson

Offense

X
Brandon McRae
Leon Berry

H
Chad Bumphis
Brandon Heavens

LT	LG	C	RG	RT
Derek Sherrod	Quentin Saulsberry	J.C. Brignone	Craig Jenkins	Addison Lawrence
Chris Spencer	Mark Melichar	D.J. Looney	Tobias Smith	Phillip Freeman

TE
Marcus Green
Kendrick Cook

Z
O'Neal Wilder
Tay Bowser

QB
Tyson Lee
Chris Relf

Key reserves
RB Arnil Stallworth
RB Robert Elliot
WR Chris Smith
FB Patrick Hanrahan
FS Zach Smith

RB
Anthony Dixon
Christian Ducre'

Special teams
PK Derek DePasuale
PK Sean Brauchle
P Heath Hutchins
KR Leon Berry
PR Leon Berry
LS Aaron Feld
H Chris Cameron

== Statistics ==
=== Team ===
==== Scores by quarter ====
	1	2	3	4	Total
Mississippi State	21	30	31	28	110
Opponents	27	20	21	21	89
