= 2009 Ole Miss Rebels football team =

American college football season

2009 Ole Miss Rebels football

Cotton Bowl Classic champion

Cotton Bowl Classic, W 21–7 vs. Oklahoma State
- Conference: Southeastern Conference
- Western Division

Ranking
- Coaches: No. 21
- AP: No. 20
- Record: 9–4 (4–4 SEC)
- Head coach: Houston Nutt (2nd season)
- Offensive coordinator: Kent Austin (2nd season)
- Offensive scheme: Multiple; pro-style, WildRebel
- Defensive coordinator: Tyrone Nix (2nd season)
- Base defense: 4–3
- Home stadium: Vaught–Hemingway Stadium

2009 Southeastern Conference football standings
	Conf.			Overall
Team	W		L	W		L
Eastern Division
No. 3 Florida x%	8	–	0	13	–	1
Georgia	4	–	4	8	–	5
Tennessee	4	–	4	7	–	6
Kentucky	3	–	5	7	–	6
South Carolina	3	–	5	7	–	6
Vanderbilt	0	–	8	2	–	10
Western Division
No. 1 Alabama x$#	8	–	0	14	–	0
No. 17 LSU	5	–	3	9	–	4
No. 20 Ole Miss	4	–	4	9	–	4
Arkansas	3	–	5	8	–	5
Auburn	3	–	5	8	–	5
Mississippi State	3	–	5	5	–	7
Championship: Alabama 32, Florida 13
# – BCS National Champion; $ – BCS representative as conference champion; % – BCS at-large representative; x – Division champion/co-champions; Rankings from AP Poll

The 2009 Ole Miss Rebels football team represented the University of Mississippi during the 2009 NCAA Division I FBS football season. The team was led by Houston Nutt, who was in his second season as the Rebels' head coach. Ole Miss has been a member of the Southeastern Conference (SEC) since the league's inception in 1932, and has participated in that conference's Western Division since its formation in 1992. The Rebels played their seven home games in 2009 at Vaught–Hemingway Stadium in Oxford, Mississippi, which has been Ole Miss football's home since 1915. The Rebels finished the season 9–4, 4–4 in SEC play and won their second straight Cotton Bowl Classic 21–7 against Oklahoma State.

== Previous season ==
First year head coach Houston Nutt led the team from four straight losing seasons to a 9–4 record and a 5–3 mark in conference play. The improvement from 2007–2008 was the best single-season improvement for an Ole Miss team since 1947, when Johnny Vaught debuted as coach. The Rebels' second- place finish in the SEC Western Division was their second best finish in the division since its inception in 1992. The 2008 squad concluded the season by defeating Texas Tech 47–34 in the 2009 Cotton Bowl.

=== Key losses from the 2008 season team ===
- Michael Oher – graduated; drafted in the first round of the 2009 NFL draft by the Baltimore Ravens
- Peria Jerry – graduated; drafted in the first round of the 2009 NFL Draft by the Atlanta Falcons
- Mike Wallace – graduated; drafted in the third round of the 2009 NFL Draft by the Pittsburgh Steelers
- Jamarca Sanford – graduated; drafted in the seventh round of the 2009 NFL Draft by the Minnesota Vikings
- Tony Fein – graduated; signed as a free agent with the Seattle Seahawks and later was signed by the Baltimore Ravens before being cut

== Rankings ==
Ranking movements Legend: ██ Increase in ranking ██ Decrease in ranking — = Not ranked т = Tied with team above or below
	Week																
Poll	Pre	1	2	3	4	5	6	7	8	9	10	11	12	13	14	15	Final
AP	8	6	5т^{*}	4	21	20	—	—	24	—	—	—	20	—	—	—	20
Coaches	10	8	6	5	18	16	—	25	22	—	—	—	25	—	—	—	21
Harris	Not released				18	18	—	—	23	—	—	—	25	—	—	—	Not released
BCS	Not released							—	25	—	—	—	25	—	—	—	Not released

^{*} Tied with Penn State

== Schedule ==
Date	Time	Opponent	Rank	Site	TV	Result	Attendance
September 6	2:30 p.m.	at Memphis*	No. 8	Liberty Bowl Memorial Stadium; Memphis, TN (rivalry)	ESPN	W 45–14	45,207
September 19	6:30 p.m.	Southeastern Louisiana*	No. 5	Vaught–Hemingway Stadium; Oxford, MS	CSS	W 52–6	58,119
September 24	6:30 p.m.	at South Carolina	No. 4	Williams-Brice Stadium; Columbia, SC	ESPN	L 10–16	74,724
October 3	6:00 p.m.	at Vanderbilt	No. 21	Vanderbilt Stadium; Nashville, TN (rivalry)	ESPNU	W 23–7	39,625
October 10	2:30 p.m.	No. 3 Alabama	No. 20	Vaught–Hemingway Stadium; Oxford, MS (rivalry)	CBS	L 3–22	62,657
October 17	6:00 p.m.	UAB*^{†}		Vaught–Hemingway Stadium; Oxford, MS	SECRN	W 48–13	47,612
October 24	11:21 a.m.	Arkansas		Vaught–Hemingway Stadium; Oxford, MS (rivalry)	SECN	W 30–17	60,622
October 31	11:21 a.m.	at Auburn	No. 24	Jordan–Hare Stadium; Auburn, AL (rivalry)	SECN	L 20–33	84,756
November 7	6:30 p.m.	Northern Arizona*		Vaught–Hemingway Stadium; Oxford, MS	CSS	W 38–14	38,184
November 14	11:00 a.m.	Tennessee		Vaught–Hemingway Stadium; Oxford, MS (rivalry)	CBS	W 42–17	61,422
November 21	2:30 p.m.	No. 10 LSU		Vaught–Hemingway Stadium; Oxford, MS (Magnolia Bowl)	CBS	W 25–23	61,752
November 28	11:21 a.m.	at Mississippi State	No. 20	Davis Wade Stadium; Starkville, MS (Egg Bowl)	SECN	L 27–41	55,365
January 2	1:00 p.m.	vs. No. 21 Oklahoma State*		Cowboys Stadium; Arlington, TX (Cotton Bowl Classic)	FOX	W 21–7	77,928
*Non-conference game; ^{†}Homecoming; Rankings from AP Poll released prior to the game; All times are in Central time

=== Schedule notes ===
- The 2009 Ole Miss Football Schedule was officially released on March 17, 2009.
- ESPN.com tabbed Ole Miss' 2009 non-conference schedule as the 3rd softest in the country.
- The week one game against Memphis was played on Sunday, September 6 and was nationally televised on ESPN.
- The week four game against South Carolina was played on Thursday, September 24, as part of the ESPN College Football Thursday Primetime package.
- The 2009 season marked the first time Ole Miss has ever played Southeastern Louisiana, UAB and Northern Arizona in football.

== 2009 season highlights ==
On July 7, 2009, the Ole Miss athletic department announced that the 2009 training camp and team would be the subject of a reality television show called Gridiron U, which will air on TruTV (formerly known as Court TV). Filming was scheduled to begin in early August and end September 6. The camera crew came in June to interview players and coaches as well as to film key locations on campus. However, head coach Houston Nutt canceled the team's participation in the new show.

Ole Miss was on the cover of Sports Illustrated for the August 17, 2009 issue. SI's preseason rankings has the Rebels ranked at #6.

In late August 2009, the Ole Miss Athletic Department announced that season tickets were sold out for what is believed to be the first time in school history.

In the third week of the season, on September 20, 2009, Ole Miss was ranked #4 in the AP poll and #5 in the Coaches Poll, the highest the Rebels have been ranked since the Archie Manning-lead, and John Vaught-coached, team of 1970 which also made it to #4. Ole Miss' highest ranking ever was #1 in 1964.

Ole Miss set a school record with four straight games, going back to the 2008 season, of scoring forty or more points after defeating Southeastern Louisiana 52–6 on September 19, 2009. Also as of the Southeastern Louisiana win, the Rebels had the second longest winning streak in the nation, having won eight straight games dating back to the 2008 season. The national champion Florida team had the first longest winning streak after Utah lost.

Ole Miss' defeat of Tennessee on November 14, 2009 was the first time Tennessee had ever lost in Ole Miss' home stadium. Tennessee now holds a 5–1 mark against Ole Miss in Ole Miss' home stadium.

Ole Miss' defeat of LSU on November 21, 2009 was the Rebels first win at home against LSU since 1998.

== Game summaries ==
=== Memphis ===
Team	1	2	3	4	Total
• #8 Ole Miss	10	7	0	28	45
Memphis	0	7	0	7	14

- Location: Memphis, TN
- Game start: 2:36 p.m.
- Elapsed time: 3:23
- Game attendance: 45,207
- Game weather: Partly Cloudy, 82, Wind: S @ 6 mph
- Referee: Marc Curles
- Television network: ESPN

=== Southeastern Louisiana ===
Team	1	2	3	4	Total
S'eastern Louisiana	0	0	3	3	6
• #5t Ole Miss	7	17	14	14	52

- Location: Oxford, MS
- Game start: 6:36 p.m.
- Elapsed time: 3:12
- Game attendance: 58,119
- Game weather: Partly Cloudy, 77, Wind: E @ 3 mph
- Referee: Matt Moore
- Television network: CSS

=== South Carolina ===
Team	1	2	3	4	Total
#4 Ole Miss	3	0	0	7	10
• South Carolina	0	6	10	0	16

- Location: Columbia, SC
- Game start: 7:45 p.m.
- Elapsed time: 3:23
- Game attendance: 74,724
- Game weather: Partly Cloudy, 87, Wind: S @ 3 mph
- Referee: Hubert Owens
- TV announcers (ESPN): Chris Fowler (play-by-play), Craig James and Jesse Palmer (color), Erin Andrews (sideline)

=== Vanderbilt ===
Team	1	2	3	4	Total
• #21 Ole Miss	3	14	6	0	23
Vanderbilt	0	0	7	0	7

- Location: Nashville, TN
- Game start: 6:06 p.m.
- Elapsed time: 3:14
- Game attendance: 39,625
- Game weather: Fair, 67, Wind: WSW @ 11 mph
- Referee: Steve Shaw
- Television network: ESPNU

=== Alabama ===
Team	1	2	3	4	Total
• #3 Alabama	3	13	3	3	22
#20 Ole Miss	0	0	3	0	3

- Location: Oxford, MS
- Game start: 2:30 p.m.
- Elapsed time: 3:27
- Game attendance:
  62,657 (record set)
- Game weather: Cloudy, 54, Wind: S @ 6 mph
- Referee: Tom Ritter
- TV announcers (CBS): Craig Bolerjack (play-by-play), Steve Beuerlein (color)

=== UAB ===
Team	1	2	3	4	Total
UAB	0	0	0	13	13
• Ole Miss	7	20	14	7	48

- Location: Oxford, MS
- Game start: 6:00 p.m.
- Elapsed time: 3:07
- Game attendance: 47,612
- Game weather: Cloudy, 52, Wind: N @ 6 mph
- Referee: Ken Williamson
- Television network: FSN

=== Arkansas ===
Team	1	2	3	4	Total
Arkansas	0	7	10	0	17
• Ole Miss	14	3	7	6	30

- Location: Oxford, MS
- Game start: 11:21 a.m.
- Elapsed time: 3:11
- Game attendance: 60,622
- Game weather: Fair, 52, Wind: NW @ 8 mph
- Referee: Matt Moore
- TV announcers (SEC Network): Dave Neal (play-by-play), Andre Ware (color), Cara Capuano (sideline)

=== Auburn ===
Team	1	2	3	4	Total
#24 Ole Miss	7	0	13	0	20
• Auburn	3	7	23	0	33

- Location: Auburn, AL
- Game start: 11:21 a.m.
- Elapsed time: 3:35
- Game attendance: 84,756
- Game weather: Cloudy, 57, Wind: NW @ 10mph
- Referee: Penn Wagers
- TV announcers (SEC Network): Dave Neal (play-by-play), Andre Ware (color), Cara Capuano (sideline)

=== Northern Arizona ===
Team	1	2	3	4	Total
N Arizona	0	14	0	0	14
• Ole Miss	7	24	7	0	38

- Location: Oxford, MS
- Game start: 6:36 p.m.
- Elapsed time: 3:10
- Game attendance: 38,184
- Game weather: Clear, 61, Wind: calm
- Referee: Jeff Hilyer
- Television network: CSS

=== Tennessee ===
Team	1	2	3	4	Total
Tennessee	7	7	3	0	17
• Ole Miss	14	7	7	14	42

- Location: Oxford, MS
- Game start: 11:11 a.m.
- Elapsed time: 3:23
- Game attendance: 61,422
- Game weather: Fair, 61, Wind: SW @ 7 mph
- Referee: Steve Shaw
- TV announcers (CBS): Craig Bolerjack (play-by-play), Steve Beuerlein (color)

=== LSU ===
Magnolia Bowl

Team	1	2	3	4	Total
#10 LSU	14	3	0	6	23
• Ole Miss	6	9	0	10	25

- Location: Oxford, MS
- Game start: 2:36 p.m.
- Elapsed time: 3:36
- Game attendance: 61,752
- Game weather: Fair, 63, Wind: SW @ 5 mph
- Referee: Matt Austin
- TV announcers (CBS): Verne Lundquist (play-by-play), Gary Danielson (color), Tracy Wolfson (sideline)

=== Mississippi State ===
Egg Bowl

Team	1	2	3	4	Total
#20 Ole Miss	3	10	0	14	27
• MSU	0	10	17	14	41

- Location: Starkville, MS
- Game start: 11:21 a.m.
- Elapsed time: 3:09
- Game attendance: 55,365
- Game weather: Sunny and Clear, 51, Wind: WNW @ 5 mph
- Referee: Hubert Owens
- TV announcers (SEC Network): Dave Neal (play-by-play), Andre Ware (color), Cara Capuano (sideline)

=== Oklahoma State ===
2010 Cotton Bowl Classic

Team	1	2	3	4	Total
Oklahoma State	0	0	7	0	7
• Ole Miss	0	7	0	14	21

- Location: Arlington, TX
- Game start: 1:15 p.m.
- Elapsed time: 3:32
- Game attendance: 77,928
- Game weather: Indoor game
- Referee: Jack Childress (ACC)
- TV announcers (FOX): Pat Summerall (play-by-play), Daryl Johnston – (analyst), Krista Voda – (host), Shepard Smith – (sideline reporter)

== Coaching staff ==
Name	Responsibility	Position Group	Year	Alma mater
Houston Nutt	Head coach		2nd	Oklahoma State University (1981)
Kent Austin	Offensive Coordinator	Quarterbacks	2nd	University of Mississippi (Ole Miss) (1986)
Tyrone Nix	Defensive Coordinator	Linebackers	2nd	University of Southern Mississippi (1995)
Kim Dameron		Safeties	2nd	University of Arkansas (1983)
Ron Dickerson Jr.		Wide Receivers	2nd	University of Arkansas (1996)
Mike Markuson	Running Game Coordinator	Offensive line	2nd	Hamline University (1983)
Derrick Nix		Running Backs	2nd	University of Southern Mississippi (2002)
Terry Price		Defensive line	1st	Texas A&M University (1992)
James Shibest	Special Teams Coordinator	Tight Ends	2nd	University of Arkansas (1988)
Chris Vaughn	Recruiting Coordinator	Cornerbacks	2nd	Murray State University (1998)
Andy Commer	Coordinator of Video Services		2nd	Arkansas State University (1987)
Mike Beaumont	Assistant Athletics Director for Football Operations		2nd	Arkansas State University (1992)
Don Decker	Head Football Strength Coach		2nd	Evangel College (1988)
Tim Mullins	Head Athletic Trainer		12th	University of Mississippi (Ole Miss) (1991)
Clifton Ealy	Assistant Athletics Director for Community Relations		2nd	University of Central Arkansas (1982)
Danny Nutt	Assistant Athletics Director for Player Development		2nd	University of Arkansas (1985)
Ken Crain	Head Equipment Manager		11th	University of Mississippi (Ole Miss) (1996)
Lanier Goethie	Graduate Assistant Coach		1st	University of Mississippi (Ole Miss) (2003)
Adam Hicks	Quality Control		1st	University of Tennessee (2009)
Alan Hensell	Graduate Assistant		3rd	Franklin College (Indiana) (2005)

=== Staff notes ===
- On January 16, Terry Price began his second stint with the Ole Miss Rebels football staff. He coached defensive ends for the Rebels from 1995–98. He then went on to be the defensive line coach at Auburn from 1999 to 2008.
- On January 20, former Rebel football player Lanier Goethie signed on as a graduate assistant. In his four years playing Linebacker for Ole Miss (1999 to 2002), he had a total of 178 tackles and served as a team co-captain as a senior. He was also the 2002 Chucky Mullins Courage Award recipient.

== NFL prospects ==
Twelve Ole Miss players who ended their career at Ole Miss this year were either taken in the 2010 NFL draft or signed free-agent contracts with NFL teams. Dexter McCluster (Kansas City Chiefs; 2nd round; 36th overall pick), OL John Jerry (Miami Dolphins; 3rd round; 73rd overall pick), S Kendrick Lewis (Kansas City Chiefs; 5th round; 136th overall pick) and DE Greg Hardy (Carolina Panthers; 6th round; 175th overall pick) were drafted while QB Jevan Snead (Tampa Bay Buccaneers), RB Cordera Eason (Cincinnati Bengals), TE Gerald Harris (Tennessee Titans), LB Patrick Trahan (Tennessee Titans), WR Shay Hodge (San Francisco 49ers), CB Marshay Green (Arizona Cardinals), CB Cassius Vaughn (Denver Broncos) and DE Emmanuel Stephens (Atlanta Falcons) signed free agent contracts.
