= 2009 South Carolina Gamecocks football team =

American college football season

2009 South Carolina Gamecocks football

Palmetto Bowl champion

PapaJohns.com Bowl, L 7–20 vs. Connecticut
- Conference: Southeastern Conference
- Eastern Division
- Record: 7–6 (3–5 SEC)
- Head coach: Steve Spurrier (5th season)
- Offensive scheme: Fun and gun
- Defensive coordinator: Ellis Johnson (2nd season)
- Base defense: 4–2–5
- Home stadium: Williams-Brice Stadium

Uniform

2009 Southeastern Conference football standings
	Conf.			Overall
Team	W		L	W		L
Eastern Division
No. 3 Florida x%	8	–	0	13	–	1
Georgia	4	–	4	8	–	5
Tennessee	4	–	4	7	–	6
Kentucky	3	–	5	7	–	6
South Carolina	3	–	5	7	–	6
Vanderbilt	0	–	8	2	–	10
Western Division
No. 1 Alabama x$#	8	–	0	14	–	0
No. 17 LSU	5	–	3	9	–	4
No. 20 Ole Miss	4	–	4	9	–	4
Arkansas	3	–	5	8	–	5
Auburn	3	–	5	8	–	5
Mississippi State	3	–	5	5	–	7
Championship: Alabama 32, Florida 13
# – BCS National Champion; $ – BCS representative as conference champion; % – BCS at-large representative; x – Division champion/co-champions; Rankings from AP Poll

The 2009 South Carolina Gamecocks football team represented the University of South Carolina in the 2009 NCAA Division I FBS football season. The team's head coach was Steve Spurrier, who was in his fifth season at USC. The Gamecocks played their home games at Williams–Brice Stadium in Columbia, South Carolina. Carolina finished the season 7–6, winning the Palmetto Bowl over in-state rival Clemson 34–17 in their final regular season game, before losing in the PapaJohns.com Bowl 20–7 against Connecticut.

South Carolina avoided a repeat of the quarterback controversy from last season, as Stephen Garcia earned a start in every game with "one of the top-five single seasons for a quarterback in Gamecock history". However, the Gamecocks returned very few proven skill players and faced what was called the most difficult schedule in the country. The Gamecocks still won most of the games on that schedule, including two against top-15 teams, though postseason struggles under Spurrier continued.

"Sandstorm" became a phenomenon. (Note: "Sandstorm" was introduced to South Carolina home football games during the near-upset over LSU in 2008. However, the upset over Ole Miss in 2009 is widely considered the start of "'Sandstorm' fever" at South Carolina.) The 1999 Finnish trance song was played before two decisive plays during a home game against No. 4 Ole Miss. With these plays, South Carolina sealed a historic upset, their first win against a top-5 team since 1981. After this, "Sandstorm" became cemented with the program and its fans. By 2010, it would be described as South Carolina's "unofficial anthem" and "second fight song".

Despite the 7–6 record and "embarrassing" bowl loss, the upsets over Ole Miss and Clemson have been described as catalysts to the most successful era in program history: an SEC East Championship in 2010 and 11-win seasons in 2011, 2012 and 2013. Each of those years also saw victories over Clemson – South Carolina's longest winning streak in the rivalry.

== Preseason ==
On April 11, 2009, the Garnet squad defeated the Black squad, 30–14, in the annual Garnet & Black Spring Game, in front of a crowd of 25,157. Redshirt sophomore quarterback Stephen Garcia finished the game 13–20 with 144 yards and two touchdowns, while true freshman Jarvis Giles led the ground game with 114 yards and two touchdowns on 12 carries.

== Schedule ==
Date	Time	Opponent	Rank	Site	TV	Result	Attendance	Source
September 3	7:30 pm	at NC State*		Carter–Finley Stadium; Raleigh, NC	ESPN	W 7–3	57,583	
September 12	7:00 pm	at No. 21 Georgia		Sanford Stadium; Athens, GA (rivalry)	ESPN2	L 37–41	92,746	
September 19	7:00 pm	Florida Atlantic*		Williams–Brice Stadium; Columbia, SC	PPV	W 38–16	72,017	
September 24	7:30 pm	No. 4 Ole Miss		Williams–Brice Stadium; Columbia, SC	ESPN	W 16–10	74,724	
October 3	7:00 pm	South Carolina State*		Williams–Brice Stadium; Columbia, SC	ESPNC	W 38–14	77,066	
October 10	12:30 pm	Kentucky	No. 25	Williams–Brice Stadium; Columbia, SC	SECRN	W 28–26	68,278	
October 17	7:45 pm	at No. 2 Alabama	No. 22	Bryant–Denny Stadium; Tuscaloosa, AL	ESPN	L 6–20	92,012	
October 24	7:00 pm	Vanderbilt^{†}	No. 23	Williams–Brice Stadium; Columbia, SC	ESPNU	W 14–10	75,624	
October 31	7:45 pm	at Tennessee	No. 21	Neyland Stadium; Knoxville, TN (rivalry)	ESPN	L 13–31	96,263	
November 7	12:21 pm	at Arkansas		Donald W. Reynolds Razorback Stadium; Fayetteville, AR	SECN	L 16–33	68,865	
November 14	3:30 pm	No. 1 Florida		Williams–Brice Stadium; Columbia, SC	CBS	L 14–24	79,297	
November 28	12:00 pm	No. 15 Clemson*		Williams–Brice Stadium; Columbia, SC (rivalry)	ESPN	W 34–17	80,574	
January 2	2:00 pm	vs. Connecticut*		Legion Field; Birmingham, AL (PapaJohns.com Bowl)	ESPN	L 7–20	45,254	
*Non-conference game; ^{†}Homecoming; Rankings from AP Poll released prior to the game; All times are in Eastern time

=== Schedule notes ===
- Carolina's 2009 schedule was rated the toughest in the nation by college football guru Phil Steele.
- Radio coverage for all games was on the Gamecock Sports Radio Network.
- The week four game against Ole Miss was played on Thursday, September 24, as part of the ESPN College Football Thursday Primetime package.
- The week eleven game against Florida on November 14, 2009, featured the Gamecocks wearing special black and desert camouflage uniforms designed by Under Armour in support of the Wounded Warrior Project.

== Game summaries ==
=== NC State ===
	1	2	3	4	Total
Gamecocks	7	0	0	0	7
Wolfpack	0	0	3	0	3

=== Georgia ===
	1	2	3	4	Total
Gamecocks	17	6	5	9	37
Bulldogs	14	17	7	3	41

=== Florida Atlantic ===
	1	2	3	4	Total
Owls	3	13	0	0	16
Gamecocks	10	7	21	0	38

=== Ole Miss ===
	1	2	3	4	Total
Rebels	3	0	0	7	10
Gamecocks	0	6	10	0	16

=== SC State ===
	1	2	3	4	Total
Bulldogs	0	7	0	7	14
Gamecocks	0	10	21	7	38

=== Kentucky ===
	1	2	3	4	Total
Wildcats	3	14	3	6	26
Gamecocks	7	7	7	7	28

=== Alabama ===
	1	2	3	4	Total
Gamecocks	0	6	0	0	6
Crimson Tide	10	3	0	7	20

=== Vanderbilt ===
	1	2	3	4	Total
Commodores	0	7	3	0	10
Gamecocks	0	7	0	7	14

=== Tennessee ===
	1	2	3	4	Total
Gamecocks	0	3	10	0	13
Volunteers	14	7	7	3	31

=== Arkansas ===
	1	2	3	4	Total
Gamecocks	3	7	6	0	16
Razorbacks	7	3	16	7	33

=== Florida ===
	1	2	3	4	Total
Gators	10	7	0	7	24
Gamecocks	7	7	0	0	14

=== vs Clemson (rivalry) ===
Game Twelve– No. 18 Clemson Tigers (8-3) at South Carolina Gamecocks (6-5) – Game summary

Quarter	1	2	3	4	Total
No. 18 Clemson	7	0	0	10	17
South Carolina	14	3	7	10	34

at Williams-Brice Stadium • Columbia, South Carolina

- Date: Saturday, November 28, 2009
- Game time: 12:00 p.m. EST
- Game weather: Temperature: • Wind: • Weather: Clear
- TV: ESPN

Game information

First quarter

- (14:41) CLEM – CJ Spiller 88-yard kickoff return (Richard Jackson kick) (Clemson 7-0)
- (5:21) SC – Brian Maddox 1-yard run (Spencer Lanning kick) (Drive: 7 plays, 60 yards, 3:23; Tied 7-7)
- (2:01) SC – Weslye Saunders 9-yard pass from Stephen Garcia (Spencer Lanning kick) (Drive: 2 plays, 11 yards, 0:45; South Carolina 14-7)

Second quarter

- (10:44) SC – Spencer Lanning 47-yard field goal (Drive: 11 plays, 47 yards, 4:03; South Carolina 17-7)

Third quarter

- (7:47) SC – Tori Gurley 14-yard pass from Stephen Garcia (Spencer Lanning kick) (Drive: 4 plays, 55 yards, 1:26; South Carolina 24-7)

Fourth quarter

- (11:23) CLEM – Richard Jackson 45-yard field goal (Drive: 6 plays, 41 yards, 1:52; South Carolina 24-10)
- (5:22) SC – Spencer Lanning 38-yard field goal (Drive: 11 plays, 49 yards, 6:01; South Carolina 27-10)
- (3:46) CLEM – Michael Palmer 22-yard pass from Kyle Parker (Richard Jackson kick) (Drive: 7 plays, 64 yards, 1:36; South Carolina 27-17)
- (2:40) SC – Weslye Saunders 1-yard pass from Stephen Garcia (Spencer Lanning kick) (Drive: 4 plays, 4 yards, 1:06; South Carolina 34-17)

Statistics	CLEM	SC
First downs	14	21
Total yards	61–260	80–388
Rushing yards	19–48	58–223
Passing yards	226	175
Passing: Comp–Att–Int	22–42–1	11–22–1
Time of possession	14:09	27:54

Team	Category	Player	Statistics
Clemson	Passing	Kyle Parker	22/42, 212 yards, TD, INT
Clemson	Rushing	CJ Spiller	9 carries, 18 yards
Clemson	Receiving	Michael Palmer	8 receptions, 106 yards, TD
South Carolina	Passing	Stephen Garcia	10/21, 126 yards, 3 TD, INT
South Carolina	Rushing	Kenny Miles	17 carries, 114 yards
South Carolina	Receiving	Alshon Jeffery	4 receptions, 65 yards

=== Connecticut ===
	1	2	3	4	Total
Huskies	10	3	0	7	20
Gamecocks	0	0	0	7	7

== Players ==
=== Depth chart ===
Projected starters and primary backups versus Clemson on November 28, 2009.

Defense

FS
Chris Culliver
Akeem Auguste

WLB	MLB	SLB
⋅	Shaq Wilson	⋅
Nathan Turner	Josh Dickerson	⋅

SS
Darian Stewart
DeVonte Holloman

CB
Akeem Auguste
C.C. Whitlock

DE	DT	DT	DE
Cliff Matthews	Ladi Ajiboye	Nathan Pepper	Clifton Geathers
Byron McKnight	Melvin Ingram	Kenny Davis	Devin Taylor

CB
Stephon Gilmore
D. J. Swearinger

Offense

WR
Alshon Jeffery
Jason Barnes

LT	LG	C	RG	RT
Kyle Nunn	Garrett Chisolm	Lemuel Jeanpierre	T. J. Johnson	Hutch Eckerson
Jarriel King	Garrett Anderson	Garrett Anderson	Lemuel Jeanpierre	Quintin Richardson

TE
Weslye Saunders
Justice Cunningham

WR
Moe Brown
Tori Gurley

QB
Stephen Garcia
Reid McCollum

Key reserves
RB Jarvis Giles
RB Eric Baker
WR D.L. Moore
WR Stephen Flint
WR Matt Clement
DE Aldrick Fordham
DE Chaz Sutton
SPUR Alonzo Winfield

RB
Brian Maddox
Kenny Miles

FB
Patrick DiMarco
Dalton Wilson

Special teams
PK Spencer Lanning
P Spencer Lanning
KR Bryce Sherman
PR Stephon Gilmore
LS Charles Turner

=== Awards ===
- Devin Taylor - SEC Defensive Lineman of the Week, 9/7/09; College Football News Third-Team Freshman All-American; SEC Coaches All-Freshmen Team; Rivals.com SEC All-Freshman Team
- Jarvis Giles – SEC Freshman of the Week, 9/21/09
- Eric Norwood – SEC Defensive Player of the Week, 9/28/09; Butkus Award Finalist; First-Team Coaches All-SEC; First-Team AP All-SEC; First-Team ESPN All-SEC; Walter Camp First-Team All-American; First-Team AP All-American
- Alshon Jeffery – SEC Freshman of the Week, 10/12/09; College Football News First-Team Freshman All-American; SEC Coaches All-Freshmen Team; Rivals.com SEC All-Freshman Team; Scout.com Freshman All-American Team; FWAA Freshman All-American Team
- Ladi Ajiboye - SEC Co-Defensive Lineman of the Week, 11/30/09
- Cliff Matthews – Second-Team Coaches All-SEC; Honorable Mention AP All-SEC
- Chris Culliver – Second-Team AP All-SEC
- Stephon Gilmore – College Football News First-Team Freshman All-American; SEC Coaches All-Freshmen Team; Rivals.com SEC Defensive Freshman of the Year; Scout.com Freshman All-American Team
- T.J. Johnson – SEC Coaches All-Freshmen Team; Rivals.com SEC All-Freshman Team

=== 2009 recruiting class ===
College recruiting
Name	Hometown	School	Height	Weight	40^{‡}	Commit date
Corey Addison; DB	Jacksonville, Florida	Andrew Jackson HS	6 ft 0 in (1.83 m)	185 lb (84 kg)	-	Aug 2, 2008
Corey Addison; DB	Recruit ratings: Scout: Rivals: (75)					
Nick Allison; OL	Asheville, North Carolina	T.C. Roberson HS	6 ft 4 in (1.93 m)	285 lb (129 kg)	5.0	Jun 7, 2008
Nick Allison; OL	Recruit ratings: Scout: Rivals: (76)					
DeMario Bennett; WR	Douglas, Georgia	Coffee County HS	6 ft 3 in (1.91 m)	185 lb (84 kg)	4.49	Jul 18, 2008
DeMario Bennett; WR	Recruit ratings: Scout: Rivals: (76)					
Ronald Byrd; DE	Fork Union, Virginia	Fork Union Military Academy	6 ft 6 in (1.98 m)	270 lb (120 kg)	4.8	Sep 25, 2008
Ronald Byrd; DE	Recruit ratings: Scout: Rivals: (70)					
Duane Chisolm; DE	Beaufort, South Carolina	Beaufort HS	6 ft 3 in (1.91 m)	250 lb (110 kg)	4.75	Dec 7, 2008
Duane Chisolm; DE	Recruit ratings: Scout: Rivals: (79)					
Andrew Clifford; QB	Tampa, Florida	Wharton HS	6 ft 3 in (1.91 m)	215 lb (98 kg)	4.8	Feb 1, 2009
Andrew Clifford; QB	Recruit ratings: Scout: Rivals: (75)					
Matt Coffee; ATH	Ft. Walton Beach, Florida	Ft. Walton Beach HS	5 ft 11 in (1.80 m)	214 lb (97 kg)	4.53	Jul 1, 2008
Matt Coffee; ATH	Recruit ratings: Scout: Rivals: (78)					
Justice Cunningham; TE	Pageland, South Carolina	Central HS	6 ft 3 in (1.91 m)	242 lb (110 kg)	4.78	Apr 19, 2008
Justice Cunningham; TE	Recruit ratings: Scout: Rivals: (78)					
Josh Dickerson; LB	Milledgeville, Georgia	Georgia Military College	6 ft 2 in (1.88 m)	215 lb (98 kg)	4.6	Sep 28, 2008
Josh Dickerson; LB	Recruit ratings: Scout: Rivals: (-)					
Aldrick Fordham; DE	St. Stephen, South Carolina	Timberland HS	6 ft 4 in (1.93 m)	234 lb (106 kg)	4.75	Jul 1, 2008
Aldrick Fordham; DE	Recruit ratings: Scout: Rivals: (79)					
Jarvis Giles; RB	Tampa, Florida	Gaither HS	6 ft 0 in (1.83 m)	180 lb (82 kg)	4.5	Dec 9, 2008
Jarvis Giles; RB	Recruit ratings: Scout: Rivals: (83)					
Stephon Gilmore; DB	Rock Hill, South Carolina	South Pointe HS	6 ft 2 in (1.88 m)	181 lb (82 kg)	4.5	Oct 14, 2008
Stephon Gilmore; DB	Recruit ratings: Scout: Rivals: (85)					
Chaun Gresham; LB	Winder, Georgia	Apalachee HS	6 ft 3 in (1.91 m)	205 lb (93 kg)	-	Aug 8, 2008
Chaun Gresham; LB	Recruit ratings: Scout: Rivals: (79)					
DeVonte Holloman; DB	Rock Hill, South Carolina	South Pointe HS	6 ft 2 in (1.88 m)	214 lb (97 kg)	4.5	Nov 14, 2008
DeVonte Holloman; DB	Recruit ratings: Scout: Rivals: (84)					
Charles Holmes; WR	Rock Hill, South Carolina	South Pointe HS	6 ft 4 in (1.93 m)	197 lb (89 kg)	4.55	Jul 19, 2008
Charles Holmes; WR	Recruit ratings: Scout: Rivals: (74)					
Alshon Jeffery; WR	St. Matthews, South Carolina	Calhoun County HS	6 ft 4 in (1.93 m)	214 lb (97 kg)	4.5	Feb 4, 2009
Alshon Jeffery; WR	Recruit ratings: Scout: Rivals: (81)					
Damario Jeffery; DB	Columbia, South Carolina	Columbia HS	6 ft 4 in (1.93 m)	215 lb (98 kg)	4.5	Aug 1, 2008
Damario Jeffery; DB	Recruit ratings: Scout: Rivals: (81)					
Jimmy Legree; ATH	Beaufort, South Carolina	Beaufort HS	6 ft 0 in (1.83 m)	172 lb (78 kg)	4.5	Aug 7, 2008
Jimmy Legree; ATH	Recruit ratings: Scout: Rivals: (77)					
Leon Mackey; DE	Chatham, Virginia	Hargrave Military Academy	6 ft 6 in (1.98 m)	260 lb (120 kg)	5.0	Feb 1, 2009
Leon Mackey; DE	Recruit ratings: Scout: Rivals: (77)					
Chris Payne; DB	Columbia, South Carolina	Columbia HS	5 ft 10 in (1.78 m)	190 lb (86 kg)	4.49	Mar 6, 2008
Chris Payne; DB	Recruit ratings: Scout: Rivals: (82)					
Lamar Scruggs; WR	Jacksonville, Florida	Duncan U. Fletcher HS	6 ft 3 in (1.91 m)	212 lb (96 kg)	-	Jan 27, 2009
Lamar Scruggs; WR	Recruit ratings: Scout: Rivals: (80)					
Steven Singleton; OL	Milledgeville, Georgia	Georgia Military College	6 ft 3 in (1.91 m)	310 lb (140 kg)	5.2	Dec 13, 2008
Steven Singleton; OL	Recruit ratings: Scout: Rivals: (-)					
DeAngelo Smith; WR	Kingsland, Georgia	Camden County HS	6 ft 0 in (1.83 m)	174 lb (79 kg)	-	Jul 18, 2008
DeAngelo Smith; WR	Recruit ratings: Scout: Rivals: (77)					
Quin Smith; LB	Lenoir, North Carolina	Hibriten HS	6 ft 2 in (1.88 m)	205 lb (93 kg)	4.63	Jun 10, 2008
Quin Smith; LB	Recruit ratings: Scout: Rivals: (77)					
Tony Straughter; LB	Milledgeville, Georgia	Georgia Military College	6 ft 1 in (1.85 m)	215 lb (98 kg)	4.55	Sep 21, 2008
Tony Straughter; LB	Recruit ratings: Scout: Rivals: (-)					
Chaz Sutton; DE	Fork Union, Virginia	Fork Union Military Academy	6 ft 4 in (1.93 m)	240 lb (110 kg)	4.8	Sep 25, 2008
Chaz Sutton; DE	Recruit ratings: Scout: Rivals: (78)					
D.J. Swearinger; DB	Greenwood, South Carolina	Greenwood HS	5 ft 11 in (1.80 m)	196 lb (89 kg)	4.44	Nov 23, 2008
D.J. Swearinger; DB	Recruit ratings: Scout: Rivals: (80)					
Rokevious Watkins; OL	Milledgeville, Georgia	Georgia Military College	6 ft 4 in (1.93 m)	340 lb (150 kg)	5.3	Dec 13, 2008
Rokevious Watkins; OL	Recruit ratings: Scout: Rivals: (-)					
Overall recruit ranking: Scout: 13 Rivals: 12 ESPN: 12
‡ Refers to 40-yard dash; Note: In many cases, Scout, Rivals, 247Sports, On3, and ESPN may conflict in their listings of height, weight and 40 time.; In these cases, the average was taken. ESPN grades are on a 100-point scale.; Sources: "South Carolina Signee List 2009". Rivals.; "Scout.com Football Recruiting: South Carolina". Scout.; "2009 Player Signees- South Carolina". ESPN.; "Scout.com Team Recruiting Rankings". Scout.; "2009 Team Ranking". Rivals.com.

== Rankings ==
Ranking movements Legend: ██ Increase in ranking ██ Decrease in ranking — = Not ranked
	Week															
Poll	Pre	1	2	3	4	5	6	7	8	9	10	11	12	13	14	Final
AP	—	—	—	—	—	25	22	23	21	—	—	—	—	—	—	—
Coaches	—	—	—	—	—	—	22	23	21	—	—	—	—	—	—	—
Harris	Not released				—	—	22	—	21	—	—	—	—	—	—	Not released
BCS	Not released							24	22	—	—	—	—	—	—	Not released

== Statistics ==
=== Scores by quarter ===
	1	2	3	4	Total
South Carolina	65	69	87	40	261
Opponents	71	78	39	57	245

=== Team ===
	USC	Opp
Scoring	261	245
Points per game	21.8	20.4
First downs	227	188
Rushing	86	97
Passing	125	79
Penalty	16	12
Total offense	4311	3656
Avg per play	5.3	4.8
Avg per game	359.2	304.7
Fumbles-Lost	23-10	16–10
Penalties-Yards	76-654	71-586
Avg per game	54.5	48.8

	USC	Opp
Punts-Yards	62-2594	63–2460
Avg per punt	41.8	39.0
Time of possession/Game	30:54	29:06
3rd down conversions	67/173	63/172
4th down conversions	10/19	6/19
Touchdowns scored	30	29
Field goals-Attempts	17-20	14–21
PAT-Attempts	28-30	27–28
Attendance	527,580	407,469
Games/Avg per Game	7/75,369	5/81,494

=== Offense ===
==== Rushing ====
Name	GP-GS	Att	Gain	Loss	Net	Avg	TD	Long	Avg/G
Kenny Miles	12-6	111	616	14	602	5.4	1	26	50.2
Brian Maddox	12-5	100	324	19	305	3.0	5	14	25.4
Jarvis Giles	9-0	52	298	21	277	5.3	1	38	30.8
Stephen Garcia	12-12	105	372	242	130	1.2	4	21	10.8
Moe Brown	11-11	5	105	0	105	21.0	0	50	9.5
Bryce Sherman	11-1	7	58	4	54	7.7	0	23	4.9
Patrick DiMarco	12-8	10	31	0	31	3.1	0	7	2.6
Stephon Gilmore	12-12	5	20	0	20	4.0	0	8	1.7
Total		409	1860	360	1500	3.7	11	50	125.0
Opponents		431	1956	312	1644	3.8	15	61	137.0

==== Passing ====
Name	GP-GS	Effic	Cmp-Att-Int	Pct	Yds	TD	Lng	Avg/G
Stephen Garcia	12-12	124.5	223-394-9	56.6	2733	17	80	227.8
Reid McCollum	2-0	176.3	4-6-0	66.7	39	1	20	19.5
Total		125.8	228-402-9	56.7	2811	18	80	234.2
Opponents		114.1	183-327-6	56.0	2012	10	69	167.7

==== Receiving ====
Name	GP-GS	No.	Yds	Avg	TD	Long	Avg/G
Alshon Jeffery	12-6	43	735	17.1	6	80	61.2
Moe Brown	11-11	32	479	15.0	3	69	43.5
Weslye Saunders	11-9	30	360	12.0	3	30	32.7
Tori Gurley	12-5	28	426	15.2	2	44	35.5
Jason Barnes	12-6	24	266	11.1	0	22	22.2
Brian Maddox	12-5	17	135	7.9	2	24	11.2
Kenny Miles	12-6	17	114	6.7	0	20	9.5
Patrick DiMarco	12-8	14	78	5.6	1	15	6.5
D.L. Moore	12-0	6	61	10.2	1	35	5.1
Jarvis Giles	9-0	5	26	5.2	0	12	2.9
Dion Lecorn	6-0	4	27	6.8	0	13	4.5
Total		228	2811	12.3	18	80	234.2
Opponents		183	2012	11.0	10	69	167.7

=== Defense ===
Name	GP	Tackles				Sacks	Pass defense		Interceptions				Fumbles		Blkd Kick
Name	GP	Solo	Ast	Total	TFL-Yds	No-Yds	BrUp	QBH	No.-Yds	Avg	TD	Long	Rcv-Yds	FF	Blkd Kick
Total		505	264	769	77-269	27-172	44	29	6-113	18.8	1	54	10-23	13	4

=== Special teams ===
Name	Punting								Kickoffs				
Name	No.	Yds	Avg	Long	TB	FC	I20	Blkd	No.	Yds	Avg	TB	OB
Spencer Lanning	62	2594	41.8	56	8	18	15	0	9	437	48.6	0	1
Adam Yates									48	2963	61.7	1	2
Total	62	2594	41.8	56	8	18	15	0	57	3400	59.6	1	3

Name	Punt returns					Kick returns				
Name	No.	Yds	Avg	TD	Long	No.	Yds	Avg	TD	Long
Chris Culliver						26	585	22.5	0	61
Bryce Sherman						19	409	21.5	0	35
Stephon Gilmore	13	148	11.4	0	35					
Akeem Auguste	6	17	2.8	0	13	1	15	15.0	0	15
Total	21	177	8.4	0	35	49	1056	21.6	0	61

== Coaching staff ==
- Steve Spurrier – Head Coach
- Ellis Johnson – Assistant Head Coach & Defense Assistant Coach
- Lorenzo Ward – Defensive Coordinator & Safeties
- Shane Beamer – Cornerbacks/Special Teams & Recruiting Coordinator
- Jay Graham – Running Backs
- Johnson Hunter – Tight Ends
- Brad Lawing – Defensive Line
- G. A. Mangus – Quarterbacks
- Steve Spurrier Jr. – Wide Receivers
- Eric Wolford – Offensive Line
- Craig Fitzgerald – Strength
