= Jarvis Giles =

American football player (born 1990)

No. 3
- Position: Running back

Personal information
- Born: January 15, 1990 (age 36); Tampa, Florida, U.S.
- Listed height: 5 ft 11 in (1.80 m)
- Listed weight: 186 lb (84 kg)

Career information
- High school: Gaither (Tampa)
- College: South Carolina (2009−2010); Louisville (2010)

Awards and highlights
- SEC Freshman of the Week (Week 3, 2009)
- Stats at ESPN

Jarvis Giles (born January 15, 1990) is an American former college football running back. After graduating from Gaither High School in 2008, Giles committed to South Carolina for 2009. In Week 3 of 2009 against Florida Atlantic, Giles led the Gamecocks with 113 yards rushing and a touchdown, earning him Southeastern Conference Freshman of the Week, making him the second Gamecock to be honored by the SEC in 2009 (behind Devin Taylor). In 2010, after the emergence of Marcus Lattimore, Giles transferred to Louisville. Giles stated that he had considered transferring to a school closer to his hometown, and a year later, Giles considered transferring to USF.

== College statistics ==
			Rushing					Receiving		
Year	Team	GP/GS	Att	Yards	Avg	Long	TDs	Rec	Yards	TDs
2009	South Carolina	13/9	52	277	5.3	38	1	5	27	0
2010	South Carolina	1/0	2	12	6.0	8	0	0	0	0
