= Ronnie Wingo =

American football player (born 1991)

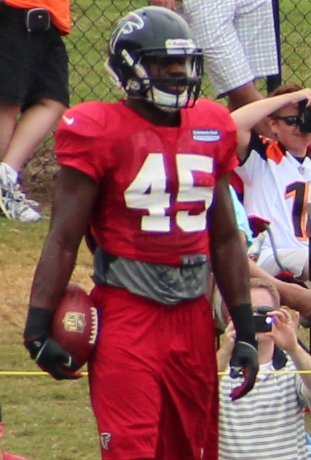
- Wingo with the Atlanta Falcons

No. 27
- Position: Running back

Personal information
- Born: February 18, 1991 (age 35); St. Louis, Missouri, U.S.
- Listed height: 6 ft 3 in (1.91 m)
- Listed weight: 231 lb (105 kg)

Career information
- High school: St. Louis University (St. Louis, Missouri)
- College: Arkansas (2009–2012)
- NFL draft: 2013: undrafted

Career history
- Atlanta Falcons (2013)*; Buffalo Bills (2013−2014); Atlanta Falcons (2014−2015)*; Hamilton Tiger-Cats (2015−2016)*
- * Offseason or practice squad member only

Career NFL statistics
- Rushing yards: 4
- Receptions: 1
- Receiving yards: 2
- Stats at Pro Football Reference

Ronnie Irving Wingo Jr. (born February 18, 1991) is an American football running back. He played college football at Arkansas. He has also been a member of the Atlanta Falcons and Buffalo Bills. He was also a former Assistant Coach for the Affton High School freshman football team.

== Early life ==
He attended St. Louis University High School in St. Louis, Missouri. He was selected to the U.S. Army All-American Bowl West team and was selected to the first-team Class 6A all-state team. He rushed for 4,449 yards and scored 48 touchdowns in high school.

== College career ==
Wingo attended the University of Arkansas from 2009 to 2012.

In his freshman season, he rushed for 319 yards on 49 carries (6.5 avg) and 3 rushing touchdowns. He also recorded 5 receptions, for 99 yards and one touchdown.

In his sophomore season, he rushed for 253 yards on 41 carries (6.2 avg) and one touchdown. He recorded a career-high 27 receptions, for 274 yards receiving yards and 4 touchdowns.

In his junior season, he rushed for a career best 458 yards on 104 carries (4.4 avg) and one touchdown. He also recorded 20 receptions, for 187 yards and 2 touchdowns.

In his senior season, he rushed for 59 yards on 12 carries (4.9 avg) and one touchdown. He also recorded 7 receptions for 50 yards.

== Professional career ==
=== Atlanta Falcons (first stint) ===
On April 27, 2013, he signed with the Atlanta Falcons as undrafted free agent following the 2013 NFL draft.

=== Buffalo Bills ===
On September 2, 2013, he signed with the Buffalo Bills to the practice squad. Due to C. J. Spiller being hurt and the Bills released Brandon Burton he was signed off the practice squad to be the third string running back. The Bills released Wingo on August 25, 2014.

=== Atlanta Falcons (second stint) ===
Wingo was signed to the Falcons' practice squad on December 23, 2014. He was released by the Falcons on May 1, 2015.

=== Hamilton Tiger-Cats ===
After a series of injuries, Ronnie Wingo was added to the Hamilton Tiger-Cats' practice roster on September 1, 2015. On April 15, 2016, Wingo was offered a new contract for the 2016 season.

== Personal life ==
He is the son of Ronnie, Sr. and Tiffany Wingo. His major while at College was sociology. As of 2013, he was 6 feet 2 inches, approximately 231 pounds with a speed of 4.47. His younger brother, Ryan Wingo is a wide receiver for the Texas Longhorns.
