= 2009 Vanderbilt Commodores football team =

American college football season

2009 Vanderbilt Commodores football
- Conference: Southeastern Conference
- Eastern Division
- Record: 2–10 (0–8 SEC)
- Head coach: Bobby Johnson (8th season)
- Offensive coordinator: Ted Cain (8th season)
- Offensive scheme: Multiple
- Defensive coordinator: Jamie Bryant (1st season)
- Base defense: 4–3
- Captain: 3: Patrick Benoist; Ryan Hamilton; Bradley Vierling
- Home stadium: Vanderbilt Stadium

2009 Southeastern Conference football standings
	Conf.			Overall
Team	W		L	W		L
Eastern Division
No. 3 Florida x%	8	–	0	13	–	1
Georgia	4	–	4	8	–	5
Tennessee	4	–	4	7	–	6
Kentucky	3	–	5	7	–	6
South Carolina	3	–	5	7	–	6
Vanderbilt	0	–	8	2	–	10
Western Division
No. 1 Alabama x$#	8	–	0	14	–	0
No. 17 LSU	5	–	3	9	–	4
No. 20 Ole Miss	4	–	4	9	–	4
Arkansas	3	–	5	8	–	5
Auburn	3	–	5	8	–	5
Mississippi State	3	–	5	5	–	7
Championship: Alabama 32, Florida 13
# – BCS National Champion; $ – BCS representative as conference champion; % – BCS at-large representative; x – Division champion/co-champions; Rankings from AP Poll

The 2009 Vanderbilt Commodores football team represented Vanderbilt University during the 2009–10 college football season. The team's head coach was Bobby Johnson, who served his eighth season as the Commodores' head coach. Vanderbilt has been a member of the Southeastern Conference (SEC) since the league's inception in 1932, and has participated in that conference's Eastern Division since its formation in 1992. The Commodores played their six home games at Vanderbilt Stadium at Dudley Field in Nashville, Tennessee, which has been Vanderbilt football's home stadium since 1922. The Commodores finished the season 2–10 and 0–8 in SEC play.

== Coaching staff ==
- Bobby Johnson – Head coach
- Ted Cain – Offensive coordinator and tight ends coach
- Bruce Fowler – Defensive coordinator
- Robbie Caldwell – Assistant head coach/offensive line coach
- Rick Logo – Defensive line coach
- Warren Belin – Linebackers coach and recruiting coordinator
- Jamie Bryant – Defensive backs coach and special teams coordinator
- Charlie Fisher – Co-passing game coordinator & wide receivers
- Jimmy Kiser – Co-passing game coordinator & quarterbacks
- Desmond Kitchings – Running backs coach
- Michael Hazel – Assistant director of football operations
- Joey Orck – Offensive quality control
- Andy Frank – Defensive quality control
- Norval McKenzie – Offensive graduate assistant
- Mark Moehring – Defensive graduate assistant
- Tom Bossung – Head athletic trainer
- Brian Reese – Associate director of student athletics
- John Sisk – Director of speed, strength and conditioning
- Luke Wyatt – Head equipment manager
- Gary Veach – Assistant equipment manager

== Schedule ==
Date	Time	Opponent	Site	TV	Result	Attendance
September 5	6:30 p.m.	Western Carolina*	Vanderbilt Stadium; Nashville, TN	CSS	W 45–0	36,350
September 12	6:00 p.m.	at No. 11 LSU	Tiger Stadium; Baton Rouge, LA	ESPNU	L 9–23	91,566
September 19	6:00 p.m.	Mississippi State	Vanderbilt Stadium; Nashville, TN	FSN	L 3–15	31,840
September 26	7:00 p.m.	at Rice*	Rice Stadium; Houston, TX	CSS	W 36–17	19,753
October 3	6:00 p.m.	No. 21 Ole Miss	Vanderbilt Stadium; Nashville, TN (rivalry)	ESPNU	L 7–23	39,625
October 10	11:00 a.m.	at Army*	Michie Stadium; West Point, NY	CBS College Sports	L 13–16 ^{OT}	34,357
October 17	11:21 a.m.	Georgia^{†}	Vanderbilt Stadium; Nashville, TN (rivalry)	SEC Network	L 10–34	38,340
October 24	6:00 p.m.	at South Carolina	Williams-Brice Stadium; Columbia, SC	ESPNU	L 10–14	75,624
October 31	6:30 p.m.	No. 11 Georgia Tech*	Vanderbilt Stadium; Nashville, TN (rivalry)	CSS	L 31–56	30,262
November 7	6:15 p.m.	at No. 1 Florida	Ben Hill Griffin Stadium; Gainesville, FL	ESPN2	L 3–27	90,694
November 14	11:21 a.m.	Kentucky	Vanderbilt Stadium; Nashville, TN (rivalry)	SEC Network	L 13–24	33,675
November 21	6:00 p.m.	at Tennessee	Neyland Stadium; Knoxville, TN (rivalry)	ESPNU	L 16–31	100,124
*Non-conference game; ^{†}Homecoming; Rankings from AP Poll released week prior to game; All times are in Central time

== Game summaries ==
=== Western Carolina ===
	1	2	3	4	Total
Western Carolina	0	0	0	0	0
Vanderbilt	14	7	7	17	45

=== LSU ===
	1	2	3	4	Total
Vanderbilt	0	7	2	0	9
LSU	7	6	3	7	23

=== Mississippi State ===
	1	2	3	4	Total
Miss. State	0	6	3	6	15
Vanderbilt	0	3	0	0	3

=== Rice ===
	1	2	3	4	Total
Vanderbilt	10	0	10	16	36
Rice	7	3	0	7	17

=== Ole Miss ===
	1	2	3	4	Total
#21 Ole Miss	3	14	6	0	23
Vanderbilt	0	0	7	0	7

=== Army ===
	1	2	3	4	OT	Total
Vanderbilt	0	3	0	10	0	13
Army	0	0	10	3	3	16

=== Georgia ===
	1	2	3	4	Total
Georgia	7	10	3	14	34
Vanderbilt	0	3	7	0	10

=== South Carolina ===
	1	2	3	4	Total
Vanderbilt	0	7	3	0	10
South Carolina	0	7	0	7	14

=== Georgia Tech ===
	1	2	3	4	Total
Yellow Jackets	7	21	14	14	56
Vanderbilt	14	14	3	0	31

=== Florida ===
	1	2	3	4	Total
Vanderbilt	0	0	3	0	3
#1 Florida	3	10	7	7	27

=== Kentucky ===
	1	2	3	4	Total
Kentucky	7	3	7	7	24
Vanderbilt	3	10	0	0	13

=== Tennessee ===
	1	2	3	4	Total
Vanderbilt	3	7	3	3	16
Tennessee	10	14	0	7	31
