= 2009 Georgia Tech Yellow Jackets football team =

American college football season

2009 Georgia Tech Yellow Jackets football

ACC champion (vacated) ACC Coastal Division champion

ACC Championship Game, W 39–34 vs. Clemson (vacated)

Orange Bowl, L 14–24 vs. Iowa
- Conference: Atlantic Coast Conference
- Coastal

Ranking
- Coaches: No. 13
- AP: No. 13
- Record: 10–3, 1 win vacated (7–1 ACC)
- Head coach: Paul Johnson (2nd season)
- Offensive scheme: Flexbone triple option
- Defensive coordinator: Dave Wommack (2nd season)
- Base defense: 4–3
- Home stadium: Bobby Dodd Stadium

2009 Atlantic Coast Conference football standings
	Conf.			Overall
Team	W		L	W		L
Atlantic Division
No. 24 Clemson x	6	–	2	9	–	5
Boston College	5	–	3	8	–	5
Florida State	4	–	4	7	–	6
Wake Forest	3	–	5	5	–	7
NC State	2	–	6	5	–	7
Maryland	1	–	7	2	–	10
Coastal Division
No. 13 Georgia Tech * x$	7	–	1	11	–	3
No. 10 Virginia Tech	6	–	2	10	–	3
No. 19 Miami (FL)	5	–	3	9	–	4
North Carolina *	0	–	4	0	–	5
Duke	3	–	5	5	–	7
Virginia	2	–	6	3	–	9
Championship: Georgia Tech 39, Clemson 34
$ – BCS representative as conference champion; North Carolina vacated 8 wins, including 4 ACC wins.; Rankings from AP Poll

The 2009 Georgia Tech Yellow Jackets football team represented the Georgia Institute of Technology in the 2009 NCAA Division I FBS football season. The team was coached by second year head coach Paul Johnson. Georgia Tech played their home games at Bobby Dodd Stadium at Grant Field in Atlanta.

The Yellow Jackets finished the season 11–3, 7–1 in ACC play, represented the coastal division in the ACC Championship Game where they defeated Atlantic Division champion Clemson 39–34 to earn the ACC's automatic bid to the BCS. The Yellow Jackets would be invited to the FedEx Orange Bowl where they lost 24–14 to Iowa. Later in 2011 the ACC Championship was vacated by the NCAA due to the circumstances surrounding an improper benefits investigation. While some reports indicate that Georgia Tech was ordered to vacate their losses to Georgia and in the Orange Bowl, the losses are still recognized by the school.

== Schedule ==
Date	Time	Opponent	Rank	Site	TV	Result	Attendance
September 5	1:00 pm	No. 21 (FCS) Jacksonville State*	No. 15	Bobby Dodd Stadium; Atlanta, GA	ESPN360	W 37–17	46,131
September 10	7:30 pm	Clemson	No. 15	Bobby Dodd Stadium; Atlanta, GA (rivalry)	ESPN	W 30–27	52,029
September 17	7:30 pm	at No. 20 Miami (FL)	No. 14	Land Shark Stadium; Miami Gardens, FL	ESPN	L 17–33	45,329
September 26	12:00 pm	No. 22 North Carolina		Bobby Dodd Stadium; Atlanta, GA	Raycom	W 24–7	50,114
October 3	7:30 pm	at Mississippi State*	No. 25	Davis Wade Stadium; Starkville, MS	CSS	W 42–31	50,035
October 10	8:00 pm	at Florida State	No. 22	Doak Campbell Stadium; Tallahassee, FL	ESPN2	W 49–44	76,292
October 17	6:00 pm	No. 4 Virginia Tech^{†}	No. 19	Bobby Dodd Stadium; Atlanta, GA (rivalry)	ESPN2	W 28–23	54,405
October 24	12:00 pm	at Virginia	No. 11	Scott Stadium; Charlottesville, VA	Raycom	W 34–9	43,016
October 31	7:30 pm	at Vanderbilt*	No. 11	Vanderbilt Stadium; Nashville, TN (rivalry)	CSS	W 56–31	30,262
November 7	3:30 pm	Wake Forest	No. 10	Bobby Dodd Stadium; Atlanta, GA	ABC/ESPN2	W 30–27 ^{OT}	51,415
November 14	12:00 pm	at Duke	No. 7	Wallace Wade Stadium; Durham, NC	ESPN2	W 49–10	25,899
November 28	8:00 pm	Georgia*	No. 7	Bobby Dodd Stadium; Atlanta, GA (Clean, Old-Fashioned Hate)	ABC/ESPN2	L 24–30	55,407
December 5	8:00 pm	vs. No. 25 Clemson	No. 12	Raymond James Stadium; Tampa, FL (ACC Championship Game)	ESPN	W 39–34 (vacated)	57,227
January 5	8:00 pm	vs. No. 10 Iowa*	No. 9	Land Shark Stadium; Miami Gardens, FL (Orange Bowl)	FOX	L 14–24	66,131
*Non-conference game; ^{†}Homecoming; Rankings from AP Poll released prior to the game; All times are in Eastern time

== Rankings ==
Ranking movements Legend: ██ Increase in ranking ██ Decrease in ranking RV = Received votes
	Week															
Poll	Pre	1	2	3	4	5	6	7	8	9	10	11	12	13	14	Final
AP	15	15	14	RV	25	22	19	11	11	10	7	7	7	12	9	13
Coaches	15	13	13	RV	RV	23	20	13	11	11	7	7	7	11	10	13
Harris	Not released				RV	22	20	13	12	11	7	7	7	11	10	Not released
BCS	Not released							12	11	10	7	7	7	10	9	Not released

== Preseason ==
The 2009 squad returns ACC Player of the Year and All-American B-Back Jonathan Dwyer, Quarterback Josh Nesbitt, A-Back Roddy Jones, WR Demaryius Thomas, and the entire offensive line from the bowl game. Tech adds Louisville transfer Anthony Allen to the backfield. On defense, Tech returns eight of eleven starters including All-ACC players Morgan Burnett and Derrick Morgan. Tech returns nineteen starters to a squad that defeated three ranked teams in 2008. Johnson signed a recruiting class of 21 players.

== Game summaries ==
=== Jacksonville State ===
	1	2	3	4	Total
Gamecocks	0	7	0	10	17
#15 Yellow Jackets	17	14	0	6	37

GT vs. Jacksonville State Gamecocks

Georgia Tech rushed for nearly 300 yards behind Jonathan Dwyer's 96 yards on just 7 carries. On the first play of the season, the former ACC Player of the Year took a Josh Nesbitt pitch 74 yards down the sideline for a touchdown. Dwyer was untouched on the carry. The B-Back, Tech's feature back in the offense, carried the ball six more times in the game, finishing with seven carries. Josh Nesbitt connected on a touchdown with Anthony Allen. In Tech's home opener, Demaryius "BayBay" Thomas posted a 100-yard receiving performance, catching the ball four times for 101 yards. All-American candidate Morgan Burnett listed an interception, his first of 2009 and 11th of his career. Coach Johnson earned his 10th win at Georgia Tech.

=== Clemson ===
	1	2	3	4	Total
Tigers	0	7	14	6	27
#14 Yellow Jackets	21	3	0	6	30

GT vs. Clemson Tigers

Georgia Tech earned a second half scare by Clemson. However, Scott Blair connected on three field goals for the Yellow Jackets to seal the win. Tech scored on three plays in the first half. Louisville transfer Anthony Allen took a Josh Nesbitt pitch 82 yards down the sideline to score Tech's first touchdown on its opening possession. Jerrard Tarrant returned a punt 65 yards to increase the Tech lead to 14–0. Following a Scott Blair field goal, Tech on its ensuing possession marched the ball downfield only to have itself stopped. On 4th down, Tech ran onto the field with its kicking unit, but instead of kicking the field goal, Blair took the snap, finding "BayBay" Thomas down the sideline, earning a 40-yard touchdown score for the White and Gold. While Tech led 24–7 at the half, the Tech defense gave up 27 unanswered points. Clemson took the lead 27–24 in the 4th quarter. Tech, who was 0–9 on third down attempts early in the 4th, converted three in a row late in the 4th quarter with Josh Nesbitt earning two consecutive field goals. Anthony Allen ran for 127 yards on 5 carries, 25.4 yards per carry. The Tech Defense intercepted Kyle Parker twice.

=== Miami ===
	1	2	3	4	Total
#14 Yellow Jackets	3	0	7	7	17
#20 Hurricanes	7	10	16	0	33

GT at Miami Hurricanes

Georgia Tech traveled to Land Shark Stadium in Miami Gardens, Florida to compete against the University of Miami. Offensive Coordinator Mark Whipple and Miami Quarterback Jacory Harris prepared a game plan against Dave Wommack and the Georgia Tech Defense. Miami threw the ball for 300 yards. Tech managed to run for only 180 yards, and it earned merely 250 yards of total offense. Josh Nesbitt and Demaryius Thomas hooked up for a touchdown late in the game. On just Tech's third possession of the game, a 40-yard Roddy Jones touchdown was nullified on a block in the back call by walk-on Kevin Cone. The crucial call nullified a 14–10 score midway through the second quarter. The Tech offense stalled out on the same drive, attempting a 40-yard field goal which was missed by PK Scott Blair.

=== North Carolina ===
	1	2	3	4	Total
#18 Tar Heels	0	0	0	7	7
Yellow Jackets	7	3	0	14	24

GT vs. UNC Tarheels

Georgia Tech bounced back the following week in Atlanta against the University of North Carolina. Butch Davis and the Tar Heels came in ranked in the Top 20. The Tech defense held North Carolina to just 154 yards of total offense, including only 17 on the ground. The Tech offense, led by Jonathan Dwyer, rushed for 317 yards. Josh Nesbitt showed improvement in the air, earning a completion % of 60. He connected with Demaryius "BayBay" Thomas for a touchdown. Jonathan Dwyer finished with 157 yards on 17 carries. Josh Nesbitt ran for two touchdowns and Roddy Jones ran one in from 13.

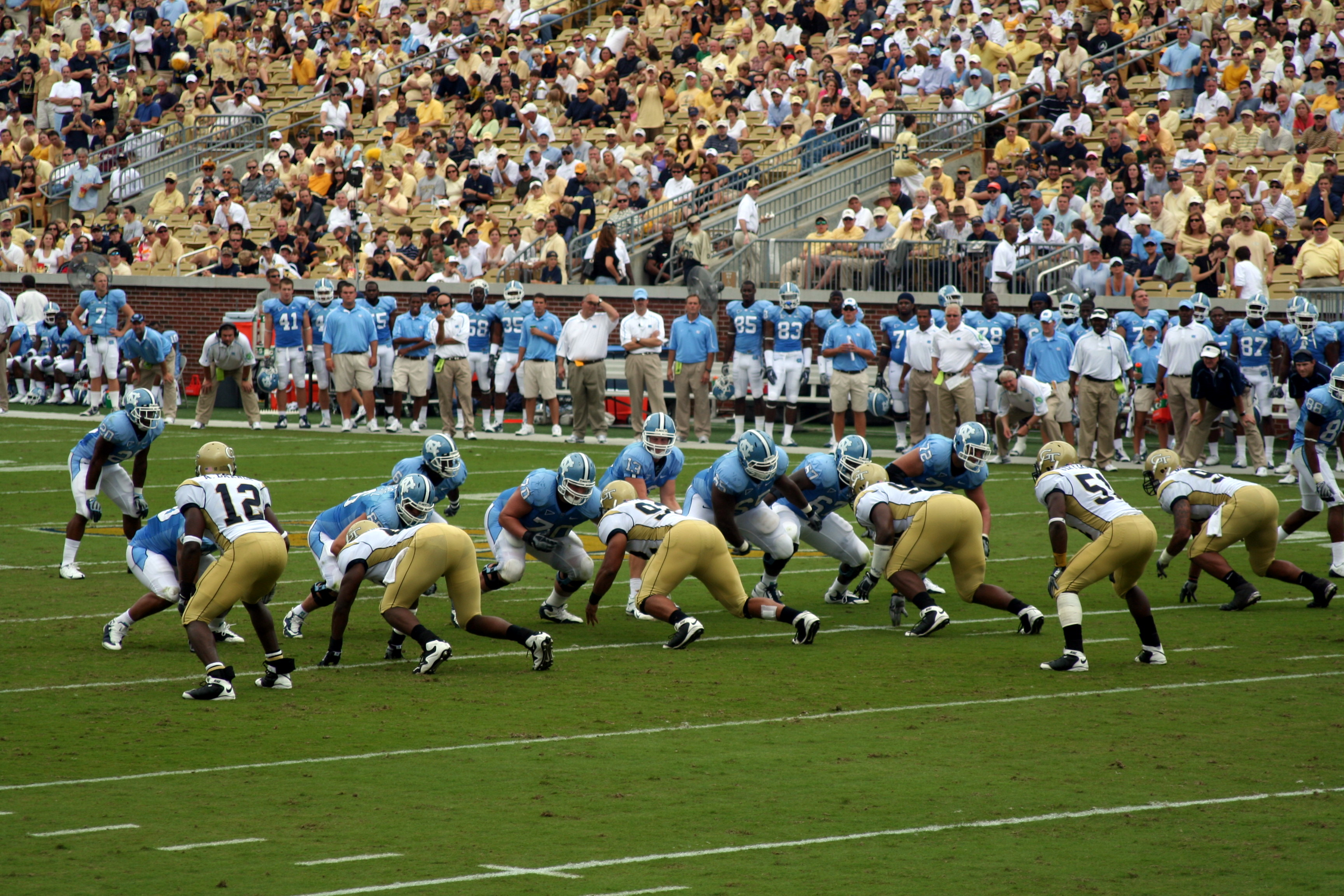

=== Mississippi State ===
	1	2	3	4	Total
No. 25 Yellow Jackets	14	14	7	7	42
Bulldogs	7	10	0	14	31

GT at Mississippi State Bulldogs

Georgia Tech was 2–0 against Mississippi State University in the all-time series going into the October 3 contest between the two schools. On the first possession of the game, former Tulsa DE and current Georgia Tech End Anthony Egbuniwe sacked MSU QB Tyson Lee, stripping the ball from Lee's possession and gaining possession for Georgia Tech. Stephen Hill took a 30-yard reverse to the house on Tech's opening drive. Josh Nesbitt threw 266 yards on 11 of 14 completions and a touchdown. Nesbitt led the Tech offense all the way to MSU's goal line on its second possession with his throwing. Jonathan Dwyer ran the ball in from two yards to improve the Tech lead to 14–0. MSU responded with a 98-yard kickoff return for a touchdown. Tech was slated to go up 21–7 when Jonathan Dwyer fumbled the ball around Tech's goal line and MSU recovered, earning a touchback and possession of the football. On the ensuing drive, Lee and Anthony Dixon fumbled; DB Jerrard Tarrant picked it up, returning it 35 yards to the house. Tech won the contest by a score of 42–31. The Tech defense gave up 497 yards of total offense.

=== Florida State ===
	1	2	3	4	Total
#22 Yellow Jackets	14	14	14	7	49
Seminoles	14	21	3	6	44

GT at Florida State Seminoles

Georgia Tech ran for 401 yards en route to defeating Florida State 49–44 at Doak Campbell Stadium in Tallahassee, Florida. Tech had never defeated the Seminoles in Tallahassee previously. Jonathan Dwyer ran for a couple scores, one of which was a 69-yard memorable dart downfield on the first play of Tech's third possession. A-Backs Anthony Allen, Marcus Wright, and Embry Peeples posted stellar games. Allen took a pitch 60 yards down the sideline on Tech's second drive to set up Josh Nesbitt for a one-yard touchdown. Tech had four possessions in the first half, scoring on each of them. It finished with 49 points. Nesbitt added two more touchdowns, the final coming late in 4th quarter. On the game-winning drive, Roddy Jones dropped a Josh Nesbitt pitch, and FSU picked it up, maintaining possession. However, Nesbitt used both of his hands to take the football back before the FSU player was down, regaining possession for Tech. Nesbitt later scored on a 25-yard scamper that same drive, sealing victory for the White and Gold. The epic scamper increased the Tech lead to 11 at 49–38. While the Tech Offense posted a career day, the Tech defense struggled. It gave up 550 yards of total offense, 408 coming in the first half. Christian Ponder had a career day, throwing for five touchdowns. FSU punted once all game, Tech never punted. Paul Johnson and his spread option offense posted its third 400 plus yard rushing performance at Georgia Tech. The other two came in Johnson's first season at Tech, against Miami (FL) in Atlanta and Georgia in Athens.

"We simply could not stop them." - Bobby Bowden

=== Virginia Tech ===
	1	2	3	4	Total
#4 Hokies	0	3	7	13	23
#19 Yellow Jackets	0	7	14	7	28

GT vs. Virginia Tech Hokies

Josh Nesbitt scored three touchdowns and Georgia Tech ran for 306 yards to upset #4 Virginia Tech on a cold, memorable night in Atlanta. For the second straight week, head coach Paul Johnson led the #19 Yellow Jacket squad to a victory, earning a win that ended a 17-game losing skid to top five opponents played at Bobby Dodd Stadium since 1962. Jason Peters batted down and intercepted Tyrod Taylor in the 1st quarter. Josh Nesbitt ran in a couple scores from inside the five, and Sophomore Marcus Wright scored from 13 yards out in the third quarter to increase the Tech lead to 11. The Georgia Tech Defense played effectively, limiting an elusive Tyrod Taylor and the Virginia Tech offense to only 342 yards of total offense. Taylor scored on a 3rd quarter scamper. However, on 3rd and 7 with 3:02 remaining in the final quarter, Josh Nesbitt had a 33-yard game icing stiff arm and score to increase the Tech lead to 28–16. Following the announcement of a 28–23 final tally, Grant Field was swarmed. Steven Sylvester and Derrick Morgan each recorded a sack. Jonathan Dwyer and Anthony Allen combined for 150 yards on the ground to set up Josh Nesbitt and the Georgia Tech offense. The win over Frank Beamer's #4 Hokies improved Paul Johnson's record to 10–1 at home.

"...with the caliber of players they have – Nesbitt is unbelievable, they've got Dwyer – it's just exhausting." - Torrian Gray

=== Virginia ===
	1	2	3	4	Total
#11 Yellow Jackets	3	10	7	14	34
Cavaliers	3	3	0	3	9

GT at Virginia Cavaliers

Georgia Tech defeated Virginia in Charlottesville, Virginia for the first time since 1990 by a score of 34–9. Tech had two 100 yard rushers in the game. Jonathan Dwyer led the team with 125 yards while Anthony Allen followed with 111 yards and two touchdowns. Josh Nesbitt ran in two touchdowns from inside the five. Redshirt Freshman Malcolm Munroe forced a fumble by Virginia punt returner Chase Minnifield. The Tech offense accumulated 447 yards of total offense. The Tech Defense held Virginia to 198 yards. ...Tech's time of possession today was the highest in at least 20 years; the next closest in the last 20 years was 42:10 vs. Wake Forest on September 14, 1996, and 42:06 vs. North Carolina earlier this season ... Tech had two 100-yard rushers in a game for the second time this season ... Tech had over 400 yards total offense for the sixth time this season ... Tech rushed for more than 300 yards for the sixth time this season ... Georgia Tech has outscored opponents 79–31 in the first quarter this season ... When Tech's fake punt in the first quarter failed, it ended a streak of six consecutive fourth-down conversions; it was the Jackets' first failed fourth-down attempt since September 17 (vs. Clemson) ... Georgia Tech attempted its first field goal since September 26 (vs. North Carolina) ... 139 consecutive games without returning a kickoff for a touchdown ... 27 consecutive starts by senior guard Cord Howard ... back-up DT Jason Peters (r-So.) did not travel to Virginia (sick)

=== Vanderbilt ===
	1	2	3	4	Total
#11 Yellow Jackets	7	21	14	14	56
Commodores	14	14	3	0	31

GT at Vanderbilt Commodores

Paul Johnson and his #11 ranked Georgia Tech Yellow Jackets will travel to Nashville, Tenn. to compete against Vanderbilt University on Halloween night, 2009. Tech leads the series with the Commodores 18–15–3 in 36 contests. Tech comes in averaging nearly 295 yards on the ground. Tech holds a #11 ranking in the AP, Coaches', and BCS polls, its highest mark since 1998. A win over Bobby Johnson and the Commodores could mean Tech's highest ranking since 2001.

Jonathan Dwyer rushed for a career-high 186 yards and three touchdowns while Josh Nesbitt added 2 touchdowns on the ground and 2 in the air as Georgia Tech routed Vanderbilt 56–31 in Nashville, Tenn. Vanderbilt led 31–28 with twelve minutes left in the 3rd quarter, but a series of turnovers allowed Georgia Tech's high powered offense to score four more touchdowns. Josh Nesbitt threw an 87-yard touchdown to sophomore Embry Peeples in the 4th quarter to increase the Tech lead to 18 at 49–31. The win marked Tech's fourth victory on the road, its most since 2000. It also elevated the Jackets to a #10 BCS ranking, its highest ranking in November since 1990. Paul Johnson posted his fifth 400 plus yard rushing attack at Georgia Tech, as the Yellow Jackets ran up and down Nashville, Tenn. for 404 yards.

"There is no way to figure it out." – Bobby Johnson

=== Wake Forest ===
	1	2	3	4	OT	Total
Demon Deacons	0	17	0	7	3	27
#10 Yellow Jackets	10	0	7	7	6	30

GT vs. Wake Forest Demon Deacons

The Yellow Jackets, ranked in the Top 10 for the first time since 1999, hosted the Demon Deacons in Atlanta. The game got off to a quick start as Tech jumped out to a quick 10–0 lead helped by Preston Lyons first career TD. But the Deacons controlled the rest of the first half scoring 17 unanswered points. The Yellow Jackets kept committing penalties, contributing to all of Wake Forest's points. The offense also had its share of mistakes, getting called three times for chop blocks as the officials seemed to pay close attention to the interior line after opponents complained of dirty blocking tactics. After trailing 17–10 at the half, Tech's Jonathan Dwyer broke off a 59-yard TD run on Georgia Tech's first offensive snap of the second half, tying the game at 17. Wake Forest managed only one first down on its four possessions after halftime, and Georgia Tech went ahead 24–17 when Josh Nesbitt scored on a 12-yard run with 8:19 left in regulation. Wake Forest QB Riley Skinner drove the Deacons down late in the 4th quarter and threw an 11-yard touchdown pass to Devon Brown with 4:27 remaining. After Georgia Tech was stopped again on fourth down, Wake Forest appeared to be driving into range for a winning field-goal attempt. But Skinner was sacked by Derrick Morgan on third-and-7 from the Georgia Tech 35, and Wake Forest decided to punt it away and settle for OT. In the first period of OT, the Yellow Jacket defense was able to hold Wake Forest to a field goal helped by a Derrick Morgan sack on Riley Skinner on a 3rd and seven. On the Jacket's OT possession, Georgia Tech drove to the 5 where it faced fourth-and-less-than-a-yard. The Yellow Jackets initially tried to draw Wake offsides, but was forced to burn a timeout when that didn't work. Deciding to go for the first instead of kicking a field goal, Josh Nesbitt got the first down on a QB sneak. On the very next play, the Jackets were able to get into the endzone thanks to another Josh Nesbitt sneak and was able to seal the victory. The victory lifted Tech to a 9–1 record and dropped the Deacons to 4–6. The Yellow Jacket offense, also known as the Nesbone, rumbled up and down Grant Field for 412 yards, Coach Johnson's sixth 400 plus rushing yard performance in two seasons.

=== Duke ===
	1	2	3	4	Total
#7 Yellow Jackets	7	21	14	7	49
Blue Devils	10	0	0	0	10

GT at Duke Blue Devils

Georgia Tech surged to the top of the ACC Coastal division behind the performance of All American Tailback Jonathan Dwyer, who carried the ball 14 times for 110 yards and two touchdowns. Josh Nesbitt connected with true Freshman Stephen Hill and veteran Junior Demaryius "BayBay" Thomas for a couple of scores en route to a 49–10 romp of Duke University at Wallace Wade Stadium in Durham, North Carolina The Yellow Jacket defense allowed 10 points early before shutting out the Blue Devil Offense the remainder of the game. Junior Defensive Tackle Ben Anderson received ACC Defensive Lineman of the Week honors after his dominating performance in the trenches recording 2 sacks, 3 tackles for loss and 5 tackles. The Yellow Jacket offense was the story of the game after falling behind 10–0 in the first quarter. The high powered triple option offense scored forty nine consecutive points to wrap up the Coastal Division for Paul Johnson and the Yellow Jackets.

=== Georgia ===
	1	2	3	4	Total
Bulldogs	7	10	10	3	30
#7 Yellow Jackets	0	3	14	7	24

GT vs. Georgia Bulldogs

Georgia Tech was outgained by the Bulldogs both rushing (349–209) and time of possession, which had been key components to the Yellow Jackets' success throughout the season. Georgia tailbacks Washaun Ealey and Caleb King both had breakout performances, running for 183 and 166 yards, respectively, both career highs. Georgia Tech had a chance to take the lead late in the game, but Demaryius Thomas dropped a pass on fourth down which would have resulted in a first down, securing Georgia's 30–24 victory. This game dropped Georgia Tech's record against Georgia coach Mark Richt to 1–8.

=== ACC Championship Game ===
ACC Championship Game
#10 Georgia Tech vs. Clemson

Team	1	2	3	4	Total
• Georgia Tech	3	13	17	6	39
Clemson	7	6	7	14	34

- Date: December 5
- Location: Raymond James Stadium, Tampa, Florida
- Game start: 8:00 p.m. EST

Scoring summary
1	11:24	CLEM	C.J. Spiller 3 yard run (Richard Jackson kick)	CLEM 7-0
1	7:30	GT	Scott Blair 48 yard field goal	CLEM 7-3
2	13:30	GT	Jonathan Dwyer 4 yard run (Scott Blair kick)	GT 10-7
2	5:35	GT	Scott Blair 49 yard field goal	GT 13-7
2	2:55	CLEM	C.J. Spiller 41 yard run (run failed)	Tied 13-13
2	0:06	GT	Scott Blair 28 yard field goal	GT 16-13
3	9:12	GT	Josh Nesbitt 13 yard run (Scott Blair kick)	GT 23-13
3	6:39	CLEM	C.J. Spiller 36 yard run (Richard Jackson kick)	GT 23-20
3	5:10	GT	Demaryius Thomas 70 yard pass from Josh Nesbitt (Scott Blair kick)	GT 30-20
3	1:11	GT	Scott Blair 40 yard field goal	GT 33-20
4	12:00	CLEM	C.J. Spiller 9 yard run (Richard Jackson kick)	GT 33-27
4	6:11	CLEM	Andre Ellington 1 yard run (Richard Jackson kick)	CLEM 34-33
4	1:20	GT	Jonathan Dwyer 15 yard run (run failed)	GT 39-34

Georgia Tech defeated Clemson 39–34 to win the ACC conference championship game.

Georgia Tech was forced to vacate this game and their ACC championship on July 14, 2011, due to NCAA sanctions.

=== Orange Bowl ===
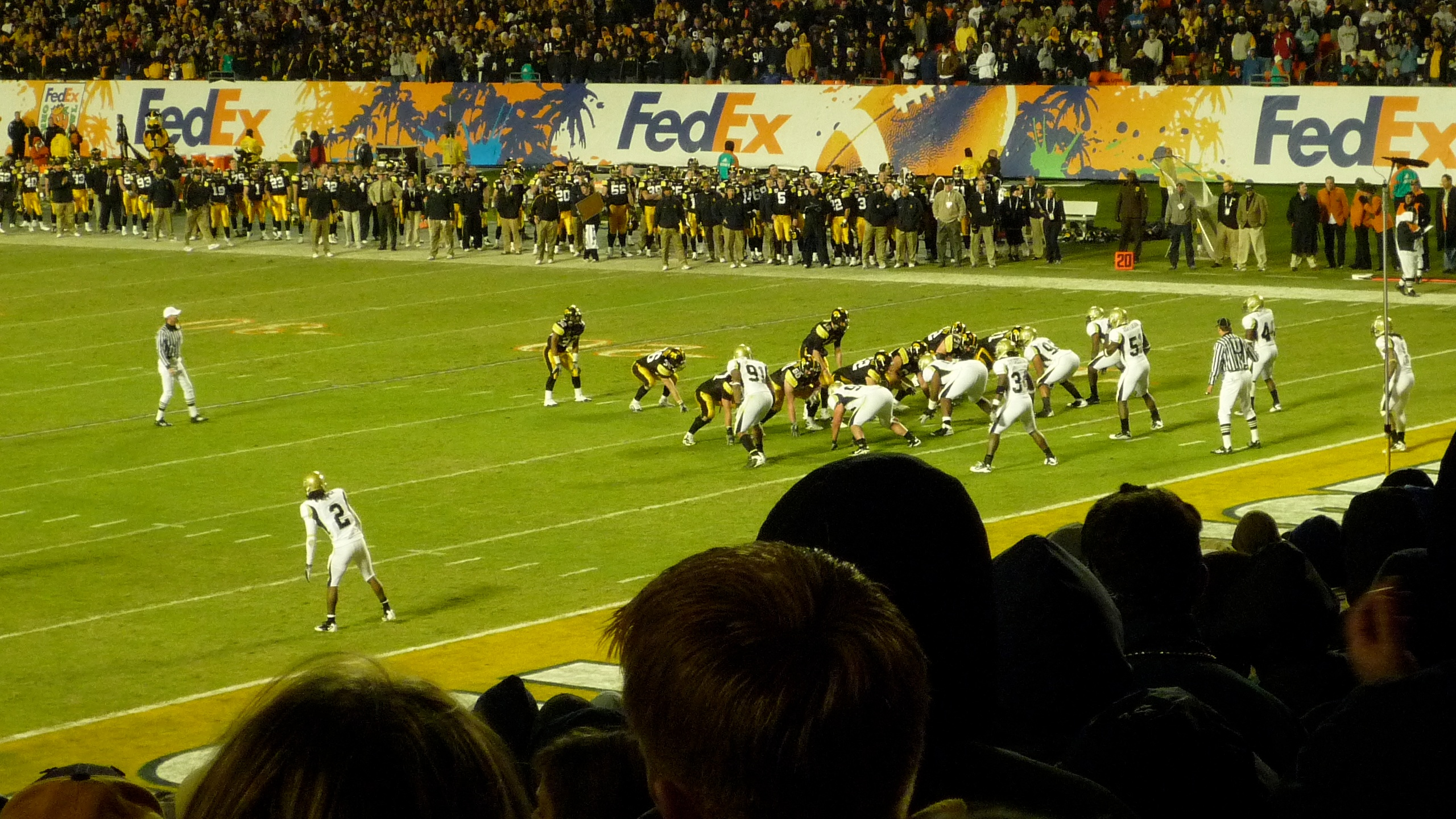
Iowa offense lines up against Georgia Tech defense in the 2010 Orange Bowl

	1	2	3	4	Total
#10 Hawkeyes	14	0	3	7	24
#9 Yellow Jackets	7	0	0	7	14

GT vs. Iowa Hawkeyes

== Depth chart ==
Defense

FS
Dominique Reese
Jon Lockhart

WLB	MLB	SLB
⋅	Brad Jefferson	⋅
Sed Griffin	AT Barnes	⋅

SS
Morgan Burnett
Jemea Thomas

CB
Roderick Sweeting
Martin Frierson

DE	DT	DT	DE
Anthony Egbuniwe	Logan Walls	Ben Anderson	Derrick Morgan
Izaan Cross	T. J. Barnes	Jason Peters	Robert Hall

CB
Mario Butler
Rashad Reid

Offense

WR
Demaryius Thomas
Kevin Cone

SB
Roddy Jones
Embry Peeples

LT	LG	C	RG	RT
Brad Sellers	Joseph Gilbert	Sean Bedford	Cord Howard	Austin Barrick
Nick Claytor	Omoregie Uzzi	Dan Voss	Zach Krish	Phil Smith

SB
Anthony Allen
Marcus Wright

WR
Stephen Hill
Quentin Sims

QB
Josh Nesbitt
Jaybo Shaw

FB
Jonathan Dwyer
Preston Lyons

Special teams
PK Chris Tanner
PK Scott Blair
P Chandler Anderson
P Kevin Crosby
KR Orwin Smith
PR Jerrard Tarrant
LS Jeff Lentz
H Chandler Anderson
