= 2009 Atlantic Coast Conference football season =

2009 ACC football season
- League: NCAA Division I Football Bowl Subdivision
- Sport: football
- Duration: September 3, 2009 – January 5, 2010
- Teams: 12

Regular season
- Season champions: Georgia Tech
- Season MVP: C. J. Spiller
- Atlantic champions: Clemson
- Coastal champions: Georgia Tech

ACC Championship Game
- Champions: Georgia Tech
- Runners-up: Clemson

ACC seasons
- ← 2008 2010 →

2009 Atlantic Coast Conference football standings
	Conf.			Overall
Team	W		L	W		L
Atlantic Division
No. 24 Clemson x	6	–	2	9	–	5
Boston College	5	–	3	8	–	5
Florida State	4	–	4	7	–	6
Wake Forest	3	–	5	5	–	7
NC State	2	–	6	5	–	7
Maryland	1	–	7	2	–	10
Coastal Division
No. 13 Georgia Tech * x$	7	–	1	11	–	3
No. 10 Virginia Tech	6	–	2	10	–	3
No. 19 Miami (FL)	5	–	3	9	–	4
North Carolina *	0	–	4	0	–	5
Duke	3	–	5	5	–	7
Virginia	2	–	6	3	–	9
Championship: Georgia Tech 39, Clemson 34
$ – BCS representative as conference champion; North Carolina vacated 8 wins, including 4 ACC wins.; Rankings from AP Poll

The 2009 ACC football season was an NCAA football season that was played from September 3, 2009, to January 5, 2010. The Atlantic Coast Conference consists of 12 members in two divisions. The Atlantic division consists of Boston College, Clemson, Florida State, Maryland, North Carolina State and Wake Forest. The Coastal division consists of Duke, Georgia Tech, Miami, North Carolina, Virginia, and Virginia Tech. The division champions met in the 2009 ACC Championship Game, where Georgia Tech defeated Clemson by a score of 39–34. Georgia Tech represented the ACC in the BCS, being invited to the FedEx Orange Bowl where they lost to Iowa. The ACC had a total of seven teams play in a bowl game and finished the bowl season with a record of 3–4.

== Previous season ==
Boston College and Florida State tied for the Atlantic division championship. Boston College beat Florida State during the regular season so they represented the Atlantic division in the 2008 ACC Championship Game. A similar situation occurred in the Coastal division where Virginia Tech and Georgia Tech tied. Virginia Tech won the regular season meeting so they represented the Coastal division in the championship game. Virginia Tech would win the ACC championship game 30-12 over Boston College and would represent the ACC in the FedEx Orange Bowl where they would defeat Cincinnati, the champions of the Big East Conference, 20-7.

The ACC would ultimately send 10 teams to bowl games, the most of any conference in 2008. Boston College (9-5) lost to Vanderbilt 16-14 in the Music City Bowl. Florida State (9-4) beat Wisconsin 42-13 in the Champs Sports Bowl. Georgia Tech (9-4) lost to LSU 38-3 in the Chick-fil-A Bowl. Maryland (8-5) beat Nevada 42-35 in the Roady's Humanitarian Bowl. North Carolina (8-5) lost to West Virginia 31-30 in the Meineke Car Care Bowl. Wake Forest (8-5) beat Navy 29-19 in the EagleBank Bowl. Miami (7-6) lost to California 24-17 in the Emerald Bowl. Clemson (7-6) lost to Nebraska 26-21 in the Konica Minolta Gator Bowl. North Carolina State (6-7) lost to Rutgers 29-23 in the PapaJohns.com Bowl. The only two teams not to go to a bowl game were Virginia (5-7) and Duke (4-8).

== Preseason ==
=== Preseason poll ===
The 2009 ACC preseason poll was announced at the ACC Football Kickoff meetings in Greensboro, North Carolina on July 27. Virginia Tech was voted to win Coastal division and the conference. Florida State was voted to win the Atlantic division. Jonathan Dwyer of Georgia Tech was voted the Preseason ACC Player of the Year.

==== Atlantic Division poll ====
1. Florida State – 499 (56)
2. Clemson – 387 (14)
3. North Carolina State – 364 (10)
4. Wake Forest – 295 (7)
5. Maryland – 157
6. Boston College – 145

==== Coastal Division poll ====
1. Virginia Tech – 512 (78)
2. Georgia Tech – 415 (9)
3. North Carolina – 350
4. Miami – 21
5. Virginia – 148
6. Duke – 120

==== Predicted ACC Championship Game Winner ====
1. Virginia Tech–69
2. Florida State–7
3. Georgia Tech–7
4. Clemson–2
5. North Carolina State–2

=== Preseason All Conference Teams ===
==== Offense ====
QB Russell Wilson- NC State, RB Jonathan Dwyer- Georgia Tech, RB C. J. Spiller- Clemson, WR Demaryius Thomas- Georgia Tech, WR Jacoby Ford- Clemson, TE Greg Boone- Virginia Tech, OT Jason Curtis Fox- Miami, OT Anthony Castonzo- Boston College, OG Sergio Render- Virginia Tech, OG Rodney Hudson- Florida State, C Matt Tennant- Boston College, PK Matt Bosher- Miami.

==== Defense ====
DE Jason Worilds- Virginia Tech, DE Willie Young- NC State, DT Vince Oghobaase- Duke, DT Marvin Austin- North Carolina, LB Dekoda Watson- Florida State, LB Quan Sturdivant- North Carolina, LB Alex Wujciak- Maryland, CB Ras-I Dowling- Virginia, CB Kendric Burney- North Carolina, S Morgan Burnett- Georgia Tech, S Kam Chancellor- Virginia Tech, P Travis Baltz- Maryland, Specialist: C. J. Spiller- Clemson.

=== Award watch lists ===
Award	School	Player
Bronko Nagurski Trophy	Duke	Vince Oghobaase
Bronko Nagurski Trophy	Georgia Tech	Morgan Burnett
Bronko Nagurski Trophy	Maryland	Alex Wujciak
Bronko Nagurski Trophy	North Carolina	Quan Sturdivant
Bronko Nagurski Trophy	North Carolina	Deunta Williams
Bronko Nagurski Trophy	NC State	Willie Young
Bronko Nagurski Trophy	Virginia	Ras-I Dowling
Bronko Nagurski Trophy	Virginia Tech	Kam Chancellor
Bronko Nagurski Trophy	Wake Forest	Boo Robinson
Dave Rimington Trophy	Boston College	Matt Tennant
Dave Rimington Trophy	Duke	Bryan Morgan
Dave Rimington Trophy	Florida State	Ryan McMahon
Dave Rimington Trophy	North Carolina	Lowell Dyer
Dave Rimington Trophy	NC State	Ted Larsen
Lombardi Award	Boston College	Anthony Castonzo
Lombardi Award	Boston College	Matt Tennant
Lombardi Award	Duke	Vince Oghobaase
Lombardi Award	Florida State	Rodney Hudson
Lombardi Award	Florida State	Dekoda Watson
Lombardi Award	Georgia Tech	Derrick Morgan
Lombardi Award	Maryland	Alex Wujciak
Lombardi Award	Miami	Jason Curtis Fox
Lombardi Award	North Carolina	Marvin Austin
Lombardi Award	North Carolina	Quan Sturdivant
Lombardi Award	Virginia Tech	Greg Boone
Lombardi Award	Virginia Tech	Sergio Render
Lombardi Award	Virginia Tech	Jason Worilds
Lombardi Award	Wake Forest	Boo Robinson
Manning Award	Duke	Thaddeus Lewis
Manning Award	North Carolina	Landen Edwards
Manning Award	NC State	Russell Wilson
Manning Award	Wake Forest	Riley Skinner
Maxwell Award	Clemson	C. J. Spiller
Maxwell Award	Georgia Tech	Jonathan Dwyer
Maxwell Award	Maryland	Da'Rel Scott
Maxwell Award	NC State	Russell Wilson
Maxwell Award	Virginia Tech	Darren Evans
Maxwell Award	Virginia Tech	Tyrod Taylor
Lou Groza Award	Duke	Nick Maggio
Lou Groza Award	Miami	Matt Bosher
Lou Groza Award	NC State	Josh Czajkowski
Outland Trophy	Boston College	Matt Tennant
Outland Trophy	Duke	Vince Oghobaase
Outland Trophy	Virginia Tech	Sergio Render
Outland Trophy	Wake Forest	Boo Robinson
Fred Biletnikoff Award	Clemson	Jacoby Ford
Walter Camp Award	Clemson	C. J. Spiller
Walter Camp Award	Georgia Tech	Jonathan Dwyer
Jim Thorpe Award	Clemson	Crezdon Butler
Jim Thorpe Award	Clemson	Chris Chancellor
Jim Thorpe Award	Georgia Tech	Morgan Burnett
Jim Thorpe Award	North Carolina	Kendric Burey
Jim Thorpe Award	North Carolina	Deunta Williams
Jim Thorpe Award	Virginia	Ras-I Dowling]
Jim Thorpe Award	Virginia Tech	Kam Chancellor
Jim Thorpe Award	Virginia Tech	Stephen Virgil
Bednarik Award	Duke	Vince Oghobaase
Bednarik Award	Georgia Tech	Morgan Burnett
Bednarik Award	Maryland	Alex Wujciak
Bednarik Award	North Carolina	Marvin Austin
Bednarik Award	North Carolina	Quan Sturdivant
Bednarik Award	NC State	Willie Young
Bednarik Award	Virginia Tech	Jason Worilds
Doak Walker Award	Clemson	C. J. Spiller
Doak Walker Award	Georgia Tech	Jonathan Dwyer
Doak Walker Award	Maryland	Da'Rel Scott
Doak Walker Award	North Carolina	Shaun Draughn
Doak Walker Award	NC State	Jamelle Eugene
Doak Walker Award	Virginia Tech	Darren Evans
Davey O'Brien Award	Georgia Tech	Josh Nesbitt
Davey O'Brien Award	NC State	Russell Wilson
Davey O'Brien Award	Virginia Tech	Tyrod Taylor
Davey O'Brien Award	Wake Forest	Riley Skinner

== Regular season ==
Index to colors and formatting
ACC member won
ACC member lost
ACC member win vacated
ACC teams in **bold**

All times Eastern time

Rankings reflect that of the USA Today Coaches poll until week eight when the BCS poll will be used.

=== Week One ===
ESPN's College GameDay broadcast from Atlanta for the Chick-fil-A Kickoff Game against Virginia Tech and Alabama.

Date	Time	Visiting team	Home team	Site	TV	Result	Attendance
September 3	7:00 p.m.	South Carolina	**NC State**	Carter–Finley Stadium • Raleigh, North Carolina	ESPN	**L** 7–3	57,583
September 5	12:00 p.m.	Baylor	**Wake Forest**	BB&T Field • Winston-Salem, North Carolina	ABC	**L** 24–21	27,905
September 5	1:00 p.m.	Jacksonville State	#15 **Georgia Tech**	Bobby Dodd Stadium • Atlanta		**W** 37–17	46,131
September 5	2:00 p.m.	Northeastern Huskies football	**Boston College**	Alumni Stadium • Chestnut Hill, Massachusetts		**W** 54–0	33,262
September 5	6:00 p.m.	Middle Tennessee State	**Clemson**	Memorial Stadium • Clemson, South Carolina		**W** 37–14	75,000
September 5	6:00 p.m.	William & Mary	**Virginia**	Scott Stadium • Charlottesville, Virginia		**L** 26–14	54,587
September 5	6:00 p.m.	The Citadel	#20 **North Carolina**	Kenan Memorial Stadium • Chapel Hill, North Carolina		**V** 40–6 (vacated)	58,500
September 5	7:00 p.m.	Richmond	**Duke**	Wallace Wade Stadium • Durham, North Carolina		**L** 24–16	33,011
September 5	8:00 p.m.	#5 Alabama	#7 **Virginia Tech**	Georgia Dome neutral site • Atlanta	ABC	**L** 34–24	74,954
September 5	10:00 p.m.	**Maryland**	#12 California	California Memorial Stadium • Berkeley, California	ESPN2	**L** 52–13	62,367
September 7	8:00 p.m.	**Miami**	#19 **Florida State**	Doak Campbell Stadium • Tallahassee, Florida		**MIA** 38–34	81,077

Players of the week:

Offensive back		Offensive lineman		Defensive lineman		Defensive back		Specialist		Rookie	
Player	Team	Player	Team	Player	Team	Player	Team	Player	Team	Player	Team
Jacory Harris	Miami	Alan Pelc	North Carolina	Brandon Maye	Clemson	Brandon Harris	Miami	C. J. Spiller	Clemson	Ryan Williams	Virginia Tech

=== Week Two ===
Date	Time	Visiting team	Home team	Site	TV	Result	Attendance
September 10	7:30 p.m.	**Clemson**	#14 **Georgia Tech**	Bobby Dodd Stadium • Atlanta	ESPN	**GT** 30–27	52,029
September 12	12:00 p.m.	**Duke**	Army	Michie Stadium • West Point, New York	CBS College Sports	**W** 35–19	25,698
September 12	12:00 p.m.	#19 **North Carolina**	Connecticut	Rentschler Field • East Hartford, Connecticut	ESPNU	**V** 12–10 (vacated)	38,087
September 12	12:00 p.m.	Stanford	**Wake Forest**	BB&T Field • Winston-Salem, North Carolina		**W** 24–17	30,002
September 12	1:30 p.m.	Marshall	#15 **Virginia Tech**	Lane Stadium • Blacksburg, Virginia		**W** 52–10	66,233
September 12	2:00 p.m.	Kent State	**Boston College**	Alumni Stadium • Chestnut Hill, Massachusetts		**W** 34–7	25,165
September 12	3:30 p.m.	#16 Texas Christian	**Virginia**	Scott Stadium • Charlottesville, Virginia	ESPNU	**L** 30–14	48,336
September 12	6:00 p.m.	James Madison	**Maryland**	Byrd Stadium • College Park, Maryland		**W** 38–35 OT	46,485
September 12	6:00 p.m.	Murray State	**NC State**	Carter–Finley Stadium • Raleigh, North Carolina		**W** 65–7	55,510
September 12	6:00 p.m.	Jacksonville State	**Florida State**	Doak Campbell Stadium • Tallahassee, Florida		**W** 19–9	71,420

Players of the week:

Offensive back		Offensive lineman		Defensive lineman		Defensive back		Specialist		Rookie	
Player	Team	Player	Team	Player	Team	Player	Team	Player	Team	Player	Team
Riley Skinner	Wake Forest	Caz Piurowski	Florida State	Derrick Morgan	Georgia Tech	Leon Wright	Duke	Scott Blair	Georgia Tech	Kyle Parker	Clemson

=== Week Three ===
Date	Time	Visiting team	Home team	Site	TV	Result	Attendance
September 17	7:30 p.m.	#14 **Georgia Tech**	#20 **Miami**	Land Shark Stadium • Miami Gardens, Florida	ESPN	**MIA** 33–17	45,329
September 19	12:00 p.m.	**Boston College**	**Clemson**	Memorial Stadium • Clemson, South Carolina		**CLEM** 25–7	77,000
September 19	12:00 p.m.	**Duke**	#23 Kansas	Memorial Stadium • Lawrence, Kansas	Versus	**L** 44–16	50,101
September 19	12:00 p.m.	East Carolina	#19 **North Carolina**	Kenan Memorial Stadium • Chapel Hill, North Carolina	ESPN2	**V** 31–17 (vacated)	58,000
September 19	12:00 p.m.	Elon	**Wake Forest**	BB&T Field • Winston-Salem, North Carolina		**W** 35–7	31,451
September 19	3:30 p.m.	Middle Tennessee State	**Maryland**	Byrd Stadium • College Park, Maryland		**L** 32–31	43,167
September 19	3:30 p.m.	**Virginia**	Southern Mississippi	M. M. Roberts Stadium • Hattiesburg, Mississippi	CBS College Sports	**L** 38–34	31,170
September 19	3:30 p.m.	Nebraska	#14 **Virginia Tech**	Lane Stadium • Blacksburg, Virginia	ABC	**W** 16–15	66,233
September 19	6:00 p.m.	Gardner–Webb	**NC State**	Carter–Finley Stadium • Raleigh, North Carolina		**W** 45–14	53,452
September 19	7:00 p.m.	**Florida State**	#7 Brigham Young	LaVell Edwards Stadium • Provo, Utah	Versus	**W** 54–28	64,209

Players of the week:

Offensive back		Offensive lineman		Defensive lineman		Defensive back		Specialist		Rookie	
Player	Team	Player	Team	Player	Team	Player	Team	Player	Team	Player	Team
Jacory Harris	Miami	Rodney Hudson	Florida State	Ricky Sapp	Clemson	Greg Reid	Florida State	Richard Jackson	Clemson	Ryan Williams	Virginia Tech

=== Week Four ===
Date	Time	Visiting team	Home team	Site	TV	Result	Attendance
September 26	12:00 p.m.	South Florida	#18 **Florida State**	Doak Campbell Stadium • Tallahassee, Florida	ESPNU	**L** 17–7	83,524
September 26	12:00 p.m.	#18 **North Carolina**	**Georgia Tech**	Bobby Dodd Stadium • Atlanta		**GT** 24–7	50,114
September 26	2:00 p.m.	**Wake Forest**	**Boston College**	Alumni Stadium • Chestnut Hill, Massachusetts		**BC** 27–24 OT	40,892
September 26	3:30 p.m.	#14 Texas Christian	**Clemson**	Memorial Stadium • Clemson, South Carolina		**L** 14–10	70,000
September 26	3:30 p.m.	Rutgers	**Maryland**	Byrd Stadium • College Park, Maryland		**L** 34–13	43,848
September 26	3:30 p.m.	#9 **Miami**	#12 **Virginia Tech**	Lane Stadium • Blacksburg, Virginia	ABC	**VT** 31–7	66,233
September 26	3:30 p.m.	Pittsburgh	**NC State**	Carter–Finley Stadium • Raleigh, North Carolina	ESPNU	**W** 38–31	57,583
September 26	7:00 p.m.	NC Central	**Duke**	Wallace Wade Stadium • Durham, North Carolina		**W** 49–14	26,390

Players of the week:

Offensive back		Offensive lineman		Defensive lineman		Defensive back		Specialist		Rookie	
Player	Team	Player	Team	Player	Team	Player	Team	Player	Team	Player	Team
Russell Wilson	NC State	Blake DeChristopher/Sean Bedford	Virginia Tech/Georgia Tech	Jason Worilds	Virginia Tech	Morgan Burnett	Georgia Tech	Greg Reid	Florida State	Ryan Williams	Virginia Tech

=== Week Five ===
ESPN's College Gameday broadcast from Chestnut Hill, Massachusetts for the Boston College vs Florida State game. Boston College linebacker Mark Herzlich, the 2008 ACC Defensive player of the year who earlier in the year was diagnosed with Ewing's sarcoma, announced he was now cancer free.

Date	Time	Visiting team	Home team	Site	TV	Result	Attendance
October 3	12:00 p.m.	**Clemson**	**Maryland**	Byrd Stadium • College Park, Maryland	ESPNU	**MARY** 24–21	46,243
October 3	12:00 p.m.	#6 **Virginia Tech**	**Duke**	Wallace Wade Stadium • Durham, North Carolina		**VT** 34–13	26,211
October 3	12:00 p.m.	**Virginia**	**North Carolina**	Kenan Memorial Stadium • Chapel Hill, North Carolina		**UVA** 16–3	57,800
October 3	3:30 p.m.	**NC State**	**Wake Forest**	BB&T Field • Winston-Salem, North Carolina	ESPNU	**WAKE** 30–24	33,921
October 3	3:30 p.m.	**Florida State**	**Boston College**	Alumni Stadium • Chestnut Hill, Massachusetts	ABC	**BC** 28–21	40,029
October 3	7:30 p.m.	#25 **Georgia Tech**	Mississippi	Davis Wade Stadium • Starkville, Mississippi		**W** 42–31	50,035
October 3	8:00 p.m.	#8 Oklahoma	#21 **Miami**	Land Shark Stadium • Miami Gardens, Florida	ABC	**W** 21–20	61,790

Players of the week:

Offensive back		Offensive lineman		Defensive lineman		Defensive back		Specialist		Rookie	
Player	Team	Player	Team	Player	Team	Player	Team	Player	Team	Player	Team
Riley Skinner	Wake Forest	Jason Fox	Miami	Brad Jefferson/Matt Conrath	Georgia Tech/Virginia	Cody Grimm	Virginia Tech	Nick Ferrara/Robert Randolph	Maryland/Virginia	Demetrius Hartsfield	Maryland

=== Week Six ===
Date	Time	Visiting team	Home team	Site	TV	Result	Attendance
October 10	12:00 p.m.	**Boston College**	#5 **Virginia Tech**	Lane Stadium • Blacksburg, Virginia		**VT** 48–14	66,233
October 10	3:30 p.m.	Indiana	**Virginia**	Scott Stadium • Charlottesville, Virginia		**W** 47–7	45,371
October 10	4:00 p.m.	**Duke**	**NC State**	Carter–Finley Stadium • Raleigh, North Carolina	ESPNU	**DUKE** 49–28	56,452
October 10	6:30 p.m.	**Maryland**	**Wake Forest**	BB&T Field • Winston-Salem, North Carolina		**WAKE** 42–32	32,780
October 10	7:00 p.m.	Florida A&M	#11 **Miami**	Land Shark Stadium • Miami Gardens, Florida		**W** 48–16	47,859
October 10	8:00 p.m.	#23 **Georgia Tech**	**Florida State**	Doak Campbell Stadium • Tallahassee, Florida	ESPN2	**GT** 49–44	76,292
October 10	3:30 p.m.	Georgia Southern	**North Carolina**	Kenan Memorial Stadium • Chapel Hill, North Carolina	ABC	**V** 42–14 (vacated)	47,000

Players of the week:

Offensive back		Offensive lineman		Defensive lineman		Defensive back		Specialist		Rookie	
Player	Team	Player	Team	Player	Team	Player	Team	Player	Team	Player	Team
Thaddeus Lewis	Duke	Cord Howard	Georgia Tech	John Russell	Wake Forest	Ras-I Dowling	Virginia	Torrey Smith	Maryland	Ryan Williams	Virginia Tech

=== Week Seven ===
Date	Time	Visiting team	Home team	Site	TV	Result	Attendance
October 17	12:00 p.m.	**Wake Forest**	**Clemson**	Memorial Stadium • Clemson, South Carolina		**CLEM** 38–3	72,000
October 17	3:30 p.m.	**NC State**	**Boston College**	Alumni Stadium • Chestnut Hill, Massachusetts	ABC	**BC** 52–20	35,261
October 17	4:00 p.m.	**Virginia**	**Maryland**	Bryd Stadium • College Park, Maryland	ESPNU	**UVA** 20–9	44,864
October 17	6:00 p.m.	#4 **Virginia Tech**	#20 **Georgia Tech**	Bobby Dodd Stadium • Atlanta	ESPN2	**GT** 28–23	54,405
October 17	7:30 p.m.	#11 **Miami**	Central Florida	Bright House Networks Stadium • Orlando, Florida	CBS College Sports	**W** 27–7	48,453

Players of the week:

Offensive back		Offensive lineman		Defensive lineman		Defensive back		Specialist		Rookie	
Player	Team	Player	Team	Player	Team	Player	Team	Player	Team	Player	Team
Montel Harris	Boston College	Sean Bedford	Georgia Tech	Nate Collins	Virginia	DeAndre McDaniel	Clemson	Matt Bosher	Miami	Ryan Williams	Virginia Tech

=== Week Eight ===
Date	Time	Visiting team	Home team	Site	TV	Result	Attendance
October 22	8:00 p.m.	**Florida State**	**North Carolina**	Kenan Memorial Stadium • Chapel Hill, North Carolina	ESPN	**FSU** 30–27	58,000
October 24	12:00 p.m.	#12 **Georgia Tech**	**Virginia**	Scott Stadium • Charlottesville, Virginia		**GT** 34–9	43,016
October 24	1:30 p.m.	**Maryland**	**Duke**	Wallace Wade Stadium • Durham, North Carolina		**DUKE** 17–13	24,650
October 24	3:30 p.m.	**Boston College**	Notre Dame	Notre Dame Stadium • Notre Dame, Indiana	NBC	**L** 20–16	80,795
October 24	3:30 p.m.	**Clemson**	#10 **Miami**	Land Shark Stadium • Miami Gardens, Florida	ABC	**CLEM** 40–37 in OT	43,778
October 24	3:30 p.m.	**Wake Forest**	Navy	Navy–Marine Corps Memorial Stadium • Annapolis, Maryland	CBS College Sports	**L** 13–10	31,907

Players of the week:

Offensive back		Offensive lineman		Defensive lineman		Defensive back		Specialist		Rookie	
Player	Team	Player	Team	Player	Team	Player	Team	Player	Team	Player	Team
Christian Ponder	Florida State	Andrew Datko	Florida State	Vincent Rey/Nate Collins	Duke/Virginia	DeAndre McDaniel	Clemson	C. J. Spiller	Clemson	Kyle Parker	Clemson

=== Week Nine ===
Date	Time	Visiting team	Home team	Site	TV	Result	Attendance
October 29	7:30 p.m.	**North Carolina**	#13 **Virginia Tech**	Lane Stadium • Blacksburg, Virginia	ESPN	**V UNC** 20–17 (vacated)	66,233
October 31	12:00 p.m.	**NC State**	**Florida State**	Doak Campbell Stadium • Tallahassee, Florida		**FSU** 45–42	67,712
October 31	1:30 p.m.	Coastal Carolina	**Clemson**	Memorial Stadium • Clemson, South Carolina		**W** 49–3	71,500
October 31	3:30 p.m.	Central Michigan	**Boston College**	Alumni Stadium • Chestnut Hill, Massachusetts	ESPNU	**W** 31–10	34,128
October 31	3:30 p.m.	#19 **Miami**	**Wake Forest**	BB&T Field • Winston-Salem, North Carolina	ABC	**MIA** 28–27	30,011
October 31	3:30 p.m.	**Duke**	**Virginia**	Scott Stadium • Charlottesville, Virginia		**DUKE** 28–17	41,713
October 31	7:30 p.m.	#11 **Georgia Tech**	Vanderbilt	Vanderbilt Stadium • Nashville, Tennessee		**W** 56–31	30,262

Players of the week:

Offensive back		Offensive lineman		Defensive lineman		Defensive back		Specialist		Rookie	
Player	Team	Player	Team	Player	Team	Player	Team	Player	Team	Player	Team
Jacory Harris/Thaddeus Lewis	Miami/Duke	Rodney Hudson	Florida State	Tydreke Powell	North Carolina	Luke Kuechly	Boston College	Will Snyderwine	Duke	Conner Vernon	Duke

=== Week Ten ===
Date	Time	Visiting team	Home team	Site	TV	Result	Attendance
November 5	7:30 p.m.	#23 **Virginia Tech**	East Carolina	Dowdy–Ficklen Stadium • Greenville, North Carolina	ESPN	**W** 16–3	43,569
November 7	12:00 p.m.	**Virginia**	#17 **Miami**	Land Shark Stadium • Miami Gardens, Florida		**MIA** 52–17	48,350
November 7	1:00 p.m.	**Maryland**	**NC State**	Carter–Finley Stadium • Raleigh, North Carolina		**NCST** 38–31	55,631
November 7	3:30 p.m.	**Duke**	**North Carolina**	Kenan Memorial Stadium • Chapel Hill, North Carolina	ESPNU	**V UNC** 16–9 (vacated)	59,750
November 7	3:30 p.m.	**Wake Forest**	#10 **Georgia Tech**	Bobby Dodd Stadium • Atlanta, Georgia	ABC	**GT** 30–27 in OT	51,415
November 7	7:45 p.m.	**Florida State**	**Clemson**	Memorial Stadium • Clemson, South Carolina	ESPN	**CLEM** 40–24	77,000

Players of the week:

Offensive back		Offensive lineman		Defensive lineman		Defensive back		Specialist		Rookie	
Player	Team	Player	Team	Player	Team	Player	Team	Player	Team	Player	Team
C. J. Spiller	Clemson	Jason Fox	Miami	Robert Quinn	North Carolina	Cody Grimm	Virginia Tech	Torrey Smith	Maryland	Ryan Williams	Virginia Tech

=== Week Eleven ===
Date	Time	Visiting team	Home team	Site	TV	Result	Attendance
November 14	12:00 p.m.	**Clemson**	NC State	Carter–Finley Stadium • Raleigh, North Carolina		**CLEM** 43–23	57,583
November 14	12:00 p.m	#7 **Georgia Tech**	Duke	Wallace Wade Stadium • Durham, North Carolina	ESPN2	**GT** 49–10	25,899
November 14	12:00 p.m.	**Florida State**	Wake Forest	BB&T Field • Winston-Salem, North Carolina	ESPNU	**FSU** 41–28	33,411
November 14	1:00 p.m.	#21 **Virginia Tech**	Maryland	Byrd Stadium • College Park, Maryland		**VT** 36–9	51,514
November 14	3:30 p.m.	**Boston College**	Virginia	Scott Stadium • Charlottesville, Virginia		**BC** 14–10	44,324
November 14	3:30 p.m.	#14 **Miami**	North Carolina	Kenan Memorial Stadium • Chapel Hill, North Carolina	ABC	**V UNC** 33–24 (vacated)	57,500

Players of the week:

Offensive back		Offensive lineman		Defensive lineman		Defensive back		Specialist		Rookie	
Player	Team	Player	Team	Player	Team	Player	Team	Player	Team	Player	Team
C. J. Spiller	Clemson	Cord Howard	Georgia Tech	Ben Anderson	Georgia Tech	Kendric Burney	North Carolina	Casey Barth	North Carolina	EJ Manuel	Florida State

=== Week Twelve ===
Date	Time	Visiting team	Home team	Site	TV	Result	Attendance
November 21	12:00 p.m.	**North Carolina**	**Boston College**	Alumni Stadium • Chestnut Hill, Massachusetts	ESPN2	**V UNC** 31–13 (vacated)	41,272
November 21	12:00 p.m.	**Duke**	#20 **Miami**	Land Shark Stadium • Miami Gardens, Florida	ESPNU	**MIA** 34–16	38,200
November 21	12:00 p.m.	**Maryland**	**Florida State**	Doak Campbell Stadium • Tallahassee, Florida		**FSU** 29–26	66,042
November 21	3:30 p.m.	**Virginia**	#23 **Clemson**	Memorial Stadium • Clemson, South Carolina	ABC	**CLEM** 34–21	77,000
November 21	3:30 p.m.	**NC State**	#15 **Virginia Tech**	Lane Stadium • Blacksburg, Virginia	ESPNU	**VT** 38–10	66,233

Players of the week:

Offensive back		Offensive lineman		Defensive lineman		Defensive back		Specialist		Rookie	
Player	Team	Player	Team	Player	Team	Player	Team	Player	Team	Player	Team
Jacory Harris	Miami	Sergio Render	Virginia Tech	Darryl Sharpton	Miami	Cody Grimm	Virginia Tech	Greg Reid	Florida State	Luke Kuechly	Boston College

=== Week Thirteen ===
ESPN's College Gameday broadcast from Gainesville, Florida for the Florida vs Florida State game.

Date	Time	Visiting team	Home team	Site	TV	Result	Attendance
November 28	12:00 p.m.	**Wake Forest**	**Duke**	Wallace Wade Stadium • Durham, North Carolina		**WAKE** 45–34	21,420
November 28	12:00 p.m.	#18 **Clemson**	South Carolina	Williams-Brice Stadium • Columbia, South Carolina	ESPN	**L** 34–17	80,574
November 28	12:00 p.m.	#24 **North Carolina**	**NC State**	Carter–Finley Stadium • Raleigh, North Carolina	ESPN2	**NCST** 28–27	57,583
November 28	3:30 p.m.	#17 **Miami**	South Florida	Raymond James Stadium • Tampa, Florida	ABC	**W** 31–10	66,469
November 28	3:30 p.m.	**Florida State**	#1 Florida	Ben Hill Griffin Stadium • Gainesville, Florida	CBS	**L** 37–10	90,907
November 28	3:30 p.m.	**Boston College**	**Maryland**	Byrd Stadium • College Park, Maryland	ESPNU	**BC** 19–17	35,042
November 28	3:30 p.m.	#14 **Virginia Tech**	**Virginia**	Scott Stadium • Charlottesville, Virginia	ESPN	**VT** 42–13	58,555
November 28	8:00 p.m.	Georgia	#7 **Georgia Tech**	Bobby Dodd Stadium • Atlanta, Georgia	ABC/ESPN2	**L** 30–24	55,407

Players of the week:

Offensive back		Offensive lineman		Defensive lineman		Defensive back		Specialist		Rookie	
Player	Team	Player	Team	Player	Team	Player	Team	Player	Team	Player	Team
Riley Skinner	Wake Forest	Orlando Franklin	Miami	Darryl Sharpton	Miami	Luke Kuechly	Boston College	Matt Bosher	Miami	Ryan Williams	Virginia Tech

=== Week Fourteen- ACC Championship Game ===
Date	Time	Atlantic Division Champion	Coastal Division Champion	Site	TV	Result	Attendance
December 5	8:00 p.m.	**Clemson**	#10 **Georgia Tech**	Raymond James Stadium • Tampa, Florida	ESPN	**GT** 39–34	57,227

== Rankings ==
Legend
	Improvement in ranking
	Drop in ranking
	Not ranked previous week
RV	Received votes but were not ranked in Top 25 of poll

		Pre	Wk 1	Wk 2	Wk 3	Wk 4	Wk 5	Wk 6	Wk 7	Wk 8	Wk 9	Wk 10	Wk 11	Wk 12	Wk 13	Wk 14	Final
Boston College	AP	RV	RV	RV			RV		RV		RV		RV				
Boston College	C	RV	RV				RV		RV		RV	RV	RV				
Boston College	BCS	Not released															
Clemson	AP	RV	RV	RV	RV					RV	RV	24	18	15	25	RV	24
Clemson	C	RV	RV							RV	RV	RV	19	16	RV	RV	RV
Clemson	BCS	Not released											23	18			
Duke	AP																
Duke	C										RV						
Duke	BCS	Not released															
Florida State	AP	18	RV	RV	18												RV
Florida State	C	19	RV	RV	25	RV											RV
Florida State	BCS	Not released															
Georgia Tech	AP	15	15	14	RV	25	22	19	11	11	10	7	7	7	12	9	13
Georgia Tech	C	15	13	13	RV	RV	23	20	13	11	11	7	7	7	11	10	13
Georgia Tech	BCS	Not released							12	11	10	7	7	7	10	9	
Maryland	AP																
Maryland	C	RV															
Maryland	BCS	Not released															
Miami	AP	RV	20	20	9	17	11	9	8	18	16	12	21	19	17	14	19
Miami	C	RV	22	22	13	21	11	11	9	18	17	15	24	21	17	15	19
Miami	BCS	Not released							10	19	17	14	20	17	17	15	
North Carolina	AP	21	19	24	22	RV							RV	23	RV	RV	
North Carolina	C	20	19	19	18	RV		RV	RV		RV	RV	25	24	RV	RV	
North Carolina	BCS	Not released												24			
NC State	AP	RV															
NC State	C	RV				RV											
NC State	BCS	Not released															
Virginia	AP																
Virginia	C																
Virginia	BCS	Not released															
Virginia Tech	AP	7	14	13	11	6	5	4	15	14	22	20	16	14	11	12	10
Virginia Tech	C	7	15	14	12	6	5	4	15	14	24	21	16	14	11	12	10
Virginia Tech	BCS	Not released							14	13	23	21	15	14	12	11	
Wake Forest	AP																
Wake Forest	C	RV															
Wake Forest	BCS	Not released															

== All-ACC teams ==
=== First Team ===
Offense
QB Josh Nesbitt- Georgia Tech
RB Jonathan Dwyer- Georgia Tech
RB Ryan Williams- Virginia Tech
WR Demaryius Thomas- Georgia Tech
WR Donovan Varner- Duke
TE George Bryan- NC State
TE Michael Palmer – Clemson
OT Jason Curtis Fox- Miami
OT Anthony Castonzo- Boston College
OG Cordaro Howard- Georgia Tech
OG Rodney Hudson- Florida State
C Sean Bedford- Georgia Tech
PK Matt Bosher- Miami
PK Matt Waldron- Virginia Tech
SPEC C. J. Spiller- Clemson

Defense
DE Derrick Morgan- Georgia Tech
DE Robert Quinn- North Carolina
DT Nate Collins- Virginia
DT Allen Bailey- Miami
LB Cody Grimm- Virginia Tech
LB Luke Kuechly- Boston College
LB Quan Sturdivant- North Carolina
LB Alex Wujciak- Maryland
CB Kendric Burney- North Carolina
CB Brandon Harris- Miami
S DeAndre McDaniel- Clemson
S Deunta Williams- North Carolina
P Brent Bowden- Virginia Tech

=== Second Team ===
Offense
QB Thaddeus Lewis- Duke
RB C. J. Spiller- Clemson
RB Montel Harris- Boston College
WR Torrey Smith- Maryland
WR Jacoby Ford- Clemson
TE Greg Boone- Virginia Tech
OT Ed Wang- Virginia Tech
OT Chris Hairston- Clemson
OG Thomas Austin- Clemson
OG Sergio Render- Virginia Tech
C Matt Tennant- Boston College
PK Casey Barth- North Carolina
PK Will Snyderwine- Duke
SPEC Torrey Smith- Maryland

Defense
DE Ricky Sapp- Clemson
DE Willie Young- NC State
DE Jason Worilds- Virginia Tech
DT Marvin Austin- North Carolina
DT John Russell- Wake Forest
LB Vincent Rey- Duke
LB Darryl Sharpton- Miami
LB Bruce Carter- North Carolina
LB Colin McCarthy- Miami
LB Dekoda Watson- Florida State
CB Ras-I Dowling- Virginia
CB Patrick Robinson- Florida State
S Morgan Burnett- Georgia Tech
S Kam Chancellor- Virginia Tech
P Matt Bosher- Miami

=== Player of the year ===
C. J. Spiller- Clemson

== Bowl games ==
Bowl Game	Date	Stadium	City	Television	Matchup/Results	Attendance	Payout (US$)
Meineke Car Care Bowl	December 26, 2009	Bank of America Stadium	Charlotte, North Carolina	ESPN	Pittsburgh 19, North Carolina 17	50,389	$1,000,000
Emerald Bowl	December 26, 2009	AT&T Park	San Francisco	ESPN	USC 24, Boston College 13	40,121	$750,000
Gaylord Hotels Music City Bowl	December 27, 2009	LP Field	Nashville, Tennessee	ESPN	Clemson 21, Kentucky 13	57,280	$1,700,000
Champs Sports Bowl	December 29, 2009	Florida Citrus Bowl Stadium	Orlando, Florida	ESPN	Wisconsin 20, Miami 14	56,747	$2,250,000
Chick-fil-A Bowl	December 31, 2009	Georgia Dome	Atlanta	ESPN	Virginia Tech 37, Tennessee 14	73,777	$3,250,000
Konica Minolta Gator Bowl	January 1, 2009	Jacksonville Municipal Stadium	Jacksonville, Florida	CBS	Florida State 33, West Virginia 21	84,129	$2,500,000
FedEx Orange Bowl	January 5, 2009	Land Shark Stadium	Miami Gardens, Florida	Fox	Iowa 24, Georgia Tech 14	66,131	$17,500,000

== Attendance ==
Team	Stadium (Capacity)	Game 1	Game 2	Game 3	Game 4	Game 5	Game 6	Game 7	Game 8	Total	Average	% of Capacity
Boston College	Alumni Stadium (44,500)	33,262	25,165	40,892	40,029	35,261	34,128	41,272		250,009	35,715	80.3
Clemson	Memorial Stadium (80,301)	75,000	77,000	70,000	72,000	71,500	77,000	77,000		519,500	74,214	92.4
Duke	Wallace Wade Stadium (33,941)	33,011	26,390	26,211	24,650	25,899	21,420			157,581	26,264	77.4
Florida State	Doak Campbell Stadium (82,300)	81,077	71,420	83,524	76,292	67,712	66,042			446,067	74,345	90.3
Georgia Tech	Bobby Dodd Stadium (55,000)	46,131	52,029	50,114	54,405	51,415	55,407			309,501	51,584	93.8
Maryland	Byrd Stadium (54,000)	46,485	43,167	43,848	46,243	44,864	51,514	35,042		311,163	44,452	82.3
Miami	Land Shark Stadium (76,500)	45,329	61,790	47,859	43,778	48,350	38,200			285,306	47,551	62.1
North Carolina	Kenan Memorial Stadium (60,000)	58,500	58,000	57,800	47,000	58,000	59,750	57,500		396,550	56,650	94.4
NC State	Carter–Finley Stadium (57,583)	57,583	55,510	53,452	57,583	56,452	55,631	57,583	57,583	451,377	56,422	98.0
Virginia	Scott Stadium (61,500)	54,587	48,336	45,371	43,016	41,713	44,324	58,555		335,902	47,986	78.0
Virginia Tech	Lane Stadium (66,233)	66,233	66,233	66,233	66,233	66,233	66,233			397,398	66,233	100
Wake Forest	BB&T Field (31,500)	27,905	30,002	31,451	33,921	32,780	30,011	33,411		216,581	31,359	99.6
