= 2009 Boston College Eagles football team =

American college football season

2009 Boston College Eagles football
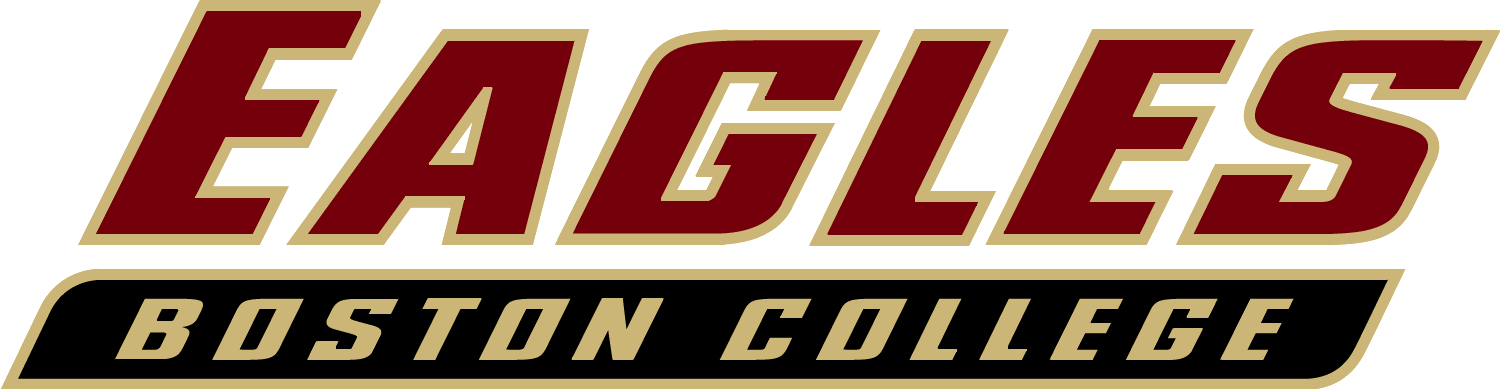

Emerald Bowl, L 13–24 vs USC
- Conference: Atlantic Coast Conference
- Atlantic Division
- Record: 8–5 (5–3 ACC)
- Head coach: Frank Spaziani (1st season)
- Offensive coordinator: Gary Tranquill (1st season)
- Offensive scheme: Pro-style
- Defensive coordinator: Bill McGovern (1st season)
- Base defense: 4–3
- Captains: Rich Gunnell; Mike McLaughlin; Matt Tennant
- Home stadium: Alumni Stadium

2009 Atlantic Coast Conference football standings
	Conf.			Overall
Team	W		L	W		L
Atlantic Division
No. 24 Clemson x	6	–	2	9	–	5
Boston College	5	–	3	8	–	5
Florida State	4	–	4	7	–	6
Wake Forest	3	–	5	5	–	7
NC State	2	–	6	5	–	7
Maryland	1	–	7	2	–	10
Coastal Division
No. 13 Georgia Tech * x$	7	–	1	11	–	3
No. 10 Virginia Tech	6	–	2	10	–	3
No. 19 Miami (FL)	5	–	3	9	–	4
North Carolina *	0	–	4	0	–	5
Duke	3	–	5	5	–	7
Virginia	2	–	6	3	–	9
Championship: Georgia Tech 39, Clemson 34
$ – BCS representative as conference champion; North Carolina vacated 8 wins, including 4 ACC wins.; Rankings from AP Poll

The 2009 Boston College Eagles football team represented Boston College in the 2009 NCAA Division I FBS football season as a member of the Atlantic Division of the Atlantic Coast Conference. The Eagles were led by first-year head coach Frank Spaziani. He replaced Jeff Jagodzinski who was fired after the 2008 season. The Eagles finished the season 8–5, 5–3 in ACC play and lost in the Emerald Bowl 24–13 against USC.

== Preseason ==
Mobile quarterback Anthony Haney (New Jersey recruit) was injured in an early preseason practice due to a career ending arm injury

=== Mark Herzlich ===
Mark Herzlich, a senior linebacker and the 2008 ACC Defensive Player of the Year, revealed on May 14 that he had been diagnosed with Ewing's sarcoma, a cancer most commonly found in bone or soft tissue. In his statement, he indicated he was unsure what his illness would mean for his football future.

== Season highlights ==
In the Eagles 52–20 win over NC State, Sophomore RB Montel Harris set two single-game school records when he rushed for 264 yards and 5 TDs.

On October 3, College Gameday came to Boston College for the Eagles' game against the Florida State Seminoles. During the broadcast, star LB Mark Herzlich, who was forced to miss the entire 2009 season after being diagnosed with Ewing's Sarcoma, publicly announced that he was cancer-free. BC went on to beat the Seminoles by a score of 28–21.

Early in the season, Boston College won in thrilling fashion as the Eagles defeated Wake Forest 27–24 in OT. Boston College had the ball first in OT and kicked a field goal. On Wake Forest's possession, the Demon Deacons had a First and Goal from the 3 yard line. Amazingly, Isaac Johnson stripped Riley Skinner and Wes Davis recovered the ensuing fumble to snatch victory from the jaws of defeat.

True freshman Luke Kuechly was pressed into service as a weakside linebacker due to the unexpected departure of Herzlich and became a national sensation. He led the team and conference and finished second in the nation in Total Tackles with 158. Kuechly was named to the CFN All-America Team, the ACC Defensive Rookie of the Year, and the Defensive MVP of the Emerald Bowl.

== Schedule ==
Date	Time	Opponent	Site	TV	Result	Attendance	Source
September 5	2:00 p.m.	Northeastern*	Alumni Stadium; Chestnut Hill, MA	ESPN360	W 54–0	33,262	
September 12	2:00 p.m.	Kent State*	Alumni Stadium; Chestnut Hill, MA	ESPN360	W 34–7	25,165	
September 19	12:00 p.m.	at Clemson	Memorial Stadium; Clemson, SC (O'Rourke–McFadden Trophy)	Raycom	L 7–25	77,362	
September 26	2:00 p.m.	Wake Forest	Alumni Stadium; Chestnut Hill, MA	ESPN360	W 27–24 ^{OT}	40,892	
October 3	3:30 p.m.	Florida State	Alumni Stadium; Chestnut Hill, MA (College GameDay)	ABC/ESPN2	W 28–21	40,029	
October 10	12:00 p.m.	at No. 5 Virginia Tech	Lane Stadium; Blacksburg, VA (rivalry)	Raycom	L 14–48	66,233	
October 17	3:30 p.m.	NC State	Alumni Stadium; Chestnut Hill, MA	ABC	W 52–20	35,261	
October 24	3:30 p.m.	at Notre Dame*	Notre Dame Stadium; Notre Dame, IN (Holy War)	NBC	L 16–20	80,795	
October 31	3:30 p.m.	Central Michigan*	Alumni Stadium; Chestnut Hill, MA	ESPNU	W 31–10	34,128	
November 14	3:30 p.m.	at Virginia	Scott Stadium; Charlottesville, VA	ESPN360	W 14–10	44,324	
November 21	12:00 p.m.	North Carolina	Alumni Stadium; Chestnut Hill, MA	ESPN2	L 13–31	41,272	
November 28	3:30 p.m.	at Maryland	Byrd Stadium; College Park, MD	ESPNU	W 19–17	35,042	
December 26	8:00 p.m.	vs. USC*	AT&T Park; San Francisco, CA (Emerald Bowl)	ESPN	L 13–24	40,121	
*Non-conference game; Rankings from Coaches' Poll released prior to the game; All times are in Eastern time

== Drafted players ==
2010	5	27	158	Matt Tennant	New Orleans Saints	C
