= 2009 Wake Forest Demon Deacons football team =

American college football season

2009 Wake Forest Demon Deacons football
- Conference: Atlantic Coast Conference
- Atlantic Division
- Record: 5–7 (3–5 ACC)
- Head coach: Jim Grobe (9th season)
- Offensive coordinator: Steed Lobotzke (7th season)
- Offensive scheme: Spread
- Defensive coordinator: Brad Lambert (2nd season)
- Base defense: 4–3
- Captain: Game captains
- Home stadium: BB&T Field

2009 Atlantic Coast Conference football standings
	Conf.			Overall
Team	W		L	W		L
Atlantic Division
No. 24 Clemson x	6	–	2	9	–	5
Boston College	5	–	3	8	–	5
Florida State	4	–	4	7	–	6
Wake Forest	3	–	5	5	–	7
NC State	2	–	6	5	–	7
Maryland	1	–	7	2	–	10
Coastal Division
No. 13 Georgia Tech * x$	7	–	1	11	–	3
No. 10 Virginia Tech	6	–	2	10	–	3
No. 19 Miami (FL)	5	–	3	9	–	4
North Carolina *	0	–	4	0	–	5
Duke	3	–	5	5	–	7
Virginia	2	–	6	3	–	9
Championship: Georgia Tech 39, Clemson 34
$ – BCS representative as conference champion; North Carolina vacated 8 wins, including 4 ACC wins.; Rankings from AP Poll

The 2009 Wake Forest Demon Deacons football team represented Wake Forest University during the 2009 NCAA Division I FBS football season. The team was coached by Jim Grobe during his ninth season at the school and played its home games at BB&T Field. Wake Forest competed in the Atlantic Coast Conference, as they have since the league's inception in 1953. The Deacons finished the season with a record of 5–7 and 3–5 in ACC play. The Deacons missed out on a bowl game for the first time since the 2005 season.

== Schedule ==
Date	Time	Opponent	Site	TV	Result	Attendance	Source
September 5	3:30 pm	Baylor*	BB&T Field; Winston-Salem, NC	ABC	L 21–24	27,905	
September 12	12:00 pm	Stanford*	BB&T Field; Winston-Salem, NC	Raycom	W 24–17	30,002	
September 19	6:30 pm	No. 11 (FCS) Elon*	BB&T Field; Winston-Salem, NC	ACCS	W 35–7	31,454	
September 26	2:00 pm	at Boston College	Alumni Stadium; Chestnut Hill, MA	ESPN360	L 24–27 ^{OT}	40,892	
October 3	3:30 pm	NC State	BB&T Field; Winston-Salem, NC (rivalry)	ESPNU	W 30–24	33,921	
October 10	6:30 pm	Maryland^{†}	BB&T Field; Winston-Salem, NC	ESPN360	W 42–32	32,780	
October 17	12:00 pm	at Clemson	Memorial Stadium; Clemson, SC	Raycom	L 3–38	74,298	
October 24	3:30 pm	at Navy*	Navy–Marine Corps Memorial Stadium; Annapolis, MD	CBSCS	L 10–13	31,907	
October 31	3:30 pm	No. 18 Miami (FL)	BB&T Field; Winston-Salem, NC	ABC/ESPN2	L 27–28	30,011	
November 7	3:30 pm	at No. 10 Georgia Tech	Bobby Dodd Stadium; Atlanta, GA	ABC/ESPN2	L 27–30 ^{OT}	51,415	
November 14	12:00 pm	Florida State	BB&T Field; Winston-Salem, NC	ESPNU	L 28–41	33,411	
November 28	12:00 pm	at Duke	Wallace Wade Stadium; Durham, NC (rivalry)	Raycom	W 45–34	21,420	
*Non-conference game; ^{†}Homecoming; Rankings from Coaches' Poll released prior to the game; All times are in Eastern time

== Before the season ==
=== Recruiting ===
On National Signing Day, the Demon Deacons received letters of intent from 21 players.

- Whit Barnes OL 6–4 270 Rocky Mount, NC Rocky Mount
- Tommy Bohanon FB 6–2 238 N. Fort Myers, FL N. Fort Myers
- Devin Bolling OL-DL 6–5 270 Lynchburg, VA Brookville
- Michael Campanaro RB 5–10 173 Clarksville, MD River Hill
- Steven Chase OL-DL 6–7 270 Frederick, MD Thomas Johnson
- Brendan Cross QB 6–2 198 Alpharetta, GA Chattahoochee
- John Gallagher DL 6–4 252 Ponte Vedra, FL Nease
- Josh Harris RB 5–10 190 Duncanville, TX Duncanville
- Justin Jackson LB 6–1 205 Rockingham, NC Richmond County
- Derald "D.J." Jones DB 5–10 162 Jacksonville, FL First Coast
- Duran Lowe DB 5–11 214 Plant City, FL Plant City
- Daniel Mack DB 6–0 196 Miami, FL Dad Christian
- Matt Muncy TE 6–4 215 Tazewell, VA Tazewell
- Jimmy Newman P-PK 6–2 195 Oxford, AL Oxford
- Mike Olson LB 6–3 215 Ashburn, VA Stone Bridge
- Kris Redding DL 6–4 235 Douglasville, GA Whitefield Academy
- Quan Rucker WR 6–0 185 Statesville, NC West Iredell
- Frank Souza DL 6–4 285 Ponte Vedra, FL Nease
- Dominique Tate DB 5–10 180 Winston-Salem, NC Carver
- Zach Thompson DE 6–5 250 Ashburn, VA Stone Bridge
- Nikita Whitlock LB 5–11 245 Wylie, TX Wylie

Preferred Walk-Ons: Spencer Bishop TE/LB 6–2 200 FR (HS) Pinehurst, NC (Pinecrest) Roger Khouri Fullback 6–1 230 FR (HS) Key Biscayne, FL (Ransom Everglades) Zach Massey TE/FB/LS 6–1 195 FR (HS) Kannapolis, NC (A.L. Brown) Gray Mazzone Wide Receiver 5–9 170 FR (HS) Cary, NC (Panther Creek) Josh Strickland Wide Receiver 6–2 185 FR (HS) Winston-Salem, NC (Forsyth Country Day) Alex Wulfeck Punter 5–9 170 FR (HS) Orange Park, FL (Bolles School)

== Game summaries ==
=== Baylor ===
	1	2	3	4	Total
Bears (1–0)	10	0	14	0	24
Demon Deacons (0–1)	0	7	7	7	21

5 all-time meetings: Baylor 4–1
Last meeting: 2008 at Baylor (Wake Forest 41, Baylor 13)

Scoring Play	Score
1st quarter
Baylor – David Gettis 8 yard TD pass from Robert Griffin III (Ben Parks kick), 11:10	Baylor 7–0
Baylor – Ben Parks 22 yd FG, :45	Baylor 10–0
2nd quarter
Wake Forest – Mike Rinfrette 2 yard TD run (Shane Popham kick), 6:45	Baylor 10–7
3rd quarter
Baylor – Kendall Wright 37 yard TD run (Ben Parks kick), 13:12	Baylor 17–7
Baylor – Lanear Simpson 33 yard TD pass from Ernest Smith (Ben Parks kick), 5:07	Baylor 24–7
Wake Forest – Devon Brown 19 yard TD pass from Riley Skinner (Shane Popham kick), :10	Baylor 24–14
4th quarter
Wake Forest – Andrew Parker 5 yard TD pass from Riley Skinner (Shane Popham kick), 12:30	Baylor 24–21

=== Stanford ===
	1	2	3	4	Total
Cardinal (1–1)	7	10	0	0	17
Demon Deacons (1–1)	3	0	7	14	24

First all–time meeting.

Scoring Play	Score
1st quarter
Stanford – Ryan Whalen 26 yard TD pass from Andrew Luck (Nate Whitaker kick), 10:53	Stanford 7–0
Wake Forest – Shane Popham 20 yd FG, 5:59	Stanford 7–3
2nd quarter
Stanford – Ryan Whalen 17 yard TD pass from Andrew Luck (Nate Whitaker kick), 9:40	Stanford 14–3
Stanford – Nate Whitaker 54 yd FG, :01	Stanford 17–3
3rd quarter
Wake Forest – Mike Rinfrette 3 yard TD run (Shane Popham kick), 6:41	Stanford 17–10
4th quarter
Wake Forest – Jordan Williams 9 yard TD pass from Riley Skinner (Shane Popham kick), 14:01	Tied 17–17
Wake Forest – Riley Skinner 1 yard TD run (Shane Popham kick), :02	Wake Forest 24–17

=== Elon ===
	1	2	3	4	Total
Phoenix (2–1)	0	0	0	7	7
Demon Deacons (2–1)	14	7	14	0	35

9 all-time meetings: Wake Forest 8–0–1
Last meeting: 1939 in Greensboro (Wake Forest 34, Elon 0)

Scoring Play	Score
1st quarter
Wake Forest – Jordan Williams 5 yard TD pass from Riley Skinner (Jimmy Newman kick), 10:09	Wake Forest 7–0
Wake Forest – Mike Rinfrette 1 yard TD run (Jimmy Newman kick), :49	Wake Forest 14–0
2nd quarter
Wake Forest – Chris Givens 54 yard TD pass from Riley Skinner (Jimmy Newman kick), 3:20	Wake Forest 21–0
3rd quarter
Wake Forest – Josh Adams 1 yard TD run (Jimmy Newman kick), 12:19	Wake Forest 28–0
Wake Forest – Marshall Williams 80 yard TD pass from Riley Skinner (Jimmy Newman kick), 4:14	Wake Forest 35–0
4th quarter
Elon – Terrell Hudgins 13 yard TD pass from Scott Riddle (Adam Shreiner kick), 7:58	Wake Forest 35–7

=== @ Boston College ===
	1	2	3	4	OT	Total
Demon Deacons (2–2)	0	10	0	14	0	24
Eagles (3–1)	10	7	0	7	3	27

16 all-time meetings: Boston College 8–6–2
Last meeting: 2008 at Wake Forest (Boston College 24, Wake Forest 21)

Scoring Play	Score
1st quarter
Boston College – Steve Aponavicius 32 yd FG, 7:13	Boston College 3–0
Boston College – Jordon McMichael 50 yard TD pass from Dave Shinskie (Steve Aponavicius kick), 1:50	Boston College 10–0
2nd quarter
Wake Forest – Brandon Pendergrass 76 yard TD run (Jimmy Newman kick), 11:38	Boston College 10–7
Wake Forest – Jimmy Newman 23 yd FG, 5:43	Tied 10–10
Boston College – Chris Pantale 4 yard TD pass from Dave Shinskie (Steve Aponavicius kick), :30	Boston College 17–10
4th quarter
Boston College – Colin Larmond Jr. 17 yard TD pass from Dave Shinskie (Steve Aponavicius kick), 9:42	Boston College 24–10
Wake Forest – Chris Givens 12 yard TD pass from Riley Skinner (Jimmy Newman kick), 3:44	Boston College 24–17
Wake Forest – Marshall Williams 16 yard TD pass from Riley Skinner (Jimmy Newman kick), :11	Tied 24–24
Overtime
Boston College – Steve Aponavicius 23 yd FG	Boston College 27–24

=== North Carolina State ===
	1	2	3	4	Total
Wolfpack (3–2)	10	0	7	7	24
Demon Deacons (3–2)	3	10	7	10	30

102 all-time meetings: NC State 61–35–6
Last meeting: 2008 at NC State (NC State 21, Wake Forest 17)

Scoring Play	Score
1st quarter
NC State – George Bryan 4 yard TD pass from Russell Wilson (Josh Czajkowski kick), 11:12	NC State 7–0
Wake Forest – Jimmy Newman 27 yd FG, 6:45	NC State 7–3
NC State – Josh Czajkowski 30 yd FG, 2:55	NC State 10–3
2nd quarter
Wake Forest – Marshall Williams 4 yard TD pass from Riley Skinner (Jimmy Newman kick), 13:27	Tied 10–0
Wake Forest – Jimmy Newman 23 yd FG, :16	Wake Forest 13–10
3rd quarter
Wake Forest – Marshall Williams 11 yard TD pass from Riley Skinner (Jimmy Newman kick), 6:51	Wake Forest 20–10
NC State – Russell Wilson 16 yd TD run (Josh Czajkowski kick), 4:57	Wake Forest 20–17
4th quarter
Wake Forest – Chris Givens 25 yard TD pass from Riley Skinner (Jimmy Newman kick), 10:05	Wake Forest 27–17
NC State – Toney Baker 5 yard TD pass from Russell Wilson (Josh Czajkowski kick), 8:26	Wake Forest 27–24
Wake Forest – Jimmy Newman 21 yd FG, 4:44	Wake Forest 30–24

=== Maryland ===
	1	2	3	4	Total
Terrapins (2–4)	7	3	7	15	32
Demon Deacons (4–2)	21	14	7	0	42

57 all-time meetings: Maryland 41–15–1
Last meeting: 2008 at Maryland (Maryland 26, Wake Forest 0)

Scoring Play	Score
1st quarter
Wake Forest – Josh Adams 48 yd TD run (Jimmy Newman kick), 12:40	Wake Forest 7–0
Maryland – Davin Megget 1 yd TD run (Nick Ferrara kick), 10:41	Tied 7–7
Wake Forest – Devon Brown 4 yd TD run (Jimmy Newman kick), 5:20	Wake Forest 14–7
Wake Forest – Marshall Williams 10 yard TD pass from Riley Skinner (Jimmy Newman kick), :00	Wake Forest 21–7
2nd quarter
Wake Forest – Chris Givens 32 yard TD pass from Riley Skinner (Jimmy Newman kick), 10:28	Wake Forest 28–7
Maryland – Nick Ferrara 50 yd FG, 7:27	Wake Forest 28–10
Wake Forest – Andre Parker 20 yard TD pass from Riley Skinner (Jimmy Newman kick), 4:49	Wake Forest 35–10
3rd quarter
Maryland – Adrian Cannon 2 yard TD pass from Chris Turner (Nick Ferrara kick), 8:09	Wake Forest 35–17
Wake Forest – Chris Givens 27 yard TD pass from Riley Skinner (Jimmy Newman kick), 4:46	Wake Forest 42–17
4th quarter
Maryland – Adrian Cannon 15 yard TD pass from Chris Turner (Davin Meggett pass from Chris Turner), 11:00	Wake Forest 42–25
Maryland – Torrey Smith 4 yard TD pass from Chris Turner (Nick Ferrara kick), 1:37	Wake Forest 42–32

=== @ Clemson ===
	1	2	3	4	Total
Demon Deacons (4–3)	0	3	0	0	3
Tigers (3–3)	10	21	7	0	38

74 all-time meetings: Clemson 56–17–1
Last meeting: 2008 at Wake Forest (Wake Forest 12, Clemson 7)

Scoring Play	Score
1st quarter
Clemson – Michael Palmer 1 yard TD pass from Kyle Parker (Richard Jackson kick), 12:26	Clemson 7–0
Clemson – Richard Jackson 22 yd FG, 3:34	Clemson 10–0
2nd quarter
Clemson – Kyle Parker 3 yd TD run (Richard Jackson kick), 12:20	Clemson 17–0
Wake Forest – Jimmy Newman 28 yd FG, 3:49	Clemson 17–3
Clemson – C.J. Spiller 66 yd TD run (Richard Jackson kick), 3:37	Clemson 24–3
Clemson – Jamie Harper 3 yd TD run (Richard Jackson kick), 1:06	Clemson 31–3
3rd quarter
Clemson – C.J. Spiller 14 yd TD run (Richard Jackson kick), 6:11	Clemson 38–3

=== @ Navy ===
	1	2	3	4	Total
Demon Deacons (4–4)	0	3	0	7	10
Midshipmen (6–2)	3	3	7	0	13

10 all-time meetings: Wake Forest 7–3
Last meeting: 2008 in Washington DC (Wake Forest 29, Navy 19)

Scoring Play	Score
1st quarter
Navy – Joe Buckley 50 yd FG, 2:52	Navy 3–0
2nd quarter
Wake Forest – Jimmy Newman 40 yd FG, 13:45	Tied 3–3
Navy – Joe Buckley 41 yd FG, 7:26	Navy 6–3
3rd quarter
Navy – Kriss Proctor 40 yd TD run (Joe Buckley kick), 11:23	Navy 13–3
4th quarter
Wake Forest – Devon Brown 15 yard TD pass from Riley Skinner (Jimmy Newman kick), 7:41	Navy 13–10

=== Miami ===
	1	2	3	4	Total
Hurricanes (6–2)	0	14	0	14	28
Demon Deacons (4–5)	10	10	7	0	27

9 all-time meetings: Miami 6–3
Last meeting: 2008 at Miami (Miami 16, Wake Forest 10)

Scoring Play	Score
1st quarter
Wake Forest – Jimmy Newman 23 yd FG, 9:16	Wake Forest 3–0
Wake Forest – Tommy Bohanon 3 yard TD pass from Riley Skinner (Jimmy Newman kick), 2:23	Wake Forest 10–0
2nd quarter
Wake Forest – Riley Skinner 7 yd TD run (Jimmy Newman kick), 10:36	Wake Forest 17–0
Miami – Aldarius Johnson 35 yard TD pass from Jacory Harris (Matt Bosher kick), 9:08	Wake Forest 17–7
Wake Forest – Jimmy Newman 42 yd FG, :42	Wake Forest 20–7
Miami – Damien Berry 3 yard TD run (Matt Bosher kick), :03	Wake Forest 20–14
3rd quarter
Wake Forest – Chris Givens 44 yard TD pass from Riley Skinner (Jimmy Newman kick), 5:38	Wake Forest 27–14
4th quarter
Miami – Tervaris Johnson 2 yard TD pass from Jacory Harris (Matt Bosher kick), 11:47	Wake Forest 27–21
Miami – Travis Benjamin 13 yard TD pass from Jacory Harris (Matt Bosher kick), 1:08	Miami 28–27

=== @ Georgia Tech ===
	1	2	3	4	OT	Total
Demon Deacons (4–6)	0	17	0	7	3	27
Yellow Jackets (9–1)	10	0	7	7	6	30

28 all-time meetings: Georgia Tech 20–8
Last meeting: 2006 in Jacksonville (Wake Forest 9, Georgia Tech 6)

Scoring Play	Score
1st quarter
Georgia Tech – Scott Blair 45 yd FG, 10:52	Georgia Tech 3–0
Georgia Tech – Preston Lyons 31 yard TD run (Scott Blair kick), 5:50	Georgia Tech 10–0
2nd quarter
Wake Forest – Kevin Harris 1 yard TD run (Jimmy Newman kick), 14:05	Georgia Tech 10–7
Wake Forest – Devon Brown 20 yard TD pass from Riley Skinner (Jimmy Newman kick), 8:03	Wake Forest 14–10
Wake Forest – Jimmy Newman 35 yd FG, 2:30	Wake Forest 17–10
3rd quarter
Georgia Tech – Jonathan Dwyer 59 yard TD run (Scott Blair kick), 13:10	Tied 17–17
4th quarter
Georgia Tech – Josh Nesbitt 12 yard TD run (Scott Blair kick), 8:19	Georgia Tech 24–17
Wake Forest – Devon Brown 11 yard TD pass from Riley Skinner (Jimmy Newman kick), 4:27	Tied 24–24
Overtime
Wake Forest – Jimmy Newman 34 yd FG	Wake Forest 27–24
Georgia Tech – Josh Nesbitt 3 yard TD run (no kick attempted)	Georgia Tech 30–27

=== Florida State ===
	1	2	3	4	Total
Seminoles (5–5)	14	17	3	7	41
Demon Deacons (4–7)	7	7	7	7	28

27 all-time meetings: Florida State 21–5–1
Last meeting: 2008 at Florida State (Wake Forest 12, Florida State 3)

Scoring Play	Score
1st quarter
Florida State – Ty Jones 9 yard TD run (Dustin Hopkins kick), 9:24	Florida State 7–0
Wake Forest – Josh Adams 3 yard TD run (Jimmy Newman kick), 2:43	Tied 7–7
Florida State – Jermaine Thomas 6 yard TD run (Dustin Hopkins kick), :19	Florida State 14–7
2nd quarter
Florida State – E.J. Manuel 1 yard TD run (Dustin Hopkins kick), 12:48	Florida State 21–7
Florida State – Dustin Hopkins 47 yd FG, 4:52	Florida State 24–7
Florida State – Greg Reid 68 yard punt return TD (Dustin Hopkins kick), 3:40	Florida State 31–7
Wake Forest – Josh Adams 20 yard TD run (Jimmy Newman kick), 2:12	Florida State 31–14
3rd quarter
Wake Forest – Kevin Harris 12 yard TD run (Jimmy Newman kick), 6:57	Florida State 31–21
Florida State – Dustin Hopkins 42 yd FG, 4:01	Florida State 34–21
4th quarter
Florida State – Jarmon Fortson 7 yard TD pass from E.J. Manuel (Dustin Hopkins kick), 11:04	Florida State 41–21
Wake Forest – Chris Givens 4 yard TD pass from Riley Skinner (Jimmy Newman kick), 3:01	Florida State 41–28

=== @ Duke ===
	1	2	3	4	Total
Demon Deacons (5–7)	14	7	14	10	45
Blue Devils (5–7)	14	3	3	14	34

88 all-time meetings: Duke 53–34–2
Last meeting: 2008 at Wake Forest (Wake Forest 33, Duke 30 ^{OT})

Scoring Play	Score
1st quarter
Duke – Donovan Varner 56 yard TD pass from Thaddeus Lewis (Will Snyderwine kick), 13:56	Duke 7–0
Wake Forest – Devon Brown 28 yard TD pass from Riley Skinner (Jimmy Newman kick), 12:21	Tied 7–7
Duke – Austin Kelly 62 yard TD pass from Thaddeus Lewis (Will Snyderwine kick), 11:10	Duke 14–7
Wake Forest – Chris Givens 54 yard TD pass from Riley Skinner (Jimmy Newman kick), 7:21	Tied 14–14
2nd quarter
Wake Forest – Devon Brown 8 yard TD pass from Riley Skinner (Jimmy Newman kick), 10:50	Wake Forest 21–14
Duke – Will Snyderwine 51 yd FG, 5:21	Wake Forest 21–17
3rd quarter
Wake Forest – Kevin Harris 13 yard TD pass from Riley Skinner (Jimmy Newman kick), 9:46	Wake Forest 28–17
Duke – Will Snyderwine 33 yd FG, 7:10	Wake Forest 28–20
Wake Forest – Marshall Williams 49 yard TD pass from Riley Skinner (Jimmy Newman kick), 5:51	Wake Forest 35–20
4th quarter
Duke – Thaddeus Lewis 1 yard TD run (Will Snyderwine kick), 9:45	Wake Forest 35–27
Wake Forest – Jimmy Newman 44 yd FG, 4:30	Wake Forest 38–27
Wake Forest – Alex Frye 37 yard interception return TD (Jimmy Newman kick), 3:26	Wake Forest 45–27
Duke – Donovan Varner 21 yard TD pass from Thaddeus Lewis (Will Snyderwine kick), 2:31	Wake Forest 45–34

== Personnel ==
=== Coaching staff ===
Position	Name	First year at WFU
Head coach	Jim Grobe	2001
Secondary	Tim Billings	2006
Quarterbacks	Tom Elrod	2003
Defensive ends	Keith Henry	2001
Defensive coordinator / Linebackers	Brad Lambert	2001
Offensive coordinator / Offensive line	Steed Lobotzke	2001
Defensive tackles	Ray McCartney	2001
Assistant head coach / Running backs / Kickers	Billy Mitchell	2001
Tight ends / Fullbacks	Steve Russ	2008
Wide receivers	Brian Knorr	2008

=== Roster ===
Quarterbacks: 10 Turner Faulk – (redshirt) Freshman; 11 Riley Skinner – (redshirt) Senior; 12 Skylar Jones – (redshirt) Sophomore; 13 Ted Stachitas – (redshirt) Freshman; 14 Brendan Cross – Freshman; 15 Ryan McManus – (redshirt) Senior; Running backs: 20 Lovell Jackson – (redshirt) Freshman; 22 Brandon Pendergrass – (redshirt) Sophomore; 23 Kevin Harris – (redshirt) Senior; 25 Josh Harris – Freshman; 25 Robert Smith- Junior; 27 Josh Adams – (redshirt) Junior; 28 Michael Campanaro – Freshman; 34 Willie Dixon – (redshirt) Sophomore; Wide receivers: 2 Chris Givens – (redshirt) Freshman; 3 Devon Brown – (redshirt) Sophomore; 8 Marshall Williams – (redshirt) Junior; 9 Jordan Williams – Junior; 17 Chris Langley – Senior; 18 Danny Dembry – (redshirt) Sophomore; 36 Josh Strickland – Freshman; 81 Terence Davis – (redshirt) Freshman; 82 Gray Mazzone – Freshman; 86 Matt Hartford – Senior; 88 Quan Rucker – Freshman; Fullbacks: 39 Roger Khouri – Freshman; 19 Nick Tabron – Sophomore; 44 Mike Rinfrette – (redshirt) Senior; 48 Anthony Williams – Senior; Tight ends: 43 Spencer Bishop – Freshman; 49 Zach Massey – Freshman; 80 Andrew Parker – Sophomore; 83 Cameron Ford – (redshirt) Sophomore; 85 Ben Wooster – (redshirt) Senior; 87 Ted Randolph – (redshirt) Senior; 89 Matt Muncy – Freshman	Offensive Linemen: 60 Whit Barnes – Freshman; 61 Barrett McMillin – (redshirt) Senior; 62 Doug Weaver – (redshirt) Sophomore; 64 Jeff Griffin – (redshirt) Senior; 66 Chance Raines – Sophomore; 67 Trey Bailey – (redshirt) Senior; 69 Dennis Godfrey – (redshirt) Sophomore; 70 Chris DeGeare – (redshirt) Senior; 71 Ryan Britt – (redshirt) Sophomore; 72 Russell Nenon – (redshirt) Junior; 74 Garrick Williams – (redshirt) Freshman; 75 Michael Hoag – (redshirt) Sophomore; 76 Joe Birdsong – (redshirt) Senior; 77 Devin Bolling – Freshman; 78 Joe Looney – Sophomore; 79 Gabe Irby – (redshirt) Freshman; Linebackers: 26 Jonathon Jones – (redshirt) Senior; 32 Scott Betros – (redshirt) Freshman; 35 Lee Malchow – (redshirt) Junior; 39 Justin Jackson – Freshman; 40 Joey Ehrmann – (redshirt) Freshman; 41 Mike Olson – Freshman; 43 Spencer Bishop – Freshman; 43 Kyle Jarrett – (redshirt) Sophomore; 45 Riley Haynes – (redshirt) Freshman; 46 Matt Woodlief – (redshirt) Junior; 48 Collin Granger – (redshirt) Sophomore; 49 Zach Massey – Freshman; 50 Nikita Whitlock – Freshman; 52 Dominique Midgett – (redshirt) Senior; 53 Joe Hall – (redshirt) Sophomore; 56 Hunter Haynes – (redshirt) Junior; 57 Gelo Orange – (redshirt) Sophomore; 60 Barrett Powell – (redshirt) Freshman; Cornerbacks: 4 Josh Bush – (redshirt) Sophomore; 6 Kenny Okoro – (redshirt) Freshman; 7 Michael Williams – (redshirt) Sophomore; 14 C.J. Washington – (redshirt) Sophomore; 17 Brandon Ghee – (redshirt) Senior; 24 D.J. Jones – Freshman; 29 Dominique Tate – Freshman; 36 Daniel Mack – Freshman; 36 Josh Strickland – Freshman; 37 Morgan Harris – (redshirt) Freshman; 38 Duran Lowe – Freshman	Safeties: 5 Cyhl Quarles – (redshirt) Sophomore; 8 Geoff Wissing – Senior; 10 Junior Petit-Jean – (redshirt) Sophomore; 21 Alex Frye – (redshirt) Junior; 30 John Stamper – (redshirt) Sophomore; Defensive ends: 34 Kevin Smith – (redshirt) Freshman; 49 Derricus Ellis – (redshirt) Freshman; 54 Kris Redding – Freshman; 55 Tristan Dorty – (redshirt) Sophomore; 63 Tyler King – Sophomore; 77 Devin Bolling – Freshman; 90 Will Wright – (redshirt) Sophomore; 91 John Gallagher – Freshman; 93 Frank Souza – Freshman; 97 Kyle Wilber – (redshirt) Sophomore; 98 Zach Thompson – Freshman; Defensive tackles: 51 John Russell – (redshirt) Senior; 73 Steven Chase – Freshman; 92 Bryson Dunmeyer – (redshirt) Freshman; 94 Tripp Russell – (redshirt) Junior; 95 Ramon Booi – (redshirt) Freshman; 96 Boo Robinson – (redshirt) Senior; 99 Michael Lockett – (redshirt) Senior; Placekickers: 37 Shane Popham – (redshirt) Sophomore; 41 Cline Beam – Senior; 82 Jimmy Newman – Freshman; Punters: 24 Alex Wulfeck – Freshman; 37 Shane Popham – (redshirt) Sophomore; 82 Jimmy Newman – Freshman; Long Snappers: 48 Collin Granger – (redshirt) Sophomore; 49 Zach Massey – Freshman; 53 Greg Bechtel – Senior; Kick returners: 2 Chris Givens – (redshirt) Freshman; 3 Devon Brown – (redshirt) Sophomore; 20 Lovell Jackson – (redshirt) Freshman; Punt Returners: 3 Devon Brown – (redshirt) Sophomore

== Statistics ==
=== Scores by quarter ===
	1	2	3	4	OT	Total
Demon Deacons	72	95	70	76	3	316
Opponents	95	78	55	78	9	315
