= Sergio Render =

American football player (born 1986)

No. 66
- Position: Guard

Personal information
- Born: September 13, 1986 (age 40); LaGrange, Georgia, U.S.
- Listed height: 6 ft 3 in (1.91 m)
- Listed weight: 313 lb (142 kg)

Career information
- High school: Newnan (Newnan, Georgia)
- College: Virginia Tech
- NFL draft: 2010: undrafted

Career history
- Tampa Bay Buccaneers (2010)*; Georgia Force (2011)
- * Offseason or practice squad member only

Awards and highlights
- 2× Second-team All-ACC (2008, 2009)
- Stats at ArenaFan.com

Sergio Orlando Render (born September 13, 1986) is an American former football guard who played college football at Virginia Tech. He was considered one of the top prospects available in the 2010 NFL draft, but was not selected by any team. Render was picked up after the draft by the Tampa Bay Buccaneers as an undrafted free agent, but was released after the team signed Keydrick Vincent.

== Early life ==
Render attended Newnan High School in Georgia, where he was a two-way lineman and a two-time all-area honoree. Render graded out at 85 percent in his blocking assignments and recorded over 100 pancake blocks his last two seasons.

Considered a three-star recruit by Rivals.com, Render was listed as the No. 7 center prospect in the nation in 2005. He chose Virginia Tech over Arkansas and Florida State, among others.

== College career ==
After redshirting his initial year at Virginia Tech, Render earned the starting right guard job during the 2006 preseason. He played 663 snaps on offense during the 2006 season, and kept his starting job during the 2007 and 2008 seasons. Following the 2009 Orange Bowl he underwent a shoulder surgery and did not participate in the 2009 off-season workouts or spring practice. The surgery was successful, and Render was at 100% health going into the 2009 NCCA Season. He moved to left guard for the 2009 season and helping the 2009 Hokies football team finish the season with 10 wins and 3 losses (6–2 ACC).

Render was listed at No. 8 on Rivals.com′s preseason interior lineman power ranking in 2009. He was also named to the 2009 Outland Trophy watch list, but that trophy eventually went to Ndamukong Suh. Render, however, was named to the All-ACC Second Team for the second consecutive time.

== Professional career ==
Regarded as the No. 20 offensive guard available by Sports Illustrated, Render went undrafted in the 2010 NFL draft. He was signed by the Tampa Bay Buccaneers, but was released before the 2010 NFL season began. He was then signed by the Arena Football League's Georgia Force.
