= Cordaro Howard =

American gridiron football player (born 1987)

Cord Howard
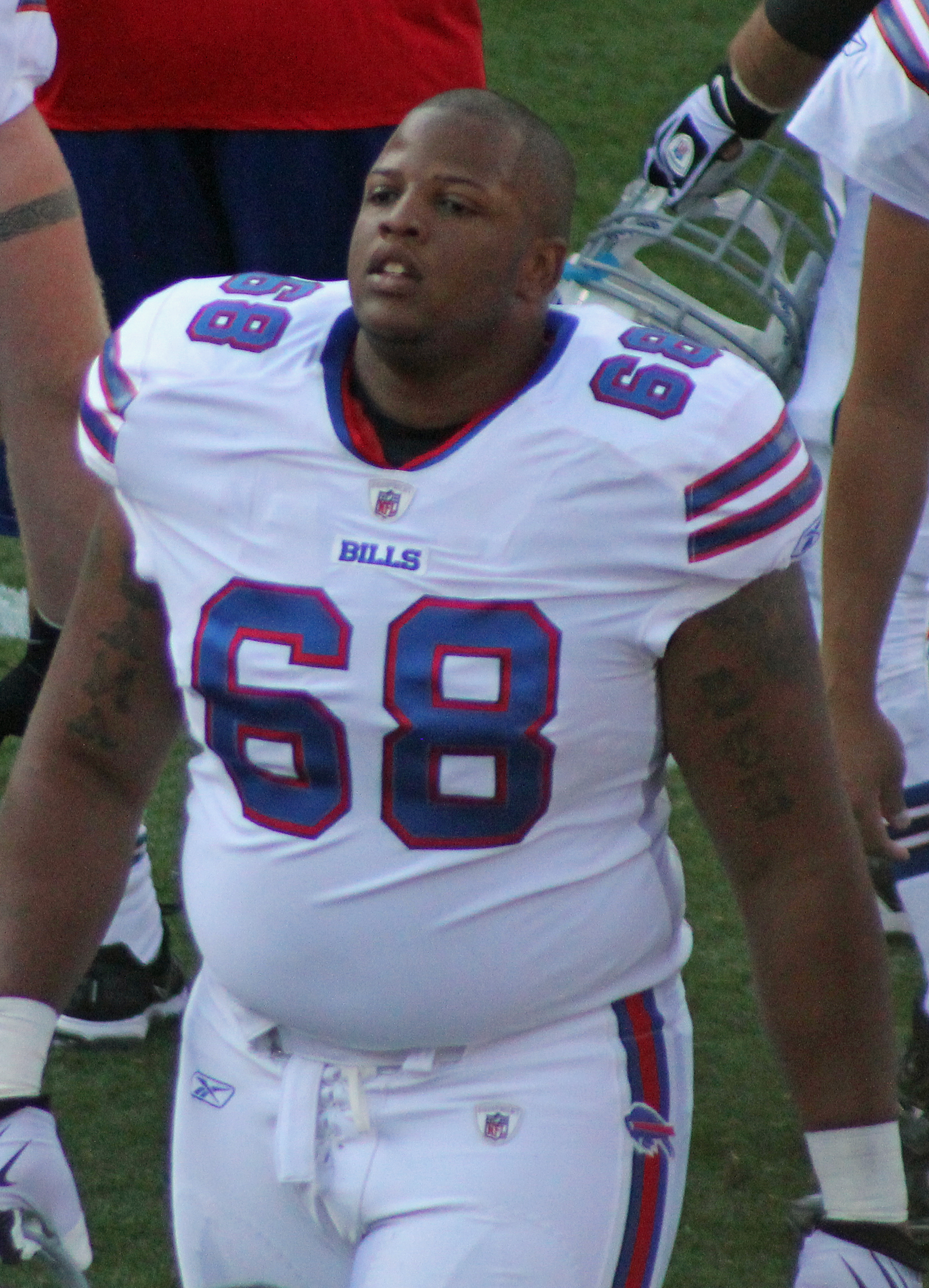
- Howard with the Buffalo Bills in 2011

No. 68, 60, 63, 70
- Position: Guard

Personal information
- Born: July 2, 1987 (age 39); Phenix City, Alabama, U.S.
- Listed height: 6 ft 4 in (1.93 m)
- Listed weight: 314 lb (142 kg)

Career information
- College: Georgia Tech
- NFL draft: 2010: undrafted

Career history
- Buffalo Bills (2010–2011); Baltimore Ravens (2012)*; Omaha Nighthawks (2012); Winnipeg Blue Bombers (2013–2015); Hamilton Tiger-Cats (2016)*
- * Offseason or practice squad member only

Awards and highlights
- First-team All-ACC (2009); Second-team All-ACC (2008)

Career NFL statistics
- Games played: 10
- Games started: 4
- Stats at Pro Football Reference

Cordaro Jerome "Cord" Howard (born July 2, 1987) is an American former professional football player who was a guard in the National Football League (NFL) and Canadian Football League (CFL). After playing college football for the Georgia Tech Yellow Jackets, he was signed by the Buffalo Bills as an undrafted free agent in 2010.

== Professional career ==
=== Buffalo Bills ===
Howard was signed by the Buffalo Bills as an undrafted free agent following the 2010 NFL draft on April 24, 2010. He was placed on injured reserve on December 28. He was released during final roster cuts on September 3, 2011.

=== Baltimore Ravens ===
Howard was signed by the Baltimore Ravens on July 25, 2012. He was released on August 31, 2012.
