= 2009 Virginia Cavaliers football team =

American college football season

2009 Virginia Cavaliers football
- Conference: Atlantic Coast Conference
- Coastal
- Record: 3–9 (2–6 ACC)
- Head coach: Al Groh (9th season)
- Offensive coordinator: Gregg Brandon (1st season)
- Offensive scheme: Spread
- Defensive coordinator: Al Groh (1st season)
- Base defense: 3–4
- Home stadium: Scott Stadium (Capacity: 61,500)

Uniform

2009 Atlantic Coast Conference football standings
	Conf.			Overall
Team	W		L	W		L
Atlantic Division
No. 24 Clemson x	6	–	2	9	–	5
Boston College	5	–	3	8	–	5
Florida State	4	–	4	7	–	6
Wake Forest	3	–	5	5	–	7
NC State	2	–	6	5	–	7
Maryland	1	–	7	2	–	10
Coastal Division
No. 13 Georgia Tech * x$	7	–	1	11	–	3
No. 10 Virginia Tech	6	–	2	10	–	3
No. 19 Miami (FL)	5	–	3	9	–	4
North Carolina *	0	–	4	0	–	5
Duke	3	–	5	5	–	7
Virginia	2	–	6	3	–	9
Championship: Georgia Tech 39, Clemson 34
$ – BCS representative as conference champion; North Carolina vacated 8 wins, including 4 ACC wins.; Rankings from AP Poll

The 2009 Virginia Cavaliers football team represented the University of Virginia in the 2009 NCAA Division I FBS football season as a member of the Coastal Division of the Atlantic Coast Conference (ACC). The Cavaliers were led by ninth-year head coach Al Groh. The previous season, Groh fired his offensive coordinator, his son Mike Groh, and replaced him with Gregg Brandon, who had himself been fired as the head coach at Bowling Green. Brandon installed the spread offense at Virginia. The Cavaliers finished the season 3–9, 2–6 in conference play and failed to qualify for a bowl game. Following the conclusion of the season Virginia dismissed Al Groh as head coach and hired Mike London as his replacement.

== Schedule ==
Date	Time	Opponent	Site	TV	Result	Attendance
September 5	6:00 pm	No. 14 (FCS) William & Mary*	Scott Stadium; Charlottesville, VA	ESPN360	L 14–26	54,587
September 12	3:30 pm	No. 16 TCU*	Scott Stadium; Charlottesville, VA	ESPNU	L 14–30	48,336
September 19	3:30 pm	at Southern Miss*	M. M. Roberts Stadium; Hattiesburg, MS	CBSCS	L 34–37	31,170
October 3	12:00 pm	at North Carolina	Kenan Stadium; Chapel Hill, NC (South's Oldest Rivalry)	Raycom	W 16–3	57,500
October 10	3:30 pm	Indiana*	Scott Stadium; Charlottesville, VA	ESPN360	W 47–7	45,371
October 17	4:00 pm	at Maryland	Byrd Stadium; College Park, MD (rivalry)	ESPNU	W 20–9	44,864
October 24	12:00 pm	No. 13 Georgia Tech	Scott Stadium; Charlottesville, VA	Raycom	L 9–34	43,016
October 31	3:30 pm	Duke	Scott Stadium; Charlottesville, VA	ESPN360	L 17–28	41,713
November 7	12:00 pm	at No. 17 Miami (FL)	Land Shark Stadium; Miami Gardens, FL	Raycom	L 17–52	48,350
November 14	3:30 pm	Boston College	Scott Stadium; Charlottesville, VA	ESPN360	L 10–14	44,324
November 21	3:30 pm	at No. 19 Clemson	Memorial Stadium; Clemson, SC	ABC/ESPN	L 21–34	77,568
November 28	3:30 pm	No. 14 Virginia Tech	Scott Stadium; Charlottesville, VA (Commonwealth Cup)	ABC/ESPN	L 13–42	58,555
*Non-conference game; Rankings from Coaches' Poll released prior to the game; All times are in Eastern time

== Personnel ==
2009 Virginia Cavaliers football team roster
Players
Coaches
Offense

Pos.	#	Name	Class
WR		Vic Hall
WR		Quintin Hunter	Fr
QB		Jameel Sewell
QB		Marc Verica

Defense

Pos.	#	Name	Class

Special teams

Pos.	#	Name	Class

Head coach

- Al Groh

Coordinators/assistant coaches

- Chad Wilt (Defensive line/special teams coordinator)

Legend

- (C) Team captain
- (S) Suspended
- (I) Ineligible
- Injured
- Redshirt
