= 2009 Florida State Seminoles football team =

American college football season

2009 Florida State Seminoles football

Gator Bowl champion

Gator Bowl, W 33–21 vs. West Virginia
- Conference: Atlantic Coast Conference
- Atlantic Division
- Record: 7–6 (4–4 ACC)
- Head coach: Bobby Bowden (34th season)
- Offensive coordinator: Jimbo Fisher (3rd season)
- Offensive scheme: Pro-style
- Defensive coordinator: Mickey Andrews (26th season)
- Base defense: 4–3
- Captains: Christian Ponder; Jamie Robinson; Recardo Wright
- Home stadium: Doak Campbell Stadium

2009 Atlantic Coast Conference football standings
	Conf.			Overall
Team	W		L	W		L
Atlantic Division
No. 24 Clemson x	6	–	2	9	–	5
Boston College	5	–	3	8	–	5
Florida State	4	–	4	7	–	6
Wake Forest	3	–	5	5	–	7
NC State	2	–	6	5	–	7
Maryland	1	–	7	2	–	10
Coastal Division
No. 13 Georgia Tech * x$	7	–	1	11	–	3
No. 10 Virginia Tech	6	–	2	10	–	3
No. 19 Miami (FL)	5	–	3	9	–	4
North Carolina *	0	–	4	0	–	5
Duke	3	–	5	5	–	7
Virginia	2	–	6	3	–	9
Championship: Georgia Tech 39, Clemson 34
$ – BCS representative as conference champion; North Carolina vacated 8 wins, including 4 ACC wins.; Rankings from AP Poll

The 2009 Florida State Seminoles football team represented the Florida State University as a member of the Atlantic Coast Conference (ACC) during the 2008 NCAA Division I FBS football season. Led by Bobby Bowden in his 34th and final season as head coach, the Seminoles compiled an overall record of 7–6 with a mark of 4–4 in conference play, placing third in the ACC's Atlantic Division. Florida State was invited to the Gator Bowl, where the Seminoles defeated West Virginia. The team played home games at Doak Campbell Stadium in Tallahassee, Florida.

Bowden retired at the end the year after leading Florida State to 33 consecutive winning seasons. Offensive coordinator Jimbo Fisher was named his successor.

== Schedule ==
Date	Time	Opponent	Rank	Site	TV	Result	Attendance
September 7	8:00 p.m.	Miami (FL)	No. 18	Doak Campbell Stadium; Tallahassee, FL (rivalry)	ESPN	L 34–38	81,077
September 12	6:00 p.m.	No. 23 (FCS) Jacksonville State*		Doak Campbell Stadium; Tallahassee, FL	ESPN360	W 19–9	71,420
September 19	7:00 p.m.	at No. 9 BYU*		LaVell Edwards Stadium; Provo, UT	Versus	W 54–28	64,209
September 26	12:00 p.m.	South Florida*	No. 18	Doak Campbell Stadium; Tallahassee, FL	ESPNU	L 7–17	83,524
October 3	3:30 p.m.	at Boston College		Alumni Stadium; Chestnut Hill, MA (College GameDay)	ABC, ESPN2	L 21–28	40,029
October 10	8:00 p.m.	No. 23 Georgia Tech		Doak Campbell Stadium; Tallahassee, FL	ESPN2	L 44–49	76,292
October 22	8:00 p.m.	at North Carolina		Kenan Memorial Stadium; Chapel Hill, NC	ESPN	W 30–27	58,000
October 31	12:00 p.m.	NC State^{†}		Doak Campbell Stadium; Tallahassee, FL	Raycom	W 45–42	67,712
November 7	7:45 p.m.	at Clemson		Memorial Stadium; Clemson, SC (rivalry)	ESPN	L 24–40	76,656
November 14	12:00 p.m.	at Wake Forest		BB&T Field; Winston-Salem, NC	ESPNU	W 41–28	33,411
November 21	12:00 p.m.	Maryland		Doak Campbell Stadium; Tallahassee, FL	Raycom	W 29–26	66,042
November 28	3:30 p.m.	at No. 1 Florida*		Ben Hill Griffin Stadium; Gainesville, FL (rivalry), College GameDay)	CBS	L 10–37	90,907
January 1	1:00 p.m.	vs. No. 17 West Virginia*		Jacksonville Municipal Stadium; Jacksonville, FL (Gator Bowl)	CBS	W 33–21	84,129
*Non-conference game; ^{†}Homecoming; Rankings from AP Poll released prior to the game; All times are in Eastern time

== Rankings ==
Ranking movements Legend: ██ Increase in ranking ██ Decrease in ranking — = Not ranked
	Week																
Poll	Pre	1	2	3	4	5	6	7	8	9	10	11	12	13	14	15	Final
AP	18	—	—	18	—	—	—	—	—	—	—	—	—	—	—	—	—
Coaches	19	—	—	25	—	—	—	—	—	—	—	—	—	—	—	—	—
Harris	Not released				—	—	—	—	—	—	—	—	—	—	—	—	Not released
BCS	Not released							—	—	—	—	—	—	—	—	—	Not released

== Game summaries ==
=== Miami (FL) ===
	1	2	3	4	Total
Miami	7	7	3	21	38
#19 Florida State	7	3	13	11	34

Miami's defense stops Florida St. to back up Harris' final TD drive

=== Jacksonville State ===
	1	2	3	4	Total
Jacksonville State	6	3	0	0	9
Florida State	7	0	0	12	19

Florida State steals win from lower-division Jacksonville State

=== BYU ===
	1	2	3	4	Total
Florida State	7	23	14	10	54
#9 BYU	0	14	7	7	28

Ponder drives Seminoles to decisive win over No. 7 Cougars

=== South Florida ===
	1	2	3	4	Total
South Florida	0	14	0	3	17
#25 Florida State	0	0	0	7	7

Daniels steps in for injured Grothe, lifts USF to first ever win over FSU.

=== Boston College ===
	1	2	3	4	Total
Florida State	3	3	7	8	21
Boston College	7	14	0	7	28

BC blows 18-point lead, barely holds off FSU.

=== Georgia Tech ===
	1	2	3	4	Total
#23 Georgia Tech	14	14	14	7	49
Florida State	14	21	3	6	44

Nesbitt, Yellow Jackets hand third straight loss to Bowden's Seminoles.

=== North Carolina ===
	1	2	3	4	Total
Florida State	3	3	14	10	30
North Carolina	14	3	7	3	27

Ponder rallies Seminoles from deficit to knock off North Carolina.

=== NC State ===
	1	2	3	4	Total
NC State	7	14	7	14	42
Florida State	7	14	10	14	45

Florida St. edges NC State late in barnburner

=== Clemson ===
	1	2	3	4	Total
Florida State	17	0	7	0	24
Clemson	6	8	7	19	40

Spiller rushes for 165 yards, touchdown as Clemson routs Florida St.

- FSU starting quarterback Christian Ponder was injured in the 4th quarter and had to leave the game. His injury required surgery and he did not return to participation until the teams non-contact drills in the spring of 2010.
- Redshirt Freshman E.J. Manuel took over for the injured Ponder, getting his first start the following week against Wake Forest.

=== Wake Forest ===
	1	2	3	4	Total
Florida State	14	17	3	7	41
Wake Forest	7	7	7	7	28

Thomas, Manuel help Florida State roll past Wake

=== Maryland ===
	1	2	3	4	Total
Maryland	0	13	0	13	26
Florida State	7	7	0	15	29

Florida State edges Maryland on last-minute TD to become bowl eligible

=== Florida ===
	1	2	3	4	Total
Florida State	0	0	3	7	10
#1 Florida	7	17	6	7	37

Tebow accounts for five TDs in final home game as a Gator

=== West Virginia—Gator Bowl ===
	1	2	3	4	Total
#16 West Virginia	14	0	0	7	21
Florida State	3	10	10	10	33

- The final game for Bobby Bowden, Mickey Andrews and Chuck Amato.

Bowden goes out a winner as Seminoles dispatch Mountaineers

== Personnel ==
=== Recruits ===
College recruiting
Name	Hometown	School	Height	Weight	40^{‡}	Commit date
Justin Bright; DB	Duncan, South Carolina	Byrnes HS	6 ft 1 in (1.85 m)	184 lb (83 kg)	4.5	May 20, 2008
Justin Bright; DB	Recruit ratings: Scout: Rivals: (75)					
Christopher Hord; OL	Panama City Beach, Florida	J.R Arnold HS	6 ft 4 in (1.93 m)	317 lb (144 kg)	5.2	May 3, 2008
Christopher Hord; OL	Recruit ratings: Scout: Rivals: (77)					
Gerald Demps; DB	Valdosta, Georgia	Lowndes HS	5 ft 10 in (1.78 m)	190 lb (86 kg)	4.6	Apr 9, 2008
Gerald Demps; DB	Recruit ratings: Scout: Rivals: (82)					
Willie Downs; ATH	Tallahassee, Florida	Godby HS	6 ft 2 in (1.88 m)	192 lb (87 kg)	N/A	Feb 11, 2008
Willie Downs; ATH	Recruit ratings: Scout: Rivals: (80)					
Jajuan Harley; DB	Tallahassee, Florida	Rickards HS	6 ft 2 in (1.88 m)	190 lb (86 kg)	4.4	Feb 13, 2008
Jajuan Harley; DB	Recruit ratings: Scout: Rivals: (76)					
Willie Haulstead; WR	Titusville, Florida	Titusville HS	6 ft 3 in (1.91 m)	210 lb (95 kg)	4.5	May 15, 2008
Willie Haulstead; WR	Recruit ratings: Scout: Rivals: (79)					
Dan Hicks; TE	Oxford, Mississippi	Oxford HS	6 ft 4 in (1.93 m)	242 lb (110 kg)	4.6	Feb 4, 2009
Dan Hicks; TE	Recruit ratings: Scout: Rivals: (76)					
Dustin Hopkins; K	Houston, Texas	Clear Lake HS	6 ft 2 in (1.88 m)	175 lb (79 kg)	4.6	Jun 25, 2008
Dustin Hopkins; K	Recruit ratings: Scout: Rivals: (80)					
Brandon Jenkins; DE	Tallahassee, Florida	Florida State University School	6 ft 3 in (1.91 m)	218 lb (99 kg)	4.7	Mar 1, 2008
Brandon Jenkins; DE	Recruit ratings: Scout: Rivals: (80)					
Demonte McAllister; DE	Tampa, Florida	Alonso HS	6 ft 3 in (1.91 m)	263 lb (119 kg)	N/A	Jul 20, 2008
Demonte McAllister; DE	Recruit ratings: Scout: Rivals: (83)					
Jacobbi McDaniel; DT	Greenville, Florida	Madison HS	6 ft 0 in (1.83 m)	267 lb (121 kg)	4.8	Feb 7, 2008
Jacobbi McDaniel; DT	Recruit ratings: Scout: Rivals: (91)					
C.J. Mizell; LB	Tallahassee, Florida	Leon HS	6 ft 2 in (1.88 m)	212 lb (96 kg)	4.5	Feb 20, 2008
C.J. Mizell; LB	Recruit ratings: Scout: Rivals: (79)					
Henry Orelus; OL	Belle Glade, Florida	Glades Central HS	6 ft 3 in (1.91 m)	292 lb (132 kg)	5.5	Jul 25, 2008
Henry Orelus; OL	Recruit ratings: Scout: Rivals: (76)					
Aubrey Phillips; OL	Olive Branch, Mississippi	Olive Branch HS	6 ft 6 in (1.98 m)	310 lb (140 kg)	5.1	Feb 3, 2009
Aubrey Phillips; OL	Recruit ratings: Scout: Rivals: (75)					
John Prior; OL	Portsmouth, Ohio	Portsmouth HS	6 ft 6 in (1.98 m)	283 lb (128 kg)	N/A	Jul 12, 2008
John Prior; OL	Recruit ratings: Scout: Rivals: (76)					
Lonnie Pryor; RB	Okeechobee, Florida	Okeechobee HS	6 ft 1 in (1.85 m)	195 lb (88 kg)	4.5	Jul 26, 2008
Lonnie Pryor; RB	Recruit ratings: Scout: Rivals: (79)					
Greg Reid; DB	Valdosta, Georgia	Lowndes HS	5 ft 9 in (1.75 m)	175 lb (79 kg)	4.5	Feb 3, 2008
Greg Reid; DB	Recruit ratings: Scout: Rivals: (85)					
Xavier Rhodes; WR	Miami, Florida	Miami Norland HS	6 ft 2 in (1.88 m)	187 lb (85 kg)	4.47	Jul 26, 2008
Xavier Rhodes; WR	Recruit ratings: Scout: Rivals: (77)					
Will Secord; QB	Frisco, Texas	Wakeland HS	6 ft 3 in (1.91 m)	205 lb (93 kg)	4.7	Feb 3, 2009
Will Secord; QB	Recruit ratings: Scout: Rivals: (75)					
Rodney Smith; WR	Miami, Florida	Archbishop Carroll HS	6 ft 6 in (1.98 m)	200 lb (91 kg)	4.53	Jul 26, 2008
Rodney Smith; WR	Recruit ratings: Scout: Rivals: (80)					
Bryan Stork; TE	Vero Beach, Florida	Vero Beach HS	6 ft 4 in (1.93 m)	260 lb (120 kg)	5.0	May 23, 2008
Bryan Stork; TE	Recruit ratings: Scout: Rivals: (76)					
Chris Thompson; RB	Greenville, Florida	Madison HS	5 ft 8 in (1.73 m)	175 lb (79 kg)	4.4	Feb 28, 2008
Chris Thompson; RB	Recruit ratings: Scout: Rivals: (79)					
Overall recruit ranking:
‡ Refers to 40-yard dash; Note: In many cases, Scout, Rivals, 247Sports, On3, and ESPN may conflict in their listings of height, weight and 40 time.; In these cases, the average was taken. ESPN grades are on a 100-point scale.; Sources: "Florida State 2009 Football Commitments". Rivals.; "2009 Florida State Commits". Scout.; "2009 Player Commitments – Florida State". ESPN.; "Scout.com Team Recruiting Rankings". Scout.; "2009 Team Ranking". Rivals.com.

== Statistics ==
=== Team ===
	Team	Opp
Scoring	338	332
Points per game	30.73	30.18
First downs		
Rushing		
Passing		
Penalty		
Total offense		
Avg per play		
Avg per game		
Fumbles-lost		
Penalties-yards		
Avg per game		

	Team	Opp
Punts-yards		
Avg per punt		
Time of possession/game		
3rd down conversions		
4th down conversions		
Touchdowns scored		
Field goals-attempts-long		
PAT-attempts		
Attendance		
Games/avg per game		

==== Scores by quarter ====
- Updated after the Maryland game on November 21.

	1	2	3	4	Total
Florida State	86	81	71	100	338
Opponents	68	111	52	101	332

=== Offense ===
==== Passing ====
Name	GP-GS	Effic	Att-Cmp-Int	Pct	Yds	TD	Lng	YPA
Christian Ponder	9–9	147.70	330–227–7	68.8%	2717	14	98	8.23
E.J. Manuel	7–4	124.7	106–69–6	65.1%	817	2	43	8.11
Total	13–13	141.8	437–296–13	67.7%	3147	16	98	8.22
Opponents								

==== Rushing ====
Name	Games Played	Carries	Yards	Fumbles Lost	YPC	TD	Long	Avg/Game
Jermaine Thomas	11	163	832	0	5.1	9	54	62.73
Ty Jones	6	51	251	0	4.9	5	47	41.83
E.J. Manuel	7	44	195	0	4.4	2	24	19.8
Christian Ponder	9	72	179	0	2.5	2	30	19.89
Lonnie Pryor	9	27	156	0	5.8	4	50	15.11
Chris Thompson	8	23	120	0	5.2	2	49	12.5
Bert Reed	11	18	94	0	5.2	2	42	6.82
Louis Givens	6	8	58	0	7.3	1	15	9
Tavares Pressley	3	9	40	0	4.4	0	12	13.33
Rodney Hudson	11	1	9	0	9	0	9	0.82
Taiwan Easterling	10	2	8	0	4	0	7	0.10
Jarmon Fortson	11	1	4	0	4	0	4	0.36
Rod Owens	11	1	3	0	3	0	3	0.27
Total	11	352	1635	0	4.6	24	54	148.64
Opponents								

==== Receiving ====
Name	GP-GS	Rec	Yds	Avg	TD	Long	Avg/G
Rod Owens							
Bert Reed							
Jarmon Fortson							
Taiwan Easterling							
Richard Goodman							
Caz Piurowski							
Lonnie Pryor							
Jermaine Thomas							
Beau Reliford							
Louis Givens							
Ty Jones							
Chris Thompson							
Willie Haulstead							
Rodney Smith							
Ja'Baris Little							
Total							
Opponents							

=== Defense ===
Name	GP	Tackles				Sacks	Pass defense		Interceptions				Fumbles		Blkd Kick
Name	GP	Solo	Ast	Total	TFL-Yds	No-Yds	BrUp	QBH	No.-Yds	Avg	TD	Long	Rcv-Yds	FF	Blkd Kick
Total															

=== Special teams ===
Name	Punting								Kickoffs				
Name	No.	Yds	Avg	Long	TB	FC	I20	Blkd	No.	Yds	Avg	TB	OB
Dustin Hopkins													
Name													
Total													

Name	Punt returns					Kick returns				
Name	No.	Yds	Avg	TD	Long	No.	Yds	Avg	TD	Long
Name										
Total										
