= 2009 ACC Championship Game =

2009 Dr. Pepper ACC Championship Game
- Conference Championship
- ACC Championship logo
Georgia Tech Yellow Jackets	Clemson Tigers
(10–2)	(8–4)
39	34
Head coach: Paul Johnson	Head coach: Dabo Swinney
AP / Coaches / BCS; 12 / 12 / 10	AP / Coaches / BCS; 25 / NR / NR
	1	2	3	4	Total
Georgia Tech	3	13	17	6	39
Clemson	7	6	7	14	34
- Date: December 5, 2009
- Season: 2009
- Stadium: Raymond James Stadium
- Location: Tampa, Florida
- MVP: C. J. Spiller
- Favorite: Georgia Tech by 1
- Referee: Jeff Flanagan
- Halftime show: Dr. Pepper Throw for Scholarship Dough
- Attendance: 42,815

United States TV coverage
- Network: ESPN
- Announcers: Brad Nessler play-by-play Todd Blackledge color Erin Andrews sideline
- Nielsen ratings: 1.6

The 2009 ACC Championship Game was a college football game between the Georgia Tech Yellow Jackets and the Clemson Tigers. The game, sponsored by Dr. Pepper, was the final regular-season contest of the 2009 college football season for the Atlantic Coast Conference. Georgia Tech defeated Clemson, winning the Atlantic Coast Conference football championship, 39–34.

The Georgia Tech Yellow Jackets were selected to represent the Coastal Division by virtue of a 7–1 record in conference play and a 10–2 record overall. Representing the Atlantic Division was Clemson, which had an 8–4 record (6–2 ACC). The game was a rematch of a contest played September 10 in Atlanta. In that first game, Georgia Tech won a close 30–27 matchup.

The game was held at Raymond James Stadium in Tampa, Florida on December 5, 2009. Tampa had been chosen to host the game after poor attendance at the game's previous location, Jacksonville, Florida, led conference officials to seek an alternative. The 2009 championship was the last to be hosted in Tampa, as the game moved to Charlotte, North Carolina in 2010.

From the start of the game, the 2009 ACC championship had a large amount of offense. Throughout the contest, neither team punted: Every offensive drive ended in a score or a turnover. Clemson scored first, a touchdown on its opening drive, and held a 7–3 lead at the end of the first quarter. In the second quarter, Georgia Tech scored 13 points to Clemson's six, and the Yellow Jackets entered halftime with a 16–13 lead. They extended that lead in the third quarter, scoring 17 points to Clemson's lone touchdown and extra point. In the fourth quarter, Clemson closed the gap and took a 34–33 lead with 6:11 remaining, but Georgia Tech drove down the field and scored a touchdown with 1:20 remaining, giving the Yellow Jackets a 39–34 lead that was the game's final margin. In recognition of his significant performance despite the loss, Clemson running back C. J. Spiller was named the game's most valuable player.

By winning, Georgia Tech earned a spot in the 2010 Orange Bowl football game, and Clemson was selected for the 2009 Music City Bowl. Several players that participated in the ACC championship later played in postseason all-star games and were later selected in the 2010 NFL draft.

== Selection process ==
The ACC Championship Game features the winners of the Coastal and Atlantic divisions of the Atlantic Coast Conference. In the early 2000s, the conference underwent an expansion to add three former Big East members: the University of Miami and Virginia Tech in 2004, and Boston College in 2005. With the addition of a twelfth team, the ACC was allowed to hold a conference championship game under National Collegiate Athletic Association (NCAA) rules.

The inaugural 2005 game featured a Florida State win over Virginia Tech, 27–22. In 2006, two different teams made their first appearances in the game, which was held in Jacksonville, Florida. Wake Forest defeated Georgia Tech, 9–6. In 2007, one team new to the championship game and championship-game veteran featured in the contest as Virginia Tech faced off against Boston College. The game resulted in a 30–16 Virginia Tech victory. In 2008, Virginia Tech and Boston College again played in the championship game. Virginia Tech won the rematch, 30–12.

=== Site selection ===
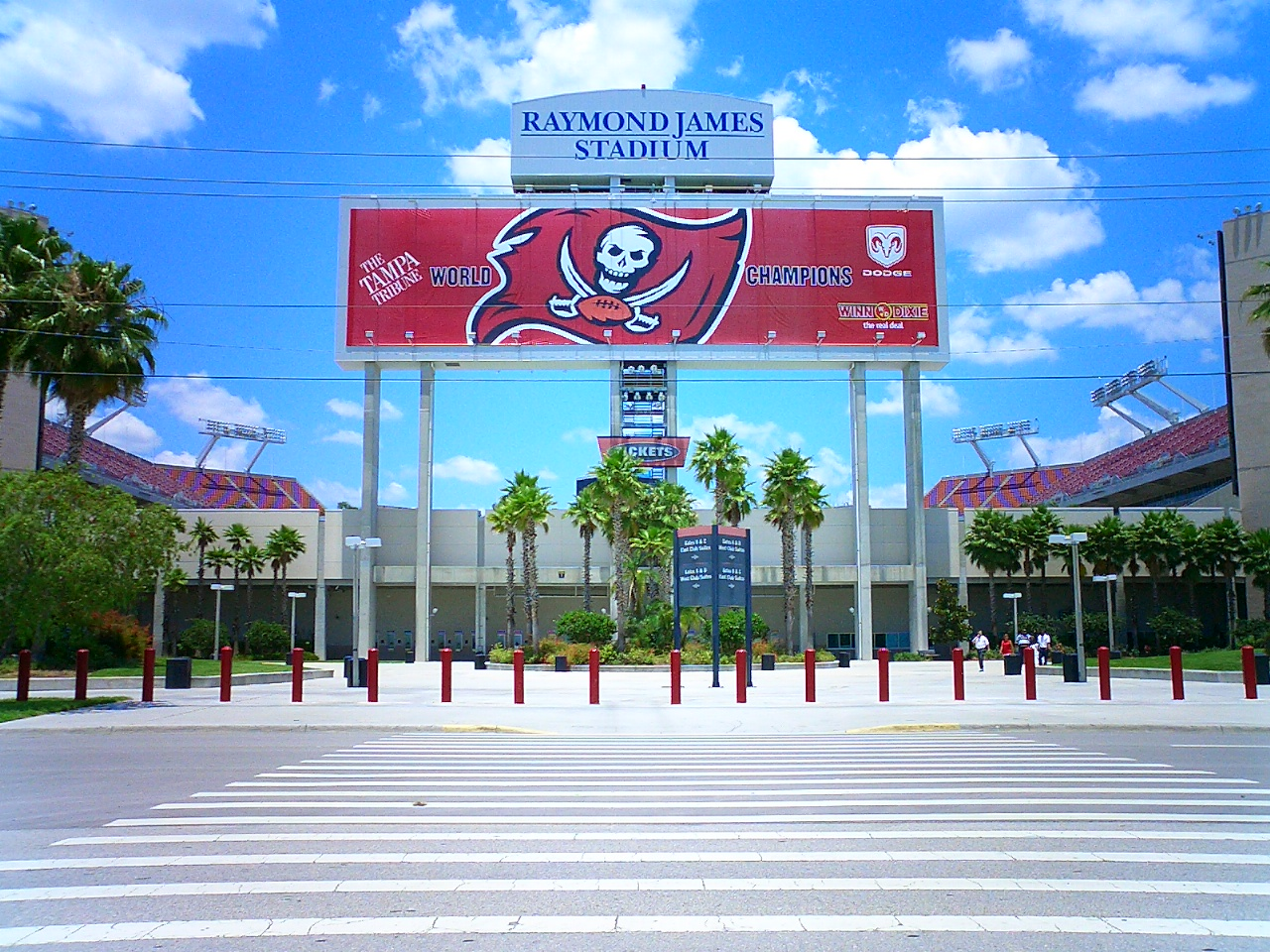
Raymond James Stadium in Tampa, Florida

Before the 2007 game, cities other than Jacksonville (site of the 2007 ACC Championship Game) presented their plans to be the site of the 2008 ACC Championship Game. After poor attendance in the ACC Championship Game at Jacksonville for the second straight year, ACC officials and representatives of the conference's member schools elected not to extend the Gator Bowl Association's contract to manage and host the game for another year. On December 12, less than two weeks after Jacksonville had hosted the 2007 ACC Championship Game, the ACC announced that Tampa, Florida would host the game in 2008 and 2009 and Charlotte, North Carolina would host the game in 2010 and 2011.

The cities were chosen based on bids presented to the ACC and its member schools. Each city requested and was granted a two-year contract. Tampa was chosen as the site of the 2008 game because Charlotte was scheduled to hold the annual convention of the Association for Career and Technical Education at the same time as the game, and adequate hotel space would not be ready in time for the two events. As a result, Charlotte's two-year span of hosting the game was pushed back to 2010.

=== Team selection ===
2009 Atlantic Coast Conference football standings
	Conf.			Overall
Team	W		L	W		L
Atlantic Division
No. 24 Clemson x	6	–	2	9	–	5
Boston College	5	–	3	8	–	5
Florida State	4	–	4	7	–	6
Wake Forest	3	–	5	5	–	7
NC State	2	–	6	5	–	7
Maryland	1	–	7	2	–	10
Coastal Division
No. 13 Georgia Tech * x$	7	–	1	11	–	3
No. 10 Virginia Tech	6	–	2	10	–	3
No. 19 Miami (FL)	5	–	3	9	–	4
North Carolina *	0	–	4	0	–	5
Duke	3	–	5	5	–	7
Virginia	2	–	6	3	–	9
Championship: Georgia Tech 39, Clemson 34
$ – BCS representative as conference champion; North Carolina vacated 8 wins, including 4 ACC wins.; Rankings from AP Poll

Before the beginning of the 2009 college football season, the annual poll by media members who cover ACC football predicted Virginia Tech to win the Coastal Division and Florida State to win the Atlantic Division. Virginia Tech received 78 of a possible 87 first-place votes in its division, while Florida State received 56 in the other division. In regards to predicting the championship game's outcome, 69 of the 87 voters chose Virginia Tech to win. Georgia Tech and Clemson were predicted to finish second in the Coastal and Atlantic divisions, respectively.

==== Georgia Tech ====
The Georgia Tech Yellow Jackets entered the 2009 season after a 2008 campaign that saw them finish 9–4, including a season-ending 38–3 loss to the LSU Tigers in the 2008 Chick-fil-A Bowl. Georgia Tech head coach Paul Johnson, entering his second season as head of the Yellow Jackets, had high hopes that Georgia Tech would be able to improve upon its 2008 performance. Others agreed with Johnson's assumption, as the Yellow Jackets were ranked No. 15 in the preseason Associated Press and USA Today coaches' polls.

In Georgia Tech's first game, the Yellow Jackets defeated lightly regarded Jacksonville State, 37–17. Five days later, in Tech's first competitive game of the season, the Yellow Jackets narrowly defeated Clemson, 30–27, on the basis of a fake field goal for a touchdown and a late field goal. One week after the Clemson win, Tech—by then raised to No. 14 in the national polls—suffered its first loss of the season, to No. 20 Miami.

That loss turned out to be Georgia Tech's last to a conference opponent during the 2009 regular season. Nine days after the Miami loss, Georgia Tech defeated No. 22 North Carolina, then followed that with a win over Southeastern Conference foe Mississippi State. Wins over Florida State and No. 4 Virginia Tech followed in subsequent weeks. The latter victory was the Yellow Jackets' first win over a top-five team since 1962 and gave Georgia Tech a lead in the divisional standings. Following the Virginia Tech win, Georgia Tech defeated Virginia, Vanderbilt, Wake Forest (in overtime) and Duke. The Duke victory raised Georgia Tech to 10 wins, the school's first time at that mark since 1990, and the Yellow Jackets were ranked No. 7, their highest position in the national polls since that year. But following the Duke game, the Yellow Jackets faced Georgia in the rivalry known as Clean, Old-Fashioned Hate. During that game, the unranked Georgia Bulldogs upset Tech, 30–24. Though Georgia Tech had clinched its ACC Championship Game slot with the win over Duke, the loss was nevertheless a "huge letdown" for the team.

==== Clemson ====
The Clemson Tigers began the 2009 season after finishing 7–6 in 2008, including a season-ending loss in the 2009 Gator Bowl to Nebraska. Heading into 2010, Clemson returned many of its 2009 players, but faced questions about whether those players would perform better with another year of experience. Also under question was head coach Dabo Swinney, who was beginning his first full season as head coach of the Tigers after assuming control in the seventh game of 2008. Clemson attempted to answer some of the questions about the team's potential in the first game of the season, a 37–14 win against Middle Tennessee State.

Clemson lost its first real test, a conference game at 15th-ranked Georgia Tech, but recovered to win the following week against Boston College. The Boston College win was Clemson's last for almost a month, however, as Clemson lost to nonconference opponent Texas Christian on September 26, then was defeated by ACC divisional foe Maryland.

The two losses, piled upon the loss to Georgia Tech, left Clemson with a 2–3 record. An anonymous report said coach Swinney became involved in a shouting match with a position coach, while players called a private meeting in an effort to turn the team's season around. On October 17, The Tigers rallied from their losing streak by defeating Wake Forest, 38–3, and moved back into the middle of the competition for the Atlantic Division championship. One week after defeating Wake Forest, the Tigers traveled to Miami, Florida, to play the Miami Hurricanes, who were ranked No. 10 in the Bowl Championship Series Poll. The Tigers played the Hurricanes into overtime, then upset Miami with a touchdown, 40–37.

The Miami win tied Clemson for the lead in the division standings with Boston College, whom the Tigers had already defeated and held a head-to-head tiebreaker over. After the Miami game, Clemson defeated nonconference Coastal Carolina, then reeled off three wins over ACC teams. Clemson beat Florida State on November 7, NC State on November 14, and Virginia on November 21. On the same day Clemson defeated Virginia, Boston College was defeated in an ACC game, giving Clemson the Atlantic Division championship outright. After the Virginia game, Clemson faced longtime in-state rival South Carolina. In that game, South Carolina defeated Clemson, ending the Tigers' winning streak just before the ACC Championship Game.

== Pregame buildup ==
Following the last week of regularly scheduled conference games, both teams fell in the national college football polls because of their rivalry losses. Georgia Tech, which had been No. 7 in the Bowl Championship Series Poll, No. 7 in the Associated Press Poll, and No. 7 in the USA Today Coaches' Poll, dropped to No. 10 in the BCS Poll, No. 12 in the AP Poll, and No. 12 in the coaches' poll. Clemson, which had been No. 18 in the BCS, No. 15 in the AP, and No. 16 according to the coaches, dropped out of the BCS and coaches' polls and was No. 25 according to the AP. Spread bettors predicted Georgia Tech would win the game. Various betting organizations favored the Yellow Jackets by one point.

The game was a rematch of an early regular-season contest, but even though Georgia Tech won that game, there were questions about whether the victory would be repeated. Twice before, the two teams matched in the ACC Championship Game had played earlier that season. Both times, the loser of the first matchup won the second. There also were questions about each team's quality because of their losses in rivalry games against Southeastern Conference foes.

== Game summary ==
The 2009 ACC Championship Game kicked off at 8:06 pm EST on December 5, 2009, at Raymond James Stadium in Tampa, Florida. The weather at kickoff was cloudy, with 88 percent humidity, an air temperature of 53 °F (12 °C) and a north wind of 6 miles per hour (9.7 km/h). Approximately 42,815 people were in the stands, according to turnstile attendance figures, out of 57,227 tickets sold. The game also was seen by approximately 2.541 million viewers on ESPN, which broadcast the game with Brad Nessler, Todd Blackledge, and Erin Andrews. The 2.5 million viewers brought the lowest-ever TV rating for an ACC Championship Game, even though the broadcast was the first ACC Championship Game to be played in prime time since 2005. The game's referee was Jeff Flanagan, its umpire was Keith Roden, and its linesman was Mike Owens.

=== First quarter ===
The Clemson Tigers began the game with first possession. After Georgia Tech's kickoff and a short return, the Tigers' offense began work at their 33-yard line. Three short plays advanced the ball to the Clemson 41-yard line and gained the Tigers a first down. On the next play, Clemson running back C. J. Spiller broke free for a 40-yard rush to the Georgia Tech 19-yard line. Two plays later, Clemson quarterback Kyle Parker completed a 15-yard pass to Jacoby Ford. On the next play, Spiller ran forward three yards, across the goal line for a touchdown and the game's first points.

Clemson's post-score kickoff was returned to the Georgia Tech 15-yard line, where the Yellow Jackets began their first offensive possession. On the first two plays of the game, Georgia Tech running back Roddy Jones escaped the Clemson defense for gains of 21 yards and 22 yards, respectively. Those plays advanced the Yellow Jackets to the Clemson 42-yard line, where Georgia Tech began advancing by small gains. In three plays, Georgia Tech gained a first down, but two subsequent plays lost yardage before kicker Scott Blair came onto the field to attempt—and convert—a 48-yard field goal. The score narrowed Clemson's lead to 7–3 with the quarter exactly half elapsed.

The Tigers began their second drive of the game from their 26-yard line and advanced the ball through short gains. The Tigers needed three plays to gain a first down, then running back Andre Ellington advanced 18 yards and into Georgia Tech territory. Clemson could not gain another first down, and kicker Richard Jackson missed a 52-yard field goal attempt. After the miss, Georgia Tech's offense resumed the field. From the Tech 35-yard line, the Yellow Jackets advanced to the Clemson 48-yard line before running back Jonathan Dwyer gained 20 yards to the 28-yard line. Two plays later, as the Yellow Jackets advanced to the 18-yard line, the quarter ended with Clemson leading, 7–3.

=== Second quarter ===
The second quarter began with Georgia Tech facing first down, in possession of the ball at the Clemson 18-yard line. On the first play of the quarter, Dwyer gained 10 yards and a first down with a running play to the Clemson eight-yard line. Three plays later, Dwyer completed the Yellow Jackets' scoring drive with a run into the end zone. The touchdown and extra point gave Georgia Tech its first lead of the game, 10–7, with 13:30 remaining.

Clemson returned Georgia Tech's kickoff to its 43-yard line, but despite the good field position, Clemson was unable to take advantage. On the first play of the drive, Clemson quarterback Parker threw an interception to Georgia Tech defender Dominique Reese, who went out of bounds at the Tech 45-yard line. Georgia Tech's offense returned to the field at that point and began driving down the field. In two plays, Tech passed the 50-yard line. In six more, it penetrated the Clemson 10-yard line. Once there, however, the Yellow Jackets' drive stalled. Three consecutive penalties against Georgia Tech pushed the Yellow Jackets back 20 yards, and Tech was unable to score a touchdown or gain a first down after that setback. Kicker Blair again returned to the field and scored a 49-yard field goal. With 5:35 remaining in the first half, Georgia Tech extended its lead to 13–7.

Clemson's offense returned to the field at its 35-yard line after Georgia Tech's kickoff and a 30-yard return by C. J. Spiller. During the ensuing drive, Spiller was the key player for the Tigers. On five consecutive plays, he received the ball during rushing plays. He gained 3, 13, 6, 2, and 41 yards, respectively, on each of these plays en route to the end zone and a touchdown. Clemson attempted a two-point conversion, but the try failed and the Tigers simply tied the Yellow Jackets, 13–13.

Georgia Tech's offense began the final drive of the first half with 2:55 remaining. The Yellow Jackets started from their 36-yard line and began slowly: Their first play gained no yards, and their second gained eight before a fumble that was recovered by a fellow Yellow Jacket. A short running play gained three yards, enough for a first down, and the drive continued. Consecutive rushing plays gained few yards at a time, and Georgia Tech used its timeouts to stop the game clock and prevent time from running out in the half. A 10-yard pass interference penalty pushed Georgia Tech inside the Clemson 20-yard line, and kicker Blair again converted a field goal. The successful kick gave Georgia Tech a 16–13 lead heading into halftime.

=== Third quarter ===
Because Clemson received the ball to begin the game, Georgia Tech received the ball to begin the second half. Chris Tanner returned the kickoff to the Tech 29-yard line, and the Yellow Jackets began the first offensive drive of the half. Jones opened the drive with a 16-yard run, then the Yellow Jackets converted a fourth down to continue down the field. Six plays after the fourth-down conversion, Tech quarterback Nesbitt ran into the end zone for a touchdown. The following extra point gave Tech a 23–13 lead with 9:12 remaining.

Clemson fielded the following kickoff, and its offense continued with the success it found in its final drive of the first half. As in that drive, C. J. Spiller was a key performer. Clemson's drive began at its 40-yard line, and it took just five plays for the Tigers to score a touchdown. Four of those plays, including the culminating one, came from Spiller, who covered 40 yards during them. Spiller's touchdown cut Georgia Tech's lead to 23–20. But as quickly as Clemson scored, Georgia Tech moved even more quickly. From its 30-yard line, the Yellow Jackets needed only three plays, the keystone coming on a 70-yard throw from Nesbitt to Thomas for a touchdown. With 5:10 remaining in the quarter, the Yellow Jackets restored the 10-point margin, 30–20.

Beginning from their 26-yard line after a kickoff, Clemson attempted to again cut into Tech's lead. The Tigers, again guided by the running offense of Spiller and Jamie Harper, advanced to the 37-yard line, where Parker's passing attack took over. Parker completed two passes before Georgia Tech defender Jerrard Tarrant ran in front of a long throw downfield. He intercepted Parker's pass and returned it 50 yards to the Clemson 28, where Tech's offense began anew. Despite the good field position, Tech was unable to gain a first down but still was within range of a 40-yard field goal from Blair, who extended the Yellow Jackets' lead to 33–20.

With time running out in the third quarter, Clemson's offense entered the field of play at its 28-yard line. After a five-yard penalty for delay of game, the Tigers' Andre Ellington gained 41 yards on two plays, pushing into Georgia Tech territory. Those plays all but exhausted the quarter's remaining moments, however, and the third quarter ended with Georgia Tech still leading, 33–20.

=== Fourth quarter ===
The fourth quarter began with Clemson in possession of the ball and facing second and nine from the Georgia Tech 35-yard line. The Tigers' first two plays of the quarter failed to gain a first down, setting up a critical fourth-down conversion opportunity for them. Rather than attempt a field goal, the Tigers attempted to gain a first down and were successful as Parker completed a seven-yard throw. Though Georgia Tech sacked Parker on a subsequent play, the yardage loss was offset by a pass interference penalty against the Yellow Jackets. One play after the penalty, Spiller ran nine yards for a touchdown. It and the subsequent extra point cut Georgia Tech's lead to 33–27 with 12 minutes remaining in the game.

With a solid lead and time running down in the game, Georgia Tech began a sequence of running plays intended to keep the game clock running while gaining ground. From their 25-yard line, the Yellow Jackets gained 38 yards on seven plays, advancing into Clemson territory in the process. Facing fourth down at the Clemson 37-yard line, the Yellow Jackets attempted to gain a first down rather than kick a long field goal. When they were stopped short of the first-down line, Clemson's offense returned to the field. Spiller again drove the Tigers down the field, opening the drive with a 54-yard run on its first play. Three plays later, Ellington capitalized the drive with a one-yard run for a tying touchdown. The following extra point gave Clemson a one-point lead, 34–33, with 6:11 remaining in the game.

Clemson's post-touchdown kickoff was returned to the Tech 14-yard line, where the Yellow Jackets began their game-winning drive. The offense began slowly; Georgia Tech gained only nine yards in three plays, setting up a crucial fourth-down conversion. A failed try would give Clemson the ball deep in Georgia Tech territory, with little time remaining in the game for Georgia Tech to reply to any score. Instead, the Yellow Jackets converted the fourth down, keeping their drive alive. On the first play after the fourth-down conversion, Nesbitt completed a 21-yard pass to Dwyer, pushing Tech to near midfield. Eight plays later, Dwyer breached the Clemson defense for a 15-yard gain and the go-ahead score. A false start penalty on Georgia Tech's two-point conversion try prevented any extra points, but the touchdown's six points were enough to give Georgia Tech a 39–34 lead.

Clemson received Georgia Tech's kickoff with 1:20 remaining in the game. On the Tigers' first play, they committed a 10-yard penalty. Two incomplete passes followed from Parker, who then completed an 18-yard throw to Xavier Dye. This set up a fourth-and-two for the Tigers, who needed to gain a first down to keep their potential game-winning drive going. Instead, Parker was stymied in his attempt to run for the needed yards, and Clemson turned the ball over on downs. Georgia Tech's offense ran out the remaining seconds on the clock and ensured their 39–34 victory.

== Statistical summary ==
Statistical comparison
	GT	CU
1st downs	28	15
Total yards	469	414
Passing yards	136	91
Rushing yards	333	323
Penalties	5–31	4–30
3rd down conversions	11–18	5–9
4th down conversions	2–3	1–2
Red zone efficiency	5–5	3–3
Turnovers	0	2
Time of possession	37:17	22:43

In recognition of his performance despite a losing effort, Clemson running back C. J. Spiller was named the game's most valuable player. Spiller set several ACC Championship game records: most yards, most yards per carry, most touchdowns, and longest run from scrimmage. Spiller finished the game with 233 rushing yards, more than Georgia Tech's two leading rushers combined. The Yellow Jackets' Jonathan Dwyer had 110 rushing yards and two touchdowns, while Josh Nesbitt rushed for 103 yards and one touchdown.

As quarterback, Georgia Tech's Josh Nesbitt was the top performer. In addition to his rushing performance, Nesbitt completed 9 of 16 pass attempts for 136 yards and one touchdown. On the opposite side of the field, Clemson's Kyle Parker was successful on 10 of his 17 pass attempts for 91 yards, but also had two interceptions, the game's only turnovers. Nesbitt set an ACC Championship Game record for longest pass play with his 70-yard touchdown pass to Demaryius Thomas in the third quarter. The two teams also set records for total offense: Georgia Tech's 469 total yards and Clemson's 414 total yards each broke the previous record for total offense, as did each team's rushing total break the previous team rushing record.

On defense, Clemson defensive end Da’Quan Bowers led all defenders with 11 total tackles, including one for loss. Bowers' performance was a personal best for him and was the second-most in ACC Championship Game history. For Georgia Tech, Mario Edwards was the leading tackler with seven, including two assisted tackles. Tech's Jerrard Tarrant, who had five tackles, the second-most on the team, also had one interception and returned it 50 yards. The interception and return, Tarrant's first of the season, was the longest in ACC Championship Game history. Georgia Tech's other interception was fielded by Dominique Reese, for no return.

== Postgame effects ==
Georgia Tech's win brought it to a record of 11–2, while Clemson's loss dropped it to 8–5. The win ensured Georgia Tech's first outright conference championship since 1990, and as a reward for winning the conference, Georgia Tech received a spot in the 2010 Orange Bowl, a Bowl Championship Series game. In that game, the Iowa Hawkeyes defeated the Yellow Jackets, 24–14. Clemson also was selected to participate in a postseason bowl game. The Music City Bowl, played in Nashville, Tennessee, selected the Tigers to play against the Kentucky Wildcats. In that game, the Tigers defeated the Wildcats, 21–13.

== Vacated ==
On July 14, 2011, Georgia Tech was forced to vacate the win due to an NCAA investigation. The NCAA accused Tech of fielding an ineligible player during the game, and although they were unable to obtain evidence that an ineligible player had been played, the NCAA concluded that the investigation had been hampered by Georgia Tech's administration. This was taken as evidence of wrongdoing, and penalties for playing an ineligible player were imposed.

== See also ==
- ACC Championship Game
