= Greg Boone =

American football player (born 1986)

No. 36
- Position: Fullback

Personal information
- Born: January 14, 1986 (age 40); Chesapeake, Virginia, U.S.
- Listed height: 6 ft 3 in (1.91 m)
- Listed weight: 289 lb (131 kg)

Career information
- High school: Oscar F. Smith (Chesapeake, Virginia)
- College: Virginia Tech

Career history
- Milwaukee Mustangs (2011)

Awards and highlights
- Second-team All-ACC (2009); Bowl games: 2009 Orange Bowl

Career AFL statistics
- Rush attempts: 5
- Rushing yards: 12
- Receptions: 3
- Receiving yards: 19
- Stats at ArenaFan.com

Greg Boone (born September 14, 1986) is an American former football fullback. He originally went to Virginia Tech as a quarterback and made the move to tight end during the 2006 season. He still received time as a quarterback, primarily in the "Wild Turkey" formation, Virginia Tech's version of the Wildcat formation.

== High school ==
Boone played safety and quarterback in high school. He was ranked by Rivals.com as the No. 36 athlete in the country and twelfth in the state of Virginia. During his senior year, he had 70 completions out of 120 attempts, 1,400 yards passing, three interceptions and eight rushing Touchdowns.

== College ==
=== 2005–2006 ===
Boone was redshirted his first year at Virginia Tech, and spent the year working with the scout team. He won "Super Iron Hokie" honors, a team award for the weight room.

=== 2006–2007 ===
After the redshirt Boone was moved from Quarterback to Tight End. He made his first start against Northeastern for 39 plays. He caught one pass for five yards. He made his first college touchdown in a game against North Carolina after catching a 41 yard pass. During a game against Kent State, he suffered an ankle injury 13 plays into the game and ended up missing the game against Wake Forest. He finished the season with five catches, sixty-eight yards, and one touchdown. During the spring practices, he won the team most improved award.

=== 2008–2009 ===
Boone started every game of the 2007–2008 season except for one. After the game against the Florida State Seminoles, Quarterbacks Sean Glennon and Tyrod Taylor suffered high ankle sprains, and Boone finished the game as Quarterback.
