= Jason Fox (American football) =

American football player (born 1988)

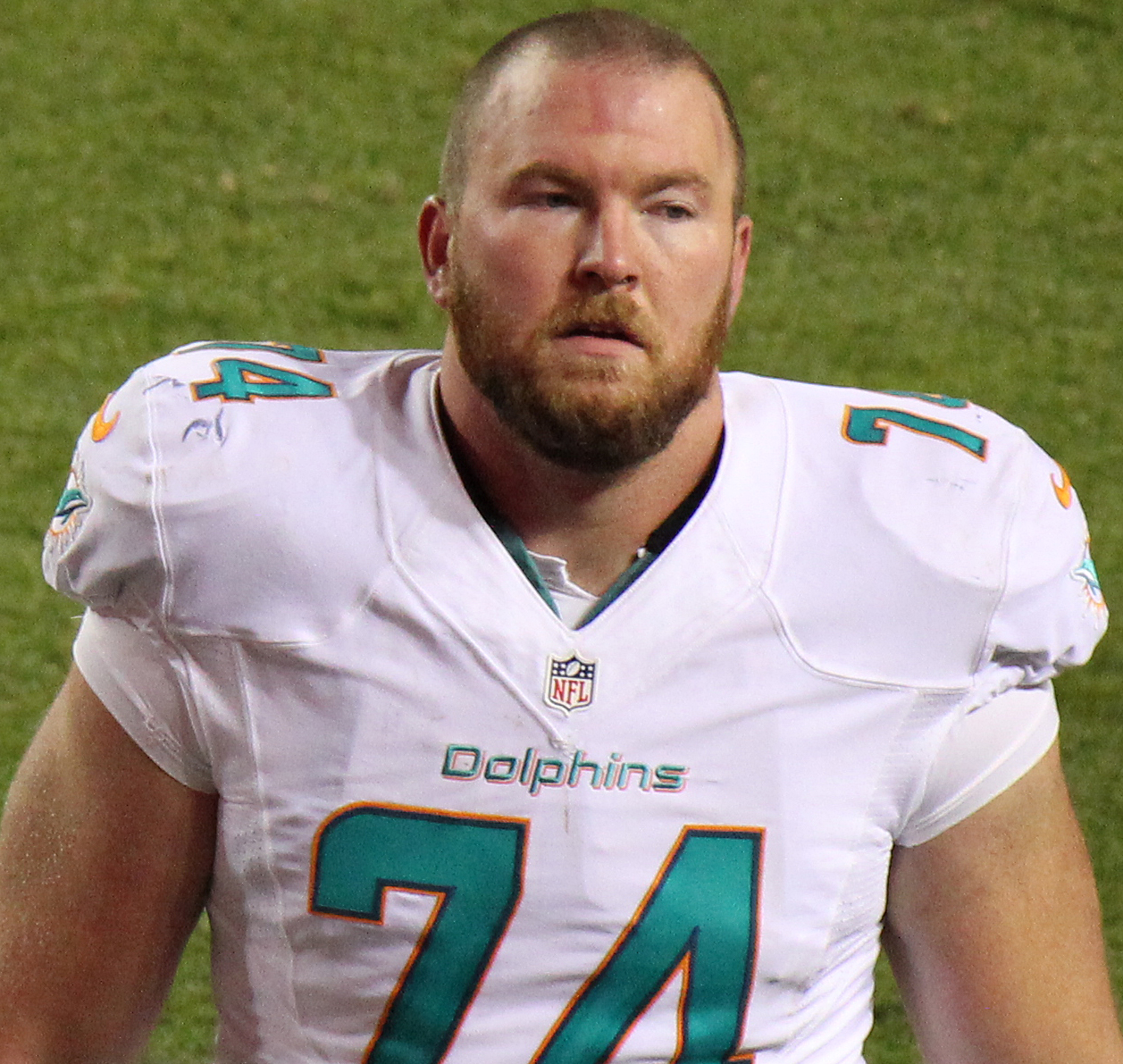
- Fox with the Miami Dolphins in 2014

No. 70, 74
- Position: Offensive tackle

Personal information
- Born: May 2, 1988 (age 38); Fort Worth, Texas, U.S.
- Listed height: 6 ft 6 in (1.98 m)
- Listed weight: 310 lb (141 kg)

Career information
- High school: North Crowley (Fort Worth)
- College: Miami (FL)
- NFL draft: 2010: 4th round, 128th overall pick

Career history
- Detroit Lions (2010–2013); Miami Dolphins (2014–2015)

Awards and highlights
- First-team All-ACC (2009)

Career NFL statistics
- Games played: 37
- Games started: 16
- Stats at Pro Football Reference

Jason Curtis Fox (born May 2, 1988) is an American former professional football player who was an offensive tackle for the Detroit Lions and Miami Dolphins of the National Football League (NFL). He played college football for the Miami Hurricanes, and was selected by the Lions in the fourth round of the 2010 NFL draft.

== Early life ==
Fox was born and raised in Fort Worth, Texas. Miami former offensive line coach Mario Cristobal recruited him. At North Crowley High School, he played tight end during his junior year, moving to the offensive line as a senior. He was rated by Scout.com and Rivals.com as a four-star recruit.

== College career ==
Fox decided between the University of Miami and many Big 12 schools before deciding that he wanted to go play for the 'U', where he started at right tackle as a true freshman in the season opener against Florida State and became the starting left tackle midway through the season and held on to it for the remainder of his time at Miami.

Fox started 47 games for the Hurricanes, two away from breaking the school start mark by an offensive lineman set by Richard Mercier and Mike Sullivan (48) and three away from tying the mark regardless of position by William Joseph.

Before the start of Fox' senior year, he was selected to his first Preseason All-ACC Team.

While at the University of Miami, Fox was a member of the Pi Kappa Alpha fraternity.

== Professional career ==
=== Detroit Lions ===
Fox was seen as a developmental tackle to be groomed by long-time Detroit Lions starting left tackle Jeff Backus but saw little action due to injuries. In 2011, Fox was inactive through the first eight games, then was placed on injured reserve, ending his season. He played in one game in the 2012 season. In 2013, he won the starting position of right tackle taking over for the departed Gosder Cherilus. Fox started in only three games, though he played in eight.

=== Miami Dolphins ===
On April 2, 2014, Fox signed a one-year contract with the Miami Dolphins.

=== Post-playing career ===
After retiring from the NFL, Fox became the founder and CEO of the social listening app, 'EarBuds'.
