= Vince Oghobaase =

American football player and coach (born 1987)

Green Bay Packers
- Title: Defensive line coach

Personal information
- Born: January 24, 1987 (age 39); Houston, Texas, U.S.
- Listed height: 6 ft 5 in (1.96 m)
- Listed weight: 303 lb (137 kg)

Career information
- Position: Defensive tackle
- High school: Houston (TX) Alief Hastings
- College: Duke
- NFL draft: 2010: undrafted

Career history

Playing
- Miami Dolphins (2010)*; Hartford Colonials (2010); Washington Redskins (2010)*
- * Offseason or practice squad member only

Coaching
- Duke (2011–2012) Graduate assistant; Ohio State (2013–2015) Graduate assistant; San Francisco 49ers (2016–2017) Assistant defensive line coach; UCLA (2018–2019) Defensive line coach; Boston College (2020–2023) Defensive line coach; Green Bay Packers (2024–2025) Assistant defensive line coach; Green Bay Packers (2026–present) Defensive line coach

Awards and highlights
- Third-team All-American (2009)

Vince Oghobaase (born January 24, 1987) is an American former football defensive tackle who is the defensive line coach for the Green Bay Packers of the National Football League (NFL). He was signed by the Hartford Colonials as an undrafted free agent in 2010. He played college football at Duke.

== Career ==
=== Playing career ===
Pre-draft measurables
Height	Weight	Arm length	Hand span	40-yard dash	10-yard split	20-yard split	20-yard shuttle	Three-cone drill	Vertical jump	Broad jump	Bench press
6 ft 5 1/4 in (1.96 m)	303 lb (137 kg)	35 3/8 in (0.90 m)	10 in (0.25 m)	5.29 s	1.78 s	2.99 s	4.75 s	7.84 s	26.0 in (0.66 m)	7 ft 6 in (2.29 m)	27 reps
All values from NFL Combine/Pro Day

=== Coaching career ===
On March 19, 2026, Oghobaase was promoted to defensive line coach.
