= Deunta Williams =

American football player (born 1987)

No. 27
- Position: Safety

Personal information
- Born: November 21, 1987 (age 38); Jacksonville, North Carolina, U.S.
- Listed height: 6 ft 2 in (1.88 m)
- Listed weight: 215 lb (98 kg)

Career information
- High school: White Oak (NC)
- College: North Carolina
- NFL draft: 2011: undrafted

Awards and highlights
- First-team All-ACC (2009); ACC Defensive Rookie of the Year (2007); Freshman All-American (2007)

Deunta Williams (born November 21, 1987) is an American former football safety. He played football for the North Carolina Tar Heels. Williams was considered one of the top prospects in his class.

== Early life ==
A native of Jacksonville, North Carolina, Williams attended White Oak High School, where he starred at wide receiver and defensive back. Williams also saw time as a running back and quarterback in his high school career. As a senior, he caught 29 passes for 299 yards on offense and averaged eight tackles per game and intercepted seven passes on defense, while as a junior, he had 400 yards receiving, 250 yards rushing and 200 yards passing. He received All-American honors by SuperPrep and was named the defensive MVP for the North Carolina team in the Shrine Bowl.

Considered a four-star recruit by Rivals.com, Williams was listed as the No. 25 athlete in the nation in 2006.

== College career ==
After redshirting his initial season at North Carolina, Williams switched from wide receiver to safety in the fall of 2007, prior to the start of the season. He started all 12 games and ranked fifth on the team with 59 tackles. Williams was an FWAA and Rivals.com Freshman All-American in 2007.

As a sophomore, Williams started all 13 games and ranked fifth on the team with 65 tackles, including 55 solo stops. He also had three interceptions, three pass breakups and one forced fumble.

Williams was suspended for the first four games of the 2010 season for receiving improper benefits. During the Franklin Mortgage American Music City Bowl, Williams suffered a career ending injury to his leg.

== Professional career ==
Williams went undrafted in the 2011 NFL draft.
