= Matt Tennant =

American football player (born 1987)

No. 65, 68
- Position: Center

Personal information
- Born: March 19, 1987 (age 39); Cincinnati, Ohio, U.S.
- Listed height: 6 ft 4 in (1.93 m)
- Listed weight: 300 lb (136 kg)

Career information
- High school: Archbishop Moeller (Cincinnati)
- College: Boston College
- NFL draft: 2010: 5th round, 158th overall pick

Career history
- New Orleans Saints (2010–2011); New England Patriots (2012); Philadelphia Eagles (2012)

Awards and highlights
- Second-team All-American (2009); Second-team All-ACC (2009)

Career NFL statistics
- Games played: 36
- Stats at Pro Football Reference

Matthew H. Tennant (born March 19, 1987) is an American former professional football player who was a center in the National Football League (NFL). He played college football for the Boston College Eagles and was considered one of the best centers available for the 2010 NFL draft. He was drafted by the New Orleans Saints in the fifth round and played with the Saints for two years.

== Early life ==
Tennant attended Moeller High School in Cincinnati, Ohio, where he was a three-year starter on the offensive line and senior team captain. He gained Associated Press All-State second-team honors and was named a 2004 All-American by SuperPrep.

Considered a three-star recruit by Rivals.com, Tennant was listed as the No. 55 offensive guard prospect in the nation in 2005. He chose Boston College over offers from Indiana, Kentucky, Penn State, and Purdue.

== College career ==
After redshirting his initial year at Boston College, Tennant saw action in five games in the 2006 season. In his sophomore season, Tennant succeeded Kevin Sheridan as the Eagles' center. He started all 14 games for the Eagles in 2007 and helped the team to finish with 5,924 yards of total offense, while quarterback Matt Ryan passed for 4,507 yards.

As a junior, Tennant remained BC's starting center and played in all 14 games. The Eagles' line allowed only 21 quarterback sacks with a pair of first-year starting quarterbacks behind them. Tennant's performance earned him an All-ACC honorable mention.

Prior to his senior season, Tennant was voted a team captain. He started all games for the Eagles and anchored an offensive line that ranked 35th in the country in sacks allowed (1.42). He subsequently earned Second-team All-American honors by the Walter Camp Foundation.

== Professional career ==
=== Pre-draft ===
Pre-draft measurables
Height	Weight	Arm length	Hand span	40-yard dash	10-yard split	20-yard split	20-yard shuttle	Three-cone drill	Vertical jump	Broad jump	Bench press
6 ft 4 5/8 in (1.95 m)	300 lb (136 kg)	32 1/4 in (0.82 m)	9 1/2 in (0.24 m)	5.16 s	1.81 s	3.00 s	4.62 s	7.60 s	25.0 in (0.64 m)	8 ft 2 in (2.49 m)	27 reps
All values from NFL Combine

Projected as a second-round selection by Sports Illustrated, Tennant was ranked as the No. 2 available in the 2010 NFL draft, behind only Maurkice Pouncey.

=== New Orleans Saints ===
Tennant was selected by the Saints in the fifth round of the 2010 NFL draft with the 158th overall pick. He signed a four-year contract with the Saints on July 22, 2010. He was cut in 2012.

=== New England Patriots ===
Tennant was claimed off waivers by the New England Patriots on September 1, 2012, but was cut on September 4 when the Patriots needed to make room on the roster for running back Lex Hilliard. Tennant was again signed by New England as an emergency depth option because of the injuries to Guard Logan Mankins and Tackle Nick McDonald.

Tennant was released by the Patriots on October 20, 2012.

=== Philadelphia Eagles ===
Tennant was signed by the Philadelphia Eagles on October 23, 2012, after the Eagles released center Steve Vallos, who replaced injured starting center Jason Kelce. He was released on August 30, 2013.
