= Boo Robinson =

American gridiron football player (born 1987)

No. 66
- Position: Defensive tackle

Personal information
- Born: August 5, 1987 (age 39); Monroe, Louisiana
- Listed height: 6 ft 1 in (1.85 m)
- Listed weight: 295 lb (134 kg)

Career information
- College: Wake Forest
- NFL draft: 2010: undrafted

Career history
- Philadelphia Eagles (2010)*; Cleveland Browns (2010)*; Buffalo Bills (2010–2011); Saskatchewan Roughriders (2012)*
- * Offseason or practice squad member only
- Stats at CFL.ca (archive)

Shaunterous "Boo" Robinson (born August 5, 1987) is a former professional American football defensive tackle. He was signed by the Philadelphia Eagles as an undrafted free agent in 2010. He played college football at Wake Forest.

Robinson was also a member of the Cleveland Browns, Buffalo Bills and Saskatchewan Roughriders.

== Early life ==
Robinson attended Richwood High School in Monroe, Louisiana, where he was an all-state defensive lineman. He had 128 tackles as a senior with 10 sacks, four forced fumbles, three fumble recoveries, 26 tackles for loss and 39 quarterback hurries, while helping to lead Richwood to the state quarterfinals in 2004.

Considered only a one-star recruit by Scout.com, Robinson was not ranked among the best defensive tackle prospects in the nation. He chose Wake Forest over offers from Arkansas State, Louisiana Tech, Tulane, UL-Monroe and UL-Lafayette.

== College career ==
After redshirting his initial year at Wake Forest, Robinson played in all 14 games and drew one starting assignment (against Maryland) in 2006. He tied for second among defensive linemen with 35 tackles, while also recording 2.5 quarterback sacks. Against Florida State he had a pass break-up and an interception.

As a sophomore, Robinson started in all 13 games and concluded the season with 23 tackles including 15 solos. He tied for third on the team with six tackles for loss, and also registered 3.0 sacks. In his junior year, Robinson started 12 of 13 games, as he had to come off the bench against Ole Miss after missing considerable practice time while recuperating from a sprained ankle he suffered in the season opener at Baylor. He finished 11th in the ACC in sacks (6.0), and received honorable mention All-ACC accolades.

In 2009, Robinson was listed at No. 12 on Rivals.com′s preseason defensive tackle power ranking. He was also named to the 2009 Outland Trophy watch list. Robinson said he wanted to be around 310 pounds when the Deacons opened the season against Baylor on September 5.

== Professional career ==
=== Pre-draft ===
Robinson was regarded as one of the best defensive tackles in the 2010 NFL draft.

=== Philadelphia Eagles ===
Robinson was signed to a three-year contract by the Philadelphia Eagles as an undrafted free agent following the 2010 NFL draft on May 18, 2010. He was waived on September 3.

=== Cleveland Browns ===
Robinson was signed to the Cleveland Browns' practice squad on September 30, 2010. He was released on October 7.

=== Buffalo Bills ===
Robinson was signed to the Buffalo Bills' practice squad on December 28, 2010.

=== Saskatchewan Roughriders ===
Robinson was signed by the Saskatchewan Roughriders on January 19, 2012. He was released by the Riders on June 17, 2012.
