= 2009 Virginia Tech Hokies football team =

American college football season

2009 Virginia Tech Hokies football

Chick-fil-A Bowl champion

Chick-fil-A Bowl, W 37–14 vs. Tennessee
- Conference: Atlantic Coast Conference
- Coastal Division

Ranking
- Coaches: No. 10
- AP: No. 10
- Record: 10–3 (6–2 ACC)
- Head coach: Frank Beamer (23rd season)
- Offensive coordinator: Bryan Stinespring (8th season)
- Offensive scheme: Pro-style
- Defensive coordinator: Bud Foster (15th season)
- Base defense: 4–4
- Home stadium: Lane Stadium

Uniform

2009 Atlantic Coast Conference football standings
	Conf.			Overall
Team	W		L	W		L
Atlantic Division
No. 24 Clemson x	6	–	2	9	–	5
Boston College	5	–	3	8	–	5
Florida State	4	–	4	7	–	6
Wake Forest	3	–	5	5	–	7
NC State	2	–	6	5	–	7
Maryland	1	–	7	2	–	10
Coastal Division
No. 13 Georgia Tech * x$	7	–	1	11	–	3
No. 10 Virginia Tech	6	–	2	10	–	3
No. 19 Miami (FL)	5	–	3	9	–	4
North Carolina *	0	–	4	0	–	5
Duke	3	–	5	5	–	7
Virginia	2	–	6	3	–	9
Championship: Georgia Tech 39, Clemson 34
$ – BCS representative as conference champion; North Carolina vacated 8 wins, including 4 ACC wins.; Rankings from AP Poll

The 2009 Virginia Tech Hokies football team represented Virginia Polytechnic Institute and State University during the 2009 NCAA Division I FBS football season. The team's head coach was Frank Beamer. The Hokies finished the season 10–3 (6–2 ACC) and won the Chick-fil-A Bowl, 37–14, over Tennessee.

== Schedule ==
Date	Time	Opponent	Rank	Site	TV	Result	Attendance	Source
September 5	8:00 p.m.	vs. No. 5 Alabama*	No. 7	Georgia Dome; Atlanta, GA (Chick-fil-A Kickoff Game) (College GameDay)	ABC	L 24–34	74,954	
September 12	1:30 p.m.	Marshall*	No. 14	Lane Stadium; Blacksburg, VA	ESPN360	W 52–10	66,233	
September 19	3:30 p.m.	No. 19 Nebraska*	No. 13	Lane Stadium; Blacksburg, VA	ABC	W 16–15	66,233	
September 26	3:30 p.m.	No. 9 Miami (FL)	No. 11	Lane Stadium; Blacksburg, VA (rivalry)	ABC/ESPN	W 31–7	66,233	
October 3	12:00 p.m.	at Duke	No. 6	Wallace Wade Stadium; Durham, NC	ESPN360	W 34–26	26,211	
October 10	12:00 p.m.	Boston College^{†}	No. 5	Lane Stadium; Blacksburg, VA (rivalry)	Raycom	W 48–14	66,233	
October 17	6:00 p.m.	at No. 19 Georgia Tech	No. 4	Bobby Dodd Stadium; Atlanta, GA (Battle of the Techs)	ESPN2	L 23–28	54,405	
October 29	7:30 p.m.	North Carolina	No. 14	Lane Stadium; Blacksburg, VA	ESPN	L 17–20*	66,233	
November 5	7:30 p.m.	at East Carolina*	No. 22	Dowdy–Ficklen Stadium; Greenville, NC	ESPN	W 16–3	43,569	
November 14	1:00 p.m.	at Maryland	No. 20	Byrd Stadium; College Park, MD	ESPN360	W 36–9	51,514	
November 21	3:30 p.m.	NC State	No. 16	Lane Stadium; Blacksburg, VA	ESPNU	W 38–10	66,233	
November 28	3:30 p.m.	at Virginia	No. 14	Scott Stadium; Charlottesville, VA (Battle for the Commonwealth Cup)	ABC/ESPN	W 42–13	58,555	
December 31	7:30 p.m.	vs. Tennessee*	No. 12	Georgia Dome; Atlanta, GA (Chick-fil-A Bowl)	ESPN	W 37–14	73,777	
*Non-conference game; ^{†}Homecoming; Rankings from AP Poll released prior to the game; All times are in Eastern time

*Vacated by North Carolina

Source: ACC

== Coaching staff ==
Position	Name	First year at VT	First year in current position
Head coach	Frank Beamer	1987	1987
Associate head coach and running backs coach	Billy Hite	1978	2001
Offensive coordinator and tight ends	Bryan Stinespring	1990	2006 (offensive coordinator since 2002)
Defensive coordinator and inside linebackers	Bud Foster	1987	1995
Offensive Line	Curt Newsome	2006	2006
Wide Receivers	Kevin Sherman	2006	2006
Strong Safety, Outside Linebackers, and Recruiting Coordinator	Jim Cavanaugh	1996	2002
Quarterbacks	Mike O'Cain	2006	2006
Defensive backs	Torrian Gray	2006	2006
Defensive Line	Charley Wiles	1996	1996
Source: http://www.hokiesports.com/football/players/

== Roster ==
Wide receiver: Ben Barber - Freshman; Nubian Peak - Freshman; 11 Dyrell Roberts - Sophomore; 19 Danny Coale - (redshirt) Sophomore; 80 Brandon Dillard - (redshirt) Senior; 83 Patrick Terry - (redshirt) Sophomore; Split End: Brandon Keith - Freshman; 7 Marcus Davis - (redshirt) Freshman; 29 Xavier Boyce - (redshirt) Freshman; 35 Austin Fuller - (redshirt) Freshman; 81 Jarrett Boykin - Sophomore; 90 D.J. Coles - Freshman; Center: Bo Gentry - (redshirt) Freshman; Andrew Miller - Freshman; 60 Beau Warren - (redshirt) Junior; 67 Michael Via - (redshirt) Freshman; Offensive Guard: Tyler Barfield - Freshman; Jim Brown - Freshman; David Wang - Freshman; 64 Richard Graham - (redshirt) Senior; 65 Matt Baldwin - (redshirt) Sophomore; 68 Jaymes Brooks - (redshirt) Sophomore; 70 Sergio Render - Senior; Offensive Tackle: Darian Fisher - Freshman; 54 Nick Becton - (redshirt) Freshman; 62 Blake DeChristopher - (redshirt) Sophomore; 71 Vinston Painter - (redshirt) Freshman; 72 Andrew Lanier - (redshirt) Sophomore; 75 Greg Nosal - (redshirt) Sophomore; 77 Ed Wang - (redshirt) Senior; Tight End: George George - (redshirt) Freshman; 8 Greg Boone - (redshirt) Senior; 13 Randall Dunn - (redshirt) Freshman; 18 Sam Wheeler - (redshirt) Senior; 85 Rob Stanton - (redshirt) Junior; 86 Eric Martin - Freshman; 87 Prince Parker - (redshirt) Junior; 88 Andre Smith - (redshirt) Junior; 89 Jay Cockrill - Freshman	Quarterback: Wll Cole - Freshman; 3 Logan Thomas - Freshman; 5 Tyrod Taylor - Junior; 12 Joseph Clayton - (redshirt) Freshman; 16 Jeff Beyer - (redshirt) Senior; Tailback: Adam Dyer - Freshman; Tony Gregory - Freshman; 4 David Wilson - Freshman; 20 Kenny Lewis, Jr. - Senior; 25 Josh Oglesby - (redshirt) Sophomore; 32 Darren Evans - (redshirt) Sophomore; 34 Ryan Williams - (redshirt) Freshman; 46 Zach Evans - (redshirt) Freshman; Fullback: Josh Call - (redshirt) Freshman; 27 Joey Phillips - (redshirt) Freshman; 31 Kenny Younger - - (redshirt) Junior; 42 Kenny Jefferson - (redshirt) Senior; Defensive tackle: 45 Joe Jones - (redshirt) Freshman; 53 Dwight Tucker - (redshirt) Freshman; 56 Demetrius Taylor - (redshirt) Senior; 59 Courtney Prince - (redshirt) Freshman; 91 John Graves - (redshirt) Junior; 93 Kwamaine Battle - (redshirt) Sophomore; 95 Cordarrow Thompson - (redshirt) Senior; 98 Antoine Hopkins - (redshirt) Freshman; Defensive End: J.R. Collins - Freshman; Josh Eadie - (redshirt) Junior; James Gayle - Freshman; Christian Reed - Freshman; Jeff Wardach - (redshirt) Sophomore; Tyrel Wilson - Freshman; 6 Jason Worilds - (redshirt) Junior; 33 Chris Drager - (redshirt) Sophomore; 47 Nekos Brown - Senior; 55 Isaiah Hamlette - (redshirt) Freshman; 82 Steven Friday - (redshirt) Junior	Cornerback: James Hopper - Freshman; Germond Oatneal - Sophomore; Jerrodd Williams - Freshman; 9 Cris Hill - (redshirt) Sophomore; 15 Eddie Whitley - Sophomore; 20 Jayron Hosley - Freshman; 21 Rashad Carmichael - (redshirt) Junior; 22 Stephan Virgil - Senior; 37 Jacob Sykes - (redshirt) Sophomore; Linebacker: Wiley Brown - Freshman; Telvion Clark - Freshman; Tariq Edwards - Freshman; Tim Richardson - (redshirt) Junior; Jack Tyler - Freshman; Jerome Williams - (redshirt) Freshman; 26 Cody Grimm - (redshirt) Senior; 28 Alonzo Tweedy - (redshirt) Freshman; 36 Jake Johnson - Sophomore; 38 Quilie Odom - sophomore; 39 Lyndell Gibson - (redshirt) Freshman; 41 Cam Martin - (redshirt) Senior; 43 Jeron Gouveia-Winslow - (redshirt) Freshman; 44 Zach Luckett - Junior; 51 Bruce Taylor - (redshirt) Freshman; 52 Barquell Rivers - (redshirt) Sophomore; 94 Mark Muncey - (redshirt) Senior; Free Safety: Mark Carter - Freshman; Antone Exum - Freshman; Nick Sheehan - Freshman; 14 Lorenzo Williams - Sophomore; 17 Kam Chancellor - Senior; Rover: 2 Davon Morgan - Junior; 23 Matt Reidy - (redshirt) Senior; 24 Dorian Porch - (redshirt) Senior; Snapper: Ethan Dickerson - Freshman; Joe Yates - Freshman; 50 Collin Carroll - (redshirt) Sophomore; 63 Matt Tuttle - (redshirt) Senior; Punter: Grant Bowden - Freshman; 30 Brian Saunders - (redshirt) Junior; 97 Brent Bowden - (redshirt) Senior; Place Kicker: Chris Hazley - Junior; Cody Journell - Freshman; Zack Pickard - Freshman; 48 Justin Myer - Sophomore; 49 Matt Waldron - (redshirt) Senior

== Rankings ==
Ranking movements Legend: ██ Increase in ranking ██ Decrease in ranking
	Week															
Poll	Pre	1	2	3	4	5	6	7	8	9	10	11	12	13	14	Final
AP	7	14	13	11	6	5	4	15	14	22	20	16	14	11	12	10
Coaches	7	15	14	12	6	5	4	15	14	24	21	16	14	11	12	10
Harris	Not released				6	6	4	15	14	23	21	16	14	12	11	Not released
BCS	Not released							14	13	23	21	15	14	12	11	Not released

== Season summary ==
=== Nebraska ===
#19 Nebraska Cornhuskers (2–0) at #13 Virginia Tech Hokies (1–1)

Quarter	1	2	3	4	Total
Nebraska	3	9	0	3	15
Virginia Tech	7	3	0	6	16

at Lane Stadium, Blacksburg, Virginia

- Date: September 19, 2009
- Game time: 3:30 p.m. EST
- Game weather: Cloudy, 74 °F (23 °C)
- Game attendance: 66,233
- Referee: Karl Richins
- TV announcers (ABC/ESPN2): Sean McDonough, Matt Millen, and Holly Rowe
- Box Score

Game information

First quarter

- VT – Ryan Williams 1-yard run (Matt Waldron kick), 11:15. Virginia Tech 7–0. Drive: 7 plays, 24 yards, 3:45.
- NU – Alex Henery 40-yard field goal, 0:56. Virginia Tech 7–3. Drive: 4 plays, -1 yard, 1:29.

Second quarter

- NU – Alex Henery 27-yard field goal, 12:49. Virginia Tech 7–6. Drive: 6 plays, 48 yards, 1:49.
- NU – Alex Henery 19-yard field goal, 5:23. Nebraska 9–7. Drive: 10 plays, 77 yards, 4:32.
- VT – Matt Waldron 39-yard field goal, 2:30. Virginia Tech 10–9. Drive: 7 plays, 58 yards, 2:53.
- NU – Alex Henery 38-yard field goal, 0:18. Nebraska 12–10. Drive: 5 plays, 50 yards, 2:06.

Fourth quarter

- NU – Alex Henery 38-yard field goal, 4:33. Nebraska 15–10. Drive: 10 plays, 54 yards, 5:01.
- VT – Dyrell Roberts 11-yard pass from Tyrod Taylor (pass failed), 0:21. Virginia Tech 16–15. Drive: 5 plays, 88 yards, 1:23.

Top passers

- NU – Zac Lee – 11/30, 136 yards, 2 INT
- VT – Tyrod Taylor – 12/27, 192 yards, TD

Top rushers

- NU – Roy Helu Jr. – 28 rushes, 169 yards
- VT – Ryan Williams – 21 rushes, 107 yards, TD

Top receivers

- NU – Curenski Gilleylen – 1 reception, 35 yards
- VT – Danny Coale – 2 receptions, 89 yards

== Flyovers ==
Virginia Tech home games have featured flyovers by military aircraft.

Date	Opponent	aircraft	origin	comments
September 12	Marshall University	Rockwell B-1 Lancer	Dyess Air Force Base	Carried the largest payload of weapons in the Air Force inventory
September 26	University of Miami	Bell AH-1 SuperCobra helicopters	Marine Light Attack Helicopter Squadron 775	led by 1987 Virginia Tech alumni
November 21	North Carolina State	T-1A Jayhawk	Columbus Air Force Base	included 3 alumni in the air crews

== Statistics ==
=== Team ===
	Team	Opp
Scoring	414	203
Points per Game	31.8	15.6
First downs	232	194
Rushing	124	91
Passing	96	90
Penalty	12	13
Total Offense	5097	3841
Avg per Play	6.2	4.6
Avg per Game	392.1	295.5
Fumbles-Lost	19-10	23-13
Penalties-Yards	75-634	80-611
Avg per Game	48.8	47.0

	Team	Opp
Punts-Yards	57-2,495	82-3,374
Avg per Punt	43.8	41.1
Time of Possession/Game	30:21	29:38
3rd Down Conversions	74/172	69/197
4th Down Conversions	4/12	8/17
Touchdowns Scored	51	20
Field Goal-Attempts	20-23	21-23
PAT-Attempts	48-48	18-18
Attendance	397,398	234,254
Games/Avg per Game	6-66,233	5-46,851

=== Offense ===
==== Rushing ====
Name	GP-GS	Att	Yards	Avg	TD	Long	Avg/G
Ryan Williams	13-13	293	1655	5.6	21	66	127.3
Tyrod Taylor	13-13	106	370	3.5	5	46	28.5
Josh Oglesby	13-0	78	335	4.3	2	34	25.8
David Wilson	13-0	59	334	5.7	4	51	25.7
Dyrell Roberts	13-5	10	48	4.8	0	21	3.4
Greg Boone	12-12	2	9	4.5	0	5	0.8
Danny Coale	13-12	2	8	4.0	0	5	0.6
Marcus Davis	12-0	1	7	7	0	7	0.6
Zac Evans	3-0	1	6	6	0	6	2.0
Ju-Ju Clayton	5-0	3	-13	-4.3	0	0	-4.4
Total	13	573	2706	4.7	32	66	208.2
Opponents	13	468	1669	3.6	10	61	128.4

==== Passing ====
Name	GP-GS	Com	Att	Yds	TD	INT	Pct	Eff	Long	Avg/G
Tyrod Taylor	13-13	136	243	2311	13	5	56.0	149.4	81	177.8
Ju-Ju Clayton	5-0	1	5	80	1	0	20.0	220.4	80	16.0
Greg Boone	12-12	0	1	0	0	0	0.0	0.0	0	0.0
Total	13	137	249	2391	14	5	55.0	150.2	81	183.9
Opponents	13	174	367	2172	9	11	47.4	99.2	74	167.1

==== Receiving ====
Name	GP-GS	Rec	Yds	Avg	TD	Long	Avg/G
Jarrett Boykin	13-10	40	835	20.9	5	64	64.2
Danny Coale	13-12	30	614	20.5	2	81	47.2
Dyrell Roberts	13-5	22	390	17.7	3	41	30.0
Ryan Williams	13-13	16	180	11.3	1	43	13.8
Xavier Boyce	13-3	8	88	11.0	1	21	6.8
Greg Boone	12-12	7	75	10.7	0	20	6.3
Marcus Davis	12-0	5	125	25.0	1	80	10.4
Andre Smith	13-6	3	27	9.0	1	17	2.1
Josh Oglesby	13-0	3	20	6.7	0	13	1.5
Sam Wheeler	13-2	2	30	15.0	0	16	2.3
Kenny Jefferson	12-2	1	7	7.0	0	7	0.6
Total	13	137	2391	17.5	14	81	183.9
Opponents	13	174	2172	12.5	9	74	167.1
