= 2009 Chick-fil-A Bowl =

American college football game

- 42nd Peach Bowl
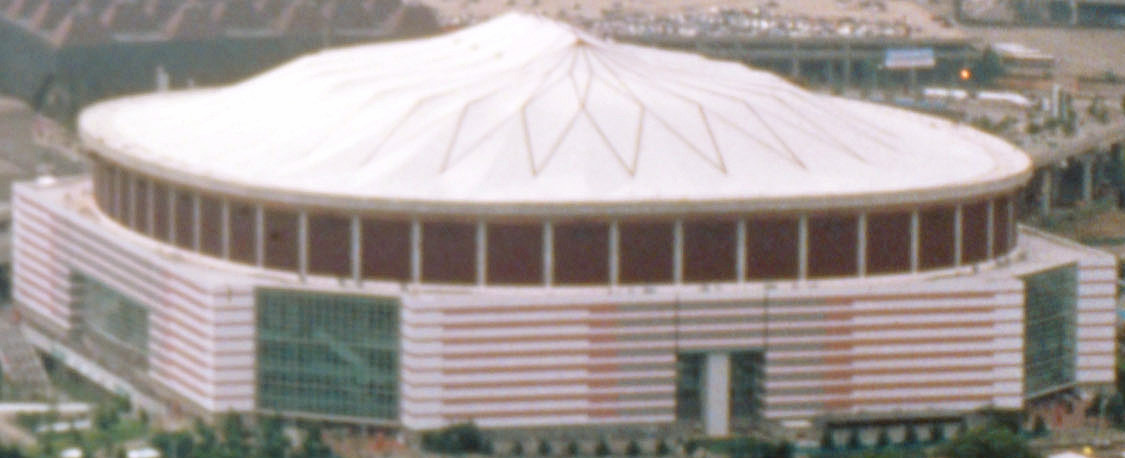
- The Georgia Dome in Atlanta, Georgia, hosted the Chick-fil-A Bowl.
Virginia Tech Hokies	Tennessee Volunteers
(9–3)	(7–5)
ACC	SEC
37	14
Head coach: Frank Beamer	Head coach: Lane Kiffin
AP / Coaches / BCS; 12 / 12 / 11
	1	2	3	4	Total
Virginia Tech	7	10	7	13	37
Tennessee	0	14	0	0	14
- Date: December 31, 2009
- Season: 2009
- Stadium: Georgia Dome
- Location: Atlanta, Georgia
- MVP: RB Ryan Williams (Virginia Tech)
- Favorite: Virginia Tech by 5.5
- National anthem: Trumpeter Dan Oxley
- Referee: Ed Ardito (Conference USA)
- Attendance: 73,777
- Payout: US$3.01 million per team

United States TV coverage
- Network: ESPN
- Announcers: Sean McDonough; Matt Millen; Holly Rowe
- Nielsen ratings: 4.2

The 2009 Chick-fil-A Bowl was a college football bowl game between the Virginia Tech Hokies and the Tennessee Volunteers played on December 31, 2009, in the Georgia Dome in Atlanta, Georgia. With sponsorship from Chick-fil-A, it was the 42nd edition of the game known throughout most of its history as the Peach Bowl. Virginia Tech defeated Tennessee 37–14. The game was part of the 2009 NCAA Division I FBS football season and was the concluding game of the season for both teams. The game was televised in the United States on ESPN and the broadcast was seen by an estimated 4.87 million viewers.

Each participating team was selected by the bowl game's selection committee, which had paid contracts with the participating football conferences. The Chick-fil-A Bowl had the second pick of bowl-eligible teams from the Atlantic Coast Conference and the fifth pick from eligible teams in the Southeastern Conference. In picking Virginia Tech and Tennessee, the selection committee bypassed teams with better or similar records in order to create a matchup appealing to television audiences. Pregame media coverage focused on the close geographic rivalry between the two teams and the success of Tennessee head coach Lane Kiffin in reversing his team's poor fortune from the previous season.

The game kicked off at 7:37 p.m. EST and Virginia Tech jumped to an early lead with a first-quarter touchdown. Tennessee replied in the second quarter with two touchdowns of their own, but Virginia Tech kept the lead by scoring 10 points in the quarter. At halftime, Tech led 17–14. In the second half, Virginia Tech pulled away from Tennessee, scoring 20 unanswered points to win the game 37–14.

In recognition of his performance during the game, Virginia Tech running back Ryan Williams was named the game's most valuable player. By the end of the game, he had set a school record for most rushing yards in a season and conference records for most rushing touchdowns and most total touchdowns. Following the game, Tennessee head coach Lane Kiffin resigned to become head coach of the University of Southern California Trojans football team. Several players from each team participated in postseason all-star games and a handful were selected to play in the National Football League through the 2010 NFL draft.

== Team selection ==
Beginning with the 2006 game, the Chick-fil-A Bowl purchased the right to select the highest-ranked Atlantic Coast Conference team after representatives from the Bowl Championship Series made their selection. The contract was renewed in 2009, extending that right through 2013. According to the official selection rules used in the 2009–10 season, the team chosen to represent the ACC in the Chick-fil-A Bowl had to be within one conference victory of the remaining highest-ranked conference team or ranked more than five spaces ahead of the ACC team with the best conference record available in the final BCS standings. Following the conclusion of the 2009 college football regular season, the Chick-fil-A Bowl selection committee bypassed the ACC Championship Game loser, Clemson, in order to pick Virginia Tech, which had the same conference record. The committee believed a game featuring Virginia Tech would draw more television viewers and in-person attendance than Clemson, even though the Chick-fil-A Bowl was the third time that season Virginia Tech played a game in Atlanta.

In choosing the SEC opponent, the Chick-fil-A Bowl selection committee had the right to select the first SEC school after the Bowl Championship Series, Cotton Bowl Classic, Capital One Bowl, and Outback Bowl made their selections. Just as in the ACC, the selection committee could not select an SEC team with two more losses than the highest available team. After the 2009 regular season ended, SEC champion Alabama was selected for the national championship game, and SEC runner-up Florida was picked by the Sugar Bowl to fill the SEC's BCS tie-in. The Cotton Bowl selected Ole Miss, the Capital One Bowl picked LSU, and the Outback Bowl took Auburn. For its pick, the Chick-fil-A Bowl bypassed local team Georgia (No. 2 in the SEC's eastern division) for Tennessee (No. 3 in the division) in order to set up a game against two geographic rivals and because Tennessee had defeated Georgia in a head-to-head matchup.

The bowl earned the right to select these teams via its multimillion-dollar payout system, which guarantees a certain amount of money to the participating conferences. Before 2006, the Chick-fil-A Bowl (then known as the Peach Bowl) matched the No. 5 team in the SEC versus the No. 3 team in the ACC. After the bowl increased its payout to $2.8 million per squad, it then was given the second pick from the ACC, with the Gator Bowl dropping to third. After 2006, the Chick-fil-A Bowl has steadily increased its payouts in order to keep pace with the trend across college football. In the 2009 game, the ACC and SEC split a payout of $6.02 million, with the ACC receiving more because it offered an earlier selection.

=== Virginia Tech ===
The Hokies went 10–4 in 2008, concluding the season with a 20–7 win in the 2009 Orange Bowl. Before the 2009 season started, Virginia Tech accepted an invitation to play Alabama in the Chick-fil-A Kickoff Game, a game organized by the Chick-fil-A Bowl to pit two high-profile teams against each other to create a bowl game-like atmosphere in the Georgia Dome at the start of the season. Virginia Tech was ranked No. 7 in the preseason polls, while Alabama was No. 5; the game was forecast as a competition between two possible national championship contenders. Alabama defeated Virginia Tech 34-24 and ultimately went on to win the national championship.

Tech recovered from the loss by winning its next five games, including a last-second victory over 19th-ranked Nebraska and a 31–7 blowout victory over No. 9 Miami. The victories brought Tech to a 5–1 record and a No. 4 national ranking. On October 17, Virginia Tech traveled to Atlanta for the second time that season, this time to play 19th-ranked Georgia Tech. For the first time since 1962, Georgia Tech defeated a top-five team, beating Virginia Tech 28–23. Georgia Tech's win gave it a tiebreaker against Virginia Tech in the Atlantic Coast Conference standings, but Virginia Tech made the tiebreaker moot by losing its next game, an ACC contest against North Carolina. Georgia Tech lost only one ACC game all season, a record that won it the ACC's Coastal Division and the accompanying spot in the ACC Championship Game ahead of Virginia Tech, which was No. 2 in the division.

Virginia Tech broke its two-game losing streak by defeating non-conference foe East Carolina on November 5. The victory was the start of a four-game win streak that brought Virginia Tech to the end of the regular season and restored its national ranking to No. 12 after falling to No. 23 following the North Carolina loss.

=== Tennessee ===
The Tennessee Volunteers entered the 2009 season following a 2008 campaign that ended with a bowl-ineligible 5–7 record. After the 2008 season ended, Tennessee fired head coach Phillip Fulmer and replaced him with Lane Kiffin, who promised to turn the program around. Kiffin made an offseason splash by breaking the social norms among SEC head football coaches and violating a handful of NCAA rules. In a season-opening win over Western Kentucky, Kiffin appeared to have made a difference for Tennessee, as the Volunteers had their largest margin of victory in nine years.

That victory was followed by consecutive losses, however, against UCLA and No. 1-ranked Florida. Tennessee ended its losing streak with a win against Ohio, then began alternating wins and losses. The victory against Ohio was followed by a loss to Auburn. A win against Georgia preceded a loss to No. 2 Alabama on a last-second blocked field goal and a win against No. 22 South Carolina. After South Carolina, Tennessee beat Memphis to create its first winning streak of the season. That streak abruptly ended the following week, when Tennessee lost to Mississippi.

The Volunteers won their last two games of the regular season—against Vanderbilt and Kentucky—bringing them to a record of 7–5. At no time during the season was Tennessee ranked in the national top-25 polls, and Tennessee was never in consideration to play in the SEC Championship Game because of its early loss to Florida.

== Pregame buildup ==
In the weeks before the game, media coverage focused on the geographic rivalry between the two teams, the controversies surrounding Lane Kiffin, and the performances of the players on each team. Virginia Tech played in the Chick-fil-A Bowl in 2006, losing to Georgia 31–24, and the 2009 game was its fourth appearance in the game. It was Tennessee's fifth appearance in the game, and the Volunteers had most recently lost to Clemson in the 2004 contest, 27–14. Entering the Chick-fil-A Bowl, Virginia Tech was 0–2 in games held in Atlanta during 2010, it had lost four consecutive games to SEC foes, and it had never won back-to-back bowl games (Tech won the 2009 Orange Bowl). Despite those factors, Virginia Tech was an early 4.5-point favorite and was listed as a 5.5-point favorite by spread bettors on the day before the game.

=== Geographic rivalry ===
The University of Tennessee and Virginia Tech are separated by only 233 miles (375 km) by road, and no major university lies between the two, creating an intense geographical rivalry in that region of the Appalachian Mountains. As Virginia Tech linebacker Cody Grimm said before the game, "(In) Southwest Virginia, you are either a Tennessee fan or a Tech fan. Now we actually get a chance to play them."

Despite the proximity of the two schools, the 2009 Chick-fil-A Bowl was only their eighth football meeting. Tennessee held a 5–2 advantage in the series, but before 1994, the last meeting between them was in 1937. The 1994 meeting was in the 1994 Gator Bowl, which the Volunteers won 45–23. Each school rapidly sold its allotment of 17,000 tickets, and publicly available tickets were sold out before the matchup was announced. This gave the Chick-fil-A Bowl its 13th consecutive sellout.

=== Tennessee coaching turmoil ===
In the weeks leading up to the Chick-fil-A Bowl, the number of controversies surrounding Tennessee head coach Lane Kiffin continued to grow. Throughout the regular season, he was linked to violations of NCAA rules and actions that appeared to fall outside the norm for SEC coaches. He was mentioned in a rap song by Lil Wayne, and his combative attitude toward opposing coaches caused friction within the SEC. In the second week of December, he was connected to an ongoing scandal in which Tennessee hostesses allegedly helped lure recruits to Tennessee, violating NCAA rules. Despite these problems, he was a successful recruiter, and gained commitments from sought-after recruits in the leadup to the Chick-fil-A Bowl.

In addition to the off-the-field issues, Tennessee underwent a pair of coaching changes in the weeks before the Chick-fil-A Bowl. Wide receivers coach Frank Wilson and running backs coach Eddie Gran each decided in the first days of December to leave Tennessee for other SEC teams. In interviews, Kiffin said the coaching changes and stories surrounding him were not a distraction from his team's bowl preparation.

=== Virginia Tech offense ===
During the 2009 season, Virginia Tech was 28th nationally in scoring offense (number of points scored) and 55th in total offense. Most of the Hokies' success came on the ground: Tech was 16th nationally in rushing offense but 98th in passing offense. A large reason for Virginia Tech's offensive success was running back Ryan Williams, who broke Virginia Tech's single-season rushing record that year. Entering the Chick-fil-A Bowl, he had 1,538 yards, only 110 short of the record. Tech running back Darren Evans, who tore his left anterior cruciate ligament before the season began, was held out of the Chick-fil-A Bowl, even though his recovery had progressed to the point that he could have participated.

Virginia Tech also was rated higher than Tennessee in every major special teams category. The Hokies were in the top 25 in both kickoff return yardage defense and kickoff returns and were No. 16 nationally in turnover margin.

=== Tennessee offense ===
At the conclusion of the 2009 regular season, Tennessee's offense was the 32nd most successful squad in the nation, scoring an average of 30.58 points per game. In terms of yardage gained, Tennessee was 48th. There wasn't much difference between the success of the rushing offense (43rd) and the passing offense (47th). Tennessee quarterback Jonathan Crompton, after struggling in 2008, improved significantly in 2009, when he passed for 2,565 yards and 26 touchdowns. In 2008, the Volunteers were 11th in the SEC in offense, averaging 145.8 yards per game. In 2009, they were third, averaging 225.6 yards per game. In addition to Crompton, running back Montario Hardesty also improved his performance from 2008 to 2009. In the season leading up to the Chick-fil-A Bowl, he had 1,306 rushing yards, just 158 short of the single-season Tennessee record, and 12 touchdowns. Entering the Chick-fil-A Bowl, Hardesty hoped to match the team's rushing record, but doubted he would be able to because of past knee injuries that made it difficult to run on artificial turf. Volunteers tight end Luke Stocker, who caught 27 passes for 370 yards and six touchdowns in 2009, was a player Virginia Tech's defense focused on in pregame preparation.

Because Tennessee's placekicking had been erratic during the regular season, Tennessee's head coach held an open competition among his three kickers to compete for the starting placekicking job in the Chick-fil-A Bowl.

=== Virginia Tech defense ===
In 2009, Virginia Tech was ranked 14th in total defense, sixth in passing defense, and 52nd in rushing defense. In scoring defense, the Hokies were 11th nationally, permitting an average of 15.75 points per game. The top individual performer on the defense was linebacker Cody Grimm, who tied for the most forced fumbles in college football during the regular season, with seven. In recognition of the achievement, he earned the Dudley Award, given annually to the top Division I football player in Virginia, and was named a first-team All-ACC and third-team All-America player. Cornerback Stephen Virgil, a starter for the Hokies in 10 of their regular-season games, was declared ineligible for the Chick-fil-A Bowl because of poor grades. Defensive coordinator Bud Foster was wooed by several other teams between the conclusion of the regular season and the Chick-fil-A Bowl, but Foster remained at Tech after the school created an annuity for Foster, granted if he remained with the team for five more years.

=== Tennessee defense ===
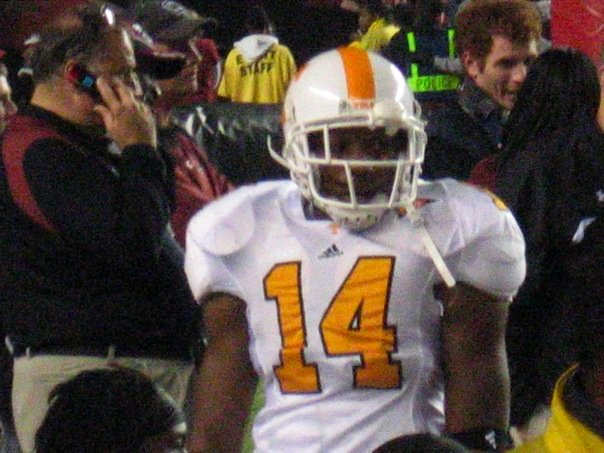
Eric Berry, seen here in 2008, was Tennessee's top-performing defensive player in 2009.

Tennessee's defense was prized for its success against opponents' passing game. In 2009, the Volunteers were 10th nationally against the pass, permitting an average of 165.92 yards per game. Against the run, they were 58th. When both facets were combined, the defense was 16th, permitting an average of 308.83 yards per game. Much of the reason for Tennessee's success against the pass was star safety Eric Berry, only the second player in Tennessee history to be named a unanimous All-American twice. He won the Jim Thorpe Award, given each year to the best defensive back in the nation. Joining Berry in the defensive secondary was Janzen Jackson, who returned to the field following three missed games caused by his alleged involvement in an armed robbery. Countering Jackson's return, Tennessee lost defensive back Brent Vinson, who was dismissed from the team for reasons unrevealed at the time. Two months after the Chick-fil-A Bowl, Vinson was charged with tampering with evidence related to a murder investigation. Tennessee defensive coordinator Monte Kiffin, interviewed 10 days before the game, said Virginia Tech's offensive strength presented problems for Tennessee.

== Game summary ==
The 2009 Chick-fil-A Bowl kicked off at 7:37 p.m. EST on December 31, 2009, in the Georgia Dome, Atlanta. Bowl officials announced 73,777 people attended the game, but that figure was based on the number of tickets sold rather than actual turnstile attendance. That attendance figure was the fourth-largest in Chick-fil-A Bowl history, including when the game was known as the Peach Bowl, and it was the 13th consecutive sellout for the game. The game was broadcast in the United States by ESPN, and was watched by an estimated 4.87 million people, earning it a Nielsen Rating of 4.2. That figure was the 10th highest among bowl games that season, and was a 36 percent increase from the previous year's rating. The sportscasters for the broadcast were Sean McDonough, Matt Millen, and Holly Rowe. Because the game was played indoors, weather was not a factor.

The ceremonial playing of the national anthem was performed by trumpeter Dan Oxley. The game's referee was Ed Ardito, its umpire was Greg Adams, and its linesman was Jim Laborde, all of Conference USA. A military veteran from each school was invited to the ceremonial pregame coin toss to determine first possession.

=== First quarter ===
Tennessee won that ceremonial coin toss and chose to kick off to begin the game, ensuring the Volunteers received the ball to begin the second half. Tennessee placekicker Chad Cunningham delivered the ball from the tee, and Virginia Tech's Dyrell Roberts returned it to the Tech 26-yard line, where Virginia Tech began the game's first offensive drive. Two running plays by Tech's Ryan Williams gained 4 yards, then Tech quarterback Tyrod Taylor completed a seven-yard pass for the game's initial first down. Tech advanced as far as its 43-yard line, but a five-yard false-start penalty prevented the Hokies from gaining another first down. They punted the ball to Tennessee, which began its first drive of the game from its 11-yard line.

Two running plays gained 11 yards and a first down, then Tennessee quarterback Jonathan Crompton began throwing the ball. His first pass the game fell incomplete, and his second was intercepted by Virginia Tech defender Rashad Carmichael, who ran it back to the Tennessee 44-yard line. Tech's second drive of the game thus began in Tennessee's defensive half. The first play of the drive was a 20-yard throw from Taylor to wide receiver Jarrett Boykin. That completed pass was the longest play of the drive, which continued through short rushes and passes. On the seventh play after the interception, Williams ran the ball forward one yard, crossing the goal line for the game's first touchdown. Tech placekicker Matt Waldron successfully converted the extra point, and with 6:56 remaining in the first quarter, Tech led 7–0.

Virginia Tech's post-score kickoff was returned to the Tennessee 25-yard line, but the Volunteers failed to gain a first down on their second drive of the game, going three-and-out. They punted, returning the ball to Virginia Tech at the Hokies' 31-yard line. Taylor completed a 14-yard pass to Roberts and a 10-yard throw to Marcus Davis for two first downs, advancing the Hokies into Tennessee's half of the field, but Virginia Tech's drive petered out after Williams was tackled for a three-yard loss and the Hokies were unable to regain the lost yardage. Tech punted to the Tennessee 10-yard line, where the Volunteers took over on offense with 1:16 remaining in the quarter. Crompton completed a passing play that lost three yards, then Tennessee regained two of those yards with a running play as time expired in the quarter with Tech leading, 7–0.

=== Second quarter ===
The second quarter began with Tennessee facing third down and 11 from its 9-yard line. The first play of the quarter ended in a two-yard loss for Tennessee, and the Volunteers punted after their second consecutive three-and-out. Starting at Tennessee's 46-yard line after the punt, Tech quarterback Taylor completed a 42-yard pass to Danny Coale on the Hokies' first play of the quarter, giving Virginia Tech a first down at the Tennessee 4-yard line. There, however, Tennessee's defense stiffened. Tech was stopped for no gain on consecutive plays, but on third down the Volunteers committed a facemask penalty, giving Virginia Tech a first down at the 1-yard line. Even then, it took Ryan Williams two plays to gain the momentum needed to cross the goal line for Virginia Tech's second touchdown. The score and subsequent extra point gave the Hokies a 14–0 lead with 11:56 remaining before halftime.

Virginia Tech's kickoff was downed for a touchback, and Tennessee started its drive from its 20-yard line. On the second play of the possession, Crompton completed a 40-yard pass to wide receiver Denarius Moore. The play gave Tennessee its first plays inside Virginia Tech territory, and the Volunteers capitalized on the field position. After two rushing plays were stymied for no gain or losses, Crompton completed a 15-yard pass to wide receiver Gerald Jones. Crompton was sacked on the next play, but two plays later completed a 20-yard throw to Jones, who ran out of bounds at the Tech 4-yard line, giving Tennessee another first down. Two plays later, running back Montario Hardesty ran forward four yards into the end zone, halving Virginia Tech's lead. After the extra point, Virginia Tech still led, 14–7, with 6:43 remaining in the first half.

Following Tennessee's score, the two teams traded possessions as each offense went three-and-out. Virginia Tech's offense then began a drive from its 40-yard line with 3:21 remaining in the half. Williams gained a first down with a pair of five-yard running plays, and Taylor gained 21 yards on another running play. Tech advanced to the Tennessee 31-yard line, where Taylor was sacked for a loss of nine yards. In an effort to recover the lost field position, Taylor threw a pass downfield, but the ball was intercepted by Tennessee's Janzen Jackson, who returned it to the Tech 48-yard line. Tennessee's offense entered the field of play with 1:11 remaining in the quarter, and it moved quickly. On the first play of the drive, a Crompton pass was caught by Hardesty for a 47-yard gain. Two plays later, Crompton completed a two-yard toss to Moore for a touchdown. The extra point tied the game at 14 with 18 seconds remaining before halftime.

Tennessee's post-touchdown kickoff was returned to the Tech 33-yard line, but Virginia Tech decided to not run an inconsequential play to drain the final seconds from the clock and enter halftime. On the first play after the kickoff, Taylor threw a surprise pass downfield to Boykin, who was tackled at the Tennessee four-yard line. Instant replay revealed there were two seconds remaining on the game clock after the play, and Virginia Tech placekicker Matt Waldron came onto the field to complete a 21-yard field goal as time expired. The Hokies thus regained a 17–14 lead at halftime.

=== Third quarter ===
Because Virginia Tech received the ball to begin the game, Tennessee received the ball to begin the second half. After a short return, Tennessee's offense started the half from its 30-yard line. Crompton completed passes of 11 and 8 yards, then Virginia Tech's defense halted the Tennessee advance and forced a punt. Virginia Tech's offense began its first drive of the second half at its 26-yard line, with 13:02 remaining in the quarter. From the 26, Tech began an eight-play drive that saw Ryan Williams carry the ball on seven consecutive plays. Only the final play of the drive, a one-yard touchdown run by Tyrod Taylor, didn't feature the Tech running back. Williams opened the drive with a 21-yard sprint and had a 32-yard run during the possession that ended with Taylor's touchdown at the 8:42 mark in the quarter. The touchdown and extra point extended Tech's lead to 24–14.

Tennessee attempted to answer Tech's score in its following possession. The Hokies' kickoff resulted in a touchback, so the Volunteers began from their 20-yard line. Montario Hardesty gained a first down with a 10-yard run, then Crompton gained another first down with an 11-yard pass. Tennessee continued to advance on running plays and a 14-yard pass by Crompton, pushing the ball inside the Tech 30-yard line. Once there, however, the Hokies rallied by sacking Crompton for a seven-yard loss. A two-yard run and an incomplete pass kept Tennessee from gaining another first down, setting up a fourth down. Rather than try an offensive play and possibly gain a first down or turn the ball over on downs, Tennessee punted, forcing Virginia Tech's offense to start from its 11-yard line.

Building on the rushing success of its previous drive, Virginia Tech used fullback Josh Oglesby in tandem with Williams, who also figured prominently in the team's second possession of the half. The two men combined for 19 yards on the first three plays of the drive, then Williams exited the game because of an injury. After play resumed, Taylor gained 10 yards on a rushing play and completed a 23-yard pass before Oglesby carried the ball again. When the third quarter ended, Virginia Tech faced second down at the Tennessee 30-yard line, still leading 24–14.

=== Fourth quarter ===
Virginia Tech began the quarter in possession of the ball in Tennessee territory, attempting to capitalize upon a drive begun in the third quarter. Tennessee's defense, however, allowed only one yard on the first two plays of the quarter, and Tech placekicker Waldron returned to the field to convert a 46-yard field goal, extending Virginia Tech's lead to 27–14 with 13:33 left in the game.

After Virginia Tech's post-score kickoff and a short return, Tennessee's offense started from its 31-yard line. A five-yard penalty against Virginia Tech was followed by a five-yard first-down run by Hardesty. Tennessee attempted to move its offense quickly in order to maximize the chances of closing Virginia Tech's lead by scoring fast. Crompton completed an 18-yard pass, advancing the Volunteers into Tech territory, but he was sacked by the Tech defense and Tennessee committed a five-yard false start penalty, forcing the Volunteers to punt. The kick rolled into the end zone for a touchback, and Tech's offense returned to the field at its 20-yard line.

As in the previous two drives, Virginia Tech relied upon its rushing offense: The first five plays of the drive were runs by David Wilson, who gained 26 yards. The Hokies then switched gears, surprising Tennessee, whose defense allowed a 30-yard pass completion from Taylor to Boykin. Tech reverted to running plays, but Tennessee again allowed a long gain, as Roberts advanced 21 yards on a run, then Wilson ran three yards into the end zone. The touchdown and extra point gave Virginia Tech a 34–14 lead with 5:14 remaining in the game.

Tech's kickoff was returned to the Tennessee 25-yard line, but on the first play of the Volunteers' drive, Crompton was sacked by Jason Worilds and fumbled the ball. The loose ball was recovered by Virginia Tech's John Graves at the Tennessee 13-yard line. The Hokies' offense returned to the field and began running out the clock with running plays, which keep the game clock ticking as long as the ball carrier is tackled in the field of play. Three rushing plays failed to gain a first down, but they drained more than two minutes from the game clock, and Tech's Waldron extended the Hokies' lead to 37–14 with a 22-yard field goal.

Tennessee had one final opportunity to score after receiving Virginia Tech's kickoff with 2:38 remaining. Jonathan Crompton threw several passes downfield, completing throws of 9, 9, 8, and 26 yards, advancing the Volunteers toward the end zone. Inside the Virginia Tech red zone, however, the Volunteers found less success. They committed a false start penalty, advanced the ball with a five-yard run, then Crompton threw two incomplete passes. On fourth down, Crompton was sacked for a 14-yard loss, the Volunteers' final play of the game. Virginia Tech knelt on the ball to run the final seconds off the clock and clinch the 37–14 victory.

=== Scoring summary ===
Scoring summary

Quarter	Time	Drive			Team	Scoring information	Score	
Quarter	Time	Plays	Yards	TOP	Team	Scoring information	VT	UT
1	6:56	7	44	3:14	VT	Ryan Williams 1-yard touchdown run, Matt Waldron kick good	7	0
2	11:56	5	46	2:29	VT	Ryan Williams 3-yard touchdown run, Matt Waldron kick good	14	0
2	6:43	10	80	5:13	UT	Montario Hardesty 4-yard touchdown run, Devin Mathis kick good	14	7
2	0:18	3	48	0:53	UT	Denarius Moore 2-yard touchdown reception from Jonathan Crompton, Devin Mathis kick good	14	14
2	0:00	2	63	0:18	VT	21-yard field goal by Matt Waldron	17	14
3	8:42	8	74	4:20	VT	Tyrod Taylor 1-yard touchdown run, Matt Waldron kick good	24	14
4	13:36	9	60	4:42	VT	46-yard field goal by Matt Waldron	27	14
4	5:14	8	80	4:38	VT	David Wilson 3-yard touchdown run, Matt Waldron kick good	34	14
4	2:38	4	8	2:20	VT	22-yard field goal by Matt Waldron	37	14
"TOP" = time of possession. For other American football terms, see Glossary of American football.							37	14

== Statistical summary ==
Statistical comparison
	VT	TENN
1st downs	19	14
Total yards	438	240
Passing yards	209	235
Rushing yards	229	5
Penalties	5-30	4-28
3rd down conversions	8-14	4–11
4th down conversions	0-0	0–1
Turnovers	1	2
Time of possession	33:35	26:25

In recognition of his performance, Virginia Tech running back Ryan Williams was named the game's most valuable player. On 25 carries, Williams accumulated 117 rushing yards and two touchdowns. Williams also caught two passes: one that gained six yards and one that lost six yards. Williams' performance, coupled with success early in the season, allowed him to set Tech's single-season rushing record with 1,655 yards. The game was Williams' 10th of at least 100 yards that season. Williams also set two ACC records: His touchdowns gave him 21 rushing touchdowns on the season and 22 total touchdowns.

Alone, Williams had more rushing yards than all of Tennessee's players combined. Tennessee's leading rusher was Montario Hardesty, who carried the ball 18 times for 39 yards and a touchdown. Hardesty had 1,345 rushing yards on the season, the fourth-highest season total for any player in Tennessee's history. Tennessee's No. 2 rusher was Tauren Poole, who gained 15 yards on 3 carries. Collectively, Tennessee had just five yards net rushing, the second-least ever in a Tennessee bowl game and the least allowed by Virginia Tech in a bowl game. Most of Tennessee's rushing gains were negated when quarterback Jonathan Crompton was sacked six times, losing 55 yards.

Though ineffective on the ground, Crompton outperformed Virginia Tech quarterback Tyrod Taylor in the passing game. Crompton completed 15 of 26 pass attempts for 235 yards, one touchdown, and one interception. Crompton finished the season with 27 touchdown passes, third-most in school history, and had the fourth-most pass attempts, ninth-most completions, and eighth-most yards for a Tennessee season. Virginia Tech quarterback Tyrod Taylor completed 10 of 17 passes for 209 yards and one interception.

Tennessee's Herman Lathers led all defenders with 12 total tackles, including 2 tackles for loss, both career highs. The game's No. 2 tackler was Tennessee's Dan Williams, who tied a career-high by recording nine tackles, including half a sack. Virginia Tech's leading tackler was Lyndell Gibson, who had eight tackles, including half a tackle for loss. Virginia Tech's John Graves, participating in his first game of the season, had two tackles for loss, including a sack, and forced a fumble. Virginia Tech's other forced turnover was an interception caught by cornerback Rashad Carmichael. Tennessee's Janzen Jackson had the Volunteers' only interception.

Virginia Tech kicker Matt Waldron set a school record for most field goals in a bowl game (3) and tied the school record for the longest bowl-game field goal with his 46-yard kick.

== Postgame effects ==
Virginia Tech's victory gave the team its sixth consecutive 10-win season and brought the Hokies to a final 2009 record of 10–3. It was the first time in school history that Tech won bowl games in consecutive years. Tennessee's loss dropped it to 7–6, and the Volunteers remained unranked in the final college football polls of the year. Virginia Tech was credited for its bowl-game win and rose to 10th in both the Associated Press and coaches' polls. Visiting fans generated an estimated $31.2 million in business for the Atlanta area.

Several players from each team participated in all-star games following the Chick-fil-A Bowl. Virginia Tech's Kam Chancellor, Sergio Render and Stephan Virgil played in the 2010 East–West Shrine Game. Tennessee's Morgan Cox, Chris Scott and Dan Williams played in the Senior Bowl, while Jonathan Crompton and Vladimir Richard participated in the Texas vs The Nation game. These all-star games were a chance for graduating players to highlight their skills before the 2010 NFL draft, which took place in April. A handful of players from each team were selected through the draft to play for National Football League teams.

Tennessee had six players selected, including two in the first round: safety Eric Berry was the fifth selection overall, followed by Dan Williams (26), Montario Hardesty (59), Jacques McClendon (129), Chris Scott (151), and Jonathan Crompton (168). Virginia Tech had five players selected: Jason Worilds was picked 52nd overall, followed by Kam Chancellor (133), Ed Wang (140), Brent Bowden (172), and Cody Grimm (210).

In addition to player changes, Tennessee saw coaching changes. Two weeks after the Chick-fil-A Bowl defeat, Tennessee head coach Lane Kiffin announced he was leaving the team to become the new head coach of the University of Southern California football team. The decision shocked Tennessee administrators and fans, who believed Kiffin would stay longer than one season. To replace Kiffin, Tennessee hired Derek Dooley, who had been coaching football at Louisiana Tech. Defensive coordinator Monte Kiffin and assistant head coach and recruiting coordinator Ed Orgeron also left with Kiffin. They were replaced by Justin Wilcox and Chuck Smith, respectively.

Dooley also changed position coaches, naming Terry Joseph defensive backs coach and Eric Russell special teams coach. To coach quarterbacks, he brought in Darin Hinshaw of Memphis. He hired Charlie Baggett to coach wide receivers and serve as assistant head coach, and added assistant coach Harry Hiestand and strength and conditioning coach Bennie Wylie. He retained offensive coordinator Jim Chaney from Kiffin's staff.
