= 2009 Tennessee Volunteers football team =

American college football season

2009 Tennessee Volunteers football

Chick-fil-A Bowl, L 14–37 vs. Virginia Tech
- Conference: Southeastern Conference
- Eastern Division
- Record: 7–6 (4–4 SEC)
- Head coach: Lane Kiffin (1st season)
- Offensive coordinator: Jim Chaney (1st season)
- Offensive scheme: Pro–style
- Defensive coordinator: Monte Kiffin (1st season)
- Base defense: 4–3
- Home stadium: Neyland Stadium

2009 Southeastern Conference football standings
	Conf.			Overall
Team	W		L	W		L
Eastern Division
No. 3 Florida x%	8	–	0	13	–	1
Georgia	4	–	4	8	–	5
Tennessee	4	–	4	7	–	6
Kentucky	3	–	5	7	–	6
South Carolina	3	–	5	7	–	6
Vanderbilt	0	–	8	2	–	10
Western Division
No. 1 Alabama x$#	8	–	0	14	–	0
No. 17 LSU	5	–	3	9	–	4
No. 20 Ole Miss	4	–	4	9	–	4
Arkansas	3	–	5	8	–	5
Auburn	3	–	5	8	–	5
Mississippi State	3	–	5	5	–	7
Championship: Alabama 32, Florida 13
# – BCS National Champion; $ – BCS representative as conference champion; % – BCS at-large representative; x – Division champion/co-champions; Rankings from AP Poll

The 2009 Tennessee Volunteers football team represented the University of Tennessee in the 2009 NCAA Division I FBS football season. The team was coached by Lane Kiffin. The 2009 season was Kiffin's first and only at Tennessee; he left to take the head coaching job at the University of Southern California (USC) on January 12, 2010. The Vols played their home games in Neyland Stadium and competed in the Eastern Division of the SEC. The Vols finished the season 7–6, 4–4 in SEC play, and lost in the Chick-fil-A Bowl 37–14 to Virginia Tech.

== Personnel ==
=== Coaching staff ===
- Lane Kiffin – Head coach
- Monte Kiffin – Defensive coordinator
- Jim Chaney – Offensive coordinator/offensive line coach
- Ed Orgeron – Associate head coach/defensive line coach/recruiting coordinator
- Frank Wilson – Wide receivers coach
- Lance Thompson – Linebackers coach
- Eddie Gran – Runningbacks/special teams coach
- Willie Mack Garza – Defensive backs coach
- David Reaves – Quarterbacks coach
- James Cregg – Tight ends/tackles coach

== Recruiting ==
College recruiting (2009)
Name	Hometown	School	Height	Weight	Commit date
Jerod Askew; LB	Chesapeake, VA	Oscar F. Smith	6 ft 0 in (1.83 m)	230 lb (100 kg)	Oct 8, 2008
Jerod Askew; LB	Recruit ratings: Scout: Rivals:				
Bryce Brown; RB	Wichita, KS	East	6 ft 0 in (1.83 m)	215 lb (98 kg)	Mar 16, 2009
Bryce Brown; RB	Recruit ratings: Scout: Rivals:				
Mike Edwards; DB	Cleveland, OH	Glenville	5 ft 10 in (1.78 m)	175 lb (79 kg)	Jan 25, 2009
Mike Edwards; DB	Recruit ratings: Scout: Rivals:				
Eric Gordon; DB	Nashville, TN	Hillsboro	5 ft 11 in (1.80 m)	188 lb (85 kg)	Dec 9, 2008
Eric Gordon; DB	Recruit ratings: Scout: Rivals:				
James Green; WR	Tallahassee, FL	Leon	6 ft 2 in (1.88 m)	201 lb (91 kg)	Dec 22, 2008
James Green; WR	Recruit ratings: Scout: Rivals:				
Janzen Jackson; DB	Lake Charles, LA	Alfred M Barbe High School	6 ft 1 in (1.85 m)	187 lb (85 kg)	Feb 5, 2009
Janzen Jackson; DB	Recruit ratings: Scout: Rivals:				
Arthur Jeffery; DL	Sarasota, FL	Booker High School	6 ft 4 in (1.93 m)	287 lb (130 kg)	Dec 18, 2008
Arthur Jeffery; DL	Recruit ratings: Scout: Rivals:				
Greg King; LB	Memphis, TN	Melrose	6 ft 3 in (1.91 m)	201 lb (91 kg)	Feb 4, 2009
Greg King; LB	Recruit ratings: Scout: Rivals:				
Nigel Mitchell-Thornton; LB	Stone Mountain, GA	Stephenson	6 ft 2 in (1.88 m)	230 lb (100 kg)	Aug 1, 2008
Nigel Mitchell-Thornton; LB	Recruit ratings: Scout: Rivals:				
Darren Myles Jr. DB	Atlanta, GA	Carver	6 ft 1 in (1.85 m)	180 lb (82 kg)	Feb 4, 2009
Darren Myles Jr. DB	Recruit ratings: Scout: Rivals:				
Robert Nelson; LB	Stone Mountain, GA	Stone Mountain	6 ft 0 in (1.83 m)	205 lb (93 kg)	Feb 4, 2009
Robert Nelson; LB	Recruit ratings: Scout: Rivals:				
David Oku; RB	Oklahoma City, OK	Carl Albert	5 ft 10 in (1.78 m)	187 lb (85 kg)	Mar 5, 2008
David Oku; RB	Recruit ratings: Scout: Rivals:				
Nyshier Oliver; DB	Jersey City, NJ	St. Peters Preparatory	5 ft 10 in (1.78 m)	180 lb (82 kg)	Jan 27, 2009
Nyshier Oliver; DB	Recruit ratings: Scout: Rivals:				
Kevin Revis; OL	Evensville, TN	Rhea County	6 ft 4 in (1.93 m)	270 lb (120 kg)	Jun 12, 2008
Kevin Revis; OL	Recruit ratings: Scout: Rivals:				
Nu'Keese Richardson; WR	Pahokee, FL	Pahokee	5 ft 9 in (1.75 m)	165 lb (75 kg)	Feb 4, 2009
Nu'Keese Richardson; WR	Recruit ratings: Scout: Rivals:				
Zach Rogers; WR	Nashville, TN	David Lipscomb	6 ft 2 in (1.88 m)	175 lb (79 kg)	Jul 26, 2008
Zach Rogers; WR	Recruit ratings: Scout: Rivals:				
JerQuari Schofield; OL	Aiken, SC	South Aiken	6 ft 6 in (1.98 m)	298 lb (135 kg)	Jun 16, 2008
JerQuari Schofield; OL	Recruit ratings: Scout: Rivals:				
Rae Sykes; DL	Coffeyville, KS	Coffeyville JC	6 ft 4 in (1.93 m)	255 lb (116 kg)	Jan 2, 2009
Rae Sykes; DL	Recruit ratings: Scout: Rivals:				
Marsalis Teague; ATH	Paris, TN	Henry County	5 ft 10 in (1.78 m)	175 lb (79 kg)	Feb 4, 2009
Marsalis Teague; ATH	Recruit ratings: Scout: Rivals:				
Marlon Walls; DL	Chatham, VA	Hargrave Military Academy	6 ft 4 in (1.93 m)	266 lb (121 kg)	Dec 9, 2008
Marlon Walls; DL	Recruit ratings: Scout: Rivals:				
Toney Williams; RB	Alpharetta, GA	Milton	6 ft 2 in (1.88 m)	227 lb (103 kg)	Dec 9, 2008
Toney Williams; RB	Recruit ratings: Scout: Rivals:				
Overall recruit ranking: Scout: 8 Rivals: 10
Note: In many cases, Scout, Rivals, 247Sports, On3, and ESPN may conflict in their listings of height and weight.; In these cases, the average was taken. ESPN grades are on a 100-point scale.; Sources: "tennessee.rivals.com/commitlist.asp". Rivals.; "Scout.com Football Recruiting: Tennessee". Scout.; "Scout.com Team Recruiting Rankings". Scout.; "2009 Team Ranking". Rivals.com.

== Schedule ==
Date	Time	Opponent	Site	TV	Result	Attendance
September 5	12:21 p.m.	Western Kentucky*	Neyland Stadium; Knoxville, TN	SECN	W 63–7	98,761
September 12	4:00 p.m.	UCLA*	Neyland Stadium; Knoxville, TN	ESPN	L 15–19	102,239
September 19	3:30 p.m.	at No. 1 Florida	Ben Hill Griffin Stadium; Gainesville, FL (Third Saturday in September)	CBS	L 13–23	90,894
September 26	7:00 p.m.	Ohio*	Neyland Stadium; Knoxville, TN	Vols PPV	W 34–23	95,535
October 3	7:45 p.m.	Auburn	Neyland Stadium; Knoxville, TN (Auburn–Tennessee football rivalry)	ESPN	L 22–26	102,941
October 10	12:21 p.m.	Georgia	Neyland Stadium; Knoxville, TN (rivalry)	SECN	W 45–19	103,261
October 24	3:30 p.m.	at No. 1 Alabama	Bryant–Denny Stadium; Tuscaloosa, AL (Third Saturday in October)	CBS	L 10–12	92,012
October 31	7:45 p.m.	No. 21 South Carolina	Neyland Stadium; Knoxville, TN (rivalry)	ESPN	W 31–13	96,263
November 7	7:00 p.m.	Memphis*^{†}	Neyland Stadium; Knoxville, TN	ESPNU	W 56–28	94,636
November 14	12:00 p.m.	at Ole Miss	Vaught–Hemingway Stadium; Oxford, MS (rivalry)	CBS	L 17–42	61,422
November 21	7:00 p.m.	Vanderbilt	Neyland Stadium; Knoxville, TN (rivalry)	ESPNU	W 31–16	100,124
November 28	7:00 p.m.	at Kentucky	Commonwealth Stadium; Lexington, KY (Battle for the Barrel)	ESPNU	W 30–24 ^{OT}	70,981
December 31	7:30 p.m.	vs. No. 12 Virginia Tech*	Georgia Dome; Atlanta, GA (Chick-fil-A Bowl)	ESPN	L 14–37	73,777
*Non-conference game; ^{†}Homecoming; Rankings from AP Poll released prior to the game; All times are in Eastern time

Schedule source: Dates and Matchups for all SEC Football Games for the 2009 SEC Season

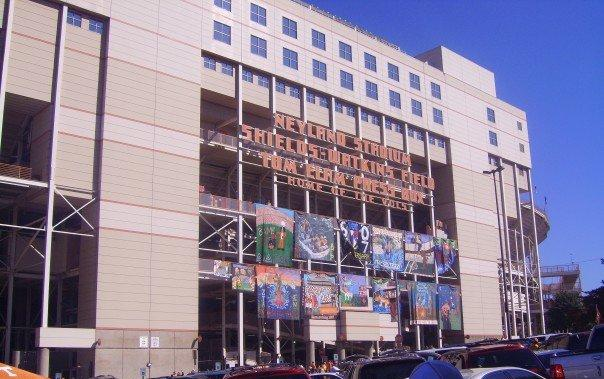
Neyland Stadium hosted eight Tennessee home games in 2009.

== Game summaries ==
=== Western Kentucky ===
Team	1	2	3	4	Total
Hilltoppers	0	0	7	0	7
• Volunteers	0	28	7	28	63

- Location: Neyland Stadium
  Knoxville, Tennessee
- Game start: 12:21 p.m.
- Elapsed time: 3:06
- Game attendance: 98,761
- Game weather: Sunny and clear, 78 °F (26 °C)
- Referee: Hubert Owens
- Television network: SECN

Tennessee coach Lane Kiffin's tenure on Rocky Top got off to a smooth start. Jonathan Crompton threw five touchdown passes, leading the Volunteers to a 63–7 rout of Football Bowl Subdivision newcomers Western Kentucky and their largest margin of victory in nine years. "This is the way that we expect to play," Kiffin said. "We have high expectations here. I just talked to them about understanding that was one game and it's over. We've got to find a way to play better next week." In its first two drives, Tennessee looked as if it hadn't learned much under Kiffin, the youngest active coach in the division. Crompton threw a pass over the middle that was easily tipped by Thomas Majors and intercepted by Jamal Forrest, and Montario Hardesty fumbled after a hard hit. The Vols settled down after the first quarter, and Hardesty carried for 18 and 22 yards to help set up a 2-yard touchdown run by freshman Bryce Brown early in the second quarter. Bobby Rainey fumbled on the Hilltoppers' next play, and LaMarcus Thompson recovered for Tennessee. Crompton connected with Luke Stocker on his first of two touchdown catches to make it 14–0 only 7 seconds later.

Tennessee's defense looked every bit the stalwart it was in 2008, while the offense found the composure it was missing in last year's 5–7 season. Running backs broke through the line of scrimmage, wide receivers ran sound routes and Crompton threw accurately. "We really just tried to get our personality as a team on film. We wanted to be physical but smart. The game we just played is part of our resume, and we want to build that resume and send it out to our opponents," Vols safety Eric Berry said. The receiving corps hardly looked depleted by injuries, with Stocker, Marsalis Teague, Quintin Hancock and Brandon Warren each catching scoring strikes. Crompton, who was pulled with 12:26 left in the game, finished 21 of 28 with two picks, and his five TD passes was one more than his output last season. Hardesty finished with 160 yards and a touchdown on 18 carries, and Brown had 104 yards rushing and a touchdown on 11 attempts. The Hilltoppers couldn't capitalize on the early turnovers and had minus-21 yards after their first 19 plays. Tennessee finished with 657 yards compared to Western Kentucky's 83.

Rainey had the Hilltoppers' only score on a 19-yard run with 2:41 in the third quarter that made it 35–7. The win was the Vols' easiest since a 70–3 victory over Louisiana-Monroe in 2000. Their 380 yards rushing were the most since 2004. The Vols were also joined by former Vols and current Indianapolis Colts quarterback Peyton Manning, who before the game announced a $1 million gift for a new athletic training center. Though the attendance in the 100,011-capacity Neyland Stadium only reached 98,761, the fans turned out in droves as Kiffin and the Vols made the traditional "Vol Walk" from their buses to the stadium before the game. "I really had to make sure that I did not go up and down today, because that's what I talked about with our team a long time last night – dealing with the emotions of a wonderful scene like the Vol Walk, a wonderful event like running through the 'T' and playing in front of 100,000 people," Kiffin said. Western Kentucky went on to go 0–12 and finish last in the Sun Belt Conference.

=== UCLA ===
Team	1	2	3	4	Total
• Bruins	3	7	9	0	19
Volunteers	10	0	0	5	15

- Location: Neyland Stadium
  Knoxville, Tennessee
- Game start: 4:00 p.m.
- Elapsed time: 3:14
- Game attendance: 102,239
- Game weather: Mostly sunny, 82 °F (28 °C)
- Referee: Matt Moore
- Television network: ESPN

Even with offensive guru Norm Chow in the press box, UCLA coach Rick Neuheisel turned to his defense with the game on the line. It was the right call. UCLA stopped Tennessee's Montario Hardesty on fourth-and-2 in the closing minutes, and the Bruins made it two in a row against the Volunteers with a 19–15 victory Saturday. "We will be a better offense," Neuheisel said. "But given the way our offense was playing, I thought it was better to put it in [the defense's] hands." Trailing by 6, the Vols (1–1) had a chance to take the lead after driving 52 yards, but UCLA (2–0) held fast and Lane Kiffin lost for the first time as Tennessee coach. The Vols' defense, led by Monte Kiffin, had been battering the Bruins' offense for much of the day. UCLA had only 186 yards of offense compared to Tennessee's 208. The Bruins had four fewer first downs, held the ball for three fewer minutes and had 60 more yards in penalties. Tennessee reached UCLA's Kevin Prince many times, but usually after he released the ball. After Hardesty was stopped, Tennessee got a safety when Dennis Rogan sacked Prince, giving him a bloody mouth. An inept Jonathan Crompton couldn't do anything with the last-minute opportunity after getting the ball back, taking a sack and throwing three incomplete passes.

Lane Kiffin said he saw a few of his players trying to point fingers in the locker room after the game. "I told them that isn't what we are. That isn't what a championship mentality is. A little bit of finger pointing came out and we have to teach them," he said. "You either win or you lose, and everybody on that team lost today." For the Bruins, the win in Neyland Stadium in front of 102,239 fans was a big step toward recovering from last year's 4–8 finish. "We're hungry," safety Rahim Moore said. "We are trying to come out every day and every weekend to prove to the world that UCLA is who UCLA is." For the Vols, it means a lot of work this week as they prepare for a trip to Florida – especially on Crompton, who unraveled after throwing five touchdown passes in the season opener against Western Kentucky.

On the first play after halftime, he threw his third interception of the day and second to Moore, who has five for the season. Kai Forbath kicked a 39-yard field goal four plays later for a 13–10 lead. "I just read the quarterback," Moore said. "I knew that Crompton had some skills, but I also knew that he could throw a pick because any quarterback can. I was just sitting back and reading the quarterback." Kiffin, who has pledged not to shuffle quarterbacks during games, stuck with Crompton. Tennessee went three-and-out on its next two drives, and Forbath answered with field goals of 31 and 47 yards to give UCLA a 19–10 lead with 2:39 in the third quarter. Forbath, who beat Tennessee with an overtime field goal in California last season, made four field goals in the rematch. Prince finished 11-for-23 for 101 yards and the one touchdown. Johnathan Franklin had 80 yards rushing. In the second quarter, Crompton fumbled a snap at the Tennessee 36, and Jerzy Siewierski recovered. A few plays later, Prince threw a 12-yard touchdown pass to Chane Moline as he was being hit, tying the score at 10 with 7:09 before halftime.

Crompton threw interceptions on the next two drives. He overthrew Gerald Jones on the first and hit Moore instead. On the second, he threw right to Alterraun Verner. "I didn't do a very good job today taking care of Jonathan," Lane Kiffin said. "I gave him a couple of calls unfortunately that didn't put him in the best position. We've got to do a better job around him." Crompton completed 13 of 26 passes for 93 yards. Hardesty finished with 89 yards rushing. But the Bruins couldn't capitalize on either. UCLA went three-and-out on the first, and Forbath missed a 51-yard field goal to end the half.

UCLA had its own problems hanging onto the ball. The Bruins fumbled five times, losing the ball once. Willie Bohannan sacked Prince, causing a fumble, and Gerald Williams recovered at the UCLA 11. Hardesty took care of the rest on the next play to put Tennessee up 10–3 with 2:58 in the first quarter. "We really didn't get into our groove as an offense," Crompton said. "When you don't, some doubts come, but the upside is we were in that game at the end. We had four turnovers and we still came up 1 yard short. That is the one positive." UCLA went on to go 7–6 and finish eighth in the Pac-10 Conference.

=== At No. 1 Florida ===
Team	1	2	3	4	Total
Volunteers	3	3	0	7	13
• No. 1 Gators	3	10	10	0	23

- Location: Ben Hill Griffin Stadium
  Gainesville, Florida
- Game start: 3:30 p.m.
- Elapsed time: 2:54
- Game attendance: 90,894
- Game weather: Partly cloudy, 89 °F (32 °C)
- Referee: Penn Wagers
- TV announcers (CBS): Verne Lundquist (play–by–play), Gary Danielson (color commentator), Tracy Wolfson (sideline reporter)

Tennessee coach Lane Kiffin jogged to midfield, briefly shook hands with Florida's Urban Meyer and then darted toward the locker room. Kiffin kept his head up the whole way. Who could blame him? After all, he had more reason to be encouraged than embarrassed after his Southeastern Conference opener against the top-ranked Gators. Tim Tebow ran for 76 yards and a touchdown, Caleb Sturgis kicked three field goals and Florida eked out a 23–13 win over the Volunteers on Saturday. It wasn't the beatdown many expected. It gave Kiffin reason to believe Tennessee (1–2, 0–1) is on the right track. It gave Meyer a big enough scare that it could help the defending national champions the rest of the way. "It wasn't how we envisioned or hoped," said Tebow, whose streak of games with a TD pass ended at 30. "But it's a win and it's good enough for all of us."

The Gators (3–0, 1–0) won their fifth straight in the series and set a school record with their 13th consecutive victory, now the longest in major college football after losses by Utah and Southern California. Florida started counting down the days for this one more than nine months ago, right after Kiffin vowed to sing "Rocky Top" all night long after beating the Gators. Kiffin also riled up Florida with his false allegations of NCAA violations by Meyer. Kiffin ran out of the tunnel just before the opening kick and had 90,000 Florida fans screaming, pointing and yelling obscenities at him. One guy even tried to torment Kiffin with a poster of Oakland Raiders owner Al Davis, Kiffin's former boss. Kiffin said afterward that his plan from Day 1 was to take the focus of his players and put it on him. "It worked perfectly," Kiffin said. "It took all the pressure off the players. We played the No. 1 team in the nation with no pressure on them. ... It was all on me. We were 30-point underdogs in this place and it really helped them go out and play ball." Kiffin refused to claim a moral victory, though. So singing "Rocky Top" will have to wait at least another year. He didn't even consider humming the tune. "No, we lost a game," Kiffin said. "Maybe I'll come back here for basketball and sing it for [coach] Bruce [Pearl]." Florida's postgame celebration was about as conservative as its game plan. There was no trash talk and no one trying to rub it in. The Gators were clearly disappointed with their performance, even though they had reason to celebrate.

Tebow, return man Brandon James and Florida's defense gave the Vols fits for the third straight year. Tebow completed 14 of 19 passes for 115 yards, although he also had two turnovers that Tennessee turned into 10 points. James returned three kickoffs for 97 yards, helping set up Florida's first 13 points, but he also dropped a pass in the end zone. And the defense harassed Jonathan Crompton and twice held the Vols to short field goals when they were in position for touchdowns. Ahmad Black intercepted Crompton on fourth down with about 2 minutes to play, ending Tennessee's last chance at pulling off the upset. "I'm not happy," said Crompton, who threw three interceptions and fumbled a snap last week against UCLA. "Don't want to lose if you're a competitor. Hate losing more than you like winning. Look at the positives. Got a chance to capitalize early and late." Tebow took over down the stretch. After his two nifty, 4-yard runs, the Gators looked like they would put the game away. But Tebow fumbled at the Vols 4, and Tennessee scored seven plays later to make it 23–13. It was Tebow's second turnover of the game. He threw an interception in the first half that Tennessee turned into a field goal. The Gators had some excuses for their lackluster offense. Receiver Deonte Thompson missed the game because of a hamstring injury. Running back Jeff Demps played with a 101-degree fever. And tight end Aaron Hernandez had to be isolated Friday because of flu-like symptoms. Meyer put it all on Tebow, who ran 24 times.

His best plays were short gains late. He started right on a third-and-3, looked to throw and then cut back left and headed toward the sideline. He eluded Wes Brown's grasp, then tiptoed down the sideline for a 4-yard gain. Instead of possibly being forced to punt, the Gators scored a touchdown to make it 23–6. "Unbelievable," Meyer said. "Vintage Tebow. He had a hell of a day. ... He kind of took that game over on that drive. That was one of the best plays. I can't wait to see that on film. He was this far from out of bounds and got the first down." On the next possession, Tebow used a nasty spin move to escape All-American safety Berry and Gerald Williams, then hit Dennis Rogan so hard the defender's helmet flew off. "I don't think he's human," Kiffin said. "I really don't. There were times when I asked [the coaches in the booth] on the headset, 'Is he ever going to wear down?' But he never does. Our defense worked hard and you just prayed to get it to third-and-4, because if it was third-and-3, he was going to put his head down and run over people." Tebow and the Gators had their heads down afterward. Meyer even said he had to lighten the mood in the locker room. "I think there's so much pressure on this team to perform perfectly, which is good," Meyer said. "I'd rather be on that end than on, 'Boy, great job. We lost by 10.' I don't want to do that. There's a lot of pressure on these guys and I felt it in there." Florida went on to go 13–1 and finish #3 in the final AP poll.

=== Ohio ===
Team	1	2	3	4	Total
Bobcats	14	3	3	3	23
• Volunteers	14	10	7	3	34

- Location: Neyland Stadium
  Knoxville, Tennessee
- Game start: 7:00 p.m.
- Elapsed time: 3:25
- Game attendance: 95,535
- Game weather: Overcast, 66 °F (19 °C)
- Referee: Marc Curles
- Television network: Vols PPV

Jonathan Crompton threw for two touchdowns as Tennessee turned to its unsteady passing game to beat Ohio 34–23 Saturday night. Crompton threw a 26-yard screen pass to Bryce Brown to give the Vols (2–2) a 31–20 lead with 2:38 in the third quarter and lobbed a 3-yard scoring strike to Brandon Warren at the end of the first.

With a stable of tough running backs, the Vols relied on their strong running game in their first three games to protect the turnover-prone passing game. Against the Bobcats, they rushed for 177 yards while Crompton completed 17 of 34 passes for 222 yards. Ohio (2–2) kept Tennessee uncomfortable by taking advantage of mistakes and passing for 319 yards against a Vols defense that entered the game allowing an average 88.33 yards by air per game. Crompton threw his eighth interception of the season to Noah Keller, who returned it 10 yards to the Tennessee 30. Theo Scott connected with LaVon Brazill on a 2-yard touchdown pass four plays later, giving the Bobcats a 14–7 lead with 7:08 in the first quarter. Scott finished 30-for-52. Brazill had 92 yards on eight catches, and Taylor Price added 90 yards on four catches. Chris Garrett took advantage of the Vols' poor special teams coverage and returned a kickoff 95 yards for a touchdown. Tennessee, which entered the game ranked fifth in total defense in the FBS, held the Bobcats to only 21 yards rushing on 17 carries.

The Vols were also strong on the ground on offense. Montario Hardesty ran 20 times for 140 yards and an 11-yard touchdown and now has 1,531 career yards rushing. Bryce Brown added 56 yards rushing and caught two passes for 60 yards, including a 34-yard catch on the second play of the game. Tennessee will have a tough time regrouping before facing Auburn at home next week with several Vols leaving the game because of injury. Coach Lane Kiffin said starting middle linebacker Nick Reveiz was likely lost for the season after taking a hard hit on his right knee. Even though rain earlier in the day kept the attendance at Neyland Stadium down, the 95,535 in attendance made up the second-largest crowd in Ohio's history. Ohio went on to go 9–5 and finish 1st in the Eastern Division of the MAC Conference.

=== Auburn ===
Team	1	2	3	4	Total
• Tigers	6	7	3	10	26
Volunteers	0	6	0	16	22

- Location: Neyland Stadium
  Knoxville, Tennessee
- Game start: 7:45 p.m.
- Elapsed time: 3:38
- Game attendance: 102,941
- Game weather: Clear, 65 °F (18 °C)
- Referee: Tom Ritter
- Television network: ESPN

Auburn took a big step under first-year coach Gene Chizik, winning on the road against a top-notch defense. Chris Todd threw for 218 yards and a touchdown, and Ben Tate ran for 128 yards and a score to help the Tigers beat Tennessee 26–22 and jumped out to their first 5–0 start since 2006 on Saturday night. "This one of those old-school, physical SEC games and we did a good job executing most of the night," Chizik said. Auburn (5–0, 2–0 Southeastern Conference), which came from behind in its other four games this season, never trailed in its first road game of the season and has now won five straight over the Vols – its longest streak in the series. Tennessee (2–3, 0–2) isn't faring nearly as well in its rebuilding efforts under new coach Lane Kiffin. The Tigers met some resistance early from Tennessee's defense, but slowly wore it down as they held the ball nearly 10 minutes longer than the Vols. Auburn's third-ranked offense racked up 459 yards. "They are so complicated," Kiffin said. "There are so many things they do." Tennessee made the score look closer when Jonathan Crompton threw a 32-yard touchdown pass to Denarius Moore as the clock expired to cut the final margin to 26–22. No extra point was attempted.

The Vols defense, which entered the game ranked eighth in the Football Bowl Subdivision, forced the Tigers to punt six times and limited them to field goals by Wes Byrum on four drives. The Auburn offense entered the game averaging 45.3 points and 526.3 yards and ranked third in the FBS. "We're trying to prove something every time we hit the field," Auburn fullback Mario Fannin said. "We know what we have in mind, and that's a championship. We're just going to keep pushing forward and get better every week." Tennessee's offense couldn't stay on the field. The Vols went three-and-out three times in the first half, and Crompton fumbled a snap at the Vols 30 on the first play of a first-quarter drive. The Vols converted only four of 17 third downs. By the middle of the second quarter, Auburn managed to take advantage of the weary Vols defense and drove 87 yards in 2:32. Tate scored on an 11-yard run to put the Tigers up 13–0 with 8:07 left before halftime. The Tigers again drove easily on the Vols on a 70-yard drive in the fourth quarter, and Todd connected with Terrell Zachery on an 11-yard touchdown pass to give them a 23–6 lead. Crompton managed to miss his receivers in every way possible: He overthrew, underthrew and hit them in the head and at the feet. He also didn't get any help from his targets, who dropped several passes that were accurately thrown.

At halftime, Crompton had completed only four passes for 62 yards. Still, thanks to some success in the Vols' 2-minute offense, he finished 20 for 43 for 259 yards and two touchdowns. "There were drops. It was bad. There was no rhythm," Kiffin said. "We're not good enough to overcome drops. You start adding those drops in, and we're going to struggle." Todd, who completed 19 of his 32 attempts, had his choice of receivers, completing passes to eight different targets. The Tennessee defense was noticeably frustrated, and defensive end Chris Walker and tackle Wes Brown spoke to the entire team in a huddle at the sideline after Tate's touchdown run. "We have to make those plays because the defense was on the field a lot of time in the first half, and that goes somewhat on us," Hardesty said. "We've got to stay on the field on third downs. We've got to keep drives going." Auburn went on to go 8–5 and finish tied for 4th in the Western Division of the Southeastern Conference.

=== Georgia ===
Team	1	2	3	4	Total
Bulldogs	0	12	7	0	19
• Volunteers	0	21	17	7	45

- Location: Neyland Stadium
  Knoxville, Tennessee
- Game start: 12:30 p.m.
- Elapsed time: 3:13
- Game attendance: 103,261
- Game weather: Cloudy, 59 °F (15 °C)
- Referee: Steve Shaw
- Television network: SECN

Tennessee coach Lane Kiffin didn't defeat Florida as promised. He did deliver on another guarantee with a 45–19 win over the Georgia Bulldogs on Saturday. "[Kiffin] basically made a promise to us that we wouldn't lose to them anymore, forever or until he leaves," Volunteers safety Eric Berry said. "He's not going to let Georgia beat us." The first-year coach got some help from Jonathan Crompton, who passed for a career-high 310 yards and threw for four touchdowns. Kiffin had emphasized the Georgia game to his players due to its importance in recruiting. Because the state of Tennessee doesn't produce many elite prospects, coaches traditionally have recruited in Georgia, and 12 current Vols hail from the bordering state – including Berry. "I told the guys last night, I don't know all the Tennessee history or tradition of all the matchups," Kiffin said. "There are a lot of great teams in this conference. But I told them, to me, this is the biggest matchup."

It was his first Southeastern Conference victory and kept the Volunteers (3–3, 1–2) from going 0–3 in the league for a second season in a row. Georgia (3–3, 2–2) dropped to 3–3 for the first time under coach Mark Richt. "They played better. They coached better. It's very obvious their team was a better team by a long shot," Richt said. The Vols' passing game had faltered at times this season, with Crompton struggling with his accuracy and his receivers often dropping passes when he was on target.

But by halftime Saturday, Crompton had already thrown for 205 yards and three touchdowns. He finished 20-for-27. Georgia's offense never reached the red zone, and the Tennessee defense held it to 241 yards compared with the Vols' 472. The Bulldogs found other ways to put up points. Brandon Boykin scored on his second 100-yard kickoff return of the season, and Bacarri Rambo returned Crompton's interception 28 yards for a TD.

Blair Walsh kicked a 52-yard field goal, and Zach Renner blocked a punt by Chad Cunningham that sailed through the end zone for a safety. "I don't know that I've ever been involved in a game where the defense didn't let a team into the red zone one time," Kiffin said. Crompton was a perfect 4-for-4 for 67 yards on a drive late in the first half, finding Marsalis Teague on a 5-yard touchdown pass for a 21–10 lead with 2:40 left. He also connected with Gerald Jones on a 51-yard score, the Vols' longest pass of the season. Despite being Tennessee's most productive receiver returning from last season, Jones had struggled with drops and mistakes while recovering from an ankle injury and wrist surgery. He had a season-best 105 yards receiving and two touchdowns. It was Georgia's Joe Cox who played the role of struggling quarterback. Cox finished 19-for-34 with 146 yards and no touchdowns. On the opening drive of the third quarter, Cox fumbled a snap, recovered and threw to Tennessee's Dennis Rogan while under pressure. The interception set up a 30-yard field goal by Daniel Lincoln to give the Vols a 24–12 lead. "It's so frustrating to come out and have so many things go wrong," Cox said. "It's embarrassing. We are not doing the things we need to do as players."

The SEC's leading receiver, Georgia's A. J. Green, finished with only 60 yards on eight catches. Its leading rusher, Tennessee's Montario Hardesty, had 97 yards on the ground and a touchdown. Richt opened his career by winning four out of his first five meetings with Tennessee, but the Vols have won three of the last four. The game has often been one of the SEC East's premier matchups, but for the first time in 38 meetings neither team was ranked coming in. "We've got a long way to go to become a good football team," Richt said. Georgia went on to go 8–5 and finish tied for 2nd in the Eastern Division of the Southeastern Conference.

=== At No. 1 Alabama ===
Team	1	2	3	4	Total
Volunteers	0	3	0	7	10
• No. 1 Crimson Tide	3	6	0	3	12

- Location: Bryant–Denny Stadium
  Tuscaloosa, Alabama
- Game start: 2:40 p.m.
- Elapsed time: 3:17
- Game attendance: 92,012
- Game weather: Partly cloudy, 61 °F (16 °C)
- Referee: Matt Austin
- TV announcers (CBS): Verne Lundquist (play-by-play), Gary Danielson (color), Tracy Wolfson (sideline)

Mount Cody kept Alabama (No. 2 BCS, No. 1 AP) perfect with a pair of super-sized plays. Terrence Cody, the Crimson Tide's 350-pound nose guard, blocked a 44-yard field-goal attempt on the final play – his second block of the fourth quarter – and Alabama escaped with a 12–10 victory over rival Tennessee on Saturday. He muscled the Tide to another win, with pure brute force. "I didn't really get off the ground," Cody said. "I just reached my arm up. That's how I got it. I knocked [the blocker] back. He was on his back." Alabama (8–0, 5–0 Southeastern Conference) was about to have its bid for perfection knocked down, too.

Then Cody broke through the line on the last play and practically ran into Daniel Lincoln's low kick. Relieved Alabama fans chanted "Cody!" as the All-American ambled toward the locker room. Leigh Tiffin booted four field goals – including a 50-yarder and a 49-yarder – to provide all Alabama's points and the Tide survived Mark Ingram's first college fumble and some problems for the nation's top defense. The last few minutes were all about survival – much like in then-No. 1 Florida's squeaker over Arkansas last week. "You talk about how fragile a season is," Tide coach Nick Saban said. "You're controlling a game, even though you may say it's winning ugly. We're still ahead 12–3 and totally controlling the game with 3 minutes, 29 seconds and the ball. That's how fragile a season can be. You make one mistake and you have to go overcome it. I hope that there's a lot of lessons our team can learn from this." His team gets some time to absorb them with an open date before No. 9 LSU visits. Tennessee (3–4, 1–3) kept alive its hopes for coach Lane Kiffin's first huge victory with Eric Berry's fumble recovery and Jonathan Crompton's 11-yard touchdown pass to Gerald Jones with 1:19 left. Then Tennessee's Denarius Moore recovered the onside kick at the Vols' 41 with no time outs remaining. Crompton hit Jones on a 14-yarder before Tennessee was pushed back by a false start. On second down, the much-maligned Crompton hit Luke Stocker for a 23-yard gain to get the Vols into position for the potential game-winning kick. But Cody and the Tide made a big push, and Alabama, second in the BCS standings, still controls its destiny in the national title race.

"It's a difficult loss to deal with," Kiffin said. "You come into a hostile environment and play the No. 1 team in the country, as I said before by far the No. 1 team in the country and the best-coached team around. You come in here and outgain them by [nearly] 100 yards and miss three field goals. "I don't believe in moral victories, we should have won that game." He said Lincoln hasn't regained his leg strength since a quadriceps injury. "He can't kick the ball up high," Kiffin said. "If you kick the ball up high it's never going to get there, so we can't allow the penetration up front." Tiffin's 49-yarder with 6:31 left had barely cleared the uprights for the 12–3 lead and, it turns out, the decisive points. That came after Cody batted Lincoln's 43-yard field goal attempt with his left hand. "Neither was an exceptionally good kick, but they both went through and that's what counts," Tiffin said. "I don't know if I watched either one of them go through." Tennessee would get new life when Ingram lost the first fumble of his career in 322 touches, giving the Vols the ball back at the Bama 43. All-American safety Eric Berry jarred the ball loose as Ingram was going down, and then recovered it. Crompton overcame a sack on the first play and completed 4-of-4 passes for 42 yards and the TD to make it 12–10. Alabama had nearly made it three games in a row without allowing a touchdown. The Volunteers now have tested two No. 1 teams. They lost 23–13 to then-No. 1 Florida earlier and Kiffin's team came even closer this time. Tennessee was unranked the last time it beat an AP No. 1, topping Auburn 38–20 in 1985. "On the sideline, we just knew we were going to win in those last 4 seconds," Stocker said. "I don't think there are enough words to explain how we feel. We are just speechless."

Alabama was held without an offensive touchdown for the first time since the Mississippi State game in 2007. The Vols outgained Alabama 341–256 and Crompton outplayed the Tide's Greg McElroy. He was 21 of 36 passing for 265 yards with an early interception. McElroy's 18 of 29 produced only 120 yards. Ingram, who emerged as a Heisman Trophy contender the past two weeks gained 99 yards on 18 carries and surpassed 1,000 yards on the season. After Cody's first block, McElroy passed for a first down and ran for another to move the Tide in position for Tiffin's field goal that made it a two-score game. After a roughing the punter on Tennessee, Alabama was in position to milk the clock and secure the victory. But the normally sure-handed Ingram gave the Vols another shot. Tennessee got close, but Mount Cody was ultimately too big to kick over. Alabama went on to go 14–0 and win the BCS National Championship game over Texas.

=== No. 21 South Carolina ===
Team	1	2	3	4	Total
No. 21 Gamecocks	0	3	10	0	13
• Volunteers	14	7	7	3	31

- Location: Neyland Stadium
  Knoxville, Tennessee
- Game start: 7:52 p.m.
- Elapsed time: 3:22
- Game attendance: 96,263
- Game weather: Light rain, 53 °F (12 °C)
- Referee: Matt Austin
- Television network: ESPN

Lane Kiffin gave his players a treat, letting Tennessee wear black jerseys for the first time in 87 years. The Volunteers thanked their coach with a resounding victory. Decked out in black jerseys for the first time since adopting orange tops in 1922, Tennessee turned three South Carolina fumbles into touchdowns and beat the Gamecocks (No. 22 BCS, No. 21 AP) 31–13 Saturday night. "It's a players' game, and our players had been begging for them for a while," said Kiffin, who got his first win over a ranked foe. "I think it gave us some energy. I think you saw that in the way they came out and played early." Captains Eric Berry and Montario Hardesty approached athletic director Mike Hamilton on Wednesday, asking to wear an all-black uniform. A local Knoxville company quickly produced the black jerseys with orange numbers. Black pants couldn't be completed in time, so the Vols opted for orange bottoms. And how's this for a twist: Tennessee helped Florida. The Gators clinched the SEC East and a spot in the conference title game when the rival Vols beat South Carolina.

After warming up in their traditional orange home jerseys, the Vols (4–4, 2/3 Southeastern Conference) seemed to take the Gamecocks by surprise as they took the field in Halloween-inspired uniforms. "The guys were excited and I think it gave us a little extra excitement and had us ready to play," Vols defensive tackle Dan Williams said. Jonathan Crompton threw two touchdowns, Hardesty ran for two more and Rico McCoy forced two fumbles. South Carolina (6–3, 3–3) fumbled on its first two drives on a rainy night, having entered the game with only five for the season. Tennessee, hampered by turnovers early in the season, did not give the ball away for the first time this season.

The Gamecocks began clicking on offense in the second half as the Vols sputtered. Stephen Garcia connected with Moe Brown on a 31-yard touchdown pass to cut the margin to 28–13 with 2:05 left in the third quarter, but it was too little too late. South Carolina outgained Tennessee on offense 365 yards to 341 and had four more first downs. Garcia completed 25 of 50 for 300 yards and an interception. Justice Cunningham coughed up the first fumble on the third play of the game, and 42 seconds later Crompton hit Austin Johnson on a 38-yard touchdown toss. Crompton completed 12 of 24 for 142 yards.

On the second play of the following drive, Kenny Miles lost the first fumble of his career, and Tennessee answered with a 14-yard run by Hardesty, who finished with 121 yards rushing. "We had two fumbles in five plays, and it's hard to beat a team when you spot them those points," Garcia said. Even when they weren't fumbling, the Gamecocks couldn't find much offense in the first half. They first made it to Tennessee territory with 9:29 left in the second quarter but stalled at the Vols 47. An illegal block by D.J. Swearinger cost South Carolina a 73-yard punt return for a touchdown by Stephon Gilmore. The Gamecocks drove 55 yards before halftime, but on third-and-3 at the Tennessee 25, Willie Bohannon dropped Miles for a 5-yard loss. Spencer Lanning kicked a career-long 47-yard field goal to cut the margin to 21–3 at the half.

Tennessee's woes on special teams continued. With Daniel Lincoln sidelined by a quadriceps injury, Chad Cunningham took over field goal duties. Lincoln had two field goals blocked in a 12–10 loss last week at Alabama, including what would have been a game-winning 44-yard shot at the end of the game. Devin Taylor blocked Cunningham's first attempt, a 40-yarder in the first quarter. His second attempt, a 39-yarder with 4:23 left in the game, was good and drew a huge cheer from what was left of the Tennessee crowd. Up 14–0 early in the second quarter, Kiffin opted to go for it on fourth-and-goal at the 2-yard line rather than attempt a field goal. Crompton found Kevin Cooper, who stumbled into the corner of the end zone. The last time the Gamecocks were ranked as high as No. 21 was before the 2007 Tennessee game, when they were ranked No. 15. South Carolina – which has never won consecutive games in the Tennessee series and only won in Knoxville once – lost that game in overtime 27–24.

"Like I told the guys, if we want to win some of these games against good teams, we've got to play well," South Carolina coach Steve Spurrier said. "We had turnovers, had a punt return called back, had some opportunities here and there, but we didn't execute." South Carolina went on to go 7–6 and finish tied for 4th in the Eastern Division of the Southeastern Conference.

=== Memphis ===
Team	1	2	3	4	Total
Tigers	0	7	14	7	28
• Volunteers	14	28	14	0	56

- Location: Neyland Stadium
  Knoxville, Tennessee
- Game start: 7:05 p.m.
- Elapsed time: 3:13
- Game attendance: 94,636
- Game weather: Clear, 57 °F (14 °C)
- Referee: Pete Gautreau
- Television network: ESPNU

Jonathan Crompton threw for a career-high 331 yards and five touchdowns and ran for another as Tennessee routed Memphis 56–28 on Saturday night.

Crompton surpassed his career high of 310 yards with a 10-yard pass to Denarius Moore on Tennessee's first drive of the second half. He tied his career high of five touchdown passes on the next play with a 16-yard connection to Moore to make it 49–7 with 12:38 left in the third quarter. Crompton finished 21-for-27 and no interceptions and was replaced by backup Nick Stephens halfway through the third quarter. Tennessee (5–4) gave coach Lane Kiffin his first winning streak and dominated the game much as it's done the series. The Vols hold a 21–1 advantage against Memphis and have won all 12 meetings in Knoxville. But the games between the state rivals often have been closer than the record indicates. Six of the 10 meetings between the two teams since 1991 have been decided by fewer than two touchdowns.

David Oku took the opening kickoff 69 yards, and Bryce Brown scored on a 1-yard run 2 minutes later. Memphis (2–7) could do nothing to catch up. The Vols never punted with Crompton in the game, though they turned the ball over when they couldn't convert a fourth-and-2 at the Tigers' 29 and when Dennis Rogan muffed a punt return. Memphis drove 93 yards in its 2-minute offense and scored on a 36-yard run by Marcus Hightower to cut Tennessee's lead to 35–7 with 58 seconds left in the half. The Vols responded with a 55-yard drive and Crompton's 1-yard touchdown run with 4 seconds on the clock.

The Tigers have been hampered with injuries this season, and it especially showed on defense. The Vols had their way passing nearly the entire game with wide-open routes. Crompton, who until a few games ago was more likely to throw interceptions than touchdowns, had his selection of scoring targets in Moore, Gerald Jones, Luke Stocker, Quintin Hancock and Nu'Keese Richardson. Stephens also hit Moore for a TD. Jones led the receiving corps with 97 yards on four catches. Crompton was only 5 yards and a TD pass short of tying his previous career high at halftime. By the break, Tennessee had outgained Memphis 382 yards to 104 and had gained 11 more first downs. Memphis entered the game with the 100th-ranked defense, giving up an average 416.5 yards. Tennessee finished with 566 yards. The Vols rank 13th in the nation in defense, but were playing second- and third-string players by the time Curtis Steele scored on a 1-yard run and again on a 3-yard run in the middle of the third quarter. The scores cut Tennessee's margin to 49–21. Steele finished with 144 yards on 21 carries in addition to the two touchdowns. Will Hudgens was 19 of 31 for 194 yards and an interception.

Tennessee's Eric Berry, the Southeastern Conference's career interception return leader, inched closer to the NCAA career record when he picked off Hudgens and returned the ball 7 yards. Berry has 494 career return yards, 5 yards shy of Florida State's Terrell Buckley. Memphis went on to go 2–10 and finish last in the Eastern Division of Conference USA.

=== At Ole Miss ===
Team	1	2	3	4	Total
Volunteers	7	7	3	0	17
• Rebels	14	7	7	14	42

- Location: Vaught–Hemingway Stadium
  Oxford, Mississippi
- Game start: 11:11 a.m.
- Elapsed time: 3:23
- Game attendance: 61,422
- Game weather: Fair, 61 °F (16 °C)
- Referee: Steve Shaw
- Television network: CBS

Dexter McCluster says being 5-foot-9 and 170 pounds has its advantages on the football field. No Tennessee defender could argue with the Mississippi standout Saturday. McCluster rushed for 282 yards and finished with 324 all-purpose yards, setting two Mississippi records, and the Rebels ran over the Volunteers 42–17. He broke the Rebels' single-game rushing record of 242 by Dou Innocent in 1995. He eclipsed the all-purpose mark of 317 yards by Deuce McAllister in 1999. "My size works to my advantage," McCluster said. "When they see me, it's too late." McCluster scored on runs of 15, 23, 32 and 71 yards in Ole Miss' first win against the Volunteers since 1983. "For 170 pounds he is special," said Ole Miss coach Houston Nutt. "He can make the first one miss. He has game breaking speed. Hs you can see, he won't just run out of bounds on a long run. He'll cut back against the grain and separate to get into the end zone." It's the most rushing yards given up by the Volunteers. Tennessee had yielded 217 yards to Colorado's Mike Pritchard in 1990 and Alabama's Bobby Humphrey in 1986. "We didn't have a way to tackle him," Tennessee coach Lane Kiffin said. "He set a school record for rushing yards, and we probably set a record for missed tackles."

Ole Miss (7–3, 3–3 Southeastern Conference) – off to its best start since 2003 – clinched bowl eligibility for the second straight year with the victory. Tennessee (5–5, 2–4) was without three of their celebrated freshmen – wide receiver Nu'Keese Richardson, safety Janzen Jackson and defensive back Mike Edwards. The trio was arrested early Thursday morning for attempted armed robbery in Knoxville. McCluster scored his first touchdown just 1:31 into the game and added another with 1:20 left in the opening quarter. His 32-yard scamper came in the third quarter and Ole Miss opened the fourth quarter with McCluster's 71-yarder. "It was a big challenge to cover him," said Tennessee defensive end Chris Walker. "We had to know where he was at all times and he lines up at wide receiver and he lines up at tailback, so it was really hard to adjust to that." Brandon Bolden added 46 rushing yards and two touchdowns for the Rebels, who finished with 492 yards of total offense, including 359 on the ground.

It was former Ole Miss coach Ed Orgeron's first return to Oxford since he was fired in November 2007 after three seasons. In his first year at Tennessee as defensive line coach the Vols have improved, but struggled against the Rebels. Jevan Snead, who was 13 of 20 passes for 133 yards, was sacked only once.

Jonathan Compton finished 20 of 37 for 176 yards and two Tennessee touchdowns. He hit Jeff Cottam with a 16-yard TD in the first quarter and Denarius Moore with a 25-yarder in the second quarter. But the Vols' offense never got untracked, gaining just 275 yards over all, 99 on the ground. Their only other score was a 27-yard field goal by Daniel Lincoln in the third quarter. Ole Miss went on to go 9–4 and finish 3rd in the Western Division of Southeastern Conference.

=== Vanderbilt ===
Team	1	2	3	4	Total
Commodores	3	7	3	3	16
• Volunteers	10	14	0	7	31

- Location: Neyland Stadium
  Knoxville, Tennessee
- Game start: 7:05 p.m.
- Elapsed time: 3:21
- Game attendance: 100,124
- Game weather: Mostly clear, 55 °F (13 °C)
- Referee: Ken Williamson
- Television network: ESPNU

Tennessee coach Lane Kiffin has had to reach so far down his depth chart because of injuries that even he wasn't sure who was on the field. The Volunteers beat in-state rival Vanderbilt 31–16 on Saturday night playing with a third-string middle linebacker, a walk-on outside linebacker and walk-on placekicker Devin Mathis. "That's the kicker, right?" Kiffin quipped when asked about Mathis. After missing the postseason last year, the battered Volunteers (6–5, 3–4 Southeastern Conference) became bowl eligible with the victory. Tennessee hasn't missed out on a bowl game in consecutive seasons since 1977–78. The Commodores (2–10, 0–8) finished without a conference win for the first time since 2002.

Tennessee entered halftime with the momentum, but Vanderbilt had plenty of chances to take advantage of a Vols defense fielding inexperience players and guys like senior linebacker Rico McCoy, determined to play despite having an injured knee. "We just couldn't take advantage of some opportunities," Vandy coach Bobby Johnson said. "It's a tough way to end the season." The Commodores had a chance to tie the game before halftime but stalled on fourth-and-2 at the Tennessee 38 with 51 seconds left. Instead, Tennessee drove for a quick touchdown to go up 24–10.

Vandy's Steven Stone was called for a 15-yard roughing the passer penalty, and Jonathan Crompton was perfect on four pass attempts. His 16-yard TD pass to Luke Stocker capped the 30-second drive. "That was a big momentum shift," Vanderbilt linebacker Chris Marve said. "That just put us down even further, so we had to come out for the second half with an ever larger deficit." Crompton finished 20-for-34 for 221 yards, two touchdowns and an interception. Montario Hardesty ran for a career-high 171 yards and a touchdown. The Vols struggled to move the ball in the second half, and Vanderbilt had a shot to pull within four points with about 6 minutes left.

On third-and-goal at the 3, MacKenzi Adams attempted a pass for John Cole in the end zone. The ball bounced off Cole and into the hands of Tennessee's Dennis Rogan, but a pass interference call on Rogan kept the Commodores' drive alive. With a fresh set of downs, Vanderbilt couldn't move the ball, and Adams took a sack for a loss of 9 yards. Ryan Fowler kicked a 32-yard field goal to make the score 24–16 with 2:54 left, and the Commodores couldn't pull any closer. Adams was 19-of-35 for 174 yards, a touchdown and an interception. Vandy's Warren Norman had 73 yards rushing and 61 yards on kickoff returns. Norman's 1,923 all-purpose yards broke Herschel Walker's SEC freshman record of 1,805. He also became the Commodores' single-season leader for all-purpose yards. "It doesn't mean too much to me because I'm not about breaking records," Norman said. "It's an honor though, just being mentioned with Herschel Walker. That's pretty cool." Crompton's third-quarter interception ended a streak of 142 straight pass attempts without one, one shy of Casey Clausen's school record of 143. After struggling to find consistency on field goals with an injured Daniel Lincoln and punter Chad Cunningham, Tennessee called on Mathis for the first time this week. Mathis hit a 25-yard field goal and connected on three extra point attempts. Mathis was a walk-on last season and nearly earned a starting job as Lincoln struggled. He spent the spring semester studying in Mexico and did not participate in the Vols' fall camp. Tennessee finished its senior day in style when senior defensive tackle Wes Brown, who's played with injured knees for the past two seasons, intercepted Adams' pass and ran 25 yards for a touchdown with 3 seconds left, carrying Norman on his back for the last 5. His teammates piled on top of him in the end zone. "Everybody was saying, 'That might have been the ugliest thing I've ever seen,'" Brown said. "I felt [Norman] hopping on my back, but I didn't want to be denied. I wanted to score, and I couldn't ask for a better ending." Vanderbilt ended the season at 2–10 and finished last in the Eastern Division of Southeastern Conference.

=== At Kentucky ===
Team	1	2	3	4	OT	Total
• Volunteers	7	7	10	0	6	30
Wildcats	14	7	0	3	0	24

- Location: Commonwealth Stadium
  Lexington, Kentucky
- Game start: 7:06 p.m.
- Elapsed time: 3:19
- Game attendance: 70,981
- Game weather: Clear, 51 °F (11 °C)
- Referee: Marc Curles
- Television network: ESPNU

Montario Hardesty ran for three touchdowns, including a 20-yard game winner in overtime, as Tennessee outlasted Kentucky 30–24 on Saturday night, the Volunteers' 25th straight victory against their border rivals. Hardesty, who also ran for a career-high 179 yards, scampered up the middle for the final score after Kentucky's Lones Seiber missed a 49-yard field goal in the Wildcats' overtime chance. Tennessee (7–5, 4–4 Southeastern Conference) made sure its streak of dominance over Kentucky (7–5, 3–5) didn't end in coach Lane Kiffin's first year on the job. The win also likely locked up a New Year's Day bowl for the Volunteers and clinched second place behind Florida in the SEC East. Kentucky forced overtime on a 33-yard field goal by Seiber, set up when Ashton Cobb knocked the ball out of the hands of Luke Stocker following a completion and the Wildcats recovered. Kentucky ended the season at 7–5 and finished fifth in the Eastern Division of Southeastern Conference.

=== Vs. No. 12 Virginia Tech (Chick-fil-A Bowl) ===
Chick-fil-A Bowl

Team	1	2	3	4	Total
• No. 12 Hokies	7	10	7	13	37
Volunteers	0	14	0	0	14

- Location: Georgia Dome
  Atlanta, Georgia
- Game start: 7:37 p.m.
- Elapsed time: 3:17
- Game attendance: 73,777
- Game weather: Indoors
- Referee: Ed Ardito
- Television network: ESPN

Ryan Williams isn't keeping track of his records. "Someone eventually will break them anyway," Virginia Tech's fantastic redshirt freshman running back said. Probably, but in just one season Williams has already made a quite an impression. He capped a brilliant debut season with a record-setting game, running for two touchdowns to power Virginia Tech (No. 11 BCS, No. 12 AP) past Tennessee 37–14 in the Chick-fil-A Bowl on Thursday night. "I just saw green," said Williams of his two touchdown runs. "When I see green, I take advantage of it." The Hokies (10–3) took the lead with a field goal in the final seconds of the first half and outscored Tennessee 20–0 in the second half on their way to a sixth straight 10-win season. The only team with a longer active streak is Texas with nine. Williams, a redshirt freshman, had 117 yards rushing to become Virginia Tech's single-season rushing leader with 1,655 yards. Williams also set Atlantic Coast Conference records with 21 rushing touchdowns and 22 total touchdowns this season but said "I really don't care about records." The Hokies outrushed Tennessee (7–6) 229–5. "Ryan was something tonight, particularly at the start of the second half," Virginia Tech coach Frank Beamer said. "We got after them good." Tennessee's star running back, Montario Hardesty, could not keep up with Williams. The Volunteers' senior had 18 carries for 39 yards and a touchdown. "We got gassed; we got tired," Tennessee defensive end Chris Walker said. "You could tell especially on defense we weren't making plays. "Ryan Williams is a really great player." Tennessee quarterback Jonathan Crompton was taken to a local hospital after the game for precautionary reasons, according to a school spokesman. Crompton suffered an undisclosed injury late in the game. Vols junior safety Eric Berry confirmed after the game he will enter the NFL draft.

Tennessee was hurt by two turnovers which led to 10 points for Virginia Tech, and a dropped pass that cost the Vols a touchdown. "For whatever reason, we didn't play well today," Tennessee coach Lane Kiffin said. "I was surprised we weren't able to run the ball better." Rashad Carmichael intercepted a pass by Crompton in the first quarter to set up Williams' first touchdown run. Crompton fumbled when sacked by Nekos Brown late in the fourth quarter. John Graves recovered at the Tennessee 13 to set up Matt Waldron's third field goal, a 22-yarder. Virginia Tech players dumped a cooler of water on Beamer seconds later. Virginia Tech fans in the sellout crowd of 73,777 cheered, and Beamer raised his fists in response. Williams sat out the fourth quarter after a left ankle sprain.

Virginia Tech fans cheered when Williams left the trainer's table and ran on the sideline, but Beamer gave the fourth-quarter carries to Josh Oglesby and David Wilson. Wilson had a 3-yard touchdown run with 5:14 remaining. Williams passed Kevin Jones' school-record 1,647 yards rushing in 2003. North Carolina's Don McCauley held the ACC records with 19 rushing touchdowns and 21 total in 1970. Clemson's C.J. Spiller matched the total touchdown mark this season. Georgia Tech's Robert Lavette also rushed for 19 touchdowns in 1982. Williams passed Jones with his seventh carry of an eight-play touchdown drive in the third quarter. He had long runs of 21 and 32 yards in the drive before setting the record on a 6-yard run to the 3. Tyrod Taylor scored from the 1 for a 24–14 lead. He completed 10 of 17 passes for 201 yards with an interception. Crompton completed 15 of 26 passes for 235 yards with a touchdown and an interception.

Waldron, who had a 21-yard field goal at the end of the first half, added a 46-yarder – the longest of his career – to push the lead to 27–14 early in the fourth quarter. Tennessee's had a chance to get back into it, but wide-open Denarius Moore dropped a deep pass from Crompton on the Vols' next drive. Kiffin said the play "really took the wind out of our sails." Williams had two short touchdown runs to give the Hokies a 14–0 lead in the second quarter. Tennessee then responded. Hardesty ran through 301-pound defensive tackle Cordarrow Thompson's tackle for a 4-yard run to cap an 80-yard drive. Janzen Jackson's interception set up Crompton's 2-yard touchdown pass to Moore with 18 seconds remaining in the first half. Instead of running out the clock, Taylor threw from his 33 to Jarrett Boykin, who was stopped inside the Vols' 5 as the clock apparently expired. Tennessee players left the field but were summoned back as a video review showed Boykin's knee hit the ground with 2 seconds remaining. "I knew that there was time left looking at the clock when Boykin made the catch," Taylor said. Waldron's 21-yard field goal gave Virginia Tech a 17–14 halftime lead. The Hokies, who won the Orange Bowl last season, have back-to-back bowl wins for the first time in school history. Virginia Tech ended the season at 10–3 and finished #10 in the final AP Poll.

== Controversy ==
On November 12, three freshman Vols players — safety Janzen Jackson, receiver Nu'Keese Richardson, and defensive back Mike Edwards — were arrested in Knoxville on charges of attempted armed robbery. Edwards and Richardson were permanently dismissed from the team on November 16. Jackson was reinstated after the charges were dropped and returned to the team for the November 28 game against Kentucky.

== 2010 NFL draft ==
The 2010 NFL draft was held on April 22–24, 2010 at Radio City Music Hall in New York City. The following University of Tennessee players were selected:

Player	Position	Round	Pick	NFL team
Eric Berry	S	1st	5	Kansas City Chiefs
Dan Williams	DT	1st	26	Arizona Cardinals
Montario Hardesty	RB	2nd	59	Cleveland Browns
Jacques McClendon	G	4th	129	Indianapolis Colts
Chris Scott	OT	5th	151	Pittsburgh Steelers
Jonathan Crompton	QB	5th	168	San Diego Chargers
