= David Wilson (running back) =

American football player (born 1991)

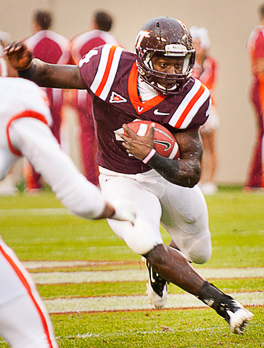
- Wilson with Virginia Tech in 2011

No. 22
- Positions: Running back, return specialist

Personal information
- Born: June 15, 1991 (age 35); Danville, Virginia, U.S.
- Listed height: 5 ft 9 in (1.75 m)
- Listed weight: 205 lb (93 kg)

Career information
- High school: George Washington (Danville)
- College: Virginia Tech (2009–2011)
- NFL draft: 2012: 1st round, 32nd overall pick

Career history
- New York Giants (2012–2013)

Awards and highlights
- Second-team All-Pro (2012) (Note: Selected as a kick returner); NFL kickoff return yards leader (2012); PFWA All-Rookie Team (2012); Second-team All-American (2011); ACC Player of the Year (2011); First-team All-ACC (2011); Dudley Award (2011)

Career NFL statistics
- Rushing attempts: 115
- Rushing yards: 504
- Receptions: 6
- Receiving yards: 42
- Return yards: 1,755
- Total touchdowns: 7
- Stats at Pro Football Reference

David Emmanuel Wilson (born June 15, 1991) is an American former professional football player who was a running back for the New York Giants of the National Football League (NFL). Wilson played college football for the Virginia Tech Hokies, earning second-team All-American honors in 2011. He was selected in the first round of the 2012 NFL draft by the Giants with the 32nd overall pick. He was forced to retire after only two NFL seasons because of a career-ending neck injury.

== Early life ==
Wilson attended George Washington High School in Danville, Virginia. As a senior, he set a school record with 2,291 rushing yards and 35 touchdowns. He was first-team all-district, all-metro, and all-region selection and the Gatorade Player of the Year for Virginia. In 2009, he played for USA Football's U.S. Under-19 National Team that won the 2009 IFAF Under-19 World Championship in Canton, Ohio and was named the tournament's MVP, rushing for 427 yards and eight touchdowns in three games.

== College career ==
Wilson attended Virginia Tech, where he played for coach Frank Beamer's Virginia Tech Hokies football team from 2009 to 2011. As a freshman in 2009, he played in all 13 games and had 334 rushing yards on 59 carries with four touchdowns. In 2010, he had 619 yards on 113 carries and five touchdowns. He also had 234 yards on 15 receptions with four touchdowns. In 2011 Wilson took over as the Hokies starting running back after Ryan Williams and Darren Evans went on to the NFL. He had a breakout year, finishing the season with a school record 1,709 rushing yards on 290 carries, and was named the 2011 ACC Offensive Player of the Year. Wilson also holds the Hokie records for most 100+ performances (10 in 2011) and career yards-per-carry (5.76).

== Professional career ==
=== Pre-draft ===
Wilson impressed the scouts at the combine, showing his athletic promise, and was widely considered a top 5 running back behind Trent Richardson. He was the top performer in the vertical and broad jumps as well as the 20-yard and 60-yard shuttle runs.

Pre-draft measurables
| Height | Weight | Arm length | Hand span | Wingspan | 40-yard dash | 10-yard split | 20-yard split | 20-yard shuttle | Three-cone drill | Vertical jump | Broad jump |
|---|---|---|---|---|---|---|---|---|---|---|---|
| 5 ft 9 5/8 in (1.77 m) | 206 lb (93 kg) | 30 1/4 in (0.77 m) | 9 3/8 in (0.24 m) | 6 ft 1 1/4 in (1.86 m) | 4.40 s | 1.50 s | 2.66 s | 4.12 s | 7.09 s | 41 in (1.04 m) | 11 ft 0 in (3.35 m) |
All values from 2012 NFL Scouting Combine/Pro Day

=== 2012 ===
Wilson was the first round pick (32nd overall) of the New York Giants.

On May 11, 2012, Wilson signed a four-year contract with the Giants worth $6.68 million that included a club option for a fifth-year and a $3.3 million signing bonus.

In the season opener against the Dallas Cowboys, Wilson lost a fumble on his second career carry and did not receive another carry for the rest of the game. On October 7, Wilson rushed for a 40-yard touchdown during the week 5 match versus the Cleveland Browns on his first carry of the game. On December 9, Wilson set the New York Giants team record for all-purpose yards in a single game when he accumulated 327 all-purpose yards in a 52-27 win over the New Orleans Saints. Wilson returned four kickoffs for 227 yards (including a 97-yard return for a touchdown) and also ran for 100 yards with two touchdowns on just 13 carries. His kick-off return touchdown was of 97 yards, and his two touchdown runs were of 6 and 52 yards. He became the first player in NFL history with 200 kick return yards and 100 rushing yards, and the second player since 1970 with a kick return touchdown and two rushing touchdowns, in the same game. He was named to the PFWA All-Rookie Team.

=== 2013 ===
In 2013, Wilson was placed on season-ending injured reserve after he suffered what doctors called spinal stenosis in Week 5 against the Philadelphia Eagles. Doctors had told Wilson that he faced an increased risk of a neck injury if he ever played again. Wilson underwent neck surgery on January 16, 2014. On August 4, he was ruled out for the year due to his neck again. He was advised not to play football again because of recurring neck injuries and announced his retirement from the NFL on August 6.

=== NFL statistics ===
| Year | Team | G | Att | Att/G | Yds | Avg | Yds/G | TD | Lng | 1st | 1st% | 20+ | 40+ | FUM |
|---|---|---|---|---|---|---|---|---|---|---|---|---|---|---|
| 2012 | New York Giants | 16 | 71 | 4.4 | 358 | 5.0 | 22.4 | 4 | 52T | 17 | 23.9 | 5 | 2 | 1 |
| 2013 | New York Giants | 5 | 44 | 8.8 | 146 | 3.3 | 29.2 | 1 | 18 | 10 | 22.7 | 0 | 0 | 2 |

== Track and field ==
Wilson was also a sprinter and jumper for the George Washington High School's track team. He won the national championship in the triple jump at the 2009 Nike Indoor Meet. He also competed in the 100 meters, he tied for 1st place at the 2009 WV District Championships, with a career-best time of 10.84 seconds.

As a member of the Virginia Tech Hokies track and field team, he placed third at the 2010 VT Indoor Challenge in the long jump, with a career-best leap of 7.23 meters. He earned first place triple jump finishes at the Miami Invitational (15.18m) and Liberty Twilight (15.16m). He also competed in the 60-meter dash, recording a career-best time of 6.86 seconds at the VT Elite Meet. In 2011, he earned his first career All-America honor, after placing sixth in the triple jump at the NCAA Championships, with a personal-best leap of 16.20 meters.

After ending his NFL career due to a neck injury, Wilson announced that he's planning a return to track and field as a triple jumper. Wilson failed to reach the final at the 2015 Adidas Grand Prix and finished ninth after posting his best jump of 14.66 meters. Wilson recorded a jump of 14.34 in his first attempt.

== Post-football career ==
Wilson had a tryout with the Baltimore Orioles' instructional league team in 2017 but was not signed.

After his football career, Wilson has also attempted to pursue a career in music.

== Notes ==
Awards and achievements
| Preceded by Ryan Williams | Virginia Tech single-season rushing record 2011–present (1,709 yards) | Succeeded by current |
