= Torrian Gray =

American football player and coach (born 1974)

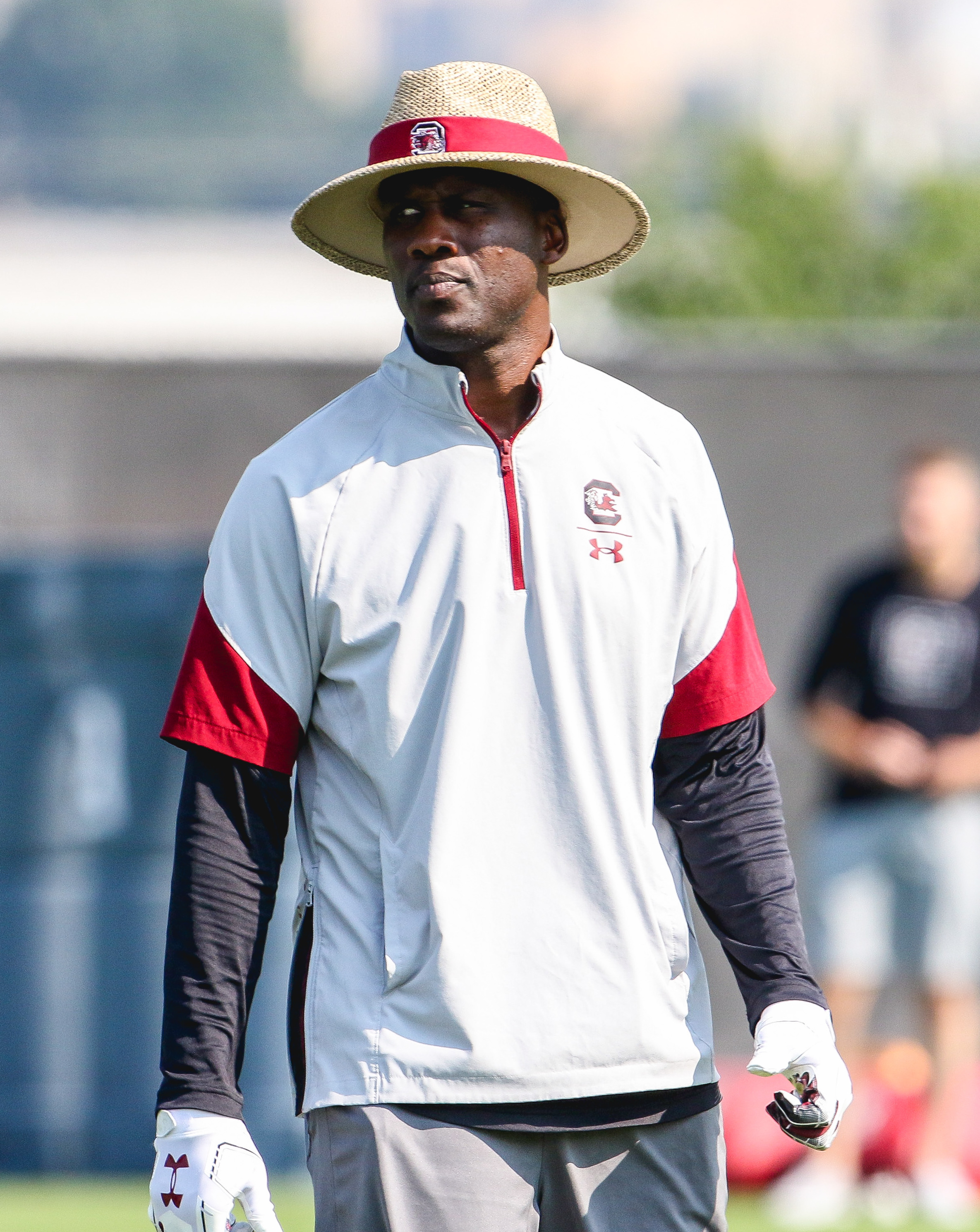
- Gray with South Carolina in 2021

Current position
- Title: Co-defensive coordinator & defensive backs coach
- Team: South Carolina
- Conference: SEC

Biographical details
- Born: March 18, 1974 (age 52); Lakeland, Florida, U.S.

Playing career
- 1992–1996: Virginia Tech
- 1997–1999: Minnesota Vikings
- Position: Free safety

Coaching career (HC unless noted)
- 2000–2001: Maine (DB)
- 2002–2003: Connecticut (DB)
- 2004–2005: Chicago Bears (DB)
- 2006–2015: Virginia Tech (DB)
- 2016: Florida (DB)
- 2017–2018: Washington Redskins (DB)
- 2019–2020: Florida (CB)
- 2021–2025: South Carolina (DB)
- 2026–present: South Carolina (co-DC/DB)

Accomplishments and honors

Awards
- 3× All-Big East

Torrian Gray (born March 18, 1974) is an American football coach and former player who is currently the co-defensive coordinator and defensive backs coach at the University of South Carolina. Also known by the nickname “Big Play Torrian Gray”.

== College career ==
Gray was three times an all-Big East selection for the Virginia Tech Hokies. His college teams won two Big East championships and in 1995, upset the Texas Longhorns in the 1995 Sugar Bowl.

== Professional career ==
Following his playing career at Tech, Gray was drafted by the Minnesota Vikings 49th overall in the second round of the 1997 NFL draft. He played two seasons with the Minnesota Vikings backing up Orlando Thomas at free safety. He started five games as a rookie, including two playoff contests. He contributed as a starter in the nickel package and as a special teams player before retiring in the spring of 2000 due to a knee injury. The Vikings advanced to the playoffs in each of his three seasons.

== Coaching career ==
Gray returned to Virginia Tech to coach defensive backs following the departure of Lorenzo Ward to the Oakland Raiders. Gray coached several players who played in the NFL including: Aaron Rouse, Brandon Flowers, Macho Harris, Kam Chancellor, Roc Carmichael, Jayron Hosley, Kyle Fuller, Antone Exum, Kyshoen Jarrett, Kendall Fuller, Chuck Clark, Terrell Edmunds, Greg Stroman, and Brandon Facyson.

On February 4, 2017, Gray was named Defensive Backs coach of the NFL's Washington Redskins.

On January 21, 2019, Gray chose to join the University of Florida football team as the Defensive Backs coach.
