= James Gayle (linebacker) =

American football player (born 1991)

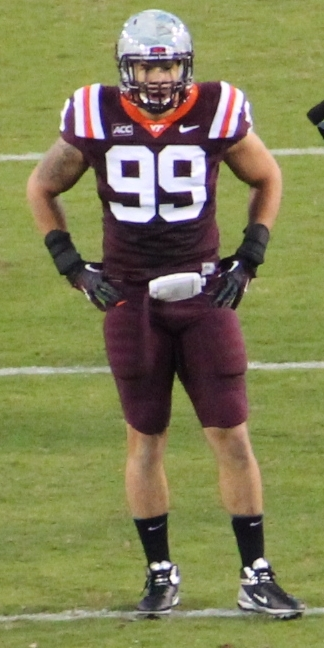
- Gayle with Virginia Tech in 2013

No. 99
- Position: Linebacker

Personal information
- Born: February 15, 1991 (age 35); Los Angeles, California, U.S.
- Listed height: 6 ft 4 in (1.93 m)
- Listed weight: 259 lb (117 kg)

Career information
- High school: Hampton (VA) Bethel
- College: Virginia Tech
- NFL draft: 2014: undrafted

Career history
- Tennessee Titans (2014)*; Washington Redskins (2015)
- * Offseason or practice squad member only

Awards and highlights
- Second-team All-ACC (2011, 2012)
- Stats at Pro Football Reference

James Rashaan Gayle (born February 15, 1991) is an American former football linebacker. He played college football at Virginia Tech. He signed with the Tennessee Titans as an undrafted free agent in 2014.

== High school ==
Gayle attended Bethel High School in Hampton, Virginia. A second-team All-Peninsula District member as a defensive end, he recorded 96 tackles (60 solo) and 12 sacks as a defensive end his senior season, and registered 56 solo tackles and 10 sacks as a junior.

Considered a three-star recruit by Rivals.com, he was rated the 25th best strongside defensive end in the nation. He accepted a scholarship offer from Virginia Tech over offers from East Carolina, NC State, Purdue, Syracuse and UCF.

== College career ==
In 2009, Gayle redshirted as a freshman. In 2010, he started two games while playing in all 14 games. He totaled 13 tackles, including 6.5 for loss, four sacks and twelve quarterback hurries. In 2011, he garnered second-team All-ACC honors after recording 38 tackles, including 12.5 for loss, seven sacks, along with 20 quarterback hurries on the season. In 2012, Gayle played in all 13 games, starting 11. He recorded 43 tackles on the season, including 11 for loss, five sacks, and 27 quarterback hurries. He earned second-team All-ACC honors for the second consecutive season. In his final season in 2013, he started all 13 games, and totaled 44 tackles, 10.5 for loss, and six sacks, and was a conference honorable mention.

For his career, he totaled 138 tackles, including 40.5 for loss, and 22 sacks.

== Professional career ==
=== 2014 NFL Combine ===
Pre-draft measurables
Height	Weight	Arm length	Hand span	40-yard dash	20-yard shuttle	Three-cone drill	Vertical jump	Broad jump	Bench press
6 ft 4 in (1.93 m)	259 lb (117 kg)	32 3/8 in (0.82 m)	9 5/8	4.70 s	4.27 s	7.19 s	37 in (0.94 m)	10 ft 2 in (3.10 m)	26 reps
All values from NFL Combine

=== 2014 NFL draft ===
Gayle, who was originally projected as a fourth or fifth round pick, was not selected in the 2014 NFL draft, despite a strong combine performance. Gayle himself said it was due to an injury he suffered from during the 2013 season. Gayle said he was upset that he fell undrafted because of his minor injury because he played with it throughout his whole Senior year. He also said it was understandable though, considering he missed the Senior Bowl with his bad shoulder.

=== Tennessee Titans ===
On May 12, 2014, it was reported Gayle signed with the Tennessee Titans as an undrafted free agent. He received shoulder surgery on June 12.

=== Washington Redskins ===
Gayle signed a futures deal with Washington on January 3, 2015. He was waived/injured on May 18. After going unclaimed by waivers, he was placed on the injured reserve list.

On June 1, 2016, Gayle was waived by Washington.

== Personal life ==
His uncle, Shaun Gayle, is a former Pro Bowler and Super Bowl champion who played safety for the Chicago Bears.
