= Ryan Williams (running back) =

American football player (born 1990)

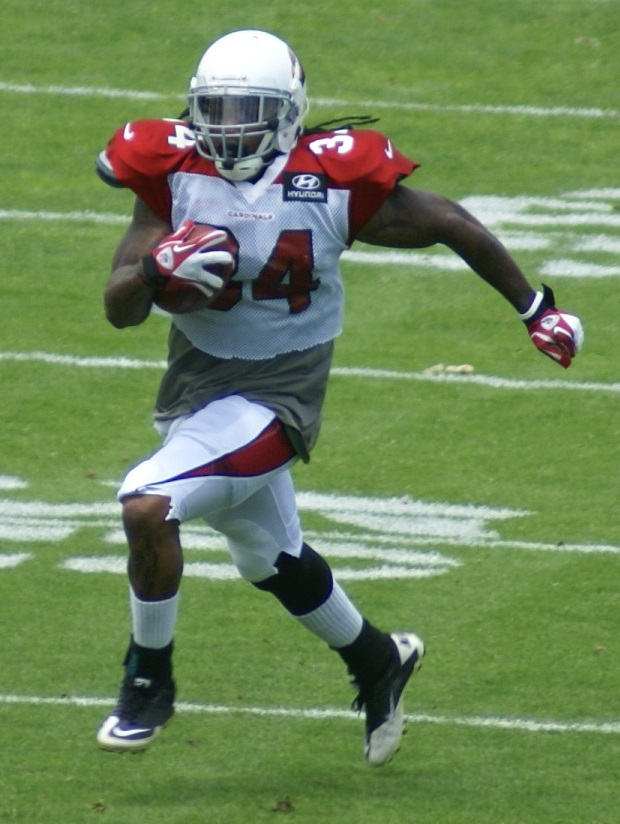
- Williams with the Arizona Cardinals in 2012

No. 34
- Position: Running back

Personal information
- Born: April 9, 1990 (age 36); Cold Spring, New York, U.S.
- Listed height: 5 ft 9 in (1.75 m)
- Listed weight: 207 lb (94 kg)

Career information
- High school: Stonewall Jackson (Manassas, Virginia)
- College: Virginia Tech (2008–2010)
- NFL draft: 2011: 2nd round, 38th overall pick

Career history
- Arizona Cardinals (2011–2013); Dallas Cowboys (2014–2015)*
- * Offseason or practice squad member only

Awards and highlights
- Third-team All-American (2009); ACC Rookie of the Year (2009); ACC Offensive Rookie of the Year (2009); First team All-ACC (2009)

Career NFL statistics
- Rushing attempts: 58
- Rushing yards: 164
- Receptions: 7
- Receiving yards: 44
- Stats at Pro Football Reference

Ryan Gene Williams (born April 9, 1990) is an American former professional football player who was a running back in the National Football League (NFL). He was selected by the Arizona Cardinals in the second round of the 2011 NFL draft. He played college football for the Virginia Tech Hokies.

== Early life ==
Williams attended Stonewall Jackson High School in Manassas, Virginia. He was the starting tailback all four years. He finished with over 2,000 rushing yards, including 1,574 yards as a junior.

== College career ==
As a freshman at Virginia Tech in 2008, Williams was redshirted. As a redshirt freshman in 2009, Williams took over as starting running back after starter Darren Evans suffered a season-ending ACL injury. Through thirteen games he rushed for 1,655 yards on 293 carries, scored 21 touchdowns, and broke multiple Virginia Tech and ACC rushing records in the process - including Virginia Tech's single season rushing yards record and the ACC single season touchdown record with 22 touchdowns. He began the 2010 season as a starter but injured his right hamstring in a game against East Carolina University and was out for three games before coming back against Duke.

On January 9, 2011, it was announced that Williams will give up his final 2 years of NCAA eligibility to make himself available for the 2011 NFL Draft.

=== College statistics ===
| Season | Team | Rushing | | | | Receiving | | |
| Season | Team | Att | Yds | Avg | TD | Rec | Yds | TD |
|---|---|---|---|---|---|---|---|---|
| 2008 | Virginia Tech | Redshirted | | | | | | |
| 2009 | Virginia Tech | 293 | 1,655 | 5.6 | 22 | 16 | 180 | 1 |
| 2010 | Virginia Tech | 110 | 477 | 4.3 | 10 | 10 | 109 | 1 |
| Totals | | 403 | 2,132 | 4.9 | 32 | 26 | 289 | 2 |

== Professional career ==
Pre-draft measurables
| Height | Weight | Arm length | Hand span | Wingspan | 40-yard dash | 10-yard split | 20-yard split | 20-yard shuttle | Three-cone drill | Vertical jump | Broad jump | Bench press |
|---|---|---|---|---|---|---|---|---|---|---|---|---|
| 5 ft 9 3/8 in (1.76 m) | 212 lb (96 kg) | 30 3/4 in (0.78 m) | 9 in (0.23 m) | 6 ft 2 in (1.88 m) | 4.49 s | 1.59 s | 2.50 s | 4.18 s | 6.96 s | 40.0 in (1.02 m) | 10 ft 3 in (3.12 m) | 19 reps |
All values from NFL Combine/Pro Day

=== Arizona Cardinals ===
Williams was selected by the Arizona Cardinals in the second round (38th overall) of the 2011 NFL draft. On August 19, during a pre-season football game against the Green Bay Packers, Williams was injured early in the third quarter in his first run of the game, suffering a ruptured patella tendon in his right knee which cost him the entire 2011 season.

On October 9, 2012, he was placed on the injured reserve list with a left shoulder injury, after playing in only 5 games. He was released on May 12, 2014.

=== Dallas Cowboys ===
Williams signed as a free agent with the Dallas Cowboys on May 17, 2014. He was cut on August 30 and signed to the team's practice squad the following day.

On June 28, 2015, Williams was waived/injured, and reverted to Dallas' injured reserve the next day. On September 15, he was released by the Cowboys with an injury settlement.
