= Janzen Jackson =

American gridiron football player (born 1990)

No. 10, 38
- Position: Safety / Punt returner

Personal information
- Born: December 14, 1990 (age 35); Lake Charles, Louisiana, U.S.
- Listed height: 6 ft 0 in (1.83 m)
- Listed weight: 187 lb (85 kg)

Career information
- High school: Lake Charles (LA) Barbe
- College: McNeese State
- NFL draft: 2012: undrafted

Career history
- New York Giants (2012)*; Sacramento Mountain Lions (2012); Toronto Argonauts (2013)
- * Offseason or practice squad member only

Awards and highlights
- Second-team All-SEC (2010)

Career CFL statistics
- Total tackles: 8
- Stats at CFL.ca (archived)

Janzen Jackson (born December 14, 1990) is an American former football safety. After playing college football for the University of Tennessee and McNeese State, he was signed by the New York Giants as an undrafted free agent in 2012.

== Early life ==
Jackson initially attended Carencro High School in Lafayette, Louisiana, until 2007 where his father, was the head coach of the football team. There, Jackson honed his skills as a corner under his father's tutelage. After totaling 93 tackles, five interceptions and blocking seven kicks as a junior, he was named Class 5A All-State by the LSWA.

After his father returned to McNeese State, Jackson attended Alfred M. Barbe High School in Lake Charles, Louisiana, where he made 92 tackles and intercepted 5 passes as a senior. He was also named Class 5A All-State a second time and received All-American honors by USA Today and SuperPrep. In addition, Jackson participated in the U.S. Army All-American Bowl.

Considered a five-star recruit by Rivals.com, Jackson was listed as No. 2 cornerback in the 2009 class. He originally committed to LSU on February 23, 2008, but rethought his choice on National Signing Day 2009, when he signed a national letter of intent to play football for Tennessee. Said Jackson: "Monte Kiffin was the difference. I love Tennessee. I have known Coach Orgeron for a while and I love him. But to realize that if you play defense at Tennessee, then you are going to know what Monte Kiffin knows is special. He invented his own defense (Tampa 2) and has been so good for so long, and now he is going to teach me what he knows. That was just too much to pass up."

== College career ==
Despite Tennessee's depth in the defensive backfield, Jackson was expected to contribute as a true freshman in 2009. He arrived at Tennessee weighing 175 lbs, but bulked up to 192 lbs. According to head coach Lane Kiffin, Jackson "already covers like an SEC cornerback and hits like an SEC safety and has a chance to lineup alongside Eric Berry as a starter on September 5 against Western Kentucky."

Until midseason, Jackson had started all but two of the Volunteers' games and had emerged as one of the better freshman players in the Southeastern Conference (SEC). He was suspended for the week 9 game against Memphis for violating team rules.

On November 12, 2009, Jackson and fellow freshmen teammates Mike Edwards and Nu'Keese Richardson were arrested after an armed robbery attempt at a Pilot station on Cumberland Avenue in Knoxville, Tennessee. Less than two weeks later, charges against Jackson were dropped because a police investigation found that he had no prior knowledge of the alleged attempted robbery. On November 24, he was reinstated to the Tennessee football team.

After recording 37 tackles, a sack, an interception, a forced fumble, and a fumble recovery, Jackson was named to Rivals.com's 2009 SEC All-Freshman Team for his standout play.

As a sophomore in 2010, Jackson started all 12 regular season games and compiled 65 tackles, 4 tackles for loss, a sack, 9 passes defended and 5 interceptions and was named to the All-SEC second team voted by the league's coaches.

On August 24, 2011, the University of Tennessee announced that Janzen Jackson was released from the football team for unspecified reasons. On August 28, Jackson enrolled at McNeese State University, where his father, Guidry, played and coached for the McNeese State Cowboys football team.

== Professional career ==
=== 2012 NFL Combine ===
Pre-draft measurables
Height	Weight	Arm length	Hand span	40-yard dash	20-yard shuttle	Three-cone drill	Vertical jump	Broad jump	Bench press
5 ft 11 in (1.80 m)	188 lb (85 kg)	31 in (0.79 m)	9 3/8 in (0.24 m)	4.64 s	4.15 s	6.90 s	36.5 in (0.93 m)	125 ft 0 in (38.10 m)	9 reps
All values from the NFL Combine

=== New York Giants ===
On April 29, 2012, Jackson signed with the New York Giants as an undrafted free agent. On August 13, 2012, Jackson was waived by the team.

=== Toronto Argonauts ===
On February 21, 2013, Jackson signed with the Toronto Argonauts of the Canadian Football League. He was released after playing five games.

== Personal life ==
Jackson has a son named Ethan. His parents are Tesra Jackson and Lance Guidry.

In 2014, Jackson was accused of murdering his mother's boyfriend. The victim, Frank Herrera, was found in an abandoned car. His death was determined to be from strangulation. [1]

In 2017, Jackson was convicted of voluntary manslaughter of Frank Herrera and sentenced to 11 years imprisonment, the maximum sentence. Jackson's defense maintains that the killing was in self defense.
