= Darren Evans =

American football player (born 1988)

No. 32, 36
- Position: Running back

Personal information
- Born: November 9, 1988 (age 38); Indianapolis, Indiana, U.S.
- Listed height: 6 ft 0 in (1.83 m)
- Listed weight: 232 lb (105 kg)

Career information
- High school: Warren Central (Indianapolis)
- College: Virginia Tech
- NFL draft: 2011: undrafted

Career history
- Indianapolis Colts (2011); Tennessee Titans (2012)

Awards and highlights
- Second-team All-ACC (2008)
- Stats at Pro Football Reference

Darren Evans (born November 9, 1988) is an American former professional football player who was a running back in the National Football League (NFL). He was signed by the Indianapolis Colts as an undrafted free agent in 2011. He played college football for the Virginia Tech Hokies.

== Early life ==
Evans attended Warren Central High School in Indianapolis, Indiana. As a sophomore, he had 309 attempts for 2,248 yards and 27 touchdowns. As a senior, he was awarded Indiana's Mr. Football Award in 2006 (an honor given to the top high school football player in the state of Indiana) with 288 attempts 2731 yards and 61 touchdowns.

== College career ==
=== 2008 season ===
On November 6, 2008, Evans broke Mike Imoh's school single-game rushing record, rushing for 253 yards against Maryland. Evans is also the only player in school history to rush for a touchdown during each of his first six games.

Evans was named most valuable player in the 2009 Orange Bowl after gaining 153 yards on 28 carries, and scoring a game-clinching touchdown.

In 2009 summer practice, Evans tore the anterior cruciate ligament in his left knee, which forced him to miss the 2009 season.

=== College statistics ===
Year	Team	Att	Yards	Average	TDs	Receptions	Yards	TDs
2007	Virginia Tech	Redshirt						
2008	Virginia Tech	287	1,265	4.4	11	17	117	0
2009	Virginia Tech	Injured						
2010	Virginia Tech	151	854	5.7	11	9	100	0
College Totals		438	2,119	4.8	22	26	217	0

== Professional career ==
Pre-draft measurables
Height	Weight	Arm length	Hand span	40-yard dash	10-yard split	20-yard split	20-yard shuttle	Three-cone drill	Vertical jump	Broad jump	Bench press
6 ft 0 in (1.83 m)	227 lb (103 kg)	31 3/4 in (0.81 m)	9 3/4 in (0.25 m)	4.62 s	1.63 s	2.73 s	4.46 s	6.96 s	35.0 in (0.89 m)	9 ft 3 in (2.82 m)	26 reps
All values from NFL Combine

=== Indianapolis Colts ===
Evans was signed by the Indianapolis Colts as an undrafted free agent following the 2011 NFL draft on July 26, 2011. Evans was released on September 20 but added to the practice squad on the 22nd. Evans was re-signed to the active roster on October 15, 2011. He was released by Indianapolis on August 31, 2012.

=== Tennessee Titans ===
Evans was signed to the Tennessee Titans practice squad September 3, 2012. He was released on April 19, 2013.

Awards and achievements
Preceded by Mike Imoh	Virginia Tech single-game rushing record 2008–2024 (253 yards)	Succeeded by Bhayshul Tuten
