= Roc Carmichael =

American football player (born 1988)

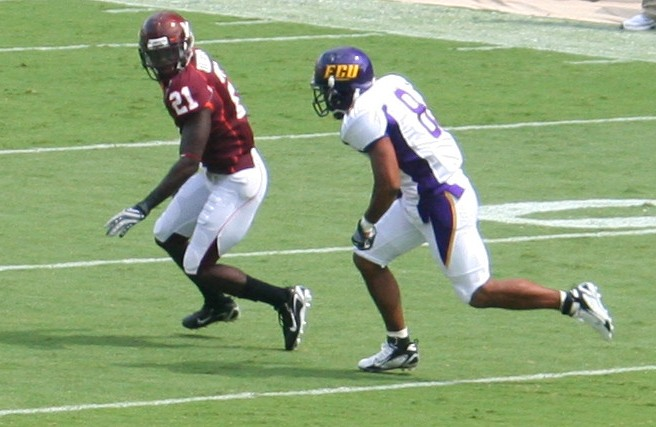
- Carmichael (left) with Virginia Tech in 2007

No. 20, 21, 4
- Position: Cornerback

Personal information
- Born: September 9, 1988 (age 38); Laurinburg, North Carolina, U.S.
- Listed height: 5 ft 10 in (1.78 m)
- Listed weight: 197 lb (89 kg)

Career information
- High school: Gwynn Park (Brandywine, Maryland)
- College: Virginia Tech
- NFL draft: 2011: 4th round, 127th overall pick

Career history
- Houston Texans (2011−2013); Philadelphia Eagles (2013−2014); Arizona Cardinals (2015)*; Winnipeg Blue Bombers (2017)
- * Offseason or practice squad member only

Career NFL statistics
- Total tackles: 25
- Pass deflections: 5
- Stats at Pro Football Reference
- Stats at CFL.ca

Rashad Bernard "Roc" Carmichael (born September 9, 1988) is an American former professional football player who was a cornerback in the National Football League (NFL) and Canadian Football League (CFL). He was selected by the Houston Texans in the fourth round of the 2011 NFL draft. He played college football for the Virginia Tech Hokies.

== Early life ==
Carmichael played high school football at Gwynn Park High School in Brandywine, Maryland.

== College career ==
During his college career at Virginia Tech, Carmichael recorded 115 tackles (75 solos), 10 interceptions, 16 pass breakups, and 26 passes defended.

== Professional career ==
Pre-draft measurables
Height	Weight	Arm length	Hand span	Wingspan	40-yard dash	10-yard split	20-yard shuttle	Three-cone drill	Vertical jump	Broad jump	Bench press
5 ft 10 in (1.78 m)	192 lb (87 kg)	31 3/4 in (0.81 m)	9 in (0.23 m)	6 ft 5 1/8 in (1.96 m)	4.76 s	1.81 s	4.06 s	6.69 s	31.0 in (0.79 m)	9 ft 8 in (2.95 m)	13 reps
All values from NFL Combine

Carmichael was selected in the fourth round as the 127th overall draft pick by the Houston Texans in the 2011 NFL draft.

Carmichael was signed off of the Texans' practice squad by the Philadelphia Eagles on September 18, 2013. He was released by the Eagles on August 30, 2014, but re-signed in November of the same year. He was again released on December 9, 2014. On May 5, 2015, he was released by the Arizona Cardinals.

On May 11, 2017, Carmichael signed with the Winnipeg Blue Bombers of the Canadian Football League. He was moved to the suspended list on September 7, 2017, and his contract expired after the season.
