= 2009 Clemson Tigers football team =

American college football season

2009 Clemson Tigers football

ACC Atlantic Division champion Music City Bowl champion

ACC Championship Game, L 34–39 vs. Georgia Tech

Music City Bowl, W 21–13 vs. Kentucky
- Conference: Atlantic Coast Conference
- Atlantic Division

Ranking
- AP: No. 24
- Record: 9–5 (6–2 ACC)
- Head coach: Dabo Swinney (1st full, 2nd overall season)
- Offensive coordinator: Billy Napier (1st season)
- Offensive scheme: Multiple
- Defensive coordinator: Kevin Steele (1st season)
- Base defense: 4–3
- Captains: Thomas Austin; Chris Chancellor; Kavell Conner; Michael Palmer; Ricky Sapp; C. J. Spiller
- Home stadium: Memorial Stadium

2009 Atlantic Coast Conference football standings
	Conf.			Overall
Team	W		L	W		L
Atlantic Division
No. 24 Clemson x	6	–	2	9	–	5
Boston College	5	–	3	8	–	5
Florida State	4	–	4	7	–	6
Wake Forest	3	–	5	5	–	7
NC State	2	–	6	5	–	7
Maryland	1	–	7	2	–	10
Coastal Division
No. 13 Georgia Tech * x$	7	–	1	11	–	3
No. 10 Virginia Tech	6	–	2	10	–	3
No. 19 Miami (FL)	5	–	3	9	–	4
North Carolina *	0	–	4	0	–	5
Duke	3	–	5	5	–	7
Virginia	2	–	6	3	–	9
Championship: Georgia Tech 39, Clemson 34
$ – BCS representative as conference champion; North Carolina vacated 8 wins, including 4 ACC wins.; Rankings from AP Poll

The 2009 Clemson Tigers football team represented Clemson University as a member of the Atlantic Coast Conference (ACC) during the 2009 NCAA Division I FBS football season. Led by Dabo Swinney in his first full season as head coach, the Tigers compiled an overall record of 9–5 with a mark of 6–2 in conference play, winning the ACC's Atlantic Division title. Clemson advanced to the ACC Championship Game, where the Tigers lost Georgia Tech. Clemson closed the season with a win over Kentucky in the Music City Bowl. The team played home games at Memorial Stadium in Clemson, South Carolina.

In the Tigers' 40–24 victory over the Florida State on November 7, running back C. J. Spiller and wide receiver Jacoby Ford became the leading all-purpose yardage duo in NCAA history, a record previously held by Marshall Faulk and Darnay Scott of San Diego State. Spiller was named as one of the three finalists for the Doak Walker Award along with Mark Ingram II of Alabama and Toby Gerhart of Stanford. On December 2, Spiller was voted the ACC's Offensive Player of the Year. He was the nation's only player i 2009 to account for touchdowns five different ways—rushing, passing, receiving, and on kick and punt returns—and had passing, rushing and receiving touchdowns in one game, a victory against NC State. He returned four kickoffs and a punt for scores in 2009, and had eight total returns for touchdowns during his career. He scored at least once in every game during the season. Spiller led the ACC with an average of nearly 184 all-purpose yards per game and was the league's fourth-leading rusher, averaging 76 yards per game.

== Schedule ==
Date	Time	Opponent	Rank	Site	TV	Result	Attendance
September 5	6:00 p.m.	Middle Tennessee*		Memorial Stadium; Clemson, SC (Hall of Fame Day, Youth Day)	ESPN360	W 37–14	78,371
September 10	7:30 p.m.	at No. 15 Georgia Tech		Bobby Dodd Stadium; Atlanta, GA (rivalry)	ESPN	L 27–30	52,029
September 19	12:00 p.m.	Boston College		Memorial Stadium; Clemson, SC (O'Rourke–McFadden Trophy, Family Weekend)	Raycom	W 25–7	77,362
September 26	3:30 p.m.	No. 15 TCU*		Memorial Stadium; Clemson, SC (Football Reunion Weekend)	ESPN360	L 10–14	71,869
October 3	12:00 p.m.	at Maryland		Byrd Stadium; College Park, MD	ESPNU	L 21–24	46,243
October 17	12:00 p.m.	Wake Forest		Memorial Stadium; Clemson, SC (IPTAY Day)	Raycom	W 38–3	74,298
October 24	3:30 p.m.	at No. 8 Miami (FL)		Land Shark Stadium; Miami Gardens, FL	ABC, ESPN	W 40–37 ^{OT}	43,778
October 31	1:30 p.m.	Coastal Carolina*^{†}		Memorial Stadium; Clemson, SC	ESPN360	W 49–3	74,429
November 7	7:45 p.m.	Florida State		Memorial Stadium; Clemson, SC (rivalry, Solid Orange Day)	ESPN	W 40–24	76,656
November 14	12:00 p.m.	at NC State	No. 24	Carter–Finley Stadium; Raleigh, NC (Textile Bowl)	Raycom	W 43–23	57,583
November 21	3:30 p.m.	Virginia	No. 18	Memorial Stadium; Clemson, SC (Military Appreciation Day)	ABC, ESPN	W 34–21	77,568
November 28	12:00 p.m.	at South Carolina*	No. 15	Williams–Brice Stadium; Columbia, SC (rivalry)	ESPN	L 17–34	80,574
December 5	8:00 p.m.	vs. No. 12 Georgia Tech*	No. 25	Raymond James Stadium; Tampa, FL (ACC Championship Game, rivalry)	ESPN	L 34–39	57,227
December 27	7:30 p.m.	vs. Kentucky*		LP Field; Nashville, TN (Music City Bowl)	ESPN	W 21–13	57,280
*Non-conference game; ^{†}Homecoming; Rankings from AP Poll released prior to the game; All times are in Eastern time

== Rankings ==
Ranking movements Legend: ██ Increase in ranking ██ Decrease in ranking — = Not ranked RV = Received votes
	Week															
Poll	Pre	1	2	3	4	5	6	7	8	9	10	11	12	13	14	Final
AP	—	—	—	RV	—	—	—	—	RV	RV	24	18	15	25	RV	24
Coaches	RV	RV	—	—	—	—	—	—	RV	RV	RV	19	16	RV	RV	RV
Harris	Not released				—	—	—	RV	RV	RV	25	19	17	RV	RV	Not released
BCS	Not released							—	—	—	—	23	18	—	—	Not released

== Game summaries ==
=== at South Carolina ===
Game Twelve– No. 18 Clemson Tigers (8-3) at South Carolina Gamecocks (6-5) – Game summary

Quarter	1	2	3	4	Total
No. 18 Clemson	7	0	0	10	17
South Carolina	14	3	7	10	34

at Williams–Brice Stadium • Columbia, South Carolina

- Date: Saturday, November 28, 2009
- Game time: 12:00 p.m. EST
- Game weather: Temperature: • Wind: • Weather: Clear
- TV announcers (ESPN): Bob Wischusen, Brian Griese

Game information

First quarter

- (14:41) CLEM – CJ Spiller 88-yard kickoff return (Richard Jackson kick) (Clemson 7-0)
- (5:21) SC – Brian Maddox 1-yard run (Spencer Lanning kick) (Drive: 7 plays, 60 yards, 3:23; Tied 7-7)
- (2:01) SC – Weslye Saunders 9-yard pass from Stephen Garcia (Spencer Lanning kick) (Drive: 2 plays, 11 yards, 0:45; South Carolina 14-7)

Second quarter

- (10:44) SC – Spencer Lanning 47-yard field goal (Drive: 11 plays, 47 yards, 4:03; South Carolina 17-7)

Third quarter

- (7:47) SC – Tori Gurley 14-yard pass from Stephen Garcia (Spencer Lanning kick) (Drive: 4 plays, 55 yards, 1:26; South Carolina 24-7)

Fourth quarter

- (11:23) CLEM – Richard Jackson 45-yard field goal (Drive: 6 plays, 41 yards, 1:52; South Carolina 24-10)
- (5:22) SC – Spencer Lanning 38-yard field goal (Drive: 11 plays, 49 yards, 6:01; South Carolina 27-10)
- (3:46) CLEM – Michael Palmer 22-yard pass from Kyle Parker (Richard Jackson kick) (Drive: 7 plays, 64 yards, 1:36; South Carolina 27-17)
- (2:40) SC – Weslye Saunders 1-yard pass from Stephen Garcia (Spencer Lanning kick) (Drive: 4 plays, 4 yards, 1:06; South Carolina 34-17)

Statistics	CLEM	SC
First downs	14	21
Total yards	61–260	80–388
Rushing yards	19–48	58–223
Passing yards	226	175
Passing: Comp–Att–Int	22–42–1	11–22–1
Time of possession	14:09	27:54

Team	Category	Player	Statistics
Clemson	Passing	Kyle Parker	22/42, 212 yards, TD, INT
Clemson	Rushing	CJ Spiller	9 carries, 18 yards
Clemson	Receiving	Michael Palmer	8 receptions, 106 yards, TD
South Carolina	Passing	Stephen Garcia	10/21, 126 yards, 3 TD, INT
South Carolina	Rushing	Kenny Miles	17 carries, 114 yards
South Carolina	Receiving	Alshon Jeffery	4 receptions, 65 yards

== Jersey numbers ==
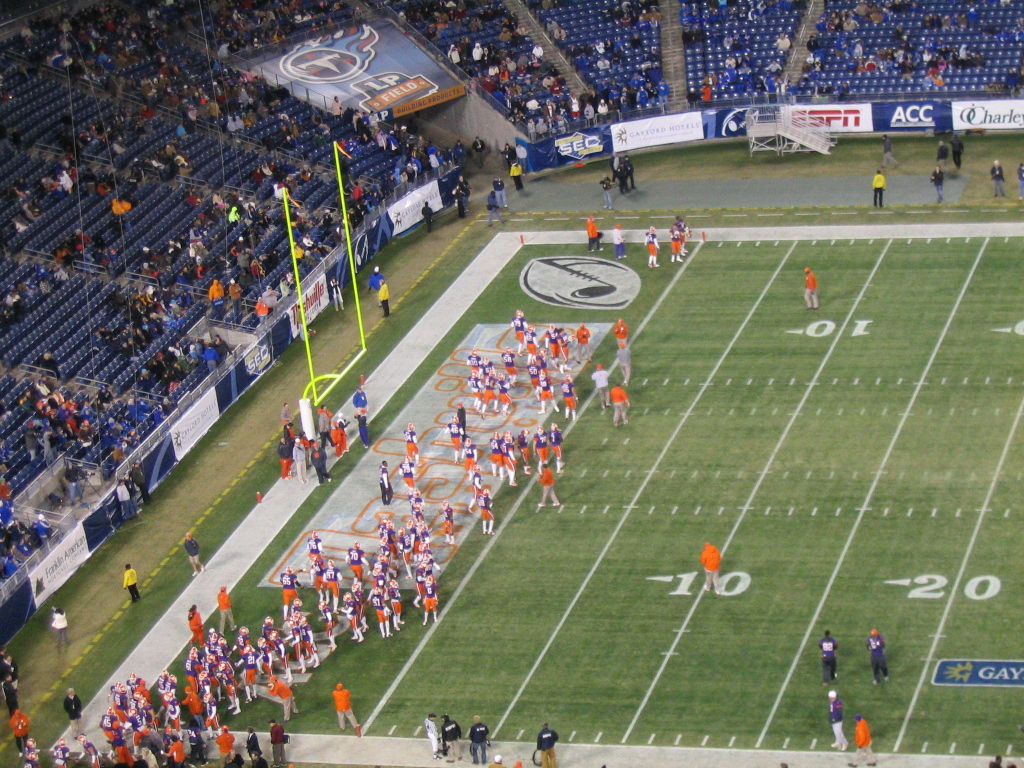
The Clemson Tigers take the field during the 2009 Music City Bowl.

=== No. 6 ===
Cornerback Chris Chancellor, whose normal number was No. 38, wore No. 6, the normal number of wide receiver Jacoby Ford, for the Miami game. Under college football rules, two or more players on a team can wear the same number as long as only one is on the field at a time. Chancellor, a native of Miami, made the change with the blessing of both Ford and Swinney in memory of his former high school teammate Jasper Howard, a cornerback who wore No. 6 for Connecticut and was murdered in the early morning of October 18 following UConn's game against Louisville.

=== No. 17 ===
On July 25, it was announced that sophomore linebacker Stanley Hunter was forced to quit playing football for medical reasons. Hunter, who led the 2008 team in fewest plays per tackle, was suffering from an increase in seizures due to epilepsy. On August 18, head coach Dabo Swinney announced that several players would alternate wearing No. 17 during the season to honor Hunter.

The following players wore No. 17 during the season:

- LB Brandon Maye
- QB Willy Korn
- FB Chad Diehl
- WR Xavier Dye
- WR Marquan Jones
- S DeAndre McDaniel
- RB Jamie Harper
- S Sadat Chambers
- S Rashard Hall
- CB Crezdon Butler
- LB Kavell Conner
- WR Jacoby Ford

Three of the players who wore No. 17 (Korn, Diehl, and Dye) were also teammates with Hunter at James F. Byrnes High School in Spartanburg, South Carolina. Hunter remained a member of the Clemson team, serving as a student-coach the Tigers.

=== No. 28 ===
At the end of the season, Swinney announced that Clemson would retire the No. 28 jersey worn by C. J. Spiller at a ceremony when the Tigers play Maryland at home on October 16, 2010.

== Personnel ==
=== Coaching staff ===
- Dabo Swinney – Head coach
- Billy Napier – Offensive coordinator/quarterbacks
- Kevin Steele – Defensive coordinator/inside linebackers
- Charlie Harbison – Co-defensive Coordinator/defensive backs
- Danny Pearman – Assistant head coach/Tackles & Tight Ends
- Brad Scott – Associate head coach/Offensive Guards and Centers
- Dan Brooks – Defensive tackles
- Andre Powell – Running backs/special teams
- Chris Rumph – Defensive ends
- Jeff Scott – Recruiting coordinator/wide receivers

=== Depth chart ===
These are the starters, primary backups, and key reserves as of September 2009.

Defense

FS
Marcus Gilchrist
Rashard Hall

WLB	MLB	SLB
⋅	Brandon Maye	⋅
Jonathan Willard	Jeremy Campbell	⋅

Cat
DeAndre McDaniel
Jonathan Meeks

CB
Crezdon Butler
Byron Maxwell

DE	DT	DT	DE
Da'Quan Bowers	Jarvis Jenkins	Brandon Thompson	Ricky Sapp
Malliciah Goodman	Miguel Chavis	Jamie Cumbie	Kevin Alexander

CB
Chris Chancellor
Coty Sensabaugh

Offense

WR
Jacoby Ford
Marquan Jones

LT	LG	C	RG	RT
Chris Hairston	Thomas Austin	Dalton Freeman	Antoine McClain	Landon Walker
Cory Lambert	Matt Saunders	Mason Cloy	Wilson Norris	David Smith

TE
Michael Palmer
Dwayne Allen

WR
Xavier Dye
Brandon Clear

QB
Kyle Parker
Willy Korn

Key reserves
RB Andre Ellington
WR Terrance Ashe
WR Jaron Brown
DE Andre Branch
FS Sadat Chambers
DB Xavier Brewer
DT Rennie Moore
TE Durrell Barry

RB
C. J. Spiller
Jamie Harper

FB
Rendrick Taylor
Chad Diehl

Special teams
PK Richard Jackson
PK Spencer Benton
P Dawson Zimmerman
P Richard Jackson
KR C. J. Spiller
PR Jacoby Ford
LS Matt Skinner
H Michael Wade

=== Recruiting class ===
- Malliciah Goodman (DE; Florence, South Carolina; West Florence HS)
- J. K. Jay (OL; Greenville, South Carolina; Christ Church Episcopal School)
- Jonathan Meeks (S; Rock Hill, South Carolina; Rock Hill HS)
- Tyler Shatley (FB; Valdese, North Carolina; East Burke HS)
- Brandon Thomas (OL; Spartanburg, South Carolina; Dorman HS)
- Bryce McNeal (WR; Minneapolis, Minnesota; Breck HS)
- Roderick McDowell (RB; Sumter, South Carolina; Sumter HS)
- Tajh Boyd (QB; Hampton, Virginia; Phoebus HS)
- Spencer Shuey (LB/DE; Charlotte, North Carolina; South Mecklenburg HS)
- Quandon Christian (LB; Lake View, South Carolina; Lake View HS)
- Corico Hawkins (LB; Milledgeville, Georgia; Baldwin HS)
- Darell Smith (TE/BAN; Gadsden, Alabama; Gadsden City HS)
- Taylor Ogle (QB; Gatlinburg, Tennessee; Gatlinburg-Pittman HS)
- Octavius Lewis(SS;Orlando, FL Maynard Evans HS)

== 2010 NFL draft ==
Clemson had five players selected in the 2010 NFL draft. C. J. Spiller went in the first round as the ninth overall pick.

Player	Team	Round	Pick #	Position
C. J. Spiller	Buffalo Bills	1st	9th	RB
Jacoby Ford	Oakland Raiders	4th	108th	WR
Ricky Sapp	Philadelphia Eagles	5th	143rd	DE
Crezdon Butler	Pittsburgh Steelers	5th	164th	DB
Kavell Conner	Indianapolis Colts	7th	240th	LB
