= 2009 Kentucky Wildcats football team =

American college football season

2009 Kentucky Wildcats football

Music City Bowl, L 13–21 vs. Clemson
- Conference: Southeastern Conference
- Eastern Division
- Record: 7–6 (3–5 SEC)
- Head coach: Rich Brooks (7th season)
- Offensive coordinator: Joker Phillips (5th season)
- Offensive scheme: Pro-style
- Defensive coordinator: Steve Brown (3rd season)
- Base defense: 4–3
- Home stadium: Commonwealth Stadium

2009 Southeastern Conference football standings
| | Conf. | | | Overall |
| Team | W | | L | W | | L |
|---|---|---|---|---|---|---|
Eastern Division
| No. 3 Florida x% | 8 | – | 0 | 13 | – | 1 |
| Georgia | 4 | – | 4 | 8 | – | 5 |
| Tennessee | 4 | – | 4 | 7 | – | 6 |
| Kentucky | 3 | – | 5 | 7 | – | 6 |
| South Carolina | 3 | – | 5 | 7 | – | 6 |
| Vanderbilt | 0 | – | 8 | 2 | – | 10 |
Western Division
| No. 1 Alabama x$# | 8 | – | 0 | 14 | – | 0 |
| No. 17 LSU | 5 | – | 3 | 9 | – | 4 |
| No. 20 Ole Miss | 4 | – | 4 | 9 | – | 4 |
| Arkansas | 3 | – | 5 | 8 | – | 5 |
| Auburn | 3 | – | 5 | 8 | – | 5 |
| Mississippi State | 3 | – | 5 | 5 | – | 7 |
Championship: Alabama 32, Florida 13
# – BCS National Champion; $ – BCS representative as conference champion; % – BCS at-large representative; x – Division champion/co-champions; Rankings from AP Poll

The 2009 Kentucky Wildcats football team represented the University of Kentucky during the 2009 NCAA Division I FBS football season. The team was coached by Rich Brooks, in his seventh and ultimately final season at Kentucky, and played its home games at Commonwealth Stadium. The Wildcats competed in the Southeastern Conference in its eastern division. They finished the season with a record of 7–6 and 3–5 in conference play, and were defeated by Clemson 21–13 in the Music City Bowl.

Several days after the Cats' bowl appearance, Brooks retired from coaching. He was immediately replaced by offensive coordinator Joker Phillips, who had agreed in 2008 to be Brooks' designated successor.

== Preseason and postseason awards ==
=== PFW All-American ===
2009 Pro Football Weekly All-American First Team

| # | Name | Height | Weight (lbs.) | Position | Class | Hometown |
|---|---|---|---|---|---|---|
| 38 | John Conner | 5'11" | 240 | Fullback | Sr. | Cincinnati, OH, U.S. |

=== AP All-SEC ===
2009 AP All-SEC First Team

| # | Name | Height | Weight (lbs.) | Position | Class | Hometown |
|---|---|---|---|---|---|---|
| 18 | Randall Cobb | 5'11" | 190 | All-purpose | So. | Alcoa, TN, U.S. |

2009 AP All-SEC Second Team

| # | Name | Height | Weight (lbs.) | Position | Class | Hometown |
|---|---|---|---|---|---|---|
| 20 | Derrick Locke | 5'9" | 180 | RB | Jr. | Hugo, OK, U.S. |
| 50 | Sam Maxwell | 6'3" | 244 | LB | Sr. | Hartwell, GA, U.S. |
| 91 | Corey Peters | 6'3" | 295 | DT | Sr. | Louisville, KY, U.S. |

=== Preseason SEC picks ===
Coaches: 6th (East)
AP: 6th (East)

=== Preseason polls ===
USA Today/Coaches: 42nd

=== Preseason All-SEC ===
2009 All-SEC First Team

- Trevard Lindley, DB

2009 All-SEC Second Team

- Micah Johnson, LB

2009 All-SEC Third Team

- Zipp Duncan, OT
- Jorge Gonzalez, C
- Mike Hartline, QB
- Corey Peters, DT

=== Current depth chart ===
As of November 18, 2009

Offense

WR
8 Chris Matthews (Jr.)
16 LaRod King (Fr.)
81 Kyrus Lanxter (Jr.)

| LT | LG | C | RG | RT |
|---|---|---|---|---|
| 72 Zipp Duncan (Sr.) | 70 Stuart Hines (So.) | 61 Jorge Gonzalez (Sr.) | 78 Christian Johnson (Sr.) | 76 Justin Jeffries (Sr.) |
| 52 Billy Joe Murphy (So.) | 67 Larry Warford (Fr.) | 69 Matt Smith (Fr.) | 63 Jake Lanefski (So.) | 75 Brad Durham (Jr.) |
| 74 Trevino Woods (Fr.) | 64 Osaze Idumwonyi (Fr.) | 56 Sam Simpson (Fr.) | 58 Sean Stackhouse (Fr.) | 59 Dave Ulinski (Fr.) |

TE
86 Ross Bogue (Sr.)
80 TC Drake (Sr.)
40 Maurice Grinter (Sr.)

WR
18 Randall Cobb (So.)
85 Gene McCaskill (So.)
13 Eric Adeyemi (So.)

QB
12 Morgan Newton (Fr.)
1 Will Fidler (Jr.)
7 Ryan Mossakowski (Fr.)

FB
38 John Conner (Sr.)
47 AJ Nance (Sr.)

FB
20 Derrick Locke (Jr.)
29 Alphonso Smith (Sr.)
30 Moncell Allen (Jr.)

Defense

CB
34 Paul Warford (Jr.)
15 Martavius Neloms (Fr.)
35 Cartier Rice (Fr.)

FS
33 Calvin Harrison (Sr.)
10 Matt Lentz (So.)
11 Greg Wilson (So.)

| DE | NT | DT | DE |
|---|---|---|---|
| 94 Taylor Wyndham (Fr.) | 91 Corey Peters (Sr.) | 53 Ricky Lumpkin (Jr.) | 55 DeQuin Evans (So.) |
| 66 Chandler Burden (So.) | 60 Shane McCord (Jr.) | 98 Mark Crawford (Jr.) | 96 Collins Ukwu (Fr.) |
| 95 Patrick Ligon (Fr.) | 97 Mister Cobble (Fr.) | 68 Luke McDermott (So.) | 62 Greg Meisner (So.) |

| Sam LB | Middle LB | Will LB |
|---|---|---|
| 50 Sam Maxwell (Sr.) | 4 Micah Johnson (Sr.) | 22 Danny Trevathan (So.) |
| 57 Jacob Dufrene (So.) | 46 Ronnie Sneed (So.) | 47 William Johnson (Fr.) |
| 48 Ridge Wilson (Fr.) | 43 Mikhail Mabry (Sr.) | 54 Brandon Thurmond (Jr.) |

CB
24 Randall Burden (So.)
6 Taiedo Smith (So.)
14 Anthony Mosley (So.)

SS
21 Winston Guy (So.)
27 Ashton Cobb (Sr.)

Special teams
| K 88 Joseph Mansour (Fr.) |
| P 9 Ryan Tydlacka (So.) |
| LS Brad Hart (Jr.) |
| KR 29 Alphonso Smith (Sr.) 20 Derrick Locke (Jr.) |
| PR 18 Randall Cobb (So.) |

== Schedule ==
| Date | Time | Opponent | Site | TV | Result | Attendance |
|---|---|---|---|---|---|---|
| September 5 | 12:00 pm | vs. Miami (OH)* | Paul Brown Stadium; Cincinnati, OH | ESPNU | W 42–0 | 41,037 |
| September 19 | 12:00 pm | Louisville* | Commonwealth Stadium; Lexington, KY (Battle for the Governor's Cup) | ESPNU | W 31–27 | 66,988 |
| September 26 | 6:00 pm | No. 1 Florida | Commonwealth Stadium; Lexington, KY (rivalry) | ESPN2 | L 7–41 | 64,011 |
| October 3 | 12:21 pm | No. 3 Alabama | Commonwealth Stadium; Lexington, KY | SECN | L 20–38 | 70,967 |
| October 10 | 12:30 pm | at No. 25 South Carolina | Williams-Brice Stadium; Columbia, SC | SECRN | L 26–28 | 65,278 |
| October 17 | 7:30 pm | at Auburn | Jordan–Hare Stadium; Auburn, AL | ESPNU | W 21–14 | 86,217 |
| October 24 | 7:00 pm | Louisiana–Monroe* | Commonwealth Stadium; Lexington, KY (Military Appreciation Day) | SECRN | W 36–13 | 61,203 |
| October 31 | 7:00 pm | Mississippi State^{†} | Commonwealth Stadium; Lexington, KY | SECRN | L 24–31 | 64,953 |
| November 7 | 1:00 pm | Eastern Kentucky* | Commonwealth Stadium; Lexington, KY | BBSN | W 37–12 | 60,053 |
| November 14 | 12:21 pm | at Vanderbilt | Vanderbilt Stadium; Nashville, TN (rivalry) | SECN | W 24–13 | 33,675 |
| November 21 | 7:45 pm | at Georgia | Sanford Stadium; Athens, GA | ESPN2 | W 34–27 | 92,746 |
| November 28 | 7:00 pm | Tennessee | Commonwealth Stadium; Lexington, KY (Battle for the Barrel/Senior Day) | ESPNU | L 24–30 ^{OT} | 70,981 |
| December 27 | 8:15 pm | vs. Clemson* | LP Field; Nashville, TN (Music City Bowl) | ESPN | L 13–21 | 57,280 |
*Non-conference game; ^{†}Homecoming; Rankings from Coaches' Poll released prior to the game; All times are in Eastern time

== Game summaries ==
=== Miami (Ohio) ===
| | 1 | 2 | 3 | 4 | Total |
|---|---|---|---|---|---|
| Wildcats | 0 | 21 | 14 | 7 | 42 |
| RedHawks | 0 | 0 | 0 | 0 | 0 |

Randall Cobb scored a touchdown early in the second quarter

Mike Hartline threw two touchdowns to receiver Randall Cobb and led Kentucky to a 42–0 victory. Hartline had a great first game of the season, throwing 18 of 27 for 222 yards. Cobb caught a 27-yard pass for Kentucky's first touchdown. He also took a direct snap from center and ran 11 yards for a third-quarter touchdown. The versatile sophomore had seven catches for 96 yards. Kentucky's defense also performed very well, picking off Miami twice and holding the Redhawks to under 200 yards of total offense. All-American cornerback Trevard Lindley intercepted a pass in the 3rd quarter and returned it for a 25-yard touchdown. That was Lindley's tenth career interception and his second returned for a touchdown. The pass intercepted was in the second quarter by senior safety Calvin Harrison. Another star of the game was the debut of junior receiver Chris Matthews. Matthews caught a touchdown pass from Hartline late in the 2nd quarter. This was Kentucky's first shut out since 1996 when they shut out Vanderbilt.

Week 1 SEC Defensive Player of the Week: Trevard Lindley was named SEC defensive player of the week after intercepting a pass, scoring a touchdown, and breaking up three passes.

=== Louisville ===
| | 1 | 2 | 3 | 4 | Total |
|---|---|---|---|---|---|
| Cardinals | 7 | 0 | 6 | 14 | 27 |
| Wildcats | 10 | 7 | 0 | 14 | 31 |

Kentucky wins the 2009 Governor's Cup trophy for the third straight year

For the third straight season the Kentucky Wildcats defeated the Louisville Cardinals and won the Governor's Cup. This is Kentucky's longest streak since the rivalry was renewed in 1994. Derrick Locke returned a kickoff 100 yards for a touchdown and ran for another. A fumbled kickoff return set up Kentucky's final score late in the 4th quarter, a 12-yard pass from Mike Hartline to a leaping Randall Cobb—his former rival for the starting quarterback job. Prior to that, Louisville (1–1) had taken the lead by forcing three consecutive Wildcats turnovers.

This back-and-forth battle for the Governor's Cup wasn't won until the final 2 minutes when Louisville quarterback Justin Burke was driving for a potential game-winning score, only to have a pass tipped by Corey Peters and picked off by Sam Maxwell. Kentucky had to punt the ball back to Louisville, but Burke's last-second Hail Mary was incomplete.

For the 9th straight season, the team that rushes for the most yards went on to win the game. Kentucky out gained Louisville running for 168 yards to 133 yards.

Week 3 SEC Special Teams Player of the Week: Derrick Locke was named SEC special teams player of the week after returning a kickoff in the first quarter 100 yards for a touchdown.

=== Florida ===
| | 1 | 2 | 3 | 4 | Total |
|---|---|---|---|---|---|
| Gators | 31 | 0 | 3 | 7 | 41 |
| Wildcats | 0 | 7 | 0 | 0 | 7 |

=== Alabama ===
| | 1 | 2 | 3 | 4 | Total |
|---|---|---|---|---|---|
| Crimson Tide | 7 | 14 | 17 | 0 | 38 |
| Wildcats | 6 | 0 | 7 | 7 | 20 |

=== South Carolina ===
| | 1 | 2 | 3 | 4 | Total |
|---|---|---|---|---|---|
| Wildcats | 3 | 14 | 3 | 6 | 26 |
| Gamecocks | 7 | 7 | 7 | 7 | 28 |

=== Auburn ===
| | 1 | 2 | 3 | 4 | Total |
|---|---|---|---|---|---|
| Wildcats | 0 | 7 | 0 | 14 | 21 |
| Tigers | 7 | 7 | 0 | 0 | 14 |

=== Louisiana-Monroe ===
| | 1 | 2 | 3 | 4 | Total |
|---|---|---|---|---|---|
| War Hawks | 0 | 7 | 6 | 0 | 13 |
| Wildcats | 14 | 14 | 0 | 8 | 36 |

=== Mississippi State ===
| | 1 | 2 | 3 | 4 | Total |
|---|---|---|---|---|---|
| Bulldogs | 3 | 7 | 21 | 0 | 31 |
| Wildcats | 7 | 10 | 7 | 0 | 24 |

=== Eastern Kentucky ===
| | 1 | 2 | 3 | 4 | Total |
|---|---|---|---|---|---|
| Colonels | 0 | 6 | 0 | 6 | 12 |
| Wildcats | 7 | 10 | 13 | 7 | 37 |

=== Vanderbilt ===
| | 1 | 2 | 3 | 4 | Total |
|---|---|---|---|---|---|
| Wildcats | 7 | 3 | 7 | 7 | 24 |
| Commodores | 3 | 10 | 0 | 0 | 13 |

=== Georgia ===
| | 1 | 2 | 3 | 4 | Total |
|---|---|---|---|---|---|
| Wildcats (7–4, 3–4) | 6 | 0 | 14 | 14 | 34 |
| Bulldogs (6–5, 4–4) | 3 | 17 | 7 | 0 | 27 |

Kentucky entered the game not having won at Georgia since 1977. Kentucky jumped out to a 6–0 lead on a 20-yard touchdown pass from Morgan Newton to Derrick Locke (the conversion failed) but Georgia held a 20–6 lead at halftime.

In the third quarter, Randall Cobb scored on a 12-yard touchdown run and LaRod King caught a 21-yard touchdown pass from Newton to draw Kentucky to within 27–20. Kentucky shut out Georgia in the fourth quarter and scored two touchdowns on Derrick Locke's 60-yard pass reception from Newton and Cobb's 1-yard run to give Kentucky the 34–27 win. Newton finished with 137 yards and 3 touchdowns passing, completing 9 of 17 attempts. Locke had 80 yards rushing and 2 receptions for 80 yards and two touchdowns. Cobb had 40 yards and 2 touchdowns rushing and one reception for 19 yards.

The Kentucky defense played a huge role in securing the victory late in the game. Kentucky defensive lineman Shane McCord intercepted a Georgia pass with just under ten minutes remaining in the game. With five and a half minutes left in the game a Georgia quarterback and running back fumbled an exchange at the Kentucky 2-yard line and Kentucky linebacker Danny Trevathan recovered. Kentucky had to punt but linebacker Sam Maxwell intercepted a Georgia pass with 1:45 remaining to seal the win.

=== Tennessee ===
| | 1 | 2 | 3 | 4 | OT | Total |
|---|---|---|---|---|---|---|
| Volunteers | 7 | 7 | 10 | 0 | 6 | 30 |
| Wildcats | 14 | 7 | 0 | 3 | 0 | 24 |

== Roster ==
=== Roster ===
2010 roster alphabetical

Ht. Wt. Cl.-Exp. Hometown/High School/Last College

87 Adams, Brian Wide Receiver 6-4 232 FR-RS Gainesville, Ga./South Forsyth

60 Agomuo, Chris Linebacker 6-2 197 SO-SQ Mason, Ohio/Mason

30 Allen, Moncell Tailback 5-7 232 SR-3L New Orleans, La./Providence Day/Fork Union Military Academy

86 Aumiller, Jordan Tight End 6-4 230 FR-RS Danville, Ky./Boyle County

41 Bailey, Mychal Defensive Back 6-0 185 JR-JC LaGrange, Ga./LaGrange/Southwest Mississippi CC

31 Benton, Mikie Cornerback 5-11 190 SO-SQ Russellville, Ky./Russellville

34 Berry, Ed Wide Receiver 6-0 155 FR-RS Eminence, Ky./Eminence

27 Boyd, Aaron Wide Receiver 6-4 212 SO-1L Lexington, Ky./Henry Clay

10 Brause, Tyler Quarterback 6-4 220 FR-HS Sycamore, Ohio/Wynford

88 Brazley, Nik Wide Receiver 5-9 162 JR-SQ Louisville, Ky./Male

66 Burden, Chandler Offensive tackle 6-4 291 JR-2L Blue Ash, Ohio/La Salle

24 Burden, Randall Cornerback 6-0 175 JR-2L LaGrange, Ga./LaGrange

18 Cobb, Randall Wide Receiver/Quarterback 5-11 186 JR-2L Alcoa, Tenn./Alcoa

97 Cobble, Mister Defensive tackle 6-0 321 FR-RS Louisville, Ky./Central

84 Correll, Gabe Tight End 6-5 231 SO-SQ Cincinnati, Ohio/Anderson/Fork Union Military Academy

98 Crawford, Mark Defensive tackle 6-1 293 JR-1L Indianapolis, Ind./Ben Davis/Coffeyville CC

62 Davenport, Tyler Offensive line 6-5 309 FR-HS Hodgenville, Ky./LaRue County

61 Davis, Alvin Defensive line 6-4 228 FR-HS Jesup, Ga./Wayne County

77 Davis, Marcus Center 6-1 283 SR-2L Union, Ky./Boone County

60 Delic, Nermin Defensive line 6-5 259 FR-HS Dalton, Ga./Northwest Whitfield

50 Douglas, Mike Defensive end 6-4 225 FR-HS Largo, Fla./Largo

73 Duff, Stephen Offensive tackle 6-0 301 FR-RS Louisville, Ky./Pleasure Ridge Park

57 Dufrene, Jacob Linebacker 6-1 211 SR-3L Cut Off, La./John Curtis Christian

75 Durham, Brad Offensive tackle 6-4 321 SR-3L Mt. Vernon, Ky./Rockcastle County

48 Dutton, Alex Wide Receiver 5-10 170 SO-SQ Louisville, Ky./Trinity

49 Dutton, Nathan Wide Receiver 5-10 169 SO-SQ Louisville, Ky./Trinity

76 Eatmon-Nared, Tevan Offensive line 6-7 280 FR-HS Bucyrus, Ohio/Wynford

55 Evans, DeQuin Defensive end 6-3 256 SR-1L Long Beach, Calif./Cabrillo/Los Angeles Harbor College

1 Fiddler, Will Quarterback 6-4 229 JR Henderson Co, KY

19 Fields, E.J. Wide Receiver 6-1 198 SO-SQ Frankfort, Ky./Frankfort

29 Gainer, Brandon Running back 5-11 200 FR-HS Miami, Fla./Central

25 George, Jonathan Tailback 5-10 204 FR-RS Lincoln, Ala./Lincoln

33 Gibbs, Josh Strong Safety 5-10 210 JR-JC Long Beach, Calif./Valencia/College of the Canyons

45 Glenn, Antwane Defensive tackle 6-3 260 JR-SQ Pacolet, S.C./Broome

64 Godby, Max Offensive line 6-4 267 FR-HS Louisville, Ky./Christian Academy of Louisville

21 Guy Jr., Winston Free Safety 6-1 215 JR-2L Lexington, Ky./Lexington Catholic

31 Harper, Michael Wide Receiver 6-1 182 SR-SQ Stone Mountain, Ga./Stephenson/Howard

5 Hartline, Mike Quarterback 6-6 210 SR-3L Canton, Ohio/GlenOak

65 Helton, J.J. Long Snapper 6-3 225 SR-3L Franklin, Tenn./Franklin

90 Henderson, Justin Defensive end 6-3 236 FR-HS Bamberg, S.C./Bamberg-Ehrhardt

70 Hines, Stuart Offensive Guard 6-4 291 JR-2L Bowling Green, Ky./Bowling Green

83 Holloway, Spencer Defensive line 6-3 250 FR-HS Louisville, Ky./Trinity

37 Hudnell, Christian Cornerback 6-0 202 FR-RS Cameron Park, Calif./Jesuit

2 Huzzie, Qua Linebacker 5-10 210 FR-RS LaGrange, Ga./LaGrange

51 Johnson, Tristian Defensive end 6-1 259 FR-RS LaGrange, Ga./LaGrange

13 Jones, E.J. Wide Receiver 5-9 160 SR-SQ Miami, Fla./Northwestern/Marian College/Pasadena City College

36 Joseph, Andrew Fullback 5-10 226 FR-RS Marietta, Ga./Pope/Naval Academy Prep School

82 Kendrick, Anthony Tight End 6-3 252 FR-RS Katy, Texas/Seven Lakes

16 King, La'Rod Wide Receiver 6-4 204 SO-1L Radcliff, Ky./North Hardin

63 Lanefski, Jake Offensive Guard/Center 6-4 292 JR-2L Mobile, Ala./McGill-Toolen Catholic

91 Laughlin, Brice Defensive line 6-3 280 FR-HS Summerville, S.C./Summerville

78 Lewellen, Jacob Defensive end 6-3 244 SO-SQ Louisville, Ky./Manual

45 Lewis, Tatum Fullback 6-0 245 SO-SQ Winchester, Ky./George Rogers Clark

95 Ligon, Patrick Defensive end 6-4 238 FR-RS Germantown, Tenn./Christian Brothers

20 Locke, Derrick Tailback 5-9 190 SR-3L Hugo, Okla./Hugo

53 Lumpkin, Ricky Defensive tackle 6-4 306 SR-3L Clarksville, Tenn./Kenwood

88 Mansour, Joe Kicker/Punter 6-2 181 FR-HS LaGrange, Ga./LaGrange

8 Matthews, Chris Wide Receiver 6-5 219 SR-1L Los Angeles, Calif./Dorsey/Los Angeles Harbor College

47 McCaden, Tevin Running back 5-8 200 FR-HS Lexington, Ky./Bryan Station

13 McCaskill, Gene Wide Receiver 6-0 192 JR-2L Chester, S.C./Chester

92 McCord, Shane Defensive tackle 6-2 291 SR-3L Hartwell, Ga./Hart County

68 McDermott, Luke Defensive tackle 6-1 265 JR-SQ Louisville, Ky./Trinity

54 McDuffen, Malcolm Linebacker 6-3 205 FR-HS Hopkinsville, Ky./Christian County

93 McIntosh, Craig Kicker 6-0 199 SO-1L Lexington, Ky./Lexington Christian

37 Meisner, Greg Fullback 6-1 236 JR-1L Greensburg, Pa./Hempfield Area

42 Melillo, Nick Tight End 6-2 242 JR-1L Louisville, Ky./Trinity/Lindenwood

71 Mingey, Burt Offensive line 6-7 330 FR-HS Lexington, Ky./Lafayette

79 Mitchell, Kevin Offensive Guard 6-6 326 FR-RS Winston, Ga./Alexander

44 Mosby, Ryan Linebacker 5-11 206 FR-RS Heath, Texas/Rockwall-Heath

14 Mosley, Anthony Cornerback 6-0 169 JR-1L Ellenwood, Ga./Tucker

7 Mossakowski, Ryan Quarterback 6-4 224 FR-RS Frisco, Texas/Centennial

52 Murphy, Billy Joe Offensive tackle 6-6 294 JR-2L Gamaliel, Ky./Monroe County

41 Murphy, Brian Fullback 6-0 220 JR-SQ Big Stone Gap, Va./Powell Valley

15 Neloms, Martavius Cornerback 6-1 184 SO-1L Memphis, Tenn./Fairley

12 Newton, Morgan Quarterback 6-4 235 SO-1L Carmel, Ind./Carmel

78 Noltemeyer, David Offensive line 6-4 275 FR-HS Louisville, Ky./St. Xavier

Patterson, Tim Linebacker 6-4 220 FR-HS Louisville, Ky./Central

14 Phillippi, Ryan Quarterback 5-11 178 RS FR-SQ Lexington, Ky./Henry Clay

93 Porter, Elliott Defensive tackle 6-3 290 FR-HS Waggaman, La./Archbishop Shaw

1 Priester, Jerell Cornerback 5-9 170 FR-HS Ulmer, S.C./Allendale-Fairfax

39 Ratliff, Jewell Linebacker 6-1 230 FR-HS New Orleans, La./McDonogh 35

35 Rice, Cartier Cornerback 5-10 182 SO-1L Duncan, S.C./Byrnes

3 Roark, Matt Wide Receiver 6-5 209 JR-2L Acworth, Ga./North Cobb

89 Robinson, Tyler Tight End 6-3 243 FR-HS Friendsville, Tenn./Alcoa

99 Rumph, Donte Defensive line 6-3 265 FR-HS St. Matthews, S.C./Calhoun County/Fork Union Military Academy

23 Russell, Donald Tailback 5-11 209 SO-1L West Palm Beach, Fla./Dwyer

4 Sanders, Raymond Running back 5-8 185 FR-HS Stone Mountain, Ga./Stephenson

15 Sargent, Tyler Quarterback 6-4 217 JR-SQ Waynesville, Ohio/Clinton Massie

80 Shields, Ronnie Tight End 6-5 220 FR-HS Stone Mountain, Ga./Stephenson

38 Simmons, Eric Defensive Back 6-0 180 FR-HS Atlanta, Ga./Westlake

90 Simmons, Pat Kicker 6-2 204 SO-SQ LaGrange, Ga./LaGrange

32 Simpson, Miles Running back 6-2 210 FR-HS Independence, Ky./Simon Kenton

56 Simpson, Sam Center 6-4 275 FR-RS Lexington, Ky./Henry Clay

85 Smith, Alex Tight End 6-5 251 FR-HS Cincinnati, Ohio/Lakota West

69 Smith, Matt Center 6-4 288 SO-1L Louisville, Ky./St. Xavier

6 Smith, Taiedo Free Safety 6-0 188 JR-2L Dunnellon, Fla./Dunnellon

46 Sneed, Ronnie Linebacker 6-2 233 JR-2L Tallahassee, Fla./Florida

58 Stackhouse, Sean Offensive Guard 6-4 265 SO-SQ Jacksonville, Fla./Mandarin

49 Thomas, Antonio Linebacker 6-1 236 JR-SQ Cowpens, S.C./Broome

59 Thomas, Jon Long Snapper 5-11 231 JR-SQ Louisville, Ky./St. Xavier

22 Trevathan, Danny Linebacker 6-1 223 JR-2L Leesburg, Fla./Leesburg

34 Trimble, Dale Defensive Back 5-10 175 FR-HS Gadsden, Ala./Gadsden City

9 Tydlacka, Ryan Punter/Kicker 6-1 201 JR-2L Louisville, Ky./Trinity

28 Tyler, Dakotah Free Safety 5-11 207 FR-RS Indianapolis, Ind./Pike

96 Ukwu, Collins Defensive end 6-5 249 SO-1L La Vergne, Tenn./La Vergne

59 Ulinski, Dave Offensive Guard 6-5 321 SO-1L Louisville, Ky./duPont Manual

17 Walker, Jarvis Free Safety 6-1 208 FR-RS Marrero, La./Archbishop Rummel

72 Wallace, Ryan Offensive tackle 6-5 250 SO-TR Bowling Green, Ky./Bowling Green/Colorado

67 Warford, Larry Offensive Guard 6-3 329 SO-1L Richmond, Ky./Madison Central

26 Williams, CoShik Tailback 5-9 180 SO-1L Hiram, Ga./Hiram

40 Williamson, Avery Linebacker 6-1 221 FR-HS Milan, Tenn./Milan

11 Wilson, Greg Linebacker 6-1 218 JR-2L College Park, Ga./North Clayton

48 Wilson, Ridge Linebacker 6-3 240 SO-1L Louisville, Ky./Central

74 Woods, Trevino Offensive tackle 6-5 290 SO-SQ Athens, Ga./Clarke Central

94 Wyndham, Taylor Defensive end 6-4 238 SO-1L Swansea, S.C./Swansea

== Statistics ==
=== Team ===
| | UK | Opp |
|---|---|---|
| Scoring | 183 | 161 |
| Points per game | 26.1 | 23.0 |
| First downs | 134 | 130 |
| Rushing | 75 | 64 |
| Passing | 52 | 58 |
| Penalty | 7 | 8 |
| Total offense | 2361 | 2466 |
| Avg per play | 5.0 | 5.2 |
| Avg per game | 337.3 | 352.3 |
| Fumbles-Lost | 9-4 | 6-3 |
| Penalties-Yards | 37-333 | 44-349 |
| Avg per game | 47.6 | 49.9 |

| | UK | Opp |
|---|---|---|
| Punts-Yards | 35-1343 | 37-1390 |
| Avg Net Punt | 38.4 | 37.6 |
| Time of possession/Game | 29:34 | 30:26 |
| 3rd down conversions | 39/102 | 47/109 |
| 4th down conversions | 10/13 | 6/12 |
| Touchdowns scored | 24 | 21 |
| Field goals-Attempts | 5-8 | 5-8 |
| PAT-Attempts | 22-23 | 20-21 |
| Attendance | 281,169 | 154,495 |
| Games/Avg per Game | 4/70,292 | 2/77,248 |
| Neutral Site Games | 0 | 1/41037 |

==== Scores by quarter ====
| | 1 | 2 | 3 | 4 | Total |
|---|---|---|---|---|---|
| Kentucky | 33 | 70 | 24 | 56 | 183 |
| Opponents | 59 | 35 | 39 | 28 | 161 |

=== Offense ===
==== Rushing ====
| Name | GP-GS | Att | Gain | Loss | Net | Avg | TD | Long | Avg/G |
|---|---|---|---|---|---|---|---|---|---|
| Derrick Locke | 7-5 | 109 | 523 | 28 | 495 | 4.5 | 3 | 31 | 70.7 |
| Randall Cobb | 7-0 | 35 | 283 | 3 | 280 | 8.0 | 4 | 61 | 40.0 |
| Alfonso Smith | 7-2 | 35 | 165 | 10 | 155 | 4.4 | 1 | 16 | 22.1 |
| Moncell Allen | 7-0 | 19 | 104 | 1 | 103 | 5.4 | 1 | 20 | 14.6 |
| John Conner | 6-0 | 18 | 100 | 0 | 100 | 5.6 | 2 | 39 | 16.7 |
| CoShik Williams | 3-0 | 12 | 52 | 0 | 46 | 4.3 | 0 | 8 | 17.3 |
| Donald Russell | 4-0 | 10 | 46 | 1 | 45 | 4.5 | 0 | 12 | 11.2 |
| Mike Hartline | 5-0 | 15 | 47 | 20 | 27 | 1.8 | 0 | 9 | 5.4 |
| Will Fidler | 5-0 | 9 | 36 | 12 | 24 | 2.7 | 1 | 11 | 4.8 |
| Morgan Newton | 2-0 | 11 | 37 | 13 | 24 | 2.2 | 1 | 10 | 12.0 |
| AJ Nance | 7-0 | 1 | 4 | 0 | 4 | 4.0 | 0 | 4 | 0.6 |
| Maurice Grinter | 7-0 | 2 | 2 | 0 | 2 | 1.0 | 0 | 2 | 0.3 |
| TEAM | 7-0 | 4 | 0 | -7 | -1.8 | -1.8 | 0 | 0 | -1.0 |
| Total | 7 | 280 | 1399 | 95 | 1304 | 4.7 | 13 | 61 | 186.3 |
| Opponents | 7 | 274 | 1338 | 119 | 1219 | 4.4 | 8 | 35 | 174.1 |

==== Passing ====
| Name | GP-GS | Effic | Att-Cmp | Pct | Yds | TD-INT | Lng | Avg/G |
|---|---|---|---|---|---|---|---|---|
| Mike Hartline | 5-5 | 119.2 | 77-127 | 60.6 | 792 | 6-6 | 55 | 158.4 |
| Will Fidler | 5-0 | 91.4 | 17-35 | 48.6 | 163 | 1-1 | 25 | 32.6 |
| Morgan Newton | 2-1 | 56.3 | 8-19 | 42.1 | 56 | 0-1 | 23 | 28.0 |
| Randall Cobb | 7-1 | 97.7 | 2-6 | 33.3 | 46 | 0 | 37 | 6.6 |
| Tyler Sargeant | 1-0 | 0.0 | 0-1 | 0.0 | 0 | 0 | 0 | 0 |
| Total | 7 | 105.8 | 104-189 | 55.0 | 1057 | 7-8 | 55 | 151.0 |
| Opponents | 7 | 111.4 | 100-199 | 50.3 | 1247 | 10-8 | 66 | 178.1 |

==== Receiving ====
| Name | GP-GS | Receptions | Yds | Avg | TD | Long | Avg/G |
|---|---|---|---|---|---|---|---|
| Randall Cobb | 7-6 | 28 | 349 | 12.5 | 4 | 55 | 49.9 |
| Chris Matthews | 7-6 | 19 | 212 | 11.2 | 1 | 37 | 30.3 |
| Derrick Locke | 7-0 | 16 | 128 | 8.0 | 0 | 21 | 18.3 |
| Gene McCaskill | 7-1 | 8 | 96 | 12.0 | 0 | 31 | 13.7 |
| Kyrus Lanxter | 5-0 | 7 | 58 | 8.3 | 0 | 16 | 11.6 |
| John Conner | 6-0 | 5 | 46 | 9.2 | 1 | 25 | 7.7 |
| TC Drake | 7-0 | 4 | 50 | 12.5 | 0 | 20 | 7.1 |
| Moncell Allen | 7-0 | 4 | 19 | 4.8 | 0 | 7 | 2.7 |
| Matt Roark | 7-0 | 3 | 30 | 10.0 | 0 | 15 | 4.3 |
| Nick Melilo | 7-0 | 3 | 22 | 7.3 | 0 | 8 | 3.1 |
| Ross Bogue | 7-0 | 2 | 14 | 7.0 | 1 | 12 | 2.0 |
| Eric Adeyemi | 6-0 | 2 | 10 | 5.0 | 0 | 6 | 1.7 |
| Gabe Correll | 2-0 | 1 | 15 | 15.0 | 0 | 15 | 7.5 |
| Alfonso Smith | 7-0 | 1 | 0 | 0.0 | 0 | 0 | 0.0 |
| Total | 7 | 104 | 1057 | 10.2 | 7 | 55 | 151.0 |
| Opponents | 7 | 100 | 1247 | 12.5 | 10 | 66 | 178.1 |

=== Defense ===
| Name | GP-GS | Tackles | | | | Sacks | Pass defense | | Interceptions | | | | Fumbles | | Blkd Kick |
| Name | GP-GS | Solo | Ast | Total | TFL-Yds | No-Yds | BrUp | QBH | No.-Yds | Avg | TD | Long | No.-Yds | FF | Blkd Kick |
|---|---|---|---|---|---|---|---|---|---|---|---|---|---|---|---|
| Micah Johnson | 7-7 | 24 | 31 | 55 | 4.5-6 | 1.0-1 | 2 | 1 | 0 | 0 | 0 | 0 | 0 | 0 | 0 |
| Danny Trevathan | 7-7 | 27 | 20 | 47 | 2.0-5 | 0 | 1 | 0 | 0 | 0 | 0 | 0 | 0 | 0 | 0 |
| Calvin Harrison | 7-7 | 24 | 18 | 42 | 2.0-5 | 0 | 1 | 0 | 2-42 | 42 | 0 | 21 | 1-13 | 0 | 0 |
| Sam Maxwell | 7-7 | 27 | 15 | 42 | 3.5-8 | 0.5-3 | 5 | 0 | 2-26 | 0 | 13 | 0 | 0 | 0 | 0 |
| Winston Guy | 7-7 | 20 | 22 | 42 | 1.5-9 | 1.0-7 | 4 | 0 | 0 | 0 | 0 | 0 | 0 | 0 | 0 |
| Corey Peters | 7-7 | 14 | 14 | 28 | 7.5-38 | 4.0-32 | 3 | 4 | 0 | 0 | 0 | 0 | 1-0 | 0 | 0 |
| Randall Burden | 7-3 | 17 | 5 | 22 | 0.5-2 | 0 | 5 | 1-50 | 50.0 | 1 | 50 | 0 | 0 | 0 | 0 |
| DeQuin Evans | 7-7 | 7 | 12 | 19 | 6.0-25 | 3.0-21 | 0 | 1 | 0 | 0 | 0 | 0 | 0 | 0 | 0 |
| Matt Lentz | 7-0 | 17 | 1 | 18 | 0-0 | 0 | 1 | 0 | 1-23 | 23.0 | 0 | 23 | 0 | 0 | 0 |
| Trevard Lindley | 4-4 | 11 | 2 | 13 | 1.0-4 | 0 | 4 | 0 | 1-25 | 25 | 1 | 26 | 0 | 0 | 0 |
| Ricky Lumpkin | 7-7 | 9 | 4 | 13 | 1.0-1 | 0 | 0 | 0 | 0 | 0 | 0 | 0 | 0 | 0 | 0 |
| Paul Warford | 4-4 | 8 | 3 | 11 | 0-0 | 0 | 4 | 0 | 0 | 0 | 0 | 0 | 0 | 0 | 0 |
| Taylor Wyndham | 7-2 | 5 | 7 | 12 | 2.5-11 | 2.0-9 | 2 | 1 | 0 | 0 | 0 | 0 | 0 | 1 | 0 |
| Taiedo Smith | 7-0 | 6 | 5 | 11 | 0-0 | 0 | 0 | 0 | 0 | 0 | 0 | 0 | 0 | 0 | 0 |
| Martavius Neloms | 6-1 | 7 | 4 | 11 | 0-0 | 0 | 0 | 0 | 0 | 0 | 0 | 0 | 0 | 0 | 0 |
| Collins Ukwu | 7-4 | 6 | 4 | 10 | 1.5-6 | 0.5-2 | 1 | 1 | 0 | 0 | 0 | 0 | 0 | 0 | 0 |
| Ronnie Sneed | 7-0 | 3 | 6 | 9 | 0-0 | 0 | 1 | 0 | 0 | 0 | 0 | 0 | 0 | 0 | 0 |
| Chandler Burden | 7-2 | 4 | 4 | 8 | 0.5-1 | 0 | 0 | 1 | 0 | 0 | 0 | 0 | 0 | 0 | 0 |
| Mark Crawford | 7-0 | 1 | 7 | 8 | 0-0 | 0 | 1 | 0 | 0 | 0 | 0 | 0 | 0 | 0 | 0 |
| Shane McCord | 7-0 | 5 | 2 | 7 | 0-0 | 0 | 0 | 0 | 0 | 0 | 0 | 0 | 0 | 0 | 0 |
| AJ Nance | 7-0 | 3 | 2 | 5 | 0-0 | 0 | 1 | 0 | 0 | 0 | 0 | 0 | 1-0 | 0 | 0 |
| Ashton Cobb | 5-0 | 3 | 1 | 4 | 0-0 | 0 | 0 | 0 | 1-3 | 3.0 | 0 | 3 | 0 | 0 | 0 |
| Matt Roark | 7-0 | 2 | 2 | 4 | 0-0 | 0 | 0 | 0 | 0 | 0 | 0 | 0 | 0 | 0 | 0 |
| Moncell Allen | 7-0 | 4 | 0 | 4 | 0-0 | 0 | 0 | 0 | 0 | 0 | 0 | 0 | 0 | 0 | 0 |
| Alfonso Smith | 7-0 | 3 | 1 | 4 | 0-0 | 0 | 0 | 0 | 0 | 0 | 0 | 0 | 0 | 0 | 0 |
| Cartier Rice | 4-0 | 2 | 1 | 3 | 0-0 | 0 | 0 | 0 | 0 | 0 | 0 | 0 | 0 | 0 | 0 |
| Jacob Dufrene | 7-0 | 3 | 0 | 3 | 0-0 | 0 | 0 | 0 | 0 | 0 | 0 | 0 | 0 | 0 | 0 |
| Randall Cobb | 7-0 | 2 | 0 | 2 | 0-0 | 0 | 0 | 0 | 0 | 0 | 0 | 0 | 0 | 0 | 0 |
| Greg Wilson | 7-0 | 1 | 1 | 2 | 0-0 | 0 | 0 | 0 | 0 | 0 | 0 | 0 | 0 | 0 | 0 |
| Antwane Glenn | 2-0 | 0 | 1 | 1 | 0-0 | 0 | 0 | 0 | 0 | 0 | 0 | 0 | 0 | 0 | 0 |
| Greg Meisner | 3-0 | 2 | 0 | 2 | 0-0 | 0 | 1 | 0 | 0 | 0 | 0 | 0 | 0 | 0 | 0 |
| Chris Matthews | 6-0 | 1 | 0 | 1 | 0-0 | 0 | 0 | 0 | 0 | 0 | 0 | 0 | 0 | 0 | 0 |
| Ridge Wilson | 6-0 | 0 | 1 | 1 | 0-0 | 0 | 0 | 0 | 0 | 0 | 0 | 0 | 0 | 0 | 0 |
| Mikhail Mabry | 7-0 | 0 | 1 | 1 | 0-0 | 0 | 0 | 0 | 0 | 0 | 0 | 0 | 0 | 0 | 0 |
| Antonio Thomas | 2-0 | 0 | 1 | 1 | 0-0 | 0 | 0 | 0 | 0 | 0 | 0 | 0 | 0 | 0 | 0 |
| Anthony Mosley | 4-0 | 1 | 0 | 1 | 0-0 | 0 | 0 | 0 | 0 | 0 | 0 | 0 | 0 | 0 | 0 |
| Ross Bogue | 7-0 | 0 | 1 | 1 | 0-0 | 0 | 0 | 0 | 0 | 0 | 0 | 0 | 0 | 0 | 0 |
| Mike Hartline | 6-0 | 1 | 0 | 1 | 0-0 | 0 | 0 | 0 | 0 | 0 | 0 | 0 | 0 | 0 | 0 |
| Total | 7 | 282 | 196 | 478 | 35-123 | 12-75 | 43 | 9 | 8-169 | 21.1 | 2 | 50 | 3-13 | 1 | 0 |
| Opponents | 7 | 281 | 224 | 505 | 28-92 | 7-40 | 24 | 17 | 8-64 | 8.0 | 0 | 0 | 3-45 | 4 | 0 |

=== Special teams ===
| Name | Punting | | | | | | | | Field goals | | | | Kickoffs | | | | |
| Name | No. | Yds | Avg | Long | TB | FC | I20 | Blkd | Att. | Made | Pct. | Long | No. | Yds | Avg | TB | OB |
|---|---|---|---|---|---|---|---|---|---|---|---|---|---|---|---|---|---|
| Lones Seiber | 0 | 0 | 0 | 0 | 0 | 0 | 0 | 0 | 5 | 8 | 62.5 | 49 | 16 | 1046 | 65.4 | 1 | 0 |
| Ryan Tydlacka | 34 | 1343 | 39.5 | 59 | 3 | 11 | 12 | 6 | 0 | 0 | 0 | 0 | 0 | 0 | 0 | 0 | 0 |
| Craig McIntosh | 0 | 0 | 0 | 0 | 0 | 0 | 0 | 0 | 0 | 0 | 0 | 0 | 20 | 1214 | 60.7 | 2 | 1 |
| Total | 35 | 1343 | 38.4 | 59 | 3 | 11 | 12 | 1 | 5 | 8 | 62.5 | 49 | 36 | 2260 | 62.8 | 3 | 1 |
| Opponents | 37 | 1390 | 37.6 | 56 | 3 | 7 | 7 | 0 | 3 | 8 | 37.5 | 34 | 34 | 2055 | 60.4 | 4 | 1 |

| Name | Punt returns | | | | | Kick returns | | | | |
| Name | No. | Yds | Avg | TD | Long | No. | Yds | Avg | TD | Long |
|---|---|---|---|---|---|---|---|---|---|---|
| Derrick Locke | 0 | 0 | 0 | 0 | 0 | 4 | 191 | 47.75 | 1 | 100 |
| Alfonso Smith | 0 | 0 | 0 | 0 | 0 | 2 | 35 | 17.5 | 0 | 19 |
| Winston Guy | 0 | 0 | 0 | 0 | 0 | 1 | 28 | 28 | 0 | 28 |
| Randall Cobb | 14 | 191 | 13.6 | 1 | 73 | 0 | 0 | 0 | 0 | 0 |
| Gene McCaskill | 1 | 10 | 0 | 10 | 10 | 0 | 0 | 0 | 0 | 0 |
| Total | 15 | 201 | 13.4 | 1 | 73 | 29 | 667 | 23.0 | 1 | 100 |
| Opponents | 7 | 49 | 7.0 | 1 | 23 | 32 | 731 | 22.8 | 0 | 65 |

== Rankings ==
Ranking movements Legend: — = Not ranked
| | Week | | | | | | | | | | | | | | | | |
| Poll | Pre | 1 | 2 | 3 | 4 | 5 | 6 | 7 | 8 | 9 | 10 | 11 | 12 | 13 | 14 | 15 | Final |
|---|---|---|---|---|---|---|---|---|---|---|---|---|---|---|---|---|---|
| AP | — | — | — | — | — | — | — | — | — | — | | | | | | | |
| Coaches | — | — | — | — | — | — | — | — | — | — | | | | | | | |
| Harris | Not released | | | | | — | — | — | — | — | | | | | | | Not released |
| BCS | Not released | | | | | | | | — | — | | | | | | | Not released |

== Class of 2010 commitments/signees ==
College recruiting information
| Name | Hometown | School | Height | Weight | Commit date |
|---|---|---|---|---|---|
| Mychal Bailey; DB | LaGrange, Georgia | Southwest Mississippi C.C. | 6 ft 0 in (1.83 m) | 206 lb (93 kg) | Sep 11, 2009 |
| Mychal Bailey; DB | Recruit ratings: Scout: Rivals: | | | | |
| Tyler Brause; QB | Bucyrus, Ohio | Wynford | 6 ft 4 in (1.93 m) | 220 lb (100 kg) | Aug 20, 2009 |
| Tyler Brause; QB | Recruit ratings: Scout: Rivals: (73) | | | | |
| Alvin Davis; DE | Jesup, Georgia | Wayne County | 6 ft 4 in (1.93 m) | 225 lb (102 kg) | Oct 21, 2009 |
| Alvin Davis; DE | Recruit ratings: Scout: Rivals: (40) | | | | |
| Nermin Delic; TE/DE | Tunnel Hill, Georgia | Northwest Whitfield | 6 ft 5 in (1.96 m) | 228 lb (103 kg) | Nov 25, 2009 |
| Nermin Delic; TE/DE | Recruit ratings: Scout: Rivals: (77) | | | | |
| Mike Douglas; DE | Largo, Florida | Largo | 6 ft 5 in (1.96 m) | 225 lb (102 kg) | Dec 14, 2009 |
| Mike Douglas; DE | Recruit ratings: Scout: Rivals: (75) | | | | |
| Teven Eatmon; TE/OL | Bucyrus, Ohio | Wynford | 6 ft 7 in (2.01 m) | 280 lb (130 kg) | Aug 20, 2009 |
| Teven Eatmon; TE/OL | Recruit ratings: Scout: Rivals: (77) | | | | |
| Brandon Gainer; RB | Miami, Florida | Miami | 6 ft 0 in (1.83 m) | 200 lb (91 kg) | Feb 3, 2010 |
| Brandon Gainer; RB | Recruit ratings: Scout: Rivals: (80) | | | | |
| Kenarious Gates; OT | Greenville, Georgia | Greenville | 6 ft 5 in (1.96 m) | 285 lb (129 kg) | Dec 20, 2009 |
| Kenarious Gates; OT | Recruit ratings: Scout: Rivals: (72) | | | | |
| Josh Gibbs; SS | Santa Clarita, California | College of the Canyons | 6 ft 0 in (1.83 m) | 200 lb (91 kg) | Sep 15, 2009 |
| Josh Gibbs; SS | Recruit ratings: Scout: Rivals: | | | | |
| Justin Henderson; DE | Bamberg, South Carolina | Bamberg-Ehrhardt | 6 ft 4 in (1.93 m) | 230 lb (100 kg) | Apr 18, 2009 |
| Justin Henderson; DE | Recruit ratings: Scout: Rivals: (74) | | | | |
| Farrington Huguenin; DE | Columbia, South Carolina | Dreher | 6 ft 4 in (1.93 m) | 240 lb (110 kg) | Jan 29, 2010 |
| Farrington Huguenin; DE | Recruit ratings: Scout: Rivals: (40) | | | | |
| Jabari Johnson; LB | Stone Mountain, Georgia | Stephenson | 6 ft 2 in (1.88 m) | 220 lb (100 kg) | Oct 30, 2009 |
| Jabari Johnson; LB | Recruit ratings: Scout: Rivals: (77) | | | | |
| Brice Laughlin; DT | Summerville, South Carolina | Summerville | 6 ft 3 in (1.91 m) | 260 lb (120 kg) | Dec 7, 2009 |
| Brice Laughlin; DT | Recruit ratings: Scout: Rivals: (78) | | | | |
| Joseph Mansour; K | LaGrange, Georgia | LaGrange | 6 ft 3 in (1.91 m) | 174 lb (79 kg) | Jul 1, 2009 |
| Joseph Mansour; K | Recruit ratings: Scout: Rivals: (71) | | | | |
| Tim McAdoo; DT | Murfreesboro, Tennessee | Oakland | 6 ft 2 in (1.88 m) | 310 lb (140 kg) | Aug 17, 2009 |
| Tim McAdoo; DT | Recruit ratings: Scout: Rivals: (76) | | | | |
| Malcolm McDuffen; LB | Hopkinsville, Kentucky | Christian County | 6 ft 3 in (1.91 m) | 205 lb (93 kg) | Sep 19, 2009 |
| Malcolm McDuffen; LB | Recruit ratings: Scout: Rivals: (77) | | | | |
| Elliot Porter; DT | Marrero, Louisiana | Archbishop Shaw | 6 ft 4 in (1.93 m) | 275 lb (125 kg) | Aug 13, 2009 |
| Elliot Porter; DT | Recruit ratings: Scout: Rivals: (79) | | | | |
| Tyler Robinson; TE | Alcoa, Tennessee | Alcoa | 6 ft 4 in (1.93 m) | 250 lb (110 kg) | Sep 26, 2009 |
| Tyler Robinson; TE | Recruit ratings: Scout: Rivals: (77) | | | | |
| Raymond Sanders; RB | Stone Mountain, Georgia | Stephenson | 5 ft 8 in (1.73 m) | 175 lb (79 kg) | Aug 2, 2009 |
| Raymond Sanders; RB | Recruit ratings: Scout: Rivals: (76) | | | | |
| Ronnie Shields; TE | Stone Mountain, Georgia | Stephenson | 6 ft 5 in (1.96 m) | 220 lb (100 kg) | Oct 30, 2009 |
| Ronnie Shields; TE | Recruit ratings: Scout: Rivals: (73) | | | | |
| Eric Simmons; DB | Atlanta, Georgia | Westlake | 6 ft 0 in (1.83 m) | 185 lb (84 kg) | Oct 14, 2009 |
| Eric Simmons; DB | Recruit ratings: Scout: (78) | | | | |
| Alex Smith; TE | Cincinnati, Ohio | Lakota West | 6 ft 5 in (1.96 m) | 225 lb (102 kg) | Feb 3, 2010 |
| Alex Smith; TE | Recruit ratings: Scout: Rivals: (78) | | | | |
| Ryan Smith; DB | Cordova, Alabama | Cordova | 6 ft 2 in (1.88 m) | 208 lb (94 kg) | Oct 15, 2009 |
| Ryan Smith; DB | Recruit ratings: Scout: Rivals: (74) | | | | |
| Dale Trimble; DB | Gadsden, Alabama | Gadsden | 5 ft 10 in (1.78 m) | 165 lb (75 kg) | Dec 6, 2009 |
| Dale Trimble; DB | Recruit ratings: Scout: Rivals: (79) | | | | |
| Avery Williamson; LB | Milan, Tennessee | Milan | 6 ft 2 in (1.88 m) | 220 lb (100 kg) | Nov 19, 2009 |
| Avery Williamson; LB | Recruit ratings: Scout: Rivals: (74) | | | | |
Overall recruit ranking:
Note: In many cases, Scout, Rivals, 247Sports, On3, and ESPN may conflict in their listings of height and weight.; In these cases, the average was taken. ESPN grades are on a 100-point scale.; Sources: "Kentucky 2010 Football Commitments". Rivals.; "2010 Kentucky Football Commits". Scout.; "ESPN". ESPN.; "Scout.com Team Recruiting Rankings". Scout.; "2010 Team Ranking". Rivals.com.

=== Class of 2011 commitments ===
College recruiting information
| Name | Hometown | School | Height | Weight | 40^{‡} | Commit date |
|---|---|---|---|---|---|---|
| Jon Davis; TE | Louisville, Kentucky | Eastern | 6 ft 3 in (1.91 m) | 235 lb (107 kg) | 4.6 | Dec 11, 2009 |
| Jon Davis; TE | Recruit ratings: Scout: | | | | | |
| Darrian Miller; OT | Lexington, Kentucky | Bryan Station | 6 ft 6 in (1.98 m) | 265 lb (120 kg) | 4.87 | Dec 20, 2009 |
| Darrian Miller; OT | Recruit ratings: Scout: | | | | | |
Overall recruit ranking:
Note: In many cases, Scout, Rivals, 247Sports, On3, and ESPN may conflict in their listings of height and weight.; In these cases, the average was taken. ESPN grades are on a 100-point scale.; Sources: "Kentucky 2011 Football Commitments". Rivals.; "2011 Kentucky Football Commits". Scout.; "ESPN". ESPN.; "Scout.com Team Recruiting Rankings". Scout.; "2011 Team Ranking". Rivals.com.
