= Florida–Kentucky rivalry =

American college multi-sports rivalry

- Florida Gators Kentucky Wildcats
- Sport: Basketball; Football

The Florida–Kentucky rivalry is a college sports rivalry between the University of Florida Gators and the University of Kentucky Wildcats. The rivalry between these schools, both founding members of the Southeastern Conference, has existed since before the conference's founding. Both teams are historic basketball rivals, both winning multiple national championships and conference championships over the past 100 years. In recent years, the football rivalry between Kentucky and Florida has escalated due to Kentucky breaking a streak of 31 consecutive years where the Florida Gators had beaten them. Despite the lopsidedness of the football series, Kentucky has won four of the last six games between the two.

Due to each team enjoying large periods of time of dominance in their respective sports, the two team's fan bases are incredibly hostile towards each other. Examples of this include:

- In 2017, several Kentucky football fans received backlash for displaying a sign making fun of Hurricane Irma. The sign said: "If Hurricane Irma didn't FUK (sic) you up, CATS will."
- In their February 2023 men's basketball meeting, an usher at Rupp Arena "Doug the Blue Coat" was fired by the University of Kentucky after showing his middle finger to several Florida Gators' fans. This firing resulted in a Kentucky student-led campaign to have the usher rehired under the hashtag "#FreeDoug."
- During that same game, 3 Florida fans were ejected after grabbing Kentucky guard Cason Wallace.
- In recent years, the University of Kentucky has licensed merchandise with companies that sell clothing that say "Gator Hater" or "Later Gator" on them.
- While this rivalry is predominantly focused on men's sports, it's worth noting that in March 2023, a fight broke out between the Kentucky and Florida women's basketball teams. This fight resulted in 8 ejections.
- In the 2023 and 2025 meetings between the two football teams, multiple different Florida fans would be ejected from Kroger Field for fighting Kentucky fans.
Location of Kentucky and Florida

== Men's basketball ==
Florida–Kentucky men's basketball rivalry
- Florida Gators Kentucky Wildcats
- Sport: Men's Basketball
- First meeting: January 23, 1927; Kentucky 44, Florida 36
- Latest meeting: March 13, 2026; Florida 71, Kentucky 63
- Next meeting: TBD
- Stadiums: Rupp Arena (Kentucky) O'Connell Center (Florida)

Statistics
- Total meetings: 156
- All-time series: Kentucky, 111–45
- Longest win streak: Kentucky, 18 (1942–1964)
- Current win streak: Florida, 3 (2026–present)

In basketball, the two schools were permanent SEC rivals until 2024, meaning that they were scheduled to play twice a year in the SEC regular season while they rotate which four of the other 12 SEC teams they will play twice that season. With the additions of Oklahoma and Texas to the SEC in the 2025 season, however, the teams play once a year (or twice in the regular season as part of the 13 "rotating" SEC teams), meaning they are not considered "permanent" rivals. Florida and Kentucky first met in 1927, with Kentucky winning 44–36. The two teams have played 156 times in total, with Kentucky holding a commanding 111–45 lead in the series. Despite Kentucky's lopsided series lead, this rivalry has produced many memorable games, including several match-ups in the SEC Tournament Championship Game (the most recent of which Florida defeated Kentucky 61–60, in 2014). Billy Donovan's arrival to Gainesville increased the competitiveness, with the rivalry placing seventh-best in college basketball on a 2013 ranking by Bleacher Report.^{[2]} In addition, the Gators also hold the distinction of being the only team to ever defeat Kentucky seven straight times.

Kentucky leads the overall series 111–45, and leads the SEC Championship Game series 3–2. However, the rivalry has become much more even lately in the 2000s and 2010s, with Kentucky holding a 27–21 series lead since 2005, and Florida having a 2–1 advantage in the last three SEC Championship Game meetings. Kentucky victories are shaded blue, Florida victories are shaded orange. Games with * denote a meeting in the SEC Tournament, while games with ** denote a meeting in the SEC Tournament Championship Game.

=== Game results ===
Florida victories	Kentucky victories	Tie games

No.	Date	Location	Winner	Score
1	1927	Lexington, KY	Kentucky	44–36
2	1931	Atlanta, GA	Kentucky	56–36
3	1933	Atlanta, GA	Kentucky	48–24
4	1934	Atlanta, GA	Florida	38–32
5	1942	Louisville, KY	Kentucky	42–36
6	1945	Louisville, KY	Kentucky	37–35
7	1946	Louisville, KY	Kentucky	69–32
8	1948	Louisville, KY	Kentucky	87–31
9	1949	Louisville, KY	Kentucky	73–36
10	1950	Lexington, KY	Kentucky	85–37
11	1952	Gainesville, FL	Kentucky	99–52
12	1954	Gainesville, FL	Kentucky	97–55
13	1955	Lexington, KY	Kentucky	87–63
14	1956	Gainesville, FL	Kentucky	81–70
15	1957	Lexington, KY	Kentucky	88–61
16	1958	Gainesville, FL	Kentucky	78–56
17	1959	Lexington, KY	Kentucky	94–51
18	1960	Gainesville, FL	Kentucky	75–62
19	1961	Lexington, KY	Kentucky	69–68
20	1962	Gainesville, FL	Kentucky	81–69
21	1963	Lexington, KY	Kentucky	94–71
22	1964	Gainesville, FL	Kentucky	77–72
23	1965	Gainesville, FL	Florida	84–68
24	1965	Lexington, KY	Kentucky	78–61
25	1966	Gainesville, FL	Kentucky	78–64
26	1966	Lexington, KY	Kentucky	85–75
27	1966	Lexington, KY	Florida	78–75
28	1967	Gainesville, FL	Florida	89–72
29	1967	Lexington, KY	Kentucky	99–76
30	1968	Gainesville, FL	Florida	96–78
31	1969	Lexington, KY	Kentucky	88–67
32	1968	Gainesville, FL	Florida	82–81
33	1970	Gainesville, FL	Kentucky	88–69
34	1970	Lexington, KY	Kentucky	110–66
35	1971	Lexington, KY	Kentucky	101–75
36	1971	Gainesville, FL	Florida	74–65
37	1972	Gainesville, FL	Florida	72–70
38	1972	Lexington, KY	Kentucky	95–68
39	1973	Lexington, KY	Kentucky	95–65
40	1973	Gainesville, FL	Kentucky	94–83
41	1974	Gainesville, FL	Kentucky	91–82
42	1974	Lexington, KY	Florida	75–65
43	1975	Lexington, KY	Kentucky	86–65
44	1975	Gainesville, FL	Florida	66–58
45	1976	Gainesville, FL	Kentucky	89–82
46	1976	Lexington, KY	Kentucky	96–89
47	1977	Gainesville, FL	Kentucky	73–71
48	1977	Lexington, KY	Kentucky	104–78
49	1978	Gainesville, FL	Kentucky	86–67
50	1978	Lexington, KY	Kentucky	88–61
51	1979	Gainesville, FL	Florida	76–65
52	1979	Lexington, KY	Kentucky	87–81
53	1980	Gainesville, FL	Kentucky	76–63
54	1980	Lexington, KY	Kentucky	95–70
55	1981	Gainesville, FL	Kentucky	69–56
56	1981	Lexington, KY	Kentucky	102–48
57	1982	Gainesville, FL	Kentucky	91–76
58	1982	Lexington, KY	Kentucky	84–78
59	1983	Lexington, KY	Kentucky	70–63
60	1983	Gainesville, FL	Kentucky	73–61
61	1984	Gainesville, FL	Florida	69–57
62	1984	Lexington, KY	Kentucky	67–65
63	1985	Lexington, KY	Florida	67–55
64	1985	Gainesville, FL	Kentucky	76–68
65	1985	Birmingham, AL	Florida	58–55
66	1986	Gainesville, FL	Kentucky	72–55
67	1986	Lexington, KY	Kentucky	80–69
68	1987	Lexington, KY	Kentucky	67–62
69	1987	Gainesville, FL	Florida	74–56
70	1988	Lexington, KY	Florida	58–56
71	1988	Gainesville, FL	Florida	83–76
72	1989	Gainesville, FL	Kentucky	69–56
73	1989	Lexington, KY	Florida	59–53
74	1990	Lexington, KY	Kentucky	89–81
75	1990	Gainesville, FL	Kentucky	78–74
76	1991	Lexington, KY	Kentucky	81–65
77	1991	Gainesville, FL	Kentucky	90–74
78	1992	Lexington, KY	Kentucky	81–60
79	1992	Gainesville, FL	Florida	79–62

No.	Date	Location	Winner	Score
80	1993	Lexington, KY	Kentucky	71–48
81	1993	Gainesville, FL	Kentucky	85–77
82	1994	Gainesville, FL	Florida	59–57
83	1994	Lexington, KY	Kentucky	80–77
84	1994	Memphis, TN	Kentucky	73–60
85	1995	Gainesville, FL	Kentucky	83–67
86	1995	Lexington, KY	Kentucky	87–77
87	1995	Atlanta, GA	Kentucky	86–72
88	1996	Lexington, KY	Kentucky	77–63
89	1996	Gainesville, FL	Kentucky	94–63
90	1996	New Orleans, LA	Kentucky	100–76
91	1997	Gainesville, FL	Kentucky	92–65
92	1997	Lexington, KY	Kentucky	85–56
93	1998	Lexington, KY	Florida	86–78
94	1998	Gainesville, FL	Kentucky	79–54
95	1999	Lexington, KY	Kentucky	93–58
96	1999	Gainesville, FL	Florida	75–68
97	2000	Gainesville, FL	Florida	90–73
98	2000	Lexington, KY	Kentucky	85–70
99	2001	Lexington, KY	Kentucky	71–70
100	2001	Gainesville, FL	Florida	94–86
101	2002	Gainesville, FL	Kentucky	70–68
102	2002	Lexington, KY	Kentucky	70–67
103	2003	Lexington, KY	Kentucky	70–55
104	2003	Gainesville, FL	Kentucky	69–67
105	2004	Gainesville, FL	Kentucky	68–65
106	2004	Lexington, KY	Kentucky	82–62
107	2004	Atlanta, GA	Kentucky	89–73
108	2005	Lexington, KY	Kentucky	69–66
109	2005	Gainesville, FL	Florida	53–52
110	2005	Atlanta, GA	Florida	70–53
111	2006	Gainesville, FL	Florida	95–80
112	2006	Lexington, KY	Florida	79–64
113	2007	Lexington, KY	Florida	64–61
114	2007	Gainesville, FL	Florida	85–72
115	2008	Gainesville, FL	Florida	81–70
116	2008	Lexington, KY	Kentucky	75–70
117	2009	Lexington, KY	Kentucky	68–65
118	2009	Gainesville, FL	Florida	60–53
119	2010	Gainesville, FL	Kentucky	89–77
120	2010	Lexington, KY	Kentucky	74–66
121	2011	Gainesville, FL	Florida	70–68
122	2011	Lexington, KY	Kentucky	76–68
123	2011	Atlanta, GA	Kentucky	70–54
124	2012	Lexington, KY	Kentucky	78–68
125	2012	Gainesville, FL	Kentucky	74–59
126	2012	New Orleans, LA	Kentucky	74–71
127	2013	Gainesville, FL	Florida	69–52
128	2013	Lexington, KY	Kentucky	61–57
129	2014	Lexington, KY	Florida	69–59
130	2014	Gainesville, FL	Florida	84–65
131	2014	Atlanta, GA	Florida	61–60
132	2015	Gainesville, FL	Kentucky	68–61
133	2015	Lexington, KY	Kentucky	67–50
134	2015	Nashville, TN	Kentucky	64–49
135	2016	Lexington, KY	Kentucky	80–61
136	2016	Gainesville, FL	Kentucky	88–79
137	2017	Gainesville, FL	Florida	88–66
138	2017	Lexington, KY	Kentucky	76–66
139	2018	Lexington, KY	Florida	66–64
140	2018	Gainesville, FL	Florida	80–67
141	2019	Gainesville, FL	Kentucky	65–54
142	2019	Lexington, KY	Kentucky	66–57
143	2020	Lexington, KY	Kentucky	65–59
144	2020	Gainesville, FL	Kentucky	71–70
145	2021	Gainesville, FL	Kentucky	75–58
146	2021	Lexington, KY	Florida	71–67
147	2022	Lexington, KY	Kentucky	78–57
148	2022	Gainesville, FL	Kentucky	71–63
149	2023	Lexington, KY	Kentucky	72–67
150	2023	Gainesville, FL	Kentucky	82–74
151	2024	Gainesville, FL	Kentucky	87–85
152	2024	Lexington, KY	Florida	94–91^{OT}
153	2025	Lexington, KY	Kentucky	106–100
154	2026	Gainesville, FL	Florida	92–83
155	2026	Lexington, KY	Florida	84–77
156	2026	Nashville, TN	Florida	71–63
Series: Kentucky leads 111–45

== Football ==
Florida–Kentucky football rivalry
- Florida Gators Kentucky Wildcats
- Sport: American football
- First meeting: November 29, 1917; Kentucky 52, Florida 0
- Latest meeting: November 14, 2026; Florida 21, Kentucky 14
- Next meeting: 2027
- Stadiums: Kroger Field (Kentucky); Ben Hill Griffin Stadium (Florida)
- Trophy: None

Statistics
- Total meetings: 77
- All-time series: Florida leads, 55–21 (1 Kentucky win vacated)
- Largest victory: Florida, 73–7 (1994)
- Longest win streak: Florida, 31 (1987–2017)
- Current win streak: Florida, 1 (2026–present)

When the Southeastern Conference (SEC) split into geographical divisions in 1992, Florida and Kentucky were both placed in the SEC East. This guaranteed that both teams play each other every season, which they have done consecutively since 1967. The Gators and Wildcats met in 2024 despite the end of SEC divisions after the 2023 season. In 2025, the SEC named Kentucky and Florida as new "permanent opponents," requiring the teams to play every single season. The two teams have played 76 times, with Florida holding a 54–21 lead in the series. From 1987 to 2017, Florida won every single game between the two schools. This 31-year streak was the third longest in FBS history, and the longest in the Southeastern Conference's history. Since 2018, the series has become competitive with Kentucky leading 4–3 (excluding the 2021 vacated Kentucky win). The rivalry is relatively new even though the series dates back to 1917.

Former Florida head coach Steve Spurrier was notable for having a particular disdain for Kentucky. During his tenure at Florida, he was known for running up the score in non-competitive games. In his 12 years coaching the Gators, Spurrier never lost to Kentucky, winning by an average score of 32.7 points. Spurrier was famous for the comments he made about his opponents (often referred to as "Spurrierisms") but he poked fun at Kentucky the most. Even after leaving Florida after the 2001 season, Steve Spurrier would go out of his way to make comments at Kentucky's expense. In November 2004, Steve Spurrier accepted the head coaching job at the University of South Carolina. In 2006, the South Carolina Gamecocks upset their rival, the Clemson Tigers. In the following week, Clemson would go on to lose to Kentucky in the 2006 Music City Bowl. Following the bowl game, Steve Spurrier said" "We thought we had done something good beating Clemson. And then Kentucky beat 'em."

From 1967 to 1991, the game was played exclusively on either the second or third Saturday in November. Since SEC expansion in 1992, the teams have, for the most part, played in September, with only five exceptions. The 2007, 2008, 2021 and 2024 games were played in October while the 2020 game took place in November.

=== Notable games ===
==== 1917: First meeting | Kentucky 52 – Florida 0 ====
The Kentucky Wildcats defeated the Florida Gators 52–0 in the first-ever meeting between the schools. To date, this is Kentucky's largest margin of victory over Florida.

==== 1927: Florida's first win | Florida 27 – Kentucky 6 ====
In the third all-time meeting in series history, the Florida Gators defeated the Kentucky Wildcats by a score of 27–6. This was Florida's first-ever football win over Kentucky.

==== 1951: Bear's bunch make it four in a row | Kentucky 14 – Florida 6 ====
Led by head coach Bear Bryant, the Wildcats defeated the Gators by a score of 14–6 to earn their fourth straight win in the rivalry. The four-game streak is Kentucky's longest in the history of the series. Bryant would leave Kentucky two years later for Texas A&M's head coaching job before ultimately cementing his legacy as one of college football's greatest head coaches at Alabama.

==== 1967: Beginning of the annual series | Florida 28 – Kentucky 12 ====
The Florida Gators defeated the Kentucky Wildcats by a score of 28–12. The Gators and Wildcats have met every year without interruption on the football field since 1967.

==== 1980: Collinsworth's catch | Florida 17 – Kentucky 15 ====
Gators receiver Cris Collinsworth made a tiptoe catch on the sideline that was disputed by Wildcats head coach Fran Curci. The catch helped set up kicker Brian Clark's game-winning 34-yard field goal in the closing seconds to win it for Florida.

==== 1986: Kentucky's last win of the century | Kentucky 10 – Florida 3 ====
The Wildcats' "Wild Tackle 6" defense under head coach Jerry Claiborne held the Gators offense to just 220 total yards and three points as Kentucky won 10–3. The weather was cold and misty throughout the day at Commonwealth Stadium in Lexington. This would be the Wildcats last win over the Gators in the 20th century and last until 2018.

==== 1987: The streak begins | Florida 27 – Kentucky 14 ====
Gators wide receiver Stacey Simmons returned the opening kickoff 94 yards for a touchdown and added a 39-yard touchdown catch from quarterback Kerwin Bell as Florida beat Kentucky by a score of 27–14. This would be the first of Florida's 31 consecutive wins over Kentucky that wouldn't end until 2018.

==== 1993: Wuerffel to Doering | Florida 24 – Kentucky 20 ====
Gators quarterback Danny Wuerffel hit wide receiver Chris Doering with a 28-yard touchdown pass with three seconds remaining as Florida overcame seven turnovers committed in the game to win 24–20, breaking the hearts of the Kentucky faithful who had anxiously hoped for an upset. The seven turnovers forced by the Kentucky defense was a school record. Wuerffel, a redshirt freshman, made his second career start in the 1993 game against the Wildcats. Wuerffel would go on to win the Heisman Trophy in 1996.

==== 1994: "Disaster at every turn" | Florida 73 – Kentucky 7 ====
In the 1994 meeting between Kentucky and Florida, the Gators dominated the Wildcats 73–7. This 66-point rout was the worst defeat in 91 years for the Kentucky Wildcats. When asked about it, Kentucky head coach Bill Curry said: "It was just no contest...It was a disaster at every turn." Florida head coach Steve Spurrier followed up by saying "Obviously it got out of hand there...We didn't really plan on it, but it just worked out that way." Kentucky's season would produce more of the same, with the Wildcats going 1–10. Florida would enjoy a strong season, going 10–2–1 with an eventual loss to Florida State in the Sugar Bowl.

==== 1996: "It proves we're better than Kentucky" | Florida 65 – Kentucky 0 ====
In one of Florida's most dominant games, they beat Kentucky 65–0. Led by star quarterback Tim Couch, Kentucky traveled to Gainesville with hopes of upsetting the No. 1 ranked team in the country. Kentucky never stood a chance, gaining only 67 yards the entire game. Following the game, Steve Spurrier was asked "What does this victory prove about your team?" He replied: "These sort of games don't prove very much. All it proves is we're better than Kentucky." Later that season, Kentucky would fire their head coach, Bill Curry. Steve Spurrier would conclude his 1996 season with a national championship, the first in Florida's history.

==== 1997: Onside kick game | Florida 55 – Kentucky 28 ====
Following the dismissal of Kentucky's Bill Curry, the Wildcats hired Hal Mumme as his replacement. Hal Mumme was a primary architect of the modern Air raid offense, an offense notable for moving at a fast pace and throwing often. Mumme would also be known for his particularly bad defenses. In 1997 meeting between Kentucky and Florida, Kentucky's defense struggled mightily. To prevent the defense from having to play, Kentucky head coach Hal Mumme called for several onside kicks throughout the game. When asked about it after the game, Steve Spurrier remarked: "If I had a defense like Hal Mumme has, I would be trying them on every kickoff." Kentucky would end their 1997 season 5–6, missing a bowl game. Florida would conclude their 1997 season going 10–2, beating Penn State in the Florida Citrus Bowl.

==== 2000: Spurrier runs up the score | Florida 59 – Kentucky 31 ====
In 2000, Kentucky quarterback Jared Lorenzen threw for 360 yards and 2 touchdowns against the Gators. Spurrier responded by refusing to take a knee to end the game. With 1:13 to go in the game, Florida quarterback Rex Grossman threw a 43-yard touchdown pass to Florida wide receiver Jabbar Gaffney. Spurrier faced backlash from the Kentucky fanbase, which he responded to by saying: "I guess they're upset about that pass. Well I called it. If there's 1:13 left, would that have been any nicer? They were padding their stats and I decided we were going to pad ours. Because ours were sufferin'. If Kentucky wants to be mad about it, we'll be up in Lexington next year, and they can do something about it then." Kentucky would go on to only win 2 games in the 2000 season. Following the season's conclusion, Kentucky would part ways with head coach Hal Mumme as a result of a recruiting scandal.

==== 2003: Gators rally from 18 down in the fourth | Florida 24 – Kentucky 21 ====
Gators running back Ran Carthon's one-yard touchdown run with 3:15 left in the fourth quarter capped another Florida win over Kentucky. Trailing by 18 points in the fourth quarter, this marked the largest comeback in terms of deficit in the history of the Gators football program. Notably, this was Gators quarterback Chris Leak's first career college start. This was also Kentucky head coach Rich Brooks' first Florida–Kentucky football game, as he had taken over the Wildcats program prior to the 2003 season.

==== 2007: College GameDay appearance | Florida 45 – Kentucky 37 ====
ESPN's College GameDay made an appearance in Lexington, Kentucky at the 2007 game between the Gators and Wildcats, the only time ESPN's flagship college football pre-game show has broadcast live at a Florida–Kentucky football game. Both teams were playing good football entering the contest, with Kentucky fresh off a home upset of eventual national champion and then-top-ranked LSU in triple overtime and entering the game with a 6–1 record to start the season. Florida, meanwhile, was 4–2 on the season and had lost to the same LSU team Kentucky had previously beaten. The game proved to be a back and forth contest but the Gators ultimately prevailed with a 45–37 win, their 21st in a row over the Wildcats.

==== 2008: Gator beatdown | Florida 63 – Kentucky 5 ====
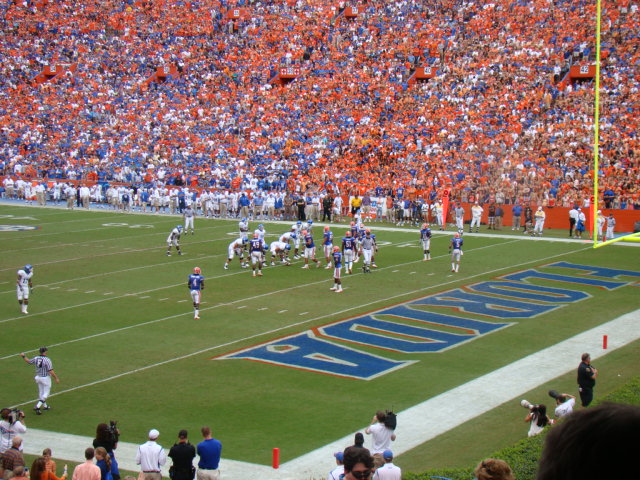
Ben Hill Griffin Stadium during the 2008 Florida–Kentucky game in which Florida would win 63–5.

The Gators thoroughly dominated from start to finish, blocking two punts and scoring four touchdowns in the first quarter before the Wildcats even gained a first down en route to a 63–5 blowout victory. This was the largest margin of victory for the Gators over the Wildcats in the modern history of the rivalry. Defending Heisman Trophy-winning quarterback Tim Tebow's two rushing touchdowns (to go along with two passing touchdowns) for the game tied him with Emmitt Smith for the most career rushing touchdowns by a single player in the history of the Florida football program. The Gators would go on to win the 2008 SEC Championship as well as the 2008 BCS national championship, their third overall and most recent in school history.

==== 2009: Tebow injury | Florida 41 – Kentucky 7 ====
The No. 1 ranked Florida Gators crushed the Kentucky Wildcats as the defending national champions won by 34 points. Notably, former Heisman Trophy-winning quarterback Tim Tebow entered the game with a respiratory illness. During the game, Kentucky defensive end Taylor Wyndham hit Tebow, knocking him to the ground where he hit his head on a teammate's knee. After hitting the ground, he remained "motionless". He was later helped to the sidelines, where he vomited. He was taken by ambulance to the University of Kentucky Chandler Medical Center, where he stayed overnight and was diagnosed with a concussion. Tim Tebow would go on to play in Florida's next game two weeks later, and for the remainder of the season which saw Florida beat Cincinnati 51–24 in the Sugar Bowl. Kentucky would also make a bowl appearance, which they would lose to Clemson 21–13. This would be Kentucky head coach Rich Brooks' last Florida–Kentucky game, as he would retire following the conclusion of the 2009 season.

==== 2014: Triple overtime thriller | Florida 36 – Kentucky 30 ====
The Florida Gators defeated the Kentucky Wildcats 36–30 in painful fashion as they win in triple overtime. The game was close throughout, but had a controversial overtime frame. In the first frame of overtime, Florida converted on a 4th and 7 for a 9-yard touchdown score. Kentucky argued that Florida didn't start the play in time, and thus should have been penalized. Following the competition of the game, the SEC released a statement regarding the call:

"the conference office reviewed the fourth down play in the first overtime of the Kentucky-Florida game and has determined the officials applied the proper mechanics and guidelines that are in place to determine when a flag should be thrown for delay of game. The back judge is responsible for delay of game calls. The procedure for the back judge is for his eyes to stay on the clock when it nears zero. When the clock hits zero, he immediately looks from the clock to the ball. If the ball is moving, there is no delay of game. If the ball is stationary, a delay of game penalty is called."

As overtime continued, Kentucky missed a crucial 41-yard field goal. Florida followed this up with a 1-yard rushing touchdown to end the game. Florida would finish the season 7–5 with a bowl win over East Carolina. Kentucky would finish 5–7, missing a bowl. This would be Florida head coach Will Muschamp's last Florida–Kentucky game, as he was fired at the end of the 2014 season.

==== 2017: Two blown coverages | Florida 28 – Kentucky 27 ====
The Gators escaped with a 28–27 win in Lexington, overcoming a 13-point fourth-quarter deficit to once again break the Wildcats' hearts. Florida took advantage of two blown Kentucky coverages during the game to complete wide open passes to help seal the comeback. The Wildcats still had a chance to win it late, but senior kicker Austin MacGinnis missed a 57-yard field goal as time expired. This would be the last of Florida's 31 consecutive wins over Kentucky dating back to 1987. This would also be Florida head coach Jim McElwain's last Florida–Kentucky game, as he and the university administration agreed to part ways amidst on-field struggles and off-field controversies five weeks later.

==== 2018: "The streak is broken!" | Kentucky 27 – Florida 16 ====
By a score of 27–16, the Kentucky Wildcats defeated the Florida Gators for the first time since 1986 (and for the first time in Gainesville since 1979). At that point, it was the longest active streak of one team beating another in FBS. Also notably, this was the first SEC opener Florida has lost since 2004, a 13-year streak. Kentucky put up over 450 offensive yards compared to Florida's 360 as the Wildcats overwhelmed a solid Gators defense. Both teams would go on to have successful seasons, with both teams making a bowl appearance (Kentucky making the Citrus Bowl and Florida making the Peach Bowl). This was Florida head coach Dan Mullen's first Florida–Kentucky game leading the Gators football program, as he had previously served as the Gators offensive coordinator from 2005 to 2008 under Urban Meyer.

==== 2021: Field storming | Kentucky 20 – Florida 13, Vacated win ====
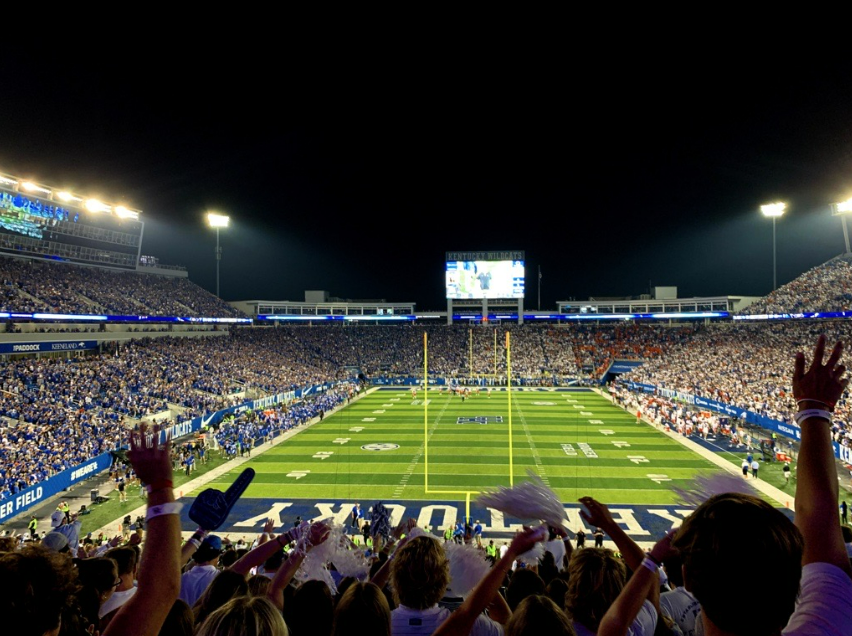
Kroger Field during the 2021 Florida–Kentucky game in which Kentucky would win 20–13.

The Kentucky Wildcats defeated the Florida Gators in Lexington for the first time since 1986. The game was notable for the atmosphere at Kroger Field, hosting 61,632 fans that disrupted the Florida offense. Throughout the game, Florida suffered 15 penalties, 8 of which were false start penalties. The game ended in dramatic fashion with Kentucky holding Florida on 7-straight goal line plays (Florida was able to get another set of downs after a 3rd and goal face mask call against Kentucky). At the completion of the game, Kentucky fans stormed the field, which resulted in a fine levied against the school by the SEC. In the following weeks after the game, Florida would continue to struggle, resulting in the firing of head coach Dan Mullen. Despite this, Florida would still make a bowl game, which they would lose. Kentucky would enjoy a successful season, winning 10 games including their bowl game. Mullen lost to Kentucky twice in his four seasons leading the Gators football program.

Kentucky vacated this win in August 2024, whereas Florida still accredits Kentucky's 2021 win to the record.

==== 2022: Kentucky goes back to back | Kentucky 26 – Florida 16 ====
The Wildcats defeated the Gators by a score of 26–16 to earn their second straight win over the Gators. The win marked the first time Kentucky defeated Florida in consecutive meetings since their wins in 1976 and 1977. The 2022 meeting was Florida head coach Billy Napier's first taste of the Florida–Kentucky football rivalry.

==== 2023: Ray's career day | Kentucky 33 – Florida 14 ====
The Kentucky Wildcats blew out the Florida Gators 33–14 in Lexington behind Kentucky running back Ray Davis's career game. In the game, Ray Davis rushed for 280 yards and scored 4-total touchdowns in a historic 33–14 victory for the Wildcats. 280 yards is the third most in Kentucky football history for a single game (behind Moe Williams's 299 yards in 1995 and Lynn Bowden Jr's 284 yards in 2019) and is the most by any single player in the history of the Florida–Kentucky football rivalry. Notably, this victory was the first time the Kentucky Wildcats had beaten the Florida Gators in three straight meetings since 1949–1951.

=== Game results ===
Florida victories	Kentucky victories	Tie games

No.	Date	Location	Winner	Score
1	November 29, 1917	Lexington, KY	Kentucky	52–0
2	October 23, 1926	Jacksonville, FL	Kentucky	18–13
3	October 15, 1927	Jacksonville, FL	Florida	27–6
4	December 5, 1931	Jacksonville, FL	Kentucky	7–2
5	November 9, 1935	Lexington, KY	Kentucky	15–6
6	October 24, 1936	Lexington, KY	Kentucky	7–0
7	December 4, 1937	Gainesville, FL	Florida	6–0
8	November 13, 1948	Lexington, KY	Kentucky	34–15
9	November 12, 1949	Tampa, FL	#14 Kentucky	35–0
10	November 4, 1950	Lexington, KY	#5 Kentucky	40–6
11	October 27, 1951	Gainesville, FL	#17 Kentucky	14–6
12	December 6, 1952	Gainesville, FL	#17 Florida	27–0
13	October 3, 1953	Lexington, KY	Kentucky	26–13
14	October 16, 1954	Gainesville, FL	Florida	21–7
15	October 22, 1955	Lexington, KY	Kentucky	10–7
16	October 6, 1956	Gainesville, FL	Kentucky	17–8
17	October 5, 1957	Lexington, KY	Florida	14–7
18	November 18, 1967	Gainesville, FL	Florida	28–12
19	November 16, 1968	Lexington, KY	Florida	16–14
20	November 15, 1969	Gainesville, FL	Florida	31–6
21	November 14, 1970	Tampa, FL	Florida	24–13
22	November 13, 1971	Gainesville, FL	Florida	35–24
23	November 18, 1972	Gainesville, FL	Florida	40–0
24	November 17, 1973	Gainesville, FL	Florida	20–18
25	November 16, 1974	Lexington, KY	Kentucky	41–24
26	November 15, 1975	Gainesville, FL	#14 Florida	48–7
27	November 13, 1976	Lexington, KY	Kentucky	28–9
28	November 12, 1977	Gainesville, FL	#7 Kentucky	14–7
29	November 18, 1978	Lexington, KY	Florida	18–16
30	November 17, 1979	Gainesville, FL	Kentucky	31–3
31	November 15, 1980	Lexington, KY	#20 Florida	17–15
32	November 14, 1981	Gainesville, FL	Florida	33–12
33	November 13, 1982	Lexington, KY	Florida	39–13
34	November 12, 1983	Gainesville, FL	#14 Florida	24–7
35	November 17, 1984	Lexington, KY	#5 Florida	25–17
36	November 16, 1985	Gainesville, FL	#11 Florida	15–13
37	November 15, 1986	Lexington, KY	Kentucky	10–3
38	November 14, 1987	Gainesville, FL	Florida	27–14
39	November 12, 1988	Lexington, KY	Florida	24–19
40	November 18, 1989	Gainesville, FL	Florida	38–28

No.	Date	Location	Winner	Score
41	November 17, 1990	Lexington, KY	#6 Florida	47–15
42	November 16, 1991	Gainesville, FL	#5 Florida	35–26
43	September 12, 1992	Gainesville, FL	#4 Florida	35–19
44	September 11, 1993	Lexington, KY	#7 Florida	24–20
45	September 10, 1994	Gainesville, FL	#2 Florida	73–7
46	September 9, 1995	Lexington, KY	#5 Florida	42–7
47	September 28, 1996	Gainesville, FL	#1 Florida	65–0
48	September 27, 1997	Lexington, KY	#1 Florida	55–28
49	September 26, 1998	Gainesville, FL	#8 Florida	51–35
50	September 25, 1999	Lexington, KY	#3 Florida	38–10
51	September 23, 2000	Gainesville, FL	#3 Florida	59–31
52	September 22, 2001	Lexington, KY	#2 Florida	44–10
53	September 28, 2002	Gainesville, FL	#7 Florida	41–34
54	September 27, 2003	Lexington, KY	#25 Florida	24–21
55	September 25, 2004	Gainesville, FL	#16 Florida	20–3
56	September 24, 2005	Lexington, KY	#5 Florida	49–28
57	September 23, 2006	Gainesville, FL	#5 Florida	26–7
58	October 20, 2007	Lexington, KY	#14 Florida	45–37
59	October 25, 2008	Gainesville, FL	#5 Florida	63–5
60	September 26, 2009	Lexington, KY	#1 Florida	41–7
61	September 25, 2010	Gainesville, FL	#9 Florida	48–14
62	September 24, 2011	Lexington, KY	#15 Florida	48–10
63	September 22, 2012	Gainesville, FL	#14 Florida	38–0
64	September 28, 2013	Lexington, KY	#20 Florida	28–7
65	September 13, 2014	Gainesville, FL	Florida	36–30^{3OT}
66	September 19, 2015	Lexington, KY	Florida	14–9
67	September 10, 2016	Gainesville, FL	Florida	45–7
68	September 23, 2017	Lexington, KY	#20 Florida	28–27
69	September 8, 2018	Gainesville, FL	Kentucky	27–16
70	September 14, 2019	Lexington, KY	#9 Florida	29–21
71	November 28, 2020	Gainesville, FL	#6 Florida	34–10
72	October 2, 2021	Lexington, KY	Kentucky^{*}	20–13
73	September 10, 2022	Gainesville, FL	#20 Kentucky	26–16
74	September 30, 2023	Lexington, KY	Kentucky	33–14
75	October 19, 2024	Gainesville, FL	Florida	48–20
76	November 8, 2025	Lexington, KY	Kentucky	38–7
77	November 14, 2026	Lexington, KY	Florida	21–14
Series: Florida leads 55–21
*Kentucky vacated all 2021 wins in August 2024.

== See also ==
- List of NCAA college football rivalry games
- Most consecutive NCAA football wins over one opponent
