= Antoine McClain =

American football player (born 1989)

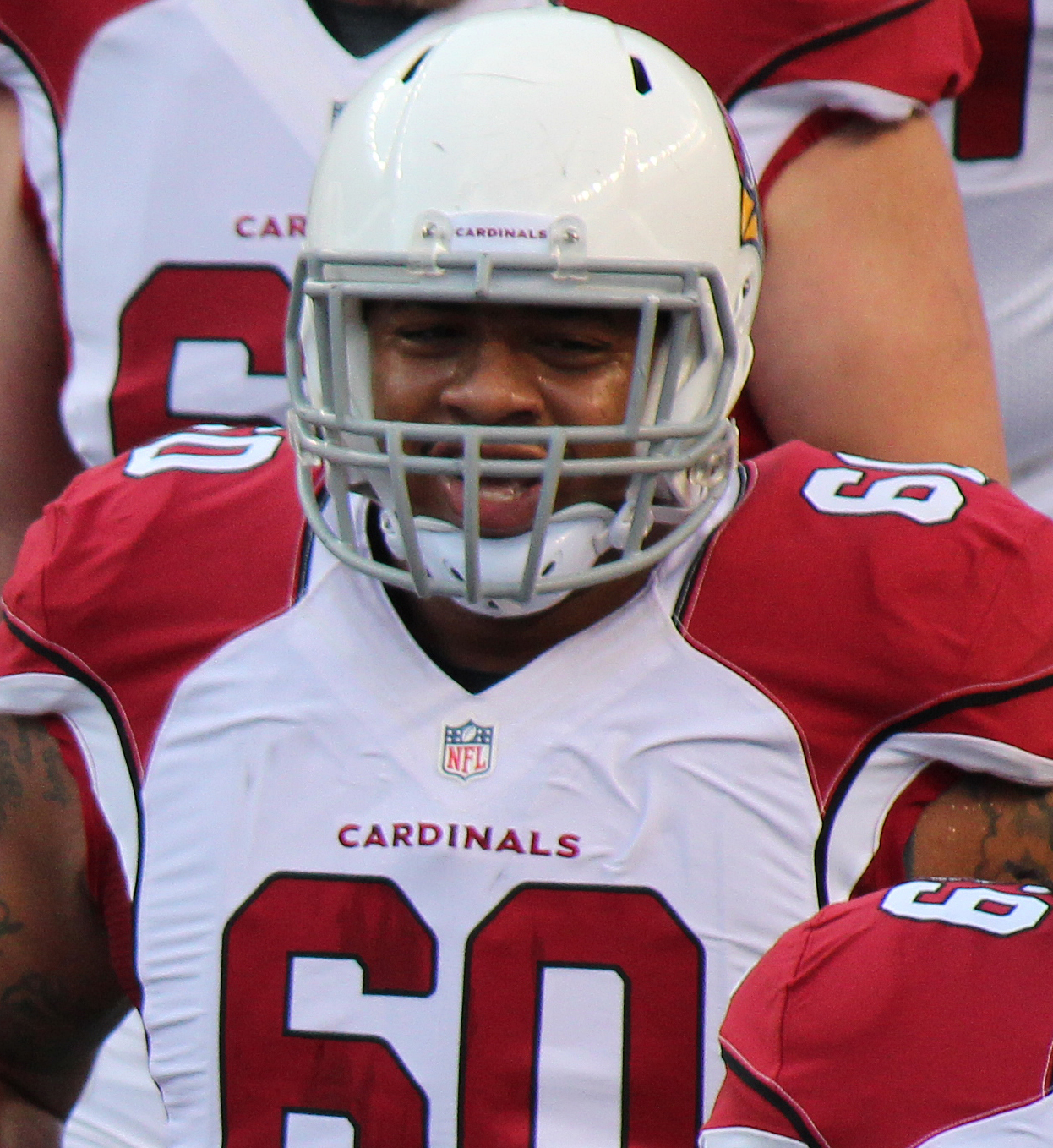
- McClain with the Arizona Cardinals in 2015

No. 74, 60
- Position: Offensive guard

Personal information
- Born: December 6, 1989 (age 36); Anniston, Alabama
- Listed height: 6 ft 5 in (1.96 m)
- Listed weight: 336 lb (152 kg)

Career information
- High school: Anniston (AL)
- College: Clemson
- NFL draft: 2012: undrafted

Career history
- Baltimore Ravens (2012–2013)*; Oakland Raiders (2013); Buffalo Bills (2013); New Orleans Saints (2014)*; Chicago Bears (2014)*; Arizona Cardinals (2015–2016)*; Baltimore Brigade (2017)
- * Offseason or practice squad member only

Awards and highlights
- Super Bowl champion (XLVII); ACC Academic Honor Roll (2011); Third-team All-ACC (2011); Music City Bowl champion (2009)
- Stats at Pro Football Reference

Antoine McClain (born December 6, 1989) is an American former football offensive guard. He initially signed with the Baltimore Ravens as an undrafted free agent in 2012. Originally from Anniston, Alabama, McClain played college football at Clemson University. He currently coaches offensive line for the Phoenix Phantoms of the Arizona Gridiron Football League.

== High school ==
Antoine McClain played his high school career at Anniston High School in Anniston, Alabama. He was named to the ASWA First-team All-State after his senior season. He participated in the ESPN/Under Armour All-American game.

College recruiting
Name	Hometown	School	Height	Weight	40^{‡}	Commit date
Antoine McClain; OT	Anniston, Alabama	Anniston HS	6 ft 6 in (1.98 m)	317 lb (144 kg)	5.4	Feb 6, 2008
Antoine McClain; OT	Recruit ratings: Scout: Rivals:					
Overall recruit ranking: Scout: 9 (OT), 11 (school) Rivals: 108 (national), 13 (OT), 7 (AL), 12 (school)
‡ Refers to 40-yard dash; Note: In many cases, Scout, Rivals, 247Sports, On3, and ESPN may conflict in their listings of height, weight and 40 time.; In these cases, the average was taken. ESPN grades are on a 100-point scale.; Sources: "2008 Clemson Football Commitment List". Rivals.; "2008 Clemson Football Recruiting Commits". Scout.; "Scout.com Team Recruiting Rankings". Scout.; "2008 Team Ranking". Rivals.com.

== College career ==
He played college football at Clemson. During his time in Clemson, he participated in 2,438 snaps and he played in 54 games and started 41 of them.

In his freshman year, he played in 13 games and was involved in 149 snaps.

In his sophomore year, he started 14 games. He was named the starting offensive guard and recorded 66 knockdown blocks.

In his junior year, he played in 13 games and started all 13 games and he was involved in 704 snaps. He was selected to the Third-team All-ACC and ACC All-Academic Honor Roll.

In his senior year, he played in 14 games and started all 14 games.

== Professional career ==
=== 2012 NFL Combine ===
Pre-draft measurables
Height	Weight	Arm length	Hand span	40-yard dash	10-yard split	20-yard split	20-yard shuttle	Three-cone drill	Vertical jump	Broad jump	Bench press
1 ft 6 in (0.46 m)	329 lb (149 kg)	34 3/8 in (0.87 m)	10 1/4 in (0.26 m)	5.57 s	1.92 s	3.19 s	4.82 s	8.13 s	27 in (0.69 m)	7 ft 7 in (2.31 m)	19 reps
All values from the NFL Scouting Combine

=== Baltimore Ravens ===
On April 30, 2012, after going undrafted in the 2012 NFL draft, he signed with the Baltimore Ravens. On August 31, 2012, he was released. On September 1, 2012, he re-signed with the team and was assigned to the practice squad. He was released by the Ravens on August 31, 2013.

=== Oakland Raiders ===
On September 1, 2013, the Oakland Raiders signed McClain. He was released by the Raiders on October 5, 2013.

=== Buffalo Bills ===
On October 7, 2013, McClain was claimed off waivers by the Buffalo Bills. He was released by the Bills on August 30, 2014.

=== New Orleans Saints ===
McClain was signed to the practice squad of the New Orleans Saints on September 1, 2014. He was released by the Saints on September 24, 2014.

=== Chicago Bears ===
McClain was signed to the practice squad of the Chicago Bears on November 12, 2014.

=== Arizona Cardinals ===
On December 31, 2014, McClain was signed by the Arizona Cardinals. On September 5, 2015, he was released by the Cardinals. On September 7, 2015, McClain was brought back to the team and was placed on the practice squad. On January 26, 2016, McClain signed a futures contract with the Arizona Cardinals. On September 3, 2016, he was released by the Cardinals.

=== Baltimore Brigade ===
On May 17, 2017, McClain was assigned to the Baltimore Brigade.
