= Brandon Maye =

American football player (born 1989)

No. 20, 9
- Position: Linebacker

Personal information
- Born: March 28, 1989 (age 37); Mobile, Alabama, U.S.
- Listed height: 6 ft 2 in (1.88 m)
- Listed weight: 235 lb (107 kg)

Career information
- High school: Davidson (Mobile, Alabama)
- College: Clemson Tigers (2007–2010); Mississippi State Bulldogs (2011)

Awards and highlights
- 2008 Freshman All-American (FWAA, CFN)

Brandon Maye (born March 28, 1989) is an American former football linebacker. Who played at Clemson University. He also attended Mississippi State University after graduating from Clemson.

== Early life ==
A native of Mobile, Alabama, Maye attended Davidson High School, where he had 120 tackles, 18 tackles for loss, five sacks, two interceptions, and five recovered fumbles as a senior. He was a first-team all-region pick and was selected to the Alabama-Mississippi All-Star game.

Considered a three-star recruit by Rivals.com, Maye was ranked No. 29 among the top prospects from Alabama. However, he was overlooked by both Alabama and Auburn. Maye eventually chose Clemson over Memphis, South Carolina, and Southern Miss.

== College career ==
After redshirting in 2007, Maye started twelve games for the Tigers in 2008, and recorded 87 tackles, the most by a Clemson freshman since Anthony Simmons had 150 in 1995. With his tackle total he also led all Atlantic Coast Conference freshmen in 2008. Maye also registered five tackles for loss, two sacks and nine quarterback pressures.

Maye subsequently earned All-Freshman honors, as he was named to FWAA′s Freshman All-America team and College Football News′ All-Freshman second team.

After finishing his sociology degree at Clemson, Maye transferred to Mississippi State to play his final season, while enrolling in MSU's sports administration graduate program.
