= Chris Chancellor =

American football player (born 1986)

No. 6, 38
- Position: Defensive back

Personal information
- Born: December 22, 1986 (age 39); Miami, Florida, U.S.
- Listed height: 5 ft 9 in (1.75 m)
- Listed weight: 180 lb (82 kg)

Career information
- High school: Miami Edison Senior (Miami, Florida)
- College: Clemson
- NFL draft: 2010: undrafted

Career history
- Cleveland Browns (2010)*; Jacksonville Jaguars (2010–2011)
- * Offseason or practice squad member only

Chris Chancellor (born December 22, 1986) is an American former football defensive back.

== Career ==
Chancellor played college football at Clemson from 2006 to 2009. He was signed as an undrafted free agent for the Cleveland Browns in 2010. Later that year, he was signed to the Jacksonville Jaguars. He left professional football in 2011.

== Personal life ==
He attended Miami Edison Senior High School in Miami, Florida with the late Jasper Howard who was a cornerback for the Connecticut Huskies football team. He is now a police officer in Clemson, South Carolina.
