= Jamie Harper =

American football player (born 1989)

No. 23
- Position: Running back

Personal information
- Born: September 11, 1989 (age 37); Waco, Texas, U.S.
- Listed height: 5 ft 11 in (1.80 m)
- Listed weight: 233 lb (106 kg)

Career information
- High school: Trinity Christian Academy (Jacksonville, Florida)
- College: Clemson
- NFL draft: 2011: 4th round, 130th overall pick

Career history
- Tennessee Titans (2011–2012)

Career NFL statistics
- Rushing attempts: 36
- Rushing yards: 74
- Rushing touchdowns: 4
- Receptions: 5
- Receiving yards: 40
- Stats at Pro Football Reference

Jamie Harper (born September 11, 1989) is an American former professional football player who was a running back in the National Football League (NFL). He was selected by the Tennessee Titans in the fourth round of the 2011 NFL draft. He played college football for the Clemson Tigers.

== Early life ==
Harper attended Trinity Christian Academy in Jacksonville, Florida, where he graduated in 2008. While at Trinity, Harper rushed for 1,437 yards and 19 touchdowns as a senior and 1,200 rushing yards and 17 touchdowns along with four receiving touchdowns as a junior. Rated as the No. 12 prospect in the nation by ESPN.com, No. 3 running back in the nation by ESPN.com, No. 5 running back and No. 35 prospect in the nation by Scout.com and No. 119 prospect in the nation by Rivals.com. He played in the ESPN/Under Armour All-American game and scored the winning touchdown on a pass with less than three minutes left in the game, topping it off with his signature front flip.

== College career ==
Harper fumbled on his first career carry at Clemson. During his recruiting pitch, Clemson coach Tommy Bowden promised Harper he would get the first carry of the season, regardless of the circumstances. Bowden had made similar promises while recruiting James Davis and C. J. Spiller.

== Professional career ==
Pre-draft measurables
Height	Weight	Arm length	Hand span	Wingspan	40-yard dash	10-yard split	20-yard split	20-yard shuttle	Three-cone drill	Vertical jump	Broad jump	Bench press
5 ft 11 3/8 in (1.81 m)	233 lb (106 kg)	30 3/8 in (0.77 m)	8 7/8 in (0.23 m)	6 ft 1 3/8 in (1.86 m)	4.46 s	1.58 s	2.65 s	4.39 s	6.94 s	36.5 in (0.93 m)	10 ft 3 in (3.12 m)	24 reps
All values from NFL Combine/Pro Day

After his junior season, Harper announced that he would forgo his senior season and enter the 2011 NFL draft. Harper was selected by the Tennessee Titans with the 130th pick in the fourth round of the 2011 NFL draft.

Jamie Harper signed a 4 year, $2,340,580 contract with the Titans, including a $300,580 signing bonus, $300,580 guaranteed, and an average annual salary of $585,145.
