= 2009 Music City Bowl =

2009 Gaylord Hotels Music City Bowl
- 12th Music City Bowl
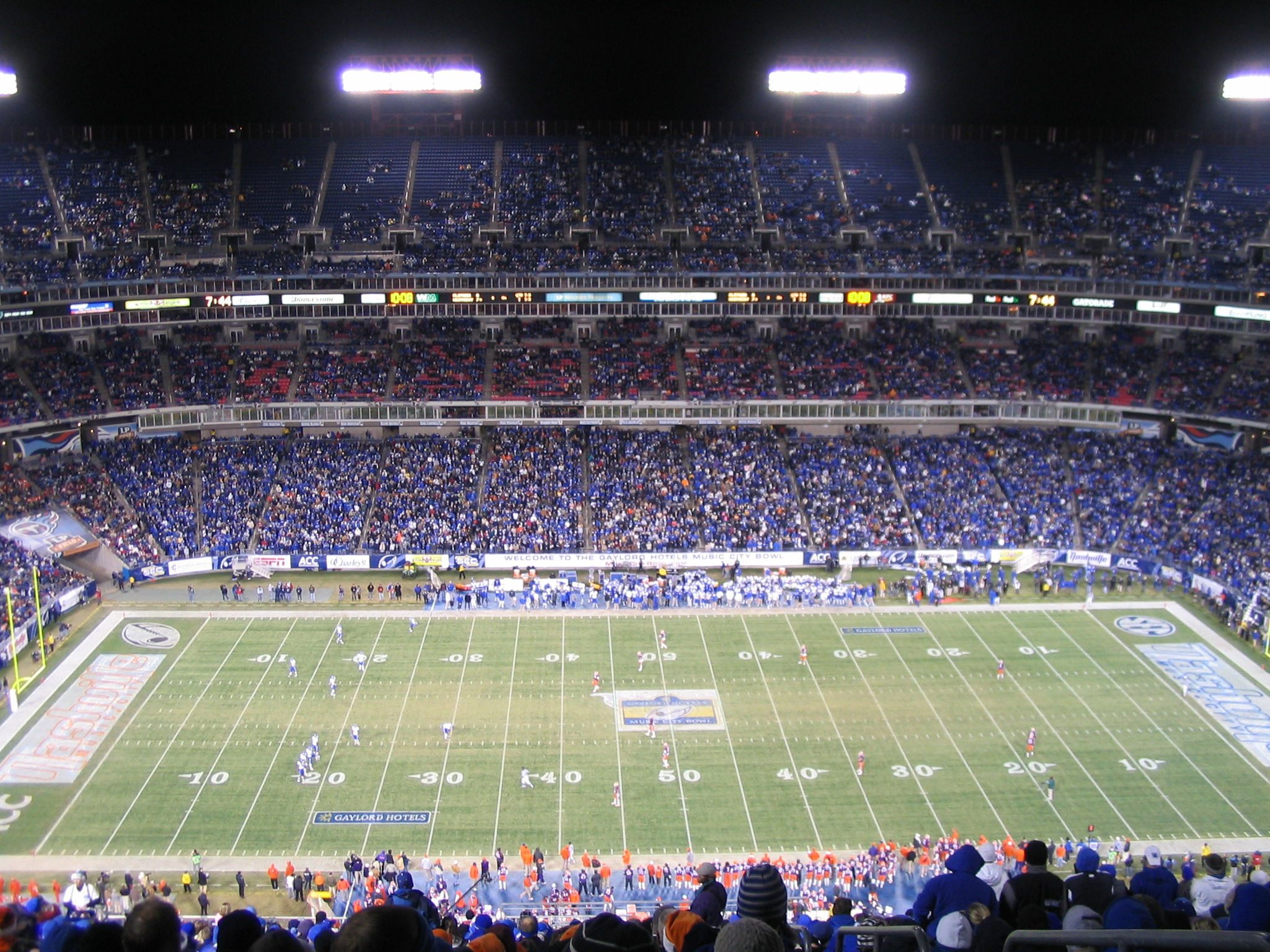
- Stadium during the first quarter
Kentucky Wildcats	Clemson Tigers
(7–5)	(8–5)
SEC	ACC
13	21
Head coach: Rich Brooks	Head coach: Dabo Swinney
	1	2	3	4	Total
Kentucky	7	3	3	0	13
Clemson	7	7	0	7	21
- Date: December 27, 2009
- Season: 2009
- Stadium: LP Field
- Location: Nashville, Tennessee
- MVP: RB C. J. Spiller (Clemson)
- Referee: Dennis Hennigan (Big East Conference)
- Attendance: 57,280
- Payout: US$1,700,000 per team

United States TV coverage
- Network: ESPN
- Announcers: Sean McDonough, Matt Millen, Holly Rowe

The 2009 Music City Bowl was the twelfth edition of the college football bowl game, and was played at LP Field in Nashville, Tennessee. The game was played on Sunday, December 27, 2009, and was telecast on ESPN. The ACC's Clemson Tigers defeated the SEC's Kentucky Wildcats 21–13. Sponsored by Gaylord Hotels, it was officially named the Gaylord Hotels Music City Bowl.

Music City Bowl officials originally wanted to select North Carolina as the ACC representative. This would have set up a contest between two traditional college basketball powers (the Wildcats and Tar Heels are first and third, respectively, in all-time college basketball wins). This plan came undone, however, when the Chick-fil-A, Gator, and Champs Sports Bowls all passed on Clemson, which lost the 2009 ACC Championship Game to Georgia Tech. This forced the Music City Bowl to take Clemson. Under the ACC's bowl selection rules in 2009, the conference title game loser could not fall below the Music City Bowl, which had the fifth pick among bowl-eligible ACC teams. The Tar Heels accepted a bid to the 2009 Meineke Car Care Bowl.

Since 2002, the name of the bowl game has been known as The Gaylord Hotels Music City Bowl, being named after its primary sponsor, Gaylord Hotels. The 2010 game marked the first time since then that a new company has taken over as title sponsor of the game, as Franklin American Mortgage will take over. Gaylord Hotels continued to be a major sponsor of the game.

This was Kentucky's third appearance in the bowl game in four years. It was Clemson's second appearance in the bowl. The game was a rematch of the 2006 game in which Kentucky won by a score of 28–20. The two teams had met a total of 12 previous times with Kentucky winning 8 of the previous games. Aside from the 2006 Music City Bowl, the schools also met in the 1993 Peach Bowl, a game won by Clemson 14–13.

== Game summary ==
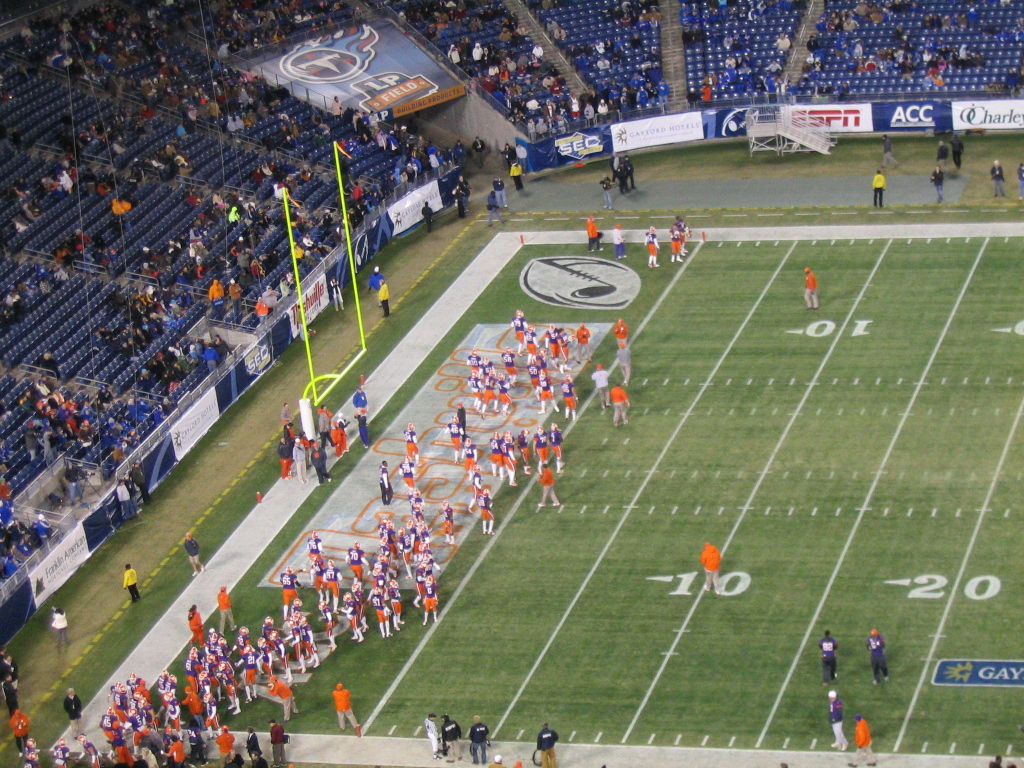
The Clemson Tigers take the field at the beginning of the game.

Clemson wore their secondary home Purple jerseys and Kentucky wore their white road jerseys.

Clemson senior and future NFL player, C. J. Spiller ended his final college game with a win. Spiller was named the game's MVP as he accounted for 172 all purpose yards and a rushing touchdown, the 51st touchdown of his college career. The Wildcats' only TD came on their opening drive when freshman quarterback Morgan Newton found Chris Matthews in the end zone for a 17-yard TD pass and a 7-0 lead. Clemson played excellent defense throughout the contest only allowing Kentucky to 277 total yards of offense. After the game 68-year-old Kentucky coach Rich Brooks stated that there was about an 80 percent chance that the game would be his last at Kentucky, which it subsequently proved to be, as he announced his retirement the next week.

Weather was a significant factor in the game's play. The game time temperature was a chilly 38 degrees and steadily dropped throughout the night. Winds gusted up to 22 mph and not only affected the kicking game and strategy for both teams but also made the temperature feel as if it were in the low 20 degree range. At one point Clemson kicker Richard Jackson, who had kicked three field goals in the regular season from over 50 yards, lined up for a 44-yard field goal. The ball hung in the air when kicked and ended up falling about eight yards short of the goal post.

=== Scoring summary ===
Scoring Play	Score
1st Quarter
UK - Chris Matthews 17-yard pass from Morgan Newton (Lones Seiber kick), 10:08	UK 7–0
CLM - Jacoby Ford 32-yard pass from Kyle Parker (Richard Jackson kick), 0:16	TIE 7–7
2nd Quarter
UK - Lones Seiber 39 yard, 7:29	UK 10–7
CLM - Jamie Harper 1-yard rush (Richard Jackson kick), 5:19	CLM 14–10
3rd Quarter
UK - Lones Seiber 44 yard, 10:13	CLM 14–13
4th Quarter
CLM - C. J. Spiller 8-yard rush (Richard Jackson kick), 10:14	CLM - 21–13
