= 2010 Liberty Bowl =

2010 Liberty Bowl can refer to:

- 2010 Liberty Bowl (January), played as part of the 2009–10 college football bowl season between the Arkansas Razorbacks and East Carolina Pirates.
- 2010 Liberty Bowl (December), played as part of the 2010–11 college football bowl season between the Georgia Bulldogs and UCF Knights.
