= 2009 Tulsa Golden Hurricane football team =

American college football season

2009 Tulsa Golden Hurricane football
- Conference: Conference USA
- West Division
- Record: 5–7 (3–5 C-USA)
- Head coach: Todd Graham (3rd season)
- Offensive coordinator: Herb Hand (3rd season)
- Offensive scheme: Spread
- Defensive coordinator: Keith Patterson (4th season)
- Co-defensive coordinators: Paul Randolph (3rd season); Ron West (1st season)
- Base defense: 3–3–5
- Home stadium: Skelly Field at H. A. Chapman Stadium

2009 Conference USA football standings
	Conf.			Overall
Team	W		L	W		L
East Division
East Carolina x$	7	–	1	9	–	5
UCF	6	–	2	8	–	5
Southern Miss	5	–	3	7	–	6
Marshall	4	–	4	7	–	6
UAB	4	–	4	5	–	7
Memphis	1	–	7	2	–	10
West Division
Houston xy	6	–	2	10	–	4
SMU x	6	–	2	8	–	5
Tulsa	3	–	5	5	–	7
UTEP	3	–	5	4	–	8
Rice	2	–	6	2	–	10
Tulane	1	–	7	3	–	9
Championship: East Carolina 38, Houston 32
$ – Conference champion; x – Division champion/co-champions; y – Championship game participant; Rankings from AP Poll

The 2009 Tulsa Golden Hurricane football team represented the University of Tulsa in the 2009 NCAA Division I FBS football season. The Golden Hurricane, led by third-year head coach Todd Graham, played their home games at Skelly Field at H. A. Chapman Stadium. Tulsa finished the season 5–7, 3–5 in C-USA play and failed to become bowl eligible for the first time since 2004.

== Schedule ==
Date	Time	Opponent	Site	TV	Result	Attendance
September 4	7:00 pm	at Tulane	Superdome; New Orleans, LA	ESPN	W 37–13	27,638
September 12	7:00 pm	at New Mexico*	University Stadium; Albuquerque, NM	The Mtn.	W 44–10	30,051
September 19	2:30 pm	at No. 12 Oklahoma*	Gaylord Family Oklahoma Memorial Stadium; Norman, OK	FSN	L 0–45	84,803
September 26	6:00 pm	Sam Houston State*	Skelly Field at H. A. Chapman Stadium; Tulsa, OK		W 56–3	26,048
October 3	6:30 pm	at Rice	Rice Stadium; Houston, TX	CBSCS	W 27–10	11,420
October 14	7:00 pm	No. 5 Boise State*	Skelly Field at H. A. Chapman Stadium; Tulsa, OK	ESPN	L 21–28	30,000
October 21	7:00 pm	at UTEP	Sun Bowl; El Paso, TX	ESPN	L 24–28	37,368
October 31	1:00 pm	SMU^{†}	Skelly Field at H. A. Chapman Stadium; Tulsa, OK		L 13–27	21,714
November 7	6:30 pm	No. 13 Houston	Skelly Field at H. A. Chapman Stadium; Tulsa, OK	CBSCS	L 45–46	20,243
November 15	7:15 pm	East Carolina	Skelly Field at H. A. Chapman Stadium; Tulsa, OK	ESPN	L 17–44	17,453
November 21	6:00 pm	at Southern Miss	M. M. Roberts Stadium; Hattiesburg, MS		L 34–44	28,757
November 27	2:30 pm	Memphis	Skelly Field at H. A. Chapman Stadium; Tulsa, OK	CBSCS	W 33–30 ^{OT}	19,552
*Non-conference game; ^{†}Homecoming; Rankings from AP Poll released prior to the game; All times are in Central time

== Game summaries ==
=== Tulane ===
	1	2	3	4	Total
Tulsa Golden Hurricane	17	3	3	14	37
Tulane Green Wave	0	3	7	3	13

Tulsa opened the season with a trip to the Superdome to take on division rival Tulane, whom they had defeated 56–7 in 2008. Tulsa scored on their first three possessions to build up a 17–0 lead as Tulane's offense struggled in the first quarter. Tulane managed cut the deficit to 13 points late in the third quarter, but Damaris Johnson's 66-yard punt return for a score with twelve minutes to play ended their hopes of a comeback. Sophomore quarterback G.J. Kinne went 15 of 20 for 211 yards in his debut with the Golden Hurricane, throwing for one touchdown and running for another. Johnson also had a big night with 252 all-purpose yards including the punt-return touchdown. With the win, Tulsa improved to 5–1 overall against the Green Wave.

=== New Mexico ===
	1	2	3	4	Total
Tulsa Golden Hurricane	7	10	13	14	44
New Mexico Lobos	3	0	0	7	10

For their second game of the season, Tulsa traveled to Albuquerque for the second leg of a home-and-away series against New Mexico. The Lobos fared little better at home than they had in Tulsa the previous season, when they suffered a 56–14 defeat and lost starting quarterback Donovan Porterie to a season-ending knee injury. Tulsa was forced to punt on their first possession but regained the ball on the Lobos' 16 after a fumble by UNM punt returner Frankie Solomon. Charles Clay scored four plays later on a 1-yard run over the middle, giving the Golden Hurricane a lead they never relinquished. The Lobos responded with a field goal to make it 7–3 at the end of the first, but Tulsa scored 23 unanswered points in the second and third quarters to put the game out of reach. Kinne threw for 310 yards and four touchdowns and the Golden Hurricane racked up 489 yards of offense in the blowout.

=== Oklahoma ===
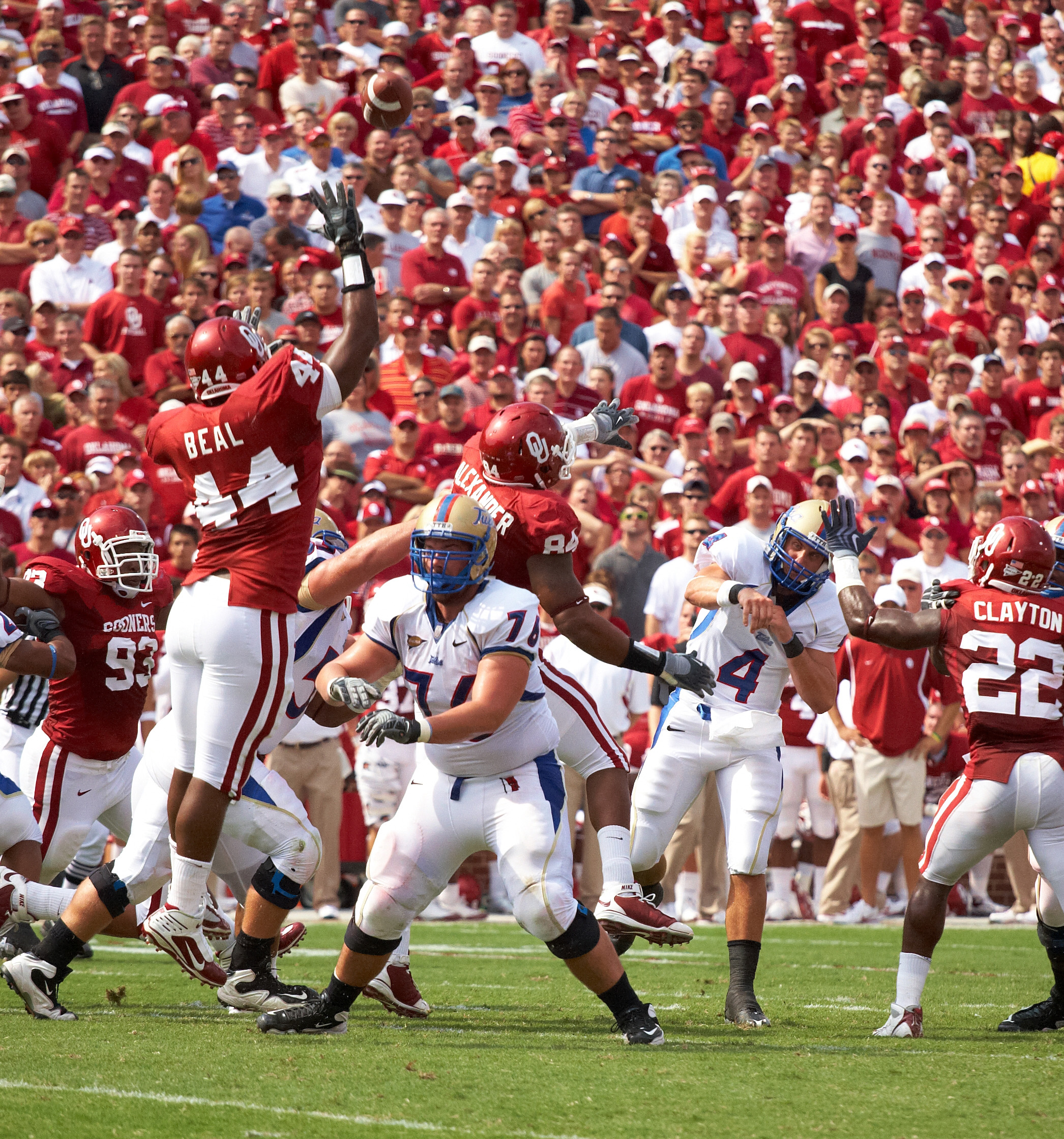
Quarterback G.J. Kinne in a game against the Oklahoma Sooners.

	1	2	3	4	Total
Tulsa Golden Hurricane	0	0	0	0	0
#12 Oklahoma Sooners	10	21	14	0	45

In week 3, the Golden Hurricane made the drive to Norman for their 24th meeting with the Sooners, whom they had beaten only once since 1979. Tulsa appeared to be off to a good start, intercepting Landry Jones on the first play of the game and taking 25 of their first 27 snaps in Oklahoma territory, but two costly red-zone turnovers and a missed 50-yard field goal kept them scoreless in the first half while the Sooners built an insurmountable 31–0 lead. The Golden Hurricane offense failed to threaten at all in the second half and Tulsa was shut out for the first time since 2004, falling to 7–16–1 overall against Oklahoma.

=== Sam Houston State ===
	1	2	3	4	Total
Sam Houston State Bearkats	3	0	0	0	3
Tulsa Golden Hurricane	14	21	21	0	56

For their home opener, the Golden Hurricane took on FCS opponent Sam Houston State in the first ever meeting of the two schools. The Bearkats moved the ball effectively in the first quarter but came away with only a field goal and were held to just 71 yards in the remainder of the game. Meanwhile, Tulsa scored on five of its first six possessions to put the game away by halftime. G.J. Kinne completed 12 of 15 passes for 264 yards and four touchdowns and Damaris Johnson accumulated 103 yards receiving in the rout.

=== Rice ===
	1	2	3	4	Total
Tulsa Golden Hurricane	7	3	10	7	27
Rice Owls	0	10	0	0	10

The Golden Hurricane traveled to Houston in week 5 to play their second conference opponent, a winless Rice team. Tulsa marched 80 yards on their first possession and Jamad Williams scored on a 6-yard run for the only points of the first quarter. Rice responded with a touchdown and a field goal in the second to take the lead, but Kevin Fitzpatrick kicked a 29-yard field goal just before halftime to tie the game at 10. In the second half, Kinne ran for one touchdown and threw for another as the Golden Hurricane scored 17 unanswered points to clinch the game. Kinne completed 21 of his 32 passes for 251 yards and Williams led the team in rushing with 72 yards on 14 carries. With the win, Tulsa tied the all-time series with Rice at 7–7–1.

=== Boise State ===
	1	2	3	4	Total
#6 Boise State Broncos	8	10	10	0	28
Tulsa Golden Hurricane	14	0	0	7	21

After a bye week, Tulsa returned home for a Wednesday-night matchup against Boise State, their highest-ranked opponent of the season. After recovering a muffed punt at their own 47, the Golden Hurricane got on the board first when Kinne pitched the ball to A.J. Whitmore, who completed a 53-yard trick pass to Damaris Johnson for the score. The Broncos responded with a touchdown and successful two-point conversion on their next drive, but Tulsa took the lead again when Kinne hit Trae Johnson from 15 yards at the end of the first quarter. Boise State scored 20 straight in the second and third quarters, but Tulsa threatened again in the fourth when Kinne completed two consecutive passes to Slick Shelley for 91 yards and a touchdown. After stopping Boise State twice, the Golden Hurricane got the ball back with just under two minutes to play for a final chance to tie the game. Three plays later, Kinne missed a wide-open Charles Clay on 4th and 6 and the Broncos were able to run out the clock. Boise State remained undefeated and improved to 5–0 against Tulsa with the win.

=== UTEP ===
	1	2	3	4	Total
Tulsa Golden Hurricane	0	7	10	7	24
UTEP Miners	13	0	0	15	28

Tulsa played their second straight Wednesday game on October 21, traveling to the Sun Bowl to take on a team they had defeated in a 77–35 shootout the previous season. This time, the Miners were better prepared, building up a 13–0 lead in the first quarter. However, the momentum appeared to shift in the second after Tulsa got on the board with a 19-yard run from A.J. Whitmore and two long UTEP drives were ended by interceptions. The Golden Hurricane continued to roll after halftime, scoring 17 straight to take an 11-point lead. Tulsa appeared set to cruise to another easy win, but the tide of the game turned again in the middle of the fourth quarter when UTEP finally got their offense back in gear and cut the deficit to 3 with a touchdown and two-point conversion. After Tulsa went three-and-out on their next possession, the Miners drove down the field again to score the game-winning touchdown with 29 seconds remaining.

=== SMU ===
	1	2	3	4	Total
SMU Mustangs	0	7	10	10	27
Tulsa Golden Hurricane	0	7	0	6	13

The Golden Hurricane followed up their loss to UTEP with a poor homecoming performance against SMU on October 31. The first three drives of the game ended in turnovers and neither offense was able to do anything in the first quarter. Backup quarterback Jacob Bower came on in the second to replace a struggling Kinne, who went 2 of 10 for 10 yards and two interceptions. Bower completed a pair of 28-yard passes on his first drive, enabling a 13-yard touchdown run by Charles Opeseyitan with nine minutes to go in the half. SMU answered with a touchdown of its own, and the teams entered the locker room tied at 7. After the break, the Mustangs scored 13 straight to take a 20–7 lead. Tulsa managed to reduce the deficit to 7 when Bower hit Jacob Collums from 13 yards out, but the extra point was blocked. The Golden Hurricane's next drive ended after Kinne reentered the game for a questionable 4th-and-18 pass attempt which was broken up. SMU was able to turn the mistake into a go-ahead touchdown with under two minutes remaining to seal the win.

=== Houston ===
	1	2	3	4	Total
Houston Cougars	14	10	10	12	46
Tulsa Golden Hurricane	14	7	17	7	45

On November 7, Houston's fourth field goal of the game came as time expired giving the 13th-ranked Cougars a 46–45 victory over the Tulsa Golden Hurricane in front of 20,243 fans at H.A. Chapman Stadium during a televised Saturday night game. Four turnovers, including two interceptions and two fumbles, and a 98-yard Houston kickoff return doomed the Hurricane. Tulsa's Charles Clay capped a 73-yard, 10-play touchdown drive with a one-yard run with 3:28 remaining in the game to put the Hurricane ahead 45–37. But the nation's top-ranked offense marched 61 yards in 13 plays in just 3:02 to close the gap to 45–43. The Cougars two-point conversion failed with just 0:21 on the clock, presumably giving the Hurricane a 45–43 victory. But, the Cougars recovered the subsequent onside kick at the Houston 39-yard line. Three plays later, Houston traveled to the Tulsa 34-yard line setting up the winning field goal. Tulsa's G.J. Kinne became the first quarterback in school history to pass for 300 yards and rush for 100 yards in the same game, as he finished with 334 passing yards and three TDs, and 100 rushing yards and one touchdown. Charles Clay scored four touchdowns, two rushing and two receiving for the Hurricane, while Damaris Johnson totaled a career-best 324 all-purpose yards. Houston totaled 695 total yards on a new Tulsa opponent record of 100 plays, while the Hurricane gained a season-best 534 total yards.

=== East Carolina ===
	1	2	3	4	Total
ECU Pirates	3	17	3	21	44
Tulsa Golden Hurricane	0	7	10	0	17

In a rematch of the previous season's C-USA championship game, the Pirates (6–4, 5–1) dominated on offense in the first half and then sealed the game with three defensive touchdowns in the fourth quarter during a rare Sunday night game at Chapman Stadium on November 15. Damaris Johnson, the nation's leader in all-purpose yardage, got the Golden Hurricane back in the game after the Pirates had built a 20-point lead in the first half. He returned a kickoff 57 yards and then had catches on back-to-back plays, the second going for 9 yards and a touchdown that brought Tulsa to 23–17 with 4 minutes left in the third quarter. East Carolina couldn't get its offense going again after amassing 401 yards in the first half, but G.J. Kinne's pass to Johnson was intercepted and returned for a touchdown to provide some extra cushion. Tulsa got the ball to the 7 on its ensuing possession, but Kinne's pass on fourth-and-6 bounced off of nose guard Linval Joseph's helmet and fell incomplete. An ECU defender then picked off another Kinne pass and brought it back 57 yards to put the game away with 2:23 remaining. The Pirates added a 49-yard return of a Kinne fumble 46 seconds later. Kinne finished with 236 yards on 23-for-46 passing with two touchdowns and the two interceptions. Johnson had 14 catches for 135 yards. Ryan Fitzpatrick also connected on a career-long 51-yard field goal.

=== Southern Miss ===
	1	2	3	4	Total
Tulsa Golden Hurricane	14	14	0	6	34
Southern Miss Golden Eagles	6	28	10	0	44

In week 12, the 4–6 Golden Hurricane traveled to Hattiesburg to play a must-win game for bowl eligibility. Charles Clay had a career-best 142 yards receiving with two touchdown catches and two rushing touchdowns, but the Golden Eagles prevailed to keep Tulsa out of the postseason for the first time since 2004. Southern Miss scored on their first play from scrimmage and did not let up, racking up 28 more points in the second quarter including a 42-yard fumble return. Meanwhile, Clay ran for two touchdowns and caught a 3-yard touchdown pass from G.J. Kinne, who also ran for a touchdown. After several lead changes, the halftime score was 34–28 in favor of Southern Miss. In the third quarter, the Golden Hurricane offense fell flat while Southern Miss scored 10 unanswered points to seal the win. Tulsa managed another touchdown drive near the end of the fourth quarter but the two-point conversion attempt failed, giving the Golden Eagles a 10-point margin of victory. Kinne completed 32 of 46 passes for a career-high 396 yards with two touchdowns and one interception while Damaris Johnson had 17 catches for 196 yards, also a career-high.

=== Memphis ===
	1	2	3	4	OT	Total
Memphis Tigers	7	3	7	13	0	30
Tulsa Golden Hurricane	7	3	13	7	3	33

Tulsa closed out the season with a home game against the 2-9 Memphis Tigers. The game was close throughout and the teams were tied at 30 at the end of regulation after Kinne completed a 2-yard TD pass to Trae Johnson with 32 seconds remaining. In overtime, James Lockett intercepted a pass from Tigers quarterback Arkelon Hall to set up Kevin Fitzpatrick's game-winning field goal. Kinne went 27 of 40 for 268 yards and three touchdowns with one interception. He was also Tulsa's leading rusher with 57 yards.
