= 2009 East Carolina Pirates football team =

American college football season

2009 East Carolina Pirates football

C-USA champion C-USA East Division champion

C-USA Championship Game, W 38–32 vs. Houston

Liberty Bowl, L 17–20 ^{OT} vs. Arkansas
- Conference: Conference USA
- East
- Record: 9–5 (7–1 C-USA)
- Head coach: Skip Holtz (5th season)
- Co-offensive coordinators: Steve Shankweiler (5th season); Todd Fitch (3rd season)
- Offensive scheme: Multiple
- Defensive coordinator: Greg Hudson (5th season)
- Base defense: 4–3
- Home stadium: Dowdy–Ficklen Stadium

2009 Conference USA football standings
	Conf.			Overall
Team	W		L	W		L
East Division
East Carolina x$	7	–	1	9	–	5
UCF	6	–	2	8	–	5
Southern Miss	5	–	3	7	–	6
Marshall	4	–	4	7	–	6
UAB	4	–	4	5	–	7
Memphis	1	–	7	2	–	10
West Division
Houston xy	6	–	2	10	–	4
SMU x	6	–	2	8	–	5
Tulsa	3	–	5	5	–	7
UTEP	3	–	5	4	–	8
Rice	2	–	6	2	–	10
Tulane	1	–	7	3	–	9
Championship: East Carolina 38, Houston 32
$ – Conference champion; x – Division champion/co-champions; y – Championship game participant; Rankings from AP Poll

The 2009 East Carolina Pirates football team represented East Carolina University in the 2009 NCAA Division I FBS football season and played their home games in Dowdy–Ficklen Stadium. The team was coached by Skip Holtz, who was in his fifth and final year with the program. The 2009 Pirates were defending their first ever Conference USA Football Championship.

The Pirates finished the season 9–5, 7–1 in CUSA play, winning the East Division in their final regular season game against the Southern Mississippi Golden Eagles 25-20, and won their second consecutive CUSA Championship Game 38–32 against the Houston Cougars in Dowdy–Ficklen Stadium. The Pirates were invited to their second consecutive Liberty Bowl where they were defeated by Arkansas 20–17 in overtime.

== Schedule ==
Date	Time	Opponent	Site	TV	Result	Attendance	Source
September 5	12:00 pm	No. 1 (FCS) Appalachian State*	Dowdy–Ficklen Stadium; Greenville, NC	MASN/WITN-TV	W 29–24	43,279	
September 12	3:30 pm	at West Virginia*	Milan Puskar Stadium; Morgantown, WV	ESPN360	L 20–35	59,216	
September 19	12:00 pm	at No. 24 North Carolina*	Kenan Memorial Stadium; Chapel Hill, NC	ESPN2	L 17–31	58,000	
September 26	3:30 pm	UCF	Dowdy–Ficklen Stadium; Greenville, NC	BHSN/WITN-TV	W 19–14	43,210	
October 3	12:00 pm	at Marshall	Joan C. Edwards Stadium; Huntington, WV	CBSCS	W 21–17	26,814	
October 10	8:00 pm	at SMU	Gerald J. Ford Stadium; Dallas, TX	MASN/WITN-TV	L 21–28	13,626	
October 17	3:30 pm	Rice^{†}	Dowdy–Ficklen Stadium; Greenville, NC	MASN	W 49–13	43,023	
October 27	8:00 pm	at Memphis	Liberty Bowl Memorial Stadium; Memphis, TN	ESPN2	W 38–19	4,117	
November 5	7:30 pm	No. 22 Virginia Tech*	Dowdy–Ficklen Stadium; Greenville, NC	ESPN	L 3–16	43,569	
November 15	8:15 pm	at Tulsa	Skelly Field at H. A. Chapman Stadium; Tulsa, OK	ESPN	W 44–17	17,453	
November 21	3:30 pm	UAB	Dowdy–Ficklen Stadium; Greenville, NC	MASN/WITN-TV	W 37–21	43,056	
November 28	1:30 pm	Southern Miss	Dowdy–Ficklen Stadium; Greenville, NC	CBSCS	W 25–20	43,006	
December 5	12:00 pm	No. 18 Houston	Dowdy–Ficklen Stadium; Greenville, NC (C-USA Championship Game)	ESPN2	W 38–32	33,048	
January 2	5:30 pm	vs. Arkansas	Liberty Bowl Memorial Stadium; Memphis, TN (AutoZone Liberty Bowl)	ESPN	L 17–20 ^{OT}	62,742	
*Non-conference game; ^{†}Homecoming; Rankings from AP Poll released prior to the game; All times are in Eastern time

== Before the season ==
=== Recruiting ===
College recruiting information (2009)
Name	Hometown	School	Height	Weight	40^{‡}	Commit date
Jimmy Booth; DT	Greenville, North Carolina	J.H. Rose High School	6 ft 2 in (1.88 m)	288 lb (131 kg)		Jul 22, 2008
Jimmy Booth; DT	Recruit ratings: Scout: Rivals: (40)					
Michael Brooks; DT	Yanceyville, North Carolina	Bartlett-Yancey High School	6 ft 3 in (1.91 m)	280 lb (130 kg)	5.1	Apr 28, 2008
Michael Brooks; DT	Recruit ratings: Scout: Rivals: (40)					
Jordan Davis; OL	Fort Walton Beach, Florida	Choctawhatchee High School	6 ft 3 in (1.91 m)	290 lb (130 kg)	5.15	Feb 4, 2009
Jordan Davis; OL	Recruit ratings: Scout: Rivals: (40)					
Michael Dobson; S	Mount Airy, North Carolina	Mount Airy High School	6 ft 0 in (1.83 m)	185 lb (84 kg)	4.4	Aug 19, 2008
Michael Dobson; S	Recruit ratings: Scout: Rivals: (80)					
Max Hay; OT	Burlington, New Jersey	Burlington City High School	6 ft 7 in (2.01 m)	310 lb (140 kg)		Sep 15, 2008
Max Hay; OT	Recruit ratings: Scout: Rivals: (40)					
Ty Holmes; S	Lexington, North Carolina	Lexington High School	6 ft 1 in (1.85 m)	213 lb (97 kg)		Jun 25, 2008
Ty Holmes; S	Recruit ratings: Scout: Rivals: (40)					
Torrance Hunt; CB	Durham, North Carolina	Charles E. Jordan Senior High School	5 ft 8 in (1.73 m)	160 lb (73 kg)	4.4	Jun 16, 2008
Torrance Hunt; CB	Recruit ratings: Scout: Rivals: (76)					
Perry James; CB	Mocksville, North Carolina	Davie High School	6 ft 0 in (1.83 m)	180 lb (82 kg)	4.4	Dec 20, 2008
Perry James; CB	Recruit ratings: Scout: Rivals: (40)					
Rio Johnson; QB	Tyrone, Georgia	Sandy Creek High School	6 ft 2 in (1.88 m)	185 lb (84 kg)	4.72	Jun 18, 2008
Rio Johnson; QB	Recruit ratings: Scout: Rivals: (74)					
Justin Jones; TE	Conyers, Georgia	Heritage High School	6 ft 6.5 in (1.99 m)	234.5 lb (106.4 kg)	4.8	Jan 30, 2009
Justin Jones; TE	Recruit ratings: Scout: Rivals: (78)					
Lamar McLendon; OLB	Fayetteville, North Carolina	Seventy-First Senior High School	6 ft 0 in (1.83 m)	200 lb (91 kg)		May 22, 2008
Lamar McLendon; OLB	Recruit ratings: Scout: Rivals: (40)					
Matt Milner; DE	Raleigh, North Carolina	Cardinal Gibbins High School	6 ft 4 in (1.93 m)	235 lb (107 kg)	4.6	Sep 7, 2008
Matt Milner; DE	Recruit ratings: Scout: Rivals: (78)					
Zico Pasut; TE	Charlotte, North Carolina	Ardrey Kell High School	6 ft 3 in (1.91 m)	235 lb (107 kg)	4.65	Sep 11, 2008
Zico Pasut; TE	Recruit ratings: Scout: Rivals: (73)					
Marke Powell; LB	Troy, North Carolina	West Montgomery High School	6 ft 3 in (1.91 m)	198 lb (90 kg)		Feb 4, 2009
Marke Powell; LB	Recruit ratings: Scout: Rivals: (40)					
Mike Price; WR	New Bern, North Carolina	New Bern High School	6 ft 1 in (1.85 m)	165 lb (75 kg)		Jul 17, 2008
Mike Price; WR	Recruit ratings: Scout: Rivals: (40)					
Korey Reynolds; TE	Senatobia, Mississippi	Northwest Mississippi Community College	6 ft 2 in (1.88 m)	240 lb (110 kg)		Jan 27, 2009
Korey Reynolds; TE	Recruit ratings: Scout: Rivals: (40)					
Giavanni Ruffin; RB	Visalia, California	College of the Sequoias	6 ft 1 in (1.85 m)	215 lb (98 kg)	4.4	Jan 10, 2009
Giavanni Ruffin; RB	Recruit ratings: Scout: Rivals: (40)					
Will Simmons; OL	Ahoskie, North Carolina	Hertford County High School	6 ft 5 in (1.96 m)	280 lb (130 kg)		Jul 11, 2008
Will Simmons; OL	Recruit ratings: Scout: Rivals: (69)					
DaMonte Terry; RB	Laurinburg, North Carolina	Scotland County High School	6 ft 1 in (1.85 m)	203 lb (92 kg)	4.5	Jul 3, 2008
DaMonte Terry; RB	Recruit ratings: Scout: Rivals: (74)					
Reese Wiggins; WR	Durham, North Carolina	Southern Durham High School	5 ft 11 in (1.80 m)	181 lb (82 kg)	4.66	Dec 18, 2008
Reese Wiggins; WR	Recruit ratings: Scout: Rivals: (73)					
Overall recruit ranking: Scout: 82 Rivals: 94
‡ Refers to 40-yard dash; Note: In many cases, Scout, Rivals, 247Sports, On3, and ESPN may conflict in their listings of height, weight and 40 time.; In these cases, the average was taken. ESPN grades are on a 100-point scale.; Sources: "East Carolina 2009 Football Commitments". Rivals.; "Football Recruiting Commits". Scout.; "2009 Player commits". ESPN.; "Scout.com Team Recruiting Rankings". Scout.; "2009 Team Ranking". Rivals.com.

=== Purple/Gold Spring Game ===
	1	2	3	4	Total
Pirates	0	10	0	0	10
ECU	10	0	14	7	31

The annual Purple/Gold Spring Game was held in the spring during the PirateFest and Pigskin Pigout weekend activities on April 18 in downtown Greenville, NC and put the "Pirates" team led by Redshirt Freshman Quarterback Josh Jordan against the "ECU" team led by Senior Quarterback Patrick Pinkney. The ECU team defeated the Pirates team 31-10.

== Game summaries ==
=== Appalachian State ===
	1	2	3	4	Total
Mountaineers	0	7	0	17	24
Pirates	17	10	2	0	29

The Pirates renewed their rivalry with their former Southern Conference opponent for the first time since 1979. The Mountaineers led the all-time series 19-10, but the two schools had only played once since the split of Division I college football, with the Pirates defeating the Mountaineers 38-21 in 1979. This marked the first time since 2001 that the Pirates have played a school from the Football Championship Subdivision. After being dominated in the first half, Appalachian State staged a comeback but fell short after a sack and a blocked pass with seconds left in the 4th Quarter. ECU would hold on to win 29-24, improving their record against the Mountaineers to 11-19.

=== West Virginia ===
	1	2	3	4	Total
Pirates	10	10	0	0	20
Mountaineers	7	14	7	7	35

The Pirates went to Morgantown, WV to take on the 2008 Meineke Car Care Bowl Champion West Virginia Mountaineers, who remained undefeated at home in this series and led the all-time record 17-3. Last year, East Carolina blew out West Virginia 24-3 in Greenville. After going up 10-0 early in the first half, the Pirates would enter the second half trailing by 1, but the Mountaineers would pull ahead to win 35-20, improving their record to 18-3.

=== North Carolina ===
	1	2	3	4	Total
Pirates	7	7	0	3	17
Tar Heels	7	14	3	7	31

The Pirates travel to Chapel Hill, NC to face their in-state rival North Carolina. In 2007, the Pirates beat the Tar Heels with a last second field goal to win the game 34-31. The Tar Heels lead the all-time series, 8-2-1.

=== UCF ===
	1	2	3	4	Total
Knights	7	0	0	7	14
Pirates	3	7	3	6	19

The Pirates face the 2007 Conference USA champion UCF Knights in Greenville, NC. Last year, the Pirates beat the Knights in Orlando, FL 13-10 in overtime and lead the all-time series 7-1.

=== Marshall ===
	1	2	3	4	Total
Pirates	7	7	7	0	21
Thundering Herd	0	7	10	0	17

The Pirates head back to West Virginia to face the Thundering Herd of Marshall. The Pirates won last year 19-16 in Greenville, NC after one overtime and lead the all-time series 7-3. In 2007, the Herd spoiled the Pirates' hopes in Huntington for a spot in the Conference USA championship.

=== SMU ===
	1	2	3	4	Total
Pirates	0	7	7	7	21
Mustangs	0	7	14	7	28

The Pirates face the Mustangs of Southern Methodist in Dallas, TX. The last time the two schools played was in Greenville, NC in 2006, where the Pirates won 38-21. East Carolina has won both games played in this series.

=== Rice ===
	1	2	3	4	Total
Owls	3	7	3	0	13
Pirates	14	14	0	21	49

The Pirates face the 2008 Texas Bowl Champion Rice Owls at home. The two teams are tied in the series 1-1 after the Owls spoiled the Pirates' hopes to clinch the Conference USA East Division and participate in the Conference USA Football Championship in 2006.

=== Memphis ===
	1	2	3	4	Total
Pirates	14	7	14	3	38
Tigers	3	7	3	6	19

The Pirates travel to Liberty Bowl Memorial Stadium in Memphis, TN to face the Tigers of Memphis. The Pirates won last year in Greenville, NC 30-10 and lead the all-time series 11-6.

=== Virginia Tech ===
	1	2	3	4	Total
Hokies	6	7	0	3	16
Pirates	0	3	0	0	3

For the first time since 2000, the 2009 Orange Bowl Champion Hokies make the trip to Greenville, NC. Last year, the Hokies and Pirates squared off in Bank of America Stadium in Charlotte, NC, with the Pirates winning 27-22 after a Pontiac Game Changing Performance nominated blocked punt was returned by T.J. Lee. The Hokies lead the all time series 9-5.

=== Tulsa ===
	1	2	3	4	Total
Pirates	3	17	3	21	44
Golden Hurricane	0	7	10	0	17

In a rematch of the 2008 Conference USA Football Championship, the Pirates travel to Tulsa, OK to face the Golden Hurricane. Last year, the Pirates defeated the Golden Hurricane 27-24. Tulsa leads the all-time series 5-3.

=== UAB ===
	1	2	3	4	Total
Blazers	3	0	3	15	21
Pirates	14	9	7	7	37

The Pirates face the Blazers at home

The Pirates faced the UAB Blazers at home in Dowdy–Ficklen Stadium. In 2008 the Pirates defeated the Blazers in Birmingham, AL for the first time in this series' history. The two schools are tied in the all-time series 4-4.

=== Southern Miss ===
	1	2	3	4	Total
Golden Eagles	7	0	7	6	20
Pirates	3	14	0	8	25

The Pirates will be hosting the rival Golden Eagles of Southern Miss. Of the 34 games played in this series, the Pirates have only won 8. Last year, the Golden Eagles beat the Pirates 21-3 in Hattiesburg, MS.

=== 2009 Conference USA Championship ===
	1	2	3	4	Total
Cougars	7	12	0	13	32
Pirates	7	7	10	14	38

=== 2010 AutoZone Liberty Bowl ===
	1	2	3	4	OT	Total
Razorbacks	0	0	17	0	3	20
Pirates	0	10	7	0	0	17

== Coaching staff ==
Position	Name	Years at ECU	Alma Mater
Head Coach:	Skip Holtz	5th	Notre Dame '86
Offensive coordinator/ Quarterbacks Coach:	Todd Fitch	3rd	Ohio Wesleyan '86
Defensive coordinator Linebacker Coach:	Greg Hudson	4th	Notre Dame '90
Offensive coordinator Offensive linemen coach:	Steve Shankweiler	5th(15th overall)	Davidson '74
Special teams coordinator:	John Gutekunst	1st	Duke '67
Assistant head coach/ Defensive backs Coach	Rick Smith	5th	Florida State '71
Director of strength & conditioning	Michael Golden	4th	Central Connecticut State '92
Defensive end Coach	Vernon Hargreaves	3rd	Connecticut '86
Wide receiver Coach/ Recruiting coordinator	Donnie Kirkpatrick	5th	Lenoir-Rhyne '82
Tight ends coach:	Phil Petty	5th	South Carolina '01
Director of HS football relations	Harold Robinson	6th	East Carolina '72
Defensive tackle Coach	Thomas Roggeman	5th	Notre Dame '85
Running backs Coach	Junior Smith	5th	East Carolina '97
Director of operations	Clifford Snow	5th	Central Connecticut State '83
Director of football administration	Reed Case	1st	Ohio ‘95
Administrative Assistant to Coach Holtz	Ryan Mills	6th	North Carolina '02
Administrative Assistant	Ann Coyle	3rd	East Carolina '06
Offensive staff assistant coach	Dwayne Ledford	2nd	East Carolina '00
Defensive staff assistant coach	Chris Bland	1st	Elon '08

== Awards and honors ==
- Conference USA Special Teams Player-of-the-Year: Dwayne Harris, Jr. KR

=== Weekly honors ===
- Oct. 19 Conference USA Special Teams Player-of-the-Week - Dwayne Harris, Jr. KR
- Nov. 16 Conference USA Defensive Player-of-the-Week - Emanuel Davis, So. DB
- Nov. 23 Conference USA Special Teams Player-of-the-Week - Dwayne Harris, Jr. KR
- Nov. 30 Conference USA Special Teams Player-of-the-Week - Ben Hartman, Sr. K

=== Teams ===
- ESPN The Magazine University CoSIDA Academic All-America team - Sean Allen, Sr. OL
- Sporting News Second-Team All America - Matt Dodge, Sr. P
- Rivals.com Third-Team All America - Matt Dodge, Sr. P
- Sports Illustrated Second-Team All-America - Matt Dodge, Sr. P
- CollegeFootballNews Second-Team All-America - Matt Dodge, Sr. P
- Phil Steele Magazine Fourth-Team All America - Matt Dodge, Sr. P

1st Team All C-USA
- Sean Allen, Sr. OL
- Emanuel Davis, So. DB
- Matt Dodge, Sr. P
- Van Eskridge, Sr. DB
- Dwayne Harris, Jr. WR
- Linval Joseph, Jr. DL
- C.J. Wilson, Sr. DL

2nd Team All C-USA
- Terence Campbell, Sr. OL
- Dwayne Harris, Jr. KR
- Ben Hartman, Sr. K
- Nick Johnson, Sr. LB

C-USA Team honorable mentions
- Jeremy Chambliss, Sr. LB
- Dominique Lindsay, Sr. RB
- Levin Neal, Sr. DB
- Scotty Robinson, Sr. DL
- Jay Ross, Sr. DL
- D.J. Scott, Jr. OL
- Travis Simmons, Jr. DB
- William Smith, So. LS
- Willie Smith, Jr. OL

C-USA All Freshman Team
- Mic'hael Brooks - DL

C-USA All Academic Team
- Sean Allen - Sr. C
- Patrick Pinkney - Sr. QB

== NFL draft picks ==
- Linval Joseph - Round 2: 14th (46th overall) - New York Giants
- Matt Dodge - Round 7: 14th (221st overall) - New York Giants
- C.J. Wilson - Round 7: 23rd (230th overall) - Green Bay Packers
