= 2009 St. Petersburg Bowl =

2009 St. Petersburg Bowl presented by Beef 'O' Brady's
- 2nd St. Petersburg Bowl
UCF Knights	Rutgers Scarlet Knights
(8–4)	(8–4)
C-USA	Big East
24	45
Head coach: George O'Leary	Head coach: Greg Schiano
	1	2	3	4	Total
UCF	7	10	0	7	24
Rutgers	14	14	10	7	45
- Date: December 19, 2009
- Season: 2009
- Stadium: Tropicana Field
- Location: St. Petersburg, Florida
- MVP: WR Mohamed Sanu, Rutgers
- Favorite: Rutgers by 3
- Referee: Matt Moore (SEC)
- Attendance: 28,793
- Payout: US$1 million

United States TV coverage
- Network: ESPN
- Announcers: Mark Jones, Bob Davie, and Rob Stone

The 2009 St. Petersburg Bowl was the second edition of the college football bowl game and was played at Tropicana Field in St. Petersburg, Florida. The game began at 8:00 p.m. US EST on Saturday, December 19, 2009, was telecast on ESPN and featured the UCF of Conference USA and Rutgers of the Big East. Rutgers defeated UCF 45–24 in a game where Mohamed Sanu, the game's MVP, caught 4 passes for 97 yards and a touchdown in addition to rushing 14 times for 47 yards and two touchdowns. Through sponsorship from the Beef O'Brady's restaurant franchise, the game was officially known as the 2009 St. Petersburg Bowl presented by Beef 'O' Brady's.

The game marked the Scarlet Knights' fifth consecutive bowl appearance, and their fourth consecutive victory, after not playing in a bowl game from 1979 to 2005. Rutgers was one of nine BCS teams to win a bowl game in each of the last three seasons. This was UCF's third bowl game, the last one was in the 2007 Liberty Bowl. With the loss, Central Florida dropped to 0–3 in the postseason. The bowl game marked the first ever meeting between Rutgers and UCF, both teams being called "Knights".

== Game summary ==
Rutgers wore their home red uniforms, and UCF wore their away white uniforms.

== Scoring summary ==
Scoring Play	Score
1st Quarter
Rutgers - Mohamed Sanu 5 Yd Run (San San Te Kick), 8:37	Rutgers 7–0
UCF - Kamar Aiken 7 Yd Pass From Brett Hodges (Nick Cattoi Kick), 4:31	Tie 7–7
Rutgers - Tim Brown 65 Yd Pass From Tom Savage (San San Te Kick), 3:54	Rutgers 14–7
2nd Quarter
UCF - Nick Cattoi 25 Yd FG, 14:56	Rutgers 14–10
Rutgers - Mohamed Sanu 1 Yd Run (San San Te Kick), 5:50	Rutgers 21–10
UCF - Kamar Aiken 34 Yd Pass From Brett Hodges (Nick Cattoi Kick), 2:32	Rutgers 21–17
Rutgers - Billy Anderson 19 Yd Interception Return (San San Te Kick), 1:38	Rutgers 28–17
3rd Quarter
Rutgers - Mohamed Sanu 11 Yd Pass From Tom Savage (San San Te Kick), 12:37	Rutgers 35–17
Rutgers - San San Te 43 Yd FG, 8:09	Rutgers 38–17
4th Quarter
UCF - Jonathan Davis 2 Yd Run (Nick Cattoi Kick), 2:23	Rutgers 38–24
Rutgers - Damaso Munoz 35 Yd Kickoff Return (San San Te Kick), 2:16	Rutgers 45–24
