= 2009 Memphis Tigers football team =

American college football season

2009 Memphis Tigers football
- Conference: Conference USA
- East
- Record: 2–10 (1–7 CUSA)
- Head coach: Tommy West (9th season)
- Offensive coordinator: Clay Helton (3rd season)
- Offensive scheme: Spread
- Defensive coordinator: Kenny Ingram (1st season)
- Base defense: 4–3
- Home stadium: Liberty Bowl Memorial Stadium

2009 Conference USA football standings
	Conf.			Overall
Team	W		L	W		L
East Division
East Carolina x$	7	–	1	9	–	5
UCF	6	–	2	8	–	5
Southern Miss	5	–	3	7	–	6
Marshall	4	–	4	7	–	6
UAB	4	–	4	5	–	7
Memphis	1	–	7	2	–	10
West Division
Houston xy	6	–	2	10	–	4
SMU x	6	–	2	8	–	5
Tulsa	3	–	5	5	–	7
UTEP	3	–	5	4	–	8
Rice	2	–	6	2	–	10
Tulane	1	–	7	3	–	9
Championship: East Carolina 38, Houston 32
$ – Conference champion; x – Division champion/co-champions; y – Championship game participant; Rankings from AP Poll

The 2009 Memphis Tigers football team represented the University of Memphis in the 2009 NCAA Division I FBS college football season. The Tigers, led by 9th year head coach Tommy West, played their home games at the Liberty Bowl Memorial Stadium. Memphis finished the season 2–10 and 1–7 in CUSA play. Head coach Tommy West was fired at the end of the season. Top players included running back Curtis Steele, who was named Offensive Player of the Year for the second season in a row.

== Schedule ==
Date	Time	Opponent	Site	TV	Result	Attendance
September 6	2:30 pm	No. 10 Ole Miss*	Liberty Bowl; Memphis, TN (rivalry)	ESPN	L 14–45	45,207
September 12	6:00 pm	at Middle Tennessee*	Johnny "Red" Floyd Stadium; Murfreesboro, TN	CSS	L 14–31	28,105
September 19	7:30 pm	UT Martin*	Liberty Bowl; Memphis, TN		W 41–14	21,428
September 26	12:00 pm	Marshall	Liberty Bowl; Memphis, TN	CSS	L 16–27	20,063
October 3	3:30 pm	at UCF	Bright House Networks Stadium; Orlando, FL		L 14–32	40,408
October 10	7:00 pm	UTEP^{†}	Liberty Bowl; Memphis, TN		W 35–20	18,284
October 17	6:00 pm	at Southern Miss	M. M. Roberts Stadium; Hattiesburg, MS		L 16–36	30,022
October 27	7:00 pm	East Carolina	Liberty Bowl; Memphis, TN	ESPN2	L 19–38	4,117
November 7	7:00 pm	at Tennessee*	Neyland Stadium; Knoxville, TN	ESPNU	L 28–56	94,636
November 14	12:00 pm	UAB	Liberty Bowl; Memphis, TN	CSS	L 21–31	18,031
November 21	12:00 pm	at No. 22 Houston	Robertson Stadium; Houston, TX	CSS	L 14–55	22,036
November 27	2:30 pm	at Tulsa	H. A. Chapman Stadium; Tulsa, OK	CBSCS	L 30–33 ^{OT}	19,552
*Non-conference game; ^{†}Homecoming; Rankings from Coaches' Poll released prior to the game; All times are in Central time
