= 2009 Marshall Thundering Herd football team =

American college football season

2009 Marshall Thundering Herd football

Little Caesars Pizza Bowl champion

Little Caesars Pizza Bowl, W 21–17 vs. Ohio
- Conference: Conference USA
- East
- Record: 7–6 (4–4 C-USA)
- Head coach: Mark Snyder (regular season); Rick Minter (interim, bowl game)
- Offensive coordinator: John Shannon
- Defensive coordinator: Rick Minter (2nd season)
- Base defense: 3–4
- Home stadium: Joan C. Edwards Stadium (Capacity: 38,019)

2009 Conference USA football standings
	Conf.			Overall
Team	W		L	W		L
East Division
East Carolina x$	7	–	1	9	–	5
UCF	6	–	2	8	–	5
Southern Miss	5	–	3	7	–	6
Marshall	4	–	4	7	–	6
UAB	4	–	4	5	–	7
Memphis	1	–	7	2	–	10
West Division
Houston xy	6	–	2	10	–	4
SMU x	6	–	2	8	–	5
Tulsa	3	–	5	5	–	7
UTEP	3	–	5	4	–	8
Rice	2	–	6	2	–	10
Tulane	1	–	7	3	–	9
Championship: East Carolina 38, Houston 32
$ – Conference champion; x – Division champion/co-champions; y – Championship game participant; Rankings from AP Poll

The 2009 Marshall Thundering Herd football team represented Marshall University in the 2009 NCAA Division I FBS football season. Marshall competed as a member of the East Division of Conference USA, and played their home games at Joan C. Edwards Stadium. The Thundering Herd finished the season 7–6 overall and 4–4 in Conference USA play. They were invited to the Little Caesars Pizza Bowl, where they defeated Ohio, 21–17.

On November 29, it was announced that Mark Snyder had resigned as head coach. Defensive coordinator Rick Minter was elevated to interim head coach for the bowl game. Marshall hired Doc Holliday as Snyder's permanent replacement.

== Schedule ==
Date	Time	Opponent	Site	TV	Result	Attendance	Source
September 5	4:30 pm	Southern Illinois*	Joan C. Edwards Stadium; Huntington, WV		W 31–28	24,012	
September 12	1:30 pm	at No. 14 Virginia Tech*	Lane Stadium; Blacksburg, VA	ESPN360	L 10–52	66,233	
September 19	7:00 pm	Bowling Green*	Joan C. Edwards Stadium; Huntington, WV	WSAZ	W 17–10	23,029	
September 26	1:00 pm	at Memphis	Liberty Bowl Memorial Stadium; Memphis, TN	CSS	W 27–16	20,063	
October 3	12:00 pm	East Carolina^{†}	Joan C. Edwards Stadium; Huntington, WV (rivalry)	CBSCS	L 17–21	26,814	
October 10	3:30 pm	at Tulane	Louisiana Superdome; New Orleans, LA	CSS	W 31–10	28,312	
October 17	3:30 pm	at West Virginia*	Milan Puskar Stadium; Morgantown, WV (Friends of Coal Bowl)	ESPN Plus	L 7–24	54,432	
October 24	12:00 pm	UAB	Joan C. Edwards Stadium; Huntington, WV	CSS	W 27–7	18,878	
November 1	8:15 pm	at UCF	Bright House Networks Stadium; Orlando, FL	ESPN	L 20–21	35,676	
November 14	4:30 pm	Southern Miss	Joan C. Edwards Stadium; Huntington, WV		L 20–27	21,036	
November 21	4:30 pm	SMU	Joan C. Edwards Stadium; Huntington, WV		W 34–31	19,646	
November 28	3:00 pm	at UTEP	Sun Bowl; El Paso, TX	WSAZ	L 21–52	19,736	
December 26	1:00 pm	vs. Ohio	Ford Field; Detroit, MI (Little Caesars Pizza Bowl, Battle for the Bell)	ESPN	W 21–17	30,311	
*Non-conference game; ^{†}Homecoming; Rankings from AP Poll released prior to the game; All times are in Eastern time

== Game summaries ==
=== Southern Illinois ===
	1	2	3	4	Total
Salukis	7	7	7	7	28
Thundering Herd	0	7	21	3	31

=== Virginia Tech ===
	1	2	3	4	Total
Thundering Herd	0	7	0	3	10
#14 Hokies	7	28	10	7	52

=== Bowling Green ===
	1	2	3	4	Total
Falcons	0	7	0	3	10
Thundering Herd	0	0	7	10	17

=== Memphis ===
	1	2	3	4	Total
Thundering Herd	3	14	0	10	27
Tigers	7	3	3	3	16

=== East Carolina ===
	1	2	3	4	Total
Pirates	7	7	7	0	21
Thundering Herd	0	7	10	0	17

=== Tulane ===
	1	2	3	4	Total
Thundering Herd	14	7	3	7	31
Green Wave	7	0	0	3	10

=== West Virginia ===
	1	2	3	4	Total
Thundering Herd	7	0	0	0	7
Mountaineers	0	3	7	14	24

=== UAB ===
	1	2	3	4	Total
Blazers	0	7	0	0	7
Thundering Herd	3	14	7	3	27

=== UCF ===
	1	2	3	4	Total
Thundering Herd	0	17	3	0	20
Knights	0	7	0	14	21

=== Southern Miss ===
	1	2	3	4	Total
Golden Eagles	7	7	6	7	27
Thundering Herd	0	13	0	7	20

=== SMU ===
	1	2	3	4	Total
Mustangs	7	3	7	14	31
Thundering Herd	7	3	14	10	34

=== UTEP ===
	1	2	3	4	Total
Thundering Herd	0	14	7	0	21
Miners	13	7	22	10	52

=== Ohio (Little Caesars Pizza Bowl) ===
	1	2	3	4	Total
Thundering Herd	14	7	0	0	21
Bobcats	0	7	10	0	17

== Roster ==
2009 Marshall Thundering Herd football team roster
Players
Coaches
Offense

Pos.	#	Name	Class
QB	10	Mark Cann	So
QB	12	Brian Anderson	Jr
TE	16	Lee Smith	Jr

Defense

Pos.	#	Name	Class
DT	98	Delvin Johnson	Jr
DE	99	Vinny Curry	Jr

Special teams

Pos.	#	Name	Class

Head coach

- Mark Snyder

Coordinators/assistant coaches

- Rick Minter – Defensive coordinator (2nd Season)
- Todd Goebbel – Special teams coordinator and wide receivers coach (5th season)
- Alex Atkins – Graduate assistant (1st season)

Legend

- (C) Team captain
- (S) Suspended
- (I) Ineligible
- Injured
- Redshirt

Roster
