= 2009 Southern Miss Golden Eagles football team =

American college football season

2009 Southern Miss Golden Eagles football

New Orleans Bowl, L 32–42 vs. Middle Tennessee
- Conference: Conference USA
- East Division
- Record: 7–6 (5–3 C-USA)
- Head coach: Larry Fedora (2nd season)
- Offensive coordinator: Darrell Wyatt (2nd season)
- Offensive scheme: Spread
- Defensive coordinator: Todd Bradford (2nd season)
- Base defense: 4–3
- Home stadium: M. M. Roberts Stadium

2009 Conference USA football standings
| | Conf. | | | Overall |
| Team | W | | L | W | | L |
|---|---|---|---|---|---|---|
East Division
| East Carolina x$ | 7 | – | 1 | 9 | – | 5 |
| UCF | 6 | – | 2 | 8 | – | 5 |
| Southern Miss | 5 | – | 3 | 7 | – | 6 |
| Marshall | 4 | – | 4 | 7 | – | 6 |
| UAB | 4 | – | 4 | 5 | – | 7 |
| Memphis | 1 | – | 7 | 2 | – | 10 |
West Division
| Houston xy | 6 | – | 2 | 10 | – | 4 |
| SMU x | 6 | – | 2 | 8 | – | 5 |
| Tulsa | 3 | – | 5 | 5 | – | 7 |
| UTEP | 3 | – | 5 | 4 | – | 8 |
| Rice | 2 | – | 6 | 2 | – | 10 |
| Tulane | 1 | – | 7 | 3 | – | 9 |
Championship: East Carolina 38, Houston 32
$ – Conference champion; x – Division champion/co-champions; y – Championship game participant; Rankings from AP Poll

The 2009 Southern Miss Golden Eagles football team represented The University of Southern Mississippi in the 2009 NCAA Division I FBS football season. The team's head coach was Larry Fedora, who was in his second year at Southern Miss. They played their home games at M. M. Roberts Stadium in Hattiesburg, Mississippi and competed in the East Division of Conference USA.

The Golden Eagles finished the season with a record of 7–6, 5–3 in C-USA play and lost to Middle Tennessee, 42–32, in the New Orleans Bowl.

== Schedule ==
| Date | Time | Opponent | Site | TV | Result | Attendance | Source |
|---|---|---|---|---|---|---|---|
| September 5 | 6:00 pm | Alcorn State* | M. M. Roberts Stadium; Hattiesburg, MS | | W 52–0 | 36,232 | |
| September 12 | 6:00 pm | UCF | M. M. Roberts Stadium; Hattiesburg, MS | | W 26–19 | 27,456 | |
| September 19 | 2:30 pm | Virginia* | M. M. Roberts Stadium; Hattiesburg, MS | CBSCS | W 37–34 | 31,170 | |
| September 26 | 11:30 am | at No. 20 Kansas* | Memorial Stadium; Lawrence, KS | FSN | L 28–35 | 50,025 | |
| October 1 | 7:00 pm | at UAB | Legion Field; Birmingham, AL | CBSCS | L 17–30 | 26,871 | |
| October 10 | 6:30 pm | at Louisville* | Papa John's Cardinal Stadium; Louisville, KY | ESPNU | L 23–25 | 37,268 | |
| October 17 | 6:00 pm | Memphis | M. M. Roberts Stadium; Hattiesburg, MS | | W 36–16 | 30,022 | |
| October 24 | 6:00 pm | Tulane^{†} | M. M. Roberts Stadium; Hattiesburg, MS (Battle for the Bell) | | W 43–6 | 30,541 | |
| October 31 | 12:00 pm | at No. 15 Houston | Robertson Stadium; Houston, TX | | L 43–50 | 20,125 | |
| November 14 | 3:30 pm | at Marshall | Joan C. Edwards Stadium; Huntington, WV | | W 27–20 | 21,036 | |
| November 21 | 6:00 pm | Tulsa | M. M. Roberts Stadium; Hattiesburg, MS | | W 44–34 | 28,757 | |
| November 28 | 12:30 pm | at East Carolina | Dowdy–Ficklen Stadium; Greenville, NC | | L 20–25 | 43,006 | |
| December 20 | 7:30 pm | vs. Middle Tennessee* | Louisiana Superdome; New Orleans, LA (New Orleans Bowl) | ESPN | L 32–42 | 30,228 | |
*Non-conference game; ^{†}Homecoming; Rankings from AP Poll released prior to the game; All times are in Central time

== Game summaries ==
=== Alcorn State ===
The Golden Eagles and Braves met for the first time in each schools' history. Southern Miss set an attendance record of 36,232.

| | 1 | 2 | 3 | 4 | Total |
|---|---|---|---|---|---|
| Alcorn State | 0 | 0 | 0 | 0 | 0 |
| Golden Eagles | 14 | 21 | 7 | 10 | 52 |

=== UCF ===
| | 1 | 2 | 3 | 4 | Total |
|---|---|---|---|---|---|
| UCF | 0 | 10 | 0 | 9 | 19 |
| Golden Eagles | 14 | 6 | 0 | 6 | 26 |

=== Virginia ===
| | 1 | 2 | 3 | 4 | Total |
|---|---|---|---|---|---|
| Virginia | 13 | 14 | 7 | 0 | 34 |
| Golden Eagles | 0 | 10 | 14 | 13 | 37 |

=== Kansas ===
| | 1 | 2 | 3 | 4 | Total |
|---|---|---|---|---|---|
| Golden Eagles | 7 | 7 | 14 | 0 | 28 |
| Kansas | 14 | 7 | 7 | 7 | 35 |

=== UAB ===
| | 1 | 2 | 3 | 4 | Total |
|---|---|---|---|---|---|
| Golden Eagles | 0 | 10 | 0 | 7 | 17 |
| UAB | 10 | 0 | 7 | 13 | 30 |

=== Louisville ===
| | 1 | 2 | 3 | 4 | Total |
|---|---|---|---|---|---|
| Golden Eagles | 6 | 10 | 0 | 7 | 23 |
| Louisville | 7 | 0 | 15 | 3 | 25 |

=== Memphis ===
| | 1 | 2 | 3 | 4 | Total |
|---|---|---|---|---|---|
| Memphis | 3 | 3 | 3 | 7 | 16 |
| Golden Eagles | 0 | 10 | 14 | 12 | 36 |

=== Tulane ===
| | 1 | 2 | 3 | 4 | Total |
|---|---|---|---|---|---|
| Tulane | 0 | 0 | 6 | 0 | 6 |
| Golden Eagles | 7 | 13 | 6 | 17 | 43 |

=== Houston ===
| | 1 | 2 | 3 | 4 | Total |
|---|---|---|---|---|---|
| Golden Eagles | 13 | 9 | 0 | 21 | 43 |
| Houston | 7 | 23 | 3 | 17 | 50 |

=== Marshall ===
| | 1 | 2 | 3 | 4 | Total |
|---|---|---|---|---|---|
| Golden Eagles | 7 | 7 | 6 | 7 | 27 |
| Marshall | 0 | 13 | 0 | 7 | 20 |

=== Tulsa ===
| | 1 | 2 | 3 | 4 | Total |
|---|---|---|---|---|---|
| Tulsa | 14 | 14 | 0 | 6 | 34 |
| Golden Eagles | 6 | 28 | 10 | 0 | 44 |

=== East Carolina ===
| | 1 | 2 | 3 | 4 | Total |
|---|---|---|---|---|---|
| Golden Eagles | 7 | 0 | 7 | 6 | 20 |
| East Carolina | 3 | 14 | 0 | 8 | 25 |

=== Middle Tennessee – New Orleans Bowl ===
| | 1 | 2 | 3 | 4 | Total |
|---|---|---|---|---|---|
| Golden Eagles | 14 | 3 | 3 | 12 | 32 |
| Middle Tennessee | 0 | 14 | 14 | 14 | 42 |
