= 2009 Conference USA Football Championship Game =

- Conference Championship
Houston Cougars	East Carolina Pirates
(10–2)	(8–4)
32	38
Head coach: Kevin Sumlin	Head coach: Skip Holtz
AP / Coaches / BCS; 18 / 18 / 21
	1	2	3	4	Total
Houston	7	12	0	13	32
East Carolina	7	7	10	14	38
- Date: December 5, 2009
- Season: 2009
- Stadium: Dowdy–Ficklen Stadium
- Location: Greenville, North Carolina
- MVP: Dwayne Harris (WR, East Carolina)
- Favorite: Houston by 2
- Referee: R.G. Detillier
- Attendance: 33,048

United States TV coverage
- Network: ESPN2
- Announcers: Ron Franklin (play-by-play), Ed Cunningham (analyst)

2009 Conference USA football standings
	Conf.			Overall
Team	W		L	W		L
East Division
East Carolina x$	7	–	1	9	–	5
UCF	6	–	2	8	–	5
Southern Miss	5	–	3	7	–	6
Marshall	4	–	4	7	–	6
UAB	4	–	4	5	–	7
Memphis	1	–	7	2	–	10
West Division
Houston xy	6	–	2	10	–	4
SMU x	6	–	2	8	–	5
Tulsa	3	–	5	5	–	7
UTEP	3	–	5	4	–	8
Rice	2	–	6	2	–	10
Tulane	1	–	7	3	–	9
Championship: East Carolina 38, Houston 32
$ – Conference champion; x – Division champion/co-champions; y – Championship game participant; Rankings from AP Poll

The 2009 Conference USA Football Championship Game was played on December 5, 2009, between the East Carolina Pirates, the champion of Conference USA's East Division, and the West Division champion Houston Cougars at Dowdy–Ficklen Stadium in Greenville, North Carolina.

The game kicked off at 12:00 pm EST and was televised by ESPN2. The Pirates were looking to be the first team in C-USA history to win back to back conference championships, while the Cougars led by Case Keenum looked to win their 2nd.

East Carolina won 38-32, earning both a second consecutive conference championship and trip to the Liberty Bowl. Case Keenum set a title game and C-USA record with 527 passing yards in the losing effort. He was two completions short of the all-time NCAA single-game record with 56 (Andy Schmitt had 58 for Eastern Michigan in a 2008 game).

== Game summary ==
The game was held at the Dowdy–Ficklen Stadium in Greenville, North Carolina, the home field of East Carolina. Hosting privileges were determined by the better conference records; East Carolina finished C-USA play at 7–1, better than Houston's 6–2.

== Scoring summary ==
Scoring summary

Quarter	Time	Drive			Team	Scoring information	Score	
Quarter	Time	Plays	Yards	TOP	Team	Scoring information	Houston	East Carolina
"TOP" = time of possession. For other American football terms, see Glossary of American football.							32	38
