= 2009 Rice Owls football team =

American college football season

2009 Rice Owls football
- Conference: Conference USA
- West
- Record: 2–10 (2–6 C-USA)
- Head coach: David Bailiff (3rd season)
- Offensive coordinator: Ed Zaunbrecher (1st season)
- Offensive scheme: Spread
- Defensive coordinator: Chuck Driesbach (3rd season)
- Co-defensive coordinator: Craig Naivar (3rd season)
- Base defense: 4–3
- Home stadium: Rice Stadium

2009 Conference USA football standings
	Conf.			Overall
Team	W		L	W		L
East Division
East Carolina x$	7	–	1	9	–	5
UCF	6	–	2	8	–	5
Southern Miss	5	–	3	7	–	6
Marshall	4	–	4	7	–	6
UAB	4	–	4	5	–	7
Memphis	1	–	7	2	–	10
West Division
Houston xy	6	–	2	10	–	4
SMU x	6	–	2	8	–	5
Tulsa	3	–	5	5	–	7
UTEP	3	–	5	4	–	8
Rice	2	–	6	2	–	10
Tulane	1	–	7	3	–	9
Championship: East Carolina 38, Houston 32
$ – Conference champion; x – Division champion/co-champions; y – Championship game participant; Rankings from AP Poll

The 2009 Rice Owls football team represented Rice University in the 2009 NCAA Division I FBS college football season. The Owls, led by 3rd year head coach David Bailiff, played their home games at Rice Stadium in Houston, Texas. The Rice Owls football team finished the season 2–10 and 2–6 in CUSA play.

== Schedule ==
Date	Time	Opponent	Site	TV	Result	Attendance
September 5	3:00 pm	at UAB	Legion Field; Birmingham, AL	CSS	L 24–44	14,316
September 12	6:00 pm	at Texas Tech*	Jones AT&T Stadium; Lubbock, TX		L 10–55	48,124
September 19	6:00 pm	at No. 16 Oklahoma State*	Boone Pickens Stadium; Stillwater, OK		L 24–41	51,803
September 26	7:00 pm	Vanderbilt*	Rice Stadium; Houston, TX	CSS	L 17–36	19,753
October 3	6:30 pm	Tulsa	Rice Stadium; Houston, TX	CBSCS	L 10–27	11,420
October 10	2:30 pm	Navy*	Rice Stadium; Houston, TX	CBSCS	L 14–63	15,096
October 17	2:30 pm	at East Carolina	Dowdy–Ficklen Stadium; Greenville, NC		L 13–49	43,023
October 24	2:30 pm	UCF	Rice Stadium; Houston, TX		L 7–49	10,196
November 7	2:00 pm	at SMU	Gerald J. Ford Stadium; Dallas, TX (Battle for the Mayor's Cup)		L 28–31	15,475
November 14	2:30 pm	Tulane^{†}	Rice Stadium; Houston, TX		W 28–20	14,728
November 21	2:30 pm	UTEP	Rice Stadium; Houston, TX		W 30–29	10,116
November 28	7:00 pm	at No. 20 Houston	Robertson Stadium; Houston, TX (rivalry)	CSS	L 14–73	28,243
*Non-conference game; ^{†}Homecoming; Rankings from Coaches' Poll released prior to the game; All times are in Central time
