= 2009 Kansas Jayhawks football team =

American college football season

2009 Kansas Jayhawks football
- Conference: Big 12 Conference
- North
- Record: 5–7 (1–7 Big 12)
- Head coach: Mark Mangino (9th season)
- Offensive coordinator: Ed Warinner (3rd season)
- Offensive scheme: Spread
- Co-defensive coordinators: Clint Bowen (4th season); Bill Miller (1st season)
- Base defense: 4–3
- Home stadium: Memorial Stadium

Uniform

2009 Big 12 Conference football standings
	Conf.			Overall
Team	W		L	W		L
North Division
No. 14 Nebraska x	6	–	2	10	–	4
Missouri	4	–	4	8	–	5
Kansas State	4	–	4	6	–	6
Iowa State	3	–	5	7	–	6
Colorado	2	–	6	3	–	9
Kansas	1	–	7	5	–	7
South Division
No. 2 Texas x$	8	–	0	13	–	1
Oklahoma State	6	–	2	9	–	4
No. 21 Texas Tech	5	–	3	9	–	4
Oklahoma	5	–	3	8	–	5
Texas A&M	3	–	5	6	–	7
Baylor	1	–	7	4	–	8
Championship: Texas 13, Nebraska 12
$ – BCS representative as conference champion; x – Division champion/co-champions; Rankings from AP Poll

The 2009 Kansas Jayhawks football team (variously "Kansas", "KU", or the "Jayhawks") represented the University of Kansas in the 2009 NCAA Division I FBS football season, which was the school's 120th season and the eighth and final year under Mark Mangino, who resigned following the season under pressure from both an internal investigation into his treatment of players and discontent from the season's results. It was Ed Warinner's third season as offensive coordinator and fifth year overall. The Jayhawks played their home games at Memorial Stadium in Lawrence, Kansas and were members of the Big 12 Conference

After beginning the season with five victories, the team lost their next seven games to finish the season with a 5–7 overall record (1–7 in the Big 12 Conference). It was the worst overall record since 2004 (when the Jayhawks won just four games) and the worst conference record since their winless 2002 season (in which they could only win two non-conference games).

== Pre-season ==
=== Coaching changes ===
Less than a month after being promoted to defensive coordinator at Louisville Bill Miller resigned and joined the Jayhawks as co-defensive coordinator and linebackers coach, replacing previous linebackers coach Steve Tovar.

Tom Sims replaced Joe Bob Clements, who left for Kansas State, as defensive line coach. Sims spent the last four seasons with Illinois. A few weeks earlier, Kerry Locklin of Fresno State accepted the defensive line coaching job, but subsequently accepted a job with the NFL's New York Jets and Sims was hired instead.

=== Recruiting ===
Following the 2009 signing day, the Jayhawks recruiting class was ranked 31st by Rivals and 50 by Scout. Expand the list below to see the full class.

College recruiting information (2009)
Name	Hometown	School	Height	Weight	40^{‡}	Commit date
D.J. Beshears; WR/DB	Denton, TX	Ryan HS	5 ft 9 in (1.75 m)	185 lb (84 kg)	–	Jan 18, 2009
D.J. Beshears; WR/DB	Recruit ratings: Scout: Rivals:					
Vernon Brooks; WLB	Missouri City, TX	Blinn College	6 ft 0 in (1.83 m)	230 lb (100 kg)	4.6	Jun 26, 2009
Vernon Brooks; WLB	Recruit ratings: Scout: Rivals:					
Randall Dent; DT	Grand Prairie, TX	So Grand Prairie HS	6 ft 5 in (1.96 m)	255 lb (116 kg)	4.95	Dec 7, 2008
Randall Dent; DT	Recruit ratings: Scout: Rivals:					
Gavin Howard; OT	Owasso, OK	Owasso HS	6 ft 5 in (1.96 m)	265 lb (120 kg)	–	Jun 23, 2008
Gavin Howard; OT	Recruit ratings: Scout: Rivals:					
Julian Jones; MLB	Lawton, OK	MacArthur HS	6 ft 2 in (1.88 m)	255 lb (116 kg)	–	Oct 27, 2008
Julian Jones; MLB	Recruit ratings: Scout: Rivals:					
Prinz Kande; S	Euless, TX	Trinity HS	5 ft 11 in (1.80 m)	182 lb (83 kg)	4.5	Jun 7, 2008
Prinz Kande; S	Recruit ratings: Scout: Rivals:					
Darian Kelly; S	Girard, KS	Girard HS	6 ft 1 in (1.85 m)	195 lb (88 kg)	4.5	Jun 6, 2008
Darian Kelly; S	Recruit ratings: Scout: Rivals:					
Dexter Linton; CB	Arlington, TX	Bowie HS	5 ft 10 in (1.78 m)	175 lb (79 kg)	4.42	Jun 26, 2008
Dexter Linton; CB	Recruit ratings: Scout: Rivals:					
Tom Mabry; OT	Belleville, IL	Althoff Catholic HS	6 ft 5 in (1.96 m)	270 lb (120 kg)	–	Jan 18, 2009
Tom Mabry; OT	Recruit ratings: Scout: Rivals:					
Christian Matthews; QB	Arlington, TX	Bowie HS	6 ft 3 in (1.91 m)	180 lb (82 kg)	4.6	Jun 22, 2008
Christian Matthews; QB	Recruit ratings: Scout: Rivals:					
Bradley McDougald; S/WR	Dublin, OH	Dublin Scioto HS	6 ft 1 in (1.85 m)	190 lb (86 kg)	4.5	Jan 18, 2009
Bradley McDougald; S/WR	Recruit ratings: Scout: Rivals:					
Erick McGriff; WR	Tampa, FL	Jesuit HS	6 ft 3 in (1.91 m)	190 lb (86 kg)	4.6	Jan 4, 2009
Erick McGriff; WR	Recruit ratings: Scout: Rivals:					
Chris Omigie; WR	Arlington, TX	Martin HS	6 ft 5 in (1.96 m)	190 lb (86 kg)	–	Jan 4, 2009
Chris Omigie; WR	Recruit ratings: Scout: Rivals:					
Toben Opurum; RB/FB	Plano, TX	Plano East HS	6 ft 2 in (1.88 m)	225 lb (102 kg)	4.5	Dec 23, 2008
Toben Opurum; RB/FB	Recruit ratings: Scout: Rivals:					
Tyler Patmon; CB	Cedar Park, TX	Vista Ridge HS	5 ft 11 in (1.80 m)	165 lb (75 kg)	4.5	Apr 17, 2009
Tyler Patmon; CB	Recruit ratings: Scout: Rivals:					
Calvin Rubles; CB/S	Richardson, TX	Tyler JC	6 ft 3 in (1.91 m)	185 lb (84 kg)	4.4	Dec 10, 2008
Calvin Rubles; CB/S	Recruit ratings: Scout: Rivals:					
Deshaun Sands; RB	Sunrise, FL	Piper HS	5 ft 9 in (1.75 m)	175 lb (79 kg)	4.5	Apr 10, 2008
Deshaun Sands; RB	Recruit ratings: Scout: Rivals:					
Tyrone Sellers; DE	McCook, NE	McCook Senior HS	6 ft 4 in (1.93 m)	215 lb (98 kg)	4.6	Jul 2, 2008
Tyrone Sellers; DE	Recruit ratings: Scout: Rivals:					
Riley Spencer; OT	Hesston, KS	Hesston HS	6 ft 6 in (1.98 m)	265 lb (120 kg)	5.1	Jun 21, 2008
Riley Spencer; OT	Recruit ratings: Scout: Rivals:					
Travis Stephens; DE	Houston, TX	Blinn College	6 ft 3 in (1.91 m)	250 lb (110 kg)	4.76	Dec 21, 2008
Travis Stephens; DE	Recruit ratings: Scout: Rivals:					
Huldon Tharp; WLB	Mulvane, KS	Mulvane HS	6 ft 1 in (1.85 m)	215 lb (98 kg)	4.45	Aug 28, 2008
Huldon Tharp; WLB	Recruit ratings: Scout: Rivals:					
Jacoby Thomas; DE	Texarkana, TX	Texas HS	6 ft 3 in (1.91 m)	225 lb (102 kg)	4.6	Dec 10, 2008
Jacoby Thomas; DE	Recruit ratings: Scout: Rivals:					
Jordan Webb; QB	Union, MO	Union HS	6 ft 1 in (1.85 m)	198 lb (90 kg)	–	Apr 12, 2008
Jordan Webb; QB	Recruit ratings: Scout: Rivals:					
Quintin Woods; DE	Flint, MI	Bakersfield JC	6 ft 6 in (1.98 m)	225 lb (102 kg)	4.65	Jan 18, 2009
Quintin Woods; DE	Recruit ratings: Scout: Rivals:					
Kevin Young; DE	Olathe, KS	Olathe North HS	6 ft 3 in (1.91 m)	226 lb (103 kg)	4.78	Jan 9, 2009
Kevin Young; DE	Recruit ratings: Scout: Rivals:					
Overall recruit ranking: Scout: 50 Rivals: 31 ESPN: NR
‡ Refers to 40-yard dash; Note: In many cases, Scout, Rivals, 247Sports, On3, and ESPN may conflict in their listings of height, weight and 40 time.; In these cases, the average was taken. ESPN grades are on a 100-point scale.; Sources: "2009 Kansas Football Commits". Rivals.; "2009 Kansas Football Commits". Scout.; "ESPN". ESPN.; "Scout.com Team Recruiting Rankings". Scout.; "2009 Team Ranking". Rivals.com.

== Schedule ==
Date	Time	Opponent	Rank	Site	TV	Result	Attendance
September 5	6:00 p.m.	Northern Colorado*	No. 25	Memorial Stadium; Lawrence, KS	Fox College Sports	W 49–3	52,530
September 12	6:30 p.m.	at UTEP*	No. 24	Sun Bowl Stadium; El Paso, TX	CBS CS	W 34–7	31,885
September 19	11:00 a.m.	Duke*	No. 22	Memorial Stadium; Lawrence, KS	Versus	W 44–16	50,101
September 26	11:00 a.m.	Southern Miss*	No. 20	Memorial Stadium; Lawrence, KS	FSN	W 35–28	50,025
October 10	11:30 a.m.	Iowa State^{†}	No. 16	Memorial Stadium; Lawrence, KS	Versus	W 41–36	48,203
October 17	6:00 p.m.	at Colorado	No. 17	Folsom Field; Boulder, CO	FSN	L 30–34	51,146
October 24	2:30 p.m.	No. 25 Oklahoma	No. 24	Memorial Stadium; Lawrence, KS	ABC	L 13–35	51,104
October 31	2:30 p.m.	at Texas Tech		Jones AT&T Stadium; Lubbock, TX	ABC	L 21–42	47,291
November 7	11:30 a.m.	at Kansas State		Bill Snyder Family Stadium; Manhattan, KS (Sunflower Showdown)	Versus	L 10–17	48,306
November 14	2:30 p.m.	Nebraska		Memorial Stadium; Lawrence, KS (rivalry)	ABC	L 17–31	51,525
November 21	7:00 p.m.	at No. 2 Texas		Darrell K Royal–Texas Memorial Stadium; Austin, TX	ABC	L 20–51	101,357
November 28	2:30 p.m.	vs. Missouri		Arrowhead Stadium; Kansas City, MO (Border War)	ABC	L 39–41	70,072
*Non-conference game; ^{†}Homecoming; Rankings from AP Poll released prior to the game; All times are in Central time

== Roster ==
In February, reserve quarterback Tyler Lawrence left the team to graduate early. Running back Sean Ransburg was listed as a transfer at MidAmerica Nazarene University in Olathe. Wide receiver Xavier Rambo is listed as a transfer at Delta State University. Running back Jocques Crawford's transfer to an unnamed school was announced July 24. KU announced Ben Lueken's departure August 6.

2009 Kansas Jayhawks football roster
(starters in bold)
**Quarterbacks**: 2 Jordan Webb – Fr.; 5 **Todd Reesing** – Sr.; 7 Kale Pick – (redshirt) Fr.; 12 Christian Matthews – Fr.; 15 Chase Knighton – So.; 16 Jacob Morse; **Running backs**: 1 **Jake Sharp** – Sr.; 6 Rell Lewis – (redshirt) So.; 8 Daniel Porter – Jr.; 35 Toben Opurum – Fr.; 36 Deshaun Sands – Fr.; 37 Ryan Burton; 40 Tyler Hunt – (redshirt) Fr.; 46 Steve Mestan; **Wide receivers**: 3 Reece Petty – (redshirt) Jr.; 9 Raimond Pendleton – (redshirt) Sr.; 10 **Kerry Meier** – (redshirt) Sr. (also QB); 19 Isiah Barfield – (redshirt) So.; 23 Gabe Cunning; 24 Bradley McDougald – Fr.; 28 Willie O'Quinn – So.; 38 Jeff Hickerson; 80 **Dezmon Briscoe** -Jr.; 81 **Jonathan Wilson** – Jr.; 83 Chris Omigie – Fr.; 85 Rod Harris – (redshirt) So.; 88 Erick McGriff – Fr.; 88 Patrick Schilling – (redshirt) Fr.; 89 Tertavian Ingram – (redshirt) So.; **Tight ends**: 11 A.J. Steward – (redshirt) So.; 43 Ted McNulty – (redshirt) So.; 82 Nick Plato – (redshirt) Fr.; 86 **Tim Biere** – So.; 87 Bradley Dedeaux – (redshirt) Jr.	**Offensive line**: 54 Justin Carnes; 55 Darius Parish – So.; 56 Kayl Anderson – (redshirt) Sr. (long snapper); 59 **Sal Capra** – (redshirt) Jr.; 62 Alex Smith – (redshirt) Jr.; 63 Ian Wolfe – (redshirt) Jr.; 65 Mike Martinovich -So. (TR); 66 Tom Mabry – Fr.; 68 Carl Wilson – (redshirt) Jr.; 69 Trevor Marrongelli – (redshirt) Fr.; 70 Gavin Howard – Fr.; 71 John Williams – (redshirt) Fr.; 72 **Tanner Hawkinson** – (redshirt) Fr.; 73 Joe Semple – (redshirt) Fr; 74 **Jeff Spikes** – (redshirt) So.; 76 **Brad Thorson** – (redshirt) Jr.; 77 **Jeremiah Hatch** – (redshirt) So.; 79 Riley Spencer – Fr.; **Defensive line**: 50 Tyrone Sellers – Fr.; 54 Kevin Young – Fr.; 64 Randall Dent – Fr.; 75 Travis Stephens – Jr.; 78 Shane Smith; 84 Jeff Wheeler – (redshirt) Sr.; 90 **Maxwell Onyegbule** – (redshirt) Sr.; 91 **Jake Laptad** – Jr.; 92 **Patrick Dorsey** – (redshirt) So.; 93 Quintin Woods – Jr.; 94 Caleb Blakesley – (redshirt) Sr.; 95 D.J. Marshall – (redshirt) Fr.; 96 Dustin Spears – (redshirt) Sr.; 97 **Richard Johnson Jr.** – (redshirt) So.; 98 Duane Zlatnik – (redshirt) Fr.; 99 Jamal Greene – (redshirt) Jr.	**Linebackers**: 9 Vernon Brooks – Jr.; 22 Angus Quigley – (redshirt) Sr.; 29 Ryan Nelson; 31 Steven Foster – (redshirt) So.; 34 Huldon Tharp – Fr.; 38 Josh Richardson – (redshirt) Fr.; 40 Jacoby Thomas – Fr.; 41 **Arist Wright** – (redshirt) Sr.; 45 Justin Springer – Jr.; 49 **Drew Dudley** – Jr.; 50 Jordan Fee – (redshirt) Fr.; 51 Dakota Lewis – (redshirt) Jr.; 52 Steven Johnson – So.; 57 Chea Peterman – (redshirt) So.; 58 Jake Schermer – (redshirt) Sr.; **Cornerbacks**: 15 **Daymond Patterson** – So.; 16 **Chris Harris** – Jr.; 17 Calvin Rubles – Jr.; 20 D.J. Beshears – Fr.; 20 Taylor Lee – (redshirt) Fr.; 23 Ryan Murphy – (redshirt) So.; 27 Greg Brown – (redshirt) Fr.; 30 **Anthony Davis** – (redshirt) So.; 33 Tyler Patmon – Fr.; 35 Corrigan Powell – So.; **Safeties**: 4 Prinz Kande – Fr.; 13 Lubbock Smith – (redshirt) Fr.; 25 **Darrell Stuckey** – (redshirt) Sr.; 26 Phillip Strozier – (redshirt) Jr.; 32 Dexter Linton – Fr.; 37 Brian Blackwell – (redshirt) Fr.; 44 Olaitan Oguntodu – (redshirt) Jr.; 46 **Justin Thornton** – (redshirt) Sr.; 47 Brandon Hawks – (redshirt) Fr.; **Punters**: 18 **Alonso Rojas** – Jr.; **Kickers**: 4 John Milsap – (redshirt) Fr.; 14 **Jacob Branstetter** – (redshirt) So.; 18 **Alonso Rojas** – Jr.

== Game summaries ==
Northern Colorado vs. #25 Kansas [box score]

Team	1	2	3	4	Total
Northern Colorado	0	0	3	0	3
• #25 Kansas	7	21	0	21	49

- Date: September 5
- Location: Memorial Stadium, Lawrence, KS
- Game start: 6:08 pm CDT
- Elapsed time: 3:02
- Game attendance: 52,530
- Game weather: 77 °F (25 °C), partly cloudy
- Referee: Rick Loumiet
- TV announcers (FCS Central): Dan McLaughlin, Yogi Roth, Samantha Steele

=== Northern Colorado ===
Kansas won its first ever match-up against Northern Colorado in convincing fashion as the 25th ranked team in the nation. This was the sixth straight home-opener win for Kansas. It was also a new attendance record with 52,530 fans in attendance.

Senior Quarterback Todd Reesing directed the Kansas offense to success from the start of the game. He threw for 208 yards on 13 attempts and 2 touchdowns. Furthermore, he also ran for 79 yards and scored 2 rushing touchdowns. This was Reesing's most successful game in terms of rushing since the 2007 season. Reesing found numerous opportunities to run as Northern Colorado was preoccupied with slowing Kansas' passing attack. Kansas' passing attack was also hurt by the 1-game suspension of leading wide-receiver Desmond Briscoe. Senior running-back Jake Sharp led Kansas in rushing with 123 yards on 21 carries and 2 touchdowns (1 rushing, 1 receiving). Senior wide-receiver Kerry Meier led the team with 5 receptions for 115 yards.

Freshman running-back Toben Opurum had a notable first game in a Kansas uniform. He ran for 79 yards on 8 carries and scored 2 touchdowns. Backup red-shirt Freshman Quarterback Kale Pick also played his first minutes in a Kansas uniform in the 4th Quarter.

#24 Kansas vs. UTEP [box score]

Team	1	2	3	4	Total
• #24 Kansas	3	17	7	7	34
UTEP	0	0	0	7	7

- Date: September 12
- Location: Sun Bowl Stadium, El Paso, TX
- Game start: 5:30 pm MDT
- Elapsed time: 3:19
- Game attendance: 31,885
- Game weather: 85 °F (29 °C), overcast
- Referee: Tom Walker
- TV announcers (CBS College Sports): Tom Hart, Aaron Taylor

=== UTEP ===
Senior DE Maxwell Onyegbule and the Jayhawk defense set the tone early as the University of Kansas football team rolled past UTEP 34–7 in front of 31,885 fans in the Sun Bowl. Senior QB Todd Reesing guided the offense to over 575 yards of total offense as KU improved to 2–0 for the sixth straight season, while the Miners fell to 0–2.

In the first half alone, Onyegbule had two sacks and four total tackles for loss to lead a defense that finished the half with five sacks, 11 tackles for loss, an interception and a pair of quarterback hurries. UTEP was forced to punt on six of its seven possessions of the half and mustered just three first downs. For the game, the defense held UTEP to just 208 yards and seven first downs. Seven players recorded tackles for losses led by Onyegbule with five. Add to that line six quarterback hurries, three passes broken up and an interception, and it was a good night for the defense in El Paso.

Reesing finished 25-of-41 for 260 yards, one touchdown and one interception. Kansas racked up 576 total yards and outdid the Miners 23–7 on first downs.

The win also improved Mark Mangino's overall record to 47–41 at Kansas which tied him with Glen Mason as the second-winningest coach in school history. A.R. Kennedy owns KU's best coaching record at 52–9–4 from 1904 to 1910.

Duke vs. #22 Kansas [box score]

Team	1	2	3	4	Total
Duke	7	0	3	6	16
• #22 Kansas	7	13	17	7	44

- Date: September 19
- Location: Memorial Stadium, Lawrence, KS
- Game start: 11:06 am CDT
- Elapsed time: 3:24
- Game attendance: 50,101
- Game weather: 68 °F (20 °C), clear
- Referee: Walt Davenport
- TV announcers (Versus): Ron Thulin, Kelly Stouffer, Lewis Johnson

=== Duke ===
Kansas senior quarterback Todd Reesing threw for 338 yards and three touchdowns and also collected 51 yards on the ground to lead Kansas to a 44–16 win over Duke on a sunny Saturday afternoon at Memorial Stadium. The win improved Kansas to 3–0 on the season, marking the second time in the last three seasons the Jayhawks opened the season with three-consecutive wins. The loss dropped the Blue Devils to 1–2.

Reesing completed 28-of-41 passes against the Blue Devils, including touchdowns to three different receivers. His 338 yards in the air marked his seventh-straight game with 200 or more passing yards and his 14th career 300-yard passing game. Briscoe finished the game with 117 yards receiving, his sixth-straight 100-yard receiving game. He now has nine 100-yard receiving games in his career, the most in KU history.

Senior safety Darrell Stuckey led the Jayhawk defense with a season-high 10 tackles. Freshman linebacker Huldon Tharp recorded a career-high 10 tackles, while junior linebacker Drew Dudley finished with a career-best eight tackles. Sophomore cornerback Daymond Patterson also had eight stops. Senior nickelback Justin Thornton and junior cornerback Chris Harris each added six tackles. KU finished with five sacks on the afternoon, giving the Jayhawks 14 sacks on the season.

Southern Miss vs. #20 Kansas [box score]

Team	1	2	3	4	Total
Southern Miss	7	7	14	0	28
• #20 Kansas	14	7	7	7	35

- Date: September 26
- Location: Memorial Stadium, Lawrence, KS
- Game start: 11:10 am CDT
- Elapsed time: 3:33
- Game attendance: 50,025
- Game weather: 61 °F (16 °C), partly cloudy
- Referee: Ed Ardito
- TV announcers (FSN): Joel Meyers, Dave Lapham, Jim Knox

=== Southern Miss ===
Senior wide receiver Kerry Meier hauled in 10 passes for a career-high 141 yards and two touchdowns and senior quarterback Todd Reesing passed former Texas quarterback Vince Young for seventh on the All-time Big 12 total yards list as No. 19 Kansas defeated Southern Mississippi 35–28 at Memorial Stadium. The victory improved Kansas to 4–0 on the season, marking the second time in the last three seasons the Jayhawks opened the season with four-consecutive wins. The defeat dropped Southern Mississippi to 3–1 ending the nation's second longest winning streak at eight games.

Reesing completed 30-of-41 passes against the Golden Eagles, including touchdowns to two different receivers. His 331 yards in the air marked his eighth-straight game with 200 or more passing yards and his 15th career 300-yard passing game.

The game was a back-and-forth battle that was tied late in the game when Kansas received ideal field position for the second-straight drive after Darrell Stuckey posted a 50-yard kick return to place the ball at the Southern Miss 40-yard line just before the end of the third quarter. This time the Jayhawks took advantage of the kick return, and Reesing found Meier uncovered for a 12-yard touchdown, his second of the game, to make the score 35–28.

Both teams traded possessions before Kansas' defense forced Southern Mississippi to punt with three minutes remaining. But the Jayhawks couldn't muster a first down, giving the Golden Eagles an opportunity to tie the game. The Jayhawk defense then stepped up to the challenge as junior defensive end Jake Laptad sacked Davis on third down and sophomore cornerback Daymond Patterson batted down two passes to force a turnover on downs and seal the victory.

Iowa State vs. #16 Kansas [box score]

Team	1	2	3	4	Total
Iowa State	6	6	18	6	36
• #16 Kansas	6	14	7	14	41

- Date: October 10
- Location: Memorial Stadium, Lawrence, KS
- Game start: 11:37 am CDT
- Elapsed time: 3:22
- Game attendance: 48,203
- Game weather: 47 °F (8 °C), cloudy
- Referee: Matt Loeffler
- TV announcers (Versus): Ron Thulin, Kelly Stouffer, Lewis Johnson

=== Iowa State ===
Kansas senior wide receiver Kerry Meier set a school record with 16 receptions for 142 yards and two touchdowns, while senior quarterback Todd Reesing tied a school record with 37 completions for a career-high 442 yards and four touchdowns as No. 16 Kansas outlasted Iowa State 41–36. Before a crowd of 48,203 at Kivisto Field at Memorial Stadium, Kansas improves to 5–0 for the second time in three years, and 1–0 in Big 12 Conference play. Iowa State drops to 3–3 overall and 0–2 in league play.

Reesing's main two targets for the afternoon were Meier, with his record-setting 16 receptions and junior wide receiver Dezmon Briscoe, who had 12 catches for 186 yards and two touchdowns. Meier and Briscoe ended the day as KU's career receptions leaders with Meier first at 167 and Briscoe at 165. For Reesing, it was his second 400-yard passing day.

Despite the offensive firepower displayed by the Jayhawks, the team needed a fourth-down stop at its own 31-yard line to solidify the win. Trailing by five with 2:36 remaining in the game, ISU regained possession on its own 34-yard line and marched to the KU 31 before the Jayhawks' defense held fast to produce a turnover on downs. KU defensive back Chris Harris made a huge tackle of Iowa State receiver Jake Williams on second-and-10 and then broke up the third-down pass, resulting in a fourth-and-nine attempt for the Cyclones. On fourth down, pressure forced ISU quarterback Austen Arnuad's pass to sail incomplete.

#17 Kansas vs. Colorado [box score]

Team	1	2	3	4	Total
#17 Kansas	3	7	13	7	30
• Colorado	0	24	3	7	34

- Date: October 17
- Location: Folsom Field, Boulder, CO
- Game start: 5:11 pm MDT
- Elapsed time: 3:36
- Game attendance: 51,146
- Game weather: 68 °F (20 °C), clear
- Referee: Karl Richins
- TV announcers (FSN): Bill Land, Dave Lapham, Emily Jones

=== Colorado ===
Despite erasing a 21-point deficit, the University of Kansas football team could not pull off the win as Colorado escaped with a 34–30 victory over the Jayhawks in front of 51,146 fans in Boulder. KU dropped to 5–1 overall and 1–1 in the Big 12, while Colorado improved to 2–4 overall and 1–1 in the league. The lead changed hands twice in the fourth quarter and Kansas had the chance to win on the final play of the game. In the end, it wasn't meant to be for KU.

KU led 3–0 at the end of the first quarter only to see Colorado score 24 unanswered points. KU closed the gap to 24–10 before the first half ended, but Colorado opened the second half with a 39-yard field goal to extend their lead back to 17 points. Kansas then rallied, dominating on both sides of the ball into the early fourth quarter, scoring 20 straight points to take a 30–27 lead with 12:57 remaining in the game. Not to be outdone, the Buffaloes put together a 10-play, 76-yard touchdown drive to re-take the lead. Kansas had two more chances to score before the game ended, first on a 10-play, 74-yard drive that included a Reesing-to-Meier touchdown pass that would have given the Jayhawks the lead, only it was nullified due to an offensive pass interference call. Ultimately the Jayhawks turned the ball over on downs. They managed to force a Colorado punt and take one final possession with 24 seconds left in the game, but a heavily covered Dezmon Briscoe could not hold on to a Reesing pass in the end zone as time expired. As the game went final, the Colorado fans stormed the field.

The loss began what eventually became a 46-game losing streak for games on the road for the Jayhawks. They wouldn't win another road game until 2018.

#25 Oklahoma vs. #24 Kansas [box score]

Team	1	2	3	4	Total
• #25 Oklahoma	7	7	14	7	35
#24 Kansas	0	6	0	7	13

- Date: October 24
- Location: Memorial Stadium, Lawrence, KS
- Game start: 2:36 pm CDT
- Elapsed time: 3:10
- Game attendance: 51,104
- Game weather: 65 °F (18 °C), partly cloudy
- Referee: Cooper Castleberry
- TV announcers (ABC): Ron Franklin, Ed Cunningham

=== Oklahoma ===
Despite holding Oklahoma to just 337 yards of total offense – nearly 100 yards below the Sooners' season average – the Jayhawks suffered a 35–13 loss to OU at Kivisto Field at Memorial Stadium. The Jayhawks dropped to 5–2 overall and 1–2 in the Big 12, while the Sooners improved to 4–3 and 2–2 in league play.

Kansas quarterback Todd Reesing threw for 224 yards, but his three first-half interceptions put the Jayhawks behind 14–0 early, one of OU's touchdowns coming on an 85-yard interception return for a touchdown by Dominique Franks as Kansas was driving deep into Oklahoma territory. Kansas answered with a pair of field goals by junior kicker Jacob Branstetter, including a career-long 57-yarder just before the end of the half, but despite cutting the deficit to a single possession, the Jayhawks could not contain the Oklahoma offense in the third quarter. The Sooners opened the second half with a nine-play, 75-yard drive that culminated with a nine-yard touchdown pass from Landry Jones to senior wide receiver Adron Tennell to give the Sooners a 21–6 advantage. OU extended its lead to 28–6 on its next possession, as Chris Brown hauled in an eight-yard TD pass from Jones. After another Brown touchdown made it 35–6, the Jayhawks scored their only touchdown of the game late in fourth quarter on a run by Reesing.

Kansas vs. Texas Tech = [box score]

Team	1	2	3	4	Total
Kansas	7	7	7	0	21
• Texas Tech	0	14	0	28	42

- Date: October 31
- Location: Jones AT&T Stadium, Lubbock, TX
- Game start: 2:36 pm CDT
- Elapsed time: 3:30
- Game attendance: 47,291
- Game weather: 67 °F (19 °C), clear
- Referee: Karl Richins
- TV announcers (ABC): Ron Franklin, Ed Cunningham

=== Texas Tech ===
Four turnovers resulting in 28 Texas Tech points spoiled any chance of the University of Kansas football team picking up its sixth win as the Jayhawks fell to the Red Raiders 42–21 in front of 47,291 fans in Jones AT&T Stadium. Kansas fell to 5–3 overall while Texas Tech improved to 6–3 (3–2 Big 12). With four league games still left, KU dropped to 1–3 in the Big 12.

The first half of the game was an unexpected defensive struggle. At halftime, the teams entered the locker room tied at 14, with Texas Tech outgaining Kansas 127 yards to 106 in the half. Kansas' two first half touchdowns each came after forced fumbles, while Texas Tech was also able to capitalize off of a Kansas turnover deep in KU territory.

KU took the lead 21–14 in the closing seconds of the third quarter after orchestrating an impressive 10-play, 81-yard drive. Kansas quarterback Todd Reesing connected with Dezmon Briscoe three times on the drive including a touchdown pass from six yards out. On the play, Reesing twisted around to avoid a sack before finding Briscoe wide open in the endzone. The hookup from Reesing to Briscoe was the 26th time the pair found each other for a touchdown in their careers. No other active tandem in college football has as many touchdowns.

Texas Tech responded immediately, tying the game on 80-yard drive capped off by a one-yard touchdown run by Baron Batch. Kansas could not respond, fumbling they ball three times in their next four possessions, each inside their own 30-yard line. Texas Tech capitalized each time, returning one of the fumbles for a touchdown and scoring two other touchdowns on short drives to result in the 42–21 final score. The game began a stretch of 151 consecutive games the Jayhawks would play unranked. The streak wouldn't end until October 8, 2022.

Kansas vs. Kansas State [box score]

Team	1	2	3	4	Total
Kansas	0	7	0	3	10
• Kansas State	0	10	7	0	17

- Date: November 7
- Location: Bill Snyder Family Football Stadium, Manhattan, KS
- Game start: 11:30 am CST
- Elapsed time: 2:58
- Game attendance: 48,306
- Game weather: 64 °F (18 °C), clear
- Referee: Scott Novak
- TV announcers (Versus): Ron Thulin, Kelly Stouffer, Lewis Johnson

=== Kansas State ===
Despite a combined 168 yards receiving for KU senior Kerry Meier and junior Dezmon Briscoe, Kansas fell to Sunflower Showdown rival Kansas State, 17–10, at Bill Snyder Family Stadium. After starting the season with five consecutive wins, the Jayhawks dropped to 5–4 overall and 1–4 in the Big 12. K-State improves to 6–4 overall and 4–2 in conference play.

Kansas quarterback Todd Reesing racked up 266 yards, including 241 through the air, but committed three costly turnovers. The 10 points scored by the Kansas offense was a season low. Reesing completed 27-of-41 passes for 241 yards and a touchdown, while Meier led the receiving corps with eight catches for 92 yards. Senior running back Jake Sharp gained 35 yards on 11 carries, while Reesing ran eight times for 25 yards. Kansas freshmen Huldon Tharp and Lubbock Smith led the defense with nine tackles a piece, while Darrell Stuckey and Drew Dudley chipped in six.

Nebraska vs. Kansas [box score]

Team	1	2	3	4	Total
• Nebraska	7	3	3	18	31
Kansas	0	10	0	7	17

- Date: November 14
- Location: Memorial Stadium, Lawrence, KS
- Game start: 2:36 pm CST
- Elapsed time: 3:07
- Game attendance: 51,525
- Game weather: 53 °F (12 °C), cloudy
- Referee: Cooper Castleberry
- TV announcers (ABC): Ron Franklin, Ed Cunningham

=== Nebraska ===
After a low scoring three quarters, a fourth-quarter scoring flurry led to a 31–17 Nebraska victory against Kansas on Senior Day at Kivisto Field at Memorial Stadium. The loss dropped KU to 5–5 overall and 1–5 in Big 12 Conference action.

Kansas senior quarterback Todd Reesing found junior wide receiver Dezmon Briscoe wide open in the middle of the field and Briscoe ran it in for the score from 21 yards out to give Kansas its first lead of the day at 17–16 with 7:34 left to play. The Jayhawks' scoring drive amassed 89 yards on 10 plays capped by KU's first passing touchdown of the day.

Nebraska did not trail for long though. After a 44-yard kick-off return by Niles Paul, Nebraska quickly responded as Helu punched it in from 20 yards out just over a minute later. Nebraska quarterback Zac Lee then found Paul for the two-point conversion to push the Cornhuskers back into the lead at 24–17 with just over six minutes remaining. After a KU punt, Nebraska took possession with 5:20 remaining on the game clock and burned nearly all of that with a 10-play, 74-yard drive capped by another Helu touchdown run that gave the Cornhuskers a two-touchdown lead with only 23 seconds left in the game.

Reesing finished the game 19-of-41 passing for 236 yards and one touchdown. He also turned in 42 yards rushing and a second touchdown. Kerry Meier led the Jayhawks in receiving with 10 catches for 127 yards, while Briscoe had four catches for 77 yards and a TD. Freshman running back Toben Opurum recorded 43 yards on the ground on 15 carries.

Kansas vs. #2 Texas [box score]

Team	1	2	3	4	Total
Kansas	0	6	7	7	20
• #2 Texas	7	20	7	17	51

- Date: 2009-11-21
- Location: Darrell K Royal–Texas Memorial Stadium, Austin, TX
- Game start: 7:13 pm CST
- Elapsed time: 3:29
- Game attendance: 101,357
- Game weather: 56 °F (13 °C), overcast
- Referee: Tom Walker
- TV announcers (ABC): Ron Franklin, Ed Cunningham

=== Texas ===
Despite 245 all-purpose yards from junior Dezmon Briscoe, the Kansas football team could not keep up with the high-powered Texas offense as the No. 3 Longhorns defeated the Jayhawks 51–20 before a sellout crowd of 101,357 at Texas Memorial Stadium. Kansas dropped to 5–6 on the season, including 1–6 in Big 12 play. Texas improved to 11–0 on the season and 7–0 in conference play. The Longhorns’ win secured them the Big 12 South title.

For the game, Texas rolled up 532 yards total offense, while Kansas had 303 yards. Playing in his hometown of Austin, Texas, KU quarterback Todd Reesing ended the game 25 for 39 for 256 yards. Briscoe had five catches for 101 yards, while senior Kerry Meier had a team-high nine receptions 46 yards. Briscoe returned three kickoffs 144 yards, including a 98-yarder for a touchdown in the third quarter to make the score 44–20.

Colt McCoy led the Longhorns’ offensive charge by completing 32 passes on 41 attempts for 396 yards and four touchdowns. UT wide receiver James Kirkendoll had eight catches for 86 yards and two touchdowns, while senior Jordan Shipley had 10 receptions for 108 yards and one score.

Missouri vs. Kansas [box score]

Team	1	2	3	4	Total
• Missouri	3	10	20	8	41
Kansas	14	7	7	11	39

- Date: November 28
- Location: Arrowhead Stadium, Kansas City, MO
- Game start: 2:36 pm CST
- Elapsed time: 3:42
- Game attendance: 70,072
- Game weather: 66 °F (19 °C), sunny
- Referee: Scott Novak
- TV announcers (ABC): Dave Lamont, JC Pearson

=== Missouri ===
Despite a record-breaking day for senior quarterback Todd Reesing, Kansas fell to Missouri 41–39 after Reesing was sacked in the final seconds of the annual Border War game at Arrowhead Stadium in Kansas City. Reesing set a school record for passing yards in a single game with 498 and tied his own school record for completions in a game with 37. Kansas concluded its 2009 season at 5–7 overall and 1–7 in the Big 12, while Missouri improved to 8–4 overall and 4–4 in league play.

The 118th edition of the Border War was a hard-fought battle, with the winner determined in the final seconds as MU kicker Grant Ressel hit a 27-yard field goal as time expired.

== Rankings ==
Ranking movements Legend: ██ Increase in ranking ██ Decrease in ranking — = Not ranked RV = Received votes
	Week															
Poll	Pre	1	2	3	4	5	6	7	8	9	10	11	12	13	14	Final
AP	25	24	22	20	18	16	17	24	RV	—						
Coaches	RV	25	23	19	16	15	15	21	RV	—						
Harris	Not released				16	16	16	21	RV	—						Not released
BCS	Not released							25	—							Not released

== Awards and honors ==
Drew Dudley

- Big 12 Conference Chick-Fil-A Fall Community of Champions honoree
- ESPN The Magazine Academic First Team All-District 7

Maxwell Onyegbule

- Big 12 Co-Defensive Player of the Week (Week 2)

Todd Reesing

- ESPN The Magazine Academic First Team All-District 7
- National Football Foundation National Scholar-Athlete
- All Big 12 Honorable Mention
- Cambell Trophy Finalist

Alonso Rojas

- Ray Guy Award Candidate
- All Big 12 Honorable Mention

Darrell Stuckey

- Allstate AFCA Good Works Team
- Jim Thorpe Award Finalist
- All Big 12 Honorable Mention

Dezmon Briscoe

- All Big 12 First Team

Kerry Meier

- All Big 12 Second Team

Tanner Hawkinson

- All Big 12 Honorable Mention

Jake Laptad

- All Big 12 Honorable Mention

== Statistics ==
=== Team ===
	Team	Opp
Scoring	294	249
Points per Game	29.4	24.9
First downs	240	188
Rushing	87	79
Passing	137	93
Penalty	16	16
Total offense	4219	3514
Avg per Play	5.7	5.2
Avg per Game	421.9	351.4
Fumbles-Lost	18–10	15–8
Penalties-Yards	58–489	60–585
Avg per Game	48.9	58.5

	Team	Opp
Punts-Yards	46-1898	54-2209
Avg per Punt	41.3	40.9
Time of possession/Game	31:15	28:45
3rd down conversions	62/147	57/149
4th down conversions	11/14	8/17
Touchdowns scored	38	32
Field goals-Attempts-Long	10–15–57	9–11–47
PAT-Attempts	36–38	26–28
Attendance	303,488	178,628
Games/Avg per Game	50,581	44,657

==== Scores by quarter ====
	1	2	3	4	Total
Kansas	47	109	58	80	294
Opponents	34	71	65	79	249

=== Offense ===
==== Rushing ====
Name	GP	Att	Gain	Loss	Net	Avg	TD	Long	Avg/G
Toben Opurum	10	131	564	23	541	4.1	9	26	54.1
Jake Sharp	8	86	382	4	378	4.4	3	30	47.2
Kale Pick	7	14	182	15	167	11.9	0	55	23.9
Todd Reesing	10	87	379	245	134	1.5	5	22	13.4
Dezmon Briscoe	9	2	20	1	19	9.5	1	20	2.1
Rell Lewis	3	5	17	0	17	3.4	0	8	5.7
Kerry Meier	10	1	6	0	6	6.0	0	6	0.8
TEAM	6	8	0	13	−13	−1.6	0	0	−2.2
Total	10	334	1550	301	1249	3.7	18	55	124.9
Opponents	10	338	1581	308	1273	3.8	18	44	127.3

==== Passing ====
Name	GP	Effic	Att-Cmp-Int	Pct	Yds	TD	Lng	Avg/G
Todd Reesing	10	133.0	402–251–8	62.4	2862	18	71	286.2
Kale Pick	7	117.0	5–4–0	80.0	22	0	6	4.4
Kerry Meier	10	262.7	3–2–0	66.7	70	0	56	8.8
Alonso Rojas	10	234.4	1–1–0	100.0	16	0	16	2.0
TEAM	6	0.0	1–0–0	0.0	0	0	0	0.0
Total	10	133.7	412–258–8	62.6	2970	18	71	297.0
Opponents	10	123.2	340–205–7	60.3	2241	12	75	224.1

==== Receiving ====
Name	GP	No.	Yds	Avg	TD	Long	Avg/G
Kerry Meier	10	83	885	10.7	6	71	88.5
Dezmon Briscoe	9	65	994	15.3	7	56	110.4
Johnathan Wilson	10	32	385	12.0	0	33	38.5
Bradley McDougald	10	28	263	9.4	0	42	26.3
Jake Sharp	8	24	182	7.6	3	56	22.8
Toben Opurum	10	13	105	8.1	1	30	10.5
Tim Biere	9	9	117	13.0	0	19	13.0
Tertavian Ingram	7	2	27	13.5	1	16	5.4
Todd Reesing	10	1	14	14.0	0	14	1.8
Rell Lewis	3	1	−2	−2.0	0	0	−0.7
Total	10	258	2970	11.5	18	71	297.0
Opponents	10	205	2241	10.9	12	75	224.1

=== Defense ===
Name	GP	Tackles				Sacks	Pass defense		Interceptions				Fumbles		Blkd Kick
Name	GP	Solo	Ast	Total	TFL-Yds	No-Yds	BrUp	QBH	No.-Yds	Avg	TD	Long	Rcv-Yds	FF	Blkd Kick
Total	10	413	291	704	67–296	26–205	34	37	7–90	12.9	1	48	8–8	9	0

=== Special teams ===
Name	Punting								Kickoffs				
Name	No.	Yds	Avg	Long	TB	FC	I20	Blkd	No.	Yds	Avg	TB	OB
Alonso Rojas	45	1869	41.5	72	5	8	15	0	0	0	0	0	0
Jacob Branstetter	1	29	29.0	29	0	0	1	0	56	3535	63.1	8	0
Total	46	1898	41.3	72	5	8	16	0	56	3535	63.1	8	0

Name	Punt returns					Kick returns				
Name	No.	Yds	Avg	TD	Long	No.	Yds	Avg	TD	Long
Daymond Patterson	19	132	6.9	0	49	0	0	0.0	0	0
Bradley McDougald	3	3	1.0	0	2	20	384	19.2	0	47
Dezmon Briscoe	0	0	0.0	0	0	13	239	18.4	0	33
Darrell Stuckey	0	0	0.0	0	0	6	192	32.0	0	67
Johnathan Wilson	0	0	0.0	0	0	0	1	0.0	0	1
Total	22	134	6.1	0	49	39	816	20.9	0	67
