= 2009 UCF Knights football team =

American college football season

2009 UCF Knights football

St. Petersburg Bowl, L 45–24 vs. Rutgers
- Conference: Conference USA
- East
- Record: 8–5 (6–2 C-USA)
- Head coach: George O'Leary (6th season)
- Offensive coordinator: Charlie Taaffe (1st season)
- Defensive coordinator: Dave Huxtable (2nd season)
- Home stadium: Bright House Networks Stadium

2009 Conference USA football standings
	Conf.			Overall
Team	W		L	W		L
East Division
East Carolina x$	7	–	1	9	–	5
UCF	6	–	2	8	–	5
Southern Miss	5	–	3	7	–	6
Marshall	4	–	4	7	–	6
UAB	4	–	4	5	–	7
Memphis	1	–	7	2	–	10
West Division
Houston xy	6	–	2	10	–	4
SMU x	6	–	2	8	–	5
Tulsa	3	–	5	5	–	7
UTEP	3	–	5	4	–	8
Rice	2	–	6	2	–	10
Tulane	1	–	7	3	–	9
Championship: East Carolina 38, Houston 32
$ – Conference champion; x – Division champion/co-champions; y – Championship game participant; Rankings from AP Poll

The 2009 UCF Knights football team represented the University of Central Florida in the 2009 NCAA Division I FBS football season. Their head coach was George O'Leary, in his sixth season with the team. Coaching changes included new offensive coordinator Charlie Taaffe. For the third season, the UCF Knights played all of their home games at Bright House Networks Stadium on the school's main campus in Orlando, Florida.

All games were broadcast live on the UCF-ISP Sports radio network. The flagship was WYGM "740 The Game" in Orlando, which had returned to a sports talk format after a year's absence but retained UCF's rights throughout. The games were called by Marc Daniels (play-by-play) and Gary Parris (color commentary), with Scott Adams and Jerry O'Neill as field reporters.

For the season, the Knights had an 8–5 record, 6–2 in Conference USA, and placed second in the Eastern Division. The Knights finished the season with a six-game conference winning streak, after starting conference play 0–2. The season included a 37–32 Homecoming win over the Houston Cougars, who were ranked #12 in the Coaches' Poll, marking the first time in program history that the Knights had defeated a ranked opponent. For the third time in five years, the Knights became bowl eligible and lost to Rutgers in the St. Petersburg Bowl.

== Schedule ==
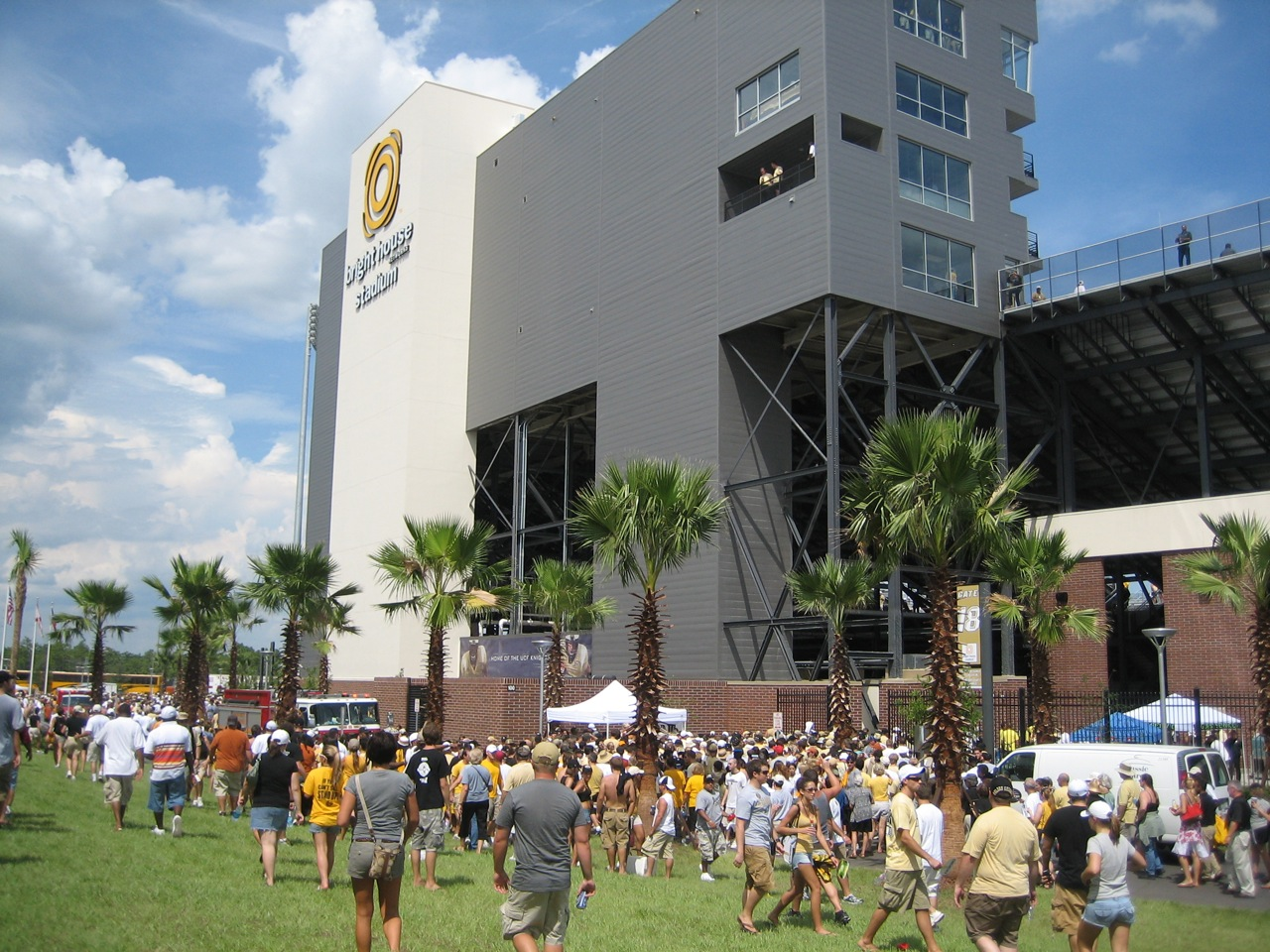
Bright House Networks Stadium, the Knights home field

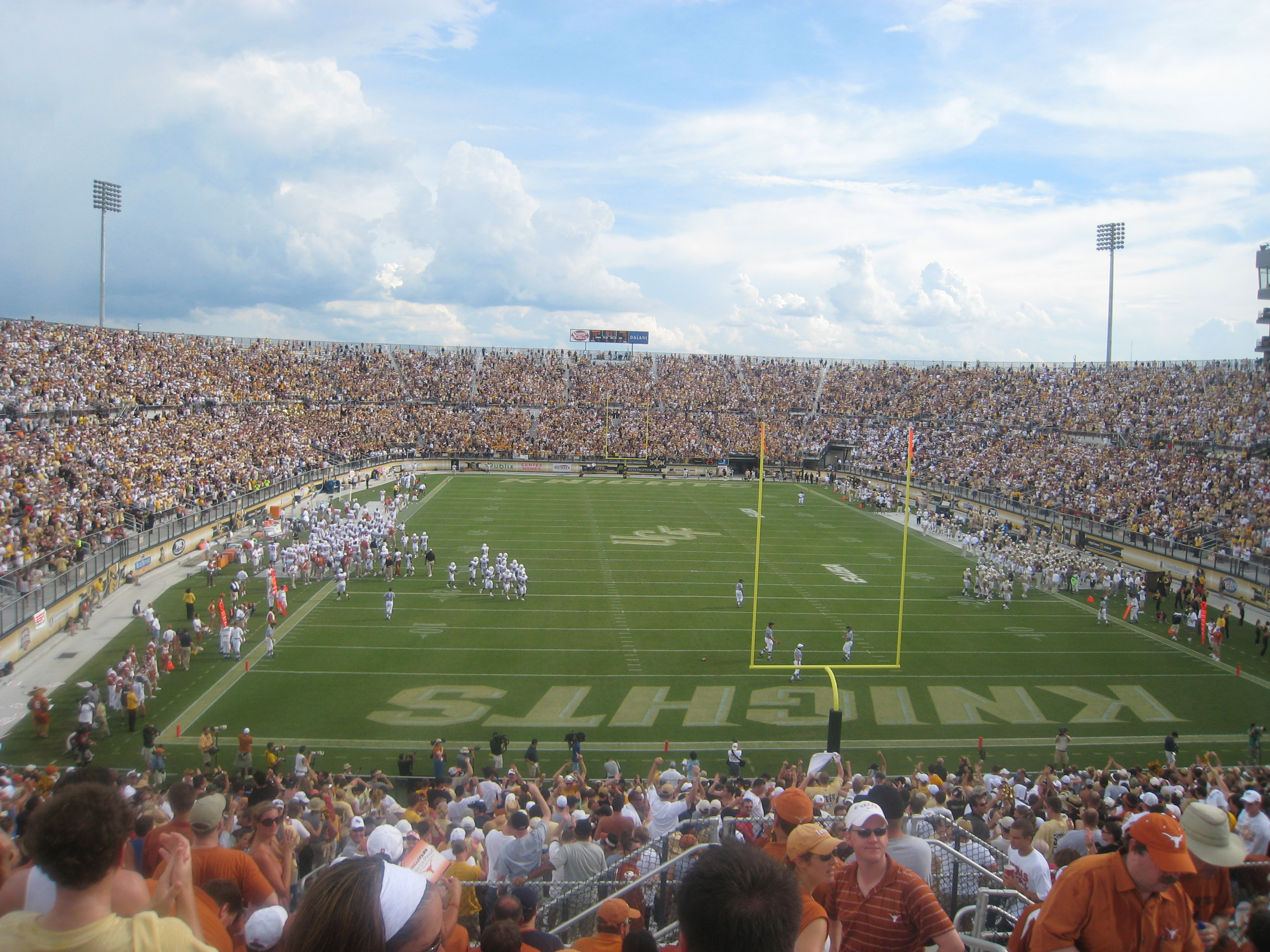
The field at Bright House Networks Stadium

Date	Time	Opponent	Site	TV	Result	Attendance	Source
September 5	7:30 pm	Samford*	Bright House Networks Stadium; Orlando, FL	BHSN	W 28–24	34,486	
September 12	7:00 pm	at Southern Miss	M. M. Roberts Stadium; Hattiesburg, MS		L 19–26	27,456	
September 19	7:30 pm	Buffalo*	Bright House Networks Stadium; Orlando, FL	BHSN	W 23–17	33,689	
September 26	3:30 pm	at East Carolina	Dowdy–Ficklen Stadium; Greenville, NC	BHSN	L 14–19	43,210	
October 3	3:30 pm	Memphis	Bright House Networks Stadium; Orlando, FL	BHSN	W 32–14	40,408	
October 17	7:30 pm	No. 9 Miami (FL)*	Bright House Networks Stadium; Orlando, FL	CBSCS	L 7–27	48,453	
October 24	3:30 pm	at Rice	Rice Stadium; Houston, TX		W 49–7	10,196	
November 1	8:15 pm	Marshall	Bright House Networks Stadium; Orlando, FL	ESPN	W 21–20	35,676	
November 7	12:00 pm	at No. 2 Texas*	Darrell K Royal–Texas Memorial Stadium; Austin, TX	FSN	L 3–35	101,003	
November 14	12:00 pm	No. 13 Houston^{†}	Bright House Networks Stadium; Orlando, FL	CBSCS	W 37–32	34,437	
November 21	2:00 pm	Tulane	Bright House Networks Stadium; Orlando, FL	BHSN	W 49–0	31,390	
November 28	1:30 pm	at UAB	Legion Field; Birmingham, AL		W 34–27	13,381	
December 19	8:00 pm	vs. Rutgers	Tropicana Field; St. Petersburg, FL (St. Petersburg Bowl)	ESPN	L 24–45	29,763	
*Non-conference game; ^{†}Homecoming; Rankings from AP Poll released prior to the game; All times are in Eastern time

== Game summaries ==
=== Samford ===
	1	2	3	4	Total
Bulldogs	0	7	17	0	24
Knights	0	7	14	7	28

UCF and Samford last met for a Homecoming game in the 1990s.

=== Southern Miss ===
	1	2	3	4	Total
Knights	0	10	0	9	19
Golden Eagles	14	6	0	6	26

UCF and Southern Miss last met in Orlando on November 8, 2008. UCF lost the game 17-6.

=== Buffalo ===
	1	2	3	4	Total
Bulls	0	17	0	0	17
Knights	7	0	10	6	23

UCF and Buffalo last met in Orlando in 2003.

=== East Carolina ===
	1	2	3	4	Total
Knights	7	0	0	7	14
Pirates	3	7	3	6	19

UCF and East Carolina last met in Orlando on November 2, 2008. East Carolina won the game in overtime 13–10.

=== Memphis ===
	1	2	3	4	Total
Tigers	0	7	7	0	14
Knights	0	3	12	17	32

UCF and Memphis last met in Memphis on November 22, 2008. UCF won the game 28–21.

=== Miami ===
	1	2	3	4	Total
#9 Hurricanes	7	3	10	7	27
Knights	0	0	7	0	7

UCF and Miami met for the first time on October 11, 2008 in Miami. Miami won the game 20–14.

There were 48,453 fans on hand to watch the game, which was the largest crowd to watch a football game at Bright House Networks Stadium.

=== Rice ===
	1	2	3	4	Total
Knights	21	7	14	7	49
Owls	0	0	0	7	7

UCF and Rice last met in 2006.

=== Marshall ===
	1	2	3	4	Total
Thundering Herd	0	17	3	0	20
Knights	0	7	0	14	21

UCF and Marshall last met on November 15, 2008 in Huntington. UCF won the game 30–14. UCF is 5–3 all time versus Marshall. Marshall was leading 20-7 with less than 8 minutes to go in the game, but UCF staged a comeback to win the game 21-20.

=== Texas ===
	1	2	3	4	Total
Knights	0	3	0	0	3
#2 Longhorns	0	14	7	14	35

UCF and Texas last met on September 15, 2007 for the inaugural game at Bright House Networks Stadium in Orlando. #8 Texas won the game 35–32.

=== Houston ===
	1	2	3	4	Total
#12 Cougars	10	7	0	15	32
Knights	0	10	13	14	37

UCF and Houston last met on October 28, 2006 in Houston. The Cougars won the game 51–31. This was the first time in the program's history that the Knights proved victorious over a ranked opponent. UCF is now 20–10 all time on Homecoming weekend.

=== Tulane ===
	1	2	3	4	Total
Green Wave	0	0	0	0	0
Knights	7	7	28	7	49

UCF and Tulane last met in 2006 in New Orleans. The Green Wave won the game.

=== UAB ===
	1	2	3	4	Total
Knights	10	14	7	3	34
Blazers	7	7	0	13	27

UCF and UAB last met on November 29, 2008 in Orlando. The Blazers won the game 15–0.

=== St. Petersburg Bowl ===
	1	2	3	4	Total
Knights	7	10	0	7	24
Scarlet Knights	14	14	10	7	45

UCF had been bowl eligible for three of the past five seasons. UCF was 0–3 in bowl games until this point. This game marked the first meeting between the two teams.

== Personnel ==
=== Coaching staff ===
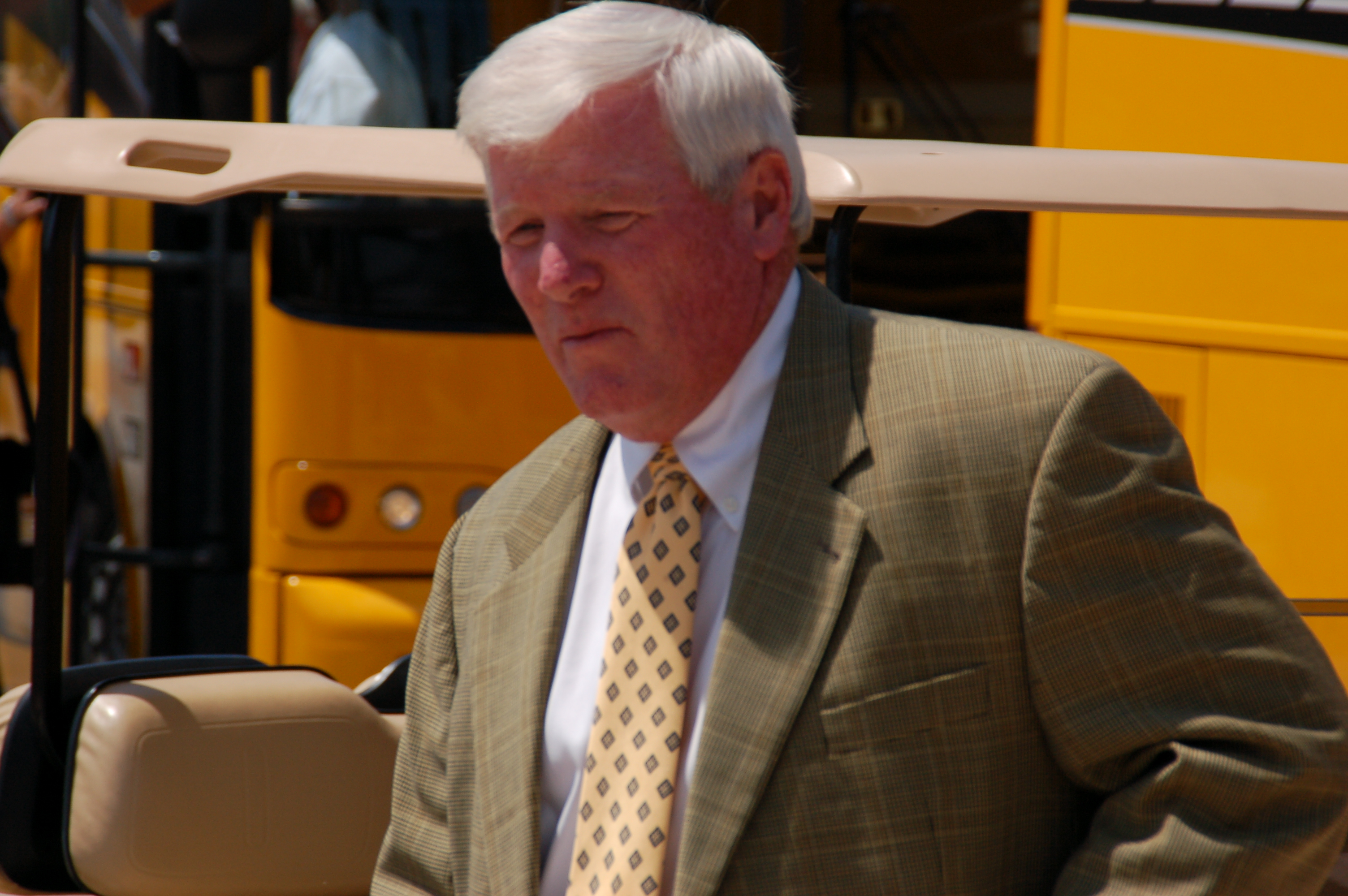
Head coach George O'Leary

On January 5, 2009, UCF hired Charlie Taaffe to be the team's new Offensive coordinator. The change occurred amid a staff shake-up by Head Coach George O'Leary after a disappointing 2008 season. Tim Salem, whom Taaffe replaced, will transition to being the tight-ends coach and special-teams coordinator, 2008 quarterbacks coach George Godsey will move to be the running-backs coach, and Brent Key will move from being the tight-ends coach and special-teams coordinator to offensive-line coach.

=== Recruiting class ===
Name	Position	Height	Weight	State	High School/Junior College
Corey Ammons	-	6-1	275	Florida	Archbishop Carroll
A. J. Bouye	WR/ CB	6-0	180	Georgia	Tucker
Jamie Boyle	PK	5-10	193	New York	Monroe Woodbury
D.J. Brown	TE	6-4	225	Florida	Dunnellon
Brandon Bryant	DL	6-3	230	Georgia	Washington
Frankie Davis	DL	6-3	240	Florida	East Ridge
Jonathan Davis	RB/ LB	5-9	195	Georgia	Tucker
Troy Davis	LB	6-2	217	Georgia	Berkmar
Nico Flores	DL/ QB	6-2	199	Florida	North Miami Beach
Dontravious Floyd	WR	6-3	203	Florida	South Dade
Victor Gray	DL	6-4	235	Florida	Dr. Phillips
Javen Harris	LB	7-2	223	Alabama	Eufaula
Tay Irvin	DT	6-0	310	Georgia	Troup County
Kemal Ishmael	WR/DB	5-11	197	Florida	North Miami Beach
Abre Leggins	DT	6-3	280	Florida	Westwood HS
Quincy McDuffie	WR	5-10	160	Florida	Edgewater
Deon Simon	DT	6-4	280	Louisiana	Glen Oaks
Jarrett Swaby	WR/DB	6-1	189	Florida	Glades Day
Jim Teknipp	TE	6-5	225	Georgia	Henry County
Leon Woods	WR	-	-	Florida	Lake Gibson
Henry Wright	DB	6-1	185	Florida	Edgewater
