= 2009 UTEP Miners football team =

American college football season

2009 UTEP Miners football
- Conference: Conference USA
- West Division
- Record: 4–8 (3–5 C-USA)
- Head coach: Mike Price (6th season)
- Offensive coordinator: Bob Connelly (2nd season)
- Offensive scheme: Spread
- Defensive coordinator: Osia Lewis (2nd season)
- Base defense: 3–3–5
- Home stadium: Sun Bowl

2009 Conference USA football standings
	Conf.			Overall
Team	W		L	W		L
East Division
East Carolina x$	7	–	1	9	–	5
UCF	6	–	2	8	–	5
Southern Miss	5	–	3	7	–	6
Marshall	4	–	4	7	–	6
UAB	4	–	4	5	–	7
Memphis	1	–	7	2	–	10
West Division
Houston xy	6	–	2	10	–	4
SMU x	6	–	2	8	–	5
Tulsa	3	–	5	5	–	7
UTEP	3	–	5	4	–	8
Rice	2	–	6	2	–	10
Tulane	1	–	7	3	–	9
Championship: East Carolina 38, Houston 32
$ – Conference champion; x – Division champion/co-champions; y – Championship game participant; Rankings from AP Poll

The 2009 UTEP Miners football team represented the University of Texas at El Paso (UTEP) as a member of the West Division in Conference USA (C-USA) during the 2009 NCAA Division I FCS football season. Led by sixth-year head coach Mike Price, the Miners compiled an overall record of 4–8 with a mark of 3–5 in conference play, tying for third place in the C-USA's West Division. The team played home games at the Sun Bowl in El Paso, Texas.

UTEP averaged 29,010 fans per game.

== Schedule ==
Date	Time	Opponent	Site	TV	Result	Attendance	Source
September 5	7:00 pm	Buffalo*	Sun Bowl; El Paso, TX	CBSCS	L 17–23	35,213	
September 12	5:30 pm	No. 24 Kansas*	Sun Bowl; El Paso, TX	CBSCS	L 7–34	31,885	
September 19	6:00 pm	at New Mexico State*	Aggie Memorial Stadium; Las Cruces, NM (Battle of I-10)	ESPN360	W 38–12	20,439	
September 26	1:30 pm	at No. 2 Texas*	Darrell K Royal–Texas Memorial Stadium; Austin, TX	FSN	L 7–64	101,144	
October 3	7:00 pm	No. 12 Houston^{†}	Sun Bowl; El Paso, TX		W 58–41	26,793	
October 10	7:05 pm	at Memphis	Liberty Bowl Memorial Stadium; Memphis, TN		L 20–35	18,284	
October 21	6:00 pm	Tulsa	Sun Bowl; El Paso, TX	ESPN	W 28–24	37,368	
October 31	1:00 pm	UAB	Sun Bowl; El Paso, TX		L 33–38	23,063	
November 7	1:00 pm	at Tulane	Louisiana Superdome; New Orleans, LA		L 38–45 ^{OT}	16,791	
November 14	1:00 pm	at SMU	Gerald J. Ford Stadium; Dallas, TX		L 31–35	21,697	
November 21	1:30 pm	at Rice	Rice Stadium; Houston, TX		L 29–30	10,116	
November 28	1:00 pm	Marshall	Sun Bowl; El Paso, TX		W 52–21	19,736	
*Non-conference game; ^{†}Homecoming; Rankings from Coaches' Poll released prior to the game; All times are in Mountain time

== Recruiting ==
UTEP's class of 20 players included 14 who are graduating from Texas high schools in 2009. The most notable of these players was Darren Mickens, the nephew of former National Football League (NFL) cornerback Ray Mickens.

== Game summaries ==
=== Buffalo ===
	1	2	3	4	Total
Bulls	0	16	7	0	23
Miners	7	0	7	3	17

=== Kansas ===
	1	2	3	4	Total
#24 Jayhawks	3	17	7	7	34
Miners	0	0	0	7	7

=== New Mexico State ===
	1	2	3	4	Total
Miners	7	7	17	7	38
Aggies	0	0	0	12	12

=== Texas ===
	1	2	3	4	Total
Miners	7	0	0	0	7
#2 Longhorns	23	24	10	7	64

=== Houston ===
	1	2	3	4	Total
#12 Cougars	10	7	3	21	41
Miners	3	14	20	21	58

=== Memphis ===
	1	2	3	4	Total
Miners	3	10	0	7	20
Tigers	14	7	0	14	35

=== Tulsa ===
	1	2	3	4	Total
Golden Hurricane	0	7	10	7	24
Miners	13	0	0	15	28

=== UAB ===
	1	2	3	4	Total
Blazers	7	21	3	7	38
Miners	0	17	3	13	33

=== Tulane ===
	1	2	3	4	OT	Total
Miners	7	10	7	14	0	38
Green Wave	10	7	7	14	7	45

=== SMU ===
	1	2	3	4	Total
Miners	7	3	14	7	31
Mustangs	7	14	0	14	35

=== Rice ===
	1	2	3	4	Total
Miners	13	7	3	6	29
Owls	0	10	7	13	30

=== Marshall ===
	1	2	3	4	Total
Thundering Herd	0	14	7	0	21
Miners	13	7	22	10	52

The Miners finished the season ranked #102 according to the CBS Sportsline College Football Rankings Website as of December 7, 2009.
