= 2009 Tulane Green Wave football team =

American college football season

2009 Tulane Green Wave football
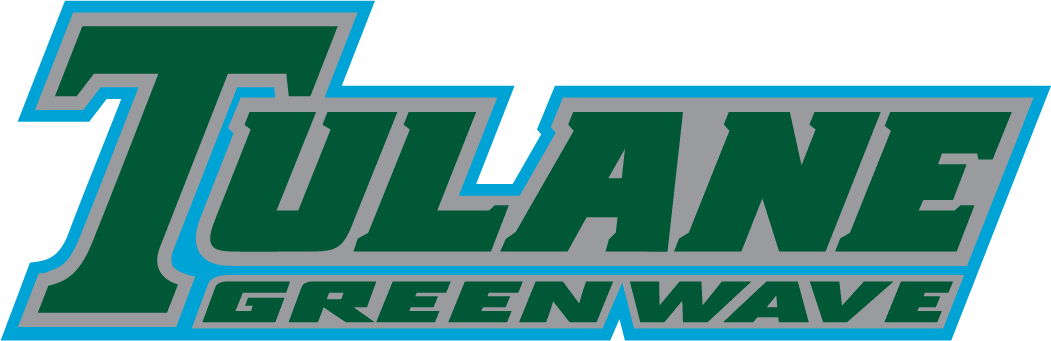
- Conference: Conference USA
- West
- Record: 3–9 (1–7 C-USA)
- Head coach: Bob Toledo (3rd season)
- Offensive coordinator: Dan Dodd (3rd season)
- Offensive scheme: West Coast
- Defensive coordinator: Steve Stanard (1st season)
- Base defense: 4–3
- Home stadium: Louisiana Superdome

2009 Conference USA football standings
	Conf.			Overall
Team	W		L	W		L
East Division
East Carolina x$	7	–	1	9	–	5
UCF	6	–	2	8	–	5
Southern Miss	5	–	3	7	–	6
Marshall	4	–	4	7	–	6
UAB	4	–	4	5	–	7
Memphis	1	–	7	2	–	10
West Division
Houston xy	6	–	2	10	–	4
SMU x	6	–	2	8	–	5
Tulsa	3	–	5	5	–	7
UTEP	3	–	5	4	–	8
Rice	2	–	6	2	–	10
Tulane	1	–	7	3	–	9
Championship: East Carolina 38, Houston 32
$ – Conference champion; x – Division champion/co-champions; y – Championship game participant; Rankings from AP Poll

The 2009 Tulane Green Wave football team represented Tulane University in the 2009 NCAA Division I FBS football season. It was the Green Wave's third year under head coach Bob Toledo. The Green Wave finished the season 3–9 and 1–7 in CUSA play.

== Offseason ==
- January 10: Bob Toledo announced the hiring of Steve Stanard as the defensive coordinator for the Green Wave. Stanard is 42 and brings 18 years of defensive experience. Prior to Tulane, Stanard spent 14 years as a defensive coordinator at Colorado State, New Mexico State, South Dakota and Nebraska Wesleyan. His teams have participated in nine bowl games. He inherited a Green Wave defensive unit that returned 21 letterwinners, including six starters for the 2009 season.
- March 19: Defensive end Reggie Scott was granted a sixth year of eligibility by the NCAA as a result of a medical hardship. Scott is a 6-4, 260-pound defensive end from Charlotte, N.C., and is a three-year letterwinner and two-year starter. He earned honorable mention All C-USA merits for the second straight year last season. Scott was a starter for 11 games and registered 31 tackles (25 solo), including 6.5 stops for lost yardage (35), and two sacks. He recorded his first career interception vs. #14 East Carolina, finished with a season-high six stops (5 unassisted) at Tulsa and recorded quarterback sacks vs. #14 East Carolina and SMU.
- April 24: Former Tulane star and current NFL running back Matt Forte was selected as a recipient of the 2009 Brian Piccolo Award. The Award was presented at Halas Hall in Chicago.

== Preseason ==
The Green Wave came off a 2–10 season in 2008.

== Schedule ==
Date	Time	Opponent	Site	TV	Result	Attendance
September 4	7:00 pm	Tulsa	Louisiana Superdome; New Orleans, LA	ESPN	L 13–37	27,638
September 12	2:30 pm	No. 9 BYU*	Louisiana Superdome; New Orleans, LA	ESPN2	L 3–54	26,224
September 26	2:30 pm	McNeese State*	Louisiana Superdome; New Orleans, LA		W 42–32	29,028
October 3	11:00 am	at Army*	Michie Stadium; West Point, NY	CBS C	W 17–16	26,076
October 10	2:30 pm	Marshall^{†}	Louisiana Superdome; New Orleans, LA		L 10–31	28,312
October 17	2:30 pm	No. 23 Houston	Louisiana Superdome; New Orleans, LA	CBS C	L 16–44	22,891
October 24	6:00 pm	at Southern Miss	M. M. Roberts Stadium; Hattiesburg, MS (Battle for the Bell)		L 6–43	30,541
October 31	7:00 pm	at No. 9 LSU*	Tiger Stadium; Baton Rouge, LA (Battle for the Rag)		L 0–42	92,031
November 7	2:30 pm	UTEP	Louisiana Superdome; New Orleans, LA		W 45–38 ^{OT}	16,791
November 14	2:30 pm	at Rice	Rice Stadium; Houston, TX		L 20–28	14,728
November 21	1:00 pm	at UCF	Bright House Networks Stadium; Orlando, FL		L 0–49	31,390
November 28	2:00 pm	at SMU	Gerald J. Ford Stadium; University Park, TX		L 21–26	20,335
*Non-conference game; ^{†}Homecoming; Rankings from AP Poll released prior to the game; All times are in Central time

== Roster ==
2009 Tulane Green Wave football team roster
Players
Coaches
Offense

Pos.	#	Name	Class
RB	32	André Anderson	Sr
WR	3	Ryan Grant	Fr
QB	11	Ryan Griffin	Fr
QB	7	Joe Kemp	So
QB	2	Kevin Moore	Jr

Defense

Pos.	#	Name	Class
CB	8	Alex Wacha	Jr

Special teams

Pos.	#	Name	Class

Head coach

- Bob Toledo

Coordinators/assistant coaches

- Jason Rollins
  (Defensive backs coach)

Legend

- (C) Team captain
- (S) Suspended
- (I) Ineligible
- Injured
- Redshirt

Roster
