= 2009 UAB Blazers football team =

American college football season

2009 UAB Blazers football
- Conference: Conference USA
- East Division
- Record: 5–7 (4–4 C-USA)
- Head coach: Neil Callaway (3rd season)
- Offensive coordinator: Kim Helton (3rd season)
- Offensive scheme: Pro spread
- Defensive coordinator: Eric Schumann (3rd season)
- Base defense: 4–3
- Home stadium: Legion Field

2009 Conference USA football standings
	Conf.			Overall
Team	W		L	W		L
East Division
East Carolina x$	7	–	1	9	–	5
UCF	6	–	2	8	–	5
Southern Miss	5	–	3	7	–	6
Marshall	4	–	4	7	–	6
UAB	4	–	4	5	–	7
Memphis	1	–	7	2	–	10
West Division
Houston xy	6	–	2	10	–	4
SMU x	6	–	2	8	–	5
Tulsa	3	–	5	5	–	7
UTEP	3	–	5	4	–	8
Rice	2	–	6	2	–	10
Tulane	1	–	7	3	–	9
Championship: East Carolina 38, Houston 32
$ – Conference champion; x – Division champion/co-champions; y – Championship game participant; Rankings from AP Poll

The 2009 UAB Blazers football team represented the University of Alabama at Birmingham (UAB) as a member of the East Division in Conference USA (C-USA) during the 2009 NCAA Division I FBS football season. Led by third-year head coach Neil Callaway, the Blazers compiled an overall record of 5–7 with a mark of 4–4 in conference play, tying for fourth place in C-USA's East Division. The team played home games at Legion Field in Birmingham, Alabama.

== Schedule ==
Date	Time	Opponent	Site	TV	Result	Attendance	Source
September 5	3:00 p.m.	Rice	Legion Field; Birmingham, AL	CSS	W 44–24	14,316	
September 12	3:00 p.m.	SMU	Legion Field; Birmingham, AL		L 33–35	18,082	
September 19	2:30 p.m.	at Troy*	Movie Gallery Stadium; Troy, AL	CSS, WABM	L 14–27	21,182	
September 26	6:00 p.m.	at Texas A&M*	Kyle Field; College Station, TX		L 19–56	74,656	
October 1	7:00 p.m.	Southern Miss	Legion Field; Birmingham, AL	CBSCS	W 30–17	26,871	
October 17	6:00 p.m.	at Ole Miss*	Vaught–Hemingway Stadium; Oxford, MS	FSN	L 13–48	47,612	
October 24	11:00 a.m.	at Marshall	Joan C. Edwards Stadium; Huntington, WV	CSS	L 7–27	18,878	
October 31	3:00 p.m.	at UTEP	Sun Bowl; El Paso, TX		W 38–33	23,063	
November 7	1:00 p.m.	Florida Atlantic*	Legion Field; Birmingham, AL		W 56–29	17,283	
November 14	12:00 p.m.	at Memphis	Liberty Bowl Memorial Stadium; Memphis, TN (Battle for the Bones)	CSS	W 31–21	18,031	
November 21	2:30 p.m.	at East Carolina	Dowdy–Ficklen Stadium; Greenville, NC	MASN	L 21–37	43,056	
November 28	12:30 p.m.	UCF	Legion Field; Birmingham, AL	CBS C	L 27–34	13,381	
*Non-conference game; All times are in Central time

== Game summaries ==
=== Rice ===
Team	1	2	3	4	Total
Rice	0	3	14	7	24
• UAB	7	20	14	3	44

- Location: Legion Field, Birmingham, Alabama
- Game start: 3:07 p.m.
- Elapsed time: 3:05
- Game attendance: 14,316
- Game weather: 77 °F (25 °C), Cloudy, humid
- Referee: Bill Athan
- TV announcers (CSS): Matt Stewart, Chuck Oliver, Melissa Lee

To open the 2009 season, UAB quarterback Joe Webb would have a record setting day in leading the Blazers to this 44–24 victory over the Owls. For the game, Webb would set both a school and Conference USA record for rushing yards by a quarterback in a single game with 194. For the game, Webb would also complete 12 of 15 passes for another 221 yards and a pair of touchdowns in gaining 415 yards of total offense on the afternoon. For his efforts, Webb was named Conference USA Offensive Player of the Week.

=== SMU ===
Team	1	2	3	4	Total
• SMU	14	14	0	7	35
UAB	0	7	20	6	33

- Location: Legion Field, Birmingham, Alabama
- Game start: 3:00 p.m.
- Elapsed time: 3:27
- Game attendance: 18,082
- Game weather: 84 °F (29 °C), Partly sunny, muggy
- Referee: Claur Gausman

Following an opening week win, the Blazers would fall by a final score of 33–35 to the Mustangs of SMU. After falling behind by a score of 28–7 at the half, the Blazers would rally to within a point of SMU by the end of the third quarter. The Blazers would fall late in the fourth following a failed two-point conversion that would have tied the game at 35 with 00:13 remaining in the game. For the game Webb would rush for 97 yards and a single touchdown in addition to throwing for 226 yards and a pair of touchdowns.

=== Troy ===
Team	1	2	3	4	Total
UAB	0	0	6	8	14
• Troy	3	7	14	3	27

- Location: Movie Gallery Stadium, Troy, Alabama
- Game start: 2:36 p.m.
- Elapsed time: 3:20
- Game attendance: 21,182
- Game weather: 84 °F (29 °C), Overcast
- Referee: Jeff Roberson
- TV announcers: Sam Smith, Roger Schultz

For the second week in a row, the Blazers would fall, and this time it was by a final score of 14–27 on the road to the Trojans of Troy. For the game, UAB only scored on a pair of Josh Zahn field goals and a single, 17-yard Joe Webb touchdown pass in the fourth.

=== Texas A&M ===
Team	1	2	3	4	Total
UAB	3	3	6	7	19
• Texas A&M	7	21	14	14	56

- Location: Kyle Field, College Station, Texas
- Game start: 6:05 p.m.
- Elapsed time: 3:05
- Game attendance: 74,656
- Game weather: 87 °F (31 °C), Fair
- Referee: C. Castleberry

Traveling to College Station to face the Aggies in the evening, the Blazers would fall by a final score of 56–19. For the game, UAB scored on a pair of Josh Zahn field goals, a 10-yard Joe Webb touchdown run in the third and on a 60-yard David Isabelle run in the fourth.

=== Southern Miss ===
Team	1	2	3	4	Total
Southern Miss	0	10	0	7	17
• UAB	10	0	7	13	30

- Location: Legion Field, Birmingham, Alabama
- Game start: 7:04 p.m.
- Elapsed time: 3:07
- Game attendance: 26,871
- Game weather: 72 °F (22 °C), Clear
- Referee: R.G. Detillier
- TV announcers: Dave Ryan, Akbar Gbaja-Biamila

Following three consecutive losses in addition to coming off a short week, the Blazers would defeat Southern Miss for the first time in school history on a Thursday night by a final score of 30–17. UAB would open the scoring with a 27-yard Josh Zahn field goal and a 31-yard Joe Webb touchdown run in the first, only to have the Golden Eagles score 10 in the second to tie the game at the half. In the third, Webb would hit Anderson for a 21-yard touchdown in the third to take a 17–10 lead into the fourth. Zahn would hit a pair of field goals (51 & 32 yards) and Hiram Atwater would seal the game late following a 40-yard interception return for a touchdown.

== Personnel ==
=== Coaching staff ===
- Neil Callaway – Head Coach
- Kim Helton – Offensive coordinator/tight ends
- Eric Schumann – Defensive coordinator/safeties
- Corey Barlow – Cornerbacks
- Tim Bowens – Receivers
- Lorenzo Costantini – Defensive line
- Steve Davenport – Running backs
- Will Friend – Offensive line
- Tyson Helton – Quarterbacks/recruiting coordinator
- Tyson Summers – Linebackers
- Steve Martin – Strength and Conditioning/Football & Baseball
- Josh Lee – Director of Football Operations

=== Roster ===
2009 UAB Blazers football team roster
Players
Coaches
Offense

Pos.	#	Name	Class
QB	5	Joe Webb	Sr
QB	10	Bryan Ellis	So
OL	71	Matt McCants	So
OL	74	Chris Hubbard	Fr

Defense

Pos.	#	Name	Class
LB	51	Joe Henderson	Sr
DL	87	Bryant Turner	Jr

Special teams

Pos.	#	Name	Class

Head coach

- Neil Callaway

Coordinators/assistant coaches

Legend

- (C) Team captain
- (S) Suspended
- (I) Ineligible
- Injured
- Redshirt

Roster
