= 2010 Liberty Bowl (January) =

2010 Auto Zone Liberty Bowl
- 51st Liberty Bowl
Arkansas Razorbacks	East Carolina Pirates
(7–5)	(9–4)
SEC	C-USA
20	17
Head coach: Bobby Petrino	Head coach: Skip Holtz
	1	2	3	4	OT	Total
Arkansas	0	0	17	0	3	20
East Carolina	0	10	7	0	0	17
- Date: January 2, 2010
- Season: 2009
- Stadium: Liberty Bowl Memorial Stadium
- Location: Memphis, Tennessee
- MVP: Ryan Mallett (QB Arkansas)
- Referee: Tom DeJoseph (ACC)
- Halftime show: Eddie Money
- Attendance: 62,742
- Payout: US$1,700,000

United States TV coverage
- Network: ESPN
- Nielsen ratings: 3.8

The 2010 Liberty Bowl was a college football postseason bowl game played at Liberty Bowl Memorial Stadium in Memphis, Tennessee, on January 2, 2010. The 51st edition of the Liberty Bowl matched the Arkansas Razorbacks of the Southeastern Conference (SEC) against the East Carolina Pirates, the Conference USA Champion. With sponsorship from AutoZone, the game was officially the AutoZone Liberty Bowl. Arkansas won, 20–17, in the first Liberty Bowl to go into overtime.

The game marked Arkansas' fourth appearance in the bowl and first since 1987. East Carolina also made its fourth appearance in the game. The Pirates had played in the 2009 edition, a 25–19 loss to Kentucky. Arkansas entered the game with a 7–5 record. East Carolina entered the game with a 9–4 record. It was the first ever meeting between the two football programs.

== Game summary ==
Alex Tejada kicked a 37-yard field goal in overtime and gave Arkansas a 20–17 win in the Liberty Bowl after East Carolina's Ben Hartman missed two field goal attempts late in regulation and another in the extra session. Arkansas quarterback Ryan Mallett was named most valuable player despite going only 15 of 36 for 202 yards and a touchdown. Dominique Lindsay rushed for 151 yards on 33 carries for East Carolina. His 3-yard touchdown run opened the scoring in the second quarter, ending a 99-yard drive by the Pirates. It was 10–0 at halftime, the first time the Razorbacks had been shut out in the first half since September against Alabama.

The Razorbacks tied it in the third quarter with a defensive touchdown when Tramain Thomas intercepted a pass and ran 37 yards to the end zone. East Carolina took the lead again on Patrick Pinkney's 13-yard touchdown pass to Dwayne Harris with 5:52 left in the third. Arkansas answered 36 seconds later when Mallett threw a 41-yard scoring pass to Jarius Wright to make it 17-all. Pinkney, a sixth-year senior, went 17 of 33 for 209 yards with a touchdown and two interceptions.

East Carolina was physically dominant and Arkansas won despite its inability to convert a single third down. The Arkansas offense was 0–13 on third down conversions (scoring only ten points on offense, in regulation) but was aided by a defensive touchdown after an interception and four missed field goals by ECU (three in regulation, one in the overtime period). This may be the first time a college team has won a game (a bowl game, at least) while failing to convert a single third down attempt.

=== Scoring summary ===
Scoring Play	Score
2nd Quarter
EC — Dominique Lindsay 3-yard rush (Ben Hartman kick), 7:03	EC 7–0
EC — Ben Hartman 34-yard field goal, 0:53	EC 10–0
3rd Quarter
ARK — Alex Tejada 25-yard field goal, 10:41	EC 10–3
ARK — Tramain Thomas 37-yard interception return (Alex Tejada kick), 9:37	TIE 10–10
EC — Dwayne Harris 13-yard catch from Patrick Pinkney (Ben Hartman kick), 5:52	EC 17–10
ARK — Jarius Wright 41-yard catch from Ryan Mallett (Alex Tejada kick), 5:16	TIE 17–17
1st Overtime
ARK - Alex Tejada 37-yard field goal, FINAL	ARK 20–17
