= 2008 UAB Blazers football team =

American college football season

2008 UAB Blazers football
- Conference: Conference USA
- East Division
- Record: 4–8 (3–5 C-USA)
- Head coach: Neil Callaway (2nd season)
- Offensive coordinator: Kim Helton (2nd season)
- Offensive scheme: Pro spread
- Defensive coordinator: Eric Schumann (2nd season)
- Base defense: 4–3
- Home stadium: Legion Field

2008 Conference USA football standings
	Conf.			Overall
Team	W		L	W		L
East Division
East Carolina x$	6	–	2	9	–	5
Memphis	4	–	4	6	–	7
Southern Miss	4	–	4	7	–	6
UAB	3	–	5	4	–	8
UCF	3	–	5	4	–	8
Marshall	3	–	5	4	–	8
West Division
Tulsa xy	7	–	1	11	–	3
Rice x	7	–	1	10	–	3
Houston	6	–	2	8	–	5
UTEP	4	–	4	5	–	7
Tulane	1	–	7	2	–	10
SMU	0	–	8	1	–	11
Championship: East Carolina 27, Tulsa 24
$ – Conference champion; x – Division champion/co-champions; y – Championship game participant; Rankings from AP Poll

The 2008 UAB Blazers football team represented the University of Alabama at Birmingham (UAB) as a member of the East Division in Conference USA (C-USA) during the 2008 NCAA Division I FBS football season. Led by second-year head coach Neil Callaway, the Blazers compiled an overall record of 4–8 with a mark of 3–5 in conference play, placing a three-way tie for fourth at the bottom of the standings in C-USA's East Division. The team played home games at Legion Field in Birmingham, Alabama.

== Schedule ==
Date	Time	Opponent	Site	TV	Result	Attendance
August 30	3:00 p.m.	Tulsa	Legion Field; Birmingham, AL		L 22–45	19,672
September 6	4:00 p.m.	at Florida Atlantic*	Lockhart Stadium; Fort Lauderdale, FL		L 34–49	15,143
September 13	12:30 p.m.	at Tennessee*	Neyland Stadium; Knoxville, TN	Raycom	L 3–35	98,205
September 20	3:00 p.m.	Alabama State*	Legion Field; Birmingham, AL		W 45–10	26,414
September 27	7:00 p.m.	at South Carolina*	Williams–Brice Stadium; Columbia, SC	PPV	L 13–26	78,286
October 2	7:00 p.m.	Memphis	Legion Field; Birmingham, AL	CBSCS	L 30–33	19,901
October 9	7:00 p.m.	at Houston	Robertson Stadium; Houston, TX	CBSCS	L 20–45	18,526
October 18	3:00 p.m.	Marshall^{†}	Legion Field; Birmingham, AL		W 23–21	17,868
November 1	7:00 p.m.	at Southern Miss	M. M. Roberts Stadium; Hattiesburg, MS	CSS	L 14–70	29,281
November 15	2:00 p.m.	at Tulane	Louisiana Superdome; New Orleans, LA		W 41–24	18,614
November 22	6:00 p.m.	East Carolina	Legion Field; Birmingham, AL	CSS	L 13–17	11,453
November 29	1:00 p.m.	at UCF	Bright House Networks Stadium; Orlando, FL		W 15–0	23,644
*Non-conference game; ^{†}Homecoming; All times are in Central time

== Game summaries ==
=== Tulsa ===
	1	2	3	4	Total
Tulsa	7	14	14	10	45
UAB	13	9	0	0	22

The Blazers began their season at home against Golden Hurricane of Tulsa, but after taking a 13–7 lead after the first would fall by a final score of 45–22. UAB would score first on a 32-yard touchdown pass from Joe Webb to Frantell Forrest. Tulsa would respond with a 10-yard David Johnson pass to Jacob Collums, only to have UAB take a 13–7 lead on a 9-yard Jeffery Anderson touchdown reception. Tulsa would respond with a pair of consecutive touchdowns in the second to take a 21–13 lead before Forrest returned a kickoff 90-yards for a touchdown to bring the score to 21–19. A late 32-yard Swayze Waters field goal would give the Blazers a 22–21 halftime lead. However, UAB would not score again for the afternoon and lose by a final score of 45–22.

=== Florida Atlantic ===
	1	2	3	4	Total
UAB	3	14	9	8	34
Florida Atlantic	14	14	7	14	49

The Blazers first road game of the 2008 season took UAB to Ft. Lauderdale, where they would lose too the FAU Owls in a 49–34 shootout. After going down 14–0 on a pair of FAU touchdown passes, UAB would score its first points on a 27-yard Swayze Waters field goal. The Owls would answer with a touchdown run early in the second in taking a 21–3 lead only to see the blazers respond with a pair of Joe Webb touchdown passes, 20-yards to Zach Lankford and 19-yards to Frantell Forrest, in closing the gap to 21–17. However, FAU would score once more before the half in taking a 28–17 halftime lead.

The Blazers would open the third by scoring on a 2-yard Aaron Johns run only to see the Owls once again respond with another touchdown. After a late 43-yard Waters field goal in the third, UAB's final points would come in the fourth on a 10-yard Justin Brooks touchdown run.

=== Tennessee ===
	1	2	3	4	Total
UAB	0	0	3	0	3
Tennessee	14	0	14	7	35

Traveling to Knoxville to face the Volunteers, all the Blazers could manage was a single 47-yard Swayze Waters field goal in the third to avoid the shutout in this 35–3 defeat. For the game, UAB was outgained on offense 275 to 548 total yards.

=== Alabama State ===
	1	2	3	4	Total
Alabama State	7	0	0	3	10
UAB	14	14	14	3	45

The Blazers would amass 486 yards of total offense in winning their first game of the 2008 season with a 44–10 victory over the Hornets of Alabama State. UAB would strike first on a 41-yard Joe Web run with the Hornets responding in kind on a 39-yard Rei Herchenbach touchdown pass to Darius Mathis in tying the game at 7–7 midway through the first quarter. The Blazers would regain the lead late in the first quarter, and never relinquish it again on a 24-yard Webb touchdown pass to Jeffery Anderson. In the second, the Blazers would add another pair of touchdowns on an 11-yard Rashaud Slaughter run and a 36-yard Webb pass to Anderson in taking a 28–7 halftime lead.

UAB would continue to amass points in the third on another pair of touchdowns coming on a 6-yard Slaughter run and 15-yard Justin Brooks run in extending their lead to 42–7 entering the fourth. In the fourth, each team would exchange a pair of field goals in bringing the final score to 45–10. For the game, Joe Webb would rush for 121 yards and a touchdown and pass for 238 yards and a pair of touchdowns.

=== South Carolina ===
	1	2	3	4	Total
UAB	3	3	0	7	13
South Carolina	10	10	3	3	26

Traveling to face their second SEC opponent on the 2008 season, the Blazers were defeated 26–13 by the home Gamecocks in Columbia. After only connecting on a pair of Swayze Waters field goals in the first half, the Blazers lone touchdown came late in the fourth on a 1-yard Joe Webb run.

=== Memphis ===
	1	2	3	4	Total
Memphis	0	20	7	6	33
UAB	10	6	7	7	30

In the annual Battle for the Bones, Memphis defeated UAB 30–33 on a Thursday night in Birmingham. The Blazers would get on the board in the first after Joe Webb connected with Mike Jones for a 16-yard touchdown reception, followed with an 18-yard Swayze Waters field goal to give the Blazers a 10–0 lead entering the second quarter. After Memphis scored early in the second, UAB would respond with a 9-yard Webb run to take a 16–7 lead. However this would be UAB's final lead of the evening as Memphis would score another pair of touchdowns in taking a 20–16 lead at the half. In the second half, Webb would score on runs of 12 and 10-yards in the third and fourth quarters respectively, but were unable to take the lead in falling by a final score of 30–33. For the game, Webb rushed for 93 yards and three touchdowns in addition to passing for 235 yards and another touchdown for the evening.

=== Houston ===
	1	2	3	4	Total
UAB	3	17	0	0	20
Houston	0	3	21	21	45

In the first conference road game of the 2008 season, the Blazers would fall 20–45 at Houston. UAB would dominate the first half in taking a 20–3 lead going into the half. The Blazer would score on a pair of Swayze Waters field goals (50 and 23 yards respectively) and on a 3-yard Joe Webb touchdown run and a 21-yard, Zach Lankford touchdown reception. However, 42 unanswered Cougar points in the second half would provide Houston the 45–20 victory.

=== Marshall ===
	1	2	3	4	Total
Marshall	7	7	0	7	21
UAB	2	15	0	6	23

=== Southern Miss ===
	1	2	3	4	Total
UAB	0	7	7	0	14
Southern Miss	28	21	21	0	70

The Blazers were out-rushed 96 to 463 total yards in this 70–14 blowout loss on the road to the Golden Eagles. After going down 28–0 after the first, UAB would score their first points on a 14-yard Joe Webb touchdown pass to Rashaud Slaughter early in the second. The Blazers only other points would come in the third on a 12-yard Mario Wright touchdown reception. For the game, the Golden Eagles out-gained the Blazers in total offense by a final margin of 610 to 223 yards, with both USM's Tory Harrison and V.J. Floyd each gaining over 100 yards on the ground.

=== Tulane ===
	1	2	3	4	Total
UAB	7	10	14	10	41
Tulane	7	7	7	3	24

Following a bye week, the Blazers would make the trip to the Superdome and emerge with a 41–24 victory over the home Green Wave.

=== East Carolina ===
	1	2	3	4	Total
East Carolina	7	0	3	7	17
UAB	7	0	3	3	13

This 17–13 Pirates victory marked the first all-time win for East Carolina in Legion Field against the Blazers.

=== UCF ===
	1	2	3	4	Total
UAB	3	6	3	3	15
UCF	0	0	0	0	0

== Personnel ==
=== Coaching staff ===
- Neil Callaway – head coach
- Kim Helton – Offensive coordinator/tight ends
- Eric Schumann – Defensive coordinator/safeties
- Corey Barlow – Cornerbacks
- Tim Bowens – Receivers
- Lorenzo Costantini – Defensive line
- Steve Davenport – Running backs
- Will Friend – Offensive line
- Tyson Helton – Quarterbacks/recruiting coordinator
- Tyson Summers – Linebackers
- Steve martin – Strength and Conditioning/Football & Baseball
- Ervin lewis – Director of Football Operations

=== Roster ===
2008 UAB Blazers roster
UAB Official Athletic Site: 2008 Roster
Quarterbacks: 5 Joe Webb – Junior; 10 Bryan Ellis – (redshirt) Freshman; 12 Cameron Cowart – Senior; 14 Rodney Bivens Jr. – Senior; 17 David Isabelle – Freshman; Running backs: 2 Jae Fitzgerald – (redshirt) Freshman; 20 Jimmie Blair – (redshirt) Freshman; 28 Aaron Johns – Senior; 30 Justin Brooks – Sophomore; 38 Dexter Barnett – Sophomore; 40 Jim Mitchell – Junior; 44 Caleb Dyck – Sophomore; Wide receivers: 1 Rashaud Slaughter – Junior; 7 Frantrell Forrest – Sophomore; 11 Mario Wright – Sophomore; 15 Sylvester Mencer – Senior; 22 Mike Jones – Sophomore; 24 Cameron Thompson – Sophomore; 36 Paul Schoolar – Junior; 80 Mark Ferrell – Junior; 82 Justin Johnson – Sophomore; 83 Brandon Heath – Senior; 85 Rodell Carter – Sophomore; 89 Darryl Harris – Junior	Tight ends: 81 Joseph Waller – Sophomore; 84 Zach Lankford – Junior; 86 Jeffery Anderson – Sophomore; Offensive line: 53 Jake Seitz – Junior; 55 Terence Edge – Sophomore; 59 Sean Dailey – (redshirt) Freshman; 63 Willie Thompson – Junior; 64 Greg Calhoun – (redshirt) Freshman; 68 Adam Hollifield – Sophomore; 71 Matt McCants – Sophomore; 72 Logan Creel – Sophomore; 73 Caleb Thomas – (redshirt) Freshman; 75 Daniel Seahorn – Junior; 77 Jared Koechner – Junior; Defensive line: 50 David Decordova – Junior; 76 Todd Howanitz – Junior; 87 Bryant Turner – Sophomore; 90 Joe Happe – Junior; 91 Tim Davis – Sophomore; 92 Anthony Barnes – Junior; 93 Nick Davison – Freshman; 95 Richard Carter – Senior; 96 Elliott Henigan – Freshman; 97 D.J. Reese – Sophomore; 98 Adam Arthur – (redshirt) Freshman	Linebackers: 13 Keon Harris – Sophomore; 33 Mike Tashman – Sophomore; 35 Lamanski Ware – Freshman; 38 Garrett Armstrong – Freshman; 44 Kyle Roget – Junior; 45 B.J. Steed – Junior; 46 Terry Thomas – Senior; 48 Drew Luker – Freshman; 49 Brad Dukes – Junior; 51 Joe Henderson – Senior; 57 Jarrell Watters – Freshman; 58 Katrell Watters – Freshman; Defensive backs: 3 Andre Hicks – Freshman; 4 Brandon Carlisle – Junior; 8 Marquis Coleman – (redshirt) Freshman; 17 Jeff Witt – Sophomore; 18 Will Dunbar – Senior; 19 Ugonna Amarikwa – (redshirt) Freshman; 21 Kevin Sanders – Senior; 23 Antoine Powers – Senior; 25 Brock Ferguson – Sophomore; 26 Justin Smartt – Junior; 27 Michael McRae – Sophomore; 29 Terrell Springs – Freshman; 31 Chase Daniel – Freshman; 36 Daniel Clements – Freshman; 42 Ferson Stafford – (redshirt) Freshman; 43 Matt Taylor – Senior	Punters: 94 Swayze Waters – Senior; Kickers: 24 Trey Ragland – Freshman; 94 Swayze Waters – Senior; Long snappers: 60 Nick Haddad – Senior; 62 Jeff Hamby – Senior

=== Recruiting ===
In Callaway's second recruiting class, UAB signed 25 recruits.

College recruiting
Name	Hometown	School	Height	Weight	40^{‡}	Commit date
Chris Assily; SAF	Honolulu, HI	Costa Mesa (CA) Orange Coast CC	6 ft 2 in (1.88 m)	215 lb (98 kg)	N/A	
Chris Assily; SAF	Recruit ratings: Rivals:					
Anthony Barnes; DE	Hazlehurst, MS	Copiah-Lincoln (MS) CC	6 ft 3 in (1.91 m)	255 lb (116 kg)	N/A	
Anthony Barnes; DE	Recruit ratings: Rivals:					
Josh Brinson; WR	Homestead, FL	South Dade Senior HS	6 ft 1 in (1.85 m)	165 lb (75 kg)	N/A	Feb 6, 2008
Josh Brinson; WR	Recruit ratings: Scout: Rivals:					
Rodell Carter; WR	Mount Pleasant, SC	Georgia Military College	6 ft 4 in (1.93 m)	220 lb (100 kg)	4.48	Feb 6, 2008
Rodell Carter; WR	Recruit ratings: Scout: Rivals:					
Chase Daniel; SAF	Birmingham, AL	Hoover HS	6 ft 3 in (1.91 m)	190 lb (86 kg)	4.52	Feb 6, 2008
Chase Daniel; SAF	Recruit ratings: Scout: Rivals:					
Nick Davidson; DT	Calhoun, GA	Calhoun HS	6 ft 0 in (1.83 m)	275 lb (125 kg)	N/A	Feb 6, 2008
Nick Davidson; DT	Recruit ratings: Scout: Rivals:					
David Decordova; DT	Manhattan Beach, CA	El Camino College	6 ft 2 in (1.88 m)	280 lb (130 kg)	5.10	Dec 16, 2007
David Decordova; DT	Recruit ratings: Scout: Rivals:					
Mark Ferrell; WR	South Boston, VA	Mississippi Delta JC	6 ft 2 in (1.88 m)	220 lb (100 kg)	N/A	Dec 17, 2007
Mark Ferrell; WR	Recruit ratings: Scout: Rivals:					
Tyler Fowler; OL	Carnesville, GA	Franklin County HS	6 ft 6 in (1.98 m)	290 lb (130 kg)	N/A	Feb 6, 2008
Tyler Fowler; OL	Recruit ratings: Scout: Rivals:					
Elliott Henigan; DL	Atlanta, GA	The Lovett School	6 ft 4 in (1.93 m)	240 lb (110 kg)	N/A	Feb 6, 2008
Elliott Henigan; DL	Recruit ratings: Scout: Rivals:					
Andre Hicks; DB	Atlanta, GA	The Lovett School	5 ft 9 in (1.75 m)	165 lb (75 kg)	N/A	Aug 9, 2007
Andre Hicks; DB	Recruit ratings: Scout: Rivals:					
David Isabelle; QB	Huntsville, AL	Johnson HS	6 ft 3 in (1.91 m)	185 lb (84 kg)	N/A	Jan 25, 2008
David Isabelle; QB	Recruit ratings: Scout: Rivals:					
Aaron Johns; RB	Thomasville, AL	Copiah-Lincoln (MS) CC	5 ft 10 in (1.78 m)	190 lb (86 kg)	4.5	Jan 17, 2008
Aaron Johns; RB	Recruit ratings: Scout: Rivals:					
Jared Koechner; OL	Louisburg, KS	Fort Scott JC	6 ft 5 in (1.96 m)	285 lb (129 kg)	N/A	Feb 6, 2008
Jared Koechner; OL	Recruit ratings: Scout: Rivals:					
Drew Luker; LB	Sweet Water, AL	Sweet Water HS	6 ft 3 in (1.91 m)	180 lb (82 kg)	N/A	Jan 22, 2008
Drew Luker; LB	Recruit ratings: Scout: Rivals:					
Patrick Reynolds; DB	Dothan, AL	Northview HS	5 ft 9 in (1.75 m)	175 lb (79 kg)	N/A	Feb 6, 2008
Patrick Reynolds; DB	Recruit ratings: Scout: Rivals:					
Kyle Roget; LB	Arlington, TX	Tyler JC	6 ft 1 in (1.85 m)	235 lb (107 kg)	N/A	Dec 2, 2007
Kyle Roget; LB	Recruit ratings: Scout: Rivals:					
Ryan Roget; OL	Arlington, TX	Tyler JC	6 ft 3 in (1.91 m)	285 lb (129 kg)	N/A	Dec 2, 2007
Ryan Roget; OL	Recruit ratings: Scout: Rivals:					
Dominique Roulach; LB	Alexandria, VA	Coffeyville, Kan. CC	6 ft 1 in (1.85 m)	240 lb (110 kg)	N/A	Feb 6, 2008
Dominique Roulach; LB	Recruit ratings: Scout: Rivals:					
Daniel Seahorn; OL	Houston, TX	Tyler JC	6 ft 2 in (1.88 m)	300 lb (140 kg)	N/A	Dec 2, 2007
Daniel Seahorn; OL	Recruit ratings: Scout: Rivals:					
Terrell Springs; DB	Chester, SC	Chester HS	5 ft 9 in (1.75 m)	175 lb (79 kg)	4.52	Jul 20, 2007
Terrell Springs; DB	Recruit ratings: Scout: Rivals:					
Lamanski Ware; LB	Lanett, AL	Lanett HS	6 ft 2 in (1.88 m)	205 lb (93 kg)	4.45	Jan 23, 2008
Lamanski Ware; LB	Recruit ratings: Scout: Rivals:					
Jarrell Watters; LB	Thomasville, AL	Thomasville HS	6 ft 0 in (1.83 m)	225 lb (102 kg)	4.6	Sep 28, 2008
Jarrell Watters; LB	Recruit ratings: Scout: Rivals:					
Kattrell Watters; LB	Thomasville, AL	Thomasville HS	6 ft 0 in (1.83 m)	235 lb (107 kg)	4.7	Sep 28, 2008
Kattrell Watters; LB	Recruit ratings: Scout: Rivals:					
Daniel White; LB	Apopka, FL	Apopka HS	6 ft 2 in (1.88 m)	220 lb (100 kg)	4.6	Jan 21, 2008
Daniel White; LB	Recruit ratings: Scout: Rivals:					
Overall recruit ranking: Scout: 105 Rivals: 105
‡ Refers to 40-yard dash; Note: In many cases, Scout, Rivals, 247Sports, On3, and ESPN may conflict in their listings of height, weight and 40 time.; In these cases, the average was taken. ESPN grades are on a 100-point scale.; Sources: "2008 Team Ranking". Rivals.com.

== Statistics ==
=== Team ===
Statistics	UAB	Opponents
Scoring	273	375
Points per game	22.8	31.2
First downs	222	240
Rushing	101	95
Passing	104	125
Penalties	17	20
Total offensive yards	4,394	5,159
Rushing	2,027	2,004
Passing	2,367	3,155
Fumbles–Lost	17–9	15–8
Penalties–Yards	83–783	61–567
Average per game	65.2	47.2

Statistics	UAB	Opponents
Punts–Yards	59–2,555	42–1,799
Average per punt	43.3	42.8
Average ToP/game	31:16	28:44
3rd down conversions	64/165	68/151
3rd down percentage	39	45
4th down conversions	5/11	6/15
4th down percentage	45	40
Touchdowns scored	31	49
Field goals–Att	19–24	11–18
PAT–Att	24–27	48–48
Attendance	190,616	563,398
Average	19,062	40,243

==== Scores by quarter ====
	1	2	3	4	Total
UAB	65	101	60	47	273
Opponents	101	96	97	81	375

=== Offense ===
==== Rushing ====
Name	GP	Att	Yds	Avg	Long	TD	Avg/G
Joe Webb	12	198	1,021	5.2	41	11	85.1
Rashaud Slaughter	12	113	514	4.5	38	4	42.8
Justin Brooks	11	53	218	4.1	19	3	19.8
Aaron Johns	8	23	115	5.0	37	1	14.4
Jim Mitchell	12	19	78	4.1	14	0	6.5
Frantrell Forrest	10	8	43	5.4	12	0	4.3
Rodney Bivens	4	6	20	3.3	17	0	5.0
Caleb Dyck	12	4	14	3.5	9	0	1.2
Terence Edge	12	0	12	0	0	0	1.0
Mark Ferrell	12	2	11	5.5	11	0	0.9
Justin Johnson	11	2	4	2.0	7	0	0.4
Darryl Harris	12	1	−4	−4.0	0	0	−0.3
Swayze Waters	12	2	−12	−6.0	7	0	−1.0
Total	12	435	2,027	4.7	41	19	168.9
Opponents	12	420	2,004	4.8	78	25	167.0

==== Passing ====
Name	GP	Effic	Cmp-Att	Pct	Yds	TD	Int	Lng	Avg/G
Joe Webb	12	115.53	208–353	58.9	2,367	10	16	43	197.2
Rodney Bivens	4	0	0–0	0	0	0	0	0	0
Total	12	115.53	208–353	58.9	2,367	10	16	43	197.2
Opponents	12	147.67	226–360	62.8	3,155	22	16	73	262.9

==== Receiving ====
Name	GP	No.	Yards	Avg	TD	Long	Avg/G
Frantrell Forrest	10	44	536	12.8	2	38	53.6
Rashaud Slaughter	12	29	176	6.1	1	21	14.7
Jeffery Anderson	12	23	368	16.0	3	43	30.7
Mario Wright	12	20	243	12.1	1	38	20.2
Rodell Carter	12	16	206	12.9	0	38	17.2
Zach Lankford	12	16	190	11.9	2	33	15.8
Mark Ferrell	12	13	177	13.6	0	35	14.8
Mike Jones	12	11	109	9.9	1	28	9.1
Justin Brooks	11	11	101	9.2	0	23	9.2
Darryl Harris	12	9	136	15.1	0	28	11.3
Jim Mitchell	12	8	38	4.8	0	11	3.2
Justin Johnson	11	7	82	11.7	0	43	7.5
Aaron Johns	8	3	5	1.7	0	9	0.6
Total	12	208	2,367	11.4	10	43	197.2
Opponents	12	226	3,155	14.0	22	73	262.9

=== Defense ===
Name	GP	Tackles				Sacks	Pass defense				Fumbles		Blkd	Safety
Name	GP	Solo	Ast	Total	Loss–Yds	No.–Yds	Int–Yds	BU	PD	Qbh	Rcv–Yds	FF	Kick	Safety
Joe Henderson	12	55	32	87	12.5–29	1.5–6		1		1				
Will Dunbar	11	33	35	68	2.5–12	1.0–6	2–34	5		1				
Matt Taylor	12	29	18	47	1.5–5		1–36	3			1–0			
Keon Harris	11	22	25	47	3.0–4					1	1–0	1		
Chase Daniel	12	34	13	47	3.5–18	1.0–12	2–28	5		1				
Brandon Carlisle	10	35	11	46	2.0–5		2–16	3				1		
Kevin Sanders	12	23	15	38			7–55	3						
Terrel Springs	10	20	12	32			0–18	4						
D.J. Reese	12	17	14	31	2.5–18						1–0	1		
Anthony Barnes	12	20	7	27	6.5–23	1.0–10		2		2				1
Elliott Henigan	10	14	12	26	0.5–2	0.5–2		1						
Drew Luker	12	9	15	24	1.5–5									
Lamanski Ware	11	14	9	23	1.0–1		1–27	1						
Richard Carter	12	13	8	21	2.0–8	0.5–0					1–0			
Bryant Turner	12	15	5	20	7.0–31	4.0–25				1		2		
Nick Davison	12	7	10	17	3.5–23	2.0–18		1			1–0			
Joe Happe	12	11	4	15	4.0–17	1.0–9						1		
Katrell Watters	5	7	8	15	0.5–1	0.5–1								
B.J. Steed	10	8	7	15				1						
Marquis Coleman	12	9	5	14			1–0	1						
Tony Leggett	5	6	8	14	2.0–4									
Andre Hicks	8	10	2	12	1.0–13	1.0–13		1						
Antoine Powers	12	7	4	11										
Tim Davis	9	7	2	9	1.0–3									
Justin Smartt	11	7	2	9										
Terry Thomas	7	6	3	9	2.0–3									
Ugonna Amarikwa	12	4	4	8							3–12			
Swayze Waters	12	6	2	8										
Jarrell Watters	3	7	1	8	1.0–1			1						
Jim Mitchell	12	3	2	5										
David Decordova	3	3	1	4						1				
Caleb Dyck	12	3	1	4										
Michael McRae	9	2	2	4										
Zach Lankford	12	1	2	3										
Daniel Clements	10	2	1	3										
Mario Wright	12	2		2										
Jeffery Anderson	12	2		2										
Brock Ferguson	5	2		2	1.0–14	1.0–14								
Frantrell Forrest	10	2		2										
Ada Hollifield	8		1	1										
Greg Bulls	11		1	1										
Rashaud Slaughter	12		1	1										
Brandon Heath	11	1		1										
Adam Arthur	6	1		1										
Jeff Hamby	11		1	1										
Mark Ferrell	12	1		1										
Total	12	480	306	786	62–240	15–116	16–214	33		9	8–12	6	0	1
Opponents	12	482	368	850	58–282	23–172	16–154	47		14	9–62	10	2	0

=== Special teams ===
==== Kicking ====
Name	PATs			Field Goals			
Name	Made	Att	%	Made	Att	Long	%
Swayze Waters	24	27	88.9	19	24	50	79.2
Total	24	27	88.9	19	24	50	79.2

==== Punting ====
Name	No.	Yds	Avg	Long	TB	FC	In20
Swayze Waters	55	2,396	43.6	67	6	12	13
Joe Webb	2	89	44.5	52	1	0	0
Trey Ragland	1	48	48.0	48	0	0	1
Total	58	2,533	43.7	67	7	12	14

== Media ==
All games were broadcast live on the UAB-ISP Sports radio network. The flagship was WWMM 100.5 FM in Birmingham, and this marked the first season for it serving as the flagship. The games were called by David Crane (play-by-play) and Jake Arians (color commentary), with Pat Green and Dan Burks as field reporters. Other UAB radio programming was carried on WJOX 94.5 FM. The team did not have a local TV contract, but their games appeared nationally on cable television five times—one on Raycom Sports, two on CSS, and two on CBS College Sports (formerly CSTV).
