= 2008 Tulane Green Wave football team =

American college football season

2008 Tulane Green Wave football
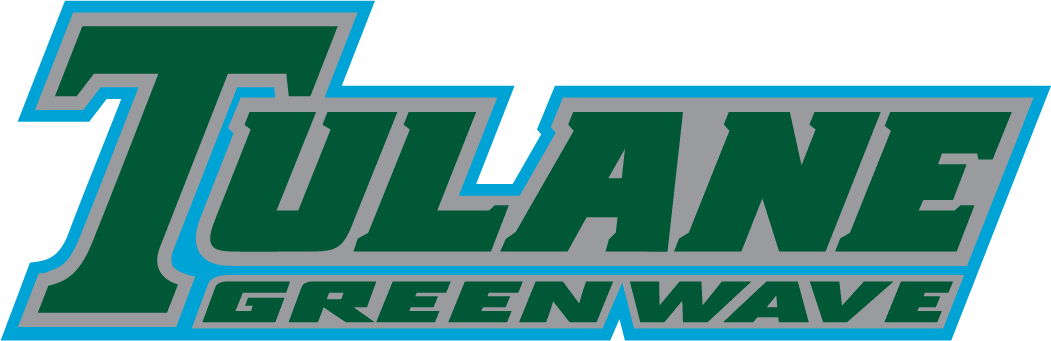
- Conference: Conference USA
- West
- Record: 2–10 (1–7 C–USA)
- Head coach: Bob Toledo (2nd season)
- Offensive coordinator: Dan Dodd (2nd season)
- Offensive scheme: West Coast
- Defensive coordinator: O’Neil Gilbert (1st season)
- Base defense: 4–3
- Home stadium: Superdome; Tad Gormley Stadium

2008 Conference USA football standings
	Conf.			Overall
Team	W		L	W		L
East Division
East Carolina x$	6	–	2	9	–	5
Memphis	4	–	4	6	–	7
Southern Miss	4	–	4	7	–	6
UAB	3	–	5	4	–	8
UCF	3	–	5	4	–	8
Marshall	3	–	5	4	–	8
West Division
Tulsa xy	7	–	1	11	–	3
Rice x	7	–	1	10	–	3
Houston	6	–	2	8	–	5
UTEP	4	–	4	5	–	7
Tulane	1	–	7	2	–	10
SMU	0	–	8	1	–	11
Championship: East Carolina 27, Tulsa 24
$ – Conference champion; x – Division champion/co-champions; y – Championship game participant; Rankings from AP Poll

The 2008 Tulane Green Wave football team represented Tulane University during the 2008 NCAA Division I FBS football season. Tulane competed as a member of the Conference USA.

The team was led by second-year head coach Bob Toledo. Tulane finished the season with a 2–10 record. Despite this, sports columnist King Kaufman declared the Green Wave the national champions. In a Salon article, meant more to point out the flaws in the Bowl Championship Series (BCS) than make a real argument in Tulane's favor, he wrote:

"Tulane beat Louisiana-Monroe, who beat Troy, who beat Middle Tennessee, who beat Maryland, who beat Wake Forest, who beat Mississippi ... [who beat BCS champions] Florida ... [and] also beat Texas Tech, who beat Texas, who beat [BCS runners-up] Oklahoma."

== Schedule ==
Date	Time	Opponent	Site	TV	Result	Attendance
September 6	6:00 pm	at No. 13 Alabama*	Bryant–Denny Stadium; Tuscaloosa, AL	ESPN360	L 6–20	92,138
September 13	2:00 pm	No. 14 East Carolina	Superdome; New Orleans, LA	WITN	L 24–28	27,189
September 20	2:00 pm	Louisiana–Monroe*	Superdome; New Orleans, LA	CST	W 24–10	23,419
September 25	7:00 pm	SMU	Superdome; New Orleans, LA	CBSCS	W 34–27	25,643
October 4	2:00 pm	Army*^{†}	Tad Gormley Stadium; New Orleans, LA	CST	L 13–44	23,794
October 11	8:05 pm	at UTEP	Sun Bowl; El Paso, TX		L 21–24	33,121
October 25	2:00 pm	Rice	Superdome; New Orleans, LA		L 17–42	17,841
November 1	7:00 pm	at No. 15 LSU*	Tiger Stadium; Baton Rouge, LA (Battle for the Rag)	GamePlan	L 10–35	92,136
November 8	7:00 pm	at Houston	Robertson Stadium; Houston, TX	CBSCS	L 14–42	23,522
November 15	2:00 pm	UAB	Superdome; New Orleans, LA		L 24–41	18,614
November 22	2:00 pm	at Tulsa	Chapman Stadium; Tulsa, OK		L 7–56	20,391
November 29	1:00 pm	at Memphis	Liberty Bowl; Memphis, TN		L 6–45	15,012
*Non-conference game; ^{†}Homecoming; Rankings from AP Poll released prior to the game; All times are in Eastern time
