= Aldrick Robinson =

American football player (born 1988)

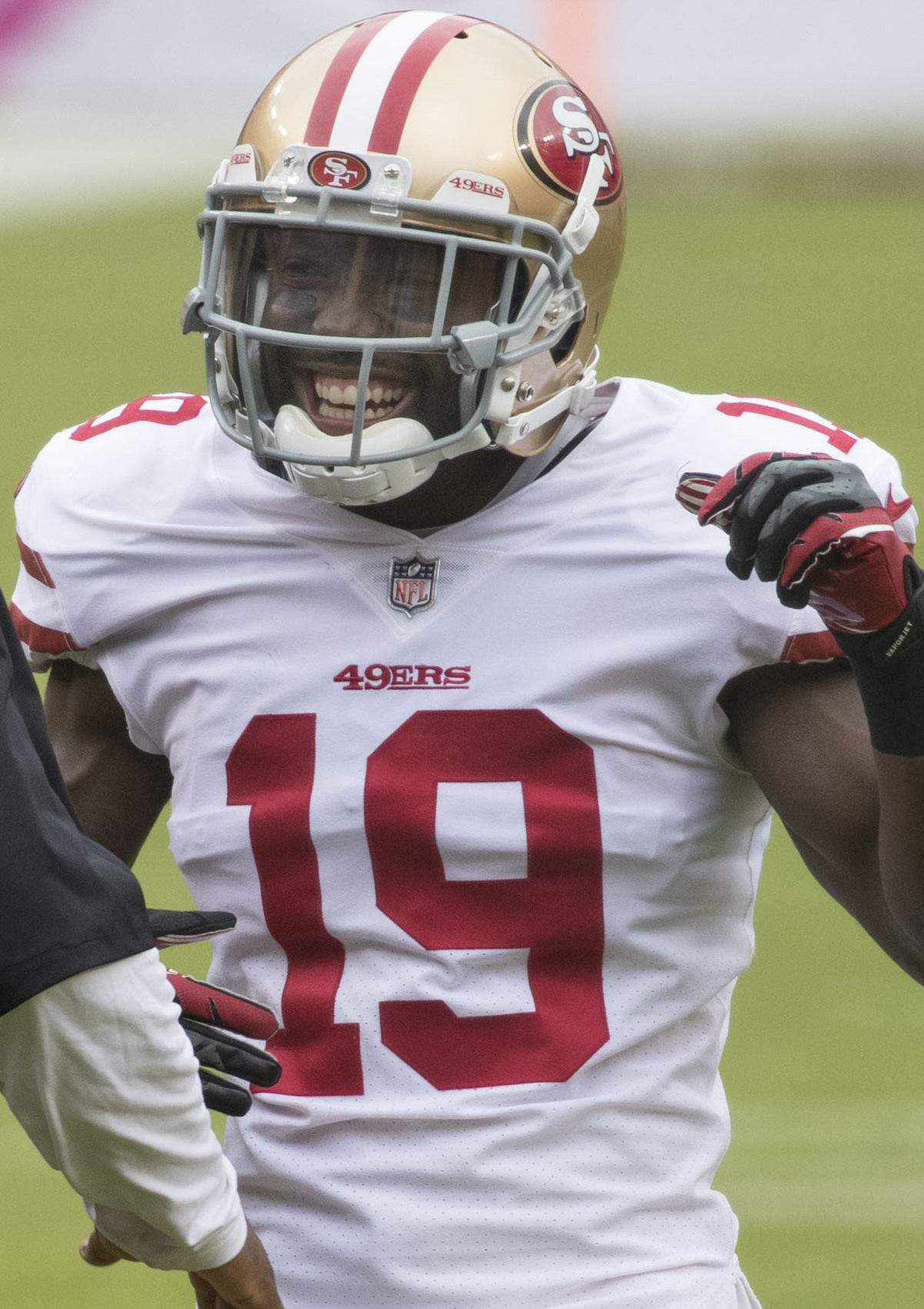
- Robinson with the San Francisco 49ers in 2017

No. 11, 15, 19, 17
- Position: Wide receiver

Personal information
- Born: September 24, 1988 (age 38); Dallas, Texas, U.S.
- Listed height: 5 ft 10 in (1.78 m)
- Listed weight: 187 lb (85 kg)

Career information
- High school: Waxahachie (Waxahachie, Texas)
- College: SMU (2007–2010)
- NFL draft: 2011: 6th round, 178th overall pick

Career history

Playing
- Washington Redskins (2011–2014); Baltimore Ravens (2014–2015)*; Atlanta Falcons (2016); San Francisco 49ers (2017); Minnesota Vikings (2018); Carolina Panthers (2019)*
- * Offseason or practice squad member only

Coaching
- Miami Dolphins (2022) Offensive assistant

Awards and highlights
- First-team All-C-USA (2010)

Career NFL statistics
- Receptions: 86
- Receiving yards: 1,422
- Receiving touchdowns: 14
- Stats at Pro Football Reference

Aldrick Robinson (born September 24, 1988) is an American former professional football player who was a wide receiver for eight seasons in the National Football League (NFL). He played college football for the SMU Mustangs and was selected in the sixth round of the 2011 NFL draft by the Washington Redskins. He also played for the Baltimore Ravens, Atlanta Falcons, San Francisco 49ers, Minnesota Vikings, and Carolina Panthers.

== Early life ==
Robinson attended Waxahachie High School in Waxahachie, Texas, where he played football for the Indians. As a junior, he recorded 21 receptions for 651 yards and eight touchdowns. As a senior, he recorded 29 receptions for 647 yards and eight touchdowns and over 1,500 all-purpose yards. He was also named the team's most valuable player, a PrepStar all-region and a two-time all-district player. He was ranked 96th on The Dallas Morning News Area Top 100 list and named a Dave Campbell's Texas Football Player to Watch.

Robinson was ranked a two-star prospect by Rivals.com. Robinson received a scholarship offer from Kansas, but turned it down in order to attend SMU.

== College career ==
As a true freshman in 2007, Robinson saw action in nine games and recorded ten receptions for 166 yards.

In 2008, Robinson started in ten games and recorded 59 receptions for 1,047 yards and 11 touchdowns. He tied the SMU single-season touchdown record and became the third Mustang to compile a 1,000-yard season. His 210 yards against UCF was the all-time second-highest for a game at SMU and caught the school's second-longest touchdown reception at 94 yards. Robinson was named an honorable mention All-Conference USA player and to the Pegasus News All-DFW College Football Team.

In the 2009 season, Robinson recorded 47 receptions for 800 yards and five touchdowns. In the 2010 season, he had 65 receptions for 1,301 receiving yards and 14 receiving touchdowns.

SMU head coach June Jones called him the fastest player he has coached and projected him as a first-day NFL draft selection.

Robinson also competed in prep track and field. He finished second in the 200-meter dash at the University Interscholastic League (UIL) 4A State Championship with a time of 21.48 seconds, and placed 6th in the 100-meter dash at the Texas Relays with a time of 10.61 seconds.

=== College statistics ===
Year	Team	GP	Receiving			
Year	Team	GP	Rec	Yds	Avg	TD
2007	SMU	9	10	166	16.6	0
2008	SMU	10	59	1,047	17.7	11
2009	SMU	13	47	800	17.0	5
2010	SMU	14	65	1,301	20.0	14
Career		46	181	3,314	18.3	30

== Professional career ==
Pre-draft measurables
Height	Weight	Arm length	Hand span	Wingspan	40-yard dash	10-yard split	20-yard split	20-yard shuttle	Three-cone drill	Vertical jump	Broad jump	Bench press
5 ft 9 5/8 in (1.77 m)	184 lb (83 kg)	29 1/2 in (0.75 m)	8 3/4 in (0.22 m)	5 ft 11 in (1.80 m)	4.48 s	1.58 s	2.60 s	4.09 s	6.65 s	40.0 in (1.02 m)	10 ft 6 in (3.20 m)	17 reps
All values from NFL Combine

=== Washington Redskins ===
==== 2011 season ====
Robinson was selected by the Washington Redskins in the sixth round of the 2011 NFL draft with the 178th overall pick. On September 3, he was waived, but placed on the practice squad on September 6. Robinson was activated to the active roster on December 27, filling the spot left open after Ryan Torain was waived.

==== 2012 season ====
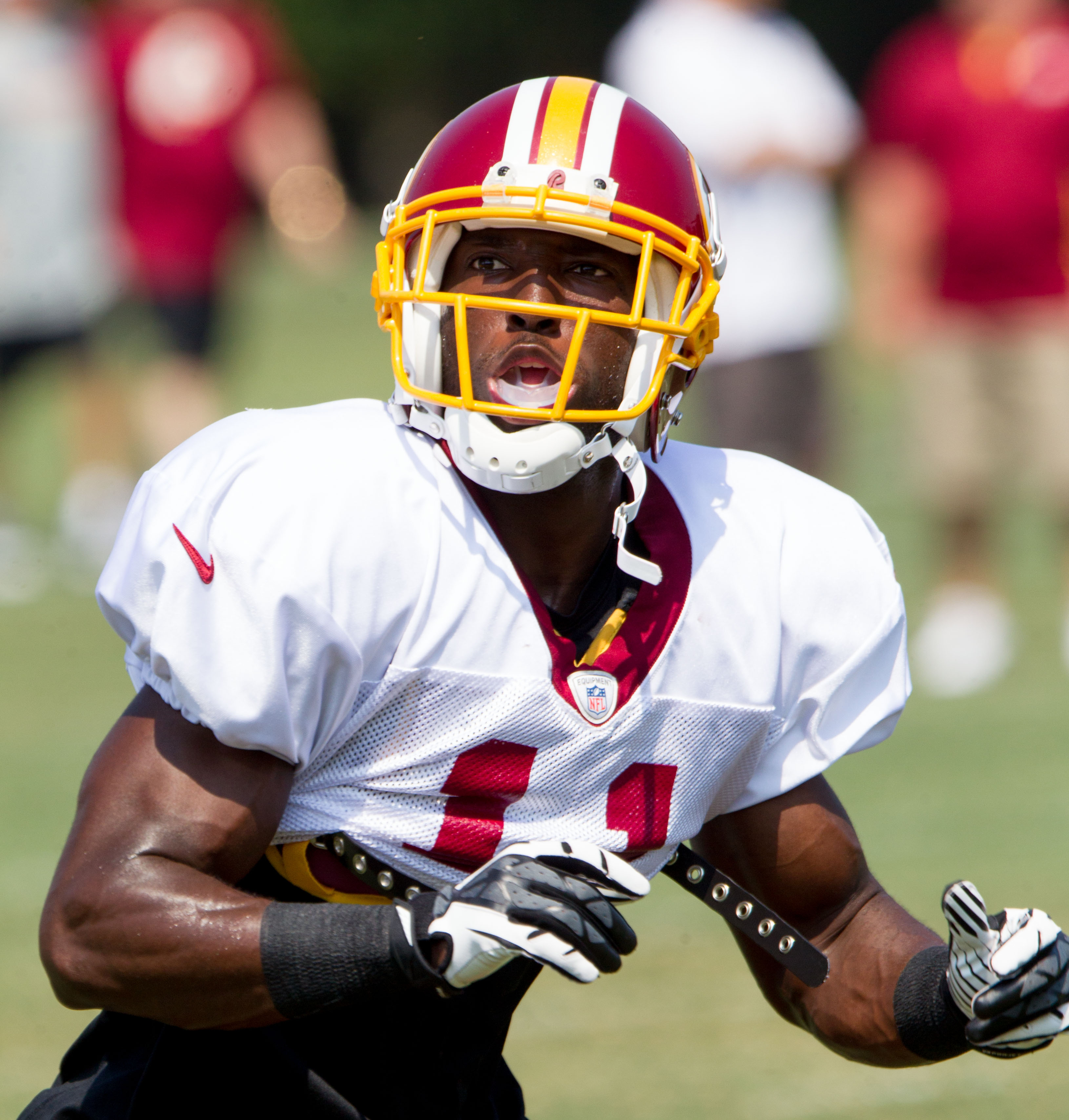
Aldrick Robinson in 2012 training camp

At the start of 2012 training camp, it was announced that Robinson was taking reps as a punt returner, providing competition for Brandon Banks. After having an impressive performance in the preseason, he made the final 53-man roster at the start of the 2012 season. Robinson made his NFL debut in the 2012 season opener win against the New Orleans Saints, subbing in for Pierre Garçon, who missed the entire second half of the game after suffering a foot injury. In the game, he recorded 52 yards on four receptions and scored his first career touchdown. In Week 2 against the St. Louis Rams, Robinson had his first career start in place of an injured Garçon. Though he recorded 40 yards on two receptions, he dropped a crucial 57-yard pass that hit him in the chest in the fourth quarter in their 31–28 loss to the Rams. During pre-game warm-ups for the Week 4 game against the Tampa Bay Buccaneers, Brandon Meriweather collided with him and both were inactive for the game, due to Meriweather re-injuring his knee and Robinson out with a concussion. In the Week 11 win against the Philadelphia Eagles, Robinson scored his second career touchdown after catching a 49-yard touchdown pass from Robert Griffin III. The following week, he caught a 68-yard touchdown pass in the Redskins' victory over the Dallas Cowboys on Thanksgiving. He finished the 2012 season with 11 receptions for 237 receiving yards and three receiving touchdowns.

==== 2013 season ====
After having a quiet start to the 2013 season, Robinson caught two passes for 75 yards, which included a 45-yard touchdown reception from Robert Griffin III in the 45–41 Week 7 win against the Chicago Bears. In Week 11, he scored a 41-yard touchdown pass against the Philadelphia Eagles. He finished the 2013 season with 18 receptions for 365 receiving yards and two receiving touchdowns in 16 games and one start.

==== 2014 season ====
On February 6, 2014, Robinson re-signed with the Redskins on a one-year deal. On April 2, 2014, Robinson announced that he would be switching over to #15, allowing new teammate DeSean Jackson to wear number 11. He was waived by the team on December 6.

=== Baltimore Ravens ===
Robinson signed with the Baltimore Ravens' practice squad on December 9, 2014.

On January 23, 2015, Robinson signed a futures contract with the Ravens. He was released by the Ravens on August 29.

=== Atlanta Falcons ===
Robinson signed with the Atlanta Falcons on March 15, 2016. In Week 4 against the Panthers, Robinson recorded two catches for 48 yards and his first touchdown since the 2013 season. Robinson and the Falcons reached Super Bowl LI, where they faced the New England Patriots. In the Super Bowl, the Falcons fell 34–28 in overtime. Robinson finished the 2016 season with 20 receptions for 323 yards and two touchdowns on 32 targets.

=== San Francisco 49ers ===
On March 10, 2017, Robinson signed a two-year contract with the San Francisco 49ers.

In the 2017 season, Robinson recorded 19 receptions for 260 receiving yards and two receiving touchdowns in 16 games and one start.

On August 31, 2018, Robinson was released by the 49ers.

=== Minnesota Vikings ===
On September 17, 2018, Robinson signed with the Minnesota Vikings. In Week 4 against the Los Angeles Rams, he recorded two receiving touchdowns from Kirk Cousins in the 38–31 loss. Robinson finished the season with 17 receptions for 231 yards and five touchdowns.

=== Carolina Panthers ===
On May 17, 2019, Robinson signed with the Carolina Panthers. He was released by Carolina during final roster cuts on August 30.

== Coaching career ==
In February 2022, Robinson became an offensive assistant on head coach Mike McDaniel’s inaugural staff with the Miami Dolphins.
