= 2008 SMU Mustangs football team =

American college football season

2008 SMU Mustangs football
- Conference: Conference USA
- West Division
- Record: 1–11 (0–8 C-USA)
- Head coach: June Jones (1st season)
- Offensive coordinator: Dan Morrison (1st season)
- Offensive scheme: Run and shoot
- Defensive coordinator: Tom Mason (1st season)
- Base defense: 3–4
- Home stadium: Gerald J. Ford Stadium

Uniform

2008 Conference USA football standings
| | Conf. | | | Overall |
| Team | W | | L | W | | L |
|---|---|---|---|---|---|---|
East Division
| East Carolina x$ | 6 | – | 2 | 9 | – | 5 |
| Memphis | 4 | – | 4 | 6 | – | 7 |
| Southern Miss | 4 | – | 4 | 7 | – | 6 |
| UAB | 3 | – | 5 | 4 | – | 8 |
| UCF | 3 | – | 5 | 4 | – | 8 |
| Marshall | 3 | – | 5 | 4 | – | 8 |
West Division
| Tulsa xy | 7 | – | 1 | 11 | – | 3 |
| Rice x | 7 | – | 1 | 10 | – | 3 |
| Houston | 6 | – | 2 | 8 | – | 5 |
| UTEP | 4 | – | 4 | 5 | – | 7 |
| Tulane | 1 | – | 7 | 2 | – | 10 |
| SMU | 0 | – | 8 | 1 | – | 11 |
Championship: East Carolina 27, Tulsa 24
$ – Conference champion; x – Division champion/co-champions; y – Championship game participant; Rankings from AP Poll

The 2008 SMU Mustangs football team represented Southern Methodist University (SMU) as a member the West Division of Conference USA (C-USA) during the 2008 NCAA Division I FBS football season. Led by first-year head coach June Jones, the Mustangs compiled an overall record of 1–11 with a mark of 0–8 in conference play, placing last of out of six teams in C-USA's West Division. SMU played their home games at Gerald J. Ford Stadium in University Park, Texas.

== Previous season ==
The 2007 team finished with an overall record of 1–11; the team's only win was against North Texas. The Mustangs went 0–8 in conference play, finishing in last place in the Conference USA's West Division. Sixth year head coach Phil Bennett was fired following the team's last game of the season. Bennett finished his tenure at SMU with a record of 18–52 and never had a winning season.

== Offseason ==
=== Coaching changes ===
SMU hired June Jones as the program's 17th head coach on January 7, 2008. Jones's contract was worth $2 million, making him the highest paid coach in Conference USA.

== Schedule ==
| Date | Time | Opponent | Site | TV | Result | Attendance |
|---|---|---|---|---|---|---|
| August 29 | 7:00 p.m. | at Rice | Rice Stadium; Houston, TX (rivalry) | ESPN | L 27–56 | 23,164 |
| September 6 | 7:00 p.m. | Texas State* | Gerald J. Ford Stadium; University Park, TX | | W 47–36 | 22,218 |
| September 13 | 6:00 p.m. | at No. 12 Texas Tech* | Jones AT&T Stadium; Lubbock, TX | FSN | L 7–43 | 53,383 |
| September 20 | 7:00 p.m. | TCU* | Gerald J. Ford Stadium; University Park, TX (rivalry) | CBSSN | L 7–48 | 30,923 |
| September 25 | 7:00 p.m. | at Tulane | Louisiana Superdome; New Orleans, LA | CBSSN | L 27–34 | 25,643 |
| October 4 | 2:30 p.m. | at UCF | Bright House Networks Stadium; Orlando, FL | CBSSN | L 17–31 | 43,147 |
| October 11 | 2:00 p.m. | Tulsa | Gerald J. Ford Stadium; University Park, TX | | L 31–37 | 13,020 |
| October 18 | 7:00 p.m. | Houston | Gerald J. Ford Stadium; University Park, TX (rivalry) | | L 38–44 | 18,972 |
| October 25 | 2:30 p.m. | at Navy* | Navy–Marine Corps Memorial Stadium; Annapolis, MD (Gansz Trophy) | CBSSN | L 7–34 | 31,698 |
| November 8 | 2:00 p.m. | Memphis^{†} | Gerald J. Ford Stadium; University Park, TX | | L 26–31 | 18,224 |
| November 15 | 8:05 p.m. | at UTEP | Sun Bowl Stadium; El Paso, TX | | L 10–36 | 30,271 |
| November 29 | 2:00 p.m. | Southern Miss | Gerald J. Ford Stadium; University Park, TX | | L 12–28 | 13,020 |
*Non-conference game; ^{†}Homecoming; Rankings from AP Poll released prior to the game; All times are in Central time

== Roster ==
2008 SMU Mustangs football team roster
Players
Coaches
Offense

| Pos. | # | Name | Class |
|---|---|---|---|
| RB | 32 | Ryan Armstrong | Fr |
| OL | 70 | Kelvin Beachum | Fr |
| WR | 82 | Cole Beasley | Fr |
| OL | 75 | Zach Boyd | Fr |
| OL | 79 | J. T. Brooks | Fr |
| WR | 23 | Josh Bryant | So |
| TE | 83 | Phillip Burley | So |
| RB | 1 | Chris Butler | So |
| OL | 62 | Jimmy Chase | So |
| OL | 60 | Vincent Chase | Sr |
| OL | 69 | Calvin Crockett | So |
| OL | 66 | Szymon Czerniak | Jr |
| OL | 76 | Will Densmore | Fr |
| WR | 85 | E. J. Drewery | Fr |
| OL | 56 | Billy Dugal | Fr |
| OL | 76 | Josh Emshoff | Fr |
| OL | 51 | Mitch Enright | Jr |
| OL | 78 | Jordan Free | Fr |
| QB | 6 | Winston Gamso | Fr |
| RB | 33 | Ben Goldthrope | Fr |
| WR | 34 | Bruce Greenberg | So |
| WR | 88 | Bradley Haynes | Fr |
| WR | 9 | Jessie Henderson | Sr |
| WR | 25 | La'Cori Johnson | Sr |
| WR | 7 | B. J. Lee | Fr |
| OL | 77 | Josh LeRibeus | Fr |
| OL | 74 | Sean Lobo | Sr |
| WR | 84 | Cole Loftin | Fr |
| WR | 4 | Bryce Lunday | Fr |
| RB | 8 | DeMyron Martin | Sr |
| OL | 63 | Blake McJunkin | Fr |
| RB | 45 | Andrew McKinney | Sr |
| WR | 26 | A'Darius Medford | So |
| OL | 82 | Austin Michelsen | Jr |
| QB | 3 | Bo Levi Mitchell | Fr |
| WR | 29 | Shaun Moore | So |
| QB | 6 | Michael Morse | Fr |

Defense

| Pos. | # | Name | Class |
|---|---|---|---|
| LB | 59 | Brendan Ahren | Fr |
| DE | 64 | Jesse Andrew | Jr |
| DB | 32 | Jay Angotti | Jr |
| DB | 2 | De'Von Bailey | So |
| DB | 22 | Chris Banjo | Fr |
| DB | 12 | Derrius Bell | So |
| LB | 54 | Taylor Bon | So |
| LB | 27 | Will Bonilla | Sr |
| DB | 23 | Chris Castro | Fr |
| DB | 18 | Chase Courtney | So |
| DB | 35 | Tim Crosby | So |
| DB | 10 | Rock Dennis | Jr |
| DE | 30 | Adrian Dizer | Jr |
| DL | 95 | Mickey Dollens | So |
| DT | 99 | Serge Elizee | Sr |
| DE | 44 | Andrew Ellison | Fr |
| DE | 89 | Patrick Fleming | So |
| LB | 52 | Pete Fleps | So |
| DE | 96 | Josh Geldert | So |
| DE | 90 | Kevin Grenier | Fr |
| DL | 94 | Patrick Handy | Sr |
| DB | 26 | Brett Haness | Fr |
| DB | 7 | David Haynes | Sr |
| LB | 36 | Julian Herron | Fr |
| DL | 97 | Evan Huahulu | Fr |
| LB | 34 | Jason Jackson | So |
| DE | 49 | Jordan Johnson | So |
| DB | 41 | Tyler Jones | So |
| LB | 43 | Victor Jones | Fr |
| LB | 29 | Chase Kennemer | Jr |
| LB | – | Zach Line | Fr |
| DB | 57 | Dylan McCann | Fr |
| DB | 6 | Deyon McElroy | Jr |
| LB | 39 | Ryan Moczygemba | So |
| DB | 15 | Robert Mojica | Fr |

Special teams

| Pos. | # | Name | Class |
|---|---|---|---|
| P, K | 4 | Kellis Cunningham | Jr |
| P | 11 | Andrew Galloway | Sr |
| P, K | 15 | Thomas Morstead | Sr |
| P, K | 1 | Matt Szymanski | Jr |
| LS | 65 | Jackson Taylor | Jr |

Head coach

- June Jones

Coordinators/assistant coaches

- Dan Morrison
  Offensive coordinator
- Tom Mason
  Defensive coordinator
- Frank Gansz
  Special teams
- Bert Hill
  Defensive line
- Dennis McKnight
  Offensive line
- Derrick Odum
  Secondary
- Jeff Reinebold
  Wide receivers
- Wes Suan
  Running backs

Legend

- (C) Team captain
- (S) Suspended
- (I) Ineligible
- Injured
- Redshirt

Roster

== Game summaries ==
=== At Rice ===
SMU Mustangs at Rice Owls – Game summary

| Quarter | 1 | 2 | 3 | 4 | Total |
|---|---|---|---|---|---|
| Mustangs | 13 | 0 | 7 | 7 | 27 |
| Owls | 14 | 14 | 28 | 0 | 56 |

at Rice Stadium, Houston, Texas

- Date: August 29
- Game time: 7:00 p.m. CDT
- Game attendance: 23,164
- TV: ESPN
- Recap, Box score

Game information

First quarter

- SMU – Aldrick Robinson 26-yard pass from Bo Levi Mitchell (Thomas Morstead kick), 10:55. Mustangs 7–0. Drive: 1 plays, 26 yards, 0:09.
- SMU – Bradley Haynes 19-yard pass from Bo Levi Mitchell (kick failed), 2:00. Mustangs 13–0. Drive: 7 plays, 71 yards, 3:28.
- RICE – James Casey 7-yard pass from Chase Clement (Clark Fangmeier kick), 0:52. Mustangs 13–7. Drive: 6 plays, 73 yards, 1:08.
- RICE – Patrick Randolph 35-yard pass from Chase Clement (Clark Fangmeier kick), 0:00. Owls 14–13. Drive: 1 play, 35 yards, 0:04.

Second quarter

- RICE – Jarrett Dillard 21-yard pass from Chase Clement (Clark Fangmeier kick), 9:11. Owls 21–13. Drive: 11 plays, 58 yards, 3:54.
- RICE – Corbin Smiter 12-yard pass from Chase Clement (Clark Fangmeier kick), 4:26. Owls 28–13. Drive: 8 plays, 80 yards, 2:25.

Third quarter

- SMU – Aldrick Robinson 22-yard pass from Bo Levi Mitchell (Thomas Morstead kick), 13:57. Owls 28–20. Drive: 3 plays, 23 yards, 0:56.
- RICE – Jarrett Dillard 9-yard pass from Chase Clement (Clark Fangmeier kick), 9:08. Owls 35–20. Drive: 11 plays, 74 yards, 4:49.
- RICE – James Casey 1-yard run (Clark Fangmeier kick), 8:41. Owls 42–20. Drive: 1 play, 1 yard, 0:04.
- RICE – Andrew Sendejo 55-yard interception return (Clark Fangmeier kick), 7:31. Owls 49–20.
- RICE – Jarrett Dillard 8-yard pass from Chase Clement (Clark Fangmeier kick), 0:33. Owls 56–20. Drive: 1 play, 8 yards, 0:04.

Fourth quarter

- SMU – Emmanuel Sanders 32-yard pass from Logan Turner (Thomas Morstead kick), 2:10. Owls 56–27. Drive: 8 plays, 88 yards, 3:43.

Top passers

- SMU – Bo Levi Mitchell – 25/43, 244 yards, 3 TD, 3 INT
- RICE – Chase Clement – 24/37, 258 yards, 6 TD

Top rushers

- SMU – DeMyron Martin – 8 rushes, 28 yards
- RICE – Chase Clement – 13 rushes, 87 yards

Top receivers

- SMU – Emmanuel Sanders – 8 receptions, 121 yards, TD
- RICE – Jarrett Dillard – 7 receptions, 89 yards, 3 TD

=== Texas State ===
Texas State Bobcats at SMU Mustangs – Game summary

| Quarter | 1 | 2 | 3 | 4 | Total |
|---|---|---|---|---|---|
| Bobcats | 0 | 13 | 9 | 14 | 36 |
| Mustangs | 14 | 16 | 3 | 14 | 47 |

at Gerald J. Ford Stadium, University Park, Texas

- Date: September 6
- Game time: 7:00 p.m. CDT
- Game attendance: 22,218
- Recap, Box score

Game information

First quarter

- SMU – Emmanuel Sanders 21-yard pass from Bo Levi Mitchell (Thomas Morstead kick), 11:18. Mustangs 7–0. Drive: 6 plays, 57 yards, 3:42.
- SMU – Aldrick Robinson 32-yard pass from Bo Levi Mitchell (Thomas Morstead kick), 4:26. Mustangs 14–0. Drive: 3 plays, 38 yards, 1:01.

Second quarter

- SMU – Emmanuel Sanders 8-yard pass from Bo Levi Mitchell (Thomas Morstead kick), 11:45. Mustangs 21–0. Drive: 1 play, 8 yards, 0:20.
- TXST – Karrington Bush 2-yard run (kick blocked), 3:33. Mustangs 21–6. Drive: 17 plays, 80 yards, 8:12.
- SMU – Derrius Bell 98-yard defensive 2-point conversion, 3:33. Mustangs 23–6.
- SMU – Emmanuel Sanders 35-yard pass from Bo Levi Mitchell (Thomas Morstead kick), 2:45. Mustangs 30–6. Drive: 3 plays, 56 yards, 0:48.
- TXST – Cameron Luke 9-yard pass from Clint Toon (Andrew Ireland kick), 0:02. Mustangs 30–13. Drive: 14 plays, 76 yards, 2:43.

Third quarter

- TXST – Cameron Luke 17-yard pass from Clint Toon (kick failed), 9:31. Mustangs 30–19. Drive: 3 plays, 67 yards, 1:15.
- SMU – Thomas Morstead 30-yard field goal, 5:44. Mustangs 33–19. Drive: 13 plays, 47 yards, 3:47.
- TXST – Andrew Ireland 34-yard field goal, 2:14. Mustangs 33–22. Drive: 7 plays, 57 yards, 3:23.

Fourth quarter

- SMU – DeMyron Martin 7-yard run (Thomas Morstead kick), 14:00. Mustangs 40–22. Drive: 7 plays, 60 yards, 3:09.
- TXST – Cameron Luke 29-yard pass from Clint Toon (Andrew Ireland kick), 10:38. Mustangs 40–29. Drive: 6 plays, 56 yards, 3:22.
- SMU – Aldrick Robinson 34-yard pass from Bo Levi Mitchell (Thomas Morstead kick), 7:12. Mustangs 47–29. Drive: 6 plays, 72 yards, 3:26.
- TXST – Karrington Bush 5-yard pass from Clint Toon (Andrew Ireland kick), 2:41. Mustangs 47–36. Drive: 11 plays, 75 yards, 4:31.

Top passers

- TXST – Clint Toon – 19/27, 225 yards, 4 TD, 2 INT
- SMU – Bo Levi Mitchell – 24/37, 370 yards, 5 TD

Top rushers

- TXST – Karrington Bush – 15 rushes, 111 yards, TD
- SMU – DeMyron Martin – 7 rushes, 44 yards, TD

Top receivers

- TXST – Cameron Luke – 6 receptions, 123 yards, 3 TD
- SMU – Aldrick Robinson – 8 receptions, 172 yards, 2 TD

=== At No. 12 Texas Tech ===
SMU Mustangs at No. 12 Texas Tech Red Raiders – Game summary

| Quarter | 1 | 2 | 3 | 4 | Total |
|---|---|---|---|---|---|
| Mustangs | 0 | 0 | 0 | 7 | 7 |
| No. 12 Red Raiders | 15 | 7 | 14 | 7 | 43 |

at Jones AT&T Stadium, Lubbock, Texas

- Date: September 13
- Game time: 6:00 p.m. CDT
- Game weather: 82 °F (28 °C), partly cloudy
- Game attendance: 53,383
- Referee: Adrian Hill
- TV: FSN
- Recap, Box score

Game information

First quarter

- TTU – Donnie Carona 35-yard field goal, 12:29. Red Raiders 3–0. Drive: 8 plays, 30 yards, 2:19.
- TTU – Baron Batch 43-yard run (kick failed), 6:36. Red Raiders 9–0. Drive: 2 plays, 46 yards, 0:45.
- TTU – Michael Crabtree 23-yard pass from Graham Harrell (pass failed), 5:39. Red Raiders 15–0. Drive: 2 plays, 21 yards, 0:37.

Second quarter

- TTU – Michael Crabtree 47-yard pass from Graham Harrell (Donnie Carona kick), 8:51. Red Raiders 22–0. Drive: 6 plays, 98 yards, 2:09.

Third quarter

- TTU – Michael Crabtree 50-yard pass from Graham Harrell (Donnie Carona kick), 13:30. Red Raiders 29–0. Drive: 4 plays, 72 yards, 1:30.
- TTU – Edward Britton 7-yard pass from Graham Harrell (Donnie Carona kick), 3:52. Red Raiders 36–0. Drive: 7 plays, 88 yards, 3:32.

Fourth quarter

- TTU – Detron Lewis 44-yard pass from Graham Harrell (Donnie Carona kick), 13:04. Red Raiders 43–0. Drive: 11 plays, 84 yards, 4:48.
- SMU – Aldrick Robinson 7-yard pass from Logan Turner (Thomas Morstead kick), 3:29. Red Raiders 43–7. Drive: 15 plays, 86 yards, 6:09.
- SMU – Bo Levi Mitchell – 13/24, 155 yards, 5 INT
- TTU – Graham Harrell – 31/48, 418 yards, 5 TD

Top rushers

- SMU – DeMyron Martin – 10 rushes, 33 yards
- TTU – Baron Batch – 10 rushes, 98 yards, TD

Top receivers

- SMU – Emmanuel Sanders – 8 receptions, 125 yards
- TTU – Michael Crabtree – 8 receptions, 164 yards, 3 TD

=== TCU ===
TCU Horned Frogs at SMU Mustangs – Game summary

| Quarter | 1 | 2 | 3 | 4 | Total |
|---|---|---|---|---|---|
| Horned Frogs | 14 | 6 | 14 | 14 | 48 |
| Mustangs | 0 | 0 | 7 | 0 | 7 |

at Gerald J. Ford Stadium, University Park, Texas

- Date: September 20
- Game time: 7:00 p.m. CDT
- Game attendance: 30,923
- TV: CBSSN
- Recap, Box score

Game information

First quarter

- TCU – Joseph Turner 4-yard run (Ross Evans kick), 12:21. Horned Frogs 7–0. Drive: 5 plays, 39 yards, 1:39.
- TCU – Jerry Hughes 24-yard interception return (Ross Evans kick), 9:15. Horned Frogs 14–0.

Second quarter

- TCU – Ross Evans 19-yard field goal, 6:04. Horned Frogs 17–0. Drive: 15 plays, 67 yards, 7:29.
- TCU – Ross Evans 23-yard field goal, 0:19. Horned Frogs 20–0. Drive: 14 plays, 62 yards, 3:31.

Third quarter

- TCU – Joseph Turner 4-yard run (Ross Evans kick), 10:37. Horned Frogs 27–0. Drive: 10 plays, 77 yards, 4:23.
- TCU – Andy Dalton 5-yadr run (Ross Evans kick), 7:06. Horned Frogs 34–0. Drive: 4 plays, 35 yards, 1:12.
- SMU – Cole Loftin 4-yard pass from Bo Levi Mitchell (Thomas Morstead kick), 5:25. Horned Frogs 34–7. Drive: 7 plays, 70 yards, 1:41.

Fourth quarter

- TCU – Evan Frosch 1-yard pass from Marcus Jackson (Ross Evans kick), 9:33. Horned Frogs 41–7. Drive: 15 plays, 83 yards, 7:44.
- TCU – Marcus Jackson 79-yard run (Ross Evans kick), 4:00. Horned Frogs 48–7. Drive: 3 plays, 86 yards, 1:38.

Top passers

- TCU – Andy Dalton – 16/25, 210 yards
- SMU – Bo Levi Mitchell – 20/36, 218 yards, TD, 2 INT

Top rushers

- TCU – Marcus Jackson – 7 rushes, 115 yards, TD
- SMU – Chris Butler – 2 rushes, 5 yards

Top receivers

- TCU – Aaron Brown – 4 receptions, 60 yards
- SMU – Aldrick Robinson – 4 receptions, 70 yards
