= 2008 Marshall Thundering Herd football team =

American college football season

2008 Marshall Thundering Herd football
- Conference: Conference USA
- East
- Record: 4–8 (3–5 C-USA)
- Head coach: Mark Snyder (4th season)
- Offensive coordinator: John Shannon
- Defensive coordinator: Rick Minter (1st season)
- Base defense: 3–4
- Home stadium: Joan C. Edwards Stadium

2008 Conference USA football standings
	Conf.			Overall
Team	W		L	W		L
East Division
East Carolina x$	6	–	2	9	–	5
Memphis	4	–	4	6	–	7
Southern Miss	4	–	4	7	–	6
UAB	3	–	5	4	–	8
UCF	3	–	5	4	–	8
Marshall	3	–	5	4	–	8
West Division
Tulsa xy	7	–	1	11	–	3
Rice x	7	–	1	10	–	3
Houston	6	–	2	8	–	5
UTEP	4	–	4	5	–	7
Tulane	1	–	7	2	–	10
SMU	0	–	8	1	–	11
Championship: East Carolina 27, Tulsa 24
$ – Conference champion; x – Division champion/co-champions; y – Championship game participant; Rankings from AP Poll

The 2008 Marshall Thundering Herd football team represented Marshall University in the 2008 NCAA Division I FBS football season. Marshall competed as a member of the East Division of Conference USA, and played their home games at Joan C. Edwards Stadium. The Thundering Herd were led by fourth-year head coach Mark Snyder. Marshall finished the season with a 4–8 record (3–5).

Before the season, Sports Illustrated ranked Marshall the 115th team in the FBS (out of 120) and predicted they would finish with a 1–11 record. Against 11th-ranked Wisconsin, the Herd led 14–0 in the second quarter, but gave up 51 unanswered points in the remainder of the game. Later in the season, Marshall upset Houston, 37–23, after having led 37–9 earlier in the final period. The following week, they lost in overtime to favorite East Carolina by a field goal, 19–16. Marshall held Rice quarterback Chase Clement to 84 passing yards in the first half, which was tied at 7, but went on to lose, 35–10. In the season closer, they proved competitive for eventual Conference USA runners-up Tulsa.

== Schedule ==
Date	Time	Opponent	Site	TV	Result	Attendance	Source
August 30	4:30 pm	Illinois State*	Joan C. Edwards Stadium; Huntington, WV	ESPN Plus	W 35–10	25,661	
September 6	12:00 pm	at No. 11 Wisconsin*	Camp Randall Stadium; Madison, WI	BTN	L 14–51	80,386	
September 13	7:00 pm	Memphis	Joan C. Edwards Stadium; Huntington, WV	CSS	W 17–16	27,349	
September 20	3:30 pm	at Southern Miss	M. M. Roberts Stadium; Hattiesburg, MS	CSS	W 34–27	28,178	
September 27	3:30 pm	at West Virginia*	Milan Puskar Stadium; Morgantown, WV (Friends of Coal Bowl)	ESPN Plus	L 3–27	60,154	
October 3	8:00 pm	Cincinnati*	Joan C. Edwards Stadium; Huntington, WV	ESPN	L 10–33	29,237	
October 18	4:00 pm	at UAB	Legion Field; Birmingham, AL		L 21–23	17,868	
October 28	8:00 pm	Houston	Joan C. Edwards Stadium; Huntington, WV	ESPN2	W 37–23	20,716	
November 8	3:30 pm	at East Carolina	Dowdy–Ficklen Stadium; Greenville, NC (rivalry)	CBSCS	L 16–19 ^{OT}	43,515	
November 15	4:30 pm	UCF	Joan C. Edwards Stadium; Huntington, WV	CSS	L 14–30	24,059	
November 22	3:30 pm	at Rice	Rice Stadium; Houston, TX	CBSCS	L 10–35	15,131	
November 29	3:30 pm	Tulsa	Joan C. Edwards Stadium; Huntington, WV		L 35–38	21,571	
*Non-conference game; Rankings from AP Poll released prior to the game; All times are in Eastern time
