= 2008 St. Petersburg Bowl =

2008 magicJack St. Petersburg Bowl
- Inaugural St. Petersburg Bowl
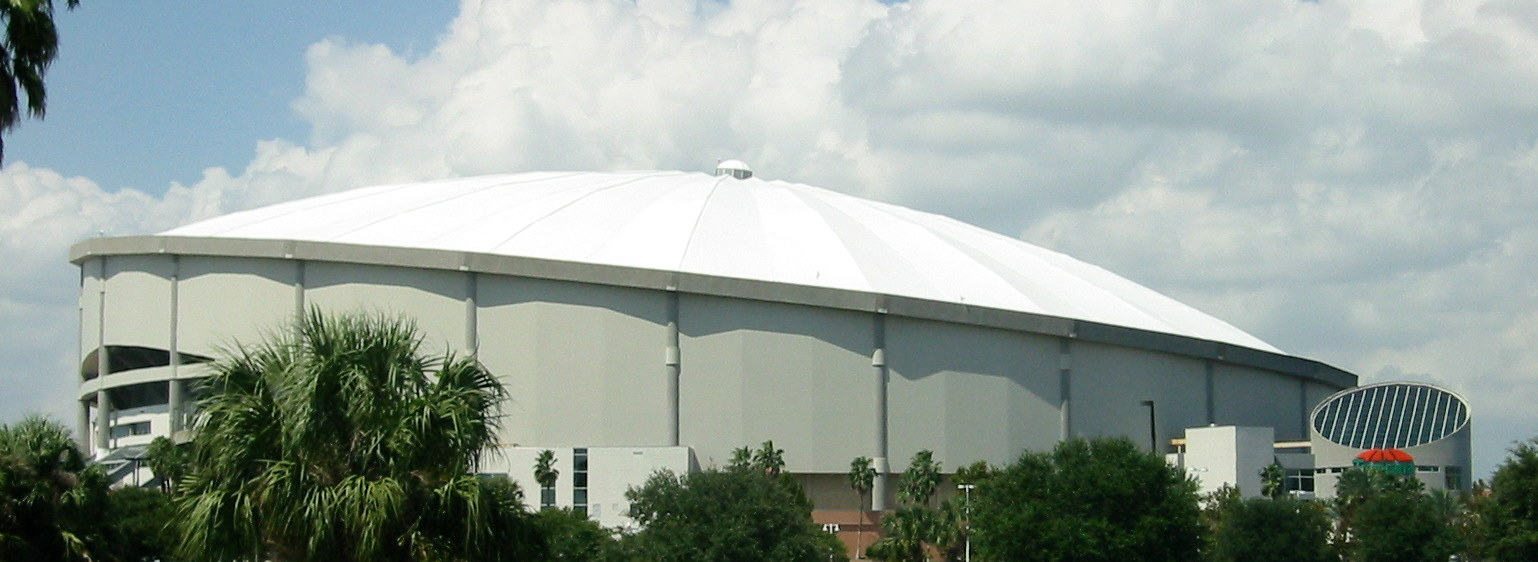
- Tropicana Field in St. Petersburg, Florida, hosted the St. Petersburg Bowl.
| Memphis Tigers | South Florida Bulls |
| (6–6) | (7–5) |
| C-USA | Big East |
| 14 | 41 |
| Head coach: Tommy West | Head coach: Jim Leavitt |
| | 1 | 2 | 3 | 4 | Total |
|---|---|---|---|---|---|
| Memphis | 7 | 7 | 0 | 0 | 14 |
| South Florida | 14 | 10 | 10 | 7 | 41 |
- Date: December 20, 2008
- Season: 2008
- Stadium: Tropicana Field
- Location: St. Petersburg, Florida
- MVP: QB Matt Grothe, South Florida
- Referee: Bill McCabe (WAC)
- Attendance: 25,205
- Payout: US$1,000,000 per team

United States TV coverage
- Network: ESPN2
- Announcers: Sean McDonough, Chris Spielman, Rob Stone
- Nielsen ratings: 1.1

The 2008 St. Petersburg Bowl was the inaugural edition of the new college football bowl game, and was played at Tropicana Field in St. Petersburg, Florida. The game was played beginning at 4:30 p.m. US EST on Saturday, December 20, 2008, and was telecast on ESPN2, saw the South Florida Bulls (based in nearby Tampa) defeat their former conference rivals Memphis Tigers, 41–14. Sean McDonough, Chris Spielman and Rob Stone called the game. For sponsorship reasons, the game was officially known as the 2008 magicJack St. Petersburg Bowl.

== Scoring summary ==
| Scoring Play | Score |
|---|---|
1st Quarter
| USF - Taurus Johnson 26 yard TD pass from Matt Grothe (Maikon Bonani kick), 13:58 | USF 7-0 |
| USF - Benjamin Williams 3 yard TD run (Bonani kick), 4:28 | USF 14-0 |
| Memphis - Arkelon Hall 3 yard TD run (Matt Reagan kick), 2:09 | USF 14-7 |
2nd Quarter
| USF - Bonani 22 yard FG, 11:18 | USF 17-7 |
| USF - Ben Busbee 13 yard TD pass from Grothe (Bonani kick), 4:15 | USF 24-7 |
| Memphis - Duke Calhoun 2 yard TD pass from Hall (Reagan kick), :08 | USF 24-14 |
3rd Quarter
| USF - Bonani 37 yard FG, 8:36 | USF 27-14 |
| USF - Dontavia Bogan 24 yard TD pass from Grothe (Bonani kick), 1:50 | USF 34-14 |
4th Quarter
| USF - Moise Plancher 2 yard TD run (Bonani kick), 12:40 | USF 41-14 |
