= 2008 Tulsa Golden Hurricane football team =

American college football season

2008 Tulsa Golden Hurricane football

C-USA West Division co-champion GMAC Bowl champion

C-USA Championship Game, L 24–27 vs. East Carolina

GMAC Bowl, W 45–13 vs. Ball State
- Conference: Conference USA
- West Division
- Record: 11–3 (7–1 C-USA)
- Head coach: Todd Graham (2nd season)
- Co-offensive coordinators: Herb Hand (2nd season); Gus Malzahn (2nd season)
- Offensive scheme: Spread option
- Defensive coordinator: Keith Patterson (3rd season)
- Co-defensive coordinator: Paul Randolph (2nd season)
- Base defense: 3–3–5
- Home stadium: Skelly Field at H. A. Chapman Stadium

2008 Conference USA football standings
	Conf.			Overall
Team	W		L	W		L
East Division
East Carolina x$	6	–	2	9	–	5
Memphis	4	–	4	6	–	7
Southern Miss	4	–	4	7	–	6
UAB	3	–	5	4	–	8
UCF	3	–	5	4	–	8
Marshall	3	–	5	4	–	8
West Division
Tulsa xy	7	–	1	11	–	3
Rice x	7	–	1	10	–	3
Houston	6	–	2	8	–	5
UTEP	4	–	4	5	–	7
Tulane	1	–	7	2	–	10
SMU	0	–	8	1	–	11
Championship: East Carolina 27, Tulsa 24
$ – Conference champion; x – Division champion/co-champions; y – Championship game participant; Rankings from AP Poll

The 2008 Tulsa Golden Hurricane football team represented the University of Tulsa in the 2008 NCAA Division I FBS football season. The team's head coach was Todd Graham, in his second year at Tulsa. They played home games at Skelly Field at H. A. Chapman Stadium in Tulsa, Oklahoma and competed in the West Division of Conference USA (C-USA).

== Schedule ==
Date	Time	Opponent	Rank	Site	TV	Result	Attendance
August 30	3:00 pm	at UAB		Legion Field; Birmingham, AL		W 45–0	19,672
September 6	6:05 pm	at North Texas*		Fouts Field; Denton, TX		W 56–26	22,785
September 20	6:05 pm	New Mexico*		Skelly Field at H. A. Chapman Stadium; Tulsa, OK		W 56–14	30,000
September 27	6:05 pm	Central Arkansas*		Skelly Field at H. A. Chapman Stadium; Tulsa, OK		W 62–34	20,646
October 4	7:00 pm	Rice^{†}		Skelly Field at H. A. Chapman Stadium; Tulsa, OK	CBSCS	W 63–28	24,926
October 11	7:05 pm	at SMU		Gerald J. Ford Stadium; University Park, TX		W 37–31	15,324
October 18	7:00 pm	UTEP		Skelly Field at H. A. Chapman Stadium; Tulsa, OK	CBSCS	W 77–35	21,873
October 26	7:00 pm	UCF	No. 22	Skelly Field at H. A. Chapman Stadium; Tulsa, OK	ESPN	W 49–19	30,000
November 1	1:00 pm	at Arkansas*	No. 19	Donald W. Reynolds Razorback Stadium; Fayetteville, AR		L 23–30	70,021
November 15	7:00 pm	at Houston	No. 25	Robertson Stadium; Houston, TX	CBSCS	L 30–70	20,855
November 22	2:00 pm	Tulane		Chapman Stadium; Tulsa, OK		W 56–7	20,391
November 29	2:30 pm	at Marshall		Joan C. Edwards Stadium; Huntington, WV		W 38–35	21,571
December 6	12:00 pm	East Carolina		Chapman Stadium; Tulsa, OK (Conference USA Championship Game)	ESPN	L 24–27	22,740
January 6	7:00 pm	vs. No. 23 Ball State*		Ladd–Peebles Stadium; Mobile, AL (GMAC Bowl)	ESPN	W 45–13	32,816
*Non-conference game; ^{†}Homecoming; Rankings from AP Poll released prior to the game; All times are in Central time

== Game summaries ==
=== UAB ===
	1	2	3	4	Total
Tulsa	7	14	14	10	45
UAB	13	9	0	0	22

=== North Texas ===
	1	2	3	4	Total
Tulsa	14	28	7	7	56
North Texas	7	3	3	13	26

=== New Mexico ===
	1	2	3	4	Total
New Mexico	0	0	7	7	14
Tulsa	21	14	7	14	56

=== UCA ===
	1	2	3	4	Total
UCA	10	10	6	8	34
Tulsa	14	14	17	17	62

=== Rice ===
	1	2	3	4	Total
Rice	7	7	7	7	28
Tulsa	7	14	21	21	63

=== SMU ===
	1	2	3	4	Total
Tulsa	3	10	11	13	37
SMU	7	10	14	0	31

=== UTEP ===
	1	2	3	4	Total
UTEP	28	0	7	0	35
Tulsa	28	21	21	7	77

=== UCF ===
	1	2	3	4	Total
UCF	0	19	0	0	19
#22 Tulsa	7	7	21	14	49

=== Arkansas ===
	1	2	3	4	Total
#19 Tulsa	7	13	3	0	23
Arkansas	17	6	7	0	30

=== Houston ===
	1	2	3	4	Total
#25 Tulsa	0	17	13	0	30
Houston	14	28	21	7	70

=== Tulane ===
	1	2	3	4	Total
Tulane	0	7	0	0	7
Tulsa	14	14	21	7	56

=== Marshall ===
	1	2	3	4	Total
Tulsa	7	14	14	3	38
Marshall	7	14	14	0	35
