= 2008 Memphis Tigers football team =

American college football season

2008 Memphis Tigers football

St. Petersburg Bowl, L 14–41, vs. South Florida
- Conference: Conference USA
- East
- Record: 6–7 (4–4 Conference USA)
- Head coach: Tommy West (8th season)
- Offensive coordinator: Clay Helton (2nd season)
- Offensive scheme: Spread
- Defensive coordinator: Tim Walton (1st season)
- Base defense: Multiple 4–3
- Home stadium: Liberty Bowl Memorial Stadium

2008 Conference USA football standings
| | Conf. | | | Overall |
| Team | W | | L | W | | L |
|---|---|---|---|---|---|---|
East Division
| East Carolina x$ | 6 | – | 2 | 9 | – | 5 |
| Memphis | 4 | – | 4 | 6 | – | 7 |
| Southern Miss | 4 | – | 4 | 7 | – | 6 |
| UAB | 3 | – | 5 | 4 | – | 8 |
| UCF | 3 | – | 5 | 4 | – | 8 |
| Marshall | 3 | – | 5 | 4 | – | 8 |
West Division
| Tulsa xy | 7 | – | 1 | 11 | – | 3 |
| Rice x | 7 | – | 1 | 10 | – | 3 |
| Houston | 6 | – | 2 | 8 | – | 5 |
| UTEP | 4 | – | 4 | 5 | – | 7 |
| Tulane | 1 | – | 7 | 2 | – | 10 |
| SMU | 0 | – | 8 | 1 | – | 11 |
Championship: East Carolina 27, Tulsa 24
$ – Conference champion; x – Division champion/co-champions; y – Championship game participant; Rankings from AP Poll

The 2008 Memphis Tigers football team represented the University of Memphis in the 2008 NCAA Division I FBS football season. Memphis competed as a member of the Conference USA. The team was led by head coach Tommy West. The Tigers played their home games at the Liberty Bowl Memorial Stadium. The Tigers finished the regular season with a 6–6 record, which was enough to attain bowl eligibility. Memphis accepted a bid to play against South Florida in the inaugural St. Petersburg Bowl in St. Petersburg, Florida. The Tigers lost, 41–14.

== Schedule ==
| Date | Time | Opponent | Site | TV | Result | Attendance |
|---|---|---|---|---|---|---|
| August 30 | 6:00 pm | at Ole Miss* | Vaught–Hemingway Stadium; Oxford, MS (rivalry) | | L 24–41 | 56,127 |
| September 6 | 7:00 pm | Rice | Liberty Bowl Memorial Stadium; Memphis, TN | CBSCS | L 35–42 | 28,351 |
| September 13 | 6:00 pm | at Marshall | Joan C. Edwards Stadium; Huntington, WV | CSS | L 16–17 | 27,349 |
| September 20 | 7:00 pm | Nicholls State* | Liberty Bowl Memorial Stadium; Memphis, TN | | W 31–10 | 22,167 |
| September 27 | 1:00 pm | Arkansas State* | Liberty Bowl Memorial Stadium; Memphis, TN (Paint Bucket Bowl) | | W 29–17 | 26,376 |
| October 2 | 7:00 pm | at UAB | Legion Field; Birmingham, AL | CBSCS | W 33–30 | 19,901 |
| October 10 | 7:00 pm | Louisville* | Liberty Bowl Memorial Stadium; Memphis, TN (rivalry) | ESPN | L 28–35 | 40,248 |
| October 18 | 11:00 am | at East Carolina | Dowdy–Ficklen Stadium; Greenville, NC | CSS | L 10–30 | 41,216 |
| October 25 | 7:00 pm | Southern Miss | Liberty Bowl Memorial Stadium; Memphis, TN (Black and Blue Bowl) | CBSCS | W 36–30 | 24,034 |
| November 8 | 2:00 pm | at SMU | Gerald Ford Stadium; University Park, TX | | W 31–26 | 18,224 |
| November 22 | 1:00 pm | UCF | Liberty Bowl Memorial Stadium; Memphis, TN | | L 21–28 | 18,836 |
| November 29 | 2:30 pm | Tulane | Liberty Bowl; Memphis, TN | CSS | W 45–6 | 15,012 |
| December 20 | 3:30 pm | vs. South Florida* | Tropicana Field; St. Petersburg, FL (St. Petersburg Bowl) | ESPN2 | L 14–41 | 25,205 |
*Non-conference game; All times are in Eastern time

== Game summaries ==
=== Mississippi ===
| | 1 | 2 | 3 | 4 | Total |
|---|---|---|---|---|---|
| Memphis | 7 | 3 | 0 | 14 | 24 |
| Ole Miss | 14 | 13 | 7 | 7 | 41 |

Recap: Ole Miss tops Memphis to give Nutt win in debut

=== Rice ===
| | 1 | 2 | 3 | 4 | Total |
|---|---|---|---|---|---|
| Rice | 3 | 0 | 10 | 29 | 42 |
| Memphis | 0 | 14 | 7 | 14 | 35 |

Recap: Rice 42, Memphis 35

=== Marshall ===
| | 1 | 2 | 3 | 4 | Total |
|---|---|---|---|---|---|
| Memphis | 0 | 3 | 10 | 3 | 16 |
| Marshall | 7 | 3 | 7 | 0 | 17 |

Recap: Memphis 16, Marshall 17

=== Nicholls State ===
| | 1 | 2 | 3 | 4 | Total |
|---|---|---|---|---|---|
| Nicholls State | 0 | 10 | 0 | 0 | 10 |
| Memphis | 3 | 7 | 7 | 14 | 31 |

Recap: Nicholls State 10, Memphis 31

=== Arkansas State ===
| | 1 | 2 | 3 | 4 | Total |
|---|---|---|---|---|---|
| Arkansas St. | 0 | 17 | 0 | 0 | 17 |
| Memphis | 13 | 3 | 3 | 10 | 29 |

Recap: Memphis 29, Arkansas St. 17

=== Alabama-Birmingham ===
| | 1 | 2 | 3 | 4 | Total |
|---|---|---|---|---|---|
| Memphis | 0 | 20 | 7 | 6 | 33 |
| UAB | 10 | 6 | 7 | 7 | 30 |

Recap: Memphis 33, UAB 30

=== Louisville ===
| | 1 | 2 | 3 | 4 | Total |
|---|---|---|---|---|---|
| Louisville | 0 | 28 | 0 | 7 | 35 |
| Memphis | 7 | 7 | 14 | 0 | 28 |

Recap: Louisville's offense lags, so special teams and defense pick up slack vs. Memphis

=== East Carolina ===
| | 1 | 2 | 3 | 4 | Total |
|---|---|---|---|---|---|
| Memphis | 7 | 3 | 0 | 0 | 10 |
| ECU | 0 | 7 | 13 | 10 | 30 |

Recap: Memphis 10, East Carolina 30

=== Southern Mississippi ===
| | 1 | 2 | 3 | 4 | Total |
|---|---|---|---|---|---|
| Southern Mississippi | 0 | 10 | 7 | 13 | 30 |
| Memphis | 14 | 6 | 3 | 13 | 36 |

Recap: Steele (178 yards, 2 TDs) keys Memphis past Southern Miss

=== Southern Methodist ===
| | 1 | 2 | 3 | 4 | Total |
|---|---|---|---|---|---|
| Memphis | 14 | 0 | 7 | 10 | 31 |
| SMU | 7 | 6 | 7 | 6 | 26 |

Recap: Memphis 31, SMU 26

=== Central Florida ===
| | 1 | 2 | 3 | 4 | Total |
|---|---|---|---|---|---|
| UCF | 14 | 7 | 7 | 0 | 28 |
| Memphis | 7 | 0 | 7 | 7 | 21 |

Recap: UCF 28, Memphis 21

=== Tulane ===
| | 1 | 2 | 3 | 4 | Total |
|---|---|---|---|---|---|
| Tulane | 0 | 0 | 6 | 0 | 6 |
| Memphis | 14 | 14 | 10 | 7 | 45 |

Recap: Memphis 45, Tulane 6

=== South Florida (St. Petersburg Bowl) ===
| | 1 | 2 | 3 | 4 | Total |
|---|---|---|---|---|---|
| Memphis | 7 | 7 | 0 | 0 | 14 |
| South Florida | 14 | 10 | 10 | 7 | 41 |

Recap: Grothe throws for 236 yards, three TDs as South Florida dominates Memphis
