= 2008 Conference USA Football Championship Game =

- Conference Championship
East Carolina Pirates	Tulsa Golden Hurricane
(8–4)	(10–2)
27	24
Head coach: Skip Holtz	Head coach: Todd Graham
	1	2	3	4	Total
East Carolina	14	3	7	3	27
Tulsa	10	7	0	7	24
- Date: December 6, 2008
- Season: 2008
- Stadium: Skelly Field at H. A. Chapman Stadium
- Location: Tulsa, Oklahoma
- MVP: Travis Simmons (CB), ECU
- Favorite: Tulsa by 12.5
- Referee: Steve Barth
- Attendance: 22,740

United States TV coverage
- Network: ESPN2
- Announcers: Dave Pasch (play-by-play), Andre Ware (analyst)

2008 Conference USA football standings
	Conf.			Overall
Team	W		L	W		L
East Division
East Carolina x$	6	–	2	9	–	5
Memphis	4	–	4	6	–	7
Southern Miss	4	–	4	7	–	6
UAB	3	–	5	4	–	8
UCF	3	–	5	4	–	8
Marshall	3	–	5	4	–	8
West Division
Tulsa xy	7	–	1	11	–	3
Rice x	7	–	1	10	–	3
Houston	6	–	2	8	–	5
UTEP	4	–	4	5	–	7
Tulane	1	–	7	2	–	10
SMU	0	–	8	1	–	11
Championship: East Carolina 27, Tulsa 24
$ – Conference champion; x – Division champion/co-champions; y – Championship game participant; Rankings from AP Poll

The 2008 Conference USA Football Championship Game was played on December 6, 2008 at Chapman Stadium in Tulsa, Oklahoma to determine the 2008 football champion of the Conference USA (C-USA). The game featured the East Carolina Pirates, the East Division champions, and the Tulsa Golden Hurricane, the West Division champions. The game kicked off at 12:00 pm EST and was televised by ESPN2.

== Scoring summary ==
Scoring summary

Quarter	Time	Drive			Team	Scoring information	Score	
Quarter	Time	Plays	Yards	TOP	Team	Scoring information	East Carolina	Tulsa
1	10:02			4:51	ECU	Kevin Gidrey 83-yard touchdown reception from Patrick Pinkney, Ben Hartman kick good	7	0
1	6:59		72		ECU	Interception returned 72 yards for touchdown by Travis Simmons, Ben Hartman kick good	14	0
1	2:28		72	4:31	Tulsa	Tarrion Adams 1-yard touchdown run, Jarod Tracy kick good	14	7
1	0:11		18	2:17	Tulsa	37-yard field goal by Jarod Tracy	14	10
2	10:40		58	3:57	Tulsa	Tarrion Adams 1-yard touchdown run, Jarod Tracy kick good	14	17
2	4:46		41	2:04	ECU	32-yard field goal by Ben Hartman	17	17
3	11:40		64	0:11	ECU	Norman Whitley 69-yard touchdown run, Ben Hartman kick good	24	17
4	8:46		80	4:44	Tulsa	Jacob Collums 8-yard touchdown reception from David Johnson, Jarod Tracy kick good	24	24
4	1:43		53	7:13	ECU	8-yard field goal by Ben Hartman	27	24
"TOP" = time of possession. For other American football terms, see Glossary of American football.							27	24
