= 2008 Southern Miss Golden Eagles football team =

American college football season

2008 Southern Miss Golden Eagles football

New Orleans Bowl champion

New Orleans Bowl, W 30–27 ^{OT} vs. Troy
- Conference: Conference USA
- East Division
- Record: 7–6 (4–4 C-USA)
- Head coach: Larry Fedora (1st season)
- Offensive coordinator: Darrell Wyatt (1st season)
- Offensive scheme: Spread
- Defensive coordinator: Todd Bradford (1st season)
- Base defense: 4–3
- Home stadium: M. M. Roberts Stadium

2008 Conference USA football standings
	Conf.			Overall
Team	W		L	W		L
East Division
East Carolina x$	6	–	2	9	–	5
Memphis	4	–	4	6	–	7
Southern Miss	4	–	4	7	–	6
UAB	3	–	5	4	–	8
UCF	3	–	5	4	–	8
Marshall	3	–	5	4	–	8
West Division
Tulsa xy	7	–	1	11	–	3
Rice x	7	–	1	10	–	3
Houston	6	–	2	8	–	5
UTEP	4	–	4	5	–	7
Tulane	1	–	7	2	–	10
SMU	0	–	8	1	–	11
Championship: East Carolina 27, Tulsa 24
$ – Conference champion; x – Division champion/co-champions; y – Championship game participant; Rankings from AP Poll

The 2008 Southern Miss Golden Eagles football team represented the University of Southern Mississippi in the 2008 NCAA Division I FBS football season. The Golden Eagles competed in the East Division of Conference USA, finished the season with a 7–6 overall record and a 4–4 conference record, and were led by first-year head coach Larry Fedora."2008 Southern Mississippi Golden Eagles Stats". Sports-Reference.com. Sports Reference LLC. They played their home games at M. M. Roberts Stadium in Hattiesburg, Mississippi. Southern Miss ended the season with a 30–27 overtime win over Troy in the 2008 New Orleans Bowl."Golden Eagles Rally For 30-27 OT Win in R+L Carriers New Orleans Bowl". SouthernMiss.com. University of Southern Mississippi Athletics. December 21, 2008.

== Season summary ==
The 2008 season was Fedora's first as Southern Miss head coach. Southern Miss listed Fedora as head coach, Darrell Wyatt as offensive coordinator and wide receivers coach, and Todd Bradford as defensive coordinator and secondary coach on its 2008 football coaching staff."2008 Football Coaching Staff". SouthernMiss.com. University of Southern Mississippi Athletics. January 15, 2008.

Southern Miss began the season 2–6 before winning its final four regular-season games to become bowl eligible. The Golden Eagles then defeated Troy, 30–27, in overtime in the New Orleans Bowl, finishing the season on a five-game winning streak. Sports-Reference lists Southern Miss at 7–6 overall, 4–4 in Conference USA play, with 398 points scored and 313 points allowed.

The New Orleans Bowl was decided in overtime after Britt Barefoot made a 39-yard field goal for Southern Miss and Michael McGee blocked Troy's potential game-tying field goal attempt.

== Schedule ==
Source: FBSchedules"2008 Southern Miss Football Schedule". FBSchedules.com.

Date	Time	Opponent	Site	TV	Result	Attendance
August 30	6:00 pm	Louisiana-Lafayette*	M. M. Roberts Stadium; Hattiesburg, MS		W 51–21	32,792
September 6	11:30 am	at No. 9 Auburn*	Jordan–Hare Stadium; Auburn, AL	LFS	L 13–27	87,451
September 13	6:00 pm	at Arkansas State*	ASU Stadium; Jonesboro, AR		W 27–24	25,938
September 20	2:30 pm	Marshall	M. M. Roberts Stadium; Hattiesburg, MS	CSS	L 27–34	28,178
October 4	6:00 pm	UTEP	M. M. Roberts Stadium; Hattiesburg, MS		L 37–40 ^{2OT}	28,788
October 11	7:00 pm	No. 15 Boise State*	M. M. Roberts Stadium; Hattiesburg, MS	CBSCS	L 7–24	30,912
October 18	2:00 pm	at Rice	Rice Stadium; Houston, TX		L 40–45	11,117
October 25	7:00 pm	at Memphis	Liberty Bowl; Memphis, TN (Black and Blue Bowl)	CBSCS	L 30–36	24,034
November 1	7:00 pm	UAB^{†}	M. M. Roberts Stadium; Hattiesburg, MS	CSS	W 70–14	29,281
November 8	2:30 pm	at UCF	Bright House Networks Stadium; Orlando, FL		W 17–6	41,652
November 15	2:00 pm	East Carolina	M. M. Roberts Stadium; Hattiesburg, MS		W 21–3	30,658
November 29	2:00 pm	at SMU	Gerald J. Ford Stadium; Dallas, TX		W 28–12	13,020
December 21	7:00 pm	vs. Troy*	Louisiana Superdome; New Orleans, LA (New Orleans Bowl)	ESPN	W 30–27 ^{OT}	30,197
*Non-conference game; ^{†}Homecoming; Rankings from Coaches' Poll released prior to the game; All times are in Central time
