= 2010 UFL championship game =

| Florida Tuskers (5–3) | Las Vegas Locomotives (5–3) |
|---|---|
| 20 | 23 |
| Head coach: Jay Gruden | Head coach: Jim Fassel |
| | 1 | 2 | 3 | 4 | Total |
|---|---|---|---|---|---|
| FL | 10 | 0 | 7 | 3 | 20 |
| LV | 7 | 7 | 7 | 2 | 23 |
- Date: November 27, 2010
- Stadium: Johnny Rosenblatt Stadium; Omaha, NE
- MVP: Chase Clement
- Referee: Perry Havener
- Attendance: 15,310

Ceremonies
- National anthem: Jimmy Weber
- Coin toss: Marlin Briscoe
- Halftime show: George Clinton and Parliament Funkadelic

TV in the United States
- Network: Versus
- Announcers: Craig Minervini (play-by-play); Doug Flutie (color analysis); Damon Hack & Ryan Nece (reports)

The 2010 UFL championship game was the concluding game of the United Football League's 2010 season. The game was staged at Johnny Rosenblatt Stadium in Omaha, Nebraska on Saturday, November 27, 2010, and saw the Las Vegas Locomotives repeat as league champions, defeating the Florida Tuskers by a 23–20 score.

== Background ==
The UFL did not settle on a championship game site until mid-season, choosing to rely on a formula that took into consideration "advance ticket and merchandise sales, energy for all events prior to the season starting, and team record" to determine a site. The Omaha Nighthawks, who hosted the first sellout game in league history and the first game with over 20,000 tickets sold, were chosen as the hosts for the championship game on October 18, 2010. The game was the last scheduled event at Johnny Rosenblatt Stadium, which served as the Nighthawks' home field in 2010 (the team moved to TD Ameritrade Park in 2011). The selection of Omaha required the UFL to move the date for the title game, from Friday, November 26 to Saturday, November 27 (the former date stood in conflict with a Nebraska Cornhuskers home game in Lincoln, a rivalry game with Colorado that is traditionally held on the day after Thanksgiving).

Las Vegas, the UFL's defending champions, lost their season opener to Florida, 27–20, but pulled off a five-game winning streak after a Week 2 bye, securing a berth in the title game after Week 7. Before earning that spot, however, starting quarterback Tim Rattay went down with a ruptured Achilles tendon, and was placed on the injured reserve list. With Rattay out for the rest of the season, the Locos relied on backup quarterbacks Drew Willy and Chase Clement for the team's final three regular season games, the last two of which resulted in losses, giving the Locos a 5–3 record going into the title game.

The Tuskers, who lost to the Locos in the 2009 title game and were now under the leadership of new coach Jay Gruden, began with the aforementioned Week 1 win at Las Vegas that was followed by late-second losses at Sacramento and to Las Vegas at home. Going into Week 8, the Tuskers had a 2–3 record and were in danger of being eliminated from playoff contention. At that point, the Tuskers decided to sideline 2009 league MVP Brooks Bollinger, who was suffering from a rib injury, in favor of backup Chris Greisen. The Tuskers would pull off convincing home wins over Omaha and Hartford, but still needed a 27–10 win at Omaha on Week 10 to secure a championship game berth. (Had the Tuskers lost, Sacramento would have advanced on tiebreakers.)

== Game recap ==
=== First half ===
The game started on a furious pace, with Florida taking the ball first and going on a 12-play, 84-yard scoring drive that ended with Tuskers quarterback Chris Greisen dodging a Las Vegas blitz for a five-yard touchdown run that gave the Tuskers a 7–0 lead. On the second play of the ensuing drive, Locos quarterback Chase Clement connected with a wide-open Andrae Thurman for a 75-yard touchdown pass, the longest Locos offensive play of the year, to tie the game at 7–7. The Tuskers then went on another lengthy scoring drive, ending with a 22-yard field goal by Nick Novak to give the Tuskers a 10–7 lead with 3:13 left in the first quarter.

The pace of the game would then start to slow down with no scoring until 5:56 remained in the second quarter; ending the Locos' first sustained drive of the game (including converting three third downs into first downs), Clement executed a play-action fake and found another wide-open receiver, tight end George Wrighster, from 30 yards out for a 14–10 Locos lead. Things got a little heated on the ensuing Tusker drive, with Florida hampered by a 15-yard personal foul to receiver John Standeford before punting to the Locos. Las Vegas then executed a drive that saw them move down to the Florida 13; the drive stalled, however, with a false start penalty (five yards and a 10-second run-off of the clock) leading to a pass attempt by Clement winding up out of the end zone as time expired in the first half (after which Locos coach Jim Fassel was heard insisting to the referee that :01 was left, enough time for the Locos to run one more offensive play before heading to the locker rooms).

=== Second half ===
The pace of the game would pick up again in the third quarter. After a three-and-out Locos' drive began the second half, the Tuskers took the ball down the field for another scoring drive, ending with a two-yard scramble for a touchdown by Greisen, his second scoring run of the day, to give Florida a 17–14 lead. The Locos would retake the lead on the next drive, a five-play, 61-yard march ending with two plays by running back Hakim Hill, a 13-yard reception immediately followed by a 37-yard run down the right sidelines that gave the Locos a 21–17 lead with 5:53 left in the third quarter. (Hill and Marcel Shipp handled the running load in place of DeDe Dorsey, who did not play due to knee and thigh injuries.)

The following two drives ended with passing errors; a Tusker drive ended when Adrian Awasom broke up a Griesen pass on fourth-and-two at the Vegas 35, but the next Locos drive ended with Florida defensive back Keiwan Ratliff intercepting a pass intended for Brian Hernandez with 1:55 elapsed in the fourth quarter. Ratliff's interception, the only turnover of the game, turned into a Tuskers offensive drive that led them to the Las Vegas 4-yard line (thanks to a 36-yard reception by Maurice Hicks and resulted in a 21-yard field goal by Nick Novak that drew Florida to within 21–20 of Las Vegas with 7:48 left in regulation.

A three-and-out by the Locos gave the Tuskers the ball back, but on first-and-10 at their own 14, a low shotgun snap got past Greisen, who recovered in his end zone only to be sacked by Josh Cooper for a Las Vegas safety and a 23–20 score. The ensuing Locos drive ended in a punt, after which Greisen and the Tuskers, starting on their own 10 with 1:47 left, marched down to the Vegas 22 (the end point of a 23-yard throw to Cortez Hankton). After two incomplete passes (a spike by Greisen and an attempt in the end zone to Calvin Russell, who was tightly covered—and may have been interfered with—by Coye Francies), Nick Novak came on to attempt a 40-yard game-tying field goal with :06 remaining; a delay of game penalty pushed Novak and the Tuskers back five yards to the Vegas 27, where Novak's kick from 45 yards out on the final play of the game was blocked by Alfred Malone and recovered by the Locos, giving Las Vegas a 23–20 victory and their second consecutive UFL title.

== Scoring summary ==
| Team | Qtr | Scoring info | FL | LV |
|---|---|---|---|---|
| FL | 1st | Greisen 5-yard TD run (Novak kick) | 7 | 0 |
| LV | 1st | Thurman 75-yard TD pass from Clement (Hauschka kick) | 7 | 7 |
| FL | 1st | Novak 22-yard FG | 10 | 7 |
| LV | 2nd | Wrighster 30-yard TD pass from Clement (Hauschka kick) | 10 | 14 |
| FL | 3rd | Greisen 2-yard TD run (Novak kick) | 17 | 14 |
| LV | 3rd | Hakim Hill 37-yard TD run (Hauschka kick) | 17 | 21 |
| FL | 4th | Novak 22-yard FG | 20 | 21 |
| LV | 4th | Safety (Cooper sacks Griesen in end zone) | 20 | 23 |

== Most Valuable Player ==
Locomotives quarterback Chase Clement was awarded the UFL championship game's Most Valuable Player award after the game. Clement went 16-for-25 for 237 yards, two touchdowns and one interception, and added 30 yards on five carries.

== Broadcasting ==
On television, the game was carried on Versus, with Craig Minervini on play-by-play, Doug Flutie handling color commentary, and Ryan Nece and Damon Hack reporting on the sidelines. The game also was simulcast in HD on YouTube, where viewers could watch four alternative camera angles as well as submit questions and comments via Facebook and Twitter, which were read off during Versus' commercial breaks by HDNet's UFL sideline reporter, Ron Kruck.

Radio coverage of the game was provided the Tuskers' and Locomotives' radio flagships (respectively, WTKS-FM in Orlando and KWWN in Las Vegas) as well as KOZN in Omaha, the flagship station of the Omaha Nighthawks.
