= 2008 UTEP Miners football team =

American college football season

2008 UTEP Miners football
- Conference: Conference USA
- West Division
- Record: 5–7 (4–4 C-USA)
- Head coach: Mike Price (5th season)
- Offensive coordinator: Bob Connelly (1st season)
- Offensive scheme: Spread
- Defensive coordinator: Osia Lewis (1st season)
- Base defense: 3–3–5
- Home stadium: Sun Bowl

2008 Conference USA football standings
	Conf.			Overall
Team	W		L	W		L
East Division
East Carolina x$	6	–	2	9	–	5
Memphis	4	–	4	6	–	7
Southern Miss	4	–	4	7	–	6
UAB	3	–	5	4	–	8
UCF	3	–	5	4	–	8
Marshall	3	–	5	4	–	8
West Division
Tulsa xy	7	–	1	11	–	3
Rice x	7	–	1	10	–	3
Houston	6	–	2	8	–	5
UTEP	4	–	4	5	–	7
Tulane	1	–	7	2	–	10
SMU	0	–	8	1	–	11
Championship: East Carolina 27, Tulsa 24
$ – Conference champion; x – Division champion/co-champions; y – Championship game participant; Rankings from AP Poll

The 2008 UTEP Miners football team represented the University of Texas at El Paso (UTEP) as a member of the West Division in Conference USA (C-USA) during the 2008 NCAA Division I FCS football season. Led by fifth-year head coach Mike Price, the Miners compiled an overall record of 5–7 with a mark of 4–4 in conference play, placing fourth in the C-USA's West Division. The team played home games at the Sun Bowl in El Paso, Texas.

UTEP averaged 37,296 fans per game, ranking 66th nationally.

== Schedule ==
Date	Time	Opponent	Site	TV	Result	Attendance
August 28	5:00 pm	at Buffalo*	University at Buffalo Stadium; Buffalo, NY	TWC	L 17–42	16,656
September 6	8:15 pm	No. 10 Texas*	Sun Bowl; El Paso, TX	ESPN2	L 13–42	53,415
September 20	7:05 pm	New Mexico State*	Sun Bowl; El Paso, TX (Battle of I-10)	TWC	L 34–33	42,930
September 27	6:00 pm	UCF	Sun Bowl; El Paso, TX	CBSCS	W 58–13	33,339
October 4	5:00 pm	at Southern Miss	M. M. Roberts Stadium; Hattiesburg, MS	TWC	W 40–37 ^{OT}	28,788
October 11	7:05 pm	Tulane^{†}	Sun Bowl; El Paso, TX		W 24–21	33,121
October 18	6:00 pm	at Tulsa	Skelly Field at H. A. Chapman Stadium; Tulsa, OK	CBSCS	L 35–77	21,873
November 1	7:05 pm	Rice	Sun Bowl; El Paso, TX		L 33–34	30,702
November 8	5:00 pm	at Louisiana–Lafayette*	Cajun Field; Lafayette, LA	CSS	W 37–24	21,065
November 15	7:05 pm	SMU	Sun Bowl; El Paso, TX		W 36–10	30,271
November 22	1:30 pm	at Houston	Robertson Stadium; Houston, TX		L 37–42	18,134
November 28	11:00 am	at East Carolina	Dowdy–Ficklen Stadium; Greenville, NC	CBSCS	L 42–45	38,098
*Non-conference game; ^{†}Homecoming; Rankings from AP Poll released prior to the game; All times are in Mountain time

== Game summaries ==
=== Buffalo ===
	1	2	3	4	Total
Miners	0	14	3	0	17
Bulls	14	7	7	14	42

In their first trip to the state of New York, UTEP rolled up 266 yards but had three turnovers while the Bulls' Drew Willy threw four touchdown passes to help Buffalo to a 42–17 victory over the Minders. Willy complete 10-of-16 passing attempts for 221 passing yards and no interceptions. His first completion of the game broke Cliff Scott's school record for career completions. The UTEP defense surrendered 484 total yards.

=== Texas ===
	1	2	3	4	Total
#9 Longhorns	7	21	0	14	42
Miners	6	7	0	0	13

This game marks the first time for the Miners to play the Texas Longhorns. Texas holds a 2–0 record against the Miners, with the most recent game occurring in 1933 when the school was known as The Texas State School of Mines and Metallurgy. Besides both being in The University of Texas System the two schools also share the same alma mater, "The Eyes of Texas". While Miners' fans make a symbol called the "Pickaxe", with pinkie and thumb extended from a closed fist, the Longhorns have the Hook 'em Horns symbol.

After the Miners opened their season with a loss to the Buffalo Bulls 42–17, Miners coach Mike Price said of the upcoming game against the Longhorns, "Man, I hope they're not as good as Buffalo."

The kickoff for the game was set for 8:00 pm local time (Mountain Time) which is an unusually late start and which translates to 9:00 pm in Austin. Sports analysts have speculated that the Miners' excitement for the game, the crowd noise, the distance traveled, and time may pose a problem for Texas. They have also compared the game to Texas' 2007 road trip to Central Florida, which was a very close win for Texas. Longhorn defensive coordinator Will Muschamp said of the time slot, "Doesn't matter where we play, who we play or what time we play, Texas defense is gonna show up and play." The Dallas Morning News reported the game was one of the most anticipated games in UTEP history and "because season-ticket packages were available for $99, some Texas fans bought them in advance to avoid the hassle of a single-game purchase. The sales pushed UTEP to nearly 24,000 season tickets, a school record."

The morning of the game, Las Vegas sports books favored Texas by 27 points. The weather forecast called for a gametime temperature of 83 °F (28 °C) and mostly clear skies. The attendance was 53,415, the largest crowd ever at the Sun Bowl.

UTEP got the ball to start the game and scored a field goal. Texas was not able to secure a first down and punted back to Miners, who scored another field goal to take a 6–0 lead. On their second possession, Texas drove 80 yards for a touchdown on a McCoy pass to Quan Cosby. The extra point gave Texas a 7–6 lead which they still held at the end of the first quarter.

The Longhorns scored again ten seconds into the second quarter, as McCoy threw a 12-yard touchdown to wide receiver Dan Buckner. The Miners attempted a 65-yard field goal, but it fell short and Quan Cosby returned it 65 yards. Texas put John Chiles in as quarterback on the next series, and fullback Cody Johnson scored his second rushing touchdown of the season to make the score 21–6. With four minutes to go in the half, McCoy threw a touchdown pass to tight end Blaine Irby to make the score 28–6 with the extra point. UTEP scored a touchdown with 18 seconds remaining in the half, making the score 28–13 at half-time.

Texas got the ball to start the second half and drove to the UTEP 14-yard line when McCoy threw an interception in the UTEP end zone; it was his first interception of the season. Neither team scored in the third quarter.

The Horns faked a wide receiver screen and scored on a McCoy pass to Jordan Shipley to extend the lead to 35–13. On the next Miner possession, Emmanuel Acho forced a fumble and Roddrick Muckelroy returned it for a touchdown, making the score 42–13. UTEP missed a field goal to end their next possession. Texas punted on their next possession, and then took over on downs when UTEP was unable to score on their last possession. The Horns kept the ball on the ground and ran out the clock.

=== New Mexico State ===
	1	2	3	4	Total
New Mexico State	0	21	7	6	34
Miners	10	10	7	6	33

=== UCF ===
	1	2	3	4	Total
Knights	0	7	6	0	13
Miners	10	17	14	17	58

=== Southern Miss ===
	1	2	3	4	OT	Total
Miners	7	10	3	7	13	40
Eagles	14	0	7	6	10	37

=== Tulane ===
	1	2	3	4	Total
Green Wave	14	7	0	0	21
Miners	7	7	3	7	24

=== Tulsa ===
	1	2	3	4	Total
Miners	28	0	7	0	35
Golden Hurricane	28	21	21	7	77

=== Rice ===
	1	2	3	4	Total
Owls	14	14	7	14	49
Miners	17	3	10	14	44

=== Louisiana–Lafayette ===
	1	2	3	4	Total
Miners	7	9	14	7	37
Ragin' Cajuns	7	3	7	7	24

=== SMU ===
	1	2	3	4	Total
Mustangs	3	0	0	7	10
Miners	10	16	10	0	36

=== Houston ===
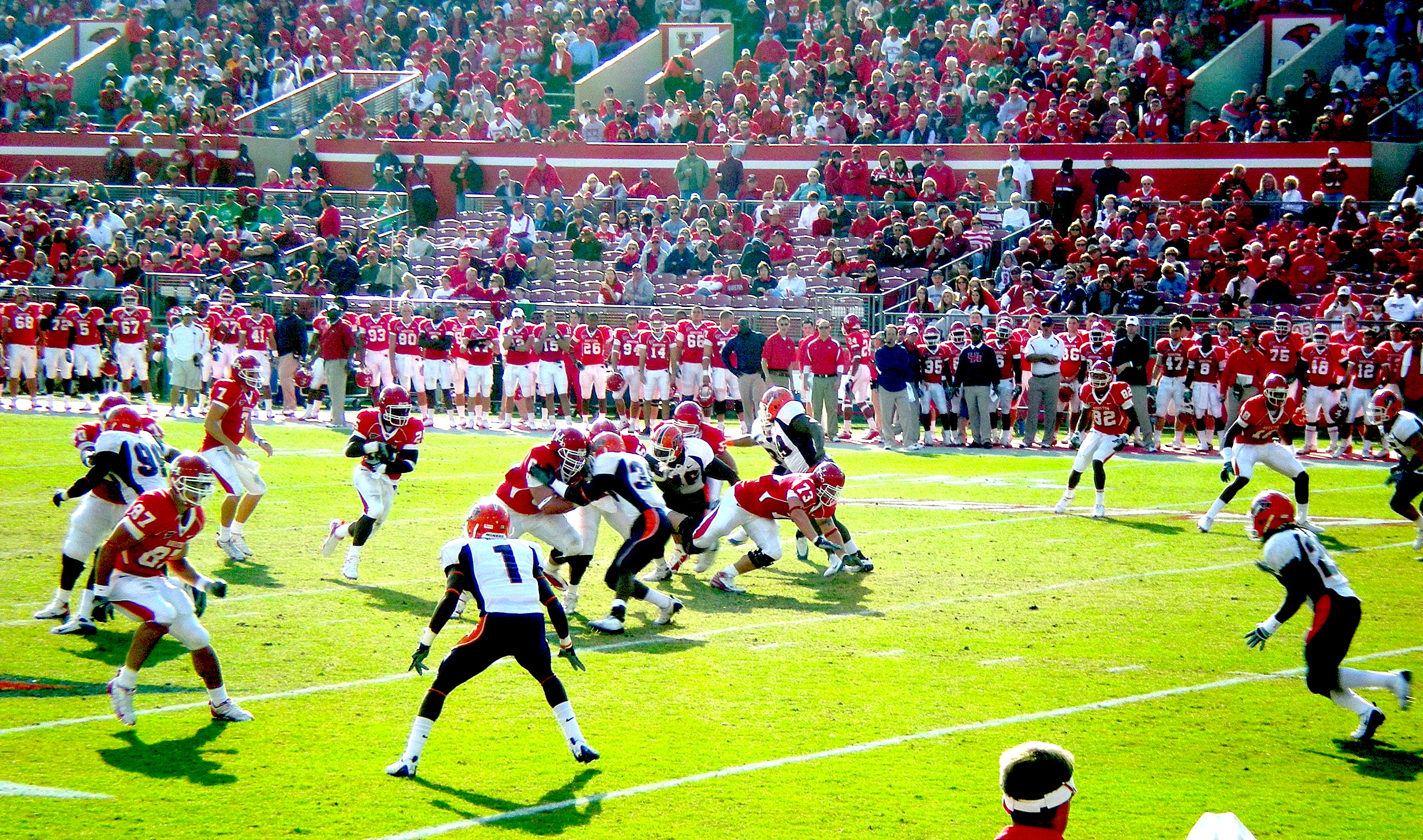
UTEP Miners at Robertson Stadium in Houston

	1	2	3	4	Total
Miners	7	14	7	9	37
Cougars	0	9	7	26	42

Although meeting for the first time during the Cougars' inaugural season in 1946, the UTEP Miners had only met with the Cougars five times in history. As Conference USA foes, the Cougars held a 2–3 all-time record against the Miners, whereas both wins came consecutively during the 2006 and 2007 meetings of the teams. Mike Price returned as the Miners' head coach this season. After a close game, where Houston lagged behind, the Cougars made a fourth quarter comeback to win the game.

=== East Carolina ===
	1	2	3	4	Total
Miners	0	7	7	7	21
Pirates	14	16	10	13	53

The Pirates welcome the Miners to Greenville for the first time ever. East Carolina and this Conference USA West opponent are meeting for the second time. The first meeting occurred last fall in El Paso, Texas. ECU won in overtime, 45–42 in the Sun Bowl.
