= 2008 Rice Owls football team =

American college football season

2008 Rice Owls football

C-USA West Division co-champion Texas Bowl champion

Texas Bowl, W 38–14 vs. Western Michigan
- Conference: Conference USA
- West
- Record: 10–3 (7–1 C-USA)
- Head coach: David Bailiff (2nd season)
- Offensive coordinator: Tom Herman (2nd season)
- Offensive scheme: Spread
- Defensive coordinator: Chuck Driesbach (2nd season)
- Co-defensive coordinator: Craig Naivar (2nd season)
- Base defense: 4–3
- Home stadium: Rice Stadium

2008 Conference USA football standings
	Conf.			Overall
Team	W		L	W		L
East Division
East Carolina x$	6	–	2	9	–	5
Memphis	4	–	4	6	–	7
Southern Miss	4	–	4	7	–	6
UAB	3	–	5	4	–	8
UCF	3	–	5	4	–	8
Marshall	3	–	5	4	–	8
West Division
Tulsa xy	7	–	1	11	–	3
Rice x	7	–	1	10	–	3
Houston	6	–	2	8	–	5
UTEP	4	–	4	5	–	7
Tulane	1	–	7	2	–	10
SMU	0	–	8	1	–	11
Championship: East Carolina 27, Tulsa 24
$ – Conference champion; x – Division champion/co-champions; y – Championship game participant; Rankings from AP Poll

The 2008 Rice Owls football team represented Rice University in the 2008 NCAA Division I FBS football season. The Owls played six home games at Rice Stadium in Houston, Texas The Owls finished the season with an overall record of 10–3 and a conference record of 7–1 in David Bailiff's second season.

== Personnel ==
=== Coaching staff ===
2008 Rice Owls coaching staff
Head coaches: Head Coach - David Bailiff; Offensive coaches: Tom Herman - Offensive coordinator/quarterbacks; Blake Miller - Running game coordinator/offensive line; Dan Hammerschmidt - Wide receivers; Rick LaFavers - Tight ends; Darrell Patterson - Running backs; Tom Keresztury - Offensive graduate assistant; Defensive coaches: Chuck Driesbach - Assistant head coach/co-defensive Coord.; Craig Naivar - Co-defensive coordinator/safeties; Darin Eliot - Defensive line; Jason Washington - Cornerbacks; Michael Slater - Graduate Assistant	Special teams: Special teams coordinator - Rick LaFavers; Administrative staff: Athletic Director (AD) - Chris DelConte; Yancy McKnight - Assistant AD/Performance Enhancement; Jerry Pickle - Assistant AD/Football Operations; Recruiting coordinator - Darin Eliot

== Regular season ==
=== Schedule ===
Date	Time	Opponent	Site	TV	Result	Attendance
August 29	7:00 pm	SMU	Rice Stadium; Houston, TX (Mayor's Cup)	ESPN	W 56–27	23,164
September 6	7:00 pm	at Memphis	Liberty Bowl; Memphis, TN	CBSCS	W 42–35	28,351
September 13	6:05 pm	at Vanderbilt*	Vanderbilt Stadium; Nashville, TN		L 21–38	37,370
September 20	2:30 pm	at No. 7 Texas*	Darrell K Royal–Texas Memorial Stadium; Austin, TX	FSN	L 10–52	97,201
September 27	4:30 pm	North Texas*	Rice Stadium; Houston, TX	KTXA	W 77–20	16,885
October 4	7:00 pm	at Tulsa	Chapman Stadium; Tulsa, OK	CBSCS	L 28–63	24,926
October 18	2:00 pm	Southern Miss	Rice Stadium; Houston, TX		W 45–40	11,117
October 25	2:05 pm	at Tulane	Louisiana Superdome; New Orleans, LA		W 42–17	17,841
November 1	8:05 pm	at UTEP	Sun Bowl Stadium; El Paso, TX		W 49–44	30,702
November 8	2:00 pm	Army*^{†}	Rice Stadium; Houston, TX		W 38–31	19,243
November 22	2:30 pm	Marshall	Rice Stadium; Houston, TX	CBSCS	W 35–10	15,131
November 28	2:30 pm	Houston	Rice Stadium; Houston, TX (rivalry)	CBSCS	W 56–42	35,534
December 30	7:05 pm	vs. Western Michigan*	Reliant Stadium; Houston, TX (Texas Bowl)	NFL Network	W 38–14	58,880
*Non-conference game; ^{†}Homecoming; Rankings from AP Poll released prior to the game; All times are in Central time

== Game summaries ==
=== SMU ===
	1	2	3	4	Total
Mustangs	13	0	7	7	27
Owls	14	14	28	0	56

The game kicked off Rice's 97th season of football. Rice began down 13–0, but two scores, both Chase Clement touchdown passes, within 52 seconds put the Owls up by one point to close the first quarter. Clement threw two touchdown passes in the second quarter as well, to Jarett Dillard (21 yards) and Corbin Smiter (12 yards), to take a 28–13 lead into halftime. After a Mustang touchdown pass, Rice exploded for four scores, two Clement passes, a James Casey run, and an interception returned 55 yards for a score by Andrew Sendejo. Logan Turner would throw a touchdown for SMU with 2:10 remaining in the contest.

Clement's six touchdown passes and Dillard's three receiving TDs both tied career highs in Rice's highest offensive output in a season opener in their history.

=== Memphis ===
	1	2	3	4	Total
Owls	3	0	10	29	42
Tigers	0	14	7	14	35

The Owls were behind the Tigers by fifteen, 35–20, with 8:33 to play. The comeback began when James Casey snared a 41-yard pass from Chase Clement, setting up a 5-yard hook-up with Jarett Dillard on the ensuing play, cutting the Memphis lead to 35–27 with 6:22 remaining. Rice began their comeback. After a quick stop, the Owls were looking to score again, taking over at their own six. Clement would sprint in from the nine four plays later. Casey would haul in the two-point conversion that knotted the game at 35–35.

Memphis would drive to the Rice 38, until the third-and-one slant was intercepted by Chris Jammer, who broke a tackle and scored with eleven seconds left, giving Rice the 42–35 win.

Dillard became the all-time leader in total points and touchdowns during the game, with Clement passing Tommy Kramer on the Rice all-time passing list. James Casey set career highs with 11 receptions and 208 yards, which passed David Houser for the Owl's single-game receiving yardage record.

=== Vanderbilt ===
	1	2	3	4	Total
Owls	14	7	0	0	21
Commodores	7	14	10	7	38

The Vanderbilt game marked the first time the Owls traveled to Nashville to play the Commodores, although the two programs had met three times before.

=== Texas ===
	1	2	3	4	Total
Owls	3	0	7	0	10
#7 Longhorns	7	17	14	14	52

Rice began the game with a Clark Fangmeier field goal, but it would be all Texas after that. Colt McCoy would run in a score before tossing two touchdowns to Jordan Shipley. Texas also added a field goal to their lead, making it 24–3. The lone Owls touchdown came in the third quarter, a Clement-to-Dillard hook-up of fifteen yards. McCoy would strike again, with a 46-yard completion to Chris Ogbonnaya for a score. Back-up Longhorn signal-caller John Chiles added a rushing touchdown, as did Cody Johnson, to put the final at 52–10.

Colt McCoy of Texas threw four touchdown passes, and led the Longhorns in rushing, as Texas rolled over Rice. McCoy also took the all-time passing touchdown record at Texas. Andrew Sendejo recorded 13+ tackles for the third consecutive game. His 17 stops against the Longhorns also fell one short of a career mark. Jarett Dillard had 158 yards receiving to lead the Owls. Clement also had his second career punt downed inside the twenty.

=== North Texas ===
	1	2	3	4	Total
Mean Green	13	7	0	0	20
Owls	21	35	21	0	77

Rice set a record for most points by a Rice team since 1916, when the Owls defeated SMU 146–3. Quarterback Chase Clement and receiver Jarett Dillard combined to set a record, becoming the most productive duo in NCAA history, eclipsing Tim Rattay and Troy Edwards at Louisiana Tech. Rice took advantage of North Texas mistakes, recovering three muffed punts, picking off three passes (two returned for touchdowns), and blocking a pair of kicks.

Rice opened the scoring with a 50-yard pass from Chase Clement to Toren Dixon. The Mean Green responded with a 71-yard drive capped with a one-yard score by Cam Montgomery, but the extra point was blocked. Clement came back with a touchdown pass to Jarett Dillard, giving the Owls a 14–6 lead. Rice would score another touchdown before the close of the first quarter, a 25-yard scamper by Clement. Cam Montgomery again scored in the first period for North Texas. Rice's Jeramy Goodson threw a touchdown pass to Dillard, and North Texas replied with a Giovanni Vizza passing touchdown to push the score to 28–20. Chase Clement then added a rushing touchdown, followed by a Marcus Knox rushing score to give the Owls a 22-point lead. Dillard and Clement hooked up for two scores within four minutes, giving the Owls a 56–20 lead and the two players a place in history.

After halftime, Clement would hit Patrick Randolph for a six-yard touchdown, and two North Texas interceptions would be returned for touchdowns by Rice, first by Arnaud Gascon-Nadon, then by Christopher Douglas. Neither team would score in the fourth quarter, leaving the Owls a 77–20 victory. Clark Fangmeier set a school record by converting eleven extra points in the contest.

=== Tulsa ===
	1	2	3	4	Total
Owls	7	7	7	7	28
Golden Hurricane	7	14	21	21	63

=== Southern Miss ===
	1	2	3	4	Total
Golden Eagles	6	6	7	21	40
Owls	7	10	14	14	45

=== Tulane ===
	1	2	3	4	Total
Owls	21	14	7	0	42
Green Wave	0	0	10	7	17

=== UTEP ===
	1	2	3	4	Total
Owls	14	14	7	14	49
Miners	17	3	10	14	44

=== Army, Homecoming ===
	1	2	3	4	Total
Black Knights	7	3	7	14	31
Owls	10	21	7	0	38

=== Marshall ===
	1	2	3	4	Total
Thundering Herd	0	7	3	0	10
Owls	7	0	14	14	35

=== Houston ===
	1	2	3	4	Total
Cougars	7	14	7	14	42
Owls	14	21	14	7	56

=== Western Michigan, Texas Bowl ===
	1	2	3	4	Total
Broncos	0	0	0	14	14
Owls	10	14	7	7	38
