= Joe Henderson (gridiron football) =

American gridiron football player (born 1986)

No. 48
- Position: Linebacker

Personal information
- Born: March 6, 1986 (age 40); Birmingham, Alabama, U.S.
- Listed height: 6 ft 2 in (1.88 m)
- Listed weight: 220 lb (100 kg)

Career information
- High school: John Carroll (Birmingham, Alabama)
- College: Alabama at Birmingham (2005–2009)
- NFL draft: 2010: undrafted

Career history
- 2010–2011: BC Lions
- 2012: Calgary Stampeders
- Stats at CFL.ca (archive)

Joe Henderson (born March 6, 1986) is a former professional American football linebacker. Henderson originally signed as a free agent with the BC Lions on April 22, 2010, and spent two seasons with the team. Following his release late in the 2011 season, he signed with the Stampeders on February 8, 2012. He played college football for the Alabama-Birmingham Blazers. He was released on June 18, 2012.
