= 2008 UCF Knights football team =

American college football season

2008 UCF Knights football
- Conference: Conference USA
- East
- Record: 4–8 (3–5 C-USA)
- Head coach: George O'Leary (5th season)
- Offensive coordinator: Tim Salem (5th season)
- Defensive coordinator: Dave Huxtable (1st as DC, 5th overall season)
- Home stadium: Bright House Networks Stadium (Capacity: 45,323)

2008 Conference USA football standings
	Conf.			Overall
Team	W		L	W		L
East Division
East Carolina x$	6	–	2	9	–	5
Memphis	4	–	4	6	–	7
Southern Miss	4	–	4	7	–	6
UAB	3	–	5	4	–	8
UCF	3	–	5	4	–	8
Marshall	3	–	5	4	–	8
West Division
Tulsa xy	7	–	1	11	–	3
Rice x	7	–	1	10	–	3
Houston	6	–	2	8	–	5
UTEP	4	–	4	5	–	7
Tulane	1	–	7	2	–	10
SMU	0	–	8	1	–	11
Championship: East Carolina 27, Tulsa 24
$ – Conference champion; x – Division champion/co-champions; y – Championship game participant; Rankings from AP Poll

The 2008 UCF Knights football team represented the University of Central Florida in the 2008 NCAA Division I FBS football season. Their head coach was George O'Leary, in his fifth season with the team. For the second season, the UCF Knights played all of their home games at Bright House Networks Stadium on the school's main campus in Orlando, Florida. The Knights sought unsuccessfully to defend their Conference USA football championship.

== Offseason ==
On August 22, 2008, wide receiver Richard Jackson announced that he had completed his enrollment at UCF, completing a transfer from the University of Notre Dame. Jackson was a star prospect from East Ridge High School in nearby Clermont, Florida. He received a hardship waiver from the NCAA on September 5, giving him immediate eligibility.

== Schedule ==
Date	Time	Opponent	Site	TV	Result	Attendance	Source
August 30	6:00 pm	South Carolina State*	Bright House Networks Stadium; Orlando, FL		W 17–0	42,126	
September 6	7:00 pm	No. 17 South Florida*	Bright House Networks Stadium; Orlando, FL (War on I–4)	ESPN2	L 24–31	46,805	
September 20	1:00 pm	at Boston College*	Alumni Stadium; Chestnut Hill, MA	ESPNU	L 7–34	41,267	
September 27	8:00 pm	at UTEP	Sun Bowl; El Paso, TX	CBSCS	L 13–58	33,339	
October 4	3:30 pm	SMU	Bright House Networks Stadium; Orlando, FL	CBSCS	W 31–17	43,147	
October 11	3:45 pm	at Miami (FL)*	Dolphin Stadium; Miami Gardens, FL	ESPNU	L 14–20	40,011	
October 26	8:00 pm	at No. 22 Tulsa	Skelly Field at H. A. Chapman Stadium; Tulsa, OK	ESPN	L 19–49	30,000	
November 2	8:15 pm	East Carolina	Bright House Networks Stadium; Orlando, FL	ESPN	L 10–13 ^{OT}	40,202	
November 8	3:30 pm	Southern Miss^{†}	Bright House Networks Stadium; Orlando, FL		L 6–17	41,652	
November 15	4:30 pm	at Marshall	Joan C. Edwards Stadium; Huntington, WV	CSS	W 30–14	24,059	
November 22	2:00 pm	at Memphis	Liberty Bowl Memorial Stadium; Memphis, TN		W 28–21	18,836	
November 29	1:00 pm	UAB	Bright House Networks Stadium; Orlando, FL		L 0–15	23,644	
*Non-conference game; ^{†}Homecoming; Rankings from AP Poll released prior to the game; All times are in Eastern time

== Game summaries ==
=== South Carolina State ===
	1	2	3	4	Total
Bulldogs	0	0	0	0	0
Knights	0	7	0	10	17

The Knights began their season at home against South Carolina State. Making his first start at quarterback, Michael Greco had a difficult time trying to find his groove, completing 9-of-16 passing for 90 yards, and running 13 times for 57 yards. But the defense remained strong and carried the team, holding the Bulldog offense to less than 22 minutes of play time, with Jason Venson catching an interception.

=== South Florida ===
	1	2	3	4	OT	Total
#17 Bulls	10	0	14	0	7	31
Knights	7	3	0	14	0	24

Greco's struggles continued when the Knights hosted South Florida for the last match in their "War on I-4" rivalry. While the Bulls scored first, Joe Burnett answered back with a 91-yard kickoff return for a touchdown. The Knights defense held as well as they could, holding the Bulls to 10 points in the first half and allowing the Knights to tie the game going into halftime. However, the Knights had difficulty maintaining their discipline, and it cost them in penalties. The Knights had 12 penalties for 148 yards, one of which negated a touchdown on an interception in the second quarter.

Although it appeared the Bulls would begin to run away with the game, scoring two touchdowns in the third quarter, Michael Greco finally awoke toward the end of the fourth quarter, leading two touchdown drives in the final minutes of regulation to force overtime. However, they came up short on a fourth-down run on their turn, failing to answer a quick South Florida touchdown.

Although sluggish for most of the game, the Knights offense did not turn the ball over. After their first two games, UCF has a +3 turnover ratio.

The unanticipated struggles for the Bulls dropped them back to their preseason #19 ranking in the AP poll despite the win.

=== Boston College ===
	1	2	3	4	Total
Knights	0	7	0	0	7
Eagles	0	3	14	17	34

=== UTEP ===
	1	2	3	4	Total
Knights	0	7	6	0	13
Miners	10	17	14	17	58

=== SMU ===
	1	2	3	4	Total
Mustangs	10	0	0	7	17
Knights	3	7	14	7	31

=== Miami (FL) ===
	1	2	3	4	Total
Knights	0	7	0	7	14
Hurricanes	10	0	0	10	20

=== Tulsa ===
	1	2	3	4	Total
Knights	0	19	0	0	19
Golden Hurricane	7	7	21	14	49

=== East Carolina ===
	1	2	3	4	OT	Total
Pirates	0	0	3	7	3	13
Knights	3	7	0	0	0	10

=== Southern Miss ===
	1	2	3	4	Total
Golden Eagles	0	7	7	3	17
Knights	6	0	0	0	6

=== Marshall ===
	1	2	3	4	Total
'Knights	10	10	3	7	30
Thundering Herd	0	7	7	0	14

=== Memphis ===
	1	2	3	4	Total
Knights	14	7	7	0	28
Tigers	7	0	7	7	21

=== UAB ===
	1	2	3	4	Total
Blazers	3	6	3	3	15
Knights	0	0	0	0	0
