= King Kaufman =

American sportswriter

King Kaufman is a sports journalist and former program manager at Bleacher Report and daily sports columnist for Salon.com.

== Biography ==
Kaufman grew up in Los Angeles, lived for six years in St. Louis, and moved back to San Francisco in the summer of 2007. In January 2011, King left Salon.

In addition to covering the major American sports leagues and international events such as the Olympics and the World Cup, Kaufman's columns often deal with issues related to the state of American sports. Some specific concerns of Kaufman include the role of race in sports and American culture, publicly financed stadiums, performance-enhancing substances, the inequalities and hypocrisy in the NCAA, and the poor quality of television sports announcing.

His articles feature light-hearted humor, typically with a degree of self-deprecation. A former Angeleno, he enjoys relating stories of his fond memories of the Dodger games he listened to as a child.

Annually, he tracks the performance of NFL prognosticators, himself included, along with his son Buster, the "coin-flippinest 4-year-old in North America", who flips coins to randomly predict the outcome of (presumably) closely contested games.

Kaufman has proposed changing the rules of nearly every organized sport, including removal of field goals from American football, the elimination of free throws from basketball, and the abolishment of offsides from soccer.

Kaufman is a frequent critic of sports announcers who use shoddy statistics or generally do not care about the sport which they are announcing. He has particular distaste for coverage of Major League Baseball on the Fox Network, including the playoffs, World Series and All-Star Game.

Kaufman, an admirer of sabermetrician Bill James, made his own contribution to baseball statistics by creating the Neifi Index. Named for infielder Neifi Pérez, this statistic measures a player's ability to contribute to his team's success by not playing. Introduced as an award that "we, the great whiffing, grounder-booting, sedentary lifestyle-leading masses, wouldn't just have a chance of winning if we were allowed to play. We'd be a lock", the Neifi Index is the difference between a player's team's winning percentage when he does not play and when he does play. It is called the Neifi Index because when Kaufman first computed it, the San Francisco Giants winning percentage when Pérez did not play was .929, but was only .542 when he did play, thus giving Neifi an index of .387.

Under the stage name the King Teen, Kaufman was the singer for the Smokejumpers, "purveyors of hampster-slappin' punk rockabilly in San Francisco from 1996-2000."

Kaufman was laid off by Bleacher Report in 2017, amid restructuring.
