= Chase Clement =

American gridiron football player (born 1986)

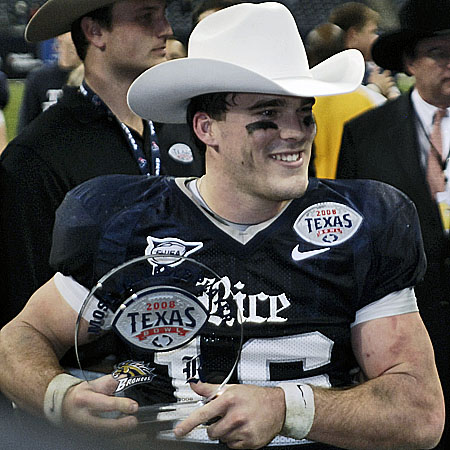
- Clement with Rice at the 2008 Texas Bowl

No. 16, 2
- Position: Quarterback

Personal information
- Born: June 11, 1986 (age 40); San Antonio, Texas, U.S.
- Listed height: 6 ft 1 in (1.85 m)
- Listed weight: 220 lb (100 kg)

Career information
- High school: Alamo Heights (TX)
- College: Rice (2004–2008)
- NFL draft: 2009: undrafted

Career history
- Hamilton Tiger-Cats (2009)*; Las Vegas Locomotives (2010–2012); Winnipeg Blue Bombers (2013)*
- * Offseason or practice squad member only

Awards and highlights
- UFL champion (2010); UFL championship game MVP (2010); Conference USA Most Valuable Player (2008); First-team All-Conference USA (2008); Second-team All-Conference USA (2007)

Chase Austin Clement (born June 11, 1986) is an American former professional football quarterback. Clement played college football for Rice University, where he finished his career ranked first in school history with 9,785 passing yards and 11,526 yards total offense. He played for the Las Vegas Locomotives of the United Football League (UFL), leading the team to a championship in 2010.

== College career ==
Clement and Rice wide receiver Jarett Dillard hold the NCAA Division I FBS record for career touchdowns between a quarterback-receiver tandem with 51. He also broke Conference USA passing records. He earned second-team All-Conference USA honors in 2007 after completing 59.1 percent of his passes for 3,377 yards with 29 touchdowns and 16 interceptions. Those numbers only improved in his first-team all-conference senior season: 66.5 percent for 4,119 yards, 44 touchdowns and seven interceptions. In his senior year, Clement earned the C-USA MVP honors and lead the Owls to their second bowl game in the last three years winning the 2008 Texas Bowl, he was named the MVP of the game. Clement finished his college career with 125 career touchdowns (99 pass, 25 rush and one receiving). He is in second place on the C-USA lists for career touchdowns and touchdown passes behind Case Keenum (178 and 155). Clement tied former Heisman Trophy winner Matt Leinart on the NCAA career touchdown pass list with 99.

=== Statistics ===
Season	Team	Games			Passing								Rushing			
Season	Team	GP	GS	Record	Cmp	Att	Pct	Yds	Y/A	TD	Int	Rtg	Att	Yds	Avg	TD
2004	Rice	0	0	—	Redshirted (redshirt)											
2005	Rice	11	1	0–1	53	124	42.7	582	4.7	5	6	85.8	65	32	0.5	1
2006	Rice	8	8	6–2	153	265	57.7	1,707	6.4	21	5	134.2	107	481	4.5	4
2007	Rice	12	12	3–9	300	508	59.1	3,377	6.6	29	16	127.4	144	535	3.7	8
2008	Rice	13	13	10–3	326	490	66.5	4,119	8.4	44	7	163.9	154	693	4.5	12
Career		44	34	19−15	832	1,387	60.0	9,785	7.1	99	34	137.9	470	1,741	3.7	25

== Professional career ==
Clement was a prospect for the 2009 NFL draft but he went undrafted.

He was signed by the Hamilton Tiger-Cats of the Canadian Football League (CFL) on June 2, 2009, but retired on June 6, after one preseason practice.

Clement was later signed by the Las Vegas Locomotives of the UFL. On November 6, Clement got his first action at quarterback. When the Locos were trailing the Sacramento Mountain Lions 21–0 at the half, head coach Jim Fassel benched starter Drew Willy and started Clement for the second half. Clement would lead a sensational comeback attempt, tying the game at 24 by leading the Locos to scores on his first four drives while scoring two rushing touchdowns. Sacramento would end up winning the game 27–24. Clement led the Locomotives to a 23–20 victory over the Florida Tuskers in the second UFL championship game, and won the game MVP award. Clement also led the Locomotives to the third UFL championship game, losing 17–3 to the Virginia Destroyers.

The Houston Texans worked out Clement on November 21, 2011 to help with the team's quarterback situation after season-ending injuries to Matt Schaub and Matt Leinart.

The Jacksonville Jaguars worked out Clement in early January 2012.

Clement worked out with the San Francisco 49ers on March 19, 2012.

The Winnipeg Blue Bombers of the CFL worked out Clement in March 2013. He signed with the team on April 8. Winnipeg released him during final roster cuts on June 22.

Clement worked out with the Dallas Cowboys on July 16, 2013.

== UFL career statistics ==
Legend
UFL championship game MVP
Won the UFL championship game

=== Regular season ===
Year	Team	Games			Passing								Rushing			
Year	Team	GP	GS	Record	Cmp	Att	Pct	Yds	Y/A	TD	Int	Rtg	Att	Yds	Avg	TD
2010	LV	2	1	0–1	17	35	48.6	212	6.1	1	3	41.6	9	84	9.3	2
2011	LV	4	4	3–1	74	119	62.2	778	6.5	1	1	80.4	18	87	4.8	2
2012	LV	4	4	4–0	32	55	58.2	658	12.0	4	2	109.5	10	11	1.1	0
Career		10	9	7–2	123	209	58.9	1,648	7.9	6	6	81.6	37	182	4.9	4

=== Postseason ===
Year	Team	Games			Passing								Rushing			
Year	Team	GP	GS	Record	Cmp	Att	Pct	Yds	Y/A	TD	Int	Rtg	Att	Yds	Avg	TD
2010	LV	1	1	1–0	16	25	64.0	237	9.5	2	1	104.9	5	30	6.0	0
2011	LV	1	1	0–1	7	26	26.9	93	3.6	0	3	2.4	0	0	0.0	0
Career		2	2	1–1	23	51	45.1	330	6.5	2	4	47.2	5	30	6.0	0
