= 2009 SMU Mustangs football team =

American college football season

2009 SMU Mustangs football

C-USA West Division co-champion Hawaii Bowl champion

Hawaii Bowl, W 45–10 vs. Nevada
- Conference: Conference USA
- West
- Record: 8–5 (6–2 C-USA)
- Head coach: June Jones (2nd season)
- Offensive coordinator: Dan Morrison (2nd season)
- Offensive scheme: Run and shoot
- Defensive coordinator: Tom Mason (2nd season)
- Base defense: 3–4
- Home stadium: Gerald J. Ford Stadium

Uniform

2009 Conference USA football standings
	Conf.			Overall
Team	W		L	W		L
East Division
East Carolina x$	7	–	1	9	–	5
UCF	6	–	2	8	–	5
Southern Miss	5	–	3	7	–	6
Marshall	4	–	4	7	–	6
UAB	4	–	4	5	–	7
Memphis	1	–	7	2	–	10
West Division
Houston xy	6	–	2	10	–	4
SMU x	6	–	2	8	–	5
Tulsa	3	–	5	5	–	7
UTEP	3	–	5	4	–	8
Rice	2	–	6	2	–	10
Tulane	1	–	7	3	–	9
Championship: East Carolina 38, Houston 32
$ – Conference champion; x – Division champion/co-champions; y – Championship game participant; Rankings from AP Poll

The 2009 SMU Mustangs football team represented Southern Methodist University in the 2009 NCAA Division I FBS football season. The Mustangs, led by second-year head coach June Jones, played their home games at Gerald J. Ford Stadium and competed in Conference USA.

The 2009 Mustangs played in a bowl game for the first time since the program's 1989 emergence from its 1987 shutdown due to massive NCAA rule violations. SMU was invited to the Hawaii Bowl, where they played Nevada. The Mustangs won, 45–10, to finish the season 8–5.

== Previous season ==
The 2008 team finished with an overall record of 1–11 with a conference record of 0–8, finishing in last place in the Conference USA West Division. The team's lone win was a 47–36 victory over FCS Texas State.

== Schedule ==
Date	Time	Opponent	Site	TV	Result	Attendance
September 5	7:00 p.m.	Stephen F. Austin*	Gerald J. Ford Stadium; University Park, TX		W 31–23	34,749
September 12	3:00 p.m.	at UAB	Legion Field; Birmingham, AL		W 35–33	18,082
September 19	4:00 p.m.	at Washington State*	Martin Stadium; Pullman, WA		L 27–30 ^{OT}	22,319
October 3	7:00 p.m.	at No. 11 TCU*	Amon G. Carter Stadium; Fort Worth, TX (Battle for the Iron Skillet)	The Mtn.	L 14–39	37,130
October 10	7:00 p.m.	East Carolina	Gerald J. Ford Stadium; University Park, TX		W 28–21	13,626
October 17	7:00 p.m.	Navy*	Gerald J. Ford Stadium; University Park, TX (Gansz Trophy)		L 35–38 ^{OT}	22,203
October 24	6:30 p.m.	at No. 17 Houston	Robertson Stadium; Houston, TX (rivalry)	CBSCS	L 15–38	26,889
October 31	1:00 p.m.	at Tulsa	Chapman Stadium; Tulsa, OK	CW33	W 27–13	21,714
November 7	2:00 p.m.	Rice^{†}	Gerald J. Ford Stadium; University Park, TX (Battle for the Mayor's Cup)		W 31–28	15,475
November 14	2:00 p.m.	UTEP	Gerald J. Ford Stadium; University Park, TX		W 35–31	21,697
November 21	3:30 p.m.	at Marshall	Joan C. Edwards Stadium; Huntington, WV		L 31–34	19,646
November 28	2:00 p.m.	Tulane	Gerald J. Ford Stadium; University Park, TX		W 26–21	20,335
December 24	7:00 p.m.	vs. Nevada*	Aloha Stadium; Halawa, HI (Hawaii Bowl)	ESPN	W 45–10	32,650
*Non-conference game; ^{†}Homecoming; Rankings from AP Poll released prior to the game; All times are in Central time

== Roster ==
2009 SMU Mustangs football team roster
Players
Coaches
Offense

Pos.	#	Name	Class
RB	8	Ryan Armstrong	So
OT	68	Chris Atchison	Fr
OT	70	Kelvin Beachum	So
WR	11	Cole Beasley	So
OL	75	Zach Boyd	So
WR	22	Josh Bryant	Jr
OL	51	Mitch Enright	Sr
G	77	Josh LeRibeus	So
RB	48	Zach Line	Fr
QB	15	J.J. McDermott	Jr
QB	9	Bo Levi Mitchell	So
QB	2	Kyle Padron	Fr
WR	24	Aldrick Robinson	Jr
WR	17	Emmanuel Sanders	Sr
QB	14	Braden Smith	Fr
WR	85	Ryan Walker	Fr
WR	18	Terrance Wilkerson	So
WR	5	Zach Zimmerman	Sr

Defense

Pos.	#	Name	Class
LB	59	Brendan Ahern	Fr
DB	22	Terry Andersen	Fr
DE	42	Jesse Andrew	Jr
DB	27	Jay Angotti	Jr
DB	23	Chris Banjo	So
DB	35	Tim Crosby	Jr
DB	4	Kellis Cunningham	Sr
LB	56	Ja'Gared Davis	So
DB	10	Rock Dennis	Sr
DL	95	Mickey Dollens	Jr
LB	52	Pete Fleps	Jr
LB	9	Chase Kennemer	Sr
DB	21	Robert Lloyd	Fr
CB	6	Bryan McCann	Sr
DB	2	Sterling Moore	Jr
DE	93	Chris Parham	Sr
DB	31	Bennie Thomas	Jr
DL	46	Zac Thomas	Jr
DE	47	Taylor Thompson	So
DE	81	Mario Walker	Sr
DB	3	Taylor Weaver	Fr
LB	45	Youri Yenga	Jr

Special teams

Pos.	#	Name	Class
K	4	Kellis Cunningham	Sr
LS	57	Keaton Palmer	Fr
P, K	6	Matt Szymanski	Jr
LS	53	Mark Voosen	Fr
K	13	Chase Wood	Fr

Head coach

- June Jones

Coordinators/assistant coaches

- Dan Morrison
  Offensive coordinator
- Tom Mason
  Defensive coordinator
- Dennis McKnight
  Special teams
- Joe Haering
  Linebackers
- Bert Hill
  Defensive line
- Adrian Klemm
  Offensive line
- Derek Odum
  Secondary
- Jeff Reinebold
  Wide receivers
- Wes Suan
  Running backs

Legend

- (C) Team captain
- (S) Suspended
- (I) Ineligible
- Injured
- Redshirt

Roster
Last update: April 15, 2018

== Game summaries ==
=== Stephen F. Austin ===
Stephen F. Austin Lumberjacks at SMU Mustangs – Game summary

Quarter	1	2	3	4	Total
Lumberjacks	7	3	13	0	23
Mustangs	7	7	0	17	31

at Gerald J. Ford Stadium, University Park, Texas

- Date: September 5
- Game time: 7:00 p.m. CDT
- Game attendance: 34,749
- Recap, Box score

Game information

First quarter

- SFA – Gralyn Crawford 2-yard pass from Jeremy Moses (Evan Engwall kick), 11:11. Lumberjacks 7–0. Drive: 2 plays, 5 yards, 0:38.
- SMU – Emmanuel Sanders 51-yard punt return (Matt Szymanski kick), 6:02. Tied 7–7.

Second quarter

- SFA – Evan Engwall 46-yard field goal, 4:42. Lumberjacks 10–7. Drive: 12 plays, 61 yards, 3:09.
- SMU – Darius Johnson 18-yard pass from Bo Levi Mitchell (Matt Szymanski kick), 2:45. Mustangs 14–10. Drive: 6 plays, 60 yards, 1:57.

Third quarter

- SFA – Evan Engwall 38-yard field goal, 11:45. Mustangs 14–13. Drive: 11 plays, 51 yards, 3:07.
- SFA – Evan Engwall 48-yard field goal, 1:09. Lumberjacks 16–14. Drive: 5 plays, 15 yards, 2:08.
- SFA – Aaron Rhea 5-yard pass from Jeremy Moses (Evan Engwall kick), 0:22. Lumberjacks 23–14. Drive: 3 plays, 5 yards, 0:16.

Fourth quarter

- SMU – Matt Szymanski 53-yard field goal, 14:01. Lumberjacks 23–17. Drive: 4 plays, 2 yards, 1:10.
- SMU – Bo Levi Mitchell 1-yard run (Matt Szymanski kick), 7:47. Mustangs 24–23. Drive: 11 plays, 71 yards, 5:35.
- SMU – Shawnbrey McNeal 49-yard run (Matt Szymanski kick), 1:31. Mustangs 31–23. Drive: 4 plays, 78 yards, 0:42.

Top passers

- SFA – Jeremy Moses – 31/52, 391 yards, 2 TD, 5 INT
- SMU – Bo Levi Mitchell – 23/45, 202 yards, TD, 2 INT

Top rushers

- SFA – Vincent Pervis – 15 rushes, 68 yards
- SMU – Shawnbrey McNeal – 19 rushes, 158 yards, TD

Top receivers

- SFA – Aaron Rhea – 8 receptions, 167 yards, TD
- SMU – Emmanuel Sanders – 8 receptions, 66 yards

=== At UAB ===
SMU Mustangs at UAB Blazers – Game summary

Quarter	1	2	3	4	Total
Mustangs	14	14	0	7	35
Blazers	0	7	20	6	33

at Legion Field, Birmingham, Alabama

- Date: September 12
- Game time: 3:00 p.m. CDT
- Game attendance: 18,082
- Recap, Box score

Game information

First quarter

- SMU – Braden Smith 7-yard run (Matt Szymanski kick), 10:10. Mustangs 7–0. Drive: 3 plays, 19 yards, 1:22.
- SMU – Bradley Haynes 4-yard pass from Bo Levi Mitchell (Matt Szymanski kick), 1:50. Mustangs 14–0. Drive: 5 plays, 63 yards, 2:23.

Second quarter

- UAB – Frantrell Forrest 18-yard pass from Joe Webb (Josh Zahn kick), 13:41. Mustangs 14–7. Drive: 8 plays, 77 yards, 3:03.
- SMU – Aldrick Robinson 32-yard pass from Bo Levi Mitchell (Matt Szymanski kick), 12:18. Mustangs 21–7. Drive: 4 plays, 60 yards, 1:23.
- SMU – Cole Beasley 6-yard pass from Bo Levi Mitchell (Matt Szymanski kick), 0:11. Mustangs 28–7. Drive: 2 plays, 30 yards, 0:32.

Third quarter

- UAB – Joe Webb 1-yard run (Josh Zahn kick), 9:14. Mustangs 28–14. Drive: 8 plays, 52 yards, 2:51.
- UAB – Mark Ferrell 80-yard run (Josh Zahn kick), 1:46. Mustangs 28–21. Drive: 1 play, 80 yards, 0:14.
- UAB – Andre Hicks 20-yard interception return (kick failed), 1:29. Mustangs 28–27.

Fourth quarter

- SMU – Shawnbrey McNeal 19-yard run (Matt Szymanski kick), 4:04. Mustangs 35–27. Drive: 9 plays, 54 yards, 5:07.
- UAB – Jeffery Anderson 14-yard pass from Joe Webb (run failed), 0:13. Mustangs 35–33. Drive: 8 plays, 60 yards, 1:27.

Top passers

- SMU – Bo Levi Mitchell – 28/47, 353 yards, 3 TD, 2 INT
- UAB – Joe Webb – 18/35, 226 yards, 2 TD, 4 INT

Top rushers

- SMU – Shawnbrey McNeal – 21 rushes, 67 yards, TD
- UAB – Joe Webb – 18 rushes, 97 yards, TD

Top receivers

- SMU – Emmanuel Sanders – 9 receptions, 148 yards, TD
- UAB – Frantrell Forrest – 3 receptions, 69 yards, TD

=== At Washington State ===
SMU Mustangs at Washington State Cougars – Game summary

Quarter	1	2	3	4	OT	Total
Mustangs	7	10	7	3	0	27
Cougars	0	7	6	14	3	30

at Martin Stadium, Pullman, Washington

- Date: September 19
- Game time: 4:00 p.m. CDT / 2:00 p.m. PDT
- Game attendance: 22,319
- Recap, Box score

Game information

First quarter

- SMU – Terrance Wilkinson 46-yard pass from Bo Levi Mitchell (Matt Szymanski kick), 7:10. Mustangs 7–0. Drive: 6 plays, 80 yards, 2:47.

Second quarter

- SMU – Matt Szymanski 29-yard field goal, 14:08. Mustangs 10–0. Drive: 9 plays, 47 yards, 3:37.
- SMU – Zach Line 4-yard run (Matt Szymanski kick), 8:23. Mustangs 17–0. Drive: 8 plays, 93 yards, 3:57.
- WSU – Daniel Blackledge 3-yard pass from Marshall Lobbestael (Nico Grasu kick), 0:30. Mustangs 17–7. Drive: 4 plays, 58 yards, 3:30.

Third quarter

- SMU – Terrance Wilkerson 23-yard pass from Bo Levi Mitchell (Matt Szymanski kick), 9:59. Mustangs 24–7. Drive: 5 plays, 45 yards, 2:31.
- WSU – Alex Hoffman-Ellis 52-yard interception return (pass failed), 1:16. Mustangs 24–13.

Fourth quarter

- SMU – Matt Szymanski 45-yard field goal, 10:47. Mustangs 27–13. Drive: 11 plays, 48 yards, 5:43.
- WSU – Myron Beck 67-yard interception return (Nico Grasu kick), 10:07. Mustangs 27–20.
- WSU – Jared Karstetter 7-yard pass from Marshall Lobbestael (Nico Grasu kick), 0:28. Tied 27–27. Drive: 11 plays, 80 yards, 1:35.

Overtime

- WSU – Nico Grasu 39-yard field goal. Cougars 30–27. Drive: 4 plays, 3 yards.

Top passers

- SMU – Bo Levi Mitchell – 40/57, 424 yards, 2 TD, 4 INT
- WSU – Marshall Lobbestael – 24/52, 239 yards, 2 TD, 2 INT

Top rushers

- SMU – Shawnbrey McNeal – 22 rushes, 83 yards
- WSU – Dwight Tardy – 8 rushes, 33 yards

Top receivers

- SMU – Emmanuel Sanders – 18 receptions, 178 yards
- WSU – Jared Karstetter – 5 receptions, 63 yards, TD

=== At No. 11 TCU ===
SMU Mustangs at No. 11 TCU Horned Frogs – Game summary

Quarter	1	2	3	4	Total
Mustangs	0	7	7	0	14
No. 11 Horned Frogs	0	12	13	14	39

at Amon G. Carter Stadium, Fort Worth, Texas

- Date: October 3
- Game time: 7:00 p.m. CDT
- Game attendance: 37,130
- TV announcers (The Mtn.): James Bates, Todd Christensen, Cash Sirois
- Recap, Box score

Game information

First quarter

- No scoring plays

Second quarter

- SMU – Shawnbrey McNeal 24-yard pass from Bo Levi Mitchell (Matt Szymanski kick), 14:37. Mustangs 7–0. Drive: 7 plays, 75 yards, 2:29.
- TCU – Antoine Hicks 2-yard run (kick blocked), 10:41. Mustangs 7–6. Drive: 9 plays, 43 yards, 3:56.
- TCU – Jeremy Kerley 71-yard punt return (pass failed), 5:00. Horned Frogs 12–7.

Third quarter

- TCU – Matthew Tucker 11-yard run (pass failed), 10:45. Horned Frogs 18–7. Drive: 8 plays, 81 yards, 4:15.
- TCU – Joseph Turner 1-yard run (Ross Evans kick), 3:00. Horned Frogs 25–7. Drive: 4 plays, 21 yards, 1:38.
- SMU – Emmanuel Sanders 4-yard pass from Bo Levi Mitchell (Matt Szymanski kick), 0:34. Horned Frogs 25–14. Drive: 7 plays, 62 yards, 2:26.

Fourth quarter

- TCU – Antoine Hicks 28-yard pass from Andy Dalton (Ross Evans kick), 13:15. Horned Frogs 32–14. Drive: 6 plays, 40 yards, 2:19.
- TCU – Luke Shivers 1-yard pass from Andy Dalton (Ross Evans kick), 8:21. Horned Frogs 39–14. Drive: 8 plays, 55 yards, 4:24.

Top passers

- SMU – Bo Levi Mitchell – 17/38, 240 yards, 2 TD, 2 INT
- TCU – Andy Dalton – 12/20, 189 yards, 2 TD, INT

Top rushers

- SMU – Shawnbrey McNeal – 13 rushes, 26 yards
- TCU – Joseph Turner – 19 rushes, 79 yards, TD

Top receivers

- SMU – Emmanuel Sanders – 8 receptions, 74 yards, TD
- TCU – Jeremy Kerley – 4 receptions, 48 yards

=== East Carolina ===
East Carolina Pirates at SMU Mustangs – Game summary

Quarter	1	2	3	4	Total
Pirates	0	7	7	7	21
Mustangs	0	7	14	7	28

at Gerald J. Ford Stadium, University Park, Texas

- Date: October 10
- Game time: 7:00 p.m. CDT
- Game attendance: 13,626
- TV announcers (ISP Sports/MASN): CJ Martin, Bruce Wiseman, Dave Michaels
- Recap, Box score

Game information

First quarter

- No scoring plays

Second quarter

- ECU – Dwayne Harris 10-yard run (Ben Ryan kick), 10:26. Pirates 7–0. Drive: 10 plays, 65 yards, 4:27.
- SMU – Bryan McCann 63-yard kick return (Matt Szymanski kick), 3:52. Tied 7–7.

Third quarter

- SMU – Aldrick Robinson 96-yard pass from Bo Levi Mitchell (Matt Szymanski kick), 11:07. Mustangs 14–7. Drive: 1 play, 96 yards, 0:14.
- SMU – Rock Dennis 53-yard interception return (Matt Szymanski kick), 8:12. Mustangs 21–7.
- ECU – Giavanni Ruffin 2-yard run (Ben Ryan kick), 1:39. Mustangs 21–14. Drive: 14 plays, 78 yards, 6:27.

Fourth quarter

- SMU – Terrance Wilkerson 17-yard pass from Bo Levi Mitchell (Matt Szymanski kick), 5:02. Mustangs 28–14. Drive: 10 plays, 53 yards, 5:43.
- ECU – Dwayne Harris 77-yard kickoff return (Ben Ryan kick), 4:42. Mustangs 28–21.

Top passers

- ECU – Patrick Pinkey – 20/34, 181 yards, INT
- SMU – Bo Levi Mitchell – 17/29, 266 yards, 2 TD

Top rushers

- ECU – Dominique Lindsay – 24 rushes, 144 yards
- SMU – Shawnbrey McNeal – 15 rushes, 34 yards

Top receivers

- ECU – Jamar Bryant – 5 receptions, 58 yards
- SMU – Aldrick Robinson – 4 receptions, 125 yards, TD

=== Navy ===
Navy Midshipmen at SMU Mustangs – Game summary

Quarter	1	2	3	4	OT	Total
Midshipmen	7	0	14	14	3	38
Mustangs	7	14	7	7	0	35

at Gerald J. Ford Stadium, University Park, Texas

- Date: October 17
- Game time: 7:00 p.m. CDT
- Game attendance: 22,203
- Recap, Recap

Game information

First quarter

- NAVY – Marcus Curry 31-yard run (Joe Buckley kick), 10:57. Midshipmen 7–0. Drive: 6 plays, 51 yards, 3:06.
- SMU – Zach Line 3-yard run (Matt Szymanski kick), 5:32. Tied 7–7. Drive: 10 plays, 79 yards, 5:25.

Second quarter

- SMU – Zach Line 6-yard run (Matt Szymanski kick), 8:39. Mustangs 14–7. Drive: 5 plays, 50 yards, 2:02.
- SMU – Sterling Moore 1-yard fumble return (Matt Szymanski kick), 8:23. Mustangs 21–7.

Third quarter

- NAVY – Vince Murray 3-yard run (Joe Buckley kick), 9:53. Mustangs 21–14. Drive: 5 plays, 75 yards, 1:55.
- NAVY – Ricky Dobbs 12-yard run (Joe Buckley kick), 4:17. Tied 21–21. Drive: 10 plays, 70 yards, 3:55.
- SMU – Terrance Wilkerson 6-yard pass from Bo Levi Mitchell (Matt Szymanski kick), 0:00. Mustangs 28–21. Drive: 8 plays, 75 yards, 4:10.

Fourth quarter

- NAVY – Vince Murray 7-yard run (Joe Buckley kick), 12:12. Tied 28–28. Drive: 5 plays, 86 yards, 2:48.
- NAVY – Ricky Dobbs 5-yard run (Joe Buckley kick), 9:11. Midshipmen 35–28. Drive: 5 plays, 42 yards, 2:25.
- SMU – Aldrick Robinson 10-yard pass form Bo Levi Mitchell (Matt Szymanski kick), 1:35. Tied 35–35. Drive: 15 plays, 84 yards, 7:36.

Overtime

- NAVY – Joe Buckley 24-yard field goal. Midshipmen 38–35. Drive: 8 plays, 12 yards.

Top passers

- NAVY – Ricky Dobbs – 4/9, 68 yards
- SMU – Bo Levi Mitchell – 19/41, 200 yards, 2 TD

Top rushers

- NAVY – Vince Murray – 25 rushes, 141 yards, 2 TD
- SMU – Shawnbrey McNeal – 15 rushes, 131 yards

Top receivers

- NAVY – Greg Jones – 1 reception, 39 yards
- SMU – Aldrick Robinson – 4 receptions, 62 yards, TD

=== At No. 17 Houston ===
SMU Mustangs at No. 17 Houston Cougars – Game summary

Quarter	1	2	3	4	Total
Mustangs	0	3	0	12	15
No. 17 Cougars	14	10	7	7	38

at Robertson Stadium, Houston, Texas

- Date: October 24
- Game time: 6:30 p.m. CDT
- Game attendance: 26,889
- TV announcers (CBSSN): Dave Ryan, Akbar Gbaja-Biamila
- Recap, Box score

Game information

First quarter

- HOU – Charles Sims 20-yard run (Matt Hogan kick), 8:10. Cougars 7–0. Drive: 6 plays, 55 yards, 1:38.
- HOU – Bryce Beall 1-yard run (Matt Hogan kick), 1:58. Cougars 14–0. Drive: 1 play, 1 yard, 0:05.

Second quarter

- HOU – Matt Hogan 22-yard field goal, 12:44. Cougars 17–0. Drive: 7 plays, 58 yards, 1:58.
- SMU – Matt Szymanski 26-yard field goal, 8:05. Cougars 17–3. Drive: 10 plays, 68 yards, 4:39.
- HOU – Patrick Edwards 7-yard pass from Case Keenum (Matt Hogan kick), 5:14. Cougars 24–3. Drive: 8 plays, 68 yards, 2:51.

Third quarter

- HOU – Tyron Carrier 92-yard kickoff return (Matt Hogan kick), 14:47. Cougars 31–3.

Fourth quarter

- SMU – Shawnbrey McNeal 4-yard run (kick failed), 14:21. Cougars 31–9. Drive: 6 plays, 79 yards, 2:42.
- SMU – Aldrick Robinson 37-yard pass from Kyle Padron (pass failed), 9:48. Cougars 31–15. Drive: 5 plays, 60 yards, 2:38.
- HOU – Charles Sims 6-yard run (Matt Hogan kick), 5:44. Cougars 38–15. Drive: 11 plays, 75 yards, 4:04.

Top passers

- SMU – Kyle Padron – 11/16, 141 yards, TD
- HOU – Case Keenum – 25/36, 233 yards, TD

Top rushers

- SMU – Shawnbrey McNeal – 15 rushes, 95 yards, TD
- HOU – Charles Sims – 15 rushes, 105 yards, 2 TD

Top receivers

- SMU – Emmanuel Sanders – 6 receptions, 47 yards
- HOU – Patrick Edwards – 9 receptions, 122 yards, TD

=== At Tulsa ===
SMU Mustangs at Tulsa Golden Hurricane – Game summary

Quarter	1	2	3	4	Total
Mustangs	0	7	10	10	27
Golden Hurricane	0	7	0	6	13

at Chapman Stadium, Tulsa, Oklahoma

- Date: October 31
- Game time: 1:00 p.m. CDT
- Game attendance: 21,714
- TV announcers (CW33): Brad Sham, Allan Stone
- Recap, Box score

Game information

First quarter

- No scoring plays

Second quarter

- TLSA – Charles Opeseyitan 13-yard run (Kevin Fitzpatrick kick), 9:01. Golden Hurricane 7–0. Drive: 7 plays, 76 yards, 2:09.
- SMU – Cole Beasley 49-yard pass from Kyle Padron (Matt Szymanski kick), 4:22. Tied 7–7. Drive: 3 plays, 57 yards, 1:36.

Third quarter

- SMU – Shawnbrey McNeal 36-yard pass from Kyle Padron (Matt Szymanski kick), 8:58. Mustangs 14–7. Drive: 8 plays, 98 yards, 4:29.
- SMU – Matt Szymanski 35-yard field goal, 3:20. Mustangs 17–7. Drive: 7 plays, 4 yards, 4:48.

Fourth quarter

- SMU – Matt Szymanski 31-yard field goal, 14:57. Mustangs 20–7. Drive: 6 plays, 67 yards, 1:44.
- TLSA – Jacob Collums 13-yard pass from Jacob Bower (kick failed), 12:30. Mustangs 20–13. Drive: 6 plays, 80 yards, 2:27.
- SMU – Zach Line 2-yard run (Matt Szymanski kick), 1:57. Mustangs 27–13. Drive: 7 plays, 56 yards, 3:34.

Top passers

- SMU – Kyle Padron – 20/30, 354 yards, 2 TD
- TLSA – Jacob Bower – 9/22, 206 yards, TD

Top rushers

- SMU – Shawnbrey McNeal – 19 rushes, 44 yards
- TLSA – Jamad Williams – 10 rushes, 46 yards

Top receivers

- SMU – Aldrick Robinson – 5 receptions, 104 yards
- TLSA – Damaris Johnson – 4 receptions, 121 yards

=== Rice ===
Rice Owls at SMU Mustangs – Game summary

Quarter	1	2	3	4	Total
Owls	13	7	0	8	28
Mustangs	7	14	3	7	31

at Gerald J. Ford Stadium, University Park, Texas

- Date: November 7
- Game time: 2:00 p.m. CST
- Game attendance: 15,475
- TV announcers (TimeWarner-MetroSports): CJ Martin, Bruce Wiseman
- Recap, Box score

Game information

First quarter

- SMU – Shawnbrey McNeal 7-yard run (Matt Szymanski kick), 8:56. Mustangs 7–0. Drive: 10 plays, 80 yards, 6:04.
- RICE – Patrick Randolph 11-yard pass from Nick Fanuzzi (Clark Fangmeier kick), 2:39. Tied 7–7. Drive: 13 plays, 80 yards, 4:46.
- RICE – Patrick Randolph 33-yard pass from Nick Fanuzzi (kick blocked), 1:24. Owls 13–7. Drive: 2 plays, 33 yards, 0:14.

Second quarter

- RICE – Charles Ross 1-yard run (Clark Fangmeier kick), 5:23. Owls 20–7. Drive: 12 plays, 80 yards, 5:30.
- SMU – Emmanuel Sanders 23-yard pass from Kyle Padron (Matt Szymanski kick), 1:41. Owls 20–14. Drive: 7 plays, 78 yards, 3:36.
- SMU – Bryan McCann 74-yard kick return (Matt Szymanski kick), 0:00. Mustangs 21–20.

Third quarter

- SMU – Matt Szymanski 23-yard field goal, 4:27. Mustangs 24–20. Drive: 12 plays, 73 yards, 6:04.

Fourth quarter

- SMU – Shawnbrey McNeal 9-yard run (Matt Szymanski kick), 10:12. Mustangs 31–20. Drive: 5 plays, 24 yards, 3:09.
- RICE – Toren Dixon 4-yard pass from Nick Fanuzzi (Nick Fanuzzi pass to Taylor Wardlow), 1:47. Mustangs 31–28. Drive: 15 plays, 69 yards, 5:34.

Top passers

- RICE – Nick Fanuzzi – 29/42, 250 yards, 3 TD
- SMU – Kyle Padron – 17/24, 234 yards, TD, INT

Top rushers

- RICE – Charles Ross – 12 rushes, 50 yards, TD
- SMU – Shawnbrey McNeal – 21 rushes, 88 yards, TD

Top receivers

- RICE – Patrick Randolph – 8 receptions, 93 yards, 2 TD
- SMU – Emmanuel Sanders – 6 receptions, 136 yards, TD

=== UTEP ===
UTEP Miners at SMU Mustangs – Game summary

Quarter	1	2	3	4	Total
Miners	7	3	14	7	31
Mustangs	7	14	0	14	35

at Gerald J. Ford Stadium, University Park, Texas

- Date: November 14
- Game time: 2:00 p.m. CST
- Game attendance: 21,697
- TV announcers (TimeWarner-MetroSports): CJ Martin, Bruce Wiseman
- Recap, Box score

Game information

First quarter

- SMU – Emmanuel Sanders 35-yard pass from Kyle Padron (Matt Szymanski kick), 13:30. Mustangs 7–0. Drive: 3 plays, 49 yards, 1:30.
- UTEP – Donald Buckram 14-yard run (Logan Barrett kick), 2:58. Tied 7–7. Drive: 6 plays, 88 yards, 2:37.

Second quarter

- SMU – Shawnbrey McNeal 58-yard run (Matt Szymanski kick), 13:58. Mustangs 14–7. Drive: 2 plays, 85 yards, 0:44.
- SMU – Kyle Padron 1-yard run (Matt Szymanski kick), 7:49. Mustangs 21–7. Drive: 8 plays, 60 yards, 4:14.
- UTEP – Logan Barrett 33-yard field goal, 1:33. Mustangs 21–10. Drive: 14 plays, 64 yards, 6:16.

Third quarter

- UTEP – Jason Williams 1-yard run (Logan Barrett kick), 9:59. Mustangs 21–17. Drive: 10 plays, 70 yards, 5:01.
- UTEP – Jeff Moturi 22-yard pass from Trevor Vittatoe (Logan Barrett kick), 4:34. Miners 24–21. Drive: 7 plays, 99 yards, 2:32.

Fourth quarter

- SMU – Kyle Padron 1-yard run (Matt Szymanski kick), 12:55. Mustangs 28–24. Drive: 13 plays, 80 yards, 6:39.
- UTEP – Donald Buckram 30-yard pass from Trevor Vittatoe (Logan Barrett kick), 8:57. Miners 31–28. Drive: 7 plays, 80 yards, 3:58.
- SMU – Emmanuel Sanders 37-yard pass from Kyle Padron (Matt Szymanski kick), 4:34. Mustangs 35–31. Drive: 5 plays, 66 yards, 2:14.

Top passers

- UTEP – Trevor Vittatoe – 23/40, 396 yards, 2 TD, INT
- SMU – Kyle Padron – 17/24, 244 yards, 2 TD, 2 INT

Top rushers

- UTEP – Donald Buckram – 33 rushes, 241 yards, TD
- SMU – Shawnbrey McNeal – 18 rushes, 169 yards, TD

Top receivers

- UTEP – Jeff Moturi – 5 receptions, 153 yards, TD
- SMU – Emmanuel Sanders – 7 receptions, 134 yards, 2 TD

=== At Marshall ===
SMU Mustangs at Marshall Thundering Herd – Game summary

Quarter	1	2	3	4	Total
Mustangs	7	3	7	14	31
Thundering Herd	7	3	14	10	34

at Joan C. Edwards Stadium, Huntington, West Virginia

- Date: November 21
- Game time: 3:30 p.m. CST / 4:30 p.m. EST
- Game attendance: 19,646
- Recap, Box score

Game information

First quarter

- SMU – Shawnbrey McNeal 1-yard run (Matt Szymanski kick), 9:36. Mustangs 7–0. Drive: 4 plays, 54 yards, 1:26.
- MRSH – Martin Ward 2-yard run (Craig Ratananmorn kick), 3:27. Tied 7–7. Drive: 11 plays, 92 yards, 6:09.

Second quarter

- MRSH – Craig Ratanmorn 50-yard field goal, 13:26. Thundering Herd 10–7. Drive: 7 plays, 31 yards, 3:57.
- SMU – Matt Szymanski 25-yard field goal, 7:47. Tied 10–10. Drive: 11 plays, 70 yards, 5:39.

Third quarter

- MRSH – Terrell Edwards-Maye 8-yard run (Craig Ratanmorn kick), 10:14. Thundering Herd 17–10. Drive: 10 plays, 75 yards, 4:46.
- SMU – Emmanuel Sanders 43-yard pass from Kyle Padron (Matt Szymanski kick), 8:41. Tied 17–17. Drive: 6 plays, 64 yards, 1:33.
- MRSH – Aaron Dobson 40-yard pass from Brian Anderson (Craig Ratanmorn kick), 5:42. Thundering Herd 24–17. Drive: 7 plays, 87 yards, 2:59.

Fourth quarter

- MRSH – Craig Ratanmorn 42-yard field goal, 8:55. Thundering Herd 27–17. Drive: 7 plays, 53 yards, 2:28.
- SMU – Aldrick Robinson 12-yard pass from Kyle Padron (Matt Szymanski kick), 5:33. Thundering Herd 27–24. Drive: 7 plays, 60 yards, 3:22.
- MRSH – Aaron Dobson 16-yard pass from Brian Anderson (Brian Ratanmorn kick), 2:01. Thundering Herd 34–24. Drive: 4 plays, 27 yards, 0:42.
- SMU – Zach Line 9-yard run (Matt Szymanski kick), 0:40. Thundering Herd 34–31. Drive: 8 plays, 64 yards, 1:21.

Top passers

- SMU – Kyle Padron – 18/32, 225 yards, 2 TD, INT
- MRSH – Brian Anderson – 13/22, 213 yards, 2 TD

Top rushers

- SMU – Shawnbrey McNeal – 20 rushes, 82 yards, TD
- MRSH – Martin Ward – 25 rushes, 136 yards, TD

Top receivers

- SMU – Emmanuel Sanders – 8 receptions, 94 yards, TD
- MRSH – Aaron Dobson – 4 receptions, 127 yards, 2 TD

=== Tulane ===
Tulane Green Wave at SMU Mustangs – Game summary

Quarter	1	2	3	4	Total
Green Wave	7	0	7	7	21
Mustangs	7	10	3	6	26

at Gerald J. Ford Stadium, University Park, Texas

- Date: November 28
- Game time: 2:00 p.m. CST
- Game attendance: 20,335
- TV announcers (TimeWarner-MetroSports): CJ Martin, Bruce Wiseman
- Recap, Box score

Game information

First quarter

- SMU – Shawnbrey McNeal 2-yard run (Matt Szymanski kick), 9:04. Mustangs 7–0. Drive: 1 plays, 80 yards, 5:56.
- TULN – Jeremy Williams 5-yard pass from Ryan Griffin (Ross Thevenot kick), 2:07. Tied 7–7. Drive: 13 plays, 68 yards, 6:52.

Second quarter

- SMU – Matt Szymanski 31-yard field goal, 12:54. Mustangs 10–7. Drive: 10 plays, 42 yards, 4:13.
- SMU – Zach Line 3-yard run (Matt Szymanski kick), 2:57. Mustangs 17–7. Drive: 4 plays, 86 yards, 1:37.

Third quarter

- TULN – Jeremy Williams 46-yard pass from Ryan Griffin (Ross Thevenot kick), 14:13. Mustangs 17–14. Drive: 2 plays, 52 yards, 0:47.
- SMU – Matt Szymanski 37-yard field goal, 2:55. Mustangs 20–14. Drive: 11 plays, 61 yards, 4:52.

Fourth quarter

- TULN – Andre Anderson 1-yard run (Ross Thevenot kick), 10:06. Green Wave 21–20. Drive; 8 plays, 59 yards, 4:04.
- SMU – Shawnbrey McNeal 4-yard run (pass failed), 5:23. Mustangs 26–20. Drive: 9 plays, 68 yards, 4:43.

Top passers

- TULN – Ryan Griffin – 18/26, 216 yards, 2 TD
- SMU – Kyle Padron – 20/34, 264 yards

Top rushers

- TULN – Andre Anderson – 27 rushes, 105 yards, TD
- SMU – Shawnbrey McNeal – 26 rushes, 147 yards, 2 TD

Top receivers

- TULN – Jeremy Williams – 5 receptions, 74 yards, 2 TD
- SMU – Emmanuel Sanders – 6 receptions, 144 yards

=== Vs. Nevada (Hawaii Bowl) ===
Nevada Wolf Pack vs. SMU Mustangs (Hawaii Bowl) – Game summary

Quarter	1	2	3	4	Total
Wolf Pack	0	0	3	7	10
Mustangs	17	14	7	7	45

at Aloha Stadium, Halawa, Hawaii

- Date: December 24
- Game time: 7:00 p.m. CST / 2:00 p.m. HST
- Game attendance: 32,650
- Referee: Land Clark
- TV announcers (ESPN/ESPN Radio): Terry Gannon and David Norrie
- Recap

Game information

First quarter

- SMU – Shawnbrey McNeal 9-yard run (Matt Szymanski kick), 13:29. Mustangs 7–0. Drive: 3 plays, 79 yards, 1:31.
- SMU – Shawnbrey McNeal 1-yard run (Matt Szymanski kick), 8:22. Mustangs 14–0. Drive: 2 plays, 61 yards, 1:05.
- SMU – Matt Szymanski 22-yard field goal, 2:49. Mustangs 17–0. Drive: 9 plays, 39 yards, 4:09.

Second quarter

- SMU – Emmanuel Sanders 17-yard pass from Kyle Padron (Matt Szymanski kick), 5:37. Mustangs 24–0. Drive: 10 plays, 75 yards, 4:44.
- SMU – Cole Beasley 2-yard pass from Kyle Padron (Matt Szymanski kick), 1:17. Mustangs 31–0. Drive: 10 plays, 60 yards, 2:52.

Third quarter

- SMU – Zach Line 3-yard run (Matt Szymanski kick), 7:45. Mustangs 38–0. Drive: 9 plays, 90 yards, 5:19.
- NEV – Richard Drake 21-yard field goal, 3:08. Mustangs 38–3. Drive: 11 plays, 70 yards, 4:37.

Fourth quarter

- SMU – Shawnbrey McNeal 17-yard run (Matt Szymanski kick), 3:27. Mustangs 45–3. Drive: 8 plays, 89 yards, 5:29.
- NEV – Brandon Wimberly 10-yard pass from Colin Kaepernick (Richard Drake kick), 1:04. Mustangs 45–10. Drive: 8 plays, 60 yards, 2:23.

Top passers

- NEV – Colin Kaepernick – 15/29, 177 yards, TD, INT
- SMU – Kyle Padron – 32/41, 460 yards, 2 TD

Top rushers

- NEV – Lampford Mark – 15 rushes, 90 yards
- SMU – Shawnbrey McNeal – 12 rushes, 63 yards, 3 TD

Top receivers

- NEV – Brandon Wimberly – 7 receptions, 80 yards, TD
- SMU – Aldrick Robinson – 9 receptions, 176 yards

== Team players drafted into the NFL ==
Player	Position	Round	Pick	NFL club
Emmanuel Sanders	Wide receiver	3	82	Pittsburgh Steelers
