= 2009 Nevada Wolf Pack football team =

American college football season

2009 Nevada Wolf Pack football

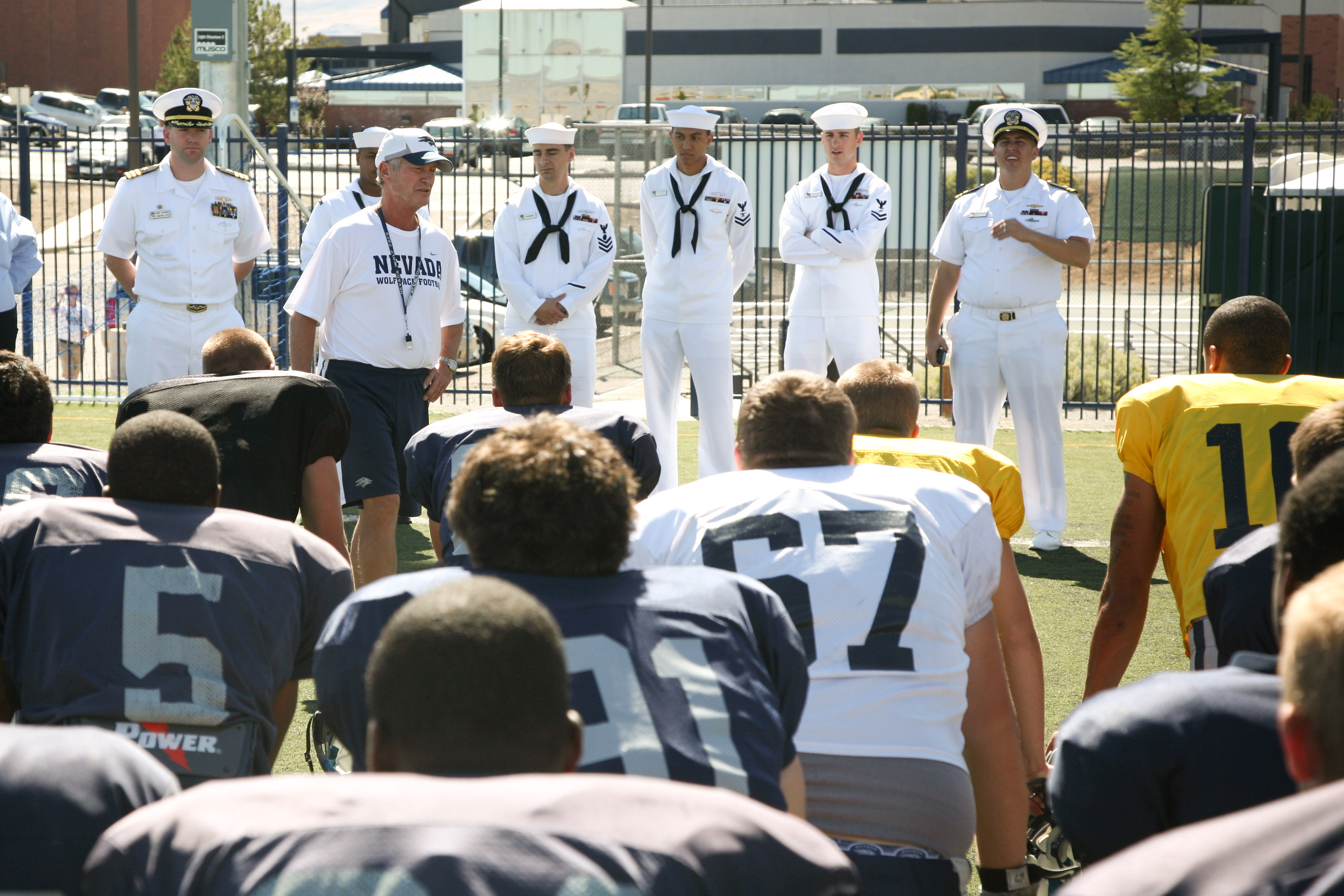
- Head coach Chris Ault introduces football players with Commander Marc Behning, left, commanding officer of the Ohio–class fleet ballistic–missile submarine USS Nevada (SSBN-733) at the University of Nevada, Reno on September 16, 2009

Hawaii Bowl, L 10–45 vs. SMU
- Conference: Western Athletic Conference
- Record: 8–5 (7–1 WAC)
- Head coach: Chris Ault (25th season)
- Offensive coordinator: Chris Klenakis (9th season)
- Offensive scheme: Pistol
- Defensive coordinator: Nigel Burton (2nd season)
- Base defense: 3–4
- Home stadium: Mackay Stadium

2009 Western Athletic Conference football standings
	Conf.			Overall
Team	W		L	W		L
No. 4 Boise State $%	8	–	0	14	–	0
Nevada	7	–	1	8	–	5
Fresno State	6	–	2	8	–	5
Idaho	4	–	4	8	–	5
Hawaii	3	–	5	6	–	7
Louisiana Tech	3	–	5	4	–	8
Utah State	3	–	5	4	–	8
New Mexico State	1	–	7	3	–	10
San Jose State	1	–	7	2	–	10
% – BCS at-large representative; $ – Conference champion; Rankings from AP Poll

The 2009 Nevada Wolf Pack football team represented the University of Nevada, Reno in the 2009 NCAA Division I FBS football season. Nevada competed as a member of the Western Athletic Conference (WAC). The Wolf Pack were led by Chris Ault in his 25th overall and 6th straight season since taking over as head coach for the third time in 2004. They played their home games at Mackay Stadium. The Wolf Pack finished the regular season 8–4 and 7–1 in the WAC, good enough for second place in the conference behind Boise State. They lost to SMU in the Hawaii Bowl.

== Schedule ==
Date	Time	Opponent	Site	TV	Result	Attendance	Source
September 5	12:30 p.m.	at No. 23 Notre Dame*	Notre Dame Stadium; Notre Dame, IN	NBC	L 0–35	80,795	
September 19	2:00 p.m.	at Colorado State*	Hughes Stadium; Fort Collins, CO		L 20–35	24,967	
September 25	6:00 p.m.	Missouri*	Mackay Stadium; Reno, NV	ESPN	L 21–31	18,269	
October 3	1:00 p.m.	UNLV*	Mackay Stadium; Reno, NV (Fremont Cannon)		W 63–28	24,078	
October 9	6:00 p.m.	Louisiana Tech	Mackay Stadium; Reno, NV	ESPN	W 37–14	11,975	
October 17	12:00 p.m.	at Utah State	Romney Stadium; Logan, UT	KAME-TV/CSNCA/XXL Sports/Cis–Com	W 35–32	15,103	
October 24	1:00 p.m.	Idaho^{†}	Mackay Stadium; Reno, NV		W 70–45	16,611	
October 31	1:00 p.m.	Hawaii	Mackay Stadium; Reno, NV	Oceanic PPV	W 31–21	14,735	
November 8	5:30 p.m.	at San Jose State	Spartan Stadium; San Jose, CA	ESPN	W 62–7	11,103	
November 14	1:00 p.m.	Fresno State	Mackay Stadium; Reno, NV	CSNCA/ESPNGP	W 52–14	19,331	
November 21	7:30 p.m.	at New Mexico State	Aggie Memorial Stadium; Las Cruces, NM	ESPNU	W 63–20	11,775	
November 27	7:00 p.m.	at No. 6 Boise State	Bronco Stadium; Boise, ID (rivalry)	ESPN2	L 33–44	32,642	
December 24	5:00 p.m.	vs. SMU*	Aloha Stadium; Halawa, HI (Hawaii Bowl)	ESPN	L 10–45	32,650	
*Non-conference game; ^{†}Homecoming; Rankings from AP Poll released prior to the game; All times are in Pacific time

== Game summaries ==
=== At Notre Dame ===
Nevada at Notre Dame

Team	1	2	3	4	Total
Wolf Pack	0	0	0	0	0
• No. 23 Fighting Irish	7	21	7	0	35

- Date: September 5, 2009
- Location: Notre Dame Stadium
  Notre Dame, IN
- Game start: 3:42 p.m. EDT
- Elapsed time: 2 hours and 53 minutes
- Game attendance: 80,795
- Game weather: Temperature: 78 °F (26 °C) • Weather: Partly Sunny • Wind: SSE 7 MPH
- Referee: Dennis Hennigan
- TV announcers (NBC): Tom Hammond, Pat Haden and Alex Flanagan (sideline)

Scoring summary
1	08:42	ND	Kyle Rudolph 19–yard pass from Jimmy Clausen (Nick Tausch kick)	ND 7–0
2	14:54	ND	Michael Floyd 24–yard pass from Jimmy Clausen (Nick Tausch kick)	ND 14–0
2	11:42	ND	Michael Floyd 70–yard pass from Jimmy Clausen (Nick Tausch kick)	ND 21–0
2	01:48	ND	Armando Allen 1–yard run (Nick Tausch kick)	ND 28–0
3	10:12	ND	Michael Floyd 88–yard pass from Jimmy Clausen (Nick Tausch kick)	ND 35–0

=== At Colorado State ===
Nevada at Colorado State

Team	1	2	3	4	Total
Wolf Pack	0	0	6	14	20
• Rams	14	0	7	14	35

- Date: September 19, 2009
- Location: Hughes Stadium
  Fort Collins, CO
- Game start: 3:06 p.m. MDT
- Elapsed time: 2 hours and 59 minutes
- Game attendance: 24,967
- Game weather: Temperature: 75 °F (24 °C) • Weather: Sunny • Wind: S 10 MPH
- Referee: Ed Ardito
- TV announcers (None): None

Scoring summary
1	08:42	CSU	John Mosure 1–yard run (Ben Deline kick)	CSU 7–0
1	02:03	CSU	Eric Peitz 25–yard pass from Dion Morton (Ben Deline kick)	CSU 14–0
3	12:08	NEV	Vai Taua 31–yard run (Ricky Drake kick failed)	CSU 14–6
3	06:22	CSU	Dion Morton 49–yard pass from Grant Stucker (Ben Deline kick)	CSU 21–6
4	14:53	CSU	Zac Pauga 32–yard pass from Grant Stucker (Ben Deline kick)	CSU 28–6
4	06:43	CSU	Grant Stucker 35–yard run (Ben Deline kick)	CSU 35–6
4	03:08	NEV	Vai Taua 2–yard run (rush)	CSU 35–14
4	00:00	NEV	Brandon Wimberly 13–yard pass from Colin Kaepernick	CSU 35–20

=== Missouri ===
Missouri at Nevada

Team	1	2	3	4	Total
• Tigers	6	6	9	10	31
Wolf Pack	7	0	6	8	21

- Date: September 25, 2009
- Location: Mackay Stadium
  Reno, NV
- Game start: 6:01 p.m. PDT
- Elapsed time: 3 hours and 14 minutes
- Game attendance: 18,269
- Game weather: Temperature: 89 °F (32 °C) • Weather: Clear • Wind: 5 MPH
- Referee: Adrian Hill
- TV announcers (ESPN): Joe Tessitore and Rod Gilmore

Scoring summary
1	10:47	MU	Grant Ressel 22–yard field goal	MU 3–0
1	04:57	NEV	Courtney Randall 2–yard run (Ricky Drake kick)	NEV 7–3
1	01:00	MU	Grant Ressel 31–yard field goal	NEV 7–6
2	02:09	MU	Danario Alexander 31–yard pass from Blaine Gabbert (Derrick Washington pass failed)	MU 12–7
3	11:07	NEV	Colin Kaepernick 11–yard run (Courtney Randall rush failed)	NEV 13–12
3	10:30	MU	Danario Alexander 74–yard pass from Blaine Gabbert (pass failed)	MU 18–13
3	04:17	MU	Grant Ressel 27–yard field goal	MU 21–13
4	10:07	MU	Jared Perry 4–yard pass from Blaine Gabbert (Grant Ressel kick)	MU 28–13
4	05:00	MU	Grant Ressel 26–yard field goal	MU 31–13
4	02:32	NEV	Brandon Wimberly 6–yard pass from Colin Kaepernick (rush)	MU 31–21

=== UNLV ===
UNLV at Nevada
(Battle for the Fremont Cannon)

Team	1	2	3	4	Total
Rebels	0	21	7	0	28
• Wolf Pack	14	7	14	28	63

- Date: October 3, 2009
- Location: Mackay Stadium
  Reno, NV
- Game start: 1:05 p.m. PDT
- Elapsed time: 3 hours and 32 minutes
- Game attendance: 24,078
- Game weather: Temperature: 67 °F (19 °C) • Weather: Clear • Wind: 23 MPH
- Referee: Rick Loumiet
- TV announcers (None): None

Scoring summary
1	10:44	NEV	Luke Lippincott 12–yard run (Ricky Drake kick)	NEV 7–0
1	04:41	NEV	Mike Ball 10–yard run (Ricky Drake kick)	NEV 14–0
2	14:28	UNLV	Channing Trotter 2–yard run (Kyle Watson kick)	NEV 14–7
2	10:25	NEV	Mike Ball 1–yard run (Ricky Drake kick)	NEV 21–7
2	07:27	UNLV	Jerriman Robinson 39–yard pass from Mike Clausen (Kyle Watson kick)	NEV 21–14
2	00:15	UNLV	Channing Trotter 1–yard run (Kyle Watson kick)	TIE 21–21
3	11:43	NEV	Mike Ball 32–yard run (Ricky Drake kick)	NEV 28–21
3	04:20	UNLV	C.J. Cox 23–yard run (Kyle Watson kick)	TIE 28–28
3	00:50	NEV	Mike Ball 4–yard run (Ricky Drake kick)	NEV 35–28
4	11:21	NEV	Virgil Green 17–yard pass from Colin Kaepernick (Ricky Drake kick)	NEV 42–28
4	06:59	NEV	Colin Kaepernick 6–yard pass from Luke Lippincott (Ricky Drake kick)	NEV 49–28
4	04:37	NEV	Mike Ball 89–yard run (Ricky Drake kick)	NEV 56–28
4	03:04	NEV	Courtney Randall 26–yard run (Ricky Drake kick)	NEV 63–28

=== Louisiana Tech ===
Louisiana Tech at Nevada

Team	1	2	3	4	Total
Bulldogs	7	0	7	0	14
• Wolf Pack	14	3	13	7	37

- Date: October 9, 2009
- Location: Mackay Stadium
  Reno, NV
- Game start: 6:01 p.m. PDT
- Elapsed time: 3 hours
- Game attendance: 11,975
- Game weather: Temperature: 69 °F (21 °C) • Weather: Clear • Wind: 11 MPH
- Referee: Roger Gaskamp
- TV announcers (ESPN): Joe Tessitore and Rod Gilmore

Scoring summary
1	14:16	LATECH	Daniel Porter 15–yard run (Matt Nelson kick)	LATECH 7–0
1	04:34	NEV	Talaiasi Puloka Jr. 3–yard pass from Colin Kaepernick (Ricky Drake kick)	TIE 7–7
1	00:29	NEV	Colin Kaepernick 5–yard run (Ricky Drake kick)	NEV 14–7
2	10:22	NEV	Ricky Drake 40–yard field goal	NEV 17–7
3	10:15	NEV	Brandon Wimberly 24–yard pass from Colin Kaepernick (Ricky Drake kick failed)	NEV 23–7
3	09:56	LATECH	Daniel Porter 64–yard run (Matt Nelson kick)	NEV 23–14
3	01:57	NEV	Colin Kaepernick 67–yard run (Ricky Drake kick)	NEV 30–14
4	14:49	NEV	Virgil Green 3–yard pass from Colin Kaepernick (Ricky Drake kick)	NEV 37–14

=== At Utah State ===
Nevada at Utah State

Team	1	2	3	4	Total
• Wolf Pack	0	14	7	14	35
Aggies	7	14	3	8	32

- Date: October 17, 2009
- Location: Romney Stadium
  Logan, UT
- Game start: 1:07 p.m. MDT
- Elapsed time: 3 hours and 12 minutes
- Game attendance: 15,103
- Game weather: Temperature: 59 °F (15 °C) • Weather: Brisk, Clear and Sunny • Wind: N/A
- Referee: R.G. Detillier
- TV announcers (KAME-TV/CSNCA/XXL Sports/Cis–Com): N/A

Scoring summary
1	06:41	USU	Robert Turbin 1–yard run (Chris Ulinski kick)	USU 7–0
2	12:25	USU	Eric Moats 8–yard pass from Diondre Borel (Chris Ulinski kick)	USU 14–0
2	10:54	NEV	Luke Lippincott 11–yard pass from Colin Kaepernick (Ricky Drake kick)	USU 14–7
2	08:38	USU	Robert Turbin 32–yard pass from Diondre Borel (Chris Ulinski kick)	USU 21–7
2	03:56	NEV	Virgil Green 44–yard from Colin Kaepernick (Ricky Drake kick)	USU 21–14
3	10:23	USU	Chris Ulinski 48–yard field goal	USU 24–14
3	01:49	NEV	Vai Taua 5–yard run (Ricky Drake kick)	USU 24–21
4	09:02	NEV	Brandon Wimberly 49–yard pass from Colin Kaepernick (Ricky Drake kick)	NEV 28–24
4	04:08	NEV	Luke Lippincott 69–yard run (Ricky Drake kick)	NEV 35–24
4	02:35	USU	Nnamdi Gwacham 14–yard pass from Diondre Borel (Robert Turbin pass)	NEV 35–32

=== Idaho ===
Idaho at Nevada

Team	1	2	3	4	Total
Vandals	0	24	14	7	45
• Wolf Pack	14	14	21	21	70

- Date: October 24, 2009
- Location: Mackay Stadium
  Reno, NV
- Game start: 1:07 p.m. PDT
- Elapsed time: 3 hours and 20 minutes
- Game attendance: 16,611
- Game weather: Temperature: 65 °F (18 °C) • Weather: Partly Cloudy • Wind: NW 5 MPH
- Referee: Daniel Romeo
- TV announcers (None): None

Scoring summary
1	09:27	NEV	Colin Kaepernick 11–yard run (Ricky Drake kick)	NEV 7–0
1	04:42	NEV	Vai Taua 89–yard run (Ricky Drake kick)	NEV 14–0
2	13:26	NEV	Colin Kaepernick 61–yard run (Ricky Drake kick)	NEV 21–0
2	12:47	IDAHO	Maurice Shaw 73–yard pass from Nathan Enderle (Trey Farquhar kick)	NEV 21–7
2	11:15	IDAHO	Deonte Jackson 59–yard run (Trey Farquhar kick)	NEV 21–14
2	04:12	NEV	Vai Taua 1–yard run (Ricky Drake kick)	NEV 28–14
2	03:06	IDAHO	Maurice Shaw 73–yard pass from Nathan Enderle (Trey Farquhar kick)	NEV 28–21
2	00:35	IDAHO	Trey Farquhar 54–yard field goal	NEV 28–24
3	14:09	NEV	Colin Kaepernick 35–yard run (Ricky Drake kick)	NEV 35–24
3	10:29	NEV	Colin Kaepernick 75–yard run (Ricky Drake kick)	NEV 42–24
3	06:11	IDAHO	Max Komar 9–yard pass from Nathan Enderle (Trey Farquhar kick)	NEV 42–31
3	01:52	NEV	Chris Wellington 25–yard run (Ricky Drake kick)	NEV 49–31
3	00:48	IDAHO	Max Komar 20–yard pass from Nathan Enderle (Trey Farquhar kick)	NEV 49–38
4	14:23	NEV	Virgil Green 44–yard pass from Colin Kaepernick (Ricky Drake kick)	NEV 56–38
4	09:30	NEV	Luke Lippincott 9–yard pass from Colin Kaepernick (Ricky Drake kick)	NEV 63–38
4	07:09	NEV	Lampford Mark 12–yard run (Ricky Drake kick)	NEV 70–38
4	02:55	IDAHO	Max Komar 14–yard pass from Brian Reader (Trey Farquhar kick)	NEV 70–45

=== Hawaii ===
Hawaii at Nevada

Team	1	2	3	4	Total
Warriors	14	0	0	7	21
• Wolf Pack	7	14	7	3	31

- Date: October 31, 2009
- Location: Mackay Stadium
  Reno, NV
- Game start: 1:07 p.m. PDT
- Elapsed time: 3 hours and 15 minutes
- Game attendance: 14,735
- Game weather: Temperature: 60 °F (16 °C) • Weather: Sunny • Wind: None
- Referee: Land Clark
- TV announcers (Oceanic PPV): Jim Leahey and Russell Yamanoha

Scoring summary
1	10:53	UH	Kealoha Pilares 18–yard pass from Bryant Moniz (Scott Enos kick)	UH 7–0
1	08:48	UH	Jovonte Taylor 71–yard pass from Bryant Moniz (Scott Enos kick)	UH 14–0
1	03:34	NEV	Colin Kaepernick 2–yard run (Ricky Drake kick)	UH 14–7
2	01:48	NEV	Vai Taua 30–yard pass from Colin Kaepernick (Ricky Drake kick)	TIE 14–14
2	00:31	NEV	Colin Kaepernick 38–yard run (Ricky Drake kick)	NEV 21–14
3	03:18	NEV	Tray Session 40–yard pass from Colin Kaepernick (Ricky Drake kick)	NEV 28–14
4	06:18	UH	Jovonte Taylor 4–yard pass from Bryant Moniz (Scott Enos kick)	NEV 28–21
4	01:18	NEV	Ricky Drake 27–yard field goal	NEV 31–21

=== At San Jose State ===
Nevada at San Jose State

Team	1	2	3	4	Total
• Wolf Pack	6	28	14	14	62
Spartans	0	0	0	7	7

- Date: November 8, 2009
- Location: Spartan Stadium
  San Jose, CA
- Game start: 5:32 p.m. PST
- Elapsed time: 3 hours and 6 minutes
- Game attendance: 11,103
- Game weather: Temperature: 60 °F (16 °C) • Weather: Clear Skies • Wind: WNW 7 MPH
- Referee: Terry Leyden
- TV announcers (ESPN): Terry Gannon and David Norrie

Scoring summary
1	10:17	NEV	Colin Kaepernick 19–yard run (Ricky Drake kick failed)	NEV 6–0
2	12:38	NEV	Colin Kaepernick 15–yard run (Ricky Drake kick)	NEV 13–0
2	05:39	NEV	Colin Kaepernick 4–yard run (Ricky Drake kick)	NEV 20–0
2	01:45	NEV	Luke Lippincott 3–yard run (Ricky Drake kick)	NEV 27–0
2	00:13	NEV	Vai Taua 70–yard run (Ricky Drake kick)	NEV 34–0
3	11:42	NEV	Luke Lippincott 8–yard run (Ricky Drake kick)	NEV 41–0
3	09:25	NEV	L.J. Washington 46–yard pass from Colin Kaepernick (Ricky Drake kick)	NEV 48–0
4	14:29	NEV	Courtney Randall 3–yard run (Ricky Drake kick)	NEV 55–0
4	10:50	SJSU	Patrick Perry 1–yard run (Tyler Cope kick)	NEV 55–7
4	03:41	NEV	Lampford Mark 6–yard run (Ricky Drake kick)	NEV 62–7

=== Fresno State ===
Fresno State at Nevada

Team	1	2	3	4	Total
Bulldogs	14	0	0	0	14
• Wolf Pack	10	14	14	14	52

- Date: November 14, 2009
- Location: Mackay Stadium
  Reno, NV
- Game start: 1:07 p.m. PST
- Elapsed time: 2 hours and 57 minutes
- Game attendance: 19,331
- Game weather: Temperature: 43 °F (6 °C) • Weather: Sunny and Clear • Wind: Calm
- Referee: Randy Smith
- TV announcers (CSNCA/ESPNGP): Ralph Wood, Randy Rosenbloom and Guy Haberman (sideline)

Scoring summary
1	11:47	FS	Jamel Hamler 57–yard pass from Ryan Colburn (Kevin Goessling kick)	FS 7–0
1	08:52	NEV	Vai Taua 50–yard run (Ricky Drake kick)	TIE 7–7
1	06:24	FS	Seyi Ajirotutu 3–yard pass from Ryan Colburn (Kevin Goessling kick)	FS 14–7
1	00:38	NEV	Ricky Drake 40–yard field goal	FS 14–10
2	06:51	NEV	Luke Lippincott 1–yard run (Ricky Drake kick)	NEV 17–14
2	02:31	NEV	Vai Taua 65–yard run (Ricky Drake kick)	NEV 24–14
3	12:07	NEV	Colin Kaepernick 6–yard run (Ricky Drake kick)	NEV 31–14
3	10:40	NEV	Luke Lippincott 27–yard run (Ricky Drake kick)	NEV 38–14
4	08:54	NEV	Luke Lippincott 4–yard run (Ricky Drake kick)	NEV 45–14
4	07:36	NEV	Colin Kaepernick 21–yard run (Ricky Drake kick)	NEV 52–14

=== At New Mexico State ===
Nevada at New Mexico State

Team	1	2	3	4	Total
• Wolf Pack	28	14	14	7	63
Aggies	3	3	0	14	20

- Date: November 21, 2009
- Location: Aggie Memorial Stadium
  Las Cruces, NM
- Game start: 8:35 p.m. MST
- Elapsed time: 2 hours and 50 minutes
- Game attendance: 11,775
- Game weather: Temperature: 46 °F (8 °C) • Weather: Clear • Wind: W 5 MPH
- Referee: Robert Cameron
- TV announcers (ESPNU): Mike Morgan and J. C. Pearson

Scoring summary
1	11:20	NMSU	Kyle Hughes 31–yard field goal	NMSU 3–0
1	10:07	NEV	Chris Wellington 56–yard pass from Colin Kaepernick (Ricky Drake kick)	NEV 7–3
1	08:21	NEV	Colin Kaepernick 57–yard run (Ricky Drake kick)	NEV 14–3
1	05:43	NEV	Luke Lippincott 28–yard run (Ricky Drake kick)	NEV 21–3
1	02:28	NEV	Vai Taua 23–yard run (Ricky Drake kick)	NEV 28–3
2	14:51	NMSU	Kyle Hughes 21–yard field goal	NEV 28–6
2	08:22	NEV	Colin Kaepernick 7–yard run (Ricky Drake kick)	NEV 35–6
2	00:19	NEV	Vai Taua 16–yard pass from Colin Kaepernick (Ricky Drake kick)	NEV 42–6
3	11:08	NEV	Luke Lippincott 32–yard run (Ricky Drake kick)	NEV 49–6
3	04:44	NEV	Tyler Lantrip 4–yard run (Ricky Drake kick)	NEV 56–6
4	14:16	NEV	Lampford Mark 23–yard run (Nick Rhodes kick)	NEV 63–6
4	09:57	NMSU	Marcus Allen 14–yard pass from Jeff Fleming (Kyle Hughes kick)	NEV 63–13
4	00:17	NMSU	Marcus Allen 11–yard pass from Jeff Fleming (Kyle Hughes kick)	NEV 63–20

=== At Boise State ===
Nevada at Boise State
(rivalry)

Team	1	2	3	4	Total
Wolf Pack	0	16	10	7	33
• No. 6 Broncos	20	7	7	10	44

- Date: November 27, 2009
- Location: Bronco Stadium
  Boise, ID
- Game start: 8:08 p.m. MST
- Elapsed time: 3 hours and 26 minutes
- Game attendance: 32,642
- Game weather: Temperature: 37 °F (3 °C) • Weather: Light Rain • Wind: WNW 10 MPH
- Referee: Rich Kollen
- TV announcers (ESPN2): Joe Tessitore and Rod Gilmore

Scoring summary
1	14:45	BSU	Titus Young 95–yard kickoff return (Kyle Brotzman kick)	BSU 7–0
1	09:03	BSU	Dan Paul 18–yard pass from Kellen Moore (Austin Pettis rush failed)	BSU 13–0
1	04:20	BSU	Dan Paul 3–yard pass from Kellen Moore (Kyle Brotzman kick)	BSU 20–0
2	13:36	NEV	Ricky Drake 26–yard field goal	BSU 20–3
2	09:59	BSU	Dan Paul 1–yard pass from Kellen Moore (Kyle Brotzman kick)	BSU 27–3
2	03:38	NEV	Virgil Green 6–yard pass from Colin Kaepernick (Ricky Drake kick failed)	BSU 27–9
2	00:03	NEV	Brandon Wimberly 3–yard pass from Colin Kaepernick (Ricky Drake kick)	BSU 27–16
3	09:38	NEV	Ricky Drake 37–yard field goal	BSU 27–19
3	02:40	BSU	Tommy Gallarda 21–yard pass from Kellen Moore (Kyle Brotzman kick)	BSU 34–19
3	02:23	NEV	Vai Taua 71–yard run (Ricky Drake kick)	BSU 34–26
4	10:55	BSU	Kyle Brotzman 27–yard field goal	BSU 37–26
4	05:08	BSU	Kirby Moore 6–yard pass from Kellen Moore (Kyle Brotzman kick)	BSU 44–26
4	01:16	NEV	Tray Session 23–yard pass from Colin Kaepernick (Ricky Drake kick)	BSU 44–33

=== Vs. SMU ===
Nevada vs. SMU
(Hawaii Bowl)

Team	1	2	3	4	Total
Wolf Pack	0	0	3	7	10
• Mustangs	17	14	7	7	45

- Date: December 24, 2009
- Location: Aloha Stadium
  Halawa, HI
- Game start: 3:01 p.m.
- Elapsed time: 3 hours and 23 minutes
- Game attendance: 32,650
- Game weather: Temperature: 77 °F (25 °C) • Weather: Humidity 64% • Wind: Calm
- Referee: Land Clark
- TV announcers (ESPN): Terry Gannon and David Norrie

Scoring summary
1	13:29	SMU	Shawnbrey McNeal 9–yard run (Matt Szymanski kick)	SMU 7–0
1	08:22	SMU	Shawnbrey McNeal 1–yard run (Matt Szymanski kick)	SMU 14–0
1	02:49	SMU	Matt Szymanski 22–yard field goal	SMU 17–0
2	05:37	SMU	Emmanuel Sanders 17–yard pass from Kyle Padron (Matt Szymanski kick)	SMU 24–0
2	01:17	SMU	Cole Beasley 2–yard pass from Kyle Padron (Matt Szymanski kick)	SMU 31–0
3	07:45	SMU	Zach Line 3–yard run (Matt Szymanski kick)	SMU 38–0
3	03:08	NEV	Ricky Drake 21–yard field goal	SMU 38–3
4	03:27	SMU	Shawnbrey McNeal 17–yard run (Matt Szymanski kick)	SMU 45–3
4	01:04	NEV	Brandon Wimberly 10–yard pass from Colin Kaepernick (Ricky Drake kick)	SMU 45–10
