= 2009 Hawaii Bowl =

2009 Sheraton Hawaii Bowl
Nevada Wolf Pack	SMU Mustangs
(8–4)	(7–5)
WAC	C-USA
10	45
Head coach: Chris Ault	Head coach: June Jones
	1	2	3	4	Total
Nevada	0	0	3	7	10
SMU	17	14	7	7	45
- Date: December 24, 2009
- Season: 2009
- Stadium: Aloha Stadium
- Location: Halawa, Hawaii
- MVP: QB Kyle Padron (SMU); DE Kevin Basped (Nevada)
- Referee: Land Clark (MW)
- Halftime show: Henry Kapono
- Attendance: 32,650
- Payout: US$750,000 per team

United States TV coverage
- Network: ESPN
- Announcers: Terry Gannon (play-by-play); David Norrie (color commentator)

The 2009 Sheraton Hawaii Bowl was the eighth edition of the college football bowl game, played at Aloha Stadium in Halawa, Hawaii. The game started at 3:00 pm local time (8:00 pm EST) on Thursday of Christmas Eve 2009, with the SMU Mustangs of Conference USA beating the Nevada Wolf Pack of the Western Athletic Conference, 45–10. The game was sponsored by Sheraton Hotels and Resorts and was televised on ESPN.

The 2009 Hawaiʻi Bowl was SMU's first bowl bid since playing in Hawaii in the 1984 Aloha Bowl, as well as their first since the program was relaunched in 1989 after being shut down for two years due to massive NCAA rules violations. Head coach June Jones made his first appearance as a coach in Aloha Stadium since leaving Hawaiʻi in 2008 to take over the SMU football program.

SMU freshman starter Kyle Padron, who was a backup until an injury earlier in the season to then starter Bo Levi Mitchell, was named the game's MVP after throwing for 460 yards and two touchdowns.

The two teams met for the first time since 2004 when they were both members of the WAC. They previously played five times from 2000 to 2004, with Nevada having led the series with a 3–2 record. Prior to this game, their last meeting was a 38–20 victory by SMU.

== Game summary ==
=== Scoring summary ===
Scoring Play	Score
1st Quarter
SMU - Shawnbrey McNeal 9 Yd run (Matt Szymanski kick), 13:29	SMU 7–0
SMU - Shawnbrey McNeal 2 Yd run (Matt Szymanski kick), 8:22	SMU 14–0
SMU - Matt Szymanski 22 Yd, 2:49	SMU 17–0
2nd Quarter
SMU - Emmanuel Sanders 17 Yd pass from Kyle Padron (Matt Szymanski kick), 5:37	SMU 24–0
SMU - Cole Beasley 2 Yd pass from Kyle Padron (Matt Szymanski kick), 1:17	SMU 31–0
3rd Quarter
SMU - Zach Line 3 Yd run (Matt Szymanski kick), 7:45	SMU 38–0
NEV - Ricky Drake 21 Yd, 3:08	SMU 38–3
4th Quarter
SMU - Shawnbrey McNeal 17 Yd run (Matt Szymanski kick), 3:27	SMU 45–3
NEV - Brandon Wimberly 10 Yd pass from Colin Kaepernick (Ricky Drake kick), 1:04	SMU 45–10
