= Emmanuel Sanders =

American football player (born 1987)

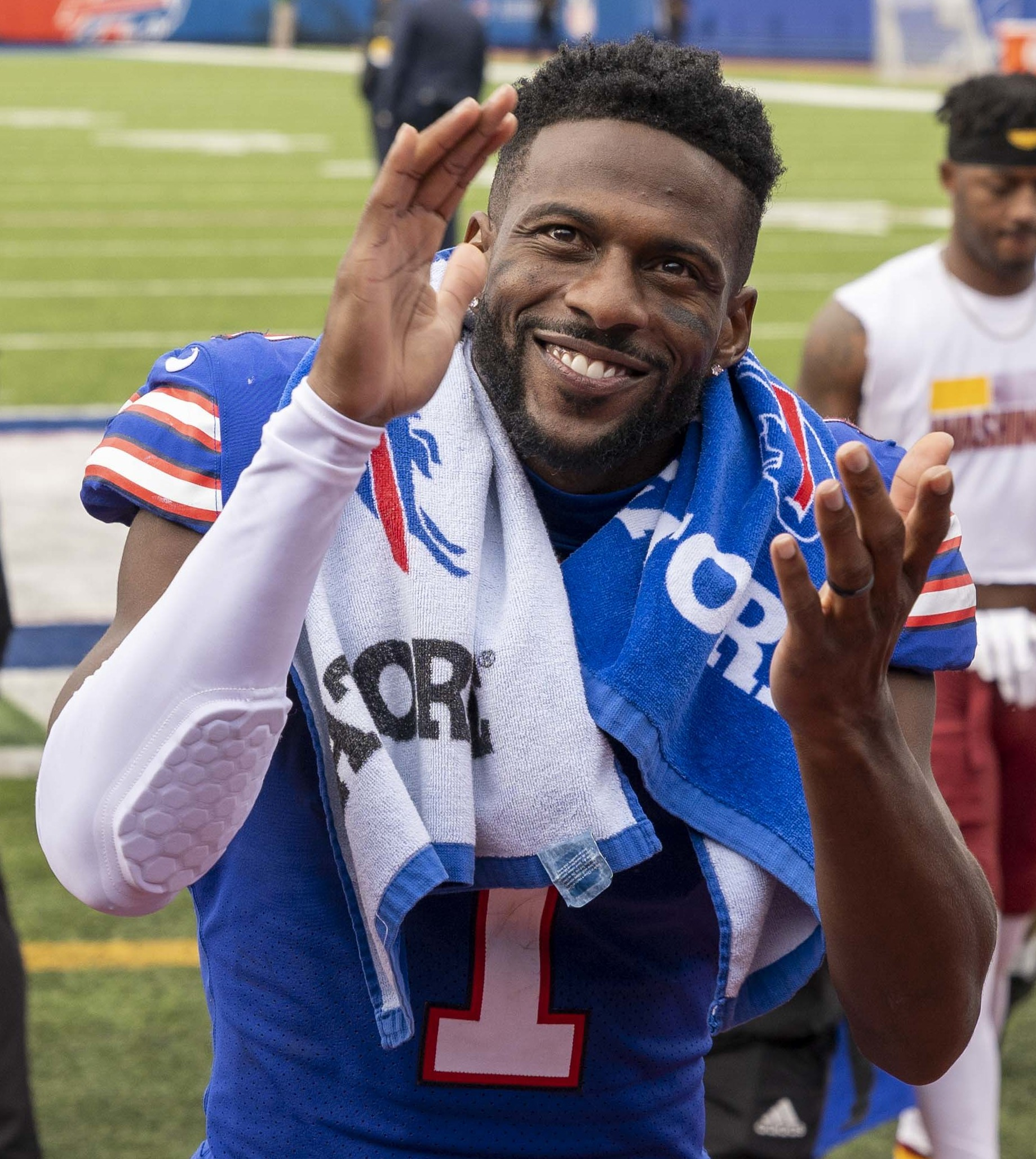
- Sanders with the Buffalo Bills in 2021

No. 88, 10, 17, 1
- Position: Wide receiver

Personal information
- Born: March 17, 1987 (age 39); Bellville, Texas, U.S.
- Listed height: 5 ft 11 in (1.80 m)
- Listed weight: 180 lb (82 kg)

Career information
- High school: Bellville
- College: SMU (2005–2009)
- NFL draft: 2010: 3rd round, 82nd overall pick

Career history
- Pittsburgh Steelers (2010–2013); Denver Broncos (2014–2019); San Francisco 49ers (2019); New Orleans Saints (2020); Buffalo Bills (2021)

Awards and highlights
- Super Bowl champion (50); 2× Pro Bowl (2014, 2016); First-team All-C-USA (2009); Second-team All-C-USA (2008)

Career NFL statistics
- Receptions: 704
- Receiving yards: 9,245
- Return yards: 1,370
- Rushing yards: 202
- Total touchdowns: 52
- Stats at Pro Football Reference

Emmanuel Niamiah Sanders (born March 17, 1987) is an American former professional football wide receiver who played for 12 seasons in the National Football League (NFL). He played college football for the SMU Mustangs, and was drafted by the Pittsburgh Steelers in the third round of the 2010 NFL draft. Sanders won Super Bowl 50 with the Denver Broncos, and also played for the San Francisco 49ers, New Orleans Saints, and Buffalo Bills.

== Early life ==
Sanders attended Bellville High School in Bellville, Texas, where he was a four-sport star in football, basketball, baseball, and track. In football, in which he was most notable, Sanders was a first-team All-District performer at running back, wide receiver, and safety. As a senior, he rushed for 499 yards with six touchdowns, hauled in 24 catches for 414 yards and a score while also throwing for a touchdown. On defense, he recorded 49 tackles and three interceptions. He was named Team MVP and Tri-County Offensive Player of the Year following his senior season. In all, he earned seven All-District honors during his high school career. Regarded only as a two-star recruit by both Rivals.com and Scout.com, Sanders chose SMU over scholarship offers from TCU, Kansas, Baylor, and Houston.

== College career ==
After graduating from high school, Sanders was a three-year starter at Southern Methodist University under head coaches Phil Bennett and June Jones. He was awarded All-Conference honors his last two seasons.

As a redshirt freshman, Sanders scored his first collegiate touchdown against Sam Houston on September 16, 2006. His game against Sam Houston started a streak of six consecutive games with at least one touchdown for Sanders. He had his breakout game against Houston with nine receptions for 151 yards and two touchdowns on November 11. Overall, he had 46 receptions for 605 yards and nine touchdowns as the Mustangs went 6–6.

On October 20, 2007, Sanders had eight receptions for 155 yards and two touchdowns against Tulane. In the Mustangs' final game of the 2007 season on November 24, he had 13 receptions for 118 yards and three touchdowns against Memphis. As a sophomore, he had 74 receptions for 889 yards and nine touchdowns as the Mustangs went 1–11.

On August 29, 2008, in the first game of the 2008 season, Sanders had eight receptions for 121 yards and one touchdown against Rice. In the following game, against Texas State, he had eight receptions for 138 yards and three touchdowns. On October 11, he had six receptions for 132 yards and a touchdown against Tulsa. As a junior, he had 67 receptions for 958 yards and nine touchdowns as the Mustangs went 1–11.

As a senior, Sanders was very productive. On September 12, 2009, against Alabama-Birmingham, he had nine receptions for 148 yards and one touchdown. In the following game against Washington State, he had 18 receptions for 178 yards. On November 7, against Rice, he had six receptions for 136 yards and one touchdown. In the next game against UTEP, he had seven receptions for 134 yards and two touchdowns. Two weeks later, against Tulane, he had six receptions for 144 yards. In the Hawaii Bowl against Nevada, he had seven receptions ofr 124 yards and one touchdown in the win. He had 98 receptions for 1,339 and seven touchdowns as the Mustangs went 8–5. In addition, he averaged 13.8 yards on 20 punt returns with an additional score, which came in the Mustangs' first game against Stephen F. Austin. He led Conference USA in receiving yards in 2009.

== Professional career ==
Pre-draft measurables
Height	Weight	Arm length	Hand span	40-yard dash	10-yard split	20-yard shuttle	Three-cone drill	Vertical jump	Broad jump	Bench press	Wonderlic
5 ft 10 7/8 in (1.80 m)	186 lb (84 kg)	32 in (0.81 m)	9 1/4 in (0.23 m)	4.41 s	1.49 s	4.10 s	6.64 s	39 1/2 in (1.00 m)	10 ft 6 in (3.20 m)	12 reps	18
All values from NFL Combine

=== Pittsburgh Steelers ===
==== 2010 season ====
The Pittsburgh Steelers selected Sanders in the third round (82nd overall) of the 2010 NFL draft. He was the seventh wide receiver selected and was the first of two wide receivers the Steelers selected in 2010, along with Antonio Brown.

On June 15, 2010, the Steelers signed Sanders to a three-year, $1.80 million contract that includes a signing bonus of $586,000.

Throughout training camp, he competed for the fourth wide receiver position on the depth chart against Antonio Brown and Tyler Grisham. Head coach Mike Tomlin named Sanders the fifth wide receiver on the depth chart to begin the regular season, behind Hines Ward, Mike Wallace, Antwaan Randle El, and Arnaz Battle.

Sanders made his NFL debut in the Steelers' 15–9 season-opening victory against the Atlanta Falcons. He missed the next three games (Weeks 2–4) as a healthy scratch after the Steelers' coaching staff elected to use Antonio Brown instead due to his added special teams abilities. On October 17, 2010, Sanders caught a 22-yard pass from quarterback Ben Roethlisberger in the second quarter to mark his first NFL reception. After Week 9, Sanders received increased playing time after he surpassed Antwaan Randle El on the depth chart and became the No. 3 wide receiver. In Week 10, he caught five passes for 41 yards and scored his first NFL touchdown on a six-yard pass from Ben Roethlisberger in the Steelers' 39–26 loss to the New England Patriots.

Sanders finished his rookie year with 28 receptions for 376 yards and two touchdowns in 13 games and one start. He also had 25 kick returns for 628 yards and logged ten combined tackles on special teams.

During the 2010 season, Sanders, Wallace, and Brown became collectively known as the "Young Money Family" or "Young Money Crew," inspired by the rapper Lil Wayne. Within the group, Sanders was sometimes referred to as "Easy Money" since his first initial is "E." The wide receiver trio also dubbed the nickname "Bugatti Boys" for themselves, also after a rap group.

The Steelers finished atop the AFC North with a 12–4 record and clinched a first round bye in the playoffs. On January 15, 2011, Sanders appeared in his first NFL playoff game and caught four passes for 54 yards in the Steelers' 31–24 victory over the Baltimore Ravens in the AFC Divisional Round. They went on to play in the Super Bowl after defeating the New York Jets 24–19 in the AFC Championship game. On February 6, 2011, Sanders played in Super Bowl XLV and had two catches for 17 yards before leaving in the second quarter after suffering a foot injury while making a 13-yard catch. He was immediately carted off the field and was unable to return. The Steelers went on to lose 31–25 to the Green Bay Packers. It was discovered that Sanders had fractured his foot during the game.

==== 2011 season ====
On April 4, 2011, Sanders underwent surgery on his foot after he continually had issues after he fractured it during Super Bowl XLV. Sanders entered training camp competing against Antonio Brown and Antwaan Randle El for the No. 3 wide receiver position. He was unable to play in the first three preseason games after developing a stress fracture in his foot. He was named the fourth wide receiver on the depth chart to begin the regular season, behind Hines Ward, Mike Wallace, and Antonio Brown.

He missed games in Week 9 and Week 10 after undergoing arthroscopic knee surgery. Sanders missed three more games during the season (Weeks 14–16) after developing inflammation in his left foot.

Sanders finished the 2011 season with 22 receptions for 288 yards and two touchdowns in 11 games and zero starts. On January 8, 2012, Sanders caught six passes for 81 yards during a 29–23 overtime loss to the Denver Broncos in the AFC Wild Card Round.

==== 2012 season ====
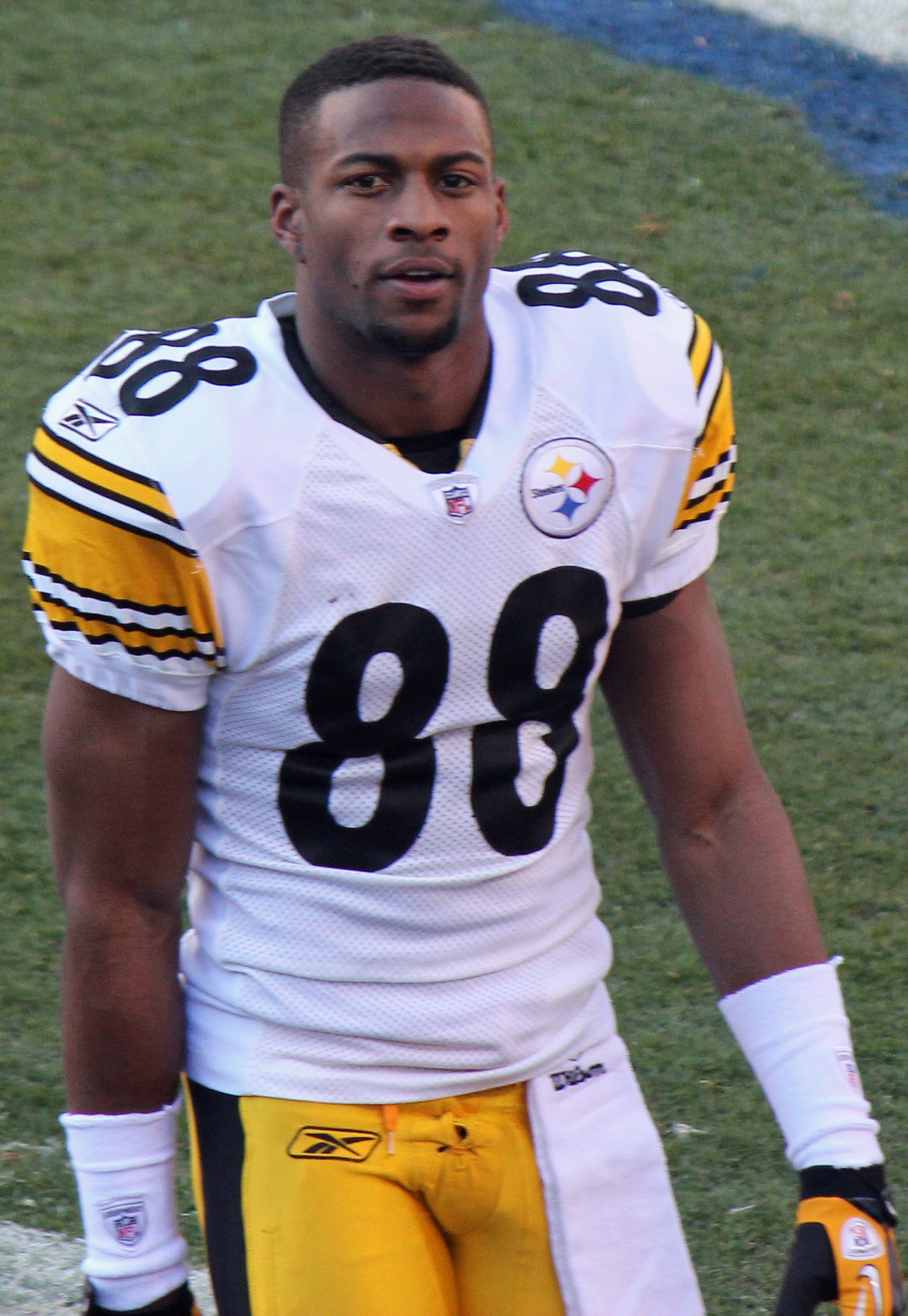
Sanders in 2012

The 2012 off-season saw the retirement of Hines Ward and offensive coordinator Bruce Arians after the Steelers' opted to not extend him a contract offer. Sanders entered camp as the third wide receiver on the depth chart, but began competing to be a starting wide receiver after Mike Wallace held out due to his contract. Head coach Mike Tomlin named Sanders the No. 3 wide receiver on the depth chart to start the regular season, behind Mike Wallace and Antonio Brown.

On October 21, 2012, Sanders earned his second NFL start in a 24–17 win at the Cincinnati Bengals. During the fourth quarter, he went down with a leg injury after quarterback Ben Roethlisberger was sacked. Although the Steelers had a timeout, it was thought that Sanders had faked the leg cramp to stop the clock. On November 9, 2012, the NFL fined Sanders $15,000 and the Steelers $35,000 for the incident. NFL Vice President of Operations Ray Anderson used video evidence of Sanders out-sprinting his teammates, just one play after sitting out from his injury, as proof that the injury was fake. This was the first time in league history a player has been fined for faking an injury.

Sanders finished the 2012 season with 44 receptions for 626 yards and a touchdown in 16 games and seven starts. The Pittsburgh Steelers finished 8–8 in 2012 and did not qualify for the playoffs.

==== 2013 season ====
On March 12, 2013, the Steelers assigned an original rounder tender to Sanders as a restricted free agent. The tender gave them a third-round pick from any team who signs Sanders or the option to match any contract offer by any teams attempting to sign Sanders. On March 15, 2013, Sanders attended a private visit with the New England Patriots and received an offer sheet. On April 10, 2013, Sanders officially signed his offer sheet from the New England Patriots and the Steelers were given five days to match. On April 14, 2013, the Steelers matched the Patriots' offer sheet, retaining Sanders for the 2013 season.

Head coach Mike Tomlin named Sanders and Antonio Brown the starting wide receivers to start the regular season, after Mike Wallace signed with the Miami Dolphins during free agency. Sanders finished the 2013 season with 67 receptions for 740 yards and six touchdowns in 16 games and ten starts.

Sanders became a free agent after 2013 and was a highly sought-after player. He received offers from the New England Patriots, Oakland Raiders, Kansas City Chiefs, Denver Broncos, Jacksonville Jaguars, and Tampa Bay Buccaneers and also had a visit planned with the San Francisco 49ers. The Pittsburgh Steelers did not extend an offer to Sanders.

=== Denver Broncos ===
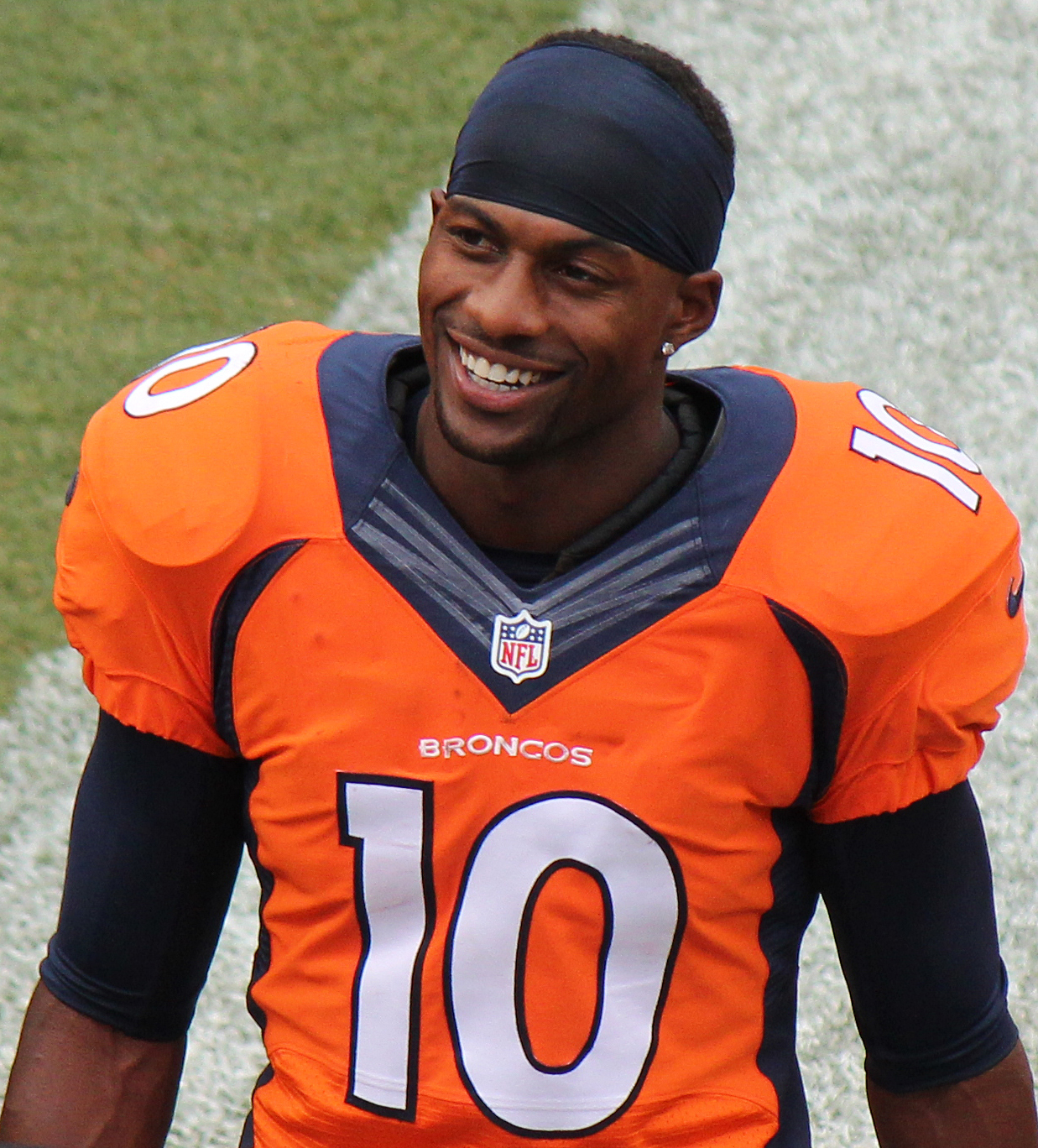
Sanders with the Denver Broncos in 2014

On March 15, 2014, the Denver Broncos signed Sanders to a three-year, $15 million contract that includes $6 million guaranteed and a signing bonus of $3 million. The next day, executives representing the Kansas City Chiefs complained that Sanders' agent, Steve Weinberg, had accepted a deal with the Chiefs in principle.

==== 2014 season ====
Sanders was signed to replace Eric Decker, who departed for the New York Jets in free agency. Head coach John Fox named him the starting outside wide receiver alongside Demaryius Thomas and Wes Welker in the slot.

Sanders started in the Broncos' season-opener against the Indianapolis Colts and recorded six receptions for 77 yards in a 31–24 victory. In Week 3, Sanders caught a season-high 11 passes for 149 receiving yards in the Broncos' 26–20 overtime loss at the Seattle Seahawks. On October 19, 2014, Sanders caught three passes for 41 yards along with his first touchdown as a Bronco as they defeated the San Francisco 49ers 42–17. The following week, Sanders caught nine passes for 120 yards and a career-high three touchdown receptions in the Broncos' 35–21 win against the San Diego Chargers. On November 16, 2014, he suffered a concussion after being hit by Rams safety Rodney McLeod during the Broncos' 22–7 loss against the St. Louis Rams. In Week 9, Sanders made ten receptions for a season-high 151 receiving yards during a 43–21 loss at the New England Patriots.

Sanders finished the 2014 season with a career-high in receptions (101), receiving yards (1,404), and touchdowns (nine) and started all 16 games. As a result of his successful 2014 season, Sanders made his first career Pro Bowl.

The Broncos finished atop the AFC West with a 12–4 record and received a first-round bye. On January 11, 2015, Sanders started his first NFL playoff game and caught seven passes for 46 yards as the Broncos lost 24–13 to the Indianapolis Colts in the AFC Divisional Round.

==== 2015 season ====
On January 12, 2015, the Denver Broncos and head coach John Fox agreed to mutually part ways, concluding Sanders's one and only season under Fox and offensive coordinator Adam Gase. On January 19, 2015, Denver Broncos' General manager John Elway announced the hiring of Baltimore Ravens' offensive coordinator Gary Kubiak as the Broncos' new head coach.

Offensive coordinator Rick Dennison named Sanders and Demaryius Thomas as the starting wide receivers to begin the regular season. Sanders was inactive for the Broncos' Week 11 victory at the Chicago Bears due to an ankle injury. On December 20, 2015, Sanders made ten catches for a career-high 181 receiving yards and a touchdown in a 34–27 loss to his former team, the Pittsburgh Steelers.

Sanders finished the 2015 season with 76 receptions, 1,135 receiving yards, and six touchdowns in 15 games and 15 starts. This was also his only season as the Broncos' backup punt returner, as he finished with 17 punt returns for 103 return yards. Pro Football Focus gave Sanders an overall grade of 86.2, with his grade ranking 13th among all wide receivers.

The Broncos finished atop the AFC West with 12–4 and were the No. 1 seed in the AFC heading into the playoffs with a first-round bye. On January 17, 2016, Sanders started in the AFC Divisional Round and recorded five receptions for 85 yards during the Broncos' 23–16 victory over the Pittsburgh Steelers. The following week, the Broncos defeated the New England Patriots in the AFC Championship by a score of 20–18. On February 7, 2016, Sanders led all receivers in both teams with six receptions for 83 yards as the Broncos defeated the Carolina Panthers by a score of 24–10 to win Super Bowl 50. He was ranked 74th by his fellow players on the NFL Top 100 Players of 2016.

==== 2016 season ====
On September 7, 2016, the Broncos signed Sanders to a three-year, $33 million contract extension that included $20 million guaranteed and a signing bonus of $10.75 million.

The off-season saw the retirement of Peyton Manning and the departure of Brock Osweiler in free agency. Sanders and Thomas remained the starting wide receiver duo with Trevor Siemian as their new quarterback. In Week 3, he caught nine passes for 117 receiving yards and two touchdowns during the Broncos' 29–17 victory at the Cincinnati Bengals. On November 27, 2016, Sanders recorded seven catches for a season-high 172 receiving yards and a touchdown as the Broncos were defeated 30–27 by the Kansas City Chiefs. On December 11, 2016, he collected a season-high 11 receptions for 100 yards and a touchdown in their 13–10 loss at the Tennessee Titans.

Sanders finished the 2016 season with 79 receptions, 1,032 receiving yards, and five touchdowns in 16 games and 16 starts. This marked his third consecutive season with over 1,000 receiving yards. The Broncos finished third in the AFC West with a 9–7 record and did not qualify for the playoffs. He earned a second Pro Bowl nomination.

==== 2017 season ====
On January 2, 2017, head coach Gary Kubiak announced his retirement due to health concerns. New head coach Vance Joseph retained Sanders and Demaryius Thomas as the starting wide receivers to begin the regular season.

On September 17, 2017, Sanders had six receptions for 62 yards and a season-high two touchdowns in the 42–17 Week 2 victory against the Dallas Cowboys. The following week, he caught a season-high seven passes for 75 receiving yards as the Broncos lost 26–16 at the Buffalo Bills. He sprained his ankle during the third quarter of the Broncos' Week 6 loss to the New York Giants and missed the next two games (Weeks 7–8). In Week 10, Sanders caught six passes for a season-high 137 receiving yards during a 41–16 loss to the New England Patriots. He was sidelined for the last two games of the season (Weeks 16–17) after sustaining another injury to his ankle.

Sanders finished the 2017 season with 47 receptions for 555 yards and two touchdowns in 12 games and 11 starts. In his single season under offensive coordinator Mike McCoy, Sanders experienced career lows since arriving in Denver.

==== 2018 season ====
Sanders started the season off strong with 10 receptions for 135 yards and a touchdown in a victory over the Seattle Seahawks. In Week 6, against the Los Angeles Rams, he had seven receptions for 115 yards and a touchdown. In Week 7, on Thursday Night Football, Sanders threw a touchdown pass to Courtland Sutton and recorded six catches for 102 yards, including a 64-yard touchdown pass from Case Keenum, in a 45–10 win over the Arizona Cardinals, earning him AFC Offensive Player of the Week. On December 5, Sanders suffered a torn Achilles in practice, ending his season. Overall, Sanders finished the 2018 season with 71 receptions for 868 receiving yards and four touchdowns.

==== 2019 season ====
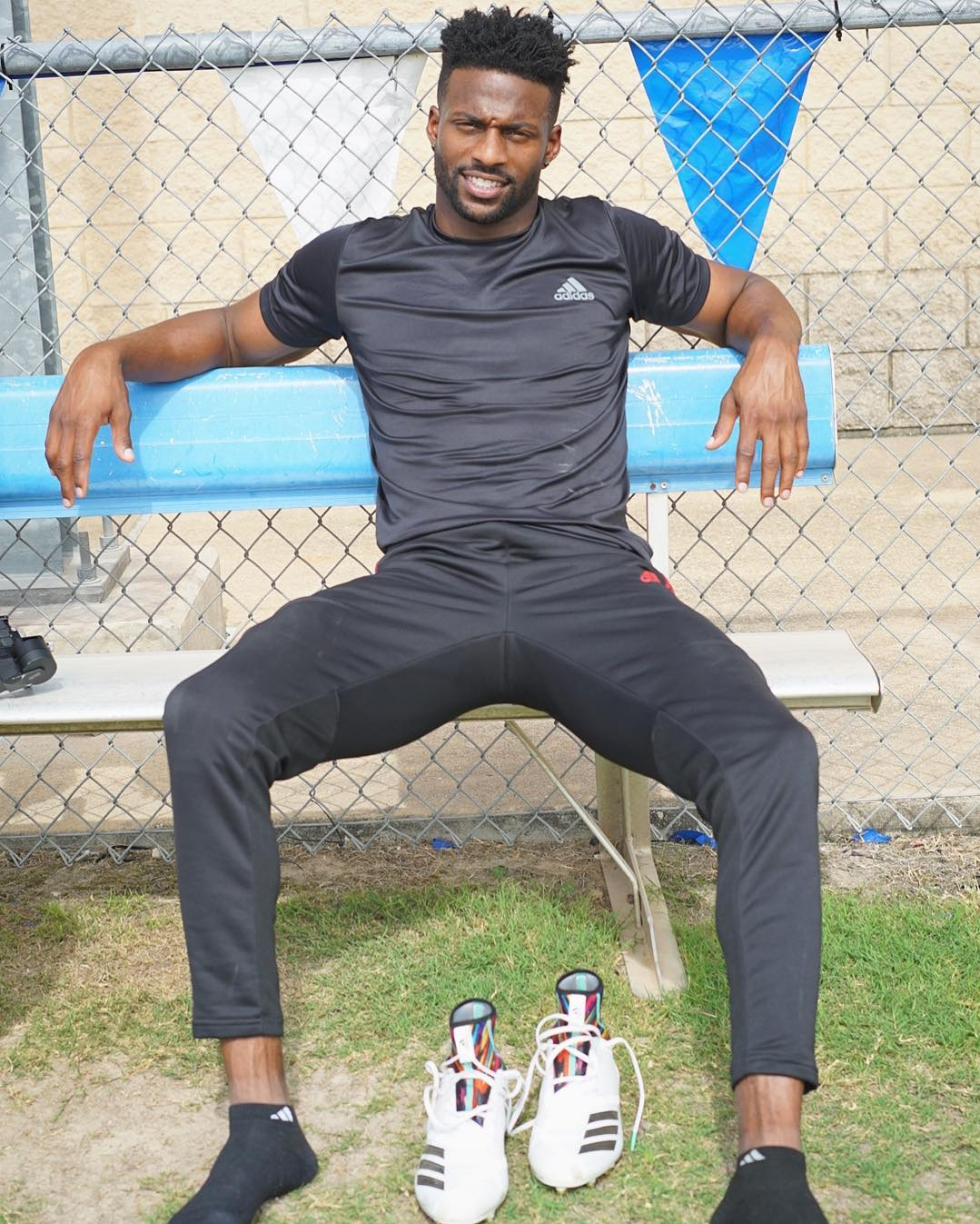
Sanders in 2018

Sanders returned from injury in time for the season-opener against the Oakland Raiders on Monday Night Football. In the game, Sanders caught five passes for 86 yards and his first touchdown of the season in the 24–16 road loss. In the next game against the Chicago Bears, Sanders caught 11 passes for 98 yards and a touchdown along with a two-point conversion as the Broncos lost 16–14.

=== San Francisco 49ers ===
On October 22, 2019, Sanders was traded to the San Francisco 49ers along with a 2020 fifth-round pick in exchange for 2020 third- and fourth-round picks.

Sanders made his 49ers debut during Week 8 against the Carolina Panthers. In that game, he caught four passes for 25 yards and a touchdown in the 51–13 victory. In the next game against the Arizona Cardinals, he finished with seven catches for 112 receiving yards and a touchdown as the 49ers won 28–25. During Week 14 against the New Orleans Saints, Sanders completed a pass to Raheem Mostert for a 35-yard touchdown and caught seven passes for 157 yards and a 75-yard touchdown in the 48–46 road victory. In Week 16 against the Los Angeles Rams on Saturday Night Football, Sanders caught three passes for 61 yards, including a 46-yard reception which set up a game winning field goal during the 34–31 win. In Week 17 against the Seattle Seahawks, Sanders became the first player to catch a pass in 17 games in a season, since he was traded by the Broncos before their bye week and after the 49ers' bye week. He finished the 2019 season with 66 receptions for 869 receiving yards and five receiving touchdowns. Sanders helped the 49ers reach Super Bowl LIV after defeating the Minnesota Vikings and Green Bay Packers in the playoffs. In the Super Bowl, Sanders recorded three catches for 38 yards, but the 49ers lost 31–20 to the Kansas City Chiefs.

=== New Orleans Saints ===
On April 6, 2020, Sanders signed a two-year, $16 million contract with earnings up to $19 million with the New Orleans Saints.

In Week 5 against the Los Angeles Chargers on Monday Night Football, Sanders recorded a career-high 12 receptions for 122 yards during the 30–27 overtime win. He was placed on the reserve/COVID-19 list by the team on October 23, and activated on November 4. He finished the 2020 season with 61 receptions for 726 receiving yards and five receiving touchdowns in 14 games and five starts.

On March 16, 2021, Sanders was released by the Saints.

=== Buffalo Bills ===
On March 17, 2021, Sanders signed with the Buffalo Bills.

On April 29, 2021, Sanders changed his number to number 1 following the National Football League uniform numbers rule that had changed earlier that month. He previously wore number 10. During his lone season with Buffalo, Sanders played in 14 games, recording 42 receptions for 626 yards and four touchdowns, while recording an additional three receptions for 52 yards and a touchdown in the Bills' two playoff games.

=== Retirement ===
Sanders announced his retirement on September 7, 2022, as an honorary member of the Broncos who he had won Super Bowl 50 with in 2016 and where he spent most of his career. In his statement he said: "I gave it my all. Every single rep, every single play, I tried to go 100 percent as hard as I can. And that's why I can hang my hat and say I gave the game everything I had, and the game gave it back to me."

== Career statistics ==
=== NFL ===
Legend
	Won the Super Bowl
**Bold**	Career high

==== Regular season ====
Year	Team	Games		Receiving					Rushing					Returning					Passing						Fumbles	
Year	Team	GP	GS	Rec	Yds	Avg	Lng	TD	Att	Yds	Avg	Lng	TD	Ret	Yds	Avg	Lng	TD	Cmp	Att	Pct	Yds	TD	Int	Fum	Lost
2010	PIT	13	1	28	376	13.4	35	2	—	—	—	—	—	**29**	**688**	23.7	48	0	—	—	—	—	—	—	2	1
2011	PIT	11	0	22	288	13.1	32	2	—	—	—	—	—	8	115	14.4	25	0	**1**	**1**	**100.0**	15	0	0	0	0
2012	PIT	**16**	7	44	626	14.2	37	1	1	4	4.0	4	0	10	120	12.0	**63**	0	—	—	—	—	—	—	**3**	**2**
2013	PIT	**16**	10	67	740	11.0	55T	6	1	25	**25.0**	25	0	10	268	**26.8**	46	0	—	—	—	—	—	—	1	0
2014	DEN	**16**	**16**	**101**	**1,404**	13.9	48	**9**	**8**	44	5.5	13	0	4	65	16.3	22	0	—	—	—	—	—	—	1	0
2015	DEN	15	15	76	1,135	**14.9**	**75T**	6	3	29	9.7	24	0	18	116	6.4	14	0	—	—	—	—	—	—	2	**2**
2016	DEN	**16**	**16**	79	1,032	13.1	64	5	1	4	4.0	4	0	—	—	—	—	—	—	—	—	—	—	—	1	0
2017	DEN	12	11	47	555	11.8	38	2	—	—	—	—	—	2	−2	−1.0	3	0	—	—	—	—	—	—	0	0
2018	DEN	12	12	71	868	12.2	64T	4	4	**53**	13.3	**35T**	**1**	—	—	—	—	—	**1**	**1**	**100.0**	28	**1**	0	1	0
2019	DEN	7	7	30	367	12.2	53	2	—	—	—	—	—	—	—	—	—	—	—	—	—	—	—	—	0	0
2019	SF	9	8	36	502	13.9	**75T**	3	—	—	—	—	—	—	—	—	—	—	**1**	**1**	**100.0**	**35**	**1**	0	0	0
2020	NO	14	5	61	726	11.9	51	5	1	12	12.0	12	0	—	—	—	—	—	—	—	—	—	—	—	1	0
2021	BUF	14	13	42	626	14.9	41	4	2	31	15.5	24	0	—	—	—	—	—	—	—	—	—	—	—	0	0
Total		172	122	704	9,245	13.1	75T	51	21	202	9.6	35T	1	81	1,370	16.9	63	0	3	3	100.0	78	2	0	12	5

==== Postseason ====
Year	Team	Games		Receiving					Rushing					Fumbles	
Year	Team	GP	GS	Rec	Yds	Avg	Lng	TD	Att	Yds	Avg	Lng	TD	Fum	Lost
2010	PIT	3	0	7	91	13.0	20	0	—	—	—	—	—	0	0
2011	PIT	1	0	6	81	13.5	18	0	—	—	—	—	—	0	0
2014	DEN	1	1	7	46	6.6	17	0	—	—	—	—	—	0	0
2015	DEN	**3**	**3**	**16**	**230**	14.4	**34**	0	—	—	—	—	—	0	0
2019	SF	**3**	**3**	5	71	14.2	22	0	—	—	—	—	—	0	0
2020	NO	2	1	8	51	6.4	16	0	—	—	—	—	—	0	0
2021	BUF	2	2	3	52	**17.3**	**34**	**1**	—	—	—	—	—	0	0
Total		15	10	52	622	12.0	34	1	0	0	0.0	0	0	0	0

=== College ===
Season	Team	GP	Receiving		
Season	Team	GP	Rec	Yards	TD
2005	SMU	Redshirt			
2006	SMU	12	46	605	9
2007	SMU	12	74	889	9
2008	SMU	10	67	958	9
2009	SMU	13	98	1,339	7
Total		47	285	3,791	34

== Post-playing career ==
On September 21, 2022, it was announced that Sanders would join the NFL Network as an analyst. He made his debut on NFL GameDay Morning on September 25, 2022. He also appears regularly on various NFL network programs and across NFL Media's podcast lineup.

== Personal life ==
Sanders' mother, Stephanie Sanders, died at age 41 in 2011. He has two younger sisters.

In 2013, Sanders married Gabriella Waheed. Together, they have two children, Princeton (born 2014) and Zoie (born 2016).
