= Kyle Padron =

American football player (born 1991)

No. 2
- Position: Quarterback

Personal information
- Born: March 27, 1991 (age 35); San Antonio, Texas, U.S.
- Listed height: 6 ft 4 in (1.93 m)
- Listed weight: 220 lb (100 kg)

Career information
- High school: Southlake Carroll (Southlake, Texas)
- College: SMU; Eastern Washington
- NFL draft: 2013: undrafted

Career history
- Oakland Raiders (2013)*; Bemidji Axemen (2014)*
- * Offseason or practice squad member only

Kyle Padron (born March 27, 1991) is an American former football quarterback. He played college football for the Eastern Washington Eagles and the SMU Mustangs.

== Early life ==
Padron graduated from Carroll Senior High School in Southlake, Texas in 2009. He played in just five games as a senior in 2008 before breaking his throwing hand. He passed for 1,550 yards and 18 touchdowns with only three interceptions, while completing 129-of-193 (66.8 percent) of his passes. He also rushed for 297 yards and six scores as a senior. The Carroll Dragons were 5–1 in the six games he played his senior season, finishing 8–3 overall. Padron was rated as a two-star prospect according to Rivals.com and Scout.com, and ranked No. 95 on the Dallas Morning News All-Area list.

== College career ==
=== SMU ===
In his 21 games as a starter at SMU, Padron led the Mustangs to a 12–9 record – 5–1 as a freshman, 7–7 as a sophomore and 0–1 as a junior. Padron ended his SMU career with the school's career record for passing efficiency (142.0 rating) and average total offense per game (259.9). He completed 61.2 percent of his passes (446-of-729) and was intercepted 21 times. His 5,902 career passing yards ranks fourth in school history (Mitchell is seventh with 4,590), and his eight 300-yard passing performances are tied for the school record.

Padron took over the starting quarterback job at SMU in the eighth game of his freshman season in 2009, replacing Bo Levi Mitchell, who also transferred to Eastern Washington in 2010. Padron led the Mustangs to wins in five of their last six games to earn a spot on the Conference USA All-Freshman Team. Padron helped lead the Mustangs to their first bowl game since receiving the death penalty. He earned MVP honors at the 2009 Hawaii Bowl after passing for a school-record 460 yards and two touchdowns in SMU's 45–10 win over Nevada. In 2011, Padron was named to the Hawaii Bowl's Ten Year Anniversary Team for his outstanding performance in the game.

As a sophomore in 2010, Padron started all 14 games at quarterback, earning honorable mention All-Conference USA honors. He set SMU records for passing yards (3,828), total yards (4,072), touchdowns (31), completions (302) and attempts (508), and had the seventh-best passing efficiency rating (137.4) in school history. Padron led the Mustangs to their second straight bowl game, a 16–14 loss in the Armed Forces Bowl against Army. Padron completed 23-of-34 passes (67.6 percent) for 302 yards and two touchdowns in the bowl game.

As a junior in 2011, Padron played in three games, including the team's season opener at Texas A&M. He finished the year with 152 yards passing yards on nine completions, and one rushing touchdown. Padron was benched after a poor showing in the season opener and did not start another game for the Mustangs in 2011. Padron also suffered a herniated disc while lifting weights during the course of the season. In January 2012, Padron was granted a release from his scholarship at SMU.

=== Eastern Washington ===
In March 2012, Padron announced his transfer to Eastern Washington, where he would be attempting to replace graduating quarterback Bo Levi Mitchell, whom he had replaced at SMU back in 2009. In late August 2012, Padron was officially named the starter for Eastern Washington for the 2012 season opening game.

Padron split time in 2012 with redshirt freshman quarterback Vernon Adams, starting five games and playing in six others, during the 2012 season. Padron threw for 2,491 yards and 17 touchdowns against 7 interceptions, helping to lead the Eagles to a semifinal appearance in the FCS Playoffs.

== Professional career ==
On January 9, 2013, it was announced that Padron had declared himself to be eligible for the 2013 NFL draft, electing not to return for his final season of eligibility at Eastern Washington.

On April 27, 2013, Padron signed as an undrafted free agent with the Oakland Raiders. On May 22, 2013, Padron was waived by the Raiders when Padron was unable to participate in offseason workouts because of an NFL rule regarding participation prior to graduating.

On November 20, 2013, Padron signed with the Bemidji Axemen of the Indoor Football League. Padron asked to be released to pursue other options.

== Personal life ==
Padron has two older brothers, Justin and Matt, who both played college football at University of North Texas and the University of Arizona, Texas State respectively. He currently co-hosts the QB Chronicles Podcast with fellow former SMU QB Garrett Gilbert on YouTube on the On The Poney Express - SMU Mustangs channel.
