= Cole Beasley =

American football player (born 1989)

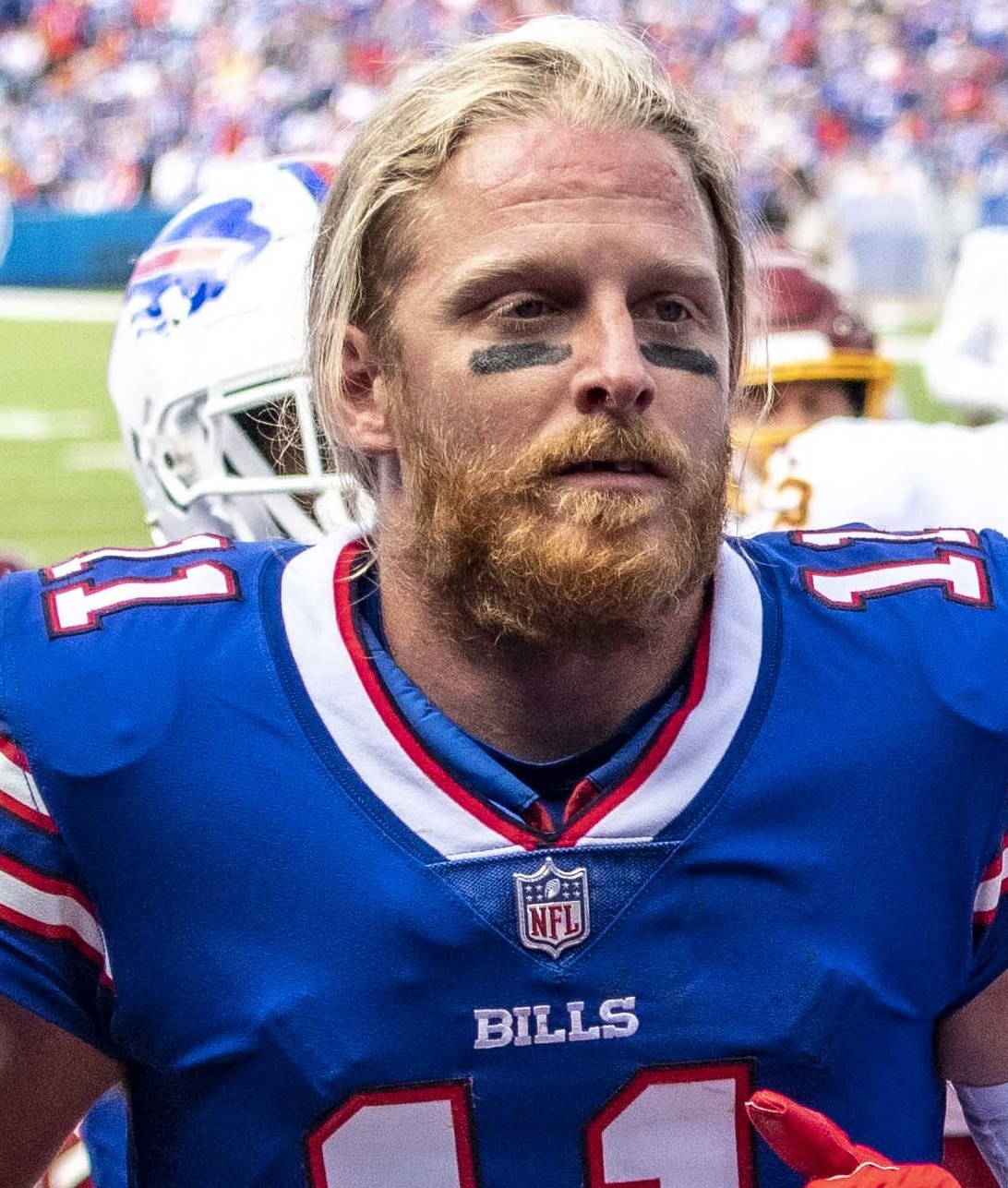
- Beasley with the Buffalo Bills in 2021

No. 11, 10, 15
- Position: Wide receiver

Personal information
- Born: April 26, 1989 (age 37); Houston, Texas, U.S.
- Listed height: 5 ft 8 in (1.73 m)
- Listed weight: 174 lb (79 kg)

Career information
- High school: Little Elm (Little Elm, Texas)
- College: SMU (2008–2011)
- NFL draft: 2012: undrafted

Career history
- Dallas Cowboys (2012–2018); Buffalo Bills (2019–2021); Tampa Bay Buccaneers (2022); Buffalo Bills (2022); New York Giants (2023)*
- * Offseason or practice squad member only

Awards and highlights
- Second-team All-Pro (2020); First-team All-C-USA (2011); Second-team All-C-USA (2010)

Career NFL statistics
- Receptions: 556
- Receiving yards: 5,744
- Receiving touchdowns: 34
- Stats at Pro Football Reference

Cole Dickson Beasley (born April 26, 1989) is an American former professional football player who was a wide receiver in the National Football League (NFL). He played college football for the SMU Mustangs and was signed by the Dallas Cowboys as an undrafted free agent in 2012. Beasley also played three seasons for the Buffalo Bills before retiring with the Tampa Bay Buccaneers in 2022. He came out of retirement a few months later in the season to re-sign with the Bills.

== Early life ==
Beasley attended Little Elm High School, where he was an option quarterback, leading the Lobos to the Texas UIL-4A playoffs in consecutive years. Among his teammates at Little Elm was Trevante Rhodes. Beasley was a district co-MVP, posting 1,184 rushing yards, 12 rushing touchdowns, 1,570 passing yards, and 12 touchdowns. He was rated as a two-star recruit by Rivals.com.

== College career ==
Beasley accepted a scholarship from Southern Methodist University, where he was converted into a wide receiver, playing in 11 games with seven starts as a freshman, while finishing third on the team with 42 receptions for 366 yards and three touchdowns.

As a sophomore, Beasley started seven games, recording 40 receptions (fourth on the team) for 493 yards and three touchdowns. That season, SMU won the 2009 Hawaii Bowl marking the program's first bowl appearance since receiving the NCAA death penalty.

As a junior, Beasley posted 87 receptions (second for a single-season in school history), 1,060 yards and six touchdowns.

As a senior, Beasley registered 86 receptions for 1,040 yards (second on the team) and two touchdowns.

== Professional career ==
Pre-draft measurables
Height	Weight	Arm length	Hand span	40-yard dash	10-yard split	20-yard split	20-yard shuttle	Three-cone drill	Vertical jump	Broad jump	Bench press
5 ft 7 7/8 in (1.72 m)	175 lb (79 kg)	30 1/8 in (0.77 m)	8 7/8 in (0.23 m)	4.49 s	1.57 s	2.66 s	4.40 s	7.16 s	38 in (0.97 m)	10 ft 6 in (3.20 m)	17 reps
All values from Pro Day

=== Dallas Cowboys ===
==== 2012 season ====
Beasley went undrafted in the 2012 NFL draft due to his size and was signed by his hometown team, the Dallas Cowboys. Beasley left abruptly during training camp, stating he was dealing with "personal stuff", and even considered retiring from professional football. Beasley went on to have a sudden change of heart, returning and making the final 53-man roster.

Beasley finished his rookie year with 15 receptions for 128 yards in 10 games and no starts.

==== 2013 season ====
Beasley found ways to be productive while being surrounded by a solid corps of wide receivers, having the highest completion percentage of any receiver in the NFL with more than 10 targets. He was targeted by quarterback Tony Romo on third down, especially in spread formations. Much of this became attributed to Beasley's very good route running.

Beasley finished his second professional season with 39 receptions for 368 yards and two touchdowns to go along with 79 return yards in 14 games and three starts.

==== 2014 season ====
In 2014, Beasley posted 37 receptions (fourth on the team) for 420 yards (fourth on the team) and four touchdowns in 16 games and two starts. He averaged nearly 50 yards per game during the final six contests of the season. During the Wild Card Round against the Detroit Lions, Beasley made four catches – three for first downs- for 63 yards and recovered a fumble in the 24–20 victory.

==== 2015 season ====
On March 3, 2015, the Cowboys signed Beasley for an additional four years, with a total contract value of $13.6 million. With leading receiver Dez Bryant injured for most of the season, Beasley finished with 52 receptions (tied for second on the team) for 537 yards and five touchdowns (led the team), while playing with four different starting quarterbacks with varying degrees of knowledge of the team's offense.

At the beginning of the year Beasley was used to fill in as a punt returner, due to his ball security ability. Beasley was eventually replaced by rookie Lucky Whitehead after having poor return averages and a critical muffed punt in a loss against the New York Giants.

==== 2016 season ====
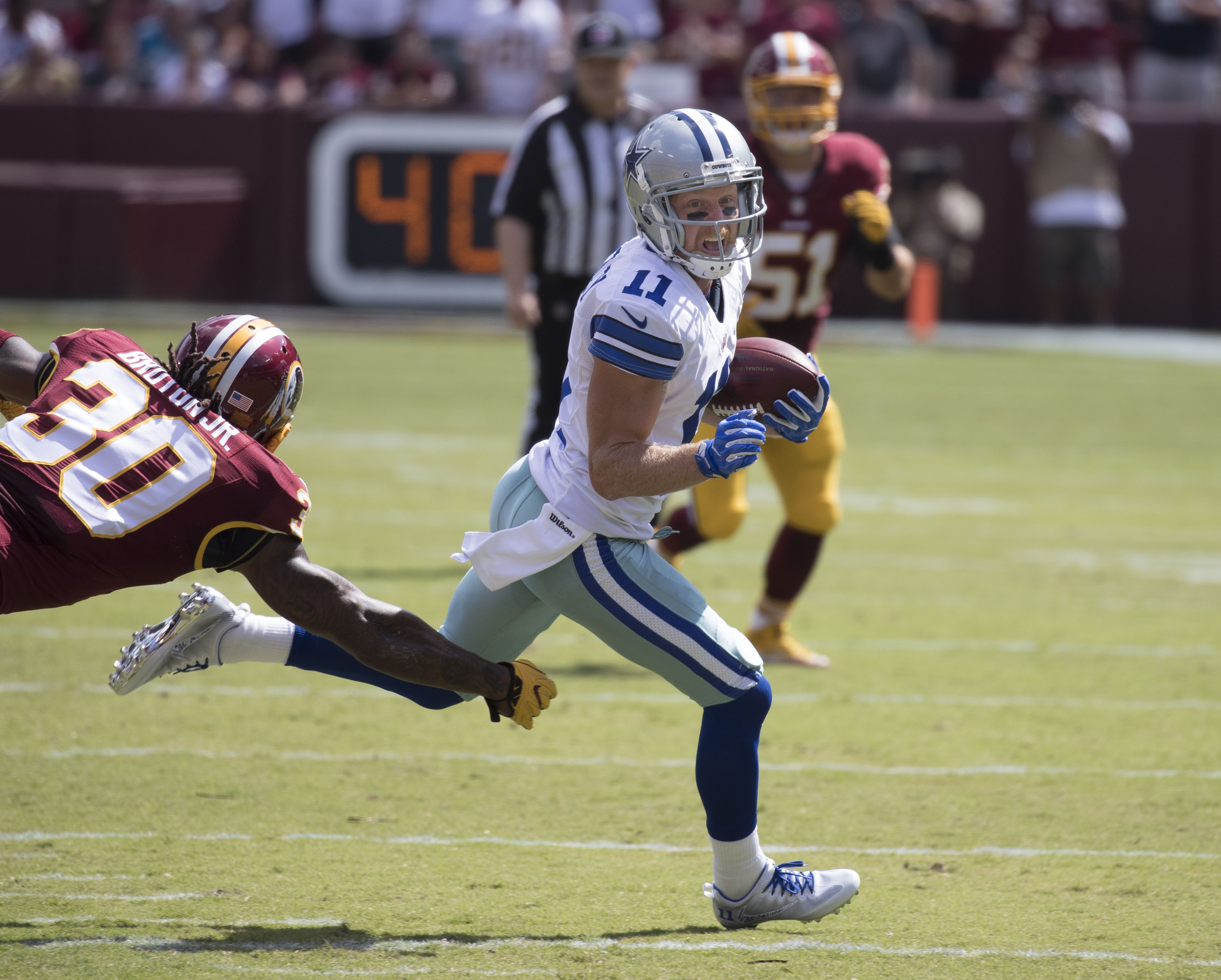
Beasley in 2016

In 2016, Beasley posted career highs in receptions and yards, catching 75 passes for 833 yards and five touchdowns. His 76.5% catch rate ranked second among NFL wide receivers in 2016. In the Divisional Round against the Green Bay Packers, Beasley had four receptions for 45 yards and had eight return yards during the 34–31 loss.

==== 2017 season ====
In the 2017 season, Beasley finished with 36 receptions for 314 yards and four touchdowns.

==== 2018 season ====
Beasley began the 2018 season with seven receptions for 73 yards in a 16–8 road loss to the Carolina Panthers. During Week 6 against the Jacksonville Jaguars, he had nine receptions for 101 yards and two touchdowns in the 40–7 victory. In the regular-season finale against the New York Giants, he caught six passes for 94 yards along with the game-winning touchdown during the narrow 36–35 road victory.

Beasley finished the 2018 season with 65 receptions for 672 yards and three touchdowns in 16 games and four starts. The Cowboys finished atop the NFC East with a 10–6 record and earned the #4-seed in the NFC Playoffs. In the Wild Card Round against the Seattle Seahawks, Beasley recorded three receptions for 28 yards during the narrow 24–22 victory. During the Divisional Round against the Los Angeles Rams, he had a 15-yard reception in the 30–22 road loss.

=== Buffalo Bills (first stint) ===
==== 2019 season ====
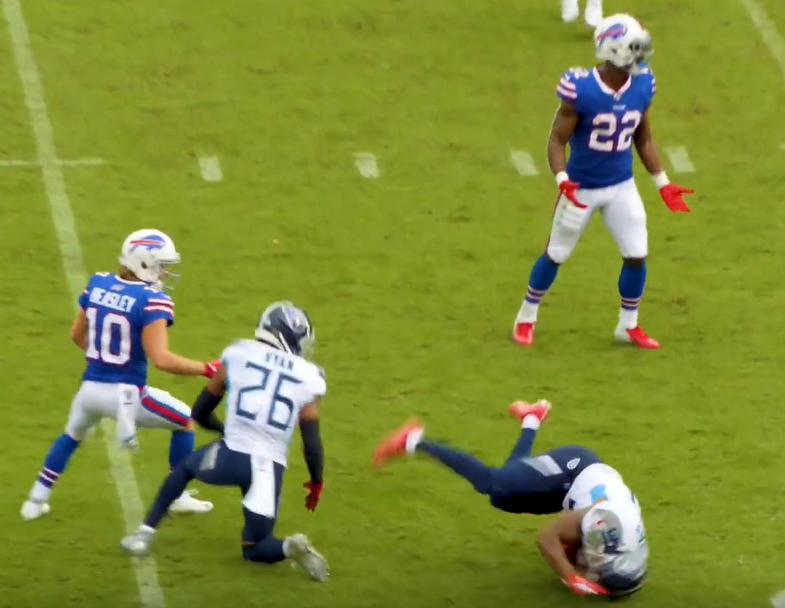
Beasley in a game against the Tennessee Titans

On March 13, 2019, Beasley signed a four-year, $29 million contract with the Buffalo Bills.

Beasley caught his first touchdown with the Bills in a 31–21 Week 6 victory over the Miami Dolphins. Against the Dallas Cowboys, his former team, on Thanksgiving Day in Week 13, Beasley finished with six receptions for 110 yards and a touchdown as the Bills won on the road by a score of 26–15. Three weeks later against the New England Patriots, Beasley caught seven passes for 108 yards during the 24–17 road loss.

Beasley finished the 2019 season with 67 receptions for 778 yards and six touchdowns. In the Wild Card Round against the Houston Texans, he had four receptions for 44 yards during the 22–19 overtime road loss.

==== 2020 season ====
Beasley was placed on the active/non-football injury list at the start of training camp on July 29, 2020. He was moved back to the active roster on August 12.

During a Week 3 35–32 victory over the Los Angeles Rams, Beasley had six receptions for 100 yards. During Week 7 against the New York Jets, he had 11 receptions for 112 yards in the 18–10 road victory. Three weeks later against the Arizona Cardinals, he had 11 receptions for 109 yards and a touchdown during the 32–30 road loss. During Week 12 against the Los Angeles Chargers, Beasley threw a touchdown pass to fellow wide receiver Gabe Davis on a trick play in the 27–17 victory.

During Week 13 against the San Francisco 49ers on Monday Night Football, Beasley recorded nine catches for 130 yards and a touchdown during the 34–24 road victory. Two weeks later against the Denver Broncos, he recorded eight catches for 112 yards during the 48–19 road victory. Beasley did not play in the regular-season finale against the Miami Dolphins due to a knee injury.

After setting career-highs with 82 catches and 967 yards, Beasley was named second-team All-Pro. He also scored four touchdowns.

In the Wild Card Round game against the Indianapolis Colts, Beasley caught seven passes for 57 yards during the a 27–24 victory. His seven catches led the team and was a career-high for a playoff game. During the AFC Championship Game against the Kansas City Chiefs, Beasley recorded seven catches for 88 yards during the 38–24 road loss. After the season, Beasley revealed he had played through the 2020 playoffs with a partially broken fibula. He was ranked 96th by his fellow players on the NFL Top 100 Players of 2021.

==== 2021 season ====
On August 24, 2021, Beasley was placed in a COVID-19 safety protocol.

During Week 6 against the Tennessee Titans, Beasley caught seven passes for 88 yards and his first touchdown of the season in the narrow 34–31 road loss. On December 21, 2021, he was placed on the reserve/COVID-19 list after testing positive for the virus. Beasley finished the 2021 season with 82 receptions for 693 yards and a touchdown.

During the 2022 offseason, Beasley was given permission to seek a trade outside Buffalo. He was released on March 17, 2022.

=== Tampa Bay Buccaneers ===
On September 21, 2022, Beasley was signed to the Tampa Bay Buccaneers practice squad. Three days later, Beasley was elevated to the active roster for a game against the Green Bay Packers before being demoted back to the practice squad on September 26. He was elevated to the active roster five days later.

On October 5, Beasley announced his retirement.

=== Buffalo Bills (second stint) ===
On December 13, 2022, Beasley came out of retirement and re-signed with the Bills' practice squad. He played in two regular season games with the Bills in the 2022 season. On January 12, 2023, Beasley was signed to the 53-man active roster.

In the Wild Card Round against the Miami Dolphins, Beasley had his first postseason receiving touchdown during the 34–31 victory.

=== New York Giants ===
On July 21, 2023, Beasley signed with the New York Giants. He was released on August 29, and re-signed to the practice squad. On October 20, it was announced that the Giants released Beasley from their practice squad at his request.

== Career statistics ==
=== NFL ===
Legend
**Bold**	Career high

==== Regular season ====
Year	Team	Games		Receiving					Rushing					Returning					Fumbles	
Year	Team	GP	GS	Rec	Yds	Y/R	Lng	TD	Att	Yds	Y/A	Lng	TD	Ret	Yds	Y/R	Lng	TD	Fum	Lost
2012	DAL	10	0	15	128	8.5	20	0	0	0	—	0	0	0	0	—	0	0	0	0
2013	DAL	14	3	39	368	9.4	23	2	0	0	—	0	0	11	**79**	7.2	14	0	1	0
2014	DAL	**16**	2	37	420	11.4	45	4	0	0	—	0	0	0	0	—	0	0	**2**	**2**
2015	DAL	**16**	3	52	536	10.3	30	5	0	0	—	0	0	**12**	69	5.8	**22**	0	**2**	**2**
2016	DAL	**16**	6	75	833	11.1	47	5	**1**	**7**	**7.0**	**7**	0	0	0	—	0	0	0	0
2017	DAL	15	4	36	314	8.7	**54**	4	0	0	—	0	0	2	19	**9.5**	15	0	0	0
2018	DAL	**16**	4	65	672	10.3	32	3	0	0	—	0	0	**12**	69	5.8	14	0	0	0
2019	BUF	15	**10**	67	778	11.6	51	**6**	0	0	—	0	0	0	0	—	0	0	0	0
2020	BUF	15	**10**	**82**	**967**	**11.8**	35	4	0	0	—	0	0	0	0	—	0	0	0	0
2021	BUF	**16**	8	**82**	693	8.5	29	1	0	0	—	0	0	0	0	—	0	0	1	0
2022	TB	2	0	4	17	4.3	5	0	0	0	—	0	0	0	0	—	0	0	0	0
2022	BUF	2	1	2	18	9.0	9	0	0	0	—	0	0	0	0	—	0	0	0	0
Career		153	51	556	5,744	10.3	54	34	1	7	7.0	7	0	40	239	6.0	22	0	6	4

==== Postseason ====
Year	Team	Games		Receiving					Rushing					Returning					Fumbles	
Year	Team	GP	GS	Rec	Yds	Y/R	Lng	TD	Att	Yds	Y/A	Lng	TD	Ret	Yds	Y/R	Lng	TD	Fum	Lost
2014	DAL	2	0	7	101	**14.4**	19	0	0	0	—	0	0	0	0	—	0	0	0	0
2016	DAL	1	0	4	45	11.3	18	0	0	0	—	0	0	**1**	**8**	**8.0**	**8**	0	0	0
2018	DAL	2	0	4	43	10.8	15	0	0	0	—	0	0	**1**	7	7.0	7	0	0	0
2019	BUF	1	1	4	44	11.0	21	0	0	0	—	0	0	0	0	—	0	0	0	0
2020	BUF	**3**	**2**	**14**	**145**	10.4	23	0	0	0	—	0	0	0	0	—	0	0	0	0
2021	BUF	2	0	7	79	11.3	24	0	0	0	—	0	0	0	0	—	0	0	0	0
2022	BUF	2	0	5	68	13.6	**29**	**1**	0	0	—	0	0	0	0	—	0	0	0	0
Career		13	3	45	525	11.7	29	1	0	0	—	0	0	2	15	7.5	8	0	0	0

=== College ===
Season	Team	Conf	Class	Pos	GP	Rec	Yds	Avg	TD
2008	SMU	CUSA	FR	WR	11	42	366	8.7	3
2009	SMU	CUSA	SO	WR	12	40	493	12.3	3
2010	SMU	CUSA	JR	WR	14	87	1,060	12.2	6
2011	SMU	CUSA	SR	WR	12	86	1,040	12.1	2
Career					49	255	2,959	11.6	14

== Music career ==
Beasley released the debut single "80 Stings" in 2017. In 2018, he released his debut album The Autobiography produced by Victor "Phazz" Clark. The two teamed up to form ColdNation Records, an independent record label located in Frisco, Texas. Beasley released a new single called "Sometimes" in January 2020.

== Controversies ==
In June 2021, Beasley announced on social media that while he understood the NFL's interest in players getting the COVID-19 vaccine, he would forgo it nonetheless, even if it meant that he would have to end his playing career as a result. Beasley initially claimed he would stop discussing the issue publicly out of a desire to not be a "distraction" to his team. He then entered a public argument with Mark Cuban, who offered to buy Beasley's wife a share in Pfizer stock if Beasley got vaccinated and promoted the vaccine on his social media platforms. Beasley later entered a public back and forth with teammate Jerry Hughes over the NFL's newly implemented vaccine rules.

In August 2021, Beasley was removed from the Bills' facility for close contact with a vaccinated COVID-19 positive staff member. On August 25, Beasley and teammate Isaiah McKenzie were fined $15,000 for violating the NFL's COVID-19 protocol by not wearing masks. Beasley again took to social media to voice his complaints and was poked fun at by his teammate Stefon Diggs who said "15k is a lot of money lol…" to which Beasley responded by saying "Lol not for you." He was placed back on the active roster on August 27. It was on the same day that Beasley publicly displayed a brain tattoo on his Instagram account. Beasley commented of the tattoo that it symbolized his desire for more "free thinking" in the league.

On October 4, 2021, Beasley took to his Twitter account to criticize Bills fans who booed him at games due to his unvaccinated status. Beasley then deactivated his Twitter account the following week. On December 26, ESPN reported that he had "been fined multiple times for COVID-19 protocol violations, reaching a cumulative sum in the range of $100,000."
