= Martin Ward (American football) =

American football player (born 1989)

No. 29
- Position: Running back / special teams

Personal information
- Born: June 5, 1989 (age 37); Jonesboro, Georgia
- Listed height: 5 ft 10 in (1.78 m)
- Listed weight: 221 lb (100 kg)

Career information
- High school: Mount Zion
- College: Marshall

Awards and highlights
- 2009 Little Caesars Pizza Bowl MVP

Martin Ward (born June 5, 1989) is a former Marshall University running back.

== College career ==
After redshirting in the 2008 season, Ward saw limited action in 2009 until starting running back Darius Marshall was injured late in the season. He made the most of two late season starts, finishing with 393 yards rushing and three touchdowns on the year.

Despite sharing Bowl game carries with Marshall, Ward earned MVP honors in the Little Caesars Pizza Bowl win over Ohio by rushing for 75 yards and two touchdowns on only 10 carries in a 21-17 Thundering Herd victory. In 2010, Ward played in 10 games with 96 carries for 345 yards and a touchdown, including a 101-yard performance versus West Virginia University.

In 2011 and 2012, he saw mostly special teams service behind running backs Tron Martinez and Travon Van.

== Post college ==
After playing briefly in the Canadian Football League and Arena Football League, Ward is pursuing his master's degree in Education and mentoring youth. He assists former Marshall offensive lineman Luke Salmons working with the football program at Cabell Midland High School in Ona, West Virginia.
