= 2009 Armed Forces Bowl =

2009 Bell Helicopter Armed Forces Bowl
Houston Cougars	Air Force Falcons
(10–3)	(7–5)
C-USA	Mountain West
20	47
Head coach: Kevin Sumlin	Head coach: Troy Calhoun
AP / Coaches / BCS; NR / 25 / NR	AP / Coaches / BCS; NR / NR / NR
	1	2	3	4	Total
Houston	0	6	14	0	20
Air Force	14	10	10	13	47
- Date: December 31, 2009
- Season: 2009
- Stadium: Amon G. Carter Stadium
- Location: Fort Worth, Texas
- MVP: Asher Clark (Air Force); Tyron Carrier (Houston)
- Referee: Scott McElwee (MAC)
- Attendance: 41,414
- Payout: US$750,000 per team

United States TV coverage
- Network: ESPN
- Announcers: Dave LaMont; J.C. Pearson; Cara Capuano

The 2009 Armed Forces Bowl was the seventh edition of the Armed Forces Bowl, a college football bowl game, and was played at Amon G. Carter Stadium in Fort Worth, Texas. The game started at 12:00 p.m. US EST on Thursday, December 31, 2009. The game was telecast on ESPN and matched the Houston Cougars of Conference USA and the Air Force Falcons of the Mountain West Conference. The game earned a 1.6 rating.

This was the second year in a row that the two teams finished their seasons against each other in the bowl game played on the TCU campus. The Cougars, the Conference USA runner-up after losing to East Carolina in the championship game, beat Air Force 34–28 last year for their first bowl victory since 1980. Air Force played in the Armed Forces Bowl for the third straight season. The Falcons lost 42–36 to California in the 2007 game, which was then their first bowl appearance since 2002. Each team also made their third appearance in the bowl game. The only other meeting between the two schools was in 2008 when the Falcons defeated Houston 31–28 in a game played in front of just 2,546 people at Gerald J. Ford Stadium on the campus of SMU in Dallas, Texas. The game was originally to be a home game for the Cougars but due to Hurricane Ike the game was moved.

The game marked the first time that Houston had entered a bowl game with a national ranking in the Coaches' Poll since the 1979 season.

== Game summary ==
Air Force wore blue home jerseys, and Houston wore home red jerseys with contrasting colors. This was the first bowl game in the 2009 NCAA Division I FBS football season where teams wore contrasting color jerseys, allowed by a new rule this season.

The Falcons ground out 402 yards of rushing offense on their way to their first bowl victory since 2000. Air Force was led by tailbacks, Jared Tew who had 173 yards and two touchdowns and Asher Clark who carried 17 times for 129 yards and two touchdowns. Clark was named the game's MVP. Air Force's defense was just as impressive as the top ranked pass defense in the country held 2009 NCAA leading passer, Case Keenum to 222 yards and only one touchdown while intercepting him six times. Keenum only had six interceptions in the first 12 games of the season.

After Houston was held without a touchdown before halftime, Tyron Carrier returned the opening kickoff of the second half 79 yards for his fourth TD the season. He took the ball near the left sideline, then ran to the middle of the field before shooting through a gap and running untouched to get the Cougars within 24–13. Air Force immediately responded with its first kickoff return for a touchdown since 1985. Jonathan Warzeka fielded the ball and stepped back into the end zone before running 100 yards. Five Houston players got their hands on him, but couldn't get him down. According to STATS, it was only the sixth major college game since 1996 with kickoff return touchdowns on consecutive plays. None of them had been in a bowl game.

The loss for Houston was their ninth of its last 10 bowl games. The Falcons scored a school-record 47 points, the second-most by a service academy in a bowl game. Navy put up 51 in the 2005 Poinsettia Bowl.

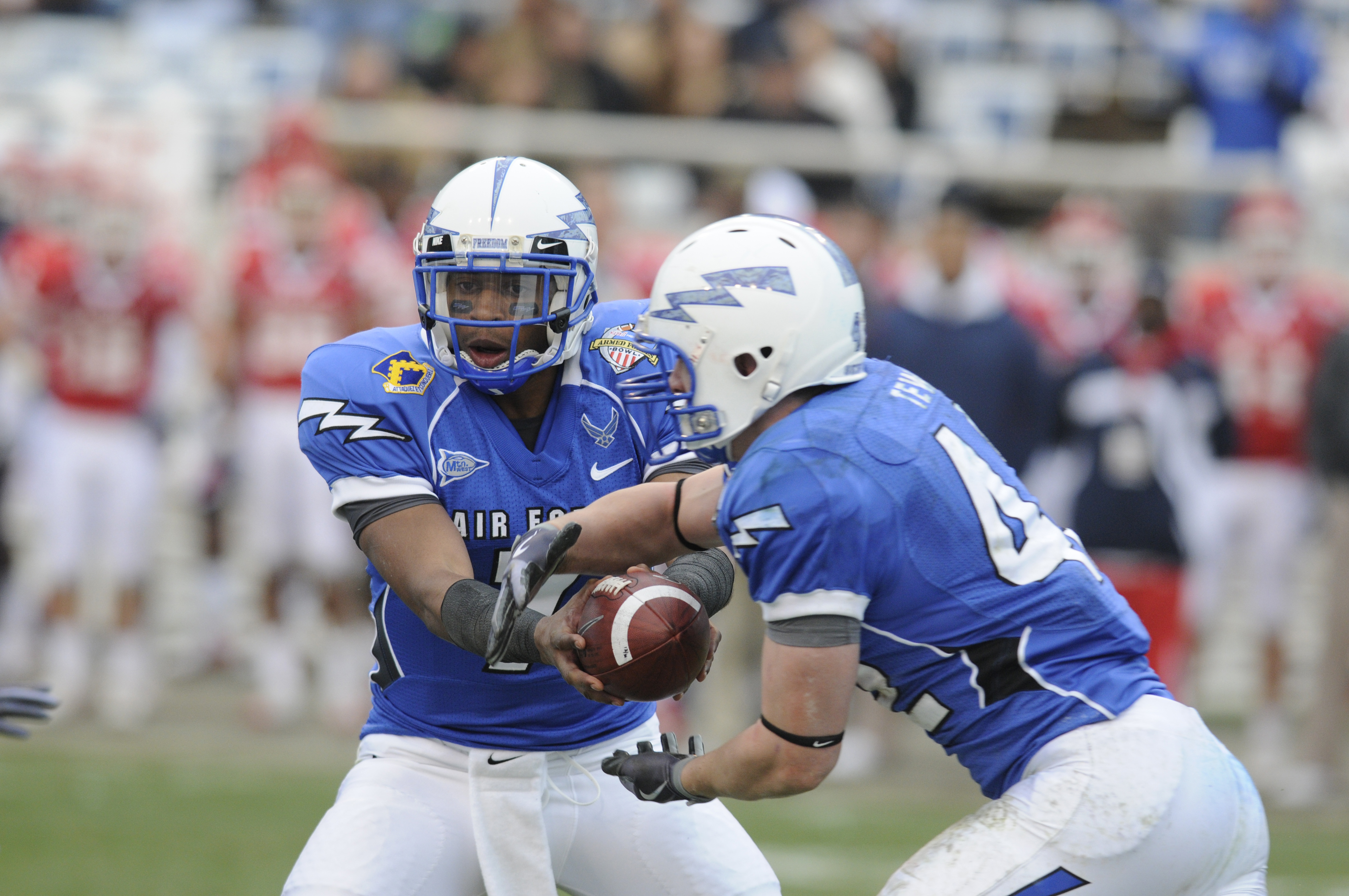
Jared Tew takes a handoff from Tim Jefferson

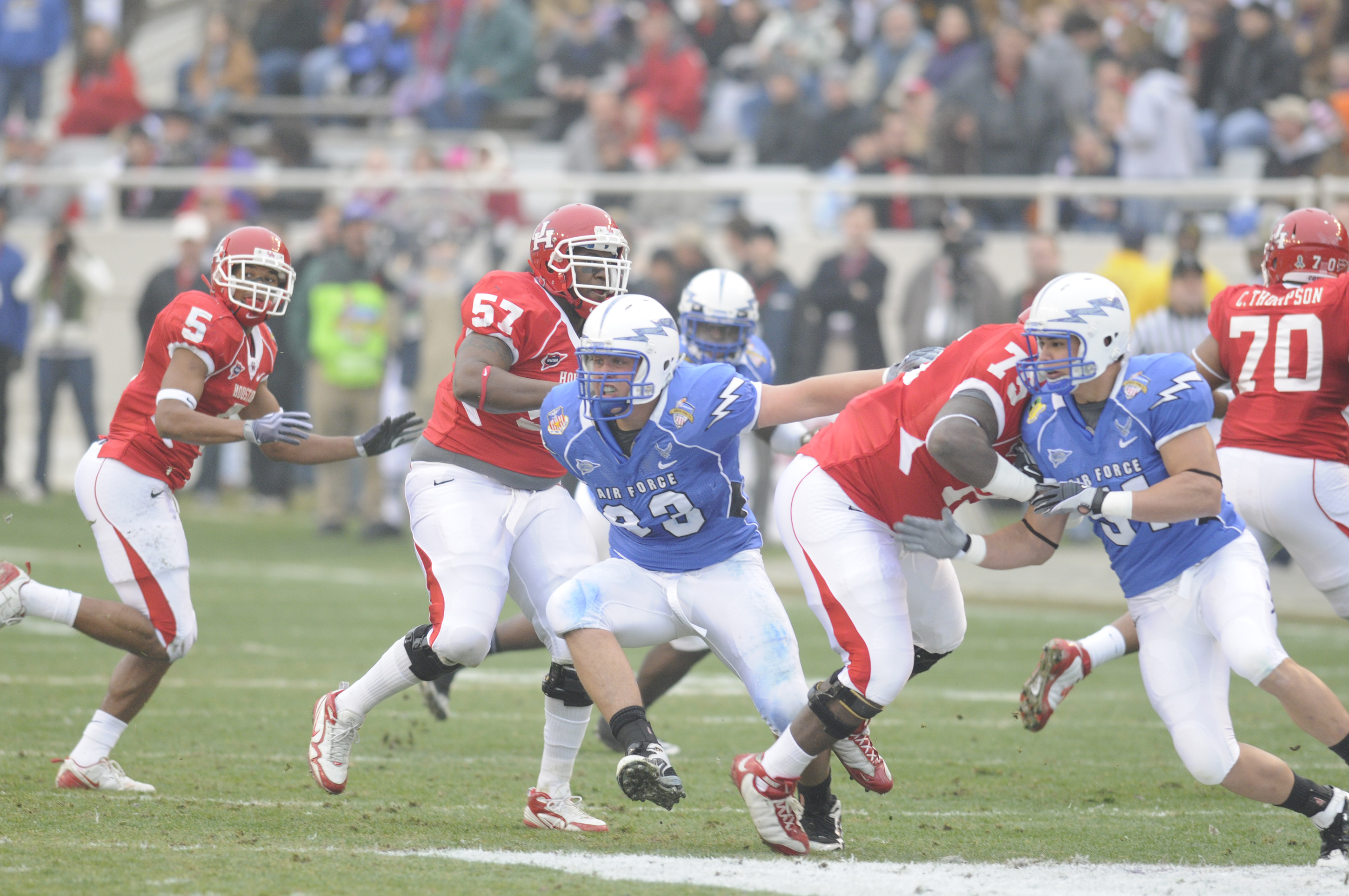
Houston on offense

=== Scoring summary ===
Scoring Play	Score
1st Quarter
AF — Asher Clark 36-yard rush (Erik Soderberg kick), 12:38	AF 7–0
AF — Jared Tew 6-yard rush (Erik Soderberg kick), 8:52	AF 14–0
2nd Quarter
HU — Matt Hogan 33-yard field goal, 14:51	AF 14–3
AF — Asher Clark 22-yard rush (Erik Soderberg kick), 8:55	AF 21–3
HU — Matt Hogan 33-yard field goal, 1:21	AF 21–6
AF — Erik Soderberg 27-yard field goal, 0:00	AF 24–6
3rd Quarter
HU — Tyron Carrier 79-yard kickoff return (Matt Hogan kick), 14:47	AF 24–13
AF — Jonathon Warzeka 100-yard kickoff return (Erik Soderberg kick), 14:29	AF 31–13
HU — Case Keenum 10-yard pass to Patrick Edwards (Matt Hogan kick), 12:48	AF 31–20
AF — Erik Soderberg 27-yard field goal, 7:27	AF 34–20
4th Quarter
AF — Tim Jefferson 1-yard rush (Erik Soderberg kick), 14:04	AF 41–20
AF — Jared Tew 71-yard rush (Erik Soderberg kick missed), 3:32	AF 47–20
