= 2009 Houston Cougars football team =

American college football season

2009 Houston Cougars football

C-USA West Division co-champion

C-USA Championship Game, L 32–38 vs. East Carolina

Armed Forces Bowl, L 20–47 vs. Air Force
- Conference: Conference USA
- West
- Record: 10–4 (6–2 C-USA)
- Head coach: Kevin Sumlin (2nd season)
- Offensive coordinator: Dana Holgorsen (2nd season)
- Offensive scheme: Spread
- Defensive coordinator: John Skladany (2nd season)
- Base defense: 4–3
- Home stadium: Robertson Stadium (Capacity: 32,000)

2009 Conference USA football standings
	Conf.			Overall
Team	W		L	W		L
East Division
East Carolina x$	7	–	1	9	–	5
UCF	6	–	2	8	–	5
Southern Miss	5	–	3	7	–	6
Marshall	4	–	4	7	–	6
UAB	4	–	4	5	–	7
Memphis	1	–	7	2	–	10
West Division
Houston xy	6	–	2	10	–	4
SMU x	6	–	2	8	–	5
Tulsa	3	–	5	5	–	7
UTEP	3	–	5	4	–	8
Rice	2	–	6	2	–	10
Tulane	1	–	7	3	–	9
Championship: East Carolina 38, Houston 32
$ – Conference champion; x – Division champion/co-champions; y – Championship game participant; Rankings from AP Poll

The 2009 Houston Cougars football team, also known as the Houston Cougars, Houston, or UH, represented the University of Houston in the 2009 NCAA Division I FBS football season. It was the 64th year of season play for Houston. The team was coached by second year head football coach, Kevin Sumlin. The team played its home games at Robertson Stadium, a 32,000-seat stadium on campus in Houston. The Cougars finished the season 10–4, 6–3 in CUSA play, were co–champions of the west division and lost to East Carolina 38–32 in the CUSA Championship Game. They were invited to the Armed Forces Bowl where they lost to Air Force 47–20. It was the second consecutive year that they had played Air Force in the Armed Forces Bowl.

== Preseason ==
=== Spring practices ===
The Cougars held Spring practices from March 24 to April 18, 2008. On April 4, the team played a public scrimmage. The Cougars' annual Red-White Game, which was the conclusion of the Spring practices, was abruptly halted after the first ten minutes of gameplay due to rainy weather conditions.

=== Recruiting ===
College recruiting information (2009)
Name	Hometown	School	Height	Weight	40^{‡}	Commit date
George Bamfo; LB	Rockwall, Texas	Rockwall-Heath HS	5 ft 11 in (1.80 m)	196 lb (89 kg)	4.59	Jan 29, 2009
George Bamfo; LB	Recruit ratings: Scout: Rivals: (40)					
Thomas Bates; DB	Baytown, Texas	Lee HS	5 ft 11 in (1.80 m)	180 lb (82 kg)	4.43	Mar 14, 2008
Thomas Bates; DB	Recruit ratings: Scout: Rivals: (77)					
Tyrone Campbell; DT	Channelview, Texas	Channelview HS	6 ft 1 in (1.85 m)	266 lb (121 kg)	5.05	Apr 17, 2008
Tyrone Campbell; DT	Recruit ratings: Scout: Rivals: (73)					
Jacky Candy; DB	Coffeyville, Kansas	Coffeyville CC	6 ft 1 in (1.85 m)	198 lb (90 kg)	4.50	Dec 12, 2008
Jacky Candy; DB	Recruit ratings: Scout: Rivals: (N/A)					
Tyler Chambers; ATH	San Antonio, Texas	Mac Arthur HS	6 ft 4 in (1.93 m)	222 lb (101 kg)	4.70	Apr 5, 2008
Tyler Chambers; ATH	Recruit ratings: Scout: Rivals: (78)					
James Cleveland; WR	Athens, Texas	Trinity Valley CC	6 ft 1 in (1.85 m)	200 lb (91 kg)	4.50	Nov 3, 2008
James Cleveland; WR	Recruit ratings: Scout: Rivals: (N/A)					
Ty Cloud; OL	Flower Mound, Texas	Marcus HS	6 ft 4 in (1.93 m)	290 lb (130 kg)	4.95	Dec 22, 2008
Ty Cloud; OL	Recruit ratings: Scout: Rivals: (76)					
Jarve Dean; OL	Coffeyville, Kansas	Coffeyville CC	6 ft 3 in (1.91 m)	325 lb (147 kg)	5.10	Nov 24, 2008
Jarve Dean; OL	Recruit ratings: Scout: Rivals: (N/A)					
A.J. Dugat; WR	Dayton, Texas	Dayton HS	6 ft 1 in (1.85 m)	204 lb (93 kg)	4.50	Jul 31, 2008
A.J. Dugat; WR	Recruit ratings: Scout: Rivals: (75)					
Keenan Flax; OL	Houston, Texas	Cypress Ridge HS	6 ft 4 in (1.93 m)	268 lb (122 kg)	N/A	Nov 20, 2008
Keenan Flax; OL	Recruit ratings: Scout: Rivals: (74)					
Kevin Forsch; OL	Spring, Texas	Spring HS	6 ft 5 in (1.96 m)	293 lb (133 kg)	5.30	Sep 5, 2008
Kevin Forsch; OL	Recruit ratings: Scout: Rivals: (75)					
Drew Hollingshead; QB	Rockwall, Texas	Rockwall-Heath HS	6 ft 3 in (1.91 m)	195 lb (88 kg)	4.81	Jul 29, 2008
Drew Hollingshead; QB	Recruit ratings: Scout: Rivals: (72)					
Darryl Jackson; DT	Houston, Texas	Yates HS	6 ft 4 in (1.93 m)	265 lb (120 kg)	N/A	Apr 4, 2008
Darryl Jackson; DT	Recruit ratings: Scout: Rivals: (N/A)					
Kelvin King; LB	Alief, Texas	Taylor HS	6 ft 2 in (1.88 m)	222 lb (101 kg)	4.70	May 19, 2008
Kelvin King; LB	Recruit ratings: Scout: Rivals: (69)					
Jeffrey Lewis; RB	Houston, Texas	Madison HS	5 ft 9 in (1.75 m)	178 lb (81 kg)	4.50	Feb 1, 2009
Jeffrey Lewis; RB	Recruit ratings: Scout: Rivals: (40)					
Devin Mays; DB	San Francisco, California	CC of San Francisco	5 ft 11 in (1.80 m)	173 lb (78 kg)	4.43	Jan 25, 2009
Devin Mays; DB	Recruit ratings: Scout: Rivals: (N/A)					
Ralph Oragwu; OL	Missouri City, Texas	Marshall HS	6 ft 4 in (1.93 m)	258 lb (117 kg)	4.92	Feb 28, 2008
Ralph Oragwu; OL	Recruit ratings: Scout: Rivals: (69)					
Jared Pickett; ATH	Missouri City, Texas	Marshall HS	5 ft 9 in (1.75 m)	168 lb (76 kg)	4.68	Feb 22, 2008
Jared Pickett; ATH	Recruit ratings: Scout: Rivals: (71)					
Zeke Riser; DE	La Vernia, Texas	La Vernia HS	6 ft 4 in (1.93 m)	233 lb (106 kg)	4.90	Nov 8, 2008
Zeke Riser; DE	Recruit ratings: Scout: Rivals: (40)					
Steven Robertson; LB	Cleveland, Texas	Cleveland HS	6 ft 2 in (1.88 m)	228 lb (103 kg)	4.70	May 2, 2008
Steven Robertson; LB	Recruit ratings: Scout: Rivals: (40)					
Radermon Scypion; DE	Port Arthur, Texas	Memorial HS	6 ft 4 in (1.93 m)	213 lb (97 kg)	4.95	Apr 5, 2008
Radermon Scypion; DE	Recruit ratings: Scout: Rivals: (72)					
Charles Sims; RB	Houston, Texas	Westbury HS	6 ft 0 in (1.83 m)	204 lb (93 kg)	4.50	May 15, 2008
Charles Sims; RB	Recruit ratings: Scout: Rivals: (75)					
DeAnthony Sims; DT	Houston, Texas	Westbury HS	6 ft 3 in (1.91 m)	304 lb (138 kg)	5.20	Nov 11, 2008
DeAnthony Sims; DT	Recruit ratings: Scout: Rivals: (71)					
Phillip Steward; LB	Sugar Land, Texas	Hightower HS	6 ft 1 in (1.85 m)	210 lb (95 kg)	N/A	Nov 24, 2008
Phillip Steward; LB	Recruit ratings: Scout: Rivals: (67)					
Broderick Thomas, Jr. ATH	Houston, Texas	Madison HS	6 ft 3 in (1.91 m)	180 lb (82 kg)	N/A	Feb 1, 2009
Broderick Thomas, Jr. ATH	Recruit ratings: Scout: Rivals: (78)					
Roy Watts; OL	Corsicana, Texas	Navarro	6 ft 6 in (1.98 m)	318 lb (144 kg)	5.30	Dec 17, 2008
Roy Watts; OL	Recruit ratings: Scout: Rivals: (N/A)					
Overall recruit ranking: Scout: 58 Rivals: 61
‡ Refers to 40-yard dash; Note: In many cases, Scout, Rivals, 247Sports, On3, and ESPN may conflict in their listings of height, weight and 40 time.; In these cases, the average was taken. ESPN grades are on a 100-point scale.; Sources: "Houston Commit List for 2009". Rivals.; "Houston: Commits". Scout.; "Houston Football Recruiting 2009". ESPN.; "Scout.com Team Recruiting Rankings". Scout.; "2009 Team Ranking". Rivals.com.

== Coaching staff ==
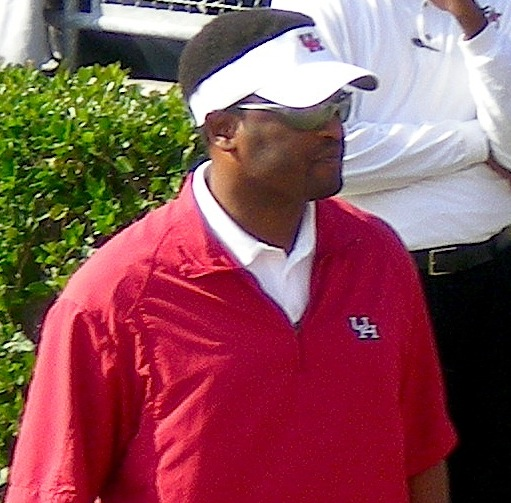
Houston head coach Kevin Sumlin

Name	Position	Alma mater (Year)
Kevin Sumlin	Head coach	Purdue (1986)
Dana Holgorsen	Offensive coordinator	Iowa Wesleyan (1992)
John Skladany	Defensive coordinator	Central Connecticut State (1972)
Jason Phillips	Co-Offensive coordinator	Houston (1988)
Leon Burtnett	Linebackers	Southwestern College (1965)
Jim Jeffcoat	Defensive line	Arizona State (1982)
Joe Gilbert	Offensive line	Hamilton (1987)
Tony Levine	Special teams	Minnesota (1996)
Clarence McKinney	Running backs	Mary (1994)
Charles McMillian	Defensive backs	Utah State (1995)
Zac Spavital	Cornerbacks	Murray State (2004)

== Schedule ==
Date	Time	Opponent	Rank	Site	TV	Result	Attendance
September 5	6:00 pm	Northwestern State*		Robertson Stadium; Houston, TX		W 55–7	22,043
September 12	2:30 pm	at No. 5 Oklahoma State*		Boone Pickens Stadium; Stillwater, OK	FSN	W 45–35	50,875
September 26	8:15 pm	Texas Tech*	No. 17	Robertson Stadium; Houston, TX (rivalry)	ESPN2	W 29–28	32,114^{A}
October 3	8:05 pm	at UTEP	No. 12	Sun Bowl Stadium; El Paso, TX		L 41–58	26,793
October 10	11:30 am	at Mississippi State*		Davis Wade Stadium; Starkville, MS	ESPNU	W 31–24	48,019
October 17	2:30 pm	at Tulane	No. 23	Louisiana Superdome; New Orleans, LA	CBSCS	W 44–16	22,891
October 24	6:30 pm	SMU^{†}	No. 17	Robertson Stadium; Houston, TX (rivalry)	CBSCS	W 38–15	26,889
October 31	12:00 pm	Southern Miss	No. 15	Robertson Stadium; Houston, TX	CSS	W 50–43	20,125
November 7	6:30 pm	at Tulsa	No. 13	H. A. Chapman Stadium; Tulsa, OK	CBSCS	W 46–45	20,243
November 14	11:00 am	at UCF	No. 13	Bright House Networks Stadium; Orlando, FL	CBSCS	L 32–37	34,437
November 21	12:00 pm	Memphis	No. 24	Robertson Stadium; Houston, TX	CSS	W 55–14	22,036
November 28	7:00 pm	Rice	No. 25	Robertson Stadium; Houston, TX (rivalry)	CSS	W 73–14	28,243
December 5	11:00 am	at East Carolina	No. 18	Dowdy–Ficklen Stadium; Greenville, NC (C-USA Championship)	ESPN2	L 32–38	33,048
December 31	11:00 am	vs. Air Force*		Amon G. Carter Stadium; Fort Worth, TX (Armed Forces Bowl)	ESPN	L 20–47	41,414
*Non-conference game; ^{†}Homecoming; Rankings from AP Poll released prior to the game; All times are in Central time

- ^A Denotes the largest crowd to have watched a football game at Robertson Stadium in its current capacity, and the largest Houston ever hosted on-campus. This was later broken the next season.

== Game summaries ==
=== Northwestern State ===
	1	2	3	4	Total
Northwestern State	0	7	0	0	7
Houston	28	13	7	7	55

The Northwestern State Demons of the Southland Conference traveled to Houston to meet with the Cougars for the first time in school history. Head coach Bradley Dale Peveto, a former Houston defensive coordinator and assistant head coach, led the Demons in his first game ever. With the first five touchdowns for Houston resulting from the Cougars' first five possessions, the Demons' first first down occurred only after the score was 28–0 in the home team's favor. With the game well in hand for the Cougars in the third quarter, starting quarterback Case Keenum was rested for the rest of the game.

=== Oklahoma State ===
	1	2	3	4	Total
Houston	10	14	0	21	45
#5 Oklahoma State	0	7	21	7	35

The Cougars traveled to Boone Pickens Stadium in Stillwater to face Oklahoma State (ranked 5th in the AP football poll and 6th in the Coaches' Poll). Houston came out of the gate with a touchdown and field goal in the first quarter, but Oklahoma State responded with a drive to the endzone in the beginning of the second quarter. However, Houston parlayed an onside kick into two more touchdowns to close the half. In the third quarter, Oklahoma State dominated, with touchdowns coming from rushes by Keith Toston and Beau Johnston. A punt return for 82 yards by Dez Bryant yielded another touchdown for Oklahoma State. However, the Cougars clawed back in the final quarter, with the help of a Case Keenum pass that turned into a tipped ball caught by Bryce Beall, and a Zac Robinson interception that was returned for a touchdown. Following the win, Houston was launched into the #21 ranked spot in the AP Poll, which marked the first time since 1991 in which the Cougars had been ranked in the top 25.

=== Texas Tech ===
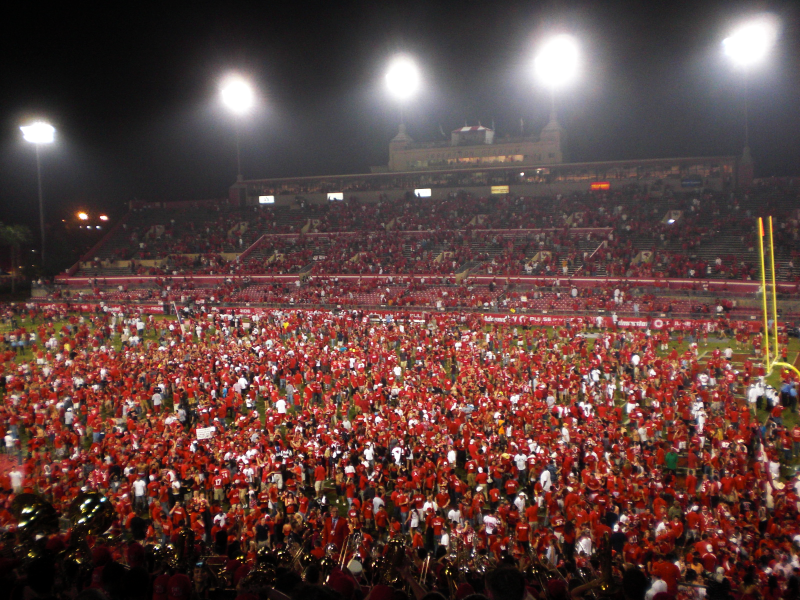
Houston fans rush the field in celebration after defeating Texas Tech

	1	2	3	4	Total
Texas Tech	7	14	7	0	28
#17 Houston	7	6	10	6	29

Houston faced-off against former Southwest Conference rivals, the Texas Tech Red Raiders, for the first time since the demise of that athletic conference following the 1995 season. The game also marked the first time that Houston hosted Texas Tech on-campus, as the Astrodome had served as the previous home for the Cougars during that era. During Houston's bye the week prior, AP and Coaches' Poll voters ranked the Cougars ahead in the polls to #17 and #23 respectively. It was the first time in eighteen years that Houston entered a game as a nationally ranked team.

Although attempting to recover from a loss to #2 Texas the week before, Texas Tech's starting quarterback Taylor Potts had passed for a career record of 46 passes for 420 yards.

The game received heavy media coverage, and was broadcast nationally on ESPN2. After a complete sell-out of public game tickets by Houston athletics, 1,500 student guest tickets went on sale the Monday morning before the game. With students arriving around midnight to await box office opening, all student guest passes were gone within three hours. The game marked a record attendance of 32,114 at Robertson Stadium in its current seating capacity including an appearance by U.S. Senator for Texas and gubernatorial candidate Kay Bailey Hutchison. Following a similar phenomenon from Monday, 5,500 students were allowed general admission into the game for no charge on gameday. Houston businessman Jim McIngvale donated a 9'x16' LED screen displaying the ESPN2 broadcast for use in the stadium parking lot during the game to accommodate the remainder of the University of Houston's 37,000 student enrollment who were unable to gain entry. UH Alumnus Hakeem Olajuwon facilitated the pre-game coin toss. Fellow alumnus and former Cougars basketball coach Clyde Drexler was also in attendance.

Although prior to the win, Texas Tech had been victors of the previous five meetings, the all-time record between the teams was updated to 18–10–1 with Houston leading. The Cougars' record improved to 3–0.

=== UTEP ===
	1	2	3	4	Total
#12 Houston	10	7	3	21	41
UTEP	3	14	20	21	58

Following the home victory, Houston went on the road to El Paso, Texas to face conference foe UTEP for the seventh time in school history. Having moved five spots up to #12 in the AP Poll prior to the game, the undefeated Cougars were heavily favored to win. UTEP's record was 1–3, and were coming off a 64–7 loss to Texas. Despite a remarkable attempt by Houston, where Case Keenum threw for a career record of 536 passing yards with 5 touchdowns, the Cougars could not contain UTEP's run-style offense. UTEP running back Donald Buckram ran for a career-high of 262 yards against Houston as the Miners completed a 58-41 upset. Houston's all-time record against UTEP fell to 3–4. The Cougars would fall completely out of both the AP Poll and Coaches' Poll top 25 rankings, but continued to receive votes.

=== Mississippi State ===
	1	2	3	4	Total
Houston	7	7	3	14	31
Mississippi State	7	10	0	7	24

Houston attempted to begin rebuilding after the UTEP upset in Starkville, Mississippi meeting with the Mississippi State Bulldogs. It was the fifteenth meeting between the two teams, where the Cougars held an 8–6 record over the Bulldogs who first competed against each other in 1956. The last time Mississippi State defeated Houston was in 1972, as the Cougars won the last two meetings. The game was nationally televised on ESPNU. The Bulldogs were able to contain Houston's offense to 17 points in three quarters and enter the fourth quarter in a tie game. The Cougars offense scored two touchdowns in rapid succession with six and four minutes to go in the game, and then conceded a touchdown run to Anthony Dixon with 1:22 to play. However, the Cougars were able to recover a Mississippi State onside kick attempt and went on to win the game. Following the win, the Cougars regained a place in the top 25 list for both the AP Poll and Coaches' Poll with a ranking of #23.

=== Tulane ===
	1	2	3	4	Total
#23 Houston	3	6	20	15	44
Tulane	3	3	0	10	16

Houston completed its three-game road trip in New Orleans, Louisiana against the Tulane Green Wave. With a record of 5-1 after completing the game, Houston was off to the best start of a season since 2003. Having competed against each other for the first time in 1968, the Cougars held a 10-4 all-time record against Tulane, and had won their last seven games against the Green Wave. Heavily favored Houston started off the game slowly against Tulane's pass defense which stood as the best in Conference USA at the time, and the Cougars went into halftime leading only 9-6 against the Green Wave. However, in the second half the offense exploded for 20 unanswered points in the third quarter and 15 points in the fourth while conceding 10, and Houston left the Superdome a 44-16 winner. Following the game, Houston rose to #17 in the AP Poll and to #18 in the Harris and Coaches' Polls. When the initial BCS ranking came out the following Sunday Houston secured the #17 spot, marking the first week the Cougars were ranked in the BCS poll.

=== SMU ===
	1	2	3	4	Total
SMU	0	3	0	12	15
#17 Houston	14	10	7	7	38

The Cougars returned to play in Houston for the first time since its September victory over Texas Tech to face the SMU Mustangs in their homecoming game. Another former Southwest Conference opponent, SMU was coached by second-year head coach June Jones. It was the 25th meeting between the teams, where Houston held a 15-9-1 record in the all-time series. The game was nationally televised on the CBS College Sports network. Houston took advantage of two SMU turnovers early in the game and utilized an effective running game to take a 24-3 lead into halftime. SMU's turnover issues continued into the second quarter as Houston kept going to freshman Charles Sims on the ground. Sims finished the game with 15 carries for 105 yards and two touchdowns. Case Keenum finished with comparatively light duty, only collecting 233 yards and two touchdowns on 36 completions as Houston dispatched SMU 38-15. Following the victory, Houston moved up to #15 in the AP poll and to #16 in the Coaches' and Harris polls, but moved down to #18 in the BCS poll.

=== Southern Miss ===
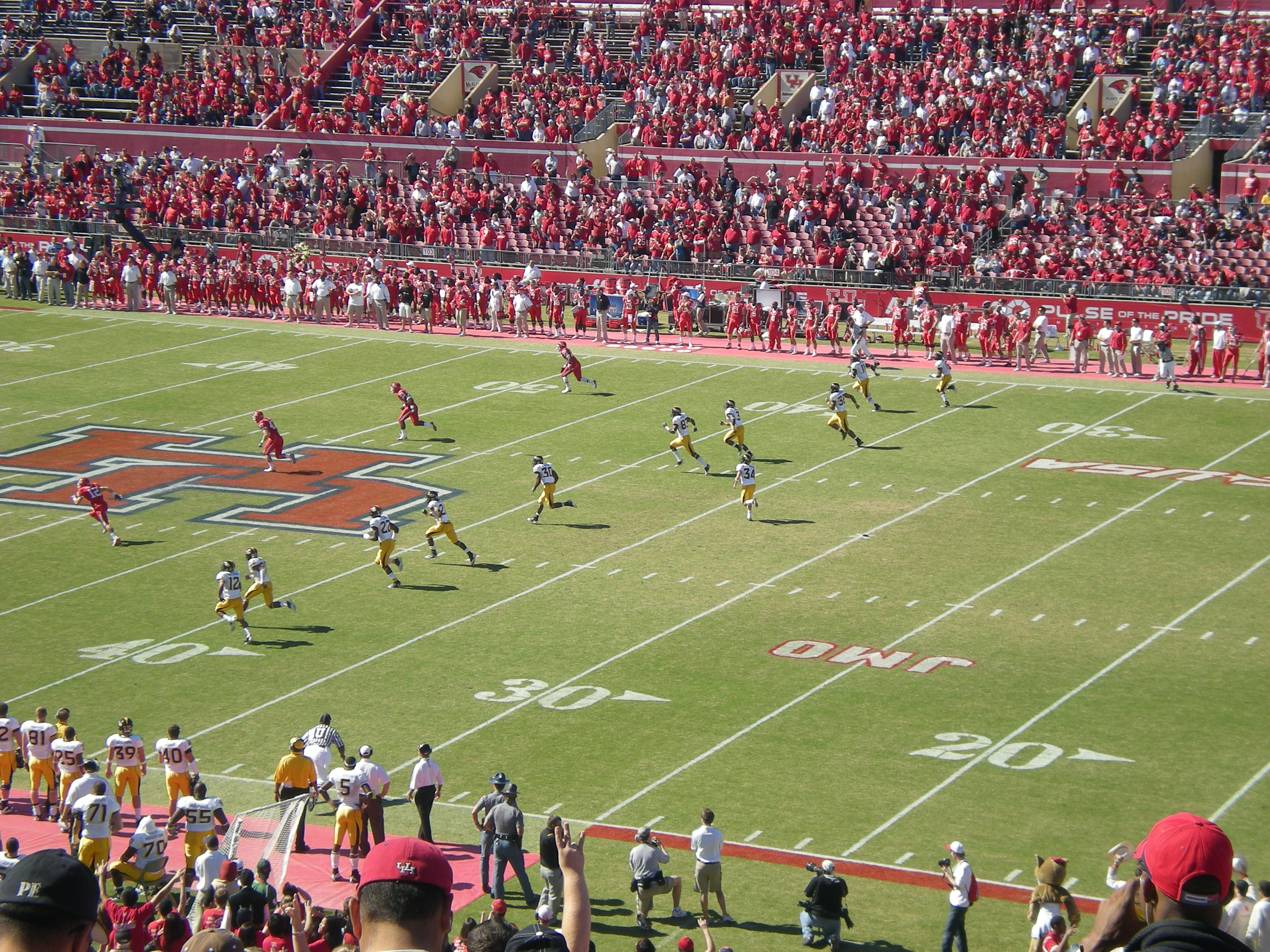
Southern Miss at Houston

	1	2	3	4	Total
USM	13	9	0	21	43
#18 Houston	7	23	3	17	50

The Cougars continued the 2009 season with a Halloween showdown versus conference rival Southern Miss. Houston came into the game at 7-1 and on its best start since 1990, in the days of the Southwest Conference. The two teams last met in the 2006 Conference USA Football Championship. The game turned into a shootout early as neither defense proved able to slow down quarterbacks Martevious Young and Case Keenum. Southern Miss led early 13-7 at the end of the first quarter, but Houston collected 23 points on three touchdowns and a returned blocked extra point to go into halftime leading 30-22. The game slowed down somewhat in the second half as Houston extended the lead to 40-22 in the fourth quarter, but Southern Miss's Young led the Golden Eagles to a late game comeback, scoring three touchdowns in eight minutes to tie the game at 43 with only 57 seconds left. However, Houston's Keenum calmly led the Cougars down the field in a scene reminiscent of the Texas Tech game and needed only 36 seconds to complete a game-winning touchdown drive. Keenum passed for a career record 559 yards that day. Houston escaped out of Robertson Stadium that day with a 50-43 victory. The following day, Houston found itself ranked 13th in the AP poll, 15th in the Coaches', 14th in the Harris, and 15th overall in the BCS poll, an improvement in all rankings.

=== Tulsa ===
	1	2	3	4	Total
#15 Houston	14	10	10	12	46
Tulsa	14	7	17	7	45

The 8-1 Cougars took to the road the following week to take on the ever-dangerous Tulsa Golden Hurricane. Houston came into the game with an 18-16 record all time versus Tulsa. The game took mostly the form of the previous game against Southern Miss, where neither team's defense were effective against potent passing attacks. The Cougars utilized a strong first half from wide receiver James Cleveland to go into halftime leading 24-21. Houston's defense nearly collapsed completely in the third quarter as Tulsa QB G.J. Kinne tore the Cougars apart in the air and on the ground, scoring three individual touchdowns in the third quarter. Houston's offense were able to keep up mostly with Tulsa, and the quarter ended with a 38-34 score favoring Tulsa. Tulsa's defense solidified somewhat in the fourth quarter, holding Houston out of the end zone on a goal line stand early and making Houston settle for a 26-yard field goal with eight minutes to play. Tulsa's offense then churned out one last scoring drive with three and a half minutes to play to bring the score to 45-37. Houston needed a touchdown with a two-point conversion on its last drive to tie the game. Keenum again led the Cougars down the field and threw a third touchdown pass to James Cleveland to bring UH to 45-43, but Keenum was sacked on the two-point conversion attempt. With only 21 seconds to play, Houston attempted a last gasp onside kick attempt which was successfully recovered by Tim Monroe. Keenum quickly brought the offense 27 yards down the field in three plays and then retired to give walkon freshman kicker Matt Hogan a chance to win the game on his leg. It was the first time Hogan had tried a field goal longer than 50 yards, but he booted the field goal down the middle as Houston escapes being upset once again, winning 46-45. The victory was the first one by game-winning field goal in school history. After the thrilling comeback, the Coaches' poll moved Houston to #12, the Harris to #13, and the BCS ranking remained unchanged at #15.

=== Central Florida ===
	1	2	3	4	Total
#15 Houston	10	7	0	15	32
UCF	0	10	13	14	37

With visions of a possible top 10 ranking in the near future, the 9-1 Cougars traveled to Orlando, Florida to play the Knights of Central Florida. UCF had met Houston only two times before, each team winning a game. The game began as though heavily favored Houston would win in less dramatic fashion than normal, easily taking a 10-0 lead to the second quarter. However, in the second quarter UCF began going to the ground and exploiting serious weaknesses in the run defense exposed by games against Texas Tech and UTEP. UCF ground out yards and jealously kept the ball out of the hands of the dangerous Houston offense. Unable to cope with the punishing ground game, Houston scored only one kickoff return touchdown in the next two quarters and UCF took a 23-17 lead into the fourth quarter. UCF scored two more touchdowns, one rushing and one passing, early in the fourth to move to 37-20 while grinding down clock and keeping the ball in UCF possession. Houston's offense broke out only with three and a half minutes to play by way of a touchdown pass, and then another one with only ten seconds to play to bring the game to 37-32. However this time, Houston would not recover the last second onside kick and UCF completed the upset. The victory by UCF was the first against a Top 25 ranked opponent in school history. After the loss, Houston dropped far in the polls to #22 in the Coaches' and #23 in the Harris, with the BCS dropping Houston further to #24. Not only had any vision of a BCS Bowl for the Cougars disappeared, even the possibility of a conference title began to come into doubt as the loss put SMU in the lead for the CUSA West division title.

=== Memphis ===
	1	2	3	4	Total
Memphis	7	7	0	0	14
#24 Houston	21	21	13	0	55

Houston returned to Robertson Stadium to lick their wounds of the previous week. The 1-9 Memphis Tigers were in town. Houston struck first, quickly, and often in the first half; Keenum completed 29 passes for 405 yards and 5 touchdowns before retiring just after halftime. Houston took a commanding 42-14 lead into halftime, and Houston tacked on two more touchdowns by way of a touchdown pass from backup quarterback Cotton Turner and a Charles Sims touchdown run to easily win 55-14. Memphis's two touchdowns came by way of running back Curtis Steele, indicating Houston had not fixed their major ground game issues. With the victory and a loss by SMU to Marshall earlier in the day, Houston ended the week as leader of CUSA West with only one game remaining. Houston's ranking recovered slightly the following day; the Coaches' and Harris polls placed the Cougars at #20 and the BCS at #23.

=== Rice ===
	1	2	3	4	Total
Rice	0	0	14	0	14
#23 Houston	24	35	7	7	73

The final game of the season was a Thanksgiving renewal of the rivalry with Rice, with the two teams playing for the Bayou Bucket. Houston came into the game with a 27-9 record versus the crosstown Owls. Much like the Memphis game, Houston's offense scored at will versus the Rice defense. Case Keenum scored only two touchdowns on 323 yards passing before hitting the showers at halftime, his Cougars leading 59-0. The game slowed down somewhat in the third quarter, and Houston extended its lead to 65-0 before Houston's reserves conceded two touchdowns. Houston's reserves added two touchdowns of their own, and the Cougars defended the Bayou Bucket 73-14. The 73 points was the most scored by any team in the 2009 NCAA Division I FBS season. The victory also sealed a CUSA West title for the Cougars - though SMU won earlier in the day, Houston owned the tiebreaker by way of defeating the Mustangs in October. Houston's ranking improved two spots in all polls; the Coaches' and Harris polls placed the Cougars at #18 and the BCS at #21.

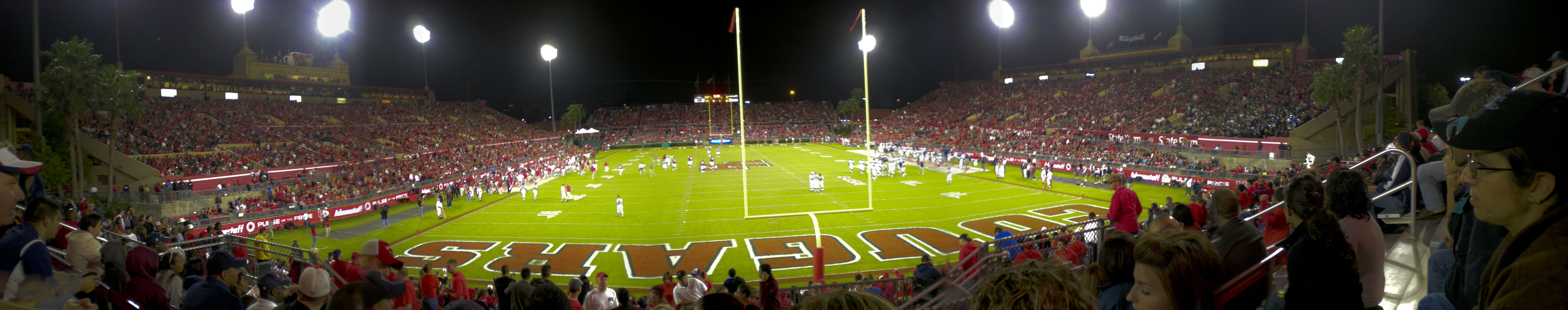
The 2009 Bayou Bucket Classic at Robertson Stadium

=== East Carolina (C-USA Championship) ===
	1	2	3	4	Total
#21 Houston	7	12	0	13	32
East Carolina	7	7	10	14	38

The Cougars, representing CUSA West, traveled to Greenville, North Carolina for the Conference USA Championship against defending champion East Carolina. ECU employed the same strategy used by conference mates UTEP and UCF in their upsets of the Cougars - run the football often and grind the clock. Alongside that, the ECU run defense stopped the Cougar running game completely cold (only 30 yards total rushing), leaving Houston to rely on the skills of Case Keenum to carry them through. The Cougar passing game did have success for a while as Houston led at halftime 19-14, but the Pirate defense became more and more stifling as the day wore on, finally Keenum threw two interceptions in the fourth quarter which after translating to two ECU rushing touchdowns put the game out of reach. ECU became the first school to successfully defend a Conference USA title by a score of 38-32. With this loss, the Cougars dropped to #25 in the Harris and Coaches' polls and out of the BCS poll completely.

Rumors persisted that Coach Sumlin was leaving for a position at Texas A&M. He continually denied those rumors which were proved true. The rumors of Sumlin leaving deeply affected how the Cougars played and it contributed to its loss.

Later in December, it was announced Houston accepted an invitation to play in the 2009 Armed Forces Bowl.

=== Air Force (Armed Forces Bowl) ===
	1	2	3	4	Total
Air Force	14	10	10	13	47
Houston	0	6	14	0	20

The 2009 Armed Forces Bowl was a rematch of the previous year's matchup between Houston and Air Force, which was itself a rematch of a 2008 regular season game. Houston won the bowl the previous season.

Houston's inability to stop a running game was exploited worst of all by Air Force, who features a running-heavy triple offense. Air Force running backs marched up and down the field and chewed up 41 minutes of game time while the Air Force's pass defense, statistically #1 in the nation, sat back and intercepted Case Keenum's passes seemingly at will - Air Force collected six interceptions in all, a career worst for Keenum. Air Force led comfortably 24-6 at halftime and Houston proved little resistance in the second half, losing in all 47-20. Houston had now lost nine of ten bowl games dating back to 1980. The loss removed Houston from every end-of-season poll.

== Poll rankings ==
Week-to-Week Rankings Legend: ██ Increase in ranking. ██ Decrease in ranking. ██ Not ranked the previous week.
Poll	Pre	Wk 1	Wk 2	Wk 3	Wk 4	Wk 5	Wk 6	Wk 7	Wk 8	Wk 9	Wk 10	Wk 11	Wk 12	Wk 13	Wk 14	Final
AP	RV	RV	21	17	12	RV	23	17	15	13	13	24	25	18	RV	NR
Coaches	RV	NR	RV	23	15	RV	23	18	16	15	12	22	20	18	25	RV
Harris	Not released				13	RV	23	18	16	14	13	23	20	18	25	
BCS	Not released							17	18	15	15	24	23	21	NR	

== Depth chart ==
Defense

FS
Nick Saenz
Tim Mercer

WLB	MLB	SLB
WLB_Starter	Marcus McGraw	SLB_Starter
Jeremy Smith	Nicholas Thurston	SLB_Backup

SS
Carson Blackmon
Roisean Haynes

CB
Jamal Robinson
Devin Mays

DE	DT	DT	DE
Radermon Scypion	David Hunter	Isaiah Thompson	Zeke Riser
Tyrell Graham	Tyrone Campbell	Ameen Behbahani	Kelvin King III

CB
Brandon Brinkley
Loyce Means

Offense

X
Patrick Edwards
L.J. Castile

Y
James Cleveland
Tim Monroe

LT	LG	C	RG	RT
Roy Watts	Jordan Shoemaker	Carl Barnett	Chris Thompson	Jarve Dean
Jaryd Anderson	Jaryd Anderson	Blake Sargent	Kevin Forsch	Chris Thompson

Z
Chaz Rodriguez
E.J. Smith

H
Tyron Carrier
Kierrie Johnson

QB
Case Keenum
Cotton Turner

RB
Bryce Beall
Charles Sims

Special teams
PK Matt Hogan
PK Jordan Mannisto
P Chase Turner
P Jordan Mannisto
KR Tyron Carrier
PR A.J. Dugat
H Case Keenum
