= Shea Smith =

American football player (born 1986)

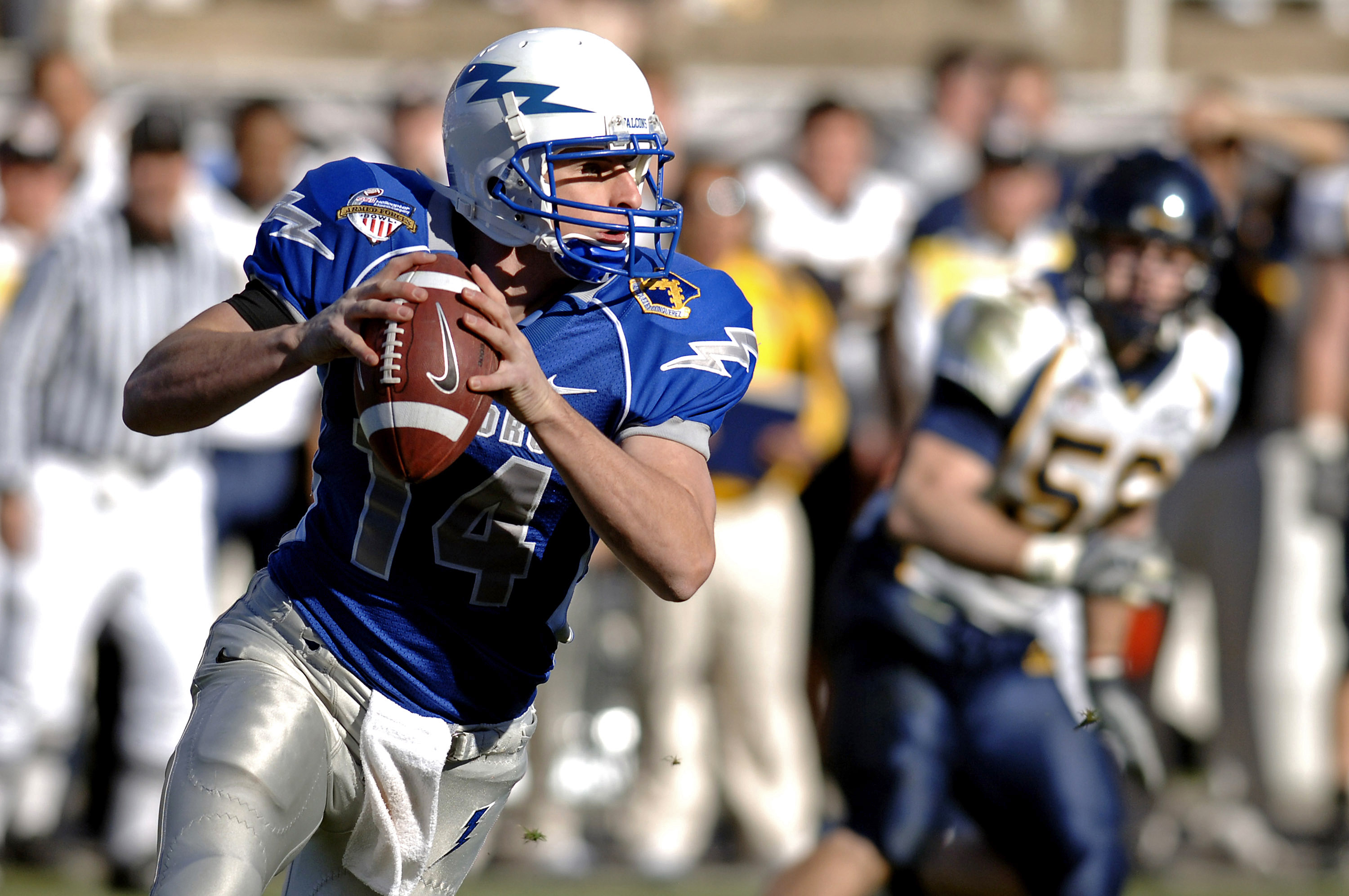
- Smith about to attempt a pass in the 2007 Armed Forces Bowl

No. 14
- Position: Quarterback

Personal information
- Born: October 27, 1986 (age 40); Odessa, Texas, U.S.
- Listed height: 5 ft 11 in (1.80 m)
- Listed weight: 190 lb (86 kg)

Career information
- High school: Permian (Odessa, Texas)
- College: Air Force (2005–2008)
- Stats at ESPN

Shea Smith (born October 27, 1986) is a former American college football quarterback who played for the Air Force Falcons.

== High school ==
Smith attended Permian High School in his hometown of Odessa, Texas, where he lettered in football under his father. During his high school career, he also lettered once in basketball and baseball. During his senior season, Smith was named to the second-team all-district football team.

== College career ==
Smith decided to attend the United States Air Force Academy near Colorado Springs, Colorado, after not receiving offers from his top four schools—Iowa, Texas A&M, Southern Methodist, and Texas Christian.

Under then-head coach Fisher DeBerry, Smith saw no varsity playing time in his freshman season, though did play for the program's junior varsity teams. In his sophomore season in 2006, he made his varsity debut in the Commander-in-Chief's Trophy against rival Army in a 43–7 victory, but did not accumulate any stats. His second appearance came at the end of the season in a 38–14 loss to TCU. In his sophomore year, Smith accumulated three rushes for a total of zero yards.

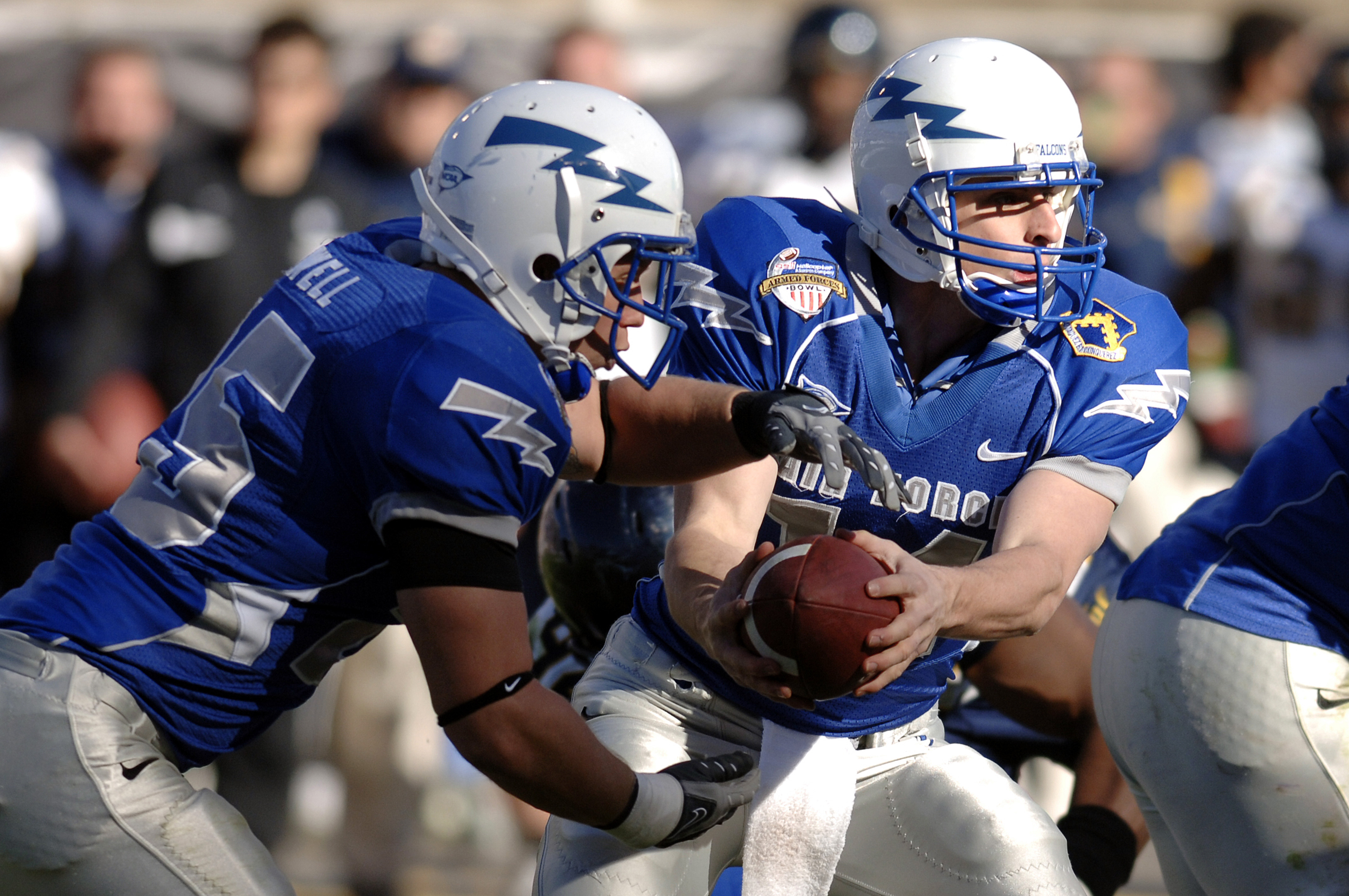
Smith hands off the ball to Todd Newell.

In the 2007 season, Smith saw more playing time on the varsity squad under head coach Troy Calhoun, though was still primarily a backup. His season debut came in a 34–3 victory over South Carolina State. He rushed once, for a six-yard gain. In the 2007 Armed Forces Bowl against the California Golden Bears, Smith stepped in as quarterback in the third quarter after starter Shaun Carney left the game with an injury. After not completing his first career pass, Smith connected with wide receiver Travis Dekker for a 13-yard gain. He ended the game 45 yards passing and 33 yards rushing in the Falcons' 42–36 loss. He made six appearances during the season.

Smith entered his senior year at Air Force, uncertain if he would be the starting quarterback. However, on August 11, Calhoun released a two-week depth chart, which named Smith as starter. In his first collegiate start, Smith passed for 75 yards and one touchdown, as well as rushing for 91 yards and another score, en route 41–7 blowout win over Southern Utah. Smith's first top-20 opponent came on September 20, 2008, when Air Force faced in-conference opponents #20 Utah. He completed 7-of-13 passing for 138 yards, one touchdown, and two interceptions. However, Air Force lost their first game of the season, 30–23—rallying for 14 points in the fourth quarter. Midway through the season, however, Smith was benched in favor of freshman quarterback Tim Jefferson. After being demoted to second-string quarterback, Smith saw very little action throughout the remainder of the season and did not play in five games. He saw some action in Air Force's final regular season game in a 44–10 loss to TCU.

The Falcons finished the regular season 8–4, including a bowl bid to the 2008 Armed Forces Bowl against Houston, who Air Force had previously defeated 31–28 earlier in the season. Jefferson got the start in the 34–28 loss, though Smith did play some part during the game.

Smith served as a graduate assistant coach for the Falcons, during the 2009 season, under Calhoun.

== Career statistics ==
Team	Season	Passing						Rushing				
Team	Season	Comp–Att	Pct.	TD	INT	Yards	Long	Att	Yards	Avg	TD	Long
Air Force	2006	0–0	—	0	0	0	0	3	0	0	0	4
Air Force	2007	4–12	33.3	0	0	45	23	5	39	7.8	0	13
Air Force	2008	30–57	52.6	4	3	413	53	60	229	3.8	6	41
Total		34–69	49.3	4	3	458	53	68	268	3.9	6	41

== Personal life ==
Smith was born to parents Scott and Kelly Smith in Odessa, Texas. He is one of their two children. Shea's younger brother, Braden, played football for Southern Methodist University and later Campbell University. Shea became a high school coach in his alma mater in Texas.
