= 2009 Conference USA football season =

- League: NCAA Division I Football Bowl Subdivision
- Sport: Football
- Duration: September 4, 2009 through January 2, 2010
- Teams: 12
- TV partner(s): ESPN, CBS College Sports, CSS, ISP Sports, Bright House Sports Network

2010 NFL Draft
- Top draft pick: DT Torell Troup, UCF
- Picked by: Buffalo Bills, 41st overall

Regular Season
- Season MVP: QB Case Keenum, Houston
- East champions: East Carolina
- West champions: Houston & SMU (co-champions)

Championship Game
- Champions: East Carolina
- Runners-up: Houston
- Finals MVP: WR Dwayne Harris, ECU

Football seasons
- 2008 2010

2009 Conference USA football standings
	Conf.			Overall
Team	W		L	W		L
East Division
East Carolina x$	7	–	1	9	–	5
UCF	6	–	2	8	–	5
Southern Miss	5	–	3	7	–	6
Marshall	4	–	4	7	–	6
UAB	4	–	4	5	–	7
Memphis	1	–	7	2	–	10
West Division
Houston xy	6	–	2	10	–	4
SMU x	6	–	2	8	–	5
Tulsa	3	–	5	5	–	7
UTEP	3	–	5	4	–	8
Rice	2	–	6	2	–	10
Tulane	1	–	7	3	–	9
Championship: East Carolina 38, Houston 32
$ – Conference champion; x – Division champion/co-champions; y – Championship game participant; Rankings from AP Poll

The 2009 Conference USA football season was the 15th season of the conference's existence.

== C-USA vs. BCS matchups ==
Date	Visitor	Home	Winner
September 6	Memphis	Mississippi	Ole Miss, 45–14
September 12	East Carolina	West Virginia	West Virginia, 35–20
September 12	Houston	Oklahoma State	Houston, 45–35
September 12	Marshall	Virginia Tech	Virginia Tech, 52–10
September 12	Rice	Texas Tech	Texas Tech, 55–10
September 12	Kansas	UTEP	Kansas, 34–7
September 19	East Carolina	North Carolina	North Carolina, 31–17
September 19	SMU	Washington State	Washington State, 30–27 (OT)
September 19	Virginia	Southern Miss	Southern Miss, 37–34
September 19	Rice	Oklahoma State	Oklahoma State, 41–24
September 19	Tulsa	Oklahoma	Oklahoma, 45–0
September 26	Texas Tech	Houston	Houston, 29–28
September 26	Southern Miss	Kansas	Kansas, 35–28
September 26	Vanderbilt	Tulane	Vanderbilt, 36–17
September 26	UAB	Texas A&M	Texas A&M, 56–19
September 26	UTEP	Texas	Texas, 64–7
October 10	Houston	Mississippi State	Houston, 31-24
October 17	Marshall	West Virginia	West Virginia, 24–7
October 17	UAB	Mississippi	Ole Miss, 48–13
October 17	Miami	UCF	Miami, 7–27
October 31	Tulane	LSU	LSU, 42-0
November 7	Memphis	Tennessee	Tennessee, 56-28
November 7	UCF	Texas	Texas, 35-3

== Regular season ==
Index to colors and formatting
Conference USA member won
Conference USA member lost
Conference USA teams in **bold**

=== Week one ===
Date	Time	Visiting team	Home team	Site	TV	Result	Attendance
September 5	11 a.m.	#1 (FCS) Appalachian State	East Carolina	Dowdy–Ficklen Stadium • Greenville, North Carolina	MASN/WITN-TV	**W** 29-24	43,279
September 5	3:30 p.m.	Southern Illinois	Marshall	Joan C. Edwards Stadium • Huntington, West Virginia		**W** 31-28	24,012
September 5	6 p.m.	Northwestern State	Houston	Robertson Stadium • Houston, Texas		**W** 55-7	22,043
September 5	6:30 p.m.	Samford	UCF	Bright House Networks Stadium • Orlando, Florida	BHSN	**W** 28-24	34,486
September 5	6 p.m.	Alcorn State	Southern Miss	M. M. Roberts Stadium • Hattiesburg, Mississippi		**W** 52-0	36,232
September 5	8 p.m.	Buffalo	UTEP	Sun Bowl Stadium • El Paso, Texas	CBS CS	**L** 23-17	35,213
September 5	7 p.m.	Stephen F. Austin	SMU	Gerald J. Ford Stadium • Dallas, Texas		**W** 31-23	34.749
September 6	12 p.m.	#8 Mississippi	Memphis	Liberty Bowl Stadium • Memphis, Tennessee	ESPN	**L** 45-14	45,207

=== Week two ===
Date	Time	Visiting team	Home team	Site	TV	Result	Attendance
September 12	12:30 p.m.	**Marshall**	#14 Virginia Tech	Lane Stadium • Blacksburg, Virginia	ESPN360	**L** 52-10	66,233
September 12	2:30 p.m.	**East Carolina**	West Virginia	Mountaineer Field • Morgantown, West Virginia	ESPN360	**L** 35-20	59,216
September 12	2:30 p.m.	**Houston**	#5 Oklahoma State	Boone Pickens Stadium • Stillwater, Oklahoma	FSN	**W** 45-35	50,875
September 12	2:30 p.m.	#9 BYU	**Tulane**	Louisiana Superdome • New Orleans, Louisiana	ESPN2	**L** 54-3	26,224
September 12	6 p.m.	**Memphis**	Middle Tennessee	Johnny "Red" Floyd Stadium • Murfreesboro, Tennessee	CSS	**L** 31-14	28,105
September 12	6 p.m.	**Rice**	Texas Tech	Jones AT&T Stadium • Lubbock, Texas		**L** 55-10	48,124
September 12	6:30 p.m.	#24 Kansas	**UTEP**	Sun Bowl Stadium • El Paso, Texas	CBS CS	**L** 34-7	31,885
September 12	7 p.m.	**Tulsa**	New Mexico	University Stadium • Albuquerque, New Mexico	The Mtn.	**W** 44-10	30,051

=== Week three ===
Date	Time	Visiting team	Home team	Site	TV	Result	Attendance
September 19	11 a.m.	**East Carolina**	#24 North Carolina	Kenan Memorial Stadium • Chapel Hill, North Carolina	ESPN2	**L** 31-17	58,000
September 19	2:30 p.m.	Virginia	**Southern Miss**	M. M. Roberts Stadium • Hattiesburg, Mississippi	CBS CS	**W** 37-34	31,170
September 19	2:30 p.m.	**Tulsa**	#12 Oklahoma	Gaylord Family Oklahoma Memorial Stadium • Norman, Oklahoma	FSN	**L** 45-0	84,803
September 19	2:30 p.m.	**UAB**	Troy	Movie Gallery Stadium • Troy, Alabama	CSS/WABM	**L** 27-14	21,182
September 19	4 p.m.	**SMU**	Washington State	Martin Stadium • Pullman, Washington		**L** 30-27 OT	22,319
September 19	6 p.m.	Bowling Green	**Marshall**	Joan C. Edwards Stadium • Huntington, West Virginia	WSAZ-TV	**W** 17-10	23,029
September 19	6 p.m.	#16 Oklahoma State	**Rice**	Boone Pickens Stadium • Stillwater, Oklahoma		**L** 41-24	51,803
September 19	6:30 p.m.	Buffalo	**UCF**	Bright House Networks Stadium • Orlando, Florida	BHSN	**W** 23-17	33,689
September 19	7 p.m.	**UTEP**	New Mexico State	Aggie Memorial Stadium • Las Cruces, New Mexico	ESPN360	**W** 38-12	20,439
September 19	7:30 p.m.	UT Martin	**Memphis**	Liberty Bowl Stadium • Memphis, Tennessee		**W** 41-14	21,428

=== Week four ===
Date	Time	Visiting team	Home team	Site	TV	Result	Attendance
September 26	11:30 a.m.	**Southern Miss**	#20 Kansas	Memorial Stadium • Lawrence, Kansas	FSN	**L** 35-28	50,025
September 26	2:30 p.m.	McNeese State	**Tulane**	Louisiana Superdome • New Orleans, Louisiana		**W** 42-32	29,028
September 26	2:30 p.m.	**UTEP**	#2 Texas	Darrell K Royal–Texas Memorial Stadium • Austin, Texas		**L** 64-7	101,144
September 26	6 p.m.	Sam Houston State	**Tulsa**	Skelly Field at H. A. Chapman Stadium • Tulsa, Oklahoma		**W** 56-3	26,048
September 26	6 p.m.	**UAB**	Texas A&M	Kyle Field • College Station, Texas		**L** 56-19	74,656
September 26	7 p.m.	Vanderbilt	**Rice**	Rice Stadium • Houston, Texas	CSS	**L** 36-17	19,753
September 26	8:15 p.m.	Texas Tech	**#17 Houston**	Robertson Stadium • Houston, Texas	ESPN2	**W** 29-28	32,114

=== Week five ===
Date	Time	Visiting team	Home team	Site	TV	Result	Attendance
October 3	11 a.m.	**Tulane**	Army	Michie Stadium • West Point, New York	CBS CS	**W** 17-16	26,076
October 3	7 p.m.	**SMU**	#11 TCU	Amon G. Carter Stadium • Fort Worth, Texas	The Mtn.	**L** 39-14	37,130

=== Week six ===
Date	Time	Visiting team	Home team	Site	TV	Result	Attendance
October 10	11:30 a.m.	**Houston**	Mississippi State	Davis Wade Stadium • Starkville, Mississippi	ESPNU	**W** 31-24	48,019
October 10	2:30 p.m.	Navy	**Rice**	Rice Stadium • Houston, Texas	CBS CS	**L** 63-14	15,096
October 10	6:30 p.m.	**Southern Miss**	Louisville	Papa John's Cardinal Stadium • Louisville, Kentucky	ESPNU	**L** 25-23	37,268

=== Week seven ===
Date	Time	Visiting team	Home team	Site	TV	Result	Attendance
October 17	2:30 p.m.	**Marshall**	West Virginia	Mountaineer Field • Morgantown, West Virginia	ESPN+	**L** 24-7	54,432
October 17	6 p.m.	**UAB**	Ole Miss	Vaught–Hemingway Stadium • Oxford, Mississippi	FSN	**L** 48-13	47,612
October 17	6 p.m.	#9 Miami	**UCF**	Bright House Networks Stadium • Orlando, Florida	CBS CS	**L** 27-7	48,453
October 17	7 p.m.	Navy	**SMU**	Gerald J. Ford Stadium • Dallas, Texas		**L** 38-35 OT	22,203

== Players of the week ==
Week	Offensive		Defensive		Special teams	
Week	Player	Team	Player	Team	Player	Team
1 – Sep. 7	Joe Webb, QB	UAB	Rock Dennis, DB	SMU	Damaris Johnson, KR/PR	Tulsa
2 – Sep. 14	Case Keenum, QB	Houston	Jamal Robinson, CB	Houston	Michael Such, P	Tulsa
3 – Sep. 21	Emmanuel Sanders, WR	SMU	Albert McClellan, DE	Marshall	Freddie Parham, WR/KR	Southern Miss
4 – Sep. 28	Case Keenum, QB	Houston	David Hunter, DT	Houston	Peter Boehme, P	Southern Miss
5 – Oct. 5	Donald Buckram, RB	UTEP	Hiram Atwater, S	UAB	Damaris Johnson, KR/PR	Tulsa
6 – Oct. 12	Curtis Steele, RB	Memphis	Brandon Brinkley, CB	Houston	Margus Hunt, DE	SMU
7 – Oct. 19	Case Keenum, QB	Houston	DeAundre Brown, DB	Tulsa	Dwayne Harris, KR	East Carolina
8 – Oct. 26	Donald Buckram, RB	UTEP	C.J. Cavness, LB	Houston	Tyron Carrier, KR	Houston
9 – Nov. 2	Case Keenum, QB	Houston	Bruce Miller, DE	UCF	Fendi Onobun, TE	Houston

== All-Conference players ==
Coaches All-Conference Selections

Position	Player	Class	Team
First Team Offense (Coaches)
QB	Case Keenum	JR	Houston
RB	Curtis Steele	SR	Memphis
RB	Donald Buckman	JR	UTEP
OL	Sean Allen	SR	East Carolina
OL	Ryan Herbert	SR	Southern Miss
OL	Jake Seitz	SR	UAB
OL	Jah Reid	JR	UCF
OL	Mike Aguayo	JR	UTEP
TE	Cody Slate	SR	Marshall
WR	Dwayne Harris	JR	East Carolina
WR	James Cleveland	JR	Houston
WR	Emmanuel Sanders	SR	SMU
First Team Defense (Coaches)
DL	Linval Joseph	JR	East Carolina
DL	C. J. Wilson	SR	East Carolina
DL	Jarvis Geathers	SR	UCF
DL	Bruce Miller	JR	UCF
LB	Mario Harvey	SR	Marshall
LB	Chase Kennemer	SR	SMU
LB	Cory Hogue	SR	UCF
DB	Emanuel Davis	SO	East Carolina
DB	Van Eskridge	SR	East Carolina
DB	Eddie Hicks	SR	Southern Miss
DB	Da'Mon Cromartie-Smith	SR	UTEP
First Team Special Teams (Coaches)
K	Craig Ratanamorn	SR	Marshall
P	Matt Dodge	SR	East Carolina
KR	Tyron Carrier	SO	Houston
PR	Emmanuel Sanders	SR	SMU
LS	Sean McClellan	SR	Marshall

Position	Player	Class	Team
Second Team Offense (Coaches)
QB	Joe Webb	SR	UAB
RB	Darius Marshall	JR	Marshall
RB	Damion Fletcher	SR	Southern Miss
OL	Terence Campbell	SR	East Carolina
OL	Jarve Dean	JR	Houston
OL	Daniel Baldridge	SR	Marshall
OL	Scott Mitchell	JR	Rice
OL	Kelvin Beachum	SO	SMU
TE	Leroy Banks	SR	Southern Miss
WR	Patrick Edwards	SO	Houston
WR	Duke Calhoun	SR	Memphis
WR	DeAndre Brown	SO	Southern Miss
WR	Damaris Johnson	SO	Tulsa
Second Team Defense (Coaches)
DL	Tyrell Graham	SR	Houston
DL	Albert McClellan	SR	Marshall
DL	Scott Solomon	JR	Rice
DL	Torell Troup	SR	UCF
LB	Nick Johnson	SR	East Carolina
LB	Marcus McGraw	SO	Houston
LB	Korey Williams	SO	Southern Miss
DB	Brandon Brinkley	SR	Houston
DB	James Lockett	SR	Tulsa
DB	Hiram Atwater	JR	UAB
DB	Josh Robinson	FR	UCF
Second Team Special Teams (Coaches)
K	Ben Hartman	SR	East Carolina
P	Matt Reagan	SR	Memphis
KR	Dwayne Harris	JR	East Carolina
PR	Damaris Johnson	SO	Tulsa
LS	Cody Tawater	SR	Southern Miss
