= Tyron Carrier =

American gridiron football player and coach (born 1987)

Current position
- Title: Wide receivers coach
- Team: Houston Gamblers

Biographical details
- Born: December 19, 1987 (age 38); Houston, Texas, U.S.
- Education: Houston (TX) Worthing

Playing career
- 2008–2011: Houston
- 2013: Wichita Falls Nighthawks
- 2013: Montreal Alouettes
- 2014: Wichita Falls Nighthawks
- Position: Wide receiver/kick returner

Coaching career (HC unless noted)
- 2015: Baylor (GA)
- 2016–2018: West Virginia (WR)
- 2019: Houston (AHC/WR)
- 2020: Houston (WR)
- 2021: Texas A&M–Commerce (WR)
- 2022–2023: Grambling State (WR)
- 2024: Temple (WR)
- 2025: Coastal Carolina (WR)
- 2026: Houston Gamblers (WR)

Accomplishments and honors

Awards
- C-USA Special Teams POY (2011); First-team All-C-USA (2009); Second-team All-C-USA (2011)

Tyron North Carrier (born December 19, 1987) is an American football coach for the Houston Gamblers of the United Football League (UFL). He was formerly a wide receiver for the Montreal Alouettes of the Canadian Football League (CFL). He played college football at Houston.

== College career ==
Carrier finished his college career with 320 receptions, which is the second most in NCAA Division I/FBS history. In his career, Carrier returned seven kickoffs for touchdowns, an NCAA FBS record that he shares with Clemson's C. J. Spiller, San Diego State's Rashaad Penny, and Memphis's Tony Pollard. His 7,490 career all-purpose yards ranks sixth all-time. Carrier also holds the FBS record of 53 consecutive games with at least two receptions.

Pre-draft measurables
Height	Weight	Bench press
5 ft 6 1/2 in (1.69 m)	159 lb (72 kg)	10 reps
All values from Pro Day

== Coaching career ==
In 2016, Carrier was hired as the wide receivers coach for the West Virginia Mountaineers.

In 2019, Carrier joined Dana Holgorsen at the University of Houston as assistant head coach and wide receivers coach. He and the school parted ways in May 2021.

After spending the 2021 season out of coaching, Carrier was hired in March 2022 as the wide receivers coach at Texas A&M–Commerce.

In 2023, Carrier was hired as the outside wide receivers coach for Grambling State.

== See also ==
- 2008 Houston Cougars football team
- 2009 Houston Cougars football team
- 2010 Houston Cougars football team
- 2011 Houston Cougars football team
