= 2008 Houston Cougars football team =

American college football season

2008 Houston Cougars football

Armed Forces Bowl champion

Armed Forces Bowl, W 34–28 vs. Air Force
- Conference: Conference USA
- West Division
- Record: 8–5 (6–2 C-USA)
- Head coach: Kevin Sumlin (1st season)
- Offensive coordinator: Dana Holgorsen (1st season)
- Co-offensive coordinator: Jason Phillips (1st season)
- Offensive scheme: Spread
- Defensive coordinator: John Skladany (1st season)
- Base defense: 4–3
- Captains: Ken Fontenette; Mark Hafner; Phillip Hunt; Case Keenum; SirVincent Rogers
- Home stadium: Robertson Stadium

2008 Conference USA football standings
	Conf.			Overall
Team	W		L	W		L
East Division
East Carolina x$	6	–	2	9	–	5
Memphis	4	–	4	6	–	7
Southern Miss	4	–	4	7	–	6
UAB	3	–	5	4	–	8
UCF	3	–	5	4	–	8
Marshall	3	–	5	4	–	8
West Division
Tulsa xy	7	–	1	11	–	3
Rice x	7	–	1	10	–	3
Houston	6	–	2	8	–	5
UTEP	4	–	4	5	–	7
Tulane	1	–	7	2	–	10
SMU	0	–	8	1	–	11
Championship: East Carolina 27, Tulsa 24
$ – Conference champion; x – Division champion/co-champions; y – Championship game participant; Rankings from AP Poll

The 2008 Houston Cougars football team represented the University of Houston as a member of Conference USA (C-USA) during the 2008 NCAA Division I FBS football season. Led by first-year head coach Kevin Sumlin, the Cougars compiled an overall record of 8–5 with a mark of 6–2 in conference play, placing third in C-USA's West Division. Houston was invited to the Armed Forces Bowl, where the Cougars defeated Air Force. The team played home games on campus, at Robertson Stadium in Houston.

Sumlin, whose previous position was as co-offensive coordinator for the Oklahoma Sooners, replaced Art Briles. Houston's victory in the Armed Forces Bowl was the program's first bowl game win since the 1980 Garden State Bowl, and snapped a streak of eight straight bowl game loses, the longest in NCAA Division I Football Bowl Subdivision (FBS) at the time. The Cougars defeated two nationally-ranked opponents for the first time since the 1984 season.

== Schedule ==
Date	Time	Opponent	Site	TV	Result	Attendance	Source
August 30	6:00 pm	Southern*	Robertson Stadium; Houston, TX		W 55–3	26,555	
September 6	6:05 pm	at Oklahoma State*	Boone Pickens Stadium; Stillwater, OK		L 37–56	45,001	
September 13	2:30 pm	vs. Air Force*	Gerald J. Ford Stadium; Dallas, TX		L 28–31	2,546	
September 20	2:30 pm	at Colorado State*	Hughes Stadium; Fort Collins, CO		L 25–28	21,539	
September 27	2:30 p.m.	at No. 23 East Carolina	Dowdy–Ficklen Stadium; Greenville, NC	CBS-CS	W 41–24	43,641	
October 9	7:00 pm	UAB	Robertson Stadium; Houston, TX	CBS-CS	W 45–20	18,526	
October 18	7:00 pm	at SMU	Gerald J. Ford Stadium; Dallas, TX (rivalry)		W 44–38	18,972	
October 28	7:00 pm	at Marshall	Joan C. Edwards Stadium; Huntington, WV	ESPN2	L 23–37	20,716	
November 8	7:00 pm	Tulane^{†}	Robertson Stadium; Houston, TX	CBS-CS	W 42–14	23,522	
November 15	7:00 pm	No. 25 Tulsa	Robertson Stadium; Houston, TX	CBS-CS	W 70–30	20,855	
November 22	2:30 pm	UTEP	Robertson Stadium; Houston, TX		W 42–37	18,134	
November 28	2:30 pm	at Rice	Rice Stadium; Houston, TX (rivalry)	CBS-CS	L 42–56	35,534	
December 31	11:00 am	vs. Air Force*	Amon G. Carter Stadium; Fort Worth, TX (Armed Forces Bowl)	ESPN	W 34–28	41,127	
*Non-conference game; ^{†}Homecoming; Rankings from AP Poll released prior to the game; All times are in Central time

== Preseason ==
=== Recruiting ===
Twenty players were recruited for the 2008 season. Several higher-ranking recruits were lost when Art Briles left, as they followed the coach to Baylor. Due to Houston's head coach change, Sumlin's ability to recruit before National Signing Day was shorter than usual, as he was finishing his duties with the Oklahoma Sooners. In early April, it was announced that the Cougars had two other junior college commitments. Kyle Thomas and Nick Thurston, both from California, came from the City College of San Francisco. Two other junior college (JUCO) commitments, Clint Leal and Kierrie Johnson, were recruited from Blinn College. Thomas is expected to join the roster in the Spring, as he still had some coursework to finish in California.

College recruiting (2008)
Name	Hometown	School	Height	Weight	40^{‡}	Commit date
Jacolby Ashworth; OL	Lufkin, TX	Lufkin HS	6 ft 4 in (1.93 m)	275 lb (125 kg)	N/A	Jan 20, 2008
Jacolby Ashworth; OL	Recruit ratings: Scout: Rivals:					
Bryce Beall; DB	Tatum, TX	Tatum HS	6 ft 0 in (1.83 m)	200 lb (91 kg)	4.5	Jan 27, 2008
Bryce Beall; DB	Recruit ratings: Scout: Rivals:					
Gino Collins; ATH	Houston, TX	St. Pius X HS	6 ft 0 in (1.83 m)	181 lb (82 kg)	4.5	Jul 22, 2007
Gino Collins; ATH	Recruit ratings: Scout: Rivals:					
Doran Guillory; DE	Beaumont, TX	Monsignor Kelly HS	6 ft 3 in (1.91 m)	270 lb (120 kg)	4.75	Jan 27, 2008
Doran Guillory; DE	Recruit ratings: Scout: Rivals:					
Jackie Hinton; ATH	Channelview, TX	Channelview HS	5 ft 10 in (1.78 m)	186 lb (84 kg)	4.5	Jan 13, 2008
Jackie Hinton; ATH	Recruit ratings: Scout: Rivals:					
David Hunter; OL	Waller, TX	Waller HS	6 ft 2 in (1.88 m)	270 lb (120 kg)	4.9	Jan 20, 2008
David Hunter; OL	Recruit ratings: Scout: Rivals:					
Kierrie Johnson; WR	Brenham, TX	Blinn College	5 ft 10 in (1.78 m)	175 lb (79 kg)	4.4	Jun 2, 2008
Kierrie Johnson; WR	Recruit ratings: Scout:					
Kris Johnston; DB	Texas City, TX	Texas City HS	6 ft 1 in (1.85 m)	186 lb (84 kg)	4.5	Aug 26, 2007
Kris Johnston; DB	Recruit ratings: Scout: Rivals:					
Clint Leal; LB	Brenham, TX	Blinn College	6 ft 5 in (1.96 m)	235 lb (107 kg)	N/A	Mar 13, 2008
Clint Leal; LB	Recruit ratings: No ratings found					
Anthony Lewis; LB	Houston, TX	Aldine HS	6 ft 2 in (1.88 m)	210 lb (95 kg)	4.5	Jan 13, 2008
Anthony Lewis; LB	Recruit ratings: Scout: Rivals:					
Jordan Mannisto; K	Westlake Village, CA	Westlake HS	6 ft 0 in (1.83 m)	175 lb (79 kg)	4.7	Jan 28, 2008
Jordan Mannisto; K	Recruit ratings: Scout: Rivals:					
Marcus McGraw; LB	Arlington, TX	Bowie HS	5 ft 10 in (1.78 m)	210 lb (95 kg)	4.6	Jan 28, 2008
Marcus McGraw; LB	Recruit ratings: Scout: Rivals:					
Nicholas Saenz; DB	Pearland, TX	Pearland HS	6 ft 0 in (1.83 m)	160 lb (73 kg)	4.45	Jun 1, 2007
Nicholas Saenz; DB	Recruit ratings: Scout: Rivals:					
Blake Sargent; DT	Friendswood, TX	Friendswood HS	6 ft 3 in (1.91 m)	272 lb (123 kg)	N/A	Jul 29, 2007
Blake Sargent; DT	Recruit ratings: Scout: Rivals:					
Jarvis Smith; LB	Houston, TX	Chavez HS	6 ft 2 in (1.88 m)	205 lb (93 kg)	N/A	Jan 14, 2008
Jarvis Smith; LB	Recruit ratings: Scout: Rivals:					
Isaiah Sweeney; WR	Sugar Land, TX	Hightower HS	5 ft 10 in (1.78 m)	170 lb (77 kg)	N/A	Jan 20, 2008
Isaiah Sweeney; WR	Recruit ratings: Scout: Rivals:					
Ari Tatum; TE	Dacula, GA	Dacula HS	6 ft 5 in (1.96 m)	225 lb (102 kg)	4.73	Jun 8, 2007
Ari Tatum; TE	Recruit ratings: Scout: Rivals:					
Kyle Thomas; DE	San Francisco, CA	City College of San Francisco	6 ft 5 in (1.96 m)	250 lb (110 kg)	4.7	Mar 30, 2008
Kyle Thomas; DE	Recruit ratings: Scout: Rivals:					
Nick Thurston; LB	San Francisco, CA	City College of San Francisco	6 ft 1 in (1.85 m)	245 lb (111 kg)	N/A	Mar 30, 2008
Nick Thurston; LB	Recruit ratings: No ratings found					
Mohammed Usman; DE	Arlington, TX	Bowie HS	6 ft 1 in (1.85 m)	235 lb (107 kg)	N/A	Jan 28, 2008
Mohammed Usman; DE	Recruit ratings: Scout: Rivals:					
Ken Van Heule; OL	Hurst, TX	Bell HS	6 ft 4 in (1.93 m)	265 lb (120 kg)	N/A	Jan 20, 2008
Ken Van Heule; OL	Recruit ratings: Scout: Rivals:					
Ronnie Williams; WR	Houston, TX	Sterling HS	5 ft 11 in (1.80 m)	180 lb (82 kg)	4.6	Jan 29, 2008
Ronnie Williams; WR	Recruit ratings: Scout: Rivals:					
Chris Wilson; RB	Sugar Land, TX	Stephen F. Austin HS	5 ft 10 in (1.78 m)	194 lb (88 kg)	N/A	Jan 20, 2008
Chris Wilson; RB	Recruit ratings: Scout: Rivals:					
Overall recruit ranking: Scout: 77 Rivals: 100
‡ Refers to 40-yard dash; Note: In many cases, Scout, Rivals, 247Sports, On3, and ESPN may conflict in their listings of height, weight and 40 time.; In these cases, the average was taken. ESPN grades are on a 100-point scale.; Sources: "2008 Team Ranking". Rivals.com.

=== Coaching staff and changes ===
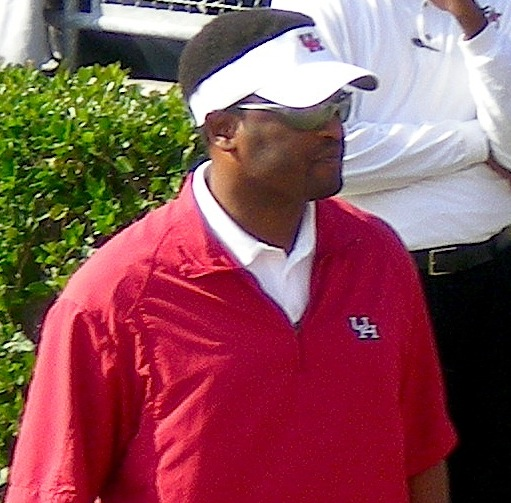
Kevin Sumlin, Cougars head coach

Former co-offensive coordinator for the Oklahoma Sooners, Kevin Sumlin replaced Art Briles as head coach. Sumlin became the first African-American head coach in Cougar history, and the eighth in the NCAA's Football Bowl Subdivision. In his final year with the Sooners, his offense was one of the best in the country, averaging 44 points per game.

Dana Holgorsen came to Houston from the Texas Tech Red Raiders, where he spent eight years as offensive coordinator and quarterbacks coach. He serves the Cougars in the same capacity.

John Skladany replaced Alan Weddell as defensive coordinator. Skladany came from the UCF Knights, a fellow C-USA team. Prior to coaching for UCF, Skladany spent ten years with the Iowa State Cyclones. Sumlin and Skladany followed through with plans to change the Cougars defensive strategy from a 3–4 defense to a 4–3.

Leon Burtnett came from the Washington State Cougars as linebackers coach. New defensive line coach, Jim Jeffcoat spent his last four seasons as defensive ends coach for the NFL's Dallas Cowboys. Another new addition to the staff with NFL coaching experience was special teams coordinator and tight ends coach Tony Levine, who spent his previous two seasons with the Carolina Panthers.

=== Spring practices ===
From March 8 to April 12, 2008, the Cougars held Spring practices. In addition to the fourteen practices held throughout this period, the Cougars held two scrimmages, and concluded with the annual "Red-White Game". The Red-White Game, a home exhibition game between the offensive and defensive players of the Cougars, was a part of festivities held for the University of Houston's "Cougar Fest". A skydive by the U.S. Army Golden Knights to present the game ball was planned, but was canceled due to high winds.

== Games summaries ==
=== Southern ===
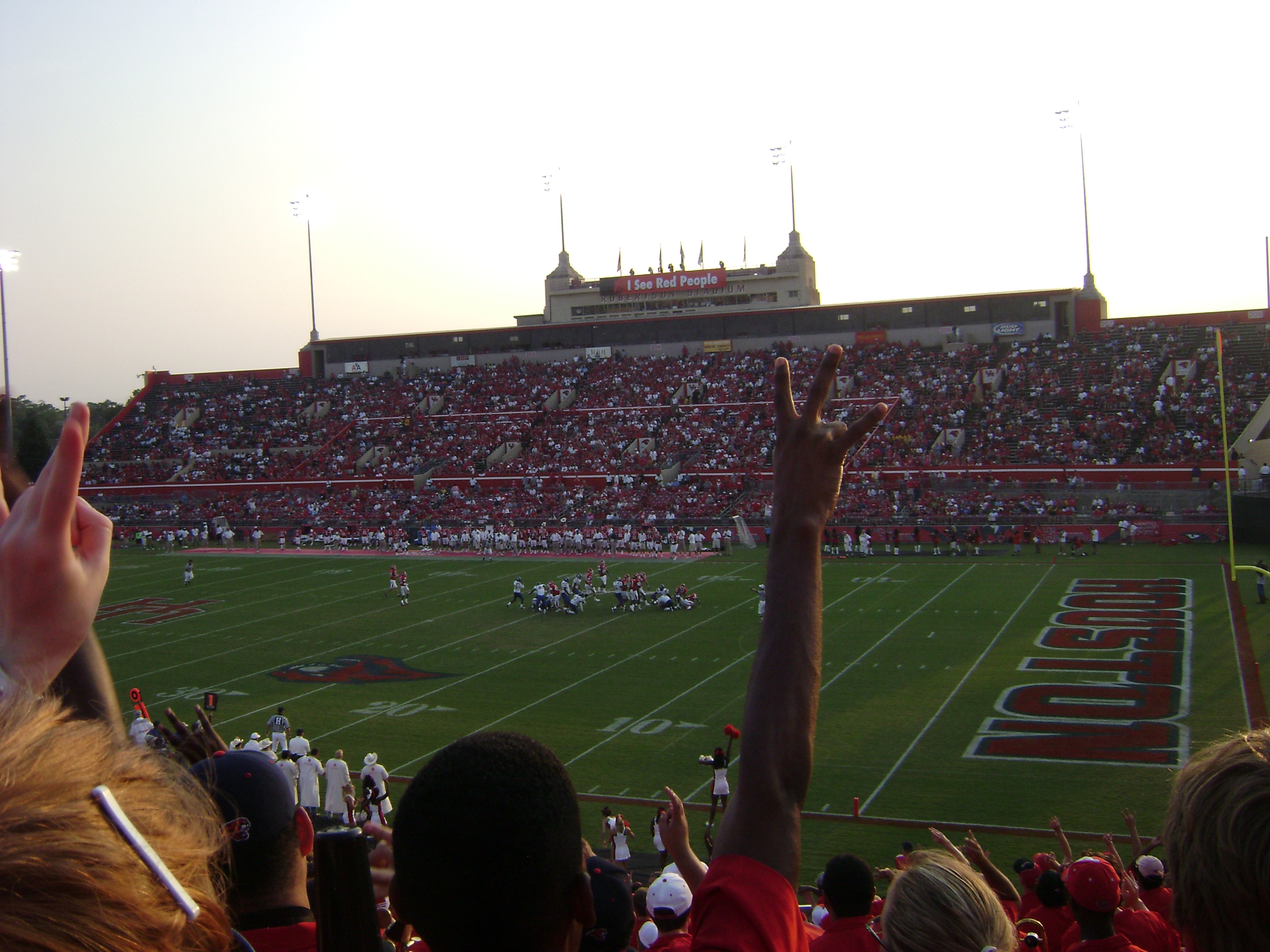
2008 opening season game against the Southern Jaguars at Robertson Stadium

	1	2	3	4	Total
Southern	0	3	0	0	3
Houston	7	31	10	7	55

The 2008 game marked the first meeting between the Houston Cougars and the Southern Jaguars. The team played in the Southwestern Athletic Conference (SWAC) as a member of the NCAA Division I Football Championship Subdivision (FBS). The Grambling Tigers, the Jaguars' main rival, fell to the Cougars as part of their 2006 season schedule 42–22. In 2007, the Cougars finished their regular season by defeating another SWAC opponent, crosstown Texas Southern Tigers.

=== Oklahoma State ===
	1	2	3	4	Total
Houston	7	9	7	14	37
Oklahoma State	7	7	28	14	56

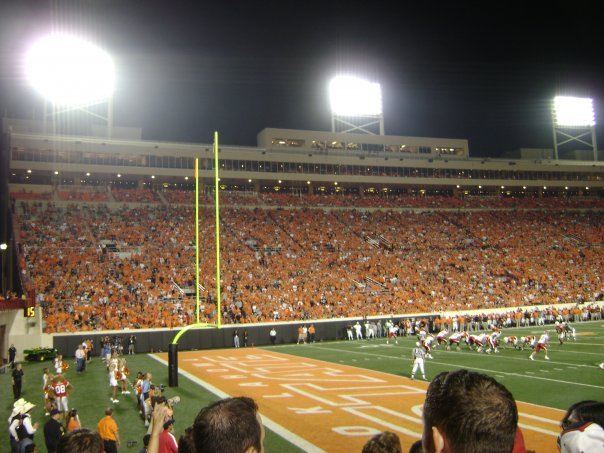
The Cougars and Cowboys face off at Boone Pickens Stadium on September 8, 2008

This marked the 19th game between the Cougars and the Oklahoma State Cowboys who were a member of the Big 12 Conference. Playing against each other since 1951, the Cougars held a 9–8–1 all-time record against the Cowboys, and the last meeting between the two teams was during the 2006 season. During that meeting, the Cowboys fell to the Cougars 34-25. The Cougars traveled to Stillwater for the first time since 1986 to compete. Despite leading the Cowboys during the first half of the game, the Cougars eventually lost 56–37. The Cowboys went on to be consistently ranked this season as one of the top 25 teams in the nation.

=== Air Force ===
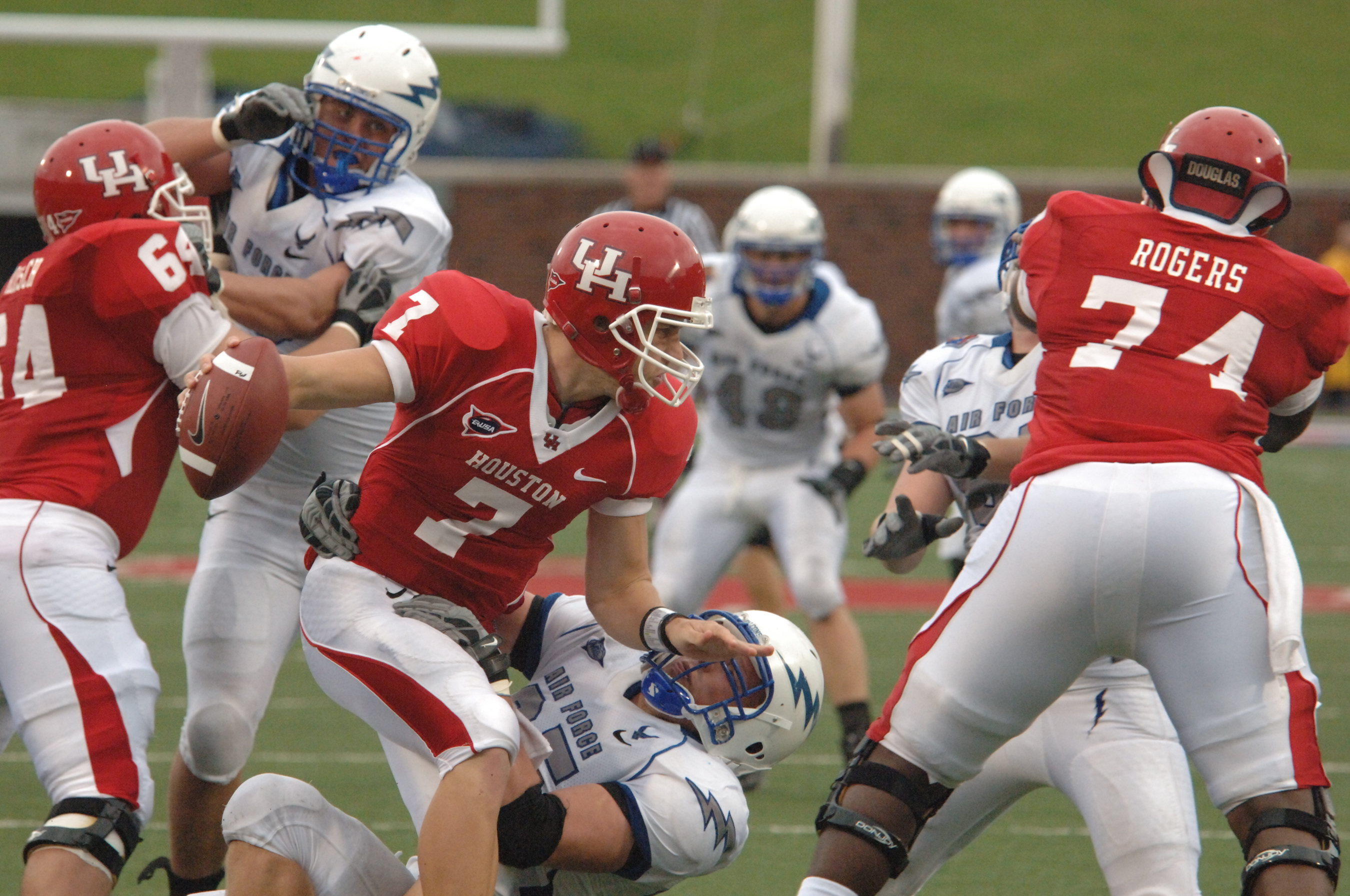
The Cougars versus the Air Force Falcons at Gerald J. Ford Stadium

	1	2	3	4	Total
Air Force	3	14	14	0	31
Houston	7	0	7	14	28

Another first meeting on the Cougars' schedule was with the Air Force Falcons. A member of the Mountain West Conference, the Falcons played football since 1955. The previous season, the Falcons finished with a 9–4 record, while losing to the California Golden Bears in the 2007 Armed Forces Bowl. The game was scheduled to be televised on the CBS College Sports Network as the first of the four nationally televised games for the Cougars season, but was canceled. The game was originally scheduled to be played at Robertson Stadium in Houston, but due to Hurricane Ike, the game was played at SMU's Ford Stadium. The Cougars fell to the Falcons 31-28.

=== Colorado State ===
	1	2	3	4	Total
Houston	0	3	14	8	25
Colorado State	7	14	0	7	28

With a 3-0 all-time record against the Colorado State Rams, the Cougars faced them for the fourth time on the road at Hughes Stadium. The most recent meeting between the teams had been the season before, where the Rams lost to the Cougars 38-27 in Houston. Steve Fairchild, a former player for the Rams, and the former offensive coordinator and under previous head coach Sonny Lubick, had taken over as head coach during this season. With a third consecutive loss, the Cougars fell to the Rams 28-25.

=== East Carolina ===
	1	2	3	4	Total
Houston	14	7	3	17	41
#23 East Carolina	7	3	7	7	24

This game was the ninth meeting between the Cougars and fellow Conference USA team, the East Carolina Pirates. Last season, after defeating the Cougars 37-35, the Pirates went on to finish with an 8-5 record including a win against #24 Boise State in the 2007 Hawaii Bowl. The Pirates led the series between the Cougars 8-5. The game was broadcast on the CBS College Sports Network, and was played at East Carolina's Dowdy–Ficklen Stadium. After beating the #17 Virginia Tech Hokies during their 2008 season opener, the Pirates gained national attention. This continued in their next week of play, as they defeated the #8 West Virginia Mountaineers 24-3, and became ranked by the AP Poll as #14. Despite an upset by the North Carolina State Wolfpack the week before, the Pirates were ranked at #23 by the AP Poll when the Cougars arrived in Greenville. Despite predictions that ECU would win the game, the Cougars managed an upset with a large margin of victory. This was the Cougars' first win over a ranked team since 1996, and the first against a ranked team in a road game since 1984.

=== UAB ===
	1	2	3	4	Total
UAB	3	17	0	0	20
Houston	0	3	21	21	45

The third home game was the seventh meeting between the Cougars and the UAB Blazers. With the most recent game between the two teams being last season, the Blazers led the series 4-2. However, the team was defeated by the Cougars, and finished their 2007 season with a 2–10 record, the worst in the school's history. This followed the departure of Watson Brown to the Tennessee Tech Golden Eagles, and the appointment of former Georgia Bulldogs and Houston Cougars assistant Neil Callaway as head coach. The game was televised by the CBS College Sports Network.

=== SMU ===
	1	2	3	4	Total
Houston	0	14	9	21	44
SMU	14	7	14	3	38

Former Southwest Conference and current Conference USA members, the SMU Mustangs faced the Cougars in their twenty-fourth meeting. The first game between the two teams took place during the 1975 season when Houston joined the Southwest Conference, and the teams have regularly played each other since. The Cougars led the series 13-9-1, including a 38–28 win against the Mustangs last season. This season, June Jones, former Hawaii Warriors head coach took the same position at SMU. At Hawaii, Jones had gained national attention after the Warriors went undefeated, and were invited to the 2008 Sugar Bowl. After the win, the Cougars moved up in the Conference USA standings to tie for first with an undefeated Tulsa in their division.

=== Marshall ===
	1	2	3	4	Total
Houston	0	3	6	14	23
Marshall	3	13	14	7	37

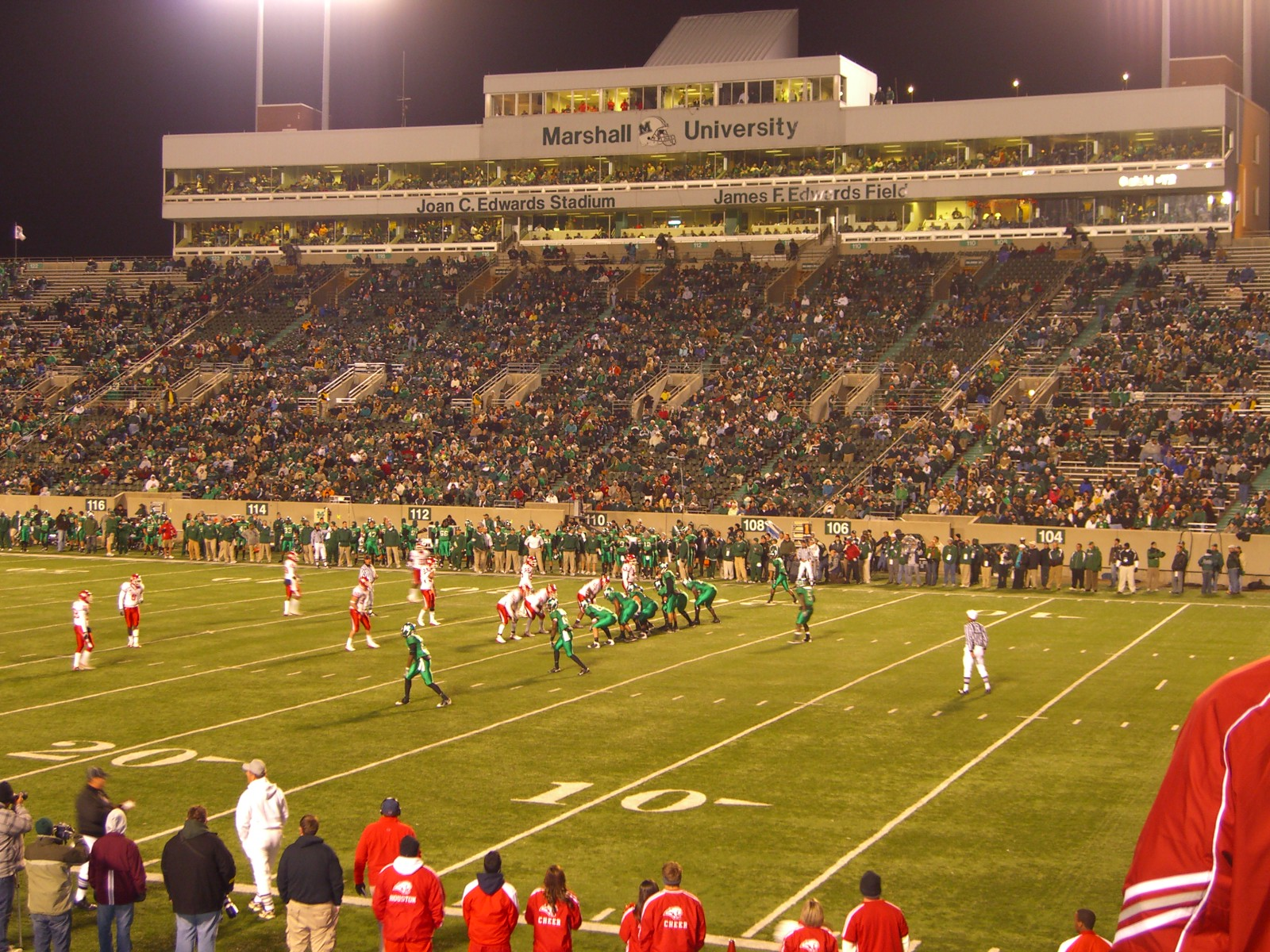
On October 28, the Cougars and Thundering Herd met for the first time ever at Joan C. Edwards Stadium in Huntington, West Virginia

The Marshall Thundering Herd played the Cougars for the second time in history during this season. Their last game against each other was played during the 2007 season, where the Thundering Herd was defeated 35–28 in Houston at Robertson Stadium. This time, Marshall played Houston at home, and won. This marked the first loss for the Cougars in conference play, and dropped them down in conference standings from 1st to 3rd (after Tulsa and Rice). ESPN broadcast the game. Houston wide receiver Patrick Edwards suffered a gruesome broken leg when he collided with an equipment cart at the back of the end zone, though he would return the next season in a starting role.

=== Tulane ===
	1	2	3	4	Total
Tulane	0	7	0	7	14
Houston	7	14	21	0	42

In another conference game, the Tulane Green Wave traveled to Houston to play the Cougars for the fourteenth time. Playing their first game together in 1968, the Cougars led the series 9-4. The teams had competed against each other each consecutive season since 2002, although Tulane hadn't achieved a win against Houston since that same year. Tulane's head coach Bob Toledo returned for his second year with the Green Wave. Although not originally scheduled, the game was televised on CBS College Sports, presumably because Houston's TV appearance against Air Force earlier in the season was canceled. This marked Houston's homecoming game, and was one of the largest attendances for the regular season at Robertson Stadium.

=== Tulsa ===
	1	2	3	4	Total
#25 Tulsa	0	17	13	0	30
Houston	14	28	21	7	70

The Tulsa Golden Hurricane and Houston Cougars faced-off for their thirty-third all-time meeting. Playing together since 1950, Houston had a 17-16 advantage over the Golden Hurricane. In their 2007 season meeting, new coach Todd Graham led the Golden Hurricane to a 56–7 win over the Cougars. It was the Cougars' largest margin of defeat for the season. Tulsa went on to a 10–4 record in the previous season including a 63–7 GMAC Bowl game win against the Bowling Green Falcons. The team held the record for scoring the largest margin in bowl game history. The win was considered an upset by the nation, as Tulsa was ranked as #24 in the Coaches' Poll and #25 in the AP Poll. This marked the second time that the Cougars had beaten a nationally ranked opponent in the season (the other being East Carolina); something Houston hadn't done since its 1984 season under College Football Hall of Fame coach Bill Yeoman.

After the win, the Cougars were again ranked as first in conference play as Tulsa (5–1) had beaten Rice (5–1), and Houston (5–1) had beaten Tulsa. This made Houston's other two regular-season games on the schedule much more significant because if they won both games from this point, they would be allowed to compete in and host the Conference USA Football Championship.

=== UTEP ===
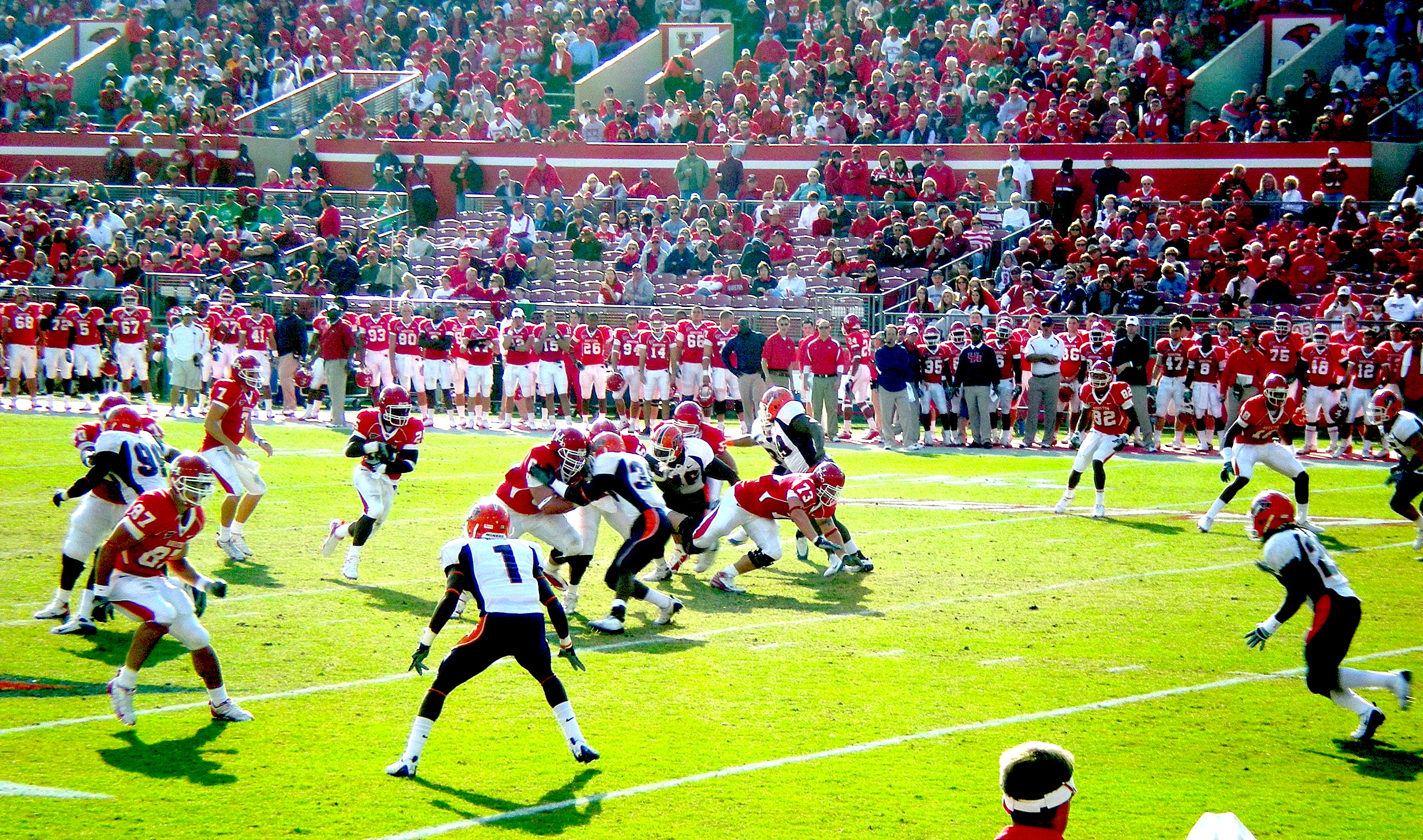
UTEP Miners at Robertson Stadium

	1	2	3	4	Total
UTEP	7	14	7	9	37
Houston	0	9	7	26	42

Although meeting for the first time during the Cougars' inaugural season in 1946, the UTEP Miners had only met with the Cougars five times in history. As Conference USA foes, the Cougars held a 2-3 all-time record against the Miners, whereas both wins came consecutively during the 2006 and 2007 meetings of the teams. Mike Price returned as the Miners' head coach this season. After a close game, where Houston lagged behind, the Cougars made a fourth quarter comeback to win the game.

=== Rice ===
	1	2	3	4	Total
Houston	7	14	7	14	42
Rice	14	21	14	7	56

In the 2008 Bayou Bucket Classic, the Cougars will meet with Rice at Rice Stadium as part of the Houston-Rice rivalry. It will be the 33rd meeting between the two teams, where Houston leads the series 24-9 and have won the last three meetings. During this season, the outcome of the game will have significant influence for the Conference USA West Division title. While Houston remains first in the division, a loss to Rice, and a win for Tulsa (9-2) against Marshall (4-7) would mean Tulsa, not Houston would be headed to compete against the East Division champion East Carolina in the Conference USA Football Championship. If Rice wins its game against the Cougars, and Marshall wins its game against the Golden Hurricane, then Rice would be the West Division champion. The game was picked up by CBS College Sports after Houston's 70-30 blowout victory against Tulsa.

=== Armed Forces Bowl ===
	1	2	3	4	Total
Houston	17	0	7	10	34
Air Force	7	10	3	8	28

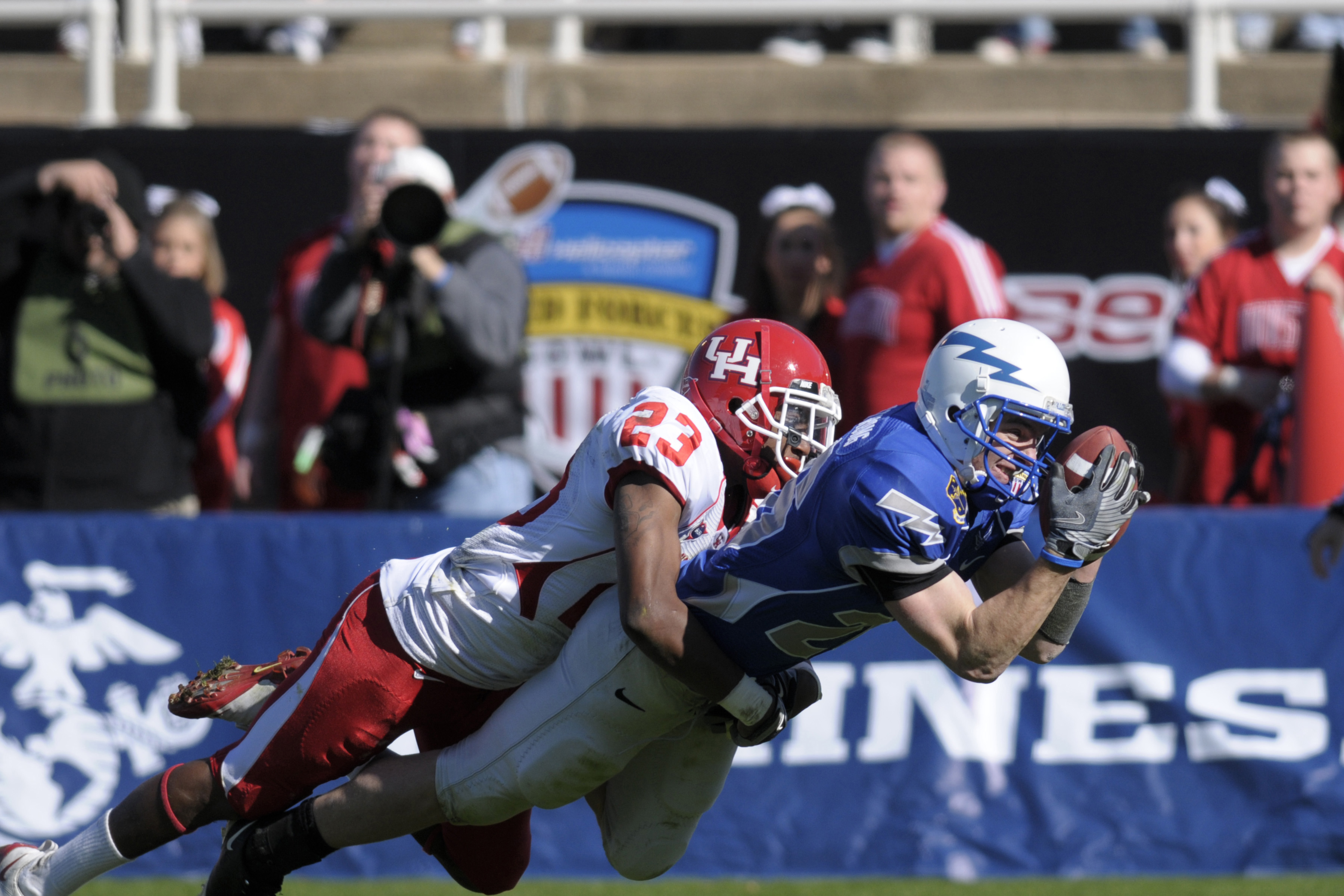
Houston's Carson Blackmon tackles Air Force's Spencer Armstrong after a reception

With seven regular season wins, the Cougars secured bowl eligibility. On December 7, 2008, the Houston Cougars announced that they had been selected to play in the 2008 Armed Forces Bowl game against Air Force in Fort Worth, Texas. This marked the Cougars' fourth consecutive bowl game invitation, and the fifth in six years. The game was a rematch, as the Falcons and the Cougars faced off earlier during the regular season, where the Cougars were defeated. This was the second time in history the Cougars had played a bowl game in Fort Worth; in 2005 the team appeared in the Fort Worth Bowl.

The Cougars defeated the Falcons to win their first bowl game since 1980, and broke the longest current bowl game losing streak in Division I FBS football at that time. The score was 34–28. The game was televised on ESPN.

== Coaching staff ==
Name	Position	Alma mater (year)
Kevin Sumlin	Head coach	Purdue (1986)
Dana Holgorsen	Offensive coordinator	Iowa Wesleyan (1992)
John Skladany	Defensive coordinator	Central Connecticut State (1972)
Jason Phillips	Co-offensive coordinator	Houston (1988)
Leon Burtnett	Linebackers	Southwestern College (1965)
Jim Jeffcoat	Defensive line	Arizona State (1982)
Joe Gilbert	Offensive line	Hamilton (1987)
Tony Levine	Special teams	Minnesota (1996)
Clarence McKinney	Running backs	Mary (1994)
Charles McMillian	Defensive backs	Utah State (1995)
Zac Spavital	Cornerbacks	Murray State (2004)
