= Patrick Edwards =

American football player (born 1988)

No. 83
- Position: Wide receiver

Personal information
- Born: October 25, 1988 (age 38); Temple, Texas, U.S.
- Listed height: 5 ft 9 in (1.75 m)
- Listed weight: 175 lb (79 kg)

Career information
- High school: Hearne (Hearne, Texas)
- College: Houston
- NFL draft: 2012: undrafted

Career history
- Detroit Lions (2012–2014)

Awards and highlights
- Third-team All-American (2011); C-USA Offensive Player of the Year (2011); 2× First-team All-C-USA (2010, 2011); Second-team All-C-USA (2009)

Career NFL statistics
- Receptions: 5
- Receiving yards: 46
- Stats at Pro Football Reference

Patrick Michael Edwards (born October 25, 1988) is an American former professional football player who was a wide receiver for the Detroit Lions of the National Football League (NFL). He played college football for the Houston Cougars.

== Early life ==
Edwards was born in Temple, Texas, to Patrick Dixon and Patricia Edwards. He was raised in Hearne, Texas, where he attended Hearne High School. There, he played baseball, basketball, and football and competed in track and field. In basketball, Edwards was named an All-Region and All-District player, and, in baseball, he was named an All-District player. He played football as a wide receiver, and earned first-team All-State, All-District, and All-Brazos Valley honors.

He was recruited by Baylor, Henderson State, and Houston. He chose the latter, as he had long ambitions to attend the school.

== College career ==
Edwards did not secure a scholarship, but impressed the Cougars' coaches enough in try-outs to earn a walk-on position. He sat out the 2007 season as a redshirt.

He entered the season as a starter at a wide receiver position. During the first eight games of the season, Edwards recorded 46 receptions for 634 receiving yards and four touchdowns. He compiled 100-plus yard games against Oklahoma State, East Carolina, and Southern Methodist. Against UAB, he tallied a season-long 70-yard reception.

For their eighth game of the season, Houston traveled to meet Marshall. The Thundering Herd scored first with a field goal, and never relinquished the lead. In the third quarter, Houston quarterback Blake Joseph threw a long pass into the Marshall end zone. His intended receiver, Edwards, in pursuit of the pass, ran out of the back of the end zone. Just beyond the boundary, he collided with a cart. Running at full speed, Edwards' right leg impacted the object and he flipped over due to the momentum. He suffered a compound fracture of the leg. The cart was one of several that were parked just outside the field's boundary and held equipment for the Marshall band.

Houston athletic director Dave Maggard declined to comment substantively about the situation, but confirmed he would discuss the matter with Marshall officials. Edwards himself considered the burden of responsibility to be with the Conference USA officiating crew, rather than Marshall. Shortly after the incident, he said from the hospital, "They are supposed to check and see if everything is off the field."

On March 30, 2009, Edwards announced that he would return to play the 2009 season and that he intended to pursue legal action against Marshall for his injury.

He still had an extremely productive college stay, racking up 4507 yards and 43 touchdowns on 291 receptions.

In Houston's 73-34 win against the Rice Owls on October 27, 2011, Edwards had 7 receptions for 318 yards and 5 touchdowns. Edwards was named the Conference USA Offensive Player of the Year for the 2011 season.

=== College statistics ===
Year	Team	Receiving				
Year	Team	GP	Rec	Yds	Avg	TD
2008	Houston	8	46	634	13.8	4
2009	Houston	14	85	1,021	12.0	6
2010	Houston	12	71	1,100	15.5	13
2011	Houston	14	89	1,752	19.7	20
Career		48	291	4,507	15.5	43

== Professional career ==
Edwards signed with the Detroit Lions as an undrafted free agent and made the 2013 team roster. He was cut by the Lions on October 14, but was signed to the Lions' practice squad two days later. He was released during Detroit's final cuts in 2014. Later in the 2014 season he was re-signed to the practice squad but was released before the season ended.

== See also ==
- 2008 Houston Cougars football team
- 2009 Houston Cougars football team
- 2010 Houston Cougars football team
- 2011 Houston Cougars football team
- List of NCAA major college football yearly receiving leaders
- List of NCAA Division I FBS career receiving touchdowns leaders
