= 2007 Armed Forces Bowl =

2007 Bell Helicopter Armed Forces Bowl
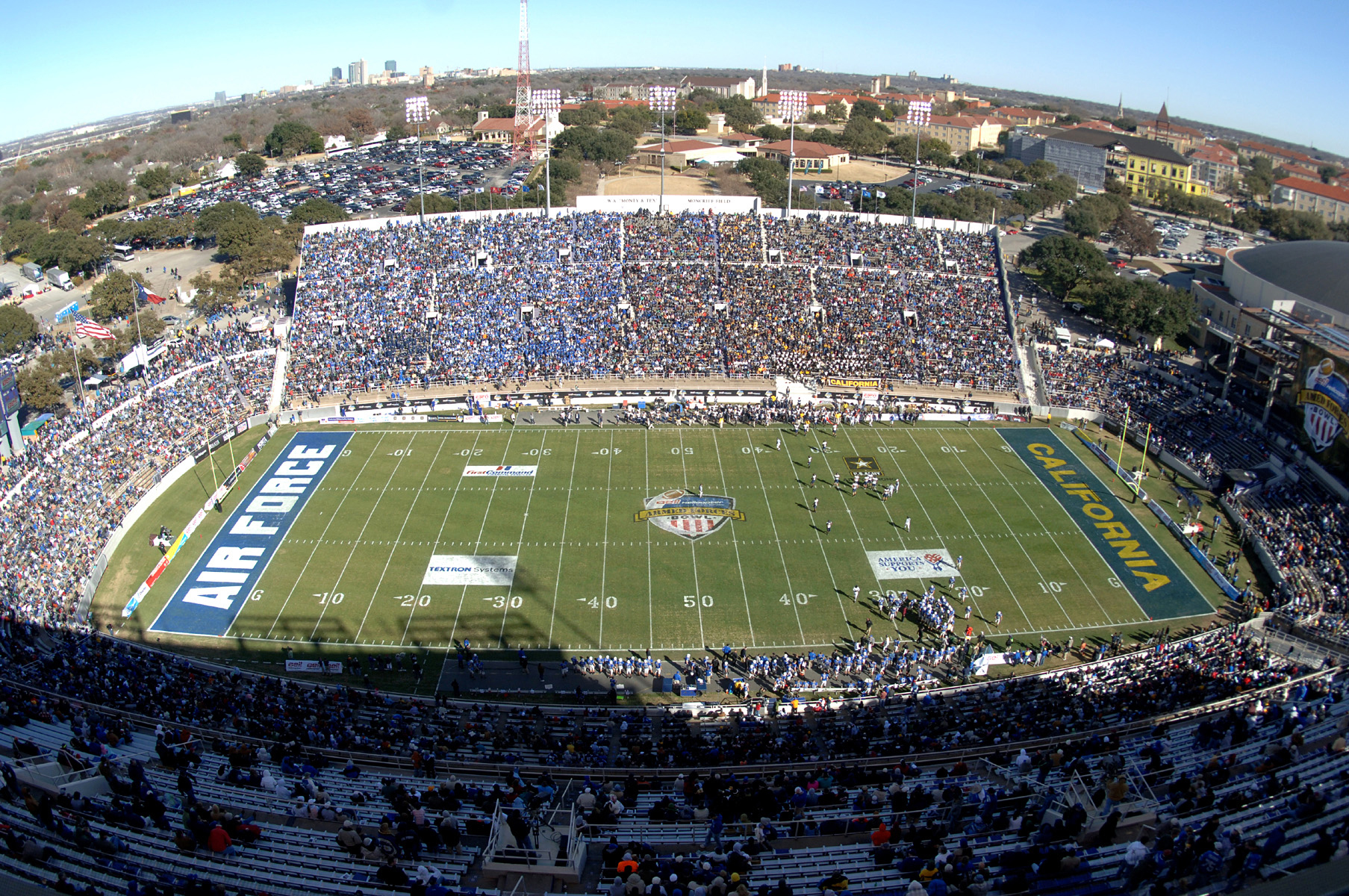
- Amon G. Carter Stadium
California Golden Bears	Air Force Falcons
(6–6)	(9–3)
Pac-10	Mountain West
42	36
Head coach: Jeff Tedford	Head coach: Troy Calhoun
	1	2	3	4	Total
California	0	14	14	14	42
Air Force	14	7	6	9	36
- Date: December 31, 2007
- Season: 2007
- Stadium: Amon G. Carter Stadium
- Location: Fort Worth, Texas
- MVP: Kevin Riley, (QB, Cal) & Shaun Carney (QB, Air Force)
- Favorite: California by 4
- Referee: Marc Curles (SEC)
- Attendance: 40,905
- Payout: US$750,000 per team

United States TV coverage
- Network: ESPN
- Announcers: Dan Fouts, Tim Brant, and Todd Harris

The 2007 Bell Helicopter Armed Forces Bowl was a post-season college football bowl game between the California Golden Bears and the Air Force Falcons played on December 31, 2007, at Amon G. Carter Stadium in Fort Worth, Texas, United States. The game, which the Golden Bears won with a score of 42–36, was part of the 2007 NCAA Division I FBS football season and one of 32 games in the 2007–2008 bowl season.

The Golden Bears began the 2007 season as a favorite to contend for the Pac-10 Conference championship, but after an injury to quarterback Nate Longshore, the team earned a win–loss record of 6–6 for the regular season. The Falcons earned their first bowl bid since 2001 with a 9–3 mark, tied for second in the Mountain West Conference.

== Game summary ==
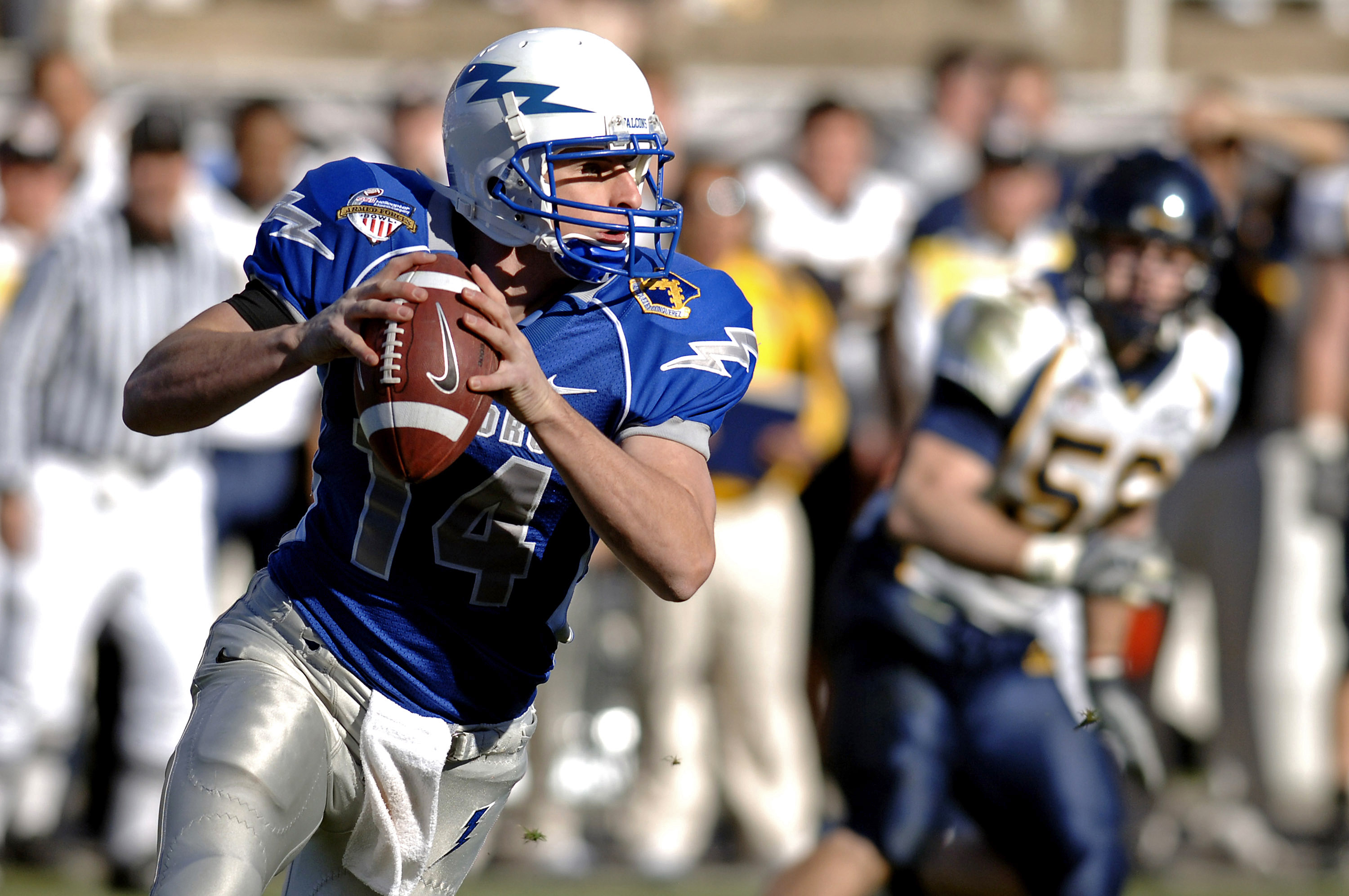
Falcons quarterback Shea Smith looks to pass the ball.

The Golden Bears came out for the game without last names on the backs of their uniforms, a change from their look throughout the season. Prior to the game, Golden Bears players kick returner DeSean Jackson, wide receiver Robert Jordan, and free safety Thomas DeCoud were suspended for the first quarter of the game for violating team rules.

=== First quarter ===
The Golden Bears struggled early against the Falcons. The Bears had trouble in the early going of the game adjusting to the Falcons triple option offense and unpredictable line formations. Golden Bears quarterback Nate Longshore started in the first quarter, but was hampered by the absence of DeSean Jackson and Robert Jordan. Longshore completed 5 of 8 passes for 36 yards in the first quarter.

=== Second quarter ===
As Cal coach Jeff Tedford had planned, backup quarterback Kevin Riley took over for Longshore in the second quarter. Riley completed two touchdown passes to DeSean Jackson and Lavelle Hawkins to make it 21–14 Falcons at the half.

=== Third quarter ===
Air Force quarterback Sean Carney suffered a gruesome lower body injury in the third quarter on a running play and did not return. Backup Shea Smith, who had not played all year, replaced Carney. The Falcons were limited to a pair of field goals, while Robert Jordan caught a pass for a touchdown and Justin Forsett ran in for one.

=== Fourth quarter ===
Forsett rushed for another in the fourth quarter, as did Riley. Air Force was limited to field goals until they capitalized on a botched kickoff return to score a touchdown with just over two minutes left, but failed to recover an onside kick.

== Aftermath ==
Carney finished with one touchdown pass and 108 yards rushing. Alongside Carney, Falcons running back Jim Ollis also eclipsed the 100-yard rushing mark with 101, while Forsett had 140. Riley completed 269 passing yards and was the game MVP. Cal ended the 2007 season with its first win in four games, while handing Air Force their first loss in four games.
