= John Skladany =

American gridiron football player and coach (born 1948)

Biographical details
- Born: September 24, 1948 (age 78); Haverhill, Massachusetts, U.S.

Playing career
- 1968–1972: Central Connecticut
- 1973: Hartford Knights
- 1974: Birmingham Americans
- 1975: Ottawa Rough Riders

Coaching career (HC unless noted)
- 1976: Ohio (GA)
- 1978–1979: Utica HS (OH) (assistant)
- 1980: Merchant Marine (def. assistant)
- 1981–1984: Maine (def. assistant)
- 1985–1989: Ohio (DB)
- 1990–1992: Northern Arizona (DB)
- 1993–1995: Colorado State (DL)
- 1997–2006: Iowa State (DC)
- 2007: UCF (DC)
- 2008–2009: Houston (DC/S)
- 2010: UCF (DRGC/LB)
- 2011: UCF (co-DC)
- 2012–2014: North Texas (DC)

John Skladany (born September 24, 1948) is a retired American football coach. Skladany was the defensive coordinator for the Iowa State Cyclones, Houston Cougars, UCF Knights, and North Texas Mean Green. He retired at the end of the 2014 season.
