= Baylor Bears football statistical leaders =

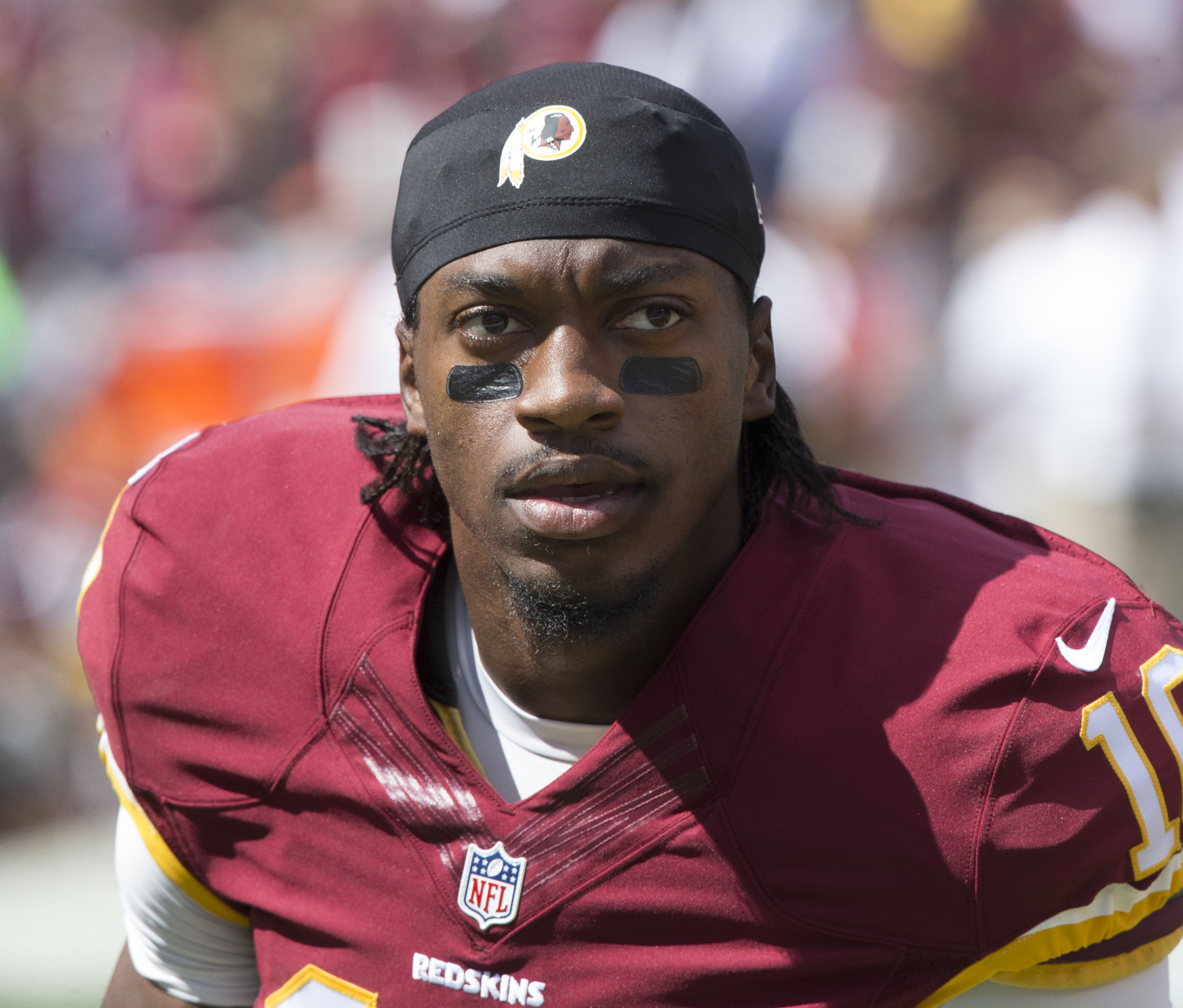
Robert Griffin III is the Bears' career passing and total offense leader.

The Baylor Bears football statistical leaders are individual statistical leaders of the Baylor Bears football program in various categories, including passing, rushing, receiving, total offense, defensive stats, and kicking. Within those areas, the lists identify single-game, single-season, and career leaders. The Bears represent Baylor University in the NCAA Division I FBS Big 12 Conference.

Although Baylor began competing in intercollegiate football in 1898, the school's official record book considers the "modern era" to have begun in 1945. Records from before this year are often incomplete and inconsistent, and they are generally not included in these lists.

These lists are dominated by more recent players for several reasons:

- Since 1945, seasons have increased from 10 games to 11 and then 12 games in length.
- The NCAA didn't allow freshmen to play varsity football until 1972 (with the exception of the World War II years), allowing players to have four-year careers.
- Bowl games only began counting toward single-season and career statistics in 2002. The Bears have played in 9 bowl games since this decision, allowing players to accumulate statistics for an additional game in those seasons.
- Since 2018, players have been allowed to participate in as many as four games in a redshirt season; previously, playing in even one game "burned" the redshirt. Since 2024, postseason games have not counted against the four-game limit. These changes to redshirt rules have given very recent players several extra games to accumulate statistics.
- Due to COVID-19 disruptions, the NCAA did not count the 2020 season against the eligibility of any football player, giving all players active in that season five years of eligibility instead of the normal four.
- Baylor as a team had never accumulated 5,000 yards of total offense during a single season before former head coach Art Briles arrived in 2008. However, since 2010, the Bears have averaged over 7,000 yards per season. Of the 27 offensive lists below, 25 of them include a Briles-era player in first place or a tie for first place.

These lists are updated through the end of the 2025 season.

== Passing ==
=== Passing yards ===
Career
Rank	Player	Yards	Years
1	Robert Griffin III	10,366	2008 2009 2010 2011
2	Charlie Brewer	9,700	2017 2018 2019 2020
3	Bryce Petty	8,195	2011 2012 2013 2014
4	Sawyer Robertson	7,616	2023 2024 2025
5	Nick Florence	6,301	2009 2010 2011 2012
6	J.J. Joe	5,995	1990 1991 1992 1993
7	Shawn Bell	5,666	2003 2004 2005 2006
8	Blake Shapen	5,574	2021 2022 2023
9	Jeff Watson	5,531	1994 1995 1996 1997
10	Seth Russell	5,461	2013 2014 2015 2016

Single season
Rank	Player	Yards	Year
1	Nick Florence	4,309	2012
2	Robert Griffin III	4,293	2011
3	Bryce Petty	4,200	2013
4	Bryce Petty	3,855	2014
5	Sawyer Robertson	3,681	2025
6	Robert Griffin III	3,501	2010
7	Charlie Brewer	3,161	2019
8	Sawyer Robertson	3,071	2024
8	Charlie Brewer	3,019	2018
9	Blake Szymanski	2,844	2007
10	Blake Shapen	2,790	2022

Single game
Rank	Player	Yards	Year	Opponent
1	Nick Florence	581	2012	West Virginia
2	Bryce Petty	550	2014	Michigan State (Cotton Bowl)
3	Bryce Petty	510	2014	TCU
4	Robert Griffin III	479	2011	Oklahoma
5	Zach Smith	463	2017	Oklahoma
6	Sawyer Robertson	445	2024	LSU
7	Sawyer Robertson	440	2025	SMU
8	Seth Russell	438	2014	Northwestern State
9	Robert Griffin III	430	2011	Texas A&M
	Bryce Petty	430	2013	Kansas
	Sawyer Robertson	430	2025	Utah

=== Passing touchdowns ===
Career
Rank	Player	TDs	Years
1	Robert Griffin III	78	2008 2009 2010 2011
2	Charlie Brewer	65	2017 2018 2019 2020
3	Bryce Petty	62	2011 2012 2013 2014
4	Sawyer Robertson	61	2023 2024 2025
5	Seth Russell	60	2013 2014 2015 2016
6	Nick Florence	41	2009 2010 2011 2012
7	Shawn Bell	38	2003 2004 2005 2006
8	Blake Shapen	36	2021 2022 2023
9	Cody Carlson	32	1983 1984 1985 1986
10	J.J. Joe	31	1990 1991 1992 1993

Single season
Rank	Player	TDs	Year
1	Robert Griffin III	37	2011
2	Nick Florence	33	2012
3	Bryce Petty	32	2013
4	Sawyer Robertson	31	2025
5	Bryce Petty	29	2014
6	Seth Russell	29	2015
7	Sawyer Robertson	28	2024
8	Blake Szymanski	22	2007
	Robert Griffin III	22	2010
10	Charlie Brewer	21	2019

Single game
Rank	Player	TDs	Year	Opponent
1	Blake Szymanski	6	2007	Rice
	Bryce Petty	6	2014	TCU
	Seth Russell	6	2015	Rice
4	Shawn Bell	5	2006	Kansas
	Blake Szymanski	5	2007	Texas State
	Robert Griffin III	5	2011	TCU
	Robert Griffin III	5	2011	Rice
	Robert Griffin III	5	2011	Kansas State
	Nick Florence	5	2012	West Virginia
	Seth Russell	5	2015	SMU
	Seth Russell	5	2015	West Virginia
	Sawyer Robertson	5	2024	Texas Tech

== Rushing ==
=== Rushing yards ===
Career
Rank	Player	Yards	Years
1	Shock Linwood	4,213	2013 2014 2015 2016
2	Walter Abercrombie	3,665	1978 1979 1980 1981
3	Jerod Douglas	2,811	1994 1995 1996 1997
4	Jay Finley	2,660	2007 2008 2009 2010
5	Alfred Anderson	2,424	1980 1981 1982 1983
6	Robert Griffin III	2,254	2008 2009 2010 2011
7	Darrell Bush	2,249	1997 1998 1999 2000
8	Dennis Gentry	2,231	1977 1979 1980 1981
9	Lache Seastrunk	2,189	2012 2013
10	David Mims	2,060	1989 1990 1991 1992

Single season
Rank	Player	Yards	Year
1	Abram Smith	1,621	2021
2	Terrance Ganaway	1,547	2011
3	Shock Linwood	1,329	2015
4	Shock Linwood	1,252	2014
5	Jay Finley	1,218	2010
6	Walter Abercrombie	1,187	1981
7	Lache Seastrunk	1,177	2013
8	Jerod Douglas	1,114	1995
9	Cleveland Franklin	1,112	1976
10	Steve Beaird	1,104	1978

Single game
Rank	Player	Yards	Year	Opponent
1	Johnny Jefferson	299	2015	North Carolina (Russell Athletic Bowl)
2	Jay Finley	250	2010	Kansas State
3	Terrance Ganaway	246	2011	Texas Tech
4	Shock Linwood	237	2016	Iowa State
5	Shock Linwood	221	2015	Texas Tech
6	Robert Griffin III	217	2008	Washington State
7	Jerod Douglas	210	1994	Texas
8	Walter Abercrombie	207	1978	Texas A&M
9	Terrance Ganaway	200	2011	Iowa State
	Terrance Ganaway	200	2011	Washington (Alamo Bowl)

=== Rushing touchdowns ===
Career
Rank	Player	TDs	Years
1	Shock Linwood	36	2013 2014 2015 2016
2	Alfred Anderson	35	1980 1981 1982 1983
3	Robert Griffin III	33	2008 2009 2010 2011
4	Robert Strait	32	1990 1991 1992 1993
5	Terrance Ganaway	28	2009 2010 2011
6	Glasco Martin	25	2010 2011 2012 2013
7	Walter Abercrombie	24	1978 1979 1980 1981
8	Jay Finley	22	2007 2008 2009 2010
	Charlie Brewer	22	2017 2018 2019 2020
10	Bryce Petty	21	2011 2012 2013 2014
	Devin Chafin	21	2013 2014 2015

Single season
Rank	Player	TDs	Year
1	Terrance Ganaway	21	2011
2	Shock Linwood	16	2014
3	Glasco Martin	15	2012
4	Bryce Petty	14	2013
	Richard Reese	14	2022
6	Steve Beaird	13	1974
	Robert Griffin III	13	2008
8	Jay Finley	12	2010
	Abram Smith	12	2021
	Bryson Washington	12	2024

Single game
Rank	Player	TDs	Year	Opponent
1	Jonathan Golden	5	2002	Samford
	Terrance Ganaway	5	2011	Washington (Alamo Bowl)

== Receiving ==
=== Receptions ===
Career
Rank	Player	Rec	Years
1	Kendall Wright	302	2008 2009 2010 2011
2	Terrance Williams	202	2009 2010 2011 2012
3	K. D. Cannon	195	2013 2014 2015 2016
4	Tevin Reese	187	2010 2011 2012 2013
5	Denzel Mims	186	2016 2017 2018 2019
6	Reggie Newhouse	183	1999 2000 2001 2002
7	Corey Coleman	173	2013 2014 2015
8	Josh Cameron	170	2022 2023 2024 2025
9	Dominique Zeigler	166	2003 2004 2005 2006
10	Lanear Sampson	165	2009 2010 2011 2012

Single season
Rank	Player	Rec	Year
1	Kendall Wright	108	2011
2	Terrance Williams	97	2012
3	K. D. Cannon	87	2016
4	Kendall Wright	78	2010
5	Reggie Newhouse	75	2002
6	Corey Coleman	74	2015
7	Antwan Goodley	71	2013
8	Lawrence Elkins	70	1963
9	Jalen Hurd	69	2018
	Josh Cameron	69	2025

Single game
Rank	Player	Rec	Year	Opponent
1	Terrance Williams	17	2012	West Virginia
2	Corey Coleman	15	2014	Oklahoma
3	K. D. Cannon	14	2016	Boise State (Cactus Bowl)
4	Terrance Williams	13	2012	Iowa State
	Josh Cameron	13	2025	Utah
6	11 times by 10 players	12	Most recent: Gavin Freeman, 2026 vs. Auburn	

=== Receiving yards ===
Career
Rank	Player	Yards	Years
1	Kendall Wright	4,004	2008 2009 2010 2011
2	Terrance Williams	3,334	2009 2010 2011 2012
3	K. D. Cannon	3,113	2013 2014 2015 2016
4	Tevin Reese	3,102	2010 2011 2012 2013
5	Corey Coleman	3,009	2013 2014 2015
6	Denzel Mims	2,925	2016 2017 2018 2019
7	Gerald McNeil	2,651	1980 1981 1982 1983
8	Antwan Goodley	2,366	2011 2012 2013 2014
9	Reggie Newhouse	2,552	1999 2000 2001 2002
10	Tyquan Thornton	2,242	2018 2019 2020 2021

Single season
Rank	Player	Yards	Year
1	Terrance Williams	1,832	2012
2	Kendall Wright	1,663	2011
3	Corey Coleman	1,363	2015
4	Antwan Goodley	1,339	2013
5	K. D. Cannon	1,215	2016
6	Reggie Newhouse	1,140	2002
7	Corey Coleman	1,119	2014
8	Denzel Mims	1,087	2017
9	Gerald McNeil	1,034	1983
10	K. D. Cannon	1,030	2014

Single game
Rank	Player	Yards	Year	Opponent
1	Terrance Williams	314	2012	West Virginia
2	K. D. Cannon	226	2016	Boise State (Cactus Bowl)
3	Corey Coleman	224	2014	Oklahoma
4	K. D. Cannon	223	2014	Northwestern State
5	Corey Coleman	216	2015	Kansas State
6	K. D. Cannon	213	2016	Rice
7	K. D. Cannon	210	2015	Oklahoma State
	Gavin Holmes	210	2022	West Virginia
9	Kendall Wright	208	2011	Oklahoma
10	Kendall Wright	201	2011	Kansas State

=== Receiving touchdowns ===
Career
Rank	Player	TDs	Years
1	Corey Coleman	33	2013 2014 2015
2	Kendall Wright	30	2008 2009 2010 2011
3	Denzel Mims	28	2016 2017 2018 2019
4	Terrance Williams	27	2009 2010 2011 2012
	K. D. Cannon	27	2013 2014 2015 2016
6	Tevin Reese	24	2010 2011 2012 2013
7	Antwan Goodley	21	2011 2012 2013 2014
8	Lawrence Elkins	19	1962 1963 1964
	Melvin Bonner	19	1989 1990 1991 1992
	Tyquan Thornton	19	2018 2019 2020 2021
	Josh Cameron	19	2022 2023 2024 2025

Single season
Rank	Player	TDs	Year
1	Corey Coleman	20	2015
2	Kendall Wright	14	2011
3	Antwan Goodley	13	2013
	K. D. Cannon	13	2016
5	Terrance Williams	12	2012
	Denzel Mims	12	2019
7	Melvin Bonner	11	1992
	Terrance Williams	11	2011
	Corey Coleman	11	2014
10	Tyquan Thornton	10	2021
	Josh Cameron	10	2024

Single game
Rank	Player	TDs	Year	Opponent
1	Corey Coleman	4	2015	Lamar
2	Lawrence Elkins	3	1963	Texas A&M
	Melvin Bonner	3	1992	Utah State
	Melvin Bonner	3	1992	TCU
	Reggie Newhouse	3	2001	Missouri
	Kendall Wright	3	2011	Kansas State
	K. D. Cannon	3	2014	Northwestern State
	Jay Lee	3	2015	SMU
	Corey Coleman	3	2015	Rice
	Corey Coleman	3	2015	Texas Tech
	Corey Coleman	3	2015	West Virginia
	Denzel Mims	3	2017	Oklahoma
	Denzel Mims	3	2019	UTSA
	Josh Cameron	3	2024	Texas Tech

== Total offense ==
Total offense is the sum of passing and rushing statistics. It does not include receiving or returns.

=== Total offense yards ===
Career
Rank	Player	Yards	Years
1	Robert Griffin III	12,620	2008 2009 2010 2011
2	Charlie Brewer	10,739	2017 2018 2019 2020
3	Bryce Petty	8,533	2011 2012 2013 2014
4	Sawyer Robertson	7,932	2023 2024 2025
5	Nick Florence	6,952	2009 2010 2011 2012
6	J.J. Joe	6,815	1990 1991 1992 1993
7	Seth Russell	6,701	2013 2014 2015 2016
8	Cody Carlson	5,835	1983 1984 1985 1986
9	Blake Shapen	5,752	2021 2022 2023
10	Jeff Watson	5,682	1994 1995 1996 1997

Single season
Rank	Player	Yards	Year
1	Robert Griffin III	4,992	2011
2	Nick Florence	4,877	2012
3	Bryce Petty	4,409	2013
4	Robert Griffin III	4,136	2010
5	Bryce Petty	3,956	2014
6	Sawyer Robertson	3,698	2025
7	Charlie Brewer	3,505	2019
8	Charlie Brewer	3,394	2018
9	Sawyer Robertson	3,301	2024
10	Blake Szymanski	2,942	2007

Single game
Rank	Player	Yards	Year	Opponent
1	Nick Florence	575	2012	West Virginia
2	Robert Griffin III	551	2011	Oklahoma
3	Seth Russell	540	2015	West Virginia
4	Bryce Petty	533	2014	TCU
5	Bryce Petty	514	2014	Michigan State
6	Charlie Brewer	493	2018	Vanderbilt
7	Sawyer Robertson	460	2025	SMU
8	Robert Griffin III	459	2011	Missouri
9	Nick Florence	456	2012	Iowa State
10	Robert Griffin III	452	2011	Oklahoma State
	Bryce Petty	452	2013	Kansas

=== Touchdowns responsible for ===
"Touchdowns responsible for" is the NCAA's official term for combined passing and rushing touchdowns.

Career
Rank	Player	TDs	Years
1	Robert Griffin III	111	2008 2009 2010 2011
2	Charlie Brewer	87	2017 2018 2019 2020
3	Bryce Petty	83	2011 2012 2013 2014
4	Seth Russell	80	2013 2014 2015 2016
5	Sawyer Robertson	69	2023 2024 2025
6	Nick Florence	55	2009 2010 2011 2012
7	J.J. Joe	43	1990 1991 1992 1993
8	Blake Shapen	42	2021 2022 2023
9	Don Trull	41	1961 1962 1963
10	Shawn Bell	39	2003 2004 2005 2006

Single season
Rank	Player	TDs	Year
1	Robert Griffin III	47	2011
2	Bryce Petty	46	2013
3	Nick Florence	43	2012
4	Bryce Petty	35	2014
	Seth Russell	35	2015
6	Sawyer Robertson	34	2025
7	Charlie Brewer	32	2019
	Sawyer Robertson	32	2024
9	Robert Griffin III	30	2010
10	Robert Griffin III	28	2008
	Seth Russell	28	2016

Single game
Rank	Player	TDs	Year	Opponent
1	Blake Szymanski	6	2007	Rice
	Robert Griffin III	6	2011	Rice
	Nick Florence	6	2012	West Virginia
	Bryce Petty	6	2014	TCU
	Seth Russell	6	2015	SMU
	Seth Russell	6	2015	Rice
	Seth Russell	6	2015	Texas Tech
	Seth Russell	6	2015	West Virginia

== Defense ==
=== Interceptions ===
Career
Rank	Player	Ints	Years
1	Vann McElroy	16	1978 1979 1980 1981
	Mike Welch	16	1986 1987 1989 1990
3	George Sims	15	1945 1946 1947 1948
4	Ron Francis	14	1984 1985 1986
	Robert Blackmon	14	1986 1987 1988 1989
6	Robert Reid	13	1950 1951
7	Thomas Everett	12	1983 1984 1985 1986
	Michael McFarland	12	1989 1990 1991 1992
	Orion Stewart	12	2013 2014 2015 2016
10	Adrian Robinson	11	1993 1994 1995

Single season
Rank	Player	Ints	Year
1	Robert Reid	11	1951
2	George Sims	8	1947
	Vann McElroy	8	1980
	Ron Francis	8	1986
	Robert Blackmon	8	1989
6	George Sims	7	1948
	Mike Welch	7	1990
8	Bobby Griffin	6	1949
	John Miller	6	1969
	Ron Francis	6	1985
	Michael McFarland	6	1991
	Joe Pawelek	6	2008
	Orion Stewart	6	2016
	Grayland Arnold	6	2019
	JT Woods	6	2021

Single game
Rank	Player	Ints	Year	Opponent
1	Bobby Griffin	3	1949	TCU
	Mike Nelms	3	1975	Rice
	Howard Fields	3	1977	Air Force
	Kevin Hancock	3	1984	Rice
	Ron Francis	3	1986	Texas
	Mike Welch	3	1987	Rice
	Robert Blackmon	3	1989	Texas

=== Tackles ===
Career
Rank	Player	Tackles	Years
1	Mike Singletary	662	1977 1978 1979 1980
2	Joe Pawelek	422	2006 2007 2008 2009
3	Ray Berry	380	1983 1984 1985 1986
4	Maurice Lane	365	2002 2003 2004 2005
5	Kris Micheaux	351	1997 1998 1999 2000
6	James Francis	334	1986 1987 1988 1989
7	Doak Field	330	1977 1978 1979 1980
8	Thomas Everett	325	1983 1984 1985 1986
9	Jordan Lake	324	2006 2007 2008 2009
10	Gary Joe Kinne	323	1986 1987 1988 1989

Single season
Rank	Player	Tackles	Year
1	Mike Singletary	232	1978
2	Mike Singletary	188	1979
3	Mike Singletary	145	1980
4	Jerry Harrison	144	1977
5	Geff Gandy	137	1982
6	Mike Welch	131	1987
7	James Francis	129	1989
	Maurice Lane	129	2003
9	Joe Pawelek	128	2008
10	LaCurtis Jones	126	1994

Single game
Rank	Player	Tackles	Year	Opponent
1	Mike Singletary	33	1978	Arkansas

=== Sacks ===
Career
Rank	Player	Sacks	Years
1	James Lynch	22.0	2017 2018 2019
2	Shawn Oakman	17.5	2012 2013 2014 2015
3	Terrel Bernard	16.5	2018 2019 2020 2021
4	Daryl Gardener	15.0	1992 1993 1994 1995
	Chris McAllister	15.0	2010 2011 2012 2013
6	Scotty Lewis	14.0	1990 1992 1993 1994
7	James Francis	13.5	1986 1987 1988 1989
	Matthew Pearson	13.5	1991 1992
9	John Garrett	13.0	2000 2001 2002 2003
	Jamal Palmer	13.0	2012 2013 2014 2015

Single season
Rank	Player	Sacks	Year
1	James Lynch	13.5	2019
2	Shawn Oakman	11.0	2014
3	Matthew Pearson	10.5	1992
4	John Garrett	10.0	2003
5	Charles Benson	8.5	1982
6	Terrel Bernard	7.5	2021
7	Kent Townsend	7.0	1983
	Robin Jones	7.0	1991
	Albert Fontenot	7.0	1992
	Scotty Lewis	7.0	1993
	K. J. Smith	7.0	2016

Single game
Rank	Player	Sacks	Year	Opponent
1	Kent Townsend	4.0	1983	UTEP

== Kicking ==
=== Field goals made ===
Career
Rank	Player	FGs	Years
1	Aaron Jones	59	2010 2011 2012 2013
2	Isaiah Hankins	46	2021 2022 2023 2024
3	Jeff Ireland	45	1988 1989 1990 1991
4	Terry Syler	38	1985 1986 1987 1988
5	Chris Callahan	36	2014 2015 2016
6	Connor Martin	35	2016 2017 2018
7	John Mayers	34	2018 2019 2020 2022
8	Robert Bledsoe	31	1977 1978 1979 1980
	Marty Jimmerson	31	1981 1982 1983 1984
10	Jarvis Van Dyke	29	1993 1994 1995

Single season
Rank	Player	FGs	Year
1	Connor Martin	20	2017
2	Aaron Jones	19	2010
3	Jeff Ireland	18	1989
	Chris Callahan	18	2014
	Isaiah Hankins	18	2023
	Connor Hawkins	18	2025
7	Ryan Havens	16	2005
	Aaron Jones	16	2012
	John Mayers	16	2019
10	Marty Jimmerson	15	1981
	Connor Martin	15	2018

Single game
Rank	Player	FGs	Year	Opponent
1	Bubba Hicks	4	1975	Rice
	Marty Jimmerson	4	1981	Texas A&M
	Marty Jimmerson	4	1984	Rice
	Jeff Ireland	4	1988	UNLV
	Jarvis Van Dyke	4	1995	Houston
	Chris Callahan	4	2014	TCU
	Chris Callahan	4	2014	Kansas
	Connor Martin	4	2017	Oklahoma
	Isaiah Hankins	4	2023	Cincinnati

Longest Field Goal Made
Rank	Player	Yards	Year	Opponent
1	Bubba Hicks	60	1975	Rice
2	Jeff Ireland	58	1991	Rice
	Aaron Jones	58	2012	Oklahoma
4	Isaiah Hankins	54	2023	Cincinnati
	Connor Hawkins	54	2025	Houston
	Rhett Armstrong	54	2026	Colorado
7	Isaiah Hankins	53	2023	Texas State
	Connor Hawkins	53	2025	Arizona State
	Connor Hawkins	53	2025	Kansas State
10	John Mayers	51	2019	TCU
	Isaiah Hankins	51	2024	Air Force

=== Field goal percentage ===
Career
Rank	Player	FG%	Years
1	Connor Hawkins	78.3%	2024 2025
2	John Mayers	75.6%	2018 2019 2020 2022
3	Terry Syler	73.1%	1985 1986 1987 1988
4	Ryan Havens	73.0%	2003 2004 2005 2006
5	Connor Martin	72.9%	2016 2017 2018
6	Matt Bryant	72.4%	1997 1998
7	Marty Jimmerson	72.1%	1981 1982 1983 1984
8	Isaiah Hankins	70.8%	2021 2022 2023 2024
9	Chris Callahan	66.7%	2014 2015 2016
	Carl Choate	66.7%	1961 1962

Single season
Rank	Player	FG%	Year
1	Marty Jimmerson	85.7%	1984
2	Terry Syler	84.6%	1985
3	John Mayers	84.2%	2019
4	Connor Martin	83.3%	2017
5	Connor Hawkins	81.8%	2025
6	Mike Conradt	80.0%	1970
	Matt Bryant	80.0%	1998
8	Ryan Havens	78.6%	2006
9	Robert Bledsoe	76.5%	1979
10	Jeff Ireland	75.0%	1989
