= 2012 Holiday Bowl =

2012 Bridgepoint Education Holiday Bowl
- 35th Holiday Bowl Game
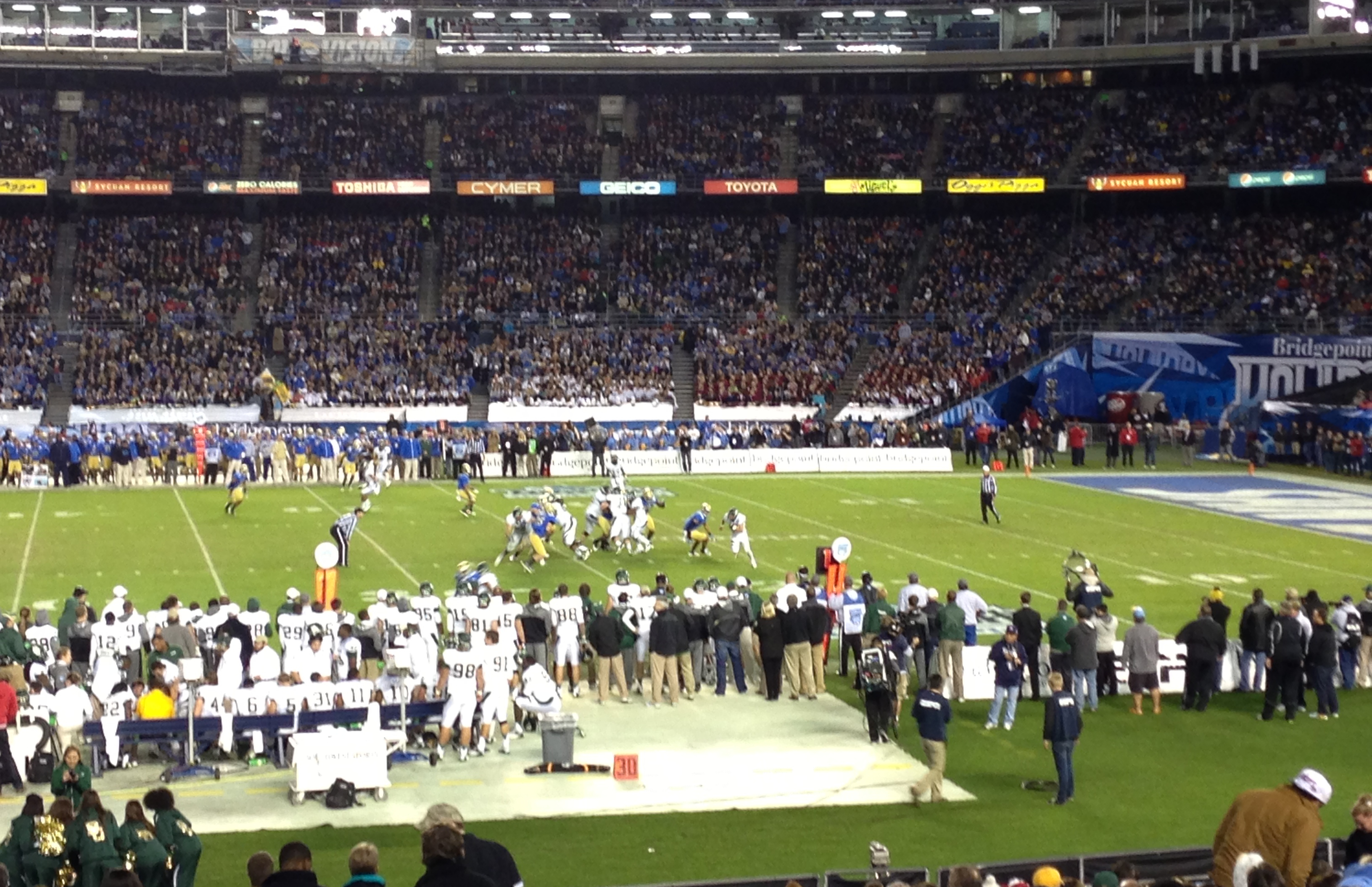
Baylor Bears	UCLA Bruins
(7–5)	(9–4)
Big 12	Pac-12
49	26
Head coach: Art Briles	Head coach: Jim L. Mora
AP / Coaches / BCS; NR / NR / NR	AP / Coaches / BCS; 17 / 19 / 17
	1	2	3	4	Total
Baylor	14	21	7	7	49
UCLA	0	10	3	13	26
- Date: December 27, 2012
- Season: 2012
- Stadium: Qualcomm Stadium
- Location: San Diego, California
- MVP: Offense: Lache Seastrunk; Defense: Chris McAllister
- Favorite: UCLA by 1
- Referee: Wayne Winkler (C-USA)
- Attendance: 55,507
- Payout: US$2.075 million per team

United States TV coverage
- Network: ESPN
- Announcers: Dave Pasch (Play-by-play); Brian Griese (Analyst); Jenn Brown (Sideline)

The 2012 Bridgepoint Education Holiday Bowl, the 35th edition of the game, was a postseason American college football bowl game between the Baylor Bears from the Big 12 Conference and the UCLA Bruins from the Pac-12 Conference (Pac-12), played on December 27, 2012, at Qualcomm Stadium in San Diego, California. The game was the final contest of the 2012 NCAA Division I-Football Bowl Subdivision (Division I-FBS) football season for both teams. The game kicked off at 6:45 p.m. PT and was broadcast on both ESPN TV and ESPN Radio. This is the first Holiday Bowl appearance for both Baylor and UCLA, as well as the first-ever meeting between the two teams. It also marks the first time one of the Pac-12's Southern California teams has played in the Holiday Bowl.

== Teams ==
=== Baylor ===
The Baylor Bears, winning their last three games, are among the best in the country, averaging 578.8 yards per game (first), averaging 353.3 yards passing (third), and averaging 44.1 points per game (fifth). They defeated then-No. 1 ranked Kansas State Wildcats 52–24 on November 17. Its Quarterback Nick Florence has passed for 4,121 yards for 31 touchdowns this season, and rushed for a gain of 531 yards and nine touchdowns. Baylor is rated 117th in the country in scoring defense, allowing 62 touchdowns, 8 field goals for 458 points.

=== UCLA ===
For the third time this season, the UCLA Bruins will be playing against a team that has defeated a No. 1 ranked team in the country. They lost the last two games to the Stanford Cardinal who defeated the then No. 1 rated Oregon Ducks on November 17.

The Bruins are led by quarterback Brett Hundley and senior running back Johnathan Franklin. Franklin, the school's all-time leading rusher, has carried the ball 268 times for 1,700 yards and 13 touchdowns. He also has 32 receptions for 319 yards. Hundley has completed 292 passes for 3411 yards and for 26 touchdowns. Additionally, he has run for 365 yards for nine touchdowns.

Defensively, UCLA is led by Eric Kendricks and Anthony Barr. Kendricks is fifth in the nation with 137 tackles and has 10 or more tackles in eight games this season. Barr leads the nation with 13.5 sacks and has 20.5 total tackles for loss. He is credited with four forced fumbles and two blocked kicks.

== Game summary ==
=== Scoring summary ===
Scoring summary

Quarter	Time	Drive			Team	Scoring information	Score	
Quarter	Time	Plays	Yards	TOP	Team	Scoring information	Baylor	UCLA
1	8:01	6	53	1:43	Baylor	Glasco Martin 4-yard touchdown run, Aaron Jones kick good	7	0
1	4:22	7	84	3:04	Baylor	Antwan Goodley 8-yard touchdown reception from Nick Florence, Aaron Jones kick good	14	0
2	11:08	5	76	1:36	Baylor	Tevin Reese 55-yard touchdown reception from Nick Florence, Aaron Jones kick good	21	0
2	6:21	2	21	0:34	UCLA	Joseph Fauria 22-yard touchdown reception from Brett Hundley, Kaʻimi Fairbairn kick good	21	7
2	4:36	7	75	1:45	Baylor	Glasco Martin 26-yard touchdown run, Aaron Jones kick good	28	7
2	1:58	4	56	1:17	Baylor	Lache Seastrunk 43-yard touchdown run, Aaron Jones kick good	35	7
2	0:07	13	53	1:51	UCLA	30-yard field goal by Kaʻimi Fairbairn	35	10
3	8:18	9	58	2:55	UCLA	40-yard field goal by Kaʻimi Fairbairn	35	13
3	1:52	7	59	2:44	Baylor	Glasco Martin 1-yard touchdown run, Aaron Jones kick good	42	13
4	12:25	5	35	2:17	UCLA	Shaquelle Evans 24-yard touchdown reception from Brett Hundley, 2-point Brett Hundley pass attempt failed	42	19
4	7:46	7	31	3:20	Baylor	Nick Florence 1-yard touchdown run, Aaron Jones kick good	49	19
4	0:00	1	34	0:08	UCLA	Logan Sweet 34-yard touchdown reception from Brett Hundley, Kaʻimi Fairbairn kick good	49	26
"TOP" = time of possession. For other American football terms, see Glossary of American football.								

=== Statistics ===
Statistics	Baylor	UCLA
First downs	25	17
Total offense, plays-yards	80-494	80-362
Rushes-yards (net)	67-306	28-33
Passing yards (net)	188	329
Passes, comp-att-int	10-13-0	26-52-0
Time of possession	35:30	24:30

=== Game notes ===
- December 6, 2012 – Johnathan Franklin was voted second best running back in the nation in the Doak Walker Award, finishing just behind Montee Ball of Wisconsin.
- The Bruins' final touchdown was not reviewed during the game, but replays appeared to show that Logan Sweet was down at the 1-yard line on what was ruled a 34-yard touchdown catch. While the score of the game was 49–26, Baylor Head Coach Art Briles had the score changed to 49–19 on the championship rings presented to Baylor players commemorating the victory. Chip Patterson of CBSSports.com called the changing of the score "an arrogant move."
