= 2016 Cactus Bowl (December) =

2016 Motel 6 Cactus Bowl
- 28th Cactus Bowl
Boise State Broncos	Baylor Bears
(10–2)	(6–6)
Mountain West	Big 12
12	31
Head coach: Bryan Harsin	Head coach: Jim Grobe
	1	2	3	4	Total
Boise State	0	6	0	6	12
Baylor	7	14	3	7	31
- Date: December 27, 2016
- Season: 2016
- Stadium: Chase Field
- Location: Phoenix, Arizona
- MVP: Offensive: Baylor WR K. D. Cannon; Defensive: Baylor DE Tyrone Hunt
- Favorite: Boise State by 8
- Referee: Mike Roche (American)
- Attendance: 33,328
- Payout: US$3,325,000

United States TV coverage
- Network: ESPN/ESPN Radio
- Announcers: TV: Rece Davis, Joey Galloway, David Pollack, Molly McGrath; Radio: Clay Matvick, Dusty Dvoracek, Dawn Davenport

The 2016 Cactus Bowl was a post-season American college football bowl game played on December 27, 2016 at Chase Field in Phoenix, Arizona. This was the 28th edition of the Cactus Bowl, although only the third played under that name. Sponsored by the Motel 6 chain of budget motels, the game is officially known as the Motel 6 Cactus Bowl.

The bowl featured the Baylor Bears of the Big 12 Conference against the Boise State Broncos of the Mountain West Conference, and was the concluding game of the season for both teams.

== Teams ==
The game features tie-ins from the Big 12 Conference and the Mountain West Conference.

=== Baylor Bears ===
Baylor opened the year 6–0 to become bowl eligible. They raised in the polls to as high as #8 in the AP poll and a tie for #6 in the coaches poll. However, the Bears would finish the season on a six-game losing streak to finish in the season 6–6. The team had to also deal all season with the ongoing Baylor University football scandal.

=== Boise State Broncos ===
Boise State opened the season 7–0 and climbed to #13 in the AP and coaches poll before losing to Wyoming and dropping in the polls. The Broncos won their next three games and rose back up to #19 in the polls and were in position to be the highest ranked team from the Group of 5 until a season ending loss to Air Force which dropped them out of the polls, the Mountain West Championship Game, and contention for the Group of 5 spot in a New Years Six bowl. They were selected for the Cactus Bowl after the Pac-12 Conference failed to have enough bowl eligible teams to fill their spot in the game and the Mountain West Conference received a backup spot.

== Game summary ==
	1	2	3	4	Total
Broncos	0	6	0	6	12
Bears	7	14	3	7	31

=== Scoring summary ===
Scoring summary

Quarter	Time	Drive			Team	Scoring information	Score	
Quarter	Time	Plays	Yards	TOP	Team	Scoring information	BSU	BU
1	5:53	6	81	2:21	Baylor	K. D. Cannon 30-yard touchdown reception from Zach Smith, Chris Callahan kick good	0	7
2	13:40	17	57	7:13	Boise St.	24-yard field goal by Tyler Rausa	3	7
2	12:14	5	81	1:20	Baylor	KD Cannon 68-yard touchdown reception from Zach Smith, Chris Callahan kick good	3	14
2	4:19	15	99	4:21	Baylor	JaMycal Hasty 5-yard touchdown run, Chris Callahan kick good	3	21
2	0:11	15	56	4:08	Boise St.	26-yard field goal by Tyler Rausa	6	21
3	3:18	21	78	5:55	Baylor	34-yard field goal by Chris Callahan	6	24
4	10:03	12	71	3:38	Baylor	Ishmael Zamora 14-yard touchdown reception from Zach Smith, Chris Callahan kick good	6	31
4	1:20	5	70	0:53	Boise St.	Cedrick Wilson Jr. 28-yard touchdown reception from Brett Rypien, 2-point pass failed	12	31
"TOP" = time of possession. For other American football terms, see Glossary of American football.							12	31

=== Statistics ===
Statistics	Boise St.	Baylor
First downs	25	29
Plays-yards	89–388	83–515
Third down efficiency	8–19	8–15
Rushes-yards	38–83 (2.2)	43–140 (3.3)
Passing yards	305	375
Passing, Comp-Att-Int	32–51–2	29–40–1
Time of Possession	32:55	27:05

Team	Category	Player	Statistics
Boise St.	Passing	Brett Rypien	32/51, 305 yds, 1 TD, 2 INT
Boise St.	Rushing	Jeremy McNichols	19 car, 46 yds
Boise St.	Receiving	Cedrick Wilson	6 rec, 88 yds, 1 TD
Baylor	Passing	Zach Smith	28/39, 375 yds, 3 TD, 1 INT
Baylor	Rushing	Terence Williams	25 car, 103 yds
Baylor	Receiving	KD Cannon	14 rec, 226 yds, 2 TD
