= 2015 Baylor Bears football team =

American college football season

2015 Baylor Bears football

Russell Athletic Bowl champion

Russell Athletic Bowl, W 49–38 vs. North Carolina
- Conference: Big 12 Conference

Ranking
- Coaches: No. 13
- AP: No. 13
- Record: 10–3 (6–3 Big 12)
- Head coach: Art Briles (8th season)
- Offensive coordinator: Kendal Briles (1st season)
- Offensive scheme: Veer and shoot
- Defensive coordinator: Phil Bennett (5th season)
- Base defense: 4–3
- Home stadium: McLane Stadium

2015 Big 12 Conference football standings
| | Conf. | | | Overall |
| Team | W | | L | W | | L |
|---|---|---|---|---|---|---|
| No. 5 Oklahoma $^ | 8 | – | 1 | 11 | – | 2 |
| No. 20 Oklahoma State | 7 | – | 2 | 10 | – | 3 |
| No. 7 TCU | 7 | – | 2 | 11 | – | 2 |
| No. 13 Baylor | 6 | – | 3 | 10 | – | 3 |
| West Virginia | 4 | – | 5 | 8 | – | 5 |
| Texas Tech | 4 | – | 5 | 7 | – | 6 |
| Texas | 4 | – | 5 | 5 | – | 7 |
| Kansas State | 3 | – | 6 | 6 | – | 7 |
| Iowa State | 2 | – | 7 | 3 | – | 9 |
| Kansas | 0 | – | 9 | 0 | – | 12 |
^ – College Football Playoff participant; $ – Conference champion; Rankings from AP Poll

The 2015 Baylor Bears football team represented Baylor University in the 2015 NCAA Division I FBS football season. The Bears were coached by Art Briles, playing their 117th football season; this year was the team's second season in McLane Stadium in Waco, Texas. The Bears were members of the Big 12 Conference. They finished the season 10–3, 6–3 in Big 12 play to finish in fourth place. They were invited to the Russell Athletic Bowl where they defeated North Carolina 49–38.

The Baylor Bears football team drew an average home attendance of 46,160, just down from 46,710 in 2014, but still more than capacity.

== Recruiting ==
College recruiting
| Name | Hometown | School | Height | Weight | 40^{‡} | Commit date |
|---|---|---|---|---|---|---|
| Blake Lynch; ATH | Gilmer, TX | Gilmer HS | 6 ft 4 in (1.93 m) | 191 lb (87 kg) | 4.50 | Oct 20, 2013 |
| Blake Lynch; ATH | Recruit ratings: Scout: Rivals: 247Sports: ESPN: | | | | | |
| Devontre Stricklin; WR | Waco, TX | Midway HS | 6 ft 2 in (1.88 m) | 167 lb (76 kg) | 4.67 | Jan 24, 2014 |
| Devontre Stricklin; WR | Recruit ratings: Scout: Rivals: 247Sports: ESPN: | | | | | |
| Maurice Porter; OL | Navarro, TX | Navarro College | 6 ft 6 in (1.98 m) | 295 lb (134 kg) | N/A | Feb 28, 2014 |
| Maurice Porter; OL | Recruit ratings: Scout: Rivals: 247Sports: ESPN: | | | | | |
| JaMycal Hasty; RB | Longview, TX | Longview HS | 5 ft 8 in (1.73 m) | 183 lb (83 kg) | 4.50 | Mar 29, 2014 |
| JaMycal Hasty; RB | Recruit ratings: Scout: Rivals: 247Sports: ESPN: | | | | | |
| Sam Tecklenburg; OL | Plano, TX | Plano Senior HS | 6 ft 3 in (1.91 m) | 270 lb (120 kg) | 5.22 | Apr 16, 2014 |
| Sam Tecklenburg; OL | Recruit ratings: Scout: Rivals: 247Sports: ESPN: | | | | | |
| Jordan Tolbert; CB | Missouri City, TX | Ridge Point HS | 5 ft 11 in (1.80 m) | 160 lb (73 kg) | 4.50 | May 9, 2014 |
| Jordan Tolbert; CB | Recruit ratings: Scout: Rivals: 247Sports: ESPN: | | | | | |
| Clay Johnston; LB | Abilene, TX | Wylie HS | 6 ft 2 in (1.88 m) | 199 lb (90 kg) | 4.60 | Jun 3, 2014 |
| Clay Johnston; LB | Recruit ratings: Scout: Rivals: 247Sports: ESPN: | | | | | |
| Jameson Houston; S | Austin, TX | St. Michael's Academy | 6 ft 2 in (1.88 m) | 190 lb (86 kg) | 4.40 | Jul 30, 2014 |
| Jameson Houston; S | Recruit ratings: Scout: Rivals: 247Sports: ESPN: | | | | | |
| Andrew Galitz; K | Rowlett, TX | Rowlett HS | 5 ft 11 in (1.80 m) | 180 lb (82 kg) | N/A | Aug 26, 2014 |
| Andrew Galitz; K | Recruit ratings: Scout: Rivals: 247Sports: ESPN: | | | | | |
| Tony Nicholson; WR | Grand Prairie, TX | South Grand Prairie HS | 5 ft 9 in (1.75 m) | 171 lb (78 kg) | 4.45 | Sep 21, 2014 |
| Tony Nicholson; WR | Recruit ratings: Scout: Rivals: 247Sports: ESPN: | | | | | |
| J.W. Ketchum; ATH | Houston, TX | Lamar HS | 6 ft 1 in (1.85 m) | 190 lb (86 kg) | 4.63 | Oct 26, 2014 |
| J.W. Ketchum; ATH | Recruit ratings: Scout: Rivals: 247Sports: ESPN: | | | | | |
| Domonic Desouza; OL | San Francisco, CA | City College of San Francisco | 6 ft 7 in (2.01 m) | 300 lb (140 kg) | N/A | Nov 17, 2014 |
| Domonic Desouza; OL | Recruit ratings: Scout: Rivals: 247Sports: ESPN: | | | | | |
| Jarrett Stidham; QB | Stephenville, TX | Stephenville HS | 6 ft 3 in (1.91 m) | 185 lb (84 kg) | 4.74 | Dec 19, 2014 |
| Jarrett Stidham; QB | Recruit ratings: Scout: Rivals: 247Sports: ESPN: | | | | | |
| Lenoy Jones Jr. OLB | Waco, TX | Midway HS | 6 ft 0 in (1.83 m) | 214 lb (97 kg) | 4.75 | Jan 15, 2015 |
| Lenoy Jones Jr. OLB | Recruit ratings: Scout: Rivals: 247Sports: ESPN: | | | | | |
| Eric Ogor; OLB | Richmond, TX | Foster HS | 6 ft 0 in (1.83 m) | 205 lb (93 kg) | 4.48 | Jan 16, 2015 |
| Eric Ogor; OLB | Recruit ratings: Scout: Rivals: 247Sports: ESPN: | | | | | |
| Jordan Williams; OLB | Paris, TX | Paris HS | 6 ft 1 in (1.85 m) | 220 lb (100 kg) | N/A | Jan 16, 2015 |
| Jordan Williams; OLB | Recruit ratings: Scout: Rivals: 247Sports: ESPN: | | | | | |
| Riley Daniel; OT | Ringling, OK | Ringling HS | 6 ft 5 in (1.96 m) | 290 lb (130 kg) | 5.23 | Jan 25, 2015 |
| Riley Daniel; OT | Recruit ratings: Scout: Rivals: 247Sports: ESPN: | | | | | |
| Tyrone Hunt; DE | Arp, TX | Arp HS | 6 ft 4 in (1.93 m) | 230 lb (100 kg) | N/A | Jan 27, 2015 |
| Tyrone Hunt; DE | Recruit ratings: Scout: Rivals: 247Sports: ESPN: | | | | | |
| Henry Black; CB | Shreveport, LA | Woodlawn HS | 6 ft 0 in (1.83 m) | 176 lb (80 kg) | 4.51 | Jan 31, 2015 |
| Henry Black; CB | Recruit ratings: Scout: Rivals: 247Sports: ESPN: | | | | | |
Overall recruit ranking: Scout: 44 Rivals: 43 247Sports: 37 ESPN: 31
‡ Refers to 40-yard dash; Note: In many cases, Scout, Rivals, 247Sports, On3, and ESPN may conflict in their listings of height, weight and 40 time.; In these cases, the average was taken. ESPN grades are on a 100-point scale.; Sources: "2015 Team Ranking". Rivals.com.

== Schedule ==
| Date | Time | Opponent | Rank | Site | TV | Result | Attendance |
|---|---|---|---|---|---|---|---|
| September 4 | 6:00 p.m. | at SMU* | No. 4 | Gerald J. Ford Stadium; University Park, TX | ESPN | W 56–21 | 32,047 |
| September 12 | 6:30 p.m. | Lamar* | No. 4 | McLane Stadium; Waco, TX | FSN | W 66–31 | 44,491 |
| September 26 | 2:00 p.m. | Rice* | No. 5 | McLane Stadium; Waco, TX | FSN | W 70–17 | 43,619 |
| October 3 | 2:30 p.m. | vs. Texas Tech | No. 5 | AT&T Stadium; Arlington, TX (Texas Shootout) | ABC/ESPN2 | W 63–35 | 56,179 |
| October 10 | 11:00 a.m. | at Kansas | No. 3 | Memorial Stadium; Lawrence, KS | FS1 | W 66–7 | 25,910 |
| October 17 | 11:00 a.m. | West Virginia | No. 2 | McLane Stadium; Waco, TX | FOX | W 62–38 | 45,370 |
| October 24 | 11:00 a.m. | Iowa State^{†} | No. 2 | McLane Stadium; Waco, TX | ESPN | W 45–27 | 45,512 |
| November 5 | 6:30 p.m. | at Kansas State | No. 4 | Bill Snyder Family Football Stadium; Manhattan, KS | FS1 | W 31–24 | 52,108 |
| November 14 | 7:00 p.m. | No. 12 Oklahoma | No. 4 | McLane Stadium; Waco, TX (College GameDay) | ABC | L 34–44 | 49,875 |
| November 21 | 6:30 p.m. | at No. 6 Oklahoma State | No. 10 | Boone Pickens Stadium; Stillwater, OK | FOX | W 45–35 | 58,669 |
| November 27 | 6:30 p.m. | at No. 19 TCU | No. 7 | Amon G. Carter Stadium; Fort Worth, TX (rivalry) | ESPN | L 21–28 ^{2OT} | 47,675 |
| December 5 | 11:00 a.m. | Texas | No. 12 | McLane Stadium; Waco, TX (rivalry) | ESPN | L 17–23 | 48,093 |
| December 29 | 4:30 p.m. | vs. No. 10 North Carolina* | No. 17 | Orlando Citrus Bowl Stadium; Orlando, FL (Russell Athletic Bowl) | ESPN | W 49–38 | 40,418 |
*Non-conference game; ^{†}Homecoming; Rankings from AP Poll and CFP Rankings after November 3 released prior to game; All times are in Central time

Schedule source:

== Rankings ==
Ranking movements Legend: ██ Increase in ranking ██ Decrease in ranking ( ) = First-place votes
| | Week | | | | | | | | | | | | | | | |
| Poll | Pre | 1 | 2 | 3 | 4 | 5 | 6 | 7 | 8 | 9 | 10 | 11 | 12 | 13 | 14 | Final |
|---|---|---|---|---|---|---|---|---|---|---|---|---|---|---|---|---|
| AP | 4 | 4 | 5 | 5 | 5 | 3 (10) | 2 (13) | 2 (12) | 2 (7) | 2 (6) | 4 (2) | 10 | 7 | 12 | 17 | 13 |
| Coaches | 4 | 4 | 5 | 4 | 4 | 4 (5) | 2 (8) | 2 (12) | 2 (10) | 2 (9) | 3 (5) | 10 | 7 | 12 | 19 | 13 |
| CFP | Not released | | | | | | | | | 6 | 6 | 10 | 7 | 12 | 17 | Not released |

== Roster ==
2015 Baylor Bears football team roster
Players
Coaches
Offense

| Pos. | # | Name | Class |
|---|---|---|---|
| WR | 1 | Corey Coleman | Jr |
| WR | 2 | Blake Lynch | Fr |
| QB | 3 | Jarrett Stidham | Fr |
| WR | 4 | Jay Lee | Sr |
| RB | 5 | Johnny Jefferson | So |
| RB | 6 | JaMycal Hasty | Fr |
| WR | 7 | Lynx Hawthorne | Jr |
| WR | 8 | Ishmael Zamora | Fr |
| WR | 9 | K. D. Cannon | So |
| WR | 11 | Pooh Stricklin | Fr |
| WR | 12 | Quan Jones | So |
| QB | 13 | Chris Johnson | So |
| WR | 14 | Chris Platt | Fr |
| TE | 15 | Gus Penning | Sr |
| WR | 16 | Davion Hall | So |
| QB | 17 | Seth Russell | Jr |
| QB | 18 | Zack Bennema | Fr |
| RB | 20 | Anthony Webb | Sr |
| RB | 22 | Terence Williams | Fr |
| RB | 25 | Dwyer Bucey | Fr |
| RB | 28 | Devin Chafin | Jr |
| WR | 30 | Tanner Ritchey | Fr |
| RB | 32 | Shock Linwood | Jr |
| RB | 33 | Iain Hunter | Fr |
| TE | 41 | Tre'von Armstead | Jr |
| OL | 52 | Rami Hammad | So |
| OL | 53 | Keith Orcutt | So |
| OL | 55 | Kyle Fuller | Jr |
| OL | 57 | Tanner Thrift | So |
| OL | 58 | Spencer Drango | Sr |
| OL | 61 | Jarell Broxton | Sr |
| OL | 64 | Dom Desouza | Jr |
| OL | 67 | Desmine Hilliard | Sr |
| OL | 68 | Ishmael Wilson | So |
| OL | 69 | Pat Colbert | Sr |
| OL | 70 | Josh Peltzel | Fr |
| OL | 71 | Devonte Jones | Fr |
| OL | 72 | Blake Blackmar | Fr |
| OL | 73 | Blake Muir | Sr |
| OL | 74 | Sean Muir | So |
| OL | 76 | Jason Osei | Jr |
| OL | 77 | Patrick Lawrence | Fr |
| TE | 80 | LaQuan McGowan | Sr |
| WR | 80 | Cal Spangler | Sr |
| WR | 82 | Kaleb Moore | Jr |
| WR | 83 | Cole Edminston | So |
| TE | 85 | Jordan Feuerbacher | Fr |
| WR | 87 | Andy Ritter | Jr |
| WR | 89 | Trevor White | Fr |
| TE | 98 | Trevor Clemons-Valdez | Sr |

Defense

| Pos. | # | Name | Class |
|---|---|---|---|
| LB | 1 | Taylor Young | So |
| DE | 2 | Shawn Oakman | Sr |
| CB | 3 | Tion Wright | Jr |
| DB | 4 | Xavien Howard | Jr |
| LB | 5 | Grant Campbell | Sr |
| CB | 7 | Jourdan Blake | Fr |
| CB | 9 | Ryan Reid | Jr |
| CB | 11 | Jameson Houston | Fr |
| S | 12 | Alfred Pollum | So |
| S | 13 | Terrell Burt | Sr |
| DE | 15 | Brian Nance | So |
| LB | 16 | Kendall Ehrlich | Jr |
| NB | 17 | Cordell Dorsey | Fr |
| S | 18 | Chance Waz | Fr |
| LB | 19 | Raaquan Davis | So |
| LB | 20 | Aiavion Edwards | Jr |
| NB | 21 | Patrick Levels | Jr |
| CB | 24 | Terrence Singleton | Jr |
| CB | 25 | Miles Johnson | Sr |
| S | 26 | Taion Sells | Jr |
| CB | 27 | Verkedric Vaughns | Fr |
| S | 28 | Orion Stewart | Jr |
| S | 29 | Jarrod Koym | Fr |
| NB | 34 | Lee Bristow | Sr |
| S | 35 | Mallory Franklin | Fr |
| CB | 37 | Tyler Jaynes | So |
| S | 41 | Calvin Hill | Fr |
| DE | 43 | Jamie Jacobs | Fr |
| LB | 45 | Xavier Phillips | So |
| NB | 48 | Travon Blanchard | So |
| DE | 52 | Greg Roberts | Fr |
| LB | 55 | Baylor Black | Jr |
| DE | 56 | K.J. Smith | So |
| DT | 75 | Andrew Billings | Jr |
| DE | 90 | Javonte Magee | Jr |
| DT | 91 | Andrew Morris | Fr |
| DE | 92 | Jamal Palmer | Sr |
| DT | 93 | Suleiman Masumbuko | Sr |
| DE | 94 | Xavier Jones | Fr |
| DT | 95 | Beau Blackshear | Sr |
| DT | 96 | Byron Bonds | Jr |
| DT | 97 | Ira Lewis | Fr |
| DL | 98 | Cody George | Fr |
| DE | 99 | Josh Malin | Fr |

Special teams

| Pos. | # | Name | Class |
|---|---|---|---|
| PK | 33 | Tom Bennett | Fr |
| P | 36 | Drew Galitz | Fr |
| K | 39 | Spencer Evans | Fr |
| PK | 40 | Chris Callahan | So |
| LS | 50 | Jimmy Landes | Sr |
| LS | 65 | B.J. Jordan | Sr |

Head coach

- Art Briles (8th season)

Coordinators/assistant coaches

- Kendal Briles – Offensive coordinator
- Phil Bennett – Defensive coordinator
- Randy Clements – Offensive line
- Brian Norwood – Associate head coach / Safeties
- Chris Achuff – Defensive line
- Carlton Buckels – Cornerbacks
- Joe Jon Finley – Offensive quality control analyst
- Jim Gush – Linebackers / Defensive Recruiting Coordinator
- Jeff Lebby – Running backs
- Colin Shillinglaw – Assistant A.D. / Football Operations
- Beau Trahan – Director of football operations
- Jeff Barlow – Director of Equipment Services
- Brett Bufton – Assistant Director of Equipment Services
- Casey Horny – Assistant Director of Operations
- Odell James – Assistant Director of Operations
- Kaz Kazadi – Assistant A.D. / Athletic Performance
- Calvin Lowry – Assistant Director of Operations
- Mike Sims – Assistant A.D. / Athletic Training
- Austin Steele – Assistant Director of Operations
- Tate Wallis – Assistant Director of Operations

Legend

- (C) Team captain
- (S) Suspended
- (I) Ineligible
- Injured
- Redshirt

Roster
Last update: August 30, 2015

== Game summaries ==
=== @ SMU ===
| | 1 | 2 | 3 | 4 | Total |
|---|---|---|---|---|---|
| #4 Bears | 28 | 0 | 14 | 14 | 56 |
| Mustangs | 14 | 7 | 0 | 0 | 21 |

=== Lamar ===
| | 1 | 2 | 3 | 4 | Total |
|---|---|---|---|---|---|
| Cardinals | 7 | 14 | 3 | 7 | 31 |
| #4 Bears | 13 | 22 | 14 | 17 | 66 |

=== Rice ===
| | 1 | 2 | 3 | 4 | Total |
|---|---|---|---|---|---|
| Owls | 10 | 0 | 7 | 0 | 17 |
| #5 Bears | 21 | 21 | 21 | 7 | 70 |

=== Vs. Texas Tech ===
| | 1 | 2 | 3 | 4 | Total |
|---|---|---|---|---|---|
| Red Raiders | 14 | 7 | 7 | 7 | 35 |
| #5 Bears | 28 | 21 | 7 | 7 | 63 |

=== @ Kansas ===
| | 1 | 2 | 3 | 4 | Total |
|---|---|---|---|---|---|
| #3 Bears | 24 | 28 | 14 | 0 | 66 |
| Jayhawks | 7 | 0 | 0 | 0 | 7 |

=== West Virginia ===
| | 1 | 2 | 3 | 4 | Total |
|---|---|---|---|---|---|
| Mountaineers | 7 | 10 | 7 | 14 | 38 |
| #2 Bears | 17 | 10 | 21 | 14 | 62 |

=== Iowa State ===
| | 1 | 2 | 3 | 4 | Total |
|---|---|---|---|---|---|
| Cyclones | 0 | 7 | 7 | 13 | 27 |
| #2 Bears | 21 | 14 | 0 | 10 | 45 |

=== @ Kansas State ===
| | 1 | 2 | 3 | 4 | Total |
|---|---|---|---|---|---|
| Bears | 14 | 7 | 7 | 3 | 31 |
| Wildcats | 7 | 0 | 3 | 14 | 24 |

=== Oklahoma ===
| | 1 | 2 | 3 | 4 | Total |
|---|---|---|---|---|---|
| Sooners | 7 | 13 | 14 | 10 | 44 |
| Bears | 6 | 7 | 14 | 7 | 34 |

=== @ Oklahoma State ===
| | 1 | 2 | 3 | 4 | Total |
|---|---|---|---|---|---|
| Bears | 14 | 10 | 14 | 7 | 45 |
| Cowboys | 14 | 0 | 7 | 14 | 35 |

=== @ TCU ===
| | 1 | 2 | 3 | 4 | OT | 2OT | Total |
|---|---|---|---|---|---|---|---|
| Bears | 14 | 0 | 0 | 0 | 7 | 0 | 21 |
| Horned Frogs | 7 | 7 | 0 | 0 | 7 | 7 | 28 |

=== Texas ===
| | 1 | 2 | 3 | 4 | Total |
|---|---|---|---|---|---|
| Longhorns | 17 | 3 | 0 | 3 | 23 |
| Bears | 0 | 0 | 10 | 7 | 17 |

=== Vs. North Carolina ===
| | 1 | 2 | 3 | 4 | Total |
|---|---|---|---|---|---|
| #10 Tar Heels | 7 | 10 | 14 | 7 | 38 |
| #17 Bears | 14 | 14 | 14 | 7 | 49 |
