= Shock Linwood =

American football player (born 1993)

No. 32
- Position: Running back

Personal information
- Born: October 13, 1993 (age 33); Linden, Texas, U.S.
- Listed height: 5 ft 9 in (1.75 m)
- Listed weight: 213 lb (97 kg)

Career information
- College: Baylor University (2012–2016)

Awards and highlights
- First-team All-Big 12 (2014); Second-team All-Big 12 (2015); 2× Big 12 champion (2013, 2014)
- Stats at ESPN

Rashoderick "Shock" Linwood (born October 13, 1993) is an American former college football running back. He played for the Baylor Bears football team at Baylor University.

== Early life ==
Linwood attended Linden-Kildare High School in Linden, Texas, where he was an All-State running back, while also playing quarterback, linebacker, defensive back and kick returner. As a junior in 2010, he led Kildare to a 10-3 record and the regional semifinals, ran for 1,473 yards and 18 touchdowns (156 attempts) and made 14 receptions for 138 yards and two more scores. Linwood was named 2010 All-District 8-2A. He was named the 2011 first-team Class 2A All-State running back and was an honorable mention All-State quarterback as a senior after rushing for 2,105 yards and 25 touchdowns (241 attempts), ranking fifth in the state in rushing yardage, and also threw for 729 yards and five touchdowns. Linwood was also selected the 2011 District 8-2A Player of Year and was named to the 2011 East Texas All-Area first team as running back. Also a letterman in track & field, Linwood competed as a sprinter and had a personal-best of 10.98 seconds in the 100-meter dash.

Linwood was ranked by 247Sports.com as the 33rd best athlete recruit and No. 74 overall prospect in Texas. He was listed as the nation's No. 80 safety prospect by Scout.com. Linwood was also ranked No. 89 by Rivals.com's Lone Star Recruiting and No. 101 by SuperPrep's Texas 121.

== College career ==
=== Redshirt freshman ===
Linwood did not play in any games as a true freshman in 2012. As a redshirt freshman in 2013 he appeared in twelve of thirteen games as a backup to Lache Seastrunk. He started in two games in place of injured Seastrunk and Glasco Martin. Linwood rushed for a freshman school record 881 yards, breaking Robert Griffin III's mark of 843 in 2008. Linwood's 881 yards and 8 touchdowns earned him Freshman All-American honors. He majored in Health Science.

=== Sophomore ===
As a sophomore in 2014, Linwood rushed for 1,252 yards and 16 touchdowns as the first string running back. He also led Baylor to their second consecutive Big 12 title.

=== Junior ===
Linwood was considered a possible contender for the Heisman Trophy during the 2015 season.

=== Senior ===
In 2016, Linwood played during the regular season (with the exception of the November 12 game against Oklahoma) with the Bears recording a season record of 6:6. He sat out the post-season Cactus Bowl to focus on possible NFL career.

=== College statistics ===
Statistics for Linwood's college football appearances:

		Rushing					Receiving		
Year	Team	Att	Yds	Avg	Lng	TD	Rec	Yds	TD
2016	Baylor	138	751	5.4	59	2	2	6	0
2015	Baylor	196	1,329	6.8	79	10	9	71	1
2014	Baylor	128	881	6.9	68	8	4	19	0
2013	Baylor	251	1,252	5.0	46	16	7	90	0
Career		713	4,213	5.9	79	36	22	186	1
