= 2011 Alamo Bowl =

2011 Valero Alamo Bowl
| Washington Huskies | Baylor Bears |
| (7–5) | (9–3) |
| Pac-12 | Big 12 |
| 56 | 67 |
| Head coach: Steve Sarkisian | Head coach: Art Briles |
| | AP / Coaches / BCS; 15 / 16 / 12 |
| | 1 | 2 | 3 | 4 | Total |
|---|---|---|---|---|---|
| Washington | 7 | 28 | 14 | 7 | 56 |
| Baylor | 21 | 3 | 29 | 14 | 67 |
- Date: December 29, 2011
- Season: 2011
- Stadium: Alamodome
- Location: San Antonio, Texas
- MVP: Terrance Ganaway (RB)
- Favorite: Baylor by 9
- Referee: Ron Cherry (ACC)
- Attendance: 65,256
- Payout: US$2.25 million per team

United States TV coverage
- Network: ESPN
- Announcers: Dave Pasch (Play-by-Play); Chris Spielman (Analyst); Quint Kessenich (Sidelines)
- Nielsen ratings: 4.41

The 2011 Valero Alamo Bowl, the 19th edition of the game, was a post-season American college football bowl game, held on December 29, 2011 at the Alamodome in San Antonio, Texas as part of the 2011–12 NCAA Bowl season.

The game, which was telecast at 8:00 p.m. CT on ESPN, featured the Washington Huskies from the Pac-12 Conference versus the Baylor Bears, led by Heisman Trophy winner Robert Griffin III, from the Big 12 Conference. With a total combined score of 123 points, the game is currently the highest-scoring regulation bowl game in college football history.

== Teams ==
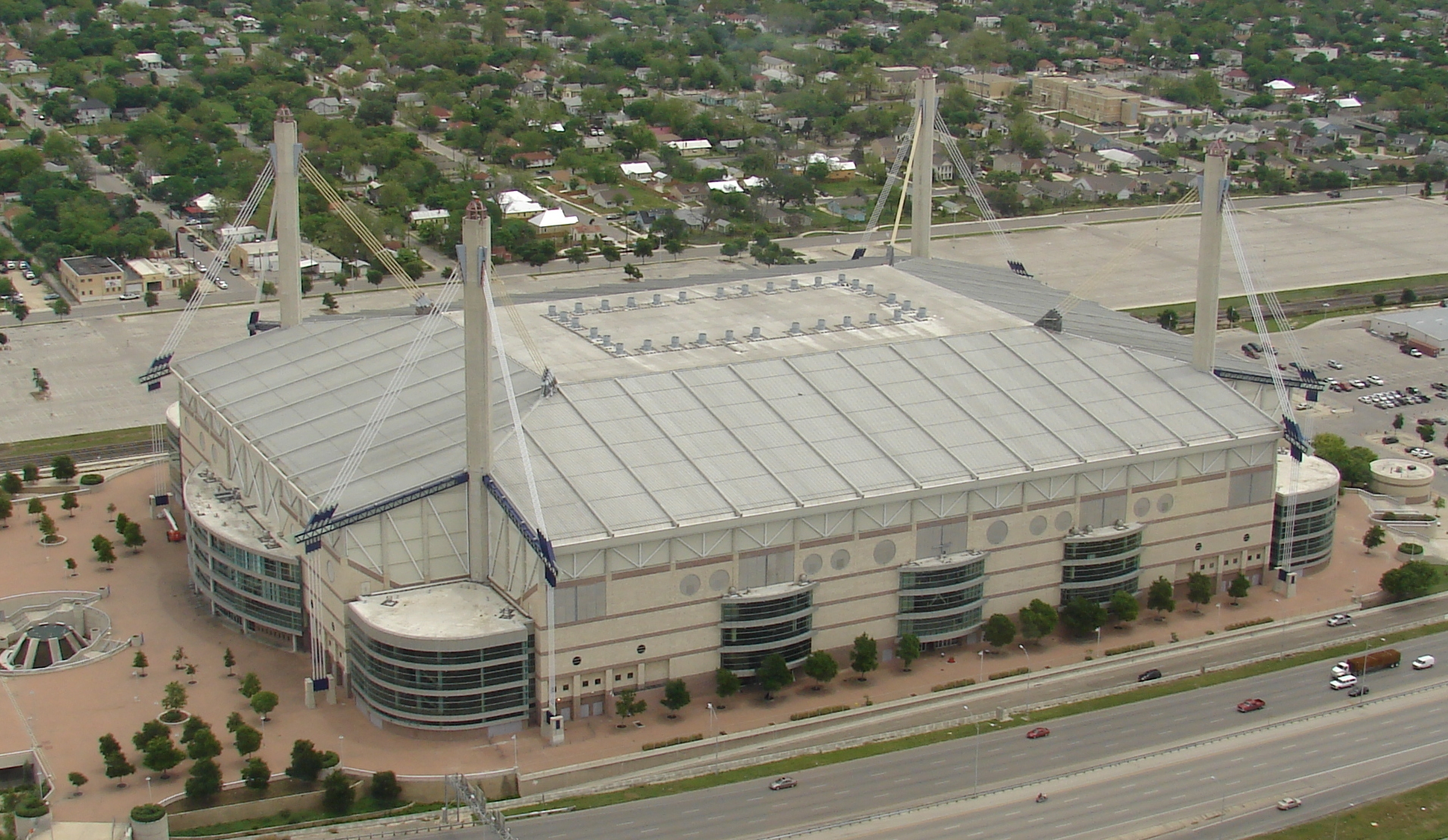
The 2011 Alamo Bowl was played at the Alamodome.

On December 4, 2011, both Washington and Baylor accepted invitations to play in the 2011 Alamo Bowl. The two teams had not met since 1965, with the Bears holding a 3–1 advantage against the Huskies. Baylor and UW played home-and-home series in 1954–55 and 1964–65. The Bears won in Waco in 1954 (34–7) and in Seattle in 1955 (13–7). Washington won in Seattle in 1964 (35–14), and Baylor won in Waco in 1965 (17–14).

=== Washington ===
Washington entered the game with a record of 7–5, finishing 3rd in the Pac-12 North division. Washington quarterback Keith Price had a single-season school record 29 touchdown passes in the 2011 regular season. Running back Chris Polk was ranked 16th in the nation in rushing, averaging 112 yards per game. In addition, the Huskies were very efficient in the red zone, scoring 36 touchdowns on 45 trips. Washington's defense, on the other hand, was ranked only 116th out of 120 against the pass and only 102nd against the run.

=== Baylor ===
Baylor entered the game 9–3, finishing 3rd in the Big 12 standings. The Bears were looking for their first bowl win since the 1992 John Hancock Bowl, notably the last game for legendary Baylor coach Grant Teaff. Baylor entered the game on a 5-game winning streak, after starting 4–3. During the 5-game winning streak, Baylor averaged 46.4 points and 587 yards, which included the Bears' first ever victory over Oklahoma. For the season, the Bears had the nation's 2nd ranked total offense (571.25 yards per game), 5th ranked passing offense (356.2 yards per game) and 18th ranked rushing offense (215.08 yards per game). Baylor's offense was led by Heisman Trophy-winning QB Robert Griffin III. Wide receiver Kendall Wright and running back Terrance Ganaway were other players that led the offense. Baylor's defense, on the other hand, was ranked only 114th overall in the FBS.

== Game summary ==
Baylor scored first on an 11-yard touchdown pass to Kendall Wright. Washington responded with a 5-yard Keith Price touchdown run to tie the game 7-7. The Bears were able to score two more rushing touchdowns from Jarred Salubi and Robert Griffin III to go up 21–7 at the end of the 1st quarter.

In the 2nd quarter, Washington cut the deficit 21–14 on a 12-yard touchdown pass to James Johnson. After forcing Baylor to punt, the Huskies tied the game 21–21 on a 1-yard touchdown pass to Devin Aguilar. On the ensuing drive, Baylor's Robert Griffin III fumbled the ball at Washington's 43-yard line. Taking advantage of the fumble, Washington took the lead 28–21 on a 15-yard touchdown run from Keith Price. After Baylor turned the ball over on downs, Washington took a 35–21 lead with only 1 play on a 56-yard touchdown run from Chris Polk. Baylor was able to cut the deficit 35–24 at the end of the half on a 42-yard field goal.

Washington received the ball in the 3rd quarter. The Huskies quickly took a 42–24 lead on an 80-yard touchdown pass to Jermaine Kearse. Baylor responded with a Jarred Salubi touchdown run to make it 42–31. Baylor's defense was then able to force Washington to punt. However, Washington's defense responded by forcing a three and out. On the ensuing punt, Washington's Kasen Williams returned the punt 46 yard to Baylor's 17-yard line. However, on the next play, Washington's Chris Polk fumbled the ball, giving Baylor the ball back at the Baylor's 11-yard line. Baylor quickly cut the deficit 42–39 on an 89-yard Terrance Ganaway touchdown run (Baylor went for a two-point conversion and succeeded). Washington answered with a 13-yard Devin Aguilar touchdown reception to make it 49–39. On the next drive, Baylor once again made it a 3-point game on a 1-yard touchdown run by Terrance Ganaway. After Washington's Eric Folk missed a 43-yard field goal, Baylor took a 53–49 lead on another touchdown run from Terrance Ganaway.

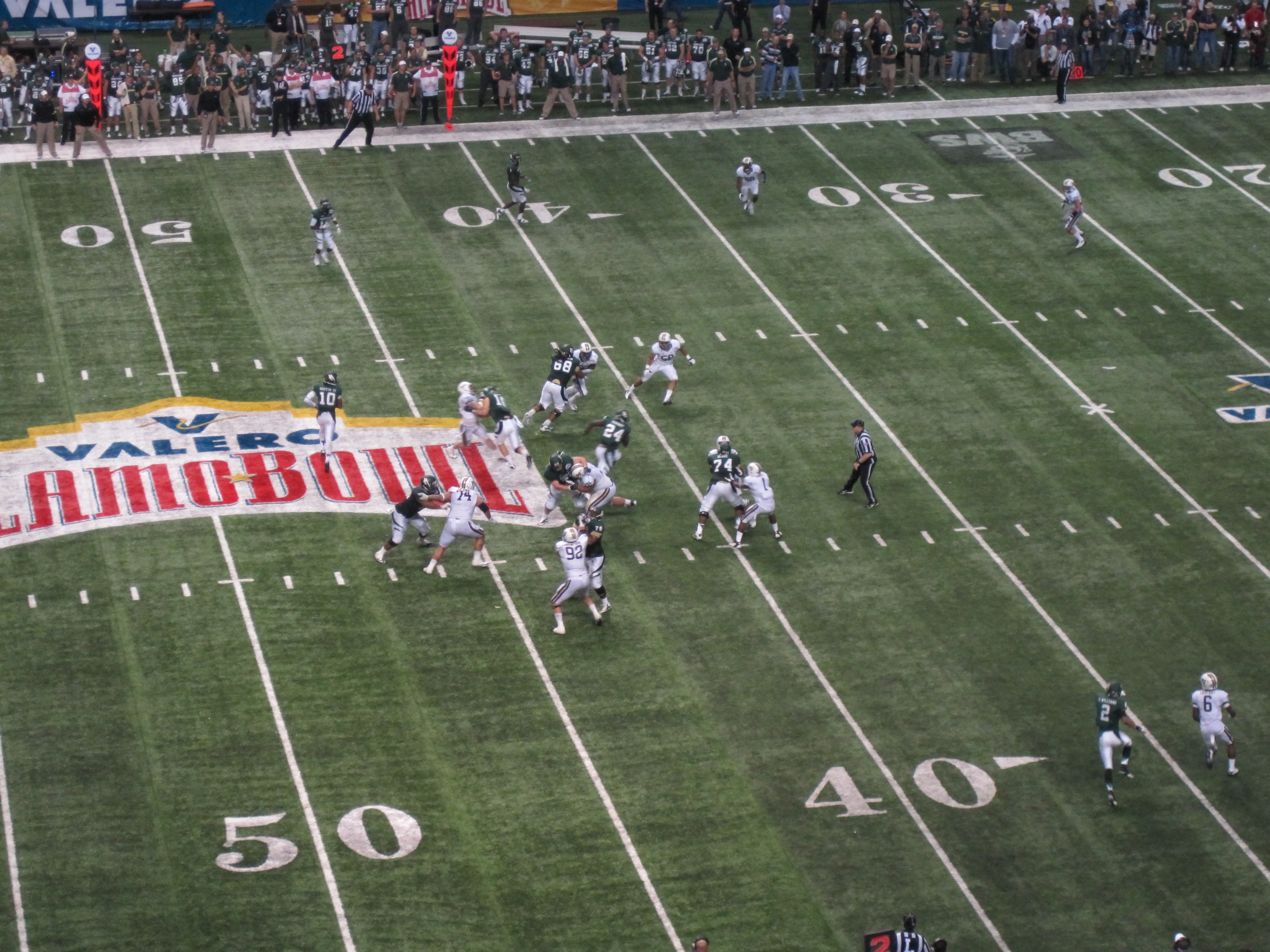
Baylor's Terrance Ganaway (#24) rushes for a 43-yard touchdown, his 5th of the 2011 Alamo Bowl, with 2:34 remaining in the 4th quarter.

Washington retook the lead 56–53 in the 4th quarter on a 13-play, 76-yard drive that took 6 minutes, 18 seconds that was capped off by an 8-yard touchdown run from Keith Price. Baylor, however, retook the lead again 60–56 on a 4-yard touchdown run from Terrance Ganaway. Baylor's defense was able to force Washington to turn the ball over on downs with 3:20 left in regulation. The Bears then scored again on a 43-yard touchdown run from Ganaway to go up 67–56. After Washington fumbled the ensuing kickoff, Baylor was able to run out the clock to preserve the victory.

=== Records ===
Several records were set in the 2011 Alamo Bowl. The 123 combined points were the most scored in regulation in a bowl game. The game also had 1,397 combined yards of offense and 17 touchdowns, both bowl game records. Baylor's 67 points were the most scored in bowl history. However, the record stood for just six days, when the West Virginia Mountaineers defeated the Clemson Tigers 70–33 in the 2012 Orange Bowl.

The Bears set an all-time bowl game record with 777 yards of total offense and was also the most yards ever allowed by Washington. Because of the Huskies' defensive performance, defensive coordinator Nick Holt was fired, as were defensive assistants Mike Cox (linebackers), and Jeff Mills (safeties) on December 31.

With the win, Baylor secured their first 10-win season since 1980. Baylor also won its first bowl game since 1992.

== Scoring summary ==
Source.

| Scoring Play | Score |
|---|---|
1st Quarter
| BU – Kendall Wright 11 Yd Pass From Robert Griffin III (Aaron Jones Kick), 11:14 | BU 7–0 |
| UW – Keith Price 5 Yd Run (Erik Folk Kick), 7:26 | Tie 7–7 |
| BU – Jarred Salubi 36 Yd Run (Aaron Jones Kick), 6:03 | BU 14–7 |
| BU – Robert Griffin III 24 Yd Run (Aaron Jones Kick), 0:48 | BU 21–7 |
2nd Quarter
| UW – James Johnson 12 Yd Pass From Keith Price (Erik Folk Kick), 11:32 | BU 21–14 |
| UW – Devin Aguilar 1 Yd Pass From Keith Price (Erik Folk Kick), 4:52 | Tie 21–21 |
| UW – Keith Price 15 Yd Run (Erik Folk Kick), 1:38 | UW 28–21 |
| UW – Chris Polk 56 Yd Run (Erik Folk Kick), 0:31 | UW 35–21 |
| BU – Aaron Jones 42 Yd Field Goal, 0:00 | UW 35–24 |
3rd Quarter
| UW – Jermaine Kearse 80 Yd Pass from Keith Price (Erik Folk Kick), 14:00 | UW 42–24 |
| BU – Jarred Salubi 7 Yd Run (Aaron Jones Kick), 11:06 | UW 42–31 |
| BU – Terrance Ganaway 89 Yd Run (Robert Griffin III Pass to Jerod Monk for Two-Point Conversion), 8:28 | UW 42–39 |
| UW – Devin Aguilar 13 Yd Pass From Keith Price (Erik Folk Kick), 7:44 | UW 49–39 |
| BU – Terrance Ganaway 1 Yd Run (Aaron Jones Kick), 6:01 | UW 49–46 |
| BU – Terrance Ganaway 1 Yd Run (Aaron Jones Kick), 0:58 | BU 53–49 |
4th Quarter
| UW – Keith Price 8 Yd Run (Erik Folk Kick), 9:40 | UW 56–53 |
| BU – Terrance Ganaway 4 Yd Run (Aaron Jones Kick), 8:15 | BU 60–56 |
| BU – Terrance Ganaway 43 Yd Run (Aaron Jones Kick), 2:28 | BU 67–56 |

=== Statistics ===
| Statistics | Washington | Baylor |
|---|---|---|
| First downs | 26 | 33 |
| Rushes-yards (net) | 37-182 | 52–482 |
| Passing yards (net) | 438 | 295 |
| Passes, Att-Comp-Int | 37-23-0 | 33–24–0 |
| Total yards | 620 | 777 |
| Time of Possession | 31:50 | 28:10 |

== See also ==
- 2001 GMAC Bowl, the previous record-holder for most regulation points and still the record-holder for overall points as it required two overtime periods to decide.
