= Seth Russell =

American football player (born 1994)

No. 17
- Position: Quarterback

Personal information
- Born: January 27, 1994 (age 32); Dallas, Texas, U.S.
- Listed height: 6 ft 3 in (1.91 m)
- Listed weight: 213 lb (97 kg)

Career information
- High school: Garland (TX)
- College: Baylor
- NFL draft: 2017: undrafted
- Stats at Pro Football Reference

Seth Andrew Russell (born January 27, 1994) is an American former football quarterback. He played college football for the Baylor Bears.

== Early life ==
Russell attended Garland High School in Garland, Texas. As a senior, he completed 103 of 188 passes (54.7%) for 1,502 yards and 12 passing touchdowns, while also rushing for 471 yards on 83 attempts with 7 rushing touchdowns. Russell originally verbally committed to play football for the University of Kansas but later chose Baylor University.

== College career ==
Russell redshirted as a freshman in 2012 and did not receive any playing time.

He spent his freshman season in 2013 as the backup to Bryce Petty. As Petty's back-up he appeared in 7 games, completing 26 of 43 passes (60.4%) for 427 yards with 3 touchdowns and 3 interceptions. He also rushed for 147 yards with 3 touchdowns.

In 2014, Russell was again the backup to Petty. However, due to injury, Russell made his first career start against Northwestern State, replacing Petty who missed the game due to injury. During the game, he completed 16 of 25 passes for 438 yards and five touchdowns. Overall, he completed 48 of 85 for 804 yards with eight touchdowns and one interception, 185 rushing yards and three rushing touchdowns.

With Petty graduating, Russell competed to be Baylor's starter for 2015, and was seen as the favorite for the role over incoming freshman Jarrett Stidham and sophomore Chris Johnson. On September 26, Russell threw for 277 yards and six touchdowns in less than three quarters during a 70–17 win over Rice. Russell broke a bone in his neck in a win against Iowa State and required season ending surgery.

On November 12, 2016, Russell suffered a fractured left ankle against Oklahoma. The day after the game, Baylor revealed that the injury would cause Russell to miss the rest of the season.

=== College statistics ===
Season	Team	Passing							Rushing			
Season	Team	Cmp	Att	Pct	Yds	TD	Int	Rtg	Att	Yds	Avg	TD
2012	Baylor	Redshirted										
2013	Baylor	26	43	60.5	427	3	3	152.9	24	147	6.1	3
2014	Baylor	48	85	56.5	804	8	1	164.6	32	185	5.8	3
2015	Baylor	119	200	59.5	2,104	29	6	189.7	49	402	8.2	6
2016	Baylor	152	278	54.7	2,126	20	8	136.9	94	506	5.4	8
Total		345	606	56.9	5,461	60	18	159.4	199	1,240	6.2	20

== Professional career ==
While still recovering from his ankle injury, Russell attended the NFL Scouting Combine and was able to throw and partake in the interview process. After the combine, he threw 60 passes during Baylor's Pro Day and worked out for the Dallas Cowboys. According to a league source, he received final medical clearance by doctors in mid-April. Later that month, Russell went undrafted in the 2017 NFL draft. After the draft, he attended rookie minicamp with the Oakland Raiders and New Orleans Saints. He also had tryouts with the Indianapolis Colts, Cincinnati Bengals, and Dallas Cowboys. On September 18, 2017, Russell announced that he was medically retiring from football due to issues with his ankle.
