= Kendall Wright =

American football player (born 1989)

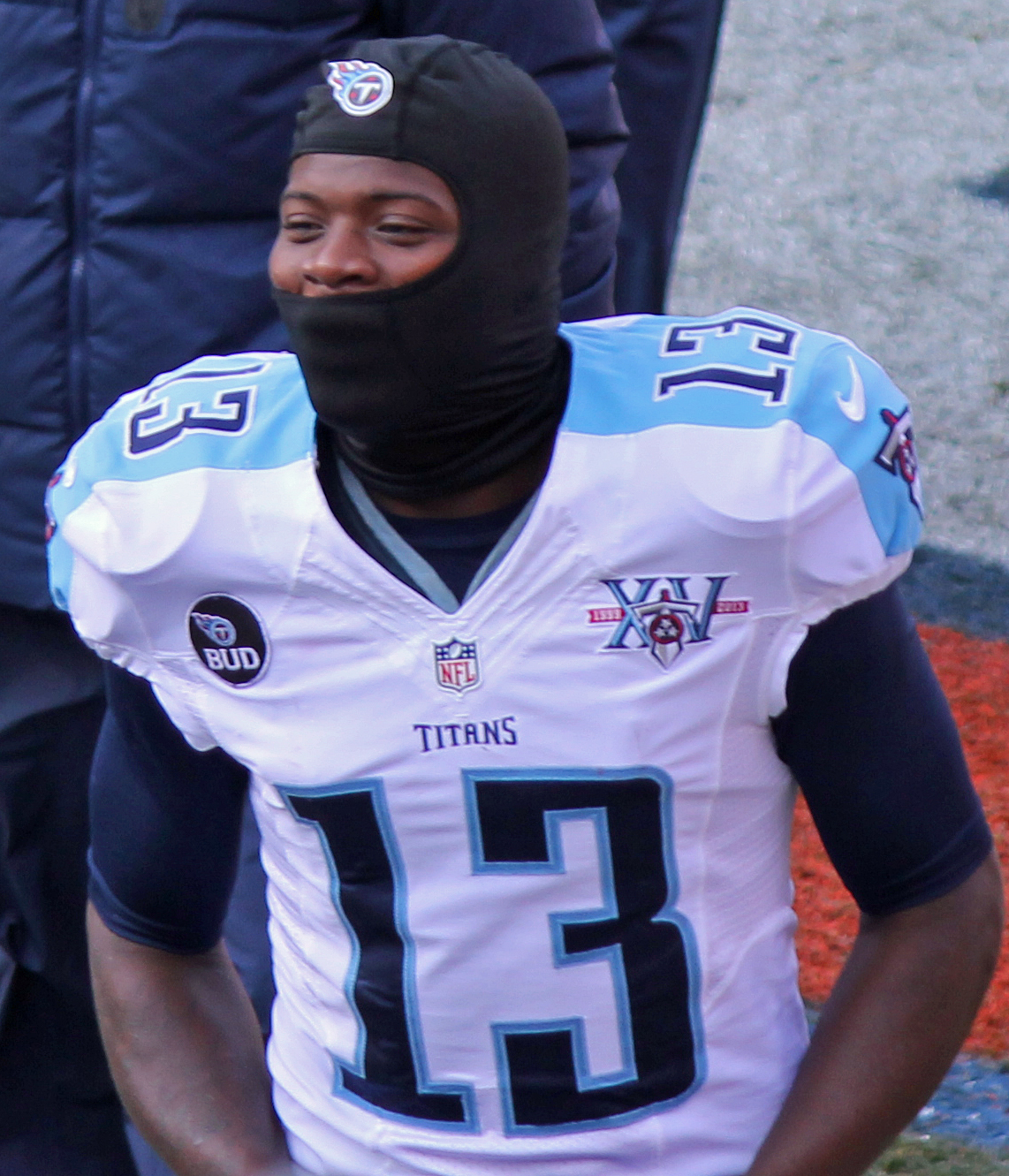
- Wright with the Tennessee Titans in 2013

No. 13
- Position: Wide receiver

Personal information
- Born: November 12, 1989 (age 36); Mount Pleasant, Texas, U.S.
- Listed height: 5 ft 10 in (1.78 m)
- Listed weight: 185 lb (84 kg)

Career information
- High school: Pittsburg (Pittsburg, Texas)
- College: Baylor (2008–2011)
- NFL draft: 2012: 1st round, 20th overall pick

Career history
- Tennessee Titans (2012–2016); Chicago Bears (2017); Minnesota Vikings (2018)*; Arizona Cardinals (2018); Toronto Argonauts (2021)*
- * Offseason or practice squad member only

Awards and highlights
- First-team All-American (2011); First-team All-Big 12 (2011); Second-team All-Big 12 (2010)

Career NFL statistics
- Receptions: 339
- Receiving yards: 3,858
- Receiving touchdowns: 19
- Stats at Pro Football Reference

Kendall Thomas Wright (born November 12, 1989) is an American former professional football player who was a wide receiver in the National Football League (NFL). He played college football for the Baylor Bears, earning All-American honors in 2011. He is their career leader in receptions, receiving yards, and receiving touchdowns. Wright was selected by the Tennessee Titans in the first round, 20th overall, of the 2012 NFL draft.

== Early life ==
Wright attended Pittsburg High School in Pittsburg, Texas, where he was a three-sport standout that earned All-state honors in football, basketball and track. In football, he excelled as a quarterback and cornerback, receiving second-team Class 3A All-State honors from the Texas Sports Writers Association and honorable mention by the Associated Press at both positions as a junior and senior. As a junior, he accounted for 26 total touchdowns and passed for 850 yards. As a senior quarterback, he rushed for 1,069 yards while passing for 1,170 yards, totalling 24 touchdowns.

As an All-State basketball performer, he averaged 24.5 points, six rebounds, five assists and five steals per game en route to receiving 2007 East Texas Player of the Year honors from the Tyler Morning Telegraph. He served as a youth basketball coach while still in high school.

Wright was also a track & field athlete, Wright captured the 2007 Texas Class 3A state long jump title, with a leap of 7.37 meters (24-0 3/4), as well as the state triple jump crown, with a leap of 14.81 meters (48-5 1/4). He received the 2008 Class 3A gold medal in the triple jump after setting a state meet-record leap of 15.48 meters (50-8 3/4).

== College career ==
As a true freshman at Baylor University in 2008, Wright played in all 12 games and led the Bears in receptions with 50, receiving yards with 649 yards and five touchdowns. The 50 receptions and 649 receiving yards were Baylor freshman records. He also played 13 games for the basketball team. As a sophomore in 2009, Wright again was the team's leading receiver with 66 receptions for 740 yards and five touchdowns. He was an All-Big 12 honorable mention. As a junior in 2010, he was named a second-team All-Big 12 selection after recording 78 receptions for 952 yards and seven touchdowns. The 78 receptions set a school record for most receptions in a season. In his senior season, Wright played in all 13 games and had 108 receptions for 1,633 yards with 14 touchdowns. Wright was named 1st Team All-American and All-Big 12.

== Professional career ==
Pre-draft measurables
Height	Weight	Arm length	Hand span	Wingspan	40-yard dash	10-yard split	20-yard split	20-yard shuttle	Three-cone drill	Vertical jump	Broad jump	Bench press
5 ft 10 1/4 in (1.78 m)	196 lb (89 kg)	30 1/2 in (0.77 m)	8 5/8 in (0.22 m)	6 ft 1 1/8 in (1.86 m)	4.42 s	1.53 s	2.65 s	4.18 s	6.93 s	38 1/2 in (0.98 m)	10 ft 1 in (3.07 m)	4 reps
All values from NFL Combine/Pro Day

=== Tennessee Titans ===
==== 2012 season ====
The Tennessee Titans selected Wright in the first round (20th overall) of the 2012 NFL draft. He was the third wide receiver selected in the 2012 NFL draft.

On July 23, 2012, the Titans signed Wright to a 4-year, $8.8 million contract with a signing bonus of $4.4 million and $7.5 million guaranteed.

As a rookie in 2012, Wright began the season as the third receiver on the depth chart. He played his first game on September 9, 2012, during the Titans season opener and made 5 catches for 37-yards. The next week he earned his first career start and had 2 receptions for 24-yards, while also catching a 15-yard touchdown from Jake Locker, in a 10–38 loss to the San Diego Chargers. On October 7, 2012, Wright caught a season-high 9 passes for 66 receiving yards in a loss at the Minnesota Vikings. In a Week 13 matchup against the rival Houston Texans, Wright had a season-high 78 receiving yards on 6 catches in the 10–24 loss. He finished his rookie year with 64 catches, 626 receiving yards, and 4 receiving touchdowns in 15 games and 5 starts.

==== 2013 season ====
Wright began Week 2 of the 2013 season making 7 catches for 54 receiving yards and his first touchdown of the season, in a 24–30 loss to the Texans. During Week 4 contest against the New York Jets, he earned his first start of the season, filling in for Kenny Britt, and finished the game with 5 receptions and 56 receiving yards. On November 24, 2013, Wright made 6 catches for 103-yards and his touchdown in a victory over the Oakland Raiders. It marked his first career game with over 100-yards receiving. Wright broke that receiving mark on December 15, when he caught a career-high 12 passes for 150 receiving yards in a 34–37 loss to the Arizona Cardinals. Wright finished the season with 94 receptions, 1,079 yards, and 2 touchdown catches in 16 games and 12 starts. This also marked his last season under Mike Munchak.

==== 2014 season ====
Wright began his first season under Ken Whisenhunt with 6 receptions for 46 yards and a touchdown in the season-opening win over the Kansas City Chiefs. On October 5, 2014, he hauled in 6 passes for 47-yards and his first 2 touchdown game of his career, in a 28–29 loss to the Cleveland Browns. In Week 13 at Houston, Wright racked up a season-high 132 receiving yards on 7 receptions, while also accounting for a 36-yard touchdown reception against the Texans. He finished the season with 57 receptions, 715 receiving yards, and a career-high 6 touchdown receptions in 14 games and 11 starts.

==== 2015 season ====
On April 23, 2015, the Titans picked up the fifth year/$7.32 million option of Wright's contract. In the season opener at Tampa, Wright made 4 receptions for 101-yards and caught a 52-yard touchdown from rookie Marcus Mariota. During a Week 5 loss to the Indianapolis Colts, he had a season-high 7 catches for 95-yards and a touchdown in a 33–35 loss. On November 1, 2015, he suffered a knee injury after making 4 receptions for 21-yards in a loss at the Texans.

==== 2016 season ====
Wright played in 11 games with four starts in 2016. He recorded 29 receptions for 416 yards and three touchdowns. While Wright's targets declined from 6.0 per game in 2015 to 3.9 per game in 2016, his 9.7 yards per target ranked No. 7 among NFL wide receivers. In Week 5 against the Cleveland Browns, he had eight receptions for 133 yards and a touchdown. Days after the season ended, Wright stated that he was "not a part of the 2017 Tennessee Titans", indicating he wanted to play elsewhere in 2017.

=== Chicago Bears ===
On March 11, 2017, Wright signed a one-year, $4 million contract with the Chicago Bears. On September 10, in his Bears debut, Wright had three receptions for 34 yards in the 23–17 home loss to the Atlanta Falcons at Soldier Field. He finished the season as the Bears' leading receiver with 59 receptions for 614 yards and one touchdown.

=== Minnesota Vikings ===
On March 30, 2018, Wright signed a one-year deal with the Minnesota Vikings. He was released by the Vikings on September 1.

=== Arizona Cardinals ===
On October 8, 2018, Wright signed a one-year contract with the Arizona Cardinals. He was released by Arizona on October 18. Wright was re-signed by the Cardinals on November 5, but was released by Arizona again on November 17.

=== Toronto Argonauts ===
On February 12, 2021, Wright signed with the Toronto Argonauts of the Canadian Football League (CFL). He was placed on the suspended list on July 10. Wright was released by the Argonauts on October 5.

== Career statistics ==
=== NFL ===
Year	Team	Games		Receiving					Rushing					Fumbles	
Year	Team	GP	GS	Rec	Yds	Avg	Lng	TD	Att	Yds	Avg	Lng	TD	Fum	Lost
2012	TEN	15	5	64	626	9.8	38	4	1	4	4.0	4	0	1	0
2013	TEN	16	12	94	1,079	11.5	45	2	0	0	0.0	0	0	2	0
2014	TEN	14	11	57	715	12.5	48	6	4	54	13.5	38	0	1	0
2015	TEN	10	9	36	408	11.3	52T	3	5	17	3.4	13	0	0	0
2016	TEN	11	4	29	416	14.3	48T	3	1	15	15.0	15	0	0	0
2017	CHI	16	4	59	614	10.4	22	1	0	0	0.0	0	0	0	0
Career		82	45	339	3,858	11.4	52T	19	11	90	8.2	38	0	4	0

=== College ===
Year	Team	GP	Receiving				Rushing			
Year	Team	GP	Rec	Yds	Avg	TD	Att	Yds	Avg	TD
2008	Baylor	12	50	649	13.0	5	29	168	5.8	1
2009	Baylor	12	66	740	11.2	4	28	132	4.7	1
2010	Baylor	13	78	952	12.2	7	8	53	6.6	0
2011	Baylor	13	108	1,663	15.4	14	10	72	7.2	0
Career		50	302	4,004	13.3	30	75	425	5.7	2
