= Terrance Ganaway =

American football player (born 1988)

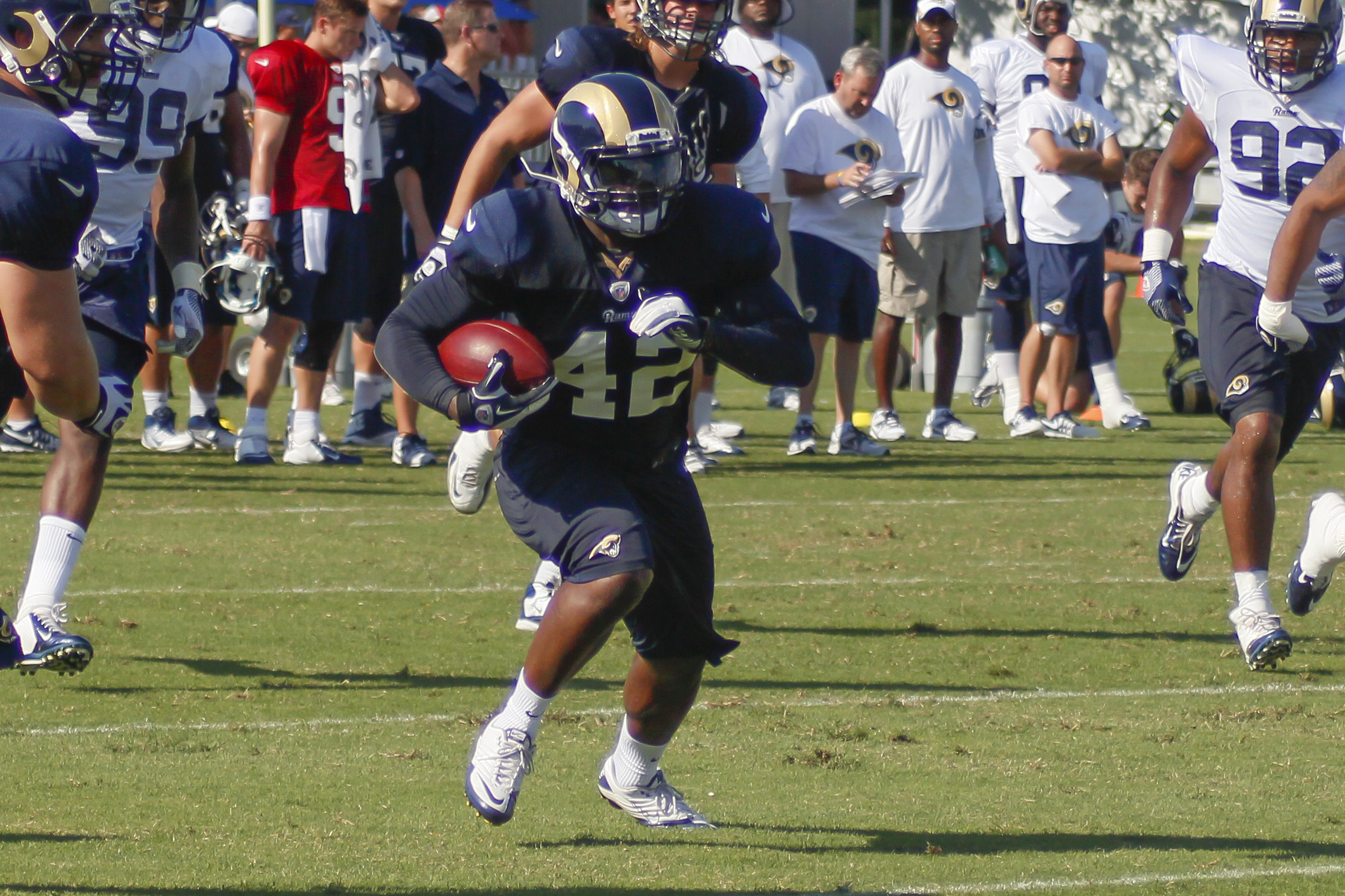
- Ganaway at the Rams training camp in 2013

No. 42
- Position: Running back

Personal information
- Born: October 7, 1988 (age 38); De Kalb, Texas, U.S.
- Listed height: 6 ft 0 in (1.83 m)
- Listed weight: 239 lb (108 kg)

Career information
- High school: De Kalb
- College: Baylor
- NFL draft: 2012: 6th round, 202nd overall pick

Career history
- New York Jets (2012)*; St. Louis Rams (2012)
- * Offseason or practice squad member only

Awards and highlights
- First-team All-Big 12 (2011)
- Stats at Pro Football Reference

Terrance Omar Ganaway (born October 7, 1988) is an American former professional football player who was a running back for one year with the St. Louis Rams of the National Football League (NFL). He played college football for the Houston Cougars and Baylor Bears. Ganaway was selected by the New York Jets in the sixth round of the 2012 NFL draft.

== College career ==
Ganaway played at the University of Houston as a freshman in 2007. Prior to the 2008 season, he transferred to Baylor, where he played until 2011. As a senior, he was a starter and rushed for 1,547 yards with 21 touchdowns. He was the offensive MVP of the 2011 Alamo Bowl, rushing for 200 yards and scoring five touchdowns in Baylor's 67-56 win over the University of Washington Huskies.

For his career, Ganaway had 2,592 rushing yards on 473 carries with 34 touchdowns.

== Professional career ==
Pre-draft measurables
Height	Weight	Arm length	Hand span	40-yard dash	10-yard split	20-yard split	20-yard shuttle	Three-cone drill	Vertical jump	Broad jump	Bench press
5 ft 11 1/2 in (1.82 m)	239 lb (108 kg)	31 5/8 in (0.80 m)	9 1/4 in (0.23 m)	4.54 s	1.58 s	2.60 s	4.25 s	7.15 s	37.5 in (0.95 m)	9 ft 11 in (3.02 m)	22 reps
All values from NFL Combine/Pro Day

=== New York Jets ===
The New York Jets drafted Ganaway using their sixth round selection in the 2012 NFL draft. Ganaway signed a four-year contract with the team on May 14, 2012. Ganaway was waived by the Jets as a part of final roster cuts on August 31.

=== St. Louis Rams ===
Ganaway was claimed off waivers by the St. Louis Rams on September 1, 2012. Ganaway announced his retirement from the league on August 21, 2013 to pursue his graduate degree.

== Personal life ==
Ganaway's uncle is former NFL linebacker Jeremiah Trotter and his cousins are Philadelphia Eagles linebacker Jeremiah Trotter Jr. and Tampa Bay Buccaneers linebacker Josiah Trotter.
