= Bryce Petty =

American football player (born 1991)

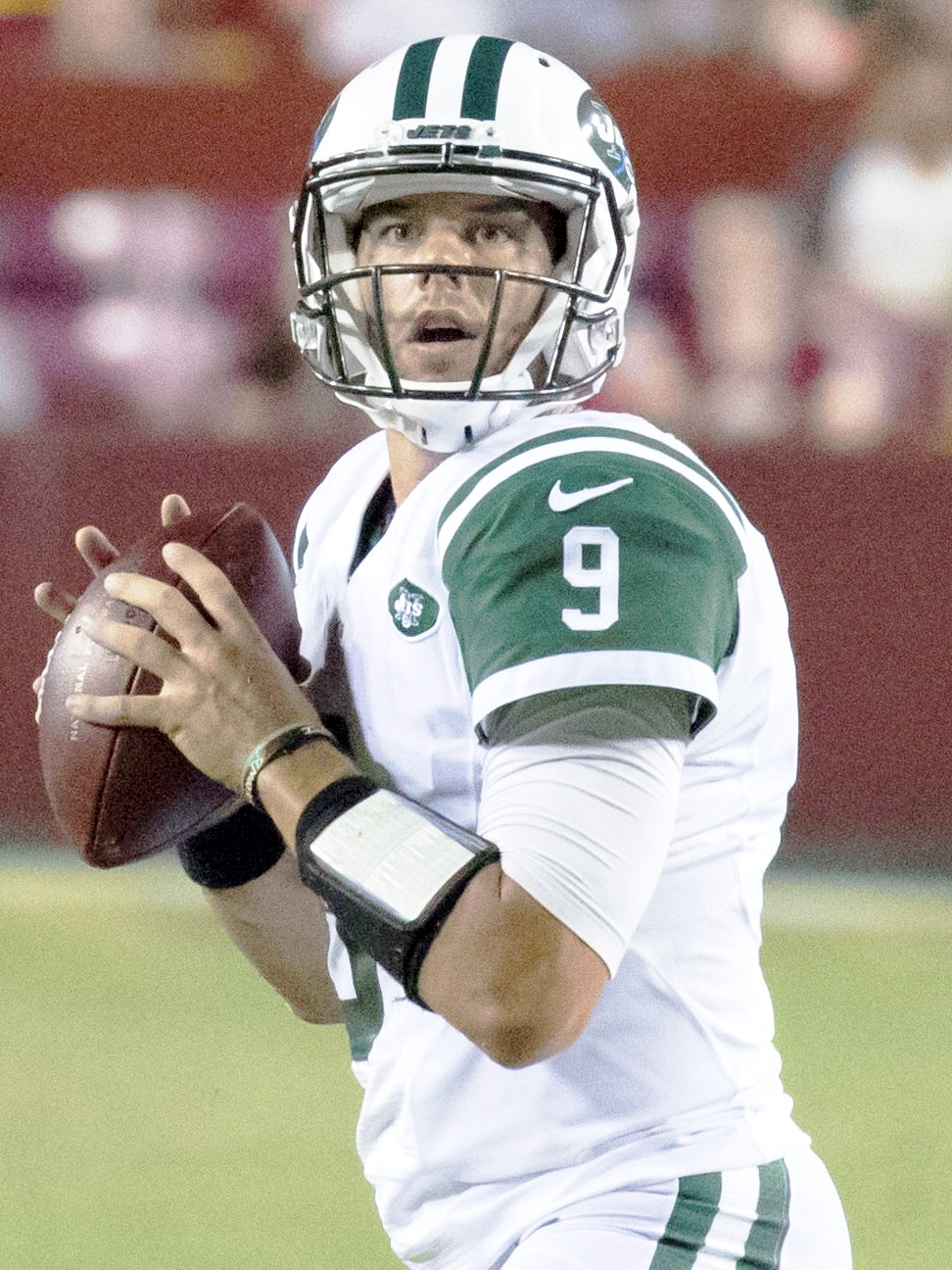
- Petty with the New York Jets in 2016

No. 9, 14
- Position: Quarterback

Personal information
- Born: May 31, 1991 (age 35); Thomaston, Georgia, U.S.
- Listed height: 6 ft 3 in (1.91 m)
- Listed weight: 226 lb (103 kg)

Career information
- High school: Midlothian (Midlothian, Texas)
- College: Baylor (2010–2014)
- NFL draft: 2015: 4th round, 103rd overall pick

Career history
- New York Jets (2015–2017); Miami Dolphins (2018)

Awards and highlights
- Earl Campbell Tyler Rose Award (2013); Big 12 Offensive Player of the Year (2013); First-team All-Big 12 (2013); Second-team All-Big 12 (2014)

Career NFL statistics
- Passing attempts: 245
- Passing completions: 130
- Completion percentage: 53.1%
- Passing yards: 1,353
- TD–INT: 4–10
- Passer rating: 57.7
- Stats at Pro Football Reference

Bryce William Petty (born May 31, 1991) is an American former professional football player who was a quarterback in the National Football League (NFL). He played college football for the Baylor Bears, and was selected by the New York Jets in the fourth round of the 2015 NFL draft.

== Early life ==
Petty is a member of the Chickasaw Nation. He attended Midlothian High School in Midlothian, Texas. He played football for Midlothian and was named District 15-4A Offensive Sophomore of the Year after throwing for 979 yards and four touchdowns in 2006. As a junior in 2007, Petty threw for 2,042 yards and 16 touchdowns while also rushing for 101 yards and five touchdowns, for which he was named first-team All-District 15-4A. As a senior in 2008, Petty earned second-team All-District 16-4A honors after throwing for 1,507 yards and four touchdowns and rushing for 166 yards and five more scores, even though he missed some action due to injury. In the national position ranking among quarterbacks, Petty was listed 25th by Rivals.com, 35th by Scout.com, and 54th by ESPN.com.

In addition to football, Petty played basketball and participated in track and field at Midlothian, competing in the throwing events and placing second at the 2008 District 16-4A Meet in the discus with a throw of 45.08 meters (147–9).

== College career ==
=== 2010–2012 ===
Petty attended Baylor University and played college football for the Bears football team from 2010 to 2014. He spent his first three years with the team as a backup. After redshirting in the 2010 season, Petty appeared in five games as a backup to Robert Griffin III as a redshirt freshman in the 2011 season. On the season, he passed for 43 yards. As a sophomore in the 2012 season, he backed up Nick Florence, throwing for 97 yards and a touchdown in six games.

=== 2013 season ===
Petty took over as the starting quarterback in the 2013 season, his junior year. In his first full season, he passed for 4,200 yards and 32 touchdowns with only three interceptions while also rushing for 14 touchdowns. The Bears won their first Big 12 conference title that season and appeared in the Bowl Championship Series game, the 2014 Fiesta Bowl, a 52–42 loss to Central Florida and future NFL quarterback Blake Bortles. In the 2013 season, Petty finished in seventh place in the Heisman Trophy voting.

=== 2014 season ===
As a senior in the 2014 season, Petty passed for 3,855 yards and 29 touchdowns along with six rushing touchdowns. He led the Bears to a share of their second straight Big 12 title as they appeared in the 2015 Cotton Bowl Classic, losing to Michigan State. He threw for a Cotton Bowl-record 550 yards and was named the game's offensive MVP. Petty finished tenth in the 2014 Heisman Trophy voting, receiving one first place vote.

== Professional career ==
Pre-draft measurables
| Height | Weight | Arm length | Hand span | 40-yard dash | 10-yard split | 20-yard split | 20-yard shuttle | Three-cone drill | Vertical jump | Broad jump | Wonderlic |
|---|---|---|---|---|---|---|---|---|---|---|---|
| 6 ft 3 in (1.91 m) | 230 lb (104 kg) | 31 7/8 in (0.81 m) | 10 in (0.25 m) | 4.87 s | 1.67 s | 2.81 s | 4.13 s | 6.91 s | 34 in (0.86 m) | 10 ft 1 in (3.07 m) | 31 |
All values from the NFL Combine

=== New York Jets ===
==== 2015 season ====
The New York Jets selected Petty in the fourth round, with the 103rd overall selection, of the 2015 NFL draft after the Jets traded up from the fifth spot in the round to the fourth spot with the Jacksonville Jaguars. On May 7, Petty and the Jets agreed on a four-year, $2.8 million contract.

Petty made his professional debut on August 13, during the first preseason game against the Detroit Lions where he completed 10-of-18 passes for 50 yards. In the second preseason game against the Atlanta Falcons on August 21, Petty threw for 168 passing yards with a touchdown. Throughout the season, Petty served as a third string backup behind veterans Ryan Fitzpatrick and Geno Smith and did not appear in any games.

==== 2016 season ====
On November 6, in a Week 9 game against the Jets' AFC East divisional rival Miami Dolphins, Petty saw his first regular season action in relief of Jets starter Ryan Fitzpatrick, who was injured in the third quarter of the game. Petty completed two passes for 19 yards in his one drive before Fitzpatrick returned. The Jets lost the game by a score of 27–23. Due to Fitzpatrick's injury in the previous game, Petty started for the Jets just a week later against the Los Angeles Rams, where he completed 21-of-34 passes for 163 yards, a touchdown, and an interception. The interception came on the last drive, resulting in a loss for the Jets. In a Monday Night Football game on December 5 against the Indianapolis Colts, Petty replaced the benched Fitzpatrick for the second half of the game with the Jets down 24–3 to the Colts. Petty went 11-for-25 in passing, totaling 135 yards, which included one touchdown pass and two interceptions in a 41–10 loss. On December 6, he was named the starter for the final four games of the season. After the game, Jets head coach Todd Bowles said, "The plan was for us to start him the last four games anyway, so we just started a half early." In Week 14 of the 2016 season, Petty notched his first career win as a starter, throwing for a career-high 257 yards as he helped lead the Jets to a 23–17 overtime victory after trailing the San Francisco 49ers 17–3 at halftime. In his third game as a starter, he helped the Jets keep the game close against the Miami Dolphins in the first half with the Dolphins only having a 13–10 lead. However, in the second half, a lousy effort by the Jets defense led to three touchdowns in four minutes by the Dolphins spoiled Petty's contributions, eventually leading to a 34–13 loss. On Christmas Eve against the New England Patriots, he injured his left shoulder in the second quarter after tackling cornerback Malcolm Butler after he recovered a fumble by running back Khiry Robinson in a 41–3 blowout loss. Two days later on December 26, he was placed on injured reserve, ending his season.

==== 2017 season ====
During the Jets' third preseason game against the New York Giants on August 26, Petty passed for 250 yards until leaving the game with an apparent left knee injury. On August 27, it was revealed that his left knee was diagnosed with a Grade 1 MCL sprain. During Week 14 against the Denver Broncos, Petty entered the game for two plays after Josh McCown suffered an apparent back injury. However, McCown then returned to the game before breaking his left hand and being relieved by Petty for the remainder of the contest. Petty completed 2 of 9 passes for 14 yards as the Jets lost by a score of 23–0. With McCown down for the rest of the season, Petty was named the starter. During Week 15 against the New Orleans Saints, Petty finished with 179 passing yards, a touchdown, and 2 interceptions as the Jets lost 19–31. During Week 16 against the Los Angeles Chargers, Petty was held to 119 passing yards with an interception as the Jets lost 7–14. During the season finale in Week 17 against the Patriots, Petty had 232 passing yards as the Jets lost 26–6. Overall, he finished the 2017 season with 544 passing yards, one touchdown, and three interceptions in four games.

On May 3, 2018, the Jets released Petty after three seasons.

=== Miami Dolphins ===
On May 4, 2018, Petty was claimed off waivers by the Miami Dolphins. He was waived/injured on September 1, and was placed on injured reserve. Petty was released by the Dolphins on September 25.

== Career statistics ==
=== NFL ===
| Year | Team | Games | | | Passing | | | | | | | | Rushing | | | | Sacks | | Fumbles (Note: Fumbles lost data taken from Pro Football Reference career game log) | |
| Year | Team | GP | GS | Record | Cmp | Att | Pct | Yds | Y/A | TD | Int | Rtg | Att | Yds | Avg | TD | Sck | SckY | Fum | Lost |
|---|---|---|---|---|---|---|---|---|---|---|---|---|---|---|---|---|---|---|---|---|
| 2015 | NYJ | 0 | 0 | DNP | | | | | | | | | | | | | | | | |
| 2016 | NYJ | 6 | 4 | 1–3 | 75 | 133 | 56.4 | 809 | 6.1 | 3 | 7 | 60.0 | 5 | 19 | 3.8 | 0 | 13 | 79 | 1 | 1 |
| 2017 | NYJ | 4 | 3 | 0–3 | 55 | 112 | 49.1 | 544 | 4.9 | 1 | 3 | 55.1 | 7 | 55 | 7.9 | 0 | 8 | 55 | 1 | 0 |
| Career | | 10 | 7 | 1–6 | 130 | 245 | 53.1 | 1,353 | 5.5 | 4 | 10 | 57.7 | 12 | 74 | 6.2 | 0 | 21 | 134 | 2 | 1 |

=== College ===
| Year | Team | Games | | | Passing | | | | | | | | Rushing | | | |
| Year | Team | GP | GS | Record | Cmp | Att | Pct | Yds | Avg | TD | Int | Rtg | Att | Yds | Avg | TD |
|---|---|---|---|---|---|---|---|---|---|---|---|---|---|---|---|---|
| 2010 | Baylor | Redshirt (redshirt) | | | | | | | | | | | | | | |
| 2011 | Baylor | 6 | 0 | 0–0 | 3 | 4 | 75.0 | 43 | 10.8 | 0 | 0 | 165.3 | 4 | 15 | 3.8 | 0 |
| 2012 | Baylor | 6 | 0 | 0–0 | 7 | 10 | 70.0 | 97 | 9.7 | 1 | 0 | 184.5 | 10 | 13 | 1.3 | 1 |
| 2013 | Baylor | 13 | 13 | 11–2 | 250 | 403 | 62.0 | 4,200 | 10.4 | 32 | 3 | 174.3 | 94 | 209 | 2.2 | 14 |
| 2014 | Baylor | 12 | 12 | 10–2 | 270 | 428 | 63.1 | 3,855 | 9.0 | 29 | 7 | 157.8 | 84 | 101 | 1.2 | 6 |
| Career | | 37 | 25 | 21–4 | 530 | 845 | 62.7 | 8,195 | 9.7 | 62 | 10 | 166.0 | 192 | 338 | 1.8 | 21 |
