= Jay Finley =

American football player (born 1988)

No. 23
- Position: Running back

Personal information
- Born: May 15, 1988 (age 38); Corsicana, Texas, U.S.
- Listed height: 5 ft 11 in (1.80 m)
- Listed weight: 203 lb (92 kg)

Career information
- High school: Corsicana (TX)
- College: Baylor
- NFL draft: 2011: 7th round, 246th overall pick

Career history
- Cincinnati Bengals (2011)*; Seattle Seahawks (2011)*; Tri-Cities Fever (2014)*
- * Offseason or practice squad member only
- Stats at Pro Football Reference

Jay Finley (born May 15, 1988) is an American former professional football player who was a running back in the National Football League (NFL). He was selected by the Cincinnati Bengals in the seventh round of the 2011 NFL draft. He played college football at Baylor.

== College career ==
Finley played his college career for the Baylor University Bears in Waco, Texas. Finley started his career at Baylor sporting the number 32 but finished wearing 23, the number he wore during his early career. Finley graduated in May with a degree in general studies.

Finley finished off his freshman year with 55 attempts for 207 yards, 3.8 yards per carry, with two rushing touchdowns. On top of that he added 18 receptions for 152 yards and another score.

Finley finished his sophomore year with 149 carries for 865 yards, 5.8 yards per carry and seven rushing touchdowns. He added seven receptions for 141 (20.1 yards per catch) and two more touchdowns.

Although Finley started his third year atop the depth chart at running back, he struggled battling an ankle injury throughout the season. It hampered his production, carrying the ball 79 times for 370 yards, dropping his per carry average to 4.7. His receptions didn't drop much as he had six for 47 yards. He had one touchdown on the season (rushing).

Finley finally secured his breakout season in his final year of eligibility rushing for 1,218 yards on 195 carries, an impressive 6.2 yards per carry. That is behind only Terrance Ganaway's 1,347 yards for the team's single season record. While the number of receptions Finley had increased to nine, he only had 76 yards. The 12 touchdowns Finley accumulated during the season all came on the ground. He averaged 93.69 yards per game.

Finley's career at Baylor ended with him first in single season rushing yards, single game rushing yards at 250, third in career rushing yards at 2,660, and fourth in career touchdowns at 22.

== Professional career ==
Pre-draft measurables
Height	Weight	Arm length	Hand span	40-yard dash	10-yard split	20-yard split	20-yard shuttle	Three-cone drill	Vertical jump	Broad jump	Bench press
5 ft 10 7/8 in (1.80 m)	203 lb (92 kg)	31 in (0.79 m)	9 1/4 in (0.23 m)	4.51 s	1.59 s	2.57 s	4.36 s	7.39 s	39.5 in (1.00 m)	11 ft 0 in (3.35 m)	14 reps
All values from Pro Day

Finley had a 550-pound squat at his pro day. He was drafted with the Cincinnati Bengals' seventh round pick, number 248. Cincinnati.com reported the Bengals had signed running back Finley to a rookie contract on July 30. He was waived on September 3. He was signed to the Seattle Seahawks' practice squad on December 6, 2011.
