= Reggie Newhouse =

American football player (born 1981)

No. 18, 87
- Position: Wide receiver

Personal information
- Born: February 16, 1981 (age 45); Dallas, Texas, U.S.
- Listed height: 6 ft 1 in (1.85 m)
- Listed weight: 191 lb (87 kg)

Career information
- High school: Lake Highlands (Dallas)
- College: Baylor
- NFL draft: 2003: undrafted

Career history
- Arizona Cardinals (2003–2005); New York Jets (2006)*
- * Offseason or practice squad member only

Career NFL statistics
- Receptions: 5
- Receiving yards: 50
- Receiving touchdowns: 0
- Stats at Pro Football Reference

Reginald Jahon Newhouse (born February 16, 1981) is an American former professional football player who was a wide receiver in the National Football League (NFL). He was signed by the Arizona Cardinals as an undrafted free agent in 2003 after playing college football for the Baylor Bears.

His father Robert was a running back in the NFL for the Dallas Cowboys.
