= Ishmael Zamora =

American football player (born 1995)

Profile
- Position: Wide receiver

Personal information
- Born: November 26, 1995 (age 30); Houston, Texas
- Listed height: 6 ft 3 in (1.91 m)
- Listed weight: 224 lb (102 kg)

Career information
- High school: Alief (TX) Elsik
- College: Baylor
- NFL draft: 2017: undrafted

Career history
- Oakland Raiders (2017)*; San Antonio Commanders (2019)*; Baltimore Brigade (2019)*; Washington Valor (2019)*
- * Offseason or practice squad member only
- Stats at Pro Football Reference

Ishmael Carlos Zamora (born November 26, 1995) is an American football wide receiver. He played college football at Baylor and is currently a free agent.

== Early life and college ==
Zamora attended Alief Elsik High School, where he was ranked the 231st best high school football prospect and 32nd wide receiver according to ESPN. He decided to play football for Baylor University. At Baylor, he was redshirted as a freshman in 2014. As a redshirt freshman in 2015 he caught nine passes for 132 yards and two touchdowns. As a redshirt sophomore in 2016 he finished second on the team in receptions (63), receiving yards (809) and receiving touchdowns (8) behind K. D. Cannon. Zamora averaged 6.5 receptions per game in 2016, which ranked second in the Big 12 Conference.

After a video circulated in the news showing him beating a dog with a belt, Zamora was charged with misdemeanor animal abuse and suspended for three games during Baylor's 2016 season. The episode heavily affected his stock in the NFL draft, and he reportedly was not invited to participate in the NFL Scouting Combine.

== Professional career ==
Zamora signed with the Oakland Raiders as an undrafted free agent on May 5, 2017. He was waived on September 2, 2017. On March 6, 2019, Zamora was assigned to the Baltimore Brigade. On April 10, 2019, Zamora was traded to the Washington Valor. On April 19, 2019, Zamora was placed on reassignment.
