= Nick Florence =

American football player (born 1989)

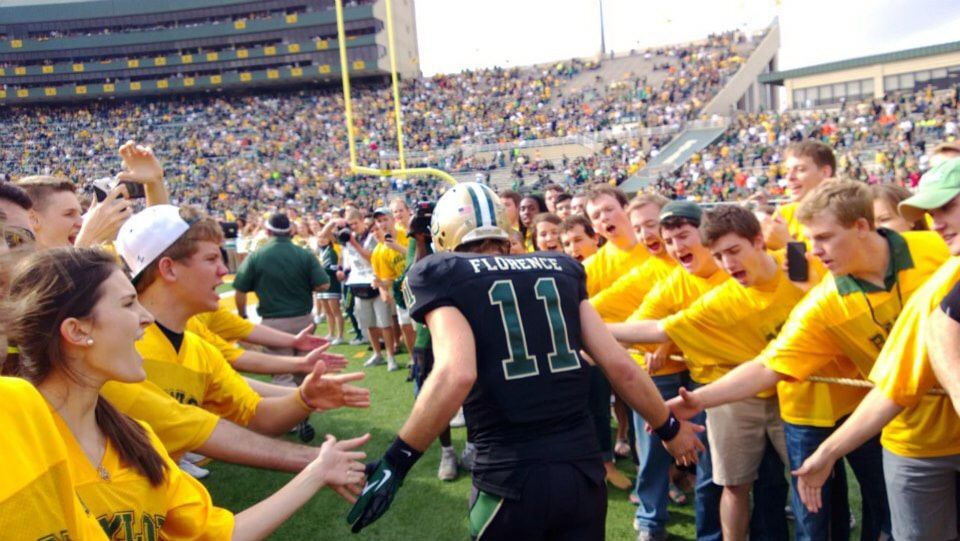

No. 11
- Position: Quarterback

Personal information
- Born: June 21, 1989 (age 37); Dallas, Texas, U.S.
- Listed height: 6 ft 1 in (1.85 m)
- Listed weight: 205 lb (93 kg)

Career information
- High school: South Garland (TX)
- College: Baylor (2009–2012)

Awards and highlights
- NCAA passing yards leader (2012)
- Stats at ESPN

Nicolas Daryl Florence (born June 21, 1989) is an American former college football quarterback who played for the Baylor Bears. He led the NCAA in passing yards in 2012.

== Early life ==
Florence attended South Garland High School in Garland, Texas. During this career, he threw for 8,001 yards and 87 touchdowns. He was rated a three-star recruit by the Rivals.com recruiting service, and ranked as the 22nd-best dual-threat quarterback recruit in his class by Rivals.

== College career ==
As a true freshman in 2009, Florence started the season as the third-string quarterback. After injuries to Robert Griffin III and Blake Szymanski, Florence took over as the starter and started seven of the next nine games. He finished the season completing 165 of 266 passes for 1,786 yards with six touchdowns and nine interceptions. Florence returned to backup as a sophomore in 2010 and played in seven games, completing 6 of 12 passes for 55 yards. As a junior in 2011, he played in two games as a backup, completing 9 of 12 passes for 151 yards with two touchdowns. Florence became the starter in 2012 after Griffin entered the NFL. He finished the season completing 286 of 464 passes for 4,309 yards with 33 touchdowns and 13 interceptions. He also had 568 rushing yards and 10 touchdowns.

In the 2012 Bridgepoint Education Holiday Bowl, he broke Griffin's single-season passing yards record.

After completing his Baylor career in the 2012 Bridgepoint Education Holiday Bowl, Florence elected not to pursue the NFL and focused instead on completing his master's degree at Baylor Florence is now working at Baylor University as a managing director of development.

== See also ==
- List of NCAA major college football yearly passing leaders
