= Tevin Reese =

American football player (born 1991)

No. 16, 84
- Position: Wide receiver

Personal information
- Born: January 2, 1991 (age 35); Temple, Texas, U.S.
- Listed height: 5 ft 10 in (1.78 m)
- Listed weight: 170 lb (77 kg)

Career information
- High school: Temple (TX)
- College: Baylor
- NFL draft: 2014: 7th round, 240th overall pick

Career history
- San Diego Chargers (2014)*; Cincinnati Bengals (2014–2015)*; Winnipeg Blue Bombers (2016)*
- * Offseason or practice squad member only

Awards and highlights
- First-team All-Big 12 (2013)
- Stats at Pro Football Reference

Tevin Karnell Reese (born January 2, 1991) is an American former professional football wide receiver. He was selected by the San Diego Chargers in the seventh round of the 2014 NFL draft. He played college football at Baylor.

== Early life ==
Reese was a dual-sport athlete that excelled in football and track & field at Temple High School. He helped to lead the Wildcats to 7-4 record, bi-district finals and District 13-5A championship in 2007, with 542 yards and three touchdowns on 31 receptions as senior, and also totaled 391 yards on 17 kick returns and two rushes for 26 yards and 1 touchdown. As a junior in 2008, he was named second-team All-District 12-5A wide receiver senior, and earned an honorable mention All-District 13-5A honors.

=== Track and field ===
Reese was an standout athlete for the Temple High School track team. He qualified for the 2008 Class 5A state meet in triple jump and long jump as a junior, and also earned a bronze medal in the 300-meter hurdles, with a career-best time of 37.65 seconds. He was named one of top 50 area athletes for 2007-08 school year by Austin American-Statesman.

He set school records in the triple jump, with a leap of 14.67 meters, the long jump, with 6.90 meters and in the 300-meter hurdles as junior. He also earned an honorable mention selection to the 2008 Super Centex All-Academic team.

He also competed in the 110-meter hurdles, and had a career-best time of 13.75 seconds.

== College career ==
As a sophomore in 2011, Reese made seven starts at wide receiver and played in all 13 games. He earned honorable mention All-Big 12 honors from league's coaches. He totaled 51 receptions for 877 yards and seven touchdowns, all of which ranked third on team, and also rushed five times for 102 yards.

As a junior in 2012, he started in 12 of 13 games. He earned All-Big 12 honorable mention from league's coaches. He totaled 957 yards and nine touchdowns on 53 receptions, and also added four rushes for 21 yards. He ranked eighth in Big 12 with 73.6 receiving-yards-per-game.

As a senior in 2013, he started eight of nine games at wide receiver, missed four games due to broken wrist. He was named All-Big 12. He totaled 38 receptions for 867 yards and eight touchdowns. He averaged 22.82 yards-per-reception, which ranks second on Baylor's single-season chart and 96.33 yards-per-game, fourth on single-season chart.

== Professional career ==
Pre-draft measurables
| Height | Weight | 40-yard dash | 10-yard split | 20-yard split | 20-yard shuttle | Three-cone drill | Vertical jump | Broad jump |
|---|---|---|---|---|---|---|---|---|
| 5 ft 11 in (1.80 m) | 163 lb (74 kg) | 4.41 s | 1.52 s | 2.57 s | 4.18 s | 6.63 s | 41 in (1.04 m) | 11 ft 0 in (3.35 m) |
All values from NFL Combine

=== San Diego Chargers ===
Reese was drafted in the seventh round, 240th overall by the San Diego Chargers. He was subsequently waived by the Chargers on August 29, 2014.

=== Cincinnati Bengals ===
Reese was signed to the Cincinnati Bengals' practice squad on September 3, 2014. He was released by the Bengals on August 31, 2015.

=== Winnipeg Blue Bombers ===
Reese signed with the Winnipeg Blue Bombers on March 15, 2016. He retired in April 2016.
