= Antwan Goodley =

American football player (born 1991)

Profile
- Position: Wide receiver

Personal information
- Born: September 6, 1991 (age 35); Midland, Texas, U.S.
- Listed height: 5 ft 10 in (1.78 m)
- Listed weight: 212 lb (96 kg)

Career information
- High school: Midland (TX)
- College: Baylor
- NFL draft: 2015: undrafted

Career history
- Dallas Cowboys (2015)*; Seattle Seahawks (2015–2016)*; Green Bay Packers (2016–2017)*; Kansas City Chiefs (2017)*; Baltimore Brigade (2019)*; Oklahoma Flying Aces (2024)
- * Offseason or practice squad member only

Awards and highlights
- First-team All-Big 12 (2013)
- Stats at Pro Football Reference

Antwan Fontain Goodley Jr. (born September 6, 1991) is an American professional football wide receiver. He played college football at Baylor.

== Early life ==
Goodley attended Midland High School in Midland, Texas. He played wide receiver, cornerback and returned kicks. He was a three-year starter under head coach Craig Yenzer. As a senior, he was named first-team All-District 2-5A and first-team All-Permian Basin (by Odessa American) after totaling 613 yards on 38 receptions and four touchdown catches, four rushes for 55 yards and one rushing touchdown, and three touchdowns on kick returns. He finished his career with school-record 1,747 receiving yards. He was ranked by ESPN.com as the 73rd best receiver in the nation. and 119th by Scout.com.

In track, he won the 200 meters at the 2008 District 3-5A Meet with a time of 21.82 seconds. He was also part of the 4x100 relay team that set the school record with a time of 41.06 seconds. He currently holds the school's fastest 200-meter dash time ever, at 21.4 seconds.

== College career ==
Goodley played college football at Baylor University from 2010 to 2014. During his collegiate career, he earned All-American honors as a wide receiver and recorded 150 receptions for 2,366 yards and 21 touchdowns.

== Professional career ==
=== Dallas Cowboys ===
Goodley signed with the Dallas Cowboys as an undrafted free agent on May 2, 2015. On September 1, 2015, he was released by the Cowboys.

=== Seattle Seahawks ===
On December 9, 2015 Goodley was signed to the Seahawks practice squad.

On September 3, 2016, Goodley was released by the Seahawks as part of final roster cuts. On September 13, 2016, he was signed to the Seahawks' practice squad. He was released on September 27, 2016.

=== Green Bay Packers ===
On December 27, 2016, Goodley was signed to the Packers practice squad. He signed a futures contract with the Packers on January 24, 2017. He was waived/injured by the Packers on May 8, 2017 and was placed on injured reserve. He was waived from injured reserve on June 15, 2017.

=== Kansas City Chiefs ===
On July 28, 2017, Goodley signed with the Kansas City Chiefs, only to be waived/injured three days later and placed on injured reserve. He was released on August 22, 2017.

=== Baltimore Brigade ===
On April 6, 2019, Goodley was assigned to the Baltimore Brigade. On April 12, 2019, he was placed on recallable reassignment and became a free agent.

=== Oklahoma Flying Aces ===
On January 1, 2024, Goodley signed with the Oklahoma Flying Aces of the National Arena League (NAL).
