= Lache Seastrunk =

American football player (born 1991)

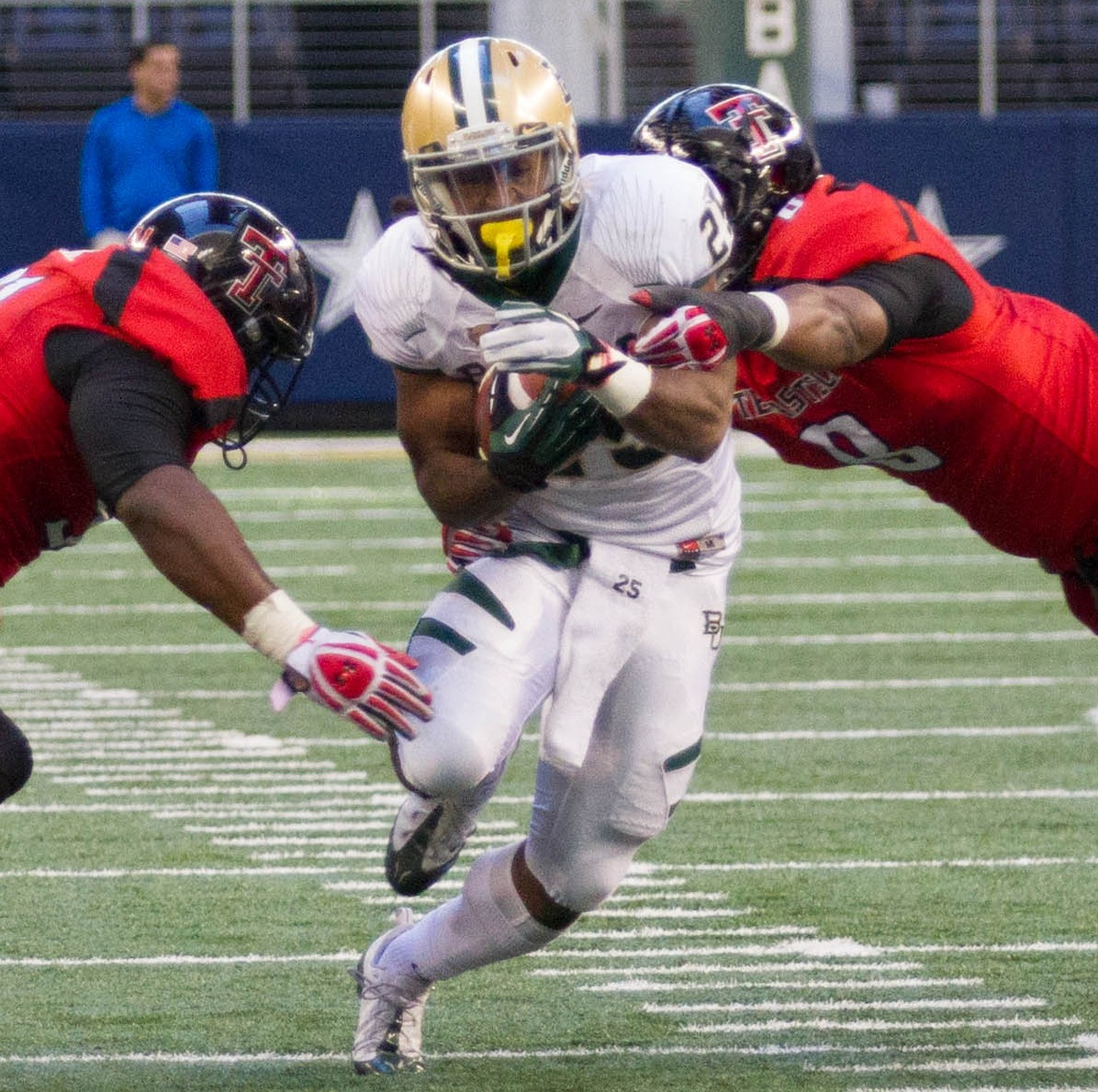
- Seastrunk with the Baylor Bears in 2012

No. 30, 35, 36, 37
- Position: Running back

Personal information
- Born: July 29, 1991 (age 35); Temple, Texas, U.S.
- Listed height: 5 ft 10 in (1.78 m)
- Listed weight: 210 lb (95 kg)

Career information
- High school: Temple (TX)
- College: Baylor
- NFL draft: 2014: 6th round, 186th overall pick

Career history
- Washington Redskins (2014)*; Carolina Panthers (2014)*; Tennessee Titans (2014–2015)*; Dallas Cowboys (2015)*; Calgary Stampeders (2016)*; Saskatchewan Roughriders (2016)*; New York Jets (2016)*; CenTex Cavalry (2017); Winnipeg Blue Bombers (2017)*
- * Offseason or practice squad member only

Awards and highlights
- First-team All-Big 12 (2013); Big 12 Offensive Newcomer of the Year (2012)
- Stats at Pro Football Reference

Lache J. Seastrunk (pronounced /ˈleɪk/; born July 29, 1991) is an American former professional football running back. He played college football at Baylor. Seastrunk was selected by the Washington Redskins in the sixth round of the 2014 NFL draft.

== Early life ==
A native of Temple, Texas, Seastrunk attended Temple High School, where he finished his high school career with 4,127 yards and 52 touchdowns. He was a 2009 USA Today All-USA selection. Regarded as a five-star prospect by Rivals.com, he was listed as the No. 3 running back in the class of 2010. He played in the 2010 U.S. Army All-American Bowl. He chose Oregon over Auburn among others.

The process of his recruitment was part of a 27-month NCAA investigation into alleged recruiting rules violations by Oregon in using a middleman, Willie Lyles, to secure both Seastrunk and LaMichael James for the Ducks; the results were three years' probation and taking away of three scholarships.

Seastrunk was also a standout track athlete, he has personal bests of 10.50 seconds in the 100 meters and 6.60 meters in long jump during his preparatory track career. He clocked at 10.64 in the 100 meters as a sophomore and won the district meet that same year with a time of 10.77 seconds. He broke three Temple High School records (100 meters, 400 meters and long jump) as a 13-year-old eighth-grader.

== College career ==
Seastrunk attended the University of Oregon for his freshman year. On August 20, 2011 it was reported that Seastrunk was granted a release from Oregon with plans to transfer to Baylor University.

Before the end of the 2012 season, Seastrunk predicted he would win the Heisman Trophy next year and said "I know I am the best back in the country." Seastrunk finished the season with 1,012 yards on 131 carries but averaged 138.2 yards per game and scored five touchdowns during Baylor's 4-1 run to end the season. He did not win the Heisman Trophy.

Seastrunk announced on January 6, 2014 that he would forgo his senior season and enter the 2014 NFL draft.

=== College statistics ===
Year	Team	Rushing					Receiving		
Year	Team	Att	Yds	Avg	Lng	TD	Rec	Yds	TD
2012	Baylor	131	1,012	7.7	80	7	9	107	1
2013	Baylor	158	1,177	7.4	80	11	0	0	0
Career		289	2,189	7.6	80	18	9	107	1

== Professional career ==
Pre-draft measurables
Height	Weight	Arm length	Hand span	40-yard dash	Vertical jump	Broad jump	Bench press
5 ft 9 in (1.75 m)	201 lb (91 kg)	30 in (0.76 m)	9 1/4 in (0.23 m)	4.51 s	41.5 in (1.05 m)	11 ft 2 in (3.40 m)	15 reps
All values from NFL Combine.

Seastrunk was selected by the Washington Redskins with the 186th overall pick in the 2014 NFL draft. He signed a four-year, $2.33 million contract with the Redskins on May 16, 2014. The Redskins waived him on August 30, 2014 for final roster cuts before the start of the 2014 season, losing the third-string running back position to fellow rookie Silas Redd. He was not signed to the practice squad.

Seastrunk was signed to the practice squad of the Carolina Panthers on September 16, 2014. He was waived from the team on September 25.

Seastrunk was signed to the practice squad of the Tennessee Titans on October 1, 2014. He signed a futures contract with the Titans on December 29. Seastrunk was waived from the team on May 18, 2015.

Seastrunk signed with the Dallas Cowboys on June 27, 2015. He was waived by Dallas on August 20.

On May 19, 2016, Seastrunk signed with the Calgary Stampeders of the Canadian Football League (CFL). On June 19, Seastrunk was released by the Stampeders.

On June 26, 2016, Seastrunk was signed to the Saskatchewan Roughriders' practice roster.

Seastrunk was signed by the New York Jets on August 13, 2016. On August 28, Seastrunk was waived by the Jets.

Seastrunk signed with the CenTex Cavalry of Champions Indoor Football (CIF) on April 10, 2017.

On May 11, 2017, Seastrunk signed with the Winnipeg Blue Bombers of the CFL. He was released before the start of the regular season on May 28.
