= K. D. Cannon =

American gridiron football player (born 1995)

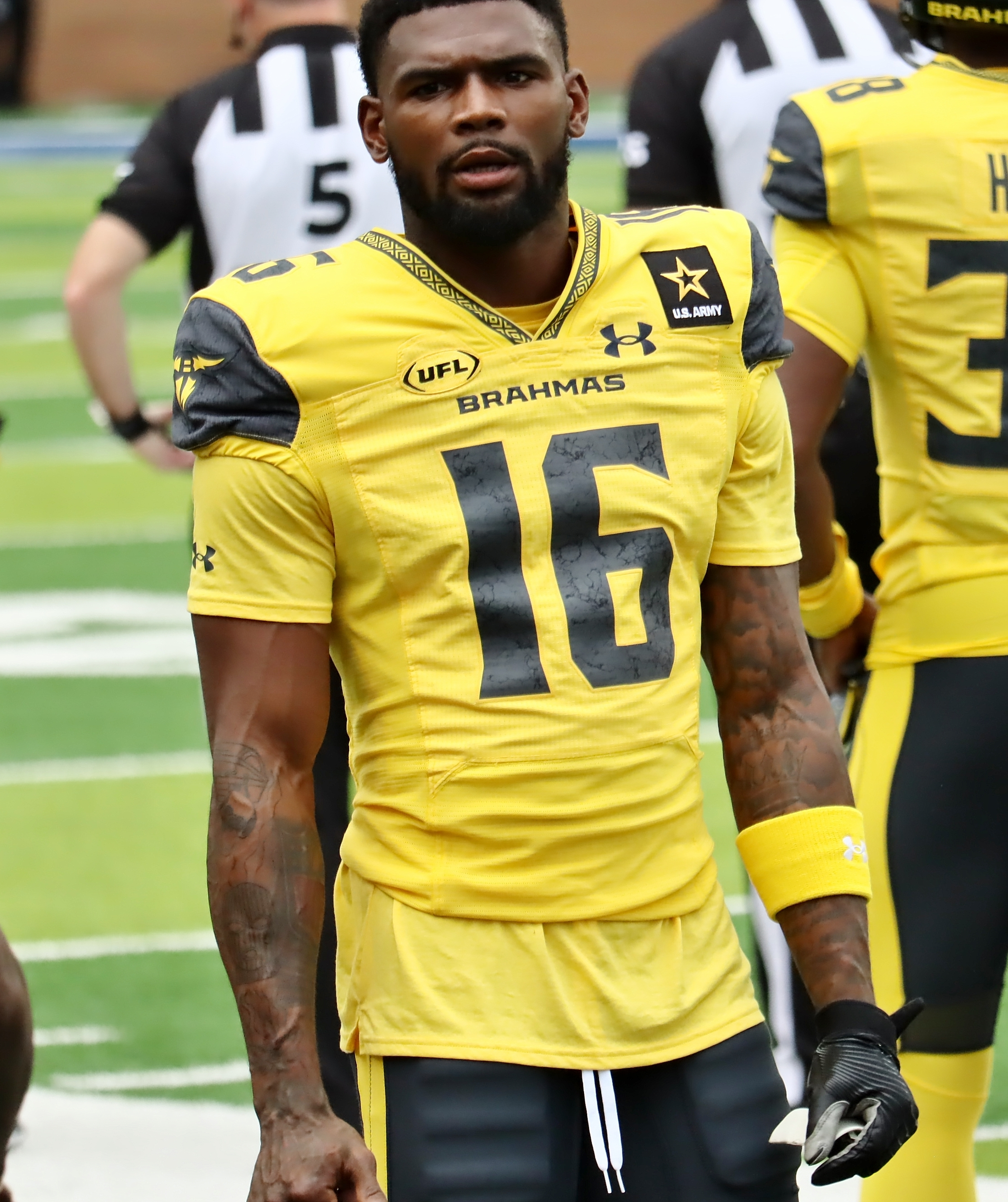
- Cannon with the San Antonio Brahmas in 2024

No. 15, 16
- Position: Wide receiver

Personal information
- Born: November 5, 1995 (age 31); Mount Pleasant, Texas, U.S.
- Listed height: 5 ft 11 in (1.80 m)
- Listed weight: 183 lb (83 kg)

Career information
- High school: Mount Pleasant (Mount Pleasant, Texas)
- College: Baylor
- NFL draft: 2017: undrafted

Career history
- San Francisco 49ers (2017)*; New York Jets (2017)*; Los Angeles Rams (2017)*; Dallas Cowboys (2017–2018)*; Saskatchewan Roughriders (2018–2019); Los Angeles Wildcats (2020)*; Seattle Dragons (2020); Vegas Knight Hawks (2022); DC Defenders (2023); Orlando Guardians (2023); San Antonio Brahmas (2024)
- * Offseason or practice squad member only

Awards and highlights
- First-team All-Big 12 (2016); Second-team All-Big 12 (2015)
- Stats at Pro Football Reference

Ka'Darius O'Keith Cannon (born November 5, 1995) is an American former football wide receiver. He played college football at Baylor.

== Early life ==
Cannon attended Mount Pleasant High School in Mount Pleasant, Texas. He had over 1,000 yards his final three seasons, including 1,252 as a senior with 80 receptions and 16 touchdowns. Cannon was ranked by Rivals.com as a four-star recruit and was ranked among the best wide receivers in his class. He committed to Baylor University to play college football.

== College career ==
As a true freshman, Cannon played in all 13 games. He finished the season with Baylor freshman records 58 receptions for 1,030 yards and 8 touchdowns. As a Sophomore, Cannon played in all 13 games recording 50 receptions for 868 yards and 6 touchdowns. Following up a solid sophomore season with a great junior year, Cannon finished the year with 87 receptions for 1,215 yards and 13 receiving touchdowns. Cannon declared for the 2017 NFL Draft on December 28, 2016, after a huge performance in the Cactus Bowl in which he had 14 receptions for 226 yards and 2 touchdowns. After the season, Cannon announced that he decided he would forgo his senior year and enter the 2017 NFL draft.

=== College statistics ===
			Receiving		
Season	Team	GP	Rec	Yds	TDs
2014	Baylor	13	58	1,030	8
2015	Baylor	13	50	868	6
2016	Baylor	12	87	1,215	13
College totals		38	195	3,113	27

== Professional career ==
Pre-draft measurables
Height	Weight	Arm length	Hand span	40-yard dash	10-yard split	20-yard split	20-yard shuttle	Three-cone drill	Vertical jump	Broad jump	Bench press
5 ft 11 1/8 in (1.81 m)	182 lb (83 kg)	30 3/4 in (0.78 m)	8 7/8 in (0.23 m)	4.41 s	1.58 s	2.60 s	4.43 s	7.10 s	37 in (0.94 m)	9 ft 9 in (2.97 m)	13 reps
All values from NFL Combine

=== San Francisco 49ers ===
After going undrafted in the 2017 NFL draft, Cannon signed with the San Francisco 49ers as an undrafted free agent on April 29, 2017, but was waived by the 49ers on May 8, 2017, following their rookie mini-camp.

=== New York Jets ===
On May 9, 2017, Cannon was claimed off waivers by the New York Jets. He was waived on July 28, 2017.

=== Los Angeles Rams ===
On August 4, 2017, Cannon was signed by the Los Angeles Rams. He was waived on September 2, 2017.

=== Dallas Cowboys ===
On December 27, 2017, Cannon was signed to the Dallas Cowboys' practice squad. He signed a reserve/future contract with the Cowboys on January 1, 2018.

On September 1, 2018, Cannon was waived by the Cowboys.

=== Saskatchewan Roughriders ===
Cannon signed with the Saskatchewan Roughriders of the Canadian Football League (CFL) on October 7, 2018.

Cannon was moved to the Roughriders' practice roster on July 31, 2019, and was released on August 5, 2019.

=== Los Angeles Wildcats ===
In October 2019, Cannon was drafted by the Los Angeles Wildcats in the 2020 XFL draft. He was waived during final roster cuts on January 21, 2020.

=== Seattle Dragons ===
Cannon signed with the XFL's Team 9 practice squad during the regular season. He was signed off of Team 9 by the Seattle Dragons on March 9, 2020. He had his contract terminated when the league suspended operations on April 10, 2020.

=== Vegas Knight Hawks ===
Cannon was signed by the Vegas Knight Hawks for the 2022 Indoor Football League season. He was released on November 2, 2022.

=== DC Defenders ===
Cannon was selected in the third round of the 2023 XFL Skill Players Draft, by the DC Defenders. He was released on March 22, 2023.

=== Orlando Guardians ===
Cannon was signed by the Orlando Guardians on March 27, 2023. The Guardians folded when the XFL and USFL merged to create the United Football League (UFL).

=== San Antonio Brahmas ===
On January 15, 2024, Cannon was selected by the San Antonio Brahmas in the sixth round of the Super Draft portion during the 2024 UFL dispersal draft. He signed with the team on January 31. He was waived on August 23, 2024.

=== Retirement ===
On February 20, 2025, Cannon announced in an Instagram post that he was officially retiring from professional football.
