= 2012 Oklahoma State Cowboys football team =

American college football season

2012 Oklahoma State Cowboys football

Heart of Dallas Bowl champion

Heart of Dallas Bowl, W 58–14 vs. Purdue
- Conference: Big 12 Conference
- Record: 8–5 (5–4 Big 12)
- Head coach: Mike Gundy (8th season)
- Offensive coordinator: Todd Monken (2nd season)
- Offensive scheme: Air raid
- Co-defensive coordinators: Bill Young (4th season); Glenn Spencer (2nd season)
- Base defense: 4–3
- Home stadium: Boone Pickens Stadium

2012 Big 12 Conference football standings
	Conf.			Overall
Team	W		L	W		L
No. 12 Kansas State $+	8	–	1	11	–	2
No. 15 Oklahoma +	8	–	1	10	–	3
No. 19 Texas	5	–	4	9	–	4
Oklahoma State	5	–	4	8	–	5
Baylor	4	–	5	8	–	5
TCU	4	–	5	7	–	6
Texas Tech	4	–	5	8	–	5
West Virginia	4	–	5	7	–	6
Iowa State	3	–	6	6	–	7
Kansas	0	–	9	1	–	11
$ – BCS representative as conference champion; + – Conference co-champions; Rankings from AP Poll

The 2012 Oklahoma State Cowboys football team represented Oklahoma State University in the 2012 NCAA Division I FBS football season. The Cowboys were led by eighth-year head coach Mike Gundy and played their home games at Boone Pickens Stadium in Stillwater, Oklahoma. They were a member of the Big 12 Conference. They finished the season 8–5, 5–4 in Big 12 play to finish in a tie for third place. They were invited to the Heart of Dallas Bowl where they defeated Purdue.

== Schedule ==
Date	Time	Opponent	Rank	Site	TV	Result	Attendance
September 1	6:00 p.m.	Savannah State*	No. 19	Boone Pickens Stadium; Stillwater, OK	FCS Central	W 84–0	55,784
September 8	9:30 p.m.	at Arizona*	No. 18	Arizona Stadium; Tucson, AZ	P12N	L 38–59	45,602
September 15	11:00 a.m.	Louisiana–Lafayette*		Boone Pickens Stadium; Stillwater, OK	FSN	W 65–24	56,062
September 29	6:30 p.m.	No. 12 Texas		Boone Pickens Stadium; Stillwater, OK	FOX	L 36–41	56,709
October 13	2:30 p.m.	at Kansas		Memorial Stadium; Lawrence, KS	FSN	W 20–14	31,115
October 20	11:00 a.m.	Iowa State^{†}		Boone Pickens Stadium; Stillwater, OK	FX	W 31–10	57,019
October 27	2:30 p.m.	TCU		Boone Pickens Stadium; Stillwater, OK	FSN	W 36–14	57,183
November 3	7:00 p.m.	at No. 3 Kansas State		Bill Snyder Family Football Stadium; Manhattan, KS	ABC	L 30–44	50,781
November 10	2:30 p.m.	West Virginia		Boone Pickens Stadium; Stillwater, OK	ABC/ESPN2	W 55–34	57,799
November 17	2:30 p.m.	No. 23 Texas Tech		Boone Pickens Stadium; Stillwater, OK	FSN	W 59–21	55,341
November 24	2:30 p.m.	at No. 14 Oklahoma	No. 22	Gaylord Family Oklahoma Memorial Stadium; Norman, OK (Bedlam Game)	ESPN	L 48–51 ^{OT}	85,824
December 1	11:00 a.m.	at Baylor	No. 24	Floyd Casey Stadium; Waco, TX	FX	L 34–41	39,203
January 1, 2013	11:00 a.m.	vs. Purdue*		Cotton Bowl; Dallas, TX (Heart of Dallas Bowl)	ESPNU	W 58–14	48,313
*Non-conference game; ^{†}Homecoming; Rankings from AP Poll released prior to the game; All times are in Central time

== Rankings ==
Ranking movements Legend: ██ Increase in ranking ██ Decrease in ranking — = Not ranked RV = Received votes
	Week															
Poll	Pre	1	2	3	4	5	6	7	8	9	10	11	12	13	14	Final
AP	19	18	RV	RV	RV	—	—	RV	—	RV	RV	RV	22	24	RV	RV
Coaches	19	18	RV	25	22	RV	RV	RV	RV	24	RV	24	21	RV	RV	RV
Harris	Not released						RV	RV	RV	25	RV	RV	22	25	RV	Not released
BCS	Not released							—	—	24	—	24	21	23	—	Not released

== Game summaries ==
=== Savannah State ===
Pregame.com favored Oklahoma State by 67.5 points prior to the match-up with Savannah State, believed to be one of the largest (unofficial) spreads in college football history. True freshman QB Wes Lunt made his first career start in Stillwater, completing 11 of 11 passes for 129 yards. Oklahoma State jumped out to a 35 point lead after the first quarter, leading Coach Gundy to pull the starters at the beginning of the second quarter. J.W. Walsh and Clint Chelf completed the game at QB, going 13 of 21 for 149 yards with 2 TDs and 1 INT and 2 of 5 for 9 yards with 1 TD, respectively. 3 Oklahoma State RBs rushed for over 94 yards, with starting back Joseph Randle leading the way, putting up 107 yards and 2 TDs on 6 carries. Oklahoma State cruised to an 84-0 victory and played so many backup players that one AP photographer had to ask the Oklahoma State press staff who #47 was. The press staff did not know, either.

=== Arizona ===
Oklahoma State entered their second game of the season (at Arizona) ranked No. 18 in the country. Wes Lunt made his second start, going 37 of 60 for 436 yards with 4 TDs and 3 INTs. Lunt's 436 passing yards would be a Big 12 single-game record for a freshman until Patrick Mahomes broke it in 2014 (Alan Bowman would break Mahomes' record in 2018).Joseph Randle (23 carries, 123 yards) and Tracy Moore (8 receptions, 106 yards) were the top statistical RB and WR for the Cowboys. Oklahoma State started strong, going up 14-0 on Arizona, before the Wildcats rattled off 30 unanswered points between the 1st and 3rd quarters. Penalties plagued the away side, with Oklahoma State receiving 15 penalties for a school-record 167 yards. After the game, Mike Gundy criticized his team for making "way too many mistakes" and playing in an "undisciplined" fashion . Gundy's squad rebounded offensively, scoring a respectable 24 points in the second half. But, they could not rally defensively. Arizona poured 29 more points on OSU after their 30 point onslaught, and ultimately won the game 59-38.

=== Louisiana-Lafayette ===
Oklahoma State returned to Boone Pickens Stadium looking to rebound from their disappointing loss to Arizona against The University of Louisiana-Lafayette. Wes Lunt made his third start, but completed only 3 of 4 passes for 23 yards before Louisiana CB Melvin Hunt knocked him out of the game with a left knee injury. Redshirt freshman J.W. Walsh relieved Lunt, and completed 21 of 30 passes for 347 yards with 4 TDs. Joseph Randle, again, led the Oklahoma State backfield with 105 yards and 2 TDs on 21 carries, while Blake Jackson led the receiving corps with 112 yards and 1 TD on 5 receptions. Josh Stewart also impressed as a wide-out, catching 9 passes for 104 yards and 2 TDs. The Cowboys dominated the game, entering halftime up 44-0. Louisiana scored its first TD in the third quarter only when Oklahoma State backup CB Devin Hedgepeth allowed his man to run free after suffering a left leg injury. Oklahoma State won the game 65-24.

=== Texas ===
Oklahoma State stayed in Stillwater to take on the 12th ranked Texas Longhorns. Wes Lunt remained out with a knee injury, giving J.W. Walsh the start at QB. Walsh completed 18 of 27 passes for 301 yards with 2 TDs and 1 INT. Joseph Randle exploded for 208 yards and 2 TDs on 25 carries. Tracy Moore led the Cowboys receiving room with 6 catches and 93 yards. The match-up was closely contested, with Texas leading 21-17 at the half and 28-26 at the start of the fourth quarter. Early in the fourth, Randle finished off a strong Oklahoma State drive with a 2 yard TD, giving the Cowboys a 33-28 lead. Texas quickly responded, needing only 7 rushes to move 65 yards to the Oklahoma State 10-yard-line. Longhorn RB Joe Bergeron capped off that drive with a 1 yard score to retake the lead, 34-33 (Texas unsuccessfully attempted a 2-point conversion). The ensuing Texas kickoff went out of bounds, giving the Cowboys good starting field position. It took them only 3 plays to move to the Texas 13 yard-line, but the drive stalled there, and Gundy's squad settled for a 24 yard field goal from Quinn Sharp to make the score 36-35. The Oklahoma State coaching staff was criticized afterward for pulling Randle out of the game in favor of backup RB Desmond Roland, who rushed for 2 yards twice in a row before Randle was reinserted into the game on the Cowboys' stalled final offensive possession. Gundy admitted that a mistake might have been made, saying, "coaches will have second thoughts about plays that were called ... we have to be able to make those plays". After the Sharp field goal, Texas got the ball back with 2:34 remaining in the game. The Longhorns drove 75 yards in 8 plays, and RB Joe Bergeron dove into the endzone from 2 yards out with 29 seconds remaining to give Texas a 41-36 victory. Bergeron's game-winning play was reviewed after OSU safety Daytawion Lowe appeared to come out of a pile in the endzone with the ball, but the replay officials upheld the initial call of TD.

=== Kansas ===
Next, Oklahoma State traveled to Lawrence to take on the Kansas Jayhawks. Gray skies and a driving rain led to a messy first quarter. Eventually, the game was delayed for 40 minutes by lightning. Although there was speculation that Wes Lunt might return as the starting QB, Gundy stayed with J.W. Walsh, who had performed well in Lunt's absence. Walsh threw for 255 yards on 18/29 passes with 1 TD, 1 INT, and 52 rushing yards on 9 carries. The KU defense largely contained Joseph Randle, limiting him to 86 yards on 29 carries (2.8 YPC). Charlie Moore led the team in receiving with 97 yards and 1 TD on 5 catches. After the storm delay, Oklahoma State took firm control of the game, ultimately leading 20-0 midway through the third quarter. Then, freshman KU backup QB Michael Cummings replaced the starter, Dayne Crist. Cummings led a furious comeback effort, scoring 2 TDs in the first 6 minutes of the fourth quarter. However, the comeback fell short after an incomplete pass on 4th and 5 from the OSU 41 with 2:45 remaining in the game. The KU defense quickly forced 4th down on the subsequent possession, but a roughing-the-kicker penalty on OSU's punt allowed the Cowboys to run out the clock.

=== Iowa State ===
After starting the season 3-2, Oklahoma State looked for a signature Big 12 win over 24th ranked Iowa State at home. J.W. Walsh continued to start at QB and completed 32 of 47 passes for 415 yards and a TD. Walsh also contributed 52 yards on 9 rushes with a rushing TD. The OSU starting QB hurt his knee early in the game, but was able to continue playing. It was determined afterward that Walsh had suffered a season ending knee injury. Joseph Randle rushed 24 times for 156 yards and 2 TDs. Isaiah Anderson and Tracy Moore, Oklahoma State's top 2 receivers, were out with injuries and Charlie Moore caught 8 passes for 129 yards and a TD. Josh Stewart and Blake Jackson also carried heavy receiving loads, catching 13 passes for 89 yards and 4 passes for 96 yards, respectively. The Cyclones looked strong early, driving 75 yards for a TD on their first possession (helped in large part by a 35 yard completion on the game's first play). After the first quarter, ISU led 10-7. However, Oklahoma State seized control of the game in the second quarter, scoring 24 unanswered points over the remainder of the game. The Cowboys ultimately prevailed, 31-10. It was Mike Gundy's 63rd win at Oklahoma State, moving him ahead of Pat Jones and into first place in all-time wins for the program.

=== TCU ===
Due to Walsh's season ending injury, Wes Lunt returned to the starting lineup as Oklahoma State hosted TCU. Lunt completed 18 of 33 passes form 324 yards with 1 TD and 1 INT. Joseph Randle carried most of the offensive load, rushing 32 times for 128 yards and 1 TD, alongside 5 receptions for 37 yards. Josh Stewart caught 6 passes for 120 yards, while Charlie Moore caught the Cowboys' lone receiving TD. TCU was in the midst of a 1-3 slide after suspending starting QB Casey Pachall due to a drunk driving arrest, but the Horned Frogs started strong in Stillwater. Lunt's first pass of the game bounced off the hands of Josh Stewart, falling directly into the hands of TCU safety Elisha Olabode, who returned the INT for a TD. The TCU defense continued to stymie the Cowboys' FBS leading offense, preventing them from gaining a first down for most of the first quarter and stalling 3 first-half drives inside the red zone. TCU led 14-9 at the half. Oklahoma State came alive in the second half, scoring 27 unanswered points, as Wes Lunt and a stout defensive performance (including a scoop-and-score by DT Nigel Nicholas) rallied the team to a 36-14 victory.

=== Kansas State ===
Next, Oklahoma State traveled to Manhattan, Kansas to take on the undefeated Kansas State Wildcats. OSU, on a 3 game win streak, entered the game ranked 24th in the nation while KSU was ranked 2nd. Wes Lunt again started at QB, but struggled, completing just 11 of 20 passes for 184 yards, a TD, and 3 INTs before leaving the game with an injury in the 3rd quarter. Redshirt junior Clint Chelf relieved him, completing 16 of 27 passes for 233 yards with 1 TD and 1 INT. Chelf also rushed 4 times for 33 yards. The Wildcat defense bottled up star RB Joseph Randle, holding him to just 47 yards on 15 carries. Charlie Moore and Josh Stewart led the OSU WRs with 1 TD and 135 yards on 7 receptions and 92 yards on 8 receptions, respectively. Oklahoma State kept it close in the 1st quarter, with the score standing at 7-7 after 15 minutes. But, turnovers, poor special teams, and weak tackling soon plagued the Cowboys. Beginning in the 2nd quarter, the Oklahoma State defense struggled to halt the potent Kansas State offense led by star QB Collin Klein and star WR Tyler Lockett. The Wildcats led 31-17 at the half. Klein left the game with an injury in the 3rd quarter and the Cowboys' defense was able to hold Kansas State to 13 2nd half points. But, the offense only matched that total with 13 points of their own, leading to a 44-30 Kansas State victory.

=== West Virginia ===
Team	1	2	3	4	Total
West Virginia	7	10	17	0	34
• Oklahoma State	21	10	10	14	55

- Date: November 10
- Location: Boone Pickens Stadium, Stillwater, OK
- Game start: 2:30 p.m. CST
- Elapsed time: 3:33
- Game attendance: 57,799
- Referee: Mike Defee
- TV announcers (ABC/ESPN2): Dave LaMont (Play-by-play) & Kelly Stouffer (Color)

Scoring summary
1	12:00	OKST	Josh Stewart 46 yard run (Quinn Sharp kick)	Oklahoma State 7–0
1	3:07	OKST	Josh Stewart 21 yard pass from Clint Chelf (Quinn Sharp kick)	Oklahoma State 14–0
1	1:06	WVU	Stedman Bailey 37 yard pass from Paul Millard (Tyler Bitancurt kick)	Oklahoma State 14–7
1	:53	OKST	Justin Gilbert 96 yard kickoff return	Oklahoma State 21–7
2	5:43	WVU	Tavon Austin 17 yard pass from Geno Smith (Tyler Bitancurt kick)	Oklahoma State 21–14
2	4:33	OKST	Blake Jackson 48 yard pass from Clint Chelf (Quinn Sharp kick)	Oklahoma State 28–14
2	2:38	OKST	Quinn Sharp 26 yard field goal	Oklahoma State 31–14
2	:55	WVU	Tyler Bitancurt 41 yard field goal	Oklahoma State 31–17
3	12:32	WVU	Ryan Nehlen 9 yard pass from Geno Smith (Tyler Bitancurt kick)	Oklahoma State 31–24
3	10:19	OKST	Charlie Moore 5 yard pass from Clint Chelf	Oklahoma State 38–24
3	5:58	WVU	Tyler Bitancurt 37 yard field goal	Oklahoma State 38–27
3	5:20	WVU	Geno Smith 1 yard run (Tyler Bitancurt kick)	Oklahoma State 38–34
3	2:22	OKST	Quinn Sharp 32 yard field goal	Oklahoma State 41–34
4	12:05	OKST	Josh Stewart 20 yard pass from Clint Chelf (Quinn Sharp kick)	Oklahoma State 48–34
4	9:50	OKST	Jeremy Smith 21 yard run (Quinn Sharp kick)	Oklahoma State 55-34

Oklahoma State returned to Stillwater in a match-up against the West Virginia Mountaineers, led by future NFL players, Geno Smith and Tavon Austin. Wes Lunt remained out with a concussion, giving Clint Chelf his first career start. Chelf impressed, tossing 292 yards, 4 TDs, and 1 INT on 22 of 31 passes. Josh Stewart received the bulk of Chelf's attention, catching 13 balls for a career high 172 and 2 TDs. Stewart also scored on a 46 yard rush. Joseph Randle put up another middling performance, rushing 21 times for just 81 yards, although that did push his total rushing yards over 1000 on the season. The game featured offensive runs by both teams. Oklahoma State led 28-7 midway into the 2nd quarter and entered the half up 31-17. But, the Mountaineers rallied, trailing 38-34 with 5:20 left in the 3rd quarter after a 42 yard INT by WVU LB Terrence Gavin set up a TD on a 1 yard QB sneak by Geno Smith. West Virginia would not score again, and a 4th quarter surge by the Cowboys' offense led to a 55-34 Oklahoma State victory.

=== Texas Tech ===
Team	1	2	3	4	Total
Texas Tech	0	14	0	7	21
• Oklahoma State	7	28	17	7	59

- Date: November 17
- Location: Boone Pickens Stadium, Stillwater, OK
- Game start: 2:30 p.m. CST
- Elapsed time: 3:24
- Game attendance: 55,341
- Referee: Randy Christal
- TV announcers (FSN): Ron Thulin (Play-by-play), Brian Baldinger (Color) & Jim Knox (Sideline)

Scoring summary
Q1	10:30	OKST	Staley 2 yard pass from Walsh (Sharp kick)	OKST 7–0
Q2	14:57	TTU	Stephens 1 yard run (Bustin kick)	Tie 7–7
Q2	13:22	OKST	Anderson 60 yard pass from Chelf (Sharp kick)	OKST 14–7
Q2	11:15	OKST	Anderson 33 yard pass from Chelf (Sharp kick)	OKST 21–7
Q2	8:34	OKST	Walsh 2 yard run (Sharp kick)	OKST 28–7
Q2	6:18	OKST	Anderson 66 yard pass from Chelf (Sharp kick)	OKST 35–7
Q2	:15	TTU	Williams 2 yard pass from Doege (Bustin kick)	OKST 35–14
Q3	9:54	OKST	Smith 17 yard run (Sharp kick)	OKST 42–14
Q3	6:22	OKST	Sharp 51 yard field goal	OKST 45–14
Q3	:17	OKST	Randle 1 yard run (Sharp kick)	OKST 52–14
Q4	12:35	OKST	Craig 30 yard blocked punt return (Sharp kick)	OKST 59–14
Q4	2:51	TTU	Moore 7 yard pass from Brewer (Bustin kick)	OKST 59–21

Oklahoma State remained in Stillwater to take on the Texas Tech Red Raiders. After defeating a strong West Virginia squad, Oklahoma State found themselves, once again, ranked 24th in the nation. Texas Tech was ranked 23rd and coached by future US Senator, Tommy Tuberville. Clint Chelf started at QB, completing 11 of 21 passes for 229 yards and 3 TDs while rushing 4 times for 40 yards. J.W. Walsh, who was previously thought to have suffered a season-ending injury against Iowa State, made an early return, being deployed by Gundy in several short-yardage situations. Walsh threw 1 TD pass and ran for another. Joseph Randle rushed 17 times for 93 yards and 1 TD. Isaiah Anderson, who had been expected to serve as WR1 for OSU during training camp, instead dealt with a nagging hand injury throughout the 2012 season that limited his usage and caused him to miss 5 of 13 games. But, Anderson finally broke through against the Red Raiders, hauling in 4 receptions for 174 yards and 3 TDs. The Cowboys dominated all facets of the game, blocking two punts, forcing three turnovers, and scoring 28 unanswered points in the 2nd quarter. Oklahoma State would win the game 59-21. The contest also featured a pregame tribute honoring the 1 year anniversary of a plane crash that claimed the lives of women's basketball coach Kurt Budke, assistant coach Miranda Serna, former Oklahoma State Senator Olin Branstetter (who was piloting the aircraft), and Paula Branstetter (Olin's wife).

=== Oklahoma ===
The 2012 Bedlam Rivalry, played in Norman, Oklahoma, had massive Big 12 and national bowl game implications. Oklahoma entered the game 8-2, ranked 13th in the country, and with a real shot at the Big 12 title. Oklahoma State held a record of 7-3 and was ranked 21st overall. Clint Chelf continued starting at QB for the Cowboys, tossing 253 yards, 1 TD, and 1 INT on 19/37 completions. Backup QB J.W. Walsh got inserted in a single short yardage situation, rushing for 2 yards and a TD. Josh Stewart received the lion's share of Chelf's attentions, hauling in 11 balls for 150 yards and a TD. Joseph Randle emerged as the Cowboys' offensive star against their in-state rival. Randle rushed 21 times for 116 and 4 TDs (tying his career high), while also completing 1 pass for 36 yards on a trick play. The Sooners were led by star QB and future NFL player, Landry Jones. The game was heavily contested and featured each team exchanging streaks of offensive efficiency, though Oklahoma would never actually lead during regulation and needed to wipe out two double-digit deficits to force OT. At the half, they were knotted at 24-24. Oklahoma State led 38-30 heading into the final quarter, but OU return man Jalen Saunders tied the game on an 81 yard punt return on the 2nd play of the 4th. The Cowboys answered with a 77 yard drive capped off by Walsh's 2 yard TD run with 10:41 remaining in the game. After short failed possessions by each team, Oklahoma got the ball back with 6:04 left in the game and down 45-38. Landry Jones, who would end the contest with over 500 passing yards, guided the Sooners on a 16 play drive finished off by a 4 yard TD run from backup QB Blake Bell with 4 seconds left in the game. Bedlam headed to overtime for the first time in series history. Oklahoma State settled for a field goal on their first overtime possession, allowing OU to claim victory after Brennan Clay's 18 yard TD run on the Sooners' second play of OT. Final score: Oklahoma 51-Oklahoma State 48.

=== Baylor ===
After the disappointed end to Bedlam, Oklahoma State (ranked 23rd) looked to bounce back against Baylor in Waco, Texas. Clint Chelf kept his starting role, while J.W. Walsh continued to deploy in strategic situations. Chelf completed 30 of 51 passes for 333 yards, 2 TDs, and 2 INT. Walsh threw 1 pass, a completion for 9 yards, and rushed 6 times for 18 yards with 2 TDs. Joseph Randle continued his strong offensive production, carrying the ball 23 times for 141 yards, but without a score. Josh Stewart also continued his strong production, with 12 receptions for 147 yards and a TD. The Bears entered the game on a hot streak, despite a largely middling season. Baylor had upset #1 Kansas State, 52-24, two weeks prior and rallied from a 14-point deficit against Texas Tech the previous week. Oklahoma State found themselves in an early hole, down 24-3 early in the 2nd quarter. But, the Cowboys rallied, scoring back-to-back TDs to cut the lead to 7. Baylor led 31-17 at the half. Mistakes plagued the away side throughout the game. TE Blake Jackson dropped 2 potential TD passes (leading to FGs), Chelf turned the ball over twice (one leading to a defensive score for Baylor), and the OSU defense struggled to handle explosive plays by the Bears. While the Cowboys won the second half 17-10, it was not enough. They finished their regular season with a disappointing 41-34 loss.

=== Purdue (Heart of Dallas Bowl) ===
After back-to-back losses to finish their regular season, speculation abounded on if Oklahoma State could muster the motivation to take on 6-7 Purdue in the Heart of Dallas Bowl in, of course, Dallas, Texas. After the game, Clint Chelf told media, "some of the seniors, those guys, would like to have been in a better bowl", but continued, "we're a highly motivated group. I think everybody wanted to go out there and prove people wrong, show them we could win a game like this". Chelf served as starting QB, but the two other OSU starters from the 2012 season, J.W. Walsh and Wes Lunt, also saw brief action. Chelf completed 17 of 22 passes for 197 yards and 3 TDs. Walsh was 5/7 for 86 yards and 2 TDs. Finally, the freshman Lunt threw 3 passes, completing 1 for 12 yards. Josh Stewart and Joseph Randle also got opportunities to throw the ball on trick plays, each completing 1 pass for 15 and 1 yard, respectively. Gundy also spread offensive touches throughout his RB and WR rooms. Randle still led the backs with 17 carries for 66 yards, but 2 others rushed over 6 times. Desmond Roland carried the ball 9 times for 51 yards, while Jeremy Smith did 6 times for 40 yards and a TD. Isaiah Anderson led OSU's WRs with 5 catches for 78 yards and a TD. But, 3 other players caught 4+ passes and 4 other WRs caught TD passes. The Cowboy defense also showed up, forcing 5 turnovers (2 INTs, 3 fumbles). Oklahoma State put their foot on the gas in the 1st quarter, and never let up. They led 14-0 after 15 minutes, 28-0 at the half, and 45-0 midway into the 3rd quarter when Purdue finally scored. The game finished in a 58-14 victory for Gundy's squad.

== Personnel ==
=== Coaching staff ===
Name	Position	Seasons at Oklahoma State	Alma mater
Mike Gundy	Head coach	8	Oklahoma State (1990)
Todd Monken	Offensive coordinator/quarterbacks	2	Knox College (1989)
Jemal Singleton	Running backs	2	Air Force (1999)
Kasey Dunn	Wide Receivers	2	Idaho (1992)
Joe Wickline	Offensive Line	8	Florida (1983)
Bill Young	Co-Defensive coordinator/Defensive line	8	Oklahoma State (1968)
Glenn Spencer	Co-Defensive coordinator	5	Georgia Tech (1986)
Jason Jones	Defensive Backs	5	Alabama (2001)
Van Malone	Safeties	0	Texas (1994)
Rob Glass	Strength and Conditioning	17	Oklahoma State (1984)
