= 2013 Heart of Dallas Bowl =

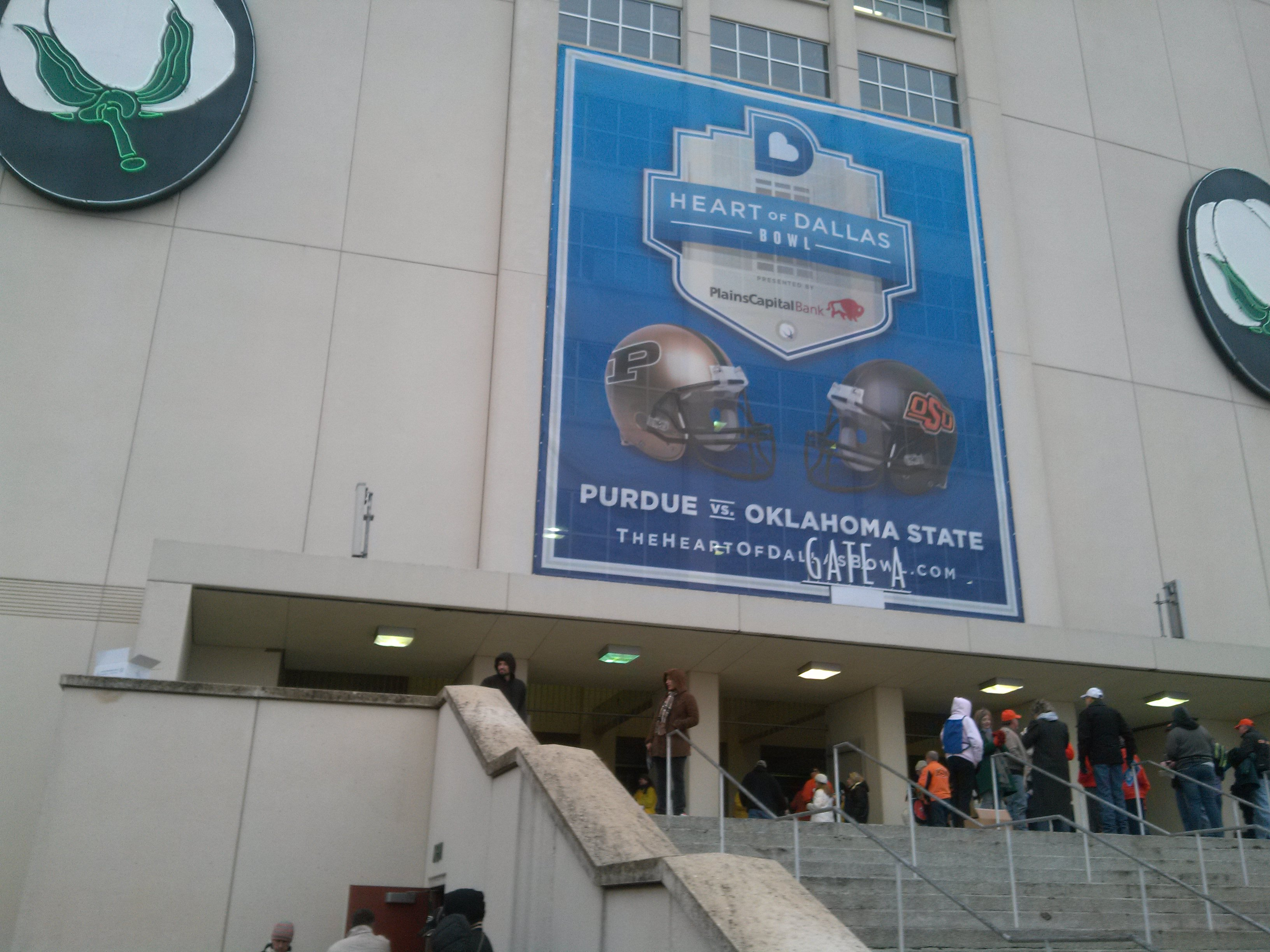
Purdue Boilermakers	Oklahoma State Cowboys
(6–6)	(7–5)
Big Ten	Big 12
14	58
Head coach: Patrick Higgins (interim)	Head coach: Mike Gundy
	1	2	3	4	Total
Purdue	0	0	7	7	14
Oklahoma State	14	14	17	13	58
- Date: January 1, 2013
- Season: 2012
- Stadium: Cotton Bowl
- Location: Dallas, Texas
- MVP: Clint Chelf (QB, Oklahoma State)
- Favorite: Oklahoma State by 16
- Referee: Terry Leyden (Pac-12)
- Attendance: 48,313

United States TV coverage
- Network: ESPNU (TV); Nevada Sports Network (Radio)
- Announcers: Clay Matvick (Play-by-Play), Matt Stinchcomb (Analyst), and Kaylee Hartung (Sidelines)- ESPNU; Alex Shelton (Play-by-Play) and Dave Tester (Analyst)- Nevada Sports Network

The 2013 Heart of Dallas Bowl was played on January 1, 2013, at the Cotton Bowl in Dallas, Texas, as one of the 2012–13 NCAA football bowl games. The game featured a matchup between the Purdue Boilermakers football team and the Oklahoma State Cowboys football team. ESPNU televised the game.

== Game summary ==
=== Scoring ===
Scoring summary

Quarter	Time	Drive			Team	Scoring information	Score	
Quarter	Time	Plays	Yards	TOP	Team	Scoring information	Purdue	Oklahoma State
1	8:02	4	19	1:19	OKST	Charlie Moore 4-yard touchdown reception from Clint Chelf, Quinn Sharp kick good	0	7
1	6:43	3	26	0:25	OKST	Blake Jackson 7-yard touchdown reception from Clint Chelf, Quinn Sharp kick good	0	14
2	14:22	10	81	3:12	OKST	Jeremy Seaton 16-yard touchdown reception from J. W. Walsh, Quinn Sharp kick good	0	21
2	5:12	7	72	2:33	OKST	Jeremy Smith 5-yard touchdown run, Quinn Sharp kick good	0	28
3	14:09	-	-	-	OKST	Fumble forced by Justin Gilbert, recovered by Daytawion Lowe, returned 37 yards for touchdown, Quinn Sharp kick good	0	35
3	7:15	11	72	4:27	OKST	20-yard field goal by Quinn Sharp	0	38
3	4:28	3	55	0:47	OKST	Isaiah Anderson 37-yard touchdown reception from Clint Chelf, Quinn Sharp kick good	0	45
3	0:18	8	75	4:10	PURD	Brandon Cottom 32-yard touchdown reception from Robert Marve, Sam McCartney kick good	7	45
4	11:21	12	69	3:57	OKST	21-yard field goal by Quinn Sharp	7	48
4	8:32	5	61	1:29	OKST	Blake Webb 37-yard touchdown reception from J.W. Walsh, Quinn Sharp kick good	7	55
4	6:18	5	13	1:10	OKST	42-yard field goal by Quinn Sharp	7	58
4	2:52	8	61	3:35	PURD	Tommie Thomas 16-yard touchdown reception from Robert Marve, Sam McCartney kick good	14	58
"TOP" = time of possession. For other American football terms, see Glossary of American football.							14	58
