= 2012 West Virginia Mountaineers football team =

American college football season

2012 West Virginia Mountaineers football

Pinstripe Bowl, L 14–38 vs. Syracuse
- Conference: Big 12 Conference
- Record: 7–6 (4–5 Big 12)
- Head coach: Dana Holgorsen (2nd season)
- Offensive coordinator: Shannon Dawson (1st season)
- Offensive scheme: Air raid
- Defensive coordinator: Joe DeForest (1st season)
- Co-defensive coordinator: Keith Patterson (1st season)
- Base defense: 3–4
- Home stadium: Mountaineer Field at Milan Puskar Stadium

2012 Big 12 Conference football standings
	Conf.			Overall
Team	W		L	W		L
No. 12 Kansas State $+	8	–	1	11	–	2
No. 15 Oklahoma +	8	–	1	10	–	3
No. 19 Texas	5	–	4	9	–	4
Oklahoma State	5	–	4	8	–	5
Baylor	4	–	5	8	–	5
TCU	4	–	5	7	–	6
Texas Tech	4	–	5	8	–	5
West Virginia	4	–	5	7	–	6
Iowa State	3	–	6	6	–	7
Kansas	0	–	9	1	–	11
$ – BCS representative as conference champion; + – Conference co-champions; Rankings from AP Poll

The 2012 West Virginia Mountaineers football team represented West Virginia University in the 2012 NCAA Division I FBS football season. The season marked the Mountaineers' first season as members of the Big 12 Conference. In addition, the 2012 season was the first for the team since 1942 without a Backyard Brawl matchup against their top rival Pittsburgh due to their exit from the Big East Conference after the 2011 season. The Mountaineers were led by Dana Holgorsen in his second season as head coach. Joe DeForest and Keith Patterson served as co-defensive coordinators in their first season at WVU, while Shannon Dawson was elevated to offensive coordinator after serving as the team's receivers coach in the 2011 season. West Virginia played its home games on Mountaineer Field at Milan Puskar Stadium in Morgantown, West Virginia.

West Virginia, entered the 2012 season ranked 11th in AP Poll and were projected to contend with Oklahoma for the Big 12 in their first season in the conference. The Mountaineers won their first five games of the season, which included a shootout win over #25 Baylor on homecoming, and a high-scoring affair with #11 Texas. The Mountaineers who had risen up to #5 in the AP Poll, went on the road to face the Texas Tech, a game which they fell behind 35–7, and would ultimately lose 49–14. The Texas Tech loss was the start of 5–game losing streak, which saw the Mountaineers fall completely out the AP Poll, and out of Big 12 title contention. The Mountaineers recovered and won their final two games, to finish out the regular season with an 7–5 record, 4–5 in Big 12 play to finish in a four-way tie for fourth place. They were invited to the Pinstripe Bowl where they were defeated by longtime rival Syracuse.

== Preseason ==
=== 2012 recruiting class ===
College recruiting (2012)
Name	Hometown	School	Height	Weight	40^{‡}	Commit date
Imarjaye Albury; DT	Miami, FL	Northwestern	6 ft 1 in (1.85 m)	280 lb (130 kg)	–	Mar 10, 2011
Imarjaye Albury; DT	Recruit ratings: Scout: Rivals: (73)					
Christian Brown; DT	Bridgeton, NJ	Bridgeton Senior	6 ft 2 in (1.88 m)	290 lb (130 kg)	–	Dec 16, 2011
Christian Brown; DT	Recruit ratings: Scout: Rivals: (76)					
Roshard Burney; RB	Palm Beach Gardens, FL	Palm Beach Gardens	5 ft 10 in (1.78 m)	205 lb (93 kg)	4.5	Nov 28, 2011
Roshard Burney; RB	Recruit ratings: Scout: Rivals: (75)					
Ford Childress; QB	Houston, TX	Kinkaid	6 ft 4 in (1.93 m)	210 lb (95 kg)	4.8	Apr 19, 2011
Ford Childress; QB	Recruit ratings: Scout: Rivals: (80)					
Torry Clayton; RB	Homestead, FL	South Dade	5 ft 10 in (1.78 m)	190 lb (86 kg)	4.4	Jan 17, 2012
Torry Clayton; RB	Recruit ratings: Scout: Rivals: (76)					
Travares Copeland; ATH	Port St. Lucie, FL	Treasure Coast	5 ft 11 in (1.80 m)	175 lb (79 kg)	–	Feb 1, 2012
Travares Copeland; ATH	Recruit ratings: Scout: Rivals: (77)					
K. J. Dillon; DB	Apopka, FL	Apopka	6 ft 1 in (1.85 m)	185 lb (84 kg)	4.6	Dec 11, 2011
K. J. Dillon; DB	Recruit ratings: Scout: Rivals: (76)					
John DePalma; LS	Cumming, GA	Pinecrest Academy	6 ft 6 in (1.98 m)	235 lb (107 kg)	–	Mar 3, 2012
John DePalma; LS	Recruit ratings: (–)					
Mark Glowinski; OT	Scranton, PA	Lackawanna C.C.	6 ft 5 in (1.96 m)	290 lb (130 kg)	–	Jan 21, 2012
Mark Glowinski; OT	Recruit ratings: Scout: Rivals: (–)					
Jarrod Harper; DB	Frostburg, MD	Mountain Ridge	6 ft 0 in (1.83 m)	200 lb (91 kg)	4.5	Feb 22, 2011
Jarrod Harper; DB	Recruit ratings: Scout: Rivals: (74)					
Korey Harris; DE	Fruit Cove, FL	Bartram Trail	6 ft 4 in (1.93 m)	230 lb (100 kg)	5.3	Jan 19, 2011
Korey Harris; DE	Recruit ratings: Scout: Rivals: (76)					
Garrett Hope; LB	The Woodlands, TX	The Woodlands	6 ft 3 in (1.91 m)	220 lb (100 kg)	4.7	Jan 21, 2012
Garrett Hope; LB	Recruit ratings: Scout: Rivals: (69)					
Will Johnson; TE	Osseo, MN	Osseo	6 ft 7 in (2.01 m)	245 lb (111 kg)	4.8	Dec 15, 2011
Will Johnson; TE	Recruit ratings: Scout: Rivals: (75)					
Karl Joseph; DB	Orlando, FL	Edgewater	5 ft 11 in (1.80 m)	190 lb (86 kg)	–	Dec 15, 2011
Karl Joseph; DB	Recruit ratings: Scout: Rivals: (77)					
Darreal Joyner; WR	Miami, FL	Miami Central	5 ft 11 in (1.80 m)	180 lb (82 kg)	4.4	Aug 1, 2011
Darreal Joyner; WR	Recruit ratings: Scout: Rivals: (76)					
Eric Kinsey; DE	Miami, FL	Northwestern	6 ft 3 in (1.91 m)	240 lb (110 kg)	4.7	Feb 2, 2012
Eric Kinsey; DE	Recruit ratings: Scout: Rivals: (78)					
Nana Kyeremeh; DB	Worthington, OH	Thomas Worthington	5 ft 10 in (1.78 m)	170 lb (77 kg)	4.4	Jan 16, 2012
Nana Kyeremeh; DB	Recruit ratings: Scout: Rivals: (75)					
Josh Lambert; K	Garland, TX	Garland	5 ft 10 in (1.78 m)	180 lb (82 kg)	–	Feb 2, 2012
Josh Lambert; K	Recruit ratings: Scout: Rivals: (–)					
Sam Lebbie; LB	Hyattsville, MD	DeMatha	6 ft 2 in (1.88 m)	240 lb (110 kg)	4.7	Jul 30, 2011
Sam Lebbie; LB	Recruit ratings: Scout: Rivals: (79)					
Devonte Mathis; WR	Miramar, FL	Miramar	6 ft 1 in (1.85 m)	205 lb (93 kg)	4.6	Nov 15, 2011
Devonte Mathis; WR	Recruit ratings: Scout: Rivals: (78)					
Tony Matteo; OL	Akron, OH	Manchester	6 ft 5 in (1.96 m)	275 lb (125 kg)	5.3	Jul 30, 2011
Tony Matteo; OL	Recruit ratings: Scout: Rivals: (–)					
Deontay McManus; WR	Baltimore, MD	Dunbar	6 ft 1 in (1.85 m)	210 lb (95 kg)	4.5	Jun 27, 2011
Deontay McManus; WR	Recruit ratings: Scout: Rivals: (78)					
Brandon Napoleon; ATH	Jersey City, NJ	St. Peter's Prep	6 ft 0 in (1.83 m)	175 lb (79 kg)	4.5	Jun 18, 2011
Brandon Napoleon; ATH	Recruit ratings: Scout: Rivals: (78)					
Noble Nwachukwu; DE	Wylie, TX	Wylie	6 ft 2 in (1.88 m)	240 lb (110 kg)	4.7	Jul 30, 2011
Noble Nwachukwu; DE	Recruit ratings: Scout: Rivals: (78)					
Tyler Orlosky; OL	Lakewood, OH	Lakewood St. Edward	6 ft 4 in (1.93 m)	290 lb (130 kg)	5.1	Jul 30, 2011
Tyler Orlosky; OL	Recruit ratings: Scout: Rivals: (77)					
Adam Pankey; OL	Hamilton, OH	Hamilton	6 ft 5 in (1.96 m)	300 lb (140 kg)	5.1	Feb 1, 2012
Adam Pankey; OL	Recruit ratings: Scout: Rivals: (73)					
Devonte Robinson; WR	Delray Beach, FL	Village Academy	6 ft 2 in (1.88 m)	175 lb (79 kg)	4.5	Jul 13, 2011
Devonte Robinson; WR	Recruit ratings: Scout: Rivals: (78)					
Rick Rumph; DB	Daytona Beach, FL	Mainland	5 ft 11 in (1.80 m)	180 lb (82 kg)	–	Jun 15, 2012
Rick Rumph; DB	Recruit ratings: Rivals: (–)					
Jordan Thompson; WR	Katy, TX	Katy	5 ft 8 in (1.73 m)	160 lb (73 kg)	–	Dec 1, 2011
Jordan Thompson; WR	Recruit ratings: Scout: Rivals: (75)					
Sean Walters; DB	Hallandale Beach, FL	Hallandale	6 ft 1 in (1.85 m)	190 lb (86 kg)	–	Dec 11, 2011
Sean Walters; DB	Recruit ratings: Scout: Rivals: (77)					
Overall recruit ranking: Scout: 26 Rivals: 48
‡ Refers to 40-yard dash; Note: In many cases, Scout, Rivals, 247Sports, On3, and ESPN may conflict in their listings of height, weight and 40 time.; In these cases, the average was taken. ESPN grades are on a 100-point scale.; Sources: "West Virginia 2012 Football Commitments". Rivals.; "2012 West Virginia Commits". Scout.; "2012 Player Commitments – West Virginia". ESPN.; "Scout.com Team Recruiting Rankings". Scout.; "2012 Team Ranking". Rivals.com.

=== Big 12 media poll ===
1. Oklahoma (32), 396
2. West Virginia (7), 339
3. Texas 291
4. Oklahoma State, 267
5. TCU (1), 260
6. Kansas State (1), 257
7. Baylor, 162
8. Iowa State, 121
9. Texas Tech, 116
10. Kansas, 46

=== Awards candidates ===
- Heisman Trophy

Tavon Austin
Geno Smith

- Fred Biletnikoff Award

Tavon Austin
Stedman Bailey

- Walter Camp Award

Tavon Austin
Geno Smith

- Lou Groza Award

Tyler Bitancurt

- Paul Hornung Award

Tavon Austin

- Lombardi Award

Joe Madsen

- Manning Award

Geno Smith

- Maxwell Award

Geno Smith
Tavon Austin

- Davey O'Brien Award

Geno Smith

- Rimington Trophy

Joe Madsen

- Johnny Unitas Award

Geno Smith

== Coaching staff ==
2012 Coaching Staff
Head coach: Dana Holgorsen; Offensive coaches: Bill Bedenbaugh - Offensive line; Shannon Dawson – Offensive coordinator/Receivers; Robert Gillespie - Running backs; Jake Spavital – Quarterbacks; Defensive coaches: Joe DeForest - Defensive coordinator/safeties; Keith Patterson - Co-defensive coordinator/linebackers; Daron Roberts - Cornerbacks; Erik Slaughter - Defensive line	Special teams coaches: Steve Dunlap - Special teams coordinator; Support staff: Ryan Dorchester - Recruiting coordinator; Alex Hammond - Director of Football Operations; Mike Joseph - Strength and Conditioning Coach; Dave Kerns - Head Athletic Trainer; Dan Nehlen - Equipment Manager; Quincy Wilson - Assistant Director of Football Operations

== Roster ==
2012 West Virginia Mountaineers
Quarterbacks: 7 Ford Childress – Freshman (redshirt); 11 Travis Maraney – Freshman; 14 Paul Millard – Sophomore; 16 Logan Moore – Junior; 12 Geno Smith – Senior; Running backs: 20 Shawne Alston – Senior; 28 D'Vontis Arnold – Freshman (redshirt); 13 Andrew Buie – Sophomore; 32 Ryan Clarke – RS Senior; 88 Cody Clay – RS Freshman; 29 Dustin Garrison – Sophomore; 35 Anthony Gutta – RS Freshman; 27 D. J. Hunt – Freshman; 33 Nate Majnaric – RS Junior; 30 Donovan Miles – RS Senior; 36 Chris Smelley – RS Freshman; Receivers: 83 Connor Arlia – Sophomore; 1 Tavon Austin – Senior; 3 Stedman Bailey – RS Junior; 23 Dustin Brown – RS Sophomore; 15 Dante Campbell – RS Freshman; 17 Sam Eggleston – Freshman; 18 Terrence Gourdine – RS Sophomore; 89 Will Johnson – Freshman; 82 Devonte Mathis – Freshman; 5 Ivan McCartney – Junior; 19 K. J. Myers – RS Freshman; 80 Ryan Nehlen – RS Senior; 85 Devonte Robinson – Freshman; 10 Jordan Thompson – Freshman; 81 J. D. Woods – RS Senior	Offensive linemen: 60 John Bassler – RS Senior; 57 Jeff Braun -RS Senior; 63 Michael Calicchio – Junior; 76 Pat Eger – RS Junior; 62 Curtis Feight – RS Junior; 64 Mark Glowinski – Junior; 73 Russell Haughton-James – RS Freshman; 70 Brandon Jackson – RS Freshman; 77 Josh Jenkins – RS Senior; 79 Nick Kindler – RS Junior; 78 Marquis Lucas – RS Freshman; 74 Joe Madsen – RS Senior; 69 Tony Matteo – Freshman; 65 Tyler Orlosky – Freshman; 58 Adam Pankey – Freshman; 67 Quinton Spain – RS Sophomore; Defensive linemen: 94 Imarjaye Albury – Freshman; 95 Christian Brown – Freshman; 98 Will Clarke – RS Junior; 92 Trevor Demko – RS Sophomore; 17 Dozie Ezemma – RS Junior; 70 James Gayeski – RS Freshman; 95 Korey Harris – Freshman; 42 Garrett Hope – Freshman; 45 Eric Kinsey – Freshman; 91 J. B. Lageman – RS Senior; 97 Noble Nwachukwu – Freshman; 93 Kyle Rose – RS Freshman; 90 Shaq Rowell – Senior; 56 Jewone Snow – RS Sophomore; 99 Jorge Wright – RS Senior	Linebackers: 53 Tyler Anderson – RS Junior; 48 Justin Arndt – Freshman; 33 Jared Barber – Sophomore; 31 Isaiah Bruce – RS Freshman; 40 Austin Copeland – Freshman; 4 Josh Francis – Senior; 28 Terence Garvin – Senior; 49 Troy Gloster – RS Sophomore; 35 Nick Kwiatkoski – RS Freshman; 36 Shaq Petteway – Sophomore; 50 Taige Redman – RS Junior; 47 Doug Rigg – Junior; 41 Curtis Smelley – RS Freshman; 37 Wes Tonkery – RS Sophomore; 11 Sean Walters – Freshman; Cornerbacks: 16 Terrell Chestnut – RS Freshman; 3 Vernon Davis – Freshman (redshirt); 23 Brodrick Jenkins – RS Junior; 7 Nana Kyeremeh – Freshman; 24 Cecil Level – RS Senior; 12 Mikal Mayo – RS Freshman; 6 Pat Miller – Junior; 20 Brandon Napoleon – Freshman (redshirt); 15 Ricky Rumph – Freshman; 14 Nana Twum Agyire – RS Freshman; 19 Anthony Vecchio – RS Sophomore; 22 Avery Williams – Sophomore	Safeties: 34 Ishmael Banks – RS Sophomore; 26 Travis Bell – Junior; 39 Nick Cadwell – RS Senior; 25 Darwin Cook – RS Junior; 9 K. J. Dillon – Freshman; 32 Mike Hall – Freshman; 43 Jarrod Harper – Freshman; 8 Karl Joseph – Freshman; 27 William Marable – RS Junior; 46 Matt Moro – Senior; 18 Ishmail Showell – RS Freshman; Specialists: 40 Tyler Bitancurt – RS Senior (K); 69 Jerry Cooper – RS Sophomore (LS); 87 John DePalma – Freshman (LS); 38 Josh Lambert – Freshman (K/P); 46 Michael Molinari – RS Sophomore (K); 44 Corey Smith – RS Senior (K/P); Key: – Currently Injured; (redshirt) – Current redshirt; I* – Ineligible; Official Team Roster

== Schedule ==
Date	Time	Opponent	Rank	Site	TV	Result	Attendance
September 1	12:00 p.m.	Marshall*	No. 11	Mountaineer Field; Morgantown, WV (Friends of Coal Bowl)	FX	W 69–34	59,120
September 15	4:30 p.m.	vs. No. 4 (FCS) James Madison*	No. 9	FedExField; Landover, MD	ROOT	W 42–12	45,511
September 22	12:00 p.m.	Maryland*	No. 8	Mountaineer Field; Morgantown, WV (rivalry)	FX	W 31–21	58,504
September 29	12:00 p.m.	No. 25 Baylor^{†}	No. 9	Mountaineer Field; Morgantown, WV (Stripe the Stadium)	FX	W 70–63	60,012
October 6	7:00 p.m.	at No. 11 Texas	No. 8	Darrell K Royal–Texas Memorial Stadium; Austin, TX	FOX	W 48–45	101,851
October 13	3:30 p.m.	at Texas Tech	No. 5	Jones AT&T Stadium; Lubbock, TX	ABC	L 14–49	57,328
October 20	7:00 p.m.	No. 4 Kansas State	No. 13	Mountaineer Field; Morgantown, WV	FOX	L 14–55	60,101
November 3	3:00 p.m.	TCU	No. 21	Mountaineer Field; Morgantown, WV	FOX	L 38–39 ^{2OT}	52,322
November 10	3:30 p.m.	at Oklahoma State		Boone Pickens Stadium; Stillwater, OK	ABC	L 34–55	57,799
November 17	7:00 p.m.	No. 12 Oklahoma		Mountaineer Field; Morgantown, WV (Gold Rush)	FOX	L 49–50	50,238
November 23	3:30 p.m.	at Iowa State		Jack Trice Stadium; Ames, IA	ABC	W 31–24	53,792
December 1	2:30 p.m.	Kansas		Mountaineer Field; Morgantown, WV	FSN	W 59–10	51,112
December 29	3:15 p.m.	vs. Syracuse*		Yankee Stadium; Bronx, NY (Pinstripe Bowl, rivalry)	ESPN	L 14–38	39,098
*Non-conference game; ^{†}Homecoming; Rankings from AP Poll and BCS Standings after October 14 released prior to game; All times are in Eastern time

== Rankings ==
Ranking movements Legend: ██ Increase in ranking ██ Decrease in ranking — = Not ranked RV = Received votes
	Week															
Poll	Pre	1	2	3	4	5	6	7	8	9	10	11	12	13	14	Final
AP	11	9	9	8	9	8	5	17	25	23	—	—	—	—	RV	—
Coaches	11	8	8	7	7	7	4	15	22	19	RV	—	—	—	—	—
Harris	Not released						4	15	22	20	RV	—	—	—	RV	Not released
BCS	Not released							13	19	21	—	—	—	—	—	Not released

== Game summaries ==
=== Marshall ===
	1	2	3	4	Total
Thundering Herd	0	10	10	14	34
No. 11 Mountaineers	13	21	21	14	69

Statistics	MRSH	WVU
First downs	28	31
Total yards	545	655
Rushing yards	132	331
Passing yards	413	324
Turnovers	2	1
Time of possession	32:19	27:41

Team	Category	Player	Statistics
Marshall	Passing	Rakeem Cato	38/54, 413 yards, 2 TD, INT
Marshall	Rushing	Kevin Grooms	5 rushes, 43 yards
Marshall	Receiving	Aaron Dobson	4 receptions, 72 yards
West Virginia	Passing	Geno Smith	32/36, 323 yards, 4 TD
West Virginia	Rushing	Shawne Alston	16 rushes, 123 yards, 2 TD
West Virginia	Receiving	Stedman Bailey	9 receptions, 104 yards, 2 TD

=== Vs. No. 4 (FCS) James Madison ===
	1	2	3	4	Total
No. 4 (FCS) Dukes	0	3	2	7	12
No. 9 Mountaineers	21	7	7	7	42

Statistics	JMU	WVU
First downs	15	28
Total yards	300	569
Rushing yards	188	121
Passing yards	112	448
Turnovers	1	0
Time of possession	35:31	24:19

Team	Category	Player	Statistics
James Madison	Passing	Justin Thorpe	6/13, 71 yards, INT
James Madison	Rushing	Jordan Anderson	17 rushes, 75 yards
James Madison	Receiving	Brian Barlow	2 receptions, 46 yards
West Virginia	Passing	Geno Smith	34/39, 411 yards, 5 TD
West Virginia	Rushing	Shawne Alston	14 rushes, 62 yards, TD
West Virginia	Receiving	Stedman Bailey	13 receptions, 173 yards, 3 TD

=== Maryland ===
	1	2	3	4	Total
Terrapins	7	7	0	7	21
No. 8 Mountaineers	14	10	0	7	31

Statistics	MD	WVU
First downs	18	19
Total yards	351	363
Rushing yards	46	25
Passing yards	305	338
Turnovers	3	0
Time of possession	30:44	29:16

Team	Category	Player	Statistics
Maryland	Passing	Perry Hills	20/29, 305 yards, 3 TD, INT
Maryland	Rushing	Brandon Ross	20 rushes, 52 yards
Maryland	Receiving	Stefon Diggs	3 receptions, 113 yards, 2 TD
West Virginia	Passing	Geno Smith	30/43, 338 yards, 3 TD
West Virginia	Rushing	Andrew Buie	14 rushes, 33 yards
West Virginia	Receiving	Tavon Austin	13 receptions, 179 yards, 3 TD

=== No. 25 Baylor ===
	1	2	3	4	Total
No. 25 Bears	14	21	7	21	63
No. 9 Mountaineers	14	21	21	14	70

Statistics	BAY	WVU
First downs	34	33
Total yards	700	807
Rushing yards	119	151
Passing yards	581	656
Turnovers	1	0
Time of possession	26:05	33:55

Team	Category	Player	Statistics
Baylor	Passing	Nick Florence	29/47, 581 yards, 5 TD, INT
Baylor	Rushing	Jarred Salubi	20 rushes, 75 yards, TD
Baylor	Receiving	Terrance Williams	17 receptions, 314 yards, 2 TD
West Virginia	Passing	Geno Smith	45/51, 656 yards, 8 TD
West Virginia	Rushing	Andrew Buie	25 rushes, 82 yards, 2 TD
West Virginia	Receiving	Stedman Bailey	13 receptions, 303 yards, 5 TD

=== At No. 11 Texas ===
	1	2	3	4	Total
No. 8 Mountaineers	14	13	7	14	48
No. 11 Longhorns	7	21	10	7	45

Statistics	WVU	TEX
First downs	26	21
Total yards	460	404
Rushing yards	192	135
Passing yards	268	269
Turnovers	2	1
Time of possession	29:14	30:46

Team	Category	Player	Statistics
West Virginia	Passing	Geno Smith	25/35, 268 yards, 4 TD
West Virginia	Rushing	Andrew Buie	31 rushes, 207 yards, 2 TD
West Virginia	Receiving	Tavon Austin	10 receptions, 102 yards, TD
Texas	Passing	David Ash	22/29, 269 yards, TD
Texas	Rushing	Johnathan Gray	14 rushes, 87 yards
Texas	Receiving	Jeremy Hills	6 receptions, 67 yards

=== At Texas Tech ===
	1	2	3	4	Total
No. 5 Mountaineers	7	0	0	7	14
Red Raiders	14	21	7	7	49

Statistics	WVU	TTU
First downs	25	30
Total yards	408	676
Rushing yards	130	168
Passing yards	278	508
Turnovers	0	2
Time of possession	30:18	29:42

Team	Category	Player	Statistics
West Virginia	Passing	Geno Smith	29/55, 275 yards, TD
West Virginia	Rushing	Andrew Buie	21 rushes, 71 yards
West Virginia	Receiving	Tavon Austin	9 receptions, 99 yards
Texas Tech	Passing	Seth Doege	32/42, 499 yards, 6 TD, INT
Texas Tech	Rushing	Sadale Foster	10 rushes, 82 yards, TD
Texas Tech	Receiving	Jace Amaro	5 receptions, 156 yards, TD

=== No. 4 Kansas State ===
	1	2	3	4	Total
No. 4 Wildcats	10	21	21	3	55
No. 17 Mountaineers	0	7	0	7	14

Statistics	KSU	WVU
First downs	24	18
Total yards	479	243
Rushing yards	146	88
Passing yards	333	155
Turnovers	0	2
Time of possession	33:08	26:52

Team	Category	Player	Statistics
Kansas State	Passing	Collin Klein	19/21, 323 yards, 3 TD
Kansas State	Rushing	John Hubert	16 rushes, 52 yards
Kansas State	Receiving	Tyler Lockett	9 receptions, 194 yards, 2 TD
West Virginia	Passing	Geno Smith	21/32, 143 yards, TD, 2 INT
West Virginia	Rushing	Dustin Garrison	9 rushes, 54 yards
West Virginia	Receiving	Tavon Austin	6 receptions, 34 yards, TD

=== TCU ===
	1	2	3	4	OT	2OT	Total
Horned Frogs	7	7	7	10	0	8	39
No. 23 Mountaineers	0	21	3	7	0	7	38

Statistics	TCU	WVU
First downs	17	21
Total yards	405	338
Rushing yards	126	78
Passing yards	279	260
Turnovers	3	2
Time of possession	33:18	26:42

Team	Category	Player	Statistics
TCU	Passing	Trevone Boykin	12/29, 254 yards, 2 TD, INT
TCU	Rushing	B. J. Catalon	15 rushes, 39 yards
TCU	Receiving	Josh Boyce	6 receptions, 180 yards, 2 TD
West Virginia	Passing	Geno Smith	32/54, 260 yards, 3 TD, INT
West Virginia	Rushing	Andrew Buie	10 rushes, 40 yards
West Virginia	Receiving	Tavon Austin	11 receptions, 101 yards, TD

=== At Oklahoma State ===
	1	2	3	4	Total
Mountaineers	7	10	17	0	34
Cowboys	21	10	10	14	55

Statistics	WVU	OKST
First downs	26	21
Total yards	479	443
Rushing yards	78	151
Passing yards	401	292
Turnovers	2	1
Time of possession	33:10	26:50

Team	Category	Player	Statistics
West Virginia	Passing	Geno Smith	36/54, 364 yards, 2 TD
West Virginia	Rushing	Andrew Buie	15 rushes, 53 yards
West Virginia	Receiving	Stedman Bailey	14 receptions, 225 yards, TD
Oklahoma State	Passing	Clint Chelf	22/31, 292 yards, 4 TD, INT
Oklahoma State	Rushing	Joseph Randle	21 rushes, 74 yards
Oklahoma State	Receiving	Josh Stewart	13 receptions, 172 yards, 2 TD

=== No. 13 Oklahoma ===
	1	2	3	4	Total
No. 13 Sooners	10	21	7	12	50
Mountaineers	3	14	13	19	49

Statistics	OKLA	WVU
First downs	30	31
Total yards	662	778
Rushing yards	108	458
Passing yards	554	320
Turnovers	2	2
Time of possession	32:14	27:46

Team	Category	Player	Statistics
Oklahoma	Passing	Landry Jones	38/51, 554 yards, 6 TD, INT
Oklahoma	Rushing	Damien Williams	22 rushes, 92 yards, TD
Oklahoma	Receiving	Jalen Saunders	7 receptions, 123 yards, TD
West Virginia	Passing	Geno Smith	20/35, 320 yards, 4 TD, 2 INT
West Virginia	Rushing	Tavon Austin	21 rushes, 344 yards, 2 TD
West Virginia	Receiving	Stedman Bailey	13 receptions, 205 yards, 4 TD

=== At Iowa State ===
	1	2	3	4	Total
Mountaineers	3	14	3	11	31
Cyclones	0	14	7	3	24

Statistics	WVU	ISU
First downs	24	24
Total yards	475	396
Rushing yards	239	234
Passing yards	236	162
Turnovers	0	1
Time of possession	32:07	27:53

Team	Category	Player	Statistics
West Virginia	Passing	Geno Smith	22/31, 236 yards, 2 TD
West Virginia	Rushing	Shawne Alston	19 rushes, 130 yards, TD
West Virginia	Receiving	Tavon Austin	6 receptions, 99 yards, TD
Iowa State	Passing	Sam B. Richardson	13/31, 162 yards, 3 TD
Iowa State	Rushing	Sam B. Richardson	18 rushes, 119 yards
Iowa State	Receiving	Josh Lenz	4 receptions, 48 yards, TD

=== Kansas ===
	1	2	3	4	Total
Jayhawks	0	7	0	3	10
Mountaineers	14	21	17	7	59

Statistics	KU	WVU
First downs	13	32
Total yards	274	647
Rushing yards	157	240
Passing yards	117	407
Turnovers	1	1
Time of possession	30:45	29:15

Team	Category	Player	Statistics
Kansas	Passing	Michael Cummings	6/11, 76 yards
Kansas	Rushing	James Sims	18 rushes, 57 yards, TD
Kansas	Receiving	Tony Pierson	1 reception, 42 yards
West Virginia	Passing	Geno Smith	23/24, 407 yards, 3 TD, INT
West Virginia	Rushing	Andrew Buie	12 rushes, 100 yards, TD
West Virginia	Receiving	Stedman Bailey	11 receptions, 159 yards, 2 TD

=== Vs. Syracuse (Pinstripe Bowl) ===
	1	2	3	4	Total
Mountaineers	0	7	7	0	14
Orange	3	9	23	3	38

Statistics	WVU	SYR
First downs	16	28
Total yards	304	507
Rushing yards	103	369
Passing yards	201	138
Turnovers	1	2
Time of possession	23:37	36:23

Team	Category	Player	Statistics
West Virginia	Passing	Geno Smith	19/28, 202 yards, 2 TD
West Virginia	Rushing	Tavon Austin	11 rushes, 45 yards
West Virginia	Receiving	Stedman Bailey	8 receptions, 121 yards, 2 TD
Syracuse	Passing	Ryan Nassib	11/23, 130 yards, 2 TD, INT
Syracuse	Rushing	Tyson Gulley	26 rushes, 213 yards, 2 TD
Syracuse	Receiving	Tyson Gulley	5 receptions, 56 yards, TD
