= 2012 Baylor Bears football team =

American college football season

2012 Baylor Bears football

Holiday Bowl champion

Holiday Bowl, W 49–26 vs. UCLA
- Conference: Big 12 Conference
- Record: 8–5 (4–5 Big 12)
- Head coach: Art Briles (5th season)
- Co-offensive coordinators: Randy Clements (5th season); Philip Montgomery (5th season)
- Offensive scheme: Veer and shoot
- Defensive coordinator: Phil Bennett (2nd season)
- Base defense: 4–3
- Home stadium: Floyd Casey Stadium

2012 Big 12 Conference football standings
	Conf.			Overall
Team	W		L	W		L
No. 12 Kansas State $+	8	–	1	11	–	2
No. 15 Oklahoma +	8	–	1	10	–	3
No. 19 Texas	5	–	4	9	–	4
Oklahoma State	5	–	4	8	–	5
Baylor	4	–	5	8	–	5
TCU	4	–	5	7	–	6
Texas Tech	4	–	5	8	–	5
West Virginia	4	–	5	7	–	6
Iowa State	3	–	6	6	–	7
Kansas	0	–	9	1	–	11
$ – BCS representative as conference champion; + – Conference co-champions; Rankings from AP Poll

The 2012 Baylor Bears football team represented Baylor University in the 2012 NCAA Division I FBS football season. The team was coached by Art Briles and played its home games at Floyd Casey Stadium in Waco, Texas. The Bears were members of the Big 12 Conference. The conference slate began with a trip to Morgantown, West Virginia to take on the West Virginia Mountaineers, and concluded at home against the Oklahoma State Cowboys. On December 2, Baylor accepted a berth in the 2012 Holiday Bowl to face #17 UCLA, where they defeated the Bruins, 49–26, on December 27.

== Schedule ==
Date	Time	Opponent	Rank	Site	TV	Result	Attendance
September 2	5:30 p.m.	SMU*		Floyd Casey Stadium; Waco, Texas	FSN	W 59–24	43,514
September 15	6:00 p.m.	No. 2 (FCS) Sam Houston State*		Floyd Casey Stadium; Waco, Texas	FCS Central	W 48–23	44,856
September 21	7:00 p.m.	at Louisiana–Monroe*		Malone Stadium; Monroe, Louisiana	ESPN	W 47–42	31,175
September 29	11:00 a.m.	at No. 9 West Virginia	No. 25	Mountaineer Field; Morgantown, West Virginia	FX	L 63–70	60,012
October 13	6:00 p.m.	TCU		Floyd Casey Stadium; Waco, Texas (rivalry)	FSN	L 21–49	42,524
October 20	7:00 p.m.	at No. 25 Texas		Darrell K Royal–Texas Memorial Stadium; Austin, Texas (rivalry)	ABC	L 50–56	101,353
October 27	6:00 p.m.	at Iowa State		Jack Trice Stadium; Ames, IA	FSN	L 21–35	54,877
November 3	2:30 p.m.	Kansas		Floyd Casey Stadium; Waco, Texas	FSN	W 41–14	39,039
November 10	2:30 p.m.	at No. 12 Oklahoma		Gaylord Family Oklahoma Memorial Stadium; Norman, Oklahoma	FSN	L 34–42	84,945
November 17	7:00 p.m.	No. 2 Kansas State		Floyd Casey Stadium; Waco, Texas	ESPN	W 52–24	38,029
November 24	1:30 p.m.	vs. Texas Tech		Cowboys Stadium; Arlington, Texas (Texas Farm Bureau Insurance Shootout)	FOX	W 52–45 ^{OT}	44,168
December 1	11:00 a.m.	No. 23 Oklahoma State		Floyd Casey Stadium; Waco, Texas	FX	W 41–34	39,203
December 27	8:45 p.m.	vs. No. 17 UCLA*		Qualcomm Stadium; San Diego (Holiday Bowl)	ESPN	W 49–26	55,507
*Non-conference game; Rankings from AP Poll/Bowl Championship Series rank (when available); All times are in Central time

== Rankings ==
Ranking movements Legend: ██ Increase in ranking ██ Decrease in ranking — = Not ranked RV = Received votes
	Week															
Poll	Pre	1	2	3	4	5	6	7	8	9	10	11	12	13	14	Final
AP	RV	RV	RV	RV	25	RV	RV	—	—	—	—	—	RV	—	RV	RV
Coaches	RV	RV	RV	RV	24	RV	RV	—	—	—	—	—	—	RV	—	RV
Harris	Not released						RV	—	—	—	—	—	RV	RV	RV	Not released
BCS	Not released							—	—	—	—	—	—	—	—	Not released

== Game summaries ==
=== SMU ===
SMU at Baylor

Team	1	2	3	4	Total
Mustangs	0	3	7	14	24
• Bears	14	10	21	14	59

- Date: September 2
- Location: Floyd Casey Stadium
  Waco, Texas
- Game start: 5:35 p.m. CDT
- Elapsed time: 3:45
- Game attendance: 43,514
- Game weather: 100 °F (38 °C), Sunny & Very Hot, winds S at 12mph
- Referee: Tom Walker
- TV announcers (FSN): Joel Meyers (Play-by-play), Brian Baldinger (Color) & Jim Knox (Sideline)

Baylor came into the game 71–35–4 in season openers; in the series history between Baylor and SMU, SMU held a slim lead at 36–35–7, including an 18–17–3 record in Waco. The Bears struck first, going ahead 14–0 in the first quarter on touchdown passes from quarterback Nick Florence to wide receiver Lanear Sampson and tight end Jordan Najvar. In the second quarter, SMU scored a field goal to make the score 14–3. In a subsequent drive, the Mustangs advanced to the Baylor 9-yard-line before a tipped Garrett Gilbert pass was intercepted. Baylor scored a touchdown on the ensuing 75-yard, 39 second, three play drive to increase its lead to 21–3. That touchdown represented the first of 31 unanswered Baylor points in the second and third quarters, leaving Baylor with a commanding lead of 45–3 before SMU scored a touchdown with 1:58 remaining in the 3rd quarter. Both teams would tack on a pair of touchdowns in the fourth quarter, with both teams' last touchdowns coming on passes from their backup quarterbacks (Baylor's Brice Petty and SMU's Conner Preston). The Bears' 59–24 win was their 7th consecutive win since the team's loss to Oklahoma State (October 29, 2011), and the fifth consecutive game that the Baylor offense scored 40 points or more.

Scoring summary

Quarter	Time	Drive			Team	Scoring information	Score	
Quarter	Time	Plays	Yards	TOP	Team	Scoring information	SMU	Baylor
1	11:18	10	75	3:42	Baylor	Lanear Sampson 6-yard touchdown reception from Nick Florence, Aaron Jones kick good	0	7
1	6:27	7	74	1:40	Baylor	Jordan Najvar 5-yard touchdown reception from Nick Florence, Aaron Jones kick good	0	14
2	12:52	16	66	6:16	SMU	22-yard field goal by Chase Hover	3	14
2	2:02	3	75	0:39	Baylor	Tevin Reese 50-yard touchdown reception from Nick Florence, Aaron Jones kick good	3	21
2	0:00	16	50	0:59	Baylor	44-yard field goal by Aaron Jones	3	24
3	10:22				Baylor	Fumble recovery returned 66 yards for touchdown by Bayl Mike Hicks, Aaron Jones kick good	3	31
3	6:11	9	60	1:59	Baylor	Jarred Salubi 9-yard touchdown run, Aaron Jones kick good	3	38
3	2:39	2	74	0:33	Baylor	Lanear Sampson 36-yard touchdown reception from Nick Florence, Aaron Jones kick good	3	45
3	1:58	2	75	0:41	SMU	Der'rikk Thompson 42-yard touchdown reception from Garrett Gilbert, Chase Hover kick good	10	45
4	11:34	6	25	2:06	Baylor	Glasco Martin 1-yard touchdown run, Aaron Jones kick good	10	52
4	4:49	16	73	6:45	SMU	Jeremy Johnson 4-yard touchdown reception from Garrett Gilbert, Chase Hover kick good	17	52
4	4:00	4	75	0:49	Baylor	Darryl Stonum 37-yard touchdown reception from Bryce Petty, Kolton Lye kick good	17	59
4	2:25	4	72	1:35	SMU	Gehrig Dieter 40-yard touchdown reception from Conner Preston, Chase Hover kick good	24	59
"TOP" = time of possession. For other American football terms, see Glossary of American football.							24	59

=== Sam Houston State ===
#2 Sam Houston State at Baylor

Team	1	2	3	4	Total
#2 Bearkats	3	17	0	3	23
• Bears	3	7	14	24	48

- Date: September 15
- Location: Floyd Casey Stadium
  Waco, Texas
- Game start: 6:05 p.m. CDT
- Elapsed time: 3:51
- Game attendance: 44,856
- Game weather: 79 °F (26 °C), Cloudy Skies, winds W at 6mph
- Referee: Mike Defee
- TV announcers (FCS Central): Steve Physioc (Play-by-play), Gary Reasons (Color) & Emily Jones (Sideline)

The Bears and Bearkats met each other for the fourth time in school history. All four games have been in Waco. Baylor owned a 3–0 advantage. SHSU was led by quarterback Brian Bell, the younger brother of former Baylor quarterback Shawn Bell (2003–2006). The teams traded field goals in a low-scoring first quarter, and SHSU dominated the second quarter, taking a 20–10 lead into the half. Baylor, however, dominated the second half, outscoring the Bearkats 38–3, with Florence chalking up two touchdown passes and running backs Glasco Martin IV and Lache Seastrunk adding touchdown runs of 5 and 15 yards, respectively. Darius Jones provided the Bears' final touchdown, returning an interception 73 yards to seal a 48–23 Baylor victory.

Scoring summary

Quarter	Time	Drive			Team	Scoring information	Score	
Quarter	Time	Plays	Yards	TOP	Team	Scoring information	Sam Houston State	Baylor
1	13:00	8	60	2:00	Baylor	30-yard field goal by Aaron Jones	0	3
1	5:02	9	39	3:26	Sam Houston State	31-yard field goal by Miguel Antonio	3	3
2	14:01	10	74	3:04	Sam Houston State	23-yard field goal by Miguel Antonio	6	3
2	12:52	5	77	1:09	Baylor	Terrance Williams 22-yard touchdown reception from Nick Florence, Aaron Jones kick good	6	10
2	10:00	7	75	2:52	Sam Houston State	Brian Bell 1-yard touchdown run, Miguel Antonio kick good	13	10
2	1:30	12	76	6:07	Sam Houston State	Tim Flanders 26-yard touchdown reception from Brian Bell, Miguel Antonio kick good	20	10
3	14:10	1	9	0:05	Baylor	Jordan Najvar 9-yard touchdown reception from Nick Florence, Miguel Antonio kick good	20	17
3	6:17	11	66	3:13	Baylor	Terrance Williams 18-yard touchdown reception from Nick Florence, Miguel Antonio kick good	20	24
4	11:17	7	27	2:41	Sam Houston State	28-yard field goal by Miguel Antonio	23	24
4	10:33	3	75	0:44	Baylor	Glasco Martin 5-yard touchdown run, Aaron Jones kick good	23	31
4	8:48	4	3	1:25	Baylor	26-yard field goal by Aaron Jones	23	34
4	2:10	1	15	0:05	Baylor	Lache Seastrunk 15-yard touchdown run, Aaron Jones kick good	23	41
4	00:12				Baylor	Interception returned 73 yards for touchdown by Darius Jones, Aaron Jones kick good	23	48
"TOP" = time of possession. For other American football terms, see Glossary of American football.							23	48

=== Louisiana–Monroe ===
Baylor at Louisiana–Monroe

Team	1	2	3	4	Total
• Bears	0	24	10	13	47
Warhawks	14	7	7	14	42

- Date: September 21
- Location: Malone Stadium
  Monroe, Louisiana
- Game start: 7:01 p.m. CDT
- Elapsed time: 3:45
- Game attendance: 31,175 (Stadium Record for ULM)
- Game weather: 81 °F (27 °C), Clear, winds Calm
- Referee: Greg Burks
- TV announcers (ESPN): Carter Blackburn (Play-by-play), Rod Gilmore (Color) & Jemele Hill (Sideline)

The Bears and the Warhawks had never met prior to this Friday night game in the fourth week of the 2012 season. In the preceding two weeks, the Warhawks had stunned the college football world by defeating then #8 Arkansas 34–31 in overtime and taking Auburn to overtime in a 31–28 loss at Auburn. With excitement surrounding the Louisiana-Monroe program at an all-time high, the Bears traveled to Monroe to face the Warhawks in their home opener before a Malone Stadium-record crowd of 31,175. ULM struck first, capitalizing on two interceptions to take a 14–0 lead in the 1st quarter. Baylor outscored the Warhawks 34–14 in the next two quarters, and took a 34–28 lead into the fourth with ULM driving. The Warhawks would score on their drive spanning the third and fourth quarters to go ahead 35–34, but the Bears would answer with a 14-play, 73-yard drive of their own to go ahead 40–35 (a two-point conversion attempt failed). Baylor subsequently forced a fumble and drove down the field for another touchdown to make the score 47–35. ULM, fighting to the end, struck back to score a touchdown and pull within 5 points of Baylor; however, with only 6 seconds remaining, the subsequent onside kick was recovered by the Bears. The victory represented Baylor's ninth consecutive win, which at the time was the second-longest winning streak in the nation behind TCU. The game also represented the Bears' seventh consecutive game in which they scored more than 40 points.

Scoring summary

Quarter	Time	Drive			Team	Scoring information	Score	
Quarter	Time	Plays	Yards	TOP	Team	Scoring information	Baylor	Louisiana-Monroe
1	7:43	4	44	1:11	Louisiana-Monroe	Tevarese Maye 22-yard touchdown reception from Kolton Browning, Justin Manton kick good	0	7
1	1:33	7	76	2:46	Louisiana-Monroe	Monterrell Washington 9-yard touchdown run, Justin Manton kick good	0	14
2	14:22	7	75	2:11	Baylor	Tevin Reese 22-yard touchdown reception from Nick Florence, Aaron Jones kick good	7	14
2	12:00	5	75	2:22	Louisiana-Monroe	Monterrell Washington 48-yard touchdown run, Justin Manton kick good	7	21
2	7:51	11	68	4:09	Baylor	Glasco Martin 1-yard touchdown run, Aaron Jones kick good	14	21
2	5:25	1	48	0:07	Baylor	Tevin Reese 48-yard touchdown reception from Nick Florence, Aaron Jones kick good	21	21
2	0:00	12	51	1:55	Baylor	34-yard field goal by Aaron Jones	24	21
3	13:10	5	75	1:50	Louisiana-Monroe	Jyrus Edwards 58-yard touchdown run, Justin Manton kick good	24	28
3	8:13	4	68	1:13	Baylor	Tevin Reese 46-yard touchdown reception from Nick Florence, Aaron Jones kick good	31	28
3	1:48	11	25	3:53	Baylor	21-yard field goal by Aaron Jones	34	28
4	10:54	15	75	5:54	Louisiana-Monroe	Kolton Browning 1-yard touchdown run, Justin Manton kick good	34	35
4	7:10	14	73	3:44	Baylor	Levi Norwood 9-yard touchdown run, 2-point run by Nick Florence fumbled failed	40	35
4	2:25	8	62	3:15	Baylor	Terrance Williams 22-yard touchdown reception from Nick Florence, Aaron Jones kick good	47	35
4	0:06	12	90	2:19	Louisiana-Monroe	Brent Leonard 15-yard touchdown reception from Kolton Browning, Justin Manton kick good	47	42
"TOP" = time of possession. For other American football terms, see Glossary of American football.							47	42

=== West Virginia ===
#25 Baylor at #9 West Virginia

Team	1	2	3	4	Total
#25 Bears	14	21	7	21	63
• #9 Mountaineers	14	21	21	14	70

- Date: September 29
- Location: Mountaineer Field
  Morgantown, West Virginia
- Game start: 11:00 a.m. CDT
- Elapsed time: 3:46
- Game attendance: 60,012
- Game weather: 81 °F (27 °C), Clear, winds at mph
- Referee: Reggie Smith
- TV announcers (FX): Craig Bolerjack (Play-by-play), Joel Klatt (Color) & Petros Papadakis (Sideline)

In this first-ever meeting of the two schools, #25 Baylor traveled to Morgantown, West Virginia to take on early Heisman favorite Geno Smith and the #9 ranked Mountaineers in their Big XII conference debut. With the teams featuring offenses among the best and defenses among the worst that the FBS had to offer, the stage was set for an offensive shootout. After an early Nick Florence interception led to a WVU drive capped by a missed field goal, the offenses matched each other score for score in a first half which saw 10 touchdowns in 15 drives. The half concluded dramatically: with WVU leading 35–28, Florence was forced from the pocket and, inches from crossing the line of scrimmage, unleashed a 67-yard touchdown pass while scrambling as time expired. The teams went into the half tied 35–35. West Virginia pulled away in the 3rd quarter with 21 points to Baylor's 7 and clung tenaciously to the lead, scoring two more touchdowns in the 4th to Baylor's three. The Mountaineers' victorious Big XII debut proved to be a record-setting affair: Geno Smith tied a conference record with eight passing touchdowns (having completed 45/51 attempts, he finished the game with more touchdown passes than incompletions); Nick Florence and Geno Smith set school records for single-game passing yardage (581 and 656 yards, respectively); West Virginia set a school record for total yardage (807 yards); Stedman Bailey hauled in a school record 5 touchdown receptions; and Bailey also set a Big XII conference record for single-game receiving yards (303 yards) only to see that surpassed moments later by Baylor's Terrance Williams, who finished with 314 receiving yards. Following the game, WVU moved to #8 in the AP poll, and Baylor dropped from the rankings. With 133 points combined, this game was the highest-scoring FBS game of 2012.

Scoring summary

Quarter	Time	Drive			Team	Scoring information	Score	
Quarter	Time	Plays	Yards	TOP	Team	Scoring information	Baylor	West Virginia
1	9:12	5	67	1:32	Baylor	Jarred Salubi 1-yard touchdown run, Aaron Jones kick good	7	0
1	5:32	9	75	3:40	West Virginia	Andrew Buie 1-yard touchdown run, Tyler Bitancurt kick good	7	7
1	2:39	9	54	2:53	Baylor	Glasco Martin IV 7-yard touchdown run, Aaron Jones kick good	14	7
1	0:42	6	60	1:57	West Virginia	J.D. Woods 7-yard touchdown reception from Geno Smith, Tyler Bitancurt kick good	14	14
2	9:00	4	23	1:03	Baylor	Glasco Martin IV 1-yard touchdown run, Aaron Jones kick good	21	14
2	6:55	6	75	2:05	West Virginia	Stedman Bailey 47-yard touchdown reception from Geno Smith, Tyler Bitancurt kick good	21	21
2	6:21	2	68	0:34	Baylor	Tevin Reese 65-yard touchdown reception from Nick Florence, Aaron Jones kick good	28	21
2	4:54	5	59	1:27	West Virginia	Stedman Bailey 20-yard touchdown reception from Geno Smith, Tyler Bitancurt kick good	28	28
2	0:29	8	87	1:58	West Virginia	Stedman Bailey 2-yard touchdown reception from Geno Smith, Tyler Bitancurt kick good	28	35
2	0:00	2	65	0:29	Baylor	Lanear Sampson 67-yard touchdown reception from Nick Florence, Aaron Jones kick good	35	35
3	12:31	7	75	2:29	West Virginia	Tavon Austin 45-yard touchdown reception from Geno Smith, Tyler Bitancurt kick good	35	42
3	9:13	7	84	2:48	West Virginia	Tavon Austin 52-yard touchdown reception from Geno Smith, Tyler Bitancurt kick good	35	49
3	5:16	7	71	2:40	West Virginia	Andrew Buie 1-yard touchdown run, Tyler Bitancurt kick good	35	56
3	3:18	9	94	1:58	Baylor	Terrance Williams 37-yard touchdown reception from Nick Florence, Aaron Jones kick good	42	56
4	14:14	11	63	3:08	Baylor	Nick Florence 1-yard touchdown run, Aaron Jones kick good	49	56
4	13:55	1	87	0:19	West Virginia	Stedman Bailey 87-yard touchdown reception from Geno Smith, Tyler Bitancurt kick good	49	63
4	10:49	11	86	3:06	Baylor	Antwan Goodley 7-yard touchdown reception from Nick Florence, Aaron Jones kick good	56	63
4	5:55	10	75	4:54	West Virginia	Stedman Bailey 39-yard touchdown reception from Geno Smith, Tyler Bitancurt kick good	56	70
4	3:08	10	75	2:47	Baylor	Terrance Williams 8-yard touchdown reception from Nick Florence, Aaron Jones kick good	63	70
"TOP" = time of possession. For other American football terms, see Glossary of American football.							63	70

=== TCU ===
TCU at Baylor

Team	1	2	3	4	Total
• Horned Frogs	7	7	14	21	49
Bears	7	0	14	0	21

- Date: October 13
- Location: Floyd Casey Stadium
  Waco, Texas
- Game start: 6:00 p.m. CDT
- Elapsed time: 3:14
- Game attendance: 42,524
- Game weather: 80 °F (27 °C), Cloudy Skies, winds SSE at 18mph
- Referee: Tom Walker
- TV announcers (FSN): Mike Morgan (Play-by-play), J. C. Pearson (Color) & Laura McKeeman (Sideline)

Following their first defeat of the season, the Bears returned to Waco to take on the second Big 12 newcomer, a TCU Horned Frogs team suffering from attrition both on and off the field. Veteran TCU quarterback Casey Pachall had been suspended from the team less than two weeks prior, and freshman Trevon Boykin was slated to start his second game ever against Baylor. The game started well for the Bears, as Florence connected with Williams for a touchdown on the second offensive play of the game. But then the Baylor offense began to implode as Boykin and TCU responded to tie the game at 7–7 after the first of 4 Florence interceptions and 6 total turnovers on the day. TCU tacked on another touchdown to go into the half leading 14–7. During the third quarter the teams traded scores evenly to go to the fourth with the score 28–21 in favor of TCU. The fourth quarter was dominated by the Horned Frogs, who scored 3 touchdowns and held Baylor scoreless. The loss snapped Baylor's home winning streak and ended Baylor's streak of games in which they scored 40+ points.

Scoring summary

Quarter	Time	Drive			Team	Scoring information	Score	
Quarter	Time	Plays	Yards	TOP	Team	Scoring information	Texas Christian	Baylor
1	14:34	2	75	0:26	Baylor	Terrance Williams 74-yard touchdown reception from Nick Florence, Aaron Jones kick good	0	7
1	8:56	8	55	4:10	TCU	Cam White 18-yard touchdown reception from Trevone Boykin, Jaden Oberkrom kick good	7	7
2	2:45	16	75	7:42	TCU	Cam White 15-yard touchdown reception from Trevone Boykin, Jaden Oberkrom kick good	14	7
3	10:48	9	75	4:12	TCU	LaDarius Brown 43-yard touchdown reception from Trevone Boykin, Jaden Oberkrom kick good	21	7
3	9:12	7	75	1:36	Baylor	Nick Florence 5-yard touchdown run, Aaron Jones kick good	21	14
3	1:28	15	74	7:44	TCU	Josh Boyce 2-yard touchdown run, Jaden Oberkrom kick good	28	14
3	1:13	1	77	0:15	Baylor	Terrance Williams 77-yard touchdown reception from Nick Florence, Aaron Jones kick good	28	21
4	11:29	10	75	4:44	TCU	Laderice Sanders 2-yard touchdown run, Jaden Oberkrom kick good	35	21
4	9:11	3	14	1:35	TCU	Josh Boyce 15-yard touchdown reception from Trevone Boykin, Jaden Oberkrom kick good	42	21
4	5:33	4	4	2:08	TCU	Trevone Boykin 3-yard touchdown run, Jaden Oberkrom kick good	49	21
"TOP" = time of possession. For other American football terms, see Glossary of American football.							49	21

=== Texas ===
Baylor at #25 Texas

Team	1	2	3	4	Total
Bears	21	10	12	7	50
• #25 Longhorns	14	28	7	7	56

- Date: October 20
- Location: Darrell K Royal–Texas Memorial Stadium
  Austin, Texas
- Game start: 7:00 p.m. CDT
- Elapsed time: 3:32
- Game attendance: 101,353
- Game weather: 84 °F (29 °C), Clear, winds S at 5–10mph
- Referee: Dan Romeo
- TV announcers (ABC): Sean McDonough (Play-by-play), Chris Spielman (Color) & [[Quint Kessenich[]] (Sideline)

A wild shootout in Austin ended with Baylor falling just short of a third consecutive victory over the Longhorns. Texas scored first on an 84-yard touchdown rush by Daje Johnson on the first play from scrimmage, and forced a Baylor punt. However, the Bears stopped the ensuing Texas drive, and an errant long snap with the Longhorns in punt formation led to an 8-yard Florence touchdown rush to tie the game. The teams scored a combined 10 touchdowns in a first half that ended with an Aaron Jones field goal to bring the Bears to within 11 points of Texas. In the third quarter, Baylor scored nine points on a field goal and a touchdown (failed two-point conversion) to close to 40–42. But Texas held, scoring two more touchdowns and holding Baylor to a field goal on a subsequent scoring drive to maintain a 6-point lead. The 106 points scored was the most in any Longhorn football game since 1950, and the Longhorns yielded the most points in school history (50) in a winning effort.

Scoring summary

Quarter	Time	Drive			Team	Scoring information	Score	
Quarter	Time	Plays	Yards	TOP	Team	Scoring information	Baylor	Texas
1	14:43	1	84	0:17	Texas	Daje Johnson 84-yard touchdown run, Anthony Fera kick good	0	7
1	11:51	1	8	0:08	Baylor	Nick Florence 8-yard touchdown run, Aaron Jones kick good	7	7
1	6:58	9	72	4:53	Texas	Joe Bergeron 15-yard touchdown run, Anthony Fera kick good	7	14
1	4:08	9	75	2:50	Baylor	Glasco Martin IV 2-yard touchdown run, Aaron Jones kick good	14	14
1	2:42	2	82	0:41	Baylor	Terrance Williams 80-yard touchdown reception from Nick Florence, Aaron Jones kick good	21	14
2	13:57	8	75	3:45	Texas	Joe Bergeron 2-yard touchdown run, Anthony Fera kick good	21	21
2	11:45	7	75	2:12	Baylor	Lanear Sampson 7-yard touchdown reception from Nick Florence, Aaron Jones kick good	28	21
2	9:38	4	30	2:07	Texas	Joe Bergeron 9-yard touchdown run, Anthony Fera kick good	28	28
2	6:18	5	63	2:12	Texas	Johnathan Gray 25-yard touchdown run, Anthony Fera kick good	28	35
2	1:06	13	66	3:46	Texas	Joe Bergeron 4-yard touchdown run, Anthony Fera kick good	28	42
2	0:00	7	63	1:06	Baylor	29-yard field goal by Aaron Jones	31	42
3	12:21	7	75	2:39	Baylor	Jordan Najvar (Nick Florence fumble recovered in endzone) 0-yard touchdown run, 2-point Nick Florence pass incomplete	37	42
3	7:09	11	58	3:10	Baylor	42-yard field goal by Aaron Jones	40	42
3	6:31	2	75	0:38	Texas	Joe Bergeron 8-yard touchdown run, Anthony Fera kick good	40	49
3	2:12	11	53	4:19	Baylor	44-yard field goal by Aaron Jones	43	49
4	12:16	7	46	2:53	Texas	Mike Davis 15-yard touchdown reception from David Ash, Anthony Fera kick good	43	56
4	1:57	15	94	5:24	Baylor	Nick Florence 1-yard touchdown run, Aaron Jones kick good	50	56
"TOP" = time of possession. For other American football terms, see Glossary of American football.							50	56

=== Iowa State ===
Baylor at Iowa State

Team	1	2	3	4	Total
Bears	7	7	0	7	21
• Cyclones	7	14	7	7	35

- Date: October 27
- Location: Jack Trice Stadium
  Ames, IA
- Game start: 6:00 p.m. CDT
- Elapsed time: 3:34
- Game attendance: 54,877
- Game weather: 40 °F (4 °C), Mostly Clear, winds E at 0–5mph
- Referee: Rick Loumiet
- TV announcers (FSN): Mike Morgan (Play-by-play), J. C. Pearson (Color) & Laura McKeeman (Sideline)

After three straight losses, the Bears travelled to Ames, Iowa to take on an Iowa State team that had beaten TCU at home and played respectably against conference leader Kansas State. The game, played on a cold October night, had more than its share of dropped passes and offensive miscues. Iowa State attempted an onside kick to open the game that was recovered by Baylor; however, a Florence fumble in the end zone meant that the Bears would have to wait until more than midway through the first quarter to put up the game's first points. Iowa State scored a touchdown in the first quarter to tie the game, and scored two more to Baylor's one in the second quarter to take a 21–14 lead into the half. The Bears continued to fight in the second, stopping a Cyclone drive with an interception in the red zone, but in a low-scoring second half Baylor's offense was able to reach the end zone only once more. In the meantime, ISU quarterback Steele Jantz set career highs for passing and touchdowns, tacking on two more passing touchdowns in the second half to go with his three from the first, and preserving the 35–21 victory for Iowa State.

Scoring summary

Quarter	Time	Drive			Team	Scoring information	Score	
Quarter	Time	Plays	Yards	TOP	Team	Scoring information	Baylor	Iowa State
1	5:20	9	80	2:44	Baylor	Jarred Salubi 2-yard touchdown run, Aaron Jones kick good	7	0
1	0:50	12	75	4:30	Iowa State	Jarvis West 23-yard touchdown reception from Steele Jantz, Edwin Arceo kick good	7	7
2	14:53	4	67	0:57	Baylor	Tevin Reese 49-yard touchdown reception from Nick Florence, Aaron Jones kick good	14	7
2	8:49	9	67	3:57	Iowa State	Albert Gary 36-yard touchdown reception from Steele Jantz, Edwin Arceo kick good	14	14
2	0:27	10	73	1:35	Iowa State	Jarvis West 7-yard touchdown reception from Steele Jantz, Edwin Arceo kick good	14	21
3	4:16	14	81	4:44	Iowa State	Jeff Woody 8-yard touchdown reception from Steele Jantz, Edwin Arceo kick good	14	28
4	8:37	5	36	2:24	Iowa State	Jarvis West 22-yard touchdown reception from Steele Jantz, Edwin Arceo kick good	14	35
4	6:14	8	74	2:23	Baylor	Lanear Sampson 3-yard touchdown reception from Nick Florence, Aaron Jones kick good	21	35
"TOP" = time of possession. For other American football terms, see Glossary of American football.							21	35

=== Kansas ===
Kansas at Baylor

Team	1	2	3	4	Total
Jayhawks	7	7	0	0	14
• Bears	17	3	14	7	41

- Date: November 3
- Location: Floyd Casey Stadium
  Waco, Texas
- Game start: 2:30 p.m. CDT
- Elapsed time: 4:19
- Game attendance: 38,039
- Game weather: 82 °F (28 °C), Partly Cloudy, winds SSW at 11mph
- Referee: Randy Christal
- TV announcers (FSN): Steve Physioc (Play-by-play), Brian Baldinger (Color) & Jim Knox (Sideline)

Back in Waco against the Jayhawks, Baylor jumped out to a 14–0 lead early behind two stops by the defense. A 59-yard touchdown rush by Kansas put them back in the game, but Baylor drove back down the field for a field goal and then stopped a Jayhawk drive early in the 2nd quarter that ended with a failed fake field goal rush at the Baylor 14-yard line. Subsequent offensive drives for both teams stalled until Kansas' Cummings, despite injuring his leg on the run, limped ahead of the Baylor defense into the end zone to make the game 17–14. Baylor managed another field goal to increase its lead to 6, and the teams went into the half with Baylor up 20–14. Lightning delayed the start of the second half for about 30 minutes; by the time the teams resumed play, a steady drizzle had begun. The Bears came up with a big stop on the first Jayhawk drive of the second half, with Kansas turning the ball over on downs near the Baylor 45. Baylor promptly punched the ball into the endzone on a Bryce Petty rush to make the score 27–14. A Joe Williams interception offered the Bears the chance to increase their lead, but their ensuing drive stalled. However, the Bears picked off Cummings again on the next drive, this time the interception coming from Ahmad Dixon, and Nick Florence added a rushing touchdown on the subsequent drive. Baylor would add one more touchdown in the 4th quarter, while holding Kansas scoreless throughout the second half to snap a 4-game losing streak.

Scoring summary

Quarter	Time	Drive			Team	Scoring information	Score	
Quarter	Time	Plays	Yards	TOP	Team	Scoring information	Kansas	Baylor
1	12:24	11	84	2:36	Baylor	Terrance Williams 11-yard touchdown reception from Nick Florence, Aaron Jones kick good	0	7
1	10:09	1	68	0:10	Baylor	Lache Seastrunk 68-yard touchdown reception from Nick Florence, Aaron Jones kick good	0	14
1	7:44	1	59	0:10	Kansas	James Sims 58-yard touchdown run, Nick Prolago kick good	7	14
1	3:57	10	58	3:47	Baylor	35-yard field goal by Aaron Jones	7	17
2	5:46	6	81	2:49	Kansas	Michael Cummings 22-yard touchdown run, Nick Prolago kick good	14	17
2	1:02	16	67	4:44	Baylor	22-yard field goal by Aaron Jones	14	20
3	10:59	4	55	1:01	Baylor	Bryce Petty 1-yard touchdown run, Aaron Jones kick good	14	27
3	2:24	6	40	2:05	Baylor	Nick Florence 7-yard touchdown run, Aaron Jones kick good	14	34
4	11:05	4	87	1:18	Baylor	Tevin Reese 40-yard touchdown reception from Nick Florence, Aaron Jones kick good	14	41
"TOP" = time of possession. For other American football terms, see Glossary of American football.							14	41

=== Oklahoma ===
Baylor at #12 Oklahoma

Team	1	2	3	4	Total
Bears	3	14	9	8	34
• #12 Sooners	14	14	7	7	42

- Date: November 10
- Location: Gaylord Family Oklahoma Memorial Stadium
  Norman, Oklahoma
- Game start: 2:30 p.m. CST
- Elapsed time: 3:43
- Game attendance: 84,945
- Game weather: 72 °F (22 °C), Partly Cloudy, winds S at 26mph
- Referee: Reggie Smith
- TV announcers (FSN): Steve Physioc (Play-by-play), J. C. Pearson (Color) & Laura McKeeman (Sideline)

Following their 4th win of the year against the Jayhawks in Waco, Baylor traveled to Norman to face a tough #12 Oklahoma Sooners team that had two home losses on the season (Kansas State and Notre Dame). The teams alternated scoring in the first half, with Oklahoma holding Baylor to a field-goal on their first scoring drive to take a 28–17 lead into the half. In the third quarter, Baylor struck first, scoring a field goal and then a touchdown to pull to within 2 of the Sooners (an attempted two-point conversion following the touchdown failed). Oklahoma's offense answered the challenge, however, with two touchdowns in the third and fourth quarters, one a 55-yard Blake Bell rush. Lache Seastrunk added a rushing touchdown late in the game and Nick Florence rushed for a successful two-point conversion to bring the Bears to within a touchdown of Oklahoma, but with less than 1:30 left in the game, Oklahoma ran out the clock for the win. Baylor fell to 4–5 on the season.

Scoring summary

Quarter	Time	Drive			Team	Scoring information	Score	
Quarter	Time	Plays	Yards	TOP	Team	Scoring information	Baylor	Oklahoma
1	9:58	11	75	5:02	Oklahoma	Brennan Clay 5-yard touchdown reception from Landry Jones, Michael Hunnicutt kick good	0	7
2	8:20	6	34	1:38	Baylor	58-yard field goal by Aaron Jones	3	7
1	2:55	12	75	5:25	Oklahoma	Brennan Clay 1-yard touchdown run, Michael Hunnicutt kick good	3	14
2	9:38	6	80	1:22	Baylor	Nick Florence 5-yard touchdown run, Aaron Jones kick good	10	14
2	6:17	8	70	3:21	Oklahoma	Damien Williams 3-yard touchdown run, Michael Hunnicutt kick good	10	21
2	0:32	17	75	5:45	Baylor	Lache Seastrunk 4-yard touchdown run, Aaron Jones kick good	17	21
2	0:15	2	45	0:17	Oklahoma	Justin Brown 35-yard touchdown reception from Landry Jones, Michael Hunnicutt kick good	17	28
3	12:21	8	71	2:39	Baylor	21-yard field goal by Aaron Jones	20	28
3	7:42	6	28	1:59	Baylor	Lache Seastrunk 2-yard touchdown run, 2-point Jarred Salubi rush failed	26	28
3	2:10	12	75	5:32	Oklahoma	Damien Williams 17-yard touchdown run, Michael Hunnicut kick good	26	35
4	14:14	3	64	1:24	Oklahoma	Blake Bell 55-yard touchdown run, Michael Hunnicutt kick good	26	42
4	1:26	19	80	4:42	Baylor	Lache Seastrunk 6-yard touchdown run, 2-point Nick Florence rush good	34	42
"TOP" = time of possession. For other American football terms, see Glossary of American football.							34	42

=== Kansas State ===
#1 Kansas State at Baylor

Team	1	2	3	4	Total
#1 Wildcats	7	10	7	0	24
• Bears	14	14	24	0	52

- Date: November 17
- Location: Floyd Casey Stadium
  Waco, Texas
- Game start: 7:00 p.m. CST
- Elapsed time: 3:28
- Game attendance: 38,029
- Game weather: 55 °F (13 °C), Clear, winds SE at 4mph
- Referee: Scott Novak
- TV announcers (ESPN): Brad Nessler (Play-by-play), Todd Blackledge (Color) & Holly Rowe (Sideline)

One week after falling in Norman, and almost a year to the day after the Bears' BCS-shaking first victory against Oklahoma, the Bears again took on a top 5 opponent in Waco. This time the opponent was 10–0 Kansas State, ranked #1 in the BCS after an Alabama loss the previous week and clear favorites in their final two games of the year, at Baylor and vs. Texas. As so often during the season, the quick-strike Baylor offense put the Bears ahead early on a 38-yard Florence pass to Tevin Reese. Kansas State answered when then-Heisman favorite Collin Klein completed a touchdown pass to tie the game 7–7. Baylor subsequently put up 21 unanswered points to go ahead 28–7 before the Wildcats managed 10 more points in the final two minutes of the first half. In the third quarter, Baylor put up another touchdown (a 4-yard Glasco Martin IV rush) and forced a Kansas State punt that pinned Baylor on their own 1-yard line. Two plays later, Florence attempted a quick pass to Terrance Williams that was intercepted on the 2-yard line, setting up a Collin Klein touchdown rush that made the score 35–24 in Baylor's favor. The Bears went on to rack up 17 more points in the third quarter, the last touchdown coming on an 80-yard Lache Seastrunk rush after Joe Williams intercepted Klein in the endzone (the third of Klein's three interceptions on the night). With 58 seconds remaining in the third quarter following Seastrunk's touchdown, Kansas State embarked upon an 8-minute, 21 play, 74-yard drive that brought the Wildcats to first-and-goal from the Baylor 6-yard line. An inspired Baylor defense turned in the goal-line stand of their season, halting four straight Collin Klein rushes and forcing a turnover on downs. Baylor would subsequently almost completely run down the clock, picking up 4 first downs on 10 straight rushes before punting the ball back to Kansas State with only 32 seconds left in the game. The victory was Baylor's first ever over a #1 ranked opponent (the 1956 team defeated #2 Tennessee in the 1957 Sugar Bowl, and the 1941 team tied #1 Texas) and represented only the fifth time in the BCS era that the #1 ranked team lost to an unranked opponent. The win took Baylor to 5–5 on the season, needing one more victory for bowl eligibility.

Scoring summary

Quarter	Time	Drive			Team	Scoring information	Score	
Quarter	Time	Plays	Yards	TOP	Team	Scoring information	Kansas State	Baylor
1	13:04	6	82	1:56	Baylor	Tevin Reese 38-yard touchdown reception from Nick Florence, Aaron Jones kick good	0	7
1	9:47	6	38	3:17	Kansas State	Torell Miller 8-yard touchdown reception from Collin Klein, Anthony Cantele kick good	7	7
1	6:29	11	75	3:18	Baylor	Nick Florence 12-yard touchdown run, Aaron Jones kick good	7	14
2	6:42	8	55	3:23	Baylor	Terrance Williams 22-yard touchdown reception from Nick Florence, Aaron Jones kick good	7	21
2	2:54	9	64	2:47	Baylor	Glasco Martin IV 2-yard touchdown run, Aaron Jones kick good	7	28
2	1:47	4	63	1:07	Kansas State	Chris Harper 7-yard touchdown reception from Collin Klein, Anthony Cantele kick good	14	28
2	0:00	10	63	0:51	Kansas State	23-yard field goal by Anthony Cantele	17	28
3	13:19	4	38	0:49	Baylor	Glasco Martin IV 4-yard touchdown run, Aaron Jones kick good	17	35
3	12:25	1	1	0:05	Kansas State	Collin Klein 1-yard touchdown run, Anthony Cantele kick good	24	35
3	7:58	13	45	4:27	Baylor	50-yard field goal by Aaron Jones	24	38
3	4:32	4	54	1:19	Baylor	Glasco Martin IV 15-yard touchdown run, Aaron Jones kick good	24	45
3	0:58	1	80	0:12	Baylor	Lache Seastrunk 80-yard touchdown run, Aaron Jones kick good	24	52
"TOP" = time of possession. For other American football terms, see Glossary of American football.							24	52

=== Texas Tech ===
Texas Tech vs Baylor (neutral site game)

Team	1	2	3	4	OT	Total
• Bears	7	7	14	17	7	52
Red Raiders	14	7	10	14	0	45

- Date: November 24
- Location: Cowboys Stadium
  Arlington, Texas
- Game start: 2:30 p.m. CST
- Elapsed time: 3:45
- Game attendance: 44,168
- Game weather: Indoors
- Referee: Tom Walker
- TV announcers (FOX): Craig Bolerjack (Play-by-play), Joel Klatt (Color) & Petros Papadakis (Sideline)

The Bears and Red Raiders again met at Cowboys Stadium to renew their rivalry. Texas Tech jumped out to an early 21–7 lead after the Red Raider defense shut down the Baylor offense in the red zone and Aaron Jones missed two field goals early in the game. Near the end of the second quarter Texas Tech was driving to go into halftime up by three touchdowns; however, a fumble inside Baylor territory led to a quick-strike Baylor scoring drive capped by a 39-yard Florence touchdown pass to Tevin Reese. Texas Tech got the ball to start the second half and put themselves ahead by 10 with a field goal. After Baylor answered two drives later with a touchdown, Leon Mackey fielded the ensuing kickoff and returned it for a 97-yard touchdown. The Bears answered with a touchdown drive to close the deficit to 28–31 with just over 2 minutes left in the 3rd. Subsequently, Baylor linebacker Eddie Lackey returned a Seth Doege interception for a touchdown to give Baylor its first lead of the game. Baylor picked up another TD and the Red Raiders tacked own two touchdowns before Aaron Jones kicked his only good field goal of the night, a 22 yarder that tied the game up at 45. With 2:48 left in the game, Texas Tech began a drive which ended with another Doege interception, this time a screen pass deflected off a Red Raider lineman's helmet into Lackey's arms. After Jones missed a game-winning field goal, Baylor scored on its opening overtime possession on a Glasco Martin IV touchdown rush. Texas Tech subsequently failed to convert on 4th and 5, giving Baylor its 6th win of the season.

Scoring summary

Quarter	Time	Drive			Team	Scoring information	Score	
Quarter	Time	Plays	Yards	TOP	Team	Scoring information	Baylor	Texas Tech
1	10:37	7	75	2:05	Texas Tech	Seth Doege 19-yard touchdown run, Ryan Bustin kick good	0	7
1	3:02	10	80	3:34	Texas Tech	Kenny Williams 5-yard touchdown run, Ryan Bustin kick good	0	14
1	0:12	7	53	2:50	Baylor	Glasco Martin IV 1-yard touchdown run, Aaron Jones kick good	7	14
2	14:17	3	75	0:55	Texas Tech	Eric Ward 23-yard touchdown reception from Seth Doege, Ryan Bustin kick good	7	21
2	0:05	8	93	1:27	Baylor	Levi Norwood 39-yard touchdown reception from Nick Florence, Aaron Jones kick good	14	21
3	10:45	11	63	4:15	Texas Tech	29-yard field goal by Ryan Bustin	14	24
3	4:50	9	68	2:41	Baylor	Nick Florence 4-yard touchdown run, Aaron Jones kick good	21	24
3	4:50	1	97		Texas Tech	Jakeem Grant 97-yard kickoff return	21	31
3	2:16	7	57	2:20	Baylor	Lanear Sampson 27-yard touchdown reception from Nick Florence, Aaron Jones kick good	28	31
4	14:44				Baylor	Interception returned 55 yards for touchdown by Eddie Lackey, Aaron Jones kick good	35	31
4	12:24	5	71	2:20	Texas Tech	Darrin Moore 15-yard touchdown reception from Seth Doege, Ryan Bustin kick good	35	38
4	8:58	10	75	3:26	Baylor	Terrance Williams 4-yard touchdown reception from Nick Florence, Aaron Jones kick good	42	38
4	6:19	6	63	2:39	Texas Tech	Darrin Moore 6-yard touchdown reception from Seth Doege, Ryan Bustin kick good	42	45
4	2:48	11	65	3:31	Baylor	22-yard field goal by Aaron Jones	45	45
OT		4	25		Baylor	Glasco Martin IV 4-yard touchdown run, Aaron Jones kick good	52	45
"TOP" = time of possession. For other American football terms, see Glossary of American football.							52	45

=== Oklahoma State ===
#23 Oklahoma State at Baylor

Team	1	2	3	4	Total
#23 Cowboys	3	14	3	14	34
• Bears	17	14	3	7	41

- Date: December 1
- Location: Floyd Casey Stadium
  Waco, Texas
- Game start: 11:00 a.m. CST
- Elapsed time: 3:51
- Game attendance: 38,203
- Game weather: 73 °F (23 °C), Cloudy, winds SSW at 17mph
- Referee: Greg Burks
- TV announcers (FX): Craig Bolerjack (Play-by-play), Joel Klatt (Color) & Darius Walker (Sideline)

With bowl eligibility already assured, Baylor now looked to improve their bowl berth against Oklahoma State. The teams traded field goals, and then Eddie Lackey, the previous week's Big 12 defensive player of the week, returned a Clint Chelf interception for a touchdown. Baylor tacked on two more touchdowns, scoring 24 unanswered points before Oklahoma State again found the end zone. The subsequent Baylor drive stalled after a controversial Seastrunk fumble, and the Cowboys capitalized again to make the score 17–24 in favor of the Bears. Fighting back, Baylor scored another touchdown and added a second interception, this time by Mike Hicks. An Aaron Jones field goal attempt following the interception was blocked, and the teams entered the half with the score Baylor 31, Oklahoma State 17. In the second half, Oklahoma State fought to close the gap, drawing to within 7 of the Bears before Seastrunk rushed 76 yards for a touchdown despite suffering a quadriceps cramp with 45 yards to go. Oklahoma State scored once more to again close to within 7 but with just over a minute left in the game, Baylor was able to run out the clock to cap a 7 win season.

Scoring summary

Quarter	Time	Drive			Team	Scoring information	Score	
Quarter	Time	Plays	Yards	TOP	Team	Scoring information	Oklahoma State	Baylor
1	10:32	12	55	4:28	Oklahoma State	36-yard field goal by Quinn Sharp	3	0
1	8:05	11	60	2:27	Baylor	39-yard field goal by Aaron Jones	3	3
1	7:58				Baylor	Interception returned 26 yards for touchdown by Eddie Lackey, Aaron Jones kick good	3	10
1	0:20	16	98	4:32	Baylor	Glasco Martin IV 2-yard touchdown run, Aaron Jones kick good	3	17
2	14:31	1	75	0:10	Baylor	Tevin Reese 75-yard touchdown reception from Nick Florence, Aaron Jones kick good	3	24
2	11:23	10	56	3:08	Oklahoma State	J. W. Walsh 1-yard touchdown run, Quinn Sharp kick good	10	24
2	6:50	8	77	2:36	Oklahoma State	Josh Stewart 15-yard touchdown reception from Clint Chelf, Quinn Sharp kick good	17	24
2	3:33	8	75	3:17	Baylor	Nick Florence 3-yard touchdown run, Aaron Jones kick good	17	31
3	11:27	7	50	2:08	Oklahoma State	43-yard field goal by Quinn Sharp	20	31
3	6:25	14	64	5:02	Baylor	23-yard field goal by Aaron Jones	20	34
4	5:30	12	88	3:31	Oklahoma State	J.W. Walsh 4-yard touchdown run, Quinn Sharp kick good	27	34
4	5:11	1	76	0:19	Baylor	Lache Seastrunk 76-yard touchdown run, Aaron Jones kick good	27	41
4	1:16	9	84	1:33	Oklahoma State	David Glidden 18-yard touchdown reception from Clint Chelf, Quinn Sharp kick good	34	41
"TOP" = time of possession. For other American football terms, see Glossary of American football.							34	41

=== Holiday Bowl ===
Baylor vs. #17 UCLA

Team	1	2	3	4	Total
• Bears	14	21	7	7	49
#17 Bruins	0	10	3	13	26

- Date: December 27
- Location: Qualcomm Stadium
  San Diego
- Game start: 7:00 p.m. PST
- Elapsed time: 3:30
- Game attendance: 55,507
- Game weather: 53 °F (12 °C), Clear, winds calm
- Referee: Wayne Winkler
- TV announcers (ESPN): Dave Pasch (Play-by-play), Brian Griese (Color) & Jenn Brown (Sideline)

On December 2, 2012, Baylor accepted its first-ever berth in the Holiday Bowl. The Bears would face the #17 UCLA Bruins, winners of the Pac-12 South Division, for the first time in school history. After both teams' first drives ended in punts, Baylor's Glasco Martin IV rushed for a touchdown from 4 yards out to cap the Bears' second drive. That touchdown represented the first of 21 unanswered points for Baylor, including touchdown receptions by Tevin Reese and Antwan Goodley. Sterling defensive play by Baylor held UCLA scoreless until midway through the 2nd quarter – Baylor's defense, which had tallied 13 total sacks all season, recorded 5 sacks of UCLA quarterback Brett Hundley in the first half while shutting down UCLA's attempts to rush. UCLA finally got on the board with just over six minutes left in the first half, scoring a touchdown on a 2-play, 21-yard drive set up by a Jordan Najvar fumble. Baylor would answer on its subsequent two drives, with Martin IV adding a 26-yard touchdown run and Lache Seastrunk rushing for a 43-yard touchdown. With time winding down in the first half, UCLA tacked on a field-goal and the teams went to halftime with Baylor leading 35–10.

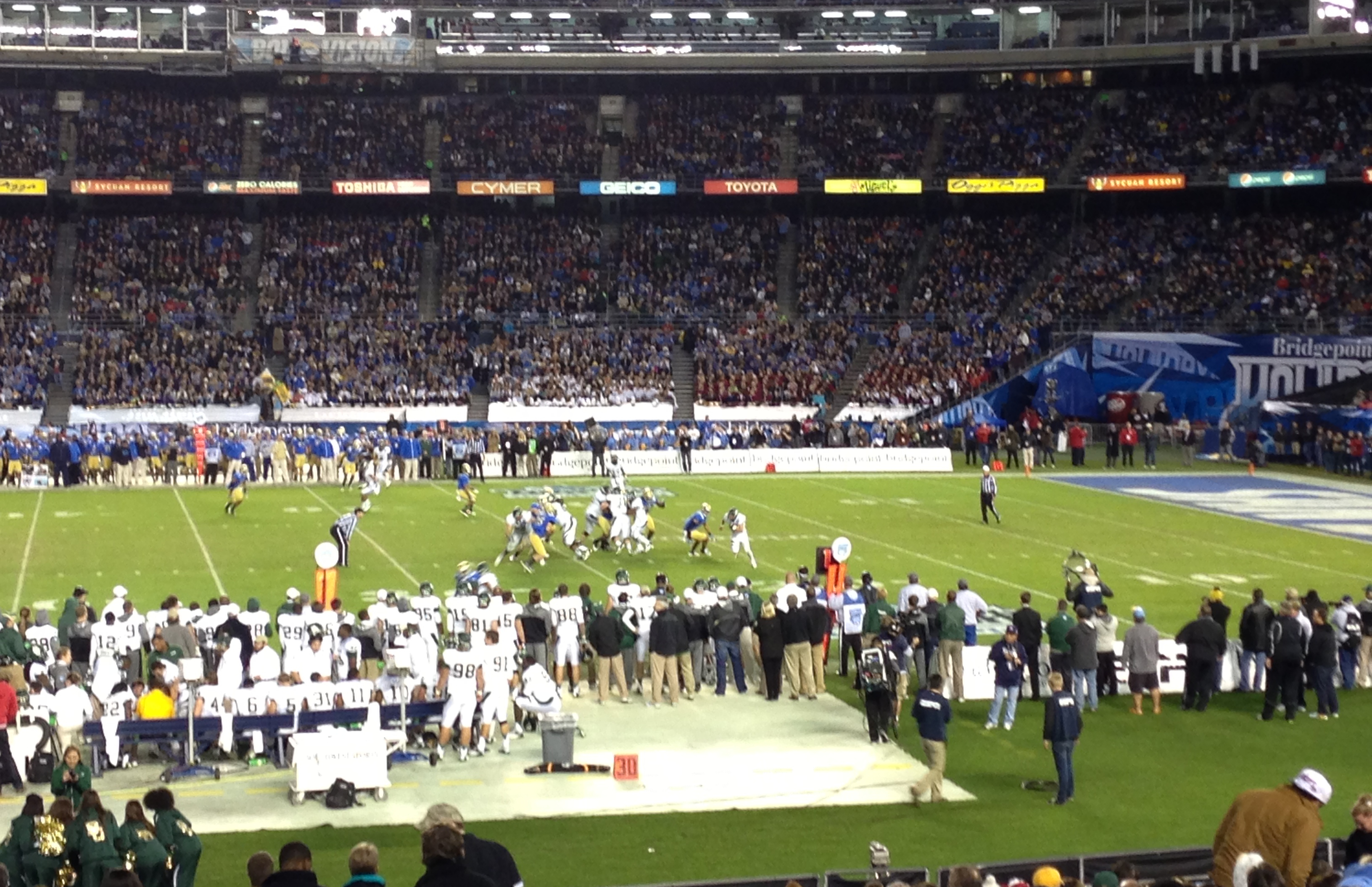
Gameplay during the first half of the 2012 Holiday Bowl.

UCLA received the ball to start the second half, but turned the ball over on downs at the Baylor 48. The Bears' ensuing drive faltered, however, and Baylor was forced to punt the ball back to the Bruins, who put together a 9-play, 58-yard drive culminating in a second UCLA field goal. Late in the 3rd quarter, Glasco Martin IV rushed the ball in for his third touchdown of the game, this time from 1 yard out. In the 4th, UCLA added a touchdown following a Baylor fumble, but an attempted 2-point conversion failed. Nick Florence tacked on Baylor's final touchdown of the game with a 1-yard rush of his own at the 7:46 mark of the 4th. After UCLA turned the ball over on downs in their ensuing possession, Baylor took possession and ran the clock down to 8 seconds before turning the ball over on downs at their own 34. With time for one play left in the game, Hundley completed a pass to Logan Sweet for a 34-yard touchdown. The play was not reviewed during the game, but replays appeared to show that Sweet was down at the 1-yard line.

While the score of the game is officially 49–26, Baylor Head Coach Art Briles ignored the final touchdown and had the score changed to 49–19 on the championship rings presented to Baylor players commemorating the victory. CBSSports.com called the changing of the score "an arrogant move."

Baylor finished the game with 494 total yards, 306 of which came on the ground. 138 of those yards came from Lache Seastrunk, who finished with one rushing touchdown and was named the offensive player of the game. The Bears' offense, typically known for its aerial attack, attempted only 13 passes for 10 completions and 188 yards. That passing yardage, however, was sufficient to allow Nick Florence to finish the season with 4,309 passing yards, overtaking Robert Griffin III's school record 4,293 passing yards, set during his 2011 Heisman-winning campaign. The Baylor defense, which entered the game ranked among the worst of FBS schools, allowed the Bears to overcome three turnovers. Although the defense created no turnovers of its own, Baylor sacked Hundley 6 times, limited UCLA to only 33 total yards on the ground, and allowed the Bruins to convert on only 1 of 17 third downs. Two of Baylor's sacks came from defensive end Chris McAllister, who was named the defensive player of the game. The victory gave the Bears bowl wins in consecutive seasons for the second time in school history (1985 Liberty Bowl, 1986 Bluebonnet Bowl; 2011 Alamo Bowl, 2012 Holiday Bowl).

Scoring summary

Quarter	Time	Drive			Team	Scoring information	Score	
Quarter	Time	Plays	Yards	TOP	Team	Scoring information	Baylor	UCLA
1	8:01	6	53	1:43	Baylor	Glasco Martin 4-yard touchdown run, Aaron Jones kick good	7	0
1	4:22	7	84	3:04	Baylor	Antwan Goodley 8-yard touchdown reception from Nick Florence, Aaron Jones kick good	14	0
2	11:08	5	76	1:36	Baylor	Tevin Reese 55-yard touchdown reception from Nick Florence, Aaron Jones kick good	21	0
2	6:21	2	21	0:34	UCLA	Joseph Fauria 22-yard touchdown reception from Brett Hundley, Kaʻimi Fairbairn kick good	21	7
2	4:36	7	75	1:45	Baylor	Glasco Martin 26-yard touchdown run, Aaron Jones kick good	28	7
2	1:58	4	56	1:17	Baylor	Lache Seastrunk 43-yard touchdown run, Aaron Jones kick good	35	7
2	0:07	13	53	1:51	UCLA	30-yard field goal by Kaʻimi Fairbairn	35	10
3	8:18	9	58	2:55	UCLA	40-yard field goal by Kaʻimi Fairbairn	35	13
3	1:52	7	59	2:44	Baylor	Glasco Martin 1-yard touchdown run, Aaron Jones kick good	42	13
4	12:25	5	35	2:17	UCLA	Shaquelle Evans 24-yard touchdown reception from Brett Hundley, 2-point Brett Hundley pass attempt failed	42	19
4	7:46	7	31	3:20	Baylor	Nick Florence 1-yard touchdown run, Aaron Jones kick good	49	19
4	0:00	1	34	0:08	UCLA	Logan Sweet 34-yard touchdown reception from Brett Hundley, Aaron Jones kick good	49	26
"TOP" = time of possession. For other American football terms, see Glossary of American football.							49	26
