= 2012 Fiesta Bowl =

2012 Tostitos Fiesta Bowl
- BCS Bowl Game; 41st Fiesta Bowl
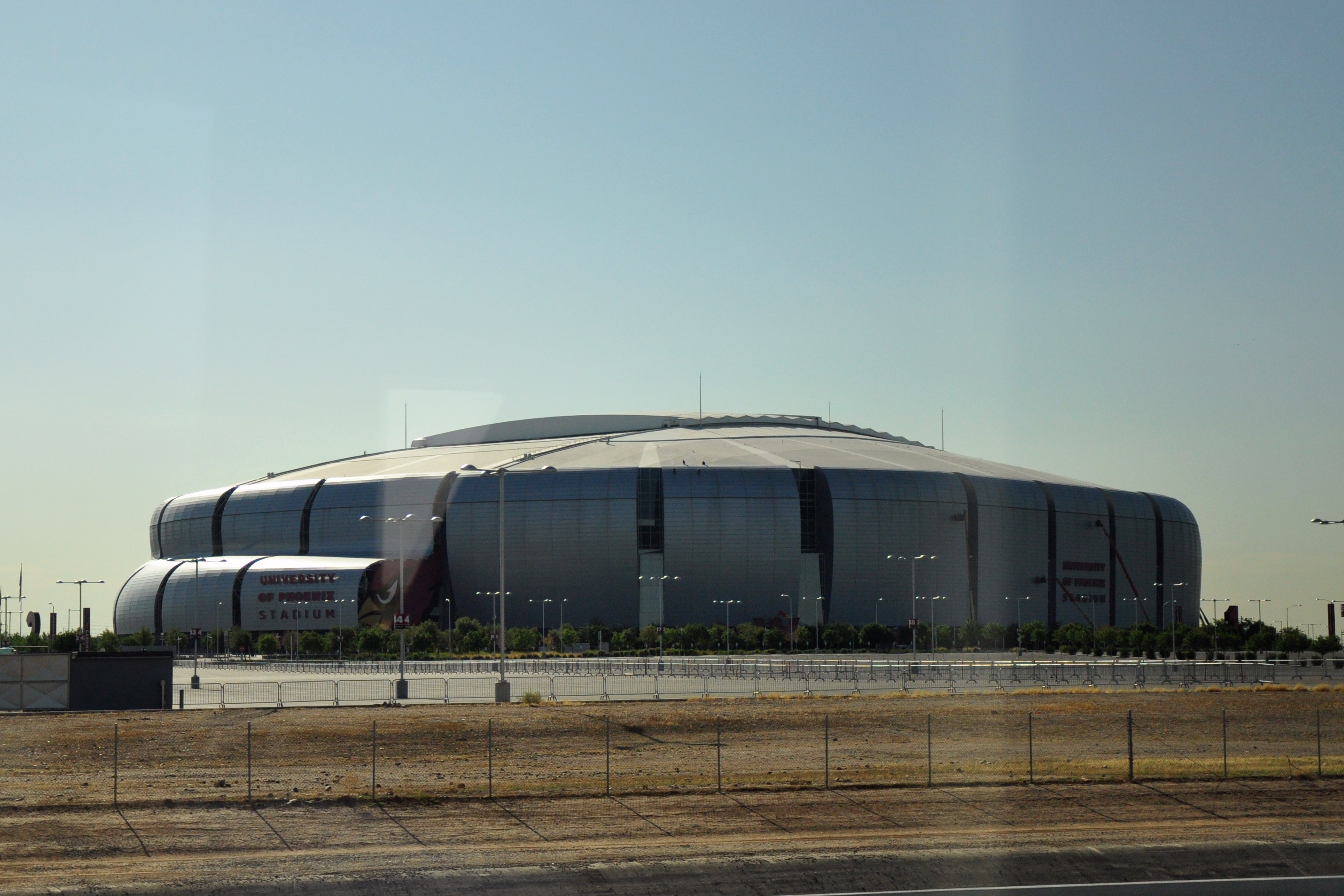
- University of Phoenix Stadium in Glendale, Arizona, hosted the Fiesta Bowl.
Stanford Cardinal	Oklahoma State Cowboys
(11–1)	(11–1)
Pac-12	Big 12
38	41
Head coach: David Shaw	Head coach: Mike Gundy
AP / Coaches / BCS; 4 / 4 / 4	AP / Coaches / BCS; 3 / 3 / 3
	1	2	3	4	OT	Total
Stanford	7	14	7	10	0	38
Oklahoma State	0	21	3	14	3	41
- Date: January 2, 2012
- Season: 2011
- Stadium: University of Phoenix Stadium
- Location: Glendale, Arizona
- MVP: Offensive: Justin Blackmon (WR, OSU); Andrew Luck (QB, Stanford); Defensive: Justin Gilbert (DB, OSU); Terrence Brown (DB, Stanford); Sportsmanship: Grant Garner (OL, OSU); Andrew Luck (QB, Stanford)
- Favorite: Oklahoma State by 3
- Referee: Tom Ritter (Southeastern Conference)
- Attendance: 69,927
- Payout: US$17,000,000 per team

United States TV coverage
- Network: ESPN
- Announcers: Sean McDonough (Play-by-Play); Matt Millen (Analyst); Heather Cox (Sidelines)
- Nielsen ratings: 9.60

The 2012 Tostitos Fiesta Bowl was a postseason college football bowl game played at University of Phoenix Stadium in Glendale, Arizona. The Oklahoma State Cowboys, champions of the Big 12 Conference, played the Stanford Cardinal, an at-large selection from the Pac-12 Conference. Oklahoma State won the game, 41–38, in overtime.

Originally this game was scheduled for January 5 pending resolution of the 2011 NFL lockout and a possible Monday Night Football game on January 2. However, with the resolution of the lockout, the game was moved to the spot following the 2012 Rose Bowl. The game aired on ESPN.

== Teams ==
This game was the first meeting between the two teams.

=== Oklahoma State ===
Big 12 champion Oklahoma State made their first ever trip to a BCS bowl game. Oklahoma State ranked second in passing offense (386.25 yards per game), scoring offense (49.33 points), turnover margin (1.67) during the season, and turnovers (42). The Cowboy offense featured the combination of quarterback Brandon Weeden and wide receiver Justin Blackmon, both of whom were taken in the first round of the 2012 NFL draft. Weeden in 12 games, completed 379 of 522 passes for 4,328 yards while Blackmon caught 113 passes for 1,336 yards. Oklahoma State was not selected for the National Championship game, after being upset by Iowa State just a few weeks earlier.

=== Stanford ===
Stanford has a 5–7 record against the Big 12 Conference teams (1–0 Kansas; 1–0 Missouri; 1–4 Oklahoma; 2–2 Texas; 0–1 Texas A&M). Stanford played in the 2009 Sun Bowl and lost to Oklahoma 31–27. Prior to its loss to Oregon on November 12, the Cardinal were winners of its first nine games of the season and 17 in a row. The team ranked second in the conference and 22nd nationally in rushing offense (207.92 yards per game), led by All-American Quarterback Andrew Luck, who was the first player selected in the 2012 NFL draft.

== Game Summary ==
=== Scoring summary ===
Scoring Play	Score
1st quarter
STAN – Ty Montgomery 53-yard pass from Andrew Luck. (Jordan Williamson kick), 04:16	STAN 7–0
2nd quarter
STAN – Jeremy Stewart 24-yard run. (Jordan Williamson kick), 10:21	STAN 14–0
OKST – Justin Blackmon 43-yard pass from Brandon Weeden. (Quinn Sharp kick), 08:50	STAN 14–7
OKST – Justin Blackmon 67-yard pass from Brandon Weeden. (Quinn Sharp kick), 06:19	14–14
STAN – Stepfan Taylor 4-yard run. (Jordan Williamson kick), 02:25	STAN 21–14
OKST – Brandon Weeden 2-yard run. (Quinn Sharp kick), 00:27	21–21
3rd quarter
STAN – Zach Ertz 16-yard pass from Andrew Luck. (Jordan Williamson kick), 08:22	STAN 28–21
OKST – Quinn Sharp 19-yard field goal, 05:21	STAN 28–24
4th quarter
STAN – Jordan Williamson 30-yard field goal, 14:16	STAN 31–24
OKST – Justin Blackmon 17-yard pass from Brandon Weeden. (Quinn Sharp kick), 11:53	31–31
STAN – Stepfan Taylor 1-yard run. (Jordan Williamson kick), 04:34	STAN 38–31
OKST – Joseph Randle 4-yard run. (Quinn Sharp kick), 02:35	38–38
Overtime
OKST – Quinn Sharp 22-yard field goal	OKST 41–38

=== Statistics ===
Statistics	STAN	OKST
First downs	27	16
Rushes–yards (net)	50–243	15–65
Passing yards (net)	347	399
Passes, att–comp–int	27–31–1	29–42–1
Total offense, plays – yards	81–590	57–464
Time of possession	41:47	18:13
