= Clint Chelf =

American football quarterback

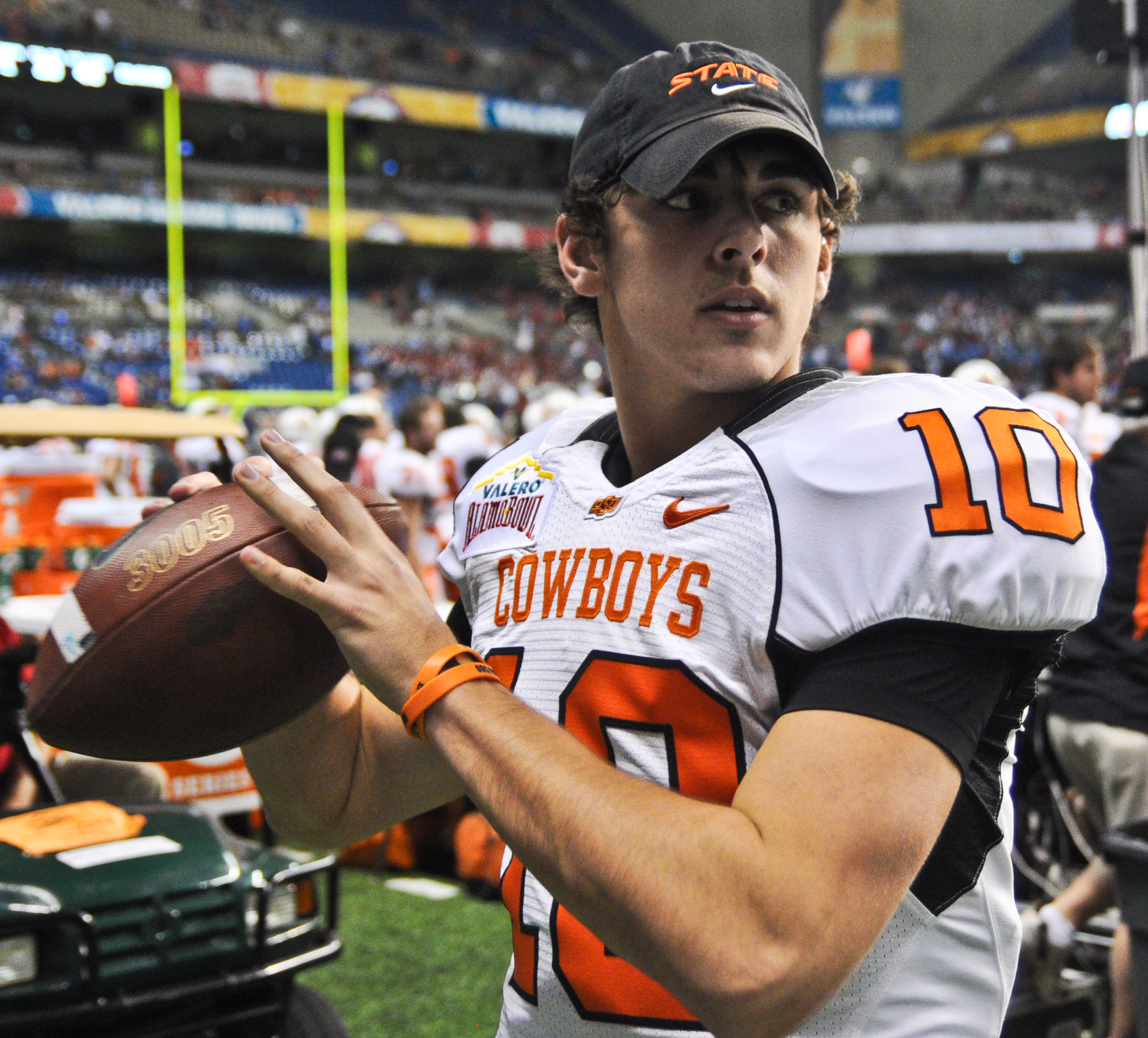
- Chelf in 2010

No. 10
- Position: Quarterback

Personal information
- Listed height: 6 ft 1 in (1.85 m)
- Listed weight: 210 lb (95 kg)

Career information
- High school: Enid (Enid, Oklahoma)
- College: Oklahoma State (2009–2013)
- Stats at ESPN

Clint Chelf is an American former college football quarterback who played for the Oklahoma State Cowboys.

== Early life ==
Chelf attended Enid High School in Enid, Oklahoma. As a senior, he threw for 2,234 yards and 20 touchdowns while also rushing for 734 yards and 11 touchdowns. Originally committed to play college football at Tulsa, Chelf flipped his commitment to Oklahoma State University.

== College career ==
After taking a redshirt in 2009, Chelf playing sparingly as a backup during the 2010 and 2011 seasons. He entered the 2012 season as the third string quarterback behind Wes Lunt and J. W. Walsh. Following injuries, Chelf became the Cowboys' starting quarterback, throwing for 292 yards and four touchdowns in his first career start against West Virginia. In the 2013 Heart of Dallas Bowl, he threw for 197 yards and three touchdowns, leading Oklahoma State to a 58–14 rout of Purdue and being named the game's MVP. Chelf finished his redshirt junior season completing 119 passes for 1,588 yards, 15 touchdowns, and six interceptions. Entering the 2013 season, he competed with Walsh for the starting quarterback position. Chelf earned the start in the season opener against Mississippi State but was benched in favor of Walsh after poor play to start the game. Walsh started the next five games, until he was benched during the game against TCU after throwing two interceptions. Chelf replaced him and started at quarterback for the rest of the season. Against Baylor, he tossed for 370 yards and three touchdowns in a 49–17 victory. In the final game of his collegiate career in the 2014 Cotton Bowl Classic, Chelf threw for a career-high 377 yards with two touchdowns and two interceptions, as the Cowboys lost to Missouri. He finished his final season totaling 2,169 passing yards and 17 touchdowns with eight interceptions.

=== Statistics ===
Season	Team	Games			Passing								Rushing			
Season	Team	GP	GS	Record	Cmp	Att	Pct	Yds	Avg	TD	Int	Rtg	Att	Yds	Avg	TD
2009	Oklahoma State	Redshirted (redshirt)														
2010	Oklahoma State	5	0	0–0	14	19	73.7	213	11.2	2	1	192.1	3	-16	-5.3	0
2011	Oklahoma State	5	0	0–0	20	30	66.7	307	10.2	3	0	185.6	3	-14	-4.7	0
2012	Oklahoma State	8	5	3–2	119	197	60.4	1,588	8.1	15	6	147.2	31	162	5.2	0
2013	Oklahoma State	12	8	6–2	164	291	56.4	2,169	7.5	17	8	132.7	63	369	5.9	7
Career		30	13	9−4	317	537	59.0	4,277	8.0	37	15	143.1	100	501	5.0	7
