= Patrick Higgins (American football) =

American football player and coach (born 1963)

Biographical details
- Born: November 11, 1963 (age 62); Pendleton, New York, U.S.

Playing career
- 1982–1985: William Penn
- Positions: Quarterback, defensive back

Coaching career (HC unless noted)
- 1989: St. Cloud State (WR)
- 1990: Quincy (IL) (OC)
- 1991: Quincy (IL) (DC)
- 1992: William Penn
- 1993: Saint Andrew's School (GA)
- 1994–1996: Shepherd (OC/QB/WR/ST)
- 1997: Columbia (RB)
- 1998–1999: UTEP (WR)
- 2000–2003: UTEP (OC)
- 2004: Louisiana Tech (TE/ST)
- 2005–2010: BYU (OWR/ST)
- 2011–2012: Purdue (WR)
- 2012: Purdue (interim HC)
- 2013–2015: UTEP (OC/QB)
- 2016–2017: Virginia (analyst)

Head coaching record
- Overall: 1–10
- Bowls: 0–1

Patrick Joseph Higgins (born November 11, 1963) is an American football coach and former player. Higgins currently works as an employee with the NCAA with the enforcement football group. He is the former offensive coordinator for the UTEP Miners football team. He was the interim head coach for Purdue University during the 2013 Heart of Dallas Bowl.

== Head coaching record ==
Year	Team	Overall	Conference	Standing	Bowl/playoffs
William Penn Statesmen (Iowa Intercollegiate Athletic Conference) (1992)
1992	William Penn	1–9	1–7	8th	
William Penn:		1–9	1–7		
Purdue Boilermakers (Big Ten Conference) (2012)
2012	Purdue	0–1			L Heart of Dallas
Purdue:		0–1			
Total:		1–10			
