= Isaiah Anderson =

American football player (born 1989)

No. 4
- Position: Wide receiver

Personal information
- Born: December 19, 1989 (age 36); Wichita Falls, Texas
- Listed height: 5 ft 10 in (1.78 m)
- Listed weight: 185 lb (84 kg)

Career information
- High school: Wichita Falls (TX)
- College: Oklahoma State
- NFL draft: 2013: undrafted

Career history
- Oklahoma Defenders (2014)

Awards and highlights
- Alamo Bowl Champion (2010); Fiesta Bowl Champion (2012)

Isaiah Anderson (born December 19, 1989) is an American former football wide receiver. He played college football at the Oklahoma State University.

== College career ==
After redshirting in 2008, Anderson played for the Oklahoma State Cowboys football team from 2009 to 2012. After missing most of the 2012 season due an injury to his hand, Anderson had three touchdown passes of 60, 33 and 66 yards, and compiled a career-high 174 receiving yards in a 59–21 victory over Texas Tech on November 17, 2012.

== Professional career ==
On November 26, 2013, Anderson was signed by the Oklahoma Defenders of the Champions Professional Indoor Football League for their upcoming season set to commence in March, 2014.

== Personal life ==
Anderson majored in secondary education at Oklahoma State University. Anderson is the father of two sons and a daughter.
