= Josh Stewart (American football) =

American football player (born 1992)

No. 18
- Position: Wide receiver

Personal information
- Born: October 22, 1992 (age 34); New Orleans, Louisiana, U.S.
- Listed height: 5 ft 11 in (1.80 m)
- Listed weight: 185 lb (84 kg)

Career information
- High school: Denton (TX) John H. Guyer
- College: Oklahoma State
- NFL draft: 2014: undrafted

Career history
- Tennessee Titans (2014); Wichita Falls Nighthawks (2017); Spokane Shock (2020–2021)

Awards and highlights
- First-team All-Big 12 (2012); Second-team All-Big 12 (2013)
- Stats at Pro Football Reference

Josh Stewart (born October 22, 1992) is an American former football wide receiver. He played college football at Oklahoma State.

== Early life ==
Stewart attended John H. Guyer High School in Denton, Texas with future college teammates Jimmy Bean and J.W. Walsh. Originally committed to Texas A&M, he switched to Oklahoma State Cowboys in 2011.

== College career ==
As a freshman in 2011, Stewart was a wide receiver and kick returner. He caught 18 passes for an average of 15.3 yards per catch. He had 261 kickoff return yards for an average of 20.1 per carry. In his sophomore year, he had 101 receptions (an average of 7.8 per game, third-best in the Big 12 Conference).

After his junior season, he announced he would forgo his remaining eligibility and enter the 2014 NFL draft.

Career rushing/receiving stats
Year	Team	G	Rush	Yds	Yd/Rush	TDs	Rec	Yds	Yd/Rec	TDs
2011	OSU	13	0	0	-	0	19	291	15.3	2
2012	OSU	13	8	120	15.0	1	101	1210	12.0	7
2013	OSU	12	10	49	4.9	0	60	707	11.8	3
Career		38	18	169	9.4	1	180	2208	12.3	12

Career returning stats
Year	Team	G	Punt Returns	Yds	Avg	TDs	Kick Returns	Yds	Avg	TDs
2011	OSU	13	1	-3	-3.0	0	13	261	20.1	0
2012	OSU	13	2	73	36.5	0	0	0	-	0
2013	OSU	12	22	368	16.7	2	1	24	24.0	0
Career		38	25	438	17.5	2	14	285	20.4	0

== Professional career ==
Stewart went undrafted in the 2014 NFL Draft.

=== Tennessee Titans ===
Stewart was signed as an undrafted free agent on May 12, 2014. 24 days later, on June 5, he suffered a serious Achilles tendon injury and was subsequently placed on waivers.

=== Wichita Falls Nighthawks ===
On September 6, 2016, Stewart signed with the Wichita Falls Nighthawks for the 2017 season. He was released on February 16, 2017. On April 27, 2017, Stewart was re-signed by the Nighthawks.
