= Quinn Sharp =

American football player (born 1989)

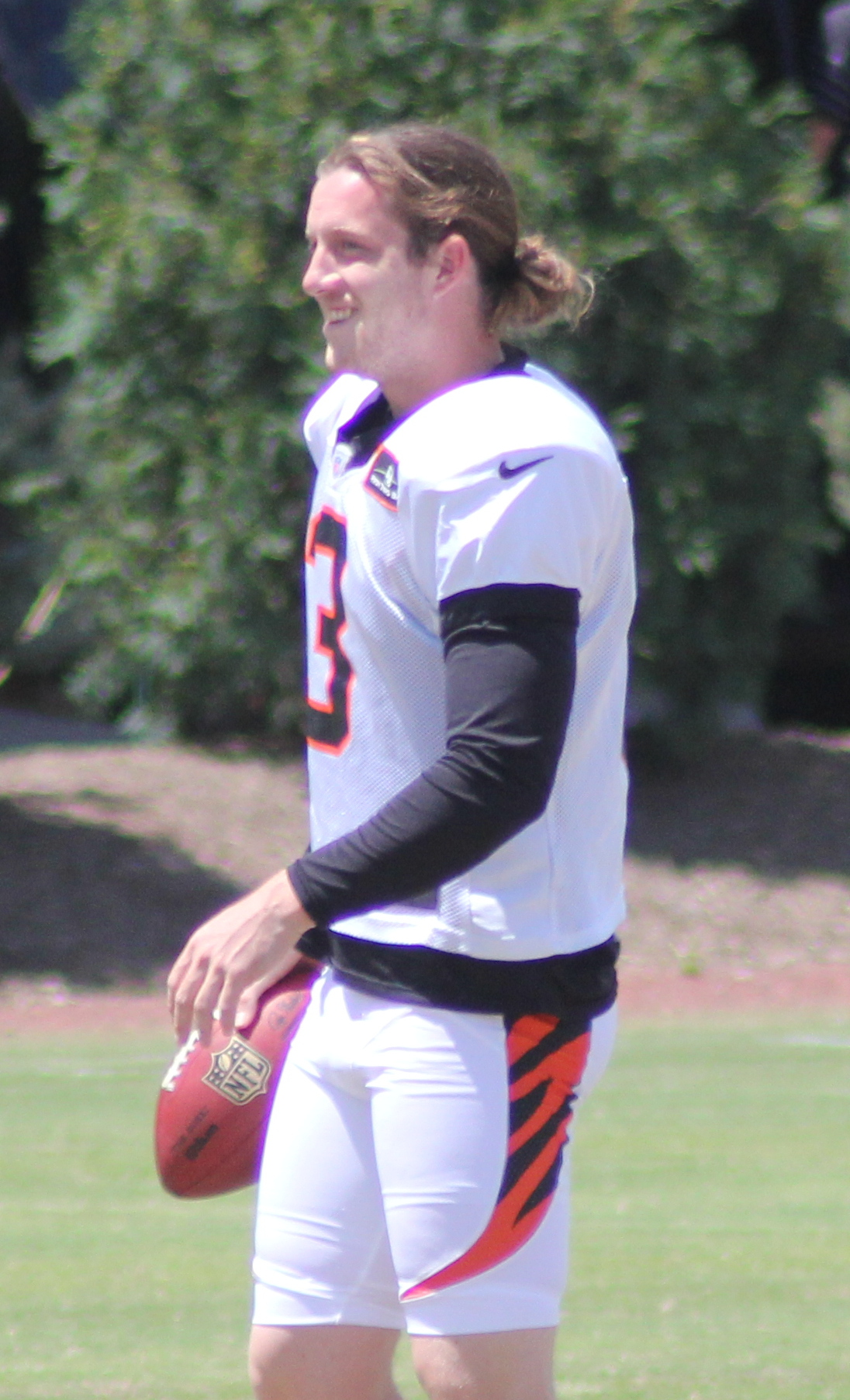
- Sharp with the Cincinnati Bengals in 2013

No. 14
- Positions: Placekicker, punter

Personal information
- Born: November 12, 1989 (age 36); Grapevine, Texas, U.S.
- Listed height: 6 ft 1 in (1.85 m)
- Listed weight: 189 lb (86 kg)

Career information
- High school: Mansfield (TX) Summit
- College: Oklahoma State
- NFL draft: 2013: undrafted

Career history
- Cincinnati Bengals (2013)*; Toronto Argonauts (2013); Cincinnati Bengals (2014)*; Saskatchewan Roughriders (2014)*
- * Offseason or practice squad member only

Awards and highlights
- 2× First-team All-American (2010, 2011); 2× Big 12 Special Teams Player of the Year (2011, 2012); 3× First-team All-Big 12 (2010, 2011, 2012)
- Stats at Pro Football Reference

Quinn Sharp (born November 12, 1989) is an American former football player. He played college football for the Oklahoma State Cowboys.

== Early life ==
Sharp played football and baseball at Mansfield Summit High School in Arlington, Texas.

== College career ==
After taking a redshirt year in 2008 (as he did on purpose), Sharp took over as the starting punter for the Oklahoma State Cowboys. He earned mid-season freshman All-America honors from Rivals.com in 2009. In the Cotton Bowl, he averaged over 50 yards per punt, including one 63 yarder. He would eventually take over both kickoff & placekicking duties for Oklahoma State in his junior season.

Sharp became one of the nation's premier kickers in 2012 as he led the country in field goals made. He converted 28 of 34 attempts on the season, which is the most successful kicks in a single season in program history and tied for 13th in FBS history.

During the 2012 season, Sharp was named Big 12 Special Teams Player of the Week twice for his performances against Kansas and TCU. He knocked in field goals from 42 and 49 yards that were the difference in OSU's 20-14 win over the Jayhawks, while blasting three punts over 50 yards, including a 73-yarder. Two weeks later in the victory over TCU, Sharp converted on all five field goal attempts from lengths of 22, 34, 30, 32 and 27, tying a program record for field goals in a single game.

Sharp was automatic on short attempts throughout the season going 19-of-19 on kicks inside 40 yards. He also went a perfect 72-for-72 on extra point attempts. He was named a semifinalist for the Lou Groza award, which honors the nation's top kicker.

He would finish his 4 year collegiate career as the NCAA punting yards per punt career leader with a 45.9 yard average per punt over 204 career punts. As of 2023 his career average still sits at 11th.

== Professional career ==
Sharp entered the 2013 NFL draft where he wasn't chosen but later came to terms with the Cincinnati Bengals. On August 25, Sharp was cut from Cincinnati.

On October 27, 2013, Sharp signed with the Toronto Argonauts of the Canadian Football League (CFL). After playing in one game with the Argonauts, he was released by the team on November 7, 2013.

He was signed to the practice roster of the CFL's Saskatchewan Roughriders on October 8, 2014.
