= J. W. Walsh =

American football player and coach (born 1992)

Current position
- Title: Offensive analyst
- Team: Purdue
- Record: Big Ten

Biographical details
- Born: June 29, 1992 (age 34); Houston, Texas, U.S.

Playing career
- 2011–2015: Oklahoma State
- Position: Quarterback

Coaching career (HC unless noted)
- 2016: TCU (GA)
- 2017–2019: Abilene Christian (RB)
- 2020: Texas (OA)
- 2021–2025: Oklahoma State (OQC)
- 2026–present: Purdue (OA)

Accomplishments and honors

Awards
- Big 12 Offensive Freshman of the Year (2012)

J. W. Walsh (born June 29, 1992) is an American football coach and former player. He played quarterback for the Oklahoma State Cowboys from 2011 to 2015.

== Early life ==
Walsh played at Guyer High School in Denton, Texas, where he was coached by his father John and reached the University Interscholastic League state finals his senior year.

== College career ==
Walsh was redshirted as a true freshman in 2011. In 2012, Walsh battled Clint Chelf and true freshman Wes Lunt for the starting quarterback job. Lunt won the quarterback derby and Walsh was named the backup. Lunt suffered a knee/ankle injury in the game against Louisiana–Lafayette on September 15. Walsh stepped in and started the next three games before suffering a knee injury against Iowa State on October 20. The injury was later revealed to be a fractured knee. The injury announcement came as a surprise as Walsh apparently suffered the injury in the first quarter, but he was able to play the entire game and finished with 415 passing yards and 46 rushing yards. The injury was expected to sideline Walsh for the rest of the season, but he was able to return only a few weeks later. He was able to suit up for the last four games of the season and backed up Chelf, who started the final five games of the season at quarterback. Walsh finished the season with 1,564 passing yards, 13 touchdowns against three interceptions, and completed 66.9 percent of his passes. He was named the Big 12 Offensive Freshman of the Year by conference coaches.

In 2013, Walsh and Chelf battled for the starting quarterback spot, after Lunt decided to transfer to Illinois. On August 22, Oklahoma State head coach Mike Gundy announced that both Walsh and Chelf would play in the season opener against Mississippi State on August 31. Chelf was named the starter of the Mississippi State game only minutes before kickoff. He engineered two ineffective drives to start the game, before being replaced by Walsh, who played the rest of the game at quarterback. Oklahoma State won the game 21–3 and Walsh finished the game with 135 passing yards, 125 rushing yards, and completed 18-of-27 passes. After the game, Gundy announced that Walsh would be the starting quarterback going forward. Walsh started the next five games, until he was benched during the game against TCU after throwing two interceptions. He was replaced by Chelf, who started at quarterback for the rest of the season.

In 2014, Walsh started the first two games of the season. In the second game of the season against Missouri State, Walsh was knocked out of the game with a right foot injury. The injury required surgical repair and Walsh would miss the remainder of the season. In January 2015, Gundy named Mason Rudolph the starting quarterback going into the 2015 season.

With Rudolph as the unquestioned starting quarterback, Walsh entered the 2015 season as the backup quarterback. The coaches designed a package of plays specifically for Walsh and by fall practice, it became clear that Walsh would have a role in the offense. While Rudolph was the starter and would take the majority of snaps at quarterback, Walsh would enter the game at quarterback in short-yardage third and fourth down situations, and red-zone situations throughout the season. In the first ten games of the season, Walsh racked up 10 passing and 10 rushing touchdowns. Walsh started the regular season finale against Oklahoma in place of Rudolph, who suffered a foot injury against Baylor on November 21.

== Coaching career ==
On January 19, 2016, it was reported that Walsh would be joining the TCU coaching staff as an offensive graduate assistant.

On December 21, 2016, it was reported that Walsh would be joining the staff at Abilene Christian University for the 2017 season as the Running Backs coach.

On March 10, 2020, it was reported that Walsh would be joining the staff at The University of Texas at Austin for the 2020 season as an offensive analyst.

On January 15, 2021, it was announced that Walsh would be returning to his alma mater, Oklahoma State University, to join the staff as a Quality Control coach working directly under Quarterbacks coach Tim Rattay.
