= 2011 Texas Tech Red Raiders football team =

American college football season

2011 Texas Tech Red Raiders football
- Conference: Big 12 Conference
- Record: 5–7 (2–7 Big 12)
- Head coach: Tommy Tuberville (2nd season)
- Offensive coordinator: Neal Brown (2nd season)
- Offensive scheme: Air raid
- Defensive coordinator: Chad Glasgow (1st season)
- Base defense: 4–2–5
- Home stadium: Jones AT&T Stadium

2011 Big 12 Conference football standings
| | Conf. | | | Overall |
| Team | W | | L | W | | L |
|---|---|---|---|---|---|---|
| No. 3 Oklahoma State $ | 8 | – | 1 | 12 | – | 1 |
| No. 15 Kansas State | 7 | – | 2 | 10 | – | 3 |
| No. 13 Baylor | 6 | – | 3 | 10 | – | 3 |
| No. 16 Oklahoma | 6 | – | 3 | 10 | – | 3 |
| Missouri | 5 | – | 4 | 8 | – | 5 |
| Texas | 4 | – | 5 | 8 | – | 5 |
| Texas A&M | 4 | – | 5 | 7 | – | 6 |
| Iowa State | 3 | – | 6 | 6 | – | 7 |
| Texas Tech | 2 | – | 7 | 5 | – | 7 |
| Kansas | 0 | – | 9 | 2 | – | 10 |
$ – BCS representative as conference champion; Rankings from AP Poll

The 2011 Texas Tech Red Raiders football team represented Texas Tech University as a member of the Big 12 Conference during the 2011 NCAA Division I FBS football season. Led by second-year by head coach Tommy Tuberville, the Red Raiders compiled an overall record of 5–7 with a mark of 2–7 in conference play, placing ninth in the Big 12. 2011 was the first losing season for Texas Tech since the 1992 season and the Red Raiders failed to qualify for a bowl game for the first time since the 1999 season. The team played home games at Jones AT&T Stadium in Lubbock, Texas.

Texas Tech started the season 4–0 before losing two close games to No. 24 Texas A&M and No. 17 Kansas State. The Red Raiders then beat No. 3 Oklahoma, 41–38, improving to 5–2 and entering the AP Poll at No. 19. The team lost their final five games, four by at least 24 points, including a 66–6 loss to No. 2 Oklahoma State.

Defensive coordinator Chad Glasgow and Texas Tech mutually agreed to part ways following the season. The team's defense ranked 117th in points allowed per game, allowing an average of 39.25.

== Schedule ==
| Date | Time | Opponent | Rank | Site | TV | Result | Attendance |
|---|---|---|---|---|---|---|---|
| September 3 | 6:00 pm | Texas State* | | Jones AT&T Stadium; Lubbock, TX | | W 50–10 | 51,792 |
| September 17 | 2:30 pm | at New Mexico* | | University Stadium; Albuquerque, NM | Versus | W 59–13 | 20,674 |
| September 24 | 6:00 pm | Nevada* | | Jones AT&T Stadium; Lubbock, TX | FCS Central | W 35–34 | 55,664 |
| October 1 | 12:00 pm | at Kansas | | Memorial Stadium; Lawrence, KS | FSN | W 45–34 | 39,621 |
| October 8 | 6:00 pm | No. 24 Texas A&M | | Jones AT&T Stadium; Lubbock, TX (rivalry) | FX | L 40–45 | 58,416 |
| October 15 | 6:00 pm | No. 17 Kansas State^{†} | | Jones AT&T Stadium; Lubbock, TX | FSN | L 34–41 | 49,744 |
| October 22 | 8:45 pm^{A} | at No. 3 Oklahoma | | Gaylord Family Oklahoma Memorial Stadium; Norman, OK | ABC/ESPN2 | W 41–38 | 85,204 |
| October 29 | 6:00 pm | Iowa State | No. 19 | Jones AT&T Stadium; Lubbock, TX | FSN | L 7–41 | 59,260 |
| November 5 | 12:00 pm | at Texas | | Darrell K Royal–Texas Memorial Stadium; Austin, TX (rivalry) | FX | L 20–52 | 100,506 |
| November 12 | 11:00 am | No. 2 Oklahoma State | | Jones AT&T Stadium; Lubbock, TX | ABC | L 6–66 | 59,059 |
| November 19 | 2:30 pm | at Missouri | | Faurot Field; Columbia, MO | ABC/ESPN2 | L 27–31 | 54,309 |
| November 26 | 6:00 pm | vs. No. 21 Baylor | | Cowboys Stadium; Arlington, TX (rivalry) | FSN | L 42–66 | 51,615 |
*Non-conference game; ^{†}Homecoming; Rankings from AP Poll released prior to the game; All times are in Central time

- ^A Kickoff was originally scheduled for 7:00 p.m., but was delayed due to lightning and rain showers.

== Rankings ==
Ranking movements Legend: ██ Increase in ranking ██ Decrease in ranking — = Not ranked RV = Received votes
| | Week | | | | | | | | | | | | | | | |
| Poll | Pre | 1 | 2 | 3 | 4 | 5 | 6 | 7 | 8 | 9 | 10 | 11 | 12 | 13 | 14 | Final |
|---|---|---|---|---|---|---|---|---|---|---|---|---|---|---|---|---|
| AP | — | — | — | — | — | RV | RV | — | 19 | — | — | — | — | — | — | — |
| Coaches | — | RV | — | RV | RV | RV | RV | — | 22 | — | — | — | — | — | — | — |
| Harris | Not released | | | | | | RV | RV | 21 | RV | — | — | — | — | — | Not released |
| BCS | Not released | | | | | | | — | 20 | — | — | — | — | — | — | Not released |

== Roster ==
2011 Texas Tech Red Raiders Football
| Quarterbacks: 3 Jacob Karam – (redshirt) Sophomore; 7 Seth Doege – Junior; 12 Brant Costilla – Sophomore; 15 Scotty Young – (redshirt) Freshman; 16 Michael Brewer – Freshman; Running backs: 10 Harrison Jeffers – Junior; 20 Ronnie Daniels – Freshman; 21 DeAndré Washington – Freshman; 24 Eric Stephens – Junior; 32 Aaron Crawford – Senior; 34 Kenny Williams – Freshman; 38 Dondetrick Barnes – Freshman; 39 Josh Talbot – (redshirt) Sophomore; Fullbacks: 33 Omar Ontiveros – Sophomore; Wide receivers: 2 Cornelius Douglas – Junior; 4 Bradley Marquez – Freshman; 6 Austin Zouzalik – Junior; 8 Jacoby Franks – Senior; 10 Pete Robertson – Freshman; 11 Tramain Swindall – Senior; 13 Jakeem Grant – Freshman; 14 Darrin Moore – Junior; 17 Javares McRoy – Freshman; 18 Eric Ward – (redshirt) Sophomore; 19 Derek Edwards – Freshman; 25 Trey Ozee – Freshman; 27 Brad Pearson – Freshman; 28 Brent Mitcham – Freshman; 80 Jason Sabolboro – Sophomore; 82 Adam James – Senior; 83 Tyson Williams – Junior; 85 Jordan Davis – Sophomore; 86 Alex Torres – Junior; 87 Aaron Fisher – (redshirt) Sophomore; 88 Marcus Kennard – Junior; Tight ends: 22 Jace Amaro – Freshman; 23 Ben McRoy – Sophomore; 38 Summit Hogue – Freshman | Offensive linemen: 56 Alfredo Morales – Freshman; 60 Michael Wells – Freshman; 61 Jonathan Guerra – Senior; 62 David Neil – Senior; 63 James Polk – Freshman; 65 Laadrian Waddle – Junior; 66 Deveric Gallington – Junior; 67 – Matt Wilson – Freshman; 68 Terry McDaniel – Junior; 70 Tony Morales – Freshman; 71 Kyle Clark – (redshirt) Sophomore; 72 Beau Carpenter – (redshirt) Freshman; 73 Justin Keown – Senior; 74 Mickey Okafor – Senior; 77 Le'Raven Clark – Freshman; 78 Lonnie Edwards – Senior; Defensive ends: 11 Leon Mackey – Junior; 40 Audrey Barr – (redshirt) Sophomore; 43 Jackson Richards – Freshman; 46 Christopher Knighton – (redshirt) Sophomore; 52 Kindred Evans – Freshman; 54 Dartwan Bush – Sophomore; 79 Edward Johnson – Sophomore; 91 Kerry Hyder – (redshirt) Sophomore; 94 Scott Smith – Senior; Defensive tackles: 8 Delvon Simmons – Freshman; 97 Donte Phillips – Freshman; 98 Donald Langley – Senior; 99 Chris Perry – Senior; Placekickers: 45 Kramer Fyfe – (redshirt) Freshman; 48 Ryan Bustin – Sophomore; 49 Donnie Carona – Senior; 84 Bradley Hicks – (redshirt) Senior; Punters: 26 Ryan Erxleben – (redshirt) Freshman; Long snappers: 47 Jesse Smitherman – Senior; 52 Alex Chester – (redshirt) Freshman; 57 David Brenner – Freshman | Linebackers: 13 Sam Eguavoen – Freshman; 15 Justin Cooper – Freshman; 23 Dion Chidozie – (redshirt) Sophomore; 25 Blake Dees – Freshman; 27 Zach Winbush – Sophomore; 39 Tanner Foster – Junior; 42 Daniel Cobb – (redshirt) Sophomore; 45 Tyrone Sonier – Senior; 51 Cqulin Hubert – Sophomore; 90 Branden Jackson – Freshman; Cornerbacks: 3 Urell Johnson – (redshirt) Freshman; 4 Derrick Mays – (redshirt) Sophomore; 5 Tre' Porter – Sophomore; 21 Jarvis Phillips – (redshirt) Sophomore; 28 Happiness Osunde – Junior; 31 Eugene Neboh – Junior; 33 J.J. Gaines – Freshman; 34 Sawyer Vest – Senior; Defensive backs: 19 Giorgio Durham – (redshirt) Junior; 22 Jared Flannel – Senior; 47 Leland Gupton – Freshman; 49 Donte Floyd – Sophomore; Safeties: 1 Terrance Bullit – (redshirt) Sophomore; 12 D.J. Johnson – Junior; 14 Desmond Martin – Freshman; 16 Cody Davis – Junior; 26 John White – Freshman; 29 Russell Polk – (redshirt) Freshman; 30 Brett Dewhurst – Senior; 32 Blake Gower – Freshman; 37 Chris Yeakey – Junior |

== Game summaries ==
=== Texas State ===
Texas State Bobcats at Texas Tech Red Raiders – Game summary

| Quarter | 1 | 2 | 3 | 4 | Total |
|---|---|---|---|---|---|
| Bobcats | 10 | 0 | 0 | 0 | 10 |
| Red Raiders | 9 | 0 | 20 | 21 | 50 |

at Jones AT&T Stadium, Lubbock, Texas

- Date: September 3
- Game time: 6:00 p.m. CDT
- Game weather: Temperature: 92 °F (33 °C) • Weather: partly cloudy • Wind: ENE 8 MPH
- Game attendance: 51,792
- Referee: Matt Loeffler

Game information

First quarter

- TXST – Will Johnson 40-yard field goal, 6:30. Bobcats 3–0. Drive: 11 plays, 45 yards, 6:10.
- TXST – Marcus Curry 7-yard run (Will Johnson kick), 1:36. Bobcats 10–0. Drive: 9 plays, 41 yards, 3:35.
- TTU – Bradley Marquez 10-yard pass from Seth Doege (Donnie Carona kick), 0:53. Bobcats 10–7. Drive: 3 plays, 60 yards, 0:43.
- TTU – Shaun Rutherford penalized in end zone, 0:46. Bobcats 10–9.

Second quarter

- No scoring plays

Third quarter

- TTU – Darrin Moore 20-yard pass from Seth Doege (pass failed), 7:22. Red Raiders 15–10. Drive: 12 plays, 84 yards, 3:30.
- TTU – Eric Stephens 46-yard run (Donnie Carona kick), 1:39. Red Raiders 22–10. Drive: 5 plays, 92 yards, 1:40.
- TTU – Eric Stephens 2-yard run (Donnie Carona kick), 0:00. Red Raiders 29–10. Drive: 4 plays, 36 yards, 1:26.

Fourth quarter

- TTU – Tramain Swindall 20-yard pass from Seth Doege (Donnie Carona kick), 11:54. Red Raiders 36–10. Drive: 7 plays, 88 yards, 2:00.
- TTU – DeAndré Washington 23-yard run (Donnie Carona kick), 5:55. Red Raiders 43–10. Drive: 2 plays, 23 yards, 0:15.
- TTU – Eric Ward 3-yard pass from Jacob Karam (Donnie Carona kick), 3:27. Red Raiders 50–10. Drive: 3 plays, 27 yards, 0:36.

Top passers

- TXST – Shaun Rutherford – 5/12, 38 yards
- TTU – Seth Doege – 24/34, 331 yards, 3 TD

Top rushers

- TXST – Shaun Rutherford – 12 rushes, 82 yards
- TTU – Eric Stephens – 20 rushes, 113 yards, 2 TD

Top receivers

- TXST – Isaiah Battle – 2 receptions, 27 yards
- TTU – Darrin Moore – 12 receptions, 221 yards, TD

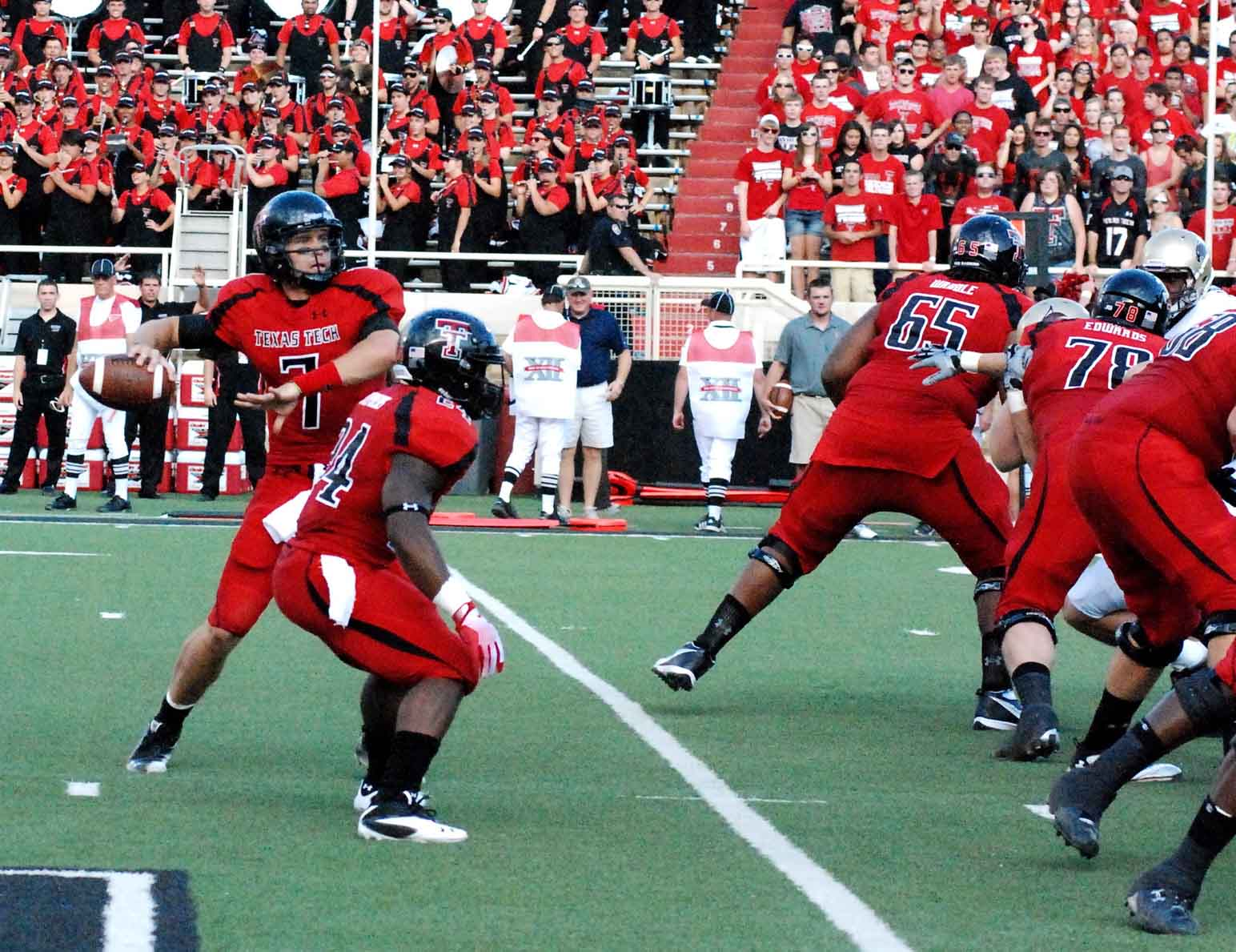
Quarterback Seth Doege drops back to pass during Texas Tech's season-opening win over Texas State.

The Red Raiders opened their 2011 season at home against the Texas State Bobcats, marking the 950th overall contest in the program's 86-year history. Texas Tech won the coin toss and elected to receive. Their first drive would end in a punt by Ryan Erxleben from their own 26 yard line. The first score of the game came by way of a 40-yard Texas State field goal by Will Johnson on their first drive. On the next drive the Red Raiders fumbled the ball on their own 41 yard. Texas State capitalized on this turnover with a rushing touchdown by Marcus Curry. The Bobcats' Will Johnson kicked the extra point, to bring the score to 10–0. The Red Raiders' first score of the 2011 season came on their next drive, in which Seth Doege completed a 41-yard pass to Darrin Moore and another 10 yard pass to true freshman Bradley Marquez for the touchdown. Donnie Carona successfully converted the extra point for a score of 10–7. On the kickoff following the touchdown, the Bobcats' Shaun Rutherford was tripped up by his own defender and fell at his own 1 yard line. On the next play, Bobcats' quarterback Shaun Rutherford was penalized for intentional grounding which resulted in safety giving the Red Raiders' two more points and the ball back. Neither team would score during the remainder of the first half, and at halftime the Red Raiders trailed 10–9.

The Red Raiders dominated the second half, shutting out the Bobcats. In the third quarter the Red Raiders scored three touchdowns, the first on a 20-yard pass from Seth Doege to Darrin Moore. Following the first touchdown, Texas Tech unsuccessfully attempted a two–point conversion but held their first lead at 15–10. The second score of the third quarter came on the Red Raiders' next drive when Eric Stephens ran 46 yards for a touchdown. Donnie Carona added the extra point to bring the score to 22–10. On Texas State's next possession, the Bobcats fumbled on their own 36 yard line. The Red Raiders capitalized on the fumble with an Eric Stephens 2 yard rushing touchdown four plays later. Donnie Carona converted the extra point. That drive was the last of the third quarter, and brought the score to 29–10.

The fourth quarter scoring again consisted of three Red Raider touchdowns. The first was a 20-yard pass by Seth Doege to Tramain Swindall, during their first drive of the quarter. The second score came four drives later, when DeAndre Washington ran 23 yards for a touchdown. The final touchdown of the game came on the next Red Raider drive with 3 yard pass to Eric Ward from backup quarterback Jacob Karam. Donnie Carona successfully converted each of the three extra point attempts during the fourth quarter. The final score was 50–10.

=== At New Mexico ===
Texas Tech Red Raiders at New Mexico Lobos – Game summary

| Quarter | 1 | 2 | 3 | 4 | Total |
|---|---|---|---|---|---|
| Red Raiders | 14 | 24 | 14 | 7 | 59 |
| Lobos | 0 | 7 | 0 | 6 | 13 |

at University Stadium, Albuquerque, New Mexico

- Date: September 17
- Game time: 2:30 p.m. CDT / 1:30 p.m. MDT
- Game weather: Temperature: 75 °F (24 °C) • Weather: cloudy • Wind: SE 4 MPH
- Game attendance: 20,674
- Referee: Dan Romeo
- TV announcers (Versus): Paul Burmeister (Play-by-play), Shaun King (Color) & Anthony Herron (Sideline)

Game information

First quarter

- TTU – Darrin Moore 59-yard pass from Seth Doege (Donnie Carona kick), 13:33. Red Raiders 7–0. Drive: 4 plays, 72 yards, 1:27.
- TTU – Darrin Moore 7-yard pass from Seth Doege (Donnie Carona kick), 9:57. Red Raiders 14–0. Drive: 5 plays, 44 yards, 1:26.

Second quarter

- TTU – Eric Ward 1-yard pass from Seth Doege (Donnie Carona kick), 14:24. Red Raiders 21–0. Drive: 17 plays, 92 yards, 6:38.
- TTU – Darrin Moore 26-yard pass from Austin Zouzalik (Donnie Carona kick), 10:35. Red Raiders 28–0. Drive: 5 plays, 77 yards, 2:12.
- UNM – Crusoe Gongbay 2-yard run (James Aho kick), 7:56. Red Raiders 28–7. Drive: 7 plays, 80 yards, 2:38.
- TTU – Eric Stephens 4–yard run (Donnie Carona kick), 2:25. Red Raiders 35–7. Drive: 6 plays, 25 yards, 2:20.
- TTU – Donnie Carona 23-yard field goal, 0:00. Red Raiders 38–7. Drive: 6 plays, 60 yards, 0:48.

Third quarter

- TTU – Eric Ward 11-yard pass from Seth Doege (Donnie Carona kick), 10:25. Red Raiders 45–7. Drive: 7 plays, 42 yards, 2:48.
- TTU – Jace Amaro 2-yard pass from Seth Doege (Donnie Carona kick), 1:18. Red Raiders 52–7. Drive: 12 plays, 95 yards, 5:06.

Fourth quarter

- TTU – Ronnie Daniels 9-yard run (Donnie Carona kick), 12:41. Red Raiders 59–7. Drive: 8 plays, 55 yards, 3:06.
- UNM – James Aho 44-yard field goal, 7:42. Red Raiders 59–10. Drive: 8 plays, 30 yards, 3:57.
- UNM – James Aho 42-yard field goal, 1:40. Red Raiders 59–13. Drive: 8 plays, 47 yards, 3:31.

Top passers

- TTU – Seth Doege – 40/44, 401 yards, 5 TD
- UNM – Tarean Austin – 8/24, 187 yards, INT

Top rushers

- TTU – Eric Stephens – 14 rushes, 92 yards, TD
- UNM – Crusoe Gongbay – 14 rushes, 61 yards, TD

Top receivers

- TTU – Darrin Moore – 9 receptions, 118 yards, 3 TD
- UNM – Deon Long – 3 receptions, 139 yards

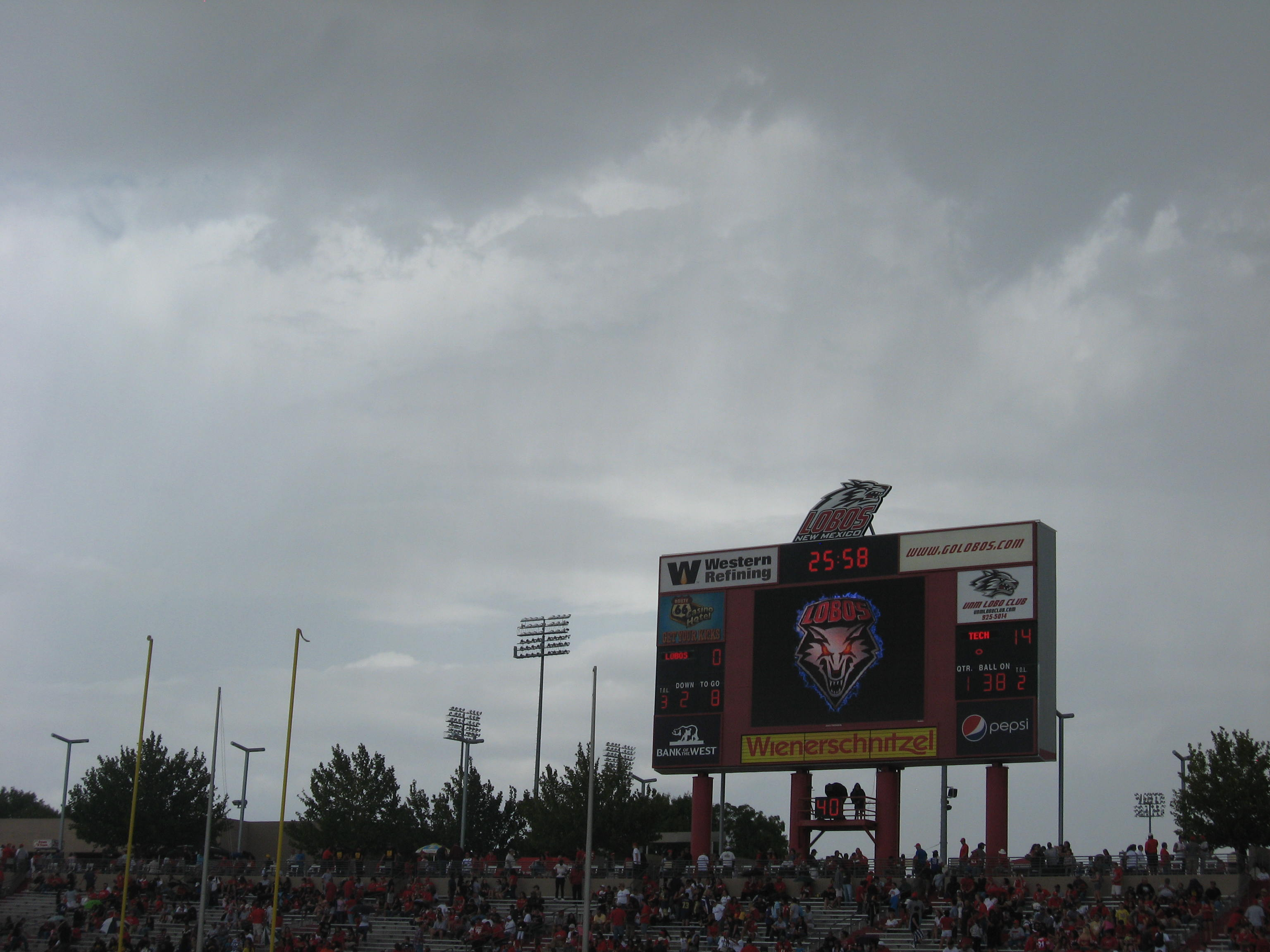
Clouds and scoreboard during first lightning delay

After a bye weekend on September 10, Texas Tech faced New Mexico on the road in Albuquerque on September 17. The Red Raiders fielded a young team, especially on defense, with true freshmen Blake Dees and Sam Equavoen getting their first starting assignments at linebacker, and redshirt Jackson Richards starting at defensive end. Texas Tech came into the game with a 35–6–2 all-time record against New Mexico.

Despite two weather delays in the game caused by lightning strikes nearby, the Red Raiders rolled to a 59–13 rout of the Lobos. Texas Tech quarterback Seth Doege tied a school record by completing all 15 of his first 15 passes. Overall, he finished 40 for 44, a 90.9 completion percentage, setting an NCAA record for quarterbacks with at least 40 completions in a game. The former record, 49 for 59 (83%), was held by Red Raider Kliff Kingsbury.

Doege connected on a pair of first-quarter touchdown passes to Darrin Moore as the Red Raiders jumped out to a 14–0 lead. Doege hit Eric Ward on a 1-yard touchdown pass early in the second quarter, and wide receiver Austin Zouzalik threw a touchdown pass to Darrin Moore as Texas Tech increased its lead to 28–0. Texas Tech's lead was 38–7 at halftime. Texas Tech's domination continued in the third quarter as Doege threw scoring passes to Ward and tight end Jace Amaro. Texas Tech's final touchdown in the fourth quarter came as true freshman Ronnie Daniels, a graduate of Albuquerque's La Cueva High School, ran in the ball from nine yards out. For his performance in the game, Doege was nominated for the Capital One Impact Performance award. He was also nominated for and won the AT&T ESPN All-America Player of the Week award. Doege was named the Big 12 Conference Co-offensive Player of the Week for his record performance, sharing the honor with Missouri running back Henry Josey.

=== Nevada ===
Nevada Wolf Pack at Texas Tech Red Raiders – Game summary

| Quarter | 1 | 2 | 3 | 4 | Total |
|---|---|---|---|---|---|
| Wolf Pack | 0 | 14 | 14 | 6 | 34 |
| Red Raiders | 0 | 7 | 14 | 14 | 35 |

at Jones AT&T Stadium, Lubbock, Texas

- Date: September 11
- Game time: 6:00 p.m. CDT
- Game weather: Temperature: 93 °F (34 °C) • Weather: clear • Wind: W 13 MPH
- Game attendance: 55,664
- Referee: Robert Cameron
- TV announcers (FCS Central): Tom Helmer (Play-by-play), Yogi Roth (Color) & Desmond Purnell (Sideline)

Game information

First quarter

- No scoring plays

Second quarter

- TTU – Eric Ward 2-yard pass from Seth Doege (Donnie Carona kick), 9:32. Red Raiders 7–0. Drive: 12 plays, 80 yards, 4:46.
- NEV – Cody Fajardo 6-yard run (Anthony Martinez kick), 5:18. Tied 7–7. Drive: 9 plays, 83 yards, 4:14.
- NEV – Kolby Arendse 16-yard pass from Cody Fajardo (Anthony Martinez kick), 0:35. Wolf Pack 14–7. Drive: 7 plays, 91 yards, 3:35.

Third quarter

- NEV – Rishard Matthews 2-yard pass from Tyler Lantrip (Anthony Martinez kick), 11:39. Wolf Pack 21–7. Drive: 7 plays, 80 yards, 3:21.
- TTU – Eric Stephens 10-yard run (Donnie Carona kick), 8:22. Wolf Pack 21–14. Drive: 9 plays, 69 yards, 3:17.
- NEV – Cody Fajardo 56-yard run (Anthony Martinez kick), 5:29. Wolf Pack 28–14. Drive: 1 play, 51 yards, 0:10.
- TTU – Jace Amaro 8-yard pass from Seth Doege (Donnie Carona kick), 4:12. Wolf Pack 28–21. Drive: 3 plays, 63 yards, 1:17.

Fourth quarter

- NEV – Anthony Martinez 25-yard field goal, 13:00. Wolf Pack 31–21. Drive: 11 plays, 63 yards, 6:12.
- TTU – Eric Stephens 1-yard run (Donnie Carona kick), 9:39. Wolf Pack 31–28. Drive: 10 plays, 63 yards, 3:21.
- NEV – Anthony Martinez 21-yard field goal, 4:49. Wolf Pack 34–28. Drive: 11 plays, 79 yards, 4:50.
- TTU – Eric Ward 4-yard pass from Seth Doege (Donnie Carona kick), 0:36. Red Raiders 35–34. Drive: 9 plays, 56 yards, 4:13.

Top passers

- NEV – Tyler Lantrip – 11/18, 191 yards, TD
- TTU – Seth Doege – 26/38, 222 yards, 3 TD

Top rushers

- NEV – Cody Fajardo – 10 rushes, 139 yards, 2 TD
- TTU – Eric Stephens – 26 rushes, 134 yards, 2 TD

Top receivers

- NEV – Rishard Matthews – 5 receptions, 107 yards, TD
- TTU – Jacoby Franks – 5 receptions, 54 yards

Seth Doege rallied the Red Raiders from a two-score third quarter deficit to win 35–34 with the game-winning touchdown toss to Eric Ward with 36 seconds left. Wolf Pack quarterback Cody Fajardo broke loose for a 56-yard touchdown to give Nevada a 28–14 lead over the Red Raiders with 5:29 remaining in the third quarter, but Texas Tech's defense held Nevada to a pair of field goals in the fourth quarter as the Red Raiders mounted their comeback. Trailing 34–28, the Red Raiders got the ball with less than 5 minutes remaining and drove 56 yards in 9 plays for the winning score. Doege connected with Ward on a fourth-down play from the Nevada 4-yard line for the winning touchdown.

=== Kansas ===
Texas Tech Red Raiders at Kansas Jayhawks – Game summary

| Quarter | 1 | 2 | 3 | 4 | Total |
|---|---|---|---|---|---|
| Red Raiders | 7 | 17 | 21 | 0 | 45 |
| Jayhawks | 20 | 7 | 0 | 7 | 34 |

at Memorial Stadium, Lawrence, Kansas

- Date: October 1
- Game time: 11:00 a.m. CDT
- Game weather: Temperature: 62 °F (17 °C) • Weather: sunny • Wind: ESE 6 MPH
- Game attendance: 39,621
- Referee: Matt Loeffler
- TV announcers (FSN): Bill Land (Play-by-play), Dave Lapham (Color) & Emily Jones (Sideline)
- Box score

Game information

First quarter

- KU – James Sims 11-yard run (kick failed), 13:10. Jayhawks 6–0. Drive: 4 plays, 41 yards, 1:50.
- KU – Brandon Bourbon 51-yard run (Alex Mueller kick), 10:23. Jayhawks 13–0. Drive: 5 plays, 75 yards, 1:46.
- KU – Tim Biere 24-yard pass from Jordan Webb (Alex Mueller kick), 3:39. Jayhawks 20–0. Drive: 5 plays, 24 yards, 2:54.
- TTU – DeAndre Washington 1-yard run (Donnie Carona kick), 1:35. Jayhawks 20–7. Drive: 7 plays, 52 yards, 2:04.

Second quarter

- TTU – Eric Ward 40-yard pass from Seth Doege (Donnie Carona kick), 14:22. Jayhawks 20–14. Drive: 1 play, 25 yards, 0:29.
- TTU – Jacoby Franks 13-yard pass from Seth Doege (Donnie Carona kick), 10:48. Red Raiders 21–20. Drive: 6 plays, 45 yards, 1:00.
- TTU – Donnie Carona 46-yard field goal, 7:54. Red Raiders 24–20. Drive: 5 plays, 37 yards, 0:49.
- KU – Rell Lewis 19-yard pass from Jordan Webb (Alex Mueller kick), 0:47. Jayhawks 27–24. Drive: 10 plays, 62 yards, 3:38.

Third quarter

- TTU – Eric Stephens 8-yard run (Donnie Carona kick), 11:23. Red Raiders 31–27. Drive: 12 plays, 91 yards, 3:37.
- TTU – Eric Stephens 1-yard run (Donnie Carona kick), 5:21. Red Raiders 38–27. Drive: 11 plays, 80 yards, 3:29.
- TTU – Eric Ward 18-yard pass from Seth Doege (Donnie Carona kick), 2:49. Red Raiders 45–27. Drive: 8 plays, 64 yards, 2:07.

Fourth quarter

- KU – A.J. Steward 10-yard pass from Jordan Webb (Alex Mueller kick), 3:30. Red Raiders 45–34. Drive: 5 plays, 45 yards, 1:12.

Top passers

- TTU – Seth Doege – 29/46, 366 yards, 3 TD, INT
- KU – Jordan Webb – 16/22, 239 yards, 3 TD, 3 INT

Top rushers

- TTU – Eric Stephens – 26 rushes, 124 yards, 2 TD
- KU – Brandon Bourbon – 10 rushes, 101 yards, TD

Top receivers

- TTU – Cornelius Douglas – 4 receptions, 98 yards
- KU – D.J. Beshears – 3 receptions, 76 yards

The Red Raiders traveled to Lawrence, Kansas to open Big 12 Conference play against the Jayhawks. The Red Raiders fell behind the Jayhawks 20–0 in the first half but scored 24 straight points to take a 24–20 lead in the second quarter. True freshman DeAndre Washington scored on a 1-yard run for Texas Tech's first touchdown, and Seth Doege hooked up with Eric Ward for a 40-yard touchdown pass on Texas Tech's next possession. Ward's touchdown came just one play after Texas Tech safety D.J. Johnson intercepted a pass by KU's Jordan Webb. Johnson intercepted Webb again on Kansas's next possession, and Doege found Jacoby Franks for a 13-yard touchdown to give Texas Tech a 21–20 lead halfway through the second quarter. Donnie Carona added a 46-yard field goal to extend Texas Tech's lead to 24–20, but the Jayhawks scored just before halftime to take a 27–24 lead.

Texas Tech put the game away with a 21–0 run in the third quarter. Eric Stephens scored on runs of 1 and 8 yards, and Ward pulled in another Doege pass for a touchdown and a 45–27 Red Raider lead with time running out in the third quarter. Texas Tech's final touchdown pass came after an interception by Red Raider linebacker Cquilin Hubert in the end zone. Doege finished with 366 yards passing, and Stephens added 124 rushing yards in Texas Tech's Big 12 season-opening victory.

=== No. 24 Texas A&M ===
No. 24 Texas A&M Aggies at Texas Tech Red Raiders – Game summary

| Quarter | 1 | 2 | 3 | 4 | Total |
|---|---|---|---|---|---|
| No. 24 Aggies | 10 | 21 | 7 | 7 | 45 |
| Red Raiders | 7 | 13 | 10 | 10 | 40 |

at Jones AT&T Stadium, Lubbock, Texas

- Date: October 8
- Game time: 6:00 p.m. CDT
- Game attendance: 58,416
- Referee: Tom Walker
- TV announcers (FX): Gus Johnson (Play-by-play), Charles Davis (Color) & Tim Brewster (Sideline)
- Box score

Game information

First quarter

- TAMU – Ryan Tannehill 19-yard run (Randy Bullock kick), 13:04. Aggies 7–0. Drive: 7 plays, 83 yards, 1:56.
- TTU – Adam James 2-yard pass from Seth Doege (Donnie Carona kick), 9:31. Tied 7–7. Drive: 13 plays, 58 yards, 3:33.
- TAMU – Randy Bullock 45-yard field goal, 2:12. Aggies 10–7. Drive: 8 plays, 52 yards, 3:10.

Second quarter

- TTU – Donnie Carona 49-yard field goal, 14:19. Tied 10–10. Drive: 6 plays, 14 yards, 2:53.
- TAMU – Cyrus Gray 16-yard run (Randy Bullock kick), 11:54. Aggies 17–10. Drive: 7 plays, 73 yards, 2:25.
- TTU – Donnie Carona 27-yard field goal, 9:21. Aggies 17–13. Drive: 9 plays, 70 yards, 2:33.
- TAMU – Christine Michael 17-yard run (Randy Bullock kick), 7:16. Aggies 24–13. Drive: 5 plays, 60 yards, 2:05.
- TTU – Eric Stephens 4-yard run (Donnie Carona kick), 3:52. Aggies 24–20. Drive: 9 plays, 80 yards, 3:24.
- TAMU – Ryan Tannehill 10-yard run (Randy Bullock kick), 0:24. Aggies 31–20. Drive: 11 plays, 63 yards, 3:28.

Third quarter

- TTU – Donnie Carona 49-yard field goal, 9:10. Aggies 31–23. Drive: 9 plays, 32 yards, 2:47.
- TAMU – Terrence Frederick 63-yard blocked kick return (Randy Bullock kick), 4:33. Aggies 38–23.
- TTU – Eric Ward 5-yard pass from Seth Doege (Donnie Carona kick), 1:17. Aggies 38–30. Drive: 14 plays, 80 yards, 3:16.

Fourth quarter

- TAMU – Michael Lamothe 5-yard pass from Ryan Tannehill (Randy Bullock kick), 11:59. Aggies 45–30. Drive: 6 plays, 35 yards, 1:43.
- TTU – Donnie Carona 30-yard field goal, 9:34. Aggies 45–33. Drive: 10 plays, 37 yards, 2:25.
- TTU – Alex Torres 20-yard pass from Seth Doege (Donnie Carona kick), 0:31. Aggies 45–40. Drive: 9 plays, 91 yards, 2:24.

Top passers

- TAMU – Ryan Tannehill – 16/26, 188 yards, TD
- TTU – Seth Doege – 44/66, 391 yards, 3 TD

Top rushers

- TAMU – Cyrus Gray – 21 rushes, 116 yards, TD
- TTU – Eric Stephens – 22 rushes, 102 yards, TD

Top receivers

- TAMU – Uzoma Nwachukwu – 4 receptions, 74 yards
- TTU – Alex Torres – 8 receptions, 111 yards, TD

In the final game between Texas Tech and Texas A&M as Big 12 Conference opponents, the Aggies jumped out to a halftime lead and held on for the victory. The Aggies scored on five of their six first-half possessions to take a 31–20 lead. Aggie quarterback Ryan Tannehill opened the scoring with a 19-yard touchdown run, but the Raiders tied the score at 7–7 with a 2-yard touchdown pass to Adam James. Texas Tech's offense added a pair of Donnie Carona field goals and a touchdown run by Eric Stephens to stay within 11 points at halftime. Stephens rushed for 102 yards on 22 carries, but he was lost for the season when he suffered a knee injury late in the third quarter. Stephens was on pace to become the first Texas Tech 1,000-yard rusher since 1998, averaging 114 yards per game through his first five games of the season. He finished the year with 570 yards on 109 carries and eight touchdowns.

=== No. 17 Kansas State ===
No. 17 Kansas State Wildcats at Texas Tech Red Raiders – Game summary

| Quarter | 1 | 2 | 3 | 4 | Total |
|---|---|---|---|---|---|
| No. 17 Wildcats | 7 | 13 | 14 | 7 | 41 |
| Red Raiders | 7 | 21 | 3 | 3 | 34 |

at Jones AT&T Stadium, Lubbock, Texas

- Date: October 15
- Game time: 6:00 p.m. CDT
- Game weather: Temperature: 81 °F (27 °C) • Weather: clear • Wind: S 6 MPH
- Game attendance: 49,744
- Referee: Cooper Castleberry
- TV announcers (FSN): Joel Meyers (Play-by-play), Joel Klatt (Color) & Jim Knox (Sideline)
- Box score

Game information

First quarter

- KSU – Nigel Malone 24-yard interception return (Anthony Cantele kick), 14:23. Wildcats 7–0.
- TTU – Cornelius Douglas 40-yard pass from Seth Doege (Donnie Carona kick), 9:47. Tied 7–7. Drive: 5 plays, 66 yards, 1:25.

Second quarter

- TTU – DeAndre Washington 7-yard run (Donnie Carona kick), 14:46. Red Raiders 14–7. Drive: 10 plays, 87 yards, 2:41.
- KSU – Tyler Lockett 100-yard kick return (kick failed), 14:32. Red Raiders 14–13.
- KSU – Collin Klein 1-yard run (Anthony Cantele kick), 4:56. Wildcats 20–14. Drive: 9 plays, 46 yards, 4:48.
- TTU – Aaron Crawford 51-yard run (Donnie Carona kick), 3:55. Red Raiders 21–20. Drive: 4 plays, 72 yards, 1:01.
- TTU – Seth Doege 1-yard run (Donnie Carona kick), 0:35. Red Raiders 28–20. Drive: 9 plays, 55 yards, 1:53.

Third quarter

- KSU – Chris Harper 3-yard pass from Collin Klein (Anthony Cantele kick), 11:45. Red Raiders 28–27. Drive: 8 plays, 77 yards, 3:15.
- TTU – Donnie Carona 47-yard field goal, 2:56. Red Raiders 31–27. Drive: 14 plays, 63 yards, 3:11.
- KSU – Collin Klein 2-yard run (Anthony Cantele kick), 0:00. Wildcats 34–31. Drive: 6 plays, 73 yards, 2:56.

Fourth quarter

- KSU – Collin Klein 1-yard run (Anthony Cantele kick), 9:52. Wildcats 41–31. Drive: 3 plays, 22 yards, 1:00.
- TTU – Donnie Carona 19-yard field goal, 2:32. Wildcats 41–34. Drive: 12 plays, 66 yards, 2:41.

Top passers

- KSU – Collin Klein – 12/18, 146 yards, TD
- TTU – Seth Doege – 43/63, 461 yards, TD, 3 INT

Top rushers

- KSU – Collin Klein – 23 rushes, 110 yards, 3 TD
- TTU – Aaron Crawford – 21 rushes, 91 yards, TD

Top receivers

- KSU – Tramaine Thompson – 2 receptions, 41 yards
- TTU – Alex Torres – 12 receptions, 104 yards

Texas Tech's offense had 580 yards to Kansas State's 339, but several key mistakes would lead to the Red Raiders' defeat.

On Texas Tech's first drive, a Seth Doege pass was intercepted by Nigel Malone, who returned it 24-yards for a touchdown. In the second quarter, two Donnie Carona field goals were blocked: a 48-yard attempt and a 38-yard attempt, the second one being returned 36 yards by Malone. Texas Tech scored its second touchdown in the second quarter on a 7-yard run by DeAndre Washington. On the ensuing kickoff, Tyler Lockett returned Carona's kick 100-yards for a touchdown, but Anthony Cantele missed the extra point. The Red Raiders turned the ball over three times in the fourth quarter, all by Doege. With 13:24 left and down 31–34, Doege was sacked by Meshak Williams, who recovered the ball for Kansas State. On the next drive, the Wildcats would turn the ball over on downs at the Texas Tech 27-yard line. On the first play of the ensuing drive, Doege threw another interception; Kansas State would score on the following drive to go up 41–31. Texas Tech's next drive would end with a Doege interception, but the Wildcats would miss a 31-yard field goal on their next drive. With 2:32 left to play, Carona made a 19-yard field goal to make the score 34–41 in favor of Kansas State. Texas Tech would recover the ensuing onside kick, but the drive ended on a turnover on downs. Kansas State took over on downs and ran the clock out to win 41–34.

Seth Doege threw for 461 yards and a touchdown along with a rushing touchdown, but threw three interceptions and lost a fumble.

=== At No. 3 Oklahoma ===
Texas Tech Red Raiders at No. 3 Oklahoma Sooners – Game summary

| Quarter | 1 | 2 | 3 | 4 | Total |
|---|---|---|---|---|---|
| Red Raiders | 7 | 17 | 7 | 10 | 41 |
| No. 3 Sooners | 7 | 0 | 10 | 21 | 38 |

at Gaylord Family Oklahoma Memorial Stadium, Norman, Oklahoma

- Date: October 22
- Game time: 8:45 p.m. CDT
- Game weather: Temperature: 79 °F (26 °C) • Weather: scattered showers • Wind: S 9 MPH
- Game attendance: 85,204
- Referee: Mike Defee
- TV announcers (ABC/ESPN2): Brad Nessler (Play-by-play), Todd Blackledge (Color) & Holly Rowe (Sideline)
- Box score

Game information

First quarter

- TTU – Alex Torres 44-yard pass from Seth Doege (Donnie Carona kick), 13:52. Red Raiders 7–0. Drive: 4 plays, 54 yards, 1:08.
- OKLA – Kenny Stills 15-yard pass from Landry Jones (Michael Hunnicutt kick), 12:52. Tied 7–7. Drive: 3 plays, 69 yards, 1:00.

Second quarter

- TTU – Seth Doege 1-yard (Donnie Carona kick), 11:16. Red Raiders 14–7. Drive: 10 plays, 78 yards, 3:44.
- TTU – Alex Torres 30-yard pass from Seth Doege (Donnie Carona kick), 8:56. Red Raiders 21–7. Drive: 7 plays, 80 yards, 2:00.
- TTU – Donnie Carona 40-yard field goal, 1:26. Red Raiders 24–7. Drive: 9 plays, 24 yards, 3:07.

Third quarter

- TTU – Alex Torres 11-yard pass from Seth Doege (Donnie Carona kick), 12:57. Red Raiders 31–7. Drive: 4 plays, 72 yards, 1:19.
- OKLA – Kenny Stills 58-yard pass from Landry Jones (Michael Hunnicutt kick), 11:16. Red Raiders 31–14. Drive: 4 plays, 70 yards, 1:41.
- OKLA – Michael Hunnicutt 22-yard field goal, 2:38. Read Raiders 31–17. Drive: 7 plays, 50 yards, 3:48.

Fourth quarter

- OKLA – Trey Millard 3-yard pass from Landry Jones (Michael Hunnicutt kick), 14:55. Red Raiders 31–24. Drive: 7 plays, 44 yards, 2:00.
- TTU – Donnie Carona 37-yard field goal, 12:06. Red Raiders 34–24. Drive: 10 plays, 54 yards, 2:49.
- TTU – Tramain Swindall 14-yard pass from Seth Doege (Donnie Carona kick), 7:38. Red Raiders 41–24. Drive: 6 plays, 74 yards, 3:01.
- OKLA – Jaz Reynolds 55-yard pass from Landry Jones (Michael Hunnicutt kick), 6:54. Red Raiders 41–31. Drive: 5 plays, 71 yards, 0:53.
- OKLA – James Hanna 22-yard pass from Landry Jones (Michael Hunnicutt kick), 1:10. Red Raiders 41–38. Drive: 4 plays, 60 yards, 0:35.

Top passers

- TTU – Seth Doege – 33/52, 441 yards, 4 TD
- OKLA – Landry Jones – 30/55, 412 yards, 5 TD, INT

Top rushers

- TTU – DeAndre Washington – 16 rushes, 84 yards
- OKLA – Roy Finch – 13 rushes, 93 yards

Top receivers

- TTU – Alex Torres – 4 receptions, 93 yards, 3 TD
- OKLA – Kenny Stills – 8 receptions, 135 yards, 2 TD

Kickoff was originally scheduled for 7:00 p.m., but was delayed to 8:45 due to showers in the area.

The Red Raiders' victory over the Sooners ended Oklahoma's 39-game home winning streak, which started in 2005 after a loss to TCU in the season opener. The game was the Sooners’ first Big 12 Conference loss at Owen Field since 2001, and only the third time the team has lost at home under Bob Stoops. The Red Raiders were named the Tostitos Fiesta Bowl National Team of the Week for games of the weekend of October 22.

Seth Doege threw for 441 yards and four touchdown passes, three of them to Alex Torres, as the Red Raiders built a 24–7 halftime lead. Texas Tech's lead grew to 31–7 as Doege connected with Torres on a fade route for Torres' third touchdown of the night. The Sooners came storming back on a night in which the opening kickoff was delayed more than 90 minutes because of stormy weather. Oklahoma closed to within 31–24, but a Donnie Carona field goal and a touchdown pass from Doege to Oklahoma native Tramain Swindall built Texas Tech's lead back to 41–24. The Sooners added two late touchdowns, but tailback Aaron Crawford recovered Oklahoma's desperation onside kick attempt with time running out, and the Red Raiders were able to run out the clock for the win. With the victory, Texas Tech entered the national rankings for the first time in the season. The AP sports writers' poll placed Texas Tech at No. 19, and the USA Today Coaches Poll included Texas Tech at No. 22.

This was the last time Texas Tech defeated Oklahoma until 2022.

=== Iowa State ===
Iowa State Cyclones at No. 19 Texas Tech Red Raiders – Game summary

| Quarter | 1 | 2 | 3 | 4 | Total |
|---|---|---|---|---|---|
| Cyclones | 21 | 3 | 7 | 10 | 41 |
| No. 19 Red Raiders | 0 | 7 | 0 | 0 | 7 |

at Jones AT&T Stadium, Lubbock, Texas

- Date: October 29
- Game time: 6:00 p.m. CDT
- Game weather: Temperature: 64 °F (18 °C) • Weather: partly cloudy • Wind: SW 19 MPH
- Game attendance: 59,260
- Referee: Randy Christal
- TV announcers (FSN): Bill Land (Play-by-play), Gary Reasons (Color) & Desmond Purnell (Sideline)
- Box score

Game information

First quarter

- ISU – Jared Barnett 13-yard run (Zach Guyer kick), 10:52. Cyclones 7–0. Drive: 8 plays, 67 yards, 2:59.
- ISU – Jeff Woody 3-yard run (Zach Guyer kick), 3:26. Cyclones 14–0. Drive: 6 plays, 80 yards, 1:39.
- ISU – Darius Darks 2-yard pass from Jared Barnett (Zach Guyer kick), 2:20. Cyclones 21–0. Drive: 3 plays, 1 yard, 0:42.

Second quarter

- TTU – Seth Doege 8-yard run (Donnie Carona kick), 8:33. Cyclones 21–7. Drive: 6 plays, 58 yards, 1:37.
- ISU – Zach Guyer 42-yard field goal, 5:01. Cyclones 24–7. Drive: 10 plays, 44 yards, 3:32.

Third quarter

- ISU – Duran Hollis 71-yard run (Zach Guyer kick), 13:48. Cyclones 31–7. Drive: 3 plays, 80 yards, 1:12.

Fourth quarter

- ISU – James White 1-yard run (Zach Guyer kick), 11:08. Cyclones 38–7. Drive: 16 plays, 82 yards, 8:40.
- ISU – Zach Guyer 23-yard field goal, 4:48. Cyclones 41–7. Drive: 9 plays, 37 yards, 5:19.

Top passers

- ISU – Jared Barnett – 14/26, 144 yards, TD
- TTU – Seth Doege – 16/32, 171 yards, 2 INT

Top rushers

- ISU – James White – 31 rushes, 138 yards, TD
- TTU – DeAndre Washington – 11 rushes, 50 yards

Top receivers

- ISU – Josh Lenz – 4 receptions, 74 yards
- TTU – Eric Ward – 5 receptions, 62 yards

A week after upsetting Oklahoma, Texas Tech hosted Iowa State, which came into the game with a 3–4 record and a 0–4 mark in Big 12 play. The Cyclones jumped out to a 21–0 lead, but the Raiders scored on a Seth Doege touchdown run to narrow the halftime lead to 24–7. However, the Cyclones scored on their opening possession of the second half, and their defense shut out the Raiders for the rest of the game as they held on for a 41–7 rout. Iowa State rang up 368 rushing yards and over 500 yards of total offense.

=== At Texas ===
Texas Tech Red Raiders at Texas Longhorns – Game summary

| Quarter | 1 | 2 | 3 | 4 | Total |
|---|---|---|---|---|---|
| Red Raiders | 3 | 3 | 7 | 7 | 20 |
| Longhorns | 3 | 28 | 7 | 14 | 52 |

at Darrell K Royal–Texas Memorial Stadium, Austin, Texas

- Date: November 5
- Game time: 11:00 a.m. CDT
- Game weather: Temperature: 59 °F (15 °C) • Weather: sunny, humid • Wind: SSE 5 MPH
- Game attendance: 100,506
- Referee: Scott Novak
- TV announcers (FX): Gus Johnson (Play-by-play), Charles Davis (Color) & Tim Brewster (Sideline)
- Box score

Game information

First quarter

- TTU – Donnie Carona 29-yard field goal, 7:56. Red Raiders 3–0. Drive: 15 plays, 71 yards, 7:04.
- TEX – Justin Tucker 48-yard field goal, 4:24. Tied 3–3. Drive: 6 plays, 29 yards, 3:32.

Second quarter

- TEX – Fozzy Whittaker 12-yard run (Justin Tucker kick), 13:17. Longhorns 10–3. Drive: 7 plays, 80 yards, 2:37.
- TTU – Donnie Carona 40-yard field goal, 10:10. Longhorns 10–6. Drive: 7 plays, 61 yards, 3:07.
- TEX – Fozzy Whittaker 8-yard run (Justin Tucker kick), 8:33. Longhorns 17–6. Drive: 4 plays, 72 yards, 1:37.
- TEX – D.J. Monroe 12-yard run (Justin Tucker kick), 6:56. Longhorns 24–6. Drive: 3 plays, 63 yards, 0:56.
- TEX – Joe Bergeron 9-yard run (Justin Tucker kick), 1:46. Longhorns 31–6. Drive: 7 plays, 68 yards, 2:59.

Third quarter

- TEX – Joe Bergeron 5-yard run (Justin Tucker kick), 9:06. Longhorns 38–6. Drive: 11 plays, 80 yards, 5:54.
- TTU – Eric Ward 8-yard pass from Seth Doege (Donnie Carona kick), 3:10. Longhorns 38–13. Drive: 15 plays, 80 yards, 5:56.

Fourth quarter

- TEX – Joe Bergeron 12-yard run (Justin Tucker kick), 14:53. Longhorns 45–13. Drive: 9 plays, 84 yards, 3:17.
- TEX – Darius White 31-yard pass from Case McCoy (Justin Tucker kick), 5:48. Longhorns 52–13. Drive: 12 plays, 94 yards, 6:37.
- TTU – Darrin Moore 1-yard pass from Seth Doege (Donnie Carona kick), 1:01. Longhorns 52–20. Drive: 12 plays, 74 yards, 4:47.

Top passers

- TTU – Seth Doege – 40/55, 381 yards, 2 TD
- TEX – David Ash – 4/7, 125 yards

Top rushers

- TTU – Kenny Williams – 10 rushes, 25 yards
- TEX – Joe Bergeron – 29 rushes, 191 yards, 3 TD

Top receivers

- TTU – Adam James – 5 receptions, 95 yards
- TEX – Mike Davis – 2 receptions, 72 yards

Texas Tech's defense struggled, giving up 595 total yards of offense, including 439 rushing yards; the Red Raiders' offense finished the game with 411 yards. Texas never punted the ball during the game.

=== No. 2 Oklahoma State ===
No. 2 Oklahoma State Cowboys at Texas Tech Red Raiders – Game summary

| Quarter | 1 | 2 | 3 | 4 | Total |
|---|---|---|---|---|---|
| No. 2 Cowboys | 21 | 28 | 14 | 3 | 66 |
| Red Raiders | 0 | 0 | 6 | 0 | 6 |

at Jones AT&T Stadium, Lubbock, Texas

- Date: November 12
- Game time: 11:00 a.m.
- Game weather: Temperature: 64 °F (18 °C) • Weather: partly cloudy • Wind: W 19 MPH
- Game attendance: 57,205
- Referee: Greg Burks
- TV announcers (ABC): Bob Wischusen (Play-by-play), Bob Davie (Color) & Shelley Smith (Sideline)
- Box score

Game information

First quarter

- OKST – Justin Blackmon 2-yard pass from Brandon Weeden (Quinn Sharp kick), 10:52. Cowboys 7–0. Drive: 8 plays, 59 yards, 3:29.
- OKST – Joseph Randle 2-yard run (Quinn Sharp kick), 5:19. Cowboys 14–0. Drive: 6 plays, 29 yards, 1:24.
- OKST – Josh Stewart 27-yard pass from Brandon Weeden (Quinn Sharp kick), 1:42. Cowboys 21–0. Drive: 5 plays, 81 yards, 1:42.

Second quarter

- OKST – Isaiah Anderson 28-yard pass from Brandon Weeden (Quinn Sharp kick), 14:37. Cowboys 28–0. Drive: 3 plays, 38 yards, 0:25.
- OKST – Josh Stewart 3-yard fumble return (Quinn Sharp kick), 14:33. Cowboys 35–0.
- OKST – Joseph Randle 1-yard run (Quinn Sharp kick), 5:33. Cowboys 42–0. Drive: 10 plays, 77 yards, 3:54.
- OKST – Joseph Randle 10-yard run (Quinn Sharp kick), 0:37. Cowboys 49–0. Drive: 8 plays, 67 yards, 2:39.

Third quarter

- TTU – Cornelius Douglas 37-yard fumble return (pass failed), 13:04. Cowboys 49–6.
- OKST – Justin Blackmon 48-yard pass from Brandon Weeden (Quinn Sharp kick), 11:32. Cowboys 56–6. Drive: 5 plays, 68 yards, 1:32.
- OKST – Josh Stewart 66-yard pass from Brandon Weeden (Quinn Sharp kick), 3:53. Cowboys 63–6. Drive: 3 plays, 77 yards, 0:37.

Fourth quarter

- OKST – Quinn Sharp 37-yard field goal, 10:13. Cowboys 66–6. Drive: 12 plays, 61 yards, 6:09.

Top passers

- OKST – Brandon Weeden – 31/37, 423 yards, 5 TD
- TTU – Seth Doege – 25/43, 169 yards, INT

Top rushers

- OKST – Herschel Sims – 13 rushes, 109 yards
- TTU – DeAndre Washington – 11 rushes, 47 yards

Top receivers

- OKST – Josh Cooper – 6 receptions, 106 yards
- TTU – DeAndre Washington – 4 receptions, 41 yards

Texas Tech struggled on both sides of the ball, with the defense giving up 637 yards and the offense only managing 270 yards. The Red Raiders only scored once during the entire game, with Cornelius Douglas recovering a fumble and returning it 37 yards for a touchdown.

=== At Missouri ===
Texas Tech Red Raiders at Missouri Tigers – Game summary

| Quarter | 1 | 2 | 3 | 4 | Total |
|---|---|---|---|---|---|
| Red Raiders | 14 | 3 | 10 | 0 | 27 |
| Tigers | 0 | 10 | 7 | 14 | 31 |

at Faurot Field, Columbia, Missouri

- Date: November 19
- Game time: 2:30 p.m. CST
- Game weather: Temperature: 66 °F (19 °C) • Weather: partly cloudy • Wind: SSW 31 MPH
- Game attendance: 54,309
- Referee: Scott Novak
- TV announcers (ABC/ESPN2): Dave LaMont (Play-by-play) & Ray Bentley (Color)
- Box score

Game information

First quarter

- TTU – Bradley Marquez 1-yard run (Donnie Carona kick), 10:51. Red Raiders 7–0. Drive: 9 plays, 57 yards, 2:01.
- TTU – Seth Doege 3-yard run (Donnie Carona kick), 1:21. Red Raiders 14–0. Drive: 13 plays, 80 yards, 3:57.

Second quarter

- MIZ – James Franklin 5-yard run (Trey Barrow kick), 4:59. Red Raiders 14–7. Drive: 10 plays, 90 yards, 3:40.
- TTU – Donnie Carona 48-yard field goal, 0:27. Red Raiders 17–7. Drive: 11 plays, 49 yards, 4:32.
- MIZ – Trey Barrow 39-yard field goal, 0:00. Red Raiders 17–10. Drive: 3 plays, 36 yards, 0:21.

Third quarter

- TTU – Donnie Carona 33-yard field goal, 9:15. Red Raiders 20–10. Drive: 13 plays, 63 yards, 5:45.
- MIZ – Michael Egnew 5-yard pass from James Franklin (Trey Barrow kick), 4:43. Red Raiders 20–17. Drive: 9 plays, 70 yards, 4:28.
- TTU – Darrin Moore 24-yard pass from Seth Doege (Donnie Carona kick), 0:01. Red Raiders 27–17. Drive: 12 plays, 77 yards, 4:38.

Fourth quarter

- MIZ – Marcus Lucas 7-yard pass from James Franklin (Trey Barrow kick), 12:03. Red Raiders 27–24. Drive: 7 plays, 63 yards, 2:57.
- MIZ – James Franklin 9-yard run (Trey Barrow kick), 2:22. Tigers 31–27. Drive: 10 plays, 89 yards, 3:44.

Top passers

- TTU – Seth Doege – 37/53, 315 yards, TD, INT
- MIZ – James Franklin – 13/20, 172 yards, 2 TD

Top rushers

- TTU – Aaron Crawford – 14 rushes, 70 yards
- MIZ – James Franklin – 20 rushes, 152 yards, 2 TD

Top receivers

- TTU – Darrin Moore – 9 receptions, 88 yards, TD
- MIZ – Marcus Lucas – 4 receptions, 68 yards, TD

Texas Tech led for most of the game, but were shutout in the 4th quarter while also giving up 14 points. Missouri took its first lead of the game with 2:22 left on a 9-yard run from quarterback James Franklin. On the next drive, the Red Raiders marched down the field to the Tigers' 7-yard line, but a Seth Doege pass was intercepted by Michael Sam (Texas Tech's only turnover of the game) with 0:32 left to play.

This is the last game played between Texas Tech and Missouri as conference members, as Missouri began playing in the Southeastern Conference the following year.

=== Vs. No. 21 Baylor ===
Texas Tech Red Raiders vs. No. 21 Baylor Bears – Game summary

| Quarter | 1 | 2 | 3 | 4 | Total |
|---|---|---|---|---|---|
| Red Raiders | 7 | 21 | 7 | 7 | 42 |
| No. 21 Bears | 10 | 21 | 21 | 14 | 66 |

at Cowboys Stadium, Arlington, Texas

- Date: November 26
- Game time: 6:00 p.m. CST
- Game weather: Played indoors (retractable roof closed)
- Game attendance: 51,615
- Referee: Randy Christal
- TV announcers (FSN): Bill Land (Play-by-play), Dave Lapham (Color), Emily Jones (Sideline)
- Box score

Game information

First quarter

- BAY – Aaron Jones 28-yard field goal, 11:13. Bears 3–0. Drive: 7 plays, 44 yards, 2:28.
- BAY – Kendall Wright 33-yard pass from Robert Griffin III (Aaron Jones kick), 6:57. Bears 10–0. Drive: 12 plays, 73 yards, 3:10.
- TTU – Kenny Williams 5-yard run (Donnie Carona kick), 3:39. Bears 10–7. Drive: 9 plays, 76 yards, 3:18.

Second quarter

- BAY – Robert Griffin III 5-yard run (Aaron Jones kick), 14:54. Bears 17–7. Drive: 10 plays, 66 yards, 3:45.
- TTU – Eric Ward 2-yard pass from Seth Doege (Donnie Carona kick), 10:55. Bears 17–14. Drive: 13 plays, 74 yards, 3:59.
- BAY – Terrance Ganaway 4-yard run (Aaron Jones kick), 8:40. Bears 24–14. Drive: 7 plays, 61 yards, 2:15.
- TTU – Darrin Moore 43-yard pass from Jacob Karam (Donnie Carona kick), 7:57. Bears 24–21. Drive: 2 plays, 43 yards, 0:43.
- BAY – Robert Griffin III 3-yard run (Aaron Jones kick), 1:36. Bears 31–21. Drive: 12 plays, 86 yards, 4:57.
- TTU – Darrin Moore 1-yard pass from Seth Doege (Donnie Carona kick), 0:08. Bears 31–28. Drive: 7 plays, 60 yards, 1:28.

Third quarter

- BAY – Kendall Wright 46-yard pass from Nick Florence (Aaron Jones kick), 10:09. Bears 38–28. Drive: 5 plays, 80 yards, 1:26.
- BAY – Terrance Williams 40-yard pass from Nick Florence (Aaron Jones kick), 6:05. Bears 45–28. Drive: 8 plays, 77 yards, 2:27.
- BAY – Joe Williams 90-yard interception return (Aaron Jones kick), 2:26. Bears 52–28.
- TTU – Kenny Williams 14-yard run, 0:14. Bears 52–35. Drive: 6 plays, 64 yards, 2:12.

Fourth quarter

- TTU – Eric Ward 33-yard pass from Seth Doege (Donnie Carona kick), 14:03. Bears 52–42. Drive: 1 play, 33 yards, 0:12.
- BAY – Nick Florence 1-yard run (Aaron Jones kick), 9:33. Bears 59–42. Drive: 12 plays, 69 yards, 4:30.
- BAY – Terrance Ganaway 4-yard run (Donnie Carona kick), 6:24. Bears 66–42. Drive: 3 plays, 21 yards, 1:02.

Top passers

- TTU – Seth Doege – 41/55, 355 yards, 3 TD, 2 INT
- BAY – Nick Florence – 9/12, 151 yards, 2 TD

Top rushers

- TTU – Kenny Williams – 9 rushes, 41 yards, 2 TD
- BAY – Terrance Ganaway – 42 rushes, 246 yards, 2 TD

Top receivers

- TTU – Eric Ward – 16 receptions, 151 yards, 2 TD
- BAY – Kendall Wright – 6 receptions, 125 yards, 2 TD

Texas Tech's defense gave up 360 rushing yards, but forced and recovered four fumbles. Backup quarterback Jacob Karam appeared for one play, throwing a 43-yard touchdown pass to Darrin Moore. Texas Tech attempted and recovered an onside kick on the ensuing kickoff, but the drive ended with a punt. Seth Doege threw two interceptions while running back Kenny Williams and wide receiver Adam Jones both each lost a fumble.

== Statistics ==
=== Scoring ===
Scores against non-conference opponents

| | 1 | 2 | 3 | 4 | Total |
|---|---|---|---|---|---|
| Opponents | 10 | 21 | 14 | 12 | 57 |
| Texas Tech | 23 | 31 | 48 | 42 | 144 |

Scores against the Big 12

| | 1 | 2 | 3 | 4 | Total |
|---|---|---|---|---|---|
| Opponents | 99 | 131 | 108 | 90 | 428 |
| Texas Tech | 52 | 102 | 71 | 37 | 262 |

Scores against all opponents

| | 1 | 2 | 3 | 4 | Total |
|---|---|---|---|---|---|
| Opponents | 109 | 152 | 122 | 102 | 485 |
| Texas Tech | 75 | 133 | 119 | 79 | 406 |
