= Eric Ward (wide receiver) =

American football player (born 1990)

Profile
- Position: Wide receiver

Personal information
- Born: July 24, 1990 (age 36); Los Angeles, California, U.S.
- Listed height: 5 ft 11 in (1.80 m)
- Listed weight: 199 lb (90 kg)

Career information
- High school: S. H. Rider (Wichita Falls, Texas)
- College: Texas Tech
- NFL draft: 2014: undrafted

Career history
- Tennessee Titans (2014)*; Cincinnati Bengals (2015)
- * Offseason or practice squad member only

Awards and highlights
- 2× Second-team All-Big 12 (2012, 2013)
- Stats at Pro Football Reference

Eric Ward (born July 24, 1990) is an American former football wide receiver. Ward played at the college level for Texas Tech.

== Early life ==
Ward played at the wide receiver position at S. H. Rider High School in Wichita Falls, Texas. Ward was rated a 4-star prospect by Rivals.com coming out of high school.

== College career ==
=== 2009-2010 ===
Ward played at the college level for Texas Tech where he redshirted his freshman season in 2009. In his redshirt freshman season in 2010, Ward played in 11 games and finished the season with 6 receptions for 63 yards.

=== 2011 ===
Ward broke out in his sophomore year in 2011, starting in 11 games. In the September 24, 2011 contest against Nevada, Ward would catch the game winning touchdown with 35 seconds left in the game to seal a victory. In the following week's game against Kansas, Ward's two touchdown receptions marked the first occasion that a Texas Tech receiver had caught multiple touchdowns in consecutive games since Michael Crabtree in 2008.

In the November 26, 2011 game against #18 Baylor at AT&T Stadium, Ward broke the school record for single-game receptions with 16, coming two shy of the overall Big 12 Conference record of 18. Ward would conclude the 2011 season leading the team with 84 receptions, 800 receiving yards, and 11 receiving touchdowns.

For his performance, Ward was named All-Big 12 Conference 2nd Team by the San Antonio Express-News, Fort Worth Star-Telegram, and the Waco Tribune-Herald. He also earned an Academic All-Big 12 2nd team selection, in addition to an All-Big 12 Honorable Mention selection by the conference's coaches.

=== 2012 ===
Coming off of his successful 2011 season, Ward was named to the Biletnikoff Award watch list for the best receiver in the country. Additionally, he was selected as a pre-season All-Big 12 conference selection by Phil Steele.

In the second game of the season on September 15, 2012 against New Mexico Ward would catch 3 touchdown passes in the first half becoming the first Red Raider to do so since Michael Crabtree in 2007. The New Mexico game also marked an NCAA record setting performance by quarterback Seth Doege who threw for a 90.9 percent completion percentage.

Against Iowa State, Ward first passed the 1,000 career receiving yards mark. Ward would go on to record three straight 100+ receiving yard games against Kansas, Texas, and Kansas State; again, the first Red Raider to do so since Michael Crabtree in 2007.

Ward concluded his junior season fourth in school career receiving touchdowns, and joined Michael Crabtree as the only players in school history to catch 11 or more touchdowns in back to back seasons. Ward would be named All-Big 12 Conference 1st Team by the San Antonio Express-News and 2nd Team by the Dallas Morning News. Additionally, he was named an All-Big 12 Conference honorable mention selection by the league's coaches.

=== 2013 ===
Ward declined to enter the 2013 NFL draft as an underclassman to return for his senior season to boost his stock as well as complete his Master's degree in human development and family studies. Prior to the season, Ward was named a preseason All-Big 12 1st Team selection by the Big 12 media and College Football News. Additionally, Ward was named again to the Biletnikoff Award watchlist as well as the inaugural Earl Campbell Tyler Rose Award watchlist.

Playing with true freshman quarterbacks Davis Webb and Baker Mayfield, as well as Unanimous All-American Jace Amaro, Ward's offensive production would drop as Amaro was targeted more. Ward would accrue more than 100 yards in the season opener against SMU as well as games against Kansas, Kansas State, and Baylor. Ward completed his Texas Tech career by contributing to a 37-23 upset over #14 Arizona State in the Holiday Bowl.

For his performance, Ward was named an All-Big 12 Conference 2nd Team selection by the Associated Press, Big 12 Broadcasters, and Athlon Sports. Ward's career stats rank third in school career receptions at 255, third in career receiving touchdowns with 31, and fifth in career receiving yards with 2,863.

== Professional career ==
=== Pre-draft ===
Pre-draft measurables
Height	Weight	40-yard dash	10-yard split	20-yard split	20-yard shuttle	Three-cone drill	Vertical jump	Broad jump	Bench press
5 ft 11 in (1.80 m)	199 lb (90 kg)	4.54 s	1.58 s	2.68 s	4.30 s	7.02 s	34 1/2 in (0.88 m)	9 ft 7 in (2.92 m)	13 reps
All values from Texas Tech Pro Day

Ward would go undrafted in the 2014 NFL draft before being signed as a free agent to the Tennessee Titans. He was released on September 2, 2014 and was signed by the Cincinnati Bengals on January 1, 2015.

== Personal life ==
Ward graduated Texas Tech with a Master of Education degree in Special Education. He is married to his high school girlfriend and has five children, all boys.
