= AT&T ESPN All-America Player =

- Awarded for: college football's player of the week and player of the year
- Country: United States
- Presented by: AT&T and ESPN

History
- First award: 2004
- Most recent: Jadeveon Clowney (yearly award)
- Website: http://www.espnallamerica.com

The AT&T ESPN All-America Player is a joint marketing venture between AT&T and ESPN that allows fans to select college football's player of the week and player of the year respectively. Each "vote" counts as an entry into an AT&T sweepstakes, usually for a trip to the BCS National Championship game. According to a press release, AT&T does not "divulge or confirm the number of votes". AT&T and ESPN share the revenue generated from the promotion. The award was previously known as the Cingular All-America Player before AT&T acquired Cingular.

== All-America Player of the Year winners ==
Season	Player	Position	Team
2004	Cedric Benson	RB	Texas
2005	Vince Young	QB	Texas
2006	Brady Quinn	QB	Notre Dame
2007	Michael Crabtree	WR	Texas Tech
2008	Graham Harrell	QB	Texas Tech
2009	Colt McCoy	QB	Texas
2010	LaMichael James	RB	Oregon
2011	Robert Griffin III	QB	Baylor
2012	Jadeveon Clowney	DE	South Carolina
2013	A. J. McCarron	QB	Alabama

== All-America Player of the Week winners ==
=== 2011 ===
Week	Player	Position	College	Source
Week 1	Robert Griffin III	QB	Baylor	
Week 2	Denard Robinson	QB	Michigan	
Week 3	Seth Doege	QB	Texas Tech	
Week 4	Brandon Weeden	QB	Oklahoma State	
Week 5	Tyler Wilson	QB	Arkansas	
Week 6				
Week 7				
Week 8	Seth Doege	QB	Texas Tech	

=== 2010 ===
Week	Player	Position	College	Source
Week 1	Denard Robinson	QB	Michigan	
Week 2	Denard Robinson	QB	Michigan	
Week 3	Ryan Mallett	QB	Arkansas	
Week 4	Mark Ingram II	RB	Alabama	
Week 5	Denard Robinson	QB	Michigan	
Week 6	Taylor Potts	QB	Texas Tech	

=== 2009 ===
Week	Player	Position	College	Source
Week 1	Jimmy Clausen	QB	Notre Dame	
Week 2	Tate Forcier	QB	Michigan	
Week 3	Landry Jones	QB	Oklahoma	
Week 4	Adrian Clayborn	DE	Iowa	
Week 5	Golden Tate	WR	Notre Dame	
Week 6	Jonathan Crompton	QB	Tennessee	
Week 7	Mark Ingram II	RB	Alabama	
Week 8	Terrence Cody	G	Alabama	
Week 9	Case Keenum	QB	Houston	
Week 10	Jordan Shipley	WR	Texas	
Week 11	Dexter McCluster	RB/WR	Mississippi	
Week 12	Jeremiah Masoli	QB	Oregon	
Week 13	Colt McCoy	QB	Texas	

=== 2008 ===
Week	Player	Position	College	Source
Week 1	Graham Harrell	QB	Texas Tech	
Week 2	Patrick Pinkney	QB	East Carolina	
Week 3	Michael Crabtree	WR	Texas Tech	
Week 4	Jarrett Lee	QB	LSU	
Week 5	John Parker Wilson	QB	Alabama	
Week 6	Graham Harrell	QB	Texas Tech	
Week 7	Jordan Shipley	WR	Texas	
Week 8	Colt McCoy	QB	Texas	
Week 9	Matt Williams	PK	Texas Tech	
Week 10	Graham Harrell	QB	Texas Tech	
Week 11	Graham Harrell	QB	Texas Tech	

=== 2007 ===
Week	Player	Position	College	Source
Week 4	Graham Harrell	QB	Texas Tech	
Week 6	Graham Harrell	QB	Texas Tech	
Week 11	Kevin Smith	RB	UCF	

=== 2006 ===
Week	Player	Position	College
September 2	Ray Rice	RB	Rutgers
September 9	Brady Quinn	QB	Notre Dame
September 16	Mario Manningham	WR	Michigan
September 23	Brady Quinn	QB	Notre Dame
September 30	Calvin Johnson	WR	Georgia Tech
October 7	Erik Ainge	QB	Tennessee
October 14	Colt McCoy	QB	Texas
October 21	John Beck	QB	Brigham Young
October 28	Colt McCoy	QB	Texas
November 4	Darren McFadden	RB	Arkansas
November 11	Josh Freeman	QB	Kansas State
November 18	Troy Smith	QB	Ohio State

=== 2005 ===
Week	Player	Position	College
September 3	D. J. Shockley	QB	Georgia
September 10	Vince Young	QB	Texas
September 17	Reggie McNeal	QB	Texas A&M
September 24	Laurence Maroney	RB	Minnesota
October 1	Brady Quinn	QB	Notre Dame
October 8	Maurice Drew	RB	UCLA
October 15	Vince Young	QB	Texas
October 22	Brady Quinn	QB	Notre Dame
October 29	Vince Young	QB	Texas
November 5	Tom Zbikowski	SS	Notre Dame
November 12	Kenny Irons	RB	Auburn
November 19	Reggie Bush	RB	USC
November 26	Adrian Peterson	RB	Oklahoma

=== 2004 ===
Week	Player	Position	College
September 12	Kyle Orton	QB	Purdue
September 19	Sonny Cumbie	QB	Texas Tech
September 26	Kyle Orton	QB	Purdue
October 3	David Greene	QB	Georgia
October 10	Adrian Peterson	RB	Oklahoma
October 17	Jason Campbell	QB	Auburn
October 24	Michael Hart	RB	Michigan
October 31	Adrian Peterson	RB	Oklahoma
November 6	Jason White	QB	Oklahoma
November 13	Carnell Williams	RB	Auburn
November 20	Adrian Peterson	RB	Oklahoma
November 27	Matt Leinart	QB	USC
