= Darius White =

American football player (born 1992)

No. 6
- Position: Wide receiver

Personal information
- Born: September 11, 1991 (age 33)
- Stats at Pro Football Reference

Darius White (born 1992) is a wide receiver. He currently an undrafted free agent. White was a 2009 High School All-American by USA Today, Parade and EA Sports.

A native of Dallas, Texas, White attended Dunbar High School in Fort Worth, Texas, where he recorded 93 catches for 2,293 yards and 35 TDs and a punt return and kickoff return for a TD over his final three seasons. Regarded as a four-star recruit by Rivals.com, White was listed as the No. 6 wide receiver prospect in the class of 2010.

In December 2011, White elected to transfer from the University of Texas to the University of Missouri.
