= Seth Doege =

American football player and coach (born 1988)

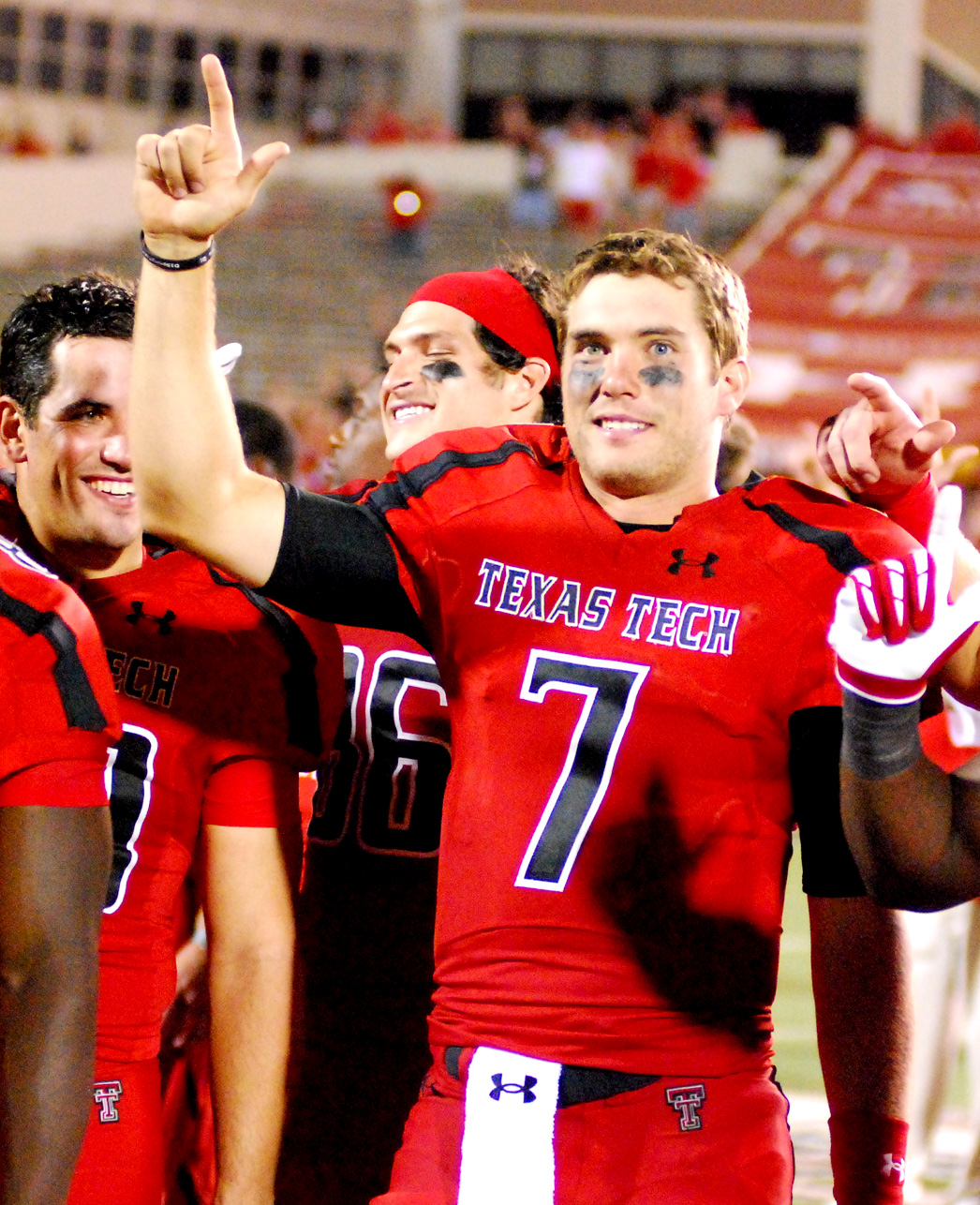

Current position
- Title: Offensive coordinator, quarterbacks coach
- Team: Arizona
- Conference: Big 12

Biographical details
- Born: December 18, 1988 (age 37); San Angelo, Texas, U.S.

Playing career
- 2008–2012: Texas Tech
- 2013: Atlanta Falcons (Note: Offseason and/or practice squad member only)
- 2014–2015: Saskatchewan Roughriders
- Position: Quarterback

Coaching career (HC unless noted)
- 2016: Bowling Green (GA)
- 2017: Bowling Green (WR)
- 2018: Bowling Green (STC/WR)
- 2019–2020: USC (OQC)
- 2021: USC (TE)
- 2022: Ole Miss (analyst)
- 2023: Purdue (TE)
- 2024: Marshall (OC/QB)
- 2025–present: Arizona (OC/QB)

Seth Colton Doege (born December 18, 1988) is an American college football coach and former quarterback, who is the current offensive coordinator and quarterbacks coach for the Arizona Wildcats. After playing college football for the Texas Tech Red Raiders, he was signed by the Atlanta Falcons as an undrafted free agent in 2013. On February 27, 2014, he was signed to the Saskatchewan Roughriders of the Canadian Football League. Doege was Texas Tech's starting quarterback for the 2011 and 2012 seasons.

== Early life ==
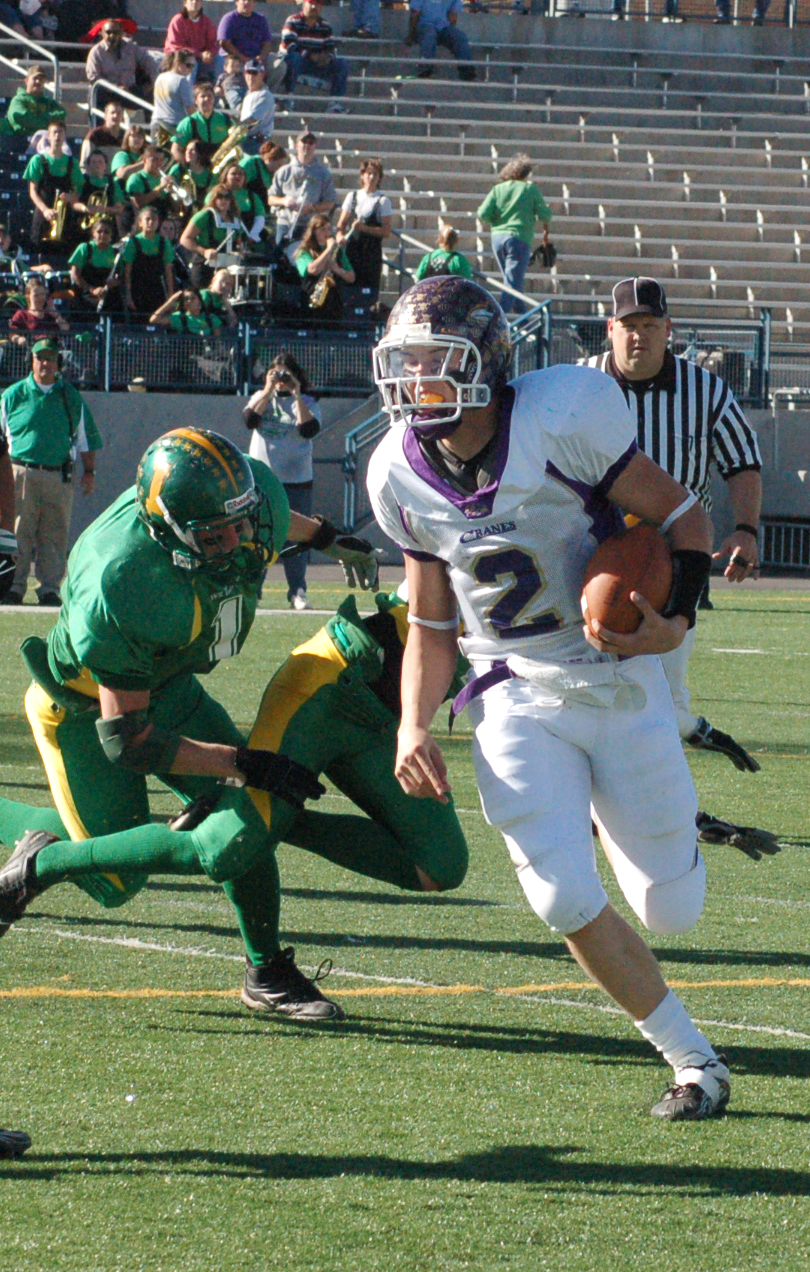
Seth Doege in a touchdown during a Crane playoff win over Idalou during the 2005 season

Doege was born in San Angelo, Texas, to Randy and Melinda Doege. He has one younger brother. Randy Doege coached at several high schools in West Texas before becoming the head coach at Crane High School in 2003. In his freshman season, 2004, Seth Doege was the starting quarterback for Crane High School and led the Golden Cranes to the area round of the playoffs, a loss to the (Tuscola) Jim Ned Indians, who were led by senior quarterback Colt McCoy. In 2005, his sophomore year in high school, Doege led the Cranes to a 13–1 record (9–1 regular season, plus three playoff wins) before Crane fell to Childress in the class 2A Region I championship game. After attending quarterback camps during the summer before his junior year, Doege was recruited heavily by several major universities, including the University of Florida, the University of Oklahoma, and Purdue University.

Doege transferred to (Wolfforth) Frenship High School before his junior year of high school, but during August workouts, he tore the anterior cruciate ligament (ACL) in one of his knees and was sidelined for the 2006 high school season. He tore the ACL in his other knee in the summer of 2007, missing his senior high school season. Despite the injuries, Texas Tech head coach Mike Leach honored the school's earlier 2006 offer of a scholarship, and Doege signed his letter of intent to play for the Red Raiders in February 2008.

As a sophomore at Crane High School, Doege threw for 2,439 yards with 27 touchdowns against only four interceptions. He also ran for 526 yards and three touchdowns on just 78 carries.

== College career ==
=== 2009 and 2010 seasons ===
Doege accepted a football scholarship from Texas Tech as part of the 2008 recruiting class. He spent the 2008 season as a redshirt player, seeing no action. He saw limited action in the 2009 and 2010 seasons, though he did start for the Red Raiders in an October 31, 2009, victory against Kansas because of injuries to starting quarterback Taylor Potts and backup Steven Sheffield. Doege completed 14 of 28 passes for 159 yards and one touchdown in the Kansas game. Doege also threw for 68 yards and a touchdown in the fourth quarter of Tech's 66–14 win over Kansas State in 2009.

=== 2011 season ===
Doege became Texas Tech's starting quarterback in 2011. He set a Division I (NCAA) record for the highest completion percentage of quarterbacks throwing 40 or more completions in a game, completing 40-of-44 passes (90.9%) during the September 17, 2011, game against the New Mexico Lobos. The completion record was previously held by Kliff Kingsbury, another Texas Tech quarterback, who completed 49-of-59 for an 83% completion percentage. Doege also tied the school record set by Taylor Potts for consecutive pass completions by completing 15 in a row during the same game. For his performance at the New Mexico game, he was named co-Big 12 offensive player of the week and AT&T ESPN All-America Player of the Week.

Doege threw for a career-high 461 yards in a 41–34 loss to Kansas State on October 15, 2011.

One week after the loss to Kansas State, Doege led the Red Raiders to a 41–38 upset victory over number-three Oklahoma in Norman. Doege completed 33 of 52 passes for 441 yards and four touchdowns against Oklahoma. For his performance, he earned recognition as the Walter Camp Football Foundation National Offensive Player of the Week and the Rivals.com National Player of the Week. Additionally, he was again named the AT&T ESPN All-America Player of the Week, his second time to be so honored during the 2011 season. Offensive coordinator Neal Brown was also named National Coordinator of the Week by Rivals.

Doege finished the 2011 season with 398 of 581 completions for 4,004 yards and 28 touchdowns. He ranked eighth among all NCAA FBS quarterbacks in passing yardage.

=== 2012 season ===
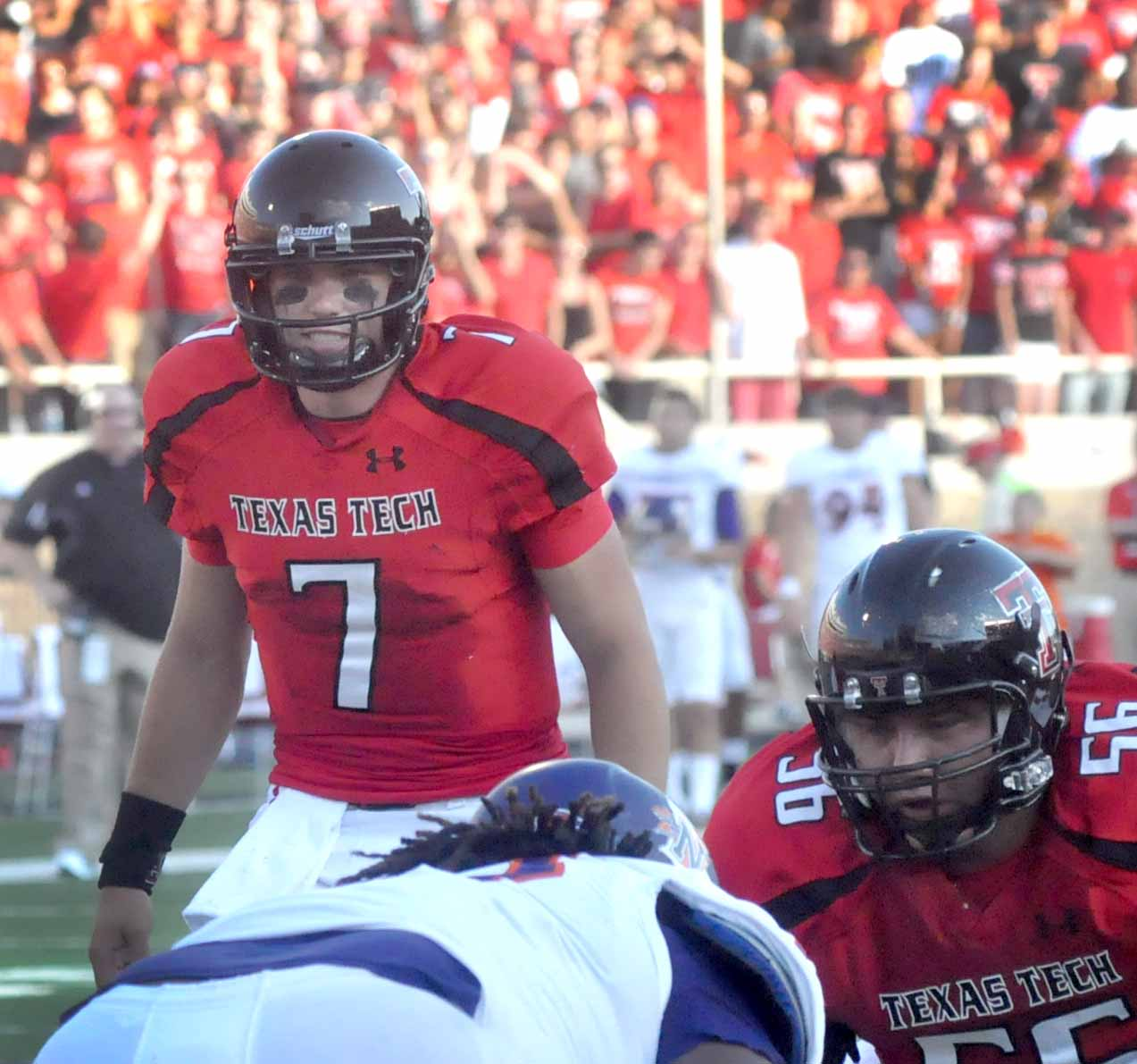
Doege in action for Texas Tech in their season-opening win over Northwestern State (Louisiana) on Sep 1, 2012

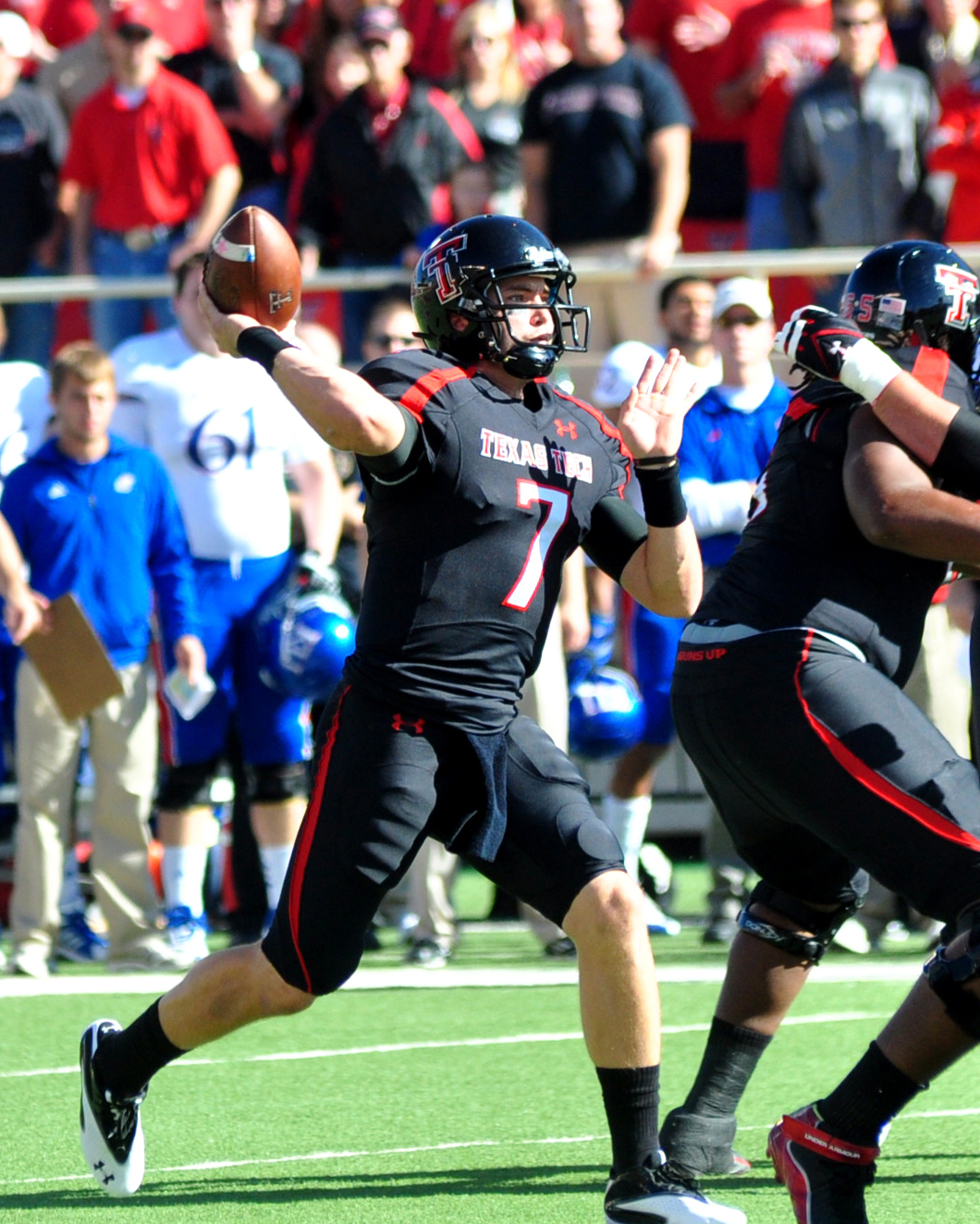
Seth Doege completes a pass against Kansas during Texas Tech's overtime win in November 2012

Entering his senior year for the 2012 football season, he was named to the preseason watch list for five major college football awards: the Davey O'Brien Award, the Walter Camp Award, the Manning Award, the Maxwell Award, and the Johnny Unitas Golden Arm Award. In the first three games of the 2012 season, Doege led Tech to victories over the Northwestern State Demons, Texas State Bobcats, and New Mexico Lobos. In those three nonconference games, Doege completed 74.3% of his passes for 858 yards and 12 touchdowns (the most in the NCAA's FBS division after the first three games). He compiled those statistics despite being pulled from action during the third quarter of the three lopsided Texas Tech victories.

Doege threw three touchdown passes as Texas Tech opened Big XII play with a 24–13 win over Iowa State, but he was intercepted three times as Tech fell to Oklahoma by the score of 41–20. Texas Tech bounced back the next week on October 13, defeating then-number-five-ranked (AP poll) West Virginia in a 49–14 upset. Doege threw for 504 yards (a career high) and six touchdowns (tying his career high) in the victory. For his performance, he was nominated for the ESPN/AT&T All-America Player of the Week award, was named the Big XII Offensive Player of the Week, and was named the Davey O'Brien Quarterback of the Week.

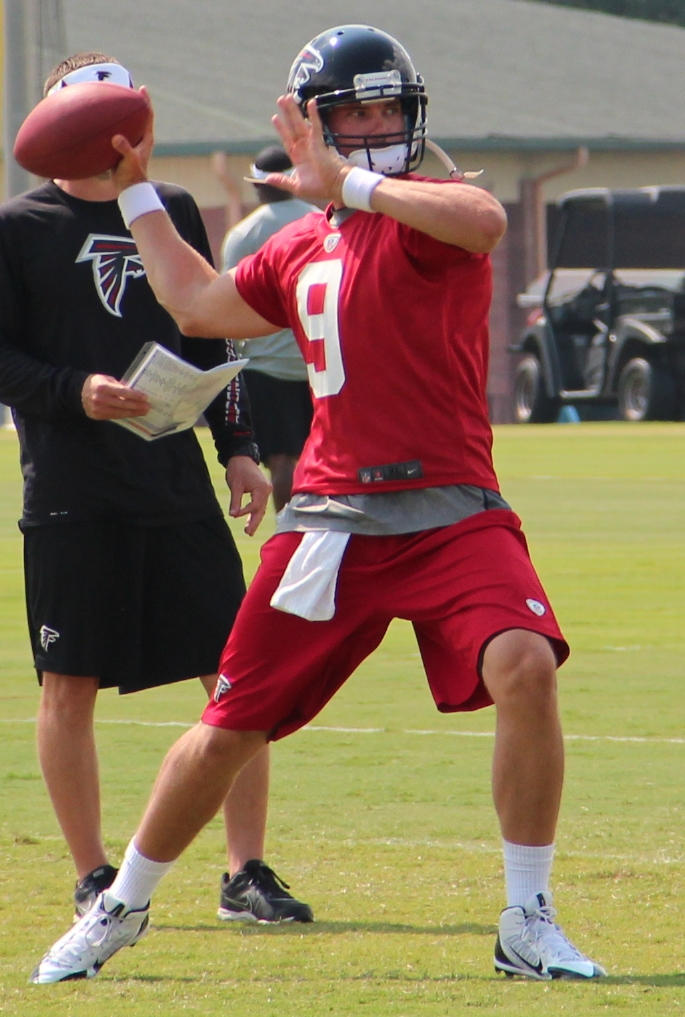
Seth Doege at Falcons training camp, 2013

The following week against conference opponent TCU, Doege surpassed his career high by throwing for seven touchdowns in a 56–53 triple-overtime win for Texas Tech. His touchdown pass to Alex Torres in the third overtime period gave Texas Tech the winning points. The game was the first for either school to extend into three overtime periods. Following the victory, Texas Tech rose to 14th in the BCS standings and Doege was named as a semifinalist for the Davey O'Brien Award. He was honored as the Capital One Cup Impact Player of the Week after his performance against TCU. Additionally, he earned ESPN/AT&T All-America Player of the Week honors for the third time of his career, and he began to be mentioned as being in the running for the Heisman Trophy.

Following losses and costly interceptions against Kansas State, Texas, Oklahoma State, and Baylor, Doege competed in a Red Raider victory over Minnesota in the 2012 Meineke Car Care Bowl of Texas. Doege was named the MVP for the game, throwing for 271 yards and one touchdown, and scoring one touchdown on a 4-yard run shortly before halftime. He completed a 35-yard touchdown to Eric Ward with 1:10 remaining to tie the game at 31–31, and the Red Raiders went on to win 34–31 with a last-second field goal.

In the final 2012 NCAA quarterback rankings, Doege finished third in passing yards with 4,205 and second in touchdown passes with 39, completing 380 of 541 passes (70.2%) on the season. With the conclusion of his college career, Doege ranks third in Texas Tech career history for passing yards (8,636), passing touchdowns (69), passing attempts (1187), and passing completions (819). Additionally, Doege became the second quarterback in Texas Tech history to pass for more than 4,000 yards in consecutive seasons, following former quarterback Graham Harrell.

After the 2012 season, Doege and teammate Cody Davis (safety) were selected to the West roster of the East-West Shrine Game, an all-star game for senior players played on January 19, 2013, at Tropicana Field in St. Petersburg, Florida.

=== Statistics ===
Season	Team	Games			Passing								Rushing			
Season	Team	GP	GS	Record	Cmp	Att	Pct	Yds	Y/A	TD	Int	Rtg	Att	Yds	Avg	TD
2008	Texas Tech	0	0	—	Redshirted (redshirt)											
2009	Texas Tech	4	1	1–0	38	61	62.3	369	6.0	2	0	123.9	11	–51	–4.6	0
2010	Texas Tech	2	0	—	3	4	75.0	58	14.5	0	0	196.8	0	0	0.0	0
2011	Texas Tech	12	12	5–7	398	581	68.5	4,004	6.9	28	10	138.9	54	46	0.9	4
2012	Texas Tech	13	13	8–5	380	541	70.2	4,205	7.8	39	16	153.4	48	59	1.2	2
Career		31	26	14–12	819	1,187	69.0	8,636	7.3	69	26	144.9	113	54	0.5	6

== Professional career ==
Doege went undrafted in the 2013 NFL draft, but shortly after the draft, signed a free agent contract with the Atlanta Falcons. He was waived on August 25, 2013, but was signed to the practice squad.

In 2014, Doege was signed by the Canadian Football League's Saskatchewan Roughriders. On October 3, 2014, he made his first professional start. He appeared in four games for the Roughriders in the 2014 season; completing 14 of 31 pass attempts for 150 yards, with no touchdowns and five interceptions. He was released by the Roughriders on April 24, 2015.

== Coaching ==
Following his release from the CFL, Doege was hired on as a graduate assistant for head coach Mike Jinks with Bowling Green. In 2019, he joined Jinks at USC as an offensive quality-control analyst. In 2022, he was hired as an offensive analyst at Ole Miss, by former USC head coach Lane Kiffin. On December 5, 2023, he was announced as offensive coordinator and quarterbacks coach at Marshall University.

== Personal life ==
Doege's younger brother Jarret is a quarterback for the Hamilton Tiger-Cats.
