= Michael Crabtree =

American football player (born 1987)

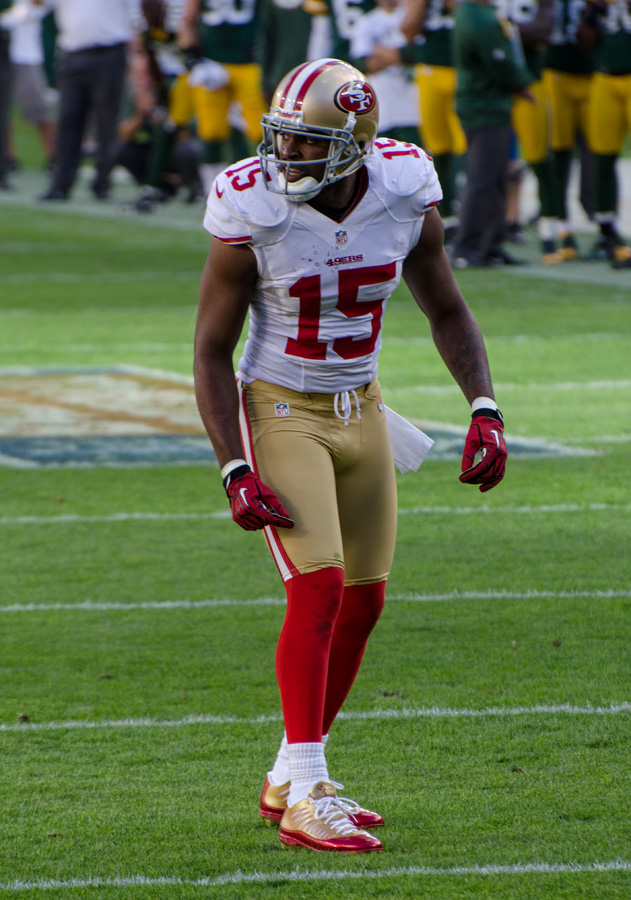
- Crabtree with the San Francisco 49ers in 2012

No. 15
- Position: Wide receiver

Personal information
- Born: September 14, 1987 (age 39); Dallas, Texas, U.S.
- Listed height: 6 ft 1 in (1.85 m)
- Listed weight: 215 lb (98 kg)

Career information
- High school: Dallas Carter
- College: Texas Tech (2006–2008)
- NFL draft: 2009: 1st round, 10th overall pick

Career history
- San Francisco 49ers (2009–2014); Oakland Raiders (2015–2017); Baltimore Ravens (2018); Arizona Cardinals (2019)

Awards and highlights
- 2× Biletnikoff Award (2007, 2008); 2× Paul Warfield Trophy (2007, 2008); 2× Unanimous All-American (2007, 2008); NCAA receptions leader (2007); NCAA receiving yards leader (2007); NCAA receiving touchdowns leader (2007); 2× First-team All-Big 12 (2007, 2008); Big 12 Co-Offensive Freshman of the Year (2007)

Career NFL statistics
- Receptions: 637
- Receiving yards: 7,499
- Receiving touchdowns: 54
- Stats at Pro Football Reference
- College Football Hall of Fame

Michael Alex Crabtree Jr. (born September 14, 1987) is an American former professional football player who was a wide receiver for 11 seasons in the National Football League (NFL). He played college football for the Texas Tech Red Raiders, twice earning unanimous All-American honors. He was selected 10th overall by the San Francisco 49ers in the 2009 NFL draft. Crabtree was a member of the 49ers for six seasons and spent the remainder of his career with the Oakland Raiders, Baltimore Ravens, and Arizona Cardinals.

== Early life ==
Crabtree was born in Dallas, Texas. He attended David W. Carter High School in Dallas where he played basketball, football, and ran track for the Cowboys program. Crabtree played as a quarterback for the Carter Cowboys high school football team. As a senior, he completed 45 of 100 passes for 870 yards and 11 touchdowns while also rushing 100 times for 646 yards and nine touchdowns. Crabtree was a four-star football recruit as an athlete.

Crabtree ranked among the top 51 recruits in the state of Texas going into college. During a visit in 2004, Texas Tech basketball coach Bob Knight asked Crabtree which sport he was going to choose. Though the decision was not an easy one, Crabtree opted to play college football exclusively.

Crabtree was offered football scholarships by Baylor, Illinois, Iowa, Kansas State, Oklahoma, Texas A&M, Texas Tech, and Kansas. He was also recruited by Texas, whose coaches wanted him to play defense. Crabtree refused, stating that he wanted to score touchdowns.

College recruiting
Name	Hometown	School	Height	Weight	40^{‡}	Commit date
Michael Crabtree; ATH	Dallas, Texas	Carter	6 ft 1 in (1.85 m)	190 lb (86 kg)	4.51	Jul 8, 2004
Michael Crabtree; ATH	Recruit ratings: Scout: Rivals:					
Overall recruit ranking: Scout: N/A Rivals: Overall: 240th State: 22nd Position: 16th
‡ Refers to 40-yard dash; Note: In many cases, Scout, Rivals, 247Sports, On3, and ESPN may conflict in their listings of height, weight and 40 time.; In these cases, the average was taken. ESPN grades are on a 100-point scale.; Sources: "2005 Team Ranking". Rivals.com.

== College career ==
Crabtree accepted an athletic scholarship to attend Texas Tech University, where he played for coach Mike Leach and the Texas Tech Red Raiders football team from 2006 to 2008.

=== Freshman season ===
Crabtree was redshirted during his 2006 true freshman season because of a transcript glitch and a position change from quarterback to wide receiver.

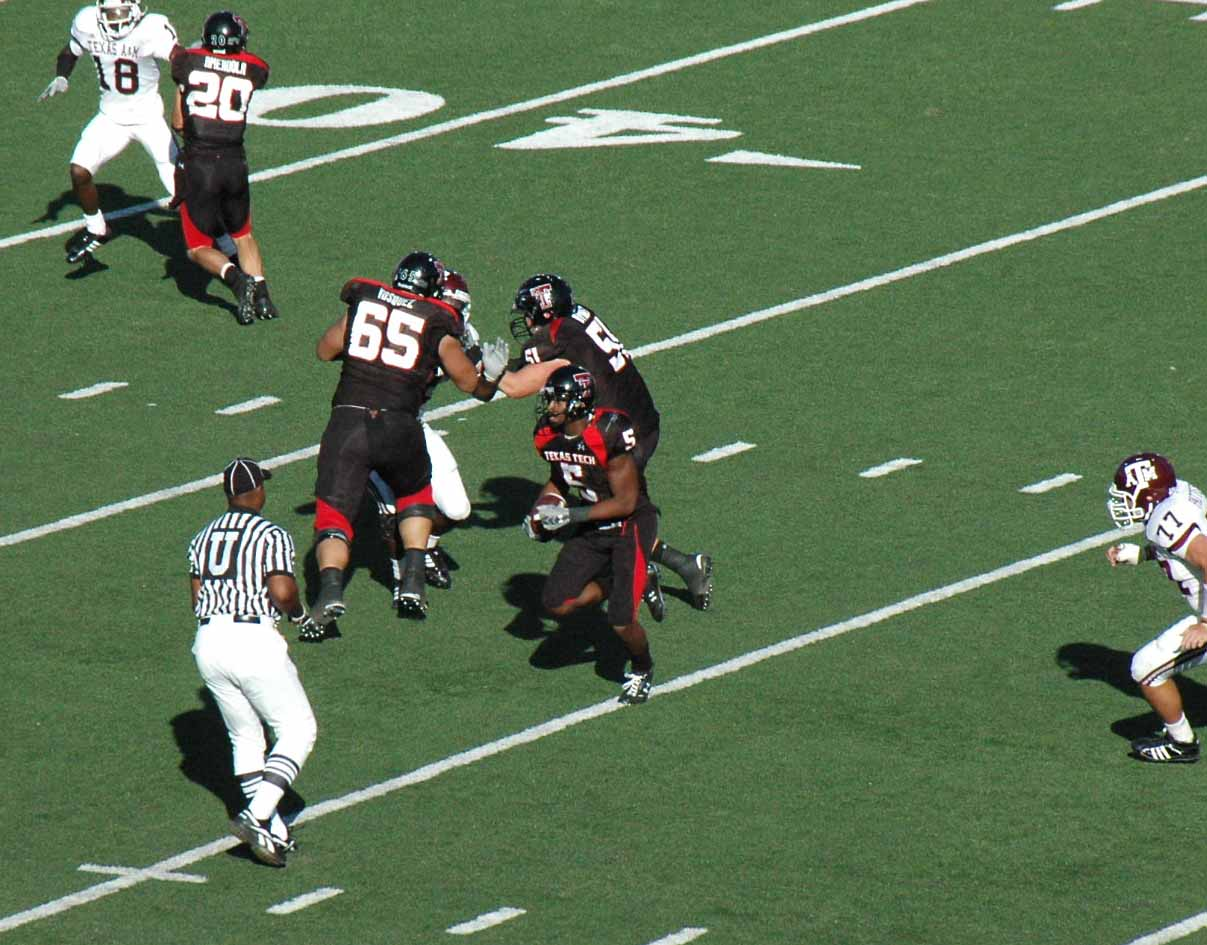
Crabtree breaks free on the "jailbreak" screen for Texas Tech in their win over Texas A&M in 2007

In 2007, Crabtree started his redshirt-freshman season against SMU. In his first game, the Red Raiders won 49–9, and Crabtree stood out with 12 receptions for 106 yards and three touchdowns. The following week, in a 45–31 win over UTEP, Crabtree had 15 receptions for 188 yards and two touchdowns. Against the Rice Owls, he recorded 11 receptions for 244 yards and three touchdowns. In Tech's first loss of the season, against Oklahoma State, he had 14 receptions for 237 yards and three touchdowns. During a 75–7 victory over Northwestern State, Crabtree caught eight passes for 145 yards and three touchdowns in only two and a half quarters of playing time. Against Iowa State, Crabtree had 10 receptions for 154 yards and three touchdowns.

During the Iowa State game, Crabtree broke the season record for most touchdown receptions by a freshman receiver. The previous record of 14 was shared by Jabar Gaffney in 2000, Mike Williams in 2002, and Davone Bess in 2005. In the October 13, 2007, game, Crabtree had eight receptions for 170 yards during the 35–7 victory over the Texas A&M Aggies. This brought his total yardage to 1,244. In the next game, against Missouri, he again did not score but still added 76 more yards on ten catches. In spite of having two consecutive games without a touchdown, CBS Sports still ranked Crabtree as the top freshman in the nation.

During the game against Colorado, Crabtree made his 99th reception. This set three records simultaneously—most single-season receptions by a freshman in I-A, most single-season receptions by a Red Raider, and most single-season touchdowns by a Big 12 player (18). Crabtree finished his freshman season with 134 receptions for 1,962 yards and 22 touchdowns.

=== Sophomore season ===
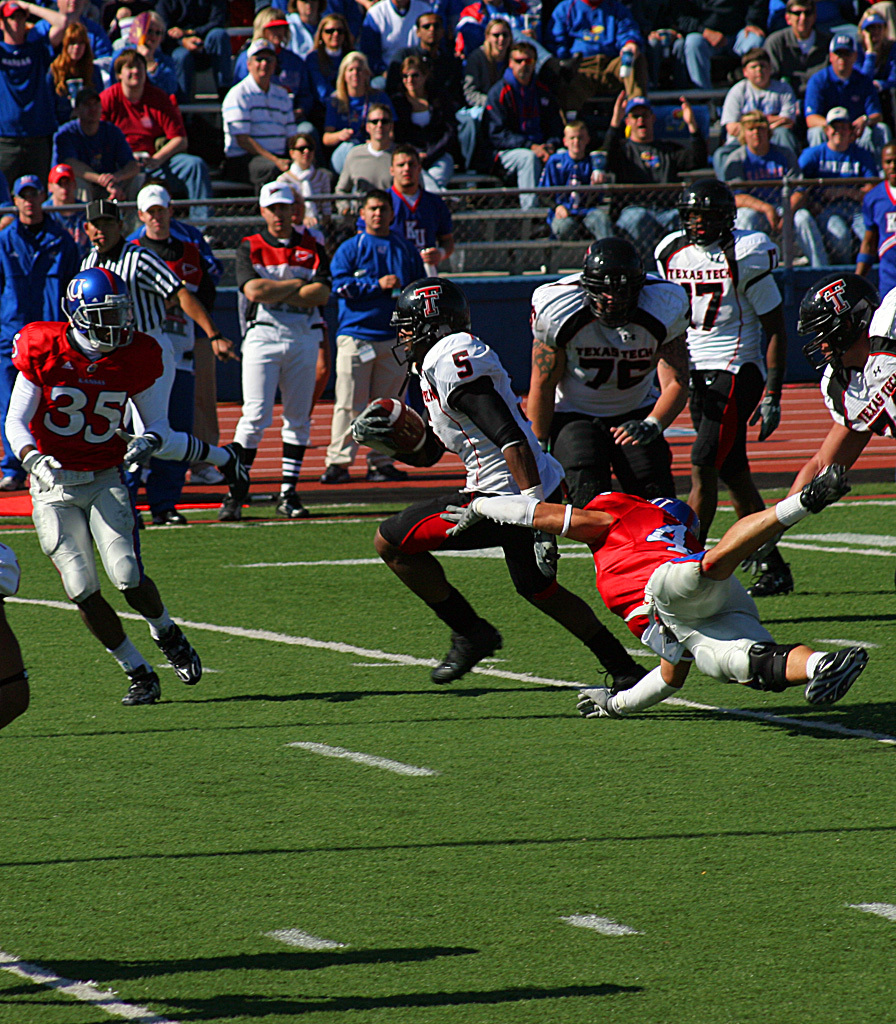
Crabtree in action during the Texas Tech at Kansas game in 2008

Before the beginning of his sophomore season, CBS Sports listed Crabtree as a Heisman hopeful. Tech quarterback Graham Harrell's name also appeared on the list. Crabtree, along with Harrell and head coach Mike Leach, were featured on the cover of the 2008 edition of Dave Campbell's Texas Football. His name has also appeared on the Maxwell Award preseason watchlist along with Harrell. To support the Heisman campaign of both Harrell and Crabtree, Texas Tech created a website called PassOrCatch2008.com, which is modelled after political campaigns. The site has garnered national attention and was awarded a Telly Award which honors the best in local, regional, and cable commercials and programs, as well as online videos, films, and commercials. Crabtree finished fifth in the Heisman race behind Harrell at fourth.

Crabtree began his sophomore campaign in the 49–24 victory over Eastern Washington, recording nine receptions for 73 yards and a touchdown in limited playing time. In the next game against Nevada, he had seven receptions for 158 yards and an 82-yard touchdown during the 35–19 victory. Crabtree was selected as the AT&T ESPN All-America Player of the Week for his performance in the 43–7 victory over Southern Methodist after catching eight passes for a season-high 164 yards and three touchdowns.

During a 56–14 victory over Massachusetts, Crabtree recorded five receptions for 62 yards and a touchdown in limited playing time. In the next game against Kansas State, he caught nine passes for 107 yards and two touchdowns during the 58–28 victory. The Red Raiders then defeated Nebraska 37–31, where Crabtree had five receptions for 89 yards and two touchdowns. In the following 43–25 win over Texas A&M, he recorded eight receptions for 71 yards and two touchdowns while also compiling his first kickoff return of his career in the game, running the ball for 50 yards. However, Crabtree tweaked his left ankle during the return and hobbled off the field.

Crabtree partially recovered from his ankle sprain enough to play at Kansas, where he recorded nine receptions for 70 yards and two touchdowns in a 63–21 Tech victory. The Red Raiders then upset #1 Texas 39–33. Down 33–32, Tech drove down into the Longhorns' territory with eight seconds left in the game. Quarterback Graham Harrell threw to Crabtree in double coverage inside the 10-yard line. Crabtree grabbed the pass, shook a defender on the sideline, and ran into the endzone for the game-winning touchdown with a second left in the game. As the Red Raiders won, Crabtree finished with 10 receptions for 127 yards and the aforementioned touchdown. Against Oklahoma State, Crabtree had eight receptions for 89 yards and three touchdowns. He extended his streak of at least five receptions and a touchdown catch to 13 games, placing him in a tie for second-longest all time. In these three games, Crabtree hobbled off the field at times after making catches. He used the bye week before the Oklahoma game to fully recover from the injury. On December 2, 2008, Crabtree and teammate Graham Harrell were named as Walter Camp Award finalists. Crabtree started the year with the expectation that he would compete for the Heisman Trophy, but finished fifth in the Heisman voting, garnering three first place votes.

On April 23, 2009, EA Sports announced that Crabtree would be featured on the cover of NCAA Football 10 for Xbox 360. Cover athletes for the other editions of the game are Brian Johnson of the Utah Utes (PlayStation 3), Brian Orakpo of the Texas Longhorns (PlayStation 2), and Mark Sanchez of the USC Trojans (PlayStation Portable). The game was available in stores beginning July 14, 2009.

== Professional career ==
=== Pre-draft ===
Pre-draft measurables
Height	Weight	Arm length	Hand span	Wonderlic
6 ft 1 3/8 in (1.86 m)	215 lb (98 kg)	34 1/4 in (0.87 m)	9 1/4 in (0.23 m)	15
All values from NFL Combine

Shortly before the deadline, Crabtree declared himself eligible for the 2009 NFL draft, after discussions with his coach Mike Leach, and with representatives of the NFL who advised that "he would be a first-round pick". At the press conference to announce his plans to enter the NFL Draft, Crabtree was accompanied by his Texas Tech Red Raider teammate Brandon Williams, who made a similar announcement. Williams had led the Big 12 Conference in sacks. NFL Draft analyst Mel Kiper Jr. had projected Crabtree to be selected by the Seattle Seahawks as the fourth overall pick.

On February 21, 2009, it was reported that Crabtree sustained a severe Jones fracture in his left foot, which would require surgery to insert a screw and would leave him unable to perform for the next six to 10 weeks, including the NFL Combine and Texas Tech's pro day. Doctors found that the injury had happened recently, and possibly during Crabtree's training for the combine. However, he stated that the stress fracture had been there for a year and did not cause him pain. On March 1, Crabtree stated he would have surgery and forgo the workout at Texas Tech's pro day on March 26.

At the 2009 NFL Combine, Crabtree weighed 214 pounds (97 kg); his height was reported at 6 ft 1 3/8 in (1.864 m). He later scored 15 on the Wonderlic Test.

=== San Francisco 49ers ===
Crabtree was selected in the first round (10th overall) by the San Francisco 49ers in the 2009 NFL draft. He was the highest drafted Texas Tech Red Raider since halfback Donny Anderson went seventh overall in the 1965 NFL draft. On July 28, 2009, Crabtree failed to report for training camp because he had no contract. Crabtree's training camp no show was the first for a rookie since 2005. Sources close to Crabtree indicated that he was prepared to sit out the 2009 season and re-enter the 2010 NFL Draft. Crabtree's agent, Eugene Parker, stated that he denied threatening the 49ers with having Crabtree sit out the season and reenter the draft. On August 30, Crabtree became the last holdout and unsigned draft pick from the 2009 NFL draft when Andre Smith, the sixth overall pick, signed with the Bengals. That day was also the 32nd day of Crabtree's holdout, and only 10 days short of the all-time long holdout for any 49ers rookie in the franchise's history. Beat reporter Matt Maiocco had reported rumors that the signing could have happened around Labor Day, but that did not occur as the sides remained at a complete impasse. Over Labor Day weekend Deion Sanders, an NFL reporter and Crabtree counselor, stated on the NFL Total Access show that Crabtree was indeed willing to sit out the entire season. Sanders also claimed that the rookie receiver was not in "dire need" of money at that time. By September 9, Crabtree set a 49ers record by becoming the longest rookie holdout in franchise history. The last first-round draft pick to hold out for an entire season was quarterback Kelly Stouffer in 1987 when he refused to sign with the Cardinals. Stouffer was eventually traded in April 1988 to the Seahawks for three draft picks, including a first pick in the 1989 draft. The 49ers would have had the option to trade the rights to Crabtree only after March 1, 2010, and up until the next draft. If a team were to trade for the rights, that team would not be able to sign such a player before the 2010 NFL draft. If he was not signed by the 49ers and then traded to another team, his contract would have then counted against that team's 2010 rookie pool.

==== 2009 season ====
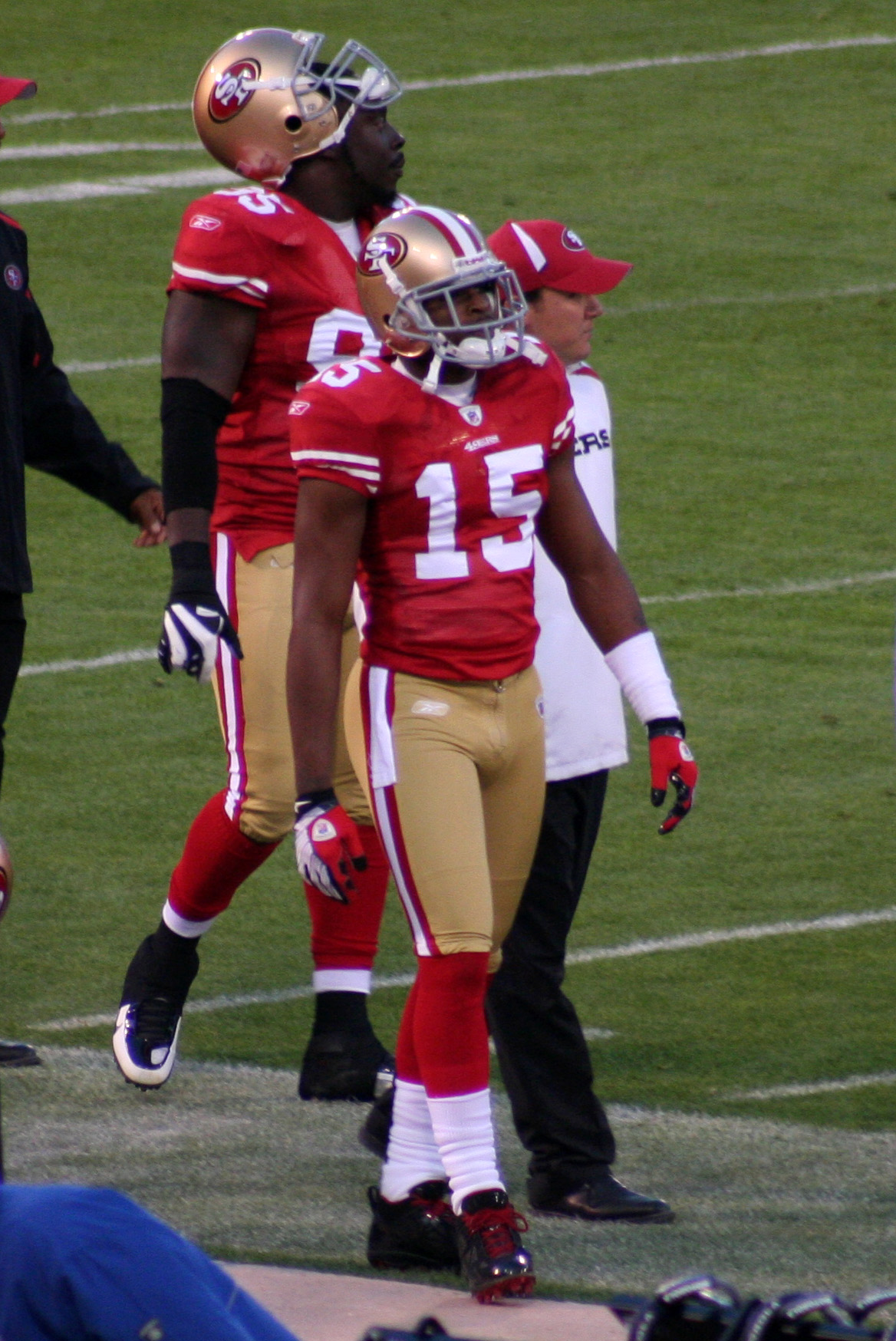
Crabtree in 2009

On September 21, 2009, the 49ers filed charges against the New York Jets for attempting to tamper with their negotiations with Crabtree. The 49ers may have believed the Jets contacted Crabtree's agent to let him know they'd be interested in trading for his rights, or in drafting him in 2010 with a better salary than the 49ers were offering. The 49ers had until November 17 to sign Crabtree or he wouldn't have been allowed to play in the 2009 season along with its being considered a non-accrued season for contract purposes.

On October 7, 2009, ESPN reported that Crabtree and the 49ers had agreed to a six-year contract. ESPN's Adam Schefter reported the deal would be worth $32 million, with $17 million guaranteed, $8 million more than offered by the team in August 2009, but also a year longer. The contract can void to five years based on Pro Bowl and playing time triggers.

On October 25, Crabtree made his first career NFL start against the Houston Texans, catching five passes for 56 yards and playing more snaps than any other 49ers receiver. On November 22, Crabtree caught his first touchdown on a 38-yard pass from quarterback Alex Smith, beating veteran All-Pro cornerback Al Harris on the play. He caught his second touchdown pass, and his first touchdown at Candlestick Park, against the Arizona Cardinals in a Week 14 divisional matchup. Crabtree led all rookie receivers in yards per game, with 56.8.

==== 2010 season ====
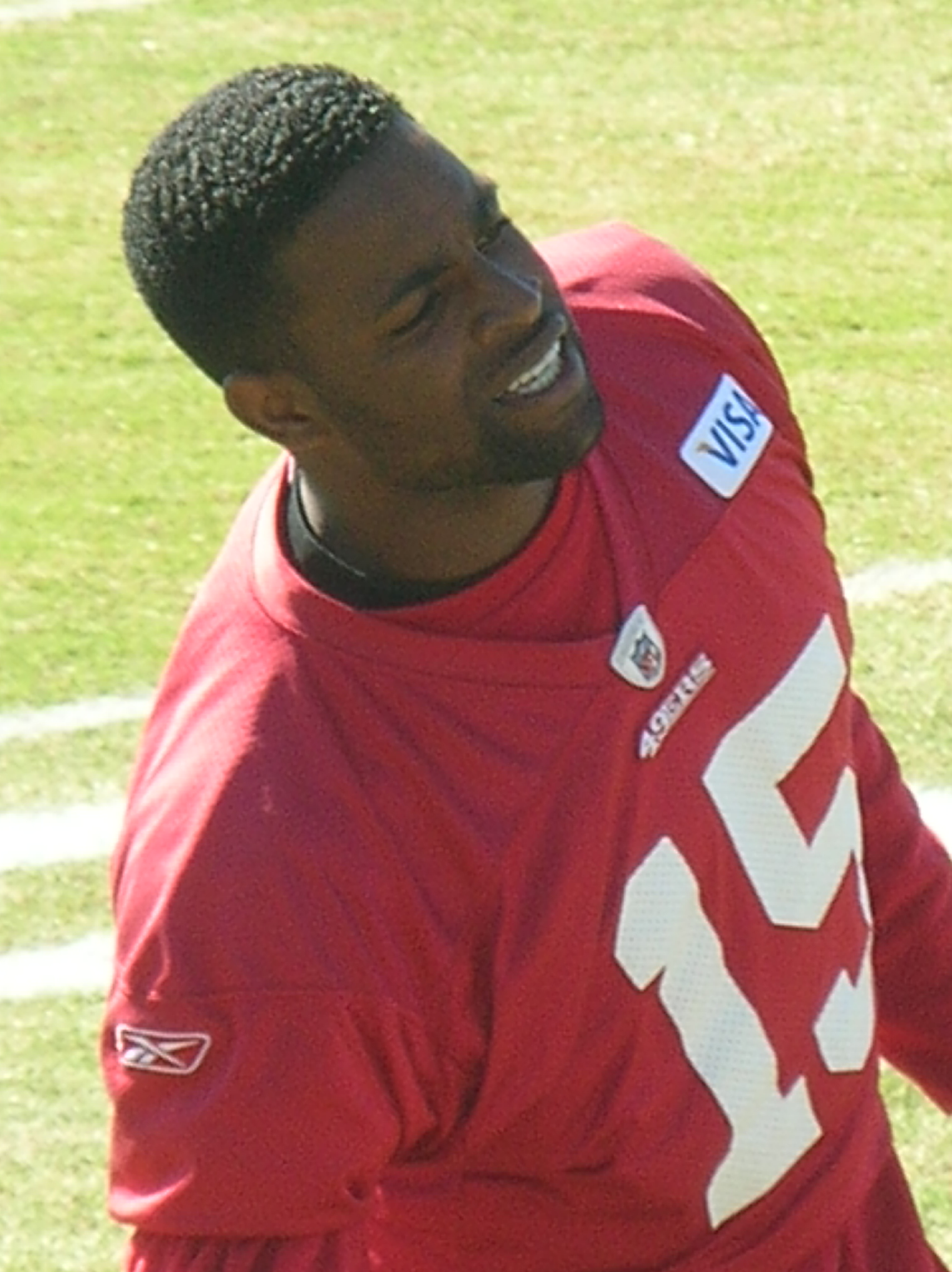
Crabtree at 49ers training camp in August 2010

During the season opener against the Seattle Seahawks, Crabtree caught two passes for 12 yards (a career low). It was the first time in his career that he did not record at least three receptions in a game. In the home opener on Monday Night Football against the New Orleans Saints he caught 1 pass (career low) for 32 yards. On October 10, 2010, Crabtree recorded his first career 100+-yard game, recording nine receptions for 105 yards and a seven-yard touchdown. He caught the go-ahead 32-yard touchdown against Oakland in Week 6. It was the first time Crabtree caught a touchdown in consecutive games. During Week 16 against the St. Louis Rams, he recorded a career-high 60-yard touchdown reception in the second quarter of the 25–17 loss.

Crabtree finished his second professional season with 55 receptions for 741 yards and six touchdowns in 16 games and 15 starts.

==== 2011 season ====
Crabtree suffered a broken foot during player-only off-season workouts in 2011. He underwent surgery and missed the entire preseason. In the first game of the regular season against the Seahawks, he was still not fully recovered from his injury and sat out the second half of that game and the next game against the Dallas Cowboys. Crabtree caught his first touchdown of the season during a Week 8 20–10 victory over the Cleveland Browns. His second touchdown reception occurred in a home game against the St. Louis Rams on a 52-yard pass from Alex Smith. In the regular season finale in St. Louis, Crabtree recorded the first multi-touchdown game of his NFL career with two touchdown receptions, one of which came from kicker David Akers on a fake field goal. Crabtree finished the season with a career-high in both receptions (72) and receiving yards (874). In the playoffs, Crabtree caught a five-yard touchdown pass in the Divisional Round against the New Orleans Saints to give the 49ers an early 14–0 lead. However, in that game and NFC Championship Game against the New York Giants, he totaled only five receptions for 28 yards.

==== 2012 season ====
In 2012, Crabtree posted his first season with greater than 1,000 receiving yards as he continued to develop as a player and grow into his role as the number-one target in the 49ers' passing game. Following Colin Kaepernick's ascension to the starting quarterback position, Crabtree became a greater focal point of the offense, as Kaepernick's ability enabled more down-field passing. Crabtree began to put up better numbers with Kaepernick at the helm. Late in the season, Crabtree showed dominance with 107 yards and two touchdowns against the New England Patriots and a career-high 172 yards and two touchdowns against the Arizona Cardinals. Crabtree finished with career highs in targets, receptions, yards and touchdowns. In the postseason, Crabtree had nine catches for 119 yards and two touchdowns in a 49ers victory over the Green Bay Packers in the Divisional Round, as well as six receptions for 57 yards in the NFC Championship Game win over the Atlanta Falcons. Crabtree had five receptions for 109 yards and a touchdown in the Super Bowl XLVII loss to the Baltimore Ravens by a score of 34–31.

==== 2013 season ====
On May 22, 2013, Crabtree underwent surgery to repair a torn Achilles tendon. The surgery required a minimum of six months to recover. On August 27, the 49ers placed Crabtree on the reserve/physically unable to perform list. He was most likely to return to the field in mid-November 2013.

On November 25, 2013, rumors circulated online that he would be activated since November 26 would be the deadline for the team to activate him or face benching him for the rest of the season. On November 26, 2013, the 49ers activated him and waived a backup quarterback to make room for him on the 53-man roster. Crabtree played his first game of the season in Week 13 against the St. Louis Rams, making two receptions for 68 yards in the 23–13 victory. Crabtree caught his first and only touchdown of the season against the Tampa Bay Buccaneers. In the Wild Card Round of the playoffs, Crabtree had eight receptions for 125 yards in the 23–20 victory over Green Bay. On January 19, 2014, a pass to Crabtree from Kaepernick in the final seconds of the NFC Championship Game against the Seahawks was tipped by Richard Sherman and intercepted by Malcolm Smith as the 49ers lost 23–17.

==== 2014 season ====
During a Week 3 23–14 loss to the Arizona Cardinals, Crabtree recorded a career-high 10 receptions for 80 yards and a touchdown.

Crabtree finished his 49ers career with 347 receptions for 4,327 yards and 26 touchdowns.

=== Oakland Raiders ===
On April 13, 2015, after becoming a free agent, Crabtree signed a one-year, $3.2 million contract with the Oakland Raiders. The contract also included $1.8 million in incentives.

==== 2015 season ====
Crabtree began the 2015 season recording 5 receptions for 46 yards in the season opener against the Cincinnati Bengals. In the next game against the Baltimore Ravens, Crabtree caught nine passes for 111 yards and a touchdown. During Week 9 against the Pittsburgh Steelers, Crabtree had seven receptions for 108 yards and two touchdowns.

On December 9, 2015, Crabtree and the Raiders agreed to a four-year, $35 million extension. Crabtree finished the 2015 season with 85 receptions for 922 yards and nine touchdowns.

==== 2016 season ====
In the 2016 season, Crabtree had his second career 1,000-yard season and his first since 2012. In the season opener against the New Orleans Saints, Crabtree scored the Raiders' go-ahead two-point conversion on a pass from Derek Carr late in the fourth quarter of the narrow 35–34 victory. During Week 4 against the Baltimore Ravens, Crabtree had seven receptions for 88 yards and a career-high three touchdowns in the narrow 28–27 road victory. Crabtree finished the 2016 season with a career-high 89 receptions for 1,003 yards and eight touchdowns. He had three games on the season with over 100 receiving yards.

==== 2017 season ====
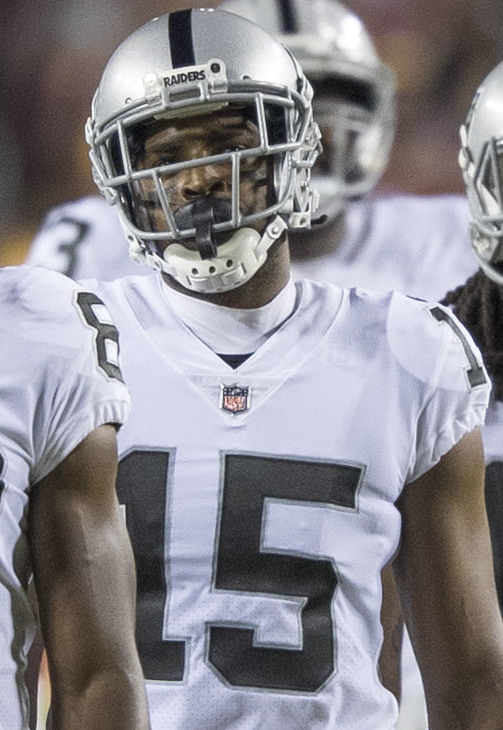
Crabtree in 2017

During Week 2 against the New York Jets, Crabtree had six receptions for 80 yards and a career-high tying three touchdowns in the 45–20 victory. During Week 7 against the Kansas City Chiefs, Crabtree had three catches for 24 yards and the game-winning touchdown from Derek Carr as time expired. During a Week 12 21–14 victory against the Denver Broncos, Crabtree got into a fight with cornerback Aqib Talib, resulting in both players being ejected. The next day, both combatants were suspended for two games. However, the suspension was reduced to one game following a joint appeal. Crabtree finished the 2017 season with 58 receptions for 618 yards and six touchdowns.

On March 15, 2018, Crabtree was released by the Raiders after spending three seasons with the team after the team signed Jordy Nelson. Crabtree finished his Raiders career with 232 catches for 2,543 yards and 25 receiving touchdowns.

=== Baltimore Ravens ===
On March 16, 2018, Crabtree signed a three-year, $21 million contract with the Baltimore Ravens, with $11 million guaranteed.

Crabtree was part of a receiving unit that included Willie Snead IV and John Brown. In his Ravens debut, Crabtree recorded three receptions for 38 yards and a touchdown in a 47–3 victory over the Buffalo Bills. During Week 6 against the Tennessee Titans, he had six receptions for 93 yards and his second touchdown of the season in the 21–0 shutout road victory. Crabtree finished the regular season with 54 receptions for 607 yards and three touchdowns. During the Wild Card Round against the Los Angeles Chargers, Crabtree had two receptions for 38 yards, both for touchdowns, as the Ravens lost 23–17.

On February 25, 2019, Crabtree was released by the Ravens.

=== Arizona Cardinals ===
On August 21, 2019, Crabtree signed a one-year contract with the Arizona Cardinals. He appeared in two games for Arizona (including one start), recording four receptions for 22 scoreless yards. Crabtree was released by the Cardinals on September 23.

== Career statistics ==
Legend
**Bold**	Career high

=== NFL ===
==== Regular season ====
Year	Team	Games		Receiving					Rushing					Fumbles	
Year	Team	GP	GS	Rec	Yds	Avg	Lng	TD	Att	Yds	Avg	Lng	TD	Fum	Lost
2009	SF	11	11	48	625	13.0	50	2	—	—	—	—	—	1	**1**
2010	SF	16	15	55	741	13.5	**60T**	6	—	—	—	—	—	0	0
2011	SF	15	14	72	874	12.1	52T	4	**1**	6	6.0	0	0	0	0
2012	SF	16	16	85	**1,105**	13.0	49T	**9**	**1**	**8**	**8.0**	0	0	0	0
2013	SF	5	5	19	284	**14.9**	**60**	1	—	—	—	—	—	0	0
2014	SF	16	16	68	698	10.3	51	4	**1**	4	4.0	0	0	0	0
2015	OAK	16	15	85	922	10.8	38T	**9**	—	—	—	—	—	1	0
2016	OAK	16	16	**89**	1,003	12.1	56	8	—	—	—	—	—	**2**	0
2017	OAK	14	14	58	618	10.7	41	8	—	—	—	—	—	1	0
2018	BAL	16	16	54	607	11.2	27	3	—	—	—	—	—	0	0
2019	ARI	2	1	4	22	5.5	9	0	—	—	—	—	—	0	0
Career		143	138	637	7,499	11.8	60T	54	3	18	6.0	0	0	6	1

==== Postseason ====
Year	Team	Games		Receiving					Rushing					Fumbles	
Year	Team	GP	GS	Rec	Yds	Avg	Lng	TD	Att	Yds	Avg	Lng	TD	Fum	Lost
2011	SF	2	2	5	28	5.6	9	1	—	—	—	—	—	0	0
2012	SF	3	3	**20**	**285**	14.3	**33**	**3**	—	—	—	—	—	**1**	0
2013	SF	3	2	15	203	13.5	31	0	—	—	—	—	—	**1**	0
2016	OAK	1	1	2	33	16.5	19	0	—	—	—	—	—	0	0
2018	BAL	1	1	2	38	**19.0**	31T	2	—	—	—	—	—	0	0
Career		10	9	44	587	13.3	33	6	0	0	0.0	0	0	2	0

=== College ===
Legend
Led the NCAA

Season	Team	GP	Receiving			
Season	Team	GP	Rec	Yds	Avg	TD
2007	Texas Tech	13	**134**	**1,962**	**14.6**	**22**
2008	Texas Tech	13	97	1,165	12.0	19
College totals		26	231	3,127	13.5	41

== Career highlights ==
=== College awards ===
Crabtree has received multiple honors due to his accomplishments at Texas Tech. In addition to being a two-time unanimous first-team All-American, Crabtree is a two-time Biletnikoff Award and Paul Warfield Award winner. He is one of only five Red Raiders in school history have earned unanimous All-American honors. The other four to receive the honor are: Mark Bounds in 1991, Zach Thomas in 1995, Byron Hanspard in 1996, and Jace Amaro in 2013.

Recognition
Season	Honor	Status	Notes
2007	All-Big 12	Selected for first-team	
2007	AFCA Coaches' All-America	Selected	One of two wide receivers selected; first Freshman to earn the honor since Herschel Walker in 1980
2007	AP All-America	Selected for first-team	Garnered Unanimous All-America status by being selected for a fifth NCAA-recognized All-America team
2007	AP Big 12 Offensive Newcomer of the Year	Selected	
2007	AT&T ESPN All-America Player of the Year	Winner	First freshman to win the award
2007	Biletnikoff Award	Winner	First freshman and first Big 12 player ever chosen for the honor
2007	CBSSports.com All-America	Selected to first-team	
2007	CBSSports.com Freshman of the Year	Selected	Unanimous first place selection
2007	ESPN All-America	Selected	
2007	FWAA All-America	Selected for team	
2007	Maxwell Award	Chosen as a semifinalist	Only freshman chosen as semifinalist in 2007
2007	Paul Warfield Award	Winner	
2007	Rivals.com National Freshman of the Year	Selected	
2007	SI.com All-America	Selected for first-team	
2007	Sporting News All-America	Selected for first-team	Garnered Consensus All-America status by being selected for a third NCAA-recognized All-America team
2007	Sporting News Big 12 All-Freshman Team	Selected	
2007	Touchdown Club of Columbus Freshman of the Year	Selected	
2007	Walter Camp All-America	Selected for first-team	
2008	Playboy All-America	Selected	
2008	Preseason All-Big 12	Selected for first-team	Only unanimous selection
2008	All-Big 12	Selected for first-team	Only offensive unanimous selection
2008	AFCA Coaches' All-America	Selected	One of three returnees from last year's list
2008	Biletnikoff Award	Winner	First ever two-time winner
2008	Walter Camp All-America	Selected for first-team	
2008	FWAA All-America	Selected for team	Garnered Consensus All-America status by being selected for a third NCAA-recognized All-America team
2008	SI.com All-America	Selected for first-team	
2008	AP All-America	Selected for first-team	
2008	Sporting News All-America	Selected for first-team	Garnered Unanimous All-America status by being selected for a fifth NCAA-recognized All-America team
2008	Paul Warfield Award	Winner	
2008	NCAA Football 10 cover athlete	Xbox 360 release	

=== NCAA records ===
After only two seasons at Texas Tech, Crabtree was able to achieve eight NCAA records. See also NCAA records held by individual Red Raiders

NCAA record	Statistic
Most passes caught by two players same team, season	243 (2007) with Danny Amendola
Most passes caught by a freshman, season	134 (2007)
Most passes caught by a freshman, season per game	10.3 (2007) (134 in 13 games)
Most yards gained by a freshman, season	1,962 (2007)
Most yards gained by a freshman, season per game	150.9 (2007)
Most games gaining 100 yards or more by a freshman, season	11 (2007)
Most touchdown passes caught by a freshman	22 (2007)
Most touchdown passes caught in freshman and sophomore seasons	41 (2007 (22) & 2008 (19))

The NCAA Record book also mentions Michael Crabtree for the following items:

- Season Receptions: 134 (Rank 8th) 2007
- Season Receptions per game: 10.31 (Rank 10th) 2007
- Season Yards: 1,962 (Rank 3rd) 2007
- Season Yards Per Game: 150.9 (Rank 5th) 2007
- Season Touchdown Receptions: 22 (Rank 7th) 2007
- Season Touchdown Receptions: 19 (Rank 15th) 2008
- Career Receptions Per Game: 8.89 (Rank 5th)
- Career Yards Per Game: 120.3 (Rank 5th)
- Career Touchdown Receptions: 41 (Rank 10th)
- Annual Champion Receptions per Game: 2007
- Annual Champion Receiving Yards Per Game: 2007
- Career Points Per Game: 9.46 (Rank 19th)

NCAA Records Reference (Last referenced for 2015 season)

== Endorsements ==
In 2012, Crabtree partnered with Ubisoft, makers of the video game, The Hip Hop Dance Experience, to create a touchdown celebration dance inspired by the video game. Each time Crabtree performed his signature dance move "The Crab Shake" on the field, Ubisoft made a charitable donation to the Boys & Girls Club of San Francisco.

Crabtree teamed up with Subway restaurants in 2009 in his first national endorsement. The deal involved a variety of endeavors including personal appearances and behind-the-scenes webisodes which debuted the week of the 2009 NFL Draft. His other contracts include EA Sports, Jordan Brand, three trading card companies, and MogoTXT.

== Personal life ==
Texas Tech University honored Crabtree by incorporating a large mural of Crabtree as part of a $51.1 million expansion to the Jones AT&T Stadium. The mural is located on the east side of the stadium inside the concession area. Crabtree's image is also displayed prominently in the football training facility.

On September 18, 2021, Crabtree was inducted into the Texas Tech Football Ring of Honor.

== See also ==
- List of NCAA major college football yearly receiving leaders
- List of NCAA Division I FBS career receiving touchdowns leaders
