= Art Kaufman =

American football player and coach (born 1957)

Biographical details
- Born: December 23, 1957 (age 68); Dermott, Arkansas, U.S.

Playing career
- 1976–1980: Arkansas–Monticello
- Position: Linebacker

Coaching career (HC unless noted)
- 1982: Delta State (GA)
- 1983–1986: Northwestern State (OLB)
- 1987: Northwestern State (DC/LB)
- 1988–1991: Ole Miss (DE/OLB)
- 1992–1994: Louisiana Tech (DC/LB)
- 1995–2000: Ole Miss (DC/LB)
- 2001–2002: Arkansas Tech (DC/LB)
- 2003–2004: East Carolina (DL)
- 2005–2007: Middle Tennessee (LB)
- 2008: Southern Miss (DL/ST)
- 2009–2010: North Carolina (LB)
- 2011: North Carolina (DC/LB)
- 2012: Texas Tech (DC/LB)
- 2013: Cincinnati (DC/LB)
- 2014–2016: California (DC)

Art Kaufman is an American former college football coach. He was the defensive coordinator for the California Golden Bears. He had been employed as the defensive coordinator for the North Carolina Tar Heels and the Texas Tech Red Raiders.

== Career ==
Kaufman graduated from the University of Arkansas at Monticello, playing at the linebacker position for the Boll Weevils. During his playing career, he was named an All-American twice. After graduating in 1980, he served as a graduate assistant for Delta State University. In 1983, he received his first full-time coaching position as outside linebackers coach for Northwestern State. He held the position until 1987, when he was promoted to defensive coordinator in addition to his linebacker coaching duties.

In 1988, Kaufman accepted a position as outside linebackers and defensive ends coach at Ole Miss. During his tenure as linebacker/defensive ends coach, the Rebels made appearances in the 1989 Liberty Bowl and the 1991 Gator Bowl. Kaufman remained at Ole Miss for several seasons, before becoming the defensive coordinator and linebacker coach for the Louisiana Tech Bulldogs for the 1992–1994 seasons.

In 1995, he returned to Ole Miss as the new defensive coordinator under then first-time head coach Tommy Tuberville. Kaufman remained at the position for two years after Tuberville's departure to Auburn. From 1997 to 2000, under his tenure, Ole Miss appeared in four straight bowl games: the 1997 Motor City Bowl, the 1998 Independence Bowl, the 1999 Independence Bowl, and the 2000 Music City Bowl. Additionally, in 1999 Kaufman's defense ranked fourth nationally in rushing defense.

For the 2001 and 2002 seasons, Kaufman was the defensive coordinator and linebackers coach for Arkansas Tech. He coached the 2003–04 seasons as linebackers coach for the East Carolina Pirates, and spent the 2005–07 seasons as the linebackers coach at Middle Tennessee.

He then coached the 2008 season as the defensive line and special teams coach for Southern Miss, before accepting a position once again as linebackers coach for the North Carolina Tar Heels. Kaufman was promoted to defensive coordinator of the Tar Heels by interim head coach Everett Withers, filling the spot Withers had vacated upon the firing of head coach Butch Davis. In the 2009 season, Kaufman was named to the list of finalists for the Broyles Award given to the top assistant in college football.

=== Texas Tech ===
On January 10, 2012, Kaufman was announced as the new defensive coordinator for the Texas Tech Red Raiders and former employer Tommy Tuberville, replacing Chad Glasgow. He is the fourth defensive coordinator in four years for Texas Tech, and the first with three years or more of experience at the position since Greg McMackin in 2000.

Kaufman inherited a Red Raider defense ranked 114 out of 120 in total defense, and last in the country in rushing defense. In the opening game of the 2012 season against the Northwestern State Demons, Kaufman's defense set a school record of only 84 yards allowed. After the third game versus the New Mexico Lobos, the Red Raiders were 2nd in total defense in the country. Following a bye the week of September 22, the Red Raiders rose to number 1 in total defense. The Red Raiders maintained their number 1 ranking after a Week 5 defeat of their first Big 12 conference opponent, the Iowa State Cyclones. Kaufman's defense held the Cyclones to 189 yards of total offense. Following this performance, Kaufman was named by the Fort Worth Star-Telegram as the frontrunner for the Broyles Award.

After a loss at home to the 14th ranked Oklahoma Sooners and an upset victory over 5th ranked West Virginia Mountaineers, Kaufman's defense ranked 4th in total yards allowed. In the upset victory over West Virginia, the Red Raiders held Heisman Trophy-frontrunner Geno Smith to 275 yards, a passing efficiency rating of 100.71, and one touchdown pass. The win marked the most lopsided victory over a top-5 opponent in school history, and marked the debut of the Red Raiders in the BCS rankings at number 17. Kaufman was again praised for the performance of the defense, with Bruce Feldman of CBS Sports also naming him as the frontrunner for the Broyles Award.

== Cincinnati ==
Following head coach Tommy Tuberville's departure to Cincinnati, Kaufman remained a member of the Texas Tech staff through the 2012 Meineke Car Care Bowl of Texas. Following the game, it was announced on January 4, 2013, that Kaufman would be following Tuberville to Cincinnati to accept the defensive coordinator position.

== Personal life ==
Kaufman was born in Dermott, Arkansas, and has three daughters.
