= 2012 Texas Tech Red Raiders football team =

American college football season

2012 Texas Tech Red Raiders football

Meineke Car Care Bowl of Texas champion

Meineke Car Care Bowl of Texas, W 34–31 vs. Minnesota
- Conference: Big 12 Conference
- Record: 8–5 (4–5 Big 12)
- Head coach: Tommy Tuberville (3rd season; regular season); Chris Thomsen (interim, bowl game)
- Offensive coordinator: Neal Brown (3rd season)
- Offensive scheme: Air Raid
- Defensive coordinator: Art Kaufman (1st season)
- Base defense: 4–3
- Home stadium: Jones AT&T Stadium

2012 Big 12 Conference football standings
	Conf.			Overall
Team	W		L	W		L
No. 12 Kansas State $+	8	–	1	11	–	2
No. 15 Oklahoma +	8	–	1	10	–	3
No. 19 Texas	5	–	4	9	–	4
Oklahoma State	5	–	4	8	–	5
Baylor	4	–	5	8	–	5
TCU	4	–	5	7	–	6
Texas Tech	4	–	5	8	–	5
West Virginia	4	–	5	7	–	6
Iowa State	3	–	6	6	–	7
Kansas	0	–	9	1	–	11
$ – BCS representative as conference champion; + – Conference co-champions; Rankings from AP Poll

The 2012 Texas Tech Red Raiders football team represented Texas Tech University as member of the Big 12 Conference during the 2012 NCAA Division I FBS football season. Led by Tommy Tuberville in his third and final season as head coach the Red Raiders compiled an overall record of 8–5 with a mark 4–5 conference play, placing in a four-way tie for fifth place in Big 12. Texas Tech was invited to the Meineke Car Care Bowl of Texas, where they defeated Minnesota. The team played home games at Jones AT&T Stadium on the university's campus in Lubbock, Texas.

At the end of the regular season, Tuberville resigned to take the same position at Cincinnati. Offensive line coach Chris Thomsen served as interim head coach for the team's bowl game. Former Red Raider quarterback and Texas A&M offensive coordinator Kliff Kingsbury was hired as the new head coach for the 2013 season.

== Preseason ==
=== Award watch lists ===
- Seth Doege: Maxwell Award, Davey O'Brien Award, Johnny Unitas Golden Arm Award, Walter Camp Award, Manning Award
- LaAdrian Waddle: Outland Trophy
- Eric Ward: Biletnikoff Award

=== Coaching changes ===
- Defensive Coordinator: Art Kaufman replaces Chad Glasgow
- Defensive Line: Fred Tate replaces Sam McElroy
- Offensive Line: Chris Thomsen replaces Matt Moore
- Secondary: John Lovett replaces Otis Mounds

== Schedule ==
Date	Time	Opponent	Rank	Site	TV	Result	Attendance	Source
September 1	6:00 pm	Northwestern State*		Jones AT&T Stadium; Lubbock, TX	FSSW+	W 44–6	50,236	
September 8	6:00 pm	at Texas State*		Bobcat Stadium; San Marcos, TX	ESPN3	W 58–10	33,006	
September 15	6:00 pm	New Mexico*		Jones AT&T Stadium; Lubbock, TX	FCS Pacific	W 49–14	58,955	
September 29	6:00 pm	at Iowa State		Jack Trice Stadium; Ames, IA	FCS Central	W 24–13	54,149	
October 6	2:30 pm	No. 17 Oklahoma		Jones AT&T Stadium; Lubbock, TX	ABC	L 20–41	60,800	
October 13	2:30 pm	No. 5 West Virginia^{†}		Jones AT&T Stadium; Lubbock, TX	ABC	W 49–14	57,328	
October 20	2:30 pm	at TCU	No. 18	Amon G. Carter Stadium; Fort Worth, TX (rivalry)	ABC	W 56–53 ^{3OT}	47,894	
October 27	2:30 pm	at No. 4 Kansas State	No. 15	Bill Snyder Family Football Stadium; Manhattan, KS	FOX	L 24–55	50,766	
November 3	2:30 pm	Texas	No. 20	Jones AT&T Stadium; Lubbock, TX (rivalry)	ABC	L 22–31	60,879	^{^A}
November 10	11:00 am	Kansas	No. 25	Jones AT&T Stadium; Lubbock, TX	FSN	W 41–34 ^{2OT}	55,052	
November 17	2:30 pm	at Oklahoma State	No. 23т	Boone Pickens Stadium; Stillwater, OK	FSN	L 21–59	55,341	
November 24	1:30 pm	vs. Baylor		Cowboys Stadium; Arlington, TX (rivalry)	FOX	L 45–52 ^{OT}	44,168	
December 28	8:00 pm	vs. Minnesota*		Reliant Stadium; Houston, TX (Meineke Car Care Bowl of Texas)	ESPN	W 34–31	50,386	
*Non-conference game; ^{†}Homecoming; Rankings from AP Poll released prior to the game; All times are in Central time

Denotes the largest crowd to watch a football game at Jones AT&T Stadium, beating a previous record set earlier in the season in Oklahoma game.

== Rankings ==
Ranking movements Legend: ██ Increase in ranking ██ Decrease in ranking — = Not ranked RV = Received votes т = Tied with team above or below
	Week															
Poll	Pre	1	2	3	4	5	6	7	8	9	10	11	12	13	14	Final
AP	—	—	—	RV	RV	RV	RV	18	15	20	25	23 т	—	—	—	—
Coaches	RV	RV	RV	RV	RV	24	RV	20	17	20	RV	25	RV	—	—	—
Harris	Not released						RV	21	17	19	25	22	—	—	—	Not released
BCS	Not released							17	14	18	22	23	—	—	—	Not released

== Game summaries ==
=== Northwestern State ===
Northwestern State Demons at Texas Tech Red Raiders

Team	1	2	3	4	Total
Demons	0	3	0	3	6
• Red Raiders	7	17	3	17	44

- Date: September 1
- Location: Jones AT&T Stadium
  Lubbock, Texas
- Game start: 6:07 p.m. CST
- Elapsed time: 3:21
- Game attendance: 50,236
- Game weather: 94 °F (34 °C), Partly Cloudy, winds S at 14 mph
- Referee: Alan Eck
- TV announcers (FSSW+/FCS Pacific): Bill Land, Dave Lapham, and Emily Jones

Statistics	NWST	TTU
First downs	6	37
Total yards	84	500
Rushing yards	13	179
Passing yards	71	321
Turnovers	0	2
Time of possession	23:56	36:04

Team	Category	Player	Statistics
Northwestern State	Passing	Brad Henderson	10/19, 70 yards
Northwestern State	Rushing	Brad Henderson	11 rushes, 6 yards
Northwestern State	Receiving	Phillip Harvey	4 receptions, 35 yards
Texas Tech	Passing	Seth Doege	23/34, 199 yards, TD, INT
Texas Tech	Rushing	Kenny Williams	15 rushes, 74 yards
Texas Tech	Receiving	Bradley Marquez	7 receptions, 92 yards

The Red Raiders set a school record for total yards allowed in a game, with only 84 being given up to the Demons. Eric Stephens scored a pair of first-half touchdowns and Kenny Williams scored on pass from Seth Doege as the Raiders opened a 24–3 halftime lead. Doege left the game before the end of the third quarter, and his replacement, Michael Brewer, threw a pair of fourth-quarter touchdowns to Marcus Kennard as Texas Tech completed the season-opening rout.

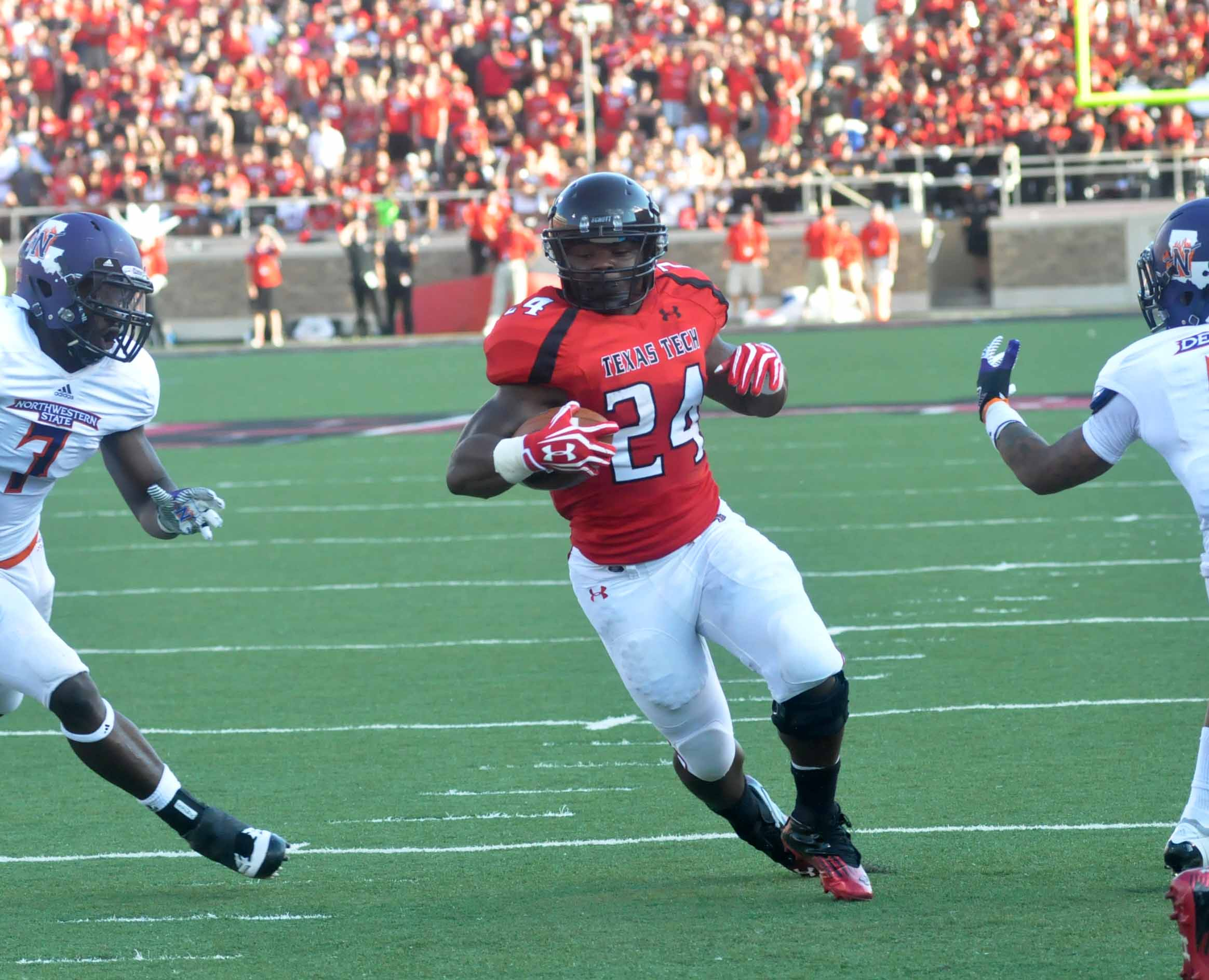
Texas Tech running back Eric Stephens, coming back from a season-ending knee injury in the 2011 season, scores a touchdown for Texas Tech against Northwestern State.

=== At Texas State ===
Texas Tech Red Raiders at Texas State Bobcats

Team	1	2	3	4	Total
• Red Raiders	21	17	17	3	58
Bobcats	0	10	0	0	10

- Date: September 8
- Location: Bobcat Stadium
  San Marcos, Texas
- Game start: 6:04 p.m. CST
- Elapsed time: 3:11
- Game attendance: 33,006
- Game weather: 89 °F (32 °C), Sunny and clear, winds NNE at 19 mph
- Referee: Scott Novak
- TV announcers (ESPN3): Trey Bender and Jay Taylor

Statistics	TTU	TXST
First downs	32	16
Total yards	591	270
Rushing yards	186	129
Passing yards	405	141
Turnovers	1	2
Time of possession	27:57	32:03

Team	Category	Player	Statistics
Texas Tech	Passing	Seth Doege	25/32, 319 yards, 5 TD
Texas Tech	Rushing	Kenny Williams	5 rushes, 62 yards, TD
Texas Tech	Receiving	Javon Bell	5 receptions, 81 yards, TD
Texas State	Passing	Tyler Arndt	12/22, 130 yards, TD, INT
Texas State	Rushing	Shaun Rutherford	9 rushes, 35 yards
Texas State	Receiving	Terrence Franks	2 receptions, 38 yards, TD

Texas State came into the game after a dominating 30–13 upset over Houston, and with a capacity crowd in a newly renovated stadium in their first year in the NCAA FBS division. But Texas Tech jumped out to a quick 14–0 lead less than 5 minutes into the game, and opened a 28–0 lead halfway through the second quarter. Seth Doege threw for 319 yards and 5 touchdown passes before being pulled from action in the third quarter, and Texas Tech's defense held Texas State to just 270 total yards of offense. Cody Davis had an 88-yard interception return for a touchdown to lead Texas Tech's defense.

=== New Mexico ===
New Mexico Lobos at Texas Tech Red Raiders

Team	1	2	3	4	Total
Lobos	0	14	0	0	14
• Red Raiders	14	28	7	0	49

- Date: September 15
- Location: Jones AT&T Stadium
  Lubbock, Texas
- Game start: 6:05 p.m. CST
- Elapsed time: 3:23
- Game attendance: 58,955
- Game weather: 65 °F (18 °C), Cloudy, Winds Calm
- Referee: Eddy Shelton
- TV announcers (FCS Pacific): Mike Gleason, Ben Leber, and Lesley McCaslin

Statistics	UNM	TTU
First downs	8	38
Total yards	127	702
Rushing yards	84	325
Passing yards	43	377
Turnovers	0	1
Time of possession	25:43	34:17

Team	Category	Player	Statistics
New Mexico	Passing	B. R. Holbrook	6/11, 43 yards
New Mexico	Rushing	Cole Gautsche	8 rushes, 36 yards
New Mexico	Receiving	Carlos Wiggins	3 receptions, 33 yards
Texas Tech	Passing	Seth Doege	27/35, 340 yards, 6 TD
Texas Tech	Rushing	Eric Stephens	12 rushes, 118 yards, TD
Texas Tech	Receiving	Eric Ward	5 receptions, 90 yards, 3 TD

The Texas Tech Red Raiders faced the New Mexico Lobos, under new head coach Bob Davie, on Texas Tech's Family Day at Jones AT&T Stadium. Seth Doege threw for 340 yards and 6 touchdowns in a dominating performance for the Texas Tech offense in the first three quarters. Doege tossed three touchdown passes to Eric Ward in the first half, and added touchdown passes to Jace Amaro and Darrin Moore before halftime. New Mexico got a second-quarter touchdown run and a long kickoff return for a touchdown to pull within 28–14 with 2:06 remaining in the second quarter, but Texas Tech pulled ahead to a 42–14 lead with two touchdowns in the final minute before halftime. Doege threw another touchdown pass to tight end Jace Amaro on Texas Tech's first possession in the second half before going to the sidelines with 11 minutes left in the third quarter. Tech's defense held UNM to only 170 total yards and just 43 yards passing.

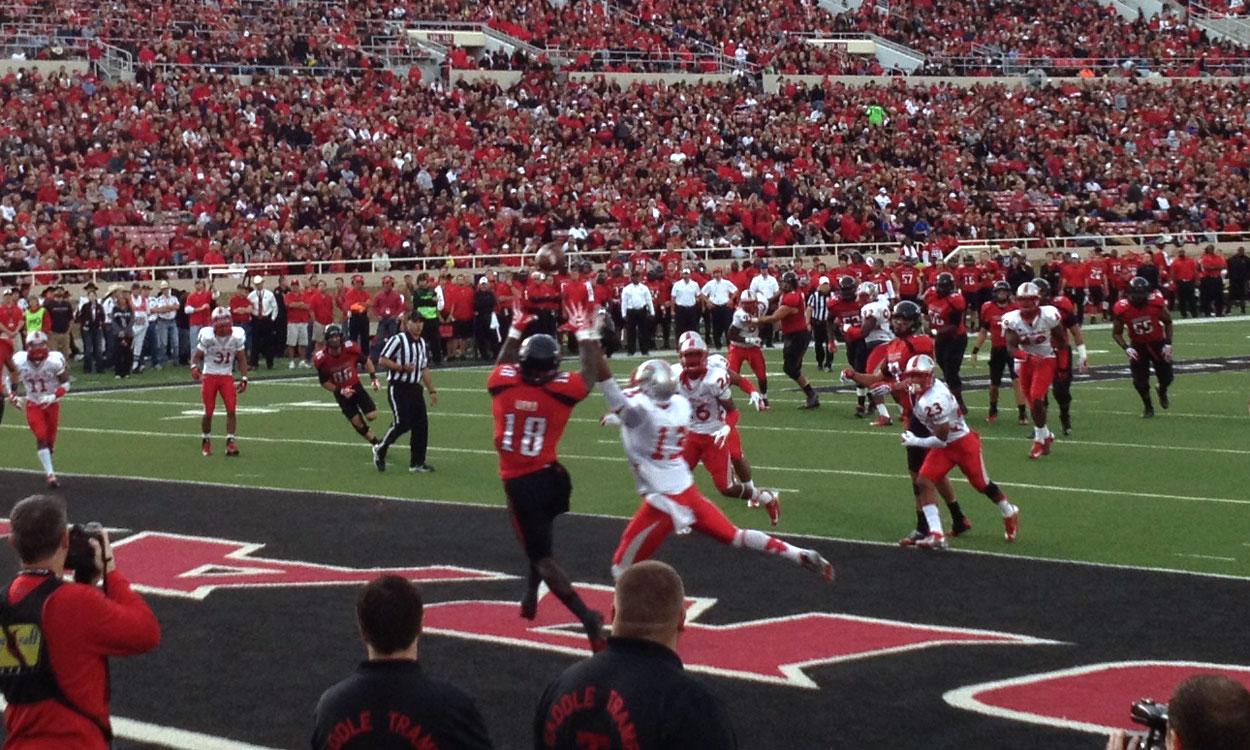
Texas Tech's Eric Ward catches a touchdown pass in the 2nd quarter of the 2012 New Mexico vs. Texas Tech football game at Jones AT&T Stadium in Lubbock, TX.

=== At Iowa State ===
Texas Tech Red Raiders at Iowa State Cyclones

Team	1	2	3	4	Total
• Red Raiders	0	7	7	10	24
Cyclones	7	0	6	0	13

- Date: September 29
- Location: Jack Trice Stadium
  Ames, Iowa
- Game start: 6:06 p.m. CST
- Elapsed time: 3:16
- Game attendance: 54,149
- Game weather: 79 °F (26 °C), Clear Skies, winds NW at 0–5 mph
- Referee: Mike Defee
- TV announcers (FCS Central): Mike Gleason, Dave Lapham and Lesley McCaslin

Statistics	TTU	ISU
First downs	20	13
Total yards	395	189
Rushing yards	63	116
Passing yards	332	73
Turnovers	2	4
Time of possession	34:37	25:23

Team	Category	Player	Statistics
Texas Tech	Passing	Seth Doege	30/46, 331 yards, 3 TD, 2 INT
Texas Tech	Rushing	Kenny Williams	15 rushes, 80 yards
Texas Tech	Receiving	Eric Ward	9 receptions, 122 yards, TD
Iowa State	Passing	Steele Jantz	10/20, 73 yards, TD, 3 INT
Iowa State	Rushing	James White	9 rushes, 57 yards
Iowa State	Receiving	James White	4 receptions, 30 yards

Coming into the game, Texas Tech was ranked first in total defense, and second in total offense. The Red Raiders held the Cyclones to 189 yards of total offense. Senior cornerback Cornelius Douglas earned recognition as Big 12 Defensive Player of the Week after recording two interceptions. Douglas is the first Red Raider defensive player to earn the honor since Daniel Charbonnet in 2008. Douglas was also named as the Jim Thorpe Defensive Back Of The Week.

=== No. 17 Oklahoma ===
No. 17 Oklahoma Sooners at Texas Tech Red Raiders

Team	1	2	3	4	Total
• No. 17 Sooners	7	17	17	0	41
Red Raiders	7	6	0	7	20

- Date: October 6
- Location: Jones AT&T Stadium
  Lubbock, Texas
- Game attendance: 60,800
- TV announcers (ABC/Dial Global): Sean McDonough, Chris Spielman, and Quint Kessenich (ABC)/ Brad Sham and Rod Woodson (Dial Global)

Statistics	OKLA	TTU
First downs	22	21
Total yards	380	360
Rushing yards	121	89
Passing yards	259	271
Turnovers	1	3
Time of possession	29:38	30:22

Team	Category	Player	Statistics
Oklahoma	Passing	Landry Jones	25/40, 259 yards, 2 TD
Oklahoma	Rushing	Damien Williams	14 rushes, 48 yards
Oklahoma	Receiving	Damien Williams	6 receptions, 82 yards
Texas Tech	Passing	Seth Doege	22/36, 203 yards, 3 INT
Texas Tech	Rushing	Sadale Foster	11 rushes, 44 yards, TD
Texas Tech	Receiving	Darrin Moore	5 receptions, 80 yards

Texas Tech came into the game with the nation's No. 1-ranked defense, but it was Oklahoma's defense that shut down Texas Tech's offense in the Raiders' first loss of the season. The game was played in cold, windy weather before a Jones AT&T Stadium record crowd of 60,800. Texas Tech held a 10–7 lead early in the second quarter on a 35-yard field goal by Ryan Bustin and a 7-yard touchdown run by Kenny Williams, but Oklahoma answered with a Blake Bell touchdown run to take a 14–10 lead. The Sooners took a 24–13 halftime lead and outscored Texas Tech 17–0 in the third quarter, and the OU defense intercepted Seth Doege three times.

=== No. 5 West Virginia ===
	1	2	3	4	Total
No. 5 Mountaineers	7	0	0	7	14
Red Raiders	14	21	7	7	49

Statistics	WVU	TTU
First downs	25	30
Total yards	408	676
Rushing yards	130	168
Passing yards	278	508
Turnovers	0	2
Time of possession	30:18	29:42

Team	Category	Player	Statistics
West Virginia	Passing	Geno Smith	29/55, 275 yards, TD
West Virginia	Rushing	Andrew Buie	21 rushes, 71 yards
West Virginia	Receiving	Tavon Austin	9 receptions, 99 yards
Texas Tech	Passing	Seth Doege	32/42, 499 yards, 6 TD, INT
Texas Tech	Rushing	Sadale Foster	10 rushes, 82 yards, TD
Texas Tech	Receiving	Jace Amaro	5 receptions, 156 yards, TD

Starting quarterback Seth Doege threw for a career-high 504 yards, and tied his career high with 6 touchdown passes. The team was also named the Tostitos Fiesta Bowl National Team of the Week. Tech's defense gave up 275 yards to Heisman Trophy front-runner Geno Smith, but only one touchdown pass. Three of Doege's touchdown passes went to Darrin Moore, and Jace Amaro had 5 catches for 156 yards and one touchdown. Sadale Foster's 53-yard touchdown run shortly before halftime gave the Raiders a 35–7 halftime lead as Texas Tech won its Homecoming game. Doege earned Big 12 Offensive Player of the Week honors, as well as being named the Davey O'Brien Quarterback of the Week. Safety Cody Davis was named the Big 12 Defensive Player of the Week. CBS Sports named Tuberville the Big XII "Coach of the Week" after the victory.

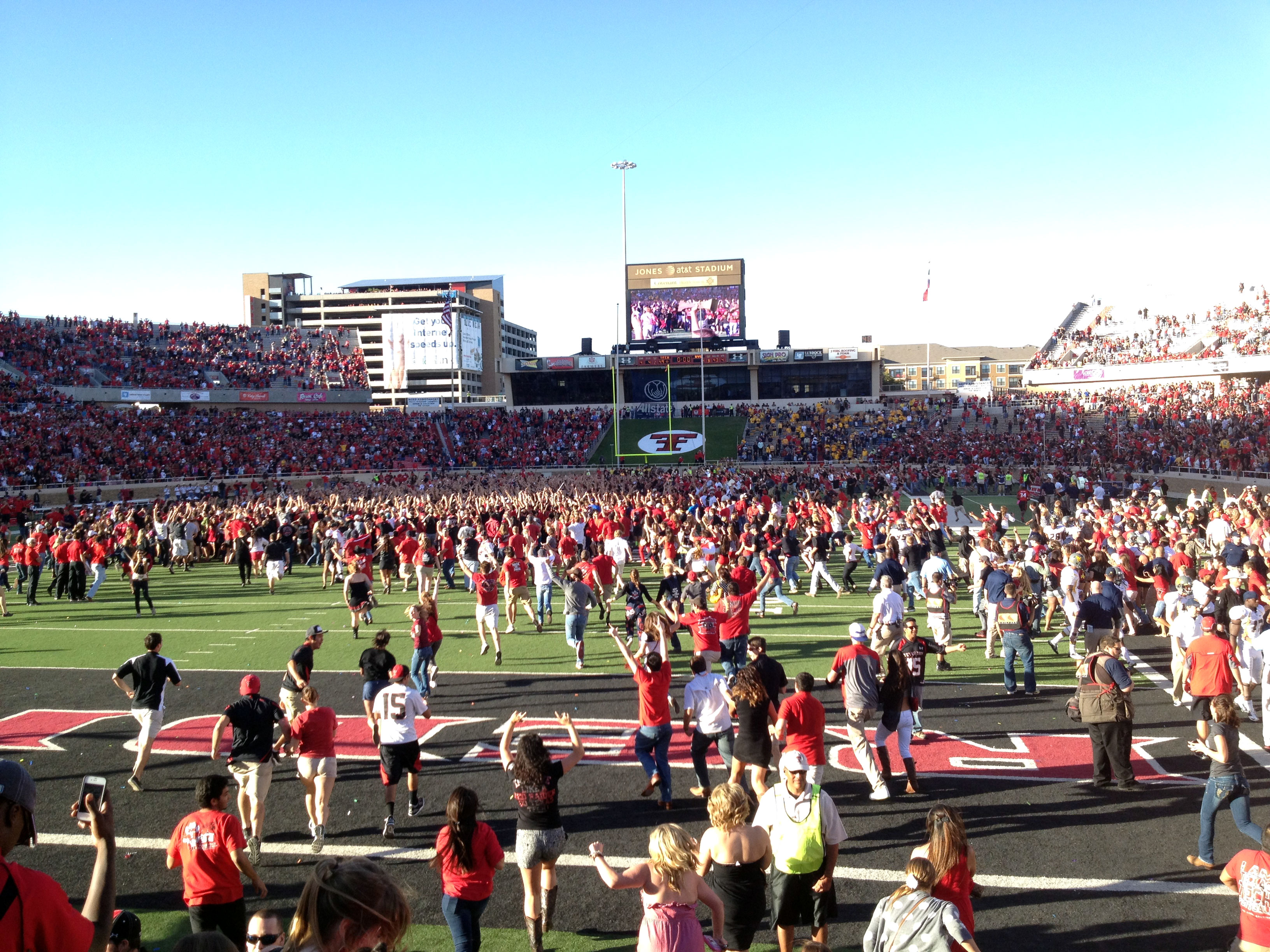
Texas Tech fans rush the field after the Red Raiders blow out the West Virginia Mountaineers at Jones AT&T Stadium in Lubbock, TX.

=== At TCU ===
	1	2	3	4	OT	2OT	3OT	Total
No. 18 Red Raiders	7	14	0	15	7	7	6	56
Horned Frogs	10	10	3	13	7	7	3	53

Statistics	TTU	TCU
First downs	21	28
Total yards	389	516
Rushing yards	71	184
Passing yards	318	332
Turnovers	0	3
Time of possession	27:43	32:17

Team	Category	Player	Statistics
Texas Tech	Passing	Seth Doege	30/42, 318 yards, 7 TD
Texas Tech	Rushing	Kenny Williams	6 rushes, 47 yards, TD
Texas Tech	Receiving	Darrin Moore	5 receptions, 63 yards, TD
TCU	Passing	Trevone Boykin	26/44, 332 yards, 4 TD, 2 INT
TCU	Rushing	B. J. Catalon	12 rushes, 72 yards
TCU	Receiving	Skye Dawson	10 receptions, 154 yards, TD

Quarterback Seth Doege threw for a new career high 7 touchdowns in the triple overtime victory and was named as a semi-finalist for the Davey O'Brien Award, won the Capital One Cup Impact Performance of the Week, and was named the AT&T All America Player of the Week. The game was the first in the history of either school to have three overtime periods, and the combined score was the highest in Texas Tech history since 1950.

=== At No. 4 Kansas State ===
	1	2	3	4	Total
No. 15 Red Raiders	7	3	7	7	24
No. 4 Wildcats	3	10	21	21	55

Statistics	TTU	KSU
First downs		
Total yards		
Rushing yards		
Passing yards		
Turnovers		
Time of possession		

Team	Category	Player	Statistics
Texas Tech	Passing		
Texas Tech	Rushing		
Texas Tech	Receiving		
Kansas State	Passing		
Kansas State	Rushing		
Kansas State	Receiving		

=== Texas ===
	1	2	3	4	Total
Longhorns	14	10	0	7	31
No. 20 Red Raiders	7	6	9	0	22

Statistics	TEX	TTU
First downs		
Total yards		
Rushing yards		
Passing yards		
Turnovers		
Time of possession		

Team	Category	Player	Statistics
Texas	Passing		
Texas	Rushing		
Texas	Receiving		
Texas Tech	Passing		
Texas Tech	Rushing		
Texas Tech	Receiving		

=== Kansas ===
	1	2	3	4	OT	2OT	Total
Jayhawks	7	10	0	10	7	0	34
No. 25 Red Raiders	7	14	3	3	7	7	41

Statistics	KU	TTU
First downs		
Total yards		
Rushing yards		
Passing yards		
Turnovers		
Time of possession		

Team	Category	Player	Statistics
Kansas	Passing		
Kansas	Rushing		
Kansas	Receiving		
Texas Tech	Passing		
Texas Tech	Rushing		
Texas Tech	Receiving		

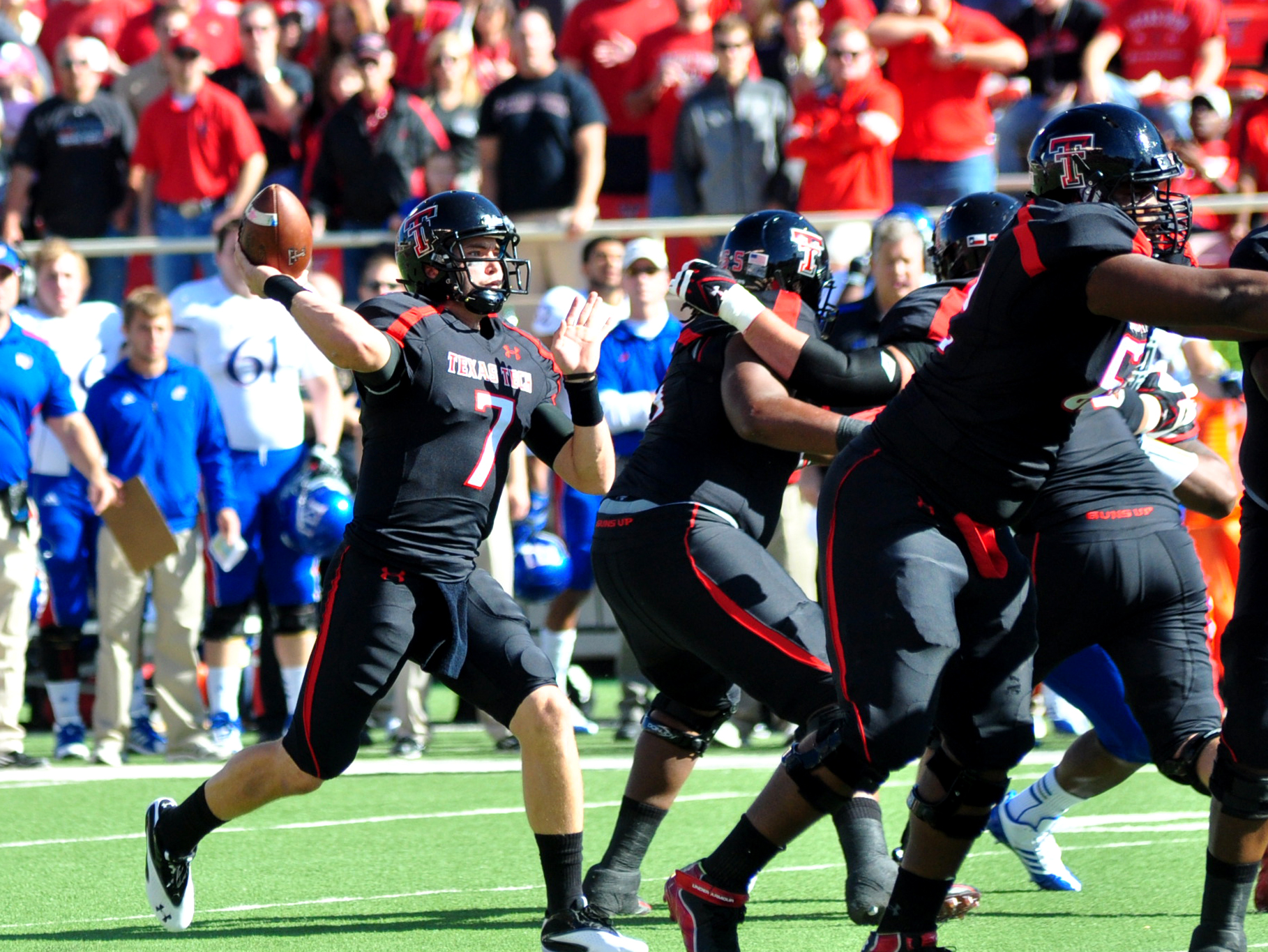
Quarterback Seth Doege completes a first-quarter pass during Texas Tech's victory over Kansas.

Texas Tech came into the Kansas game after consecutive losses to ranked teams (Texas and Kansas State). In the final home game for the 2012 seniors, Seth Doege threw for 476 yards and three touchdowns as the Red Raiders survived the upset bid from the Jayhawks. Doege threw his three touchdown passes to Jakeem Grant, Tyson Williams and Darrin Moore in the first half as Texas Tech built a 21–7 lead midway through the second quarter. Texas Tech had the ball and was in position to drive for another score, but a Doege interception gave the Jayhawks new life and they closed to within 21–17 at the half. Texas Tech's offense stalled in the red zone in the second half as they managed only a pair of field goals. Kansas tied the score on a field goal with 41 seconds remaining, but Doege and the Raiders responded, driving into field goal position in the closing seconds of the game. However, a 41-yard Ryan Bustin field goal attempt barely missed to the left as time ran out. In the first overtime, the Jayhawks scored on a screen pass from Michael Cummings to star running back James Sims, and the Raiders tied things up with senior Eric Stephens' touchdown run and Bustin's extra point. In the second overtime, the Raiders scored on a "wildcat" formation trick play, with Stephens throwing to Darrin Moore for the go-ahead touchdown. Texas Tech's defense made a stand on Kansas' ensuing possession, shutting down three running attempts to set up a fourth down from the 24-yard line. Cummings' pass to the end zone was knocked down, and Texas Tech improved its record to 7–3 for the season.

=== At Oklahoma State ===
	1	2	3	4	Total
No. 23 Red Raiders	0	14	0	7	21
Cowboys	7	28	17	7	59

Statistics	TTU	OKST
First downs		
Total yards		
Rushing yards		
Passing yards		
Turnovers		
Time of possession		

Team	Category	Player	Statistics
Texas Tech	Passing		
Texas Tech	Rushing		
Texas Tech	Receiving		
Oklahoma State	Passing		
Oklahoma State	Rushing		
Oklahoma State	Receiving		

=== Vs. Baylor ===
	1	2	3	4	OT	Total
Bears	7	7	14	17	7	52
Red Raiders	14	7	10	14	0	45

Statistics	BAY	TTU
First downs		
Total yards		
Rushing yards		
Passing yards		
Turnovers		
Time of possession		

Team	Category	Player	Statistics
Baylor	Passing		
Baylor	Rushing		
Baylor	Receiving		
Texas Tech	Passing		
Texas Tech	Rushing		
Texas Tech	Receiving		

=== Vs. Minnesota (Meineke Car Care Bowl of Texas) ===
	1	2	3	4	Total
Golden Gophers	10	7	7	7	31
Red Raiders	14	10	0	10	34

Statistics	MINN	TTU
First downs		
Total yards		
Rushing yards		
Passing yards		
Turnovers		
Time of possession		

Team	Category	Player	Statistics
Minnesota	Passing		
Minnesota	Rushing		
Minnesota	Receiving		
Texas Tech	Passing		
Texas Tech	Rushing		
Texas Tech	Receiving		

After the regular season, but prior to the 2012 Meineke Car Care Bowl of Texas, Tommy Tuberville left the program to take the head coaching job with the Cincinnati Bearcats. Kliff Kingsbury was hired as the new head coach. Nevertheless, Chris Thomsen, interim head coach, oversaw the bowl game.
