= 2012 Big 12 Conference football season =

American college football season

- League: NCAA Division I FBS (Football Bowl Subdivision)
- Sport: football
- Duration: August 2012 through January 2013
- Teams: 10

2013 NFL Draft
- Top draft pick: Lane Johnson (Oklahoma)
- Picked by: Philadelphia Eagles, 4th overall

Regular season
- Co-Champions: Kansas State; Oklahoma

Football seasons
- 2011 2013

2012 Big 12 Conference football standings
	Conf.			Overall
Team	W		L	W		L
No. 12 Kansas State $+	8	–	1	11	–	2
No. 15 Oklahoma +	8	–	1	10	–	3
No. 19 Texas	5	–	4	9	–	4
Oklahoma State	5	–	4	8	–	5
Baylor	4	–	5	8	–	5
TCU	4	–	5	7	–	6
Texas Tech	4	–	5	8	–	5
West Virginia	4	–	5	7	–	6
Iowa State	3	–	6	6	–	7
Kansas	0	–	9	1	–	11
$ – BCS representative as conference champion; + – Conference co-champions; Rankings from AP Poll

The 2012 Big 12 Conference football season was the 17th season for the Big 12, as part of the 2012 NCAA Division I FBS football season. It was also the first season in the Big 12 for TCU and West Virginia, replacing Texas A&M and Missouri, as they both moved to the Southeastern Conference.

== Head coaches ==
- Art Briles, Baylor
- Paul Rhoads, Iowa State
- Charlie Weis, Kansas
- Bill Snyder, Kansas State
- Bob Stoops, Oklahoma
- Mike Gundy, Oklahoma State
- Mack Brown, Texas
- Gary Patterson, Texas Christian
- Tommy Tuberville, Texas Tech
- Dana Holgorsen, West Virginia

== Rankings ==
Legend
	Increase in ranking
	Decrease in ranking
	Not ranked previous week
RV	Received votes but were not ranked in Top 25 of poll

		Pre	Wk 1	Wk 2	Wk 3	Wk 4	Wk 5	Wk 6	Wk 7	Wk 8	Wk 9	Wk 10	Wk 11	Wk 12	Wk 13	Wk 14	Final
Baylor	AP	RV	RV	RV	RV	25	RV	RV						RV		RV	RV
Baylor	C	RV	RV	RV	RV	24	RV	RV							RV		RV
Baylor	Harris	Not released						RV	RV					RV	RV	RV	
Baylor	BCS	Not released															
Iowa State	AP			RV	RV	RV	RV	RV						RV			
Iowa State	C			RV	RV	RV		25	RV		RV						
Iowa State	Harris	Not released						25	RV	RV	RV						
Iowa State	BCS	Not released							24								
Kansas	AP																
Kansas	C																
Kansas	Harris	Not released															
Kansas	BCS	Not released															
Kansas State	AP	22	21	14	15	7	7	6	4	4	3	3	2 (14)	7	7	7	12
Kansas State	C	21	20	15	13	8	8	5	3	4	3	3	2 (14)	8	7	6	11
Kansas State	Harris	Not released						5	4	4	3 (1)	3 (1)	2 (23)	7	6	6	
Kansas State	BCS	Not released							4	3	2	2	1	6	6	5	
Oklahoma	AP	4 (1)	5	5	6	16	17	13	10	8	14	14	13	14	12	12	15
Oklahoma	C	4	5	5	5	15	14	10	7	7	12	13	12	13	11	11	15
Oklahoma	Harris	Not released						13	9	7	12	13	12	13	11	11	
Oklahoma	BCS	Not released							9	8	12	12	12	13	11	11	
Oklahoma State	AP	19	18	RV	RV	RV				RV	RV	RV	RV	22	24	RV	
Oklahoma State	C	19	16	RV	25	22	RV	RV	RV	RV	24	RV	24	21	RV	RV	
Oklahoma State	Harris	Not released						RV	RV	RV	25	RV	RV	22	25	RV	
Oklahoma State	BCS	Not released									24		24	21	23		
TCU	AP	20	20	16	17	15	15	RV	RV	RV		RV	RV	RV	RV	RV	
TCU	C	17	17	15	16	14	13	23	21	RV		RV			RV		
TCU	Harris	Not released						21	22	25	RV	RV	RV	RV	RV	RV	
TCU	BCS	Not released							23								
Texas	AP	15	17	14	12	12	11	15	RV	RV	RV	19	18	18	23	RV	19
Texas	C	15	15	12	10	10	9	15	RV	24	22	17	15	15	21	25	18
Texas	Harris	Not released						15	25	24	22	17	15	17	20	24	
Texas	BCS	Not released							25	23	23	17	15	16	18	23	
Texas Tech	AP				RV	RV	RV	RV	18	15	20	25	23				
Texas Tech	C	RV	RV	RV	RV	RV	24	RV	20	17	20	RV	25	RV			
Texas Tech	Harris	Not released						RV	21	17	19	25	22	RV			
Texas Tech	BCS	Not released							17	14	18	22	23				
West Virginia	AP	11	9	9	8	9	8	5	17	25	23					RV	
West Virginia	C	11	8	8	7	7	7	4	15	22	19	RV					
West Virginia	Harris	Not released						4	15	22	20	RV				RV	
West Virginia	BCS	Not released							13	19	21						

== Schedule ==
Index to colors and formatting
Big 12 member won
Big 12 member lost
Big 12 teams in **bold**

=== Week one ===
Date	Time	Visiting team	Home team	Site	TV	Result	Attendance	Ref.
September 1	11:00 a.m.	Marshall	No. 11 **West Virginia**	Mountaineer Field • Morgantown, West Virginia	FX	**W** 69–34	59,120	
September 1	2:30 p.m.	Tulsa	**Iowa State**	Jack Trice Stadium • Ames, IA	FSN	**W** 38–23	54,931	
September 1	6:00 p.m.	South Dakota State	**Kansas**	Memorial Stadium • Lawrence, Kansas	Jayhawk TV	**W** 31–17	46,601	
September 1	6:00 p.m.	Missouri State	No. 22 **Kansas State**	Bill Snyder Family Football Stadium • Manhattan, Kansas	K-StateHD.TV	**W** 51–9	50,007	
September 1	6:00 p.m.	Savannah State	No. 19 **Oklahoma State**	Boone Pickens Stadium • Stillwater, Oklahoma	FCS	**W** 84–0	55,784	
September 1	6:00 p.m.	Northwestern State	**Texas Tech**	Jones AT&T Stadium • Lubbock, Texas	FS Southwest +	**W** 44–6	50,237	
September 1	7:00 p.m.	Wyoming	No. 15 **Texas**	Darrell K Royal–Texas Memorial Stadium • Austin, Texas	LHN	**W** 37–17	101,142	
September 1	9:30 p.m.	No. 4 **Oklahoma**	UTEP	Sun Bowl Stadium • El Paso, Texas	FSN	**W** 24–7	40,137	
September 2	5:30 p.m.	SMU	**Baylor**	Floyd Casey Stadium • Waco, Texas	FSN	**W** 59–24	43,514	
^{#}Rankings from AP Poll released prior to game. All times are in Central Time.

=== Week two ===
Date	Time	Visiting team	Home team	Site	TV	Result	Attendance	Ref.
September 8	11:00 a.m.	Miami	No. 21 **Kansas State**	Bill Snyder Family Football Stadium • Manhattan, Kansas	FX	**W** 52–13	48,843	
September 8	2:30 p.m.	Rice	**Kansas**	Memorial Stadium • Lawrence, Kansas	FSN	**L** 24–25	44,683	
September 8	2:30 p.m.	**Iowa State**	Iowa	Kinnick Stadium • Iowa City, IA	BTN	**W** 9–6	70,585	
September 8	6:00 p.m.	Florida A&M	No. 5 **Oklahoma**	Oklahoma Memorial Stadium • Norman, Oklahoma		**W** 69–13	84,852	
September 8	6:00 p.m.	Grambling State	No. 20 **TCU**	Amon G. Carter Stadium • Fort Worth, Texas	FSN	**W** 56–0	45,112	
September 8	6:00 p.m.	**Texas Tech**	Texas State	Bobcat Stadium • San Marcos, Texas	ESPN3	**W** 58–10	33,006	
September 8	7:00 p.m.	New Mexico	No. 17 **Texas**	Darrell K. Royal–Texas Memorial Stadium • Austin, Texas	LHN	**W** 45–0	100,990	
September 8	9:30 p.m.	No. 18 **Oklahoma State**	Arizona	Arizona Stadium • Tucson, Arizona	Pac-12 Network	**L** 38–59	45,602	
^{#}Rankings from AP Poll released prior to game. All times are in Central Time.

.

=== Week three ===
Date	Time	Visiting team	Home team	Site	TV	Result	Attendance	Ref.
September 15	11:00 a.m.	No. 16 **TCU**	**Kansas**	Memorial Stadium • Lawrence, Kansas	FX	**TCU** 20–6	43,867	
September 15	11:00 a.m.	Louisiana-Lafayette	**Oklahoma State**	Boone Pickens Stadium • Stillwater, Oklahoma	FSN	**W** 65–24	56,062	
September 15	3:30 p.m.	James Madison	No. 9 **West Virginia**	FedExField • Landover, Maryland	Root Sports / Mountaineer Sports Network	**W** 42–12	45,511	
September 15	6:00 p.m.	North Texas	No. 15 **Kansas State**	Bill Snyder Family Football Stadium • Manhattan, Kansas	FSN	**W** 35–21	50,290	
September 15	6:00 p.m.	New Mexico	**Texas Tech**	Jones AT&T Stadium • Lubbock, Texas	FCS	**W** 49–14	58,955	
September 15	6:05 p.m.	Sam Houston State	**Baylor**	Floyd Casey Stadium • Waco, Texas	FCS	**W** 48–23	44,856	
September 15	7:00 p.m.	Western Illinois	**Iowa State**	Jack Trice Stadium • Ames, IA	Cyclones.TV	**W** 37–3	55,783	
September 15	8:26 p.m.	No. 14 **Texas**	Ole Miss	Vaught–Hemingway Stadium • Oxford, Mississippi	ESPN	**W** 66–31	61,797	
^{#}Rankings from AP Poll released prior to game. All times are in Central Time.

=== Week four ===
Date	Time	Visiting team	Home team	Site	TV	Result	Attendance	Ref.
September 21	7:00 p.m.	**Baylor**	Louisiana-Monroe	Malone Stadium • Monroe, Louisiana	ESPN	**W** 47–42	31,175	
September 22	11:00 a.m.	Virginia	No. 17 **TCU**	Amon G. Carter Stadium • Fort Worth, Texas	ESPN	**W** 27–7	46,330	
September 22	11:00 a.m.	Maryland	No. 8 **West Virginia**	Mountaineer Field • Morgantown, West Virginia	FX	**W** 31–21	58,504	
September 22	2:30 p.m.	**Kansas**	Northern Illinois	Huskie Stadium • DeKalb, Illinois	ESPN3	**L** 23–30	18,374	
September 22	6:50 p.m.	No. 15 **Kansas State**	No. 6 **Oklahoma**	Oklahoma Memorial Stadium • Norman, Oklahoma	FOX	**KSU** 24–19	85,276	
^{#}Rankings from AP Poll released prior to game. All times are in Central Time.

=== Week five ===
Date	Time	Visiting team	Home team	Site	TV	Result	Attendance	Ref.
September 29	11:00 a.m.	No. 25 **Baylor**	No. 9 **West Virginia**	Mountaineer Field • Morgantown, West Virginia	FX	**WVU** 63–70	60,012	
September 29	6:00 p.m.	**Texas Tech**	**Iowa State**	Jack Trice Stadium • Ames, IA	FCS	**TTU** 24–13	54,149	
September 29	6:00 p.m.	No. 17 **TCU**	SMU	Gerald J. Ford Stadium • University Park, Texas	FSN	**W** 24–16	28,436	
September 29	6:50 p.m.	No. 12 **Texas**	**Oklahoma State**	Boone Pickens Stadium • Stillwater, Oklahoma	FOX	**UT** 41–36	56,709	
^{#}Rankings from AP Poll released prior to game. All times are in Central Time.

=== Week six ===
Date	Time	Visiting team	Home team	Site	TV	Result	Attendance	Ref.
October 6	11:00 a.m.	**Kansas**	No. 7 **Kansas State**	Bill Snyder Family Stadium • Manhattan, Kansas	FX	**KSU** 56–16	50,344	
October 6	2:30 p.m.	**Iowa State**	No. 15 **TCU**	Amon G. Carter Stadium • Fort Worth, Texas	FSN	**ISU** 37–23	42,152	
October 6	2:30 p.m.	**Oklahoma**	No. 17 **Texas Tech**	Jones AT&T Stadium • Lubbock, Texas	ABC / ESPN2	**OU** 41–20	60,800	
October 6	6:00 p.m.	No. 8 **West Virginia**	No. 11 **Texas**	Darrell K. Royal–Texas Memorial Stadium • Austin, Texas	FOX	**WVU** 48–45	101,851	
^{#}Rankings from AP Poll released prior to game. All times are in Central Time.

=== Week seven ===
Date	Time	Visiting team	Home team	Site	TV	Result	Attendance	Ref.
October 13	11:00 a.m.	No. 6 **Kansas State**	**Iowa State**	Jack Trice Stadium • Ames, IA	FX	**KSU** 27–21	56,800	
October 13	11:00 a.m.	No. 15 **Texas**	No. 13 **Oklahoma**	Cotton Bowl • Dallas	ABC	**OU** 63–21	92,500	
October 13	2:30 p.m.	**Oklahoma State**	**Kansas**	Memorial Stadium • Lawrence, Kansas	FSN	**OSU** 20–14	31,115	
October 13	2:30 p.m.	No. 5 **West Virginia**	**Texas Tech**	Jones AT&T Stadium • Lubbock, Texas	ABC / ESPN	**TTU** 14–49	57,328	
October 13	6:00 p.m.	**TCU**	**Baylor**	Floyd Casey Stadium • Waco, Texas	FSN	**TCU** 49–21	42,524	
^{#}Rankings from AP Poll released prior to game. All times are in Central Time.

=== Week eight ===
Date	Time	Visiting team	Home team	Site	TV	Result	Attendance	Ref.
October 20	11:00 a.m.	**Iowa State**	**Oklahoma State**	Boone Pickens Stadium • Stillwater, Oklahoma	FX	**OSU** 10–31	57,019	
October 20	2:30 p.m.	**#18 Texas Tech**	**TCU**	Amon G. Carter Stadium • Fort Worth, Texas	ABC	**TTU** 56–53 ^{3OT}	47,894	
October 20	6:00 p.m.	**Kansas**	**#10 Oklahoma**	Oklahoma Memorial Stadium • Norman, Oklahoma	FSN	**OU** 7–52	84,532	
October 20	6:00 p.m.	**#4 Kansas State**	**#17 West Virginia**	Mountaineer Field • Morgantown, West Virginia	FOX	**KSU** 55–14	60,101	
October 20	7:00 p.m.	**Baylor**	**Texas**	Darrell K Royal–Texas Memorial Stadium • Austin, Texas	ABC	**UT** 50–56	101,353	
^{#}Rankings from AP Poll released prior to game. All times are in Central Time.

=== Week nine ===
Date	Time	Visiting team	Home team	Site	TV	Result	Attendance	Ref.
October 27	11:00 a.m.	**Texas**	**Kansas**	Memorial Stadium • Lawrence, Kansas	FSN	**UT** 21–17	40,097	
October 27	2:30 p.m.	**#15 Texas Tech**	**#4 Kansas State**	Bill Snyder Family Football Stadium • Manhattan, Kansas	FOX	**KSU** 24–55	50,766	
October 27	2:30 p.m.	**TCU**	**Oklahoma State**	Boone Pickens Stadium • Stillwater, Oklahoma	FSN	**OSU**14–36	57,183	
October 27	6:00 p.m.	**Baylor**	**Iowa State**	Jack Trice Stadium • Ames, IA	FSN	**ISU** 21–35	54,877	
October 27	7:00 p.m.	#5 Notre Dame	**#8 Oklahoma**	Oklahoma Memorial Stadium • Norman, Oklahoma	ABC	**L** 30–13	86,031	
^{#}Rankings from AP Poll released prior to game. All times are in Central Time.

=== Week ten ===
Date	Time	Visiting team	Home team	Site	TV	Result	Attendance	Ref.
November 3	11:00 a.m.	**#14 Oklahoma**	**Iowa State**	Jack Trice Stadium • Ames, IA	ABC	**OU** 35–20	56,585	
November 3	2:00 p.m.	**TCU**	**#23 West Virginia**	Mountaineer Field • Morgantown, West Virginia	FOX	**TCU** 39–38 ^{2OT}	52,322	
November 3	2:30 p.m.	**Kansas**	**Baylor**	Floyd Casey Stadium • Waco, Texas	FSN	**BU**14–41	39,039	
November 3	2:30 p.m.	**Texas**	**#20 Texas Tech**	Jones AT&T Stadium • Lubbock, Texas	ABC / ESPN2	**UT** 31–22	60,879	
November 3	7:00 p.m.	**Oklahoma State**	**#3 Kansas State**	Bill Snyder Family Football Stadium • Manhattan, Kansas	ABC	**KSU** 30–44	50,781	
^{#}Rankings from AP Poll released prior to game. All times are in Central Time.

=== Week eleven ===
Date	Time	Visiting team	Home team	Site	TV	Result	Attendance	Ref.
November 10	11:00 a.m.	**Kansas**	**#25 Texas Tech**	Jones AT&T Stadium • Lubbock, Texas	FSN	**TTU** 34–41 ^{2OT}	55,052	
November 10	11:00 a.m.	**Iowa State**	**#19 Texas**	Darrell K Royal–Texas Memorial Stadium • Austin, Texas	LHN	**UT** 7–33	100,018	
November 10	2:30 p.m.	**Baylor**	**#14 Oklahoma**	Oklahoma Memorial Stadium • Norman, Oklahoma	FSN	**OU** 34–42	84,945	
November 10	2:30 p.m.	**West Virginia**	**Oklahoma State**	Boone Pickens Stadium • Stillwater, Oklahoma	ABC / ESPN2	**OSU** 34–55	57,799	
November 10	6:00 p.m.	**#3 Kansas State**	**TCU**	Amon G. Carter Stadium • Fort Worth, Texas	FOX	**KSU** 23–10	47,292	
^{#}Rankings from AP Poll released prior to game. All times are in Central Time.

=== Week twelve ===
Date	Time	Visiting team	Home team	Site	TV	Result	Attendance	Ref.
November 17	2:30 p.m.	**#23 Texas Tech**	**Oklahoma State**	Boone Pickens Stadium • Stillwater, Oklahoma	FSN	**OSU** 21–59	55,341	
November 17	6:00 p.m.	**Iowa State**	**Kansas**	Memorial Stadium • Lawrence, Kansas	FSN	**ISU** 51–23	41,608	
November 17	6:00 p.m.	**#13 Oklahoma**	**West Virginia**	Mountaineer Field • Morgantown, West Virginia	FOX	**OU** 50–49	50,238	
November 17	7:00 p.m.	**#2 Kansas State**	**Baylor**	Floyd Casey Stadium • Waco, Texas	ESPN	**BU** 24–52	38,029	
^{#}Rankings from AP Poll released prior to game. All times are in Central Time.

=== Week thirteen ===
Date	Time	Visiting team	Home team	Site	TV	Result	Attendance	Ref.
November 22	6:30 p.m.	**TCU**	**#18 Texas**	Darrell K. Royal–Texas Memorial Stadium • Austin, Texas	ESPN	**TCU** 20–13	99,950	
November 23	2:30 p.m.	**West Virginia**	**Iowa State**	Jack Trice Stadium • Ames, IA	ABC	**WVU** 31–24	53,792	
November 24	1:30 p.m.	**Baylor**	**Texas Tech**	Cowboys Stadium • Arlington, Texas	FOX	**BU** 52–45 ^{OT}	44,168	
November 24	2:30 p.m.	**#22 Oklahoma State**	**#14 Oklahoma**	Oklahoma Memorial Stadium • Norman, Oklahoma	ESPN	**OU** 48–51 ^{OT}	85,824	
^{#}Rankings from AP Poll released prior to game. All times are in Central Time.

=== Week fourteen ===
Date	Time	Visiting team	Home team	Site	TV	Result	Attendance	Ref.
December 1	11:00 a.m.	**#12 Oklahoma**	**TCU**	Amon G. Carter Stadium • Fort Worth, Texas	ESPN	**OU** 24–17	47,501	
December 1	11:00 a.m.	**#24 Oklahoma State**	**Baylor**	Floyd Casey Stadium • Waco, Texas	FX	**BU** 34–41	39,203	
December 1	1:30 p.m.	**Kansas**	**West Virginia**	Mountaineer Field • Morgantown, West Virginia	FSN	**WVU** 10–59	51,112	
December 1	7:00 p.m.	**#23 Texas**	**#7 Kansas State**	Bill Snyder Family Football Stadium • Manhattan, Kansas	ABC	**KSU** 24–42	50,912	
^{#}Rankings from AP Poll released prior to game. All times are in Central Time.

== Records against other conferences ==
=== Big 12 vs. BCS matchups ===
Date	Visitor	Home	Winning team	Opponent Conference	Notes
September 8	**Iowa State**	Iowa	**Iowa State**	Big Ten	
September 8	#18 **Oklahoma State**	Arizona	Arizona	Pac-12	Arizona scores the most points against OSU since the 2008 edition of the Bedlam Series against Oklahoma.
September 15	#14 **Texas**	Ole Miss	**Texas**	SEC	
September 22	Virginia	#17 **TCU**	**TCU**	ACC	
September 22	Maryland	#8 **West Virginia**	**West Virginia**	ACC	
October 27	#5 Notre Dame	#8 **Oklahoma**	Notre Dame	Independent	

=== Bowl games ===
Big 12 teams played in the following bowl games. Big 12 teams are bolded.

Every team except for the Kansas Jayhawks played in a bowl game for the 2012 season. Every one of the Jayhawk's opponents played in a bowl game (for FBS teams) except South Dakota State, a FCS team that played two rounds in the FCS Football Championship.

Bowl Game	Date	Stadium	City	Television	Time (CST)	Team	Score	Team	Score
Holiday Bowl	December 27	Qualcomm Stadium	San Diego, California	ESPN	8:45 p.m.	**Baylor**	49	#17 UCLA	26
Meineke Car Care Bowl of Texas	December 28	Reliant Stadium	Houston	ESPN	8:00 p.m.	Minnesota	31	**Texas Tech**	34
Pinstripe Bowl	December 29	Yankee Stadium	Bronx, New York	ESPN	2:15 p.m.	**West Virginia**	14	Syracuse	38
Alamo Bowl	December 29	Alamodome	San Antonio	ESPN	5:45 p.m.	**Texas**	31	#15 Oregon State	27
Buffalo Wild Wings Bowl	December 29	Sun Devil Stadium	Tempe, Arizona	ESPN	9:15 p.m.	**TCU**	16	Michigan State	17
Liberty Bowl	December 31	Liberty Bowl Stadium	Memphis, Tennessee	ESPN	2:30 p.m.	**Iowa State**	17	Tulsa	31
Heart of Dallas Bowl	January 1	Cotton Bowl Stadium	Dallas	ESPNU	11:00 a.m.	Purdue	14	**Oklahoma State**	58
Fiesta Bowl	January 3	University of Phoenix Stadium	Glendale, Arizona	ESPN	7:30 p.m.	#5 Oregon	35	#7 **Kansas State**	17
Cotton Bowl Classic	January 4	Cowboys Stadium	Arlington, Texas	FOX	7:00 p.m.	#10 Texas A&M	41	#12 **Oklahoma**	13

== Players of the week ==
Following each week of games, Big 12 conference officials select the players of the week from the conference's teams.

Week	Offensive			Defensive			Special teams		
Week	Player	Position	Team	Player	Position	Team	Player	Position	Team
1	Geno Smith	QB	WVU	Isaiah Bruce	LB	WVU	Kirby Van Der Kamp	P	ISU
2	Collin Klein	QB	K-State	Jake Knott	LB	ISU	Deante’ Gray	PR	TCU
3	David Ash	QB	UT	Joel Hasley	LB	TCU	Tyler Lockett	KR	K-State
4	Tavon Austin	WR	WVU	Kenny Cain	LB	TCU	Ryan Doerr	P	K-State
5	Geno Smith	QB	WVU	Cornelius Douglas	CB	TTU	DJ Monroe	KR	UT
6	Andrew Buie	RB	WVU	Alex Okafor	DE	UT	Tavon Austin	KR	WVU
7	Seth Doege	QB	TTU	Cody David	S	TTU	Quinn Sharp	PK/P	OSU
8	Collin Klein	QB	K-State	Arthur Brown	LB	K-State	Zack Craig	S	OSU
9	Collin Klein	QB	K-State	Jake Knott	LB	ISU	Quinn Sharp	PK/P	OSU
10	Josh Boyce	WR	TCU	Allen Chapman	DB	K-State	Tyler Lockett	KR	K-State
11	Josh Stewart	WR	OSU	Meshak Williams	DE	K-State	Justin Gilbert	KR	OSU
12	Landry Jones	QB	OU	Joe Williams	CB	BU	Zack Craig	S	OSU
13	Landry Jones	QB	OU	Eddie Lackey	LB	BU	Jalen Saunders	PR	OU
14									

=== Position key ===
Center	C	Cornerback	CB	Defensive back	DB	Defensive end	DE
Defensive lineman	DL	Defensive tackle	DT	Guard	G	Kickoff returner	KR
Offensive tackle	OT	Offensive lineman	OL	Linebacker	LB	Long snapper	LS
Punter	P	Placekicker	PK	Punt returner	PR	Quarterback	QB
Running back	RB	Safety	S	Tight end	TE	Wide receiver	WR
