= 2012 Iowa State Cyclones football team =

American college football season

2012 Iowa State Cyclones football

Liberty Bowl, L 17–31 vs. Tulsa
- Conference: Big 12 Conference
- Record: 6–7 (3–6 Big 12)
- Head coach: Paul Rhoads (4th season)
- Offensive coordinator: Courtney Messingham (1st season)
- Offensive scheme: Spread, zone read
- Defensive coordinator: Wally Burnham (4th season)
- Base defense: 4–3
- Home stadium: Jack Trice Stadium

2012 Big 12 Conference football standings
	Conf.			Overall
Team	W		L	W		L
No. 12 Kansas State $+	8	–	1	11	–	2
No. 15 Oklahoma +	8	–	1	10	–	3
No. 19 Texas	5	–	4	9	–	4
Oklahoma State	5	–	4	8	–	5
Baylor	4	–	5	8	–	5
TCU	4	–	5	7	–	6
Texas Tech	4	–	5	8	–	5
West Virginia	4	–	5	7	–	6
Iowa State	3	–	6	6	–	7
Kansas	0	–	9	1	–	11
$ – BCS representative as conference champion; + – Conference co-champions; Rankings from AP Poll

The 2012 Iowa State Cyclones football team represented Iowa State University as a member of Big 12 Conference during the 2012 NCAA Division I FBS football season. Led by fourth-year head coach Paul Rhoads, the Cyclones compiled an overall record of 6–7 with a mark of 3–6 in conference play, placing ninth in the Big 12. Iowa State was invited to the Liberty Bowl, where the Cyclones lost to Tulsa, a team they had defeated in the season opener. The team played home games at Jack Trice Stadium in Ames, Iowa.

== Schedule ==
Date	Time	Opponent	Site	TV	Result	Attendance	Source
September 1	2:30 p.m.	Tulsa*	Jack Trice Stadium; Ames, IA	FSN	W 38–23	54,931	
September 8	2:30 p.m.	at Iowa*	Kinnick Stadium; Iowa City, IA (rivalry)	BTN	W 9–6	70,585	
September 15	7:00 p.m.	Western Illinois*	Jack Trice Stadium; Ames, IA	CYtv	W 37–3	55,783	
September 29	6:00 p.m.	Texas Tech	Jack Trice Stadium; Ames, IA	FCS Central	L 13–24	54,149	
October 6	2:30 p.m.	at No. 15 TCU	Amon G. Carter Stadium; Fort Worth, TX	FSN	W 37–23	42,152	
October 13	11:00 a.m.	No. 6 Kansas State	Jack Trice Stadium; Ames, IA (rivalry)	FX	L 21–27	56,800	
October 20	11:00 a.m.	at Oklahoma State	Boone Pickens Stadium; Stillwater, OK	FX	L 10–31	57,019	
October 27	6:00 p.m.	Baylor^{†}	Jack Trice Stadium; Ames, IA	FSN	W 35–21	54,877	
November 3	11:00 a.m.	No. 14 Oklahoma	Jack Trice Stadium; Ames, IA	ABC	L 20–35	56,585	
November 10	11:00 a.m.	at No. 19 Texas	Darrell K Royal–Texas Memorial Stadium; Austin, TX	LHN*	L 7–33	100,018	
November 17	6:00 p.m.	at Kansas	Memorial Stadium; Lawrence, KS	FSN	W 51–23	41,608	
November 23	2:30 p.m.	West Virginia	Jack Trice Stadium; Ames, IA	ABC	L 24–31	53,792	
December 31	2:30 p.m.	vs. Tulsa*	Liberty Bowl Memorial Stadium; Memphis, TN (Liberty Bowl)	ESPN	L 17–31	53,687	
*Non-conference game; ^{†}Homecoming; Rankings from AP Poll released prior to the game; All times are in Central time

*Game shown on ABC stations in Iowa.

== Rankings ==
In the preseason USA Today Coaches' Poll and Associated Press Top 25 Poll Iowa State didn't receive any points. In the week one (September 2) coaches poll Iowa State was ranked T–40th receiving 10 points. In the week one (September 2) AP poll Iowa State was ranked T–38th with 3 points. In the week two (September 9) coaches poll Iowa State was ranked 40th receiving 10 points. In the week two (September 9) AP poll Iowa State was ranked T–39th with 5 points. In the week three (September 16) coaches poll Iowa State was ranked T–31st receiving 29 points. In the week three (September 16) AP poll Iowa State was ranked 33rd with 15 points. In the week four (September 23) coaches poll Iowa State was ranked 29th receiving 45 points. In the week four (September 23) AP poll Iowa State was ranked 32nd with 16 points. In the week five (September 30) coaches poll Iowa State was not ranked and didn't receive any votes. In the week five (September 30) AP poll Iowa State was ranked T–38th with 3 points. In the week six (October 7) coaches poll Iowa State was ranked 25th receiving 73 points. In the week six (October 7) AP poll Iowa State was ranked 28th with 54 points.

Ranking movements Legend: ██ Increase in ranking ██ Decrease in ranking — = Not ranked RV = Received votes
	Week															
Poll	Pre	1	2	3	4	5	6	7	8	9	10	11	12	13	14	Final
AP	—	RV	RV	RV	RV	RV	RV	—	—	—	—	—	RV	—	—	—
Coaches	—	RV	RV	RV	RV	—	25	RV	—	—	—	—	—	—	—	—
Harris	Not released						25	RV	RV	—	—	—	—	—	—	Not released
BCS	Not released							24	—	—	—	—	—	—	—	Not released

== Game summaries ==
=== Game 1: vs. Tulsa Golden Hurricane ===
Game One: Tulsa Golden Hurricane at Iowa State Cyclones – Game summary

Quarter	1	2	3	4	Total
Golden Hurricane	16	0	0	7	23
Cyclones	7	17	7	7	38

at Jack Trice Stadium, Ames, IA

- Date: September 1
- Game time: 2:30 p.m. CDT
- Game weather: Temperature: 85° • Wind: SE 5–10 • Weather: overcast
- Game attendance: 54,931
- Referee: Referee: Rick Loumiet • Umpire: Rick Podraza • Linesman: Bill Scott • Line judge: Keith Garmond • Back judge: Donnie Aultman • Field judge: Jason Lede • Side judge: Bill Stimmel • Scorer: Shuey/Pope
- TV announcers (FSN): Mark Followill (Play-by-Play) & Gary Reasons (Color)

Game information

First quarter

- ISU – 07:51 Josh Lenz 43 yd pass from Steele Jantz, Edwin Arceo XP good (ISU 7–0)
- TUL - 06:39 Safety (ISU 7–2)
- TUL – 02:31 Ja'Terian Douglas 1 yd run, Cody Green pass to Thomas Roberson good (TUL 10–7)
- TUL – 04:30 Thomas Roberson 6 yd pass from Cody Green, Daniel Schwarz XP blocked (TUL 16–7)

Second quarter

- ISU – 11:55 Steele Jantz 5 yd run, Edwin Arceo XP good (TUL 16–14)
- ISU – 09:18 Ernst Brun Jr. 7 yd pass from Steele Jantz, Edwin Arceo XP good (ISU 21–16)
- ISU - 00:00 Edwin Arceo 30 yd field goal good (ISU 24–16)

Third quarter

- ISU – 05:08 James White 6 yd run, Edwin Arceo XP good (ISU 31–16)

Fourth quarter

- TUL – 04:30 Keyarris Garrett 4 yd pass from Cody Green, Daniel Schwarz XP good (ISU 31–23)
- ISU – 00:40 Shontrelle Johnson 5 yd run, Edwin Arceo XP good (ISU 38–23)

Top passers

- TUL – Cody Green 23/49, 198 yards, 2 TD, 2 INT
- ISU – Steele Jantz 32/45, 281 yards, 2 TD, 1 INT

Top rushers

- TUL – Trey Watts 10 attempts, 125 yards
- ISU – Shontrelle Johnson 18 attempts, 120 yards, 1 TD

Top receivers

- TUL – Bryan Burnham 9 receptions, 90 yards
- ISU – Josh Lenz 8 receptions, 96 yards, 1 TD

Top tacklers

- TUL – Marco Nelson 13 tackles
- ISU – Jake Knott 11 tackles

=== Game 2: at Iowa Hawkeyes ===
Game Two: Iowa State Cyclones at Iowa Hawkeyes – Game summary

Quarter	1	2	3	4	Total
Cyclones	6	3	0	0	9
Hawkeyes	3	0	0	3	6

at Kinnick Stadium, Iowa City, IA

- Date: September 8
- Game time: 2:42 p.m. CDT
- Game weather: Temperature: 69° • Wind: WNW 7 • Weather: Sunny
- Game attendance: 70,585
- Referee: Referee: Tom Walker • Umpire: John Mascarello • Linesman: Bradford Edward • Line judge: David Oliver • Back judge: Brad Van Vark • Field judge: Scott Gaines • Side judge: Anthony Flemmin
- TV announcers (BTN): Kevin Kugler (Play-by-play), Chuck Long (Color), Chris Martin (Color) & Jon Jansen (Sideline)

Game information

First quarter

- ISU – 09:55 Aaron Horne 5 yd pass from Steele Jantz, Edwin Arceo XP no good (ISU 6–0)
- IOWA - 04:49 Mike Meyer 23 yd field goal good (ISU 6–3)

Second quarter

- ISU - 11:13 Edwin Arceo 22 yd field goal good (ISU 9–3)

Fourth quarter

- IOWA - 14:06 Mike Meyer 21 yd field goal good (ISU 9–6)

Top passers

- ISU – Steele Jantz 24/36, 241 yards, 1 TD, 2 INT
- IOWA – James Vanderberg 20/42, 236 yards, 2 INT

Top rushers

- ISU – Steele Jantz 14 attempts, 40 yards
- IOWA – Damon Bullock 22 attempts, 53 yards

Top receivers

- ISU – Aaron Horne 6 receptions, 73 yards, 1 TD
- IOWA – Keenan Davis 4 receptions, 75 yards

Top tacklers

- ISU – Durrell Givens 9 tackles
- IOWA – Anthony Hitchens 19 tackles

=== Game 3: vs. Western Illinois Leathernecks ===
Game Three: Western Illinois Leathernecks vs Iowa State Cyclones – Game summary

Quarter	1	2	3	4	Total
Leathernecks	0	0	0	3	3
Cyclones	14	7	10	6	37

at Jack Trice Stadium, Ames, IA

- Date: September 15
- Game time: 7:01 p.m. CDT
- Game weather: Temperature: 76° • Wind: SW 0-5 • Weather: Clear
- Game attendance: 55,783
- Referee: Referee: Cooper Castleberry • Umpire: Matt Richards • Linesman: Andy Warner • Line judge: Mark Stewart • Back judge: Joel Wetzel • Field judge: Tom Bessant • Side judge: Dave Curschman • Scorer: Shuey/Pope

Game information

First quarter

- ISU – 13:10 James White 56 yd run, Edwin Arceo XP good (ISU 7–0)
- ISU – 09:34 Chris Young 16 yd pass from Steele Jantz, Edwin Arceo XP good (ISU 14–0)

Second quarter

- ISU – 00:56 Chris Young 5 yd pass from Steele Jantz, Edwin Arceo XP good (ISU 21–0)

Third quarter

- ISU – 12:27 Aaron Horne 22 yd pass from Steele Jantz, Edwin Arceo XP good (ISU 28–0)
- ISU - 04:17 Edwin Arceo 49 yd field goal good (ISU 31–0)

Fourth quarter

- WIU - 14:09 Pat Smith 26 yd field goal good (ISU 31–3)
- ISU – 01:49 Rob Standard 1 yd run, Brett Bueker pass failed (ISU 37–3)

Top passers

- WIU – Josh Hudson 9/18, 73 yards
- ISU – Steele Jantz 19/26, 209 yards, 3 TD, 1 INT

Top rushers

- WIU – Nikko Watson 17 attempts, 76 yards
- ISU – James White 5 attempts, 72 yards, 1 TD

Top receivers

- WIU – Justin Morgan 4 receptions, 32 yards
- ISU – Chris Young 7 receptions, 86 yards, 2 TD

Top tacklers

- WIU – J. J. Raffelson 8 tackles
- ISU – Jeremiah George 9 tackles

=== Game 4: vs. Texas Tech Red Raiders ===
Game Four: Texas Tech Red Raiders at Iowa State Cyclones – Game summary

Quarter	1	2	3	4	Total
Red Raiders	0	7	7	10	24
Cyclones	7	0	6	0	13

at Jack Trice Stadium, Ames, IA

- Date: September 29
- Game time: 6:06 p.m. CDT
- Game weather: Temperature: 79° • Wind: NW 0-5 • Weather: Clear
- Game attendance: 54,149
- Referee: Referee: Mike Defee • Umpire: Robert Richeson • Linesman: Al Green • Line judge: Walt Coleman • Back judge: Dax Hill • Field judge: Mike Cuttone • Side judge: Eugene Hall • Scorer: Shuey/Pope
- TV announcers (FCS Central): Mike Gleason (Play-by-play), Dave Lapham (Color) & Lesley McCaslin (Sideline)

Game information

First quarter

- ISU – 01:42 A. J. Klein 86 yd interception return, Edwin Arceo XP good (ISU 7–0)

Second quarter

- TTU – 01:32 Grant Jakeem 11 yd pass from Seth Doege, Ryan Bustin XP good (Tied 7–7)

Third quarter

- ISU – 04:26 Ernst Brun 5 yd pass from Steele Jantz, Edwin Arceo XP no good (ISU 13–7)
- TTU – 01:01 Darrin Moore 4 yd pass from Seth Doege, Ryan Bustin XP good (TTU 14–13)

Fourth quarter

- TTU – 01:01 Darrin Moore 4 yd pass from Seth Doege, Ryan Bustin XP good (TTU 21–13)
- TTU - 02:20 Ryan Bustin 39 yd field goal good (TTU 24–13)

Top passers

- TTU – Seth Doege 30/46, 331 yards, 3 TD, 2 INT
- ISU – Steele Jantz 10/20, 73 yards, 1 TD, 3 INT

Top rushers

- TTU – Kenny Williams 15 attempts, 80 yards
- ISU – James White 9 attempts, 57 yards

Top receivers

- TTU – Eric Ward 9 receptions, 122 yards, 1 TD
- ISU – James White 4 receptions, 30 yards

Top tacklers

- TTU – Will Smith 7 tackles
- ISU – Jacques Washington 12 tackles

=== Game 5: at TCU Horned Frogs ===
Game Five: Iowa State Cyclones at TCU Horned Frogs – Game summary

Quarter	1	2	3	4	Total
Cyclones	16	0	7	14	37
Horned Frogs	7	3	10	3	23

at Amon G. Carter Stadium, Fort Worth, TX

- Date: October 6
- Game time: 2:36 p.m. CDT
- Game weather: Temperature: 53° • Wind: N 14 • Weather: Cloudy
- Game attendance: 42,152
- Referee: Referee: Randy Christal • Umpire: Jim Adams • Linesman: Cal McNeill • Line judge: Kelly Deterding • Back judge: Terry Jones • Field judge: Joe Blubaugh • Side judge: Freeman Johns • Scorer: Ben Dobson
- TV announcers (FSN): Mike Morgan (Play-by-play), J. C. Pearson (Color) & Laura McKeeman (Sideline)

Game information

First quarter

- ISU – 13:48 Josh Lenz 51 yd pass from Jared Barnett, Edwin Arceo XP good (ISU 7–0)
- ISU – 09:38 Edwin Arceo 46 yd field goal good (ISU 10–0)
- TCU – 01:50 Aundre Dean 7 yd pass from Trevone Boykin, Jaden Oberkrom XP good (ISU 10–7)
- ISU – 01:07 Josh Lenz 74 yd pass from Jared Barnett, Edwin Arceo XP no good (ISU 16–7)

Second quarter

- TCU – 01:14 Jaden Oberkrom 38 yd field goal good (ISU 16–10)

Third quarter

- ISU – 10:24 Josh Lenz 1 yd pass from Jared Barnett, Edwin Arceo XP good (ISU 23–10)
- TCU – 08:20 Laderice Sanders 1 yd run, Jaden Oberkrom XP good (ISU 23–17)
- TCU – 02:36 Jaden Oberkrom 50 yd field goal good (ISU 23–20)

Fourth quarter

- ISU – 13:33 Ernst Brun 15 yd pass from Jared Barnett, Edwin Arceo XP good (ISU 30–20)
- TCU – 09:51 Jaden Oberkrom 39 yd field goal good (ISU 30–23)
- ISU – 07:51 David Irving 20 yd interception return, Edwin Arceo XP good (ISU 37–23)

Top passers

- ISU – Jared Barnett 12/21, 183 yards, 3 TD, 1 INT
- TCU – Trevone Boykin 23/40, 270 yards, 1 TD, 3 INT

Top rushers

- ISU – James White 11 attempts, 53 yards
- TCU – B. J. Catalon 13 attempts, 86 yards

Top receivers

- ISU – Josh Lenz 5 receptions, 147 yards, 3 TD
- TCU – Brandon Carter 6 receptions, 94 yards

Top tacklers

- ISU – Jake Knott 13 tackles
- TCU – Sam Carter 8 tackles

=== Game 6: vs. Kansas State Wildcats ===
Game Six: Kansas State Wildcats at Iowa State Cyclones – Game summary

Quarter	1	2	3	4	Total
Wildcats	3	14	7	3	27
Cyclones	0	14	0	7	21

at Jack Trice Stadium, Ames, IA

- Date: October 13
- Game time: 11:06 a.m. CDT
- Game weather: Temperature: 61° • Wind: S 10–15 • Weather: Overcast, mist
- Game attendance: 56,800
- Referee: Referee: Reggie Smith • Umpire: Robert Richeson • Linesman: Mike Moeller • Line judge: Kevin Vicknair • Back judge: Corey Luxner • Field judge: Jack G. Taylor III • Side judge: Tim Murray • Scorer: Shuey/Pope
- TV announcers (FX): Justin Kutcher (Play-by-play), Eric Crouch (Color), & Darius Walker (Sideline)

Game information

First quarter

- KSU – 06:58 Anthony Cantele 41 yd field goal good (KSU 3–0)

Second quarter

- ISU – 14:58 Shontrelle Johnson 2 yd pass from Jared Barnett, Edwin Arceo XP good (ISU 7–3)
- KSU – 08:18 Collin Klein 2 yd run, Anthony Cantele XP good (KSU 10–7)
- ISU – 02:27 Ernst Brun 30 yd pass from Jared Barnett, Edwin Arceo XP good (ISU 14–10)
- KSU – 00:49 Collin Klein 6 yd run, Anthony Cantele XP good (KSU 17–14)

Third quarter

- KSU – 01:33 Collin Klein 12 yd run, Anthony Cantele XP good (KSU 24–14)

Fourth quarter

- ISU – 12:34 Jeff Woody 2 yd run, Edwin Arceo XP good (KSU 24–21)
- KSU – 04:24 Anthony Cantele 25 yd field goal good (KSU 27–21)

Top passers

- KSU – Collin Klein 16/24, 187 yards
- ISU – Jared Barnett 16/36, 166 yards, 2 TD, 1 INT

Top rushers

- KSU – Collin Klein 25 attempts, 105 yards, 3 TD
- ISU – Jared Barnett 8 attempts, 35 yards

Top receivers

- KSU – Tyler Lockett 2 receptions, 55 yards
- ISU – Aaron Horne 7 receptions, 84 yards

Top tacklers

- KSU – Randall Evans 9 tackles
- ISU – Jake Knott 13 tackles

=== Game 7: at Oklahoma State Cowboys ===
Game Seven: Iowa State Cyclones at Oklahoma State Cowboys – Game summary

Quarter	1	2	3	4	Total
Cyclones	10	0	0	0	10
Cowboys	7	10	7	7	31

at Boone Pickens Stadium, Stillwater, OK

- Date: October 20
- Game time: CDT
- Game weather: Temperature: 66° • Wind: S 8 • Weather: Sunny
- Game attendance: 57,019
- Referee: Referee: Scott Novak • Umpire: Kevin Matthews • Linesman: Doug Moore • Line judge: Frank LeBlanc • Back judge: Lyndon Nixon • Field judge: Nick Lave • Side judge: Shane Standley
- TV announcers (FX): Justin Kutcher (Play-by-play), Eric Crouch (Color), & Darius Walker (Sideline)

Game information

First quarter

- ISU – 12:17 Jeff Woody 2 yd pass from Jared Barnett, Edwin Arceo XP good (ISU 7–0)
- OSU – 05:53 Joseph Randle 4 yd run, Quinn Sharp XP good (Tied 7–7)
- ISU – 03:17 Edwin Arceo 41 yd field goal good (ISU 10–7)

Second quarter

- OSU – 14:28 Quinn Sharp 20 yd field goal good (Tied 10–10)
- OSU – 12:52 Charlie Moore 74 yd pass from J. W. Walsh, Quinn Sharp XP good (OSU 17–10)

Third quarter

- OSU – 09:32 Joseph Randle 12 yd run, Quinn Sharp XP good (OSU 24–10)

Fourth quarter

- OSU – 10:09 J. W. Walsh 3 yd run, Quinn Sharp XP good (OSU 31–10)

Top passers

- ISU – Jared Barnett 19/39, 206 yards, 1 TD, 1 INT
- OSU – J. W. Walsh 32/47, 415 yards, 1 TD

Top rushers

- ISU – Jared Barnett 6 attempts, 49 yards
- OSU – Joseph Randle 24 attempts, 151 yards, 2 TD

Top receivers

- ISU – Aaron Horne 8 receptions, 75 yards
- OSU – Charlie Moore 8 receptions, 129 yards, 1 TD

Top tacklers

- ISU – Durrell Givens 12 tackles
- OSU – Caleb Lavey 6 tackles

=== Game 8: vs. Baylor Bears ===
Game Eight: Baylor Bears at Iowa State Cyclones – Game summary

Quarter	1	2	3	4	Total
Bears	7	7	0	7	21
Cyclones	7	14	7	7	35

at Jack Trice Stadium, Ames, IA

- Date: October 27
- Game time: 6:06 p.m. CDT
- Game weather: Temperature: 40° • Wind: E 0–5 • Weather: Mostly Clear
- Game attendance: 54,877
- Referee: Referee: Rick Loumiet • Umpire: Rick Podraza • Linesman: Bill Scott • Line judge: Keith Garmond • Back judge: Donnie Aultman • Field judge: Jason Ledet • Side judge: Mike Contreraz • Scorer: Shuey/Pope
- TV announcers (FSN): Mike Morgan (Play-by-play), J. C. Pearson (Color), & Laura McKeeman (Sideline)

Game information

First quarter

- BAY – 05:20 Jarred Salubi 2 yd run, Aaron Jones XP good (Bay 7–0)
- ISU – 12:17 Jarvis West 23 yd pass from Steele Jantz, Edwin Arceo XP good (Tied 7–7)

Second quarter

- BAY – 14:53 Tevin Reese 49 yd pass from Nick Florence, Aaron Jones XP good (BAY 14–7)
- ISU – 08:49 Albert Gary 36 yd pass from Steele Jantz, Edwin Arceo XP good (Tied 14–14)
- ISU – 00:27 Jarvis West 7 yd pass from Steele Jantz, Edwin Arceo XP good (ISU 21–14)

Third quarter

- ISU – 04:16 Jeff Woody 8 yd pass from Steele Jantz, Edwin Arceo XP good (ISU 28–14)

Fourth quarter

- ISU – 08:37 Jarvis West 22 yd pass from Steele Jantz, Edwin Arceo XP good (ISU 35–14)
- BAY – 06:14 Lanear Sampson 3 yd pass from Nick Florence, Aaron Jones XP good (ISU 35–21)

Top passers

- BAY – Nick Florence 31/51, 426 yards, 2 TD, 1 INT
- ISU – Steele Jantz 36/52, 381 yards, 5 TD, 1 INT

Top rushers

- BAY – Lache Seastrunk 7 attempts, 30 yards
- ISU – Shontrelle Johnson 16 attempts, 73 yards

Top receivers

- BAY – Terrance Williams 13 receptions, 190 yards
- ISU – Jarvis West 7 receptions, 99 yards, 3 TD

Top tacklers

- BAY – Sam Holl 13 tackles
- ISU – A. J. Klein 13 tackles

=== Game 9: vs. Oklahoma Sooners ===
Game Nine: Oklahoma Sooners at Iowa State Cyclones – Game summary

Quarter	1	2	3	4	Total
Sooners	0	14	14	7	35
Cyclones	0	6	7	7	20

at Jack Trice Stadium, Ames, IA

- Date: November 3
- Game time: 11:07 a.m. CDT
- Game weather: Temperature: 45° • Wind: NNE 0–5 • Weather: mostly sunny
- Game attendance: 56,585
- Referee: Referee: Tom Walker • Umpire: Scott Teifer • Linesman: Al Green • Line judge: David Oliver • Back judge: Terry White • Field judge: Scott Gaines • Side judge: Tony Flemming • Scorer: Shuey/Pope
- TV announcers (ABC): Mike Patrick (Play-by-play), Ed Cunningham (Color) & Jeannine Edwards (Sideline)

Game information

Second quarter

- OU – 10:00 Sterling Shepard 20 yd pass from Landry Jones, Michael Hunnicutt XP good (OU 7–0)
- ISU – 04:10 Edwin Arceo 27 yd field goal (OU 7–3)
- ISU – 01:04 Edwin Arceo 51 yd field goal (OU 7–6)
- OU – 00:14 Kenny Stills 21 yd pass from Landry Jones, Michael Hunnicutt XP good (OU 14–6)

Third quarter

- OU – 08:52 Justin Brown 20 yd pass from Landry Jones, Michael Hunnicutt XP good (OU 21–6)
- ISU – 05:49 Jarvis West 19 yd run, Edwin Arceo XP good (OU 21–13)
- OU – 02:04 Brennan Clay 18 yd run, Michael Hunnicutt XP good (OU 28–13)

Fourth quarter

- OU – 10:59 Kenny Stills 31 yd pass from Landry Jones, Michael Hunnicutt XP good (OU 35–13)
- ISU – 06:32 Shontrelle Johnson 2 yd run, Edwin Arceo XP good (OU 35–20)

Top passers

- OU – Landry Jones 32/45, 405 yards, 4 TD, 2 INT
- ISU – Steele Jantz 13/25, 177 yards

Top rushers

- OU – Brennan Clay 24 attempts, 157 yards, 1 TD
- ISU – Shontrelle Johnson 7 attempts, 28 yards, 1 TD

Top receivers

- OU – Justin Brown 7 receptions, 107 yards, 1 TD
- ISU – Quenton Bundrage 4 receptions, 44 yards

Top tacklers

- OU – Tony Jefferson 9 tackles
- ISU – Jeremiah George 17 tackles

=== Game 10: at Texas Longhorns ===
Game Ten: Iowa State Cyclones at Texas Longhorns – Game summary

Quarter	1	2	3	4	Total
Cyclones	0	7	0	0	7
Longhorns	14	6	3	10	33

at Darrell K Royal–Texas Memorial Stadium, Austin, TX

- Date: November 10
- Game time: 11:08 a.m. CST
- Game weather: Temperature: 78° • Wind: S 15–20 • Weather: partly cloudy
- Game attendance: 100,018
- Referee: Referee: Greg Burks • Umpire: Jim Adams • Linesman: George Gusman • Line judge: Kevin Mar • Back judge: Brian Ernest • Field judge: Scott Gaines • Side judge: Tony Flemming • Scorer: Shuey/Pope
- TV announcers (Longhorn Network/ABC): Mark Neely (Play–by–play), Ray Bentley (Color) & Kaylee Hartung (Sideline) (ABC); Mike Patrick (Play-by-play), Ed Cunningham (color) & Jeannine Edwards (Sideline) (Longhorn Network)

Game information

First quarter

- UT – 04:34 Johnathan Gray 5 yd run, Anthony Fera XP good (UT 7–0)
- UT – 03:23 Mike Davis 61 yd pass from David Ash, Anthony Fera XP good (UT 14–0)

Second quarter

- UT – 02:53 Barrett Matthews 3 yd pass from David Ash, Anthony Fera XP no good (UT 20–0)
- ISU – 00:41 Quenton Bundrage 14 yd pass from Steele Jantz, Edwin Arceo XP good (UT 20–7)

Third quarter

- UT – 10:31 Nick Jordan 37 yd field goal (UT 23–7)

Fourth quarter

- UT – 12:32 Johnathan Gray 13 yd run, Nick Jordan XP good (UT 30–7)
- UT – 01:23 Nick Jordan 25 yd field goal (UT 33–7)

Top passers

- ISU – Steele Jantz 15/29, 133 yards, 1 TD, 2 INT
- UT – David Ash 25/31, 364 yards, 2 TD

Top rushers

- ISU – Shontrelle Johnson 9 attempts, 57 yards
- UT – Joe Bergeron 12 attempts, 86 yards

Top receivers

- ISU – Chris Young 1 reception, 23 yards
- UT – Jaxon Shipley 8 receptions, 137 yards

Top tacklers

- ISU – Durrell Givens 11 tackles
- UT – Alex Okafor 9 tackles

=== Game 11: at Kansas Jayhawks ===
Game Eleven: Iowa State Cyclones at Kansas Jayhawks – Game summary

Quarter	1	2	3	4	Total
Cyclones	10	28	3	10	51
Jayhawks	7	10	0	6	23

at Memorial Stadium, Lawrence, KS

- Date: November 17
- Game time: 6:06 p.m. CST
- Game weather: Temperature: 52° • Wind: SSE 11 • Weather: clear
- Game attendance: 41,608
- Referee: Referee: Dan Romeo • Umpire: Scott Teifer • Linesman: Rick Smith • Line judge: Mark Bovos • Back judge: Terry White • Field judge: Bobby Bernard • Side judge: Criag Faulkner • Scorer: Beau White
- TV announcers (FSN): Steve Physioc (Play-by-play), J. C. Pearson (Color) & Laura McKeeman (Sideline)

Game information

First quarter

- ISU – 10:18 Edwin Arceo 37 yd field goal (ISU 3–0)
- KU – 04:22 Taylor Cox 2 yd run, Nick Prolago XP good (KU 7–3)
- ISU – 00:36 Jeff Woody 11 yd run, Edwin Arceo XP good (ISU 10–7)

Second quarter

- KU – 14:50 Tony Pierson 55 yd run, Nick Prolago XP good (KU 14–10)
- ISU – 11:23 Albert Gary 11 yd pass from Sam B. Richardson, Edwin Arceo XP good (ISU 17–14)
- ISU – 08:41 Aaron Horne 30 yd pass from Sam B. Richardson, Edwin Arceo XP good (ISU 24–14)
- ISU – 03:33 Sam B. Richardson 1 yd run, Edwin Arceo XP good (ISU 31–14)
- ISU – 01:01 Ernst Brun 20 yd pass from Sam B. Richardson, Edwin Arceo XP good (ISU 38–14)
- KU – 00:00 Nick Prolago 21 yd field goal (ISU 38–17)

Third quarter

- ISU – 01:35 Edwin Arceo 51 yd field goal (ISU 41–17)

Fourth quarter

- KU – 14:19 Tony Pierson 37 yd pass from Dayne Crist, Michael Cummings pass intercepted (ISU 41–24)
- ISU – 12:12 Josh Lenz 14 yd pass from Sam B. Richardson, Edwin Arceo XP good (ISU 48–24)
- ISU – 08:19 Edwin Arceo 47 yd field goal (ISU 51–24)

Top passers

- ISU – Sam B. Richardson 23/27, 250 yards, 4 TD
- KU – Dayne Crist 9/20, 156 yards, 1 TD, 1 INT

Top rushers

- ISU – Jeff Woody 9 attempts, 89 yards, 1 TD
- KU – James Sims 20 attempts, 81 yards

Top receivers

- ISU – Josh Lenz 6 reception, 78 yards, 1 TD
- KU – Jimmay Mundine 3 receptions, 63 yards

Top tacklers

- ISU – Willie Scott 8 tackles
- KU – Ben Heeney 13 tackles

=== Game 12: vs. West Virginia Mountaineers ===
Game Twelve: West Virginia Mountaineers at Iowa State Cyclones – Game summary

Quarter	1	2	3	4	Total
Mountaineers	3	14	3	11	31
Cyclones	0	14	7	3	24

at Jack Trice Stadium, Ames, IA

- Date: November 23
- Game time: 2:36 p.m. CST
- Game weather: Temperature: 32° • Wind: NW 15 • Weather: clear
- Game attendance: 53,792
- Referee: Referee: Reggie Smith • Umpire: Michael Cooper • Linesman: Mike Moeller • Line judge: Kevin Vicknair • Back judge: Donnie Aultman • Field judge: Jack G. Taylor III • Side judge: Tim Murray • Scorer: Shuey/Pope
- TV announcers (ABC): Dave LaMont (Play-by-play) & Kelly Stouffer (Color)

Game information

First quarter

- WVU – 09:58 Tyler Bitancurt 42 yd field goal (WVU 3–0)

Second quarter

- WVU – 10:34 Shawne Alston 1 yd run, Tyler Bitancurt XP good (WVU 10–0)
- ISU – 07:57 Jerome Tiller 8 yd pass from Sam B. Richardson, Edwin Arceo XP good (WVU 10–7)
- WVU – 04:10 Stedman Bailey 6 yd pass from Geno Smith, Tyler Bitancurt XP good (WVU 17–7)
- ISU – 00:18 Josh Lenz 18 yd pass from Sam B. Richardson, Edwin Arceo XP good (WVU 17–14)

Third quarter

- WVU – 07:26 Tyler Bitancurt 44 yd field goal (WVU 20–14)
- ISU – 04:56 Quenton Bundrage 35 yd pass from Sam B. Richardson, Edwin Arceo XP good (ISU 21–20)

Fourth quarter

- WVU – 09:35 Tyler Bitancurt 35 yd field goal (WVU 23–20)
- ISU – 06:42 Edwin Arceo 49 yd field goal (ISU 24–23)
- WVU – 06:31 Tavon Austin 75 yd pass from Geno Smith, Tavon Austin rush (WVU 31–24)

Top passers

- WVU – Geno Smith 22/31, 236 yards, 2 TD
- ISU – Sam B. Richardson 13/31, 162 yards, 3 TD

Top rushers

- WVU – Shawne Alston 19 attempts, 130 yards, 1 TD
- ISU – Sam B. Richardson 18 attempts, 119 yards

Top receivers

- WVU – Tavon Austin 6 receptions, 99 yards, 1 TD
- ISU – Josh Lenz 4 reception, 48 yards, 1 TD

Top tacklers

- WVU – Karl Joseph 13 tackles
- ISU – A. J. Klein 14 tackles

=== Game 13: vs. Tulsa Golden Hurricane ===
Game Thirteen: Iowa State Cyclones vs. Tulsa Golden Hurricane – Game summary

Quarter	1	2	3	4	Total
Cyclones	17	0	0	0	17
Golden Hurricane	7	14	7	3	31

at Liberty Bowl Memorial Stadium, Memphis, TN

- Date: December 31
- Game time: 2:37 p.m. CST
- Game weather: Temperature: 47° • Wind: S 10 • Weather: cloudy
- Game attendance: 53,687
- Referee: Referee: Alan Eck • Umpire: Roscoe Meisenheimer • Linesman: Tim Croley • Line judge: Marc Bovos • Back judge: Chris Alston • Field judge: Nick Lave • Side judge: Fulton Carson • Scorer: UM Statcrew
- TV announcers (ESPN): Mark Jones (Play-by-play), Brock Huard (Color) & Jessica Mendoza (Sideline)

Game information

First quarter

- ISU – 10:47 Edwin Arceo 33 yd field goal (ISU 3–0)
- ISU – 07:44 Jeremy Reeves 31 yd interception return, Edwin Arceo XP good (ISU 10–0)
- TUL – 04:47 Alex Singleton 2 yd run, Daniel Schwarz XP good (ISU 10–7)
- ISU – 03:46 Ernst Brun 69 yd pass from Sam B. Richardson, Edwin Arceo XP good (ISU 17–7)

Second quarter

- TUL – 14:33 Cody Green 8 yd run, Daniel Schwarz XP good (ISU 17–14)
- TUL – 11:10 Alex Singleton 2 yd run, Daniel Schwarz XP good (TUL 21–17)

Third quarter

- TUL – 01:50 Alex Singleton 1 yd run, Daniel Schwarz XP good (TUL 28–17)

Fourth quarter

- TUL – 12:49 Daniel Schwarz 40 yd field goal (TUL 31–17)

Top passers

- ISU – Sam B. Richardson 10/21, 129 yards, 1 TD, 1 INT
- TUL – Cody Green 11/23, 93 yards, 1 INT

Top rushers

- ISU – Sam B. Richardson 10 attempts, 46 yards
- TUL – Trey Watts 25 attempts, 149 yards

Top receivers

- ISU – Ernst Brun 4 reception, 102 yards, 1 TD
- TUL – Thomas Roberson 2 receptions, 35 yards

Top tacklers

- ISU – A. J. Klein 19 tackles
- TUL – Shawn Jackson 9 tackles

== Personnel ==
=== Coaching staff ===
Name	Position	Seasons at Iowa State	Alma mater
Paul Rhoads	Head coach	4	Missouri Western (1989)
Wally Burnham	Defensive coordinator/linebackers	4	Samford (1963)
Courtney Messingham	Offensive coordinator/quarterbacks	4	Northern Iowa (1990)
Kenith Pope	Running backs	4	Oklahoma (1976)
Troy Douglas	Defensive backs	1	Appalachian State (1986)
Luke Wells	Tight ends	4	Oklahoma (2001)
Todd Sturdy	Wide receivers, Passing Game Coordinator	2	St. Ambrose (1990)
Curtis Bray	Defensive line	4	Pittsburgh (1992)
Bill Bleil	Assistant head coach/Offensive line coach	4	Northwestern College (1981)
