= Jakeem Grant =

American football player (born 1992)

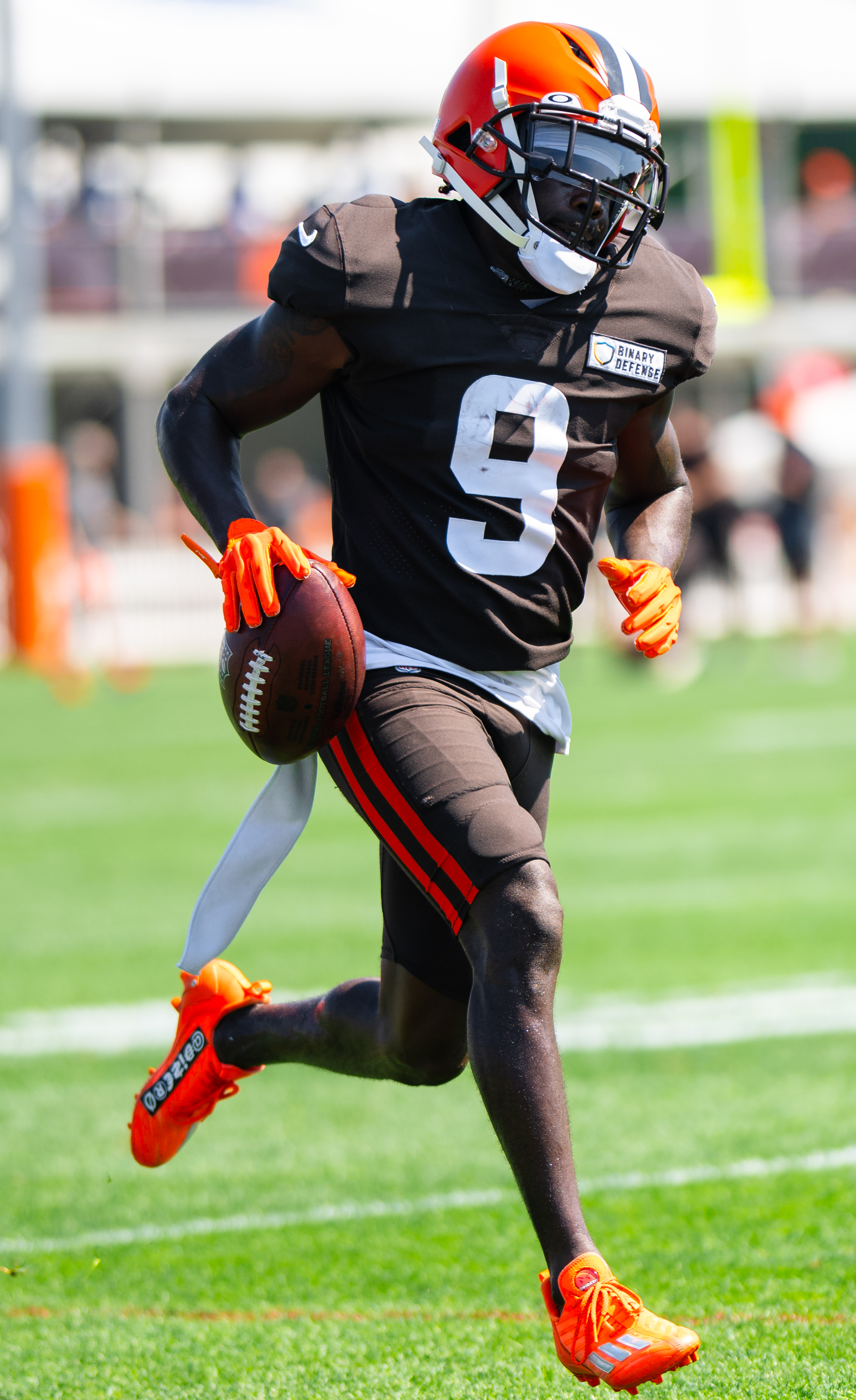
- Grant with the Cleveland Browns in 2023

No. 19, 17
- Positions: Wide receiver, return specialist

Personal information
- Born: October 30, 1992 (age 34); Mesquite, Texas, U.S.
- Listed height: 5 ft 6 in (1.68 m)
- Listed weight: 170 lb (77 kg)

Career information
- High school: John Horn (Mesquite)
- College: Texas Tech (2011–2015)
- NFL draft: 2016: 6th round, 186th overall pick

Career history
- Miami Dolphins (2016–2021); Chicago Bears (2021); Cleveland Browns (2022–2023); Atlanta Falcons (2024)*
- * Offseason or practice squad member only

Awards and highlights
- 2× Second-team All-Pro (2020, 2021) (Note: Selected as a punt returner); Pro Bowl (2021); Second-team All-American (2015); First-team All-Big 12 (2015)

Career NFL statistics
- Receptions: 100
- Receiving yards: 1,140
- Receiving touchdowns: 7
- Return yards: 3,927
- Return touchdowns: 6
- Rushing attempts: 17
- Rushing yards: 76
- Rushing touchdowns: 1
- Stats at Pro Football Reference

Jakeem Grant Sr. (born October 30, 1992) is an American former professional football player who was a wide receiver and return specialist in the National Football League (NFL). He was selected by the Miami Dolphins in the sixth round of the 2016 NFL draft and has also played for the Chicago Bears and Cleveland Browns. He played college football for the Texas Tech Red Raiders, where he set their all-time record for receiving yards. On December 12, 2021, Grant broke the Bears' franchise record for longest punt return for a touchdown by scoring on a 97-yard punt return in a game against the Green Bay Packers at Lambeau Field in Green Bay, Wisconsin. The return is the tenth longest punt returned for a touchdown in NFL history.

== Early life ==
Grant attended John Horn High School in Mesquite, Texas, and was a three-star prospect rated by Rivals.com. He held offers from Colorado State, Iowa State, Louisiana Tech, Pittsburgh, Texas Tech, Tulsa, Vanderbilt, and Wake Forest. He was originally committed to Tulsa but flipped his commitment to Texas Tech soon before Signing Day.

== College career ==
Grant redshirted during his first season in 2011. In the following 2012 season, Grant played in all 13 games and recorded 32 receptions, 287 yards, and three touchdowns. He returned a kickoff for a 99-yard touchdown in the 2012 Meineke Car Care Bowl of Texas. He earned ESPN All-Big 12 1st Team Freshman honors following the season.

In 2013, Grant played in 12 games for 65 receptions, 796 receiving yards, seven touchdowns, and was named All-Big 12 Conference Honorable Mention.

In 2014, Grant played in 12 games for 67 receptions, 938 receiving yards, seven touchdowns, and again earned All-Big 12 Conference Honorable Mention honors.

In his final season, in 2015, Grant was selected as a CBS Sports second-team All-American and an Associated Press third-team All-American in 2015 as an all-purpose player. Grant caught 90 passes for 1,268 yards and 10 touchdowns, which broke Biletnikoff Award winning Red Raider Michael Crabtree's school record in career yardage. Grant returned an additional two kickoffs for touchdowns during the season, setting the school record for the category.

During Texas Tech's Pro Day, a New Orleans Saints scout recorded his 40-yard dash speed at a hand-timed 4.1 seconds, potentially beating Bo Jackson's hand-timed 4.12 seconds at the NFL Combine in 1986. His electronically recorded 40 yard dash time is 4.34 seconds.

=== College statistics ===
Season	Team	GP	Receiving				Kick return			
Season	Team	GP	Rec	Yds	Avg	TD	Ret	Yds	Avg	TD
2012	Texas Tech	13	32	284	8.9	3	6	237	39.5	2
2013	Texas Tech	11	65	796	12.2	7	19	400	21.1	0
2014	Texas Tech	12	67	938	14.0	3	23	515	22.4	0
2015	Texas Tech	13	90	1,268	14.1	10	39	1,017	26.1	2
Total		49	254	3,286	12.9	27	87	2,169	24.9	4

== Professional career ==
Pre-draft measurables
Height	Weight	Arm length	Hand span	Wingspan	40-yard dash	10-yard split	20-yard split	20-yard shuttle	Three-cone drill	Vertical jump	Broad jump	Bench press
5 ft 5 7/8 in (1.67 m)	165 lb (75 kg)	29 3/4 in (0.76 m)	8 5/8 in (0.22 m)	5 ft 11 in (1.80 m)	4.38 s	1.54 s	2.58 s	4.06 s	7.01 s	36.5 in (0.93 m)	9 ft 9 in (2.97 m)	15 reps
All values from Texas Tech Pro Day

=== Miami Dolphins ===
After running a 4.42 and 4.38 40-yard dash at his Texas Tech pro day, Grant was selected by the Miami Dolphins in the sixth round, 186th overall, of the 2016 NFL draft. On October 9, 2016, Grant's first career touchdown came on a 74-yard punt return against the Tennessee Titans in Week 5 of his rookie season. The return made 'NFL Now's Top 5 Most Athletic Plays' list at number 1. In the 2016 season, he contributed as a returner on special teams.

In the 2017 season, Grant appeared in all 16 games and recorded 13 receptions for 203 receiving yard and two receiving touchdowns. He contributed on kickoff and punt returns on special teams.

In Week 1 of the 2018 season, Grant had a 102-yard kick off return touchdown in a 27–20 win over the Titans, earning him American Football Conference (AFC) Special Teams Player of the Week. In Week 3, against the Oakland Raiders, he had two receptions for 70 yards and two touchdowns in the victory. Grant recorded a 70-yard punt return touchdown in Week 5 against the Cincinnati Bengals. He suffered an Achilles injury in Week 10 and underwent season-ending surgery.

On August 20, 2019, Grant signed a four-year contract extension with the Dolphins. In Week 11 in the 2019 season, Grant returned a kickoff for a touchdown, this for 101 yards in a 37–20 loss against the Buffalo Bills. On November 27, Grant was placed on injured reserve with a high ankle sprain. In the 2019 season, he appeared in ten games and recorded 19 receptions for 164 receiving yards.

On November 1, 2020, against the Los Angeles Rams, Grant returned a punt for an 88 yard touchdown during the 28–17 win. During the game, Grant set three Dolphins team franchise records: longest punt return (88 yds), three career punt returns for a touchdown, and five returns for a touchdown. On November 4, 2020, Grant was named the AFC Special Teams Player of the Week for his performance in Week 8. Once the season concluded Grant earned Second-team All-Pro honors for his performance as a punt returner. Grant appeared in 14 games and recorded 36 receptions for 373 receiving yards and one receiving touchdown.

=== Chicago Bears ===
Grant was traded to the Chicago Bears on October 5, 2021, in exchange for a sixth-round selection in the 2023 NFL draft. His first appearance on the team was in week 5 in a game against the Las Vegas Raiders.

In Week 13, Grant had five receptions for 62 yards and a touchdown in a 33–22 loss to the Arizona Cardinals. In Week 14, Grant had one reception for 46 yards and a touchdown, and also returned a punt for a 97 yard touchdown, each in the first half, in the 45–30 loss to the Green Bay Packers, earning NFC Special Teams Player of the Week. He was named to the Pro Bowl.

=== Cleveland Browns ===
On March 16, 2022, Grant signed a three-year contract with the Cleveland Browns. He was placed on injured reserve on August 10, 2022, after injuring his Achilles tendon during practice.

In the final game of the 2023 preseason, Grant was carted off with a knee injury. He was diagnosed with a ruptured patellar tendon and was placed on injured reserve on August 27, 2023, ending his season.

=== Atlanta Falcons ===
On August 11, 2024, Grant signed with the Atlanta Falcons, but was placed on injured reserve four days later, and then released. He was re-signed to the practice squad on November 12 but released four days later.

Grant announced his retirement from professional football on March 11, 2026.

== Personal life ==
He grew up in a Dallas, Texas, single parent home with his mom, Sylvia Whittaker, and two brothers, Markeith Whittaker and Keonte Grant. Grant attended John Horn High School. He was stabbed in a nightclub in 2014. He is now married and has three children.

In 2016, Grant starred in the NFL Network's TV series Undrafted.
