= 2012 Kansas Jayhawks football team =

American college football season

2012 Kansas Jayhawks football
- Conference: Big 12 Conference
- Record: 1–11 (0–9 Big 12)
- Head coach: Charlie Weis (1st season)
- Offensive scheme: Multiple
- Defensive coordinator: Dave Campo (1st season)
- Base defense: Multiple
- Captains: Dayne Crist; Tanner Hawkinson; Toben Opurum
- Home stadium: Memorial Stadium

2012 Big 12 Conference football standings
	Conf.			Overall
Team	W		L	W		L
No. 12 Kansas State $+	8	–	1	11	–	2
No. 15 Oklahoma +	8	–	1	10	–	3
No. 19 Texas	5	–	4	9	–	4
Oklahoma State	5	–	4	8	–	5
Baylor	4	–	5	8	–	5
TCU	4	–	5	7	–	6
Texas Tech	4	–	5	8	–	5
West Virginia	4	–	5	7	–	6
Iowa State	3	–	6	6	–	7
Kansas	0	–	9	1	–	11
$ – BCS representative as conference champion; + – Conference co-champions; Rankings from AP Poll

The 2012 Kansas Jayhawks football team represented the University of Kansas in the 2012 NCAA Division I FBS football season. The Jayhawks were led by new head coach Charlie Weis and played their home games at Memorial Stadium. They were a member of the Big 12 Conference. They finished the season with 1–11 overall, 0–9 in Big 12, finishing in last place and failing to be bowl eligible (alone in Big 12 teams in doing so).

== Pre-season ==
=== Coaching change ===
The Jayhawks fired head coach Turner Gill after going 2–10 in his second year in 2011. He was replaced by former Notre Dame head coach Charlie Weis.

New Coaching Staff
Name	Position	Previous Position
Charlie Weis	Head Coach / offensive coordinator	Florida (OC)
Dave Campo	Defensive coordinator/defensive backs	Dallas Cowboys (DB)
Clint Bowen	Special Teams/defensive backs	North Texas (DC)
Jeff Blasko	Assistant Special Teams coordinator/tight ends coach	Florida (GA)
Rob Ianello	Recruiting coordinator/ wide receivers coach	Akron (HC)
Buddy Wyatt	Defensive line	(returning)
DeMontie Cross	Linebackers	Wisconsin (DB)
Ron Powlus	Quarterbacks Coach	Akron (QB)
Reggie Mitchell	Running backs	(returning)
Tim Grunhard	Offensive line coach	Bishop Miege High School (HC)
Scott Holsopple	Strength and conditioning	Florida (asst. S&C)

=== Recruiting ===
Following the hire of Charlie Weis, the Jayhawks received a pair of high-profile quarterback transfers in the duo of Dayne Crist from Notre Dame and Jake Heaps from BYU. Crist will be eligible for the 2012 season while Heaps will be eligible for the 2013-2014 seasons.

== Roster ==
2012 Kansas Jayhawks football roster
(Starters in bold)
**Quarterbacks**: 6 Turner Baty – So.; 9 Jake Heaps – (redshirt); 10 **Dayne Crist** – Sr. (5th yr TR); 14 Michael Cummings – (redshirt) Fr.; 17 Blake Jablonski – (redshirt) So.; **Running backs**: 3 Tony Pierson – So.; 25 Brandon Bourbon – (redshirt) So.; 28 Marquis Jackson – So.; 29 **James Sims** – Jr.; 36 Taylor Cox – Jr.; 37 Ryan Burton – (redshirt) Jr.; 40 Preston Randall – Fr.; **Fullbacks**: 28 Marquis Jackson – So.; 43 Ed Fink – (redshirt) So.; 45 Nick Sizemore – (redshirt) Sr.; 85 **Trent Smiley** – (redshirt) So.; **Wide receivers**: 7 **Kale Pick** – (redshirt) Sr.; 8 Josh Ford – Jr.; 11 Tre' Parmalee – Fr.; 12 Christian Matthews – (redshirt) Jr.; 15 **Daymond Patterson** – (redshirt) Sr.; 16 Matt Hentges – Fr.; 19 Justin McCay – (redshirt); 20 D.J. Beshears – Sr.; 22 Connor Embree – (redshirt) So.; 80 Ricki Herod – (redshirt) So.; 82 **Andrew Turzilli** – (redshirt) So.; 83 Chris Omigie – (redshirt) Jr.; 88 Billy Owens – Jr.; **Tight ends**: 38 Justin Puthoff – (redshirt) Jr.; 41 Jimmay Mundine – (redshirt) So.; 46 Adam Novak – Fr.; 84 **Mike Ragone** – (redshirt) Sr. (5th yr TR); 85 Trent Smiley – (redshirt) So.; 86 Charles Brooks – Jr.; 87 Jordan Shelley-Smith – Fr.	**Offensive line**: 56 Josh Burgoon – (redshirt) Jr.; 61 Pat Lewandowski – (redshirt) So.; 63 Dillon Roberts – Jr.; 64 **Randall Dent** – (redshirt) Jr.; 66 Dylan Admire – (redshirt) Fr.; 67 **Duane Zlatnik** – (redshirt) Sr.; 68 Luke Luhrsen – (redshirt) Fr.; 69 **Trevor Marrongelli** – (redshirt) Sr.; 70 Gavin Howard – (redshirt) Jr.; 72 **Tanner Hawkinson** – (redshirt) Sr.; 73 Damon Martin – (redshirt) Fr.; 74 Brian Beckmann – Fr.; 75 Sean Connolly – Fr.; 76 Bryan Peters – (redshirt) Fr.; 77 **Aslam Sterling** – Jr.; 78 Alex Beglinger – Jr.; 79 Riley Spencer – (redshirt) Jr.; **Defensive line**: 9 **Jordan Tavai** – Jr.; 35 **Toben Opurum** – Sr.; 38 Josh Richardson – (redshirt) Sr.; 62 Dylan Avery – (redshirt) So.; 71 John Williams – (redshirt) Sr.; 90 Kevin Young – (redshirt) Jr.; 91 Shane Smith – (redshirt) Jr.; 92 Neal Page – Fr.; 93 Ben Goodman – (redshirt) Fr.; 94 Tyler Holmes – Fr.; 95 **Josh Williams** – (redshirt) Sr. (5th year TR); 96 **Keba Agostinho** – Jr.; 97 Ty McKinney – Jr.; 98 Keon Stowers – So.; 99 Peter Gallo – Fr.	**Linebackers**: 2 Darius Willis – (redshirt) Jr.; 4 Prinz Kande – (redshirt) Jr.; 17 **Tunde Bakare** – Sr.; 31 **Ben Heeney** – So.; 32 Schyler Miles – Fr.; 34 **Huldon Tharp** – (redshirt) Jr.; 51 Anthony McDonald – (redshirt) Sr. (5th year TR); 52 Dom Bickus – Fr.; 53 Ryan Karlin – (redshirt) Fr.; 55 Michael Reynolds – So.; 57 Jake Love – (redshirt) Fr.; 58 Courtney Arnick – Fr.; **Cornerbacks**: 5 **Greg Brown** – (redshirt) Sr.; 11 Tyree Williams – Fr.; 14 Nasir Moore – Jr.; 18 Corrigan Powell – (redshirt) Sr.; 22 Greg Allen – Fr.; 23 Dexter Linton – (redshirt) Jr.; 25 JaCorey Shepherd – So.; 33 **Tyler Patmon** – (redshirt) Jr.; 37 Jackson Long – Fr.; 45 Piers Christian – Fr.; **Safeties**: 1 **Lubbock Smith** – (redshirt) Sr.; 23 Dexter Linton – (redshirt) Jr.; 24 **Bradley McDougald** – Sr.; 26 Ray Mitchell – (redshirt) So.'; 27 Victor Simmons – So.; 28 Brandon Hawks – (redshirt) Sr.; 30 Tevin Shaw – Fr.; 43 Alex Matlock – (redshirt) Fr.; 47 Brian Maura – (redshirt) So.; **Special teams**: 13 **Ron Doherty** – Jr. (K/P); 16 Nick Prolago – So. (K); 19 Eric Kahn – So. (K); 38 Justin Puthoff – (redshirt) Jr. (LS); 40 Sean Huddleston – So. (P); 54 Justin Carnes – (redshirt) Jr. (LS); 59 Reilly Jeffers – Fr. (LS); 65 Paul Clark – Fr. (LS); 99 Austin Barone – Fr. (K)

== Schedule ==
Date	Time	Opponent	Site	TV	Result	Attendance
September 1	6:00 p.m.	South Dakota State*	Memorial Stadium; Lawrence, KS	Jayhawk TV	W 31–17	46,601
September 8	2:30 p.m.	Rice*	Memorial Stadium; Lawrence, KS	FSN	L 24–25	44,683
September 15	11:00 a.m.	No. 16 TCU	Memorial Stadium; Lawrence, KS	FX	L 6–20	43,867
September 22	2:30 p.m.	at Northern Illinois*	Huskie Stadium; DeKalb, IL	ESPN3	L 23–30	18,374
October 6	11:00 a.m.	at No. 7 Kansas State	Bill Snyder Family Football Stadium; Manhattan, KS (Sunflower Showdown)	FX	L 16–56	50,344
October 13	2:30 p.m.	Oklahoma State	Memorial Stadium; Lawrence, KS	FSN	L 14–20	31,115
October 20	6:00 p.m.	at No. 10 Oklahoma	Gaylord Family Oklahoma Memorial Stadium; Norman, OK	FSN	L 7–52	84,532
October 27	11:00 a.m.	Texas^{†}	Memorial Stadium; Lawrence, KS	FSN	L 17–21	40,097
November 3	2:30 p.m.	at Baylor	Floyd Casey Stadium; Waco, TX	FSN	L 14–41	39,039
November 10	11:00 a.m.	at No. 25 Texas Tech	Jones AT&T Stadium; Lubbock, TX	FSN	L 34–41 ^{2OT}	55,052
November 17	6:00 p.m.	Iowa State	Memorial Stadium; Lawrence, KS	FSN	L 23–51	41,608
December 1	1:30 p.m.	at West Virginia	Mountaineer Field; Morgantown, WV	FSN	L 10–59	51,112
*Non-conference game; ^{†}Homecoming; Rankings from AP Poll released prior to the game; All times are in Central time
