= 2012 TCU Horned Frogs football team =

American college football season

2012 TCU Horned Frogs football

Buffalo Wild Wings Bowl, L 16–17 vs. Michigan State
- Conference: Big 12 Conference
- Record: 7–6 (4–5 Big 12)
- Head coach: Gary Patterson (12th season)
- Co-offensive coordinators: Jarrett Anderson (4th season); Rusty Burns (1st season)
- Offensive scheme: Spread
- Defensive coordinator: Dick Bumpas (9th season)
- Base defense: 4–2–5
- Home stadium: Amon G. Carter Stadium

2012 Big 12 Conference football standings
	Conf.			Overall
Team	W		L	W		L
No. 12 Kansas State $+	8	–	1	11	–	2
No. 15 Oklahoma +	8	–	1	10	–	3
No. 19 Texas	5	–	4	9	–	4
Oklahoma State	5	–	4	8	–	5
Baylor	4	–	5	8	–	5
TCU	4	–	5	7	–	6
Texas Tech	4	–	5	8	–	5
West Virginia	4	–	5	7	–	6
Iowa State	3	–	6	6	–	7
Kansas	0	–	9	1	–	11
$ – BCS representative as conference champion; + – Conference co-champions; Rankings from AP Poll

The 2012 TCU Horned Frogs football team represented Texas Christian University in the 2012 NCAA Division I FBS football season. The Horned Frogs were led by 12th-year head coach Gary Patterson and played their home games at Amon G. Carter Stadium. This was their first year as members of the Big 12 Conference. They finished the season 7–6, 4–5 in Big 12 play to finish in a four way tie for fifth place. They were invited to the Buffalo Wild Wings Bowl where they were defeated by Michigan State.

With their win of a regular season game on September 8, Gary Patterson became the winningest coach in the history of the Horned Frogs' program.

== Schedule ==
Date	Time	Opponent	Rank	Site	TV	Result	Attendance
September 8	6:00 p.m.	Grambling State*	No. 20	Amon G. Carter Stadium; Fort Worth, TX	FSSW+/FCS Pacific	W 56–0	45,112
September 15	11:00 a.m.	at Kansas	No. 16	Memorial Stadium; Lawrence, KS	FX	W 20–6	43,867
September 22	11:00 a.m.	Virginia*	No. 17	Amon G. Carter Stadium; Fort Worth, TX	ESPN	W 27–7	46,330
September 29	6:00 p.m.	at SMU*	No. 15	Gerald J. Ford Stadium; University Park, TX (Battle for the Iron Skillet)	FSN	W 24–16	28,436
October 6	2:30 p.m.	Iowa State	No. 15	Amon G. Carter Stadium; Fort Worth, TX	FSN	L 23–37	42,152
October 13	6:00 p.m.	at Baylor		Floyd Casey Stadium; Waco, TX (rivalry)	FSN	W 49–21	42,524
October 20	2:30 p.m.	No. 18 Texas Tech^{†}		Amon G. Carter Stadium; Fort Worth, TX (The West Texas Championship)	ABC/ESPN2	L 53–56 ^{3OT}	47,894
October 27	2:30 p.m.	at Oklahoma State		Boone Pickens Stadium; Stillwater, OK	FSN	L 14–36	57,183
November 3	2:00 p.m.	at No. 23 West Virginia		Mountaineer Field; Morgantown, WV	FOX	W 39–38 ^{2OT}	52,322
November 10	6:00 p.m.	No. 3 Kansas State		Amon G. Carter Stadium; Fort Worth, TX	FOX	L 10–23	47,292
November 22	6:30 p.m.	at No. 18 Texas		Darrell K Royal–Texas Memorial Stadium; Austin, TX (rivalry)	ESPN	W 20–13	99,950
December 1	11:00 a.m.	No. 12 Oklahoma		Amon G. Carter Stadium; Fort Worth, TX	ESPN	L 17–24	47,501
December 29	9:15 p.m.	vs. Michigan State*		Sun Devil Stadium; Tempe, AZ (Buffalo Wild Wings Bowl)	ESPN	L 16–17	44,617
*Non-conference game; ^{†}Homecoming; Rankings from AP Poll released prior to the game; All times are in Central time

== Rankings ==
Ranking movements Legend: ██ Increase in ranking ██ Decrease in ranking — = Not ranked RV = Received votes
	Week															
Poll	Pre	1	2	3	4	5	6	7	8	9	10	11	12	13	14	Final
AP	20	20	16	17	15	15	RV	RV	RV	—	RV	RV	RV	RV	RV	
Coaches	17	17	15	16	14	13	23	21	RV	—	RV	—	—	RV	RV	
Harris	Not released						21	22	RV	—	RV	RV	RV	RV	RV	Not released
BCS	Not released							23	—	—	—	—	—	—	—	Not released

== Coaching staff ==
Name	Position	Year at TCU	Alma mater
Gary Patterson	Head coach	12th	Kansas State (1983)
Jarrett Anderson	Co-Offensive Coordinator/running backs	15th	New Mexico (1993)
Dick Bumpas	Defensive coordinator/defensive line	9th	Arkansas (1973)
Rusty Burns	Co-Offensive Coordinator/quarterbacks	4th	Springfield College (1978)
Chad Glasgow	Safeties	11th	Oklahoma State (1995)
Trey Haverty	Wide receivers	2nd	Texas Tech (2004)
Clay Jennings	Cornerbacks	5th	North Texas (1996)
Ryan McInerney	Graduate Assistant - Defense	2nd	Pittsburg State (2008)
Randy Shannon	Linebackers	1st	Miami (FL) (1988)
Dan Sharp	Tight ends/special teams	12th	TCU (1985)
Eddie Williamson	Assistant head coach/offensive line	12th	Davidson (1973)
Kyle Skierski	Graduate Assistant - Offense	1st	UC Davis (2006)
