= Chris Thomsen =

American football player and coach (born 1968)

Current position
- Title: Deputy head coach & tight ends coach
- Team: Florida State
- Conference: ACC

Biographical details
- Born: November 7, 1968 (age 57); Vernon, Texas, U.S.

Playing career
- 1988–1990: TCU
- 1991–1993: Abilene Christian
- Position: Tight end

Coaching career (HC unless noted)
- 1994–1999: Abilene Christian (assistant)
- 2001–2002: Wichita Falls HS (TX) (OC)
- 2003–2004: Central Arkansas (OL)
- 2005–2011: Abilene Christian
- 2012: Texas Tech (interim HC/OL)
- 2013–2016: Arizona State (OL)
- 2017–2019: TCU (OL)
- 2020–present: Florida State (DHC/TE)

Head coaching record
- Overall: 52–21 (10 wins vacated) (Note: 10 games, including 8 conference games, and 1 post-season game, were vacated by the NCAA for violations.)
- Bowls: 1–0
- Tournaments: 2–5 (1 win vacated)

Accomplishments and honors

Championships
- 2 Lone Star (2008, 2010)

Awards
- LSC South Division Coach of the Year (2006)

Chris Thomsen (born November 7, 1968) is an American college football coach. He is the deputy head coach and tight ends coach for Florida State University, since 2020. Thomsen was the head coach of the Wildcats football program at Abilene Christian University (ACU), from 2005 through 2011. Thomsen also served as the interim head football coach at Texas Tech University for one game in 2012, the Meineke Car Care Bowl of Texas.

== Coaching career ==
=== Early years ===
Thomsen is a 1993 ACU graduate and a former Wildcats tight end. Following his graduation, he remained at ACU, first as a graduate assistant and then working his way up to offensive line coach, recruiting coordinator, offensive coordinator, and, finally, assistant head coach. In 1998, the Wildcats finished 18th in the nation in passing under the direction of Thomsen, who was the offensive coordinator.

Prior to transferring to ACU, Thomsen played football three seasons (1988–90) and baseball one season (All-America and All-Southwest Conference with 21 home runs and a .373 batting average) at TCU before being selected in the 17th round of the Major League Baseball Amateur Draft by the Oakland Athletics. Thomsen went on to play for two seasons in Oakland's minor league system.

In the 1991 season, Thomsen became the only TCU player in program history to hit for a home run cycle in a March 1, 1991, doubleheader against Northeast Louisiana (now UL Monroe). In the first game, he had an inside-the-park home run, a three-run home run and a two-run home run. In the second game he had another solo home run and a grand slam. He was 5-for-7 with five homers and 11 RBI in the doubleheader.

He went on to earn first team All-SWC and All-America honors and was also a member of the SWC Postseason Baseball Championship All-Tournament team. He was voted the TCU Male Athlete of the Year in 1991. He earned a Bachelor of Science in criminal justice from TCU in December 1993 and received his master's in secondary education from ACU in 2000.

In 1999, Thomsen left ACU to go into private business, but eventually returned to coaching as he became offensive coordinator at Wichita Falls High School in 2001. With Thomsen calling the plays, the Coyotes won back-to-back district titles and led the district in scoring both seasons (34 points per game in 2001 and 42 ppg in 2002). In 2002 they set the school's single-season record for most points in a season, and the quarterback set the school's single-season record for touchdown passes. Following his tenure at Wichita Falls High School, Thomsen served a two-year stint as offensive line coach at the University of Central Arkansas.

=== Abilene Christian ===
In 2005, Thomsen returned to his alma mater, succeeding Gary Gaines as the ACU Wildcats head coach. In 2006, he led the Wildcats to an 8–3 record and the program's first berth in the NCAA Division II playoffs. He was named the Lone Star Conference South Division Coach of the Year.

In 2008, Abilene Christian finished the regular season undefeated for the first time since 1950. In the NCAA Division II Playoff second round the Wildcats knocked off rival West Texas A&M University 93–68, the 93 points an NCAA playoff record. In December 2008, Thomsen applied for the vacant head coaching position at Northwestern State University and was named among the six finalists. Other finalists included Bradley Dale Peveto, co-defensive coordinator at Louisiana State University and a former Northwestern State assistant, who eventually got the job.

In 2011, Thomsen left ACU for an assistant position at Arizona State but left before the beginning of the 2012 season.

=== Texas Tech ===
On February 3, 2012, it was announced that Thomsen would be leaving his position at Arizona State to accept the position of offensive line coach for the Texas Tech Red Raiders On December 8, 2012, Red Raiders head coach Tommy Tuberville resigned to take the same position with the Cincinnati Bearcats football program, and two days later Thomsen was named interim head coach replacing Tuberville. Thomsen lead the team to a victory in the 2012 Meineke Car Care Bowl of Texas against Minnesota.

=== Arizona State ===
Following the bowl victory, Arizona State hired Thomsen once more to be their running backs coach. As of March 19, 2013 Thomsen was moved to offensive line coach for the Sun Devils. Also on the staff was offensive coordinator Mike Norvell, who had played at Central Arkansas during Thomsen's tenure there. After the 2016 season Thomsen departed Arizona State to become the offensive line coach at Texas Christian University under Gary Patterson.

=== TCU ===
Thomsen coached the offensive line at TCU for three seasons.

=== Florida State ===
At the end of the 2019 season he left TCU to be reunited with Norvell, the new head coach at Florida State University. Norvell named him tight ends coach and deputy head coach. Thomsen served as acting head coach for a single game after Norvell tested positive for the coronavirus.

== Head coaching record ==
Year	Team	Overall	Conference	Standing	Bowl/playoffs
Abilene Christian Wildcats (Lone Star Conference) (2005–2011)
2005	Abilene Christian	4–6	4–5	T–8th	
2006	Abilene Christian	8–3	7–2	T–2nd	L NCAA Division II First Round
2007	Abilene Christian	0–3 (10–3)	0–1 (8–1)	6th (2nd (South))	L NCAA Division II Second Round
2008	Abilene Christian	11–1	9–0	1st (South)	L NCAA Division II Quarterfinal
2009	Abilene Christian	9–4	6–3	T–5th (South)	L NCAA Division II Second Round
2010	Abilene Christian	11–1	10–0	1st (South)	L NCAA Division II Second Round
2011	Abilene Christian	8–3	7–1	2nd	L NCAA Division II First Round
Abilene Christian:		51–21 (61–21)	43–12 (51–12)		
Texas Tech Red Raiders (Big 12 Conference) (2012)
2012	Texas Tech	1–0 (Note: Thomsen coached the 2012 Meineke Car Care Bowl of Texas after head coach Tommy Tuberville resigned after a 7–5 (4–5 Big 12) regular season.)			W Meineke Car Care Bowl of Texas
Texas Tech:		1–0			
Total:		52–21 (61–21)			
National championship Conference title Conference division title or championship game berth
