= 2012 Meineke Car Care Bowl of Texas =

Minnesota Golden Gophers	Texas Tech Red Raiders
(6–6)	(7–5)
Big Ten	Big 12
31	34
Head coach: Jerry Kill	Head coach: Chris Thomsen
	1	2	3	4	Total
Minnesota	10	7	7	7	31
Texas Tech	14	10	0	10	34
- Date: December 28, 2012
- Season: 2012
- Stadium: Reliant Stadium
- Location: Houston, Texas
- Favorite: Texas Tech by 13½
- Referee: Tom McCabe (MAC)
- Attendance: 50,386

United States TV coverage
- Network: ESPN
- Announcers: Mark Jones, Brock Huard

The 2012 Meineke Car Care Bowl of Texas, the seventh edition of the game, was a post-season American college football bowl game held on December 28, 2012 at Reliant Stadium in Houston, Texas as part of the 2012-13 NCAA football bowl season. The game, which was the final game of the 2012 NCAA Division I FBS football season for both teams, was broadcast at 8 p.m. CT on ESPN, and featured the Minnesota Golden Gophers from the Big Ten Conference against the Texas Tech Red Raiders from the Big 12 Conference. The Golden Gophers accepted their invitation after finishing the regular season at six-wins, six-losses, while the Red Raiders accepted their invitation following a campaign during which they totaled seven-wins, five-losses. This was not the first time the Golden Gophers and Red Raiders met in a bowl game; the two teams had previously met in the 2006 Insight Bowl, with the Red Raiders winning 44–41 in overtime.

== Teams ==
=== Minnesota ===
The Golden Gophers finished at the bottom of the Big Ten's Legends Division, only posting a 2–6 mark in conference play. However, because of their 6–6 record, the Golden Gophers were bowl eligible for the first time since 2009, accepting a bid to the Meineke Car Care Bowl of Texas their bid to the game, their first Meineke Car Care Bowl appearance.

=== Texas Tech ===
The Red Raiders finished in a tie for fifth place in the Big 12 at 4–5 in conference play, holding tiebreakers ahead of the TCU Horned Frogs and West Virginia Mountaineers but behind the Baylor Bears. Soon after Minnesota accepted their invitation, the Red Raiders did the same. Although this was also the Red Raiders' first appearance in the Meineke Car Care Bowl of Texas, the Red Raiders played in three previous bowl games in Houston: the 1976 Bluebonnet Bowl, the 2000 Galleryfurniture.com Bowl, and the 2003 Houston Bowl.

The Red Raiders' passing attack was the second-best in the country, averaging 362 yards per game.

== Game summary ==
=== Scoring summary ===
Scoring summary

Quarter	Time	Drive			Team	Scoring information	Score	
Quarter	Time	Plays	Yards	TOP	Team	Scoring information	Minnesota	Texas Tech
1	8:31	12	50	6:29	Minnesota	41-yard field goal by Jordan Wettstein	3	0
1	8:17	-	-	-	TTU	99 yard kickoff return by Jakeem Grant, Ryan Bustin kick good	3	7
1	5:46	6	67	2:31	Minnesota	Rodrick Williams Jr 2-yard touchdown run, Jordan Wettstein kick good	10	7
1	4:01	6	75	1:45	TTU	Derreck Edwards 13-yard touchdown reception from Michael Brewer, Ryan Bustin kick good	10	14
2	14:26	9	48	4:35	Minnesota	Donnell Kirkwood 3-yard touchdown run, Jordan Wettstein kick good	17	14
2	8:36	14	64	5:50	TTU	28-yard field goal by Ryan Bustin	17	17
2	0:05	12	42	2:22	TTU	Seth Doege 4-yard touchdown run, Ryan Bustin kick good	17	24
3	12:07	6	53	2:01	Minnesota	Devin Crawford-Tufts 17-yard touchdown reception from Phillip Nelson, Jordan Wettstein kick good	24	24
4	13:07	8	79	3:17	Minnesota	Drew Goodger 1-yard touchdown reception from Phillip Nelson, Jordan Wettstein kick good	31	24
4	1:10	7	82	2:14	TTU	Eric Ward 35-yard touchdown reception from Seth Doege, Ryan Bustin kick good	31	31
4	0:00	3	11	0:43	TTU	28-yard field goal by Ryan Bustin	31	34
"TOP" = time of possession. For other American football terms, see Glossary of American football.							31	34

=== Statistics ===
Statistics	MINN	TTU
First downs	23	23
Plays–yards	73–368	71–429
Rushes–yards	54–222	24–145
Passing yards	146	284
Passing: Comp–Att–Int	8–19–1	32–47–2
Time of possession	36:18	23:04
