= Mike Gleason (announcer) =

American sports announcer

Mike Gleason is an ESPN anchor, who appears primarily on ESPNU and ESPN Classic.

== Education ==
Gleason obtained his Bachelor of Science degree in broadcasting/communications in 1978 from Northern Michigan University.

== Career ==
Before joining ESPN, Gleason worked for WBNS-AM in Columbus, Ohio, from 1994 to 1996 as a show host and doing play-by-play. He also worked at WBNS-TV in Columbus from 1987 to 1998 as an anchor and handling a variety of play-by-play assignments.

Gleason is currently responsible for handling Big East football and basketball for ESPN Regional Television. He also in charge of the Home Depot College Football Awards, Bell Helicopter Armed Forces Bowl, and the NBA Pre-Draft Combine. Occasionally, Gleason calls college football, basketball, and men's gymnastic championships for ESPN.
