= Chad Glasgow =

American football player and coach (born 1972)

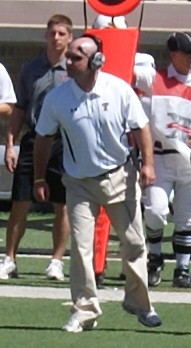
- Chad Glasgow preparing to coach the Red Raiders

Biographical details
- Born: January 18, 1972 (age 54)

Playing career
- 1991–1993: Oklahoma St.
- Position: Linebacker

Coaching career (HC unless noted)
- 1994–1995: Oklahoma State (GA)
- 1996: New Mexico (GA)
- 1997: Illinois State (LB)
- 1998–2000: Southwest Texas St. (S)
- 2001–2010: TCU (S)
- 2011: Texas Tech (DC)
- 2012-2014: TCU (S)
- 2015: TCU (Co-DC/S)
- 2016–2021: TCU (DC/S)

Chad Glasgow (born January 18, 1972) is a football coach who was the defensive coordinator for the TCU Horned Frogs for six seasons and former Texas Tech Red Raiders football program's defensive coordinator for the 2011 season.

== Early years ==
Glasgow graduated from Woodward High School in Woodward, Oklahoma. In 1995, he received a Bachelor of Business Administration (BBA) from Oklahoma State University (OSU) in 1995. Glasgow also played linebacker for the Oklahoma State Cowboys.

== Early coaching career ==
Glasgow began his coaching career as a graduate assistant at the Oklahoma State University from 1994-95. The following year, he served in the same position at the University of New Mexico under head coach Dennis Franchione. While with the New Mexico Lobos, Glasgow also served under then defensive coordinator, Gary Patterson. Glasgow was named the linebackers coach at Illinois State University for the 1997 season. From 1998–2000, Glasgow was the safeties coach at Southwest Texas State University (now Texas State University–San Marcos). In 2001, Glasgow was hired as the safeties coach at Texas Christian University, by first year Horned Frogs head coach Gary Patterson. After the 2010 season, Glasgow was named the National Defensive Backs Coach of the Year winner by Footballscoop.com.

== Texas Tech ==
Prior to the 2011 season, Glasgow was named defensive coordinator at Texas Tech University after James Willis was relieved of his duties the previous month. Glasgow looked to bring a transformation to a Texas Tech defense that ranked dead last in the Big 12 and 116th in the country. In a February 2, 2011, National Signing Day show shown on FOX34, in Lubbock, Glasgow announced that Texas Tech would be scrapping the 3–4 scheme they ran under Willis and will replace that with the 4–2–5 defense that Glasgow ran at TCU. On December 29, 2011, following a season in which the Red Raiders were ranked 117th in points allowed per game, it was announced that Chad Glasgow would be leaving the Texas Tech staff. Later Glasgow and Texas Tech agreed to mutually split with Tech and Glasgow agreeing to a settlement of $100,000.

== TCU ==
In 2016, Gary Patterson, promoted Glasgow to full-time defensive coordinator and Safeties coach.

== Personal life ==
Glasgow and his wife, Maida, were married in March 2010. The couple has twin boys, Brance and Colt and has a one-year-old boy named Dayne.
