= Texas A&M Aggies football under Mike Sherman =

American college football team, 2007–2011

Mike Sherman was the 28th head coach for the Texas A&M Aggies football team, which represents Texas A&M University in NCAA Division I FBS college football. He was the head coach since his appointment in November 2007 until being fired December 1, 2011. Sherman replaced Dennis Franchione.

== Arrival ==
=== Hiring ===
During his stint with the Houston Texans, Sherman was informed by his agent that there would be an NFL head coaching job had he waited another few years. However, when offered the Texas A&M head coaching job, which had been vacated by Dennis Franchione, Sherman did not hesitate to accept it. Sherman stated, "[I accepted in] as much time as it takes to say yes. I didn't have to think about this. This is where I want to be, where I want to live my life. I raised my kids here when they were young. This is kind-of going full circle. I've been there, done that at other places and I want to be able to do something special here at College Station with Texas A&M." On November 26, 2007, three days after Franchione resigned, Sherman was officially announced as the 28th head coach of the Texas A&M football program. Athletic director Bill Byrne contacted Sherman after the Aggies' final regular season matchup over Texas on Friday, November 23, and hired him after the Houston Texans game on Sunday, November 25.

The only coaching candidate interviewed for the job, Sherman signed a seven-year contract worth $1.8 million annually. The entire $12.6 million contract is guaranteed. Sherman requested that he would rather not be paid the $2 million/year that Franchione was making, insisting that he "would rather take less and go out and hire the best coordinators and coaches". Former Aggie NFL players Richmond Webb, Hunter Goodwin, and Bucky Richardson, as well as former A&M coaches R. C. Slocum and Jackie Sherrill, stated their approval of Sherman's hire. Additionally, the interim president of the university at the time, Dr. Ed Davis, and the Texas A&M Board of Regents, including former A&M coach Gene Stallings, approved as well. Former Green Bay quarterback Brett Favre and Indianapolis Colts head coach Tony Dungy have also supported the hire and expected Sherman to do a great job at A&M.

=== Assistant coach appointments ===
Sherman chose to finish his term with the Houston Texans before working full-time as the Aggies' head coach. The Texans ended their regular season on December 30, 2007. While serving both roles, Sherman contacted A&M's verbally committed recruits by telephone, and hired former Nebraska recruiting coordinator Tim Cassidy—who had been the recruiting coordinator at A&M from 1989–2004—to serve as the recruiting coordinator as well as the associate athletic director for football. Once Sherman started his job full-time, he named Seattle Seahawks wide receivers coach Nolan Cromwell to be his offensive coordinator and former Arkansas Razorbacks coach Reggie Herring to be his defensive coordinator. Herring, however, resigned in February 2008 after National Signing Day to become the linebackers coach for the Dallas Cowboys. Sherman worked with Cromwell under head coach Mike Holmgren at Green Bay. Sherman assigned Cromwell to call the plays, and indicated that he will have veto power when necessary.

On January 9, 2008, Sherman announced Buddy Wyatt would coach the defensive line. At the time of his hiring, Wyatt had 18 years of collegiate coaching experience, including 3 seasons as a defensive line coach at A&M from 2000–02. Sherman also retained defensive backs coach Van Malone, who coached under Franchione for the 2006–07 seasons. Malone was the only member from Franchione's staff to be retained. Former Boston College offensive line coach Jim Turner, as well as former NFL running back Randy Jordan, were selected to coach the offensive line and running backs, respectively. On January 28, 2008, Sherman named former Packers coach Tom Rossley as the quarterbacks coach. On February 13, 2008, Sherman hired former Alabama defensive coordinator Joe Kines to replace Herring. Kines' defensive squads at Alabama ranked second in the nation in 2004 and 2005, and 23rd in 2006. Two days later, former Denver Broncos coach Kirk Doll, another former A&M coach (from 1988–93), was hired to be the tight ends and special teams coach.

== Seasons ==
=== 2008 season ===
==== Preseason ====
Sherman was able to retain most of Franchione's recruits for the 2008 season.

Sherman emphasized improving the team's speed, particularly on defense. He also stated that a run-oriented offense, which former head coach Dennis Franchione emphasized, is antiquated, and improving the speed on offense is crucial in matching the speed of current successful college teams. He made player adjustments to fit his pro-style offensive scheme.

In April 2008, a Sporting News writer ranked Sherman 8th among all Big 12 coaches, above first-year Nebraska coach Bo Pelini, Oklahoma State's Mike Gundy, Iowa State's Gene Chizik, and Kansas State's Ron Prince, who ranked 9th, 10th, 11th and 12th, respectively. The same writer ranked Sherman 46th among all the BCS 66 coaches.

Upon the completion of the spring practices, players had described Sherman as "no-nonsense and all business". Sherman held ten 6:00 a.m. meetings prior to spring training, and continued to hold meetings at the same time on the days of spring practice. According to Sherman, the meetings featured "40 minutes of chaos. Drills, drills, drills, running, with coaches on their butts." Players who were late to the meetings were asked to jog an unspecified distance as a form of punishment. In fact, Sherman stressed that "being on time is a matter of respect", a lesson he believes that young people should be taught early. He even placed 25 digital clocks throughout the Bright Football Complex—the facility that houses the locker room, player's lounge, and coaches' offices, among others—so that players can be certain they manage their time well. None of the players missed the workouts, except three who had a medical excuse.

==== Regular season ====
In his first season, Sherman compiled a 4–8 record. The season included losses to Arkansas State and historic rival Baylor, as well as a lopsided 49–9 loss to Texas. ESPN's Mark Schlabach listed him as having the worst first season in 2008. After the season, Sherman showed confidence about the future seasons.

=== 2009 season ===
Sherman led the 2009 team to a 6–7 record. Highlights of the season included a victory over #24 Texas Tech. The season, however, included four blowout losses, including the one to Georgia in the Independence Bowl.

=== 2010 season ===
Following the 2009 season, Sherman hired Tim DeRuyter to defensive coordinator, to replace the retired Joe Kines. He also hired Troy Walters to coach wide receivers, Dat Nguyen to coach inside linebackers, Nick Toth to coach outside linebackers, and Terrell Williams to coach the defensive line. Coaches who left the team include offensive coordinator Nolan Cromwell, special teams coach Kirk Doll, defensive line coach Buddy Wyatt, and safety coach Van Malone.

In January 2010, Sherman convinced All-American Von Miller to bypass the 2010 NFL draft and stay for his senior year.

The team started off 3–3. During practice after the loss to Missouri, Sherman put the game's film and play books in a barrel and burned it. In the ensuing Kansas game, Sherman made receiver Ryan Tannehill and longtime starter Jerrod Johnson split time at quarterback. Sherman replaced Johnson with Tannehill for the Texas Tech game. Under Tannehill's leadership, the Aggies compiled a 5–0 streak, which included wins over Oklahoma, Nebraska, and Texas. The Aggies finished the regular season 9–3, with #17/18 rankings in the AP/Coaches poll, respectively. They also won a share of the Big 12 South Division title.

== Coaching record ==
Year	Team	Overall	Conference	Standing	Bowl/playoffs	Coaches^{#}	AP^{°}
Texas A&M Aggies (Big 12 Conference) (2008–present)
2008	Texas A&M	4–8	2–6	T–5th (South)		—	—
2009	Texas A&M	6–7	3–5	5th (South)	L Independence	—	—
2010	Texas A&M	9–4	6–2	T–1st (South)	L Cotton	21	19
2011	Texas A&M	6–6	4–5	T–6th (South)		—	—
Texas A&M:		25–25	15–18				
Total:		25–25					
National championship Conference title Conference division title or championship game berth
^{#}Rankings from final Coaches Poll.; ^{°}Rankings from final AP Poll.

== See also ==
- Texas A&M Aggies football
