= A. J. Green =

American football player (born 1988)

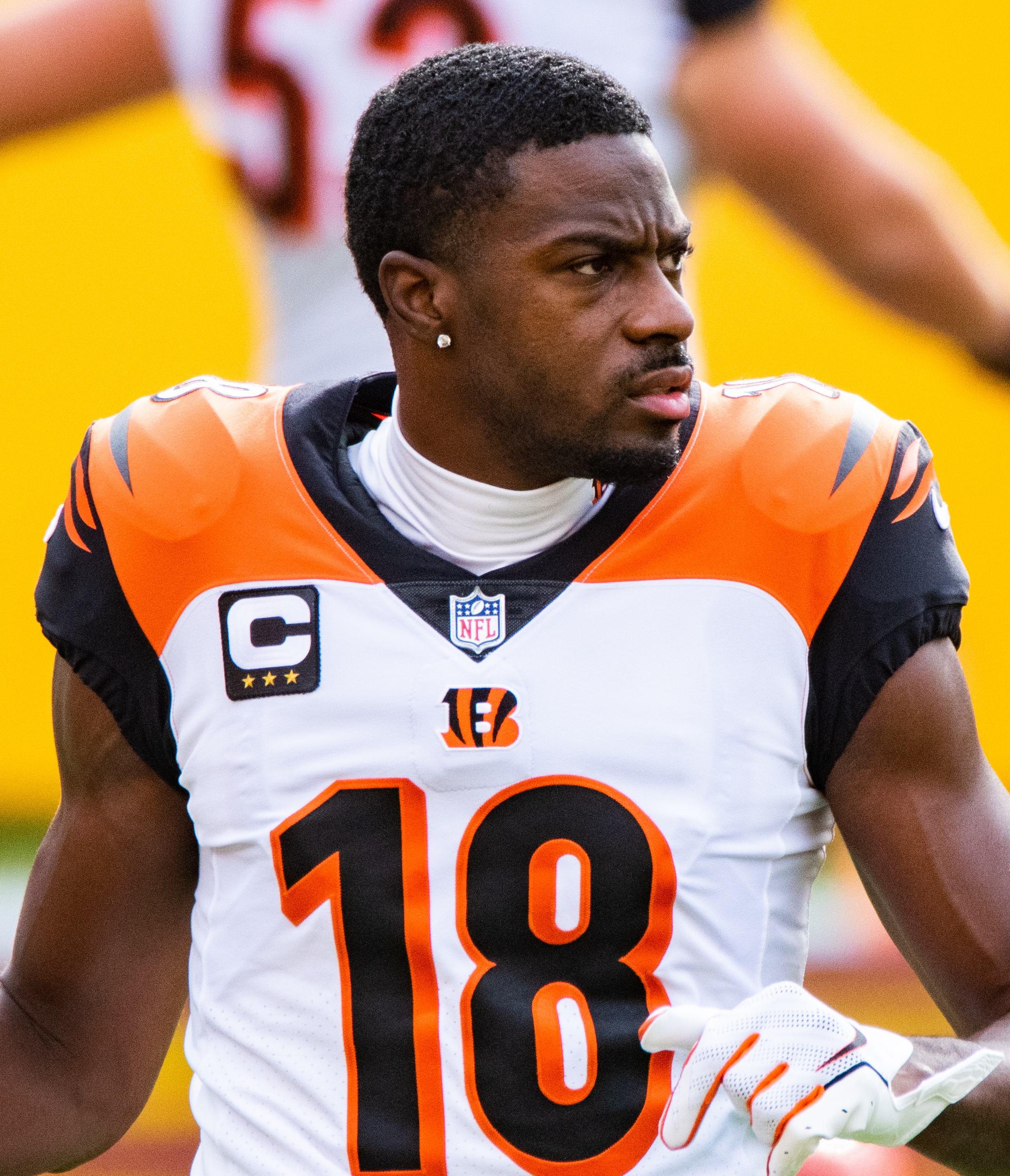
- Green with the Cincinnati Bengals in 2020

No. 18
- Position: Wide receiver

Personal information
- Born: July 31, 1988 (age 38); Summerville, South Carolina, U.S.
- Listed height: 6 ft 4 in (1.93 m)
- Listed weight: 207 lb (94 kg)

Career information
- High school: Summerville
- College: Georgia (2008–2010)
- NFL draft: 2011: 1st round, 4th overall pick

Career history
- Cincinnati Bengals (2011–2020); Arizona Cardinals (2021–2022)

Awards and highlights
- 2× Second-team All-Pro (2012, 2013); 7× Pro Bowl (2011–2017); PFWA NFL All-Rookie Team (2011); 2× First-team All-American (2009, 2010); 2× First-team All-SEC (2008, 2009); Second-team All-SEC (2010); SEC Freshman of the Year (2008)

Career NFL statistics
- Receptions: 727
- Receiving yards: 10,514
- Receiving touchdowns: 70
- Stats at Pro Football Reference

Adriel Jeremiah "A. J." Green (born July 31, 1988) is an American former professional football wide receiver who played in the National Football League (NFL) for twelve seasons, primarily with the Cincinnati Bengals. He played college football for the Georgia Bulldogs, earning first-team All-American honors before he was selected by the Bengals with the fourth overall pick in the 2011 NFL draft. He is regarded as one of the greatest wide receivers of his era.

In his first season with the Bengals, Green made the 2012 Pro Bowl becoming the first rookie receiver to make a Pro Bowl appearance in eight years, and went on to accumulate a total of seven Pro Bowl appearances throughout his career. From 2011 to 2013, Green caught more passes (260) than any other player in NFL history during their first three seasons, a record that was later broken by Jarvis Landry and Odell Beckham Jr. (288). He had six seasons with 1,000 or more receiving yards.

Green signed with the Cardinals in 2021, having finished his Bengals career ranked second in franchise history, behind only Chad Johnson, in receiving yards, receiving touchdowns, and receptions. On September 16, 2023, Green signed a one-day contract with the Bengals to retire with the team.

== Early life ==
When Green was age 4, his older brother and only sibling died in a car wreck on the way to a school carnival. Green was on his elementary school's juggling team, telling The Atlanta Journal-Constitution that he learned to juggle as early as second grade. Green said he could juggle as many as four items at once, and that the ability helped the development of his hand-eye coordination.

Green attended Summerville High School in Summerville, South Carolina, where he was a three-sport athlete in football, basketball, and track. He played as a wide receiver for the Summerville Green Wave football team, under coach John McKissick. He was widely considered to be one of the top national football prospects of the Class of 2008 and was listed #1 by Sports Illustrated. Green earned All-State honors four times and was the only junior nominated to the 2006 USA Today All-American first-team following 75 receptions for 1,422 yards and 16 touchdowns during his junior season. Green was also selected as a member of the Rivals.com Junior All-America team based on those stats. As a freshman, he had 57 receptions for 1,217 yards and eight touchdowns. As a sophomore, he had 60 catches for 1,203 yards and 14 touchdowns.

Green's 5,373 career receiving yards rank second in the all-time career receiving records of the National Federation of High Schools. His 279 career receptions rank fourth. In June 2006, Green was profiled by Sports Illustrated as part of its "Where Will They Be?" stories documenting athletes with the potential of becoming a future great, alongside Peter Uihlein, John Tavares, Tyreke Evans, Elena Delle Donne, and others. Sports Illustrated compared him to the then-Oakland Raiders wideout Randy Moss and predicted Green will be in the NFL by 2011. Green was also on the school's track & field team, where he competed as a long jumper (top-jump of 19 ft 6 in) and triple jumper (40 ft 0 in).

Rivals.com ranked Green as their No. 9 prospect for the high school class of 2008, while Scout.com named Green their No. 10 prospect nationally. He participated in the Under Armour All-America Game.

Green was also on the Summerville High high school basketball team that claimed the 2007–2008 South Carolina state championship in a championship game against Spartanburg (S.C.) High. The game was played in memory of their fallen assistant coach, Captain Louis Mulkey of the Charleston Fire Department in South Carolina, who died responding to a fire with eight other firefighters on June 18, 2007.

== College career ==
Green verbally committed to attend the University of Georgia in October 2006, and made his commitment official by signing a letter of intent to play at Georgia on February 6, 2008. He played for coach Mark Richt's Georgia Bulldogs football team from 2008 to 2010.

=== 2008 season ===
Green had a solid freshman season for the 10–3 Georgia Bulldogs in 2008. He joined a wide receivers unit that contained Mohamed Massaquoi, Michael Moore, Kris Durham, and Demiko Goodman. In the fourth game of his college career, against Arizona State, Green had eight catches for 159 yards and a touchdown in the 27–10 victory. For this, he was named SEC Player of the Week. On October 18, against SEC East rival Vanderbilt, he had seven receptions for 132 receiving yards in the 24–14 victory.

He finished the 2008 season with 56 catches for 963 yards and eight touchdowns, all Georgia freshman school records. He also led the SEC in receiving yards, with the third-highest total in UGA school history. He was named second-team All-SEC and Freshman of the Year by the SEC coaches, and was named to the Associated Press All-SEC first-team.

=== 2009 season ===
As a sophomore, Green became the top option for the Georgia wide receivers group that added newcomers Tavarres King and Rantavious Wooten. Green saw similar opportunities production-wise as a sophomore in Georgia's 8–5 season. On September 19, he had seven receptions for 137 receiving yards and two receiving touchdowns in a 52–41 victory on the road against Arkansas. He followed that up with eight receptions for 153 receiving yards and a receiving touchdown in a 20–17 victory over Arizona State in the next game. On November 14, against Auburn, he suffered a left shoulder injury, which kept him out of the remaining regular season games. He returned for the 2009 Independence Bowl, December 28, in Shreveport, Louisiana, where he made six catches totaling 57 yards in the 44–20 victory over the Texas A&M Aggies. Green ended the 2009 regular season with 53 catches for 808 yards and six touchdowns, leading the team in all those categories despite missing time due to injury.

Among other awards, Green was elected All-SEC First-team by Associated Press, SEC Coaches, ESPN, Phil Steele, and Sporting News.

=== 2010 season ===
Green's junior season started off tumultuous due to a compliance issue. He was suspended for the first four games of the 2010 regular season after he admitted to selling his 2009 Independence Bowl Jersey for $1,000 to former North Carolina defensive back Chris Hawkins, who the NCAA described as an agent or someone who markets amateur athletes. As part of his punishment, he was required to repay $1,000 to a charity. Green returned from the suspension on October 2 and had seven receptions for 119 receiving yards and two receiving touchdowns in a 29–27 road loss to Colorado. On November 6, against Idaho State, he had six receptions for 103 receiving yards and two receiving touchdowns in the 55–7 victory. In the following game against rival Auburn, he had nine receptions for 164 receiving yards and two receiving touchdowns in the 49–31 road loss. Green finished Georgia's 6–7 season with a team-high 57 catches for 848 yards and nine touchdowns.

On January 9, 2011, Green officially declared for the 2011 NFL draft. He finished his three seasons at the University of Georgia with 166 receptions for 2,619 yards and 23 touchdowns.

== Professional career ==
Pre-draft measurables
Height	Weight	Arm length	Hand span	Wingspan	40-yard dash	10-yard split	20-yard split	20-yard shuttle	Three-cone drill	Vertical jump	Broad jump	Bench press	Wonderlic
6 ft 3 5/8 in (1.92 m)	211 lb (96 kg)	34 3/8 in (0.87 m)	9 1/4 in (0.23 m)	6 ft 8 5/8 in (2.05 m)	4.49 s	1.56 s	2.63 s	4.21 s	6.91 s	34.5 in (0.88 m)	10 ft 6 in (3.20 m)	18 reps	10
All values from NFL Combine

=== Cincinnati Bengals ===
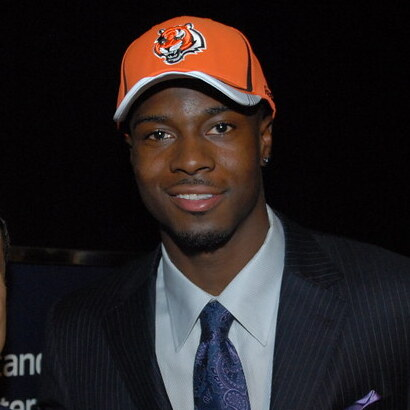
Green at the 2011 NFL draft

==== 2011 season ====
Green was selected in the first round with the fourth overall pick in the 2011 NFL Draft by the Cincinnati Bengals. He became the highest drafted wide receiver in Georgia school history, breaking the mark set by Lindsay Scott, who went 13th overall in 1984. On July 28, 2011, Green agreed to a four-year contract with the Cincinnati Bengals worth $19.6 million. After signing with the Cincinnati Bengals, Green became a member of School of the Legends (SOTL) in 2011. Green was featured in the 2011 NFLPA Rookie Debut "One Team" Celebration which streamed live on YouTube from New York City's Cipriani Wall Street. The event was produced by SOTL, a licensed partner of the NFLPA, and employed YouTube's live streaming platform.

Green's first NFL reception was a 41-yard touchdown reception from quarterback Bruce Gradkowski against the Cleveland Browns in the Bengals' 2011 regular season opener, a 27–17 victory. In the following game, Green recorded his first 100-yard game with ten receptions for 124 receiving yards and one receiving touchdown in a 24–22 loss to the Denver Broncos. By the end of his rookie season, Green recorded four 100-yard games and led all NFL rookies in receptions and receiving yards, catching 65 passes for 1,057 yards in 15 games. His seven touchdown receptions were second among rookies – one behind Julio Jones of the Atlanta Falcons. On December 18, 2011, Green and fellow rookie quarterback Andy Dalton surpassed the all-time NFL record for yards and receptions by a rookie quarterback/receiver tandem. One week later on December 24, 2011, Green's 1,031 yards surpassed Cris Collinsworth's franchise record of 1,009 yards set in 1981 for most receiving yards by a rookie. Green made his playoff debut in the Wild Card Round against the Houston Texans. In the 31–10 loss, he had five receptions for 47 receiving yards. Green earned a Pro Bowl nomination for his rookie season in addition to being named to the NFL All-Rookie Team. He was ranked 77th by his fellow players on the NFL Top 100 Players of 2012.

==== 2012 season ====
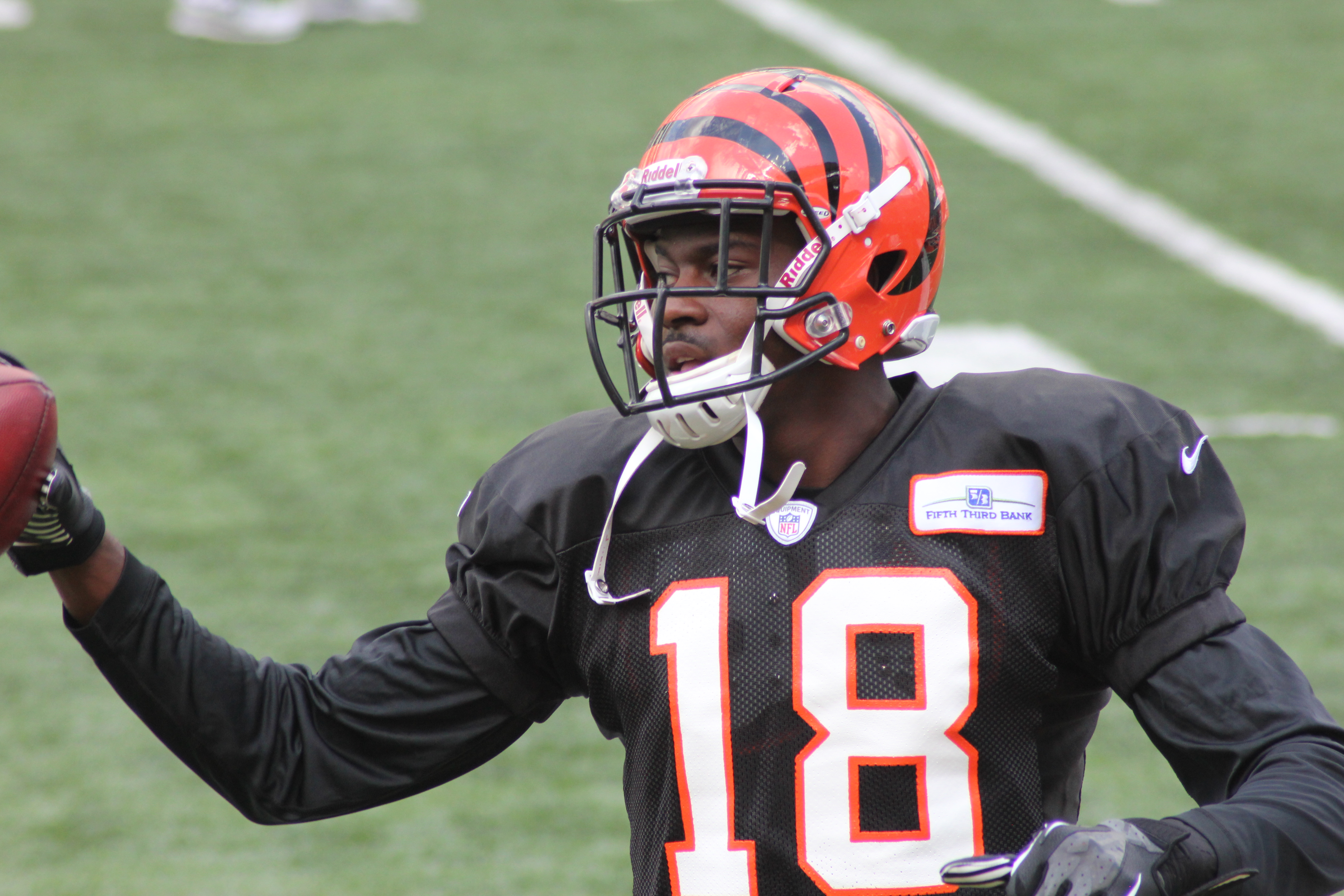
Green in 2012

In Week 3 of the 2012 regular season, Green caught nine passes for a career-high 183 yards in a 38–31 win over the Washington Redskins. He earned AFC Offensive Player of the Month for September. In Week 6, against the Browns, he had seven receptions for 135 receiving yards and two touchdowns in the 34–24 loss. In Week 9, he caught a 56-yard touchdown against the New York Giants extending his touchdown streak to eight consecutive games, the longest in the NFL by a receiver and second-longest overall. He extended the streak to nine following a four-yard touchdown in a 28–6 victory over the Kansas City Chiefs in Week 11. On December 23, Green recorded his first career lost fumble against the Pittsburgh Steelers, but he finished the game with 10 receptions for 116 yards, including a 21-yard reception that set up the game-winning field goal. Green gained over 100 receiving yards in five different games and was selected to his second Pro Bowl. He finished the season with 97 receptions for 1,350 yards and 11 touchdowns. In the Bengals' Wild Card Round loss to the Texans, he was the team's leading receiver with five receptions for 80 yards. He was ranked 16th by his fellow players on the NFL Top 100 Players of 2013.

==== 2013 season ====
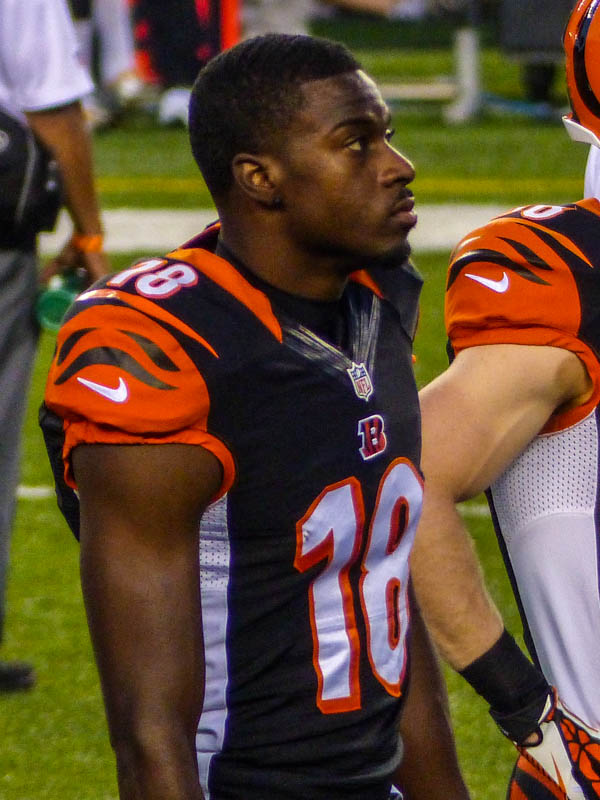
Green in a game against the Pittsburgh Steelers in 2013

Green started off the 2013 season with nine receptions for 162 receiving yards and two receiving touchdowns in a 24–21 loss to the Chicago Bears. In Week 7, against the Detroit Lions, he scored on a career-long 82-yard touchdown reception on the Bengals' first drive of the game in the 27–24 victory. In Week 10, against the Baltimore Ravens, he recorded a 51-yard touchdown reception on the game's last play in regulation to tie the game. However, the Bengals eventually lost in overtime. He had a franchise-record five consecutive games with at least 100 receiving yards from Week 6 to Week 10. In Week 16, against the Minnesota Vikings, he had seven receptions for 97 receiving yards and two receiving touchdowns in the 42–14 victory. Green set new career highs in 2013 for receptions (98) and receiving yards (1,426, which was the third-highest total in Bengals history), while scoring 11 touchdowns. He was targeted a franchise-record 178 times, breaking the 174 targets for Carl Pickens in 1996. Green was named to his third Pro Bowl and was ranked ninth by his fellow players on the NFL Top 100 Players of 2014. His 260 career receptions set an NFL record for most receptions in a player's first three seasons, which was later broken by Odell Beckham Jr. and Jarvis Landry in 2016 after both tallied 288.

The Bengals finished with an 11–5 record and won the AFC North. In the Wild Card Round against the San Diego Chargers, Green had three receptions for 34 yards in the 27–10 loss.

==== 2014 season ====
Green caught six passes for 131 yards, including a 77-yard fourth quarter touchdown reception, in the Bengals 23–16 win over the Ravens in Week 1. In Week 2, he suffered a game-ending ligament injury on the Bengals opening drive against the Falcons, resulting in Green's first career NFL game without a reception. He returned the following week against the Tennessee Titans and recorded six receptions for 102 yards in the 33–7 victory. In Week 5, against the New England Patriots, he re-aggravated his lingering toe injury and missed the following three games. In Week 14, he recorded 224 yards on 11 receptions (a 20.4 average) and one touchdown in a 42–21 loss to the Pittsburgh Steelers. Green's 224 receiving yards marked the third most the Steelers had ever given up in a game to one player.

Despite missing three games and nearly all of two more, Green still recorded his fourth consecutive 1,000 yard season, finishing the year with 69 receptions for 1,041 yards and six touchdowns. However, a concussion ultimately forced him to miss the postseason for the first time in his career. He was ranked 37th by his peers on the NFL Top 100 Players of 2015.

==== 2015 season ====
Green was an instrumental part of the Bengals recording a franchise-record tying 12 victories in 2015. In Week 3 of the 2015 season, Green caught 10 passes for a career-high 227 yards and two fourth quarter touchdowns in a 28–24 win over the Ravens. His 227 yards were the second highest single game total in franchise history, trailing only Chad Johnson's 260 receiving yards in a 2006 game against the Chargers. In Week 8, against the Steelers, he had 11 receptions for 118 receiving yards and a touchdown in the 16–10 victory. In Week 12, against the St. Louis Rams, he recorded his second multi-touchdown game of the season. In Week 13 against the Browns and Week 14 against the Steelers, he recorded consecutive 100 yard games while catching another touchdown. He finished the 2015 season with 86 receptions, 1,297 yards, and 10 touchdowns while recording his fifth straight 1,000-yard season to start a career. He joined Randy Moss as the only players in NFL history to accomplish the feat at the time.

During the Wild Card Round against the Steelers, he caught five passes for 71 yards and his first postseason touchdown, which put the Bengals up 16–15 with less than two minutes remaining. However, a late turnover and penalty by the Bengals loomed large as the Bengals lost 16–18. He earned his fifth straight Pro Bowl and was ranked 16th by his fellow players on the NFL Top 100 Players of 2016.

==== 2016 season ====
In the Bengals' season opener against the New York Jets, Green had 12 receptions for 180 receiving yards, including a 54-yard touchdown as the Bengals won by a score of 23–22. Green had three key receptions on the Bengals' drive to set up the late go-ahead field goal. In Week 4, he caught 10 passes for 173 receiving yards and a touchdown during a 22–7 victory over the Miami Dolphins on Thursday Night Football. In Week 7, the Bengals defeated the Browns while Green finished the win with eight receptions for 169 receiving yards and a 48-yard touchdown. The following game, Green recorded nine catches for 121 receiving yards in a 27–27 tie with the Redskins. Green returned in Week 10 and caught seven passes for 68 yards and a touchdown during the Bengals' 21–20 loss at the Giants.

On November 20, Green sustained a tear to his hamstring in the first quarter of a 16–12 loss to the Buffalo Bills. He was inactive for the next five games before being placed on injured reserve prior to the regular-season finale. Green finished the 2016 season with 66 receptions, 964 receiving yards, and four touchdown receptions in 10 games. This marked the first time in Green's career that he failed to reach 1,000 receiving yards. Despite the injury, Green was named to his sixth straight Pro Bowl on December 20. He was ranked 17th by his peers on the NFL Top 100 Players of 2017.

==== 2017 season ====
In Week 3, against the Green Bay Packers, Green recorded ten receptions for 111 yards and one touchdown in the 27–24 overtime loss. In Week 5 against the Bills, Green had two passes deflected off his hands that were intercepted and he lost a fumble, but still had an impressive outing with seven receptions for 189 receiving yards as the Bengals won 20–16. In Week 9 against the Jacksonville Jaguars, Green got into a fight with Jalen Ramsey, resulting in both players being ejected and his first ever foul. He was later fined $42,541. In Week 10 against the Titans, he recorded five receptions for 115 receiving yards and a touchdown as the Bengals lost 24–20. In Week 13 against the Steelers, he caught two touchdowns in the 23–20 loss. On December 19, 2017, Green was named to his seventh straight Pro Bowl. Overall, he finished the 2017 season with 75 receptions for 1,078 receiving yards and eight touchdowns in the Bengals' 7–9 season. 2017 marked the seventh consecutive season that Green led the Bengals in receiving yards, breaking the mark of six set by Chad Ochocinco and Cris Collinsworth. He was ranked 22nd by his fellow players on the NFL Top 100 Players of 2018.

==== 2018 season ====
On September 13, 2018, Green had the first three-touchdown game of his career against the Ravens, completing the hat-trick in the first half, with each of his first three catches resulting in touchdowns in the 34–23 victory. In Week 4, against the Falcons, with the Bengals trailing by five with only 12 seconds remaining, Dalton connected with Green on a 13-yard pass to give the Bengals the game-winning points. On October 7, in a 27–17 win over the Dolphins in, Green caught six passes for 112 yards, setting a franchise record with his 32nd 100-yard receiving game, breaking the previous mark by Chad Johnson. He suffered a toe injury in Week 8 against the Tampa Bay Buccaneers and missed the next three games. Green returned in Week 13 against the Broncos but re-injured his toe and was placed on injured reserve on December 5. He finished the 2018 season with 46 receptions for 694 receiving yards and six touchdowns, ending his Pro Bowl streak at seven seasons, as the Bengals finished with a 6–10 record. He was ranked 58th by his fellow players on the NFL Top 100 Players of 2019.

==== 2019 season ====
During training camp, Green suffered torn ligaments in his ankle while practicing with the team at Welcome Stadium in Dayton, Ohio. Despite being expected to only miss a handful of games early in the season, he ended up missing the entire year, being inactive for every game before being placed on injured reserve on December 23, 2019.

==== 2020 season ====
On March 16, 2020, the Bengals placed the franchise tag on Green. He signed the one-year tender on July 17, 2020. He made his official return from injury in the Bengals' 2020 regular season opener against the Los Angeles Chargers. He scored his first touchdown since Week 8 of the 2018 season in Week 11 against the Washington Football Team. Overall, in the 2020 season, he finished with 47 receptions for 523 receiving yards and two receiving touchdowns as the Bengals finished with a 4–11–1 record. He finished his Bengals career second to Chad Johnson in receptions, receiving yards, and receiving touchdowns.

=== Arizona Cardinals ===
==== 2021 season ====
Green signed a one-year deal worth $8.5 million, with $6 million guaranteed, with the Arizona Cardinals on March 17, 2021. He entered the 2021 season as a starter alongside DeAndre Hopkins and Christian Kirk. In Week 3, against the Jaguars, he had five receptions for 112 yards in the 31–19 victory. For Green, it was his first game reaching at least 100 yards since Week 7 of the 2018 season. In Week 8, against the Packers, Green was targeted on a potential game-winning play by Kyler Murray. A miscommunication on the play led to Green not looking at the thrown pass and it led to an interception by Rasul Douglas. In Week 14, against the Los Angeles Rams, Green eclipsed 10,000 career receiving yards. He finished the season with 54 catches for 848 yards and three touchdowns.

==== 2022 season ====
On April 14, 2022, Green re-signed with the Cardinals on a one-year contract.

In his final career game against the San Francisco 49ers, Green recorded three catches for 91 yards, including a 77-yard touchdown reception off a flea-flicker from David Blough. In the 2022 season, Green played in 15 games, starting ten. He finished with 24 receptions for 236 receiving yards and two receiving touchdowns.

=== Retirement ===
On February 6, 2023, Green posted on Instagram that he would be retiring after two seasons with the Cardinals. He finished his NFL career with 10,514 career yards. On September 16, 2023, Green signed a one-day contract with the Bengals to retire with the team.

== Career statistics ==
=== NFL ===
Career best in bold

==== Regular season ====
Year	Team	Games		Receiving					Rushing					Fumbles	
Year	Team	GP	GS	Rec	Yds	Avg	Lng	TD	Att	Yds	Avg	Lng	TD	Fum	Lost
2011	CIN	15	15	65	1,057	**16.3**	58	7	**5**	**53**	**10.6**	**22**	0	1	**0**
2012	CIN	16	16	97	1,350	13.9	73	**11**	4	38	9.5	20	0	2	1
2013	CIN	16	16	**98**	**1,426**	14.6	**82**	**11**	—	—	—	—	—	1	**0**
2014	CIN	13	13	69	1,041	15.1	81	6	2	2	1.0	5	0	3	2
2015	CIN	16	16	86	1,297	15.1	80	10	—	—	—	—	—	1	1
2016	CIN	10	10	66	964	14.6	54	4	—	—	—	—	—	**0**	**0**
2017	CIN	16	16	75	1,078	14.4	77T	8	—	—	—	—	—	2	2
2018	CIN	9	9	46	694	15.1	38T	6	—	—	—	—	—	2	1
2019	CIN	Did not play due to injury													
2020	CIN	16	14	47	523	11.1	33	2	—	—	—	—	—	**0**	**0**
2021	ARI	16	9	54	848	15.7	42	3	—	—	—	—	—	**0**	**0**
2022	ARI	15	10	24	236	9.8	77	2	—	—	—	—	—	**0**	**0**
Career		158	144	727	10,514	14.5	82	70	11	93	8.5	22	0	12	7

==== Postseason ====
Year	Team	Games		Receiving					Fumbles	
Year	Team	GP	GS	Rec	Yds	Avg	Lng	TD	Fum	Lost
2011	CIN	1	1	**5**	47	9.4	21	0	0	0
2012	CIN	1	1	**5**	**80**	**16.0**	**45**	0	0	0
2013	CIN	1	1	3	34	11.3	14	0	0	0
2014	CIN	Did not play due to injury								
2015	CIN	1	1	**5**	71	14.2	25	**1**	0	0
2021	ARI	1	1	0	0	0.0	0	0	0	0
Career		5	5	18	232	12.9	45	1	0	0

=== College ===
Season	Team	GP	Rec	Yds	TD
2008	Georgia	13	56	963	8
2009	Georgia	10	53	808	6
2010	Georgia	9	57	848	9
Total		32	166	2,619	23

== Personal life ==
On March 21, 2015, he married actress and singer Miranda Brooke, his college sweetheart. They have two sons together.

In 2015, Green endowed three separate scholarships designed to assist one student-athlete on the Georgia football team and two needs-based students attending Georgia.

In 2018, Green took part in the NFL's "My Cause, My Cleats" campaign. Green's choice was "Hope Road Nicaragua", which is an organization that assists with improving the lives of children in Nicaragua.

In 2019, Green donated money to elementary school teachers in his hometown of Summerville.

== See also ==
- List of Cincinnati Bengals first-round draft picks
- List of National Football League career receiving yards leaders
