= Joe Cox (American football) =

American football player and coach (born 1986)

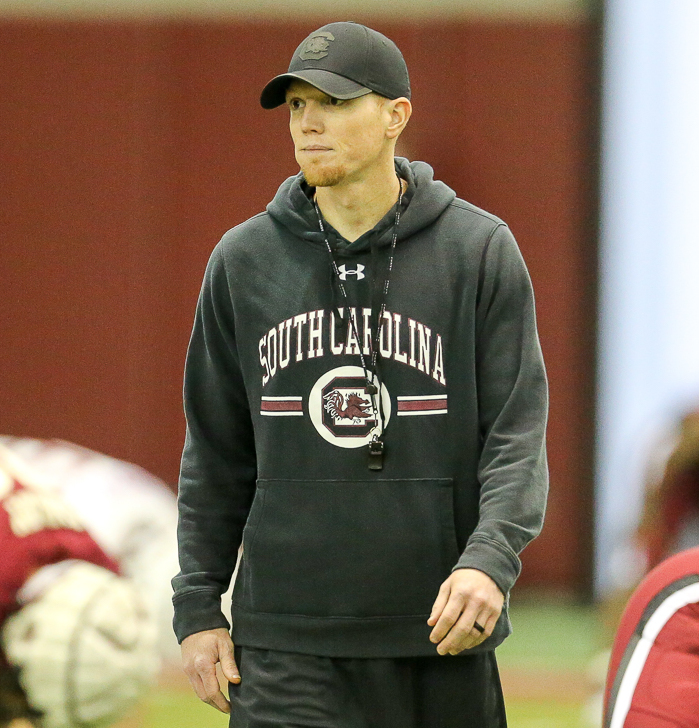
- Cox in 2020

Current position
- Title: Co-offensive coordinator & tight ends coach
- Team: LSU
- Conference: SEC

Biographical details
- Born: November 27, 1986 (age 39); Charlotte, North Carolina, U.S.

Playing career
- 2005–2009: Georgia
- Position: Quarterback

Coaching career (HC unless noted)
- 2014: Mallard Creek HS (OC)
- 2015: Colorado State (GA)
- 2016–2019: Colorado State (TE)
- 2020: South Carolina (WR)
- 2021: Charlotte (TE)
- 2022–2023: Alabama (TE)
- 2024–2025: Ole Miss (co-OC/TE)
- 2026–present: LSU (co-OC/TE)

Joseph Howell Cox (born November 27, 1986) is an American football coach for LSU and a former college football quarterback. He played college football for four seasons at the University of Georgia, and was the team's starting quarterback for the 2009 season.

== Early life ==
Cox played at Independence High School in Charlotte, North Carolina. He was named to the 2004 "Parade Magazine" All-America Team and "Super Prep" All-Mid Atlantic Team. He was also the North Carolina Gatorade Player of the Year in 2004. He was on the Associated Press first-team All-State team and was twice named Charlotte Observer Offensive Player of the Year. Cox also played in the Shrine Bowl of the Carolinas and impressed scouts by going 31–0 as starting quarterback at Independence. He was twice a team captain and was rated the number seven quarterback in the country by Rivals and Tom Lemming of ESPN. He set a North Carolina record with 66 touchdown passes while taking his team to its fifth consecutive state championship his senior year. He was named the MVP of the NCHSAA 4AA state title game twice. As a junior, he threw for nearly 4,000 yards and over 40 touchdowns. As a senior, he completed 240 out of 363 passes for over 4,500 yards and only five interceptions.

== College career ==
=== 2005–2008 ===
Cox was redshirted in his freshman year in 2005. During the first four years of his career at the University of Georgia, Cox had scattered playing time and completed 33 out of 58 pass attempts for 432 yards with five touchdowns and one interception. As a redshirt freshman in 2006, with Georgia trailing Colorado 0–13 at home late in the third quarter, Cox was put in the game to relieve the ineffective starter Matthew Stafford. Cox threw for 153 yards and two touchdowns late in the game to lead Georgia to a comeback win, 14–13. Cox started one more game in the season, in a 14–9 victory over Ole Miss, but eventually lost his starting place to the highly-touted Stafford, who went on to be the first overall pick in the 2009 NFL draft.

=== 2009 ===
Cox was the starting quarterback for Georgia during the 2009 season. Georgia finished the season 8–5 with Cox as the starter. In Georgia's 52–41 win over Arkansas in Fayetteville, he threw for a career-high 375 yards and matched a team record with five touchdown passes. Against the #1-ranked Florida Gators, he completed 11 of 20 pass attempts for two touchdowns, which was as many as the Gators had allowed all season, but also threw three interceptions in the 17–41 loss. In his final game at Sanford Stadium, the Bulldogs had a 14-point half-time lead, but Cox threw two interceptions in the fourth quarter. Those interceptions, along with a red-zone fumble (as Georgia was attempting to tie the game), sealed a loss against Kentucky, Georgia's first home loss to the Wildcats since 1977. In the final regular season game against the #7-ranked Georgia Tech, Bulldog tailbacks Caleb King and Washaun Ealey combining for 349 rushing yards, with Cox managing the game well, completing 8 of 14 passes for just 76 yards and a touchdown in Georgia's 30–24 victory. The Bulldogs topped the 2009 season off with an Independence Bowl victory over Texas A&M, with Cox throwing for 157 yards and two touchdowns.

=== College statistics ===
Year	Team	Passing								Rushing			
Year	Team	Cmp	Att	Pct	Yds	Y/A	TD	Int	Rtg	Att	Yds	Avg	TD
2005	Georgia	(redshirt) Redshirted											
2006	Georgia	17	28	60.7	225	8.0	2	1	144.6	1	1	1.0	0
2007	Georgia	5	15	33.3	56	3.7	1	0	86.7	0	0	0.0	0
2008	Georgia	11	15	73.3	151	10.1	2	0	201.9	3	14	4.7	0
2009	Georgia	185	331	55.9	2,584	7.8	24	15	136.3	31	−28	−0.9	0
Career		218	389	56.0	3,016	7.9	29	16	137.5	35	−13	−0.4	0

== Coaching career ==
In June 2013, Cox joined the coaching staff at Mallard Creek High School in Charlotte, North Carolina, as the quarterbacks' position coach. On December 14, 2013, the Mallard Creek team won its first state championship. In 2014, he became the offensive co-ordinator for Mallard Creek and led the Maverick offense to its second state title on December 13, 2014.

On February 3, 2015, it was announced that Cox had left Mallard Creek High School to become a graduate assistant for the Colorado State Rams. In January 2016, he was promoted to tight ends coach for Colorado State.

On January 10, 2020, it was announced that Cox had joined the coaching staff of the South Carolina Gamecocks football as tight ends coach.

Following the departure of the former offensive co-ordinator/wide receivers coach Bryan McClendon to Oregon, Will Muschamp moved Bobby Bentley back to tight ends and Cox was moved to wide receivers.

In December 2020, the new South Carolina head coach, Shane Beamer, announced he had hired a new team of coaches, and that Cox would not be retained. He was replaced by the former Arkansas wide receivers coach, Justin Stepp.

On February 15, 2021, Cox was named the Charlotte 49ers' tight ends coach.

On February 4, 2022, Cox was named tight ends coach for the University of Alabama.
