= Jay Feely =

American football player and sportscaster (born 1976)

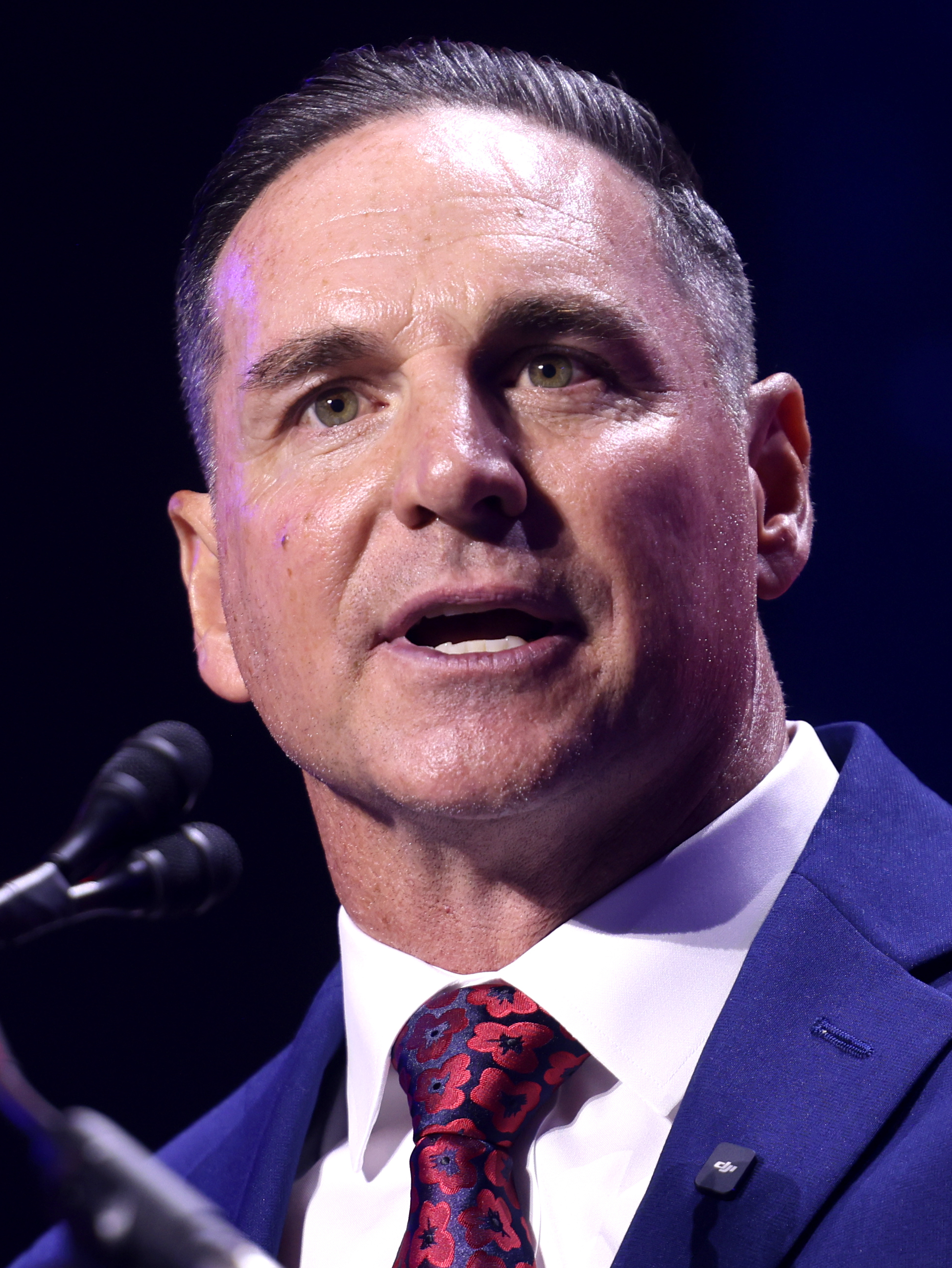
- Feely in 2026

No. 4, 2, 3
- Position: Placekicker

Personal information
- Born: May 23, 1976 (age 50); Odessa, Florida, U.S.
- Listed height: 5 ft 10 in (1.78 m)
- Listed weight: 208 lb (94 kg)

Career information
- High school: Jesuit (Tampa, Florida)
- College: Michigan (1994–1998)
- NFL draft: 1999: undrafted

Career history
- Florida Bobcats (1999); Tampa Bay Storm (2000); Atlanta Falcons (2001–2004); New York Giants (2005–2006); Miami Dolphins (2007); Kansas City Chiefs (2008)*; New York Jets (2008–2009); Arizona Cardinals (2010–2013); Chicago Bears (2014)
- * Offseason or practice squad member only

Awards and highlights
- PFWA All-Rookie Team (2001); FBS national champion (1997)

Career NFL statistics
- Field goals made: 332
- Field goals attempted: 402
- Field goal %: 82.6
- Longest field goal: 61
- Stats at Pro Football Reference

Thomas James Feely (born May 23, 1976) is an American politician and former professional football player. He started his playing career as a placekicker with the Florida Bobcats in the Arena Football League (AFL) as a free agent in 1999 before playing for several National Football League (NFL) teams. Following his retirement until 2025, Feely worked as a reporter and analyst for the NFL on CBS.

Feely played college football for the Michigan Wolverines. He was also a member of the AFL's Tampa Bay Storm and in the NFL with the Atlanta Falcons, New York Giants, Miami Dolphins, Kansas City Chiefs, New York Jets, Arizona Cardinals and Chicago Bears. He was a member of the Pro Football Weekly All-Rookie Team with the Falcons in 2001.

Feely is the Republican nominee for Arizona's 1st congressional district in 2026, after previously launching a campaign in the 5th district.

== Early life ==
Feely attended Jesuit High School in Tampa, Florida. While there, he set Hillsborough County career and season records for field goals and extra points. Feely played for the Temple Terrace Spirit Soccer team that won the National Championships when he was 16 years old.

== College career ==
Feely was a four-year letterman at the University of Michigan from 1994 to 1998. As a senior in 1998, he converted 17 of 22 field goal attempts and 40 of 41 point-after attempts on his way to a mention for the All-Big Ten team. His longest career field goal was 51-yard kick against Baylor as a junior. He finished his career 20-for-26 in field goals and 43-for-44 in extra points.

== Professional career ==
=== Florida Bobcats ===
After going undrafted in the 1999 NFL draft, Feely kicked for the Florida Bobcats of the Arena Football League. That season, he went 2-for-5 in field goal attempts and 8-for-13 in extra point attempts. He added three tackles (two solo) and forced a fumble.

=== Tampa Bay Storm ===
Feely kicked for the Tampa Bay Storm in 2000, converting one of six field goal attempts and three of four extra point attempts. He returned one kickoff for 22 yards.

=== Atlanta Falcons ===
In March 2001, Feely worked out for the Washington Redskins but was not signed. On April 12, he signed a one-year, $209,000 contract with the Atlanta Falcons. Although Jake Arians had been expected to be the Falcons' placekicker during the 2001 season, Feely won the job.

As a rookie with the Falcons in 2001, Feely converted 29 of 37 field goal attempts (78.4%) and all 28 extra point attempts. He also converted 14 of 15 field goals away from the Georgia Dome. His 115 points tied him with the Eagles' David Akers for second in the NFC, behind only Rams kicker Jeff Wilkins. Feely converted a 55-yard attempt against the Arizona Cardinals on September 30. He also caught one pass for -2 yards from Falcons punter Chris Mohr on a fake field goal attempt. For his performance during the season, Feely was a consensus all-rookie selection.

An exclusive-rights free agent in the 2002 offseason, Feely was tendered a one-year, $300,000 contract by the Falcons on February 22. He signed the deal on June 7. That season, he converted 32 of 40 field goal attempts (80 percent) and all but one of 43 extra point attempts. His 32 field goals tied him with Tampa Bay Buccaneers kicker Martín Gramática for most in the NFL. It also broke Morten Andersen's previous franchise record of 31 set in 1995. Feely earned NFL Special Teams Player of the Week honors after converting three field goals of more than 40 yards against the Carolina Panthers on October 20, and eventually earned NFC Special Teams Player of the Month honors for converting 9 of 10 field goals and all nine points after touchdowns. In 2003, Feely converted 19 of 27 field goal attempts (70.4 percent) and 32 of 33 extra point attempts.

On March 6, 2004, the Falcons re-signed Feely – a restricted free agent – to a one-year contract worth $628,000. That season, he achieved a field goal percentage of 78.3 by converting 18 of 23 tries. He connected on all 40 of his extra point attempts that season. On September 19 against the St. Louis Rams, he recovered his own onside kick. In two playoff games, Feely was a perfect 2-for-2 in field goals and 7-for-7 on PATs.

=== New York Giants ===
An unrestricted free agent in the 2005 offseason, Feely signed a three-year deal with the New York Giants on March 12. The contract included base salaries of $540,000 (2005), $545,000 (2006) and $550,000 (2007). In a preseason game against the New York Jets that year, Feely scored all his team's points in a 15–14 victory by connecting on five field goals, including two over 50 yards. In week 12 in 2005 at the Seahawks however, Feely failed to connect on 3 consecutive potential game-winning field goals, and the Giants lost 24–21 despite compiling 490 yards total offense. The Giants ended up in a wild-card playoff game where they lost to Carolina. Feely broke the New York Giants franchise record for best field goal percentage over a two-year period. He had an 83% followed by an 85% year while with the Giants.

=== Miami Dolphins ===
As a free agent in the 2007 offseason, the Miami Dolphins signed Feely to a three-year contract worth just under $5 million on March 8. The team subsequently traded placekicker Olindo Mare to the New Orleans Saints on April 3.

During his first season with the Dolphins, Feely experienced the most productive season of his career and in franchise history. He missed just two of his 23 field goal attempts, setting a new franchise record for field goal percentage at 91.3. The record had previously been 90.5 percent by Mare in 2001. Through the 2007 season, Feely had converted 164 straight extra point attempts and had created five recovered onside kicks.

During the 2008 offseason, it was reported that new Dolphins Vice President Bill Parcells did not like Feely's outspoken nature and that he would not be assured a roster spot despite his 2007 success. The Dolphins released fellow kicker Dave Rayner on June 6, leaving only undrafted rookie Dan Carpenter (Montana) to challenge Feely for the team's placekicking job in 2008. He was released by the Dolphins on August 12, 2008.

=== Kansas City Chiefs ===
On August 25, 2008, Feely was signed by the Kansas City Chiefs, and released one day later after two other potential kickers connected on more field goals in practice.

=== New York Jets ===
After New York Jets kicker Mike Nugent was injured in the team's Week 1 contest against the Miami Dolphins, they signed Feely on September 8, 2008. On November 13, Feely kicked a game-winning 34-yard field goal in overtime against the New England Patriots; the Jets took sole possession of first place in the AFC East for the first time since November 19, 2001.

Through 10 games, Feely had made 16 of his 20 field goal attempts (80.0%), with an average of 35.1 yards and a long of 55 yards and converted all 23 PATs for a total of 71 points. Feely reportedly began working out his upper body five days a week in the Jets new training facility, saying, "I work out hard in the weight room just so I don't get injured." His workout primarily centered on deadlifts.

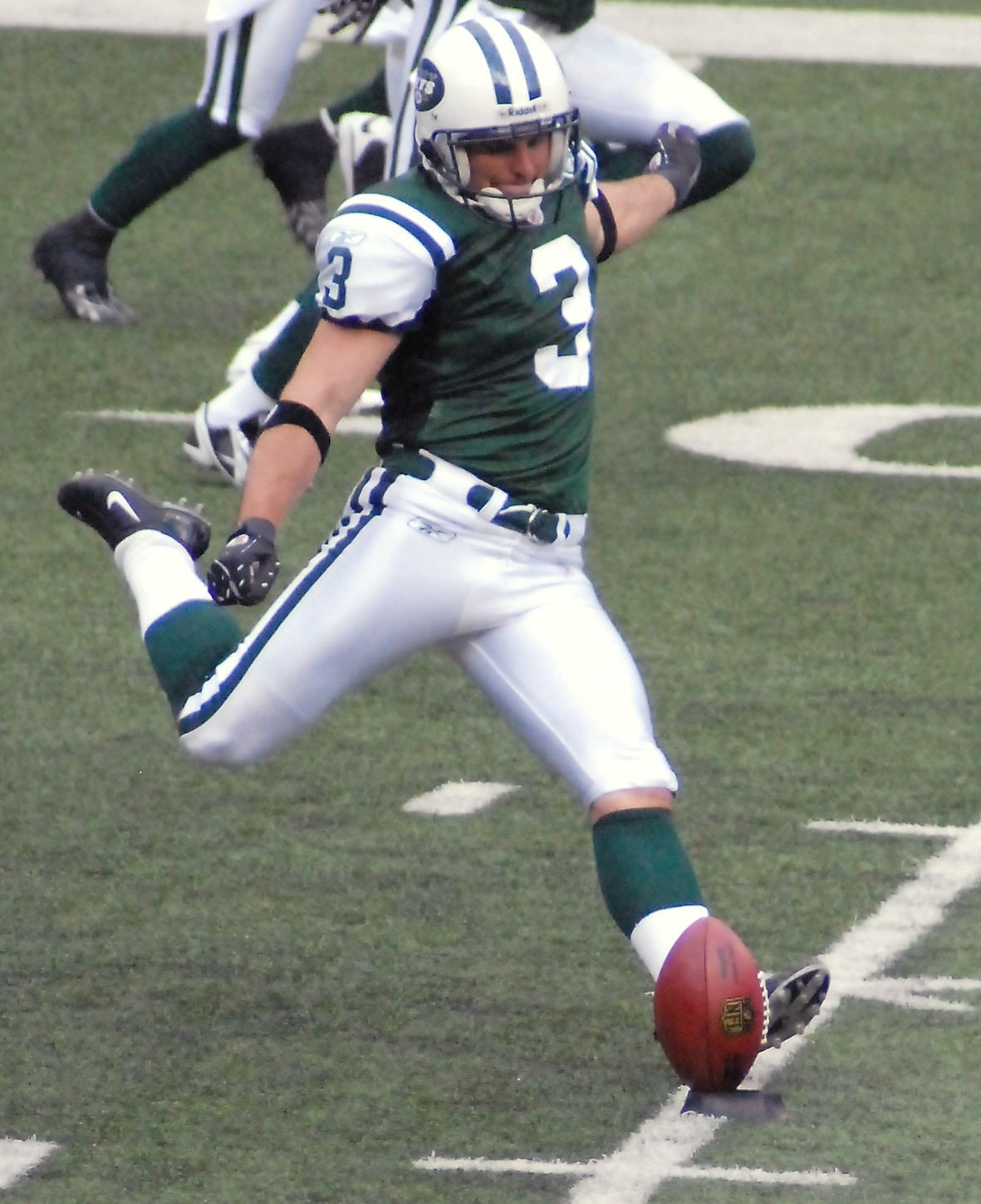
Feely in November 2008.

On March 4, 2009, Feely re-signed a one-year contract with the Jets.

In week six of the 2009 season against the Buffalo Bills, Feely broke Pat Leahy's record of 23 consecutive field goals, hitting his 24th. However, he missed his next attempt in the second-quarter, leaving the team record at 24.

On December 21, 2009, Feely went 0–2 in field goal attempts. He "shanked" a 38-yard try and had a 37-yarder blocked, as the Jets lost to the Atlanta Falcons 10–7. On January 9, 2010, Feely recorded his first career punt in a playoff game against the Cincinnati Bengals, when he was unexpectedly pressed into service after his teammate Steve Weatherford was sidelined with an irregular heartbeat.

=== Arizona Cardinals ===
Feely signed with the Arizona Cardinals on April 2, 2010. On December 12, 2010, Feely became just the fourth kicker in 40 years to run for a touchdown, scoring on a fake field goal against the Denver Broncos. With his career-high day of five field goals and four extra points in the 43–13 victory, Feely contributed a total of 25 points, the most points scored by a player in a single game since October 21, 2007, when Rob Bironas scored 26 against the Houston Texans. On Christmas Day in 2010, Feely kicked a 48-yard field goal for a win over the Dallas Cowboys. On October 14, 2012, in a Week 6 matchup against the Buffalo Bills, Feely hit a 61-yard field goal, setting a new career best. However, in the same game, his 38-yard field goal attempt was deflected with three seconds left in the fourth quarter, which the Cardinals went on to lose 16–19 in OT. Feely re-signed with the Cardinals for the 2014 season. The Cardinals released Feely on August 25, 2014.

=== Chicago Bears ===
The Chicago Bears signed Feely on December 3, 2014, as injury cover for Robbie Gould when he was considered doubtful for a game against the Dallas Cowboys. Feely played the remaining four games of the season for the Chicago Bears, three of which were at Soldier Field.

== Career regular season statistics ==
Regular season statistics
Season	Team (record)	G	FGM	FGA	%	<20	20-29	30-39	40-49	50+	LNG	BLK	XPM	XPA	%	PTS
2001	ATL (7–9)	16	29	37	78.4	1–1	8–8	14–15	4–9	2–4	55	1	28	28	100.0	115
2002	ATL (9–6–1)	16	32	40	80.0	0–0	8–10	12–14	11–13	1–3	52	3	42	43	97.7	138
2003	ATL (5–11)	16	19	27	70.4	0–0	6–6	9–11	4–7	0–3	46	2	32	33	97.0	89
2004	ATL (11–5)	16	18	23	78.3	1–1	7–7	7–9	3–6	0–0	47	0	40	40	100.0	94
2005	NYG (11–5)	16	35	42	83.3	0–0	11–13	13–14	8–10	3–5	52	1	43	43	100.0	148
2006	NYG (8–8)	16	23	27	85.2	0–0	7–7	10–11	6–8	0–1	47	0	38	38	100.0	107
2007	MIA (1–15)	16	21	23	91.3	0–0	7–7	6–6	7–9	1–1	53	0	26	26	100.0	89
2008	NYJ (9–7)	15	24	28	85.7	0–0	9–9	9–12	4–5	2–2	55	0	39	39	100.0	111
2009	NYJ (9–7)	16	30	36	83.3	0–0	6–6	12–15	11–14	1–1	55	1	32	32	100.0	122
2010	ARI (5–11)	16	24	27	88.9	0–0	8–8	6–6	8–10	2–3	55	0	29	29	100.0	107
2011	ARI (8–8)	16	19	24	79.2	0–0	9–9	4–6	5–7	1–2	51	0	33	33	100.0	90
2012	ARI (5–11)	16	25	28	89.3	0–0	6–6	9–10	8–10	2–2	61	1	25	25	100.0	100
2013	ARI (10–6)	16	30	36	83.3	0–0	9–11	7–8	11–12	3–5	52	1	37	37	100.0	127
2014	CHI (5–11)	4	3	4	75.0	0–0	1–1	1–1	1–2	0–0	48	1	5	6	83.3	14
Career (14 seasons)		211	332	402	82.6	2–2	102–108	119–138	91–122	18–32	61	11	449	452	99.3	1445

== In the media ==
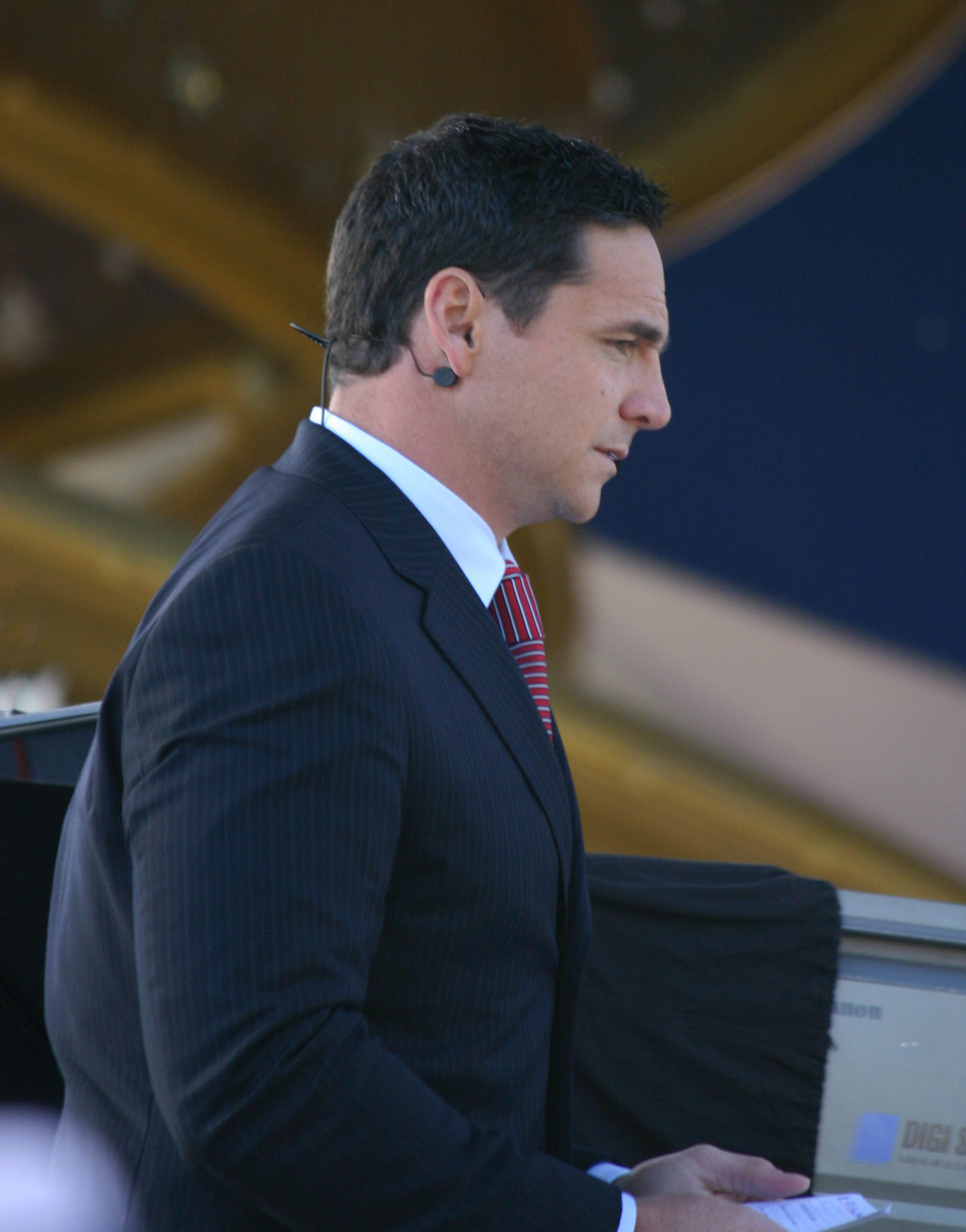
Feely on First Take in 2010

Feely appeared on ESPN First Take, and also with his wife Rebecca, on A Baby Story on TLC, which aired January 11, 2006.

After missing three field goals for the Giants in an overtime loss to the Seattle Seahawks in 2005, Feely was the subject of a Saturday Night Live sketch. The NFL Films parody, entitled The Long Ride Home: The Jay Feely Story, featured comedian Dane Cook as Feely on the Giants' five-hour flight home from Seattle, where he is forced to land the plane through two large radio towers that look like field goal posts.

Feely joined the CBS Sports Network in 2015 as a color analyst covering college football. Beginning in 2017, Feely also served as a color commentator for CBS' NFL telecasts, working alongside Beth Mowins, the first full-time female NFL play-by-play announcer. In 2018, he was set to be color analyst with play-by-play partner Mowins on the #8 team of NFL on CBS for Weeks 13 and 17, but he settled for sideline reporter for Weeks 10 and 17 as the #5 announcing team. He also joined neurosurgeon, CNN medical reporter and fellow Michigan alum Sanjay Gupta as a commentator on the Wolverines' TeamCast for the school's appearance in the 2018 NCAA Men's Final Four, airing on TNT. When he is not working as analyst, he is the reporter for the #4 team for the NFL on CBS. In 2021, Feely teamed up with Dedes and started on the #7 team of NFL on CBS for Week 1 while James Lofton was away; Andrew Catalon and Tiki Barber teamed up as the #6 announcing team, and Tom McCarthy and Aaron Taylor teamed up as the #5 announcing team. He and Dedes served the #6 team of NFL on CBS for the rest of the 2021 and 2022 seasons. In 2023, Feely teamed up with Tom McCarthy and Lofton to stay at the #6 team.

== 2026 U.S. House campaign ==
In April 2025, Feely told ESPN that he would run as a Republican for the U.S. House of Representatives in Arizona's 5th congressional district in 2026, seeking to succeed Andy Biggs, who is running for governor of Arizona. Upon his campaign launch, he described himself as a fiscal conservative, social conservative and "pro-business". Feely announced on December 19 that he would instead run for Arizona's 1st congressional district. Feely was endorsed by President Donald Trump in the Republican primary. He defeated Joseph Chaplik in the primary and advanced to the general election, where he will face Democratic nominee Amish Shah.

== Personal life ==
A number of Feely's family members have also been involved in sports. His grandfather, Thomas J. Feely, was a college basketball and baseball coach for St. Thomas College in Saint Paul, Minnesota, from the early 1950s to 1984. He was inducted into the N.A.I.A. National Basketball Hall of Fame both as a coach and as a player.

Feely's father, Thomas J. "T.J." Feely, is a former College of St. Thomas running back and also a tennis coach who owns the Feely Kicking School of Tampa, Florida. Feely enjoys golf and has played with the Mater Dei golf team on multiple occasions.

Feely and his wife, Rebecca, live in Gilbert, Arizona. The couple have four children, one of whom, Jace, was the kicker for the University of Colorado. Feely is also a close friend and former college teammate of Tom Brady.

In 2011, Feely became a member of School of the Legends, and contributes to the organization with instructional videos, which focus on his position as a kicker.
