= Marcell Dareus =

American football player (born 1990)

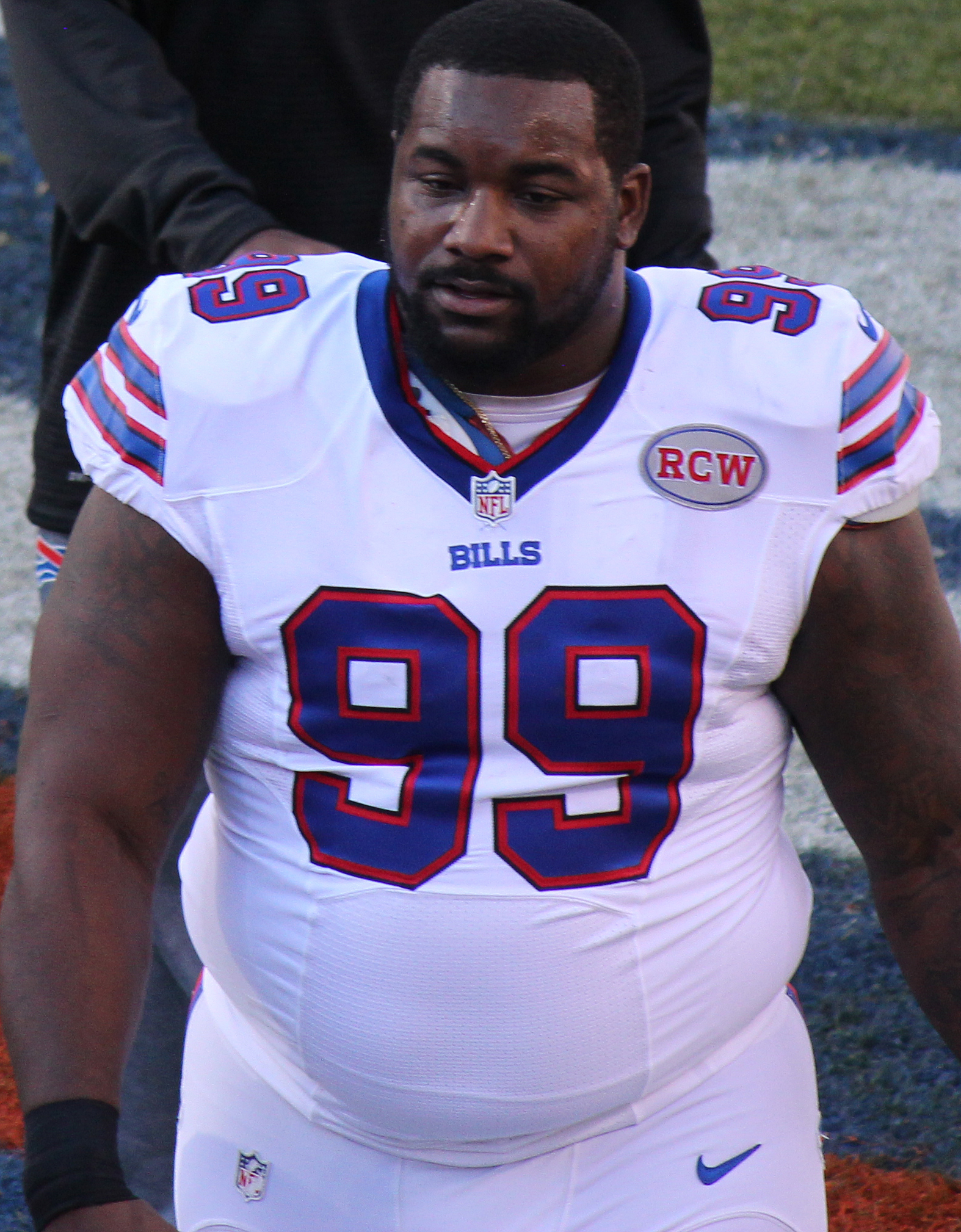
- Dareus with the Buffalo Bills in 2014

No. 99
- Position: Defensive tackle

Personal information
- Born: March 13, 1990 (age 36); Birmingham, Alabama, U.S.
- Listed height: 6 ft 3 in (1.91 m)
- Listed weight: 331 lb (150 kg)

Career information
- High school: Huffman (Birmingham)
- College: Alabama (2008–2010)
- NFL draft: 2011: 1st round, 3rd overall pick

Career history
- Buffalo Bills (2011–2017); Jacksonville Jaguars (2017–2019)

Awards and highlights
- First-team All-Pro (2014); 2× Pro Bowl (2013, 2014); PFWA All-Rookie Team (2011); BCS national champion (2010); BCS National Championship MVP (2010); Third-team All-American (2010); First-team All-SEC (2010)

Career NFL statistics
- Total tackles: 365
- Sacks: 37.5
- Forced fumbles: 3
- Fumble recoveries: 2
- Pass deflections: 15
- Stats at Pro Football Reference

Marcell Dareus (born March 13, 1990) is an American former professional football player who was a defensive tackle in the National Football League (NFL). He played college football for the Alabama Crimson Tide, where he was named defensive MVP of the 2010 BCS National Championship Game. Dareus was selected by the Buffalo Bills third overall in the 2011 NFL draft. He also played for the Jacksonville Jaguars.

== Early life ==
Dareus attended Huffman High School in Birmingham, Alabama, where he played football, basketball, and competed in track & field as a shot putter. In football, he was an ASWA All-State honorable mention at defensive lineman. He totaled 117 tackles and 20 sacks as a senior, and also returned a fumble for a touchdown. He was teammates with offensive tackle Andre Smith. Dareus was listed on the Atlanta Journal-Constitution's Super Southern 100, as well as the Mobile Press-Register Elite 18.

Dareus was considered a four-star recruit by Scout.com. He chose Alabama over offers from Auburn, Tennessee, and North Carolina, among others.

== College career ==
In his true freshman season at Alabama, Dareus played in eight games, making his debut in the Crimson Tide's season opening 34–10 victory over the Clemson Tigers. He registered four tackles while recording three quarterback hurries. Dareus saw playing time at nose tackle in third-down-and-long situations, replacing the pure run-stuffing Terrence Cody.

As a sophomore, Dareus was a significant contributor all season at defensive end for Alabama. He played in 14 games and made four starts while serving as the Crimson Tide's top pass rusher and finishing seventh in the SEC in sacks. He totaled 33 total tackles, 9.0 tackles for loss (−49), seven quarterback hurries, an interception and two pass breakups. He finished eighth in the Southeastern Conference and ranked tied for 90th nationally with 6.5 sacks (−44) or .46 per game. For his performance, including a 28-yard interception return for a touchdown, Dareus was named defensive MVP of the 2010 BCS National Championship Game.

In July 2010, Dareus was investigated by the University of Alabama in conjunction with the NCAA into whether Dareus paid his own expenses when attending a party in Miami, Florida, hosted by a sports agent, and whether the circumstances constituted an NCAA violation. In early September, the NCAA suspended him for the first two games of the season in addition to requiring him to pay back the $1,787.17 received in impermissible benefits to the charity of his choice. After the university decided to not appeal the ruling, he made his 2010 season debut against Duke in week three. For the season, he totaled 34 total tackles, 11.0 tackles for loss (−41), 4.5 quarterback sacks (−26), ten quarterback hurries, and four pass breakups. In the week following the Crimson Tide's Capital One Bowl victory over Michigan State, Dareus declared his eligibility for the 2011 NFL draft on January 7. At the time of the announcement, he was projected as a first round pick.

== Professional career ==
Pre-draft measurables
Height	Weight	Arm length	Hand span	Wingspan	40-yard dash	10-yard split	20-yard split	20-yard shuttle	Three-cone drill	Vertical jump	Broad jump	Bench press
6 ft 3 1/8 in (1.91 m)	319 lb (145 kg)	33 3/8 in (0.85 m)	10 1/8 in (0.26 m)	6 ft 7 3/8 in (2.02 m)	4.95 s	1.73 s	2.87 s	4.62 s	7.83 s	27 in (0.69 m)	8 ft 10 in (2.69 m)	24 reps
All values from NFL Combine/Pro Day

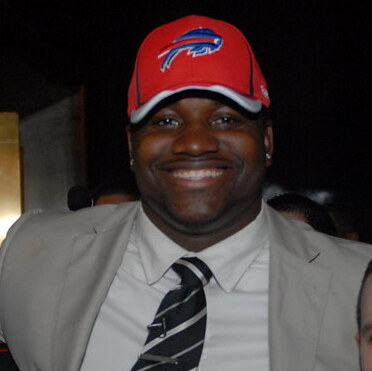
Dareus at the 2011 NFL draft

=== Buffalo Bills ===
Dareus was selected with the third overall pick in the 2011 NFL draft by the Buffalo Bills on April 28, 2011. He was the highest selected defensive lineman in Crimson Tide history, and the highest selected Alabama defensive player since linebacker Cornelius Bennett was drafted second overall by the Indianapolis Colts in 1987. On April 29, the day after the first round, the Bills announced that Dareus would wear jersey #99. On July 29, 2011, Dareus signed a four-year deal with the Bills worth $20.4 million. Dareus started all sixteen games and, despite suffering injuries to his shoulder and hand during the season, registered 5.5 sacks, the most for a Bills rookie since Aaron Schobel.

In 2011, Dareus became a member of School of the Legends (SOTL), an official partner of the NFLPA.

In 2012, Dareus was excused from the team after his younger brother was shot and killed. He finished the 2012 season with 5.5 sacks, 39 total tackles, and six passes defended in 16 games and starts.

Dareus was named to his first Pro Bowl in 2013 as an injury replacement for Justin Smith of the San Francisco 49ers. He recorded 7.5 sacks and a career high 46 tackles that season. He was ranked 62nd by his fellow players on the NFL Top 100 Players of 2014.

Despite offseason troubles, Dareus continued his success in the 2014 season. He was named AFC Defensive Player of the Week for Week 5 with three sacks and a forced fumble against Detroit. He recorded 35 tackles, with 10.0 sacks under new defensive coordinator Jim Schwartz's defense as part of Buffalo's "Cold Front" defensive line, garnering another Pro Bowl appearance and being named to the All-Pro first-team for the first time in his career. His ten sacks led all defensive tackles for that season. He was ranked 53rd by his fellow players on the NFL Top 100 Players of 2015.

On May 21, 2015, it was announced that Dareus would be suspended from the first game of the 2015 season, due to a violation of the league's substance abuse policy.

On September 10, 2015, the Bills signed Dareus to a six-year contract extension that could reach $95.1 million with incentives, the contract also included $60 million in guaranteed money. With this contract, Dareus had the most guaranteed money in the NFL for a non-quarterback. He finished the 2015 season with two sacks and 51 total tackles.

On August 16, 2016, it was reported that Dareus was facing a four-game suspension due to his second violation of the NFL's substance-abuse policy. In the 2016 season, he appeared in eight games and recorded 3.5 sacks, 39 total tackles, and one pass defended.

=== Jacksonville Jaguars ===
On October 27, 2017, Dareus was traded to the Jacksonville Jaguars for a conditional 2018 sixth-round draft pick, which became a 5th round pick that was used to select Wyatt Teller. He was reunited with head coach Doug Marrone, who was his former head coach with the Buffalo Bills. In the 2017 season, he appeared in 14 games, five with the Bills and nine with the Jaguars. He recorded 28 total tackles, three tackles-for-loss, and three quarterback hits. In the postseason, he had four combined tackles in the Wild Card Round victory over the Buffalo Bills. In the Divisional Round win over the Pittsburgh Steelers, he had one tackles and one quarterback hit. In the AFC Championship loss to the New England Patriots, he had five combined tackles and one quarterback hit.

In the 2018 season, Dareus played in and started 15 games. He recorded 32 combined tackles, two quarterback hits, one sack, one pass defensed, one forced fumble, and one safety (which came against the New York Jets in Week 4 when he tackled Isaiah Crowell in the endzone).

On October 25, 2019, Dareus was placed on injured reserve after undergoing core muscle surgery.

On February 24, 2020, the Jaguars declined the option on Dareus' contract, making him a free agent.

== Career statistics ==
=== NFL ===
Year	Team	GP	Tackles				Fumbles			Interceptions				
Year	Team	GP	Cmb	Solo	Ast	Sck	FF	FR	Yds	Int	Yds	Avg	TD	PD
2011	BUF	16	43	32	11	5.5	0	1	0	0	0	0.0	0	2
2012	BUF	16	39	26	13	5.5	0	1	0	0	0	0.0	0	6
2013	BUF	16	71	46	25	7.5	1	0	0	0	0	0.0	0	3
2014	BUF	15	48	35	13	10.0	1	0	0	0	0	0.0	0	1
2015	BUF	15	51	38	13	2.0	0	0	0	0	0	0.0	0	0
2016	BUF	8	39	24	15	3.5	0	0	0	0	0	0.0	0	1
2017	BUF	5	8	4	4	1.0	0	0	0	0	0	0.0	0	0
2017	JAX	9	21	19	2	1.0	0	0	0	0	0	0.0	0	0
2018	JAX	15	32	23	9	1.0	1	0	0	0	0	0.0	0	1
2019	JAX	6	13	8	5	0.5	0	0	0	0	0	0.0	0	1
Career		121	365	255	110	37.5	3	2	0	0	0	0.0	0	15

=== College ===
Season	Games		Tackles							Interceptions				
Season	GP	GS	Solo	Ast	Cmb	TfL	Yds	Sck	Yds	Int	Yds	BU	PD	QBH
2008	8	0	1	3	4	0.0	0	0.0	0	0	0	0	0	3
2009	14	4	19	14	33	9.0	49	6.5	44	1	28	2	3	7
2010	11	11	20	14	34	11.0	41	4.5	26	0	0	4	4	10
Career	33	15	40	31	71	20.0	90	11.0	70	1	28	6	7	20

== Personal life ==
Dareus's father is from Haiti.

In 2023 Dareus appeared on the TLC network's Dr. Pimple Popper reality television program in order to have a lipoma removed from his left eyebrow area.

=== Controversies ===
On May 5, 2014, Dareus was arrested in Cleburne County, Alabama, on charges of possession of a controlled substance and possession of drug paraphernalia .

On June 3, 2014, Dareus was arraigned in Hamburg, New York, on charges over a car accident stemming from an alleged drag race with teammate, Jerry Hughes.

On November 14, 2026, Dareus was arrested at his residence in Hoover, Alabama following a pursuit, which began after he fled a traffic stop after resisting arrest and assaulting a police officer. He was found to be in possession of marijuana.
