= Mike Sherman =

American gridiron football player and coach (born 1954)

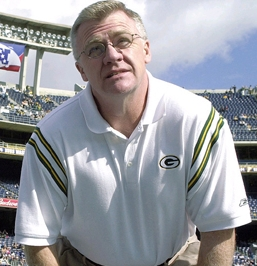
- Sherman in 2003

Personal information
- Born: December 19, 1954 (age 71); Norwood, Massachusetts, U.S.

Career information
- High school: Algonquin Regional (Northborough, Massachusetts)
- College: Central Connecticut (1974–1977)
- NFL draft: 1978: undrafted

Career history

Coaching
- Stamford HS (CT) (1978) Head coach; Worcester Academy (MA) (1979–1980) Head coach; Pittsburgh (1981–1982) Graduate assistant; Tulane (1983–1984) Offensive line coach; Holy Cross (1985–1987) Offensive line coach; Holy Cross (1988) Offensive coordinator; Texas A&M (1989–1993) Offensive line coach; UCLA (1994) Offensive line coach; Texas A&M (1995–1996) Offensive line coach; Green Bay Packers (1997–1998) Tight ends coach; Seattle Seahawks (1999) Offensive coordinator; Green Bay Packers (2000–2005) Head coach; Houston Texans (2006) Assistant head coach; Houston Texans (2007) Offensive coordinator; Texas A&M (2008–2011) Head coach; Miami Dolphins (2012–2013) Offensive coordinator; Nauset Regional HS (MA) (2015–2016) Head coach; Montreal Alouettes (2018) Head coach

Operations
- Green Bay Packers (2001–2004) General manager

Head coaching record
- Regular season: NFL: 57–39 (.594); NCAA: 25–25 (.500); CFL: 5–13 (.278)
- Postseason: NFL: 2–4 (.333); Bowl games: 0–2 (.000); CFL: 0–0 (–)
- Career: NFL: 59–43 (.578); NCAA: 25–27 (.481); CFL: 5–13 (.278)
- Coaching profile at Pro Football Reference
- Executive profile at Pro Football Reference

Michael Francis Sherman (born December 19, 1954) is an American football coach and former player. He was the head coach of the Green Bay Packers of the National Football League (NFL) from 2000 to 2005. Sherman led the Packers to five consecutive winning seasons from 2000 to 2004 and three divisional titles in 2002, 2003, and 2004, but never advanced past the divisional round of the playoffs. He was also the head football coach at Texas A&M University from 2008 to 2011. He has also been a coach in the NFL for the Seattle Seahawks, Houston Texans and Miami Dolphins. Before he started coaching in the NFL, he served as an assistant coach at five different colleges, including Texas A&M, where he coached the offensive line for seven seasons. He is one of only a few coaches that has been a head coach at the high school, college, CFL and NFL levels.

== Early life and family ==
Sherman was born in 1954 in Norwood, Massachusetts. Throughout the 1950s and 60s, Sherman spent his life in Hyde Park, Massachusetts, the southernmost neighborhood in Boston. He lived there with his parents, Claire and Frank Sherman, his two sisters, and his two brothers. His extended family members, who lived nearby, were devout Green Bay Packers fans and have dutifully followed Sherman's career. Sherman was also raised in Northborough, Massachusetts, where he attended Algonquin Regional High School, playing for the football team.

Sherman earned a scholarship to play at Central Connecticut State University, where he played defensive end and offensive tackle. He majored in English. Though he was considered to be an average player with limited abilities in college, he was noted for his strong commitment. Right after college, Sherman became an English teacher and an assistant football coach, serving at Stamford High School in Connecticut in 1978 and at Worcester Academy in Massachusetts from 1979 to 1980.

Sherman's father worked for a pipe company in New England and retired in 1991. Both his parents lived on Cape Cod. Sherman has been married to his wife Karen since 1982, and the couple have five children together (Sarah, Emily, Matthew, Benjamin and Selena). Sherman is the father-in-law of Cincinnati Bengals head coach Zac Taylor, who is married to his oldest daughter.

Sherman and his family reside on Cape Cod. A former reading and special education teacher, Karen is a very active member of the West Dennis Library Board of Trustees.

== Coaching career ==
=== Early career ===
Sherman started his college coaching career as a graduate assistant at the University of Pittsburgh, where he was part of Jackie Sherrill's staff from 1981 to 1982. While at Pittsburgh, Sherman wasn't able to afford an apartment; instead, he slept on a cot in Pitt Stadium. After his stay at Pittsburgh, Sherman then coached the offensive line at Tulane from 1983 to 1984, and later moved to Holy Cross, where he coached the offensive line from 1985 to 1987 before becoming the offensive coordinator for the 1988 season.

From 1989 to 1993, Sherman coached the Texas A&M offensive line. During the 1992–93 season, he met retired head coach Gary Kubiak, who had coached the A&M running backs. In 1994, Sherman left Texas A&M to coach the UCLA offensive line, which included former Baltimore Ravens pro bowler Jonathan Ogden. Sherman later returned to Texas A&M to coach the offensive line again for the 1995–96 seasons. Under Sherman, the Aggie offense averaged over 400 yards of total offense four times in his seven seasons at A&M. The 1990 Aggie team set a school record of 471.1 yards per game. Sherman also helped the Aggies to win three Southwest Conference championships consecutively from 1991 to 1993. Additionally, he recruited Leeland McElroy, who would become one of the Aggies' top 10 all-time leading running backs.

On December 20, 1996, A&M head coach R. C. Slocum promoted Sherman to offensive coordinator to replace dismissed Steve Ensminger. Months later, Sherman resigned to start his professional coaching career as the assistant offensive line and tight ends coach for the Green Bay Packers. When asked by a reporter why he chose to accept the Green Bay job, Sherman responded: "There is absolutely no other college job I would have left Texas A&M for and only one professional job that I've ever had any interest in and that being the Green Bay Packers. I've enjoyed the small-town atmosphere of College Station for my family, and Green Bay offers that same atmosphere. If the truth be told, there is not a whole lot of difference between an `Aggie' and a `Cheesehead." He served the position for the 1997–98 seasons. After Packers head coach Mike Holmgren resigned to accept the Seattle Seahawks head coach position, Holmgren hired Sherman to become the offensive coordinator for the 1999 season.

=== Green Bay Packers ===
In 2000, Sherman became the head coach of the Green Bay Packers. He led the Packers to five consecutive winning seasons from 2000 to 2004. From 2002 to 2004, he led the Packers to three consecutive NFC North Division titles. From 2000 to 2004, he compiled a 53–27 record, and a .663 winning percentage, which was the second highest in Packers history, trailing that of Vince Lombardi's, who is one of the most successful coaches in the history of football. Additionally, Green Bay and the Philadelphia Eagles were the only two teams to make the playoffs for four consecutive seasons from 2001 to 2004.

An offensive-minded coach, Sherman led the Packers to break franchise records for rushing in 2003 and passing in 2004. In 2003, Packers quarterback Brett Favre led the NFL in touchdown passes, in addition to setting a franchise record for rushing yardage. The 2003 team also gained a total of 442 points, which is the fourth most in franchise history (560 in 2011, 461 in 2009, 456 in 1996, when the team won the Super Bowl).

Despite receiving a contract extension earlier in the 2005 season, Sherman was fired by the Packers on January 2, 2006, after compiling a 4–12 record — Green Bay's first losing record since the 1991 season (it was also Sherman's only losing season during his Packers tenure). The Packers had lost pro bowlers Javon Walker, Bubba Franks and Ahman Green to injured reserve early in the season.

In his six-year head coaching career with the Packers from 2000 to 2005, Sherman compiled a 57–39 regular season record and a 2–4 postseason record. Sherman used the West Coast offense at Green Bay.

==== General manager ====
Sherman succeeded Ron Wolf as general manager (GM) of the Packers in 2001, taking on the dual role of head coach and general manager. Although the promotion of Sherman to GM was made prior to the 2001 NFL draft, Wolf handled the draft duty in 2001. Sherman brought in three of the core players that were on the Packers 2010 roster. He drafted Nick Barnett, Scott Wells, and acquired Cullen Jenkins as a rookie free agent after the 2003 draft.

Sherman's first solo draft pick as GM and in charge of the draft was Javon Walker in 2002, who made the Pro Bowl in 2004, and was traded to the Denver Broncos in 2006.

In 2005 the Packers hired Ted Thompson from the Seattle Seahawks to take over Sherman's general manager duties, although Sherman remained the Packers' head coach for one more season.

=== Houston Texans ===
The Houston Texans hired Sherman as the assistant head coach/offense coach on February 15, 2006. On January 17, 2007, he was promoted to offensive coordinator following the departure of Troy Calhoun, who left the Texans to take the head coaching job at Air Force, and Sherman retained his role as assistant head coach. In the 2006 season, the Texans' regular season offense ranked 28th out of 32 NFL teams. In the 2007 season, Sherman's first year as the offensive coordinator, the Texans' regular season offense improved to a ranking of 14.

The Texans finished the 2006 season with a 6–10 record. In 2007, they finished with an 8–8 record.

=== Texas A&M Aggies ===
Sherman became the head coach of the Texas A&M football team in November 2007. He signed a seven-year contract that at the time paid him $1.8 million annually. Sherman abandoned the zone read option offense run by former A&M coach Dennis Franchione, and installed a pro-style offense similar to those used in the NFL. He uses a balanced offense run primarily out of pro-style formations.

After two straight losing seasons, the Aggies started the 2010 season 3–3 but won their final six games to finish 9–3 and earn a share of the Big 12 South Division title. After the 2010 season, he signed a contract extension through the 2015 season. His salary was raised to $2.2 million.

In 2011, the Aggies began as a top 10 ranked team, but fell out of the polls after losing four games, three of which had double-digit half-time leads. Three of those four losses were to teams later ranked among the top ten in the nation. On November 19, 2011, the Aggies defeated Kansas by a score of 61–7 and became bowl-eligible for a third straight season. Five days later, on November 24, 2011, they would lose at home to the University of Texas 27–25 on a last-second field goal, in what would likely be the last game of the rivalry. It was the Aggies' sixth loss of the season, and the fifth in which they held a second-half lead of two or more scores.

=== Miami Dolphins ===
The Dolphins hired Sherman as offensive coordinator on January 27, 2012.

On April 27, 2012, the Dolphins drafted Ryan Tannehill with the 8th overall pick. Sherman coached Tannehill at Texas A&M and was instrumental in the decision-making leading to the Dolphins selecting Tannehill.

=== Nauset Regional High School ===
In May 2015, Nauset Regional High School announced Sherman would take over as head football coach following the resignation of coach Keith Kenyon, who became the new assistant principal. After compiling a 4–18 record over two seasons, Sherman resigned in May 2017.

=== Your Call Football ===
In November 2017, it was announced that Sherman had joined Your Call Football, a new platform in which fans call plays in real-time in real, live games. Prior to the season, Sherman was hired by the CFL's Montreal Alouettes. He would still serve as the head coach during Your Call Football's inaugural season.

=== Montreal Alouettes ===
On December 20, 2017, Sherman was hired by the Montreal Alouettes as head coach. During the 2018 CFL season, Sherman, along with June Jones and Marc Trestman had the distinction of having both CFL and NFL head coaching experience to coach in the same season. He finished with a 5–13 record in his first full season with the Alouettes.

On June 8, 2019, shortly before the start of the regular season and a week after the Alouettes ownership surrendered the franchise back to the CFL, the Alouettes released an ambiguously worded statement claiming that they and Sherman had "agreed to part ways."

== Head coaching record ==
=== NFL ===
| Team | Year | Regular season | | | | | Postseason | | | |
| Team | Year | Won | Lost | Ties | Win % | Finish | Won | Lost | Win % | Result |
|---|---|---|---|---|---|---|---|---|---|---|
| GB | 2000 | 9 | 7 | 0 | .563 | 3rd in NFC Central | – | – | – | – |
| GB | 2001 | 12 | 4 | 0 | .750 | 2nd in NFC Central | 1 | 1 | .500 | Lost to St. Louis Rams in NFC Divisional Game |
| GB | 2002 | 12 | 4 | 0 | .750 | 1st in NFC North | 0 | 1 | .000 | Lost to Atlanta Falcons in NFC Wild Card Game |
| GB | 2003 | 10 | 6 | 0 | .625 | 1st in NFC North | 1 | 1 | .500 | Lost to Philadelphia Eagles in NFC Divisional Game |
| GB | 2004 | 10 | 6 | 0 | .625 | 1st in NFC North | 0 | 1 | .000 | Lost to Minnesota Vikings in NFC Wild Card Game |
| GB | 2005 | 4 | 12 | 0 | .250 | 4th in NFC North | – | – | – | – |
| Total | | 57 | 39 | 0 | .594 | | | | | |

=== College ===
| Year | Team | Overall | Conference | Standing | Bowl/playoffs | Coaches^{#} | AP^{°} |
|---|---|---|---|---|---|---|---|
Texas A&M Aggies (Big 12 Conference) (2008–2011)
| 2008 | Texas A&M | 4–8 | 2–6 | T–5th (South) | | | |
| 2009 | Texas A&M | 6–7 | 3–5 | 5th (South) | L Independence | | |
| 2010 | Texas A&M | 9–4 | 6–2 | T–1st (South) | L Cotton | 21 | 19 |
| 2011 | Texas A&M | 6–6 (Note: Sherman was fired at the end of regular season and replaced with Tim DeRuyter as interim head coach. DeRuyter led the Aggies to a win in the 2011 Meineke Car Care Bowl of Texas. Texas A&M finished the season with an overall record of 7–6) | 4–5 | T–6th | | | |
| Texas A&M: | | 25–25 | 15–18 | | | | |
| Total: | | 25–25 | | | | | |
National championship Conference title Conference division title or championship game berth
^{#}Rankings from final Coaches Poll.; ^{°}Rankings from final AP Poll.

=== High school ===
| Year | Team | Won | Lost | Tied | Win % | Ref |
|---|---|---|---|---|---|---|
| 2015 | Nauset Regional High School | 1 | 10 | 0 | .091 | |
| 2016 | Nauset Regional High School | 3 | 8 | 0 | .278 | |

=== CFL ===
| Team | Year | Regular season | | | | | Postseason | | |
| Team | Year | Won | Lost | Ties | Win % | Finish | Won | Lost | Result |
|---|---|---|---|---|---|---|---|---|---|
| MTL | 2018 | 5 | 13 | 0 | .278 | 3rd in East | – | – | Missed playoffs |
| Total | | 5 | 13 | 0 | .278 | 0 Division; Championships | 0 | 0 | 0 Grey Cups |

== Coaching tree ==
Sherman has worked under nine head coaches:

- Jackie Sherrill, Pittsburgh (graduate assistant 1981-82)
- Wally English, Tulane (offensive line coach 1983-84)
- Rick E. Carter and Mark Duffner, Holy Cross (offensive line coach 1985-87, offensive coordinator 1988)
- R.C. Slocum, Texas A&M (offensive line coach 1989-93, 1995-96, offensive coordinator 1996-97)
- Terry Donahue, UCLA, (offensive line coach 1995)
- Mike Holmgren, Green Bay Packers (tight ends coach 1997-98), Seattle Seahawks (offensive coordinator 1999)
- Gary Kubiak, Houston Texans (offensive coordinator 2007)
- Joe Philbin, Miami Dolphins (offensive coordinator 2012-2013)

Nine of Sherman's assistant coaches became head coaches in the NFL or NCAA:

- Sylvester Croom, Mississippi State (2004-2008)
- Jeff Jagodzinski, Boston College (2007-2008)
- Trent Miles, Indiana State (2008-2012), Georgia State (2013-2016)
- Bo Pelini, Nebraska (2008-2014), Youngstown State (2015-2019)
- James Franklin, Vanderbilt (2011-2013), Penn State (2014-2025)
- Tim DeRuyter, Fresno State (2012-2016)
- John Bonamego, Central Michigan (2015-2018)
- Charlie Jackson, Kentucky State (2019-2021)
- Stan Drayton, Temple (2022-2024)
