= Tim DeRuyter =

American football player and coach (born 1963)

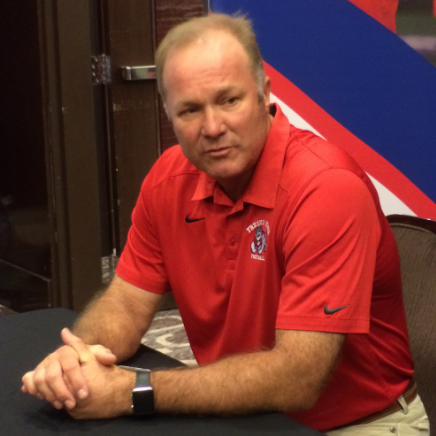
- DeRuyter at 2016 Mountain West Media Days

Current position
- Title: Assistant Head Coach for Defense
- Team: Kansas State
- Conference: Big 12

Biographical details
- Born: January 3, 1963 (age 63); Long Beach, California, U.S.

Playing career
- 1982–1984: Air Force
- Position: Outside linebacker

Coaching career (HC unless noted)
- 1985: Air Force (GA)
- 1989–1992: Air Force (Def. Asst.)
- 1995–1998: Ohio (DC/DB)
- 1999–2000: Navy (DC)
- 2001: Navy (DB)
- 2002–2004: Ohio (DC/DB)
- 2005–2006: Nevada (co-DC/S)
- 2007: Air Force (DC/S)
- 2008–2009: Air Force (AHC/DC/S)
- 2010–2011: Texas A&M (AHC/DC)
- 2011: Texas A&M (interim HC)
- 2012–2016: Fresno State
- 2017: California (DC/ILB)
- 2018–2019: California (DC/OLB)
- 2020: California (AHC/co-DC/OLB)
- 2021: Oregon (DC/OLB)
- 2022–2024: Texas Tech (DC)
- 2026–present: Kansas State (AHC)

Head coaching record
- Overall: 31–30
- Bowls: 1–3

Accomplishments and honors

Championships
- 2 Mountain West (2012–2013); 2 Mountain West West Division (2013–2014)

Timothy James DeRuyter (/dəˈruːtər/ də-ROO-tər; born January 3, 1963) is an American football coach and former player who is the assistant head coach for defense at Kansas State University. He has served as defensive coordinator at such schools as Texas Tech University, the University of Oregon, the University of California, Berkeley, and Texas A&M University. DeRuyter was head coach at California State University, Fresno from 2012 to 2016.

== Early years ==
A native of Long Beach, California, DeRuyter attended St. John Bosco High School in Bellflower and graduated in 1981. He played college football at Air Force from 1982 to 1984. He lettered at outside linebacker and was part of three bowl game victories. He graduated from the United States Air Force Academy in 1985. His family is of Dutch descent.

== Coaching career ==
=== Early coaching career ===
DeRuyter has a history of turning college football defenses around. Before his second arrival at Ohio in 2002, the Bobcats ranked 99th nationally; upon his departure to Nevada, the Bobcats ranked 22nd. At Nevada, the Wolfpack improved from 78th to 48th under his tutelage. He also spent time at Navy.

=== Air Force ===
As the defensive coordinator at Air Force from 2007 to 2009, DeRuyter replaced a bend-but-don't-break scheme with an aggressive 3–4 defense. In 2006, prior to his arrival, the Falcons ranked 78th in scoring defense and 78th in total defense. In 2009, the Falcons finished 10th in scoring defense and 11th in total defense. In the 2009 Armed Forces Bowl 47-20 win against Houston, the Falcons limited the nation's second-ranked passing offense to a season-low of 222 passing yards. They also recorded six interceptions.

=== Texas A&M ===
DeRuyter became Texas A&M's defensive coordinator in 2010. The Aggies ranked 104th in scoring defense in 2009, under a 4–3 defense. In 2010, under his 3–4 defense, they improved to 21st in scoring defense. After Texas A&M fired head coach Mike Sherman in 2011, DeRuyter became the interim head coach for the Meineke Car Care Bowl, leading the Aggies to a 33–22 victory over Northwestern.

=== Fresno State ===
DeRuyter became the head coach of the Fresno State Bulldogs beginning the 2012 season. During the 2012 season, the Bulldogs team included standouts Derek Carr, Phillip Thomas, and Davante Adams. The Bulldogs were Mountain West conference champions after recording 7–1 conference records during the 2012 and 2013 seasons. During the 2014 season, they were conference division champions after posting a 5–3 conference record. His 2015 and 2016 teams did not see the same success, as both teams posted losing records. He was fired by Fresno State on October 23, 2016, after starting the season 1–7 and 4–16 since playing in the Mountain West championship game in 2014. During his tenure, the Bulldogs were invited to three bowl games, but lost all three by at least 20 points each.

DeRuyter's Fresno State tenure is most remembered for his unwillingness to offer a scholarship to Josh Allen, who grew up a lifelong Bulldogs fan. Allen would go on to have a prolific college career at the University of Wyoming and become the seventh overall pick in the 2018 NFL draft.

=== Cal ===
On January 23, 2017, DeRuyter was hired to be defensive coordinator at Cal. Prior to his arrival, Cal's defense ranked 127th in scoring defense and 125th in total defense in 2016. The defense improved over his tenure; over the 2017–2020 seasons, Cal's scoring defense ranked 79th, 22nd, 33rd, and 48th, respectively. The total defense ranked 95th, 15th, 65th, and 38th. The 2019 Cal defense featured All-American Evan Weaver, who led the nation in tackles. During his tenure at Cal, DeRuyter was the primary defensive coordinator from 2017 to 2019, but shared the responsibility with Peter Sirmon in 2020. For their coaching during the 2019 season, DeRuyter and Sirmon were named Linebackers Coaches of the Year by FootballScoop.

=== Oregon ===
On January 22, 2021, DeRuyter was hired to be the defensive coordinator at Oregon.

=== Texas Tech ===
On December 8, 2021, DeRuyter was hired to be the defensive coordinator and linebackers coach at Texas Tech University under head coach Joey McGuire. Texas Tech fired DeRuyter following the 2024 season after the team finished the regular season ranked 125th in total defense (out of 134 FBS teams) and 133rd against the pass.

== Head coaching record ==
Year	Team	Overall	Conference	Standing	Bowl/playoffs
Texas A&M Aggies (Big 12 Conference) (2011)
2011	Texas A&M	1–0 (Note: DeRuyter served as interim head coach after Mike Sherman was fired at the end of regular season. Texas A&M finished the season with an overall record of 7–6)			W Meineke Car Care
Texas A&M:		1–0			
Fresno State Bulldogs (Mountain West Conference) (2012–2016)
2012	Fresno State	9–4	7–1	T–1st	L Hawaii
2013	Fresno State	11–2	7–1	1st (West)	L Las Vegas
2014	Fresno State	6–8	5–3	T–1st (West)	L Hawaii
2015	Fresno State	3–9	2–6	T–4th(West)	
2016	Fresno State	1–7 (Note: DeRuyter was fired on October 23, 2016 and replaced with interim head coach Eric Kiesau. Fresno State finished the season with an overall record of 1–11 and a conference mark of 0–8, placing sixth in the West Division of the Mountain West Conference.)	0–4	(West)	
Fresno State:		30–30	21–15		
Total:		31–30			
National championship Conference title Conference division title or championship game berth
^{#}Rankings from final Coaches Poll.; ^{°}Rankings from final AP Poll.
