= School of the Legends =

School of the Legends, LLC (School of the Legends, SOTL or SOTLNFL) was founded in August 2009 as a private online community for current and former NFL athletes. The company is based in Nashville, Tennessee. SOTL is the Official Social Network and Training Partner of NFL Players, the marketing arm of the National Football League Players Association.

== History ==
In January 2010, SOTL presented a plan of partnership to the NFLPA in Washington, DC and in June 2010, SOTL became an officially licensed partner. SOTL has filmed training classes with current and former NFL players, as well as organized live interviews with players. As part of their football training system, "Legends in Training," the organization administers courses taught by NFL players such as Michael Vick, Jerome Bettis, and Larry Fitzgerald.

In September 2010 SOTL partnered with the NFLPA, Teamsters, and Feed the Children in New Orleans to assist 800 families affected by the destruction of Hurricane Katrina. SOTL is also an official partner of American Youth Football and Manning Passing Academy.

An updated version of SchooloftheLegends.com (now inactive) launched in September 2011 along with mobile and iPad applications.

December 2011, SOTL shot TV ad campaigns which featured Barry Sanders, Deion Sanders, Ray Lewis, Jerome Bettis, Chris Johnson and Cortland Finnegan.

School of the Legends has been dissolved and various assets incorporated into other ventures.

== Members ==
The SOTL roster consists of thousands of participating players, also referred to as “Legends” within the organization. This number has grown from 500 registered NFL players in 2009 to 2,800 players today. Some of the professional athletes associated with SOTL are listed below:

- Michael Vick
- Jerome Bettis
- DeMaurice Smith: Executive Director of the NFLPA
- Ray Rice
- Tony Gonzalez
- Larry Fitzgerald
- DeAngelo Williams
- Cortland Finnegan
- Jason Carthen
- Deion Sanders
- Ray Lewis
- Chris Johnson
- Barry Sanders
- Marcell Dareus
- A. J. Green
