= 2011 Northwestern Wildcats football team =

American college football season

2011 Northwestern Wildcats football

Meineke Car Care Bowl of Texas, L 22–33 vs. Texas A&M
- Conference: Big Ten Conference
- Legends Division
- Record: 6–7 (3–5 Big Ten)
- Head coach: Pat Fitzgerald (6th season)
- Offensive coordinator: Mick McCall (4th season)
- Offensive scheme: Spread
- Defensive coordinator: Mike Hankwitz (4th season)
- Base defense: Multiple 4–3
- Captains: Jordan Mabin; Al Netter; Dan Persa; Brian Peters
- Home stadium: Ryan Field

2011 Big Ten Conference football standings
	Conf.			Overall
Team	W		L	W		L
Legends Division
No. 11 Michigan State x	7	–	1	11	–	3
No. 12 Michigan %	6	–	2	11	–	2
No. 24 Nebraska	5	–	3	9	–	4
Iowa	4	–	4	7	–	6
Northwestern	3	–	5	6	–	7
Minnesota	2	–	6	3	–	9
Leaders Division
No. 10 Wisconsin xy$	6	–	2	11	–	3
Penn State x	6	–	2	9	–	4
Purdue	4	–	4	7	–	6
Ohio State	3	–	5	6	–	7
Illinois	2	–	6	7	–	6
Indiana	0	–	8	1	–	11
Championship: Wisconsin 42, Michigan State 39
$ – BCS representative as conference champion; % – BCS at-large representative; x – Division champion/co-champions; y – Championship game participant; Rankings from AP Poll

The 2011 Northwestern Wildcats football team represented Northwestern University during the 2011 NCAA Division I FBS football season. Pat Fitzgerald, in his sixth season at Northwestern, was the team's head coach. The Wildcats home games were played at Ryan Field in Evanston, Illinois. They are members of the Legends Division of the Big Ten Conference. They finished the season 6–7, 3–4 in Big Ten play to finish in fifth place in the Legends Division. They were invited to the Meineke Car Care Bowl of Texas where they were defeated by Texas A&M 22–33.

== Preseason ==
=== Conference divisions ===
Starting in 2011, the Big Ten Conference created two divisions, "Legends" and "Leaders", following the University of Nebraska's membership into the conference. Northwestern was placed in the "Legends" division, with the University of Iowa, the University of Michigan, Michigan State University, the University of Minnesota and the University of Nebraska joining them.

== Schedule ==
The schedule is as follows:

Date	Time	Opponent	Site	TV	Result	Attendance
September 3	11:00 am	at Boston College*	Alumni Stadium; Chestnut Hill, Massachusetts	ESPNU	W 24–17	37,561
September 10	2:30 pm	Eastern Illinois*	Ryan Field; Evanston, Illinois	BTN	W 42–21	28,042
September 17	2:30 pm	at Army*	Michie Stadium; West Point, New York	CBSSN	L 14–21	35,784
October 1	11:00 am	at No. 22 Illinois	Memorial Stadium; Champaign, Illinois (Land of Lincoln Trophy)	ESPN2	L 35–38	53,243
October 8	6:00 pm	No. 11 Michigan	Ryan Field; Evanston, Illinois (rivalry)	BTN	L 24–42	47,330
October 15	6:00 pm	at Iowa	Kinnick Stadium; Iowa City, Iowa	BTN	L 31–41	70,585
October 22	6:00 pm	No. 22 Penn State^{†}	Ryan Field; Evanston, Illinois	BTN	L 24–34	40,004
October 29	11:00 am	at Indiana	Memorial Stadium; Bloomington, Indiana	BTN	W 59–38	39,239
November 5	2:30 pm	at No. 9 Nebraska	Memorial Stadium; Lincoln, Nebraska	BTN	W 28–25	85,115
November 12	11:00 am	Rice*	Ryan Field; Evanston, Illinois	BTN	W 28–6	26,886
November 19	11:00 am	Minnesota	Ryan Field; Evanston, Illinois	BTN	W 28–13	26,215
November 26	11:00 am	No. 10 Michigan State	Ryan Field; Evanston, Illinois	BTN	L 17–31	32,172
December 31	11:00 am	Texas A&M*	Reliant Stadium; Houston, Texas (Meineke Car Care Bowl of Texas)	ESPN	L 22–33	68,395
*Non-conference game; ^{†}Homecoming; Rankings from AP Poll released prior to the game; All times are in Central time

== Regular season ==
=== Boston College ===
Team	1	2	3	4	Total
• Northwestern	3	7	7	7	24
Boston College	3	7	0	7	17

- Date: September 3
- Location: Alumni Stadium, Chestnut Hill, Massachusetts
- Game start: 11:00 a.m. CDT
- Elapsed time: 3:25
- Game attendance: 37,561
- Referee: Dave Witvoet
- TV announcers (ESPNU): Rob Stone (Play-by-play) & Danny Kanell (Color)

Scoring summary
1	12:49	BC	Nate Freese 19-yard field goal	BC 3–0
1	7:01	NW	Jeff Budzien 43-yard field goal	Tied 3–3
2	8:03	BC	Andre Williams 6-yard run (Nate Freese kick)	BC 10–3
2	0:38	NW	Kain Colter 3-yard run (Jeff Budzien kick)	Tied 10–10
3	11:53	NW	Mike Trumpy 5-yard run (Jeff Budzien kick)	NW 17–10
4	9:24	NW	Adonis Smith 1-yard run (Jeff Budzien kick)	NW 24–10
4	6:00	BC	Andre Williams 1-yard run (Nate Freese kick)	NW 24–17

=== Eastern Illinois ===
Team	1	2	3	4	Total
Eastern Illinois	0	7	7	7	21
• Northwestern	14	14	7	7	42

- Date: September 10
- Location: Ryan Field, Evanston, Illinois
- Game start: 2:30 p.m. CDT
- Elapsed time: 3:03
- Game attendance: 28,042
- Referee: Bill LeMonnier
- TV announcers (BTN): Matt Devlin (Play-by-play), Glen Mason (Color) & Rhett Kleinschmidt (Sideline)

=== Army ===
Team	1	2	3	4	Total
Northwestern	0	7	0	7	14
• Army	7	0	7	7	21

- Date: September 17
- Location: Michie Stadium, West Point, New York
- Game start: 2:30 p.m. CST
- Elapsed time: 3:03
- Game attendance: 35,784
- Referee: Ron Cherry
- TV announcers (CBSSN): Gary Thorne (Play-by-play) & Randy Cross (Color)

=== Illinois ===
Team	1	2	3	4	Total
Northwestern	0	14	14	7	35
• Illinois	7	3	7	21	38

- Date: October 1
- Location: Memorial Stadium, Champaign, Illinois
- Game start: 11:00 a.m. CDT
- Elapsed time: 3:16
- Game attendance: 53,243
- Referee: John O'Neill
- TV announcers (ESPN2): Beth Mowins (Play-by-play) & Mike Bellotti (Color)

=== Michigan ===
Team	1	2	3	4	Total
• Michigan	7	7	14	14	42
Northwestern	14	10	0	0	24

- Date: October 8
- Location: Ryan Field, Evanston, Illinois
- Game start: 6:00 p.m. CDT
- Elapsed time: 3:16
- Game attendance: 47,330
- Referee: Scott McElwee
- TV announcers (BTN): Tom Hart (Play-by-play), Derek Rackley (Color) & Lisa Byington (Sideline)

=== Iowa ===
Team	1	2	3	4	Total
Northwestern	0	7	10	14	31
• Iowa	10	7	0	24	41

- Date: October 15
- Location: Kinnick Stadium, Iowa City, Iowa
- Game start: 6:00 p.m. CDT
- Elapsed time: 3:10
- Game attendance: 70,585
- Referee: Dennis Lipski
- TV announcers (BTN): Eric Collins (Play-by-play), Chris Martin (Color) & Dionne Miller (Sideline)

=== Penn State ===
Team	1	2	3	4	Total
• Penn State	14	13	7	0	34
Northwestern	14	10	0	0	24

- Date: October 22
- Location: Ryan Field, Evanston, Illinois
- Game start: 6:00 p.m. CDT
- Elapsed time: 3:15
- Game attendance: 40,004
- Referee: Bill LeMonnier
- TV announcers (BTN): Tom Hart (Play-by-play), Derek Rackley (Color) & Lisa Byington (Sideline)

=== Indiana ===
Team	1	2	3	4	Total
• Northwestern	17	21	14	7	59
Indiana	7	14	10	7	38

- Date: October 29
- Location: Memorial Stadium, Bloomington, Indiana
- Game start: 11:00 a.m. CDT
- Elapsed time: 3:14
- Game attendance: 39,239
- Referee: John O'Neill
- TV announcers (BTN): Tom Hart (Play-by-play), Derek Rackley (Color) & Lisa Byington (Sideline)

=== Nebraska ===
Team	1	2	3	4	Total
• Northwestern	7	0	7	14	28
Nebraska	0	3	7	15	25

- Date: November 5
- Location: Memorial Stadium, Lincoln, Nebraska
- Game start: 2:30 p.m. CDT
- Elapsed time: 3:15
- Game attendance: 85,115
- Referee: Dave Witvoet
- TV announcers (BTN): Eric Collins (Play-by-play), Chris Martin (Color) & Dionne Miller (Sideline)

Scoring summary
1	2:08	NW	Jacob Schmidt 2-yard run (Jeff Budzien kick)	NW 7–0
2	2:26	NEB	Brett Maher 36-yard field goal	NW 7–3
3	12:13	NW	Kain Colter 3-yard run (Jeff Budzien kick)	NW 14–3
3	3:52	NEB	Tim Marlowe 15-yard pass from Taylor Martinez (Brett Maher kick)	NW 14–10
4	12:16	NW	Jeremy Ebert 81-yard pass from Kain Colter (Jeff Budzien kick)	NW 21–10
4	8:55	NEB	Rex Burkhead 1-yard run (Taylor Martinez run)	NW 21–18
4	1:34	NW	Kain Colter 1-yard run (Jeff Budzien kick)	NW 28–18
4	0:18	NEB	Kenny Bell 18-yard pass from Taylor Martinez (Brett Maher kick)	NW 28–25

=== Rice ===
Team	1	2	3	4	Total
Rice	0	0	0	6	6
• Northwestern	7	14	0	7	28

- Date: November 12
- Location: Ryan Field, Evanston, Illinois
- Game start: 11:00 a.m. CST
- Elapsed time: 2:56
- Game attendance: 26,886
- Referee: Steve LaMantia
- TV announcers (BTN): Matt Devlin (Play-by-play), Glen Mason (Color) & Jon Jansen (Sideline)

=== Minnesota ===
Team	1	2	3	4	Total
Minnesota	7	3	0	3	13
• Northwestern	21	0	0	7	28

- Date: November 19
- Location: Ryan Field, Evanston, Illinois
- Game start: 11:00 a.m. CST
- Elapsed time: 2:59
- Game attendance: 26,215
- Referee: Scott McElwee
- TV announcers (BTN): Wayne Larrivee (Play-by-play), Glen Mason (Color) & Jon Jansen (Sideline)

=== Michigan State ===
Team	1	2	3	4	Total
• Michigan State	3	14	7	7	31
Northwestern	0	3	7	7	17

- Date: November 26
- Location: Ryan Field, Evanston, Illinois
- Game start: 11:00 a.m. CST
- Elapsed time: 3:02
- Game attendance: 32,172
- Referee: Dan Capron
- TV announcers (BTN): Eric Collins (Play-by-play), Chris Martin (Color) & Dionne Miller (Sideline)

== Meineke Car Care Bowl of Texas ==
=== Texas A&M ===
Team	1	2	3	4	Total
• Texas A&M	3	17	10	3	33
Northwestern	0	7	0	15	22

- Date: December 31
- Location: Reliant Stadium, Houston, Texas
- Game start: 11:00 a.m. CST
- Elapsed time: 3:19
- Game attendance: 68,395
- Referee: Matt Loeffler
- TV announcers (ESPN): Bob Wischusen (Play-by-play), Brian Griese (Color) & Eamon McAnaney (Sideline)

== Rankings ==
Ranking movements Legend: ██ Increase in ranking ██ Decrease in ranking — = Not ranked RV = Received votes
	Week															
Poll	Pre	1	2	3	4	5	6	7	8	9	10	11	12	13	14	Final
AP	RV	RV	RV	—	—	—	—	—	—	—	—	—	—	—	—	—
Coaches	RV	RV	RV	RV	RV	—	—	—	—	—	—	—	—	—	—	—
Harris	Not released						—	—	—	—	—	—	—	—	—	Not released
BCS	Not released							—	—	—	—	—	—	—	—	Not released

== Roster ==
2011 Northwestern Wildcats roster
Quarterbacks: 2 Kain Colter – Sophomore; 7 Dan Persa (C) – Senior; 10 Zack Oliver – Freshman; 13 Trevor Siemian – (redshirt) Freshman; 15 P.J. Carollo – Freshman; 18 Evan Watkins – Sophomore; Running backs: 4 Adonis Smith – Sophomore; 21 Jordan Perkins – Freshman; 22 Treyvon Green – Freshman; 28 Tim Hanrahan – (redshirt) Freshman; 29 Mike Trumpy – Sophomore; 34 Tyris Jones – Junior; 39 Jacob Schmidt – Senior; Wide receivers: 5 Venric Mark – Sophomore; 6 Charles Brown – Senior; 8 Demetrius Fields – Junior; 11 Jeremy Ebert – Senior; 12 Tony Jones – Sophomore; 14 Christian Jones – Freshman; 17 Rashad Lawrence – Sophomore; 23 E.J. Webb – Freshman; 27 Cermak Bland – Freshman; 80 Mike Jensen – Sophomore; 81 Cameron Dickerson – Freshman; 84 Drew Moulton – Sophomore; 86 Brendan Barber – Junior; 88 Torin Dupper – (redshirt) Freshman; 89 Pierre Youngblood-Ary – Freshman; Superbacks: 9 Drake Dunsmore – Senior; 40 Brett Nagel – Junior; 82 John Plasencia – Sophomore; 83 Jack Konopka – Freshman; 85 Mark Szott – Freshman	Offensive line: 53 Geoff Mogus – Freshman; 57 Matt Frazier – Freshman; 61 Alex Pietrzak – Freshman; 62 Taylor Paxton – Sophomore; 64 Doug Bartels – Senior; 65 Ben Burkett – Senior; 66 Brandon Vitabile – (redshirt) Freshman; 68 Hayden Baker – (redshirt) Freshman; 70 Patrick Ward – Junior; 71 Shane Mertz – Freshman; 72 Brian Mulroe – Junior; 73 Colin Armstrong – Senior; 74 Chuck Porcelli – Junior; 75 Al Netter (C) – Senior; 76 Brian Smith – Sophomore; 78 Paul Jorgensen – (redshirt) Freshman; 79 Neal Deiters – Junior; Defensive line: 42 Kevin Watt – Senior; 55 Bo Cisek – Junior; 58 Max Chapman – Freshman; 60 Jake Gregus – Sophomore; 67 Sean McEvilly – (redshirt) Freshman; 79 C.J. Robbins – Freshman; 88 Quentin Williams – Junior; 90 Jack DiNardo – Senior; 91 Brian Arnfelt – Junior; 92 Will Hampton – Sophomore; 93 Niko Mafuli – Senior; 94 Vince Browne – Senior; 95 Davon Custis – Sophomore; 96 Anthony Battle – Sophomore; 97 Tyler Scott – Sophomore; 98 Deonte Gibson – Freshman; 99 Chance Carter – (redshirt) Freshman	Linebackers: 31 Stone Pinckney – Junior; 33 David Nwabuisi – Junior; 35 Ben Johnson – Senior; 41 Doug Diedrick – Freshman; 43 Tim Riley – Sophomore; 44 Chi Chi Ariguzo – (redshirt) Freshman; 45 Collin Ellis – (redshirt) Freshman; 46 Damien Proby – Sophomore; 48 Roderick Goodlow – Junior; 50 Timmy Vernon – Sophomore; 51 Bryce McNaul – Senior; 54 Drew Smith – Freshman; 56 Will Studlien – Sophomore; Defensive backs: 15 Daniel Jones – (redshirt) Freshman; 16 Davion Fleming – Sophomore; 18 Matt Carpenter – Freshman; 19 Jimmy Hall – (redshirt) Freshman; 20 Austin Kassner – Freshman; 23 Nick VanHoose – Freshman; 24 Ibraheim Campbell – (redshirt) Freshman; 25 Jarrell Williams – Freshman; 36 Mike Eshun – (redshirt) Freshman; 39 Joe Cannon – (redshirt) Freshman; Cornerbacks: 3 Jeravin Matthews – Senior; 13 C.J. Bryant – (redshirt) Freshman; 20 Tim Weak – Junior; 21 Mike Bolden – Senior; 22 Demetrius Dugar – Junior; 26 Jordan Mabin (C) – Senior; 47 Ricky Weina – Senior; Safeties: 7 Hunter Bates – Junior; 10 Brian Peters (C) – Senior; 27 Jared Carpenter – Junior; 32 David Arnold – Senior	Punters: 31 Chris Gradone – Freshman; 49 Brandon Williams – Sophomore; Kickers: 34 Steve Flaherty – Junior; 37 Jeff Budzien – Sophomore; 38 Arthur Omilian – Freshman; Long snappers: 59 Pat Hickey – Sophomore; Head coach: Pat Fitzgerald; Coordinators/Assistant coaches: Randy Bates – Linebackers coach; Jerry brown – Assistant head coach/defensive backs coach; Adam Cushing – Offensive line coach; Mike Hankwitz – Defensive coordinator; Bob heffner – Superbacks coach; Marty long – Defensive line coach; Matt macpherson – Running backs coach/recruiting coordinator; Mick mccall – Offensive coordinator/QBs coach; Dennis springer – Wide receivers coach; Legend: (C) Team captain; Redshirt
