= 2011 Meineke Car Care Bowl of Texas =

Texas A&M Aggies	Northwestern Wildcats
(6–6)	(6–6)
Big 12	Big Ten
33	22
Head coach: Tim DeRuyter (interim)	Head coach: Pat Fitzgerald
	1	2	3	4	Total
Texas A&M	3	17	10	3	33
Northwestern	0	7	0	15	22
- Date: December 31, 2011
- Season: 2011
- Stadium: Reliant Stadium
- Location: Houston, Texas
- MVP: Ryan Tannehill
- Favorite: Texas A&M by 9
- Referee: Matt Loeffler (MWC)
- Attendance: 68,395
- Payout: US$1.7 million per team

United States TV coverage
- Network: ESPN
- Announcers: Bob Wischusen (Play-by-Play); Brian Griese (Analyst); Eamon McAnaney (Sidelines)
- Nielsen ratings: 2.69

The 2011 Meineke Car Care Bowl of Texas, the sixth edition of the game, was a post-season American college football bowl game, held on December 31, 2011, at Reliant Stadium in Houston, Texas, as part of the 2011–12 NCAA Bowl season.

This was the first year the game was known as the Meineke Car Care Bowl of Texas. The game was previously known as the Texas Bowl in 2010 and is not to be confused with the previous Meineke Car Care Bowl held in North Carolina which is now called the Duke's Mayo Bowl.

The game, which was telecast at 11:00 a.m. CT on ESPN and available for streaming online via ESPN3, featured the Northwestern Wildcats of the Big Ten Conference versus the Texas A&M Aggies of the Big 12 Conference.

== Results ==
Texas A&M won the game 33–22. It was the Aggies’ first bowl victory since they won the Galleryfurniture.com Bowl in the Astrodome in the same city of Houston, Texas in 2001. The win broke a string of 5 consecutive bowl losses for the Aggies.

The game MVP was Aggie quarterback Ryan Tannehill, who went 27 of 40 in passing with 329 yards, 1 touchdown, and 1 interception. Tannehill also added 10 rushing yards.

Aggie offensive lineman Joseph Villavisencio was killed in an automobile accident on December 22, 2011, after leaving a Texas A&M team charity event and heading home for the Christmas holiday. The Aggies and Wildcats both honored Villavisencio by wearing black and white helmet decals bearing the words “Joey V” and his number 67.

The Aggies dedicated the game to Villavisencio and former head coach Mike Sherman, who was fired on December 1, 2011, after the conclusion of the regular season.

The Aggies were led by interim head coach Tim DeRuyter. Coach DeRuyter would receive his first win as a head coach before heading to Fresno State to take over the head coaching duties there. New Aggies’ head coach Kevin Sumlin was present at the game and watched from the press box. Coach Sumlin was interviewed by the ESPN announcers during the course of the third quarter where Coach Sumlin discussed the excitement surrounding Texas A&M’s move to the Southeastern Conference in 2012.

The Aggies were playing in their final game as a member of the Big 12 Conference, and gave the Big 12 its only victory in four attempts in the Texas Bowl. Beginning in the 2012 season, the Aggies joined the Southeastern Conference.

Northwestern lost its ninth consecutive bowl game after winning its only bowl in the 1949 Rose Bowl.

== Summary ==
Northwestern had 12 offensive possessions in total, but had to punt on 7 of its first eight possessions. Though they scored two touchdowns in their final four possessions, they could not overcome the Aggies.

Northwestern took its only lead of the game early in the second quarter, 7–3. However, the Aggies put up 27 points before the Wildcats scored again.

=== Texas A&M ===
The Aggies went without their top two running backs during the season in the game. Junior Christine Michael was lost for the season in the game against Oklahoma after suffering a torn ACL in his knee. Senior Cyrus Gray sat out his second straight game after suffering a stress fracture in his left shoulder against Kansas. Gray participated in all pre-bowl practices, but was held out in a game-time decision (without playing, Gray finished his career at Texas A&M ranked third in career rushing with 3,298 yards). Third-string, Sophomore running back Ben Malena responded for the Aggies. He carried 23 times for 77 yards and scored 2 touchdowns. Malena added 6 receptions for 36 yards.

Jeff Fuller accumulated 7 receptions for 119 yards, his season high, and scored one receiving touchdown. Ryan Swope recorded 8 receptions for 105 yards.

Lou Groza award-winner Randy Bullock went 4 for 4 in field goals, connecting from 24, 40, 47 and 31 yards. He added 3 extra points as well.

Dustin Harris had a 35-yard punt return.

The Aggies sacked the Wildcats’ quarterback eight times in the game.

=== Northwestern ===
Dan Persa led the Wildcats in passing, going 25 of 37 for 213 yards, with no touchdowns or interceptions. Persa led the traditional offense for the Wildcats while Kain Colter ran the wildcat offense. Colter went 2 of 3 in passing for 13 yards, with one touchdown and no interceptions.

Colter was also the Wildcats' leading rusher, adding 65 yards on 17 carries and one rushing touchdown. In addition, Colter caught 3 passes for 12 yards and converted one two-point conversion on the day. Venric Mark carried 3 times for 7 yards and scored one touchdown.

The Wildcats' leading receiver was Demetrius Fields who caught 7 passes for 73 yards. Nine other Wildcat receivers would have receptions in the game. The only receiving touchdown was by Tim Riley.

Venric Mark had a 47-yard punt return.

Safety Brian Peters intercepted a pass from Aggie quarterback Ryan Tannehill early in the fourth quarter that the Wildcats were able to convert into a touchdown.

=== Game Statistics ===
	Texas A&M	Northwestern
First Downs	22	24
Third Down Conversions	7/14	5/15
Fourth Down Conversions	0/0	2/2
Total Yards	409	278
Passing yards	329	226
Completions	27/40	27/40
Rushing yards	80	52
Rushing Attempts	27	38
Penalties	7/67	8/67
Turnovers	1	0
Interceptions	1	0
Time of Possession	26:41	33:19
