= 2009 Independence Bowl =

2009 AdvoCare V100 Independence Bowl
Texas A&M Aggies	Georgia Bulldogs
(6–6)	(7–5)
Big 12	SEC
20	44
Head coach: Mike Sherman	Head coach: Mark Richt
	1	2	3	4	Total
Texas A&M	0	7	7	6	20
Georgia	0	14	10	20	44
- Date: December 28, 2009
- Season: 2009
- Stadium: Independence Stadium
- Location: Shreveport, Louisiana
- MVP: Aron White (Offensive), Geno Atkins (Defensive)
- Referee: Terry Leyden (Mountain West Conference)
- Attendance: 49,653
- Payout: US$2,200,000

United States TV coverage
- Network: ESPN2
- Announcers: Ron Franklin; Ed Cunningham; Quint Kessenich

The 2009 AdvoCare V100 Independence Bowl was the thirty-fourth edition of the college football bowl game, and was played at Independence Stadium in Shreveport, Louisiana. The game started at 5:00 p.m. US EST on Monday, December 28, 2009. The game was telecast on ESPN2 and the Georgia Bulldogs defeated the Texas A&M Aggies by a score of 44-20.

The game was Georgia's second appearance in the bowl game. Their previous appearance in the game was a 24–15 victory over the University of Arkansas in 1991.

As for Texas A&M, the Aggies made their third appearance in the Independence Bowl and now hold an overall record of 1–2. Their last appearance resulted in a 43–41 overtime loss to Mississippi State on December 31, 2000, a game since nicknamed the "Snow Bowl" due to the unusual amount of snowfall Shreveport received that day. The entire game was played under extremely wintry conditions, a rarity for Shreveport.

The game was the fifth time that the two schools have faced each other in a game. Texas A&M previously held the series advantage 3–1 (now 3-2). The last time, prior to the bowl that the two teams met was a 42–0 victory by Georgia in 1980. The two teams have played in a bowl game against each other once before, as they met in the 1950 Presidential Cup Bowl. The game, which was played in College Park, Maryland, was the only ever edition of the Presidential Cup Bowl, and Texas A&M was victorious by a score of 40–20.

== Game summary ==
Georgia wore their home red jerseys, and Texas A&M wore their away white jerseys.

Georgia's quarterback, Joe Cox, threw for 157 yards and two touchdowns as the Bulldogs dominated Texas A&M to win their fourth straight bowl game. Tight end Aron White caught both of Cox's touchdown passes, one from 24 yards out and the other a two-yard catch, on his way to being named the game's offensive MVP. Caleb King paced the Bulldogs rushing game with 61 yards on 16 carries and two touchdowns. Special teams also played a huge part in the Georgia victory. The Bulldogs scored their first touchdown of the game on a kickoff return for a score. Georgia also blocked a punt and a field goal attempt, and recovered a bad snap on a punt at the Texas A&M 24-yard line. Aggies quarterback Jerrod Johnson passed for 360 yards and two touchdowns, but also threw two costly interceptions. Jeff Fuller led A&M with 7 receptions for 101 yards in the losing effort. Georgia's six touchdowns tied an Independence Bowl record. And Georgia's 30 second-half points established a new record for points scored in a half for the Independence Bowl.

=== Scoring summary ===
Scoring Play	Score
1st Quarter
No Scoring	TIE 0–0
2nd Quarter
A&M — Jamie McCoy 15-yard pass from Jerrod Johnson (Randy Bullock kick), 2:33	A&M 7–0
UGA — Brandon Boykin 81-yard kickoff return (Blair Walsh kick), 2:22	TIE 7–7
UGA — Caleb King 2-yard rush (Blair Walsh kick), 1:22	UGA 14–7
3rd Quarter
A&M — Christine Michael 14-yard rush (Randy Bullock kick), 12:36	TIE 14–14
UGA — Blair Walsh 49 yard, 9:25	UGA 17–14
UGA — Aron White 24-yard pass from Joe Cox (Blair Walsh kick), 7:49	UGA 24–14
4th Quarter
UGA — Aron White 2-yard pass from Joe Cox (Blair Walsh kick), 13:19	UGA 31–14
UGA — Caleb King 1-yard rush (Blair Walsh kick), 9:47	UGA 38–14
UGA — Shaun Chapas 5-yard rush (Andrew Jensen missed kick), 4:29	UGA 44–14
A&M — Howard Morrow 5-yard pass from Jerrod Johnson (2 point attempt failed), 1:13	UGA 44–20
