= 2009 Georgia Bulldogs football team =

American college football season

2009 Georgia Bulldogs football

Independence Bowl champion

Independence Bowl, W 44–20 vs. Texas A&M
- Conference: Southeastern Conference
- Eastern Division
- Record: 8–5 (4–4 SEC)
- Head coach: Mark Richt (9th season)
- Offensive coordinator: Mike Bobo (3rd season)
- Offensive scheme: Pro-style
- Defensive coordinator: Willie Martinez (5th season)
- Base defense: 4–3
- Home stadium: Sanford Stadium

Uniform

2009 Southeastern Conference football standings
	Conf.			Overall
Team	W		L	W		L
Eastern Division
No. 3 Florida x%	8	–	0	13	–	1
Georgia	4	–	4	8	–	5
Tennessee	4	–	4	7	–	6
Kentucky	3	–	5	7	–	6
South Carolina	3	–	5	7	–	6
Vanderbilt	0	–	8	2	–	10
Western Division
No. 1 Alabama x$#	8	–	0	14	–	0
No. 17 LSU	5	–	3	9	–	4
No. 20 Ole Miss	4	–	4	9	–	4
Arkansas	3	–	5	8	–	5
Auburn	3	–	5	8	–	5
Mississippi State	3	–	5	5	–	7
Championship: Alabama 32, Florida 13
# – BCS National Champion; $ – BCS representative as conference champion; % – BCS at-large representative; x – Division champion/co-champions; Rankings from AP Poll

The 2009 Georgia Bulldogs football team represented the University of Georgia in the 2009 NCAA Division I FBS football season. The Bulldogs competed in the East Division of the Southeastern Conference (SEC). This was the Georgia Bulldogs' ninth season under head coach Mark Richt. The Bulldogs finished the season 8–5, 4–4 in SEC play and won the Independence Bowl, 44–20, against Texas A&M.

== Schedule ==
Date	Time	Opponent	Rank	Site	TV	Result	Attendance
September 5	3:30 p.m.	at No. 9 Oklahoma State*	No. 13	Boone Pickens Stadium; Stillwater, OK	ABC	L 10–24	53,012
September 12	7:00 p.m.	South Carolina	No. 21	Sanford Stadium; Athens, GA (rivalry)	ESPN2	W 41–37	92,746
September 19	7:45 p.m.	at Arkansas	No. 23	Donald W. Reynolds Razorback Stadium; Fayetteville, AR	ESPN	W 52–41	74,210
September 26	7:00 p.m.	Arizona State*	No. 21	Sanford Stadium; Athens, GA	ESPNU	W 20–17	92,746
October 3	3:30 p.m.	No. 4 LSU	No. 18	Sanford Stadium; Athens, GA	CBS	L 13–20	92,746
October 10	12:21 p.m.	at Tennessee		Neyland Stadium; Knoxville, TN (rivalry)	SECN	L 19–45	103,261
October 17	12:21 p.m.	at Vanderbilt		Vanderbilt Stadium; Nashville, TN (rivalry)	SECN	W 34–10	38,340
October 31	3:30 p.m.	vs. No. 1 Florida		Jacksonville Municipal Stadium; Jacksonville, FL (rivalry)	CBS	L 17–41	84,604
November 7	1:00 p.m.	Tennessee Tech*		Sanford Stadium; Athens, GA	PPV	W 38–0	92,746
November 14	7:00 p.m.	Auburn		Sanford Stadium; Athens, GA (Deep South's Oldest Rivalry)	ESPN2	W 31–24	92,746
November 21	7:45 p.m.	Kentucky		Sanford Stadium; Athens, GA	ESPN2	L 27–34	92,746
November 28	8:00 p.m.	at No. 7 Georgia Tech*		Bobby Dodd Stadium; Atlanta, GA (Clean, Old-Fashioned Hate)	ABC/ESPN2	W 30–24	55,407
December 28	5:00 p.m.	vs. Texas A&M*		Independence Stadium; Shreveport, LA (Independence Bowl)	ESPN2	W 44–20	49,653
*Non-conference game; Rankings from Coaches' Poll released prior to the game; All times are in Eastern time

== Rankings ==
Ranking movements Legend: ██ Increase in ranking ██ Decrease in ranking — = Not ranked RV = Received votes
	Week															
Poll	Pre	1	2	3	4	5	6	7	8	9	10	11	12	13	14	Final
AP	13	21	20	17	14	RV	—	—	—	—	—	RV	—	RV	RV	RV
Coaches	13	21	23	21	18	RV	—	RV	RV	—	—	RV	—	RV	RV	RV
Harris	Not released				17	RV	—	RV	RV	—	—	—	—	RV	—	Not released
BCS	Not released							—	—	—	—	—	—	—	—	Not released
