= 2009 Texas A&M Aggies football team =

American college football season

2009 Texas A&M Aggies football

Independence Bowl, L 20–44 vs. Georgia
- Conference: Big 12 Conference
- South Division
- Record: 6–7 (3–5 Big 12)
- Head coach: Mike Sherman (2nd season)
- Offensive coordinator: Nolan Cromwell (2nd season)
- Offensive scheme: Multiple pro-style
- Defensive coordinator: Joe Kines (2nd season)
- Base defense: 3–4
- Home stadium: Kyle Field

Uniform

2009 Big 12 Conference football standings
	Conf.			Overall
Team	W		L	W		L
North Division
No. 14 Nebraska x	6	–	2	10	–	4
Missouri	4	–	4	8	–	5
Kansas State	4	–	4	6	–	6
Iowa State	3	–	5	7	–	6
Colorado	2	–	6	3	–	9
Kansas	1	–	7	5	–	7
South Division
No. 2 Texas x$	8	–	0	13	–	1
Oklahoma State	6	–	2	9	–	4
No. 21 Texas Tech	5	–	3	9	–	4
Oklahoma	5	–	3	8	–	5
Texas A&M	3	–	5	6	–	7
Baylor	1	–	7	4	–	8
Championship: Texas 13, Nebraska 12
$ – BCS representative as conference champion; x – Division champion/co-champions; Rankings from AP Poll

The 2009 Texas A&M Aggies football team (often referred to as "A&M" or the "Aggies") represented Texas A&M University in the 2009 NCAA Division I FBS football season. The team was led by second-year head coach Mike Sherman and played their home games at Kyle Field in College Station, Texas. The Aggies finished the season 6–7, 3–5 in Big 12 play and lost in the Independence Bowl 44–20 against Georgia.

This would be the Aggies' last losing season until 2022.

== Pre-season ==
=== Pre-season All-Big 12 honors ===
- No A&M players were listed in the Media Preseason All-Big 12 team

=== Pre-season watchlists ===
- Cyrus Gray – 2009 Doak Walker Award Nominee
- Jamie McCoy – 2009 John Mackey Award Watch List

== Schedule ==
Phil Steele ranked A&M's strength of schedule 41st.

Date	Time	Opponent	Site	TV	Result	Attendance
September 5	6:05 pm	New Mexico*	Kyle Field; College Station, TX		W 41–6	73,887
September 19	6:00 pm	Utah State*	Kyle Field; College Station, TX		W 38–30	73,599
September 26	6:00 pm	UAB*	Kyle Field; College Station, TX		W 56–19	74,656
October 3	6:30 pm	vs. Arkansas*	Cowboys Stadium; Arlington, TX (Southwest Classic)	ESPN2	L 19–47	71,872
October 10	11:30 am	No. 15 Oklahoma State	Kyle Field; College Station, TX	FSN	L 31–36	76,153
October 17	6:00 pm	at Kansas State	Bill Snyder Family Football Stadium; Manhattan, KS	FCS	L 14–62	44,934
October 24	6:00 pm	at No. 21 Texas Tech	Jones AT&T Stadium; Lubbock, TX (rivalry)		W 52–30	57,733
October 31	2:30 pm	Iowa State	Kyle Field; College Station, TX		W 35–10	72,530
November 7	12:30 pm	at Colorado	Folsom Field; Boulder, CO	FCS	L 34–35	47,227
November 14	6:00 pm	at Oklahoma	Gaylord Family Oklahoma Memorial Stadium; Norman, OK	FSN	L 10–65	85,013
November 21	2:30 pm	Baylor	Kyle Field; College Station, TX (Battle of the Brazos)		W 38–3	82,106
November 26	7:00 pm	No. 3 Texas	Kyle Field; College Station, TX (rivalry)	ESPN	L 39–49	84,671
December 28	4:00 pm	vs. Georgia*	Independence Stadium; Shreveport, LA (Independence Bowl)	ESPN2	L 20–44	49,653
*Non-conference game; Rankings from AP Poll released prior to the game; All times are in Central time

== Coaching staff ==
Name	Position	Alma mater (Year)	Year at A&M
Mike Sherman	Head coach	Central Connecticut State (1978)	2nd
Nolan Cromwell	Offensive coordinator	Kansas (1977)	2nd
Tom Rossley	Quarterbacks	Cincinnati (1969)	2nd
Randy Jordan	Running backs	North Carolina (1993)	2nd
Jim Turner	Offensive line	Boston College (1988)	2nd
Kirk Doll	Special teams Tight ends	East Carolina; Wichita State (1976)	2nd
Joe Kines	Defensive coordinator Assistant head coach	Jacksonville State (1967)	2nd
Buddy Wyatt	Defensive line	TCU (1990)	2nd
Van Malone	Defensive backs	Texas (1993)	4th
Charles McMillian	Defensive backs	Utah State (1995)	2nd
Dave Kennedy	Strength and conditioning	Nebraska (1985)	2nd

== Game summaries ==
=== New Mexico ===
	1	2	3	4	Total
New Mexico	0	3	3	0	6
Texas A&M	7	13	14	7	41

The A&M defense showed considerable improvement since the previous season. The defense registered five sacks, three of which came from Von Miller, who played the jack position. In the 2008 season, Miller finished with only 3½ sacks, while the whole defense produced a combined 16. Jerrod Johnson completed 31 of 41 pass attempts for 349 yards to 10 different receivers. The team also lost 123 yards due to 14 penalties, a statistic Sherman was not happy about.

=== Utah State ===
	1	2	3	4	Total
Utah State	14	0	3	13	30
Texas A&M	14	10	7	7	38

During the second quarter, wide receiver Jeff Fuller suffered a leg injury while attempting to make a catch, and is expected to miss 4–6 weeks. Running back Christine Michael, who rushed for 94 yards, strained his left calf muscle during the third quarter, though should be able to return to practice the following week. A&M did not improve their penalty issues from the season opener, as they were flagged 16 times for 147 yards. The defense also gave up 521 yards to Utah State.

One of the positive aspects of the game was wide receiver Uzoma "EZ" Nwachukwu, who caught three touchdowns and rushed for one. He broke the Aggie freshman single-game touchdown record, which was last set by Leeland McElroy in 1993.

=== UAB ===
	1	2	3	4	Total
UAB	3	3	6	7	19
Texas A&M	7	21	14	14	56

=== Arkansas ===
	1	2	3	4	Total
Texas A&M	10	0	3	6	19
Arkansas	7	23	7	10	47

=== Oklahoma State ===
	1	2	3	4	Total
Oklahoma State	7	7	15	7	36
Texas A&M	0	15	7	9	31

Oklahoma State lost key players Dez Bryant, who was suspended indefinitely, and Kendall Hunter, who had an injury. The Cowboys also lost 118 yards due to penalties, but were still able to win the game.

=== Kansas State ===
	1	2	3	4	Total
Texas A&M	0	0	14	0	14
Kansas State	17	21	21	3	62

=== Texas Tech ===
	1	2	3	4	Total
Texas A&M	7	21	10	14	52
#24 Texas Tech	14	0	8	8	30

A&M picked up its first win at Tech since 1993. Tech was ranked #21 in the AP Poll and #24 in the Coaches Poll heading into the game. The Aggies also defeated the Red Raiders in front of a then record-crowd of 57,733.

=== Iowa State ===
	1	2	3	4	Total
Iowa State	0	3	0	7	10
Texas A&M	14	7	0	14	35

=== Colorado ===
	1	2	3	4	Total
Texas A&M	7	14	0	13	34
Colorado	0	10	11	14	35

=== Oklahoma ===
	1	2	3	4	Total
Texas A&M	10	0	0	0	10
Oklahoma	14	28	16	7	65

=== Baylor ===
	1	2	3	4	Total
Baylor	3	0	0	0	3
Texas A&M	14	7	3	14	38

The Aggies became bowl eligible for the first time since 2007 with a win over Baylor. In the second quarter, freshman running back Christine Michael ran for a 97-yard touchdown, breaking an A&M record for the longest play from scrimmage. The Aggies ran for 375 yards, and for the second time in the season, running backs Cyrus Gray and Christine Michael both ran for over 100 yards. Another record was broken in the third quarter, with Jerrod Johnson breaking Reggie McNeal's record for passing yards in a season.

=== Texas ===
	1	2	3	4	Total
Texas	7	21	7	14	49
Texas A&M	7	14	3	15	39

=== Georgia–Independence Bowl ===
	1	2	3	4	Total
Georgia	0	14	10	20	44
Texas A&M	0	7	7	6	20
