= 2012 Texas A&M Aggies football team =

American college football season

2012 Texas A&M Aggies football

Cotton Bowl Classic champion

Cotton Bowl Classic, W 41–13 vs. Oklahoma
- Conference: Southeastern Conference
- Western Division

Ranking
- Coaches: No. 5
- AP: No. 5
- Record: 11–2 (6–2 SEC)
- Head coach: Kevin Sumlin (1st season)
- Offensive coordinator: Kliff Kingsbury (1st season)
- Offensive scheme: Air raid
- Defensive coordinator: Mark Snyder (1st season)
- Co-defensive coordinator: Marcel Yates (1st season)
- Base defense: 4–3
- Captains: Pat Lewis; Sean Porter; Ryan Swope; Steven Terrell
- Home stadium: Kyle Field

2012 Southeastern Conference football standings
	Conf.			Overall
Team	W		L	W		L
Eastern Division
No. T–5 Georgia xy	7	–	1	12	–	2
No. 9 Florida x%	7	–	1	11	–	2
No. 8 South Carolina	6	–	2	11	–	2
No. 23 Vanderbilt	5	–	3	9	–	4
Missouri	2	–	6	5	–	7
Tennessee	1	–	7	5	–	7
Kentucky	0	–	8	2	–	10
Western Division
No. 1 Alabama x$#	7	–	1	13	–	1
No. 14 LSU *	6	–	2	10	–	3
No. T–5 Texas A&M	6	–	2	11	–	2
Mississippi State	4	–	4	8	–	5
Ole Miss *	3	–	5	7	–	6
Arkansas	2	–	6	4	–	8
Auburn	0	–	8	3	–	9
Championship: Alabama 32, Georgia 28
# – BCS National Champion; $ – BCS representative as conference champion; % – BCS at-large representative; x – Division champion/co-champions; y – Championship game participant; * Ole Miss and LSU vacated all wins due to NCAA violations.; Rankings from AP Poll

The 2012 Texas A&M Aggies football team represented Texas A&M University in the 2012 NCAA Division I FBS football season. The Aggies were led by first-year head coach Kevin Sumlin in their first year as a member of the Southeastern Conference, playing in the SEC's Western Division. They played their home games at Kyle Field. Because the Aggies scheduled two FCS opponents, they needed seven wins in the regular season to become eligible for postseason competition (if they beat both FCS teams); Texas A&M won 10 games in the regular season (including both games against FCS opponents) and thus was bowl-eligible.

During the offseason, in anticipation of the demand for tickets from students and to comply with SEC rules, Texas A&M reallocated some student seating sections, a net gain of 128 seats bringing the student section to 30,284 seats, the largest in the nation.

On March 27, 2012, Texas A&M announced that season tickets were sold out, making it the earliest sellout in school history.

The 2012 football season was highly successful for the Aggies. The team went 11–2, with victories over then-#1 Alabama and later Oklahoma in the 2013 Cotton Bowl Classic. Quarterback Johnny Manziel became the first freshman to be awarded the Heisman Trophy, and only the second Aggie player ever to win the Heisman. Texas A&M's 5th-place finish in the AP Poll was the highest for the program since 1956.

== Before the season ==
=== Previous season ===
In 2011, Texas A&M began the season ranked 8th in the AP Poll and 9th in the Coaches Poll. They won their first two games, but fell to ranked opponents Oklahoma State and Arkansas. The Aggies won the next three, including a 55–28 victory over rival and #20 ranked Baylor. However, A&M could not sustain success and fell in its next three, with losses to #7 Oklahoma and #17 Kansas State in 4 overtimes. After beating Kansas, Texas A&M lost its final regular season rivalry game with Texas 25–27. Following this defeat, 4-year head coach Mike Sherman was fired, and replaced by Kevin Sumlin. The Aggies defeated Northwestern in the Meineke Car Care Bowl of Texas with Tim DeRuyter as interim head coach. Texas A&M finished 7–6, unranked, and tied for 6th in the Big XII.

=== 2012 NFL draft ===
Four Texas A&M players were drafted in the 2012 NFL draft.

2012 NFL Draft selections
Round	Pick #	Team	Player	Position
1	8	Miami Dolphins	Ryan Tannehill	Quarterback
5	161	Houston Texans	Randy Bullock	Kicker
6	182	Kansas City Chiefs	Cyrus Gray	Running back
7	246	Pittsburgh Steelers	Terrence Frederick	Corner

After the draft, five Aggies were signed as undrafted free agents.

Signed as Undrafted Free Agent
Player	Team	Position
Jeff Fuller	Miami Dolphins	Wide Receiver
Coryell Judie	Denver Broncos	Corner
Tony Jerod-Eddie	San Francisco 49ers	Defensive End
Eddie Brown	San Diego Chargers	Defensive tackle
Lionel Smith	Dallas Cowboys	Corner

=== Spring practice ===
Spring practice began on March 31 and concluded with the annual Maroon & White Game on April 28. The schedule also included an open scrimmage on April 14 and the Friday Night Lights event on April 20. Senior running back Christine Michael was limited throughout spring practice while recovering from a torn ACL.

Maroon & White Game – Texas A&M Spring Game

Quarter	1	2	3	4	Total
White (Offense)	0	0	0	48	48
Maroon (Defense)	0	0	0	44	44

at Kyle Field • College Station, Texas

- Date: April 28, 2012
- Game time: 1:00 p.m.
- Game attendance: 15,000+

Game information
- Kyle Serres 51-yard field goal
- Ryan Swope 63-yard pass from Johnny Manziel (Serres kick)
- Taylor Bertolet 36-yard field goal
- Ryan Swope 50-yard pass from Jameill Showers (Bertolet kick)
- Ben Malena 1-yard run (Bertolet kick)
- Malcome Kennedy 63-yard pass from Jameill Showers (Bertolet kick)
- Will Randolph 12-yard run (Bertolet kick)
- Will Randolph 13-yard run (Bertolet kick)

In the Maroon & White Game, the White (offense) defeated the Maroon (defense) 48–44. The offense ran 105 plays in the first half and generated nearly 600 yards of total offense. Wide receiver Ryan Swope recorded eight receptions for 156 yards and two touchdowns. The game featured a quarterback battle between Jameill Showers and Johnny Manziel; Showers threw touchdown passes to Malcome Kennedy and Swope, while Manziel added a touchdown pass to Swope. Showers finished 20-of-31 for 203 yards and two touchdowns, while Manziel went 13-of-27 for 154 yards, one touchdown, and one interception. Running back Christine Michael did not participate, but Ben Malena led the rushing attack with 117 yards on 11 carries and a touchdown, while Will Randolph added 86 yards on 13 carries and two touchdowns behind an offensive line anchored by tackle Luke Joeckel. On defense, Steven Jenkins led the team with nine tackles, while Donnie Baggs recorded eight. Domonique Patterson, Johntel Franklin, and Jonathan Stewart each added six tackles, and Sean Porter contributed two sacks.

=== Fall practice ===
Fall training camp began on August 3 and ended on August 18. By August, Texas A&M had 8 different players on preseason award watch lists: Sean Porter for the Chuck Bednarik Award; Uzoma Nwachukwu and Ryan Swope for the Biletnikoff Award; Damontre Moore and Sean Porter for the Butkus Award; Luke Joeckel, Jake Matthews, and Sean Porter for the Lombardi Award; Christine Michael for the Maxwell Award; Sean Porter for the Bronco Nagurski Award; Luke Joeckel and Jake Matthews for the Outland Trophy; Patrick Lewis for the Rimington Trophy; and Christine Michael for the Doak Walker Award.

== Personnel ==
=== Roster ===
2012 Texas A&M Aggies football team roster
Players
Coaches
Offense

Pos.	#	Name	Class
RB	1	Ben Malena	Jr
QB	2	Johnny Manziel	Fr
QB	3	Jameill Showers	So
WR	4	Brandal Jackson	Sr
WR	5	Kenric McNeal	Sr
QB	6	Matt Davis	Fr
WR	7	Uzoma Nwachukwu	Sr
WR	8	Thomas Johnson	Fr
WR	9	Nate Askew	Jr
WR	10	LeKendrick Williams	So
WR	11	Derel Walker	Jr
WR	13	Mike Evans	Fr
QB	14	Conner McQueen	Fr
WR	15	Travis Labhart	Jr
QB	16	Matt Joeckel	So
QB	17	Joshua Stump	Fr
WR	18	Edward Pope	Fr
TE	19	Michael Lamothe	Sr
RB	20	Trey Williams	Fr
RB	21	Tra Carson (I)	So
RB	23	Sabian Holmes	Fr
WR	25	Ryan Swope (C)	Sr
RB	26	Sam Giamfortone	So
RB	27	Brice Dolezal	Fr
RB	28	Brandon Williams (I)	So
RB	29	D'Cardio Cottonham	Fr
RB	33	Christine Michael	Sr
WR	35	Matt Wilkins	So
RB	37	Garrett Graham	So
TE	47	Daniel Inglett	Fr
OL	50	Justin Ortega	So
OL	51	Jarvis Harrison	So
OL	53	Caden Smith	Fr
OL	56	Mike Matthews	Fr
OL	57	Dylan Guthrie	So
OL	59	Allen Woodum	Sr
OL	60	Nathan Gutekunst	Fr
OL	61	Patrick Lewis (C)	Sr
OL	65	John-Albert Arechiga	Fr
OL	68	Ben Compton	So
OL	70	Cedric Ogbuehi	So
OL	71	Kimo Tipoti	Fr
OL	74	Germain Ifedi	Fr
OL	75	Jake Matthews	Jr
OL	76	Luke Joeckel	Jr
OL	77	Shep Klinke	Jr
OL	78	Garrett Gramling	So
OL	79	Joseph Cheek	Fr
TE	81	Nehemiah Hicks	Jr
WR	82	Boone Niederhofer	Fr
WR	83	Colton Beardmore	Fr
WR	84	Malcome Kennedy	So
WR	85	Kyle Aubuchon	So
TE	86	Caleb Little	So
WR	88	Gaston Lamascus	Jr

Defense

Pos.	#	Name	Class
DB	1	De'Vante Harris	Fr
DB	2	Steven Campbell	Sr
DB	4	Toney Hurd Jr.	Jr
DB	6	Desmond Gardiner	Jr
DB	7	Tramain Jacobs	Jr
LB	10	Sean Porter (C)	Sr
LB	11	Jonathan Stewart	Sr
DB	14	Floyd Raven Sr.	So
DB	15	Kenneth Marshall	Fr
DB	19	Matt Fritsche	Fr
DB	20	C.J. Jones	Sr
DB	21	Steven Terrell (C)	Sr
DB	22	Dustin Harris	Sr
LB	23	Domonique Patterson	Jr
DB	25	Clay Honeycutt	So
DB	26	Devonta Burns	Fr
LB	27	Michael Osadebey	Sr
DB	29	Deshazor Everett	So
DB	30	Johntel Franklin	Jr
DB	31	Howard Matthews	So
DB	32	Rylan Riney	Fr
LB	33	Michael Richardson	Fr
LB	34	Jordan Richmond	Fr
LB	35	Tyrell Taylor	So
LB	36	Donnie Baggs	So
DB	39	Marvin Taylor	Fr
LB	40	Shaun Ward	So
LB	43	Justin Bass	So
DB	44	Sam Moeller	Fr
LB	45	Steven Jenkins	Jr
LB	46	Jake Russell	Jr
LB	49	Brandon Hoff	Fr
LB	50	Tyrone Taylor	Fr
DL	55	Alonzo Williams	Fr
LB	57	Alvin Munrose	Fr
LB	58	Cody Johnson	Fr
DL	67	Tyler Godwin	Fr
DL	72	Gavin Stansbury	So
DL	73	Rhontae Scales	Jr
DL	89	Ivan Robinson	So
DL	90	Polo Manukainiu	Fr
DL	92	Jonathan Mathis	Sr
DL	94	Damontre Moore	Jr
DL	95	Julien Obioha	Fr
DL	98	Shayvion Hatten	Fr
DL	99	Spencer Nealy	Sr

Special teams

Pos.	#	Name	Class
PK	24	Taylor Bertolet	Fr
PK	31	Seth Wicks	Fr
PK	36	Davis Plowman	Fr
P	38	Drew Kaser	So
PK	40	Seth Hiddink	Fr
P	48	Ryan Epperson	Sr
PK	49	Josh Lambo	So
DS	62	Nick Brown	Fr
DS	64	Jonathan Puffer	So

Head coach

- Kevin Sumlin (1st season)

Coordinators/assistant coaches

- Scott Aligo – Defensive Graduate Assistant
- B.J. Anderson – Offensive line
- David Beaty – Wide receivers/recruiting coordinator
- Kenny Bell – Director of Recruiting
- Bryan Cummings – Special Teams Quality Control
- Larry Jackson – Director of Football Sports Performance
- Kliff Kingsbury – Offensive coordinator/quarterbacks
- Clarence McKinney – Offensive coordinator/running backs
- Justin Moore – Associate athletic director for football
- Brian Polian – Special teams coordinator/tight ends
- Terry Price – Defensive line
- Nathan Reeves – Offensive quality control
- Gary Reynolds – Director of football operations
- Mark Snyder – Defensive coordinator
- Byron Thomas – Defensive Graduate Assistant
- Matt Wallerstedt – Linebackers
- Marcel Yates – Co-defensive Coordinator/secondary

Legend

- (C) Team captain
- (S) Suspended
- (I) Ineligible
- Injured
- Redshirt

Roster
Last update: May 24, 2013

=== Recruiting class ===
In the 2012 recruiting class, Texas A&M recruited 19 players, 5 of which were included in the ESPN 150. The class was ranked 15th in the nation by ESPN and Rivals, and 21st nationally by Scout.

College recruiting (2012)
Name	Hometown	School	Height	Weight	40^{‡}	Commit date
Matt Davis; QB	Houston, TX	Klein Forest HS	6 ft 1 in (1.85 m)	205 lb (93 kg)	4.40	Apr 16, 2011
Matt Davis; QB	Recruit ratings: Scout: Rivals: (80)					
De'Vante Harris; CB	Mesquite, TX	Horn HS	5 ft 11 in (1.80 m)	160 lb (73 kg)	4.40	Jan 16, 2012
De'Vante Harris; CB	Recruit ratings: Scout: Rivals: (80)					
Sabian Holmes; CB	Southlake, TX	Carroll HS	5 ft 11 in (1.80 m)	175 lb (79 kg)	4.50	Jan 8, 2012
Sabian Holmes; CB	Recruit ratings: Scout: Rivals: (77)					
Germain Ifedi; OG	Houston, TX	Westside HS	6 ft 5 in (1.96 m)	304 lb (138 kg)	–	Oct 25, 2011
Germain Ifedi; OG	Recruit ratings: Scout: Rivals: (79)					
Otis Jacobs; CB	Covington, LA	Mississippi Gulf Coast CC	6 ft 1 in (1.85 m)	180 lb (82 kg)	–	Dec 21, 2011
Otis Jacobs; CB	Recruit ratings: Scout: Rivals: ( –)					
Thomas Johnson; WR	Dallas, TX	Skyline HS	6 ft 0 in (1.83 m)	180 lb (82 kg)	4.40	Feb 1, 2012
Thomas Johnson; WR	Recruit ratings: Scout: Rivals: (82)					
Polo Manukainiu; DE	Euless, TX	Trinity HS	6 ft 6 in (1.98 m)	256 lb (116 kg)	4.90	Jan 29, 2012
Polo Manukainiu; DE	Recruit ratings: Scout: Rivals: (79)					
Kenneth Marshall; S	South Houston, TX	South Houston HS	6 ft 0 in (1.83 m)	191 lb (87 kg)	4.50	Jun 13, 2011
Kenneth Marshall; S	Recruit ratings: Scout: Rivals: (76)					
Mike Matthews; C	Missouri City, TX	Elkins HS	6 ft 3 in (1.91 m)	260 lb (120 kg)	5.00	Feb 23, 2011
Mike Matthews; C	Recruit ratings: Scout: Rivals: (78)					
Julien Obioha; DE	New Orleans, LA	Brother Martin HS	6 ft 3 in (1.91 m)	245 lb (111 kg)	4.84	Jul 28, 2011
Julien Obioha; DE	Recruit ratings: Scout: Rivals: (79)					
Edward Pope; S	Carthage, TX	Carthage HS	6 ft 3 in (1.91 m)	175 lb (79 kg)	4.54	Jan 27, 2012
Edward Pope; S	Recruit ratings: Scout: Rivals: (78)					
Edmund Ray; DT	Saint Louis, MO	Ritenour HS	6 ft 5 in (1.96 m)	290 lb (130 kg)	5.10	Feb 1, 2012
Edmund Ray; DT	Recruit ratings: Scout: Rivals: (77)					
Michael Richardson; DE	DeSoto, TX	DeSoto HS	6 ft 2 in (1.88 m)	224 lb (102 kg)	4.95	Feb 18, 2011
Michael Richardson; DE	Recruit ratings: Scout: Rivals: (80)					
Jordan Richmond; OLB	Denton, TX	Billy Ryan HS	6 ft 1 in (1.85 m)	220 lb (100 kg)	4.63	Feb 20, 2011
Jordan Richmond; OLB	Recruit ratings: Scout: Rivals: (80)					
Tyrone Taylor; DE	Galena Park, TX	Galena Park HS	6 ft 3 in (1.91 m)	210 lb (95 kg)	4.80	Dec 18, 2010
Tyrone Taylor; DE	Recruit ratings: Scout: Rivals: (79)					
Kimo Tipoti; OT	Hurst, TX	L. D. Bell HS	6 ft 4 in (1.93 m)	330 lb (150 kg)	5.67	Feb 20, 2011
Kimo Tipoti; OT	Recruit ratings: Scout: Rivals: (79)					
Derel Walker; WR	Athens, TX	Trinity Valley CC	6 ft 2 in (1.88 m)	180 lb (82 kg)	4.40	Dec 22, 2011
Derel Walker; WR	Recruit ratings: Scout: Rivals: ( –)					
Alonzo Williams; DE	Long Beach, CA	Long Beach Polytechnic HS	6 ft 3 in (1.91 m)	240 lb (110 kg)	–	Feb 23, 2011
Alonzo Williams; DE	Recruit ratings: Scout: Rivals: (78)					
Trey Williams; RB	Houston, TX	Andy Dekaney HS	5 ft 8 in (1.73 m)	180 lb (82 kg)	4.37	Apr 16, 2011
Trey Williams; RB	Recruit ratings: Scout: Rivals: (81)					
Overall recruit ranking: Scout: 21 Rivals: 15 ESPN: 15
‡ Refers to 40-yard dash; Note: In many cases, Scout, Rivals, 247Sports, On3, and ESPN may conflict in their listings of height, weight and 40 time.; In these cases, the average was taken. ESPN grades are on a 100-point scale.; Sources: "Texas A&M Football Commitment List 2012". Rivals.; "Texas A&M College Football Recruiting Commits 2012". Scout.; "Texas A&M Aggies Commits 2012". ESPN.; "Scout.com Team Recruiting Rankings". Scout.; "2012 Team Ranking". Rivals.com.

=== Returning starters ===
Offense
Player	Class	Position
Christine Michael	Senior	Running Back
Ryan Swope	Senior	Wide Receiver
Uzoma Nwachukwu	Senior	Wide Receiver
Michael Lamothe	Senior	Tight End
Luke Joeckel	Junior	Left Tackle
Patrick Lewis	Senior	Center
Cedric Ogbuehi	Sophomore	Right Guard
Jake Matthews	Junior	Right Tackle

Defense
Player	Class	Position
Spencer Nealy	Senior	Defensive tackle
Damontre Moore	Junior	Defensive End/Jack Linebacker
Jonathan Stewart	Senior	Linebacker
Steven Jenkins	Junior	Linebacker
Sean Porter	Senior	Linebacker

Special Teams
Player	Class	Position
Ryan Epperson	Senior	Punter
Dustin Harris	Junior	Punt Returner

=== Depth chart ===
Defense

FS
21 Steven Terrell
4 Toney Hurd Jr.
⋅

WLB	MLB	SLB
45 Steven Jenkins; 36 Donnie Baggs	11 Jonathan Stewart	10 Sean Porter
⋅	43 Justin Bass	4 Toney Hurd Jr.
⋅	⋅	⋅

BS
31 Howard Matthews
30 Johntel Franklin
⋅

CB
22 Dustin Harris
7 Tramain Jacobs
⋅

DE	DT	DT	DE
94 Damontre Moore	99 Spencer Nealy	42 Kirby Ennis	95 Julien Obioha
35 Tyrell Taylor	89 Ivan Robinson	92 Jonathan Mathis	72 Gavin Stansbury
⋅	⋅	⋅	⋅

CB
29 Deshazor Everett
1 De'Vante Harris
14 Floyd Raven Sr.

Offense

WR
7 Uzoma Nwachukwu
23 Sabian Holmes
⋅

WR
5 Kenric McNeal
10 LeKendrick Williams
⋅

LT	LG	C	RG	RT
76 Luke Joeckel	51 Jarvis Harrison	61 Patrick Lewis	70 Cedric Ogbuehi	75 Jake Matthews
74 Germain Ifedi	74 Germain Ifedi	56 Mike Matthews	68 Ben Compton	79 Joseph Cheek
⋅	⋅	⋅	⋅	⋅

WR
25 Ryan Swope
84 Malcome Kennedy
⋅

WR
13 Mike Evans
11 Derel Walker
9 Nate Askew

QB
2 Johnny Manziel
3 Jameill Showers
16 Matt Joeckel

RB
1 Ben Malena
33 Christine Michael
20 Trey Williams
27 Brice Dolezal

Special teams
PK 24 Taylor Bertolet
PK 49 Josh Lambo
P 48 Ryan Epperson
P 38 Drew Kaser
KR 20 Trey Williams
PR 22 Dustin Harris
LS 75 Jake Matthews
H 48 Ryan Epperson

== Schedule ==
Date	Time	Opponent	Rank	Site	TV	Result	Attendance
September 8	2:30 pm	No. 24 Florida		Kyle Field; College Station, TX (College GameDay)	ESPN	L 17–20	87,114
September 15	2:30 pm	at SMU*		Gerald J. Ford Stadium; University Park, TX	FSN	W 48–3	32,016
September 22	6:00 pm	South Carolina State*		Kyle Field; College Station, TX	SECRN	W 70–14	86,775
September 29	11:21 am	Arkansas		Kyle Field; College Station, TX (rivalry)	SECN	W 58–10	86,442
October 6	6:00 pm	at Ole Miss		Vaught–Hemingway Stadium; Oxford, MS	ESPNU	W 30–27	55,343
October 13	8:15 pm	at No. 23 Louisiana Tech*	No. 22	Independence Stadium; Shreveport, LA	ESPNU	W 59–57	40,453
October 20	11:00 am	No. 6 LSU	No. 20	Kyle Field; College Station, TX (rivalry)	ESPN	L 19–24	87,429
October 27	6:00 pm	at Auburn	No. 22	Jordan–Hare Stadium; Auburn, AL	ESPNU	W 63–21	85,119
November 3	11:00 am	at No. 17 Mississippi State	No. 16	Davis Wade Stadium; Starkville, MS	ESPN	W 38–13	55,240
November 10	2:30 pm	at No. 1 Alabama	No. 15	Bryant–Denny Stadium; Tuscaloosa, AL	CBS	W 29–24	101,821
November 17	2:30 pm	No. 3 (FCS) Sam Houston State*	No. 9	Kyle Field; College Station, TX	PPV	W 47–28	87,101
November 24	6:00 pm	Missouri	No. 9	Kyle Field; College Station, TX	ESPN2	W 59–29	87,222
January 4	7:00 pm	vs. No. 12 Oklahoma*	No. 9	Cowboys Stadium; Arlington, TX (Cotton Bowl Classic)	FOX	W 41–13	87,025
*Non-conference game; Rankings from AP Poll released prior to the game; All times are in Central time

== Coaching staff ==
Name	Position	Season at Texas A&M
Kevin Sumlin	Head coach	1st
Mark Snyder	Defensive coordinator and linebackers coach	1st
Marcel Yates	Co-defensive coordinator and defensive backs coach	1st
Terry Price	Defensive line coach	1st
Matt Wallerstedt	Linebackers coach	1st
Kliff Kingsbury	Offensive coordinator and quarterbacks coach	1st
Clarence McKinney	Running backs coach	1st
David Beaty	Wide receivers coach	1st
B.J. Anderson	Offensive line coach	1st
Brian Polian	Special teams coordinator and tight ends coach	1st
Larry Jackson	Director of football sports performance	1st

== Rankings ==
Ranking movements Legend: ██ Increase in ranking ██ Decrease in ranking — = Not ranked RV = Received votes т = Tied with team above or below
	Week															
Poll	Pre	1	2	3	4	5	6	7	8	9	10	11	12	13	14	Final
AP	RV	RV	—	RV	RV	RV	22	20	22	16	15	9	9	10	10	5 т
Coaches	RV	RV	RV	RV	RV	RV	21	19	21	16	14	10	10	8	9	5
Harris	Not released						23	19	21	18	15	10	10	9	9	Not released
BCS	Not released							18	20	16	15	8	9	9	9	Not released

== Game summaries ==
=== No. 24 Florida ===
Team	1	2	3	4	Total
• No. 24 Gators	7	3	3	7	20
Aggies	3	14	0	0	17

- Location: Kyle Field
  College Station, Texas
- Game start: 2:37 p.m.
- Elapsed time: 3:13
- Game attendance: 87,114
- Game weather: 83°, clear, winds N at 21 mph
- Referee: Matt Moore
- TV announcers (ESPN): Brent Musburger (play-by-play), Kirk Herbstreit (commentary), Heather Cox (sideline reporter)
- Sources:
- Official Texas A&M Game Notes (PDF)

Scoring summary
1	10:34	Texas A&M	Taylor Bertolet 27 Yard Field Goal	Texas A&M 3–0
1	3:51	Florida	Mike Gillislee 4 Yard Run (Caleb Sturgis Kick)	Florida 7–3
2	13:39	Texas A&M	Johnny Manziel 11 Yard Run (Taylor Bertolet Kick)	Texas A&M 10–7
2	7:01	Texas A&M	Christine Michael 1 Yard Run (Taylor Bertolet Kick)	Texas A&M 17–7
2	1:49	Florida	Caleb Sturgis 51 Yard Field Goal	Texas A&M 17–10
3	11:02	Florida	Caleb Sturgis 25 Yard Field Goal	Texas A&M 17–13
4	13:05	Florida	Mike Gillislee 12 Yard Run (Caleb Sturgis Kick)	Florida 20–17

Statistics	FLA	TAMU
First downs	21	21
Total yards	307	334
Rushing yards	142	134
Passing yards	165	200
Turnovers	0	0
Time of possession	35:07	24:53

Team	Category	Player	Statistics
Florida	Passing	Jeff Driskel	13/16, 162 yards
Florida	Rushing	Mike Gillislee	14 rushes, 83 yards, 2 TD
Florida	Receiving	Jordan Reed	5 receptions, 59 yards
Texas A&M	Passing	Johnny Manziel	23/30, 173 yards
Texas A&M	Rushing	Johnny Manziel	17 rushes, 60 yards, TD
Texas A&M	Receiving	Mike Evans	7 receptions, 60 yards

After Texas A&M's season opener against Louisiana Tech was postponed due to Hurricane Isaac, the Aggies began the season against SEC opponent #24 Florida. This was a historic start for redshirt freshman quarterback Johnny Manziel, who won the job in Fall practice. Manziel was the first freshman QB to start a season-opener for the Aggies since 1944. Texas A&M played well in the first half and saw promising performances from both the offense and defense, but they could not sustain the success and were held scoreless in the second half, ultimately falling 20–17 to lose their first ever SEC conference game.

Texas A&M received the ball on the opening kickoff. Their first play from scrimmage in the SEC was a false start on center Patrick Lewis; however, the offense was not slowed by this misstep and had a 14-play, 66-yard opening drive, highlighted by a 16-yard run from Johnny Manziel. On 3rd and goal from the 7, Manziel completed a pass into the endzone to an open Mike Evans, but Manziel was past the line of scrimmage, causing an Illegal Forward Pass penalty and a 4th down. Fellow redshirt freshman Taylor Bertolet made the 27-yard field goal to put the Aggies on the board first. Texas A&M's defense struggled early, though, and with the help of a few long passes from Florida QB Jeff Driskel, the Gators had a 13-play, 75-yard drive capped of by a Mike Gillislee 4-yard TD run to take the lead 7–3. But the Aggies' offense showed no signs of slowing, as they drove all the way to the Florida 14 before the 1st Quarter ended.

Three plays into the 2nd Quarter and the Aggies had scored their first SEC touchdown—an 11-yard scramble by Johnny Manziel. Texas A&M took the lead back 10–7. Florida's next series began with Jeff Driskel being sacked by DE Damontre Moore. The Gators didn't move far before Driskel was sacked twice more, first by Steven Jenkens and then a second time by Moore, forcing a punt. On A&M's next drive, Manziel connected with freshman RB Trey Williams for 28 yards and then on a trick play, WR Kenric McNeal completed a pass to Mike Evans for 27. Near the goal line, the Aggies pounded the ball in with senior RB Christine Michael to extend the lead, 17–7. On the next possession, Driskel was again sacked by Moore, but made up the yardage with a long 30-yard pass to Jordan Reed. At the A&M 28, Driskel was sacked for the fifth time of the game by senior DT Spencer Nealy. On 4th and 12 at A&M's 33, the Gators' Caleb Sturgis attempted a long 51-yard field goal and missed; however, Texas A&M took a timeout prior to the snap, and on his second try Sturgis knocked it home to reduce the Aggies' lead to 17–-10. Back on offense, the Aggies could not get down the field before the half ended; the score still 17–10 Texas A&M.

Florida received the ball coming back from the half, and wasted no time moving the ball downfield on the ground, highlighted by Mike Gillislee rushing for 24 and Driskel scrambling for 12. Ultimately the drive stalled inside the 10 and Florida had to settle for another Sturgis field goal, chipping the lead down to 17–13. Texas A&M's offense never got going in the second half however, and their first possession gained only 8 yards, forcing the first put of the game for Ryan Epperson. The teams traded defensive blows for the next few possessions: Florida's 2nd of the half gained only 11 after Driskel was sacked 2 more times by Nealy and Porter. A&M totaled −1 on their ensuing drive, and after the Gators received the punt, they could not sustain the ground attack and gave the ball back to the Aggies for a possession stifled by a personal foul penalty to end the 3rd Quarter. The Aggies were clinging to a 4-point lead, 17–13.

The 4th Quarter began with Manziel being sacked by Lerentee McCray, and the Aggies promptly punting. Starting with good field position at their own 38, the Gators' passing game came through and Driskel completed a 39-yard bomb to Omarius Hines down to the A&M 18. After a short Solomon Patton rush, Mike Gillislee took a pitch to the right side and tip-toed in bounds to score a 12-yard TD and take the lead 20–17. The A&M offense could not find an answer to the tough Gator defense and had to punt on the next drive. The Aggie defense did prevent Florida from extending the lead (due in part to yet another Driskel sack, his 8th of the game, this time by safety Floyd Raven Sr.) and gave the offense another chance. After 2 no-gain plays, Manziel scrambled for just over 9 yards and was marked just short of the 1st down. Unable to convert, they gave it back to Florida, who was again held to only 3 yards to give the Aggies one last chance with 6:10 remaining in the game. The drive looked hopeful: a few short gains moved the sticks twice, but after a false start on Lewis, the Aggies could not convert. On their own 39, they were forced to punt with only 3:13 left on the clock. Once the Gators got the ball, the Aggie defense could not slow them, giving up a 15-yard facemask penalty, a 12-yard Patton run, and a 21-yard Driskel rush, which allowed Florida to kneel the ball and take the rest of the time off the clock, ending the game 20–17.

Johnny Manziel finished the game 23-of-30 for 173 yards (his lowest total of the season) with no touchdowns or interceptions. He led the team in rushing yards with 60 on 17 attempts, averaging 3.5 (his 2nd lowest of the season). Mike Evans led the team in receiving with 7 catches for 60 yards. Notably, Damontre Moore had a career-high 3.0 sacks and a then-career-high 10.0 tackles, pitching in to the Aggies' 8.0 total sacks for a loss of 48 yards. He received the SEC Co-defensive Lineman of the Week award for his performance. The loss dropped A&M's all-time record against Florida to 1–2. Although the Aggies began their SEC debut with a tough loss, hopes were still high for Kevin Sumlin's new team, and freshman QB Johnny Manziel looked promising.

=== At SMU ===
Team	1	2	3	4	Total
• Aggies	0	20	21	7	48
Mustangs	0	0	3	0	3

- Location: Gerald J. Ford Stadium
  University Park, Texas
- Game start: 2:35 p.m.
- Elapsed time: 3:36
- Game attendance: 32,016
- Game weather: 73°, partly cloudy, winds WNW at 5 mph
- Referee: Penn Wagers
- TV announcers (FSN): Ron Thulin (play-by-play), Shaun King (commentary), Desmond Purnell (sideline reporter)
- Sources:
- Official Texas A&M Game Notes (PDF)

Scoring summary
2	8:38	Texas A&M	Ryan Swope 29 Yard Pass From Johnny Manziel (Taylor Bertolet Kick)	Texas A&M 7–0
2	3:26	Texas A&M	Johnny Manziel 48 Yard Run (PAT Blocked)	Texas A&M 13–0
2	1:03	Texas A&M	Uzoma Nwachukwu 26 Yard Pass From Johnny Manziel (Taylor Bertolet Kick)	Texas A&M 20–0
3	10:31	Texas A&M	Kenric McNeal 42 Yard Pass From Johnny Manziel (Taylor Bertolet Kick)	Texas A&M 27–0
3	7:01	SMU	Chase Hover 25 Yard Field Goal	Texas A&M 27–3
3	4:27	Texas A&M	Johnny Manziel 15 Yard Run (Taylor Bertolet Kick)	Texas A&M 34–3
3	0:58	Texas A&M	Uzoma Nwachukwu 12 Yard Pass From Johnny Manziel (Taylor Bertolet Kick)	Texas A&M 41–3
4	9:31	Texas A&M	Trey Williams 2 Yard Run (Taylor Bertolet Kick)	Texas A&M 48–3

Statistics	TAMU	SMU
First downs	28	17
Total yards	605	309
Rushing yards	225	106
Passing yards	380	203
Turnovers	0	1
Time of possession	28:24	31:36

Team	Category	Player	Statistics
Texas A&M	Passing	Johnny Manziel	20/36, 294 yards, 4 TD
Texas A&M	Rushing	Johnny Manziel	13 rushes, 124 yards, 2 TD
Texas A&M	Receiving	Mike Evans	6 receptions, 123 yards
SMU	Passing	Garrett Gilbert	23/49, 203 yards, INT
SMU	Rushing	Zach Line	16 rushes, 104 yards
SMU	Receiving	Darius Johnson	5 receptions, 52 yards

Following their loss to Florida, the Aggies took on non-conference opponent SMU. The offense got off to a slow start, but came to life in the 2nd Quarter. After the Aggies scored 27 unanswered points, SMU made a field goal to get their only points of the game. A&M scored 21 more afterwards to make it a 48–3 rout. Johnny Manziel set an A&M freshman passing record with 294 yards and helped improve the Aggies' record to 1–1.

Texas A&M received the ball to start the game; however, the offense struggled for the first few possessions of the game. After losing 6 yards on a pass to Thomas Johnson, Manziel rushed for 11 but could not convert the 3rd and 16, forcing the first drive of the game to end in a punt. The Aggie defense looked strong though, and with SMU on 3rd and 8, DE Damontre Moore shined again, sacking quarterback Garrett Gilbert for a loss of 9. A&M then moved the chains once, but after a Manziel sack by Taylor Reed and a false start, they once again could not convert a 3rd and long. Deep in their own territory, the Mustangs put together a stronger 33-yard drive, but a series of incompletions forced yet another punt from Chase Hover. The Aggies' next drive was the most disastrous of the game, with a 7-yard Manziel sack by Margus Hunt and a False Start penalty, giving the drive a net gain of −12 yards. On SMU's next drive, Gilbert was sacked by DE Julien Obioha and fumbled the ball into the hands of SMU OL Ben Gottschalk for a loss of 5. With the ball back, Manziel completed a 38-yard pass to Mike Evans who bounced off of tackles to go down to the SMU 42-yard line. After failing to be able to run the ball, A&M attempted to convert a 4th and 2, but Manziel's pass to Malcome Kennedy was incomplete. After the Mustangs' offense was again stopped, they ended the quarter with a punt to A&M's Dustin Harris, who made a return for 20 yards before Kevin Pope forced a fumble into the hands of the Aggies' RB Trey Williams, who made an additional 17 yards on the return. The defense-dominated 1st Quarter ended at 0–0.

In the beginning of the 2nd Quarter, it looked as if the A&M offense was finally threatening, with Manziel completing another long 30-yard pass down the right sideline to Mike Evans at the SMU 12. Unable to convert, however, the Aggies had to kick a short field goal from the 5, but freshman Taylor Bertolet missed the 23-yarder. After holding SMU to 9 yards and a punt, A&M seemed to struggle on offense again, until Manziel completed a 22-yard pass to Evans on 4th and 4. They finally started to click, and a few plays later Manziel completed a slant to senior WR Ryan Swope who split the safeties and gave A&M the first points of the game on a 29-yard TD. After a pair of SMU punts, Manziel started the drive with a 48-yard scramble TD, but Bertolet's PAT was blocked by Hunt. Only 3 plays later Aggie DB Tramain Jacobs intercepted Garrett Gilbert to let the Aggies go on a 7-play, 73-yard drive capped off by a 26-yard TD pass slung on the run by Manziel to senior WR Uzoma Nwachukwu. After driving 44 yards, the Mustangs attempted a field goal but Chase Hover missed the 48-yarder to end the half with Texas A&M leading 20–0.

The Aggies forced a punt on SMU's first possession of the half. Back on offense the Aggies drove 37 yards, when, on 3rd and 9, Manziel shook off a would-be sack and threw an off-balance pass to Kenric McNeal, who avoided defenders to take the pass into the end zone for a 42-yard TD. On the Mustangs' next possession they drove 67 yards and scored their only points of the game on a Hover 25-yard field goal. On the ensuing drive, the Aggie offense continued to roll when Manziel ran for 25 yards and a 15-yard TD. For SMU, Gilbert was sacked by Moore, and then Dustin Harris returned the following punt for 36 yards. Later, Manziel connected with Nwachukwu for a 12-yard TD to extend the lead. The Mustangs finished the half down 41–3.

In the 4th Quarter the Aggies subbed in the 2nd string offense. Quarterback Jameill Showers led the offense 80 yards down field (with impressive passes to Thomas Johnson for 15 and 22 yards) and Trey Williams scored on a 2-yard run. The Aggies forced a punt and took time off the clock. To finish out the half, A&M held SMU to a turnover on downs and took the rest of the time off the clock to finish the game 48–3.

Johnny Manziel finished 20-of-36 for 294 yards and 4 TDs. He also rushed for an impressive 124 yards on 13 carries and 2 TDs. Evans and Swope had 6 catches for 123 yards and 5 catches for 70 yards and 1 TD, respectively. Damontre Moore had 2.0 sacks for a loss of 14. The victory improved A&M's all-time record against SMU to 43–29–7. Sumlin's Aggies seemed to be heating up, and the offense was looking more and more explosive being led by Manziel.

=== South Carolina State ===
Team	1	2	3	4	Total
Bulldogs	7	0	0	7	14
• Aggies	14	35	7	14	70

- Location: Kyle Field
  College Station, Texas
- Game start: 6:07 p.m.
- Elapsed time: 3:12
- Game attendance: 86,775
- Game weather: 94°, clear, winds SE at 6 mph
- Referee: Matt Austin
- TV announcers (FSN): Bob Rathbun (play-by-play), Tim Couch (commentary), Elizabeth Moreau (sideline reporter)
- Sources:
- Official Texas A&M Game Notes (PDF)

Scoring summary
1	8:39	Texas A&M	Ben Malena 4 Yard Run (Taylor Bertolet Kick)	Texas A&M 7–0
1	3:22	Texas A&M	Uzoma Nwachukwu 9 Yard Pass From Johnny Manziel (Taylor Bertolet Kick)	Texas A&M 14–0
1	0:35	SC State	Jalen Simmons 17 Yd Run (Nick Belcher Kick)	Texas A&M 14–7
2	12:02	Texas A&M	Johnny Manziel 39 Yard Run (Taylor Bertolet Kick)	Texas A&M 21–7
2	8:10	Texas A&M	Johnny Manziel 20 Yard Run (Taylor Bertolet Kick)	Texas A&M 28–7
2	5:24	Texas A&M	Kenric McNeal 30 Yard Pass From Johnny Manziel (Taylor Bertolet Kick)	Texas A&M 35–7
2	3:05	Texas A&M	Uzoma Nwachukwu 37 Yard Pass From Johnny Manziel (Taylor Bertolet Kick)	Texas A&M 42–7
2	1:20	Texas A&M	Ben Malena 50 Yd Run (Taylor Bertolet Kick)	Texas A&M 49–7
3	8:18	Texas A&M	Dustin Harris 96 Yard Punt Return (Taylor Bertolet Kick)	Texas A&M 56–7
4	14:50	Texas A&M	Christine Michael 5 Yard Run (Taylor Bertolet Kick)	Texas A&M 63–7
4	12:09	SC State	Lennel Elmore 39 Yard Pass From Richard Cue (Nick Belcher Kick)	Texas A&M 63–14
4	7:16	Texas A&M	Deshazor Everett 22 Yd Interception Return (Taylor Bertolet Kick)	Texas A&M 70–14

Statistics	SCST	TAMU
First downs	11	23
Total yards	223	448
Rushing yards	34	265
Passing yards	189	183
Turnovers	1	1
Time of possession	32:25	27:35

Team	Category	Player	Statistics
South Carolina State	Passing	Richard Cue	17/32, 189 yards, TD, INT
South Carolina State	Rushing	Jalen Simmons	7 rushes, 20 yards, TD
South Carolina State	Receiving	Lennel Elmore	2 receptions, 51 yards, TD
Texas A&M	Passing	Johnny Manziel	15/20, 174 yards, 3 TD
Texas A&M	Rushing	Ben Malena	11 rushes, 88 yards, 2 TD
Texas A&M	Receiving	Uzoma Nwachukwu	2 receptions, 46 yards, 2 TD

After a convincing win over SMU, the Aggies took on non-conference opponent and FCS team South Carolina State. The Bulldogs were 1–2 heading into the competition, and the Aggies 1–1.

The Aggies took the field on offense first and started strong, but stalled out after a −2-yard run by Ryan Swope and a sack on Manziel by Justin Hughes. SC State's first drive yielded 0 yards and resulted in a punt by Nick Belcher. After a 19-yard return from A&M senior DB Dustin Harris, the Aggies started their drive on the SC State 33-yard line. They ran the ball successfully, and scored the first touchdown of the game on a 4-yard run by Ben Malena. The teams traded a few punts before the ball was back in the hands of Manziel and the A&M offense. The Aggies worked downfield, and Johnny Manziel capped off the drive by flipping 9-yard TD pass on the run to Uzoma Nwachukwu. When SC State went back on offense, they finally moved the ball effectively and had an explosive 17-yard run by Jalen Simmons for their first touchdown.

Texas A&M began the 2nd Quarter with a punt after struggling on offense, but it would be their last punt for the next 5 series. Following an unsuccessful drive by SC State, the Aggies had an explosive possession, highlighted by a 39-yard TD scramble by Manziel. After another Bulldog punt, the A&M offense exploded again. This time including a 23-yard pass to Thomas Johnson and yet another Manziel scramble, in which he went 20 yards and dove inside the right pylon for the touchdown. Once again South Carolina State failed to get a 1st down, and the Aggies had another great drive capped off by Johnny Manziel zipping a pass to Kenric McNeal for a 30-yard TD. The Bulldogs had to punt again, and after a 35-yard return from Dustin Harris, the Aggies had the ball. On the first play of the drive Manziel tossed a screen pass to Nwachukwu, who hurdled a defender and went 37 yards for the TD. After forcing another punt (the Bulldogs' 5th in a row), A&M's offense had the ball with 2:08 left in the half. However, it was only about 30 seconds until Manziel handed the ball off to Ben Malena, who exploded up the middle, broke a tackle, and went for a 50-yard touchdown. The Aggies scored an incredible 35 points in the 2nd Quarter, and headed to halftime in the lead 49–7.

South Carolina State opened up the 2nd half on offense with a 16-yard drive which stalled out and ended with a punt. The Aggies came into the half playing much of the 2nd string offense, including QB Jameill Showers. Showers threw 2 incomplete passes, and then an interception to Dominique Mitchell. However, when SC State had the ball, they once again could not get a first down and were forced to punt. Nick Belcher made a rugby style punt to the A&M 4-yard line. The ball was picked up by Dustin Harris, who swung to the right side of the field, cut through defenders, and sprinted up the right sideline for a 96-yard touchdown return (The 2nd longest in school history). The Bulldogs punted on their next possession, and the 2nd string Aggie offense went to work. They worked methodically worked their way down to the SC State 5-yard line to end the 3rd Quarter in the lead 56–7.

A&M began the 4th quarter with a 4th and 1 from the SC State 5-yard line. Showers handed the ball off to Christine Michael, who ran up the middle and pounded through SC State linebacker Joe Thomas for a 5-yard TD. When the Bulldogs got the ball back, they finally found success in the passing game: a 27-yard completion to Marcus Lloyd and a 39-yard touchdown throw to Lennel Elmore, which gave SC State their first points since the 1st Quarter. The Aggies returned on offense giving experience to younger players, and ran 9 plays before turning the ball over on downs. On the first play of the ensuing drive for SC State, QB Richard Cue attempted to find TE Temarrick Hemingway, but sophomore Aggie DB Deshazor Everett jumped the route, picked off the ball, and ran it 22 yards for the touchdown. On the following SC State possession, the Aggies played many 2nd string defenders who made some impressive plays including back-to-back sacks by Tyrell Taylor and Ivan Robinson. After moving the ball 30 yards, they punted to the Aggies, who ran out the last minute on the clock to win the game by a whopping 70–14.

The Aggies were led in passing by Manziel who completed 15 of 20 for 174 yards and 3 TDs, and led in rushing by Malena who had 11 carries for 88 yards and 2 TDs. He was followed closely by Manziel himself who had 8 attempts for 78 yards and 2 TDs. A&M was led in receiving by Nwachukwu and Johnson who had 2 receptions for 46 yards and 2 TDs and 3 receptions for 42 yards respectively. In addition, Dustin Harris broke both the school and 64-year standing SEC record for punt return yards in a game with 246 on 8 returns (an average of 30.75) while making the 2nd longest return in school history. Finally, Damontre Moore had 3 tackles for a loss including 1 sack. This was the first game Texas A&M ever played against South Carolina State, so their all-time record vs the Bulldogs is 1–0.

=== Arkansas ===
Team	1	2	3	4	Total
Razorbacks	10	0	0	0	10
• Aggies	7	20	17	14	58

- Location: Kyle Field
  College Station, Texas
- Game start: 11:21 a.m.
- Elapsed time: 3:42
- Game attendance: 86, 442
- Game weather: 76°, cloudy with light rain, winds S at 13 mph
- Referee: Hubert Owens
- TV announcers (SECN): Dave Neal (play-by-play), Andre Ware (commentary), Cara Capuano (sideline reporter)
- Sources:
- Official Texas A&M Game Notes (PDF)

Scoring summary
1	12:11	Texas A&M	Mike Evans 4 Yard Pass From Johnny Manziel (Taylor Bertolet Kick)	Texas A&M 7–0
1	6:45	Arkansas	Knile Davis 64 Yard Pass From Tyler Wilson (Zach Hocker Kick)	Tied 7–7
1	0:37	Arkansas	Zach Hocker 26 Yard Field Goal	Arkansas 10–7
2	12:44	Texas A&M	Taylor Bertolet 46 Yard Field Goal	Tied 10–10
2	8:07	Texas A&M	Taylor Bertolet 26 Yard Field Goal	Texas A&M 13–10
2	4:37	Texas A&M	Ben Malena 11 Yard Pass From Johnny Manziel (Taylor Bertolet Kick)	Texas A&M 20–10
2	2:31	Texas A&M	Ryan Swope 80 Yd Pass From Johnny Manziel (Taylor Bertolet Kick)	Texas A&M 27–10
3	11:20	Texas A&M	Taylor Bertolet 21 Yard Field Goal	Texas A&M 30–10
3	7:18	Texas A&M	Christine Michael 10 Yard Run (Taylor Bertolet Kick)	Texas A&M 37–10
3	7:06	Texas A&M	Tramain Jacobs 28 Yard Fumble Return (Taylor Bertolet Kick)	Texas A&M 44–10
4	10:23	Texas A&M	Johnny Manziel 6 Yard Run (Taylor Bertolet Kick)	Texas A&M 51–10
4	2:57	Texas A&M	Trey Williams 13 Yard Run (Taylor Bertolet Kick)	Texas A&M 58–10

Statistics	ARK	TAMU
First downs	25	32
Total yards	515	716
Rushing yards	142	218
Passing yards	373	498
Turnovers	3	0
Time of possession	32:00	28:00

Team	Category	Player	Statistics
Arkansas	Passing	Tyler Wilson	29/59, 373 yards, TD, 2 INT
Arkansas	Rushing	Knile Davis	18 rushes, 65 yards
Arkansas	Receiving	Cobi Hamilton	11 receptions, 162 yards
Texas A&M	Passing	Johnny Manziel	29/38, 453 yards, 3 TD
Texas A&M	Rushing	Johnny Manziel	14 rushes, 104 yards, TD
Texas A&M	Receiving	Ryan Swope	5 receptions, 141 yards, TD

The game featured the former Southwest Conference rivals in their first conference matchup since 1991 (Arkansas' last year in the SWC).

Though leading 10–7 after the first quarter, Arkansas would be shut out the remainder of the game in a blowout win for A&M. Johnny Manziel had a total of 453 yards passing and 104 yard rushing with a total of 3 touchdowns to lead the Aggies to a 58–10 win over Arkansas and led A&M to a 3–1 record.

=== At Ole Miss ===
Team	1	2	3	4	Total
• Aggies	7	10	0	13	30
Rebels	10	7	3	7	27

- Location: Vaught–Hemingway Stadium
  Oxford, Mississippi
- Game start: 6:00 p.m.
- Elapsed time: 3:25
- Game attendance: 55,343
- Game weather: 55°, clear, winds N at 7 mph
- Referee: Marc Curles
- TV announcers (ESPNU): Clay Matvick (play-by-play), Matt Stinchcomb (commentary), Angela Mallen (sideline reporter)
- Sources:
- Official Texas A&M Game Notes (PDF)

Scoring summary
1	14:11	Texas A&M	Ben Malena 59 Yard Run (Taylor Bertolet Kick)	Texas A&M 7–0
1	8:32	Ole Miss	Jeff Scott 1 Yard Run (Bryson Rose Kick)	Tied 7–7
1	6:07	Ole Miss	Bryson Rose 46 Yard Field Goal	Ole Miss 10–7
2	10:09	Texas A&M	Taylor Bertolet 19 Yard Field Goal	Tied 10–10
2	3:39	Ole Miss	Bo Wallace 14 Yard Run (Bryson Rose Kick)	Ole Miss 17–10
2	0:42	Texas A&M	Steven Jenkins 37 Yard Interception Return (Taylor Bertolet Kick)	Tied 17–17
3	7:36	Ole Miss	Bryson Rose 28 Yard Field Goal	Ole Miss 20–17
4	14:56	Ole Miss	Donte Moncrief 4 Yard Pass From Bo Wallace (Bryson Rose Kick)	Ole Miss 27–17
4	6:24	Texas A&M	Johnny Manziel 29 Yard Run (PAT Failed)	Ole Miss 27–23
4	1:46	Texas A&M	Ryan Swope 20 Yard Pass From Johnny Manziel (Taylor Bertolet Kick)	Texas A&M 30–27

Statistics	TAMU	MISS
First downs	24	24
Total yards	481	464
Rushing yards	290	159
Passing yards	191	305
Turnovers	6	2
Time of possession	26:38	33:22

Team	Category	Player	Statistics
Texas A&M	Passing	Johnny Manziel	17/26, 191 yards, TD, 2 INT
Texas A&M	Rushing	Ben Malena	18 rushes, 142 yards, TD
Texas A&M	Receiving	Mike Evans	8 receptions, 105 yards
Ole Miss	Passing	Bo Wallace	20/34, 305 yards, TD, 2 INT
Ole Miss	Rushing	Jeff Scott	21 rushes, 108 yards, TD
Ole Miss	Receiving	Vince Sanders	5 receptions, 81 yards

The matchup marked Texas A&M's first road game in its SEC history. Texas A&M led the all-time series 4–0, with the last meeting occurring in 1980. Ole Miss entered the matchup with a 3–2 record after a loss to No. 1 Alabama the previous week.

On the opening drive, Aggies running back Ben Malena scored on a 58-yard touchdown run. Ole Miss responded on its first drive with a 1-yard run by Jeff Scott. Christine Michael fumbled on A&M's next possession, forced by Cody Prewitt and recovered by Cameron Whigham, leading to a 46-yard field goal by Bryson Rose. The Aggies were then stopped just outside the red zone when Malena was stopped on a fourth-and-one attempt. After the defense forced a three-and-out, Johnny Manziel was intercepted by Dehendret Collins on the following drive. Following another Rebels punt, the Aggies tied the game on a 19-yard field goal by Taylor Bertolet. Rose later missed a go-ahead 40-yard field goal off the right crossbar on the Rebels’ next possession. Later in the second quarter, quarterback Bo Wallace connected with Randall Mackey for a 68-yard gain to set up Ole Miss in the red zone, and Wallace finished the drive with a 14-yard rushing touchdown. Manziel later found Ryan Swope for a 32-yard completion, but A&M suffered its third first-half turnover when Prewitt forced a fumble recovered by Trae Elston. Three plays later, Wallace was hit while attempting a pass and threw an interception to Steven Jenkins, who returned it 37 yards for a touchdown, tying the game 17–17 at halftime. A&M held a 278–273 advantage in total yards at the break.

On the Rebels’ first drive of the second half, Wallace led a 17-play, 80-yard drive that resulted in a 28-yard Rose field goal and consumed nearly half the quarter's clock. The drive featured three third-down conversions and a fourth-and-two conversion. On A&M's first drive, Manziel led the Aggies to the Ole Miss 3-yard line, including a 38-yard run. However, Manziel was sacked by Korvic Neat for a 13-yard loss, fumbled, and the ball was recovered by Joel Kight. On the ensuing Jim Broadway punt, Dustin Harris fumbled, with Ole Miss’ Prewitt recovering at the Texas A&M 5-yard line. On third-and-goal, Wallace connected with Donte Moncrief for a 4-yard touchdown, giving the Rebels a 27–17 lead with 14:56 remaining. Manziel was then intercepted by Prewitt on A&M's next drive, marking the Aggies’ sixth turnover of the game. Damontre Moore later sacked Wallace out of field goal range, forcing another Ole Miss punt. On the Aggies’ next possession, they converted a third-and-19 from their own 3-yard line when Mike Evans caught a 32-yard pass from Manziel. Malena followed with a 38-yard run, and Manziel scored a 29-yard rushing touchdown on the next play, though the extra point was missed. On Ole Miss’ next drive, they faced a fourth-and-one, and head coach Hugh Freeze elected to go for it. Jonathan Stewart stopped Scott at the line of scrimmage, giving the ball back to A&M at the 39-yard line with just over three minutes remaining. On third-and-three, Manziel connected with Swope for a 20-yard touchdown, giving the Aggies a 30–27 lead. Wallace later completed a 32-yard pass to Moncrief to the Texas A&M 32-yard line, but he was intercepted by Toney Hurd Jr. on the next play. With no timeouts remaining, Texas A&M was able to kneel out the clock.

The loss dropped Ole Miss to 3–3 and marked its eighth straight SEC home-opening defeat. Ole Miss defensive back Cody Prewitt recorded six tackles, one interception, two forced fumbles, and one fumble recovery. Texas A&M improved to 4–1, as the Aggies overcame six turnovers. Manziel finished 17-of-26 for 191 yards with one touchdown and two interceptions. He also rushed for a career-high 129 yards and one touchdown while losing one fumble.

=== At No. 23 Louisiana Tech ===
Team	1	2	3	4	Total
• No. 22 Aggies	21	18	7	13	59
No. 23 Bulldogs	0	16	14	27	57

- Location: Independence Stadium
  Shreveport, Louisiana
- Game start: 8:17 p.m.
- Elapsed time: 4:28
- Game attendance: 40,453
- Game weather: 78°, clear, winds S at 17 mph
- Referee: Penn Wagers
- TV announcers (ESPNU): Joe Davis (play-by-play), Kelly Stouffer (commentary), Cara Capuano (sideline reporter)
- Sources:
- Official Texas A&M Game Notes (PDF)

Scoring summary
1	13:10	Texas A&M	Christine Michael 40 Yard Run (Taylor Bertolet Kick)	Texas A&M 7–0
1	7:46	Texas A&M	LeKendrick Williams 20 Yard Pass From Johnny Manziel (Taylor Bertolet Kick)	Texas A&M 14–0
1	2:17	Texas A&M	Johnny Manziel 15 Yard Run (Taylor Bertolet Kick)	Texas A&M 21–0
2	12:40	Texas A&M	Taylor Bertolet 26 Yard Field Goal	Texas A&M 24–0
2	8:21	Texas A&M	Taylor Bertolet 54 Yard Field Goal	Texas A&M 27–0
2	5:32	LA Tech	Quinton Patton 11 Yard Pass From Colby Cameron (Matt Nelson Kick)	Texas A&M 27–7
2	5:20	Texas A&M	Mike Evans 75 Yard Pass From Johnny Manziel (Taylor Bertolet Kick)	Texas A&M 34–7
2	2:55	LA Tech	Kenneth Dixon 6 Yard Run (PAT Blocked)	Texas A&M 34–13
2	2:55	Texas A&M	Dustin Harris PAT Return	Texas A&M 36–13
2	0:45	Texas A&M	Taylor Bertolet 28 Yard Field Goal	Texas A&M 39–13
2	0:00	LA Tech	Matt Nelson 43 Yard Field Goal	Texas A&M 39–16
3	9:17	LA Tech	Quinton Patton 2 Yard Pass From Colby Cameron (Matt Nelson Kick)	Texas A&M 39–23
3	5:44	Texas A&M	Johnny Manziel 2 Yard Run (Taylor Bertolet Kick)	Texas A&M 46–23
3	2:53	LA Tech	Quinton Patton 5 Yard Pass From Colby Cameron (Matt Nelson Kick)	Texas A&M 46–30
4	12:29	LA Tech	Kenneth Dixon 22 Yard Run (Colby Cameron Run For Two-Point Conversion)	Texas A&M 46–38
4	11:59	LA Tech	Shakeil Lucas 5 Yard Interception Return (Two-Point Pass Conversion Failed)	Texas A&M 46–44
4	7:28	Texas A&M	Thomas Johnson 17 Yard Pass From Johnny Manziel (Taylor Bertolet Kick)	Texas A&M 53–44
4	2:04	Texas A&M	Johnny Manziel 72 Yard Run (PAT Failed)	Texas A&M 59–44
4	1:46	LA Tech	Quinton Patton 62 Yard Pass From Colby Cameron (Matt Nelson Kick)	Texas A&M 59–51
4	0:38	LA Tech	Ray Holley 13 Yard Pass From Colby Cameron (Two-Point Pass Conversion Failed)	Texas A&M 59–57

Statistics	TAMU	LT
First downs	27	37
Total yards	678	615
Rushing yards	283	165
Passing yards	395	450
Turnovers	2	0
Time of possession	32:13	27:47

Team	Category	Player	Statistics
Texas A&M	Passing	Johnny Manziel	24/40, 395 yards, 3 TD, INT
Texas A&M	Rushing	Johnny Manziel	19 rushes, 181 yards, 3 TD
Texas A&M	Receiving	Mike Evans	4 receptions, 137 yards, TD
Louisiana Tech	Passing	Colby Cameron	44/58, 450 yards, 5 TD
Louisiana Tech	Rushing	Kenneth Dixon	19 rushes, 111 yards, 2 TD
Louisiana Tech	Receiving	Quinton Patton	21 receptions, 233 yards, 4 TD

The game was originally scheduled for August 30, 2011. On August 28, 2012, the Louisiana Tech Athletic department announced that the game would be postponed to October 13, 2012 (previously a bye week for both teams) anticipating that Hurricane Isaac could make travel for the teams and fans difficult or that the game time weather could be hazardous.

=== No. 6 LSU ===
Team	1	2	3	4	Total
• No. 6 Tigers	0	14	0	10	24
No. 20 Aggies	9	3	0	7	19

- Location: Kyle Field
  College Station, Texas
- Game start: 11:00 a.m.
- Elapsed time: 4:00
- Game attendance: 87,429
- Game weather: 75°, clear, winds S at 11 mph
- Referee: Tom Ritter
- TV announcers (ESPN): Dave Pasch (play-by-play), Brian Griese (commentary), Jenn Brown (sideline reporter)
- Sources:
- Official Texas A&M Game Notes (PDF)

Scoring summary
1	10:46	Texas A&M	Christine Michael 2 Yard Run (PAT Failed)	Texas A&M 6–0
1	5:41	Texas A&M	Taylor Bertolet 32 Yard Field Goal	Texas A&M 9–0
2	7:24	Texas A&M	Taylor Bertolet 50 Yard Field Goal	Texas A&M 12–0
2	1:49	LSU	Michael Ford 20 Yard Run (Drew Alleman Kick)	Texas A&M 12–7
2	0:11	LSU	Kadron Boone 29 Yard Pass From Zach Mettenberger (Drew Alleman Kick)	LSU 14–12
4	8:35	LSU	Drew Alleman 28 Yard Field Goal	LSU 17–12
4	3:12	LSU	Jeremy Hill 47 Yard Run (Drew Alleman Kick)	LSU 24–12
4	1:17	Texas A&M	Ben Malena 5 Yard Run (Taylor Bertolet Kick)	LSU 24–19

Statistics	LSU	TAMU
First downs	18	26
Total yards	316	410
Rushing yards	219	134
Passing yards	97	276
Turnovers	0	5
Time of possession	29:50	30:10

Team	Category	Player	Statistics
LSU	Passing	Zach Mettenberger	11/29, 97 yards, TD
LSU	Rushing	Jeremy Hill	18 rushes, 127 yards, TD
LSU	Receiving	Kadron Boone	4 receptions, 49 yards, TD
Texas A&M	Passing	Johnny Manziel	29/56, 276 yards, 3 INT
Texas A&M	Rushing	Ben Malena	12 rushes, 82 yards, TD
Texas A&M	Receiving	Ryan Swope	10 receptions, 81 yards

=== At Auburn ===
Team	1	2	3	4	Total
• No. 22 Aggies	21	21	14	7	63
Tigers	0	7	14	0	21

- Location: Jordan–Hare Stadium
  Auburn, Alabama
- Game start: 6:08 p.m.
- Elapsed time: 3:00
- Game attendance: 85,119
- Game weather: 63°, partly cloudy, winds WNW at 12 mph
- Referee: Matt Austin
- TV announcers (ESPNU): Clay Matvick (play-by-play), Matt Stinchcomb (commentary), Angela Williams (sideline reporter)
- Sources:
- Official Texas A&M Game Notes (PDF)

Scoring summary
1	11:18	Texas A&M	Ryan Swope 16 Yard Pass From Johnny Manziel (Taylor Bertolet Kick)	Texas A&M 7–0
1	5:38	Texas A&M	Johnny Manziel 6 Yard Run (Taylor Bertolet Kick)	Texas A&M 14–0
1	2:02	Texas A&M	Ryan Swope 19 Yard Pass From Johnny Manziel (Taylor Bertolet Kick)	Texas A&M 21–0
2	13:45	Texas A&M	Christine Michael 34 Yard Run (Taylor Bertolet Kick)	Texas A&M 28–0
2	9:10	Auburn	Tre Mason 1 Yard Run (Cody Parkey Kick)	Texas A&M 28–7
2	5:22	Texas A&M	Johnny Manziel 2 Yard Run (Taylor Bertolet Kick)	Texas A&M 35–7
2	1:25	Texas A&M	Ben Malena 7 Yard Run (Taylor Bertolet Kick)	Texas A&M 42–7
3	12:03	Texas A&M	Johnny Manziel 20 Yard Run (Taylor Bertolet Kick)	Texas A&M 49–7
3	9:47	Auburn	C. J. Uzomah 27 Yard Pass From Jonathan Wallace (Cody Parkey Kick)	Texas A&M 49–14
3	4:31	Texas A&M	Trey Williams 1 Yard Run (Taylor Bertolet Kick)	Texas A&M 56–14
3	1:33	Auburn	Emory Blake 27 Yard Pass From Jonathan Wallace (Cody Parkey Kick)	Texas A&M 56–21
4	6:27	Texas A&M	Malcome Kennedy 2 Yd Pass From Jameill Showers (Josh Lambo Kick)	Texas A&M 63–21

Statistics	TAMU	AUB
First downs	34	18
Total yards	671	335
Rushing yards	352	124
Passing yards	319	211
Turnovers	0	0
Time of possession	29:44	30:16

Team	Category	Player	Statistics
Texas A&M	Passing	Johnny Manziel	16/23, 260 yards, 2 TD
Texas A&M	Rushing	Trey Williams	19 rushes, 109 yards, TD
Texas A&M	Receiving	Ryan Swope	6 receptions, 140 yards, 2 TD
Auburn	Passing	Jonathan Wallace	6/9, 122 yards, 2 TD
Auburn	Rushing	Tre Mason	12 rushes, 80 yards, TD
Auburn	Receiving	Emory Blake	5 receptions, 106 yards, TD

=== At No. 17 Mississippi State ===
Team	1	2	3	4	Total
• No. 16 Aggies	14	10	7	7	38
No. 17 Bulldogs	0	0	7	6	13

- Location: Davis Wade Stadium
  Starkville, Mississippi
- Game start: 11:01 a.m.
- Elapsed time: 3:10
- Game attendance: 55,240
- Game weather: 72°, clear, winds WSW at 5 mph
- Referee: Matt Loeffler
- TV announcers (ESPN): Brad Nessler (play-by-play), Todd Blackledge (commentary), Holly Rowe (sideline reporter)
- Sources:
- Official Texas A&M Game Notes (PDF)

Scoring summary
1	9:16	Texas A&M	Ben Malena 1 Yard Run (Taylor Bertolet Kick)	Texas A&M 7–0
1	3:11	Texas A&M	Christine Michael 22 Yard Run (Taylor Bertolet Kick)	Texas A&M 14–0
2	11:51	Texas A&M	Johnny Manziel 37 Yard Run (Taylor Bertolet Kick)	Texas A&M 21–0
2	2:53	Texas A&M	Taylor Bertolet 24 Yard Field Goal	Texas A&M 24–0
3	12:40	Texas A&M	Christine Michael 1 Yard Run (Taylor Bertolet Kick)	Texas A&M 31–0
3	8:01	Miss State	Chad Bumphis 14 Yard Pass From Tyler Russell (Devon Bell Kick)	Texas A&M 31–7
4	9:11	Miss State	Tyler Russell 4 Yard Run (Two-Point Pass Conversion Failed)	Texas A&M 31–13
4	5:59	Texas A&M	Johnny Manziel 8 Yard Run (Taylor Bertolet Kick)	Texas A&M 38–13

Statistics	TAMU	MSST
First downs	36	15
Total yards	693	310
Rushing yards	361	98
Passing yards	332	212
Turnovers	1	1
Time of possession	32:46	27:14

Team	Category	Player	Statistics
Texas A&M	Passing	Johnny Manziel	30/36, 311 yards
Texas A&M	Rushing	Johnny Manziel	21 rushes, 129 yards, 2 TD
Texas A&M	Receiving	Ryan Swope	9 receptions, 121 yards
Mississippi State	Passing	Tyler Russell	19/30, 212 yards, TD, INT
Mississippi State	Rushing	LaDarius Perkins	13 rushes, 42 yards
Mississippi State	Receiving	Arceto Clark	5 receptions, 64 yards

In honor of the 2000 Independence Bowl (dubbed "The Snow Bowl" due to a freak snowstorm that hit the Shreveport area before game time, which was the last game between the two schools), Mississippi State received a waiver to wear all white uniforms despite being the home team. In response to the Mississippi State uniforms, Adidas (the uniform provider for both teams) approached A&M head coach Kevin Sumlin with the idea of an all-black uniform for the Aggies. The uniform configuration unveiled to the team as a surprise in the locker room before the game.

=== At No. 1 Alabama ===
Team	1	2	3	4	Total
• No. 15 Aggies	20	0	0	9	29
No. 1 Crimson Tide	0	14	3	7	24

- Location: Bryant–Denny Stadium
  Tuscaloosa, Alabama
- Game start: 2:46 p.m.
- Elapsed time: 3:29
- Game attendance: 101,821
- Game weather: 72°, clear, winds SSE at 9 mph
- Referee: Tom Ritter
- TV announcers (CBS): Verne Lundquist (play-by-play), Gary Danielson (commentary), Tracy Wolfson (sideline reporter)
- Sources:
- Official Texas A&M Game Notes (PDF)

Scoring summary
1	10:34	Texas A&M	Christine Michael 1 Yard Run (Taylor Bertolet Kick)	Texas A&M 7–0
1	7:59	Texas A&M	Ryan Swope 10 Yard Pass From Johnny Manziel (Taylor Bertolet Kick)	Texas A&M 14–0
1	0:41	Texas A&M	Christine Michael 1 Yard Run (PAT Failed)	Texas A&M 20–0
2	10:04	Alabama	T. J. Yeldon 2 Yard Run (Jeremy Shelley Kick)	Texas A&M 20–7
2	0:19	Alabama	Eddie Lacy 2 Yard Run (Jeremy Shelley Kick)	Texas A&M 20–14
3	4:56	Alabama	Jeremy Shelley 28 Yard Field Goal	Texas A&M 20–17
4	14:16	Texas A&M	Taylor Bertolet 29 Yard Field Goal	Texas A&M 23–17
4	8:37	Texas A&M	Malcome Kennedy 24 Yard Pass From Johnny Manziel (Two-Point Conversion Failed)	Texas A&M 29–17
4	6:09	Alabama	Amari Cooper 54 Yard Pass From A. J. McCarron (Jeremy Shelley Kick)	Texas A&M 29–24

Statistics	TAMU	ALA
First downs	23	17
Total yards	418	431
Rushing yards	165	122
Passing yards	253	309
Turnovers	0	2
Time of possession	32:27	27:33

Team	Category	Player	Statistics
Texas A&M	Passing	Johnny Manziel	24/31, 253 yards, 2 TD
Texas A&M	Rushing	Johnny Manziel	18 rushes, 92 yards
Texas A&M	Receiving	Ryan Swope	11 receptions, 111 yards, TD
Alabama	Passing	A. J. McCarron	21/34, 309 yards, TD, 2 INT
Alabama	Rushing	Eddie Lacy	16 rushes, 92 yards, TD
Alabama	Receiving	Amari Cooper	6 receptions, 136 yards, TD

The game featured the No. 15-ranked 7–2 Aggies against the No. 1-ranked 9–0 Alabama Crimson Tide. Texas A&M and Alabama have a long history of football coaches serving at both schools, including Bear Bryant, Gene Stallings, and Dennis Franchione. Although the programs had met four previous times, this was Texas A&M's first-ever trip to Tuscaloosa. It was also the Aggies' 12th game against the nation's No. 1-ranked team. Alabama entered the matchup leading the all-time series 3–1, with Texas A&M's lone victory coming in the 1968 Cotton Bowl Classic. The Crimson Tide were coming off a 21–17 victory over No. 5 LSU, winning on a go-ahead touchdown in the game's final minute. Quarterback A. J. McCarron entered the contest with a 21–1 career record as Alabama's starting quarterback and had thrown for 1,849 yards, 19 touchdowns, and no interceptions during the season.

Alabama won the toss and elected to receive, but opened the game with a three-and-out. Texas A&M quickly capitalized, scoring on a 1-yard touchdown run by Christine Michael after a drive highlighted by a 29-yard scramble from quarterback Johnny Manziel. It marked the 10th game that season in which the Aggies scored first. On Alabama's next possession, Howard Matthews delivered a hit on wide receiver Kenny Bell that deflected the ball into the hands of Sean Porter for an interception, ending McCarron's streak of 292 consecutive pass attempts without an interception. The Aggies immediately took advantage as Manziel connected with Kenric McNeal for 32 yards to set up first-and-goal. On third down, Manziel escaped pressure, momentarily lost the ball, recovered it, rolled to his left, and threw across his body to Ryan Swope for a 10-yard touchdown pass. Following another Alabama punt, Texas A&M marched 73 yards in 14 plays, capped by Michael's second 1-yard touchdown run of the quarter. Although the extra point was missed, the Aggies led 20–0 at the end of the first quarter. Through Alabama's first nine games, the Crimson Tide had allowed just six first-quarter points while outscoring opponents 104–6. Alabama answered with a 13-play, 75-yard drive that included a successful fourth-and-four conversion and ended with a 2-yard touchdown run by T. J. Yeldon. Texas A&M's next possession ended on a failed fourth-and-six after Manziel's scramble came up one yard short of the first down marker. The Crimson Tide responded with a 10-play, 67-yard drive that ended with an Eddie Lacy 2-yard touchdown run in the final minute of the half, cutting the deficit to 20–14. At halftime, Manziel had completed 15 of 16 passes for 118 yards and one touchdown while adding 82 rushing yards.

Both teams opened the second half with three-and-outs. Texas A&M then punted from deep in its own territory, giving Alabama possession near midfield. The Aggies' defense limited the Crimson Tide to a 28-yard Jeremy Shelley field goal. Texas A&M responded with a methodical 16-play, 63-yard drive that ended with a 29-yard Taylor Bertolet field goal, extending the lead to 23–17 with 14:16 remaining. After forcing another Alabama three-and-out, the Aggies missed an opportunity to add to their lead when Bertolet's 37-yard field goal attempt was no good. Alabama then drove into Texas A&M territory, highlighted by a 50-yard completion from McCarron to Amari Cooper, but Yeldon fumbled on the next play after being stripped by Steven Terrell, with Dustin Harris recovering for the Aggies. Texas A&M capitalized immediately, as Manziel found Swope for a 42-yard gain on a wheel route before connecting with Malcome Kennedy for a 24-yard touchdown on a corner route on the following play, covering 66 yards in just 33 seconds of game time. Manziel's two-point conversion attempt intended for Mike Evans was incomplete, leaving Texas A&M ahead 29–17 with 8:37 remaining. Alabama answered with a nine-play, 94-yard drive, capped by a 54-yard touchdown pass from McCarron to Cooper to cut the deficit to 29–24. Following an Aggies three-and-out, the Crimson Tide took over at their own 40-yard line with under five minutes remaining. McCarron connected with Bell for 54 yards on the opening play of the drive, giving Alabama first-and-goal. Facing fourth-and-goal from the Texas A&M 2-yard line, McCarron's pass intended for Bell was intercepted by Deshazor Everett. Texas A&M then attempted to run out the clock behind three consecutive carries by Ben Malena, setting up fourth-and-one with under a minute remaining. Alabama was penalized for a neutral zone infraction before the snap while the Aggies were in punt formation, giving Texas A&M a first down and allowing the Aggies to kneel out the remaining time.

The victory gave Texas A&M its second all-time win over a No. 1-ranked team and its first since defeating Oklahoma in 2002. Manziel finished 24-of-31 passing for 253 yards and two touchdowns while adding 92 rushing yards. The victory propelled Manziel into the national spotlight and firmly established him as a leading candidate for the 2012 Heisman Trophy, which he ultimately won. Swope recorded 11 receptions for 111 yards and a touchdown, becoming Texas A&M's career receptions leader, surpassing Jeff Fuller’s previous record of 233 receptions set from 2008–11. Alabama finished the season 13–1 and won the 2013 BCS National Championship Game by defeating Notre Dame, with the loss to Texas A&M standing as its only defeat of the season.

=== No. 3 (FCS) Sam Houston State ===
Team	1	2	3	4	Total
No. 3 (FCS) Bearkats	0	0	7	21	28
• No. 9 Aggies	7	27	13	0	47

- Location: Kyle Field
  College Station, Texas
- Game start: 2:30 p.m.
- Elapsed time: 3:18
- Game attendance: 87,101
- Game weather: 66°, clear, winds ESE at 1 mph
- Referee: Ken Williamson
- TV announcers (FSNPPV): Ralph Strangis (play-by-play), Shea Walker (commentary), Will Johnson (sideline reporter)
- Sources:
- Official Texas A&M Game Notes (PDF)

Scoring summary
1	10:17	Texas A&M	Mike Evans 7 Yard Pass From Johnny Manziel (Taylor Bertolet Kick)	Texas A&M 7–0
2	10:43	Texas A&M	Mike Evans 10 Yard Pass From Johnny Manziel (Taylor Bertolet Kick)	Texas A&M 14–0
2	4:11	Texas A&M	Johnny Manziel 4 Yd Run (Manziel PAT Failed)	Texas A&M 20–0
2	1:49	Texas A&M	Trey Williams 6 Yard Run (Taylor Bertolet Kick)	Texas A&M 27–0
2	1:24	Texas A&M	Johnny Manziel 1 Yard Run (Taylor Bertolet Kick)	Texas A&M 34–0
3	13:34	Texas A&M	Uzoma Nwachukwu 89 Yard Pass From Johnny Manziel (PAT Failed)	Texas A&M 40–0
3	10:41	Texas A&M	LeKendrick Williams 80 Yard Pass From Jameill Showers (Taylor Bertolet Kick)	Texas A&M 47–0
3	1:08	SHSU	Tim Flanders 2 Yard Run (Miguel Antonio Kick)	Texas A&M 47–7
4	14:20	SHSU	K.J. Williams 9 Yard Pass From Brian Bell (Miguel Antonio Kick)	Texas A&M 47–14
4	5:37	SHSU	Ridgeway Frank 1 Yard Run (Miguel Antonio Kick)	Texas A&M 47–21
4	2:40	SHSU	Chris Grett 5 Yard Run (Miguel Antonio Kick)	Texas A&M 47–28

Statistics	SHSU	TAMU
First downs	22	22
Total yards	382	527
Rushing yards	191	157
Passing yards	191	370
Turnovers	2	4
Time of possession	41:01	18:59

Team	Category	Player	Statistics
Sam Houston State	Passing	Brian Bell	14/30, 150 yards, TD, INT
Sam Houston State	Rushing	Tim Flanders	21 rushes, 64 yards, TD
Sam Houston State	Receiving	Trey Diller	6 receptions, 74 yards
Texas A&M	Passing	Johnny Manziel	14/20, 267 yards, 3 TD, INT
Texas A&M	Rushing	Johnny Manziel	16 rushes, 100 yards, 2 TD
Texas A&M	Receiving	Uzoma Nwachukwu	4 receptions, 160 yards, TD

The matchup featured the 8–2 Texas A&M Aggies against the No. 3 FCS Sam Houston State Bearkats. Texas A&M entered the game one week after its historic 29–24 road victory over No. 1 Alabama, the program's second win over a No. 1-ranked team. The Aggies also held a perfect 10–0 all-time record against Sam Houston State, having won the previous meeting 59–6 in 1997. The Bearkats entered the contest on a seven-game winning streak with an 8–2 record. Their only other game against an FBS opponent that season came in mid-September, when they lost 48–23 to Baylor, after leading 20–10 at halftime.

Texas A&M opened the game by converting a fourth-and-one inside the Bearkats' 10-yard line when running back Christine Michael picked up the first down. On the next play, quarterback Johnny Manziel connected with Mike Evans for a 7-yard touchdown, accounting for the only points of the first quarter. Early in the second quarter, Manziel found Evans again on third-and-eight for a 10-yard touchdown, their second scoring connection of the game. Following the play, however, Michael was ejected after being assessed a disqualification penalty for throwing a punch. After forcing a Sam Houston State punt, Manziel was intercepted. The Bearkats were unable to capitalize, as quarterback Brian Bell was intercepted by linebacker Donnie Baggs a few plays later, giving Texas A&M favorable field position. Facing third-and-one from the 4-yard line, the Aggies called a designed option to the right. After faking a pitch, Manziel reversed field and eluded three defenders for a 4-yard touchdown run, though the ensuing extra-point attempt was unsuccessful. Following another Bearkats punt, Trey Williams extended the lead with a 6-yard touchdown run. On Sam Houston State's next possession, defensive captain and linebacker Sean Porter forced and recovered a fumble, giving the Aggies possession deep in Bearkats territory with under two minutes remaining in the half. Two plays later, after a 19-yard completion to Uzoma Nwachukwu, Manziel scored on a 1-yard touchdown run to give Texas A&M a 34–0 halftime lead.

Following a Sam Houston State punt to open the second half, Manziel connected with Nwachukwu for an 89-yard touchdown on Texas A&M's first offensive play. Nwachukwu finished with a game-high 160 receiving yards. Manziel then attempted the extra point, which sailed wide right, marking the only extra-point attempt of his Texas A&M career. On the ensuing Sam Houston State punt, backup quarterback Jameill Showers replaced Manziel as the Aggies began substituting reserves. On the first play of the drive, Showers found LeKendrick Williams for an 80-yard touchdown. Sam Houston State answered with an 18-play, 75-yard drive capped by Tim Flanders' 2-yard touchdown run. The Bearkats then recovered a surprise onside kick and capitalized when Brian Bell threw a 9-yard touchdown pass to KJ Williams early in the fourth quarter. Later in the quarter, Sam Houston State scored its third consecutive touchdown after converting a fourth-and-eight, with Frank Ridgeway finishing the drive on a 1-yard touchdown run. On the Aggies' ensuing possession, Williams fumbled after crossing midfield, leading to another Bearkats score. Backup quarterback Chris Grett added a 5-yard touchdown run with under three minutes remaining, completing a stretch of 28 unanswered points. Sam Houston State recovered its second onside kick of the game but was unable to score before time expired.

The victory gave head coach Kevin Sumlin his ninth win of the season, setting a Texas A&M record for the most victories by a first-year head coach and surpassing the previous mark of eight wins established by Dana X. Bible in 1917 and R. C. Slocum in 1989. Manziel completed the game with 267 passing yards and three touchdowns while adding 100 rushing yards and two rushing touchdowns. His 367 yards of total offense increased his season total to 4,161, breaking Jerrod Johnson's school record of 4,085 total yards set in 2009. He also extended his streak to eight consecutive games with at least 300 yards of total offense. The loss snapped Sam Houston State's seven-game winning streak heading into the 2012 FCS playoffs, while Texas A&M improved to 11–0 all-time against the Bearkats.

=== Missouri ===
Team	1	2	3	4	Total
Tigers	0	7	9	13	29
• No. 9 Aggies	21	21	10	7	59

- Location: Kyle Field
  College Station, Texas
- Game start: 6:08 p.m.
- Elapsed time: 3:50
- Game attendance: 87,222
- Game weather: 61°, clear, winds ENE at 3 mph
- Referee: Matt Loeffler
- TV announcers (ESPN2): Steve Levy (play-by-play), Ed Cunningham (commentary), Kaylee Hartung (sideline reporter)
- Sources:
- Official Texas A&M Game Notes (PDF)

Scoring summary
1	12:47	Texas A&M	Christine Michael 1 Yard Run (Taylor Bertolet Kick)	Texas A&M 7–0
1	5:33	Texas A&M	Ben Malena 2 Yard Run (Taylor Bertolet Kick)	Texas A&M 14–0
1	3:20	Texas A&M	Christine Michael 38 Yard Run (Taylor Bertolet Kick)	Texas A&M 21–0
2	12:12	Texas A&M	Ryan Swope 4 Yard Pass From Johnny Manziel (Taylor Bertolet Kick)	Texas A&M 28–0
2	7:23	Texas A&M	Mike Evans 5 Yard Pass From Johnny Manziel (Taylor Bertolet Kick)	Texas A&M 35–0
2	3:33	Texas A&M	Uzoma Nwachukwu 8 Yard Pass From Johnny Manziel (Taylor Bertolet Kick)	Texas A&M 42–0
2	0:16	Missouri	Kendial Lawrence 4 Yard Run (Andrew Baggett Kick)	Texas A&M 42–7
3	10:43	Missouri	Andrew Baggett 43 Yard Field Goal	Texas A&M 42–10
3	6:39	Texas A&M	Johnny Manziel 18 Yard Run (Taylor Bertolet Kick)	Texas A&M 49–10
3	3:25	Texas A&M	Taylor Bertolet 50 Yard Field Goal	Texas A&M 52–10
3	2:29	Missouri	L'Damian Washington 74 Yard Pass From Corbin Berkstresser (PAT Failed)	Texas A&M 52–16
4	13:38	Missouri	Corbin Berkstresser 1 Yard Run (Andrew Baggett Kick)	Texas A&M 52–23
4	12:07	Texas A&M	Johnny Manziel 1 Yard Run (Taylor Bertolet Kick)	Texas A&M 59–23
4	7:15	Missouri	Dorial Green-Beckham 25 Yd Pass From Corbin Berkstresser (PAT Blocked)	Texas A&M 59–29

Statistics	MIZ	TAMU
First downs	21	33
Total yards	465	647
Rushing yards	189	237
Passing yards	276	410
Turnovers	2	1
Time of possession	29:53	30:07

Team	Category	Player	Statistics
Missouri	Passing	Corbin Berkstresser	20/38, 276 yards, 2 TD, INT
Missouri	Rushing	Kendial Lawrence	16 rushes, 87 yards, TD
Missouri	Receiving	L'Damian Washington	4 receptions, 98 yards, TD
Texas A&M	Passing	Johnny Manziel	32/44, 372 yards, 3 TD, INT
Texas A&M	Rushing	Johnny Manziel	12 rushes, 67 yards, 2 TD
Texas A&M	Receiving	Malcolme Kennedy	7 receptions, 110 yards

The matchup featured the 5–6 Missouri Tigers against the No. 9-ranked 9–2 Texas A&M Aggies in the regular-season finale, which also served as Senior Night for the Aggies. It was the 13th meeting between the schools, with Texas A&M leading the all-time series 7–5, although Missouri had won each of the previous three meetings. For the third consecutive season, the game was played in College Station. The Tigers were without starting quarterback James Franklin, who suffered a concussion in the previous week's loss to Syracuse, making redshirt freshman Corbin Berkstresser his fourth start of the season.

Missouri won the coin toss and deferred. Texas A&M scored on its opening possession as Johnny Manziel pitched to Christine Michael on a successful option play from the pistol formation for a 1-yard touchdown run. It marked the Aggies' ninth consecutive game with an opening-drive touchdown and their 12th straight game scoring first. After a Missouri punt, Texas A&M marched 87 yards in 15 plays, capped by a 2-yard touchdown run by Ben Malena. Following Missouri's three-and-out, Manziel injured his left knee on a 7-yard run and briefly left the game. Backup quarterback Jameill Showers entered, and on the next play Michael broke free for a 38-yard touchdown run. Manziel returned midway through the Aggies' next possession wearing a brace on his left knee. During the drive, he surpassed Cam Newton's Southeastern Conference single-season record for total offense, set in 2010, before completing a 4-yard touchdown pass to Ryan Swope to finish an 11-play, 89-yard drive. Missouri's next drive ended when Berkstresser completed a 22-yard pass to Marcus Lucas, who fumbled after being stripped by Steven Terrell. Toney Hurd Jr. recovered for Texas A&M near midfield after the turnover was upheld following replay review. The Aggies capitalized with a 5-yard touchdown pass from Manziel to Mike Evans. Following another Missouri punt, Manziel found Uzoma Nwachukwu for an 8-yard touchdown pass, his third touchdown pass of the first half. Missouri finally reached the end zone in the final minute of the half on a 4-yard touchdown run by Kendial Lawrence, a drive highlighted by a successful fake punt in which the punter rushed 20 yards on fourth-and-three. Texas A&M took a 42–7 lead into halftime.

Missouri opened the second half with a nine-play, 56-yard drive that ended with a 43-yard field goal by Andrew Baggett. Texas A&M answered on its ensuing possession as Manziel capped the drive with a 19-yard touchdown run. Following a Missouri punt, Taylor Bertolet extended the Aggies' lead with a 50-yard field goal. Missouri responded on its next possession when Berkstresser connected with L'Damian Washington for a 74-yard touchdown, although the extra point attempt was missed. Manziel was intercepted on Texas A&M's ensuing drive, setting up a 1-yard touchdown run by Berkstresser. The Aggies answered immediately as Manziel completed a 32-yard pass to the Missouri 1-yard line before scoring on a 1-yard touchdown run, his fifth total touchdown of the game. Following another Missouri punt, Manziel was replaced by Showers after the first play of the Aggies' next drive, receiving a standing ovation from the crowd. Missouri later capitalized after a punt return gave the Tigers possession in Texas A&M territory as Berkstresser threw a 25-yard touchdown pass to Dorial Green-Beckham, though the extra point attempt was blocked. In the closing minutes, Floyd Raven Sr. intercepted Berkstresser to seal Texas A&M's 59–29 victory.

The victory improved Texas A&M to 10–2, while Missouri fell to 5–7, missing bowl eligibility and ending its season.

=== Vs. No. 11 Oklahoma (Cotton Bowl Classic) ===
Team	1	2	3	4	Total
• No. 9 Aggies	7	7	20	7	41
No. 12 Sooners	3	10	0	0	13

- Location: Cowboys Stadium
  Arlington, Texas
- Game start: 7:10 p.m.
- Elapsed time: 3:31
- Game attendance: 87,025
- Game weather: 72°, indoors
- Referee: Tom Zimorski
- TV announcers (FOX): Gus Johnson (play-by-play), Charles Davis (commentary), Julie Alexandria (sideline reporter)
- Sources:
- Official Texas A&M Game Notes (PDF)

Scoring summary
1	12:21	Texas A&M	Johnny Manziel 23 Yard Run (Taylor Bertolet Kick)	Texas A&M 7–0
1	6:38	Oklahoma	Michael Hunnicutt 23 Yard Field Goal	Texas A&M 7–3
2	11:41	Oklahoma	Michael Hunnicutt 24 Yard Field Goal	Texas A&M 7–6
2	6:14	Texas A&M	Johnny Manziel 5 Yard Run (Taylor Bertolet Kick)	Texas A&M 14–6
2	1:16	Oklahoma	Justin Brown 6 Yard Pass From Landry Jones (Michael Hunnicutt Kick)	Texas A&M 14–13
3	10:26	Texas A&M	Ben Malena 7 Yard Run (Taylor Bertolet Kick)	Texas A&M 21–13
3	6:30	Texas A&M	Trey Williams 30 Yard Run (PAT Failed)	Texas A&M 27–13
3	3:55	Texas A&M	Ryan Swope 33 Yard Pass From Johnny Manziel (Taylor Bertolet Kick)	Texas A&M 34–13
4	9:03	Texas A&M	Uzoma Nwachukwu 34 Yard Pass From Johnny Manziel (Taylor Bertolet Kick)	Texas A&M 41–13

Statistics	TAMU	OKLA
First downs	28	27
Total yards	633	401
Rushing yards	326	123
Passing yards	307	278
Turnovers	1	1
Time of possession	23:31	36:29

Team	Category	Player	Statistics
Texas A&M	Passing	Johnny Manziel	22/34, 287 yards, 2 TD, INT
Texas A&M	Rushing	Johnny Manziel	17 rushes, 229 yards, 2 TD
Texas A&M	Receiving	Ryan Swope	8 receptions, 104 yards, TD
Oklahoma	Passing	Landry Jones	35/48, 278 yards, TD, INT
Oklahoma	Rushing	Brennan Clay	10 rushes, 44 yards
Oklahoma	Receiving	Kenny Stills	7 receptions, 67 yards
