= Jameill Showers =

American football player (born 1991)

No. 7, 28
- Positions: Quarterback, safety

Personal information
- Born: September 6, 1991 (age 35); Alpine, Texas, U.S.
- Listed height: 6 ft 2 in (1.88 m)
- Listed weight: 223 lb (101 kg)

Career information
- High school: Shoemaker (Killeen, Texas)
- College: Texas A&M (2010–2012); UTEP (2013–2014)
- NFL draft: 2015: undrafted

Career history
- Dallas Cowboys (2015–2019)
- Stats at Pro Football Reference

Jameill Lamonte Showers (born September 6, 1991) is an American former professional football quarterback and safety in the National Football League (NFL) for the Dallas Cowboys. He played college football at the University of Texas at El Paso.

== Early life ==
Showers attended Shoemaker High School in Killeen, Texas. As a junior, he registered 2,150 passing yards, 513 rushing yards and 22 touchdowns. He received District 12-5A First-team, District 12-5A Offensive MVP, Central Texas 4A/5A Offensive Player of the Year and honorable-mention All-state honors.

As a senior, he was lost for the year with a broken collarbone he suffered in a preseason scrimmage.

== College career ==
Showers accepted a football scholarship from Texas A&M University. As a redshirt freshman in 2011, he was the backup to Ryan Tannehill.

As a sophomore, he was the backup to eventual Heisman Trophy winner Johnny Manziel. Against Auburn University, he was 8-for-8 for 59 yards, including a two-yard touchdown pass.

In June 2013, he earned a bachelor's degree from Texas A&M. In his 2 seasons, he played in 11 games, making 31 out of 49 passes for 359 yards, 18 carries for 72 yards (4.0-yard avg.) and 2 passing touchdowns.

In February 2013, he transferred to the University of Texas at El Paso. As a junior, he was eligible to play immediately because he graduated from Texas A&M in June and was named the starter at quarterback. Although he missed the last 5 games due to a shoulder injury he suffered against Rice University on October 26, he still managed 1,263 passing yards, 11 touchdown passes, 4 interceptions, 195 rushing yards and 4 rushing touchdowns.

As a senior, he started all 13 games, registering 1,858 passing yards, 12 touchdown passes, 6 interceptions, 312 rushing yards and 4 rushing touchdowns.

=== Statistics ===
Season	Team	Games			Passing								Rushing			
Season	Team	GP	GS	Record	Cmp	Att	Pct	Yds	Y/A	TD	Int	Rtg	Att	Yds	Avg	TD
2010	Texas A&M	0	0	—	Redshirted (redshirt)											
2011	Texas A&M	4	0	—	4	5	80.0	40	8.0	0	0	147.2	9	33	3.7	1
2012	Texas A&M	7	0	—	27	44	61.4	319	7.3	2	1	132.7	9	39	4.3	0
2013	UTEP	7	7	1–6	107	188	56.9	1,263	6.7	11	4	128.4	62	195	3.1	4
2014	UTEP	13	13	7–6	159	286	55.6	1,858	6.5	12	6	119.8	93	312	3.4	4
Career		31	20	8–12	297	523	56.8	3,480	6.7	25	11	124.2	173	579	3.3	9

== Professional career ==
=== 2015 season ===
Showers was signed as an undrafted free agent by the Dallas Cowboys after the 2015 NFL draft on May 9. Although he passed for 125 yards, one touchdown and one interception in preseason, he made the coaches take notice with his special teams play and versatility on the scout team. On September 5, he was waived and signed to the practice squad two days later.

On December 25, he was promoted to the active roster along with defensive tackle Casey Walker, after the Cowboys placed tight end Gavin Escobar and quarterback Tony Romo on the injured reserve list. He was declared inactive in the last 2 games.

=== 2016 season ===
In 2016, he moved up on the depth chart when backup quarterback Kellen Moore broke his right tibia during the first week of training camp and the Cowboys couldn't reach an agreement with the Cleveland Browns to trade for backup Josh McCown.

After Moore's injury, he competed with rookie quarterback Dak Prescott for the backup job behind starter Romo. Several reports from August, indicated that Showers outperformed Prescott, showing greater accuracy and a quicker release in training camp. However, the Cowboys coaching staff made the decision to start Prescott in the team's preseason opener at the Los Angeles Rams. Working with the Cowboys' first-team offense, Prescott completed 10 of 12 passes for 139 yards and two touchdowns in one half of action. In that game Showers had a notable 45-yard pass to Vince Mayle, while escaping a certain sack, although Dallas would lose the game 28–24.

After Romo suffered a vertebral compression fracture during the first quarter of the Cowboys' Week 3 preseason game against the Seattle Seahawks, in light of Romo's projected 8- to 10-week recovery time, Prescott was named the starter for the beginning of the 2016 season. For the backup quarterback position, the Cowboys wanted to pair Prescott with a veteran, so they released Showers on September 4 to make room for Mark Sanchez, signing him to the practice squad the next day. On October 7, it was reported that Showers would be switching positions from quarterback to strong safety, in order to give him a better chance to make the team.

=== 2017 season ===
On January 16, 2017, he signed a reserve/future contract with the Cowboys. On September 2, 2017, Showers was waived by the Cowboys and was signed to the practice squad the next day. He was released on September 12, 2017, but was re-signed a week later.

=== 2018 season ===
On January 1, 2018, he signed a reserve/future contract with the Cowboys. He suffered a torn left ACL in the second preseason game against the Cincinnati Bengals and was placed on the injured reserve list on August 20.

=== 2019 season ===
On February 4, 2019, he was activated from the injured reserve. He was waived/injured with a hamstring injury during final roster cuts on August 31, 2019, and reverted to the team's injured reserve list the next day. He was waived from injured reserve with an injury settlement on September 9.
