= Sean Porter (American football) =

American football player (born 1991)

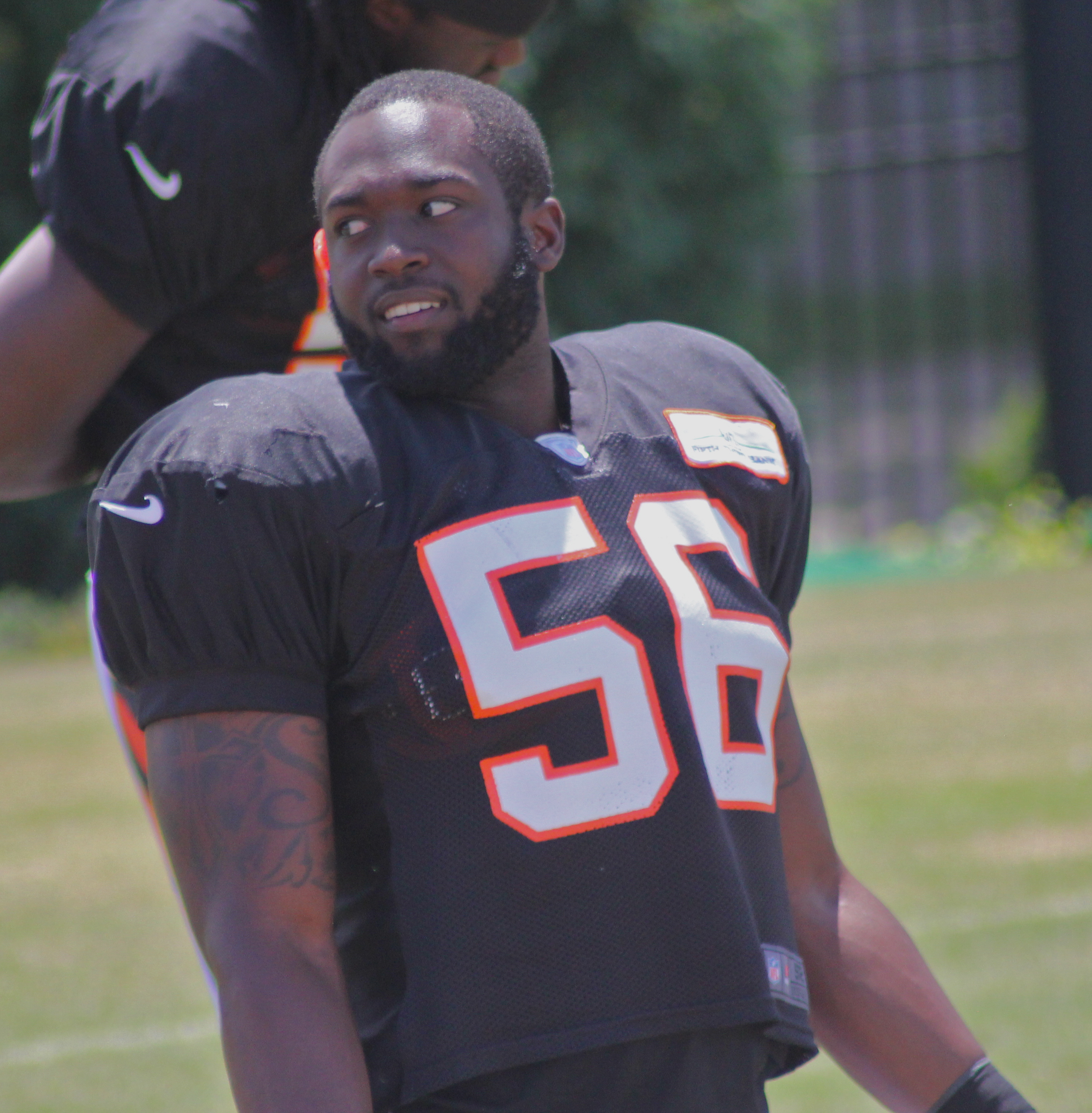
- Porter with the Cincinnati Bengals in 2013

No. 56, 53
- Position: Linebacker

Personal information
- Born: January 12, 1991 (age 35); Schertz, Texas, U.S.
- Listed height: 6 ft 1 in (1.85 m)
- Listed weight: 229 lb (104 kg)

Career information
- High school: Samuel Clemens (Schertz)
- College: Texas A&M
- NFL draft: 2013: 4th round, 118th overall pick

Career history
- Cincinnati Bengals (2013–2015); Jacksonville Jaguars (2015–2016); San Francisco 49ers (2017)*
- * Offseason or practice squad member only

Awards and highlights
- First-team All-Big 12 (2011)
- Stats at Pro Football Reference

Sean Porter (born January 12, 1991) is an American former professional football player who was a linebacker in the National Football League (NFL). He played college football for the Texas A&M Aggies, and was selected by the Cincinnati Bengals in the fourth round of the 2013 NFL draft.

== Early life ==
Porter was born in Schertz, Texas. He attended Samuel Clemens High School in Schertz, and played high school football for the Samuel Clemens Buffaloes. He earned first-team all-district (26-4A) honors at linebacker, and was named to the San Antonio Express-News All-Area second-team. As a junior in 2007, he recorded 137 tackles (85 solo), seven quarterback sacks, an interception, forced two fumbles and recovered three more. The following season, as a senior in 2008, he tallied 139 tackles, seven sacks, intercepted a pass and recovered a fumble.

Considered a three-star recruit by Rivals.com, he was rated the No. 61 outside linebacker in the nation. He accepted a scholarship offer from Texas A&M University over offers from Missouri and Houston.

== College career ==
Porter enrolled in Texas A&M University, where he played for the Texas A&M Aggies football team from 2009 to 2012. As a junior in 2011, he was a first-team All-Big 12 Conference selection.

=== College statistics ===
Year	Team	Games	Tackles				Sacks	Pass defense				Fumbles		Blkd	
Year	Team	Games	Solo	Ast	Total	TFL – Yds	No – Yds	Int – Yds	BU	PD	Qbh	Rcv – Yds	FF	Kick	Saf
2009	Texas A&M	13	23	19	42	4.0 – 9	1.0 – 5	0 – 0	0	0	1	0 – 0	0	0	0
2010	Texas A&M	13	37	37	74	7.0 – 20	0.5 – 2	0 – 0	6	0	1	0 – 0	0	0	0
2011	Texas A&M	13	50	29	79	17.0 – 93	9.5 – 74	0 – 0	2	2	6	1 – 0	1	0	0
2012	Texas A&M	13	38	28	66	6.5 – 42	3.5 – 31	1 – 16	4	5	3	1 – 0	1	0	0
Career		52	148	114	261	34.5 – 164	14.5 – 112	1 – 16	12	7	11	2 – 0	2	0	0

== Professional career ==
=== Cincinnati Bengals ===
He was selected by the Cincinnati Bengals in the fourth round (118th overall) of the 2013 NFL draft.

He signed with the Bengals on May 13, 2013. He spent his entire rookie season on injured reserve.

On November 30, 2015, he was waived.

=== Jacksonville Jaguars ===
Porter was signed to the Jacksonville Jaguars' practice squad on December 7, 2015.

On September 3, 2016, Porter was released by the Jaguars and was signed to the practice squad the next day. He was promoted to the active roster on December 6, 2016. He was promoted on injured reserve on December 27, 2016.

On May 1, 2017, Porter was released by the Jaguars.

=== San Francisco 49ers ===
On August 9, 2017, Porter was signed by the San Francisco 49ers. He was released on August 29, 2017.
