= 2011 All-Big 12 Conference football team =

The 2011 All-Big 12 Conference football team consists of American football players chosen as All-Big 12 Conference players for the 2011 Big 12 Conference football season. The conference recognizes two official All-Big 12 selectors: (1) the Big 12 conference coaches selected separate offensive and defensive units and named first- and second-team players (the "Coaches" team); and (2) a panel of sports writers and broadcasters covering the Big 12 also selected offensive and defensive units and named first- and second-team players (the "Media" team).

== Offensive selections ==
=== Quarterbacks ===
- Robert Griffin III, Baylor (Coaches-1; Media-1)
- Brandon Weeden, Oklahoma State (Coaches-2; Media-2)

=== Running backs ===
- Henry Josey, Missouri (Coaches-1; Media-1)
- Joseph Randle, Oklahoma State (Coaches-2; Media-1)
- Terrance Ganaway, Baylor (Coaches-1; Media-2)
- Cyrus Gray, Texas A&M (Coaches-2; Media-2)

=== Fullbacks ===
- Trey Millard, Oklahoma (Coaches-1)
- Kye Staley, Oklahoma State (Coaches-2)

=== Centers ===
- Grant Garner, Oklahoma State (Coaches-1; Media-1)
- Gabe Ikard, Oklahoma (Coaches-1, Media-1)
- Philip Blake, Baylor (Coaches-1; Media-2)

=== Guards ===
- Kelechi Osemele, Iowa State (Coaches-1; Media-1)
- Robert T. Griffin, Baylor (Coaches-2)
- Jeremiah Hatch, Kansas (Coaches-2)
- Hayworth Hicks, Iowa State (Coaches-2)
- Austin Wuebbels, Missouri (Media-2)

=== Tackles ===
- Levy Adcock, Oklahoma State (Coaches-1; Media-1)
- Luke Joeckel, Texas A&M (Coaches-2; Media-1)
- LaAdrian Waddle, Texas Tech (Coaches-2; Media-2)
- Clyde Aufner, Kansas State (Media-2)
- Zach Hanson, Kansas State (Coaches-2)
- David Snow, Texas (Media-2)

=== Tight ends ===
- Michael Egnew, Missouri (Coaches-1; Media-1)
- James Hanna, Oklahoma (Coaches-2; Media-2 (tie))
- Adam James, Texas Tech (Media-2 (tie))

=== Receivers ===
- Justin Blackmon, Oklahoma State (Coaches-1; Media-1)
- Kendall Wright, Baylor (Coaches-1; Media-1)
- Ryan Broyles, Oklahoma (Coaches-1; Media-2)
- Ryan Swope, Texas A&M (Coaches-2; Media-2)
- Josh Cooper, Oklahoma State (Coaches-2)
- Kenny Stills, Oklahoma (Coaches-2)

== Defensive selections ==
=== Defensive linemen ===
- Frank Alexander, Oklahoma (Coaches-1; Media-1)
- Jamie Blatnick, Oklahoma State (Coaches-1; Media-1)
- Alex Okafor, Texas (Coaches-1; Media-1)
- Ronnell Lewis, Oklahoma (Coaches-1; Media-2)
- Dominique Hamilton, Missouri (Media-1)
- Ray Kibble, Kansas State (Coaches-1)
- Jackson Jeffcoat, Texas (Coaches-2; Media-2)
- Kheeston Randall, Texas (Coaches-2; Media-2)
- Jacquies Smith, Missouri (Coaches-2; Media-2)
- Nicolas Jean-Baptiste, Baylor (Coaches-2)
- Tony Jerod-Eddie, Texas A&M (Coaches-2)

=== Linebackers ===
- Emmanuel Acho, Texas (Coaches-1; Media-1)
- Arthur Brown, Kansas State (Coaches-1; Media-1)
- Jake Knott, Iowa State (Coaches-2; Media-1)
- A. J. Klein, Iowa State (Coaches-1; Media-2)
- Travis Lewis, Oklahoma (Coaches-2; Media-2)
- Sean Porter, Texas A&M (Media-1)
- Steven Johnson, Kansas (Media-2)
- Luke Lambert, Missouri (Media-2)
- Keenan Robinson, Texas (Coaches-2)

=== Defensive backs ===
- Brodrick Brown, Oklahoma State (Coaches-1; Media-1)
- Jamell Fleming, Oklahoma (Coaches-1; Media-1)
- E. J. Gaines, Missouri (Media-1; Coaches-2)
- Nigel Malone, Kansas State (Coaches-1; Media-2)
- Markelle Martin, Oklahoma State (Coaches-1; Media-2)
- Carrington Byndom, Texas (Media-1)
- Kenny Vaccaro, Texas (Coaches-1)
- Leonard Johnson, Iowa State (Media-2; Coaches-2)
- Justin Gilbert, Oklahoma State (Media-2)
- Tysyn Hartman, Kansas State (Coaches-2)
- Demontre Hurst, Oklahoma (Coaches-2)
- Quandre Diggs, Texas (Coaches-2)

== Special teams ==
=== Kickers ===
- Randy Bullock, Texas A&M (Coaches-2; Media-1)
- Quinn Sharp, Oklahoma State (Coaches-1)
- Justin Tucker, Texas (Media-2)

=== Punters ===
- Quinn Sharp, Oklahoma State (Coaches-1; Media-1)
- Trey Barrow, Missouri (Coaches-2; Media-2)

=== All-purpose / Return specialists ===
- Collin Klein, Kansas State (Media-1)
- Fozzy Whittaker, Texas (Coaches-1)
- Tyler Lockett, Kansas State (Coaches-2; Media-2)

== Key ==
Bold = selected as a first-team player by both the coaches and media panel

Coaches = selected by Big 12 Conference coaches

Media = selected by a media panel

== See also ==
- 2011 College Football All-America Team
