= Carrington Byndom =

American football player (born 1992)

No. 37, 29, 43, 40, 33
- Position: Cornerback

Personal information
- Born: July 7, 1992 (age 34); Lufkin, Texas, U.S.
- Listed height: 6 ft 0 in (1.83 m)
- Listed weight: 180 lb (82 kg)

Career information
- High school: Lufkin
- College: Texas
- NFL draft: 2014: undrafted

Career history
- Carolina Panthers (2014–2015); San Diego Chargers (2015)*; Arizona Cardinals (2015-2016)*; San Diego Chargers (2016)*; Baltimore Ravens (2016)*
- * Offseason or practice squad member only

Awards and highlights
- First-team All-Big 12 (2011); 2011 Holiday Bowl Champion; 2012 Alamo Bowl Champion
- Stats at Pro Football Reference

Carrington Byndom (born July 7, 1992) is an American former professional football player who was a cornerback in the National Football League (NFL). He played college football for the Texas Longhorns. He was signed as an undrafted free agent in 2014 and then spent 3 seasons in the NFL, playing in 3 games for the Carolina Panthers and spending time on the practice squads of Carolina, San Diego, Arizona and Baltimore.

== Early life ==
Byndom played high school football at Lufkin High School where he made the Sporting News Class of 2010 All-Defense Team in 2009 and their list of Top 100 players later that summer. After the 2009 season, his senior year, he was 2nd Team All-State. He was recruited by several top schools including LSU, Oklahoma and Oklahoma State, but he committed to Texas.

== College career ==
Byndom was an All-Conference cornerback at the University of Texas at Austin from 2010 to 2013.

After playing a back-up role in 2010 - filling in for the injured Chykie Brown, Byndom became a starter in 2011, led the conference in interceptions for a touchdown with 1 and co-led the team in pass breakups with 15 (shared with Quandre Diggs). His 58 yard interception for a touchdown came in the 3rd Quarter in the final Texas A&M game before A&M left for the SEC and it sparked a 17 point comeback victory. His role in that win, and the season, helped the Longhorns to reach and win the 2011 Holiday Bowl and earned him AP 1st Team All-Big 12 honors that year.

In 2012, he had his 2nd interception return for a touchdown, making him only the 7th player in school history to get 2. He helped the team reach and win the 2012 Alamo Bowl and co-led the team in blocked kicks (1 punt and 1 Field goal) with Mykkele Thompson and Chris Whaley.

In 2013, he received Coaches 2nd Team All-Big 12 Honors and helped the team reach the 2013 Alamo Bowl where he received the Sportsmanship Award.

After the season was over, he participated in the 2014 East-West Shrine Bowl.

== Professional career ==
=== Carolina Panthers ===
On May 16, 2014, Byndom was signed as an undrafted free agent by the Carolina Panthersand then waived by them at the end of camp on August 30, 2014. On the next day, September 1, he was signed to the Panthers' practice squad. He was signed to the roster from the practice squad on December 2, 2014 to replace Antoine Cason for the last four games of the season. He appeared in 3 games and was inactive for 1. He played 51 snaps and recorded 1 tackle during that time.

At the end of training camp in 2015, he was released by the Panthers, signed to the practice squad two days later and released two days after that.

=== San Diego Chargers ===
A few weeks after being released by the Panthers, Byndom was signed to the Chargers practice squad and then released to the roster the next day.

=== Arizona Cardinals ===
The Arizona Cardinals signed Byndom to their practice squad on October 21, 2015, a few weeks after being released by the Chargers, and he stayed on their practice squad for the rest of the season. On January 26, 2016, Byndom signed a futures contract with the Cardinals.

Byndom was waived by the Cardinals during the 2016 camp on July 19.

=== San Diego Chargers (2nd Stint) ===
A few weeks after being cut by the Cardinals, on July 31, Byndom was signed by the Chargers again. He spent two weeks with them during camp and was waived and released again on August 16.

=== Baltimore Ravens ===
The day after being released by the Chargers, Byndom signed with the Ravens who was dealing with a series of injuries to defensive backs. On September 3, 2016, he was placed on injured reserve. During the final preseason game, he left the game with a hamstring injury and was waived as injured the next day. On September 8, 2016, he was released from the Ravens' injured reserve with an injury settlement.
