= Jamie Blatnick =

American football player (born 1989)

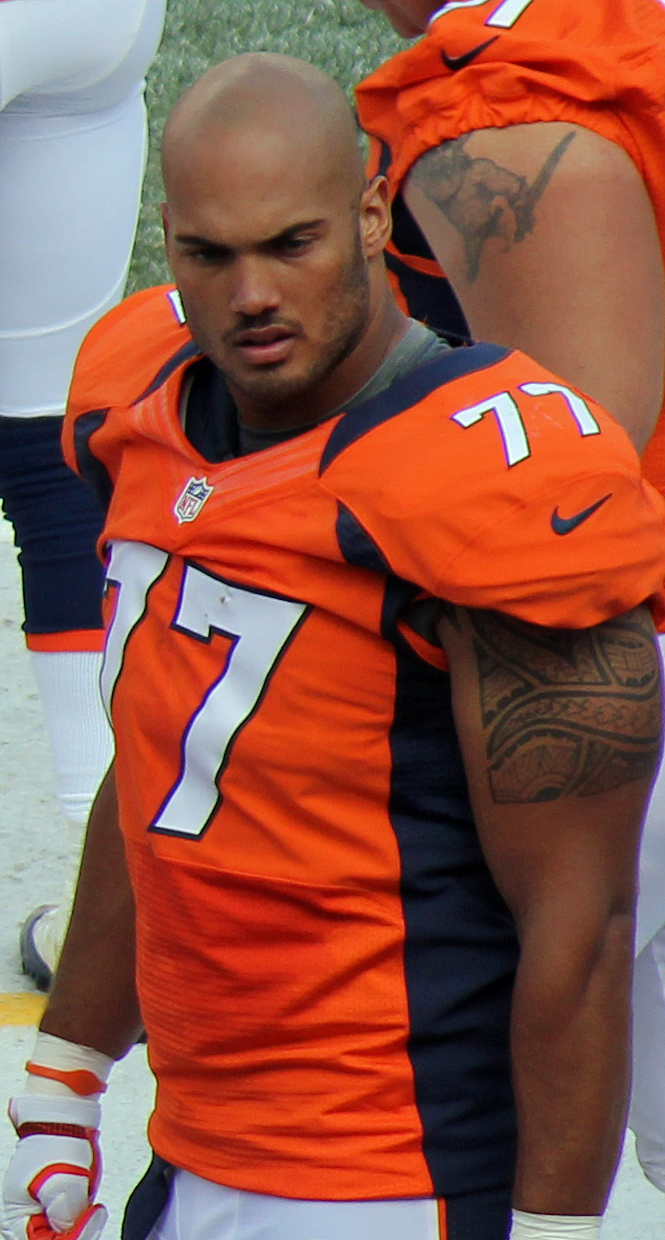
- Blatnick in the 2012 preseason

No. 77
- Position: Outside linebacker

Personal information
- Born: June 24, 1989 (age 37); Fontana, California, U.S.
- Listed height: 6 ft 3 in (1.91 m)
- Listed weight: 253 lb (115 kg)

Career information
- College: Oklahoma State
- NFL draft: 2012: undrafted

Career history
- Denver Broncos (2012); Buffalo Bills (2013); Los Angeles Kiss (2014)*
- * Offseason or practice squad member only

Awards and highlights
- First-team All-Big 12 (2011)

Jamie Blatnick (born June 24, 1989) is an American former football linebacker. He played college football at Oklahoma State.

== Professional career ==
=== Denver Broncos ===
Blatnick signed with the Denver Broncos as an undrafted free agent following the 2012 NFL draft.

=== Buffalo Bills ===
Blatnick signed with the Buffalo Bills during the 2013 offseason. He was released from the Bills on October 15, 2013.

=== Los Angeles Kiss ===
Blatnick was assigned to the Los Angeles Kiss of the Arena Football League on November 1, 2013. He was placed on recallable reassignment by the Kiss in January 2014.
