= Julien Obioha =

American football player (born 1994)

Profile
- Position: Defensive end

Personal information
- Born: July 7, 1994 (age 32); New Orleans, Louisiana
- Listed height: 6 ft 3 in (1.91 m)
- Listed weight: 280 lb (127 kg)

Career information
- High school: New Orleans (LA) Brother Martin
- College: Texas A&M
- NFL draft: 2016: undrafted

Career history
- New York Jets (2016)
- Stats at Pro Football Reference

Julien Obioha (born July 7, 1994) is an American football defensive end who is currently a free agent. He played college football at Texas A&M, and signed with the New York Jets as an undrafted free agent in 2016.

== Professional career ==
Obioha signed with the New York Jets on May 5, 2016, after going undrafted in the 2016 NFL draft. On August 9, 2016, Obioha was waived/injured by the Jets and was placed on injured reserve. On April 26, 2017, Obioha was waived by the Jets. On August 23, 2017, Obioha hurt his back in a workout with the Saints.
