= Arceto Clark =

American football player (born 1989)

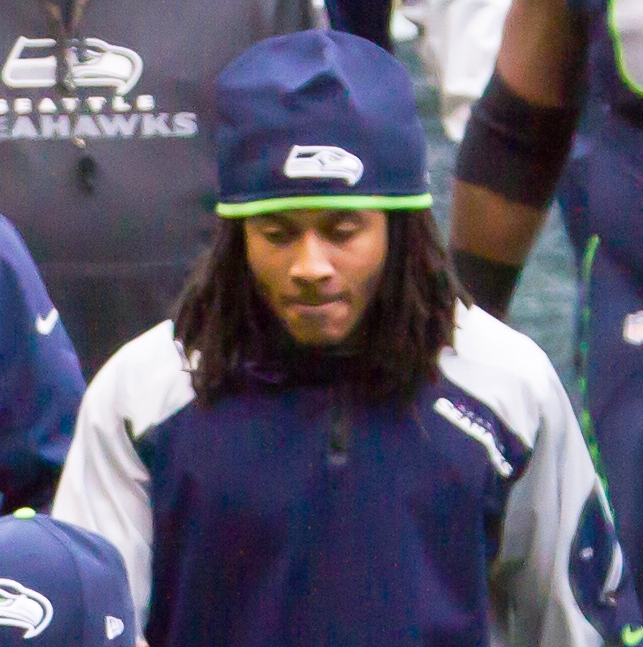
- Clark in 2013.

Profile
- Position: Wide receiver

Personal information
- Born: September 29, 1989 (age 37); Tupelo, Mississippi, U.S.
- Listed height: 5 ft 10 in (1.78 m)
- Listed weight: 180 lb (82 kg)

Career information
- High school: Shannon (MS)
- College: Mississippi State
- NFL draft: 2013: undrafted

Career history
- Seattle Seahawks (2013)*; Cleveland Browns (2013)*; Seattle Seahawks (2013–2014)*
- * Offseason or practice squad member only

Awards and highlights
- Super Bowl champion (XLVIII)
- Stats at Pro Football Reference

Arceto Martinez Clark (born September 29, 1989) is an American former football wide receiver. He played college football for the Mississippi State. He signed with the Seattle Seahawks as an undrafted free agent in 2013. With the Seahawks, he won Super Bowl XLVIII over the Denver Broncos.

== Early life ==
Clark was born in Tupelo, Mississippi. A graduate of Shannon High School in Shannon, Mississippi, Clark was selected to play in the Mississippi-Alabama High School All-Star game at the wide receiver position. He was ranked among the top 25 high school recruits in the state of Mississippi by The Clarion-Ledger following the conclusion of his senior season. He was selected as the Class 4A Division 4 Offensive Most Valuable Player in high school.

== Professional career ==
=== Seattle Seahawks ===
On June 4, 2013, Clark signed with the Seattle Seahawks as an undrafted free agent. On August 31, 2013, he was released by the Seahawks.

=== Cleveland Browns ===
On September 10, 2013, Clark signed with the Cleveland Browns.

=== Seattle Seahawks (second stint) ===
On October 2, 2013, Clark re-signed with the Seattle Seahawks to join the practice squad. He was part of the team that won Super Bowl XLVIII. He was released by the Seahawks on August 30, 2014.
