= Jeff Fuller (wide receiver) =

American football player (born 1990)

No. 83
- Position: Wide receiver

Personal information
- Born: April 20, 1990 (age 36); Stanford, California, U.S.
- Listed height: 6 ft 4 in (1.93 m)
- Listed weight: 218 lb (99 kg)

Career information
- High school: McKinney Boyd (McKinney, Texas)
- College: Texas A&M (2008–2011)
- NFL draft: 2012: undrafted

Career history
- Miami Dolphins (2012–2013)*; Calgary Stampeders (2013–2015); Seattle Seahawks (2016)*; Saskatchewan Roughriders (2016); Toronto Argonauts (2017–2018)
- * Offseason or practice squad member only

Awards and highlights
- Grey Cup champion (2014); First-team All-Big 12 (2010)
- Stats at Pro Football Reference
- Stats at CFL.ca

Jeffrey Alan Fuller Jr. (born April 20, 1990) is an American former professional football wide receiver in the Canadian Football League (CFL). He played college football for the Texas A&M Aggies. Fuller signed with the Miami Dolphins of the National Football League (NFL) as an undrafted free agent before played in the CFL for the Calgary Stampeders, Saskatchewan Roughriders and Toronto Argonauts.

== Early life ==
Fuller grew up playing basketball. He began playing football his freshman year of high school, and later earned a spot on the varsity team prior to his sophomore year. During his junior year, he caught 27 passes for 327 yards and three touchdowns. He recorded 37 receptions for 448 yards and five touchdowns as a senior. He received Second-team All-District 9-4A honors for both his junior and senior years.

During his college recruitment period, Fuller initially committed to play for the Oklahoma Sooners. He wanted to play for Texas A&M, partly because his father played there, but did not commit to the school since then-head coach Dennis Franchione ran the option offense. While Fuller was still committed to the Sooners, A&M replaced Franchione with Mike Sherman. Fuller received a call from Sherman the day he got hired. Sherman, who runs a pro-style offense that utilizes true receivers, convinced Fuller to commit to the Aggies. When asked about his change of commitment, Fuller stated: "I felt bad switching, because I had made a commitment to [the Sooners]. But I wanted to be somewhere where I knew I'd be happy for four years. I definitely feel I made the right decision." Once A&M signed all of its recruits, Fuller became the Aggies' highest-ranked commitment in its 2008 class per Rivals.com.

Fuller graduated from high school a semester early to take part in A&M's spring practices.

== College career ==
Fuller received All-Big 12 Honorable Mention honors in 2008 and 2009. He missed four games during the 2009 season due to a cracked fibula in his right leg.

During the 2010 season, Fuller and Ryan Swope broke Rod Bernstine’s 24 year-old school single-season receptions record with 72. That same season, he broke the Aggies' all-time record for touchdown catches. The record was previously held by Bob Long, who caught 19 touchdowns during his career from 1966–68. Fuller also became the second Aggie in school history to reach 2,000 receiving yards.

On November 1, 2010, Fuller stated that he is leaning toward returning for his senior season, instead of declaring for the 2011 NFL draft. He intends to graduate from A&M in the spring of 2012.

He received first-team All-Big 12 Honors for the 2010 season.

== Professional career ==
=== Miami Dolphins ===
Fuller was undrafted in the 2012 NFL draft. He signed with the Miami Dolphins as a rookie free agent. He was waived on August 27, 2013.

=== Calgary Stampeders ===
Fuller was added to the practice roster of the Calgary Stampeders on September 14, 2013 He played for the Stampeders for three years and was a member of the 102nd Grey Cup champions. He played in a total of 25 regular season games, recording 91 receptions for 1,251 yards and eight touchdowns.

=== Seattle Seahawks ===
Fuller signed with the Seattle Seahawks on February 11, 2016. He was released on May 10, 2016 with the waived/injured designation.

=== Saskatchewan Roughriders ===
On October 1, 2016, Fuller signed with the Saskatchewan Roughriders. Fuller only appeared in one game for the Roughriders in 2016, catching 2 passes for 34 yards. Following the season he was not re-signed by the Riders and became a free agent.

=== Toronto Argonauts ===
On February 16, 2017, Fuller signed with the Toronto Argonauts of the Canadian Football League as a free agent. Fuller played in nine games for the Argos in 2017, catching 24 passes for 287 yards. Fuller was released by the Argos the following offseason, on May 1, 2018, as the team trimmed its roster down to 75 players.

== Personal ==
He is the son of Jeffrey Avery Fuller, who played safety for the Texas A&M Aggies and the San Francisco 49ers.
