= Tramain Jacobs =

American football player (born 1992)

No. 39, 25, 26, 24, 46
- Position: Cornerback

Personal information
- Born: May 20, 1992 (age 34); Covington, Louisiana, U.S.
- Listed height: 5 ft 11 in (1.80 m)
- Listed weight: 191 lb (87 kg)

Career information
- High school: Covington
- College: Texas A&M
- NFL draft: 2014: undrafted

Career history
- Baltimore Ravens (2014); New York Giants (2015); Oakland Raiders (2016)*; Toronto Argonauts (2017)*; Detroit Lions (2017)*
- * Offseason or practice squad member only

Career NFL statistics
- Total tackles: 3
- Stats at Pro Football Reference

Tramain Jacobs (born May 20, 1992) is an American former professional football player who was a cornerback in the National Football League (NFL). He first enrolled at Mississippi Gulf Coast Community College before transferring to Texas A&M University. He attended Covington High School in Covington, Louisiana. He has been a member of the Baltimore Ravens, New York Giants, Oakland Raiders, Toronto Argonauts and Detroit Lions.

== Early life ==
Jacobs participated in football and track and field for the Covington High School Lions. He was named first-team Louisiana Class 5A All-State as a kick returner his senior year and was ranked as the No. 6 DB nationally by SuperPrep. He placed in the region triple jump meet in track.

== College career ==
Jacobs first played college football for the Mississippi Gulf Coast Bulldogs of Mississippi Gulf Coast Community College from 2010 to 2011. He recorded 34 tackles, 13 pass deflections and two interceptions in 2011. He also recovered two fumbles, returning one for a touchdown, and totaled 616 yards and one touchdown on 28 punt and kickoff returns.

Jacobs transferred to play for the Texas A&M Aggies from 2012 to 2013. He played in 26 games for the Aggies, totaling 55 tackles, 13 pass deflections and two interceptions.

== Professional career ==
Pre-draft measurables
Height	Weight	40-yard dash	10-yard split	20-yard split	20-yard shuttle	Three-cone drill	Vertical jump	Broad jump	Bench press
5 ft 11 in (1.80 m)	182 lb (83 kg)	4.50 s	1.57 s	2.56 s	4.31 s	7.07 s	32 1/2 in (0.83 m)	9 ft 6 in (2.90 m)	7 reps
All values from Texas A&M Pro Day

Jacobs was signed by the Baltimore Ravens on May 12, 2014, after going undrafted in the 2014 NFL draft. He made his NFL debut on November 9, 2014, against the Tennessee Titans. He was released by the Ravens on August 31, 2015.

Jacobs was signed to the New York Giants' practice squad on September 15, 2015. On November 7, 2015, he was elevated to the active roster. He was waived by the Giants on November 16 and re-signed to the team's practice squad on November 23, 2015. He was promoted to the active roster on December 8, 2015. He was released by the Giants on August 4, 2016.

Jacobs signed with the Oakland Raiders on August 5, 2016. On August 29, 2016, he was released by the Raiders.

Jacobs signed with the Toronto Argonauts on March 14, 2017. He was released by the Argonauts on June 18, 2017.

On August 8, 2017, Jacobs signed with the Detroit Lions. He was waived/injured on September 1, 2017, and placed on injured reserve. He was released on September 5, 2017.
