= Deshazor Everett =

American football player (born 1992)

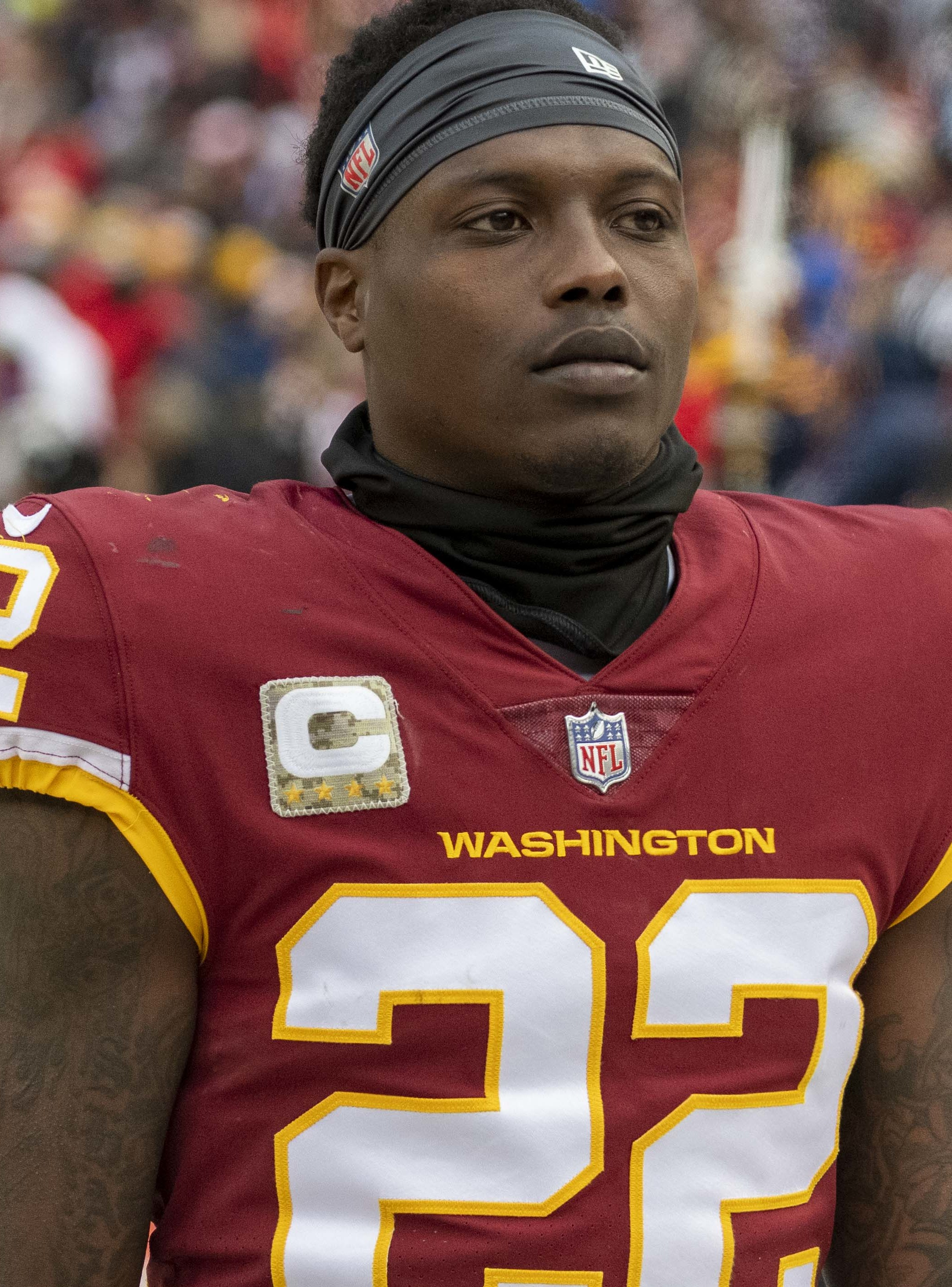
- Everett with the Washington Football Team in 2021

No. 22
- Position: Safety

Personal information
- Born: February 22, 1992 (age 34); DeRidder, Louisiana, U.S.
- Listed height: 6 ft 0 in (1.83 m)
- Listed weight: 203 lb (92 kg)

Career information
- High school: DeRidder
- College: Texas A&M
- NFL draft: 2015: undrafted

Career history
- Tampa Bay Buccaneers (2015)*; Washington Redskins / Football Team (2015–2021)
- * Offseason or practice squad member only

Career NFL statistics
- Total tackles: 170
- Forced fumbles: 2
- Pass deflections: 11
- Interceptions: 2
- Stats at Pro Football Reference

Deshazor Duntee' Everett (born February 22, 1992) is an American former professional football player who was a safety and special teamer in the National Football League (NFL). He played college football for the Texas A&M Aggies. He signed as an undrafted free agent with the Tampa Bay Buccaneers in 2015 before joining the Washington Redskins that same year. Everett was released by Washington in 2021 after a car crash led to the death of his girlfriend. He was originally charged with involuntary manslaughter before the charge was reduced to reckless driving, to which he pleaded guilty.

== College career ==
A 3-star safety recruit, Everett committed to play college football for the Texas A&M Aggies over offers from Arkansas, Kansas, Louisiana Tech, Memphis, Missouri, Ole Miss, and Southern Methodist.

As a true freshman in 2011, Everett mainly played on special teams, recording 10 tackles. As a sophomore, he played in 13 games, starting 12 of them, playing both cornerback and safety. He recorded 56 tackles, nine pass breakups, and two interceptions (returning one for a touchdown). Against Alabama, Everett recorded a game-clinching interception of Alabama quarterback AJ McCarron, leading to a 29–24 upset victory over number-one-ranked Alabama.

In 2013, during his junior season, Everett played in 13 games at cornerback and safety, starting nine, and recorded 73 tackles, two interceptions, nine pass breakups, one fumble recovery, and two defensive touchdowns. As a senior in 2014, he started all 13 games at cornerback, recording 79 tackles, along with six pass breakups and one interception. Everett finished his four-year college career playing in 50 games with 34 starts, recording 218 tackles, 26 pass breakups, five interceptions, one fumble recovery, and three defensive touchdowns. He also returned a blocked field goal for a touchdown as a senior.

== Professional career ==
Pre-draft measurables
Height	Weight	Arm length	Hand span	40-yard dash	10-yard split	20-yard split	20-yard shuttle	Three-cone drill	Vertical jump	Broad jump	Bench press
5 ft 10 7/8 in (1.80 m)	188 lb (85 kg)	31 in (0.79 m)	9 in (0.23 m)	4.56 s	1.59 s	2.62 s	4.27 s	6.78 s	38.0 in (0.97 m)	10 ft 10 in (3.30 m)	15 reps
All values from Texas A&M Pro Day

=== Tampa Bay Buccaneers ===
On May 5, 2015, the Tampa Bay Buccaneers signed Everett to a three-year, US$1.48 million contract.

Throughout organized team activities with the Buccaneers, he competed for a roster spot as a backup cornerback against Mike Jenkins, Isaiah Frey, Sterling Moore, C. J. Wilson, and Leonard Johnson. On July 29, 2015, the Buccaneers waived Everett.

=== Washington Redskins / Football Team ===
==== 2015 ====
Everett signed with the Washington Redskins on August 1, 2015. On September 7, 2015, Everett was waived but re-joined the team's practice squad the following day. On October 3, 2015, the Redskins promoted Everett to the active roster.

He made his debut in the team's 23–20 victory against the Philadelphia Eagles in Week 4. On October 18, 2015, Everett recorded his first career tackle on linebacker Trevor Riley while covering a kickoff in the second quarter of the Redskins' 34–20 loss at the New York Jets. In Week 10, he collected a season-high five combined tackles during a 47–14 victory against the New Orleans Saints. The following week, Everett made one tackle before leaving the Redskins' 44–16 loss at the Carolina Panthers in the second quarter due to a hamstring injury. The injury sidelined him for the next two games (Week 13–14). Everett finished his rookie season in 2015 with 16 combined tackles (12 solo) in 11 games and zero starts.

On January 10, 2016, Everett appeared in his first career playoff game and recorded a solo tackle during their 35–18 loss to the Green Bay Packers in the NFC Wildcard Game.

==== 2016 ====
During training camp, Everett opted to switch to safety. Head coach Jay Gruden named Everett the third free safety on the depth chart, behind DeAngelo Hall and Will Blackmon.

He was promoted to backup free safety after Hall tore his ACL in his right knee and starting strong safety David Bruton was placed on injured reserve in Week 4. On December 11, 2016, Everett recorded a tackle and made his first career interception off a pass by Carson Wentz during a 27–22 victory at the Eagles in Week 14. On December 15, 2016, the NFL fined him $48,000 for two penalties during special teams plays in the fourth quarter of their victory against the Eagles. His first $24,000 fine was for hitting a defenseless player penalty he committed on Eagles' running back Darren Sproles during a punt return. His second $24,000 fine was for an illegal blindside block on tight end Brent Celek during a Redskins' punt return. In Week 15, Everett collected two solo tackles in the Redskins' 26–15 loss to the Panthers. He finished his first season as a safety with 11 solo tackles, a pass deflection, and an interception in 16 games and zero starts.

==== 2017 ====
Throughout training camp, Everett competed for a spot as a backup safety against Blackmon, Earl Wolff, Josh Evans, Montae Nicholson, Stefan McClure, and Fish Smithson. Defensive coordinator Greg Manusky named Everett the starting strong safety, alongside free safety D. J. Swearinger, after Su'a Cravens announced his decision to retire a week before their season-opener.

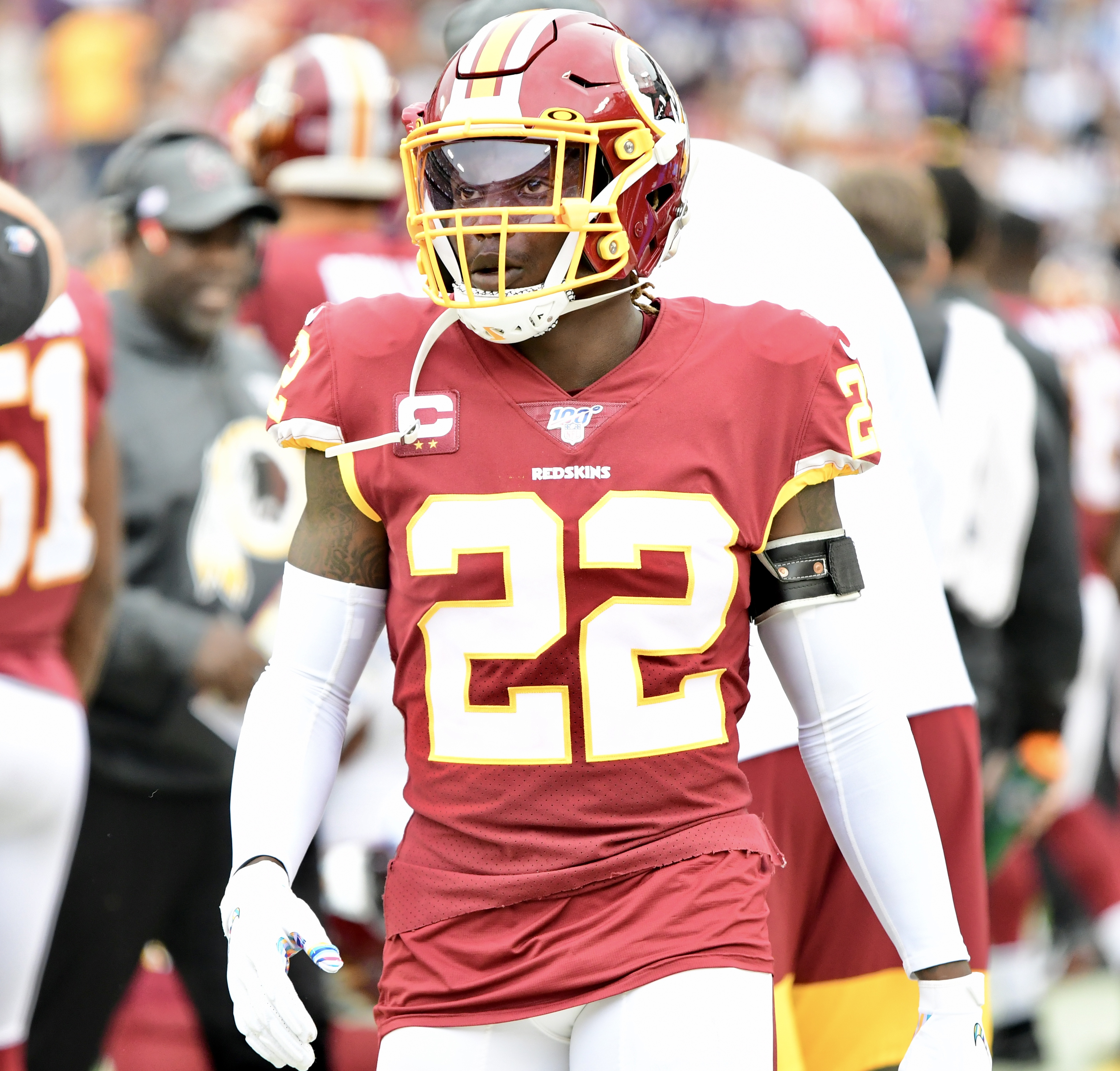
Everett with the Redskins in 2019

He made his first career start in the Redskins season-opener against the Eagles and recorded seven combined tackles in their 30–17 loss. After Week 3, rookie Montae Nicholson started in place of Everett after he sustained a sprained MCL. Nicholson remained the starting strong safety after performing well in Everett's absence. Everett entered the game for base packages while Nicholson was used for nickel packages. In Week 4, Everett recorded four solo tackles before leaving the Redskins' 29–20 loss at the Kansas City Chiefs in the third quarter after sustaining a hamstring injury. He was sidelined for the next two weeks due to the injury (Weeks 6–7). On November 23, 2017, Everett earned the start at strong safety after Nicholson sustained a concussion during their 34–31 loss at the Saints the previous week. He finished the Redskins' 20–10 victory against the New York Giants with seven combined tackles. He remained the starting strong safety for the remaining six games of the regular season. On December 10, 2017, Everett recorded a season-high 11 combined tackles (six solo) and deflected a pass during a 30–13 loss at the Los Angeles Chargers in Week 14. In Week 17, he collected a season-high seven solo tackles, three assisted tackles, and a pass deflection in the Redskins' 18–10 loss at the Giants. He finished the 2017 season with 62 combined tackles (41 solo) and five pass deflections in 14 games and eight starts.

==== 2018–2021 ====
On March 6, 2018, the Redskins signed Everett to a two-year, $2.60 million contract that includes a $250,000 signing bonus.

On November 3, 2019, Everett signed a three-year contract extension with the Redskins through the 2022 season. He was placed on injured reserve on December 7. Before the Week 6 2020 game against the Giants, it was announced that Everett would be taking over as the starting free safety over Troy Apke. On December 17, 2020, Everett was placed on injured reserve due to a torn pectoral.

On December 24, 2021, Everett was placed on the team's reserve/non-football injury list after being admitted to a hospital for injuries from a car crash that killed his girlfriend, who was in the passenger seat. Everett was released from the team on March 16, 2022.

== NFL career statistics ==
Legend
**Bold**	Career high

=== Regular season ===
Year	Team	Games		Tackles					Interceptions					Fumbles			
Year	Team	GP	GS	Cmb	Solo	Ast	Sck	TFL	Int	Yds	TD	Lng	PD	FF	FR	Yds	TD
2015	WAS	11	0	16	12	4	0.0	0	0	0	0	0	0	0	0	0	0
2016	WAS	**16**	0	12	12	0	0.0	0	**1**	0	0	0	1	0	0	0	0
2017	WAS	14	**8**	**62**	**41**	**21**	0.0	0	0	0	0	0	**5**	**1**	0	0	0
2018	WAS	**16**	3	26	17	9	0.0	**2**	**1**	**24**	0	**24**	1	0	0	0	0
2019	WAS	7	0	13	9	4	0.0	0	0	0	0	0	0	0	0	0	0
2020	WAS	11	6	31	23	8	0.0	0	0	0	0	0	4	**1**	0	0	0
2021	WAS	14	0	10	5	5	0.0	0	0	0	0	0	0	0	0	0	0
Total		89	17	170	119	51	0.0	2	2	24	0	24	11	2	0	0	0

=== Playoffs ===
Year	Team	Games		Tackles					Interceptions					Fumbles			
Year	Team	GP	GS	Cmb	Solo	Ast	Sck	TFL	Int	Yds	TD	Lng	PD	FF	FR	Yds	TD
2015	WAS	**1**	0	**1**	**1**	0	0.0	0	0	0	0	0	0	0	0	0	0
Total		1	0	1	1	0	0.0	0	0	0	0	0	0	0	0	0	0

== 2021 car crash ==
On December 23, 2021, Everett suffered serious but non-life-threatening injuries in a car crash that killed his girlfriend, 29-year-old Olivia Peters, who was a passenger in the car. On February 8, 2022, Everett turned himself in after he was served with a warrant for involuntary manslaughter. Everett was released on bond shortly after voluntarily appearing at the Loudoun County Magistrate's office. On July 19, 2022, Everett pleaded guilty in exchange for a reduced charge for misdemeanor reckless driving and was sentenced to three months house arrest.
