= Jonathan Stewart (linebacker) =

American football player (born 1990)

Profile
- Position: Linebacker

Personal information
- Born: November 23, 1990 (age 35); Shreveport, Louisiana, U.S.
- Listed height: 6 ft 3 in (1.91 m)
- Listed weight: 254 lb (115 kg)

Career information
- High school: Shreveport (LA) Byrd
- College: Texas A&M
- NFL draft: 2013: undrafted

Career history
- St. Louis Rams (2013); Tampa Bay Buccaneers (2013); Cleveland Browns (2013)*; Dallas Cowboys (2013)*
- * Offseason or practice squad member only
- Stats at Pro Football Reference

Jonathan Stewart (born November 23, 1990) is an American former football linebacker. He played college football at Texas A&M.

== Early life ==
Stewart attended C. E. Byrd High School in Shreveport, Louisiana. In his senior year, the Byrd Yellow Jackets went 9–3 on the season, losing 20–7 to Ouachita Parish.

== Professional career ==
=== 2013 NFL draft ===
Pre-draft measurables
Height	Weight	40-yard dash	10-yard split	20-yard split	20-yard shuttle	Three-cone drill	Vertical jump	Broad jump	Bench press
6 ft 4 in (1.93 m)	232 lb (105 kg)	4.55 s	1.59 s	2.64 s	4.53 s	7.44 s	31 in (0.79 m)	9 ft 10 in (3.00 m)	19 reps
All values from NFL Scouting Combine

The St. Louis Rams signed him as an undrafted free agent. On December 4, 2013, Stewart signed with the Cleveland Browns practice squad. On December 10, Stewart was released by the Browns.
