= Ryan Swope =

American football player (born 1990)

No. 19
- Position: Wide receiver

Personal information
- Born: September 20, 1990 (age 36); Austin, Texas, U.S.
- Listed height: 6 ft 0 in (1.83 m)
- Listed weight: 205 lb (93 kg)

Career information
- High school: Westlake (Austin)
- College: Texas A&M
- NFL draft: 2013: 6th round, 174th overall pick

Career history
- Arizona Cardinals (2013)*
- * Offseason or practice squad member only

Awards and highlights
- Second-team All-SEC (2012); Second-team All-Big 12 (2011)
- Stats at Pro Football Reference

Ryan Swope (born September 20, 1990) is an American former football wide receiver. He was selected by the Arizona Cardinals in the 2013 NFL draft.

== College career ==
As a sophomore at Texas A&M in 2010, Swope and Jeff Fuller both broke Rod Bernstine's 24-year-old school single-season receptions record with 72. As a junior the following season, Swope broke his own record for receptions and set the record for single-season receiving yards with 89 catches for 1,207 yards. He also had 11 receiving touchdowns that year, which at the time was the second highest single-season total on school history. As a senior in 2012, he set the school record for career receptions with 252. Although his single-season yardage record has since been broken by Mike Evans, his season and career reception records both still stand.

Swope was also a sprinter, with a personal best of 10.70 seconds in the 100 meters.

== Professional career ==
Pre-draft measurables
Height	Weight	Arm length	Hand span	40-yard dash	10-yard split	20-yard split	20-yard shuttle	Three-cone drill	Vertical jump	Broad jump	Bench press
6 ft 0 1/8 in (1.83 m)	205 lb (93 kg)	31 3/8 in (0.80 m)	8 1/2 in (0.22 m)	4.34 s	1.50 s	2.53 s	4.25 s	6.76 s	37 in (0.94 m)	10 ft 5 in (3.18 m)	16 reps
All values from NFL Combine;

Swope was selected in the sixth round of the 2013 NFL draft by the Arizona Cardinals.

On July 25, 2013, the Cardinals announced that Swope was placed on the reserve/retired list due to ongoing concussion issues.
