= Texas A&M Aggies football statistical leaders =

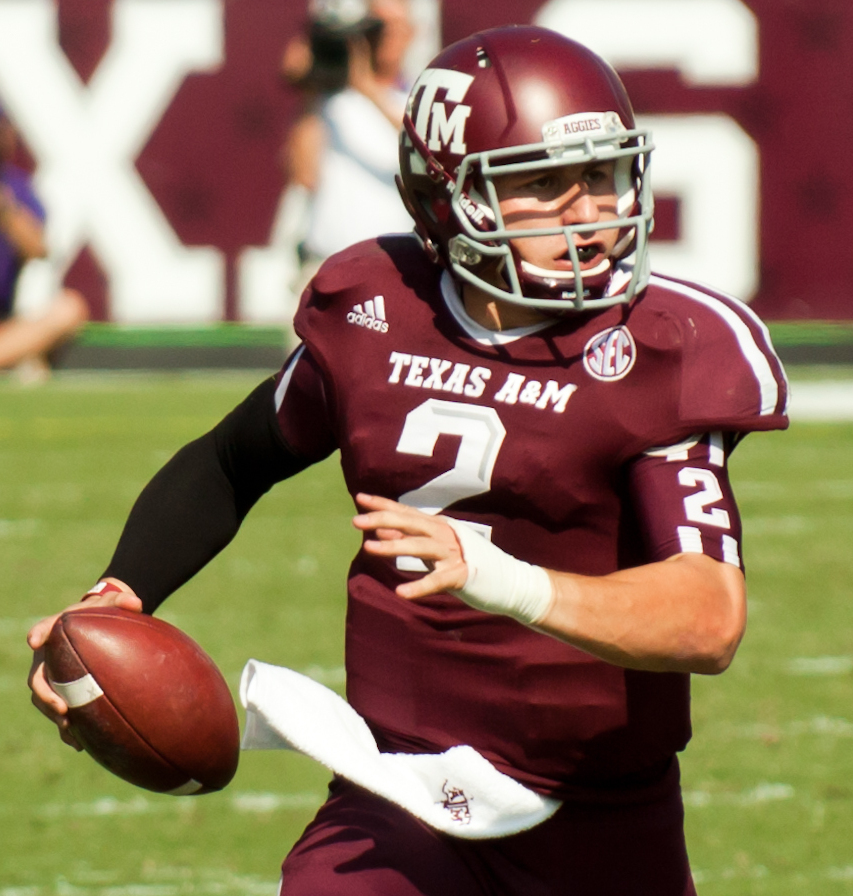
Johnny Manziel holds single-season school records in passing yards and touchdowns, and is third on both career lists, despite only playing for 2 seasons.

The Texas A&M Aggies football statistical leaders are individual statistical leaders of the Texas A&M Aggies football program in various categories, including passing, rushing, receiving, total offense, defensive stats, and kicking. Within those areas, the lists identify single-game, Single season and career leaders. The Aggies represent Texas A&M University in the NCAA's Southeastern Conference.

Although Texas A&M began competing in intercollegiate football in 1894, the school's official record book considers the "modern era" to have begun in 1950. Records from before this year are often incomplete and inconsistent, and they are generally not included in these lists.

These lists are dominated by more recent players for several reasons:

- Since 1950, seasons have increased from 10 games to 11 and then 12 games in length.
- The NCAA didn't allow freshmen to play varsity football until 1972 (with the exception of the World War II years), allowing players to have four-year careers.
- Bowl games only began counting toward single-season and career statistics in 2002. The Aggies have played in 15 bowl games since then.
- The Aggies have topped 6,000 yards 12 times in school history, including each season from 2009 through 2016.

These lists are updated through Week 11 of the 2026 season. Active players are listed in bold.

== Passing ==
=== Passing yards ===
Career
Rank	Player	Yards	Years
1	Kellen Mond	9,661	2017 2018 2019 2020
2	Jerrod Johnson	8,011	2007 2008 2009 2010
3	Johnny Manziel	7,820	2012 2013
4	**Marcel Reed**	7,119	2023 2024 2025 2026
5	Reggie McNeal	6,992	2002 2003 2004 2005
6	Corey Pullig	6,846	1992 1993 1994 1995
7	Kevin Murray	6,506	1983 1984 1985 1986
8	Stephen McGee	5,475	2005 2006 2007 2008
9	Ryan Tannehill	5,450	2008 2009 2010 2011
10	Edd Hargett	5,379	1966 1967 1968

Single season
Rank	Player	Yards	Year
1	Johnny Manziel	4,114	2013
2	Ryan Tannehill	3,744	2011
3	Johnny Manziel	3,706	2012
4	Jerrod Johnson	3,579	2009
5	Marcel Reed	3,169	2025
6	Kellen Mond	3,107	2018
7	Kellen Mond	2,897	2019
8	Reggie McNeal	2,791	2004
9	Kenny Hill	2,649	2014
10	Mark Farris	2,551	2000

Single game
Rank	Player	Yards	Year	Opponent
1	Kenny Hill	511	2014	South Carolina
2	Nick Starkel	499	2017	Wake Forest (Belk Bowl)
3	Johnny Manziel	464	2013	Alabama
4	Johnny Manziel	454	2013	Auburn
5	Johnny Manziel	453	2012	Arkansas
6	Ryan Tannehill	449	2010	Texas Tech
7	Johnny Manziel	446	2013	Mississippi State
8	Marcel Reed	439	2025	South Carolina
9	Kellen Mond	430	2018	Clemson
10	Johnny Manziel	426	2013	Sam Houston State

=== Passing touchdowns ===
Career
Rank	Player	TDs	Years
1	Kellen Mond	71	2017 2018 2019 2020
2	Jerrod Johnson	67	2007 2008 2009 2010
3	Johnny Manziel	63	2012 2013
4	**Marcel Reed**	49	2023 2024 2025 2026
5	Kevin Murray	48	1983 1984 1985 1986
6	Corey Pullig	47	1992 1993 1994 1995
7	Reggie McNeal	44	2002 2003 2004 2005
8	Ryan Tannehill	42	2008 2009 2010 2011
9	Edd Hargett	40	1966 1967 1968
10	Kyle Allen	33	2014 2015

Single season
Rank	Player	TDs	Year
1	Johnny Manziel	37	2013
2	Jerrod Johnson	30	2009
3	Ryan Tannehill	29	2011
4	Johnny Manziel	26	2012
5	Marcel Reed	25	2025
6	Kellen Mond	24	2018
7	Kenny Hill	23	2014
8	Jerrod Johnson	21	2008
9	Kellen Mond	20	2019
10	Dustin Long	19	2002
	Kellen Mond	19	2020
	Gary Kubiak	19	1982
	Trevor Knight	19	2016

Single game
Rank	Player	TDs	Year	Opponent
1	Dustin Long	7	2002	Texas Tech
2	Kellen Mond	6	2018	LSU
	Gary Kubiak	6	1981	Rice
	Ryan Tannehill	6	2011	Baylor
5	Gary Kubiak	5	1982	Rice
	Reggie McNeal	5	2005	SMU
	Jerrod Johnson	5	2010	Oklahoma State
	Johnny Manziel	5	2013	Alabama
	Johnny Manziel	5	2013	Mississippi State
	Conner Weigman	5	2023	New Mexico

== Rushing ==
=== Rushing yards ===
Career
Rank	Player	Yards	Years
1	Darren Lewis	5,012	1987 1988 1989 1990
2	Curtis Dickey	3,703	1976 1977 1978 1979
3	Trayveon Williams	3,379	2016 2017 2018
4	Cyrus Gray	3,298	2008 2009 2010 2011
5	Greg Hill	3,262	1991 1992 1993
6	Rodney Thomas	3,014	1991 1992 1993 1994
7	Isaiah Spiller	2,993	2019 2020 2021
8	George Woodard	2,911	1976 1977 1978 1979
9	Bubba Bean	2,846	1972 1973 1974 1975
10	Dante Hall	2,818	1996 1997 1998 1999

Single season
Rank	Player	Yards	Year
1	Trayveon Williams	1,760	2018
2	Darren Lewis	1,692	1988
3	Darren Lewis	1,691	1990
4	Johnny Manziel	1,410	2012
5	Greg Hill	1,339	1992
6	Bob Smith	1,302	1950
7	Greg Hill	1,216	1991
8	Tra Carson	1,165	2015
9	George Woodard	1,153	1976
10	Curtis Dickey	1,146	1978

Single game
Rank	Player	Yards	Year	Opponent
1	Bob Smith	297	1950	SMU
2	Trayveon Williams	240	2018	Northwestern State
3	Trayveon Williams	236	2018	North Carolina State (Gator Bowl)
4	Darren Lewis	232	1990	Texas Tech
5	Christine Michael	230	2011	Arkansas
	Curtis Dickey	230	1978	TCU
7	Johnny Manziel	229	2012	Oklahoma (Cotton Bowl)
	Leeland McElroy	229	1995	LSU
9	Trayveon Williams	228	2018	Ole Miss
10	Cyrus Gray	223	2010	Texas Tech

=== Rushing touchdowns ===
Career
Rank	Player	TDs	Years
1	Jorvorskie Lane	49	2005 2006 2007 2008
2	Darren Lewis	44	1987 1988 1989 1990
3	Rodney Thomas	41	1991 1992 1993 1994
4	George Woodard	35	1976 1977 1978 1979
5	Curtis Dickey	34	1976 1977 1978 1979
	Christine Michael	34	2009 2010 2011 2012
	Trayveon Williams	34	2016 2017 2018
8	Greg Hill	33	1991 1992 1993
9	Courtney Lewis	30	2003 2004 2005 2006
	Cyrus Gray	30	2008 2009 2010 2011
	Johnny Manziel	30	2012 2013

Single season
Rank	Player	TDs	Year
1	Johnny Manziel	21	2012
2	Joel Hunt	19	1927
	Jorvorskie Lane	19	2006
4	Darren Lewis	18	1990
	Trayveon Williams	18	2018
6	George Woodard	17	1976
	D’Andre Hardeman	17	1996
8	Jorvorskie Lane	16	2007
9	Greg Hill	15	1992
10	Vernon Wilton "Jelly" Woodman	14	1926
	Bob Smith	14	1950

Single game
Rank	Player	TDs	Year	Opponent
1	Vernon Wilton "Jelly" Woodman	7	1926	New Mexico

== Receiving ==
=== Receptions ===
Career
Rank	Player	Rec	Years
1	Ryan Swope	252	2009 2010 2011 2012
2	Christian Kirk	234	2015 2016 2017
3	Jeff Fuller	233	2008 2009 2010 2011
4	Ainias Smith	180	2019 2020 2021 2022 2023
5	Terrence Murphy	172	2001 2002 2003 2004
6	Josh Reynolds	164	2014 2015 2016
7	Uzoma Nwachukwu	152	2009 2010 2011 2012
8	Mike Evans	151	2012 2013
9	Malcome Kennedy	150	2011 2012 2013 2014
10	Jhamon Ausbon	147	2017 2018 2019

Single season
Rank	Player	Rec	Year
1	Ryan Swope	89	2011
2	Christian Kirk	83	2016
3	Mike Evans	82	2012
4	Christian Kirk	80	2015
5	Ryan Swope	72	2010
	Jeff Fuller	72	2010
	Ryan Swope	72	2012
8	Christian Kirk	71	2017
9	Jeff Fuller	70	2011
10	Mike Evans	69	2013

Single game
Rank	Player	Rec	Year	Opponent
1	Albert Connell	18	1996	Colorado
2	Malcome Kennedy	14	2014	South Carolina
3	Ken McLean	13	1965	Texas
	Barney Harris	13	1968	SMU
	Ryan Swope	13	2010	Stephen F. Austin
	Christian Kirk	13	2017	Wake Forest (Belk Bowl)
7	Keith Woodside	12	1986	Arkansas
	Ryan Tannehill	12	2008	Kansas State
	Christian Kirk	12	2016	South Carolina
	Josh Reynolds	12	2016	Kansas State (Texas Bowl)

=== Receiving yards ===
Career
Rank	Player	Yards	Years
1	Ryan Swope	3,117	2009 2010 2011 2012
2	Jeff Fuller	3,092	2008 2009 2010 2011
3	Christian Kirk	2,856	2015 2016 2017
4	Josh Reynolds	2,788	2014 2015 2016
5	Terrence Murphy	2,600	2001 2002 2003 2004
6	Mike Evans	2,499	2012 2013
7	Ainias Smith	2,407	2019 2020 2021 2022 2023
8	Uzoma Nwachukwu	2,239	2009 2010 2011 2012
9	Jhamon Ausbon	1,818	2017 2018 2019
10	Bethel Johnson	1,740	1999 2000 2001 2002

Single season
Rank	Player	Yards	Year
1	Mike Evans	1,394	2013
2	Ryan Swope	1,207	2011
3	Mike Evans	1,105	2012
4	Jeff Fuller	1,066	2010
5	Josh Reynolds	1,057	2016
6	Christian Kirk	1,009	2015
7	Christian Kirk	928	2016
8	Christian Kirk	919	2017
	KC Concepcion	919	2025
10	Mario Craver	917	2025

Single game
Rank	Player	Yards	Year	Opponent
1	Mike Evans	287	2013	Auburn
2	Mike Evans	279	2013	Alabama
3	Ken McLean	250	1965	Texas
4	Jason Carter	219	2005	Texas State
5	Ryan Tannehill	210	2008	Kansas State
6	Albert Connell	208	1996	Colorado
7	Mario Craver	207	2025	Notre Dame
8	Ryan Swope	206	2011	Baylor
9	Christian Kirk	189	2017	Wake Forest (Belk Bowl)
10	Hugh McElroy	180	1970	LSU

=== Receiving touchdowns ===
Career
Rank	Player	TDs	Years
1	Jeff Fuller	34	2008 2009 2010 2011
2	Josh Reynolds	30	2014 2015 2016
3	Christian Kirk	26	2015 2016 2017
4	Ryan Swope	24	2009 2010 2011 2012
5	Bob Long	19	1966 1967 1968
	Uzoma Nwachukwu	19	2009 2010 2011 2012
	Ainias Smith	19	2019 2020 2021 2022 2023
8	Mike Evans	17	2012 2013
9	Jalen Wydermyer	16	2019 2020 2021
10	Malcome Kennedy	15	2011 2012 2013 2014
	Noah Thomas	15	2022 2023 2024

Single season
Rank	Player	TDs	Year
1	Josh Reynolds	13	2014
2	Jeff Fuller	12	2010
	Mike Evans	12	2013
	Josh Reynolds	12	2016
5	Ryan Swope	11	2011
6	Christian Kirk	10	2017
	Jace Sternberger	10	2018
8	Jeff Fuller	9	2008
	Christian Kirk	9	2016
	KC Concepcion	9	2025

Single game
Rank	Player	TDs	Year	Opponent
1	Ryan Swope	4	2011	Baylor
	Mike Evans	4	2013	Auburn
3	Don Ellis	3	1952	Arkansas
	Don Jones	3	1982	Rice
	Chris Cole	3	1998	North Texas
	Uzoma Nwachukwu	3	2009	Utah State
	Jeff Fuller	3	2009	Texas
	Malcome Kennedy	3	2013	Alabama
	Travis Labhart	3	2013	Duke (Chick-fil-A Bowl)
	Christian Kirk	3	2017	Wake Forest (Belk Bowl)
	Noah Thomas	3	2023	New Mexico

== Total offense ==
Total offense is the sum of passing and rushing statistics. It does not include receiving or returns.

=== Total offense yards ===
Career
Rank	Player	Yards	Years
1	Kellen Mond	11,269	2017 2018 2019 2020
2	Johnny Manziel	9,989	2012 2013
3	Jerrod Johnson	8,888	2007 2008 2009 2010
4	Reggie McNeal	8,876	2002 2003 2004 2005
5	**Marcel Reed**	8,410	2023 2024 2025 2026
6	Stephen McGee	7,225	2005 2006 2007 2008
7	Corey Pullig	6,888	1992 1993 1994 1995
8	Kevin Murray	6,455	1983 1984 1985 1986
9	Ryan Tannehill	5,819	2008 2009 2010 2011
10	Edd Hargett	5,411	1966 1967 1968

Single season
Rank	Player	Yards	Year
1	Johnny Manziel	5,116	2012
2	Johnny Manziel	4,873	2013
3	Jerrod Johnson	4,085	2009
4	Ryan Tannehill	4,050	2011
5	Marcel Reed	3,662	2025
6	Kellen Mond	3,581	2018
7	Reggie McNeal	3,509	2004
8	Kellen Mond	3,398	2019
9	Stephen McGee	3,210	2007
10	Trevor Knight	3,046	2016

Single game
Rank	Player	Yards	Year	Opponent
1	Johnny Manziel	576	2012	Louisiana Tech
2	Johnny Manziel	562	2013	Alabama
3	Johnny Manziel	557	2012	Arkansas
4	Johnny Manziel	516	2012	Oklahoma (Cotton Bowl)
	Kenny Hill	516	2014	South Carolina
6	Johnny Manziel	502	2013	Auburn
7	Johnny Manziel	493	2013	Mississippi State
8	Jerrod Johnson	487	2008	Kansas State
9	Nick Starkel	480	2017	Wake Forest (Belk Bowl)
10	Kellen Mond	463	2018	Clemson

=== Total touchdowns ===
Career
Rank	Player	TDs	Years
1	Johnny Manziel	93	2012 2013
	Kellen Mond	93	2017 2018 2019 2020
3	Jerrod Johnson	83	2007 2008 2009 2010
4	**Marcel Reed**	66	2023 2024 2025 2026
5	Reggie McNeal	59	2002 2003 2004 2005
6	Kevin Murray	53	1983 1984 1985 1986
7	Jorvorskie Lane	50	2005 2006 2007 2008
8	Corey Pullig	48	1992 1993 1994 1995
9	Ryan Tannehill	47	2008 2009 2010 2011
10	Edd Hargett	46	1966 1967 1968

Single season
Rank	Player	TDs	Year
1	Johnny Manziel	47	2012
2	Johnny Manziel	46	2013
3	Jerrod Johnson	38	2009
4	Ryan Tannehill	33	2011
5	Kellen Mond	31	2018
	Marcel Reed	31	2025
7	Trevor Knight	29	2016
8	Kellen Mond	28	2019
9	Jerrod Johnson	24	2008
10	Kenny Hill	23	2014
	Kellen Mond	23	2020

== Defense ==
=== Interceptions ===
Career
Rank	Player	Ints	Years
1	Kevin Smith	20	1988 1989 1990 1991
2	Lester Hayes	14	1973 1974 1975 1976
3	Pat Thomas	13	1972 1973 1974 1975
4	John Kimbrough	12	1938 1939 1940
	Dave Elmendorf	12	1968 1969 1970
6	Joe Boring	11	1952 1953
	Bill Hobbs	11	1966 1967 1968
	Sammy Davis	11	1999 2000 2001 2002
	Jaxson Appel	11	2002 2003 2004 2005
	Kip Corrington	11	1984 1985 1986 1987

Single season
Rank	Player	Ints	Year
1	Bill Sibley	10	1941
2	Kevin Smith	9	1989
3	Joe Boring	8	1952
	Lester Hayes	8	1976
5	Bill Hobbs	7	1967
	Kevin Smith	7	1990
7	Dave Elmendorf	6	1970
	David Hoot	6	1970
	Lee Hitt	6	1971
	Pat Thomas	6	1974
	Lester Hayes	6	1975
	Aaron Glenn	6	1992

Single game
Rank	Player	Ints	Year	Opponent
1	Joe Boring	4	1952	Arkansas

=== Tackles ===
Career
Rank	Player	Tackles	Years
1	Dat Nguyen	517	1995 1996 1997 1998
2	Johnny Holland	455	1983 1984 1985 1986
3	Mike Little	448	1978 1979 1980 1981
4	Ed Simonini	425	1972 1973 1974 1975
5	Ray Childress	360	1981 1982 1983 1984

Single season
Rank	Player	Tackles	Year
1	Doug Carr	157	1978
2	Johnny Holland	155	1984
3	Larry Kelm	152	1986
4	Grady Hoermann	151	1971
5	Johnny Holland	150	1985

Single game
Rank	Player	Tackles	Year	Opponent
1	Larry Kelm	24	1985	SMU
	Larry Horton	24	1990	Baylor
3	Jacob Green	22	1979	Baylor
	Johnny Holland	22	1985	Alabama
5	Johnny Holland	20	1986	Southern Miss
	Dat Nguyen	20	1997	Kansas State
	Dat Nguyen	20	1997	UCLA (Cotton Bowl)

=== Sacks ===
Career
Rank	Player	Sacks	Years
1	Aaron Wallace	42.0	1986 1987 1988 1989
2	Jacob Green	37.0	1977 1978 1979
3	John Roper	36.0	1985 1986 1987 1988
4	Keith Mitchell	34.0	1993 1994 1995 1996
5	Von Miller	33.0	2007 2008 2009 2010
6	Myles Garrett	32.5	2014 2015 2016
7	Marcus Buckley	29.0	1990 1991 1992
8	Damontre Moore	26.5	2010 2011 2012
9	Ray Childress	25.0	1981 1982 1983 1984

Single season
Rank	Player	Sacks	Year
1	Jacob Green	20.0	1979
2	Von Miller	17.0	2009
3	Ray Childress	15.0	1983
	John Roper	15.0	1987
	John Roper	15.0	1988
6	Aaron Wallace	14.5	1988
	Keith Mitchell	14.5	1996
8	Jacob Green	13.0	1978
	William Thomas	13.0	1990
	Marcus Buckley	13.0	1991

Single game
Rank	Player	Sacks	Year	Opponent
1	Alex Morris	5.0	1987	Houston
2	Myles Garrett	4.5	2016	UTSA
3	Jacob Green	4.0	1979	Baylor
	Ray Childress	4.0	1983	Arkansas
	John Roper	4.0	1987	Arkansas
	John Roper	4.0	1987	Louisiana Tech
	Daeshon Hall	4.0	2015	Arizona State
8	Myles Garrett	3.5	2014	Louisiana-Monroe
	Myles Garrett	3.5	2015	Nevada
	Micheal Clemons	3.5	2021	LSU

== Kicking ==
=== Field goals made ===
Career
Rank	Player	FGs	Years
1	Seth Small	71	2018 2019 2020 2021
	Randy Bond	71	2022 2023 2024 2025
3	Randy Bullock	63	2008 2009 2010 2011
4	Kyle Bryant	60	1994 1995 1996 1997
5	Tony Franklin	56	1975 1976 1977 1978
	Todd Pegram	56	2002 2003 2004 2005
7	David Hardy	43	1979 1980 1981 1982
8	Scott Slater	42	1986 1987 1988
	Terry Venetoulias	42	1990 1991 1992 1993
10	Taylor Bertolet	37	2012 2013 2014 2015

Single season
Rank	Player	FGs	Year
1	Randy Bullock	29	2011
2	Randy Bond	26	2023
3	Taylor Bertolet	22	2015
	Seth Small	22	2021
5	Scott Slater	21	1986
6	Seth Small	20	2018
7	Randy Bond	20	2024
8	Alan Smith	18	1983
	Kyle Bryant	18	1996
	Kyle Bryant	18	1997
	Daniel LaCamera	18	2017
	Seth Small	18	2019

Single game
Rank	Player	FGs	Year	Opponent
1	Alan Smith	6	1983	Arkansas State
	Taylor Bertolet	6	2015	Vanderbilt
3	Tony Franklin	5	1976	Rice
	Todd Pegram	5	2004	Colorado
	Daniel LaCamera	5	2016	Auburn

=== Field goal percentage ===
Career
Rank	Player	FG%	Years
1	Josh Lambo	84.0%	2012 2013 2014
2	Randy Bullock	78.8%	2008 2009 2010 2011
3	Seth Small	78.0%	2018 2019 2020 2021
4	Daniel LaCamera	76.0%	2015 2016 2017 2018
5	Randy Bond	74.7%	2022 2023 2024 2025
6	Todd Pegram	74.7%	2002 2003 2004 2005
7	Terence Kitchens	73.2%	1998 1999 2000
8	Layne Newmann	72.2%	2004 2005 2006
9	Kyle Bryant	70.6%	1994 1995 1996 1997
10	Terry Venetoulias	70.0%	1990 1991 1992 1993

Single season
Rank	Player	FG%	Year
1	Todd Pegram	92.3%	2004
2	Randy Bullock	87.9%	2011
3	Josh Lambo	86.7%	2014
4	Daniel LaCamera	85.7%	2017
5	Seth Small	84.6%	2020
6	Randy Bond	83.3%	2024
	Terence Kitchens	83.3%	2000
8	Kyle Bryant	81.8%	1997
9	Seth Small	81.5%	2021
10	Russell Bynum	80.0%	1998
	Layne Newmann	80.0%	2006
	Josh Lambo	80.0%	2013
