= 2008 Texas A&M Aggies football team =

American college football season

2008 Texas A&M Aggies football
- Conference: Big 12 Conference
- South Division
- Record: 4–8 (2–6 Big 12)
- Head coach: Mike Sherman (1st season)
- Offensive coordinator: Nolan Cromwell (1st season)
- Offensive scheme: Multiple pro-style
- Defensive coordinator: Joe Kines (1st season)
- Base defense: 3–4
- Home stadium: Kyle Field

Uniform

2008 Big 12 Conference football standings
	Conf.			Overall
Team	W		L	W		L
North Division
No. 19 Missouri xy	5	–	3	10	–	4
Nebraska x	5	–	3	9	–	4
Kansas	4	–	4	8	–	5
Colorado	2	–	6	5	–	7
Kansas State	2	–	6	5	–	7
Iowa State	0	–	8	2	–	10
South Division
No. 5 Oklahoma xy$	7	–	1	12	–	2
No. 4 Texas x%	7	–	1	12	–	1
No. 12 Texas Tech x	7	–	1	11	–	2
No. 16 Oklahoma State	5	–	3	9	–	4
Baylor	2	–	6	4	–	8
Texas A&M	2	–	6	4	–	8
Championship: Oklahoma 62, Missouri 21
$ – BCS representative as conference champion; % – BCS at-large representative; x – Division champion/co-champions; y – Championship game participant; Rankings from AP Poll

The 2008 Texas A&M football team (often referred to as "A&M" or the "Texas Aggies") represented Texas A&M University in the 2008 NCAA Division I FBS football season. The team was led by first-year head coach Mike Sherman, who replaced Dennis Franchione after the previous season.

== Preseason ==
=== Recruiting ===
While head coach Mike Sherman was finishing his offensive coordinator duty for the Houston Texans, he contacted A&M's orally committed recruits by telephone, and hired former Nebraska recruiting coordinator Tim Cassidy—who had been the recruiting coordinator at A&M from 1989–2004—to serve as the recruiting coordinator for football. Once Sherman commenced his head coaching duties, he and his coaching staff scoured the state for speedy players, recruiting running back Cyrus Gray, wide receiver Jeffrey Fuller, linebacker Ricky Cavanaugh, defensive backs Terrence Frederick and Trent Hunter, and defensive tackle Eddie Brown. The coaches also signed five offensive lineman and three tight ends, after losing four starting offensive lineman and two starting tight ends from the 2007 season. The staff was able to retain 18 of the previous coaching staff's recruits, but lost another 3 to other schools. Jeff Fuller, Tommy Dorman, and A&M's only junior college transfer, Matt Moss, enrolled at A&M in the spring to take part in spring practices.

In all, A&M received letters of intent from 24 players on National Signing Day, which was on February 6, 2008. Of those 24, 3 ranked in ESPN's top 150 national players list, and 5 ranked in Rivals.com's top 250. 22 are from Texas. Rivals.com also included 14 of the commits on its Texas Top 100 ranking. The recruiting class was ranked No. 16 by Rivals, No. 15 by Scout.com, and No. 25 by ESPN.

Derrick Hall and Blake Chavis were not able to make the team due to academic ineligibility.

College recruiting (2008)
Name	Hometown	School	Height	Weight	40^{‡}	Commit date
Josh Ayers; OL	Euless, Texas	Trinity	6 ft 5 in (1.96 m)	282 lb (128 kg)	5	Feb 27, 2006
Josh Ayers; OL	Recruit ratings: Scout: Rivals:					
Eddie Brown; DT	Waller, Texas	Trinity	6 ft 2 in (1.88 m)	266 lb (121 kg)	4.6	Jan 24, 2008
Eddie Brown; DT	Recruit ratings: Rivals:					
Aaron Buckley; LB	Palacios, Texas	Palacios	6 ft 1 in (1.85 m)	225 lb (102 kg)	4.54	Apr 24, 2007
Aaron Buckley; LB	Recruit ratings: Scout: Rivals:					
Ricky Cavanaugh; LB	Austin, Texas	Johnson	6 ft 2 in (1.88 m)	215 lb (98 kg)	4.5	Jan 27, 2008
Ricky Cavanaugh; LB	Recruit ratings: Scout: Rivals:					
Blake Chavis; DE	Beaumont, Texas	West Brook Sr	6 ft 5 in (1.96 m)	230 lb (100 kg)	N/A	Mar 12, 2007
Blake Chavis; DE	Recruit ratings: Scout: Rivals:					
LeRoy Chevalier; OL	Houston, Texas	Yates	6 ft 6 in (1.98 m)	325 lb (147 kg)	N/A	Jan 11, 2008
LeRoy Chevalier; OL	Recruit ratings: Scout: Rivals:					
Rod Davis; DT	Aldine, Texas	Eisenhower	6 ft 2 in (1.88 m)	300 lb (140 kg)	N/A	Feb 6, 2008
Rod Davis; DT	Recruit ratings: Scout: Rivals:					
Tommy Dorman; QB	North Richland Hills, Texas	Birdville	6 ft 3 in (1.91 m)	204 lb (93 kg)	4.63	Feb 17, 2007
Tommy Dorman; QB	Recruit ratings: Scout: Rivals: (78)					
Adren Dorsey; DT	Tyler, Texas	John Tyler	6 ft 4 in (1.93 m)	285 lb (129 kg)	4.8	Sep 26, 2007
Adren Dorsey; DT	Recruit ratings: Scout: Rivals:					
Terrence Frederick; DB	Katy, Texas	Katy	5 ft 10 in (1.78 m)	170 lb (77 kg)	4.45	Feb 4, 2008
Terrence Frederick; DB	Recruit ratings: Scout: Rivals:					
Jeff Fuller; WR	McKinney, Texas	Boyd	6 ft 4 in (1.93 m)	202 lb (92 kg)	4.5	Dec 9, 2007
Jeff Fuller; WR	Recruit ratings: Scout: Rivals: (80)					
Keon Furtch; DB	Paris, Texas	Paris	6 ft 2 in (1.88 m)	180 lb (82 kg)	4.5	Mar 5, 2007
Keon Furtch; DB	Recruit ratings: Scout: Rivals:					
Cyrus Gray; RB	DeSoto, Texas	DeSoto	6 ft 0 in (1.83 m)	188 lb (85 kg)	4.4	Jan 27, 2008
Cyrus Gray; RB	Recruit ratings: Scout: Rivals:					
Derrick Hall; ATH	Beaumont, Texas	Central Senior	5 ft 10 in (1.78 m)	201 lb (91 kg)	4.35	Jan 11, 2008
Derrick Hall; ATH	Recruit ratings: Scout: Rivals:					
Trent Hunter; DB	Katy, Texas	Katy	5 ft 10 in (1.78 m)	189 lb (86 kg)	4.5	Dec 18, 2007
Trent Hunter; DB	Recruit ratings: Scout: Rivals:					
Jeffrey Hyde; OL	Colleyville, Texas	Covenant Christian Academy	6 ft 7 in (2.01 m)	295 lb (134 kg)	N/A	Feb 6, 2007
Jeffrey Hyde; OL	Recruit ratings: Scout: Rivals:					
Tony Jerod; DE	DeSoto, Texas	DeSoto	6 ft 5 in (1.96 m)	255 lb (116 kg)	4.6	Feb 6, 2007
Tony Jerod; DE	Recruit ratings: Scout: Rivals:					
Chris Lathrop; OL	Cypress, Texas	Cyfair	6 ft 4 in (1.93 m)	288 lb (131 kg)	4.9	May 21, 2007
Chris Lathrop; OL	Recruit ratings: Scout: Rivals:					
Kyle Mangan; LB	Brenham, Texas	Brenham	6 ft 2 in (1.88 m)	225 lb (102 kg)	4.6	May 17, 2007
Kyle Mangan; LB	Recruit ratings: Scout: Rivals:					
Matt Moss; DE	El Cajon, California	Grossmont College	6 ft 4 in (1.93 m)	270 lb (120 kg)	4.7	May 13, 2007
Matt Moss; DE	Recruit ratings: Scout: Rivals: (–)					
Brian Thomas; OL	Pearland, Texas	Pearland	6 ft 3 in (1.91 m)	265 lb (120 kg)	5	Jan 29, 2007
Brian Thomas; OL	Recruit ratings: Scout: Rivals:					
Joe Villavisencio; OL	Jacksonville, Texas	Jacksonville	6 ft 4 in (1.93 m)	305 lb (138 kg)	N/A	Jan 30, 2007
Joe Villavisencio; OL	Recruit ratings: Scout: Rivals:					
K.J. Williams; ATH	Norman, Oklahoma	Norman North	6 ft 4 in (1.93 m)	235 lb (107 kg)	4.73	Jul 20, 2007
K.J. Williams; ATH	Recruit ratings: Scout: Rivals:					
Andrew Wolridge; DE	Lexington, Texas	Lexington	6 ft 2 in (1.88 m)	235 lb (107 kg)	4.5	May 24, 2007
Andrew Wolridge; DE	Recruit ratings: Scout: Rivals:					
Overall recruit ranking:
‡ Refers to 40-yard dash; Note: In many cases, Scout, Rivals, 247Sports, On3, and ESPN may conflict in their listings of height, weight and 40 time.; In these cases, the average was taken. ESPN grades are on a 100-point scale.; Sources: "Texas A&M Commit List for 2008". Rivals.; "Texas A&M: Commits". Scout.; "{{{espn ref title}}}". ESPN.; "Scout.com Team Recruiting Rankings". Scout.; "2008 Team Ranking". Rivals.com.

=== Players ===
==== Position changes ====
During the preseason, Coach Sherman made some player adjustments to fit his pro-style offensive scheme. Von Miller, who was a backup defensive end last season, and Garrick Williams, his high school teammate, were moved to outside linebacker. Safety Jordan Pugh was shifted to cornerback, which he played in high school. Devin Gregg moved to free safety from strong safety. Jordan Peterson, after playing two seasons at cornerback, became a safety. Jamie McCoy, who moved from quarterback to wide receiver the previous season, shifted to tight end. Defensive back Chevar Bryson and Kenny Brown became wideouts. Running back Jorvorskie Lane is losing weight to make the move from tailback to fullback. Billy Chavis made the move from linebacker to tight end.

Starting quarterback Stephen McGee recovered from surgery he had on his non-throwing shoulder in January 2008, causing him to miss most of the spring drills. He competed with sophomore Jerrod Johnson and freshman Ryan Tannehill for the starting position. He was named the starter for the season-opener against Arkansas State, but continued to compete for the job for the remainder of the season.

The Aggies are looking to improve their offensive line, after losing three starters, including two who earned all-Big 12 honors. They also are looking to field adequate linebackers and tight ends.

==== Departures ====
- On May 28, 2008, freshman linebacker Derrick Stephens, who redshirted in 2007, was forced to quit playing football due to multiple concussions. The school chose to honor his scholarship, and he planned to apply to the business school.
- On June 6, 2008, kicker Matt Szymanski transferred to SMU for personal reasons.
- On August 28, 2008, running back Cornell Tarrant transferred to Stephen F. Austin State University due to undisclosed personal reasons.

==== Honors ====
Justin Brantly made the preseason All-Big 12 team and was also a Ray Guy Award candidate. Running back Mike Goodson and fullback Jorvorskie Lane were two of 75 college players named to the 2008 Maxwell Award watch list. Additionally, quarterback Stephen McGee, along with 25 other quarterbacks, appeared on the 2008 Johnny Unitas Golden Arm Award watch list.

=== Spring game ===
The Aggies played their spring intrasquad Maroon and White exhibition game on April 19, 2008 at 6:00 p.m. The game attracted 32,000 fans, including more than 100 college football prospects from the class of 2009. The game featured a new format of two halves. The first half featured a two-quarter game that pitted the Texas A&M team, led by quarterbacks Stephen McGee and Tommy Dorman, and the Texas Aggies team, led by quarterbacks Jerrod Johnson and Ryan Tannehill. The second half consisted of situational work, including the red zone, overtime, goal line, and two-minute drills. Two honorary student coaches, who were selected by the coaching staff and players, also served during the game. Each student coach gave their respective team a pre-game speech and interacted with players, coaches, and staff on the sidelines during the game.

On the opening drive of the game, running back Mike Goodson picked up 58 yards on 8 carries, and McGee ended the drive with a 1-yard bootleg play to the endzone. On the next drive, led by Johnson, Bradley Stephens ran 41 yards on 5 carries, though the drive ended on a 44-yard field goal by Matt Szymanski. Dorman led the ensuing drive, and Cornell Tarrant eventually scored a touchdown on a 40-yard run. The Texas A&M team defeated the Texas Aggies 14–3. Tarrant became the leading rusher of the game with his 59 yards on 4 carries. McGee was the game's leading passer, completing 5-of-8 passes for 58 yards, though none of the passes were to a wide receiver. Converted tight end Jamie McCoy was the leading receiver with two catches for 31 yards, including a 25-yard catch thrown by McGee. Tannehill completed 6-of-10 passes for 50 yards, while Johnson was 3-of-5 for 25 yards. In the goal-line drill of the second half, defensive back Chevar Bryson made a length-of-the-field interception return for a touchdown. Jorvorskie Lane did not play due to a stomach virus.

Head coach Mike Sherman commended the running backs, especially Mike Goodson, calling him a "very dangerous weapon". Though the Aggies didn't run any option plays in the game, the play-calling was run-heavy, as was planned. Sherman stated that they had a running game because they "wanted to show some toughness, not just throw it around".

=== Rankings and predictions ===
In June 2008, Rivals.com ranked the team 65th out of 119 Division I FBS teams. A Sporting News writer ranked the team No. 48 in his 2008 top 50 list. Sports Illustrated ranked the Aggies 51st out of the 119 national teams. A Washington Times columnist placed the team 65th, while an Orlando Sentinel reporter ranked it 38th.

Another Sporting News writer ranked the team's nonconference schedule the 4th toughest in the Big 12. A Tulsa World sports columnist rated the Aggies 9th in the Big 12 in July 2008.

In June 2008, ESPN's Mark Schlabach predicted the team would face the Oregon State Beavers in the Brut Sun Bowl. In July 2008, ESPN's Tim Griffin picked the team to go to the Texas Bowl to face longtime Southwest Conference rival SMU. The Rivals.com staff predicted that A&M will not play in a bowl this season. The 2008 edition of Dave Campbell's Texas Football predicted the team would finish the season with an 8–4 record. Point-Spreads.com, a spread betting website, projected the Aggies to go 5–7. The official Big 12 Media Preseason Poll picked the Aggies to finish fifth in the Big 12 South.

The Oklahoman ranked the wide receiver corps last in the Big 12. The same writer ranked the defensive line 10th, and the linebackers 10th as well. The Kansas City Star rated the quarterbacks 10th, the running backs 1st, the offensive line 8th, the wide receivers and tight ends 12th, the defensive line 12th, the linebackers 11th, the defensive backs 5th, and the special teams 6th.

The team did not rank in the preseason AP or Coaches polls. It did receive 3 votes in the Coaches Poll, however.

== Coaching staff ==
After former coach Dennis Franchione resigned on November 23, 2007, former Green Bay Packers head coach Mike Sherman, who was the Houston Texans' offensive coordinator at the time, was hired three days later, becoming the 28th head coach of the Texas A&M football program. Sherman chose to finish his term with the Houston Texans before working full-time as the Aggies' head coach. The Texans ended their regular season December 30, 2007. During that period, Sherman contacted A&M's orally committed recruits by telephone, and hired former Nebraska recruiting coordinator Tim Cassidy—who had been the recruiting coordinator at A&M from 1989–2004—to serve as the recruiting coordinator as well as the associate athletic director for football. Once Sherman started his job full-time, he named Seattle Seahawks wide receivers coach Nolan Cromwell to be his offensive coordinator and Reggie Herring to be his defensive coordinator. Herring, however, resigned a month later and became the linebackers coach for the Dallas Cowboys. Sherman worked with Cromwell under head coach Mike Holmgren at Green Bay. On January 9, 2008, Sherman announced Buddy Wyatt would coach the defensive line. Wyatt had 18 years of collegiate coaching experience, including 3 seasons at A&M from 2000–02. In 2001, the Aggie defense ranked 10th in the nation. Sherman also retained defensive backs coach Van Malone, who coached under Franchione for the 2006–07 seasons. Malone is the only member from Franchione's staff to be retained. Shortly afterwards, Charles McMillan, who worked at TCU from 2004–07 as the cornerbacks coach, was announced to also coach the defensive backs. Former Boston College offensive line coach Jim Turner, as well as former NFL running back Randy Jordan, will coach the offensive line and running backs, respectively. Former Green Bay Packers coach Tom Rossley was hired to coach the quarterbacks. Former Alabama defensive coordinator Joe Kines was hired to replace Herring, and was also named the assistant head coach. Former Denver Broncos coach Kirk Doll, who also coached at A&M from 1988–93, was hired to be the tight ends and special teams coach.

Name	Position	Alma mater (Year)	Year at A&M
Mike Sherman	Head coach	Central Connecticut State (1978)	1st
Nolan Cromwell	Offensive coordinator	Kansas (1977)	1st
Tom Rossley	Quarterbacks	Cincinnati (1969)	1st
Randy Jordan	Running backs	North Carolina (1993)	1st
Jim Turner	Offensive line	Boston College (1988)	1st
Kirk Doll	Special teams Tight ends	East Carolina; Wichita State (1976)	1st
Joe Kines	Defensive coordinator Assistant head coach	Jacksonville State (1967)	1st
Buddy Wyatt	Defensive line	TCU (1990)	1st
Van Malone	Defensive backs	Texas (1993)	3rd
Charles McMillian	Defensive backs	Utah State (1995)	1st
Dave Kennedy	Strength and conditioning	Nebraska (1985)	1st

== Depth chart ==
Defensive starters

FS
Jordan Peterson (5)
Jonathan Batson (1)
Trent Hunter (20)

CB
Jordan Pugh (25)
Justin McQueen (21)
Marcus Gold (2)
or Terrence Frederick (7)

OLB	MLB	OLB
Jonathan Haynes (42)	Matt Featherston (46)	Garrick Williams (32)
or Von Miller (40)	or Anthony Lewis (36)	or Derek Dumas (53)

DE	DT	DT	DE
Cyril Obiozor (49)	Kellen Heard (91)	Lucas Patterson (77)	Michael Bennett (11)
or Paul Freeney (93)	Eddie Brown (19)	David Tufuga (99)	or Amos Gbunblee (86)
	or Tony Jerod-Eddie (83)		

ROV
Alton Dixon (9)
Devin Gregg (26)

CB
Arkeith Brown (18)
Danny Gorrer (4)

Offensive starters

WR
Howard Morrow (5)
Pierre Brown (6)

LT	LG	C	RG	RT
Michael Shumard (76)	Evan Eike (65)	Kevin Matthews(63)	Lee Grimes (74)	Travis Schneider (75)
Josh Ayers (72)	or Brian Thomas (71)	Danny Baker (55)	Chris Lathrop (78)	Robbie Frost (79)
	or Vincent Williams (61)		or Joe Villavisencio (67)	Jeffrey Hyde (62)

TE
Jamie McCoy (4)
Harold Turnage (90)
or Frank Avery (89)

WR
Ryan Tannehill (17)
Jeff Fuller (8)
Terrence McCoy (83)
or Drew Williamson (9)

QB
Stephen McGee (7)
Jerrod Johnson (1)
Ryan Tannehill (17)

FB
Jorvorskie Lane (11)
or Nick LaMantia (44)
or Anthony Vela (29)

TB
Mike Goodson (3)
Bradley Stephens (20)
or Keondra Smith (26)
or Cyrus Gray (32)

== Schedule ==
Date	Time	Opponent	Site	TV	Result	Attendance
August 30	6:00 p.m.	Arkansas State*	Kyle Field; College Station, TX		L 14–18	78,691
September 6	4:00 p.m.	at New Mexico*	University Stadium; Albuquerque, NM	Versus	W 28–22	28,007
September 20	2:30 p.m.	Miami (FL)*	Kyle Field; College Station, TX	ABC	L 23–41	84,165
September 27	11:30 a.m.	Army*	Kyle Field; College Station, TX (AT&T Corps Classic)	Versus	W 21–17	84,090
October 4	6:05 p.m.	at No. 21 Oklahoma State	Boone Pickens Stadium; Stillwater, OK		L 28–56	51,147
October 11	1:00 p.m.	Kansas State	Kyle Field; College Station, TX		L 30–44	78,669
October 18	11:00 a.m.	No. 7 Texas Tech	Kyle Field; College Station, TX (rivalry)	FSN	L 25–43	86,012
October 25	6:00 p.m.	at Iowa State	Jack Trice Stadium; Ames, IA	FCS	W 49–35	45,495
November 1	1:00 p.m.	Colorado	Kyle Field; College Station, TX		W 24–17	78,121
November 8	2:30 p.m.	No. 6 Oklahoma	Kyle Field; College Station, TX	ABC	L 28–66	85,603
November 15	3:05 p.m.	at Baylor	Floyd Casey Stadium; Waco, TX (Battle of the Brazos)		L 21–41	43,549
November 27	8:00 p.m.	at No. 4 Texas	Darrell K Royal–Texas Memorial Stadium; Austin, TX (rivalry)	ESPN	L 9–49	98,621
*Non-conference game; Rankings from AP Poll released prior to the game; All times are in Central time

== Game summaries ==
=== Arkansas State ===
	1	2	3	4	Total
Arkansas State	3	0	6	9	18
Texas A&M	7	7	0	0	14

This marked the fourth meeting between the Aggies and the Arkansas State Red Wolves, a member of the Sun Belt Conference. A&M went into the game with a 3–0 all-time record against the Red Wolves; the third game occurred in 2003, the Aggies' 4–8 season. This was Arkansas State's first football game with its new nickname of "Red Wolves". Previously, Arkansas State's sports teams had been nicknamed "Indians" in honor of the Osage Nation that inhabited the area until the 1800s. The use of an Indian mascot was the subject of ongoing controversy, including NCAA restrictions on the use of the mascot.

Arkansas State, which finished 5–7 the previous season, returned six ;starters on offense and five on defense. Experience was lacking on the team's secondary, where the Red Wolves must replace all four starters, and the offensive line, which has only one returning starter. Key players include junior quarterback Corey Leonard, who set school records for total yards and passing touchdowns in 2007, as well as junior tailback Reggie Arnold, who rushed for more than 1,000 yards the previous two seasons. Arkansas State was predicted to finish fourth in its conference by the preseason Sun Belt Conference coaches' poll.

ASU compiled 60 yards on the game opening possession, ending it with a 37-yard field goal. A&M answered with a 69-yard drive that resulted in a 9-yard touchdown run by tailback Mike Goodson. On their next possession, Arkansas State lost a fumble, allowing the Aggies to take over on downs on the A&M 28-yard line. The Aggies eventually moved to the Red Wolves 15-yard line, but faced a fourth-down situation. Kicker Richie Bean missed a 32-yard field goal to keep the score at 7–3. The Red Wolves' ensuing drive led to a punt, which A&M recovered at its 23-yard line. McGee cranked up A&M's passing game after making completions of 5, 13, 12, and 16 yards. Goodson soon scored a touchdown on a 7-yard run. Bean added the extra point to give A&M a 14–3 lead with 4:23 left in the half. Neither team could advance the ball for a touchdown over the remainder of the half.

In the second half, the Aggies' had four turnovers, three of which led to ASU scoring drives. Posting just 103 offensive yards – including 9 rushing – A&M failed to score on all eight of its possessions. In the third quarter, an interception and a fumble recovery let the Red Wolves to score two field goals, cutting the score to 14–9. In the fourth quarter, A&M kicker Richie Bean kicked a 25-yard field goal wide right. After the missed field goal, the ball was spotted on the ASU 20-yard line. ASU drove 80 yards into A&M territory for a touchdown to take the lead. Although their two-point conversion pass was incomplete, the Red Wolves could maintain their 15–14 advantage with 4:39 remaining in the game. On their next possession, the Aggies lost the ball on a fumble by Goodson after four plays. This set up ASU to kick its fourth successful field goal of the game to extend its lead to 18–14. Once the clock went down to 1:12, the Aggies looked to score on their final drive in order to win the game. On the third play of the drive, McGee threw a 26-yard pass to third-string quarterback Ryan Tannehill to move the ball to the ASU 39. Two subsequent passes to Goodson allowed only a net gain of 5 yards, and on fourth down – with 7 seconds remaining – McGee threw another interception. ASU ran out the clock to preserve their 18–14 victory.

Goodson had his third career 100-yard rushing game. He was three yards short of breaking his game record of 127 yards, compiled against Oklahoma his freshman season. Third-string quarterback Ryan Tannehill was the leader in receiving yards in the game, with 5 catches for 59 yards. McGee hit the 5,000-passing yards mark, becoming the fifth all-time A&M quarterback to do so. His two interceptions in the game was also the second time of his career in which he threw two or more interceptions. The first time occurred against Texas in 2007. Jorvorskie Lane received only a few snaps and no carries or catches in the game due to a neck injury he got during one of the August practices. The defense compiled only three tackles for a loss. Linebacker Matt Featherston posted a game-high of 16 stops, and safety Arkeith Brown made 11 tackles with two pass breakups. Featherston was the second player in the nation with the most tackles during the first week.

The game attracted the second-largest home opener crowd of 78,691. By losing the game, A&M broke a 20-game winning streak in home openers. ASU captured its first victory against a Big 12 team after 14 tries. It was also their first season-opening road victory since joining Division I-A in 1992. The game was called "one of the most embarrassing losses in [A&M] history" by several sport columnists. The team's performance also placed 5th in ESPN's Bottom 10 weekly rankings.

=== New Mexico ===
	1	2	3	4	Total
Texas A&M	14	7	0	7	28
New Mexico	7	0	3	12	22

Prior to this meeting, A&M had only played the Lobos once in 1926, shutting them out 63–0 at College Station. Former A&M head coach Dennis Franchione coached the Lobos from 1992–97, leading them to a Western Athletic Conference Mountain Division Championship in 1997 and their first bowl appearance since 1961. The Lobos lost the game, and Franchione later resigned to take the head coaching position at TCU. Rocky Long has since taken over and led the Lobos to their first bowl victory since 1961 at the 2007 New Mexico Bowl.

UNM signed a home-and-home deal with the Aggies after the 2006 season. Shortly after signing the deal, UNM was approached by an unidentified third party that offered US$1.5 million to move the game to San Antonio. UNM rejected the offer, and the offer was increased to $1.8 million by June 2007. The Lobos declined the offer again, stating that they needed to build fan loyalty at home.

In their opener, UNM lost 26–3 to conference opponent TCU. Senior running back Rodney Ferguson, who posted 1,000-yard back-to-back seasons, rushed for only 59 yards in the game. Quarterback Donovan Porterie sat out in the game after throwing 4-of-10 passes for 37 yards, one interception, and losing one fumble that caused his neck injury. UNM's backup quarterback threw 3-of-14 passes for 93 yards, including one catch for 81.

The Aggies started the game on offense and did not see any success on their first drive. Quarterback Stephen McGee had to sit out after the first drive due to a right shoulder strain, causing Jerrod Johnson to replace him. McGee did not see any action afterwards. The Lobos began their first drive on their 5-yard line. On their second third-down possession, Porterie threw an interception to safety Jordan Peterson, who returned the ball 48 yards for a touchdown. This was the first time A&M scored a defensive touchdown since the Wyoming game in 2004. The touchdown was also significant in that the Lobos had lost 10 of its previous meetings in which the opponent scored first. On their next possession, the Lobos gave up the ball once Porterie threw yet another pick, which set the ball for the Aggies at the UNM 20. On third down, Jerrod Johnson threw a touchdown to receiver Jeff Fuller. The Lobos answered with a 45-yard touchdown run by Ferguson on their next possession to cut A&M's lead to 14–7. In the second quarter, both teams failed to move to score on two respective drives. On their final drive of the half, the Aggies drove the ball for 93 yards on 14 plays, ending it with another touchdown pass to Fuller. After an unsuccessful UNM drive, A&M left the field for halftime leading 21–7.

Early in the third quarter, the Lobos scored on a 27-yard field goal, thanks in part to an A&M muffed punt which the Lobos recovered at A&M's 14. Trouble hit the Lobos again when Porterie mishandled a snap, which led to a fumble recovery by defensive end Michael Bennett. Bennett returned the ball for 37 yards and stepped out of the field at the UNM 22. Johnson ended the drive on a 9-yard pass to tight end Jamie McCoy. With 6 minutes left in the game, the Lobos found the end zone on a 5-yard run, though a subsequent two-point conversion failed. The Aggies used their next drive to run out the clock, but eventually had to give the ball back to the Lobos on a punt. The Lobos were able to move 92 yards on 17 plays, capping it with a rushing touchdown by Ferguson. The Lobos then looked to gain the lead with less than a minute in the game, but missed the onside kick recovery. A&M ran out the clock and preserved their 28–22 victory. This victory was a milestone in that it was the first non-conference road victory for A&M since the win over Pittsburgh in 2002.

Jerrod Johnson finished the game with 10-of-19 pass completions (including three touchdowns) for 124 yards. Tailback Mike Goodson was held only to 6 carries for 9 yards. Goodson left the game early due to a sprained right knee, although he did return to play for some time in the second half. Fullback Jorvorskie Lane got more playing time, and compiled 19 yards on seven carries. Head coach Mike Sherman stated that Jorvorskie could block and play better than he did in the game. Ryan Tannehill made three receptions for 57 yards, while Jeff Fuller caught 3 for 36. Cyrus Gray finished with 29 rushing yards on 10 carries.

As for UNM, Rodney Ferguson ran for 135 yards and two touchdowns on 19 carries. Donovan Proterie completed 22-of-35 for 154 yards, though threw two interceptions.

=== Miami (FL) ===
	1	2	3	4	Total
Miami (FL)	14	10	17	0	41
Texas A&M	10	0	7	6	23

This was the third meeting between the two teams. In their first meeting in 1944, the Aggies won 70–14 at the Hurricanes' home field. The 1944 game remains to be Miami's worst loss in their football history. In their second meeting in 2007, Miami upset the 16th-ranked Aggies 34–17 in their home field, which was the Orange Bowl. The Canes finished 5–7 that season, which was their worst in 30 years. A&M's speed did not match that of Miami's, which is part of the reason why the Canes blanked A&M 31–0 in the first three quarters. This was the second time that a Florida team plays at Kyle Field. Florida State first played at the stadium in 1967.

Coming off a bye week, the Aggies looked to regroup at home. After their first two games, the Aggies ranked last in the Big 12 in every major offensive category: scoring offense (21 points per game), rushing yards (112.5), passing yards (157), total offense (269.5 yards), pass efficiency (126), first downs (34) and sacks allowed (seven). Part of the off week was used to practice specific schemes, including third-down and short yardage, which hadn't been worked on in weeks. Quarterback Stephen McGee underwent an MRI on the Monday of the bye week (i.e. directly following the New Mexico game), and the MRI revealed that he suffered a sprained and slightly separated right shoulder. He was not able to practice that week. The following week, both McGee and Jerrod Johnson took snaps during practice. Tailback Mike Goodson, after suffering a mild ankle sprain in the New Mexico game, did not miss any practice time. Third-string quarterback Ryan Tannehill may miss the game due to a sprained ankle from the previous game.

Miami, among other things, aimed to improve its passing offense, which had ranked 106th nationally (out of 119 Division I FBS teams). The Canes lost an away game to Florida 26–3, after holding the Gators to 7 points before the fourth quarter. ESPN's Kirk Herbstreit stated that the Canes' play against A&M might determine whether they (Miami) turn out to be a surprise team this season. The 113th-nationally ranked A&M rushing defense, which gave up 255 and 216 rushing yards to Arkansas State and New Mexico, respectively, could catch a break in this game as Miami lost its starting running back in Javarris James, who sprained his right ankle early in the Florida game. Miami's speed on defense outmatches that of the Aggies. The Canes' defense had ranked 8th nationally 17 tackles for a loss. However, they have yet to produce a turnover.

=== Army ===
	1	2	3	4	Total
Army	0	7	3	7	17
Texas A&M	0	14	7	0	21

This was the fourth game in the series between the Army Black Knights and the Aggies, and the second of the AT&T Corps Classic. Army's lone trip to College Station was in 1972, the only time they defeated A&M. The third game, which was played in the Alamodome in 2006, was the debut of the AT&T Corps Classic. The Black Knights failed to score in the final drive of the game, and A&M escaped with a 28–24 victory.

Army had lost all of its previous three home games to Temple, New Hampshire, and Akron. The Black Knights had been outscored 85–20, and did not score more than 10 points in each of those games. Over the past two seasons, they posted a 1–9 record in away games. Using its triple option attack, Army had averaged 179 rushing yards per game, ranking 41st in the country. Its 118th-ranked passing offense, however, had recorded only 77 yards per game. The offense had also lost 10 fumbles, the most of any Division I team. On the other side of the ball, the Black Knights had limited their opposition to 309.7 ypg. The defense had also produced five turnovers, though the front line had only forced two sacks in the first three games.

=== Oklahoma State ===
	1	2	3	4	Total
Texas A&M	7	0	7	14	28
#22 Oklahoma State	21	7	14	14	56

The Aggies had a four-game winning streak coming into their 24th meeting with the Oklahoma State Cowboys. They also had held a 7–3 record for games played at Stillwater. In the 2007 home game, after trailing 17–0 at the end of the first half, the Aggies matched their largest comeback in school history to defeat the Cowboys 24–23. In the 2006 meeting at Stillwater, the Aggies defeated the Cowboys 34–33 in overtime, after defensive tackle Red Bryant blocked the overtime field goal attempt that would have tied the game at 34–34 and started a second overtime.

OSU entered the game with a nationally ranked No. 1 rushing offense, No. 3 scoring offense, and No. 4 total offense. The Aggies, on the other hand, came in with a 115th-ranked rushing defense, and a scoring and total offense that had placed last in the Big 12. OSU, which was ranked in the top 25 for the first time since 2004, was a 24-point favorite.

In the first half, OSU outscored A&M 28–7. The Cowboys gained a 7–0 lead when defensive end Ugo Chinasa returned an interception 6 yards for a touchdown. The Cowboys scored again with Zac Robinson's 29-yard throw to Dez Bryant to make the score 14–0. Bryant later ran a 78-yard punt return for another touchdown to extend the lead to 21–0. ESPN's SportsCenter called Bryant's touchdown return the No. 1 play of the night. A&M finally answered with Mike Goodson running an 80-yard touchdown, the longest of his career. There were five A&M turnovers in the first half alone. OSU did not convert on three lost A&M fumbles.

=== Kansas State ===
	1	2	3	4	Total
Kansas State	7	20	3	14	44
Texas A&M	3	7	6	14	30

The Aggies came into the game with an 8–4 all-time record with the Kansas State Wildcats, and a 5-game winning streak, which started in 1998 when the Aggies defeated the Wildcats 36–33 (in two overtimes) to win the Big 12 Championship. The Wildcats are led by third-year head coach Ron Prince, who led the Wildcats to a 7–6 record and an appearance in the Texas Bowl in 2006, and a 5–7 record in 2007. In both seasons, however, he led his team to upset the Texas Longhorns, who were ranked among the top 10 in the national polls coming into the matchups. Coach Prince used his 2008 junior college transfers to strengthen the team's play.

A few players had to sit out during the game due to injuries, including offensive linemen Travis Schneider, Michael Shumard and Robbie Frost. Lineman Lee Grimes played three different positions in order to counter the injuries. Mike Goodson had to sit out the first quarter since he missed class during the week.

Kansas State opened the game with an 81-yard touchdown drive, which consisted of 31 rushing yards by quarterback Josh Freeman. Immediately afterwards, A&M settled for a field goal on their possession, after driving 73 yards deep into K-State territory. In the second quarter, the Wildcats' special teams unit blocked their fourth punt of the season, and returned the blocked punt for a 10-yard touchdown. Safety Courtney Herndon was able to pick up his third blocked punt of the season in the process. Punter Justin Brantly had his first punt block after 129 attempts (his last blocked punt occurred in the 2005 Texas game). The Wildcats failed to score the extra point to keep the score at 13–3. After another unsuccessful A&M drive, Kansas State opened up its passing game in a drive that consisted of 10, 20, 15, 7, and 5 receptions. The drive ended on a 4-yard touchdown run by Logan Dold, and the subsequent extra point extended K-State's lead to 20–3. On their next possession, the Aggies fumbled on KSU's 48-yard-line, and one of the Wildcat defenders returned the fumble for 10 yards. This eventually allowed the Wildcats to compile another scoring drive, moving the score up to 27–3. Prior to halftime, A&M finally got a touchdown on a 7-play, 80-yard drive, which was capped by a 38-yard catch by Howard Morrow, who had yet to make an impact this season. Jorvorskie Lane scored the touchdown on a 4th-and-1 situation at the KSU 1. With his 46th touchdown of his career, Lane became the all-time school record holder in rushing touchdowns. The previous record of 45 was held by Darren Lewis (1987–90).

The Aggies started the second half and were able to advance the ball 54 yards using a balanced rushing and passing attack. They missed the opportunity to move past the KSU 33 on 4th-and-8, and had to turn the ball over on downs. K-State used the drive to make a 49-yard field goal. With 7:53 remaining in the third quarter, A&M utilized its passing game to move the ball, thanks in part to two 22-yard receptions, one made by Jeff Fuller, and the other completed by Ryan Tannehill. Jerrod Johnson rushed to the endzone from the KSU 5. Randy Bullock, however, missed the extra point. Still trailing 30–16, the Aggies looked to pull a comeback. Hopes of a comeback diminished when Jorvorskie Lane's second attempt at scoring on a short goal-line rush failed. A&M had to turnover on downs once again, despite moving the ball for 62 yards and just a yard shy of scoring. K-State used its rushing game to drain out the clock a little, and successfully ended the drive on a 1-yard run by Josh Freeman. Less than 5 minutes remained in the game once A&M got the ball. Johnson made 3 consecutive completions to Tannehill worth 50 yards, and Goodson scored on the next play via a 23-yard reception. After their quick touchdown, the Aggies attempted an onside kick, which was recovered by K-State at the A&M 41. The Wildcats ran the ball once again, and were rewarded yet another touchdown to extend their lead to 44–23. About a minute was left, and on the second play of A&M's last possession, Johnson connected to Tannehill for a 55-yard touchdown. The Aggies tried another onside kick, but K-State found the ball and preserved their 44–30 win.

With this loss, A&M dropped to 0–2 in conference play, the program's worst start since 1982. KSU left with their first win at Kyle Field since 1996. On a brighter note, Tannehill's 210 yards from 12 catches are the 3rd-best of all A&M receivers in a single game. Johnson's 487 offensive yards and 419 passing yards went down on A&M's record books as the best ever.

=== Texas Tech ===
	1	2	3	4	Total
#5 Texas Tech	7	13	10	13	43
Texas A&M	10	13	0	2	25

The Aggies had led the all-time series with the Texas Tech Red Raiders 34–31–1, though the Red Raiders had won 10 of the past 13 games. The last victory at Kyle Field was in 2004, when the game went into overtime. Ninth-year Texas Tech head coach Mike Leach had held a 6–2 record against the Aggies. The Red Raiders had led the nation in passing offense and are second in total offense, due in part to Sammy Baugh Trophy winning quarterback Graham Harrell and unanimous first-team All-American receiver Michael Crabtree. In fact, Leach's spread offense philosophy has allowed the Red Raiders to rank among the top 10 passing offense teams in the country ever since the 2001 season. Sports bettors favored Tech to win by 21 points.

In the first half, A&M outgained Tech 274 yards to 254, and led 23–20. A&M did not produce any turnovers, while Tech gave away 2 possessions to A&M. A&M scored 10 points off Tech's turnovers, but Tech was able to score on its other possessions. In the second half, however, the Aggies could only post 32 offensive yards and 5 first downs. Harrell completed 44-of-56 throws for 450 yards, three touchdowns, and two interceptions. He also scored touchdowns on two rushes. Crabtree scored two touchdowns off of his eight catches for 71 yards.

=== Iowa State ===
	1	2	3	4	Total
Iowa State	7	10	3	15	35
Texas A&M	7	21	7	14	49

The Aggies had held an undefeated 7–0 record against the Cyclones until the 2005 meeting, when they lost 42–14 at Kyle Field. The Cyclones were led by Dan McCarney, who was 0–6 against the Aggies until that matchup. McCarney resigned from Iowa State in 2006 to accept an assistant coaching position at South Florida. Former Texas Longhorns co-defensive coordinator Gene Chizik, who coached the Longhorns to their national championship in 2005, was hired to replace him. Chizik led the Cyclones to a 3–9 record in the 2007 season.

Both teams went into the game with the same overall record and were still looking to get their first conference win. Both Iowa State's and A&M's defenses had ranked 98th and 101st in the nation, respectively. Iowa State's secondary had allowed Baylor and Nebraska to complete 78 percent of their passes. Sports bettors predicted Iowa State to beat A&M by three points.

=== Colorado ===
	1	2	3	4	Total
Colorado	7	3	0	7	17
Texas A&M	0	3	21	0	24

Coming into the game, the Aggies had held a 2–5 overall record against the Colorado Buffaloes. Of the three games that were played at Kyle Field, the Aggies had only won the 2004 contest. In the preseason, the Buffaloes acquired Darrell Scott, who was ranked the best running back in the 2008 recruiting class by Rivals.com. In their previous game, the Buffaloes suffered a 58–0 shutout at the hands of No. 16 Missouri. Both teams bought an even matchup to the field, with Colorado fielding an offense that had scored 19 points per game, whereas A&M's scoring defense had allowed 35 points per game. The Aggie defense had given up a total of 1,584 in their past three games against Iowa State, Texas Tech, and Kansas State. A&M was favored to win by 3.5 points.

=== Oklahoma ===
	1	2	3	4	Total
#6 Oklahoma	21	17	28	0	66
Texas A&M	0	14	7	7	28

Oklahoma head coach Bob Stoops came in 3–1 against the Aggies in games played at Kyle Field. All three of their victories had been decided within one touchdown. In the offseason, a columnist for The Oklahoman stated "Sooner-Aggie games at Kyle Field have been classics this decade." In the 2000 game, the Sooners intercepted a pass by Mark Farris and returned it for a touchdown to win 35–31. They eventually ended up winning the 2000 national title. In 2002, the Aggies upset then-ranked No. 1 Oklahoma 30–26. The Sooners came into the 2004 game ranked No. 2, and scored a touchdown with 6:43 remaining in the game to win 42–35. In 2006, the Aggies allowed the Sooners to escape with a one-point victory. Then-head coach Dennis Franchione elected to go for a field goal rather than score a touchdown from the 2-yard line with 3:28 left in the game. Oklahoma was predicted to win by 27.5 points.

The Aggies suffered their worst home loss in school history.

=== Baylor ===
	1	2	3	4	Total
Texas A&M	0	7	0	14	21
Baylor	3	17	21	0	41

The Aggies came into the 2008 Battle of the Brazos as 8-point underdogs but leading in the series 65–30–9. A&M had held a 13-game winning streak against Baylor until 2004, when the Bears upset a #16-ranked Aggie team in Waco. Art Briles took over as the Bears' new head coach in the offseason, replacing Guy Morriss. The Bears freshman phenom quarterback Robert Griffin carved up the Aggies for 56 yards rushing on 12 carries to go along with 13 of 23 passing for 241 yards, two touchdowns and no interceptions. Baylor tailback Jay Finley rushed for 115 yards. The Aggies turned the ball over five times, four of which were interceptions of Aggie sophomore quarterback Jerrod Johnson. The Aggies scored two touchdowns late in the game to make the final score a more respectable, 41–21. First-year coach Mike Sherman summed up the game saying, "Each (loss) has been more disappointing than the next. I take nothing away from Baylor, but we fully expected to come in and play better than we did. Before the Oklahoma game, I thought we were making progress. The culmination of last week and this week are very disappointing."

=== Texas ===
	1	2	3	4	Total
Texas A&M	0	3	0	6	9
#2 Texas	7	14	7	21	49

This game marked the 115th meeting between Texas and Texas A&M and it was the fifth year as part of a multi-sport rivalry called the Lone Star Showdown. The football rivalry began in 1894 and it was the longest-running rivalry for both the Longhorns and Aggies and it is also was the third most-played rivalry in Division I-A college football. Texas entered into the 2007 contest with a 73–35–5 record. Since the series began in 1900, the game has traditionally been played on Thanksgiving Day or Thanksgiving weekend. The 2007 game marked the twelfth straight game to be scheduled the day after Thanksgiving. The two schools had agreed to move the game back to Thanksgiving Day for the 2008 and 2009 contests.
