= Trayveon Williams =

American football player (born 1997)

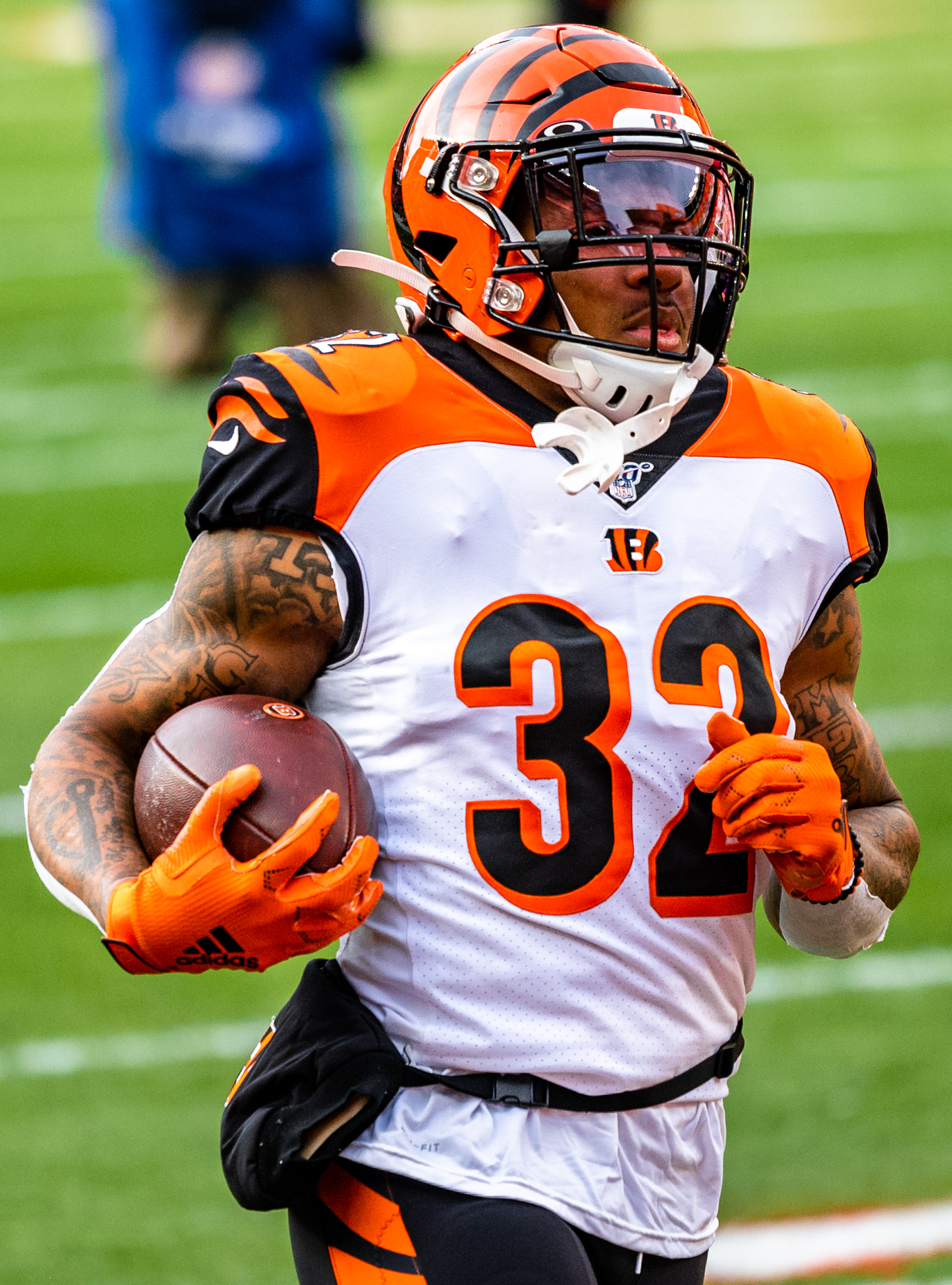
- Williams with the Cincinnati Bengals in 2019

Profile
- Positions: Running back, return specialist

Personal information
- Born: October 18, 1997 (age 29); Houston, Texas, U.S.
- Listed height: 5 ft 8 in (1.73 m)
- Listed weight: 206 lb (93 kg)

Career information
- High school: C.E. King (Houston)
- College: Texas A&M (2016–2018)
- NFL draft: 2019: 6th round, 182nd overall pick

Career history
- Cincinnati Bengals (2019–2024); New England Patriots (2025)*; Cleveland Browns (2025)*; Los Angeles Chargers (2025); Cleveland Browns (2025); Detroit Lions (2026)*
- * Offseason or practice squad member only

Awards and highlights
- Second-team All-American (2018); First-team All-SEC (2018)

Career NFL statistics as of Week 13, 2025
- Rushing yards: 306
- Rushing average: 4.7
- Receptions: 16
- Receiving yards: 74
- Return yards: 816
- Stats at Pro Football Reference

Trayveon Thomas Williams (born October 18, 1997) is an American professional football running back and return specialist. During his junior season at Texas A&M, Williams received first team all-SEC and second-team All-American honors; he also broke the school records for single-season all-purpose yards and rushing yards. Williams was selected by the Cincinnati Bengals in the sixth round of the 2019 NFL draft.

== College career ==
=== Freshman season ===
In his collegiate debut in the season opener against UCLA, Williams had 94 rushing yards. After gaining 127 yards against Auburn, including an 89-yard rushing touchdown, Williams was named the Southeastern Conference (SEC) Freshman of the Week. In the next game, against Arkansas, he had 153 rushing yards and two rushing touchdowns. On October 8, against Tennessee, he had a season-high 217 rushing yards and a rushing touchdown in the 45–38 double overtime victory. Williams became the first true freshman in school history to rush for 1,000 yards in a season.

=== Sophomore season ===
Williams rushed for 203 yards against UCLA in the season-opening loss. Overall, he compiled 798 total rushing yards as a sophomore.

=== Junior season ===
Prior to the season, Williams was selected to the second team All-SEC preseason team. He rushed for 240 yards in season opener against Northwestern State, second highest single-game in school history. He was named one of ten semifinalists for the Doak Walker Award. Following the regular season, Williams received first-team all-SEC honors from the league's coaches and the Associated Press (AP), and second-team All-American honors from the AP, Athlon Sports, and Sporting News.

During the 2018 Gator Bowl, Williams broke the school records for single-season all-purpose yards and single-season rushing yards, and the Gator Bowl record for single-game rushing yards. The school record for single-season all-purpose yards was previously set by Cyrus Gray in 2010, while the single-season rushing yards record was set by Darren Lewis in 1988. Former Syracuse running back Floyd Little set the Gator Bowl record in 1966. On January 3, 2019, Williams announced that he would forgo his final year of eligibility and declare for the 2019 NFL draft.

=== Collegiate statistics ===
Year	School	Conf	Class	Pos	G	Rushing				Receiving			
Year	School	Conf	Class	Pos	G	Att	Yds	Avg	TD	Rec	Yds	Avg	TD
2016	Texas A&M	SEC	FR	RB	13	156	1,057	6.8	8	19	91	4.8	0
2017	Texas A&M	SEC	SO	RB	12	173	798	4.6	8	20	192	9.6	0
2018	Texas A&M	SEC	JR	RB	13	271	1,760	6.5	18	27	278	10.3	1
Career	Texas A&M				28	600	3,615	6.0	34	66	561	8.5	1

== Professional career ==
Pre-draft measurables
Height	Weight	Arm length	Hand span	Wingspan	40-yard dash	10-yard split	20-yard split	20-yard shuttle	Three-cone drill	Vertical jump	Broad jump	Bench press
5 ft 8 1/8 in (1.73 m)	206 lb (93 kg)	30 3/8 in (0.77 m)	9 1/4 in (0.23 m)	6 ft 2 1/8 in (1.88 m)	4.51 s	1.55 s	2.63 s	4.44 s	7.44 s	33.0 in (0.84 m)	10 ft 1 in (3.07 m)	19 reps
All values from NFL Combine

=== Cincinnati Bengals ===
==== 2019–2020 ====
Williams was selected by the Cincinnati Bengals in the sixth round, 182nd overall, of the 2019 NFL draft. He appeared in 11 games as a rookie in mainly a special teams role. He had 26 carries for 157 rushing yards in ten games in the 2020 season.

==== 2021 ====
On August 31, 2021, Williams was waived by the Bengals and re-signed to the practice squad the next day. He was promoted to the active roster on December 4. He had five appearances in the 2021 season in a reserve and special teams role.

==== 2022 ====
Williams was cut by the Bengals on August 30, 2022., but was re-signed on September 1.

Williams began the 2022 season as the fourth running back on the depth chart, behind Joe Mixon, Samaje Perine, and Chris Evans, and was a weekly healthy inactive, but starting Week 11 against the Pittsburgh Steelers, Williams replaced Evans as the team's kickoff returner. He appeared in eight games, and finished the year with 356 return yards, and 30 rushing yards on 6 attempts. Williams continued to return kicks for the team during their 2022 playoff games.

==== 2023 ====
On March 16, 2023, Williams re-signed with the Bengals on a one-year contract. During the first day of training camp in full pads on August 1, Williams went down with an ankle injury and was carted off the practice field. He was named the second running back on the depth chart for the season, only behind Mixon. Williams once again replaced Evans as the team's kick returner for the second year in a row. Following the rise of rookie Chase Brown, Williams lost both the job of kick returns and change-of-pace back.

==== 2024 ====
On March 11, 2024, Williams signed a one-year contract extension with the Bengals. He was named the third running back on the depth chart to begin the season, behind Zack Moss and Brown. Williams lost his role as the Bengals' kick returner to Charlie Jones starting with the Week 5 game against the Baltimore Ravens. He did not log a single carry or catch for the entire 2024 season, being used in a solely special teams capacity.

=== New England Patriots ===
On May 14, 2025, Williams signed with the New England Patriots. He was released by the Patriots on July 30.

=== Cleveland Browns ===
On August 4, 2025, Williams signed with the Cleveland Browns. He was released by Cleveland on August 26 as a part of final roster cuts and was re-signed to the team's practice squad the next day. Williams was released by the Browns on September 9.

=== Los Angeles Chargers ===
On October 21, 2025, Williams signed with the Los Angeles Chargers' practice squad.

=== Cleveland Browns (second stint) ===
On December 10, 2025, Williams was signed by the Cleveland Browns off of the Chargers' practice squad.

=== Detroit Lions ===
On August 16, 2026, Williams signed with the Detroit Lions. On August 30, he was released by the Lions as a part of final roster cuts.
