= Mike Goodson =

American football player (born 1987)

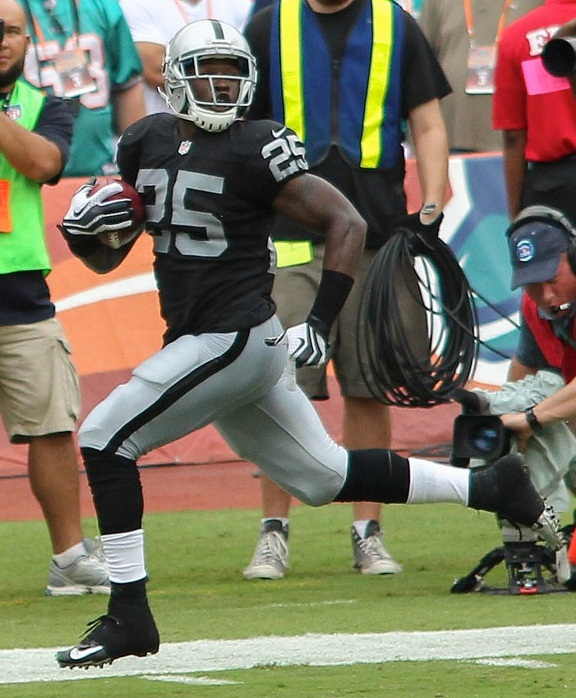
- Goodson with the Oakland Raiders in 2012

No. 33, 25, 23
- Positions: Running back, kickoff returner

Personal information
- Born: May 23, 1987 (age 39); Irvington, New Jersey, U.S.
- Listed height: 6 ft 0 in (1.83 m)
- Listed weight: 210 lb (95 kg)

Career information
- High school: Klein Collins (Spring, Texas)
- College: Texas A&M
- NFL draft: 2009: 4th round, 111th overall pick

Career history
- Carolina Panthers (2009–2011); Oakland Raiders (2012); New York Jets (2013)

Career NFL statistics
- Rushing attempts: 167
- Rushing yards: 783
- Receptions: 61
- Receiving yards: 543
- Return yards: 2,009
- Total touchdowns: 4
- Stats at Pro Football Reference

Michael Darryl Goodson Jr. (born May 23, 1987) is an American former professional football player who was a running back in the National Football League (NFL). He played college football for the Texas A&M Aggies. Goodson was selected by the Carolina Panthers in the fourth round of the 2009 NFL draft. He also played for the Oakland Raiders and the New York Jets.

== Early life ==
Goodson attended Westfield High School in Houston previously before he attended Klein Collins High School in Spring, Texas, where he played football and ran track. During his junior year, Goodson ran for 1,152 yards on 101 carries, averaging 11.5 yards per carry with 14 touchdowns, and had 11 receptions for 277 yards and five touchdowns. His senior year, Goodson had 973 yards rushing on 99 carries. He was invited to play in the 2006 U.S. Army All-American Bowl.

In track and field, Goodson posted personal-bests of 21.92 seconds in the 200-meter dash, 6.40 meters (20 ft, 9 in) in the long jump and 42.91 seconds in the 4 × 100 m.

=== Recruiting ===
During his college recruiting process, Goodson initially committed verbally to play for Oklahoma State in July 2005, but he decommitted in December. At that time, he decided he would go to either USC or Texas A&M. In late January 2006, he committed to Texas A&M and eventually signed a National Letter of Intent.

== College career ==
=== 2006 season ===
Goodson had problems protecting the football early in the season, fumbling twice in the Aggies opener against The Citadel (Military College). As a consequence his carries were limited until the game against the Missouri Tigers where he had 15 carries.

Goodson was named Big 12 Freshman of the Year and earned honorable mention All-Big 12 Honors. He rushed for 847 yards and four touchdowns averaging a conference high 6.7 yards per carry and also caught 17 passes for 113 yards. He had a career-high 127 yards against Oklahoma and scored a critical 41-yard touchdown against the Texas Longhorns, who had the nation's leading rush defense.

=== 2007 season ===
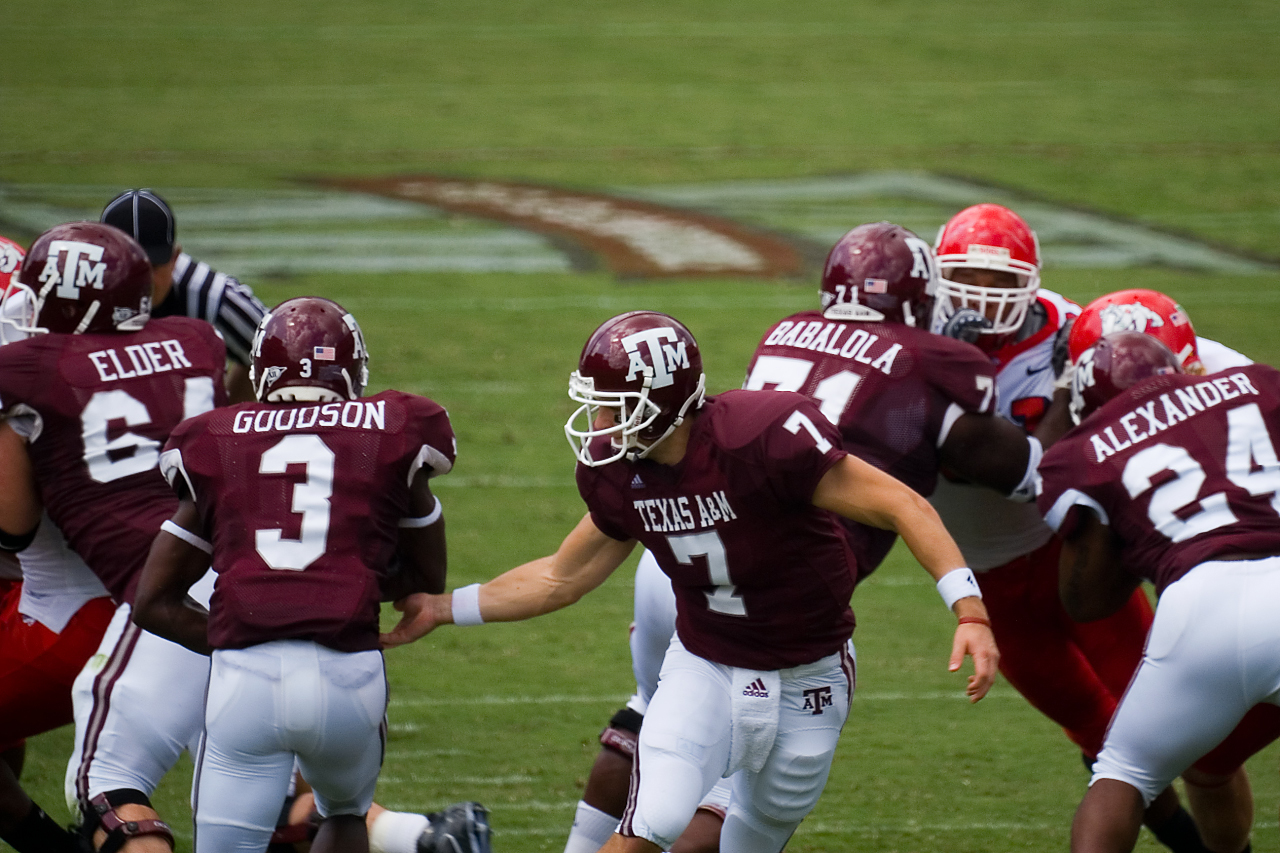
Goodson receiving a handoff from quarterback Stephen McGee in 2007

Goodson once again split carries with Jorvorskie Lane. Goodson bulked up for the season, weighing in at 206 lbs (previously 192), but claimed the gain did not affect his speed. Goodson's stated that his goal for the season was 1,300 yards rushing. At the end of the season, however, he rushed for 711 yards on 153 carries. The team finished 7–6, including a loss in the Alamo Bowl.

=== 2008 season ===
In the offseason, Goodson gained 20 pounds of muscle. He looked to play a greater role in the 2008 season as former tailback Jorvorskie Lane was converted to fullback by new head coach Mike Sherman. Goodson finished the season with 406 rushing yards in 10 games. He also made 37 receptions for 386 yards.

=== Awards and honors ===
- 2006 All-Big 12 Honorable Mention
- 2007 All-Big 12 Preseason Team

== Professional career ==
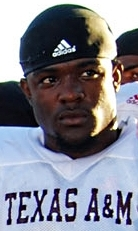
Goodson during his tenure at Texas A&M.

=== 2009 NFL draft ===
Pre-draft measurables
Height	Weight	Arm length	Hand span	40-yard dash	10-yard split	20-yard split	20-yard shuttle	Three-cone drill	Vertical jump	Broad jump	Bench press
5 ft 11 7/8 in (1.83 m)	208 lb (94 kg)	32 1/4 in (0.82 m)	9 7/8 in (0.25 m)	4.43 s	1.53 s	2.54 s	4.22 s	6.89 s	39.5 in (1.00 m)	9 ft 10 in (3.00 m)	14 reps

At the 2009 NFL Combine, Goodson ran 4.54 seconds in the 40-yard dash, ranking 7th among all running backs. He weighed 212 pounds and measured 5-foot-11 and 3/4 at the Texas A&M Pro Day on March 4, 2009.

In the 2009 NFL draft, he was picked by the Carolina Panthers in the fourth round (111th overall). He signed a four-year deal with the Panthers on June 27, 2009.

=== Carolina Panthers ===
During a 2009 preseason game against the New York Giants, Goodson made a throat slash gesture towards the crowd after scoring a touchdown. He was immediately flagged, and was later fined $7,500. As a rookie, he weighed 190 pounds.

Goodson was active in 8 games, mostly serving backup duty. Goodson had his best week of the season in week 17, rushing 13 times for 44 yards filling in for an injured DeAngelo Williams.

During a 2010 preseason victory against the Tennessee Titans, Goodson returned a kickoff 91 yards for a touchdown, the first time a Panther did such since DeAngelo Williams did it during the 2006 preseason against the Miami Dolphins.

Goodson had an increased role in the regular season. For most of the year, he served as kickoff returner as well as a third-down/situational back. After a season-ending injury to starting back DeAngelo Williams in week 7, however, Goodson was featured more extensively, and was given a more heavy rotation with Jonathan Stewart.

Goodson eventually started in weeks 10–12 after an injury to Stewart, racking up 390 offensive yards in the starts. After Stewart's return in week 13, however, Goodson received much less playing time at running back.

Goodson finished the year with 452 yards and three touchdowns on the ground, and an additional 310 yards on 40 catches; he also recorded 1,034 yards on kickoff returns. Goodson finished second on the team in both rushing yards and receptions, but led the team in rushing touchdowns.

=== Oakland Raiders ===
Goodson was traded to the Oakland Raiders on March 30, 2012, in exchange for tackle Bruce Campbell.

=== New York Jets ===
The New York Jets signed Goodson to a three-year contract on March 15, 2013. On August 26, 2013, Goodson was suspended for four games for violating the NFL's PED policy. He was promoted to the active roster on October 5, 2013. He suffered a season-ending knee injury on October 13, 2013 against the Pittsburgh Steelers, tearing his ACL and MCL. He was placed on the injured reserve list two days later. Goodson was released by the team on June 18, 2014 after he failed to attend mandatory mini-camp.

== Personal life ==
His brother, Demetri Goodson, played college football at Baylor and is now with the Green Bay Packers. His brother, Jakar Hamilton used to play for the Dallas Cowboys. Goodson Sr. played college basketball at Pitt.

On May 17, 2013, Goodson was arrested in New Jersey as a passenger in a vehicle and charged with possession of marijuana, possession of drug paraphernalia, unlawful possession of a weapon, possession of a loaded gun and possession of hollow point round. He was taken to St. Claire's hospital due to his condition at the time of arrest. After leaving the hospital, he was taken to the state police to be processed. Goodson's bail was set at $50,000.

== Career statistics ==
Year	Team	GP	GS	Rushing					Receiving				Kickoff Returns					Fumbles	
Year	Team	GP	GS	Att	Yds	Avg	Lng	TD	Rec	Yds	Lng	TD	Ret	Yds	Avg	Lng	TD	Fum	Lost
2009	CAR	8	0	22	49	2.2	11	0	2	15	13	0	17	352	20.7	46	0	1	1
2010	CAR	16	3	103	452	4.4	45	3	40	310	32	0	48	1,048	21.8	46	0	6	3
2011	CAR	4	0	--	--	--	--	--	1	4	4	0	11	250	22.7	31	0	0	0
2012	OAK	12	0	35	221	6.3	43	0	16	195	64	1	16	359	22.4	51	0	0	0
Total		40	3	160	722	4.3	45	3	59	524	64	1	92	2,009	21.7	51	0	7	4
