= Kevin Murray (American football) =

American football player (born 1964)

No. 14
- Position: Quarterback

Personal information
- Born: June 18, 1964 (age 62); Dallas, Texas, U.S.
- Listed height: 6 ft 1 in (1.85 m)

Career information
- College: Texas A&M
- NFL draft: 1987: undrafted

Career history
- San Francisco 49ers (1987)*; Calgary Stampeders (1988)
- * Offseason or practice squad member only

Awards and highlights
- Third-team All-American (1986); SWC Offensive Player of the Year (1986); First-team All-SWC (1986); Second-team All-SWC (1983)

Kevin Murray (born June 18, 1964) is an American former football quarterback at Texas A&M University and is currently a high school football coach. Murray's younger brother is former Major League Baseball (MLB) outfielder Calvin Murray. His son, Kyler, won the Heisman Trophy and was selected first overall in the 2019 NFL draft by the Arizona Cardinals.

== Early life ==
He was an All-State quarterback at North Dallas High School and was named Dallas-Ft. Worth metroplex Offensive Player of the Year his senior season. He was also a center fielder for the North Dallas baseball team. Murray was drafted by the Milwaukee Brewers in the 11th Round (287th overall) of 1982 MLB draft and played one season ('82) for their Pikeville rookie league team in the Appalachian League before enrolling at Texas A&M.

== College career ==
Murray arrived at Texas A&M in the fall of 1983. Against Arkansas, he threw three touchdown passes in a six-minute span and finished the game off with a late fourth-quarter touchdown toss to set a freshman school record with four touchdowns in a game. By the end of the season, he had been named the Southwest Conference Newcomer of the Year as well as second-team all-conference. He finished the year as the SWC's total offense leader, averaging 165 yds per game and was the conference leader with 14 touchdown passes. On the season, he passed for 1,544 yds and 14 touchdowns with a 53% completion rate. In 1984, in the third game of his sophomore year, Murray shattered his ankle diving for a first down in a game against Arkansas State. The injury would require surgery and a year of rehabilitation.

In 1985, Texas A&M appealed to the NCAA and received a medical hardship exemption, making 1984 a redshirt year for Murray and granting him an additional year of eligibility. Murray had an outstanding 1985 season, passing for 2,463 yards then an A&M record. A&M beat SMU, Arkansas, and Texas in three late-season home games that were all televised by ESPN. The Aggies' 42-10 whipping of Texas to return to the Cotton Bowl Classic for the first time since 1968 made Murray a household name.

For his efforts, he earned second team All-American honors from the Football News and Offensive MVP honors in the Aggies' 1986 Cotton Bowl Classic victory over Auburn and Heisman Trophy winner Bo Jackson. In the game, Murray passed for 292 yards, breaking Joe Montana's Cotton Bowl Classic record and leading the Aggies to a 36–16 win. After the season, Murray was named Offensive Player of the Year by the Associated Press, The Dallas Morning News and Houston Chronicle.

Murray had a spectacular 1986 season, one in which he broke most of Texas A&M's passing records and became the Southwest Conference's all-time touchdown leader. He was once again named a 2nd team All-American and led the Aggies to their second consecutive top-10 finish. One of Murray's career highlights came during the 1986 Baylor game at Kyle Field, in which he rallied the Aggies from a 17–0 deficit to a 31–30 victory, completing 25-of-40 passes for 308 yards and three touchdowns and rushing for another. The game was voted the decade's best by Texas Football magazine

The Aggies returned to the Cotton Bowl Classic that year to face Ohio State, but Murray's return appearance was not as successful. In what would be his final game at A&M, Murray threw five interceptions while completing only 12 of 31 passes as the Aggies ended a great season with a frustrating defeat. He finished his Aggie career 25-6-1 as a starter, making him the winningest quarterback in Aggie history (his career wins record was later broken by Corey Pullig).

== Post-career awards ==
In 1999, Murray was named to the Texas A&M Athletic Hall of Fame.

In 2012, Murray was inducted into the AT&T Cotton Bowl Classic Hall of Fame. Fellow 2012 AT&T Cotton Bowl Classic Hall of Fame inductees included Texas linebacker/defensive back Tom Campbell, Notre Dame head coach Lou Holtz, BYU middle linebacker Shay Muirbrook, and Arkansas defensive lineman Jim Williams.

== Professional career ==
Murray made himself eligible for the NFL draft after his junior year, but went undrafted. Although one of the nation's top orthopedic specialists cleared Murray to play in the NFL, concerns about his health and lingering issues with his ankle kept teams away. Murray had two brief professional stints, signing as a free-agent with the San Francisco 49ers and the Calgary Stampeders, but eventually retired due to the chronic ankle injury that had plagued him since his early days at Texas A&M.

== Coaching ==
Murray was serving as the high school quarterback coach at Parish Episcopal School and runs the Air 14 Quarterback Academy as of 2013.

== Personal life ==
Murray is married to Missy Murray. His son Kyler played quarterback in his father's footsteps at Texas A&M before transferring to the University of Oklahoma, where he won the Heisman Trophy in 2018. Kyler went on to become the first-overall pick in the 2019 NFL draft by the Arizona Cardinals.
