= Jerrod Johnson =

American football player and coach (born 1988)

Philadelphia Eagles
- Title: Senior offensive analyst

Personal information
- Born: July 27, 1988 (age 38); Houston, Texas, U.S.
- Listed height: 6 ft 5 in (1.96 m)
- Listed weight: 251 lb (114 kg)

Career information
- Position: Quarterback
- College: Texas A&M (2006–2010)
- NFL draft: 2011: undrafted

Career history

Playing
- Hartford Colonials (2011)*; Philadelphia Eagles (2011)*; Arizona Rattlers (2012)*; Pittsburgh Steelers (2012)*; Sacramento Mountain Lions (2012); Seattle Seahawks (2013)*; Chicago Bears (2013–2014)*; Montreal Alouettes (2014)*; Baltimore Ravens (2016)*; Dallas Cowboys (2016)*; YCF Grit (2018)
- * Offseason or practice squad member only

Coaching
- San Francisco 49ers (2017) Bill Walsh Diversity coaching fellowship; Indianapolis Colts (2019) Bill Walsh Diversity coaching fellowship; Indianapolis Colts (2020–2021) Offensive quality control coach; Minnesota Vikings (2022) Assistant quarterbacks coach; Houston Texans (2023–2025) Quarterbacks coach; Philadelphia Eagles (2026–present) Senior offensive analyst

Awards and highlights
- As a player: Second-team All-Big 12 (2009); Big 12 record for throwing 242 consecutive passes without an interception
- Stats at Pro Football Reference

Jerrod Terrel Johnson (born July 27, 1988) is an American professional football coach and former player of the National Football League (NFL). He played quarterback at Texas A&M. Johnson was Texas A&M's starting quarterback from 2008 to 2010, finishing his collegiate career ranked first in school history with 8,011 passing yards and 8,888 yards total offense. He is currently second in school history in passing yards (behind Kellen Mond) and third in total offense (behind Johnny Manziel and Kellen Mond). Johnson was signed by the Philadelphia Eagles as an undrafted free agent in 2011 and would play in the NFL for six seasons with the Eagles, Pittsburgh Steelers, Seattle Seahawks, Chicago Bears, Baltimore Ravens and Dallas Cowboys. Johnson's coaching career began in 2017; he held various assistant coaching roles on the San Francisco 49ers, Indianapolis Colts, Minnesota Vikings and Houston Texans.

== Playing career ==
=== College ===
==== 2006 season ====
Johnson saw no action during the 2006 football season as he was redshirted.

He was also on the Aggie basketball team for a while during the 2006–07 basketball season, playing minor minutes under coach Billy Gillispie in three games against Big 12 opponents, recording just a single assist and no points or rebounds. He chose to focus on football after the season.

==== 2007 season ====
During the 2007 football season Johnson backed up junior Stephen McGee at quarterback. He took 20 snaps the entire season, and 13 of those 20 were running plays. He compiled 161 all-purpose yards for five touchdowns.

==== 2008 season ====
Prior to Johnson's sophomore season, head coach Mike Sherman became the Aggies' new coach. During fall camp Johnson competed for the starting job with senior Stephen McGee, but lost out to the veteran team leader. Johnson was then moved to part-time receiver. He made his first catch vs Arkansas State for a gain of 36 yards. His role as a wide receiver continued for only a brief period. In the second game of the season, vs New Mexico, Stephen McGee suffered a right shoulder sprain on the opening series. Johnson stepped in and completed 10-of-19 for 124 yards and 3 touchdowns. He returned to the wide receiver position against Army, but McGee re-injured his shoulder during the game, paving the way for Johnson to step in and lead Texas A&M to a victory. Against Kansas State, Johnson compiled 419 passing yards and 487 total offensive yards, setting then-single game school records in both categories. He threw for 381 yards and a career-best four touchdown passes against Iowa State. Johnson threw for a career-high of 4 interceptions against Baylor.

==== 2009 season ====
Johnson and Ryan Tannehill battled for the starting position during the 2009 offseason, but Johnson eventually prevailed. Johnson led the team to a 6–6 regular-season record including an upset road win at Texas Tech. He compiled a school-record 3,217 passing yards in the regular season, and also led the Big 12 in touchdown passes for the season. In the 2009 Independence Bowl against Georgia, he completed 29 of 58 passes for 362 yards and two touchdowns, but was sacked three times and intercepted twice in the loss. He was named Second-team All-Big 12 for his performance during the 2009 regular season.

==== 2010 season ====
In the spring prior to his 2010 season, Johnson had arthroscopic shoulder surgery.

He entered the 2010 season as the Preseason Big 12 Offensive Player of the Year and a dark horse Heisman Trophy candidate. However, he failed to meet the high expectations. He threw nine interceptions in the first five games of the season, and then struggled in the 30–9 loss to Missouri. A sports editor noted that Johnson struggled with his accuracy and seemed to have less of a "zip" on his passes. During the ensuing Kansas game, he split time at quarterback with second-string Ryan Tannehill. Tannehill outperformed Johnson with his 12-for-16 passes for 155 yards and three touchdowns. Johnson lost the starting job to Tannehill after the Kansas game.

Over the first seven games, Johnson posted 158-of-279 passes for 14 touchdowns and nine interceptions. His passing efficiency rating was 125.4. He was also sacked 25 times on 304 plays. However, during the Kansas game, he raised his total career yardage to 8,888, breaking the school record of 8,876 held by Reggie McNeal from 2002 to 2005. He is the A&M career leader in both total offense (8,888 yards) and passing yards (8,011 yards).

=== College statistics ===
Season	Team	GP	Passing							Rushing			Receiving		
Season	Team	GP	Cmp	Att	Pct	Yds	TD	Int	Rtg	Att	Yds	TD	Rec	Yds	TD
2007	Texas A&M	5	2	7	28.6	50	2	0	182.9	13	111	3	0	0	0
2008	Texas A&M	11	194	326	59.5	2,435	21	10	137.4	94	114	3	2	41	0
2009	Texas A&M	12	296	497	59.6	3,579	30	8	136.7	145	506	8	0	0	0
2010	Texas A&M	7	158	279	56.6	1,947	14	9	125.3	79	146	2	0	0	0
Total		35	650	1,109	58.6	8,011	67	27	145.6	331	877	16	2	41	0

=== Professional ===
Pre-draft measurables
Height	Weight	Arm length	Hand span	Wingspan	40-yard dash	10-yard split	20-yard split	20-yard shuttle	Three-cone drill	Vertical jump	Broad jump
6 ft 5 1/8 in (1.96 m)	251 lb (114 kg)	34 7/8 in (0.89 m)	9 7/8 in (0.25 m)	6 ft 9 1/8 in (2.06 m)	4.82 s	1.71 s	2.81 s	4.31 s	7.28 s	29.0 in (0.74 m)	9 ft 11 in (3.02 m)
All values from NFL Combine

Johnson played in the 2011 East–West Shrine Game. A sports editor commented that Johnson had the least zip of all the quarterbacks who played, and did not throw like he used to during the 2009 season.

He went undrafted in the 2011 NFL draft.

==== Hartford Colonials ====
Johnson was selected first overall in the 2011 UFL draft by the Hartford Colonials. However, the Colonials went out of business and Johnson became a free agent.

==== Philadelphia Eagles ====
He signed as an undrafted free agent with the Philadelphia Eagles on July 26, 2011. He was waived on August 13.

==== Arizona Rattlers ====
On September 27, 2011, he was assigned to the Arizona Rattlers of the Arena Football League (AFL) for the 2012 AFL season.

==== Pittsburgh Steelers ====
The Pittsburgh Steelers signed Johnson on January 13, 2012. They then cut him on August 31, 2012.

==== Sacramento Mountain Lions ====
Johnson signed with the Sacramento Mountain Lions of the UFL in September 2012, serving as the team's backup quarterback. He became the team's starter in Week 2 of the 2012 season after an injury to starter Josh Johnson.

==== Seattle Seahawks ====
The Seattle Seahawks signed Johnson on April 24, 2013. He was released on June 14, after the Seahawks signed Tarvaris Jackson who had just been released by the Buffalo Bills.

==== Chicago Bears ====
On September 1, 2013, Johnson was signed by the Chicago Bears to the practice squad. He was released on September 4, 2013, and was brought back on September 9. He was again removed from the practice squad on September 24.

Johnson signed a reserve/future contract with the Bears on December 30, 2013. He was waived on June 20, 2014.

==== Montreal Alouettes ====
On September 16, 2014, Johnson was signed to the practice roster of the Montreal Alouettes.

==== Baltimore Ravens ====
Johnson signed a reserve/future contract with the Baltimore Ravens January 5, 2016. On August 29, 2016, he was waived by the Ravens.

==== Dallas Cowboys ====
Johnson was signed by the Dallas Cowboys on September 1, 2016. On September 3, 2016, he was released by the Cowboys.

== Coaching career ==
=== San Francisco 49ers ===
In 2017, Johnson joined the San Francisco 49ers under the Bill Walsh Diversity Coaching Fellowship under head coach Kyle Shanahan.

=== Indianapolis Colts ===
In 2019, Johnson joined the Indianapolis Colts under the Bill Walsh Diversity Coaching Fellowship. On February 17, 2020, Johnson was promoted to offensive quality control coach under head coach Frank Reich.

=== Minnesota Vikings ===
In 2022, Johnson was hired by the Minnesota Vikings as their assistant quarterbacks coach under head coach Kevin O'Connell.

=== Houston Texans ===
On February 12, 2023, Johnson was hired by the Houston Texans as their quarterbacks coach under head coach DeMeco Ryans, who Johnson had previously worked with in San Francisco. Johnson was part of the staff that led the Texans to a 10–7 regular season finish, the AFC South title, and a Wild Card Round victory over the Cleveland Browns and Johnson helped guide and develop rookie quarterback C. J. Stroud in 2023, who went on to win NFL Rookie of the Year.

On February 26, 2026, it was announced that Johnson and the Texans would be parting ways.

=== Philadelphia Eagles ===
On March 1, 2026, the Philadelphia Eagles added Johnson to their coaching staff in an unspecified role.

== Personal life ==
Jerrod has one brother named Marquis. Their father, Larry Johnson, who also played for the Aggies, died of a stroke in December 2007. Jerrod married his wife Braidee Ireland in May 2021.
