= Jorvorskie Lane =

American football player (born 1987)

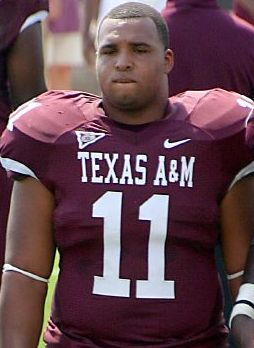
- Lane with the Texas A&M Aggies at Kyle Field in 2006

No. 41, 46
- Position: Fullback

Personal information
- Born: February 4, 1987 (age 39); Lufkin, Texas, U.S.
- Listed height: 5 ft 11 in (1.80 m)
- Listed weight: 258 lb (117 kg)

Career information
- High school: Lufkin (TX)
- College: Texas A&M
- NFL draft: 2009: undrafted

Career history
- West Texas Roughnecks (2010); Orlando Predators (2011); Miami Dolphins (2012); Tampa Bay Buccaneers (2014–2015)

Awards and highlights
- Second-team All-Big 12 (2006)

Career NFL statistics
- Rushing attempts: 17
- Rushing yards: 71
- Rushing touchdowns: 2
- Receptions: 14
- Receiving yards: 95
- Receiving touchdowns: 1
- Stats at Pro Football Reference

Jorvorskie Javion Lane (born February 4, 1987) is an American former professional football player who was a fullback in the National Football League (NFL) for the Miami Dolphins and Tampa Bay Buccaneers. He played college football at Texas A&M; he played tailback during his freshman through junior seasons, and switched to fullback his senior season. He holds the school record for career rushing touchdowns (49). He also played professionally for the West Texas Roughnecks of the Indoor Football League and the Orlando Predators of the Arena Football League.

== Early life ==
Jorvorskie Lane was born four weeks premature in Lufkin, Texas, where he was raised by his grandparents. At birth, he weighed four pounds and was hospitalized for the first fourteen days of his life as his organs were underdeveloped. In junior high, Lane weighed 125 pounds, and aspired to become the next Michael Jordan, prior to his weight gain. As a freshman at Lufkin High School, he weighed 248 pounds. Despite his heavy weight, he was very athletic during high school. As a three-year starter at running back, he rushed for 3,671 yards and 70 touchdowns, and recorded 82 receptions for 1,060 yards. His high school coach once stated that Lane was the "best guy he's ever coached" and that he could have "started at every position on either side of the football". Lane was a teammate of wide receiver Dez Bryant and was on the passing end of Bryant's first touchdown in high school. Lane also played basketball in high school, in which he averaged 16 points per game and earned an all-district pick.

Lane was a two-time all-state selection in high school, and was recruited by eight schools. He later signed a letter of intent with Texas A&M.

== College career ==
=== Freshman year ===
During the 2005 season, Lane played in 10 of the 11 games. He rushed for more than 100 yards twice, including his season-best of 139 yards on 22 carries against Oklahoma State. Overall, Lane rushed for 595 yards and nine touchdowns on 119 carries. His 595 yards were the No. 8 effort by a freshman in A&M history, and his nine rushing touchdowns were the No. 4 freshman effort in school history.

=== Sophomore year ===
During his sophomore year, Lane set many records. In the Louisiana-Lafayette game, Lane scored a career-high of four touchdowns. In the Missouri game, he ran 127 yards on 27 carries—the greatest number of yards he ran for the whole season. He produced a first down or touchdown on 26 out of 29 carries on third and fourth down carries. He scored at least one touchdown in the first 11 games of the season. Overall, he rushed for 725 yards on 166 carries and tied Joel Hunt’s 79 year-old school single-season record with 19 rushing touchdowns.

=== Junior year ===
Prior to the 2007 season, Lane slimmed down to 268 pounds, compared to the 282 pounds he weighed at the end of the 2006 season. The team finished the season with a 7–5 record. Over those 7 wins, Jorvorskie scored 15 total touchdowns, and compiled at least 100 rushing yards three times. Over the 5 losses, he averaged only 31 total yards and scored twice. He rushed for 780 yards on 168 carries, compiling 4.6 yards per touch.

=== Senior year ===
Once new head coach Mike Sherman took over, Lane was moved to fullback. Sherman told Lane of the position change prior to his press conference where he was officially announced as the new A&M coach. Sherman stated: "When I came in, my press conference obviously I met with the team. Jorvorskie was in class during that time. But he came up to me shortly before my press conference, introduced himself, and at that time I told him, you're going to be a fullback. And there was no hemming or hawing about it. He didn't seem totally pleased with it but didn't balk at it necessarily." He also noted that Lane's weight has always been a problem. Sherman had wanted Lane in the 260s once the season starts. In Sherman's offensive system, the fullback catches passes. Lane also needed to block for starting tailback Mike Goodson, especially since the offensive line is inexperienced.

In the first three games of the season, Lane only carried the ball seven times. In the fourth game against Army, A&M coaches used Lane to run out the clock in the final quarter. Lane posted six consecutive carries in the drive, compiling 34 yards. This helped the team escape with a 21–17 victory. After the game, Lane stated "It felt good. That's what I'm going to do when I'm called upon to carry the ball. I'm going to put my team on my back and win."

Lane finished his senior season with just 93 rushing yards and five touchdowns. A Sports Illustrated reporter wrote that this kind of performance "could push" Lane out of the 2009 NFL draft.

Lane had a chance to showcase his abilities for NFL scouts in the 2009 East-West Shrine Game on January 17, 2009. Scouts were discouraged by his weight, which was 295 pounds at the time. During the game, he was unable to carry the ball past defenders inside the 5-yard line three times. Prior to the draft, scouts have stated that Lane could play up to his potential in the NFL if he shows his ability to control his weight. However, he was not drafted in the 2009 NFL draft and was not signed as an undrafted free agent.

Jorvorskie graduated from Texas A&M with a bachelors in Agricultural Leadership in 2025.

=== Statistics ===
Year(s)	Team	Rush	Yds	Yds/G	Avg	TD
2004	Lufkin HS		1,944			36
High school totals			3,671			
2005	Texas A&M	119	595	59.5	5.0	9
2006	Texas A&M	166	725	55.8	4.4	19
2007	Texas A&M	169	780	60.0	4.6	16
2008	Texas A&M	35	93	7.8	2.7	5
College totals*		461	2,090	42.7	4.5	49

*College stats provided by Yahoo! Sports and the NCAA, current as of the completion of the 2008 season.

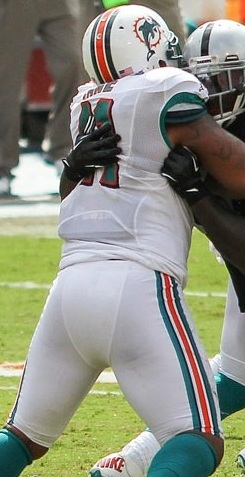
Lane in 2012

== Professional career ==
=== Indoor football ===
Lane signed a letter of intent to play for the West Texas Roughnecks of the Indoor Football League for the 2010 season. In 13 games, Lane compiled 326 all-purpose yards for 12 touchdowns.

Lane participated at the Texas A&M Pro Day in March 2011. He weighed in at 277 pounds and measured 5'11". He recorded a 4.87 40-yard dash, 18 bench reps, 4.41 5-10-5 shuttle, 7.58 L Drill, 32.5 vertical jump, and 8'6" broad jump.

On November 18, 2011, Lane signed with the Orlando Predators of the Arena Football League. In an interview with the AFL, Lane indicated that he had also been training in MMA for a year.

=== Miami Dolphins ===
On June 5, 2012, Lane signed with the Miami Dolphins. He trimmed down to 258 pounds by August 2012. He played in all 16 games, started 5, rushed for 13 yards, 2 touchdowns, 79 receiving yards and one touchdown pass.

On August 27, 2013, Lane was waived by the Dolphins.

=== Tampa Bay Buccaneers ===
After being out of football for a year and a half, Lane signed with the Tampa Bay Buccaneers in April 2014. In October 2014, Lane was suspended for two games for violating the league's performance-enhancing drug policy.

On April 3, 2015, Lane re-signed with the Buccaneers.

== Personal life ==
Lane is the half-brother of Jermichael Finley, who formerly played tight end for the Green Bay Packers.
