= Stephen McGee =

American gridiron football player (born 1985)

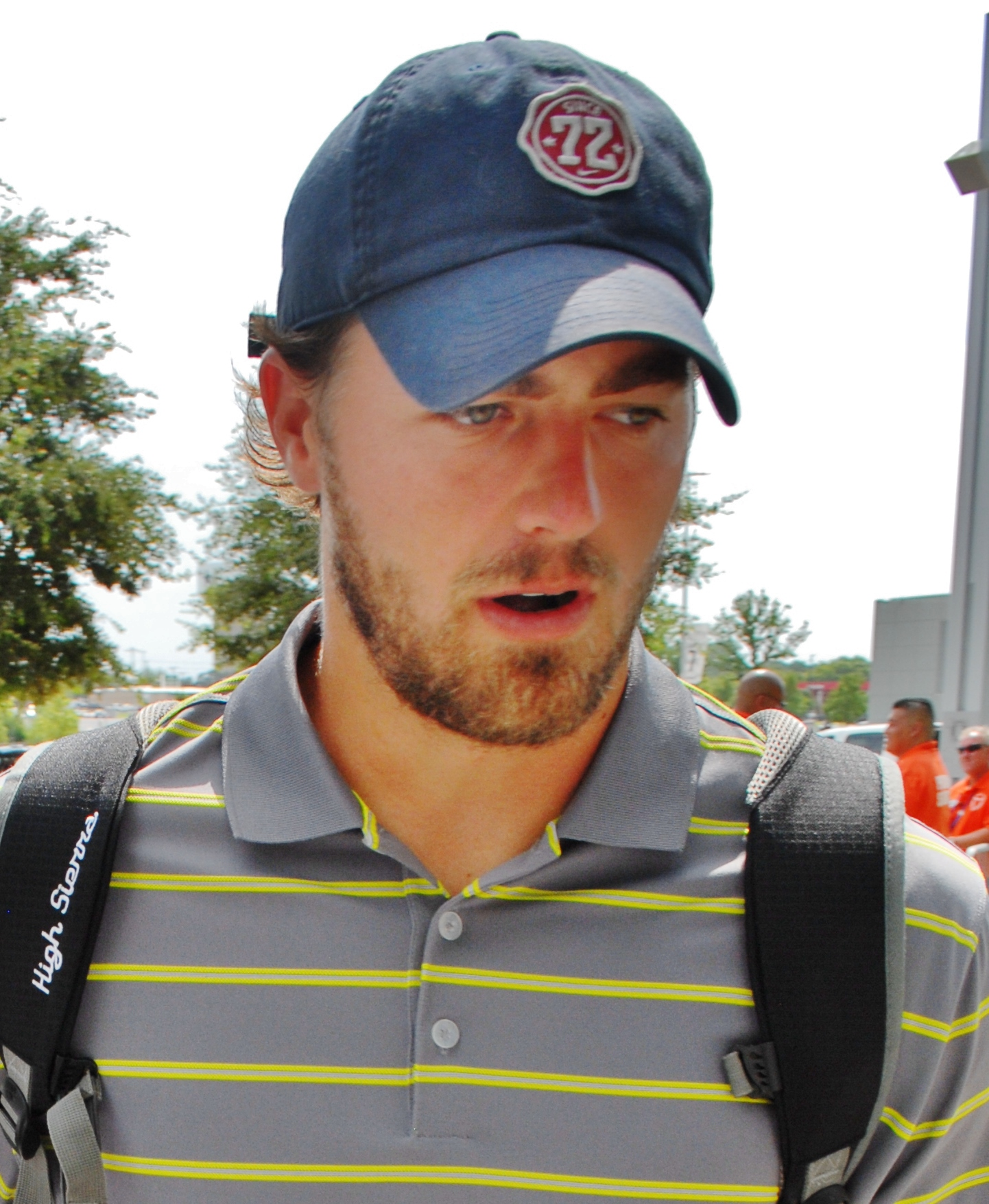
- McGee at Cowboys Stadium in August 2012

No. 7, 6
- Position: Quarterback

Personal information
- Born: September 27, 1985 (age 41); Round Rock, Texas, U.S.
- Listed height: 6 ft 3 in (1.91 m)
- Listed weight: 210 lb (95 kg)

Career information
- High school: Burnet (Burnet, Texas)
- College: Texas A&M
- NFL draft: 2009: 4th round, 101st overall pick

Career history
- Dallas Cowboys (2009–2011); Houston Texans (2013)*; Hamilton Tiger-Cats (2013–2014)
- * Offseason or practice squad member only

Career NFL statistics
- Passing attempts: 82
- Passing completions: 46
- Completion percentage: 56.1%
- TD–INT: 3–0
- Passing yards: 420
- Passer rating: 82.4
- Stats at Pro Football Reference

Stephen Richard McGee (born September 27, 1985) is an American former professional football player who was a quarterback for the Dallas Cowboys of the National Football League (NFL). He played college football for the Texas A&M Aggies. McGee was selected by the Cowboys in the fourth round of the 2009 NFL draft. He also was a member of the Houston Texans of the NFL, and the Hamilton Tiger-Cats of the Canadian Football League (CFL).

== Early life ==
McGee attended Burnet High School. As a sophomore, he was named the starter at quarterback. One of his teammates was future NFL wide receiver Jordan Shipley. He led his team to a 28-2 mark and back-to-back Class 3A state title games in his last 2 years, while being a two-time All-state and a three-time All-district selection.

As a junior, he suffered a torn medial collateral ligament against top-ranked Sinton High School in the first half of the state quarterfinals. The next week, he still played against Jasper High School, helping the team score 35 first-half points.

As a senior, he completed 196 of 313 passes (62.6%) for 3,579 yards, with 47 touchdowns and three interceptions (none in the regular season). He was named the Class 3A Offensive Most Valuable Player. He finished his high-school career with a 36-5 record, 8,256 passing yards, and a 3A state-record 101 passing touchdowns.

In basketball, he received all-district honors as a sophomore, but was not able to play as a junior because of his knee injury. He also competed in track and field, advancing to the regional meet with the 400- and 1,600-meter relays. A straight-A student, McGee was Burnet's best student athlete and graduated 9th in his senior class of over 250 and a semester early.

== College career ==
=== 2005 season ===
After redshirting the 2004 season at Texas A&M University, he made his debut as an Aggie against SMU, compiling 3 of 3 passes for 56 yards in a 66–8 victory. He continued to play as a backup to starter Reggie McNeal in the games against Colorado, Oklahoma State, Texas Tech, and Oklahoma. He took over the starting role for the final two games of the season, due to a sprained ankle injury suffered by McNeal. In those two contests, McGee rushed for 175 yards on 34 carries (5.1 per carry) and completed 9 of 29 passes for 83 yards, while leading the Aggies to 10 scoring opportunities on 19 drives. During the final matchup against Texas, McGee outrushed Texas quarterback Vince Young 108 yards to 19, but the Aggies lost 29–40.

For the season, McGee recorded 24 of 53 passes for 283 yards, two touchdowns, and one interception in eight games. He rushed for 235 yards and two touchdowns on 43 carries (5.5-yard avg.).

=== 2006 season ===
McGee was sidelined most of fall camp with a torn muscle in his throwing arm. He still managed to start all 13 games, leading the team to a 9–4 record. He led the Aggies to a 12-7 victory over rival University of Texas with a rushing touchdown in the fourth quarter. The victory contributed to end the hopes of the Texas team winning back-to-back Big 12 Conference championship and a third consecutive Bowl Championship Series berth.

He set the A&M single-season completion record of 62%, registering 2,295 passing yards, 12 touchdowns, and two interceptions on 194 of 313 attempts, while starting all 13 games.

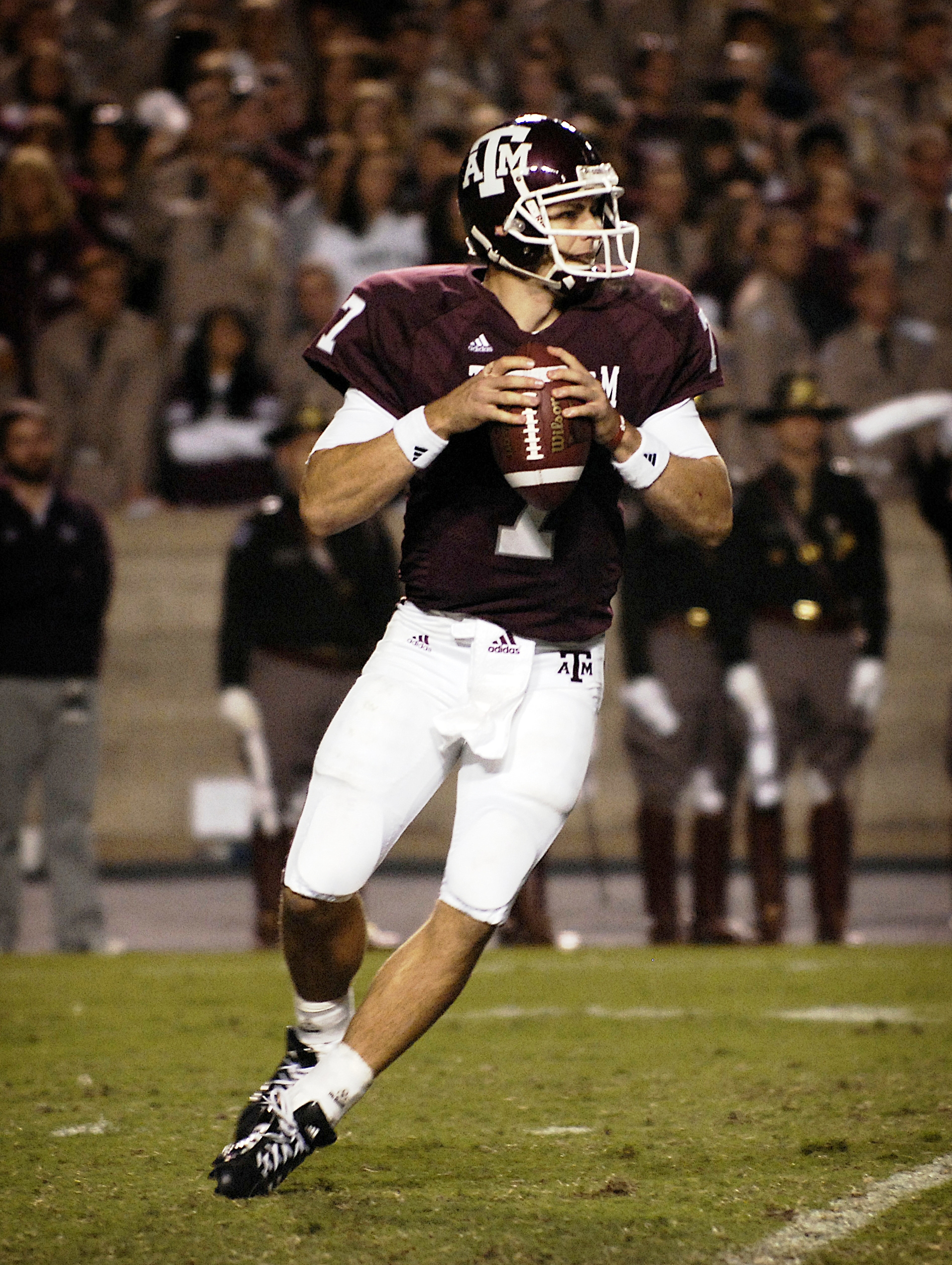
McGee in an October 2007 game

=== 2007 season ===
In June 2007, McGee appeared on the cover of Dave Campbell's Texas Football, alongside Texas quarterback Colt McCoy and TCU defensive end Tommy Blake.

On October 20, he was named Big 12 Offensive Player of the Week after rushing for 167 yards on 35 carries against Nebraska. McGee passed for a career-high of 362 yards in the 2007 Texas game, leading his team to a second consecutive victory over the Longhorns.

McGee contributed to 62% of the team's total offensive yards (3,210 yards). He started all 13 games, completing 211 of 364 passes (58.0%) for 2,311 yards, with 12 touchdowns and eight interceptions. He led all Big 12 quarterbacks in rushing with 899 yards on 181 attempts, while also scoring five rushing touchdowns and posting four 100-plus-yard rushing games. He was one of only three quarterbacks in the nation to throw for over 2,300 yards and rush for over 875 yards.

=== 2008 season ===
McGee came into A&M as a highly regarded passing quarterback, though he was forced to play in an option offense for three years under head coach Dennis Franchione. When Mike Sherman took over as the new head coach, the expectation became that he could thrive in a professional-style offense. He competed for the starting job with sophomore Jerrod Johnson, who was moved to wide receiver. McGee was named the starter for the season opener against Arkansas State, but the Aggies lost 14-18.

In the second game against the University of New Mexico, McGee suffered a sprained right shoulder on the opening series and Johnson replaced him for the rest of the contest, completing 10 of 19 for 124 yards and three touchdowns. In the following game against Army, McGee reaggravated his shoulder injury during the second quarter and likewise had to sit out for the rest of the contest, watching Johnson lead the team to a 21-17 victory.

McGee did not see action in the following two games against Oklahoma State and Kansas State. In the Texas Tech game, he entered the field for one play, which he used to throw a 3-yard touchdown.

Afterwards, he did not play in the victories against Iowa State and Colorado. He saw action in the home matchup against Oklahoma, which also happened to be Senior Day. He finished the game completing 10 of 19 passes for 82 yards. The Aggies lost to the Sooners 66–28.

In the season finale against the University of Texas, he entered the game late in the first quarter in relief of Johnson, to lead the team with 207 yards on 16 of 24 completions. He also had three rushing attempts for a negative 20 yards in a 49–9 loss. During the season, he completed 56 of 85 passes (65.9%) for 586 yards with two touchdowns and two interceptions, despite being limited by a right shoulder injury that forced him to see action in only six games with three starts. He became the fifth quarterback in school history to surpass 5,000 career passing yards.

He finished his college career with 485 of 815 completions for a 59.5% average (school record), 5,475 passing yards (fourth in school history), 7,225 total yards (second in school history), 1,750 rushing yards (third in school history by a quarterback), and 11 rushing touchdowns.

At the end of the year, McGee was named the 2008 winner of the Fellowship of Christian Athletes' National Bobby Bowden Award, which recognizes the "student athlete who conducts himself as a faith model in the community, in the classroom, and on the field".

On January 17, 2009, McGee shared the quarterback position with Tom Brandstater for the West team in the East–West Shrine Game, completing 9 of 14 passes for 128 yards and one touchdown in a 24–19 loss.

=== College statistics ===
Season	Team	Passing						
Season	Team	Cmp	Att	Pct	Yds	TD	Int	Rtg
2005	Texas A&M	24	53	45.3	283	2	1	98.8
2006	Texas A&M	194	313	62.0	2,295	12	2	134.9
2007	Texas A&M	211	364	58.0	2,311	12	8	117.8
2008	Texas A&M	56	85	65.9	586	2	2	126.9
College totals		485	815	59.5	5,475	28	13	124.1

=== College awards ===
- Twice honorable-mention All-Big 12 (2006, 2007)
- Two-time first-team Academic All-Big 12 (2007, 2008)
- Bobby Bowden Award winner (2008)

== Professional career ==
=== Pre-draft ===
At the 2009 NFL Combine, McGee ran a 4.66-second 40-yard dash, which ranked second in his group. He came in fourth after recording 33.0 in (840 mm) in the vertical jump, and fifth with his 9 ft 4 in (2.84 m) in the broad jump. He weighed 222 pounds (101 kg) and measured 6 ft 2 7/8 in (1.902 m) at the Texas A&M Pro Day on March 4, 2009.

Pre-draft measurables
Height	Weight	Arm length	Hand span	40-yard dash	10-yard split	20-yard split	20-yard shuttle	Three-cone drill	Vertical jump	Broad jump
6 ft 2 7/8 in (1.90 m)	225 lb (102 kg)	32 in (0.81 m)	9 in (0.23 m)	4.66 s	1.68 s	2.72 s	4.49 s	7.34 s	33 in (0.84 m)	9 ft 4 in (2.84 m)
Hand and arm spans from Pro Day, all other values from NFL Combine.

=== Dallas Cowboys ===
McGee was selected by the Dallas Cowboys in the fourth round (101st overall) of the 2009 NFL draft. He became the first quarterback drafted by the Cowboys since Quincy Carter in 2001, and the second since 1991. The Cowboys believed him to be a project, since he was mostly employed as an option quarterback, but had the athletic traits and work ethic to succeed. He signed a four-year deal on July 28. He suffered a sprained right medial cruciate ligament, while throwing his first touchdown in the third preseason game against the San Francisco 49ers, forcing him to miss the possibility of considerable playing time in the final preseason contest against the Minnesota Vikings. In the regular season, he was the third-string quarterback and was declared inactive in all 16 games and two playoff contests.

In 2010, he made his first start in the preseason finale against the Miami Dolphins, leading the Cowboys to a 27–25 victory, while completing 27 of 42 passes for 304 yards, one touchdown, and no interceptions. He began the season as the third-string quarterback and was declared inactive in the first six games. In the sixth game against the New York Giants, starter Tony Romo was lost for the season with a broken left clavicle. McGee was promoted to second-string quarterback behind Jon Kitna for the next 9 games. In the Christmas Day game against the Arizona Cardinals, McGee replaced the injured Kitna in the second half, and made his first regular-season touchdown pass to wide receiver Miles Austin. The touchdown gave the Cowboys a 26–24 lead with 1:47 remaining, but the Cardinals soon scored a field goal to win 27–26. McGee recorded 11 of 17 passes for 111 yards, no touchdowns, and a quarterback rating of 102.8. In the season finale against the Philadelphia Eagles, McGee started his first NFL game. He went 11-of-27 for only 127 yards, and threw a touchdown pass to tight end Jason Witten with 55 seconds left to give Dallas a 14-13 victory over their divisional rival.

In 2011, Kitna could not recover from a herniated disk problem he suffered in training camp, and McGee was promoted to backup quarterback on December 14. He only saw action in one game, replacing an injured Romo in the Christmas Eve 20–7 loss to the Philadelphia Eagles, while completing 24 of 38 passes for just 182 yards, one touchdown, and no interceptions.

In 2012, Kitna retired in the offseason and the Cowboys signed free agent Kyle Orton to a three-year contract with a $5 million signing bonus, to be the backup quarterback behind Romo. In the four preseason games where McGee appeared, he tallied no touchdown passes and one interception, and averaged 6.3 yards per attempt. On September 1, McGee was waived after he never developed into a quality backup, and the Cowboys decided to keep only two quarterbacks on the roster.

=== Houston Texans ===
On January 24, 2013, he signed a reserve/future contract with the Houston Texans, joining head coach Gary Kubiak, who was also a former Texas A&M starting quarterback. On August 26, he was released after not being able to beat-second year player Case Keenum for the third-string quarterback job.

=== Hamilton Tiger-Cats ===
On September 25, 2013, he signed with the Hamilton Tiger-Cats of the Canadian Football League. He was the backup quarterback behind Henry Burris. In 2014, he was the third-string quarterback behind Zach Collaros. He was not re-signed after the season.

== Personal life ==
McGee completed his undergraduate coursework in less than four years, receiving a BBA in marketing from Mays Business School at Texas A&M University in August 2007. He completed his master of science in marketing at Mays in 2008.

He enjoys hunting. His dream job is to become a professional deer hunter. He is married to wife Britney.
