= Corey Pullig =

American football player (born 1973)

No. 4
- Position: Quarterback

Personal information
- Born: October 23, 1973 (age 53); Houston, Texas, U.S.
- Listed height: 6 ft 3 in (1.91 m)
- Listed weight: 218 lb (99 kg)

Career information
- High school: Deer Park (TX)
- College: Texas A&M
- NFL draft: 1996: undrafted

Career history
- Grand Rapids Rampage (1998–1999); Buffalo Destroyers (2000); Lafayette Roughnecks (2001)

Awards and highlights
- Second-team All-SWC (1994)

Career AFL statistics
- Comp. / Att.: 174 / 307
- Passing yards: 2,038
- TD–INT: 28-13
- Passer rating: 82.13
- Rushing TDs: 6
- Stats at ArenaFan.com

Corey Pullig (born October 23, 1973) is a former quarterback for Texas A&M University who went on to play professionally for the Arena Football League (AFL)'s Grand Rapids Rampage and Buffalo Destroyers.

== Early life ==
Pullig was a Parade All-American at Deer Park High School in Deer Park, Texas. He was highly recruited and came to Texas A&M after being promised a shot at the starting job by then offensive coordinator Bob Toledo and head coach R. C. Slocum.

== College career ==
=== 1992 season ===
Pullig began his true freshman year (1992) behind sophomore Jeff Granger, but took the job when Granger suffered a concussion against SMU. Making his first start at quarterback for the No. 5-ranked Aggies against Louisville, Pullig led the team to victory in front of an ABC television national audience at Kyle Field.

The next week Pullig outdueled Houston Cougars' quarterback Jimmy Klingler in front of a national television audience on ESPN at the Astrodome. Pullig threw for 272 yards as the Aggies rallied from a 17-10 halftime deficit with 21 unanswered points in the third quarter. His 17 completions in the game ranked No. 3 all-time by a freshman at A&M while his passing yards ranked second.

Texas A&M defeated in-state rival Texas, 31-10, that year at Darrell K Royal–Texas Memorial Stadium in Austin. Texas A&M also defeated all Southwest Conference opponents to win the 1992 Southwest Conference Championship.

Texas A&M faced Notre Dame in the Cotton Bowl and lost 28-3. This was Texas A&M's only loss that season.

=== 1993 season ===
In 1993, Texas A&M lost early in the season to Oklahoma, the only ranked opponent on the schedule that year, before beating in-state rival Texas, 18-9, on Kyle Field in College Station. Like in 1992, Texas A&M swept its Southwest Conference opponents to win the 1993 Southwest Conference Championship.

Texas A&M went on to face Notre Dame in the Cotton Bowl that year. Texas A&M went into halftime up 14-7 and an upset over Notre Dame looked in the making. However, Texas A&M missed some key opportunities in the second half, and Notre Dame won the game 24-21.

=== 1994 season ===
In 1994, Texas A&M went undefeated (11-0-1). The only blemish was a tie to SMU, 21-21, at the Alamodome in San Antonio. However, due to being on NCAA probation at the time, Texas A&M could neither qualify for the Southwest Conference championship nor be invited to a bowl game. Also, Texas A&M football games could not be broadcast on TV.

=== 1995 season ===
In 1995, Texas A&M started the season with high hopes of a national championship. Texas A&M played Colorado, a ranked opponent, in Boulder. A dropped pass early in the game and an interception by Colorado (returned for a touchdown) cost Texas A&M the game (29-21), along with its national championship hopes. Texas A&M lost to Texas Tech in Lubbock the next week, 14-7, on a late interception returned for a touchdown. It took a pass for a touchdown on the last play for Texas A&M to beat SMU, an unranked opponent, the next week. Texas A&M also lost to in-state rival Texas, 16-6, on Kyle Field. This was the final game between Texas A&M and Texas while part of the Southwest Conference.

However, Texas A&M did rebound to beat Michigan in the 1995 Alamo Bowl, 22-20. This was Texas A&M's first bowl victory since the 1991 Holiday Bowl.

=== Overall college career ===
Pullig never relinquished the starting job, setting a school record with 40 consecutive starts. While quarterback, Texas A&M had, at the time, the longest active home game winning streak in the NCAA.

Pullig finished his career with a 33–6–1 mark as a starter, the most wins for any quarterback in Texas A&M history. He also passed for a school record 6,888 yards (broken by Reggie McNeal in 2005). Texas A&M posted ten or eleven wins per season while Pullig was quarterback.

Texas A&M won the Southwest Conference championships in 1992 and 1993. In 1994, Texas A&M ranked first in the Southwest Conference but was unable to qualify for the Southwest Conference championship due to being on probation from the NCAA.

== Professional career ==
Pullig was the starting quarterback for part of the 1998 season for the AFL's Grand Rapids Rampage, and stayed as a reserve the following season. He played in 2000 for the Buffalo Destroyers. Pullig finished his AFL career with 2038 passing yards, 28 touchdowns, 13 interceptions, and an 82.13 passer rating.

== After football ==
After retiring from football, Pullig attended the South Texas College of Law. He then joined the U.S. Marine Corps where he currently serves as a Marine judge advocate.
