= Cyrus Gray =

American football player (born 1989)

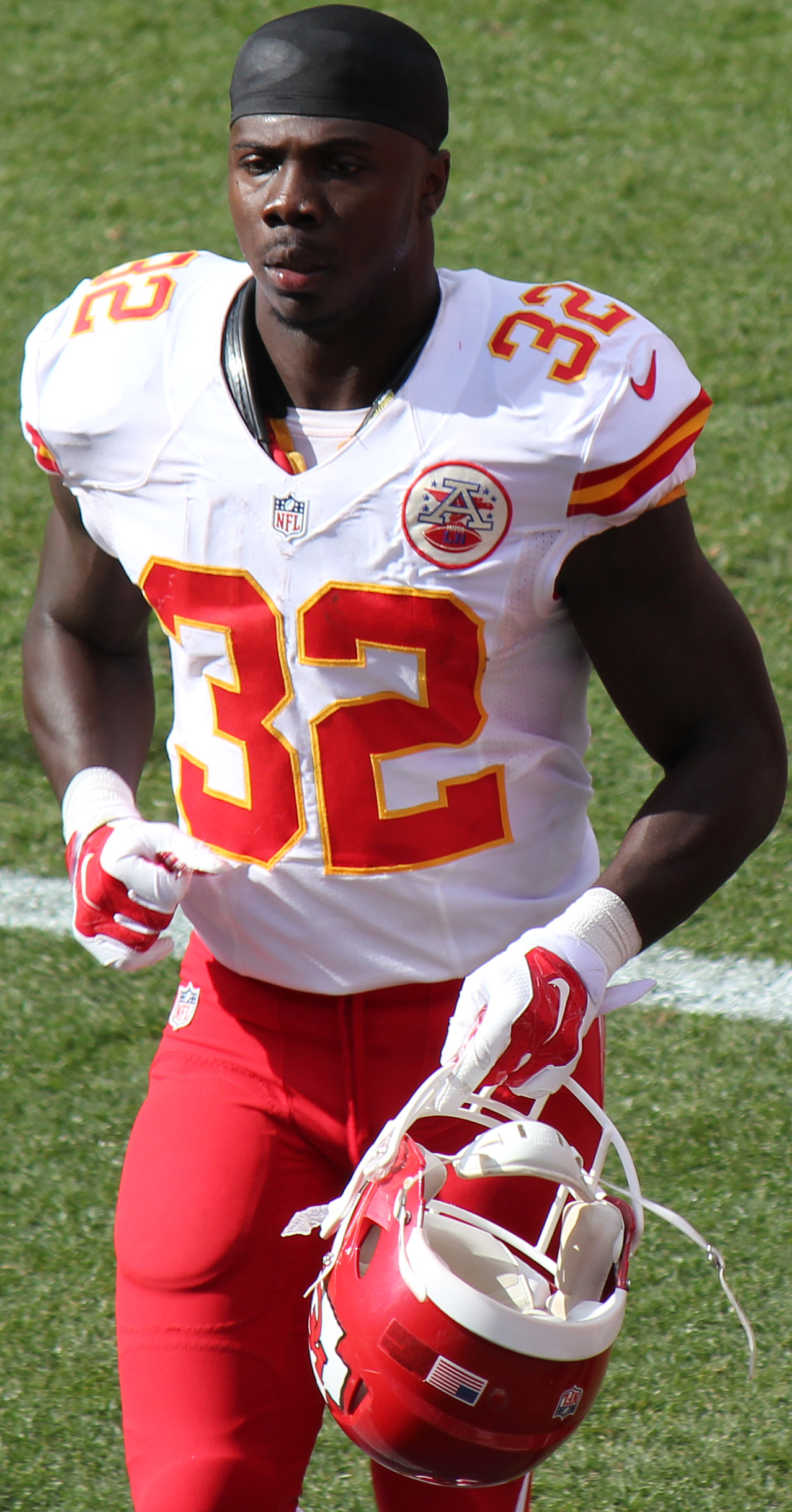
- Gray with the Kansas City Chiefs in 2014

No. 32
- Position: Running back

Personal information
- Born: November 18, 1989 (age 36); DeSoto, Texas, U.S.
- Listed height: 5 ft 10 in (1.78 m)
- Listed weight: 206 lb (93 kg)

Career information
- High school: DeSoto
- College: Texas A&M
- NFL draft: 2012: 6th round, 182nd overall pick

Career history
- Kansas City Chiefs (2012–2014); Denver Broncos (2016)*; Atlanta Falcons (2016)*
- * Offseason or practice squad member only

Awards and highlights
- 2× Second-team All-Big 12 (2010, 2011)

Career NFL statistics
- Rushing attempts: 24
- Rushing yards: 99
- Rushing touchdowns: 1
- Receptions: 9
- Receiving yards: 64
- Stats at Pro Football Reference

Cyrus Danall Gray (born November 18, 1989) is an American former professional football player who was a running back in the National Football League (NFL). He played college football for the Texas A&M Aggies. Gray was selected by the Kansas City Chiefs in the sixth round of the 2012 NFL draft. He also had brief stints during the 2016 off-season with the Denver Broncos and Atlanta Falcons.

== Early life ==
Gray first attended Duncanville High School before DeSoto High School, where he played football and ran track. In football, he played running back for the DeSoto Eagles football team. During his award-winning junior campaign, he ran for 1,482 yards and 31 touchdowns while also hauling in 38 passes for 436 yards and two more scores, being named to the Texas Sports Writer's Association All-State Second-team as a kick returner and Third-team as a running back. As a senior, he garnered Honorable Mention 5A All-State running back honors from both The Associated Press and the Texas Sports Writer's Association after rushing for 1,975 yards and 28 touchdowns.

In track & field, Gray was one of the state's top performers in the 100-meter dash. He ran a PR of 10.74 seconds in the 100 meters at the 2007 Jesuit Sheaner Relays, placing second. In addition, he also ran 41.80 seconds on the Desoto's 4 × 100 m relay squad.

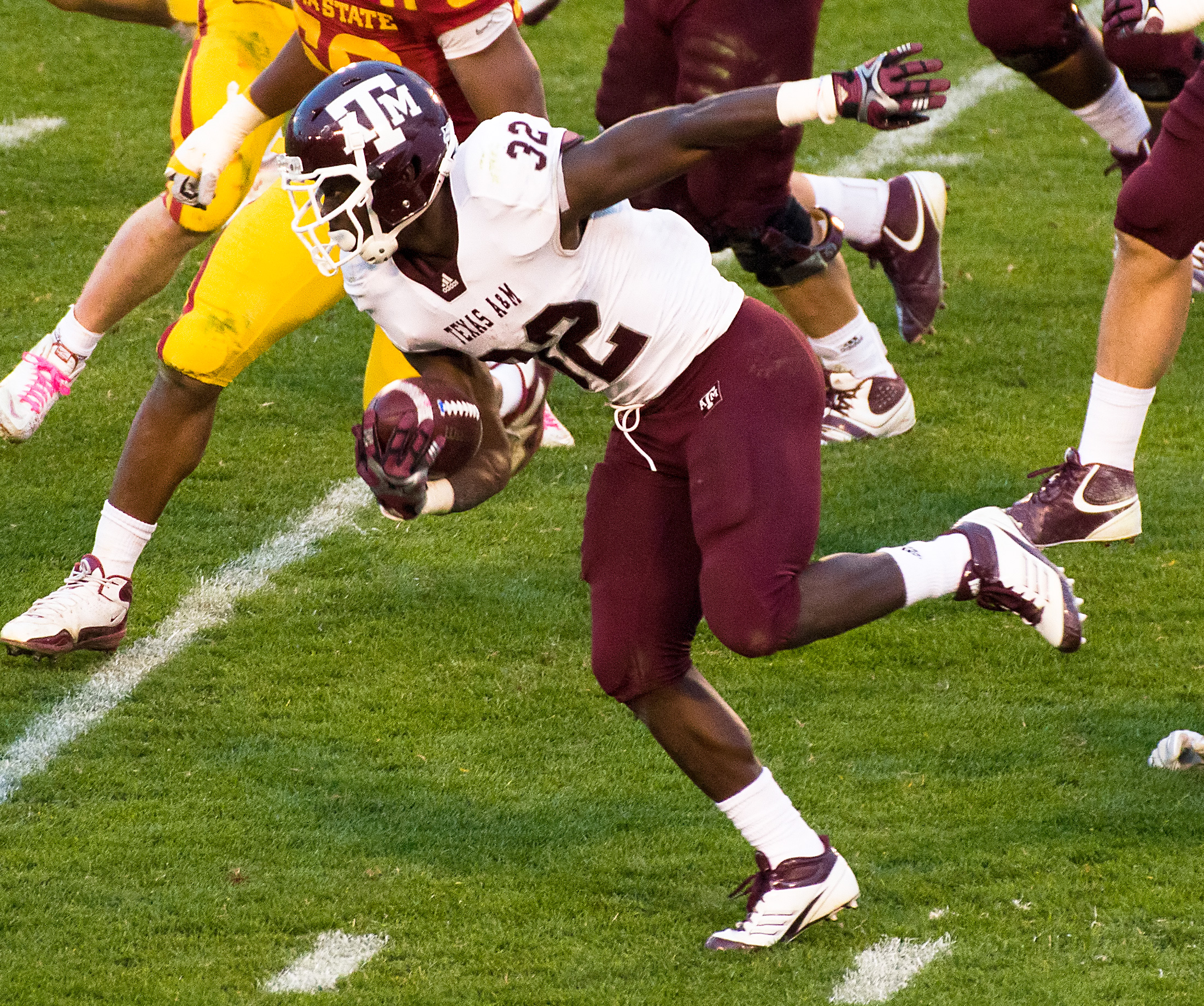
Gray vs Iowa State in 2011

== College career ==
As a junior at Texas A&M University in 2010, Gray rushed for 1,133 yards with 12 touchdowns and was an All-Big 12 honorable mention for the second consecutive season.

== Professional career ==
=== Kansas City Chiefs ===
In the 2012 NFL draft, Gray was selected by the Kansas City Chiefs in the sixth round of the draft. Before the season, Gray was listed 5th string on the depth chart. He got his first career carry against the San Diego Chargers on September 30, 2012. It was for 15 yards. Gray finished the season with 44 yards on 7 carries. On July 29, 2015, Gray was released by the Chiefs.

=== Denver Broncos ===
Gray signed with the Denver Broncos on July 27, 2016, but was released the next day.

=== Atlanta Falcons ===
On August 10, 2016, Gray was signed by the Atlanta Falcons. On August 29, Gray was released by the Falcons with an injury settlement.

Sporting positions
Preceded by Christine Michael	Texas A&M starting running backs 2010–2012	Succeeded by Christine Michael
