= 2007 Texas A&M Aggies football team =

American college football season

2007 Texas A&M Aggies football

Alamo Bowl, L 17–24 vs. Penn State
- Conference: Big 12 Conference
- South Division
- Record: 7–6 (4–4 Big 12)
- Head coach: Dennis Franchione (5th season; regular season); Gary Darnell (interim; bowl game)
- Offensive coordinator: Les Koenning (5th season)
- Offensive scheme: Multiple
- Defensive coordinator: Gary Darnell (2nd season)
- Base defense: 4–2–5
- Home stadium: Kyle Field

Uniform

2007 Big 12 Conference football standings
	Conf.			Overall
Team	W		L	W		L
North Division
No. 4 Missouri xy	7	–	1	12	–	2
No. 7 Kansas x%	7	–	1	12	–	1
Colorado	4	–	4	6	–	7
Kansas State	3	–	5	5	–	7
Nebraska	2	–	6	5	–	7
Iowa State	2	–	6	3	–	9
South Division
No. 8 Oklahoma xy$	6	–	2	11	–	3
No. 10 Texas	5	–	3	10	–	3
No. 22 Texas Tech	4	–	4	9	–	4
Oklahoma State	4	–	4	7	–	6
Texas A&M	4	–	4	7	–	6
Baylor	0	–	8	3	–	9
Championship: Oklahoma 38, Missouri 17
$ – BCS representative as conference champion; % – BCS at-large representative; x – Division champion/co-champions; y – Championship game participant; Rankings from AP Poll

The 2007 Texas A&M Aggies football team (often referred to as "A&M" or the "Aggies") represented Texas A&M University in the 2007 NCAA Division I FBS football season. The team was coached by Dennis Franchione, who had coached at A&M since the 2003 season, but resigned at the conclusion of the annual game with the Texas Longhorns. The Aggies were led on offense by junior quarterback Stephen McGee. The team played their home games at Kyle Field, an 82,600-person capacity stadium on A&M's campus in College Station, Texas. The Fightin' Texas Aggie Band performs at all home games and select away games during half-time.

The 2006 Aggie team finished with 9 wins and 4 losses, including a loss in the 2006 Holiday Bowl. In a 2007 preseason ranking, ESPN sports columnist Mark Schlabach ranked the Aggies 15th. In their preseason polls, both the Coaches Poll and the AP Poll ranked the Aggies 25th. A Rivals.com writer ranked A&M as having the 9th toughest road schedule.

The Aggies completed the 2007 season with a 7–6 record, with their final game resulting in a 24–17 loss to Penn State in the 2007 Alamo Bowl.

== Schedule ==
Date	Time	Opponent	Rank	Site	TV	Result	Attendance	Source
September 1	6:00 p.m.	No. 21 (FCS) Montana State*	No. 25	Kyle Field; College Station, TX		W 38–7	79,438	
September 8	2:30 p.m.	Fresno State*	No. 23	Kyle Field; College Station, TX	FSN	W 47–45 ^{3OT}	75,922	
September 15	6:00 p.m.	Louisiana–Monroe*	No. 25	Kyle Field; College Station, TX		W 54–14	77,309	
September 20	6:45 p.m.	at Miami (FL)*	No. 20	Miami Orange Bowl; Miami, FL	ESPN	L 17–34	44,622	
September 29	11:30 a.m.	Baylor		Kyle Field; College Station, TX (Battle of the Brazos)	Versus	W 34–10	82,970	
October 6	6:30 p.m.	Oklahoma State		Kyle Field; College Station, TX	FSN	W 24–23	86,217	
October 13	2:30 p.m.	at Texas Tech		Jones AT&T Stadium; Lubbock, TX (rivalry)	ABC	L 7–35	55,491	
October 20	1:05 p.m.	at Nebraska		Memorial Stadium; Lincoln, NE		W 36–14	84,473	
October 27	6:00 p.m.	No. 12 Kansas		Kyle Field; College Station, TX	ESPN2	L 11–19	85,341	
November 3	7:00 p.m.	at No. 5 Oklahoma		Gaylord Family Oklahoma Memorial Stadium; Norman, OK	ABC	L 14–42	85,044	
November 10	11:30 a.m.	at No. 7 Missouri		Faurot Field; Columbia, MO	FSN	L 26–40	64,945	
November 23	2:30 p.m.	No. 13 Texas		Kyle Field; College Station, TX (rivalry)	ABC	W 38–30	88,253	
December 29	7:00 p.m.	vs. Penn State*		Alamodome; San Antonio, TX (Alamo Bowl)	ESPN	L 17–24	66,166	
*Non-conference game; Rankings from AP Poll released prior to the game; All times are in Central time

== Coaching staff ==
Name	Position	Years at A&M*	Alma mater (Year)
Dennis Franchione	Head coach	5	Pittsburg (Kan.) State (1973)
Kenith Pope	Associate head coach; Running Backs	5	Oklahoma (1976)
Gary Darnell	Defensive coordinator, Interim head coach	2	Oklahoma State (1969)
Les Koenning, Jr.	Offensive coordinator; Quarterbacks	5	Texas (1981)
Bill Clay	Safeties	2	Arkansas (1963)
Bob DeBesse	Wide receivers	2	Southwest Texas State (1982)
Stan Eggen	Defensive line	5	Moorhead (MN) State (1977)
Jim Bob Helduser	Offensive line	5	Texas Lutheran (1979)
Van Malone	Cornerbacks	2	Texas (1993)
Mark Tommerdahl	Tight ends/special teams coordinator	5	Concordia College (1983)
*Includes the 2007 season

- Brad Davis (graduate assistant)

=== Head coach controversy ===
==== Call for dismissal ====
After the Aggies' 34–17 loss at Miami, head coach Dennis Franchione's coaching has been bought into question by some members of the media. An ESPN writer gave honorable mention to the A&M coaches' play-calling in the Miami game in his weekly Bottom 10 college football game rankings. As of Tuesday, September 25, the website firefranpetition.com has received over 15,000 hits after A&M's loss to Miami. 300 people had signed the online petition that Monday, bringing the total to 2,600. The website has also sold nearly 200 "Can Fran" shirts. The Bryan-College Station Eagle, the area's local newspaper, included a front page picture of A&M's Pi Kappa Phi chapter members hanging a "Fire Fran" sign from their fraternity house.

==== Secret newsletter ====
On September 27, 2007, Franchione discontinued selling a secret email newsletter to athletic boosters who paid US$1,200 annually for team information that Franchione has refused to release to the public. The newsletter, called "VIP Connection", had been written by Franchione's personal assistant, Mike McKenzie, and included specific injury reports and Franchione's critical assessments of players. The newsletter attracted 27 recipients, 6 of whom received the newsletter for free. 20 of the recipients have been disclosed. The boosters were asked to sign a confidentiality statement to assure the information in the newsletter was not used for gambling. Though Franchione and McKenzie denied gaining profit from the newsletter, Franchione stated that proceeds went to the company that managed his now-defunct website, coachfran.com. The newsletter was discovered by athletic director Bill Byrne after it was presented to him by a San Antonio Express-News reporter, who had received it through a third-party source. Byrne immediately instructed Franchione to discontinue the newsletter, at which time Franchione complied. Refunds have been offered to the subscribers, though it is uncertain how many asked for one. In a press conference the following Tuesday, October 2, Franchione apologized in front of A&M football players and expressed his love for the job and the university, and his desire to "elevate the program to its highest level". A&M players also expressed their support for Franchione as a coach. Shortly after, an investigation had been launched to look into the matter, conducted by Bill Byrne and A&M's NCAA compliance officer, David Batson.

On Thursday, October 11, Texas A&M officials issued a "letter of admonishment" and ordered that the website CoachFran.com be shut down. Additionally, Franchione was instructed to no longer employ "any staff members that could be construed as representing Texas A&M or providing information or reports relative to his position as head coach at Texas A&M". Consequently, the writer of the newsletter, Mike McKenzie, was fired. Byrne stated that the incident would be included in Franchione's "performance review" at the end of the season.

==== Resignation ====
After Franchione led the Aggies to a 38–30 victory over the 13th-ranked Texas Longhorns, he announced his resignation in the post-game press conference. In the press conference, after he discussed the game, he read out loud a farewell letter that he had prepared beforehand. His last words were "Thank you, and gig 'em." Franchione immediately left the press conference as A&M athletic director Bill Byrne started to speak, with friends and family members following him. The following day, Byrne named defensive coordinator Gary Darnell as interim head coach. Darnell will coach the Aggies' bowl game. On November 26, 2007, three days after Franchione resigned, former Green Bay Packers head coach Mike Sherman was announced as the new head football coach.

=== Jobs after the season ===
After the season, cornerbacks coach Van Malone was retained by new head coach Mike Sherman, and offensive coordinator Les Koenning move to the same position at South Alabama. Running backs coach Kenith Pope was hired at UNLV. Tight ends and special teams coach Mark Tommerdahl moved to Louisiana–Monroe, while defensive line coach Stan Eggen was hired at Louisiana Tech. Safeties coach Bill Clay moved to Samford. Offensive line coach Jim Bob Helduser was hired at Bryan High School, and wide receivers coach Bob DeBesse was hired at A&M Consolidated High School. Gary Darnell was the only assistant that has not found a coaching job.

== Players ==
=== Roster ===
The roster consists of 47 freshmen, 37 sophomores, 30 juniors, and 20 seniors. Scholarship players include 18 true freshmen, 9 redshirt freshmen, 23 sophomores, 17 juniors, and 16 seniors.

(as of September 14, 2007)
Quarterbacks: 1 Jerrod Johnson -Fr.-RS; 7 Stephen McGee** -Jr.-2L; 9 Jeff Wood -So.-SQ; 14 Kevin Westerman -Fr.-HS; 18 T.J. Sanders -Sr.-SQ; 19 Ryan Tannehill -Fr.-HS; Running backs: 3 Mike Goodson -So.-1L; 11 Jorvorskie Lane -Jr.-2L; 22 Latrael Cooper -Fr.-RS; 23 Cornell Tarrant -Fr.-RS; 26 Keondra Smith -So.-SQ; 28 Bradley Stephens -Fr.-HS; 34 Colton Haverda -Fr.-HS; 43 Jodie Richardson -So.-SQ; Full backs: 24 Chris Alexander** -Sr.-3L; 44 Nick LaMantia** -Jr.-1L; Wide receivers: 2 Earvin Taylor** -Sr.-3L; 4 Jamie McCoy -So.-SQ; 5 Howard Morrow -Jr.-2L; 6 Pierre Brown -Jr.-2L; 8 Kerry Franks** -Sr.-3L; 10 E.J. Shankle -So.-1L; 15 Colin Marburger -Fr.-RS; 17 Jeremy Brown -So.-SQ; 20 Michael Corey -Sr.-SQ; 20 Randle Taylor -Fr.-HS; 21 Roger Holland -Fr.-HS; 25 Randle Jackson -So.-SQ; 30 Don Bishop -So.-HS; 80 Lorenzo Calloway -Jr.-SQ; 82 Antonio Perry -So.-SQ; 83 Terrence McCoy -Fr.-RS; 84 Drew Williamson -Jr.-SQ; 86 Nick Trice -Fr.-HS; 87 Chris Caflisch -Fr.-RS; 88 Cody Beyer -So.-SQ	Tight ends: 13 Martellus Bennett -Jr.-2L; 81 Joey Thomas** -Sr.-3L; 89 Frank Avery -Fr.-HS; 90 Harold Turnage -Fr.-HS; 91 Ryan Vaughn -Jr.-SQ; 94 Cory Multer -So.-SQ; 98 Andrew Key -So.-SQ; 99 Travis Reynolds -Jr.-HS; Offensive line: 51 Chris Yoder Sr.-3L; 54 Corey Clark Sr.-3L; 55 Danny Baker Fr.-HS; 56 Matt Rankin Fr.-RS; 58 Ryan Whitmer Fr.-RS; 59 Brandon Lewis Fr.-HS; 60 Josh Russell So.-SQ; 61 Vincent Williams So.-SQ; 63 Kevin Matthews So.-SQ; 64 Kirk Elder** Sr.-3L; 65 Evan Eike Fr.-HS; 66 Philip Walter Fr.-RS; 68 Eric Pennington Fr.-RS; 69 Craig Raschke Fr.-RS; 70 Cody Wallace** Sr.-2L; 71 Yemi Babalola Jr.-2L; 73 Price Ferguson Fr.-RS; 74 Lee Grimes So.-SQ; 75 Travis Schneider Jr.-2L; 76 Michael Shumard So.-1L; 79 Robbie Frost So.-SQ; Linebackers: 34 Derrick Stephens -Jr.-SQ; 36 Anthony Lewis -So.-1L; 37 Misi Tupe** -Sr.-1L; 43 Gary Randall -Fr.-RS; 44 Cody Renfro -Jr.-TR; 46 Matt Featherston -So.-1L; 48 Michael Weeks -Fr.-HS; 50 Mark Dodge** -Sr.-1L; 53 Derek Dumas -So.-SQ; 57 Dustin Riewe -Jr.-SQ; 99 Travis Reynolds -Jr.-HS	Defensive backs: 1 Johnathan Batson Sr.-1L; 2 Marcus Gold So.-SQ; 3 Ben Bitner Sr.-SQ; 4 Danny Gorrer Jr.-2L; 8 Matt Almaraz Jr.-SQ; 9 Alton Dixon Jr.-2L; 10 Billy Chavis Fr.-HS; 13 Marquis Carpenter Sr.-2L; 14 Charles Roy Fr.-RS; 15 Kenny Brown Fr.-RS; 18 Arkeith Brown Jr.-2L; 19 Charles Hewitt So.-SQ; 21 David Latham Jr.-SQ; 22 Jeff Karr Jr.-SQ; 24 Tyler Kociuba So.-SQ; 25 Jordan Pugh So.-1L; 26 Devin Gregg** Jr.-2L; 27 Jordan Peterson** So.-1L; 28 Kevin Smith Fr.-HS; 29 Stephen Hodge Sr.-3L; 30 Chevar Bryson So.-1L; 31 Will Harris So.-RS; 32 Garrick Williams Fr.-HS; 33 Lionel Smith Fr.-HS; 39 Charles Young Fr.-HS; 41 DeMaurier Thompson Fr.-RS; 42 Johnathan Haynes Jr.-RS; 45 Rawley Farrell Sr.-SQ; 47 Justin McQueen Fr.-HS; Defensive ends: 35 Brandon Joiner -Fr.-HS	Defensive line: 11 Michael Bennett.-2L; 40 Von Miller Fr.-HS; 49 Cyril Obiozor Jr.-2L; 65 Spencer Robnett Fr.-RS; 67 Sam Giesselmann Jr.-SQ; 72 Ben Bass Fr.-HS; 76 Andrew Engram So.-HS; 77 Lucas Patterson Fr.-RS; 78 Burl Jordan So.-HS; 84 Chris Smith Jr.-1L; 85 Red Bryant** Sr.-3L; 86 Amos Gbunblee Jr.-2L; 87 John Nienhiser So.-HS; 89 Jarret Cantu So.-SQ; 91 Kellen Heard So.-1L; 92 Chris Harrington** Sr.-3L; 93 Paul Freeney So.-SQ; 95 Henry Smith Sr.-1L; 96 Michael Ebbitt Fr.-HS; 96 Nick Fusco Fr.-RS; 98 Thomas Jones Jr.-HS; 99 David Tufuga So.-TR; Deep snappers: 47 Cory Davis -Jr.-1L; 52 Corey Gibas -So.-1L; Kickoff: 7 Matt Szymanski -So.-1L; Punters: 7 Matt Szymanski -So.-1L; 16 Justin Brantly -Jr.-2L; 27 Richie Bean -Jr.-1L; Key; The abbreviations indicate amount of experience: Fr.-HS = True freshman; Fr.-RS = Redshirt freshman; So. = Sophomore; Jr. = Junior; Sr. = Senior; 1L, 2L, 3L means the player has lettered; for 1, 2, or 3 years, respectively.: SQ indicates that the player has not lettered.; **Indicates that the player is a member of the 2007 Aggie Leadership Council

=== Watch lists ===
Aggies named to pre-season award watch lists include:

- Martellus Bennett
  - John Mackey Award watch list
- Justin Brantly
  - Ray Guy Award watch list
- Red Bryant
  - Chuck Bednarik Award watch list
- Kirk Elder
  - Lombardi Award watch list
- Mike Goodson
  - Doak Walker Award watch list
  - Maxwell Award watch list
- Chris Harrington
  - Chuck Bednarik Award watch list
  - Hendricks Award watch list
  - Lombardi Award watch list
  - Lott Trophy watch list
- Jorvorskie Lane
  - Doak Walker Award watch list
- Stephen McGee
  - Maxwell Award watch list
- Cody Wallace
  - Lombardi Award watch list
  - Outland Trophy watch list
  - Rimington Trophy watch list

=== Postseason honors ===
Cody Wallace was named the Big 12 Offensive Lineman of the Year and made the All-Big 12 Football First Team. Chris Alexander, Chris Harrington, and Misi Tupe, as well as Justin Brantly, made the All-Big 12 Football Second Team. Michael Bennett, Martellus Bennett, Red Bryant, Marquis Carpenter, Corey Clark, Mark Dodge, Kirk Elder, Jorvorskie Lane, and Stephen McGee received an all-Big 12 Honorable Mention. Additionally, five players made the all-Big 12 Academic First Team, which requires a 3.20 GPA or above. Of those players are David Latham, Stephen McGee, Jordan Peterson, T.J. Sanders (who was one of seven Big 12 players to have a 4.00 GPA), and Cody Wallace. Two players made the all-Big 12 Academic Second Team, which requires a 3.00–3.19 GPA, including Andrew Key and Chris Yoder.

Cody Wallace is a Rimington Trophy finalist.

=== Arrests ===
On December 5, 2007, junior offensive lineman Yemi Babalola was charged with aggravated robbery of a residence and possession of marijuana, and was convicted in 2009, with a 5-year prison sentence, but later released on parole in December 2011. When police got a search warrant to search Babalola's home, they had found marijuana. Police had also searched the home of freshman defensive end Brandon Joiner, and found marijuana, ecstasy, and hydrocodone. B. Joiner was subsequently charged with possession of marijuana and possession of a controlled substance, and was sentenced to 3 years in prison in May 2012.

== Game summaries ==
=== Montana State ===
	1	2	3	4	Total
Montana State	7	0	0	0	7
#25 Texas A&M	10	7	7	14	38

The 2007 Division I-AA Montana State Bobcats are led by coach Rob Ash, who became the school's 31st head football coach on June 11, 2007. Ash replaced Mike Kramer, who coached at Montana State from 1989 to 2006, but was fired after five current and former Bobcat players were arrested within the same year.

The Bobcats have played notably against some of their Big 12 opponents. In 2004, they nearly defeated Oklahoma State at the Cowboys' home field, until the Cowboys pushed hard for a 15–10 win. In their 2006 season opener, the Bobcats defeated the Colorado Buffaloes 19–10 on the Buffaloes' home field, pulling off one of the season's biggest upsets in college football.

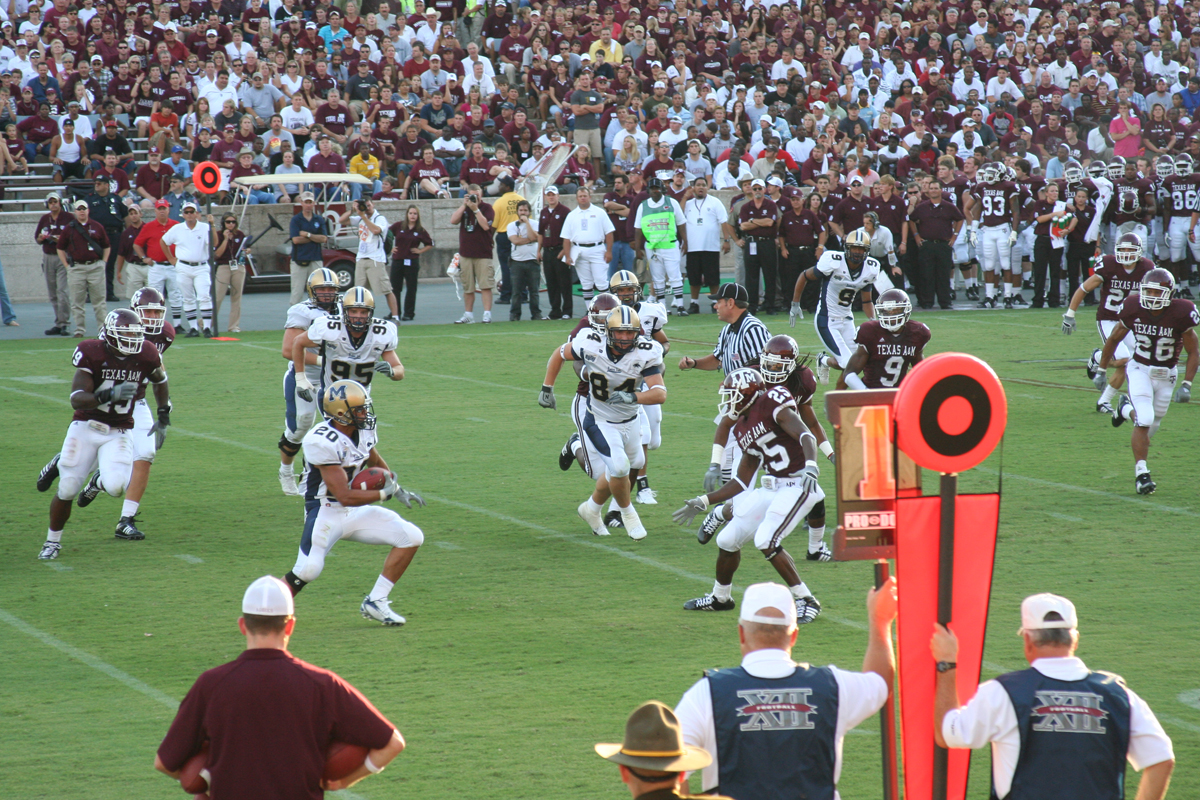
The Bobcats on one of their possessions

In the game, quarterback Stephen McGee, whose yardage came primarily from option keepers, rushed for 121 yards on nine carries and made 2 touchdown runs, one for 65 yards. He completed 10 of his 20 passes for only 112 yards; his longest completion was 23 yards. Freshman backup quarterback Jerrod Johnson replaced McGee in the fourth quarter and made the only scoring pass in the game (17 yards to Terrence McCoy) with 80 seconds left in the game. The A&M defense, especially the secondary, did not perform well, allowing Montana State to compile a 304 passing yards and complete 26 of 48 passes. In the 2006 season, only Texas Tech and Missouri threw for more yards against the Aggies. The A&M defense allowed the Bobcats to gain a total of 403 yards. Notable plays by the Bobcats included an 83-yard scoring drive on 13 plays on their opening possession and a 50-yard reception by receiver Josh Lewis late in the second half. The Bobcats, however, missed three field goals and lost a fumble in A&M territory.

=== Fresno State ===
	1	2	3	4	OT	2OT	3OT	Total
Fresno State	0	0	14	15	3	7	6	45
#23 Texas A&M	7	12	3	7	3	7	8	47

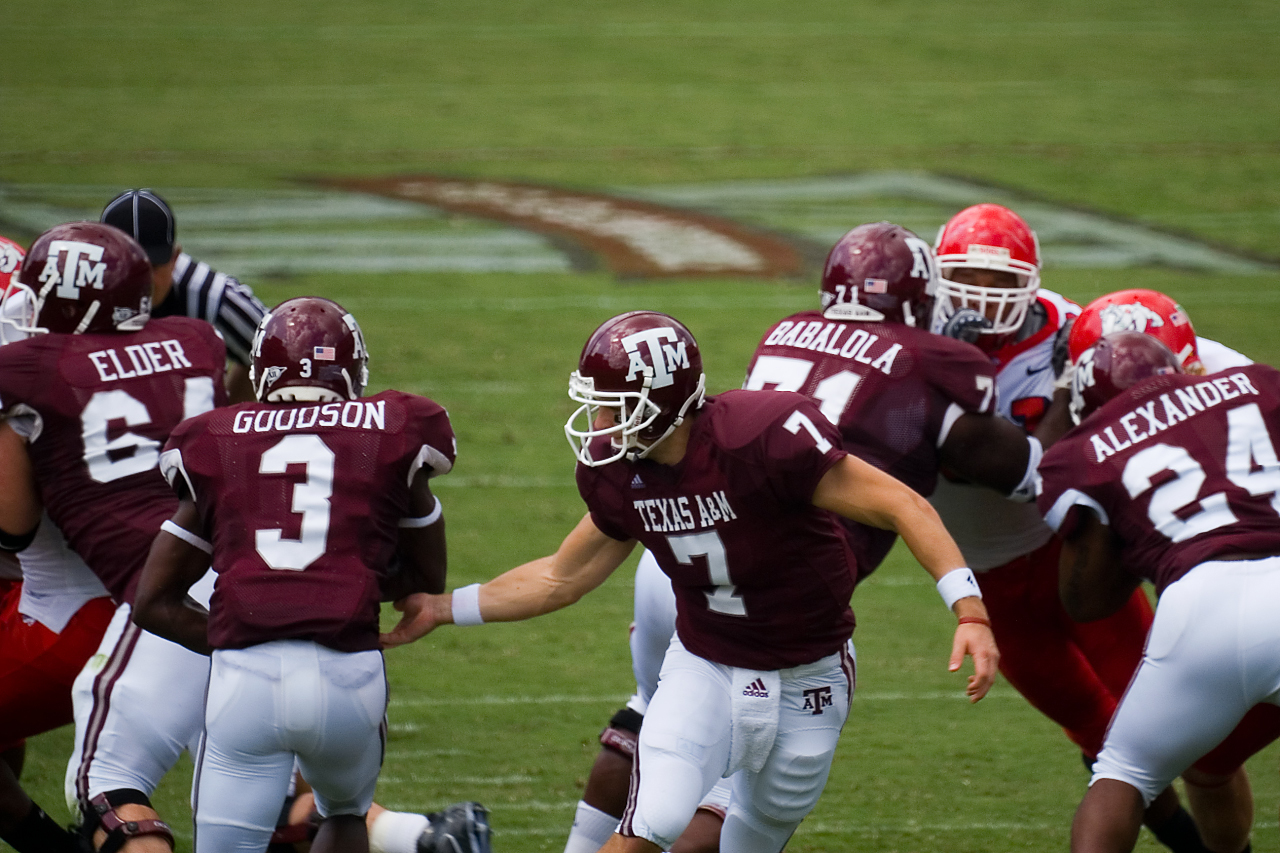
McGee hands off to Goodson

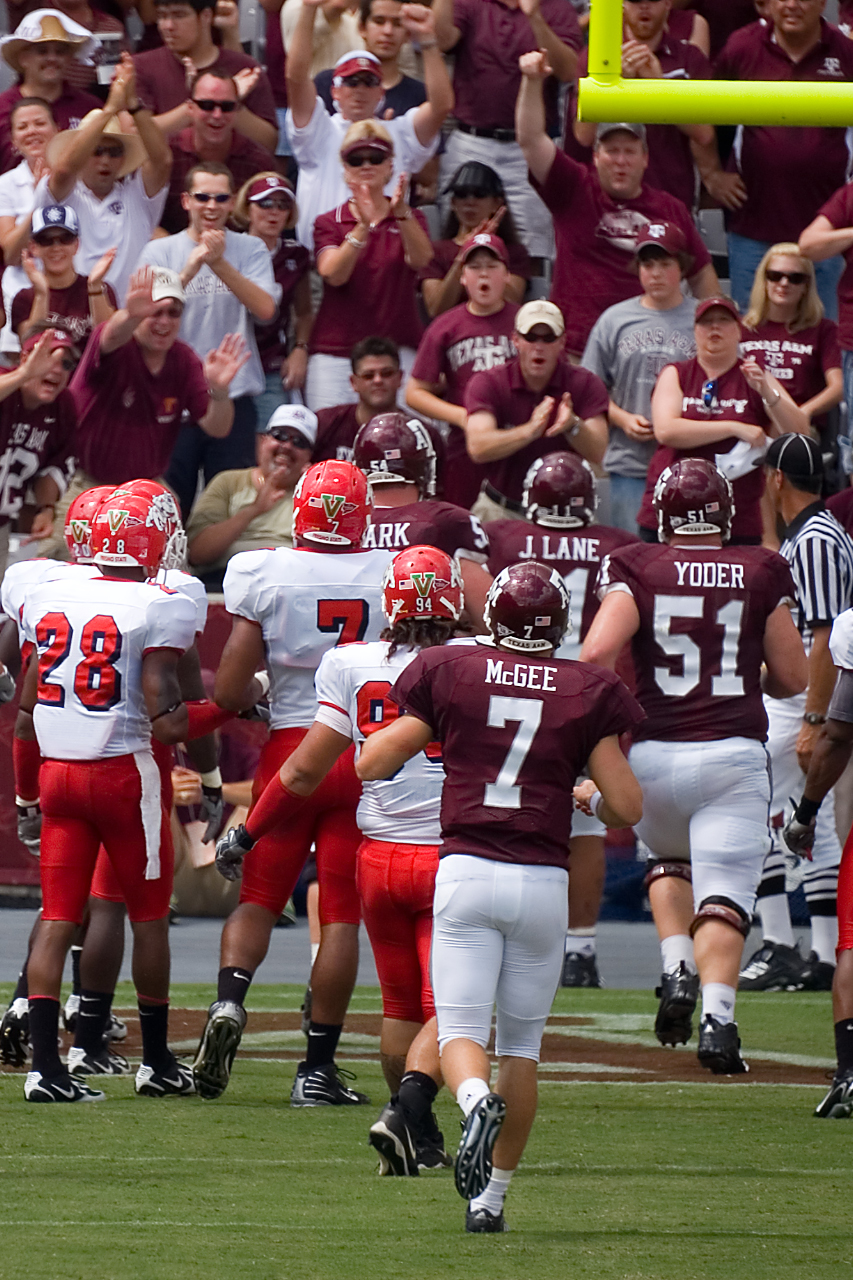
Jorvorskie making his first of four touchdowns of the game

This was the first-ever meeting between the Fresno State Bulldogs and the Aggies. The unranked Fresno State team was coached by Pat Hill, who compiled a 10–19 record against BCS teams during his tenure at Fresno State prior to the game. Prior to this game, A&M had a 10–1 home field record against nonconference teams under Dennis Franchione. In their season opener, the Bulldogs defeated Sacramento State 24–3, allowing only 100 offensive yards, including only 41 rushing yards. This put pressure on the Aggie offensive line as it did not perform solidly in the Montana State game.

The Bulldogs had not faced a "large and rowdy" crowd and heated competition since November 2005 against the No. 1 USC Trojans at the Los Angeles Memorial Coliseum. The Bulldogs practiced for the A&M home game environment by holding practice at Bulldog Stadium with crowd noise and the Aggie War Hymn blaring from the speakers.

In the first half, the Aggies remained unscored upon, leading 19–0. The Bulldogs gained only 78 yards and 5 first downs. In the second half, however, they retaliated by gaining 267 yards and scoring 29 points. The Bulldogs scored a touchdown and a field goal with five seconds remaining in the fourth quarter to tie the game at 29–29 and forcing an overtime. A controversial play by the Bulldogs in the first overtime, when A&M led 32–29, caused the officials to review the play. When quarterback Tom Brandstater threw to receiver Marlon Moore, Moore attempted to stretch the ball over the goal line but fumbled into the end zone, causing the Aggies to recover. An official, however, ruled that Moore went out of bounds on the 1-yard line. Officials took an extensive 22-minute review of the play, and after reviewing various camera angles, ruled that Moore had fumbled into the endzone and A&M recovered. However, A&M tackle Henry Smith was also flagged for roughing the passer. The result of the controversial call was a Fresno State first down inside the A&M 13. Unable to score a touchdown, the Bulldogs elected to kick a field goal to tie the game at 32, forcing a second overtime in which both teams scored touchdowns. In the third overtime, Bulldog quarterback Tom Brandstater failed the two-point conversion after he overthrew the ball into the end zone.

Running back Jorvorskie Lane, who rushed for a total of 121 yards, was crucial to the Aggies during the overtime periods. ESPN reported, "Texas A&M turned to its powerful running back to stave off Fresno State...Jorvorskie Lane rushed for two of his four touchdowns in the second and third overtimes as the 23rd-ranked Aggies beat the feisty Bulldogs 47-45 in the first three-OT game in A&M history. The 6-foot, 268-pound Lane barreled for his final touchdown from 3 yards out, then charged into the end zone again for the winning 2-point conversion on A&M's final possession."

Overall, the Bulldogs outgained the Aggies 399–397 in total offensive yards. Bulldog quarterback Tom Brandstater threw for 260 yards with three touchdowns and one interception. Bulldog receiver Bear Pascoe caught seven passes for 70 yards and three touchdowns. A&M rushed for 318 yards but compiled only 79 passing yards. When confronted by a reporter about the passing situation, A&M quarterback Stephen McGee argued that rushing is most effective as Fresno State was unable to stop the ball. The game became the first three-overtime game in A&M history, and the ninth consecutive nonconference victory at Kyle. After the game, Secretary of Defense Robert Gates, who served as A&M president from 2002 to 2006, posted on TexAgs the following: "Okay, Ags. I really don't need that kind of stress right now. But a W is a W. All the best to everyone." Gates had not posted on the site since he revealed his identity on December 7, 2006.

=== Louisiana–Monroe ===
	1	2	3	4	Total
Louisiana–Monroe	7	0	0	7	14
#18 Texas A&M	10	17	14	13	54

The Louisiana–Monroe Warhawks came into the game with a 0–2 record, suffering losses from Tulsa and the 25th-ranked Clemson Tigers. The Warhawks ranked 107th nationally in pass defense, allowing a total of 626 passing yards in their first two games. Warhawk players carrying notable statistics include running back Calvin Dawson, who ranked 14th in the nation in rushing and led a 17th-ranked rushing offense, and free safety Greg James, who led the Warhawk defense with 17 tackles. Kicker Cole Wilson was named Sun Belt Conference specialist of the week after converting field goals of 23 and 41 yards against Clemson.

After the Aggies' shaky three-overtime performance the previous week, coach Dennis Franchione stated that a different offensive scheme would be implemented. After their first two games, the Aggies' rushing offense ranked ninth in the nation, and its passing offense ranked 115th. The A&M defense had allowed 802 total offensive yards in the first two games. This is the Aggies' second meeting with ULM, and in their first meeting in 1985, the Aggies defeated ULM 31–7. Head coach Dennis Franchione had faced ULM twice in his career as head coach of Southwest Texas State, and lost 27–30 and 8–17 in 1990 and 1991 both times, respectively.

In the game, quarterback Stephen McGee threw for 237 yards, completing 19 of 33 attempts, and rushed for 18 yards on four carries. Head coach Dennis Franchione made good on his assurances of a different offensive scheme, allowing McGee to earn more yards in the air than on the ground for the first time in the 2007 season. However, the Aggies continued to focus on their ground-based offense, earning 310 yards rushing. In the third quarter, McGee was picked off, ending his streak of 150 passing attempts without an interception. Backup quarterback Jerrod Johnson entered the game in the third quarter, scoring two rushing touchdowns on three drives, with a third touchdown by running back Keondra Smith. The A&M offense finished with 547 total yards, the most since earning 694 yards against the Oklahoma State Cowboys on October 15, 2005. A&M scored on nine out of its ten possessions, including the first five in the first half.

Senior wide receiver Kerry Franks made a career-high of five receptions for 82 yards, and caught a 20-yard touchdown pass to lead the Aggies 34–7 shortly into the third quarter. Running back Mike Goodson rushed for 113 yards and scored one touchdown on 11 carries, marking his first 100-yard rushing game of the season. Running back Jorvorskie Lane only rushed for 34 yards on 11 carries, though made two short-yard rushing touchdowns, bringing his touchdown number to 35 and becoming third in all-time rushing touchdowns in school history. Tight end Martellus Bennett matched a career-high of six catches for 98 yards. Early into the week of the game, Bennett decided to switch his jersey number from 13 to 85, in honor of former Buffalo Bills tight end Kevin Everett, who suffered a career-ending broken neck injury the previous Sunday. The two have been close friends ever since they met on Martellus' recruiting trip to Miami.

Louisiana–Monroe rushed for 215 yards with 133 yards passing, scoring a touchdown in the first and fourth quarters. Running back Calvin Dawson made 20 carries for 126 yards and scored a touchdown. Quarterback Kinsmon Lancaster completed 13 of 23 passes for 116 yards, though two interceptions in A&M territory on consecutive drives in the second quarter prevented further Warhawk scoring opportunities. Overall, ULM gained 348 offensive yards.

Notable for this game is that, for the first time since facing Southwestern Louisiana in 1990, Texas A&M did not punt on any of its possessions, instead going for 4-for-4 on fourth downs.

=== Miami (FL) ===
	1	2	3	4	Total
#16 Texas A&M	0	0	0	17	17
Miami (FL)	7	17	7	3	34

This was the second-ever meeting between the Aggies and the Hurricanes. In their first meeting in 1944, the Aggies won 70–14 on the Hurricanes' home field to give the worst loss in Miami's football history. The Aggies have played at the Orange Bowl one other time in the 1944 Orange Bowl game, where they lost to LSU 14–19. It was also the Aggies' first trip to Florida since they lost 14–20 to Florida State in 1968. 1973 marks the last time the Hurricanes lost to a team from Texas at the Orange Bowl. The Hurricanes hold the NCAA record for consecutive home victories at the Orange Bowl from October 1985 to September 1994. They also hold a 31–20 all-time record against teams currently in the Big 12. The game will be the last nonconference game of the season for both teams. Two days prior to the game, Las Vegas casinos favored Miami to win by three points. In CBS Sports' weekly "Expert Picks", two reporters chose A&M to win, while three other reporters chose Miami.

After the Aggies' 237-yard passing game against Louisiana–Monroe the previous week, A&M ranked 107th nationally in pass offense, up from 115th. Offensively, A&M ranked fifth in rushing offense and 11th in scoring. A&M averaged six yards per play, and has rushed for 100 yards or more in 21 straight games. Thus far, the Aggie defense has allowed its opponents to gain a total of 697 passing yards and 453 rushing yards. Under head coach Dennis Franchione, the Aggies have not had much success in nonconference away games; A&M lost to #8 Virginia Tech in 2003, #19 Utah in 2004, and unranked Clemson in 2005. In 2006, the Aggies barely went away with a victory against unranked Army.

Miami came into the game with a 41st-ranked pass defense and a 113th pass offense, after averaging 130.7 passing yards per game. Though Miami won the 2002 BCS national championship and played in the 2003 national championship game, the 2007 Miami team has not mimicked their successful predecessors. In their second game of the season, the Hurricanes suffered a 13–51 defeat by #6 Oklahoma. In their next game against Florida International, the Hurricanes gained a total of 428 yards to win 23–9. At the time, Florida International ranked 117th out of 119 teams in scoring offense and 102nd in scoring defense. Though Miami have had a good rushing defense their previous season by holding 13 of their 16 opponents under 100 yards, Miami's last two opponents, FIU and OU, have passed the 100 yard mark.

In the game, the A&M offense suffered, despite having averaged more than 46 points and 444 yards in their previous three games. On 73 carries, quarterback Stephen McGee and running back Mike Goodson lost a total of 24 yards by being tackled behind the line. The offense lost a total of 27 yards to negative plays, which they had never made in the previous three games. Goodson himself lost one-yard on each of eight total carries. Stephen McGee completed 11 of 20 passes for only 109 yards, and rushed for just 39 yards on 16 carries. On A&M's opening drive, Goodson was tackled behind the line and lost 5 yards, McGee gained 2-yards, and then was sacked for a loss of 2 yards and a three-and-out. In the second quarter alone, A&M lost the ball three times on two fumbles and an interception, all within three minutes of game play. In the entire first half, the Aggies gained only 28 yards, including only 21 rushing yards, and trailed 0–24 at halftime.

A&M tailback Jorvorskie Lane only had two carries in the entire game—one in the third quarter and one in the fourth—for a total of 2 yards. When asked by reporters to explain why Jorvorskie did not receive the ball much, Stephen McGee responded, "They were doing such a good job up front, we had to try to get the ball on the perimeter and use our speed". A&M had not scored until 11:40 was left in the fourth quarter when kicker Matt Szymanski kicked a 32-yard field goal. The Aggies did not make their first touchdown drive until Miami freshman running back Graig Cooper fumbled the ball to the Aggies at the Miami 39. In the Aggies' second scoring drive, freshman redshirt quarterback Jerrod Johnson threw a 33-yard touchdown pass to tight end Martellus Bennett with five seconds remaining in the game. Jerrod Johnson took part in his fifth consecutive touchdown drive of his career. Overall, the Aggies could only gain 240 yards, including 98 rushing yards. The 98 rushing yards marked the first time in 22 games the Aggies were held to less than 100 yards; the last time was when A&M played unranked Colorado in 2005. A&M had not scored in the first three quarters of a game since the 2005 Cotton Bowl Classic, when A&M lost to unranked Tennessee 7–38.

Miami senior quarterback Kyle Wright threw for 275 yards and two touchdowns, and completed 21 of 26 passes. Receiver Sam Shields caught six passes for 117 yards. On their first 80-yard scoring drive itself, Kyle Wright threw for 61 yards, and freshman Graig Cooper ran for a 7-yard touchdown. Miami did not punt the ball until 13:07 remained in the third quarter. Overall, Miami compiled 402 offensive yards, including 262 passing. Miami had not scored as many points in a game against a ranked team since October 14, 2004, when Miami played #22 Louisville at the Orange Bowl.

=== Baylor ===
	1	2	3	4	Total
Baylor	3	0	0	7	10
Texas A&M	3	7	10	14	34

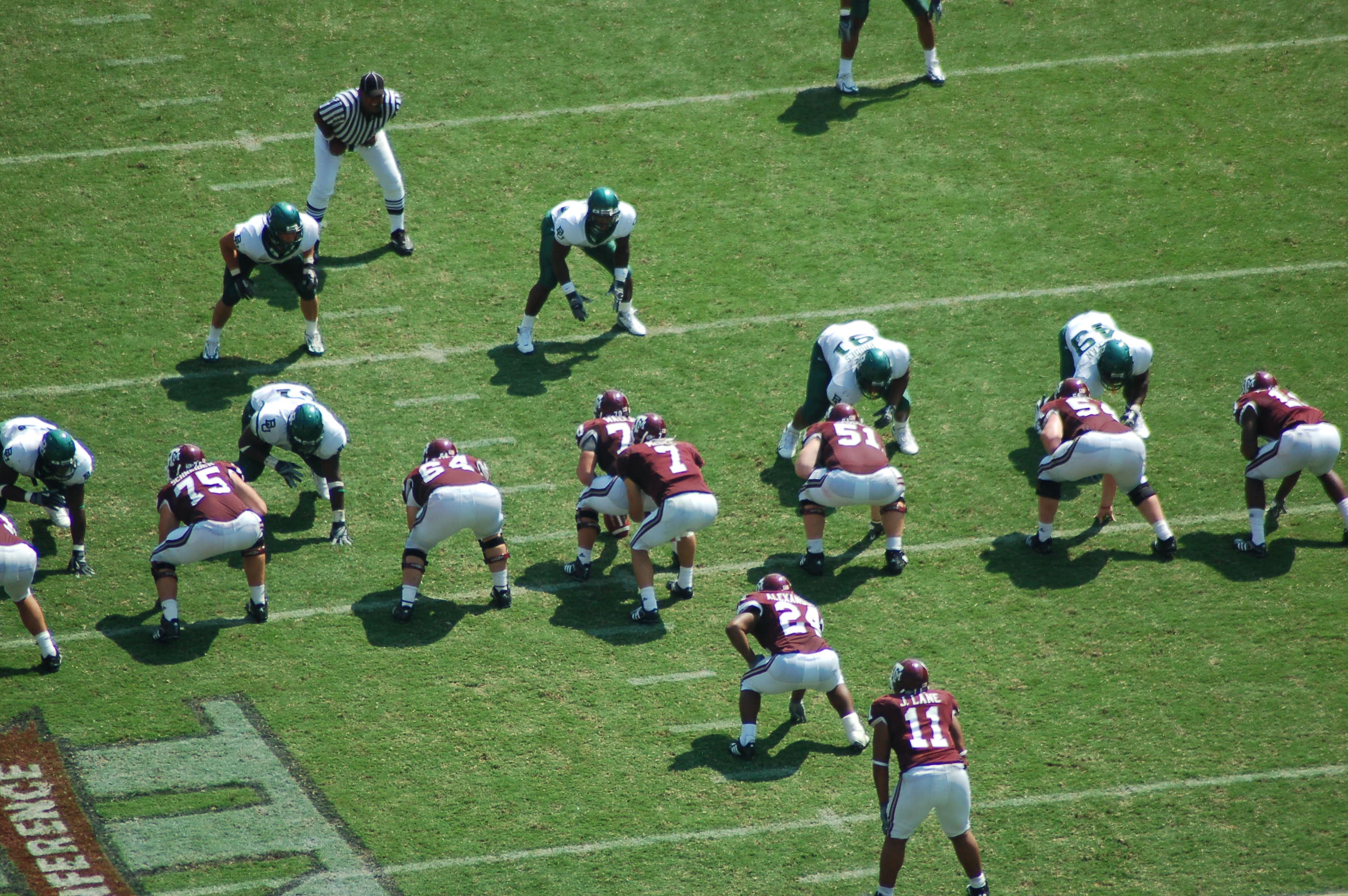
A&M in the I formation

This was the 104th Battle of the Brazos rivalry game between the Aggies and the Baylor Bears. Coming into the game, A&M had led the series 64–30–9. The Bears have never won a Big 12 opener away game, nor have they won at Kyle Field since a 20–16 victory in 1984. A&M currently leads the series 29–10–3 in games played at Kyle Field. This was the second time that the Bears and the Aggies met in September; in their first meeting, Baylor won 17–7 in 1979. The rivalry had been dormant from 1986 to 2003, as Baylor had not won a game since 1985. In 2004, however, an unranked Baylor team pulled off a 35–34 upset in overtime against the then #16 Aggies at Floyd Casey Stadium. In 2005, the rivalry again became bitter when A&M had to complete two fourth down conversions in order to win 16–13 in overtime at Kyle Field. In their previous meeting at Floyd Casey in 2006, the Aggies outscored the Bears 31–21. The Bears were led by head coach Guy Morriss, who has compiled a 1–3 record with A&M. A&M head coach Dennis Franchione came in with a 3–1 record with Baylor. Three days prior to the game, Las Vegas casinos favored A&M to win by 17 points. The College Football News staff picked A&M to win by an average of 16.5 points. A Waco Tribune-Herald columnist predicted that the Aggies would win 31–20.

The A&M secondary came into the game with a 62.9% completion rate, 243 passing yards, and 7.4 yards per attempt. Baylor quarterback Blake Szymanski had thrown for 1,211 yards and 14 touchdowns with 6 interceptions in the previous games of the season.

In the game, A&M possessed the ball for 43 minutes and the defense allowed only seven Baylor first downs. The Bears dropped 10 passes.

=== Oklahoma State ===
	1	2	3	4	Total
Oklahoma State	0	17	3	3	23
Texas A&M	0	0	10	14	24

This was the 23rd meeting between the Aggies and the Oklahoma State Cowboys. Coming into the game, A&M had led the series 16–6, and also led 7–3 in games played at Kyle Field. In their previous meeting at Boone Pickens Stadium in 2006, the Aggies defeated the Cowboys 34–33 in overtime, after A&M defensive lineman Red Bryant blocked kicker Jason Ricks' overtime field goal attempt that would have tied the game at 34–34 and created a second overtime.

Two days prior to the game, Las Vegas casinos favored A&M to win by 6.5 points. Three out of the four College Football News staff members predicted A&M to win by 6 points. WhatIfSports.com, which runs a computer simulation of a game 101 times and predicts the winner and score difference, predicted OSU to win.

Prior to the game, the Cowboys' rush offense ranked 8th, three spots behind the Aggies. The Cowboys' overall defense ranked 97th. The Cowboys' pass defense, however, ranked 117th, after allowing 342.6 passing yards and 53 pass attempts per game. OSU also ranked 106th nationally in the fewest penalties allowed, losing 76.4 yards per game, and 98th in turnover margin. Under Coach Mike Gundy, the Cowboys have compiled a 1–10 road game record.

A&M's rush offense ranked 5th nationally, after averaging 267.8 yards per game. A&M's pass offense, however, ranked 108th. Quarterback Stephen McGee had thrown for 737 yards, three touchdowns, and three interceptions coming into the game. McGee, however, led the Aggies in rushing with his 412 rushing yards.

In the first half, OSU wide receiver Adarius Bowman caught three passes for 108 yards and two touchdowns, including one for 47 yards that gave OSU the 14–0 lead. Cowboys kicker Jason Ricks, who had made only 2 of his 5 attempted field goals of the season, made a 32-yard field goal with 26 seconds left in the first half. He also scored OSU's only points in the second half, two field goals for 25 yards, one in the third quarter and one in the fourth. At the end of the first half, the Aggies trailed OSU 0–17. Notable for OSU is that, for the first time since 2004, the Cowboys made a first half shutout in a conference game.

In the second half, Jorvorskie Lane scored all of A&M's touchdowns. He rushed for two 1-yard touchdowns, and made his first receiving touchdown for 10 yards. Lane almost made a 50-yard touchdown pass to wide receiver Kerry Franks, but officials ruled that Franks' knee touched the ground at the 1-yard line. The receiving touchdown gave A&M a 24–20 lead with 8:03 left in the fourth quarter. Overall, Lane rushed for 77 yards on 19 carries. Early in the fourth quarter, two A&M defenders caused an injury to OSU's starting quarterback, Zac Robinson, which led OSU's junior redshirt quarterback Bobby Reid to replace him. Coincidentally, in their previous meeting in 2006, the A&M defense caused Reid to bench and Robinson to fill in. OSU elected to kick a field goal with 3:11 left in the game, bringing the score up to 23–24. OSU almost received the ball on an A&M punt with 1:46 left in the game, but safety Quinton Moore was flagged for roughing A&M punter Justin Brantly, giving A&M an automatic first down. A&M then ran out the clock to win 24–23.

The Aggies matched their largest comeback in school history, when A&M played Baylor in 1986 and overcame a 0–17 point deficit to win 31–30. The game's attendance of 86,217 became the sixth-largest in stadium history. The Aggies now had ranked No. 1 in the Big 12 South Division with an overall 5–1 record and a 2–0 conference record.

=== Texas Tech ===
	1	2	3	4	Total
Texas A&M	7	0	0	0	7
Texas Tech	0	21	0	14	35

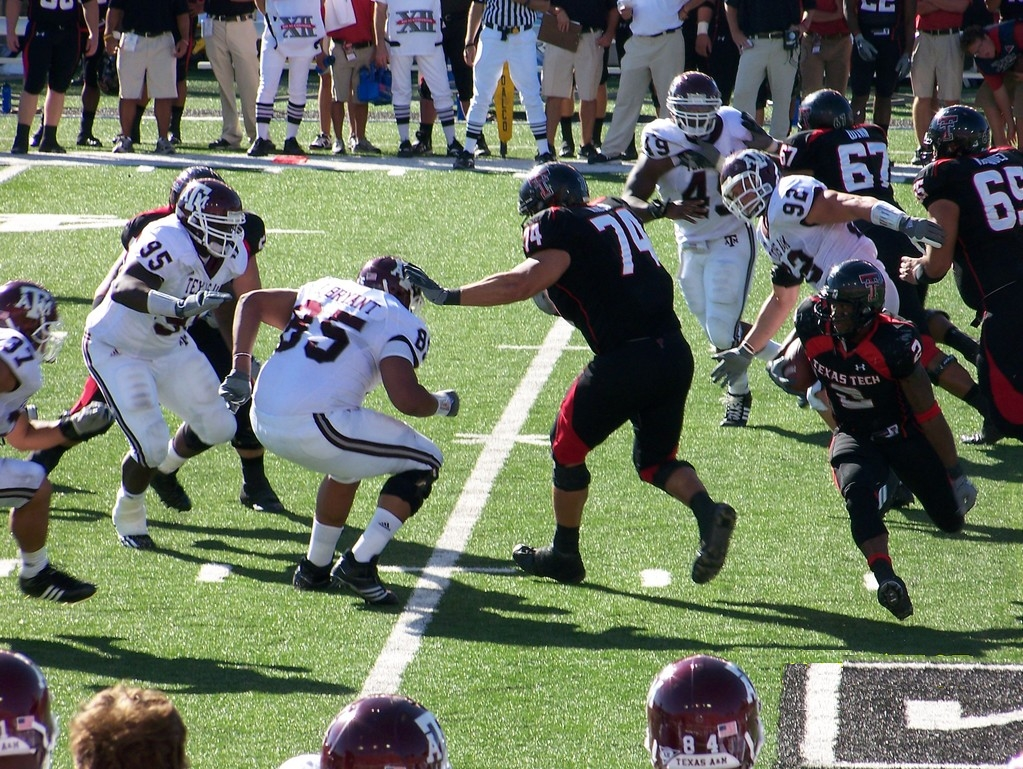
Texas A&M on defense against Texas Tech

This was the Aggies' 66th meeting with the Texas Tech Red Raiders. A&M came into the game leading the series 34–30–1, though 1993 had been the last time the Aggies won at Jones Stadium in Lubbock. In games played at Lubbock, Tech had led the series 16–12. Coach Dennis Franchione had a 1–3 record with Tech as A&M head coach, and Tech coach Mike Leach had a 5–2 record with A&M as Tech head coach. In their previous meeting at Kyle Field, the Raiders outscored the Aggies 31–27, after Tech sophomore quarterback Graham Harrell made a 37-yard touchdown pass with 26 seconds left in the game.

Two days prior to the game, Las Vegas casinos favored Tech to win by 8 points. The College Football News staff predicted Tech to win 45–31. In a press conference early into the week of the game, A&M running back Jorvorskie Lane, when told that A&M hadn't won a game in Lubbock since 1993, responded "We're going to win in 2007. That's a guarantee. I promise you." When Tech coach Mike Leach was confronted with Lane's statement, Leach expressed his indifference. Tech's interim defensive coordinator, Ruffin McNeill, however, respected Lane's statement. A&M defensive back Danny Gorrer stated that "[Tech wide receiver Michael Crabtree] got to bring his A-game when he faces Danny Gorrer". Gorrer ended up leaving the game with a torn anterior cruciate ligament that caused him to miss the rest of the season. A&M linebacker Mark Dodge stated that last year's game was "just a fluke" and expressed his desire to perform well against Tech.

Coming into the game, the Raiders had led the nation in total offense (590.2 yards) and passing offense (513 yards). They were also second in scoring offense with their 52.5 points per game. Tech quarterback Graham Harrell was ranked No. 1 in the nation after compiling 450.2 yards per game, 38 completions per game, and 454.3 passing yards per game this season. Harrell compiled a 73.5 pass completion rate, and had thrown for 28 touchdowns and only three interceptions. Wide receiver Michael Crabtree had led the nation in receptions (70 for 11.67 yards per game) and receiving (1,074 for 179 yards per game). He is also the Division I freshman touchdown record holder for a season, after scoring 17 points per game. Crabtree's 1,074 reception yards were more than A&M's team total of 1,005. The Raiders' pass defense ranked 20th, their rush defense ranked 59th after allowing 152 yards per game, and their rush offense was ranked 113th, after rushing only 77.2 yards per game. The Raiders' overall defense ranked 36th, after allowing 338 yards per game.

A&M came into the game with a 7th-ranked rush offense, after rushing for 248 yards per game. A&M's leading rushers, Mike Goodson, Jorvorskie Lane, and Stephen McGee, had compiled 363 yards on 75 carries, 397 yards on 89 carries, and 455 yards on 71 carries, respectively. A&M's pass defense ranked 75th, after allowing 237.5 passing yards per game. The Aggies' defense ranked 63rd after allowing 377.5 yards per game.

=== Nebraska ===
	1	2	3	4	Total
Texas A&M	9	7	14	6	36
Nebraska	7	7	0	0	14

This was the Aggies' 13th meeting with the Nebraska Cornhuskers. Coming into the game, Nebraska had led the series 2–10, ever since it began in 1930. Texas A&M had only won the 1955 game in Lincoln, and the 1998 game in College Station. Since the 1998 game, the Cornhuskers have outscored the Aggies by an average of 20 points per game. During the Franchione era, the Aggies had played the Cornhuskers twice, and had lost both times by a combined total of 8 points. Nebraska head coach Bill Callahan entered the 2007 season as a third-year head coach with an 18–15 record and a Big 12 North title. Callahan had led his team to a 4–3 season record, including a homecoming loss to Oklahoma State. The loss to Oklahoma State became the worst home loss for Nebraska since 1958 and prompted Nebraska officials to fire athletic director Steve Pederson. One day prior to the game, Las Vegas casinos favored Nebraska to win by 2 points.

Coming into the game, A&M ranked 109th nationally in passing offense, after compiling 162.2 passing yards per game. Stephen McGee was the Aggies' leading rusher at the time, after compiling 544 rushing yards. A&M's rushing offense ranked 7th nationally, after rushing 246 yards per game. The pass defense ranked 99th nationally, and overall defense ranked 74th. Tight end Martellus Bennett and offensive lineman Chris Yoder did not travel to Lincoln due to injuries, and cornerback Jordan Peterson did not play due to an injury. Nebraska entered the game with an offense that ranked 38th nationally, and a passing offense that ranked 27th. Nebraska's rush defense ranked 106th, after allowing opponents to rush an average of 208.5 yards per game. Nebraska's total defense ranked 108th.

In the game, A&M quarterback Stephen McGee rushed for 167 yards on 35 carries, both career-highs, and completed 13 of 22 passes for 100 yards. McGee's 35 carries broke the A&M record for carries by a quarterback of 27, which was set in 1977. A&M running back Jorvorskie Lane rushed for 130 yards and four touchdowns, bringing his career rushing touchdown total to 43 and becoming the Aggies' second all-time leading touchdown rusher. Lane also made carries of 22, 27, and 31 yards, which became his three longest runs thus far this season. Nebraska had lost all three of their fumbles, one of which that led A&M to a 16–7 lead in the second quarter. In the third quarter, both Lane and McGee teamed up on two consecutive 80–yard touchdown drives against the wind, giving A&M a 30–14 lead. Overall, the offense compiled a total of 459 yards with no turnovers, and 359 rushing yards, the most in a road game since 1996. After the game, Nebraska had been outscored 122–34 in their losses to Missouri, Oklahoma State, and A&M.

=== Kansas ===
	1	2	3	4	Total
#10 Kansas	0	0	13	6	19
Texas A&M	0	0	0	11	11

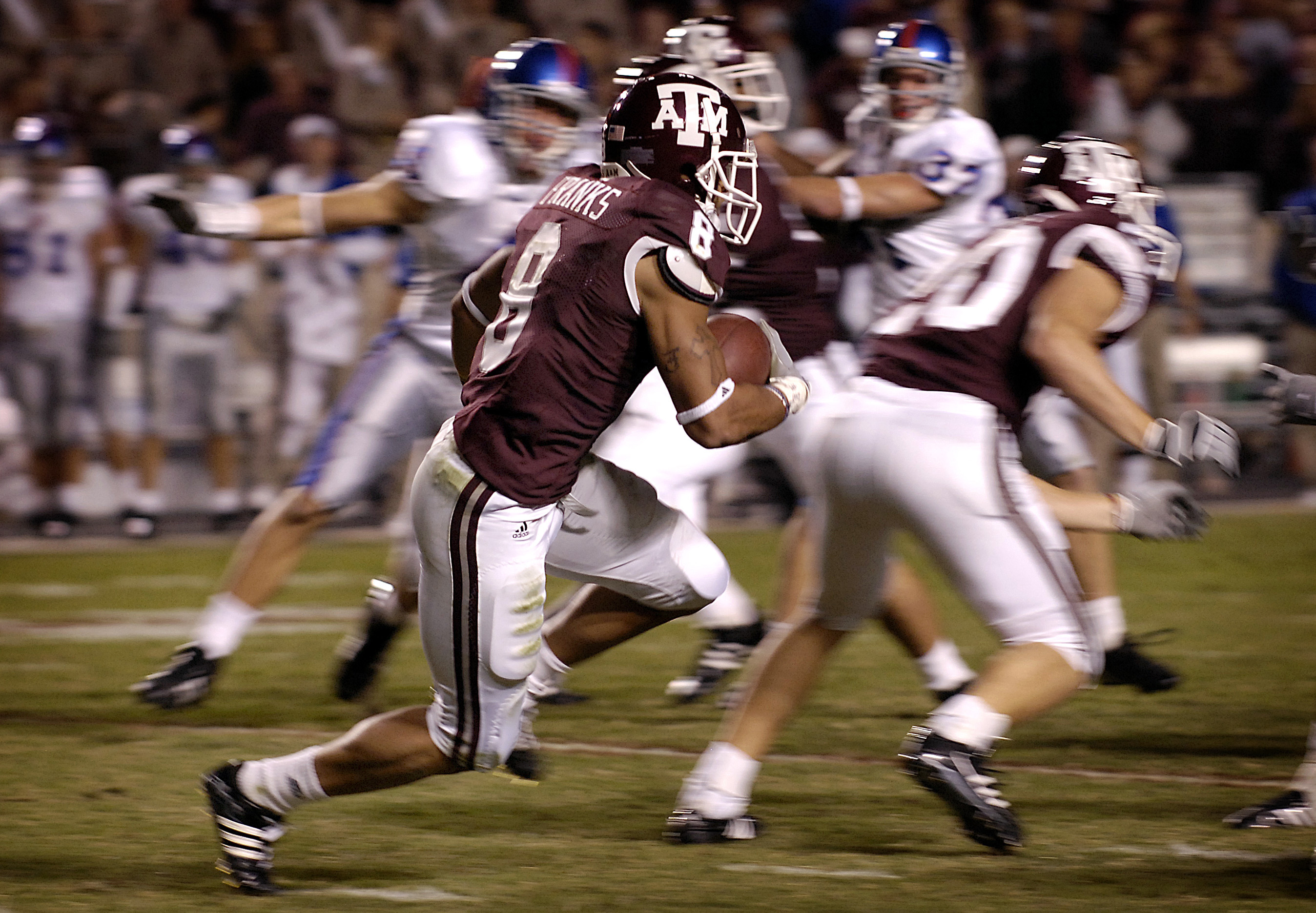
Kerry Franks (#8) carries the ball

This was the Aggies' 9th meeting with the ranked Kansas Jayhawks. A&M entered the game leading the series 7–1, and had only lost the first meeting in Lawrence in 1974. Kansas was the only Big 12 team that A&M was undefeated against, ever since the Big 12 formed in 1996. Kansas was the first top 10 team, excluding Oklahoma and Texas, to play at Kyle Field since 2002. A&M had compiled a 6–3 record for games played against top 10 teams (other than OU and Texas) at Kyle Field. In their previous meeting in 2006, A&M outscored Kansas 21–18. One day prior to the game, Las Vegas casinos favored Kansas to win by three points. In CBS Sports' weekly "Expert Picks", four out of the five reporters chose A&M to win.

A&M came into the game with a 5th-ranked rushing offense, and a 111th ranked passing offense. The pass defense ranked 100th, scoring defense ranked 42nd, and overall defense ranked 73rd. Kansas entered the game with a 16th-ranked rushing offense, 25th-ranked passing offense, and a 3rd-ranked scoring offense. Kansas' rushing defense ranked 4th, pass defense ranked 10th, and overall defense ranked 5th. Kansas also had ranked 9th in the weekly BCS standings.

In the game, the KU defense held A&M's 5th-ranked rushing offense to only 79 yards. The A&M defense allowed KU running back Brandon McAnderson to rush for a career-high of 183 yards and score two touchdowns. The game remained scoreless until the third quarter, when KU gained a total of 13 points by kicking two field goals and scoring one touchdown. In the third quarter alone, the A&M offense compiled -9 yards on 9 plays. In the fourth quarter, KU scored another touchdown to earn a 19-point lead. A&M had almost gotten its first home shutout since 1971, until Matt Szymanski kicked a field goal with 7:20 left in the game. With 2:06 left, quarterback Stephen McGee threw a 32-yard touchdown pass to freshman receiver Roger Holland and completed a two-point conversion to bring the score up to 19–11. On the last two plays of the game, however, McGee attempted hail Mary passes, but failed both times.

=== Oklahoma ===
	1	2	3	4	Total
Texas A&M	0	0	0	14	14
#5 Oklahoma	7	14	14	7	42

This was the Aggies' 26th meeting with the Oklahoma Sooners. The Sooners entered the game leading the series 10–15 and also leading 11–1 in games played at Norman. Coach Dennis Franchione had compiled a 0–4 record with OU as A&M head coach, and coach Bob Stoops had compiled a 7–1 record with A&M as OU head coach. In 2003, A&M suffered its worst loss in school history when OU shutout A&M 77–0 at Norman. In their last meeting, the #21 Aggies lost to the #18 Sooners 17–16. In addition, A&M running back Mike Goodson ran for a career record of 127 yards against the Sooners tough run defense last year. The Sooners came off of a bye week to play A&M. During his tenure at OU, Stoops had compiled a 7–1 record in games played directly after a bye week. In CBS Sports' weekly "Expert Picks", all five reporters chose OU to win. Two days prior to the game, oddsmakers favored OU to win by 21 points.

A&M entered the game with a 9th-ranked rushing offense, 109th passing offense, and 48th scoring offense. A&M's scoring defense ranked 40th, pass defense 89th, and overall defense ranked 76th. OU had led the Big 12 with its 2nd-ranked scoring offense and 3rd-ranked rushing defense. OU had also led the Big 12 with its 2nd-ranked passing efficiency, 8th-ranked sack total, and 5th-ranked tackles for loss total.

In the game, OU tight end Jermaine Gresham matched a school record after he caught four receiving touchdowns in the first three quarters. Quarterback Sam Bradford made 284 passing yards and five touchdowns. A&M fumbles in the first half, one by receiver Roger Holland and the other by running back Keondra Smith, led to OU touchdown drives. The OU offense gained a total of 470 yards. A&M running back Mike Goodson, who was suspended the first half after missing a practice earlier in the week, rushed for a total of 28 yards on 7 carries. Quarterback Stephen McGee compiled 155 passing yards after completing 15 of 28 passes. Overall, the Aggies gained only 283 offensive yards, 152 of which came from the final two drives of the game. The Aggies did not convert a single third down. A&M tight end Martellus Bennett broke a school record of 26 consecutive games with receptions after he caught a team-high of four passes.

=== Missouri ===
	1	2	3	4	Total
Texas A&M	2	7	10	7	26
#7 Missouri	7	17	0	16	40

This was the Aggies' 10th meeting with the Missouri Tigers. A&M entered the game leading the series 7–2. In the 2006 game at Kyle Field, the unranked Aggies defeated #19 Missouri 25–19.

=== Texas ===
	1	2	3	4	Total
#13 Texas	0	3	14	13	30
Texas A&M	10	7	7	14	38

This game marked the 114th meeting between the Aggies and the Texas Longhorns and was the fourth year as part of a multi-sport rivalry called the Lone Star Showdown. The football rivalry began in 1894 and continues to be the longest-running rivalry for both the Longhorns and the Aggies; it is the third most-played rivalry in Division I-A college football. Texas A&M comes into the 2007 contest with a 35–73–5 record. Since the series began in 1894, the game has traditionally been played on Thanksgiving Day or Thanksgiving weekend. The 2007 game marks the fourteenth straight game to be scheduled the day after Thanksgiving.

The 2005 UT game was the poorest performance of that season by the Longhorns, both offensively and defensively. On offense, Vince Young had only 162 yards of offense, his lowest output of the season. UT running backs Henry Melton and Ramonce Taylor also received criticism for their tendency to run side-to-side instead of down-field. On defense, the Longhorns held A&M to only 118 yards passing but gave up 277 yards rushing; the highest allowed by the Longhorns all season.

The 2006 meeting was the first time in eight years that both teams entered the game with at least eight wins coming into the match-up. A&M prevailed 12–7 over the Longhorns in Austin, Texas, rushing for 244 yards against the nation's then-top-ranked rush defense.

As a result of a tragic accident in 1999, the Aggies could no longer hold a school sponsored version of their traditional Bonfire but the unofficial "Student Bonfire" was lit on the evening of 20 November 2007. Texas A&M also hosted its annual Maroon Out on game day. During the week before the game, the Longhorns held their traditional Hex Rally.

The game kicked off and the Aggies Quickly scored a 35-yard touchdown with a screen pass from Stephen McGee to Mike Goodson on their opening drive to go up by seven points. The Longhorns mustered two first downs, but could not get any points and punted. Texas A&M likewise ended their subsequent drive three plays later with a punt of their own. The Longhorn team again successfully penetrated into Texas A&M territory, but Mack Brown opted to call a pooch punt by Colt McCoy on fourth down and four from the Aggie 37. The Aggies answered with an eighteen-play drive that stalled on the 14-yard line and the Aggies had to settle for a 31-yard field goal by Matt Szymanski.

The second quarter started with the Longhorns driving only six yards and being forced to punt again. The Aggies continued to press their advantage and drove down the field until Stephen McGee threw an ill-timed pass that was intercepted by Deon Beasley at the Longhorn 25. Two first-downs later, Texas was forced to punt and pinned Texas A&M on their own five-yard line. Stephen McGee led the offense with several long passes and the Aggies drove to the Texas 5 but again were held short on 3rd down. On 4th and three, the Aggies faked the field goal and the placeholder, T.J. Sanders, ran the ball in for his first touchdown giving the Aggies a 17–0 lead. The Longhorns started their next drive on their own 20 where Colt McCoy threw a pass to Jamaal Charles that went 62 yards. The drive stalled and the Longhorns had to settle for a field goal and went to halftime trailing their archrival 17–3.

The third quarter started with promising drives by both teams that ended when the ball was intercepted. Brandon Foster ran the Longhorn interception back to the A&M 8 yard line and Texas scored a touchdown on the next play to pull the Longhorns within seven points. The Aggies drove to the Texas 34 yard line, but the drive stalled out and Texas took over on downs as the fourth down attempt failed. Colt McCoy fumbled a few plays later to give the ball back to Texas A&M. Five plays later, Stephen McGee scampered into the endzone for a five-yard touchdown to put the Aggies up 24–10. The Longhorns took little time to answer with a touchdown of their own. Quan Cosby returned the following kickoff 91 yards for a touchdown to pull Texas within seven once again. The next drive started on the Aggie 49, courtesy of a 42-yard kickoff return by E. J. Shankle that nearly went for a touchdown. The quarter ended on a seven-yard pass to Mike Goodson.

The final quarter of play began with Stephen McGee and Mike Goodson picking up where they left off: Stephen McGee threw a 44-yard pass to Mike Goodson for another touchdown to put the Aggies ahead by a score of 31–17. The Longhorns again went three and out and were forced to punt. The Aggies went down the field quickly and scored yet another touchdown with a 66-yard pass completion to Earvin Taylor to put Texas A&M up by 21 points. Colt McCoy fumbled the ball two plays later but A&M was forced to punt the ball away 3 plays later. McCoy and the Longhorn offense drove the length of the field and answered with 2 passes for over 25 yards and a touchdown taking only 99 seconds off the clock. The Aggies lost seven yards over the next 3 plays and were forced again to punt. The Longhorns drove 73 yards from their own 27, converted two fourth downs, and scored another touchdown. Ryan Bailey missed the extra point but left the Longhorns only down by 8 points. The Aggies took possession on their own 33 and ran the clock out to win the game 38–30.

During the postgame celebration, ABC commentator Jack Arute asked Coach Franchione for his thoughts on the A&M coaching situation. Coach Franchione responded by asking the announcer to let the players enjoy their victory. At the beginning of the subsequent press conference, Coach Franchione announced his resignation effective immediately. Shortly thereafter, Texas A&M announced that defensive coordinator Gary Darnell would lead the Aggies in the bowl game.

=== Alamo Bowl vs. Penn State ===
	1	2	3	4	Total
Penn State	0	17	7	0	24
Texas A&M	14	0	3	0	17

The Aggies were picked to play the Penn State Nittany Lions, who finished 8–4 in their regular season.

Three Aggie players missed the game due to injuries, including offensive lineman Chris Yoder, cornerback Jordan Peterson, and defensive lineman Chris Smith. Defensive end Michael Bennett also cannot make the game due to his academic ineligibility. College Football News predicts a 34–20 victory for Penn State. WhatIfSports.com simulated the game 1,001 times and predicts the same result with a lower score, Penn State 29, Texas A&M 17.

== After the season ==
In the 2008 NFL draft, five Aggies were drafted, including Martellus Bennett in the second round by the Dallas Cowboys, Cody Wallace and Red Bryant in the fourth round by the San Francisco 49ers and Seattle Seahawks, respectively, Chris Harrington in the sixth round by the Arizona Cardinals, and Corey Clark in the seventh round by the San Diego Chargers.
