= St. Pius X High School (Houston) =

Location
- 811 W. Donovan Street; Houston, Texas 77091; United States

Information
- Other name: SPX
- Type: Private, co-educational
- Motto: Veritas (Truth)
- Religious affiliation: Roman Catholic (Dominican)
- Established: 1956, Dominican Sisters of Houston
- Oversight: Dominican Veritas Ministries (since 2023)
- Principal: Rachel Ware
- President: John W. Bates, V
- Grades: 9–12
- Enrollment: 655 (2024–2025)
- Campus type: Urban
- Colors: Black, white, gray, and orange
- Athletics: TAPPS
- Mascot: Beppo the Panther
- Team name: Panthers
- Yearbook: Del Sarto
- Website: www.stpiusx.org

St. Pius X High School (SPX) is a private, co-educational Roman Catholic college-preparatory high school in Houston, Texas. It was founded in 1956 by the Dominican Sisters of Houston and is rooted in the Dominican charism of Veritas (“Truth”). In 2023, canonical sponsorship transferred to Dominican Veritas Ministries, a pontifical public juridic person established to sustain Dominican secondary schools in the United States.

SPX is accredited by the Texas Catholic Conference of Bishops Education Department and Cognia (SACS CASI), and it is a member of the Texas Association of Private and Parochial Schools (TAPPS). The school serves students in grades 9–12 on its Northwest Houston campus, where programming integrates the Dominican Four Pillars of Prayer, Study, Community, and Preaching.

== History ==
St. Pius X High School was founded in 1956 by the Dominican Sisters of Houston with the support of the Diocese of Galveston–Houston (now the Archdiocese). The school opened in September 1956 with ninth- and tenth-grade students and grew into a four-year high school by 1958.

On September 1, 2023, the Dominican Sisters of Houston joined four other Dominican congregations in activating Dominican Veritas Ministries (DVM) and transferring sponsorship of nine schools, including St. Pius X High School, to the new PJP.

== Campus ==
The school is located at 811 W. Donovan Street in northwest Houston (ZIP 77091).

== Academics ==
SPX offers a college-preparatory curriculum and is a non-ranking high school. In 2024–2025 the school implemented an eight-day rotating block schedule and moved to a one-to-one, school-sponsored laptop program to support a cohesive learning environment. Students complete Christian service learning as part of graduation requirements.

== Student life and ministry ==
The school’s Dominican identity emphasizes the Four Pillars—Prayer, Study, Community, and Preaching—which are integrated into academics and co-curricular programs.

== Athletics ==
St. Pius X competes in TAPPS athletics as the Panthers. In 2017 the school renamed its football venue Kubiak Stadium in honor of alumnus and NFL coach Gary Kubiak; his jersey No. 9 was retired at the dedication ceremony.

== Traditions and identity ==
The mascot, Beppo the Panther—named for Pope Pius X’s nickname “Beppo”—and the school’s colors (black, white, gray, and orange) were refreshed in a 2016 branding update. The annual yearbook is titled Del Sarto.

== Notable alumni ==
- Justin Anderson (Class of 2011) – MLB baseball player for the Los Angeles Angels
- Tony Braunagel (Class of 1967) – musician
- Norman F. Carnahan (Class of 1960) – American chemical engineer and scientist
- Chris Harrington (Class of 2003) – Former NFL linebacker
- Jackson Hurst (Class of 1997) – actor
- Gary Kubiak (Class of 1979) – Former NFL quarterback and head coach
- Gary Majewski (Class of 1998) – Former MLB relief pitcher
- Alex Morono (Class of 2008) - Mixed Martial Arts Fighter
- Kohl Stewart (Class of 2013) – MLB baseball player for the Minnesota Twins
