= Aliceville Elementary and High School =

- U.S. National Register of Historic Places
- Location within Alabama Location within the United States
- Location: 420 3rd Ave., NE, Aliceville, Alabama
- Coordinates: 33°7′44″N 88°8′49″W
- Area: less than one acre
- Built: 1913
- Architectural style: Mixed
- NRHP reference No.: 80000734
- Added to NRHP: May 9, 1980

Aliceville Elementary and High School, also known as the Millionaire Public School, is a historic school building in Aliceville, Alabama. It was completed in 1913 and opened as the Aliceville Public School with 130 students and six teachers. It became the Aliceville Elementary School in 1929, when a separate building was built for the high school. It was extensively remodeled in 1934, which included the removal of the second story. It continued to house the elementary school until 1954. It served various purposes after that, including housing the library and county health department. The school was listed on the National Register of Historic Places on May 9, 1980.
