= Stephen Fleck =

American psychiatrist and academic (1912–2002)

Stephen Fleck (September 18, 1912 – December 19, 2002) was a professor in the psychiatry, epidemiology and public health departments at the Yale University School of Medicine from 1953 to 1983 and professor emeritus from 1983 until his death.

He had an early effect on the direction that American psychiatry took during the mid- to late-twentieth century. With Theodore Lidz and Alice Cornelison, he was a co-author of the seminal book Schizophrenia and the Family (1965), a significant influence on the modern psychiatric thought and practice regarding the origins and treatments of schizophrenia.

== Early life ==
One of four sons and one daughter born in Frankfurt, Germany, to Georg and Anna Fleck, he was a young medical student in 1933 when a professor warned him and several other Jewish students that there were Nazi warrants out for their arrests. Fleck and most of his immediate family fled Hitler's Germany, first to The Netherlands and then, in 1935, to Boston, Massachusetts, where he became a U.S. citizen.

He finished medical school at Harvard, where he was a graduate assistant to John Rock while Rock was performing the preliminary research that led to the invention of the first birth control pill. This helped to spark Fleck's lifelong interest in contraception and family planning issues.

== Military service ==
In 1941, Fleck enlisted in the U.S. Army Medical Corps and rose to the rank of captain. He was first stationed as a medical officer at Camp Aliceville, a U.S. Army Prisoner of War Camp at Aliceville, Alabama, where he was involved in treating a diphtheria epidemic that spread quickly among the prisoners. Among the Nazi prisoners were a number of Rommel Corps soldiers, some of whom, even while incarcerated in west central Alabama, attempted to assassinate other Nazis they saw as having been disloyal to the Third Reich. Since Fleck kept his national origin and fluency in German secret from the prisoners, he was able to prevent some of these plotted murders.

He was subsequently shipped to the European Theater, and first posted in England in Army camp hospitals. Just before D-Day, Fleck was posted to Bournemouth, England, to await transport over the channel with the medical (ambulance) corps. While in Bournemouth, he met Louise Harlan, an American Red Cross volunteer. Fleck stayed with ambulance corps attached to the 72nd and 76th Divisions as they moved through Belgium. He was present at the Battle of the Bulge and afterward was briefly in charge of the medical needs of some 30,000 captured German soldiers. Subsequently, he was involved in interrogating POWs and evacuating and treating concentration camp prisoners; he also traveled to several camps to search for records or other signs of surviving friends and extended family.

== Early medical career ==
Fleck and Harlan were shipped home in August and September 1945; they were married on October 13, 1945. Fleck did his psychiatric residency at Johns Hopkins Hospital in Baltimore, Maryland, where he first met his lifelong colleague Theodore Lidz. He had a faculty position at the University of Washington School of Medicine from 1949 until 1953, when Lidz invited Fleck to join him at the Yale School of Medicine Department of Psychiatry.

== Career at Yale ==
Fleck and Lidz "worked from the late 1940s on to change the direction of psychiatry from the purely psychoanalytic to a specialty incorporating social-scientific methodology, medical, behavioral, neurological and public-health factors, and especially familial considerations." They focused their long-term research on patients with schizophrenia and their families, culminating in the 1966 publication of the ground-breaking Schizophrenia and the Family, for which Lidz, Fleck and Cornelison won the 1985 American Family Therapy Academy "Pioneering Contribution to Family Therapy" award. In addition to his research, professorial, and supervisory roles at the school of medicine, Fleck was also chief psychiatrist at both the Yale Psychiatric Institute and the Connecticut Mental Health Center.

Fleck officially retired from Yale in 1983 but continued to publish and to consult on colleagues' cases until a few months before his 2002 death. The Stephen Fleck Clinician and Teacher Award at the Yale School of Medicine is named in his honor.

== Personal life ==
The Flecks had three children in quick succession: Anna Lou (b. 1947), Stephen Harlan (b. 1948), and Carra Ruth (b. 1949). Together, the Flecks were campaigners for legalized birth control and abortion, participating in the activism that led to the landmark 1965 Supreme Court decision Griswold v. Connecticut. Louise Fleck had grown up in Nome, Alaska among other places, and had traveled and worked internationally before and after World War II receiving a BA (honors) in Spanish from the University of Washington. In New Haven, she became active in public school issues, and acquired an MAT-Reading. She tutored many illiterate adults, generally without fee. She and Stephen were married for almost 50 years until her death in 1992.

== Partial list of published works ==
- Fleck, Stephen; Kellam, John W.; Klippen, Arthur J. (March 1944). "Diphtheria Among German Prisoners of War". Bulletin of the United States Army Medical Department (74): 80–89.
- Fleck, Stephen (June 1956). "Role of the Public Health Nurse in Mental Health—Part I: Nurses' Training in Mental Health Aspects of Public Health Field Work". American Journal of Public Health and the Nation's Health. 46 (6): 748–754. doi:10.2105/ajph.46.6.748. PMC 1623783. PMID 13327108.
- Lidz, Theodore; Cornelison, Alice; Fleck, Stephen; Terry, Dorothy (1957). "The interfamilial environment of the schizophrenic patient I: The father". Psychiatry. 20 (4): 329–342. doi:10.1080/00332747.1957.11023099. PMID 13494602.
- Lidz, Theodore; Fleck, Stephen; Cornelison, Alice (1965). Schizophrenia and the Family. International Universities Press. ISBN 082366001X.
- Fleck, Stephen (1971). "'Interracial Riots' in School and Community Indifference". The School Review. 79 (4). The University of Chicago Press: 614–623. doi:10.1086/443004. S2CID 143554701.
- Strauss, John S.; Bowers, Malcolm; Downey, T. Wayne; Fleck, Stephen; Jackson, Stanley; Levine, Ira, eds. (1980). The Psychotherapy of Schizophrenia (Plenum).
- Pruett, Kyle Dean; Fleck, Stephen (1984). Familial Developmental Lines: Anna Freud's Concept of Developmental Lines and Family Dynamics. American Academy of Child Psychiatry Annual Meeting. Toronto, Canada.
- Fleck, Stephen (May 2000). "Review of The Art of Psychotherapy: Case Studies From the Family Therapy Networker, edited by Richard Simon, et al. (New York, John Wiley & Sons, 1999)". The American Journal of Psychiatry. 157: 846. doi:10.1176/appi.ajp.157.5.846.
