= Camp Aliceville =

World War II POW camp in the Alabama, United States

Coordinates: 33.1172°N 88.1734°W

Camp Aliceville was a World War II era prisoner of war (POW) camp in Aliceville, Alabama. Its construction began in August 1942, it received its first prisoners in June 1943, and it shut down in September 1945. It was the largest World War II POW camp in the Southeastern United States, holding between 2,000 and 12,000 German prisoners at any one time.

== History ==
Advertisement which ran on March 20, 1947 in the Tuscaloosa News, placed by the War Assets Administration soliciting bids on the dismantled parts of Camp Aliceville

The construction of Camp Aliceville began in August 1942 and was completed by December. The camp began receiving German POWs, at first mostly from Erwin Rommel's Afrika Corps, in June 1943. It comprised 400 wood-frame barracks, which could hold as many as 6,000 prisoners and 900 Army personnel. Aliceville was the largest of the eleven POW camps in the Southeastern U.S. By the end of the war Camp Aliceville held German prisoners captured in many different locations. It closed on September 30, 1945. The camp was dismantled and sold for scrap after the war, and its only remaining trace is an old stone chimney.

== Camp life ==
Heimweh
(Homesickness)

Wenn die hohe Alabamasonne
Ihre Strahlen niedersendet,
Ist sie niemals jene Sonne
Die uns Lust und Liebe spendet.

When the high Alabama sun
Sends down its rays,
It is never that sun
That bestows on us pleasure and love.

— Helmut Thieme, a German POW interned at Aliceville, published January 1945 in Der Zaungast

Prisoners at Camp Aliceville created a rich cultural life in the camp, which included musical groups, theatre productions, and a camp newspaper called Der Zaungast,^{(α)} one of 80 local POW camp newspapers. Aliceville camp authorities held landscaping contests, to which the prisoners responded enthusiastically, creating spectacular topiary and intricately designed flower gardens. College level classes, English being the most popular, were taught to prisoners by faculty from the University of Alabama in Tuscaloosa. Prisoners could arrange for transcripts of courses they'd taken to be sent to the Reich Ministry of Education in Germany, which would award them academic credit for their work.

According to Randy Wall, "fewer than 10 percent of all German POWs were devoted Nazis." In many American POW camps, including Aliceville, these prisoners harassed, injured, or killed prisoners who they thought had become too comfortable with their American captors. Camp Aliceville doctor Stephen Fleck said that "Most of [the murders] were accomplished with bare hands or some cooking utensil...they cold-bloodedly killed either with knives or strangling during the night. We probably had two or three such deaths a month...anybody whom they suspected of wavering in his Nazi enthusiasm. Nobody would squeal, because the squealer would likely meet a similar fate." To protect prisoners from such violence, American military authorities established a number of so-called "segregation camps," to which "ardent Nazis" could be sent. Although it began as an ordinary POW camp, by 1944 Aliceville had become a segregation camp itself.

There were over 2000 escape attempts made by German POWs held in American camps during the war, and Aliceville was no exception. One group of six prisoners at Aliceville made it as far as Memphis, Tennessee, where they were captured by the FBI after stealing a car.

Prisoners at Camp Aliceville were treated humanely, partly because the United States government hoped that the German government would reciprocate in its treatment of American prisoners of war. The fact that American neighbors of the camp were experiencing shortages of goods and mandatory rationing of many necessities led to some hard feelings against the prisoners.

== Present ==
The Aliceville POW Museum, which hosts "what is said to be the largest collection of World War II POW memorabilia in the United States," houses papers, letters, documents, maps, and other material from Camp Aliceville and other POW camps.

The museum hosted reunions of prisoners and guards in 1989, 1995, and 2007.

== See also ==
- Georg Gärtner
- List of World War II prisoner-of-war camps in the United States

== Notes ==
^α According to historian Chip Walker, "Der Zaungast is an untranslatable German term. It conveys the image of someone looking through a peephole in a fence or down from a tree into activities nearby but separated from the viewer. In colloquial German it means 'goof-off' or 'loafer.' For the prisoners it held the additional meaning of 'fence-guest' or 'guest behind the fence.'"
