= Les Koenning =

American football player and coach (born 1959)

Biographical details
- Born: February 10, 1959 (age 67); San Antonio, Texas, U.S.

Playing career
- 1977–1980: Texas
- Position: Wide receiver

Coaching career (HC unless noted)
- 1981–1983: Texas (GA)
- 1984: Alabama (GA)
- 1985: Southwestern Louisiana (WR/RC)
- 1986–1989: Mississippi State (RB/WR)
- 1990–1993: Rice (WR)
- 1993: Duke (WR)
- 1994–1996: Texas A&M (WR)
- 1997: Miami Dolphins (off. assistant)
- 1998: Duke (OC/QB)
- 1999: Houston (OC/QB)
- 2000: TCU (PGC/QB)
- 2001–2002: Alabama (OC/QB)
- 2003–2007: Texas A&M (OC/QB)
- 2008: South Alabama (OC/QB)
- 2009–2013: Mississippi State (OC/QB)
- 2014: Texas (WR)
- 2016–2017: UAB (OC/QB)
- 2018: Southern Miss (RB)
- 2019: Kansas (OC)

Les Koenning Jr. (born February 10, 1959) is an American football coach. During his career, he served as offensive coordinator for Duke, Houston, Alabama, Texas A&M, South Alabama, Mississippi State, Texas, UAB, and Kansas. He retired in 2020.

== Playing career ==
Koenning played high school football for his father Les Koenning Sr., who was a longtime Texas high school and college coach, at Memorial High School outside of Houston and went to play for Texas in 1977. He was recruited to play quarterback by Darrell Royal at the University of Texas but ended up playing Wide Receiver. In 1980 he was a team Captain and led the Longhorns in receiving yards. He went on to get his Masters and was a graduate assistant.

== Coaching career ==
Koenning began his career with graduate assistantships at Texas and Alabama before being named wide receivers coach and recruiting coordinator at Louisiana-Lafayette in 1985.

He then went to Mississippi State in 1986 where he spent 3 seasons as the running backs/wide receivers coach. He spent the next several years as a wide receivers coach, first at Rice from 1990 to 1993; then to Duke where he finished the 1993 season and then at Texas A&M from 1994 to 1996.

He then spent one season in the NFL as an offensive assistant with the Miami Dolphins.

He returned to college football the next year and became an offensive coordinator; first returning to Duke in 1998 and then going to Houston in 1999.

In 2000, he was the passing game coordinator and quarterbacks coach at TCU in 2000.

He returned to Alabama from 2001 to 2002, this time as offensive coordinator and quarterbacks coach. He performed the same job at Texas A&M from 2003 to 2007, South Alabama from 2008 to 2009 and at Mississippi State from 2009 to 2013.

At Texas A&M, Koenning had called plays from the press box, with head coach Dennis Franchione. In November 2007, the Aggies upset 13th-ranked Texas 38–30. Koenning, known for his recruiting skills recruited top players such as Ryan Tannehill and Martellus Bennett.

After leaving A&M, Koenning was hired by Joey Jones at the University of South Alabama, which was getting ready to play its debut season in 2009.

In December 2008, Dan Mullen, the new head coach at Mississippi State, hired Koenning to coach the offense, though his specific role had not yet been revealed at the time. Mullen announced that Koenning would serve as offensive coordinator in February 2009.

Koenning previously coached receivers at Mississippi State under then-head coach Rockey Felker, during the late 1980s. Though he was replaced after the 1990 season at MSU by Jackie Sherrill, Felker continued to server for years as MSU's director/coordinator of recruiting. Koenning recruited and coached MSU star Quarterback Dak Prescott and during his time at Mississippi State, Koenning orchestrated what were then the top four seasons in school history in total offensive yards, the top two in passing yards and scoring, the top four in passing TDs, and two of the top four in rushing TDs.

In 2014 he left Mississippi State to return to his alma mater, Texas, as wide receivers coach.

== Personal life ==
Koenning is married to Lisa Koenning, and has two children Lana Koenning and Les Koenning. His father, Les Koenning Sr., was a successful Texas high school football Head coach bringing teams to state championships at Hamshire-Fannett, Memorial and Cypress Creek. His cousin, Vic Koenning, has served as a defensive coordinator for several teams, among them Illinois, where he also served as interim head coach.
