= Chris Harrington (American football) =

American football player (born 1985)

No. 55, 96
- Position: Defensive end

Personal information
- Born: January 19, 1985 (age 41); Houston, Texas, U.S.
- Listed height: 6 ft 5 in (1.96 m)
- Listed weight: 264 lb (120 kg)

Career information
- High school: St. Pius X (Houston)
- College: Texas A&M
- NFL draft: 2008: 6th round, 185th overall pick

Career history
- Arizona Cardinals (2008)*; Cincinnati Bengals (2008); Arizona Cardinals (2009)*; Jacksonville Jaguars (2009); Tennessee Titans (2010)*; Florida Tuskers (2010)
- * Offseason or practice squad member only

Awards and highlights
- 2× Second-team All-Big 12 (2006, 2007)

Career NFL statistics
- Total tackles: 3
- Stats at Pro Football Reference

Christopher Edward Harrington (born January 19, 1985) is an American former professional football player who was a defensive end in the National Football League (NFL). He was selected by the Arizona Cardinals in the sixth round of the 2008 NFL draft. He played college football for the Texas A&M Aggies.

Harrington was also a member of the Cincinnati Bengals, Jacksonville Jaguars, Tennessee Titans, and Florida Tuskers.

== Early life ==
He attended St. Pius X High School, in Houston, Texas, graduating in 2003. He was a member of their 1999 State Championship team. He was a two-time All-State selection and also earned All-district and First-team All-State honors as a senior when he recorded 50 tackles and seven sacks and was nominated for ESPN's Army All-American Game. He earned first-team All-State honors as a junior when he totaled 76 tackles and 13 sacks. He was honorable mention All-State honorable mention honors as a sophomore. He was a member of the high school honor roll all four years.

== College career ==
Harrington played college football for the Texas A&M Aggies and started 36 of the 49 games he played in and recorded 156 tackles, 15 sacks and 25 stops behind the line of scrimmage. A two-time All-Big 12 selection, including First-team honors as a junior in 2006 when he played through a right shoulder rotator cuff tear and led the team in solo tackles (30), sacks (7) and tackles for loss (10) as a defensive end. In 2007, he played in 13 games while starting the last 12, totaling 58 tackles, two sacks, caused and recovered two fumbles and blocked a kick on his way to a Second-team All-Big 12 selection. In 2006, he played led the Aggies in solo tackles (30), sacks (7), and tackles behind the line of scrimmage (10) while earning First-team All-Big 12 Conference. He also forced two fumbles and recovered one. In 2005 in his first year as a starter, he began the year by starting the first four games at left defensive end before switching to right defensive end for the remainder of the season. He totaled 25 tackles, four sacks and seven tackles behind the line of scrimmage. In 2004, he was the team's first reserve off the bench at defensive end and appeared in 12 games, posting 14 tackles, two sacks and five tackles for a loss. In 2003, he redshirted.

== Professional career ==
=== Pre-draft ===
Harrington weighed and measured at 6 ft 4 3/8 in (1.940 m), 264 lb (120 kg) at the 2008 NFL Scouting Combine. He did 21 reps of 225 lb (102 kg) and ran a 4.84-second 40-yard dash. He broad jumped 9 ft 9 in (2.97 m) and had a vertical leap of 37 1/2 in (950 mm).

=== Arizona Cardinals (first stint) ===
Harrington was selected by the Arizona Cardinals in the sixth round (185th overall) of the 2008 NFL draft. He signed a three-year contract with the team shortly afterwards. Harrington played in all four of the Cardinals preseason games, producing 10 tackles and a sack, though was released during final cuts on August 30, 2008. The team re-signed him to the practice squad on September 24 after they released wide receiver Onrea Jones.

=== Cincinnati Bengals ===
Harrington was signed off the Cardinals' practice squad by the Cincinnati Bengals on December 10, 2008. The Bengals signed Harrington after losing Eric Henderson to Injured Reserve.

He was waived as a final cut on September 5, 2009.

=== Arizona Cardinals (second stint) ===
Harrington re-signed with the Cardinals on September 8 and joined their practice squad.

=== Jacksonville Jaguars ===
Harrington was signed off the Cardinals' practice squad on December 11 by the Jacksonville Jaguars.

He was waived on August 3, 2010.

=== Tennessee Titans ===
Harrington signed with the Tennessee Titans on August 12, 2010. He was waived on September 4.

== Personal life ==
Harrington is the nephew of former Los Angeles Rams safety Dave Elmendorf.
