= Henry Smith (American football) =

American football player (born 1983)

Profile
- Position: Defensive tackle

Personal information
- Born: July 19, 1983 (age 43); Aliceville, Alabama, U.S.
- Listed height: 6 ft 2 in (1.88 m)
- Listed weight: 310 lb (141 kg)

Career information
- College: Texas A&M
- NFL draft: 2008: undrafted

Career history
- New England Patriots (2008)*; St. Louis Rams (2008)*; Jacksonville Jaguars (2008)*
- * Offseason or practice squad member only

Henry Smith (born July 19, 1983) is an American former football defensive tackle. He was signed by the New England Patriots as an undrafted free agent in 2008. He played college football at Texas A&M.

Smith was also a member of the St. Louis Rams and Jacksonville Jaguars.

== Professional career ==
=== New England Patriots ===
After going undrafted in the 2008 NFL draft, Smith was signed by the New England Patriots. He was waived on June 12.

=== St. Louis Rams ===
Smith was signed by the St. Louis Rams on July 30, 2008, but was waived during final cuts on August 29.

=== Jacksonville Jaguars ===
Smith was signed to the practice squad of the Jacksonville Jaguars on December 23, 2008.
