= Mark Dodge =

U.S. Army soldier and American college football player

Mark Dodge (born December 31, 1980) is a former member of the United States Army and a former college football player for Texas A&M University. Dodge was present during the September 11th Attacks on the Pentagon building, and participated in the rescue efforts and search for victims in the aftermath. After his army service ended, Dodge pursued a college football career, and was repeatedly featured by American national and regional media as a successful student-athlete of a non-traditional age and background.

== Early life ==
Mark Dodge was born on December 31, 1980, in Yerington, Nevada. At the age of two, Dodge's parents Howard and Toni divorced and Dodge began living with his mother at an early age, Dodge's life became centered around working on the family ranch in Yerington. While attending Yerington High School, Dodge became an all-state receiver for the Yerington Lions high school football team, but ultimately made the decision to join the United States Army when he wasn't offered a single athletic scholarship to play college football.

== Military career ==
While serving in the U.S. Army from April 2000 to January 2004, Dodge was assigned to the 3rd U.S. Infantry Regiment, also known as "The Old Guard," the U.S. Army's honor guard that serves at both military funerals at Arlington National Cemetery and for various national ceremonies.

On the morning of September 11th, 2001, Dodge was at the Pentagon filing his application for a White House security clearance. As he watched news coverage of the unfolding attacks on the World Trade Center, American Airlines Flight 77 crashed into the west wall of the Pentagon building. Following the crash, Dodge and his fellow Old Guard members, stationed at the nearby Fort Myer, were mobilized and sent to the crash site. Initially, Dodge was instructed to set up tents for survivors. Once the fires were extinguished, Dodge and his fellow soldiers were then sent into the wreckage to search for the bodies and remains of victims, which were then accounted for and collected by the Federal Bureau of Investigation. In the following weeks, the Old Guard continued searching for victims during the day, and patrolled the capital at night.

== College football career ==
Following the September 11th attacks, as well as his own experiences at the Pentagon, Dodge suffered from post-traumatic stress. "I broke down . . . and cried for the families and cried for my family," Dodge said in a 2006 interview. Consequently, Dodge made the decision to put an end to his military career. Instead, Dodge planned to attend college with the intention of playing football at the collegiate level. He also planned to reconcile with his estranged father. "We both kind of realized we have one life together," Dodge said in 2006.

In the fall of 2004, at the age of 23, after achieving the U.S. Army rank of sergeant and reconciling with his father, Dodge enrolled at Feather River College, a two-year community college in Quincy, California. Quickly, Dodge's performance at inside linebacker gained him national attention from Division I college football programs offering him athletic scholarships. After two seasons at Feather River, Dodge chose Texas A&M University, citing its Reserve Officers' Training Corps (ROTC) military tradition as the deciding factor in his decision. Dodge enrolled at Texas A&M in January 2006.

Over the course of the Texas A&M Aggies football team's spring practices in 2006, Dodge achieved the starting role at inside linebacker and retained it throughout the following summer. Although he did not start the season opener (the result of an ankle injury), on September 2, 2006, at the age of 25 – three to six years older than all of his teammates – Dodge played in his first Division I football game at Texas A&M's Kyle Field against The Citadel. On his first play, Dodge recorded a tackle for a loss. He finished the game with seven tackles and was credited with an assist on a forced fumble in the Aggies' 35–3 victory.

Dodge's story gained national attention when in September 2006, ESPN's "College Game Day" featured a segment in which Dodge was interviewed about his experiences during the September 11th Attacks, as well his experience with college football. "You see stuff like that and it gives you a whole new thought on life; you never know when it can end, you got to take every day as it is. Enjoy every day. I mean, I go out to practice now and love it at practice for every practice because I know I could be doing something a whole lot worse," Dodge said.

Having won the starting position, Dodge played linebacker for two seasons at Texas A&M in 2006 and 2007. As a junior in 2006, Dodge tied for the leading number of interceptions for the team with two. As a senior in 2007, he led the team with 117 total tackles. He ended his two-year college career in 2007, finishing with 168 total tackles, two forced fumbles and two interceptions. Following his senior season, he received honorable mention All-Big 12 honors.

== Life after football ==
On May 2, 2011, following the killing of Osama Bin Ladin, Dodge was asked in an interview how, following the announcement of Bin Ladin's killing, his experiences at the Pentagon had resurfaced in his thoughts:

"[Sunday] night, after they announced that he had been killed, I thought back to burying all of the people that he actually killed. Younger people and families . . . it wasn't just military. It's a big difference from when you're at War and it's a soldier that gets killed. With all of these families and civilians that got killed and with planes flying into the World Trade Center… you look at that stuff and it blows your mind that someone would feel that way against another human being, no matter the circumstances. I looked back at that stuff and I laid there for hours thinking about where I was [on September 11, 2001] and how it's changed. It was really cool. I think that the most emotional part of it was that for a little bit, you saw all of the people of United States – Democrat, Republican and no matter the race or the status – everybody came together and it was all for the one cause. That happened after [September 11] . . . the nation came together for months. It’s unfortunate that things can't remain like that and that people aren't able to work with each other."
