= 2013 Big 12 Conference football season =

American college football season

- League: NCAA Division I FBS (Football Bowl Subdivision)
- Sport: Football
- Duration: August 2013 through January 2014
- Teams: 10

2014 NFL Draft
- Top draft pick: Justin Gilbert (Oklahoma State)
- Picked by: Cleveland Browns, 8th overall

Regular season
- Champion: Baylor

Football seasons
- 2012 2014

2013 Big 12 Conference football standings
	Conf.			Overall
Team	W		L	W		L
No. 13 Baylor $	8	–	1	11	–	2
No. 6 Oklahoma %	7	–	2	11	–	2
No. 17 Oklahoma State	7	–	2	10	–	3
Texas	7	–	2	8	–	5
Kansas State	5	–	4	8	–	5
Texas Tech	4	–	5	8	–	5
TCU	2	–	7	4	–	8
West Virginia	2	–	7	4	–	8
Iowa State	2	–	7	3	–	9
Kansas	1	–	8	3	–	9
$ – BCS representative as conference champion; % – BCS at-large representative; Rankings from AP Poll

The 2013 Big 12 Conference football season was the 18th season for the Big 12, as part of the 2013 NCAA Division I FBS football season.

== Preseason ==
=== Big 12 Media Preseason Poll ===
	Big 12 Media
1.	Oklahoma State (15)
1.	Oklahoma (8)
3.	TCU (9)
4.	Texas (8)
5.	Baylor (2)
6.	Kansas State (1)
7.	Texas Tech
8.	West Virginia
9.	Iowa State
10.	Kansas

() first place votes

=== Preseason All-Big 12 ===
2012 Pre-season Coaches All-Big 12

First Team Offense
Position	Player	Class	Team
QB	Casey Pachall	Sr.	TCU
RB	Lache Seastrunk	Jr.	Baylor
RB	John Hubert	Sr.	Kansas State
WR	Josh Stewart	Jr.	Oklahoma State
WR	Eric Ward	Sr.	Texas Tech
TE	Jace Amaro	Jr.	Texas Tech
OL	Cyril Richardson	Sr.	Baylor
OL	Cornelius Lucas	Sr.	Kansas State
OL	Trey Hopkins	Sr.	Texas
OL	Le'Raven Clark	So.	Texas Tech
C	Gabe Ikard	Sr.	Oklahoma

First Team Defense
Position	Player	Class	Team
DL	Devonte Fields	So.	TCU
DL	Calvin Barnett	Sr.	Oklahoma State
DL	Jackson Jeffcoat	Sr.	Texas
DL	Kerry Hyder	Sr.	Texas Tech
LB	Bryce Hager	Jr.	Baylor
LB	Jordan Hicks	Jr.	Texas
LB	Shaun Lewis	Sr.	Oklahoma State
DB	Ty Zimmerman	Sr.	Kansas State
DB	Jason Verrett	Sr.	TCU
DB	Aaron Colvin	Sr.	Oklahoma
DB	Quandre Diggs	Jr.	Texas

First Team Special Teams
Position	Player	Class	Team
K	Jaden Oberkrom	So.	TCU
P	Kirby Van Der Kamp	Sr.	Iowa State
KR	Tyler Lockett	Jr.	Kansas State
PR	Tramaine Thompson	Sr.	Kansas State

== Rankings ==
Legend
	Increase in ranking
	Decrease in ranking
	Not ranked previous week
RV	Received votes but were not ranked in Top 25 of poll

		Pre	Wk 1	Wk 2	Wk 3	Wk 4	Wk 5	Wk 6	Wk 7	Wk 8	Wk 9	Wk 10	Wk 11	Wk 12	Wk 13	Wk 14	Wk 15	Final
Baylor	AP	RV	23	22	20	19	17	15	12	6	5	5	4	3	9	9	6	13
Baylor	C	RV	RV	22	19	18	16	15	12	5	5	5	4	4	8	7	5	13
Baylor	HAR	Not released							13	5	5	5	4	4	9	9	6	
Baylor	BCS	Not released								8	6	6	5	4	9	9	6	
Iowa State	AP																	
Iowa State	C																	
Iowa State	HAR	Not released																
Iowa State	BCS	Not released																
Kansas	AP																	
Kansas	C																	
Kansas	HAR	Not released																
Kansas	BCS	Not released																
Kansas State	AP	RV																RV
Kansas State	C	RV	RV	RV	RV													RV
Kansas State	HAR	Not released							RV				RV					
Kansas State	BCS	Not released																
Oklahoma	AP	16	16	14	14	14	11	12	18	17	13	12	22	22	20	18	11	6
Oklahoma	C	16	15	13	12	12	10	10	18	12	9	8	17	18	17	15	10	6
Oklahoma	HAR	Not released							17	14	10	10	20	21	19	16	10	
Oklahoma	BCS	Not released								15	10	9	18	20	18	17	11	
Oklahoma State	AP	13	13	12	11	11	21	22	21	19	18	15	12	11	7	6	13	17
Oklahoma State	C	14	14	11	11	11	20	20	17	13	12	11	10	9	7	6	13	17
Oklahoma State	HAR	Not released							19	17	15	14	11	9	7	6	13	
Oklahoma State	BCS	Not released								19	18	14	12	10	7	6	13	
TCU	AP	20	24	24	RV													
TCU	C	20	24	24														
TCU	HAR	Not released																
TCU	BCS	Not released																
Texas	AP	15	15	RV					RV	RV	RV	RV	23	RV	RV	23	RV	
Texas	C	15	16	RV		RV			RV	RV	RV	RV	24	RV	RV	24	RV	
Texas	HAR	Not released							RV	RV	RV	RV	24	RV	RV	24	RV	
Texas	BCS	Not released											24			25		
Texas Tech	AP				25	24	20	20	16	10	15	25						RV
Texas Tech	C		RV	RV	RV	25	22	21	15	9	15	23						RV
Texas Tech	HAR	Not released							15	9	14	25						
Texas Tech	BCS	Not released								10	15	25						
West Virginia	AP																	
West Virginia	C																	
West Virginia	HAR	Not released																
West Virginia	BCS	Not released																

== Head coaches ==
- Art Briles, Baylor
- Paul Rhoads, Iowa State
- Charlie Weis, Kansas
- Bill Snyder, Kansas State
- Bob Stoops, Oklahoma
- Mike Gundy, Oklahoma State
- Gary Patterson, TCU
- Mack Brown, Texas
- Kliff Kingsbury, Texas Tech
- Dana Holgorsen, West Virginia

== Schedule ==
Index to colors and formatting
Big 12 member won
Big 12 member lost
Big 12 teams in **bold**

=== Week one ===
Date	Time	Visiting team	Home team	Site	TV	Result	Attendance	Ref.
August 30	7:00 p.m.	**Texas Tech**	SMU	Gerald J. Ford Stadium • University Park, TX	ESPN	**W** 41–23	34,790	
August 30	7:30 p.m.	North Dakota State	**Kansas State**	Bill Snyder Family Stadium • Manhattan, KS	FS1	**L** 21–24	53,351	
August 31	11:00 a.m.	William & Mary	**West Virginia**	Mountaineer Field • Morgantown, WV	FS1	**W** 24–17	56,350	
August 31	2:30 p.m.	Mississippi State	No. 13 **Oklahoma State**	Reliant Stadium • Houston, TX	ABC / ESPN2	**W** 21–3	35,874	
August 31	6:00 p.m.	Louisiana-Monroe	No. 16 **Oklahoma**	Oklahoma Memorial Stadium • Norman, OK	FSO (PPV)	**W** 34–0	84,911	
August 31	6:30 p.m.	Wofford	**Baylor**	Floyd Casey Stadium • Waco, TX	FSN	**W** 69–3	44,989	
August 31	7:00 p.m.	New Mexico State	No. 15 **Texas**	Darrell K Royal–Texas Memorial Stadium • Austin, TX	LHN	**W** 56–7	99,623	
August 31	7:00 p.m.	Northern Iowa	**Iowa State**	Jack Trice Stadium • Ames, IA		**L** 20–28	56,800	
August 31	8:00 p.m.	No. 12 LSU	No. 20 **TCU**	AT&T Stadium • Arlington, TX	ESPN	**L** 27-37	80,230	
^{#}Rankings from AP Poll released prior to game. All times are in Central Time.

=== Week two ===
Date	Time	Visiting team	Home team	Site	TV	Result	Attendance	Ref.
September 7	11:00 a.m.	No. 13 **Oklahoma State**	UTSA	Alamodome • San Antonio, TX	FS1	**W** 56–35	40,977	
September 7	11:00 a.m.	Southeastern Louisiana	No. 24 **TCU**	Amon G. Carter Stadium • Fort Worth, TX	FSN	**W** 38–17	41,170	
September 7	2:30 p.m.	Buffalo	No. 23 **Baylor**	Floyd Casey Stadium • Waco, TX	FSN	**W** 13–70	39,126	
September 7	5:30 p.m.	Louisiana-Lafayette	**Kansas State**	Bill Snyder Family Stadium • Manhattan, KS	FS1	**W** 27–48	52,073	
September 7	6:00 p.m.	No. 15 **Texas**	BYU	LaVell Edwards Stadium • Provo, UT	ESPN2	**L** 21–40	63,197	
September 7	6:00 p.m.	**West Virginia**	No. 16 **Oklahoma**	Oklahoma Memorial Stadium • Norman, OK	FOX	**OU** 7–16	84,692	
September 7	6:00 p.m.	South Dakota	**Kansas**	Memorial Stadium • Lawrence, KS	ESPN3	**W** 14–31	41,920	
September 7	6:00 p.m.	Stephen F. Austin	**Texas Tech**	Jones AT&T Stadium • Lubbock, TX	FSN	**W** 23–61	54,086	
^{#}Rankings from AP Poll released prior to game. All times are in Central Time.

=== Week three ===
Date	Time	Visiting team	Home team	Site	TV	Result	Attendance	Ref.
September 12	6:30 p.m.	No. 24 **TCU**	**Texas Tech**	Jones AT&T Stadium • Lubbock, TX	ESPN	**TTU** 10–20	58,701	
September 14	11:00 a.m.	Tulsa	No. 14 **Oklahoma**	Oklahoma Memorial Stadium • Norman, OK	ESPN2	**W** 20–51	84,229	
September 14	11:00 a.m.	Georgia State	**West Virginia**	Mountaineer Field • Morgantown, WV		**W** 7–41	57,440	
September 14	5:00 p.m.	Iowa	**Iowa State**	Jack Trice Stadium • Ames, IA	FS1	**L** 27–21	56,800	
September 14	6:00 p.m.	UMass	**Kansas State**	Bill Snyder Family Stadium • Manhattan, KS		**W** 7–37	52,958	
September 14	6:30 p.m.	Lamar	No. 12 **Oklahoma State**	Boone Pickens Stadium • Stillwater, OK	FSN	**W** 3–59	59,061	
September 14	6:30 p.m.	**Kansas**	Rice	Rice Stadium • Houston, TX	CBSS	**L** 14–23	22,974	
September 14	7:00 p.m.	No. 25 Ole Miss	**Texas**	Darrell K Royal–Texas Memorial Stadium • Austin, TX	LHN	**L** 44–23	101,474	
^{#}Rankings from AP Poll released prior to game. All times are in Central Time.

=== Week four ===
Date	Time	Visiting team	Home team	Site	TV	Result	Attendance	Ref.
September 21	11:00 a.m.	Louisiana Tech	**Kansas**	Memorial Stadium • Lawrence, KS	FS1	**W** 10–13	39,823	
September 21	2:30 p.m.	**West Virginia**	Maryland	M&T Bank Stadium • Baltimore, MD	ESPNU	**L** 0–37	55,677	
September 21	3:00 p.m.	Louisiana–Monroe	No. 20 **Baylor**	Floyd Casey Stadium • Waco, TX	FS1	**W** 7–70	42,967	
September 21	6:00 p.m.	Texas State	No. 25 **Texas Tech**	Jones AT&T Stadium • Lubbock, TX	FSN	**W** 7–33	60,997	
September 21	7:00 p.m.	**Kansas State**	**Texas**	Darrell K Royal–Texas Memorial Stadium • Austin, TX	ABC	UT 21–31	95,248	
^{#}Rankings from AP Poll released prior to game. All times are in Central Time.

=== Week five ===
Date	Time	Visiting team	Home team	Site	TV	Result	Attendance	Ref.
September 26	6:30 p.m.	**Iowa State**	Tulsa	H. A. Chapman Stadium • Tulsa, OK	FS1	**W** 38–21	20,137	
September 28	11:00 a.m.	No. 11 **Oklahoma State**	**West Virginia**	Mountaineer Field • Morgantown, WV	ABC	**WVU** 21–30	57,280	
September 28	11:00 a.m.	SMU	**TCU**	Amon G. Carter Stadium • Fort Worth, TX	FS1	**W** 17–48	45,111	
September 28	2:30 p.m.	No. 14 **Oklahoma**	No. 22 Notre Dame	Notre Dame Stadium • Notre Dame, IN	NBC	**W** 35–21	80,795	
^{#}Rankings from AP Poll released prior to game. All times are in Central Time.

=== Week six ===
Date	Time	Visiting team	Home team	Site	TV	Result	Attendance	Ref.
October 3	6:30 p.m.	**Texas**	**Iowa State**	Jack Trice Stadium • Ames, IA	ESPN	**UT** 31–30	52,762	
October 5	11:00 a.m.	No. 20 **Texas Tech**	**Kansas**	Bill Snyder Family Stadium • Manhattan, KS	FS1	**TTU** 54–16	25,648	
October 5	2:30 p.m.	**Kansas State**	No. 21 **Oklahoma State**	Boone Pickens Stadium • Stillwater, OK	ABC	**OSU** 29–33	58,841	
October 5	6:00 p.m.	**TCU**	No. 11 **Oklahoma**	Oklahoma Memorial Stadium • Norman, OK	FOX	**OU** 17–20	84,992	
October 5	7:00 p.m.	**West Virginia**	No. 17 **Baylor**	Floyd Casey Stadium • Waco, TX	FS1	**BU** 42–73	45,467	
^{#}Rankings from AP Poll released prior to game. All times are in Central Time.

=== Week seven ===
Date	Time	Visiting team	Home team	Site	TV	Result	Attendance	Ref.
October 12	11:00 a.m.	No. 12 **Oklahoma**	**Texas**	Cotton Bowl • Dallas, TX	ABC	**UT** 20–36	92,500	
October 12	11:00 a.m.	**Iowa State**	No. 20 **Texas Tech**	Jones AT&T Stadium • Lubbock, TX	FS1	**TTU** 35–42	57,367	
October 12	11:00 a.m.	**Kansas**	**TCU**	Amon G. Carter Stadium • Fort Worth, TX	FSN	**TCU** 17–27	41,894	
October 12	2:30 p.m.	No. 15 **Baylor**	**Kansas State**	Bill Snyder Family Stadium • Manhattan, KS	FOX	**BU** 35–25	52,803	
^{#}Rankings from AP Poll released prior to game. All times are in Central Time.

=== Week eight ===
Date	Time	Visiting team	Home team	Site	TV	Result	Attendance	Ref.
October 19	11:00 a.m.	No. 16 **Texas Tech**	**West Virginia**	Mountaineer Field • Morgantown, WV	FS1	**TTU** 37–27	54,084	
October 19	11:00 a.m.	**TCU**	No. 21 **Oklahoma State**	Boone Pickens Stadium • Stillwater, OK	FOX	**OSU** 10–24	59,638	
October 19	2:30 p.m.	No. 18 **Oklahoma**	**Kansas**	Memorial Stadium • Lawrence, KS	ESPN	**OU** 34–19	41,113	
October 19	6:00 p.m.	**Iowa State**	No. 12 **Baylor**	Floyd Casey Stadium • Waco, TX	ESPNU	**BU** 7–71	46,825	
^{#}Rankings from AP Poll released prior to game. All times are in Central Time.

=== Week nine ===
Date	Time	Visiting team	Home team	Site	TV	Result	Attendance	Ref.
October 26	11:00 a.m.	No. 19 **Oklahoma State**	**Iowa State**	Jack Trice Stadium • Ames, IA	FSN	**OSU** 58–27	56,800	
October 26	2:45 p.m.	**West Virginia**	**Kansas State**	Bill Snyder Family Stadium • Manhattan, KS	FS1	**KSU** 12–35	52,898	
October 26	3:45 p.m.	No. 10 **Texas Tech**	No. 17 **Oklahoma**	Oklahoma Memorial Stadium • Norman, OK	FOX	**OU** 30–38	84,734	
October 26	6:00 p.m.	No. 6 **Baylor**	**Kansas**	Memorial Stadium • Lawrence, KS	ESPNU	**BU** 59–14	32,264	
October 26	6:30 p.m.	**Texas**	**TCU**	Amon G. Carter Stadium • Fort Worth, TX	FS1	**UT** 30–7	48,212	
^{#}Rankings from AP Poll released prior to game. All times are in Central Time.

=== Week ten ===
Date	Time	Visiting team	Home team	Site	TV	Result	Attendance	Ref.
November 2	2:30 p.m.	**Kansas**	**Texas**	Darrell K Royal–Texas Memorial Stadium • Austin, TX	LHN	**UT** 13–35	97,105	
November 2	2:30 p.m.	**Iowa State**	**Kansas State**	Bill Snyder Family Stadium • Manhattan, KS	FS1	**KSU** 7–41	52,542	
November 2	2:30 p.m.	**West Virginia**	**TCU**	Amon G. Carter Stadium • Fort Worth, TX	ESPNU	**WVU** 30–27 ^{OT}	41,632	
November 2	6:00 p.m.	No. 18 **Oklahoma State**	No. 15 **Texas Tech**	Jones AT&T Stadium • Lubbock, TX	FOX	**OSU** 52–34	61,836	
^{#}Rankings from AP Poll released prior to game. All times are in Central Time.

=== Week eleven ===
Date	Time	Visiting team	Home team	Site	TV	Result	Attendance	Ref.
November 7	6:30 p.m.	No. 12 **Oklahoma**	No. 5 **Baylor**	Floyd Casey Stadium • Waco, TX	FS1	**BU** 12–41	50,537	
November 9	11:00 a.m.	**Kansas State**	No. 25 **Texas Tech**	Jones AT&T Stadium • Lubbock, TX	ABC	**KSU** 49–26	54,609	
November 9	11:00 a.m.	**TCU**	**Iowa State**	Jack Trice Stadium • Ames, IA	FSN	**TCU** 21–17	54,922	
November 9	3:00 p.m.	**Kansas**	No. 15 **Oklahoma State**	Boone Pickens Stadium • Stillwater, OK	FS1	**OSU** 6–42	58,476	
November 9	6:00 p.m.	**Texas**	**West Virginia**	Mountaineer Field • Morgantown, WV	FOX	**UT** 47–40 ^{OT}	58,570	
^{#}Rankings from AP Poll released prior to game. All times are in Central Time.

=== Week twelve ===
Date	Time	Visiting team	Home team	Site	TV	Result	Attendance	Ref.
November 16	11:00 a.m.	**West Virginia**	**Kansas**	Memorial Stadium • Lawrence, KS	FSN	**KU** 19–31	30,809	
November 16	11:00 a.m.	**Iowa State**	No. 22 **Oklahoma**	Oklahoma Memorial Stadium • Norman, OK	FS1	**OU** 10–48	84,776	
November 16	2:30 p.m.	**TCU**	**Kansas State**	Bill Snyder Family Stadium • Manhattan, KS	FSN	**KSU** 31–33	52,697	
November 16	2:30 p.m.	No. 12 **Oklahoma State**	No. 23 **Texas**	Darrell K Royal–Texas Memorial Stadium • Austin, TX	FOX	**OSU** 38–13	99,739	
November 16	6:00 p.m.	**Texas Tech**	No. 4 **Baylor**	AT&T Stadium • Arlington, TX	FOX	**BU** 34–63	69,188	
^{#}Rankings from AP Poll released prior to game. All times are in Central Time.

=== Week thirteen ===
Date	Time	Visiting team	Home team	Site	TV	Result	Attendance	Ref.
November 23	11:00 a.m.	No. 22 **Oklahoma**	**Kansas State**	Bill Snyder Family Stadium • Manhattan, KS	FS1	**OU** 41–31	52,773	
November 23	7:00 p.m.	**Kansas**	**Iowa State**	Jack Trice Stadium • Ames, IA	FS1	**ISU** 0–34	54,081	
November 23	7:00 p.m.	No. 3 **Baylor**	No. 11 **Oklahoma State**	Boone Pickens Stadium • Stillwater, OK	ABC	**OSU** 17–49	60,218	
^{#}Rankings from AP Poll released prior to game. All times are in Central Time.

=== Week fourteen ===
Date	Time	Visiting team	Home team	Site	TV	Result	Attendance	Ref.
November 28	6:30 p.m.	**Texas Tech**	**Texas**	Darrell K Royal–Texas Memorial Stadium • Austin, TX	FS1	**UT** 16–41	100,668	
November 30	11:00 a.m.	**Kansas State**	**Kansas**	Memorial Stadium • Lawrence, KS	FS1	**KSU** 31–10	43,610	
November 30	2:30 p.m.	No. 9 **Baylor**	**TCU**	Amon G. Carter Stadium • Fort Worth, TX	ESPN2	**BU** 41–38	43,568	
November 30	3:00 p.m.	**Iowa State**	**West Virginia**	Mountaineer Field • Morgantown, WV	FS1	**ISU** 52–44 ^{3OT}	33,735	
^{#}Rankings from AP Poll released prior to game. All times are in Central Time.

=== Week fifteen ===
Date	Time	Visiting team	Home team	Site	TV	Result	Attendance	Ref.
December 7	11:00 a.m.	No. 18 **Oklahoma**	No. 6 **Oklahoma State**	Boone Pickens Stadium • Stillwater, OK	ABC	**OU** 33–24	58,520	
December 7	2:30 p.m.	No. 23 **Texas**	No. 9 **Baylor**	Floyd Casey Stadium • Waco, TX	FOX	**BU** 10–30	51,728	
^{#}Rankings from AP Poll released prior to game. All times are in Central Time.

== Post-Season ==
=== Bowl Games ===
Date	Time	Visiting team	Home team	Site	TV	Result	Attendance	Ref.
December 28	9:15 p.m.	Michigan Wolverines	Kansas State	Sun Devil Stadium • Tempe, AZ (Buffalo Wild Wings Bowl)	ESPN	W 14–31	53,284	
December 30	5:45 p.m.	No. 10 Oregon Ducks	Texas	Alamodome • San Antonio, TX (Alamo Bowl)	ESPN	L 30–7	65,918	
December 30	9:15 p.m.	Texas Tech	No. 14 Arizona State Sun Devils	Qualcomm Stadium • San Diego, CA (Holiday Bowl)	ESPN	W 23–37	52,930	
January 3	6:30 p.m.	No. 8 Missouri Tigers	No. 13 Oklahoma State	AT&T Stadium • Arlington, TX (Cotton Bowl)	FOX	L 31–41	72,690	
^{#}Rankings from AP Poll released prior to game. All times are in Central Time.

=== BCS Bowl Games ===
Date	Time	Visiting team	Home team	Site	TV	Result	Attendance	Ref.
January 1	7:30 pm	No. 6 Baylor	No. 15 UCF Knights	University of Phoenix Stadium • Glendale, AZ (Fiesta Bowl)	ESPN	L 52–42	65,172	
January 2	7:30 p.m.	No. 3 Alabama Crimson Tide	No. 11 Oklahoma	Mercedes-Benz Superdome • New Orleans, LA (Sugar Bowl)	ESPN	W 45–31	70,473	
^{#}Rankings from AP Poll released prior to game. All times are in Central Time.

== Awards and honors ==
=== National Awards ===
None

=== Consensus All-Americans ===
Tight end

- Jace Amaro, Texas Tech

Offensive line

- Gabe Ikard, Oklahoma
- Cyril Richardson, Baylor

Defensive line

- Jackson Jeffcoat, Texas

Defensive back

- Ahmad Dixon, Baylor
- Justin Gilbert, Oklahoma State
- Jason Verrett, TCU

Kicker

- Anthony Fera, Texas

=== All-Big 12 Individual Awards ===
- Offensive Player of the Year: Bryce Petty, Baylor
- Co-Defensive Players of the Year: Jackson Jeffcoat, Texas; Jason Verrett, TCU
- Offensive Newcomer of the Year: Charles Sims, West Virginia
- Defensive Newcomer of the Year: Isaiah Johnson, Kansas
- Offensive Freshman of the Year: Baker Mayfield, Texas Tech
- Defensive Freshman of the Year: Dominique Alexander, Oklahoma
- Offensive Lineman of the Year: Cyril Richardson, Baylor
- Defensive Lineman of the Year: Ryan Mueller, Kansas State
- Special Teams Player of the Year: Tyler Lockett, Kansas State
- Chuck Neinas Coach of the Year: Art Briles, Baylor

=== All-Big 12 Teams ===
The Big 12 Conference coaches voted for the All-Big 12 teams after the regular season concluded.

Coaches were not permitted to vote for their own players.

First Team Offense
Position	Player	Class	Team
QB	Bryce Petty	Jr.	Baylor
RB	Lache Seastrunk	Jr.	Baylor
RB	Charles Sims	Sr.	West Virginia
WR	Antwan Goodley	Jr.	Baylor
WR	Tevin Reese	Sr.	Baylor
WR	Tyler Lockett	Jr.	Kansas State
TE	Jace Amaro	Jr.	Texas Tech
OL	Spencer Drango	So.	Baylor
OL	Cyril Richardson	Sr.	Baylor
C	Gabe Ikard	Sr.	Oklahoma
OL	B. J. Finney	Sr.	Kansas State
OL	Parker Graham	Sr.	Oklahoma State

First Team Defense
Position	Player	Class	Team
DL	Chris McAllister	Sr.	Baylor
DL	Ryan Mueller	Jr.	Kansas State
DL	Charles Tapper	So.	Oklahoma
DL	Calvin Barnett	Sr.	Oklahoma State
DL	Jackson Jeffcoat	Sr.	Texas
LB	Bryce Hager	Sr.	Baylor
LB	Jeremiah George	Sr.	Iowa State
LB	Shaun Lewis	Sr.	Oklahoma State
DB	Ahmad Dixon	Sr.	Baylor
DB	Ty Zimmerman	Sr.	Kansas State
DB	Aaron Colvin	Sr.	Oklahoma
DB	Justin Gilbert	Sr.	Oklahoma State
DB	Jason Verrett	Sr.	TCU

First Team Special Teams
Position	Player	Class	Team
K	Anthony Fera	Sr.	Texas
P	Spencer Roth	Jr.	Baylor
KR/PR	Tyler Lockett	Jr.	Kansas State

== 2014 NFL draft ==
Team	Round 1	Round 2	Round 3	Round 4	Round 5	Round 6	Round 7	Total
Baylor	0	0	0	0	1	2	2	5
Iowa State	0	0	0	0	1	0	0	1
Kansas	0	0	0	0	0	0	0	0
Kansas State	0	0	0	0	0	1	0	1
Oklahoma	0	0	0	2	0	0	2	4
Oklahoma State	1	0	0	0	0	0	0	1
TCU	1	0	0	0	0	0	0	1
Texas	0	0	0	0	0	0	0	0
Texas Tech	0	1	0	0	0	0	1	2
West Virginia	0	2	0	0	0	0	0	2

Rnd.	Pick	Team	Player	Pos.	College	Notes
1	8	Cleveland Browns	Justin Gilbert	CB	Oklahoma State	from Minnesota (Note: No. 8: Minnesota → Cleveland (D). Minnesota traded this selection to Cleveland in exchange for Cleveland's first- and fifth-round selections (Nos. 9 and 145 overall, respectively).)
1	25	San Diego Chargers	Jason Verrett	CB	TCU	
2	49	New York Jets	Jace Amaro	TE	Texas Tech	
3	69	Tampa Bay Buccaneers	Charles Sims	RB	West Virginia	
3	88	Cincinnati Bengals	Will Clarke	DE	West Virginia	
4	104	New York Jets	Jalen Saunders	WR	Oklahoma	from Tampa Bay (Note: No. 104: Tampa Bay → New York Jets (PD). Tampa Bay traded this selection and its 2013 first round selection (13th) to the Jets in exchange for cornerback Darrelle Revis. The pick became this fourth rounder, rather than a third round selection, when Tampa released Revis prior to the start of the 2014 league year in March.)
4	114	Jacksonville Jaguars	Aaron Colvin	CB	Oklahoma	from Baltimore (Note: No. 114: Baltimore → Jacksonville (PD). Baltimore traded this selection along with their fifth round selection (159th) to Jacksonville in exchange for offensive tackle Eugene Monroe.)
5	153	Buffalo Bills	Cyril Richardson	G	Baylor	from Buffalo (Note: No. 153: Buffalo → St. Louis (D). Buffalo traded 41st selection to St. Louis in exchange for St. Louis' second and fifth round selections (44th & 153rd).)
5	154	New York Jets	Jeremiah George	LB	Iowa State	
6						
7						

N.B: In the explanations below, (D) denotes trades that took place during the 2014 Draft, while (PD) indicates trades completed pre-draft.
