= 2013 Kansas Jayhawks football team =

American college football season

2013 Kansas Jayhawks football
- Conference: Big 12 Conference
- Record: 3–9 (1–8 Big 12)
- Head coach: Charlie Weis (2nd season)
- Offensive scheme: Multiple
- Defensive coordinator: Dave Campo (2nd season)
- Base defense: Multiple
- Home stadium: Memorial Stadium

2013 Big 12 Conference football standings
	Conf.			Overall
Team	W		L	W		L
No. 13 Baylor $	8	–	1	11	–	2
No. 6 Oklahoma %	7	–	2	11	–	2
No. 17 Oklahoma State	7	–	2	10	–	3
Texas	7	–	2	8	–	5
Kansas State	5	–	4	8	–	5
Texas Tech	4	–	5	8	–	5
TCU	2	–	7	4	–	8
West Virginia	2	–	7	4	–	8
Iowa State	2	–	7	3	–	9
Kansas	1	–	8	3	–	9
$ – BCS representative as conference champion; % – BCS at-large representative; Rankings from AP Poll

The 2013 Kansas Jayhawks football team represented the University of Kansas in the 2013 NCAA Division I FBS football season. The Jayhawks were led by second year head coach Charlie Weis and played their home games at Memorial Stadium. They were a member of the Big 12 Conference.

On September 21, with a 13–10 win over Louisiana Tech, the Jayhawks ended a 22-game losing streak to FBS opponents. On November 16, the Jayhawks ended their 27 conference game losing streak with a 31–19 defeat of visiting West Virginia. The conference win was the Jayhawks first conference win since their 52–45 defeat of Colorado during the 2010 season.

== Coaching staff ==
Name	Position
Charlie Weis	Head coach
Dave Campo	Assistant head coach-Defense/defensive Backs coach
Tim Grunhard	Offensive line coach
Rob Ianello	Wide receivers coach/recruiting coordinator
Reggie Mitchell	Running backs coach
Ron Powlus	Quarterbacks coach
Jeff Blasko	Tight ends coach
Buddy Wyatt	Defensive line coach
Clint Bowen	Linebackers coach
Scott Vestal	Assistant defensive backs coach

== Schedule ==
Date	Time	Opponent	Site	TV	Result	Attendance
September 7	6:00 p.m.	South Dakota*	Memorial Stadium; Lawrence, KS	Jayhawk SN	W 31–14	41,920
September 14	6:30 p.m.	at Rice*	Rice Stadium; Houston, TX	CBSSN	L 14–23	22,974
September 21	11:00 a.m.	Louisiana Tech*	Memorial Stadium; Lawrence, KS	FS1	W 13–10	39,823
October 5	11:00 a.m.	No. 20 Texas Tech^{†}	Memorial Stadium; Lawrence, KS	FS1	L 16–54	35,648
October 12	11:00 a.m.	at TCU	Amon G. Carter Stadium; Fort Worth, TX	FSN	L 17–27	41,894
October 19	2:30 p.m.	No. 18 Oklahoma	Memorial Stadium; Lawrence, KS	ESPN	L 19–34	41,113
October 26	6:00 p.m.	No. 6 Baylor	Memorial Stadium; Lawrence, KS	ESPNU	L 14–59	32,264
November 2	2:30 p.m.	at Texas	Darrell K Royal–Texas Memorial Stadium; Austin, TX	Jayhawk SN/LHN	L 13–35	97,105
November 9	3:00 p.m.	at No. 15 Oklahoma State	Boone Pickens Stadium; Stillwater, OK	FS1	L 6–42	58,476
November 16	11:00 a.m.	West Virginia	Memorial Stadium; Lawrence, KS	FSN	W 31–19	30,809
November 23	7:00 p.m.	at Iowa State	Jack Trice Stadium; Ames, IA	FS1	L 0–34	54,081
November 30	11:00 a.m.	Kansas State	Memorial Stadium; Lawrence, KS (Sunflower Showdown)	FS1	L 10–31	43,610
*Non-conference game; ^{†}Homecoming; Rankings from AP Poll released prior to the game; All times are in Central time

== Roster ==
2013 Kansas Jayhawks football roster
(Starters in bold)
**Quarterbacks**: 2 Montell Cozart – Fr.; 9 **Jake Heaps** – (redshirt) Jr.; 10 T.J. Millweard – (redshirt) (TR); 14 Michael Cummings – (redshirt) So.; 16 Jordan Darling – Fr.; 17 Blake Jablonski – (redshirt) Jr.; **Running backs**: 3 Tony Pierson – Jr.; 6 Darrian Miller – (redshirt) So.; 20 Colin Spencer – Fr.; 25 Brandon Bourbon – (redshirt) Jr.; 29 **James Sims** – Sr.; 34 Connor Embree – (redshirt) Jr.; 36 Taylor Cox – Sr.; 40 Preston Randall – (redshirt) Fr.; **Fullbacks**: 25 Brandon Bourbon – (redshirt) Jr.; 35 T.J. Semke – (redshirt) So.; 43 Ed Fink – (redshirt) Jr.; 85 **Trent Smiley** – (redshirt) Jr.; **Wide receivers**: 1 Rodriguez Coleman – Jr.; 3 **Tony Pierson** – Jr.; 7 Mark Thomas – Jr.; 8 Josh Ford – Sr.; 11 Tre' Parmalee – So.; 12 **Christian Matthews** – (redshirt) Sr.; 13 Ishmael Hyman – Fr.; 15 Matt Hentges – (redshirt) Fr.; 19 **Justin McCay** – (redshirt) Jr.; 80 Ricki Herod – (redshirt) Jr.; 81 Billy Owens – (redshirt) Jr.; 82 Andrew Turzilli – (redshirt) Jr.; 88 Nick Harwell – (redshirt); **Tight ends**: 41 **Jimmay Mundine** – (redshirt) Jr.; 44 Scott Baron – (redshirt) So.; 45 Nick Sizemore – (redshirt) Sr.; 84 Ben Johnson – Fr.; 85 Trent Smiley – (redshirt) Jr.; 86 Charles Brooks – Sr.; 87 Jordan Shelley-Smith – (redshirt) Fr.	**Offensive line**: 50 Jamal Brown – Jr.; 61 **Pat Lewandowski** – (redshirt) Jr.; 63 **Ngalu Fusimalohi** – Jr.; 64 Randall Dent – (redshirt) Sr.; 65 **Mike Smithburg** – Jr.; 66 Dylan Admire – (redshirt) So.; 67 Joey Bloomfield – Fr.; 70 **Gavin Howard** – (redshirt) Sr.; 72 Zach Fondal – Jr.; 73 Damon Martin – (redshirt) So.; 74 Brian Beckmann – (redshirt) Fr.; 75 Sean Connolly – (redshirt) Fr.; 76 Bryan Peters – (redshirt) So.; 77 **Aslam Sterling** – Sr.; 78 Joe Gibson – Fr.; 79 Riley Spencer – (redshirt) Sr.; **Defensive line**: 9 Jordan Tavai – Sr.; 35 T.J. Semke – (redshirt) So.; 54 Neal Page – (redshirt) Fr.; 69 Peter Gallo – (redshirt) Fr.; 90 **Kevin Young** – (redshirt) Sr.; 91 Shane Smith – (redshirt) Sr.; 93 **Ben Goodman** – (redshirt) So.; 94 Tyler Holmes – (redshirt) Fr.; 95 Andrew Bolton – Jr.; 96 **Keba Agostinho** – Sr.; 97 Ty McKinney – Jr.; 98 **Keon Stowers** – Jr.; 99 Tedarian Johnson – Jr.	**Linebackers**: 2 Marcus Jenkins-Moore – (redshirt); 4 Prinz Kande – (redshirt) Sr.; 31 **Ben Heeney** – Jr.; 32 Schyler Miles – So.; 37 Beau Bell – So.; 44 Mike Zunica – So. (TR); 46 Kellen Ash – Fr.; 47 Brian Maura – (redshirt) Jr.; 51 Samson Faifili – Jr.; 52 Darius Willis – (redshirt) Sr.; 53 Colton Goeas – Fr.; 55 Michael Reynolds – Jr.; 57 **Jake Love** – (redshirt) So.; 58 Courtney Arnick – (redshirt) Fr.; 59 Cameron Rosser – Fr.; **Cornerbacks**: 7 Kevin Short – (redshirt); 11 Tyree Williams – So.; 12 **Dexter McDonald** – Jr.; 14 Nasir Moore – (redshirt) Jr.; 22 Greg Allen – (redshirt) Fr.; 24 **JaCorey Shepherd** – Jr.; 26 Brandon Hollomon – So.; 49 Deron Dangerfield – Sr.; **Safeties**: 5 **Isaiah Johnson** – So.; 23 Dexter Linton – (redshirt) Sr.; 27 **Victor Simmons** – Jr.; 30 Tevin Shaw – (redshirt) Fr.; 38 Jaccare Givens – Jr. (TR); 33 **Cassius Sendish** – Jr.; 43 Alex Matlock – (redshirt) So.; **Special teams**: 13 Ron Doherty – Sr. (P/K); 15 Michael Mesh – Jr. (K); 16 **Trevor Pardula** – Jr. (P/K); 18 Eric Kahn – Jr. (K); 28 **Matthew Wyman** – So. (K); 39 Austin Barone – (redshirt) Fr. (K); 60 Reilly Jeffers – So. (LS); 62 Zack Young – Sr. (LS); 68 **John Wirtel** – Fr. (LS)

== Awards ==
Trevor Pardula

- Week 4 Ray Guy Award Player of the Week
- Week 4 Big 12 Special Teams Player of the Week
- Week 4 College Football Performance Awards Punter of the Week

Isiah Johnson

- Big 12 Newcomer of the Year

=== All Conference ===
2nd team

- James sims – RB
- Ben heeny – LB

Honorable Mention

- Ngalu fusimalohi – OL
- Isaiah johnson – DB
- Dexter mcdonald – DB
- Jimmay mundine – TE
- Trevor pardula – P
- JaCorey shepherd – KR/PR/DB
- James sims – RB
