= 2013 All-Big 12 Conference football team =

The 2013 All-Big 12 Conference football team consists of American football players chosen as All-Big 12 Conference players for the 2013 Big 12 Conference football season. The conference recognizes two official All-Big 12 selectors: (1) the Big 12 conference coaches selected separate offensive and defensive units and named first- and second-team players (the "Coaches" team); and (2) a panel of sports writers and broadcasters covering the Big 12 also selected offensive and defensive units and named first- and second-team players (the "Media" team).

== Offensive selections ==
=== Quarterbacks ===
- Bryce Petty, Baylor (Coaches-1; Media-1)
- Clint Chelf, Oklahoma State (Coaches-2; Media-2)

=== Running backs ===
- Lache Seastrunk, Baylor (Coaches-1; Media-1)
- Charles Sims, West Virginia (Coaches-1; Media-2)
- James Sims, Kansas (Coaches-2; Media-1)
- Malcolm Brown, Texas (Coaches-2)

=== Fullbacks ===
- Trey Millard, Oklahoma (Coaches-1)
- Kye Staley, Oklahoma State (Coaches-2)

=== Centers ===
- Gabe Ikard, Oklahoma (Coaches-1; Media-1)
- B. J. Finney, Kansas State (Coaches-1; Media-2)

=== Guards ===
- Cyril Richardson, Baylor (Coaches-1; Media-1)
- Trey Hopkins, Texas (Coaches-2; Media-1)
- Quinton Spain, West Virginia (Media-2)
- Cody Whitehair, Kansas State (Coaches-2)

=== Tackles ===
- Parker Graham, Oklahoma State (Coaches-1; Media-1)
- Le'Raven Clark, Texas Tech (Coaches-2; Media-1)
- Spencer Drango, Baylor (Coaches-1; Media-2)
- Donald Hawkins, Texas (Coaches-2; Media-2)
- Cornelius Lucas, Kansas State (Media-2)
- Daryl Williams, Oklahoma (Coaches-2)

=== Tight ends ===
- Jace Amaro, Texas Tech (Coaches-1; Media-1)
- E. J. Bibbs, Iowa State (Coaches-2; Media-2)

=== Receivers ===
- Antwan Goodley, Baylor (Coaches-1; Media-1)
- Tyler Lockett, Kansas State (Coaches-1; Media-1)
- Tevin Reese, Baylor (Coaches-1; Media-2)
- Mike Davis, Texas (Media-2)
- Jalen Saunders, Oklahoma (Coaches-2)
- Jaxon Shipley, Texas (Coaches-2)
- Josh Stewart, Oklahoma State (Coaches-2)
- Eric Ward, Texas Tech (Media-2)

== Defensive selections ==
=== Defensive linemen ===
- Calvin Barnett, Oklahoma State (Coaches-1; Media-1)
- Jackson Jeffcoat, Texas (Coaches-1; Media-1)
- Ryan Mueller, Kansas State (Coaches-1; Media-1)
- Cedric Reed, Texas (Coaches-2; Media-1)
- Chris McAllister, Baylor (Coaches-1; Media-2)
- Charles Tapper, Oklahoma (Coaches-1; Media-2)
- Will Clarke, West Virginia (Coaches-2; Media-2)
- Kerry Hyder, Texas Tech (Coaches-2; Media-2)
- Tyler Johnson, Oklahoma State (Coaches-2)
- Chucky Hunter, TCU (Coaches-2)

=== Linebackers ===
- Jeremiah George, Iowa State (Coaches-1; Media-1)
- Eddie Lackey, Baylor (Coaches-1; Media-1)
- Caleb Lavey, Oklahoma St (Coaches-2; Media-1)
- Shaun Lewis, Oklahoma State (Coaches-1; Media-2)
- Will Smith, Texas Tech (Media-1)
- Ben Heeney, Kansas (Coaches-2; Media-2)
- Bryce Hager, Baylor (Media-2)
- Blake Slaughter, Kansas State (Media-2)
- Eric Striker, Oklahoma (Coaches-2)

=== Defensive backs ===
- Aaron Colvin, Oklahoma (Coaches-1; Media-1)
- Justin Gilbert, Oklahoma State (Coaches-1; Media-1)
- Jason Verrett, TCU (Coaches-1; Media-1)
- Ty Zimmerman, Kansas State (Coaches-1; Media-1)
- Ahmad Dixon, Baylor (Coaches-1; Media-2)
- Sam Carter, TCU (Coaches-2; Media-2)
- Daytawion Lowe, Oklahoma State (Coaches-2; Media-2)
- Carrington Byndom, Texas (Coaches-2)
- Darwin Cook, West Virginia (Coaches-2)
- Chris Hackett, TCU (Media-2)
- Jacques Washington, Iowa State (Coaches-2)

== Special teams ==
=== Kickers ===
- Anthony Fera, Texas (Coaches-1; Media-1)
- Mike Hunnicutt, Oklahoma (Coaches-2; Media-2)

=== Punters ===
- Spencer Roth, Baylor (Coaches-1; Media-1)
- Nick O'Toole, West Virginia (Coaches-2; Media-2)
- Kirby Van Der Kamp, Iowa State (Coaches-2)

=== All-purpose / Return specialists ===
- Tyler Lockett, Kansas State (Coaches-1; Media-1)
- Charles Sims, West Virginia (Media-2)
- Josh Stewart, Oklahoma State (Coaches-2)

== Key ==
Bold = selected as a first-team player by both the coaches and media panel

Coaches = selected by Big 12 Conference coaches

Media = selected by a media panel

== See also ==
- 2013 College Football All-America Team
