= 2013 Iowa State Cyclones football team =

American college football season

2013 Iowa State Cyclones football
- Conference: Big 12 Conference
- Record: 3–9 (2–7 Big 12)
- Head coach: Paul Rhoads (5th season)
- Offensive coordinator: Courtney Messingham (2nd season)
- Offensive scheme: Pistol
- Defensive coordinator: Wally Burnham (5th season)
- Base defense: 4–3
- Home stadium: Jack Trice Stadium

2013 Big 12 Conference football standings
	Conf.			Overall
Team	W		L	W		L
No. 13 Baylor $	8	–	1	11	–	2
No. 6 Oklahoma %	7	–	2	11	–	2
No. 17 Oklahoma State	7	–	2	10	–	3
Texas	7	–	2	8	–	5
Kansas State	5	–	4	8	–	5
Texas Tech	4	–	5	8	–	5
TCU	2	–	7	4	–	8
West Virginia	2	–	7	4	–	8
Iowa State	2	–	7	3	–	9
Kansas	1	–	8	3	–	9
$ – BCS representative as conference champion; % – BCS at-large representative; Rankings from AP Poll

The 2013 Iowa State Cyclones football team represented Iowa State University as a member of Big 12 Conference during the 2013 NCAA Division I FBS football season. Led by fifth-year head coach Paul Rhoads, the Cyclones compiled an overall record of 3–9 with a mark of 2–7 in conference play, placing in a three-way tie for seventh the Big 12. The team played home games at Jack Trice Stadium in Ames, Iowa.

The Cyclones played in record setting temperatures: the hottest Jack Trice Stadium game at 92 °F (33 °C) against Northern Iowa on August 31, and the coldest Jack Trice Stadium game at 8 °F (−13 °C) for kickoff and 3 °F (−16 °C) by the start of the second half against Kansas on November 23.

On December 1, 2013, offensive coordinator Courtney Messingham and running backs coach Kenith Pope were fired from their positions.

== Schedule ==
Date	Time	Opponent	Site	TV	Result	Attendance	Source
August 31	7:00 p.m.	No. 17 (FCS) Northern Iowa*	Jack Trice Stadium; Ames, IA	Cyclones.tv	L 20–28	56,800	
September 14	5:00 p.m.	Iowa*	Jack Trice Stadium; Ames, IA (rivalry) (Battle for the Cy-Hawk Trophy)	FS1	L 21–27	56,800	
September 26	6:30 p.m.	at Tulsa*	Skelly Field at H. A. Chapman Stadium; Tulsa, OK	FS1	W 38–21	20,137	
October 3	6:30 p.m.	Texas	Jack Trice Stadium; Ames, IA	ESPN	L 30–31	52,762	
October 12	11:00 a.m.	at No. 20 Texas Tech	Jones AT&T Stadium; Lubbock, TX	FS1	L 35–42	57,367	
October 19	6:00 p.m.	at No. 12 Baylor	Floyd Casey Stadium; Waco, TX	ESPNU	L 7–71	46,825	
October 26	11:00 a.m.	No. 19 Oklahoma State	Jack Trice Stadium; Ames, IA	FSN	L 27–58	56,800	
November 2	2:30 p.m.	at Kansas State	Bill Snyder Family Football Stadium; Manhattan, KS (rivalry)	FS1	L 7–41	52,542	
November 9	11:00 a.m.	TCU^{†}	Jack Trice Stadium; Ames, IA	FSN	L 17–21	54,922	
November 16	11:00 a.m.	at No. 22 Oklahoma	Gaylord Family Oklahoma Memorial Stadium; Norman, OK	FS1	L 10–48	84,776	
November 23	7:00 p.m.	Kansas	Jack Trice Stadium; Ames, IA	FS1	W 34–0	54,081	
November 30	3:00 p.m.	at West Virginia	Milan Puskar Stadium; Morgantown, WV	FS1	W 52–44 ^{3OT}	33,735	
*Non-conference game; ^{†}Homecoming; Rankings from AP Poll released prior to the game; All times are in Central time

== Game summaries ==
=== Game 1: vs. Northern Iowa Panthers ===
Game One: Northern Iowa Panthers at Iowa State Cyclones – Game summary

Quarter	1	2	3	4	Total
Panthers	7	14	0	7	28
Cyclones	7	7	6	0	20

at Jack Trice Stadium, Ames, IA

- Date: August 31
- Game time: 7:05 p.m. CDT
- Game weather: Temperature: 92 °F (33 °C) • Wind S 0–5 mph (0.0–8.0 km/h) • Weather: Clear skies
- Game attendance: 56,800
- Referee: Referee: Randy Christal • Umpire: Jim Adams • Linesman: George Shoup • Line judge: Kelly Deterding • Back judge: Terry Jones • Field judge: Joe Blubaugh • Side judge: Freeman Johns

Game information

First quarter

- UNI – 06:13 David Johnson 37 yd run, Tyler Sievertson XP good (UNI 7–0)
- ISU – 03:37 Justin Coleman 59 yd pass from Sam B. Richardson, Edwin Arceo XP good (Tied 7–7)

Second quarter

- UNI – 14:55 David Johnson 9 yd pass from Sawyer Kollmorgen, Tyler Sievertson XP good (UNI 14–7)
- UNI – 06:52 David Johnson 27 yd run, Tyler Sievertson XP good (UNI 21–7)
- ISU – 03:45 James White 7 yd pass from Sam B. Richardson, Edwin Arceo XP good (UNI 21–14)

Third quarter

- ISU – 05:50 Cole Netten 23 yd field goal good (UNI 21–17)
- ISU – 04:19 Cole Netten 38 yd field goal good (UNI 21–20)

Fourth quarter

- UNI – 13:00 David Johnson 29 yd pass from Sawyer Kollmorgen, Tyler Sievertson XP good (UNI 28–20)

Top passers

- UNI – Sawyer Kollmorgen 21/28, 218 yards, 2 TD
- ISU – Sam B. Richardson 22/32, 242 yards, 2 TD

Top rushers

- UNI – David Johnson 23 attempts, 199 yards, 2 TD
- ISU – Sam B. Richardson 21 attempts, 74 yards

Top receivers

- UNI – Kevin Vereen 7 receptions, 68 yards
- ISU – Justin Coleman 4 receptions, 103 yards, 1 TD

Top tacklers

- UNI – Jake Farley 12 tackles
- ISU – Sam E. Richardson 13 tackles

=== Game 2: vs. Iowa Hawkeyes ===
Game Two: Iowa Hawkeyes at Iowa State Cyclones – Game summary

Quarter	1	2	3	4	Total
Hawkeyes	0	13	7	7	27
Cyclones	0	0	7	14	21

at Jack Trice Stadium, Ames, IA

- Date: September 14
- Game time: 5:06 p.m. CDT
- Game weather: Temperature: 75 °F (24 °C) • Wind S 5–10 mph (8.0–16.1 km/h) • Weather: Partly cloudy
- Game attendance: 56,800
- Referee: Referee: Bill LeMonnier • Umpire: Steven Woods • Linesman: Michael Dolce • Line judge: Rick Kruger • Back judge: Shawn Smith • Field judge: Joel Clay • Side judge: Scot McElwee
- TV announcers (FS1): Justin Kutcher (Play-by-play), James Bates (Color), & Brady Poppinga (Sideline)

Game information

Second quarter

- IOWA – 12:07 Kevonte Martin-Manley 5 yd pass from Jake Rudock, Mike Meyer XP good (IOWA 7–0)
- IOWA – 01:43 Mike Meyer 27 yd field goal good (IOWA 10–0)
- IOWA – 00:10 Mike Meyer 38 yd field goal good (IOWA 13–0)

Third quarter

- ISU – 05:28 Quenton Bundrage 67 yd pass from Sam B. Richardson, Cole Netten XP good (IOWA 13–7)
- IOWA – 00:41 Jacob Hillyer 26 yd pass from Jake Rudock, Mike Meyer XP good (IOWA 20–7)

Fourth quarter

- IOWA – 07:05 Jake Rudock 1 yd run, Mike Meyer XP good (IOWA 27–7)
- ISU – 04:27 Quenton Bundrage 26 yd pass from Sam B. Richardson, Cole Netten XP good (IOWA 27–14)
- ISU – 02:26 Quenton Bundrage 17 yd pass from Sam B. Richardson, Cole Netten XP good (IOWA 27–21)

Top passers

- IOWA – Jake Rudock 14/23, 160 yards, 2 TD
- ISU – Sam B. Richardson 22/39, 260 yards, 3 TD, 2 INT

Top rushers

- IOWA – Mark Weisman 35 attempts, 145 yards
- ISU – James White 5 attempts, 26 yards

Top receivers

- IOWA – Kevonte Martin-Manley 7 receptions, 60 yards, 1 TD
- ISU – Quenton Bundrage 7 receptions, 146 yards, 3 TD

Top tacklers

- IOWA – Christian Kirksey 11 tackles
- ISU – Jacques Washington 13 tackles

=== Game 3: at Tulsa Golden Hurricane ===
Game Three: Iowa State Cyclones at Tulsa Golden Hurricane – Game summary

Quarter	1	2	3	4	Total
Cyclones	7	7	14	10	38
Golden Hurricane	0	14	0	7	21

at Chapman Stadium, Tulsa, OK

- Date: September 26
- Game time: 6:35 p.m. CDT
- Game weather: Temperature: 90 °F (32 °C) • Wind SE 12 mph (19 km/h) • Weather: Clear skies
- Game attendance: 20,137
- Referee: Referee: Brad Rogers • Umpire: Dongray Johnson • Linesman: Maia Chaka • Line judge: Adam Savoie • Back judge: Tom Fimmen • Field judge: Eric Steen • Side judge: Chris Bynum
- TV announcers (FS1): Justin Kutcher (Play-by-play), Joel Klatt (Color), Petros Papadakis (Color) & Kristina Pink (Sideline)

Game information

First quarter

- ISU – 06:31 Jeff Woody 1 yd run, Cole Netten XP good (ISU 7–0)

Second quarter

- TUL – 04:58 Trey Watts 1 yd run, Carl Salazar XP good (Tied 7–7)
- TUL – 01:33 Thomas Roberson 9 yd pass from Cody Green, Carl Salazar XP good (TUL 14–7)
- ISU – 00:15 Jarvis West 10 yd pass from Sam B. Richardson, Cole Netten XP good (Tied 14–14)

Third quarter

- ISU – 12:36 E. J. Bibbs 16 yd pass from Sam B. Richardson, Cole Netten XP good (ISU 21–14)
- ISU – 03:16 Jeff Woody 1 yd run, Cole Netten XP good (ISU 28–14)

Fourth quarter

- ISU – 10:53 Cole Netten 40 yd field goal good (ISU 31–14)
- TUL – 08:16 Thomas Roberson 21 yd pass from Cody Green, Carl Salazar XP good (ISU 31–21)
- ISU – 01:48 Jeff Woody 1 yd run, Cole Netten XP good (ISU 38–21)

Top passers

- ISU – Sam B. Richardson 26/41, 255 yards, 2 TD, 1 INT
- TUL – Cody Green 18/31, 237 yards, 2 TD, 1 INT

Top rushers

- ISU – Aaron Wimberly 19 attempts, 137 yards
- TUL – Trey Watts 14 attempts, 38 yards, 1 TD

Top receivers

- ISU – Tad Ecby 6 receptions, 59 yards
- TUL – Jordan James 8 receptions, 86 yards

Top tacklers

- ISU – Jeremiah George 12 tackles
- TUL – Shawn Jackson 14 tackles

=== Game 4: vs. Texas Longhorns ===
Game Four: Texas Longhorns at Iowa State Cyclones – Game summary

Quarter	1	2	3	4	Total
Longhorns	10	7	7	7	31
Cyclones	0	13	7	10	30

at Jack Trice Stadium, Ames, IA

- Date: October 3
- Game time: 6:31 p.m. CDT
- Game weather: Temperature: 79 °F (26 °C) • Wind SSW 0–5 mph (0.0–8.0 km/h) • Weather: Mostly cloudy
- Game attendance: 52,762
- Referee: Referee: Mike Defee • Umpire: Robert Richeson • Linesman: Al Green • Line judge: Walt Coleman IV • Back judge: Terry White • Field judge: Mike Cuttone • Side judge: Tim Murray
- TV announcers (ESPN): Rece Davis (Play-by-play), Jesse Palmer (Color), David Pollack (Color) & Samantha Ponder (Sideline)

Game information

First quarter

- TEX – 12:06 Johnathan Gray 45 yd run, Anthony Fera XP good (TEX 7–0)
- TEX – 02:27 Anthony Fera 29 yd field goal good (TEX 10–0)

Second quarter

- ISU – 14:21 Cole Netten 37 yd field goal good (TEX 10–3)
- ISU – 04:34 Aaron Wimberly 11 yd pass from Sam B. Richardson, Cole Netten XP good (Tied 10–10)
- ISU – 00:33 Cole Netten 41 yd field goal good (ISU 13–10)
- TEX – 00:00 John Harris 44 yd pass from Case McCoy, Anthony Fera XP good (TEX 17–13)

Third quarter

- ISU – 06:34 Quenton Bundrage 97 yd pass from Sam B. Richardson, Cole Netten XP good (ISU 20–17)
- TEX – 04:30 Joe Bergeron 6 yd run, Anthony Fera XP good (TEX 24–20)

Fourth quarter

- ISU – 11:37 Aaron Wimberly 20 yd run, Cole Netten XP good (ISU 27–24)
- ISU – 03:40 Cole Netten 29 yd field goal good (ISU 30–24)
- TEX – 00:51 Casy McCoy 1 yd run, Anthony Fera XP good (TEX 31–30)

Top passers

- TEX – Case McCoy 26/45, 244 yards, 1 TD
- ISU – Sam B. Richardson 16/26, 262 yards, 2 TD, 1 INT

Top rushers

- TEX – Johnathan Gray 16 attempts, 89 yards, 1 TD
- ISU – Aaron Wimberly 29 attempts, 117 yards, 1 TD

Top receivers

- TEX – Mike Davis 6 receptions, 64 yards
- ISU – Quenton Bundrage 5 receptions, 137 yards, 1 TD

Top tacklers

- TEX – Dalton Santos 12 tackles
- ISU – Jeremiah George 13 tackles

=== Game 5: at Texas Tech Red Raiders ===
Game Five: Iowa State Cyclones at Texas Tech Red Raiders – Game summary

Quarter	1	2	3	4	Total
Cyclones	7	14	0	14	35
Red Raiders	14	7	7	14	42

at Jones AT&T Stadium, Lubbock, TX

- Date: October 12
- Game time: 11:05 a.m. CDT
- Game weather: Temperature: 60 °F (16 °C) • Wind NNE 10 mph (16 km/h) • Weather: Clear
- Game attendance: 57,367
- Referee: Referee: Rick Lourniet • Umpire: Jim Adams • Linesman: Bill Scott • Line judge: Keith Garmond • Back judge: Donnie Aultman • Field judge: Jason Ledet • Side judge: Mike Contreraz
- TV announcers (FS1): Eric Collins (Play-by-play), James Bates (Color), & Brady Poppinga (Sideline)

Game information

First quarter

- TTU – 06:31 Jakeem Grant 33 yd pass from Davis Webb, Ryan Bustin XP good (TTU 7–0)
- ISU – 06:17 Jarvis West 95 kickoff return, Cole Netten XP good (Tied 7–7)
- TTU – 01:25 Eric Ward 4 yd pass from Davis Webb, Ryan Bustin XP good (TTU 14–7)

Second quarter

- ISU – 09:10 Aaron Wimberly 4 yd run, Cole Netten XP good (Tied 14–14)
- TTU – 06:26 Kenny Williams 1 yd run, Ryan Bustin XP good (TTU 21–14)
- ISU – 02:57 Jeff Woody 3 yd run, Cole Netten XP good (Tied 21–21)

Third quarter

- TTU – 07:01 Brad Marquez 12 yd pass from Davis Webb, Ryan Bustin XP good (TTU 28–21)

Fourth quarter

- TTU – 12:06 DeAndre Washington 12 yd run, Ryan Bustin XP good (TTU 35–21)
- ISU – 10:40 Shontrelle Johnson 3 yd run, Cole Netten XP good (TTU 35–28)
- TTU – 05:30 SaDale Foster 38 yd run, Ryan Bustin XP good (TTU 42–28)
- ISU – 01:54 E. J. Bibbs 16 yd pass from Sam B. Richardson, Cole Netten XP good (TTU 42–35)

Top passers

- ISU – Sam B. Richardson 15/38, 168 yards, 1 TD
- TTU – Davis Webb 35/56, 415 yards, 3 TD, 1 INT

Top rushers

- ISU – Aaron Wimberly 19 attempts, 65 yards, 1 TD
- TTU – DeAndre Washington 13 attempts, 88 yards, 1 TD

Top receivers

- ISU – Quenton Bundrage 5 receptions, 52 yards
- TTU – Jace Amaro 9 receptions, 143 yards

Top tacklers

- ISU – Jacques Washington 12 tackles
- TTU – Kerry Hyder 9 tackles

=== Game 6: at Baylor Bears ===
Game Six: Iowa State Cyclones at Baylor Bears – Game summary

Quarter	1	2	3	4	Total
Cyclones	0	0	0	7	7
Bears	17	20	14	20	71

at Floyd Casey Stadium, Waco, TX

- Date: October 19
- Game time: 6:02 p.m. CDT
- Game weather: Temperature: 64 °F (18 °C) • Wind NE 10 mph (16 km/h) • Weather: Clear skies
- Game attendance: 46,825
- Referee: Referee: Dan Romeo • Umpire: Scott Teifer • Linesman: Rick Smith • Line judge: Marc Bovos • Back judge: Chris Alston • Field judge: Bobby Bernard • Side judge: Craig Faulkner
- TV announcers (ESPNU): Clay Matvick (Play-by-play), Matt Stinchcomb (Color), & Dawn Davenport (Sideline)

Game information

First quarter

- BAY – 09:28 Antwan Goodley 4 yd pass from Bryce Petty, Aaron Jones XP good (BAY 7–0)
- BAY – 08:28 Lache Seastrunk 3 yd run, Aaron Jones XP good (BAY 14–0)
- BAY – 02:54 Aaron Jones 22 yd field goal good (BAY 17–0)

Second quarter

- BAY – 08:59 Aaron Jones 21 yd field goal good (BAY 20–0)
- BAY – 04:54 Lache Seastrunk 2 yd run, Aaron Jones XP good (BAY 27–0)
- BAY – 01:37 Antwan Goodley 36 yd pass from Bryce Petty, Aaron Jones XP good (BAY 34–0)
- BAY – 00:00 Aaron Jones 51 yd field goal good (BAY 37–0)

Third quarter

- BAY – 09:16 Bryce Petty 6 yd run, Aaron Jones XP good (BAY 44–0)
- BAY – 01:08 Levi Norwood 52 punt return, Aaron Jones XP good (BAY 51–0)

Fourth quarter

- BAY – 12:50 Seth Russell 40 yd run, Kyle Peterson XP good (BAY 58–0)
- BAY – 03:48 Devin Chafin 21 yd run, Kyle Peterson XP blocked (BAY 64–0)
- ISU – 00:47 DeVondrick Nealy 27 yd pass from Grant Rohach, Cole Netten XP good (BAY 64–7)
- BAY – 00:34 Corey Coleman 97 kickoff return, Kyle Peterson XP good (BAY 71–7)

Top passers

- ISU – Sam B. Richardson 7/14, 68 yards, 1 INT
- BAY – Bryce Petty 23/31, 343 yards, 2 TD

Top rushers

- ISU – Aaron Wimberly 5 attempts, 21 yards
- BAY – Lache Seastrunk 18 attempts, 112 yards, 2 TD

Top receivers

- ISU – DeVondrick Nealy 2 receptions, 32 yards, 1 TD
- BAY – Antwan Goodley 11 receptions, 182 yards, 2 TD

Top tacklers

- ISU – Jeremiah George 18 tackles
- BAY – Eddie Lackey 8 tackles

=== Game 7: vs. Oklahoma State Cowboys ===
Game Seven: Oklahoma State Cowboys at Iowa State Cyclones – Game summary

Quarter	1	2	3	4	Total
Cowboys	21	7	17	13	58
Cyclones	7	13	0	7	27

at Jack Trice Stadium, Ames, IA

- Date: October 26
- Game time: 11:06 a.m. CDT
- Game weather: Temperature: 42 °F (6 °C) • Wind NNW 10–20 mph (16–32 km/h) • Weather: Partly sunny
- Game attendance: 56,800
- Referee: Referee: Alan Eck • Umpire: Jim Adams • Linesman: Brad Edwards • Line judge: David Oliver • Back judge: Brad Van Vark • Field judge: Scott Gaines • Side judge: Anthony Flemming
- TV announcers (FSN): Mark Followill (Play-by-play), Brian Baldinger (Color), & J. C. Pearson (Sideline)

Game information

First quarter

- OSU – 11:02 Desmond Roland 2 yd run, Ben Grogan XP good (OSU 7–0)
- OSU – 10:20 Justin Gilbert 31 yd interception return, Ben Grogan XP good (OSU 14–0)
- OSU – 05:45 Charlie Moore 8 yd pass from Clint Chelf, Ben Grogan XP good (OSU 21–0)
- ISU – 02:58 Quenton Bundrage 22 yd pass from Sam B. Richardson, Cole Netten XP good (OSU 21–7)

Second quarter

- OSU – 14:57 Desmond Roland 6 yd run, Ben Grogan XP good (OSU 28–7)
- ISU – 12:23 DeVondrick Nealy 11 yd run, Cole Netten XP good (OSU 28–14)
- ISU – 02:59 Quenton Bundrage 20 yd pass from Grant Rohach, Cole Netten XP blocked (OSU 28–20)

Third quarter

- OSU – 08:32 Ben Grogan 22 yd field goal good (OSU 31–20)
- OSU – 06:38 Desmond Roland 58 yd run, Ben Grogan XP good (OSU 38–20)
- OSU – 04:17 Tyler Johnson 54 fumble recovery, Ben Grogan XP good (OSU 45–20)

Fourth quarter

- OSU – 10:28 Desmond Roland 3 yd run, Ben Grogan XP good (OSU 52–20)
- ISU – 07:10 Jeff Woody 1 yd run, Cole Netten XP good (OSU 52–27)
- OSU – 04:59 Jeremy Smith 1 yd run, Ben Grogan XP blocked (OSU 58–27)

Top passers

- OSU – Clint Chelf 10/26, 78 yards, 1 TD, 1 INT
- ISU – Grant Rolach 12/23, 97 yards, 1 TD

Top rushers

- OSU – Desmond Roland 26 attempts, 219 yards, 4 TD
- ISU – Sam B. Richardson 11 attempts, 64 yards

Top receivers

- OSU – Tracy Moore 3 receptions, 37 yards
- ISU – E. J. Bibbs 3 receptions, 53 yards

Top tacklers

- OSU – Ryan Simmons 11 tackles
- ISU – Jeremiah George 12 tackles

=== Game 8: at Kansas State Wildcats ===
Game Eight: Iowa State Cyclones at Kansas State Wildcats – Game summary

Quarter	1	2	3	4	Total
Cyclones	0	0	0	7	7
Wildcats	10	7	3	21	41

at Bill Snyder Family Football Stadium, Manhattan, KS

- Date: November 2
- Game time: 2:35 p.m. CDT
- Game weather: Temperature: 55 °F (13 °C) • Wind NNW 5 mph (8.0 km/h) • Weather: Sunny
- Game attendance: 52,542
- Referee: Referee: Greg Burks • Umpire: Scott Campbell • Linesman: Tim Crowley • Line judge: Matt Stellges • Back judge: Brian Ernest • Field judge: Randy Smith • Side judge: Gene Semko
- TV announcers (FS1): Justin Kutcher (Play-by-play), James Bates (Color), & Brady Poppinga (Sideline)

Game information

First quarter

- KSU – 08:40 John Hubert 9 yd run, Jack Cantele XP good (KSU 7–0)
- KSU – 04:41 Jack Cantele 44 yd field goal good (KSU 10–0)

Second quarter

- KSU – 00:41 Daniel Sams 1 yd run, Jack Cantele XP good (KSU 17–0)

Third quarter

- KSU – 10:14 Jack Cantele 42 yd field goal good (KSU 20–0)

Fourth quarter

- KSU – 10:57 John Hubert 3 yd run, Jack Cantele XP good (KSU 27–0)
- KSU – 07:06 Tramaine Thompson 28 yd pass from Daniel Sams, Jack Cantele XP good (KSU 34–0)
- KSU – 05:16 Robert Rose 9 yd run, Jack Cantele XP good (KSU 41–0)
- ISU – 03:24 DeVondrick Nealy 10 yd run, Cole Netten XP good (KSU 41–7)

Top passers

- ISU – Grant Rolach 11/24, 88 yards, 2 INT
- KSU – Jake Waters 9/15, 157 yards

Top rushers

- ISU – DeVondrick Nealy 12 attempts, 53 yards, 1 TD
- KSU – John Hubert 15 attempts, 105 yards, 2 TD

Top receivers

- ISU – Dondre Daley 4 receptions, 26 yards
- KSU – Tyler Lockett 5 receptions, 72 yards

Top tacklers

- ISU – Jeremiah George 12 tackles
- KSU – Blake Slaughter 7 tackles

=== Game 9: vs. TCU Horned Frogs ===
Game Nine: TCU Horned Frogs at Iowa State Cyclones – Game summary

Quarter	1	2	3	4	Total
Horned Frogs	7	7	0	7	21
Cyclones	0	7	10	0	17

at Jack Trice Stadium, Ames, IA

- Date: November 9
- Game time: 11:05 a.m. CST
- Game weather: Temperature: 50 °F (10 °C) • Wind NW 10–15 mph (16–24 km/h) • Weather: Clear skies
- Game attendance: 54,922
- Referee: Referee: Randy Christal • Umpire: Jim Adams • Linesman: Cal McNeill • Line judge: Kelly Deterding • Back judge: Terry Jones • Field judge: Joe Blubaugh • Side judge: Freeman Johns
- TV announcers (FSN): Mike Morgan (Play-by-play), Brian Baldinger (Color), & J. C. Pearson (Sideline)

Game information

First quarter

- TCU – 05:09 Trevone Boykin 18 yd run, Jaden Oberkrom XP good (TCU 7–0)

Second quarter

- ISU – 12:44 Sam B. Richardson 15 yd run, Cole Netten XP good (Tied 7–7)
- TCU – 09:51 Trevone Boykin 3 yd run, Jaden Oberkrom XP good (TCU 14–7)

Third quarter

- ISU – 14:46 DeVondrick Nealy 98 kickoff return, Cole Netten XP good (Tied 14–14)
- ISU – 01:33 Cole Netten 35 yd field goal good (ISU 17–14)

Fourth quarter

- TCU – 00:38 Trevone Boykin 1 yd run, Jaden Oberkrom XP good (TCU 21–17)

Top passers

- TCU – Casey Pachall 20/36, 245 yards, 2 INT
- ISU – Grant Rolach 18/38, 148 yards

Top rushers

- TCU – Aaron Green 19 attempts, 72 yards
- ISU – Shontrelle Johnson 11 attempts, 39 yards

Top receivers

- TCU – Brandon Carter 6 receptions, 93 yards
- ISU – E. J. Bibbs 7 receptions, 63 yards

Top tacklers

- TCU – Paul Dawson 14 tackles
- ISU – Jeremiah George 9 tackles

=== Game 10: at Oklahoma Sooners ===
Game Ten: Iowa State Cyclones at Oklahoma Sooners – Game summary

Quarter	1	2	3	4	Total
Cyclones	0	10	0	0	10
Sooners	0	10	17	21	48

at Gaylord Family Oklahoma Memorial Stadium, Norman, OK

- Date: November 16
- Game time: 11:00 a.m. CST
- Game weather: Temperature: 64 °F (18 °C) • Wind S 25 mph (40 km/h) • Weather: Partly Cloudy
- Game attendance: 84,776
- Referee: Referee: Dan Romeo • Umpire: Jim Adams • Linesman: Rick Smith • Line judge: Marc Bovos • Back judge: Chris Alston • Field judge: Bobby Bernard • Side judge: Craig Faulkner
- TV announcers (FS1): Adam Alexander (Play-by-play) & Chris Simms (Color)

Game information

Second Quarter

- ISU – 14:18 Sam B. Richardson 4 yd run, Cole Netten XP good (ISU 7–0)
- OU – 07:32 Michael Hunnicutt 22 yd field goal (ISU 7–3)
- ISU – 05:52 Cole Netten 29 yd field goal (ISU 10–3)
- OU – 01:09 Jalen Saunders 91 yd punt return, Michael Hunnicutt XP good (Tied 10–10)

Third Quarter

- OU – 14:17 Damien Williams 69 yd run, Michael Hunnicutt XP good (OU 17–10)
- OU – 07:50 Michael Hunnicutt 32 yd field goal (OU 20–10)
- OU – 03:59 Brennan Clay 63 yd run, Michael Hunnicutt XP good (OU 27–10)

Fourth Quarter

- OU – 14:49 Trevor Knight 56 yd run, Michael Hunnicutt XP good (OU 34–10)
- OU – 09:32 Damien Williams 19 yd run, Michael Hunnicutt XP good (OU 41–10)
- OU – 03:56 Aaron Ripkowski 3 yd pass from Kendal Thompson, Michael Hunnicutt XP good (OU 48–10)

Top Passers

- ISU – Grant Rohach 21/34, 179 yards, 2 INT
- OU – Trevor Knight 8/14, 61 yards

Top Rushers

- ISU – Aaron Wimberly 13 attempts, 50 yards
- OU – Damien Williams 10 attempts, 128 yards, 2 TD

Top Receiving

- ISU – Quenton Bundrage 6 Receptions, 66 yards
- OU – LaColtan Bester 4 Receptions, 75 yards

Top Tackler

- ISU – Jacques Washington 13 tackles
- OU – Dominique Alexander 11 tackles

=== Game 11: vs. Kansas Jayhawks ===
Game Eleven: Kansas Jayhawks at Iowa State Cyclones – Game summary

Quarter	1	2	3	4	Total
Jayhawks	0	0	0	0	0
Cyclones	7	3	17	7	34

at Jack Trice Stadium, Ames, IA

- Date: November 23
- Game time: 7:05 p.m. CST
- Game weather: Temperature: 8 °F (−13 °C) • Wind: Calm • Weather: Clear Skies
- Game attendance: 54,081
- Referee: Referee: Scott Novak • Umpire: Tab Slaughter • Linesman: Doug Moore • Line judge: Kevin Vicknair • Back judge: Lyndon Nixon • Field judge: Nick Lave • Side judge: Eugene Hall
- TV announcers (FS1): Adam Alexander (Play-by-play) & Chris Simms (Color)

Game information

First Quarter

- ISU – 06:43 Aaron Wimberly 58 yd pass from Grant Rohach, Cole Netten XP good (ISU 7–0)

Second Quarter

- ISU – 13:06 Cole Netten 22 yd field goal (ISU 10–0)

Third Quarter

- ISU – 09:56 Cole Netten 21 yd field goal (ISU 13–0)
- ISU – 06:00 Quenton Bundrage 15 yd pass from Grant Rohach, Cole Netten XP good (ISU 20–0)
- ISU – 01:09 James White 5 yd run, Cole Netten XP good (ISU 27–0)

Fourth Quarter

- ISU – 10:50 Shontrelle Johnson 23 yd run, Cole Netten XP good (ISU 34–0)

Top Passers

- KU – Jake Heaps 7/19, 72 yards
- ISU – Grant Rohach 15/20, 300 yards, 2 TD, 1 INT

Top Rushers

- KU – James Sims 21 attempts, 114 yards
- ISU – Shontrelle Johnson 13 attempts, 84 yards, 1 TD

Top Receiving

- KU – Connor Embree 2 Receptions, 22 yards
- ISU – Justin Coleman 8 Receptions, 78 yards

Top Tackler

- KU – Jake Love 13 tackles
- ISU – Jeremiah George 14 tackles

=== Game 12: at West Virginia Mountaineers ===
Game Twelve: Iowa State Cyclones at West Virginia Mountaineers – Game summary

Quarter	1	2	3	4	OT	2OT	3OT	Total
Cyclones	7	7	0	24	3	3	8	52
Mountaineers	17	14	0	7	3	3	0	44

at Mountaineer Field, Morgantown, WV

- Date: November 30
- Game time: 3:05 p.m. CST
- Game weather: Temperature: 45 °F (7 °C) • Wind S 5 mph (8.0 km/h) • Weather: Mostly Sunny
- Game attendance: 33,735
- Referee: Referee: Reggie Smith • Umpire: Michael Cooper • Linesman: Mike Moeller • Line judge: Frank LeBlanc • Back judge: Terry Jones • Field judge: Jack G. Taylor III • Side judge: Tim Murray
- TV announcers (FS1): Adam Alexander (Play-by-play) & Chris Simms (Color)

Game information

First quarter

- WVU – 11:36 Josh Lambert 49 yd field goal (WVU 3–0)
- WVU – 04:16 Charles Sims 7 yd run, Josh Lambert XP good (WVU 10–0)
- WVU – 03:57 Karl Joseph 38 yd fumble recovery, Josh Lambert XP good (WVU 17–0)
- ISU – 01:19 Grant Rohach 54 yd run, Cole Netten XP good (WVU 17–7)

Second quarter

- WVU – 14:55 Kevin White 17 yd pass from Clint Trickett, Josh Lambert XP good (WVU 24–7)
- WVU – 09:05 Charles Sims 76 yd run, Josh Lambert XP good (WVU 31–7)
- ISU – 07:23 Quenton Bundrage 10 yd pass from Grant Rohach, Cole Netten XP good (WVU 31–14)

Third quarter
Fourth quarter

- ISU – 14:00 Shontrelle Johnson 3 yd run, Cole Netten XP good (WVU 31–21)
- WVU – 13:42 Mario Alford 76 yd pass from Clint Trickett, Josh Lambert XP good (WVU 38–21)
- ISU – 09:38 Quenton Bundrage 62 yd pass from Grant Rohach, Cole Netten XP good (WVU 38–28)
- ISU – 04:21 Cole Netten 31 yd field goal (WVU 38–31)
- ISU – 01:00 Justin Coleman 19 yd pass from Grant Rohach, Cole Netten XP good (Tied 38–38)

First overtime

- ISU – 15:00 Cole Netten 40 yd field goal (ISU 41–38)
- WVU – 15:00 Josh Lambert 41 yd field goal (Tied 41–41)

Second overtime

- WVU – 15:00 Josh Lambert 26 yd field goal (WVU 44–41)
- ISU – 15:00 Cole Netten 26 yd field goal (Tied 44–44)

Third overtime

- ISU – 15:00 Justin Coleman 25 yd pass from Grant Rohach, E. J. Bibbs pass from Grant Rohach (ISU 52–44)

Top passers

- ISU – Grant Rohach 25/39, 331 yards, 4 TD, 1 INT
- WVU – Clint Trickett 21/37, 356 yards, 2 TD, 2 INT

Top rushers

- ISU – Shontrelle Johnson 18 attempts, 72 yards, 1 TD
- WVU – Charles Sims 24 attempts, 149 yards, 2 TD

Top receivers

- ISU – Quenton Bundrage 7 receptions, 93 yards, 2 TD
- WVU – Mario Alford 8 receptions, 215 yards, 1 TD

Top tacklers

- ISU – Jacques Washington 8 tackles
- WVU – Nick Kwiatkoski 14 tackles

== Personnel ==
=== Coaching staff ===
Name	Position	Seasons at Iowa State	Alma mater
Paul Rhoads	Head coach	5	Missouri Western (1989)
Wally Burnham	Defensive coordinator/linebackers	5	Samford (1963)
Courtney Messingham	Offensive coordinator/quarterbacks	5	Northern Iowa (1990)
Kenith Pope	Running Backs	5	Oklahoma (1976)
Troy Douglas	Defensive Backs	2	Appalachian State (1986)
Bill Bleil	Assistant head coach/Tight Ends	5	Northwestern College (1981)
Todd Sturdy	Wide receivers, Passing Game Coordinator	3	St. Ambrose (1990)
Curtis Bray	Defensive line	5	Pittsburgh (1992)
Chris Klenakis	Offensive line	0	Carrol (MT)
