= Charles Sims (American football) =

American football player (born 1990)

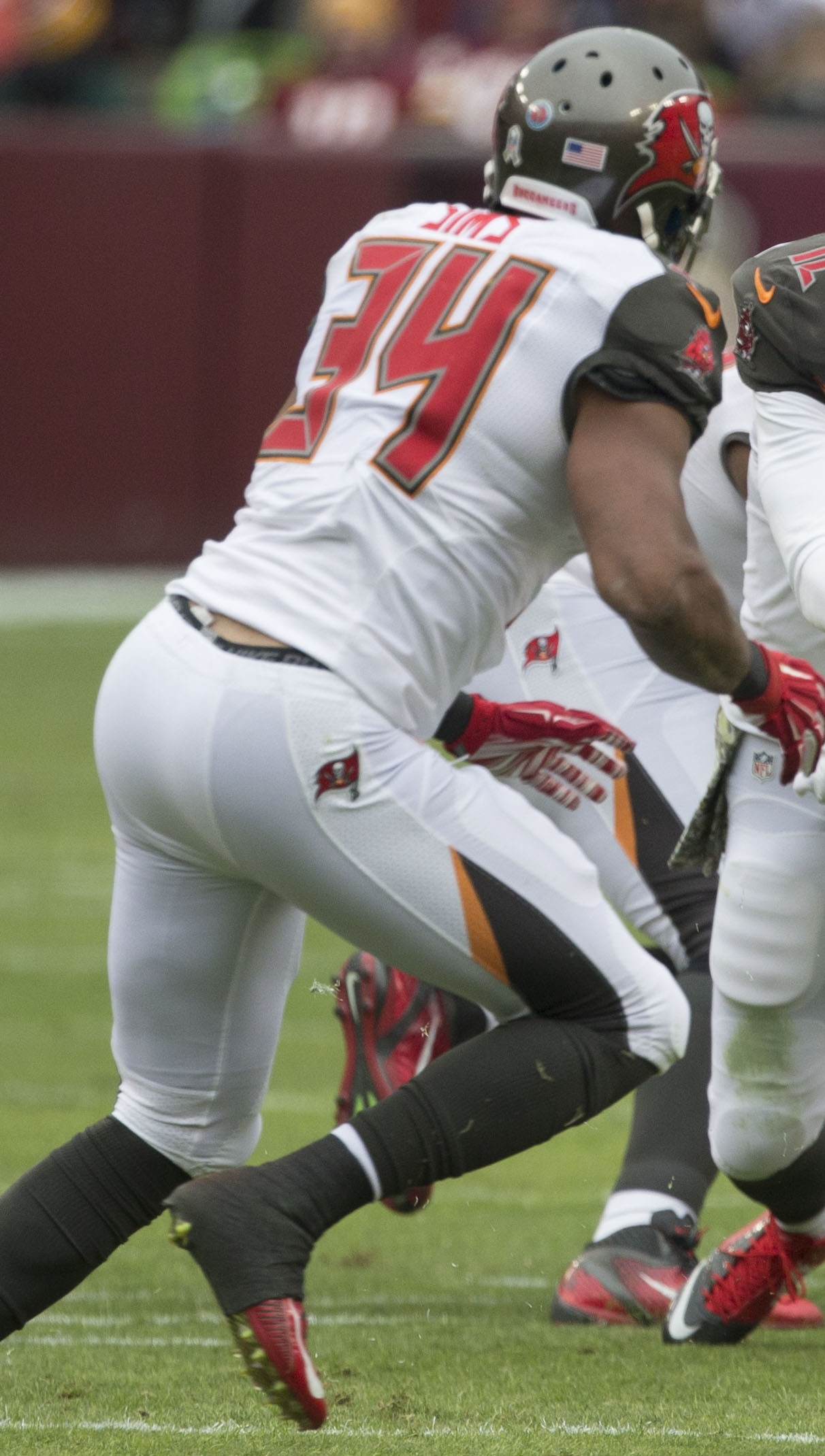
- Sims with the Tampa Bay Buccaneers in 2014

No. 34
- Position: Running back

Personal information
- Born: September 19, 1990 (age 36); Houston, Texas, U.S.
- Listed height: 6 ft 0 in (1.83 m)
- Listed weight: 214 lb (97 kg)

Career information
- High school: Westbury (Houston)
- College: Houston (2009–2012); West Virginia (2013)
- NFL draft: 2014: 3rd round, 69th overall pick

Career history
- Tampa Bay Buccaneers (2014–2017)

Awards and highlights
- Big 12 Offensive Newcomer of the Year (2013); First-team All-Big 12 (2013); First-team All-C-USA (2011); Second-team All-C-USA (2012); C-USA Freshman of the Year (2009)

Career NFL statistics
- Rushing attempts: 245
- Rushing yards: 958
- Receptions: 129
- Receiving yards: 1,190
- Total touchdowns: 8
- Stats at Pro Football Reference

Charles Edwards Sims (born September 19, 1990) is an American former professional football player who was a running back in the National Football League (NFL). He was selected by the Tampa Bay Buccaneers in the third round of the 2014 NFL draft. He played college football for the Houston Cougars and West Virginia Mountaineers.

== Early life ==
Sims attended Westbury High School in Houston, Texas, where he played football and ran track. He was named District 21-4A MVP and first-team All-District as a junior after rushing for 1,018 yards and 17 touchdowns, while adding 37 receptions for 425 yards and two scores. In track & field, Sims posted personal-bests of 11.15 seconds in the 100-meter dash and 6.70 meters (21-10.5) in the long jump.

Considered a three-star recruit by Rivals.com, Sims was rated as the 74th best running back prospect of his class.

== College career ==
Sims attended the University of Houston from 2009 to 2012, graduating in the spring. As a freshman, he was the Conference USA Freshman of the Year after rushing for 698 yards and nine touchdowns. He was redshirted in 2010 for academic reasons. He returned in 2011 and was a first-team All-Conference USA after rushing for 821 yards on 110 carries and nine touchdowns. During his final season at Houston in 2012, he was the Andre Ware Offensive MVP and a second-team All-Conference USA selection after rushing for 851 yards on 142 carries with 11 touchdowns.

For his senior year in 2013, Sims transferred to West Virginia University. He was named the team's starter before the season. He rushed for 1,095 yards on 208 carries (5.3 avg) and 11 touchdowns, while catching 45 passes for 401 yards and three touchdowns. He was named a first-team All-Big 12 Conference while adding the honor of Big 12 Offensive Newcomer of the Year.

== Professional career ==
Pre-draft measurables
Height	Weight	Arm length	Hand span	40-yard dash	10-yard split	20-yard shuttle	Three-cone drill	Vertical jump	Broad jump	Bench press
6 ft 0 in (1.83 m)	214 lb (97 kg)	31 in (0.79 m)	8 1/4 in (0.21 m)	4.48 s	1.56 s	4.30 s	7.16 s	37.5 in (0.95 m)	10 ft 6 in (3.20 m)	17 reps
All values from NFL Combine

Sims was considered one of the top running back prospects in the 2014 NFL draft. He was selected in the third round (69th overall) by the Tampa Bay Buccaneers. In the 2014 season, he finished with 66 carries for 185 yards to go along with 19 receptions for 190 yards. In the 2015 season, he finished with 107 carries for 529 rushing yards to go along with 51 receptions for 561 receiving yards and four receiving touchdowns.

On October 10, 2016, Sims was placed on injured reserve after suffering a knee injury in Week 4 against the Denver Broncos. He was activated off injured reserve on December 10, 2016 prior to Week 14. He was placed back on injured reserve on December 28, 2016. Overall, in the 2016 season, he finished with 51 rushes for 149 yards and a rushing touchdown to go along with 24 receptions for 190 receiving yards and a receiving touchdown. In the 2017 season, he finished with 21 carries for 95 yards to go along with 35 receptions for 249 receiving yards and a receiving touchdown.

On April 26, 2018, Sims re-signed with the Buccaneers on a one-year contract. On August 23, 2018, he was placed on injured reserve with a knee injury. On August 30, 2018, he was released with an injury settlement.

== Career statistics ==
=== NFL ===
Season	Team	Games		Rushing					Receiving					Fumbles	
Season	Team	GP	GS	Att	Yds	Avg	Lng	TD	Rec	Yds	Avg	Lng	TD	FUM	Lost
2014	Tampa Bay Buccaneers	8	0	66	185	2.8	20	1	19	190	10.0	24	0	2	1
2015	Tampa Bay Buccaneers	16	0	107	529	4.9	59	0	51	561	11.0	56	4	2	2
2016	Tampa Bay Buccaneers	7	2	51	149	2.9	23	1	24	190	7.9	33	1	1	1
2017	Tampa Bay Buccaneers	16	0	21	95	4.5	21	0	35	249	7.1	25	1	1	1
Total		47	2	245	958	3.9	59	2	129	1,190	9.2	56	6	6	5

=== College ===
		Rushing					Receiving		
Year	Team	Att	Yards	Avg	Long	TD	Rec	Yards	TD
2009	Houston	132	698	5.3	31	9	70	759	1
2011	Houston	110	821	7.5	72	9	51	575	4
2012	Houston	142	851	6.0	53	11	37	373	3
2013	West Virginia	208	1,095	5.3	76	11	45	401	3
Totals		592	3,465	5.9	76	40	203	2,108	11
