= Jason Verrett =

American football player (born 1991)

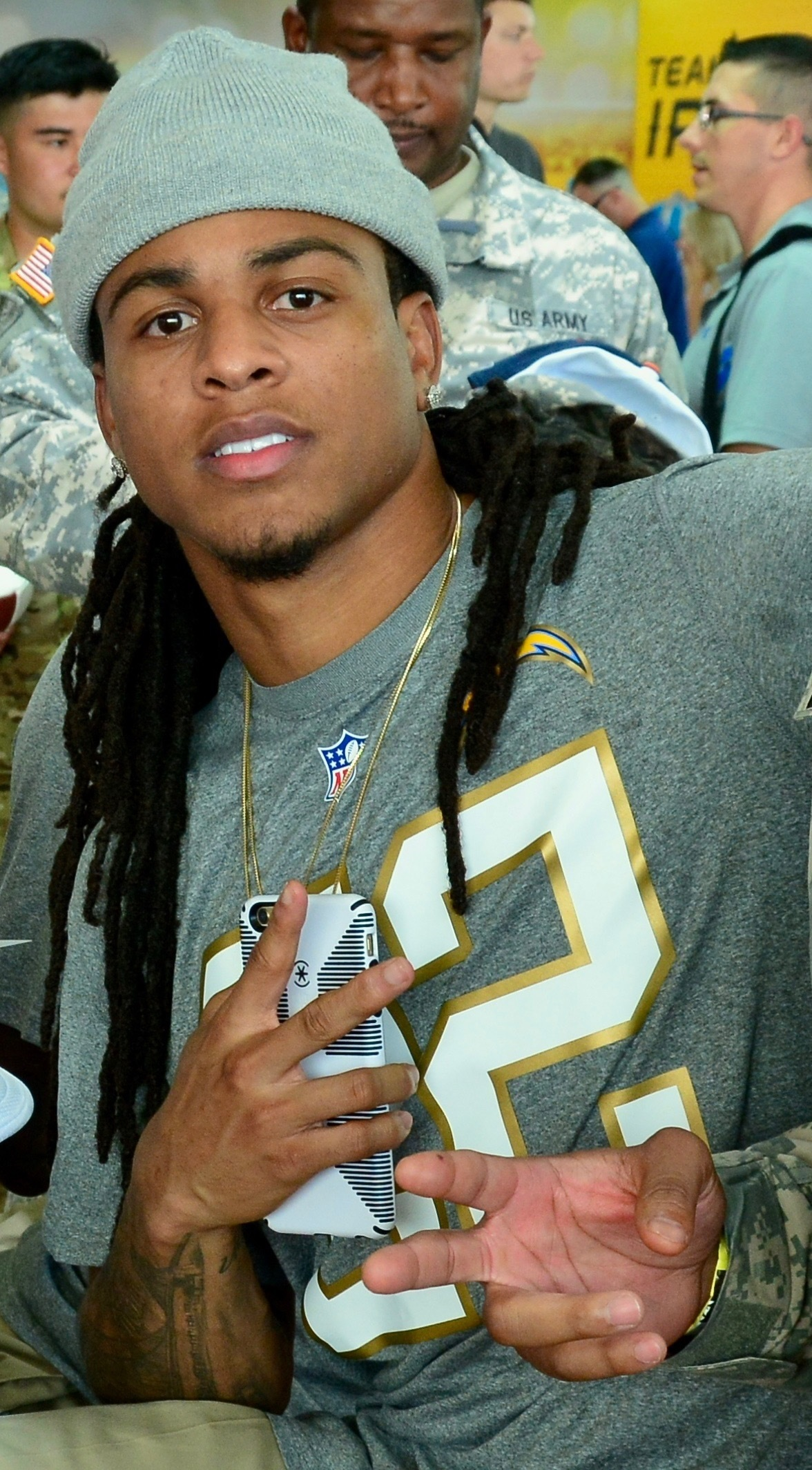
- Verrett at the 2016 Pro Bowl

No. 22, 27, 2
- Position: Cornerback

Personal information
- Born: June 18, 1991 (age 35); Fairfield, California, U.S.
- Listed height: 5 ft 10 in (1.78 m)
- Listed weight: 188 lb (85 kg)

Career information
- High school: Angelo Rodriguez (Fairfield)
- College: Santa Rosa (2009–2010); TCU (2011–2013)
- NFL draft: 2014: 1st round, 25th overall pick

Career history
- San Diego / Los Angeles Chargers (2014–2018); San Francisco 49ers (2019–2022); Houston Texans (2023)*; San Francisco 49ers (2023)
- * Offseason or practice squad member only

Awards and highlights
- Pro Bowl (2015); First-team All-American (2013); Co-Big 12 Defensive Player of the Year (2013); 2× First-team All-Big 12 (2012, 2013)

Career NFL statistics
- Total tackles: 145
- Fumble recoveries: 1
- Pass deflections: 26
- Interceptions: 7
- Defensive touchdowns: 1
- Stats at Pro Football Reference

Jason Verrett (born June 18, 1991) is an American former professional football cornerback. He was selected by the San Diego Chargers in the first round of the 2014 NFL draft. He played college football for the TCU Horned Frogs.

== Early life ==
Verrett attended B Gale Wilson Middle School and attended Angelo Rodriguez High School, where he played football and ran track. In football, he played running back on offense and cornerback on the defensive side. He received Back of the Year honors on offense his junior and senior years. In track & field, Verrett competed in the 100-meter dash event in 2007, clocking a PR of 11.87 seconds at the SCAC FINALS Meet, where he took 3rd in the freshman/sophomore finals. This was the only year he competed in track.

== College career ==
After graduating high school with no college scholarship offers, Verrett opted to attend Santa Rosa Junior College (SRJC). While at SRJC, Verrett was named to the all-conference first-team in 2010. He was considered a three-star recruit by Rivals.com.

In 2011, he went to TCU and had 58 tackles. The following year, he had 63 tackles and a team-leading six interceptions. He was a first-team All-Big 12 Conference selection. He was also named an All-American by Sports Illustrated.

== Professional career ==
=== Pre-draft ===
He attended the NFL Scouting Combine in Indianapolis and completed all of the combine and positional drills. Verrett finished second, among all participating defensive backs, in the 40-yard dash. On March 6, 2014, Verrett attended TCU’s pro day, but opted to stand on his combine numbers and only performed the bench press and vertical jump. He impressed scouts by performing 19 reps on the bench press with a torn labrum in his shoulder.

External videos
- Jason Verrett’s NFL Combine Workout
- Breaking Down TCU CB Jason Verrett

Verrett attended a private workout with the Carolina Panthers and also met with multiple teams for pre-draft visits. He had pre-draft visits with the Pittsburgh Steelers, Houston Texans, Arizona Cardinals, New York Jets, and St. Louis Rams. On March 17, 2014, Verrett underwent surgery to repair a torn labrum he sustained during the season. At the conclusion of the pre-draft process, Verrett was projected to be a mid to late first round pick by NFL draft experts and scouts. He was ranked as the third best cornerback prospect in the draft by Sports Illustrated and NFL analyst Bucky Brooks, was ranked the fourth best cornerback by DraftScout.com, and was ranked the fifth best cornerback by NFL analyst Mike Mayock.

Pre-draft measurables
Height	Weight	Arm length	Hand span	40-yard dash	10-yard split	20-yard split	20-yard shuttle	Three-cone drill	Vertical jump	Broad jump	Bench press	Wonderlic
5 ft 9 1/2 in (1.77 m)	189 lb (86 kg)	30 5/8 in (0.78 m)	9 1/4 in (0.23 m)	4.38 s	1.50 s	2.54 s	4.00 s	6.69 s	39.5 in (1.00 m)	10 ft 8 in (3.25 m)	19 reps	17
All values from NFL Combine/Pro Day

=== San Diego / Los Angeles Chargers ===
==== 2014 ====
The San Diego Chargers selected Verrett in the first round (25th overall) of the 2014 NFL draft. Verrett was the fourth cornerback drafted in 2014, behind Justin Gilbert (8th overall), Kyle Fuller (14th overall), and Darqueze Dennard (24th overall). Verrett became the highest selected TCU defender since Bob Lilly in 1961. On May 29, 2014, the Chargers signed Verrett to a four-year, $7.88 million contract that includes $6.39 million guaranteed and a signing bonus of $4.05 million.

External videos
- Chargers draft Jason Verrett 25th overall
- 2014 NFL Draft Profile: Jason Verrett

Throughout training camp, Verrett competed against Shareece Wright, Richard Marshall, and Brandon Flowers. Head coach Mike McCoy named Verrett the third cornerback on the depth chart to start the regular season, behind Flowers and Wright.

External videos
- Jason Verrett intercepts Derek Carr

Verrett made his professional regular season debut in the Chargers season opener at the Cardinals; he recorded four combined tackles and deflected a pass in their 18–17 loss. On September 14, 2014, Verrett earned his first career start in place of Flowers, who had suffered a groin injury. Verrett was inactive for the Chargers’ 33–14 win against the Jacksonville Jaguars in Week 4 due to a hamstring injury.

On October 12, 2014, Verrett recorded a season-high six solo tackles, broke up two passes, and made his first career interception during a 31–28 victory at the Oakland Raiders in Week 6. Verrett intercepted a pass by Raiders’ rookie quarterback Derek Carr with 1:13 remaining in the game to seal the Chargers victory. Verrett left the game in the third quarter after injuring his labrum in three places while diving for a pass, but returned to finish the game. Verrett was inactive for the Chargers’ Week 7 loss to the Kansas City Chiefs due to his torn labrum. In Week 8, Verrett attempted to play with his shoulder injury after cornerbacks Flowers and Steve Williams were listed as inactive due to injuries. Verrett made one tackle before exiting in the second quarter of the Chargers’ 35–21 loss at the Denver Broncos. On November 15, 2014, the Chargers officially placed Verrett on injured reserve for the rest of his rookie season. He required surgery to repair three tears to his labrum and a tear to his rotator cuff. Verrett finished his rookie season in 2014 with 19 combined tackles (18 solo), four pass deflections, and one interception in six games and four starts.

==== 2015 ====
Verrett entered training camp slated as a starting cornerback after Shareece Wright departed for the San Francisco 49ers during free agency. McCoy named Verrett and Flowers the starting cornerbacks to begin the regular season. They started alongside nickelback Patrick Robinson and safeties Eric Weddle and Jahleel Addae.

Verrett was inactive during a Week 4 victory against the Cleveland Browns due to a foot injury. On November 9, 2015, Verrett made a season-high three pass deflections and returned an interception by Bears’ quarterback Jay Cutler during a 22–19 loss to the Chicago Bears in Week 9. Verrett intercepted a pass that was originally intended for wide receiver Alshon Jeffery and returned it for a 68-yard touchdown during the second quarter. In a Week 14, Verrett collected a season-high eight solo tackles, deflected a pass, and intercepted a pass by Chiefs’ quarterback Alex Smith during a 10–3 loss to the Chiefs. His interception ended Alex Smith's streak of 312 consecutive pass attempts without an interception. He was inactive for the Chargers’ Week 17 loss at the Broncos. Verrett finished the season with 47 combined tackles (42 solo), 12 pass deflections, three interceptions, and one touchdown in 14 games and 13 starts. On January 14, 2016, it was announced that Verrett was selected to play in the 2016 Pro Bowl as a late replacement for Darrelle Revis.

==== 2016 ====
Verrett entered training camp slated as a starting cornerback. McCoy named Verrett and Flowers the starting cornerbacks to start the regular season. He started in the Chargers’ season-opener at the Chiefs and recorded two combined tackles, deflected a pass, and made an interception during their 33–27 loss. On October 2, 2016, Verrett collected a season-high six solo tackles and deflected a pass during a 35–34 loss against the New Orleans Saints in Week 4. On October 5, 2016, it was reported that Verrett underwent an MRI after complaining of soreness and was diagnosed with a partially torn ACL. It was later revealed Verrett played through the injury and was thought to have torn his ACL in Week 2 against the Jaguars On October 7, 2016, the Chargers officially placed Verrett on injured reserve for the remainder of the season. Verrett finished the 2016 NFL season with 13 combined tackles (11 solo), three pass deflections, and one interception in four games and four starts.

==== 2017 ====
On January 1, 2017, the Chargers fired McCoy after they finished the previous season with a 5–11 record. On April 24, 2017, the Chargers opted to exercise the fifth-year, $8.52 million option on Verrett's rookie contract. Verrett entered training camp slated as a starting cornerback under new defensive coordinator Gus Bradley. Head coach Anthony Lynn named Verrett and Casey Hayward the starting cornerbacks to begin the regular season. He started in the Chargers’ season-opener at the Broncos and made one solo tackle during their 24–21 loss. Following the game, Verrett began to develop knee soreness and was inactive for their Week 2 loss against the Miami Dolphins. On September 23, 2017, the Chargers placed Verrett on injured reserve after he injured his knee and elected to undergo knee surgery. He was limited to one tackle in one game and one start in 2017.

==== 2018 ====
On July 27, 2018, Verrett tore his Achilles tendon on the first day of training camp, ruling him out for the entire 2018 season. He was placed on injured reserve on August 2, 2018.

=== San Francisco 49ers (first stint) ===
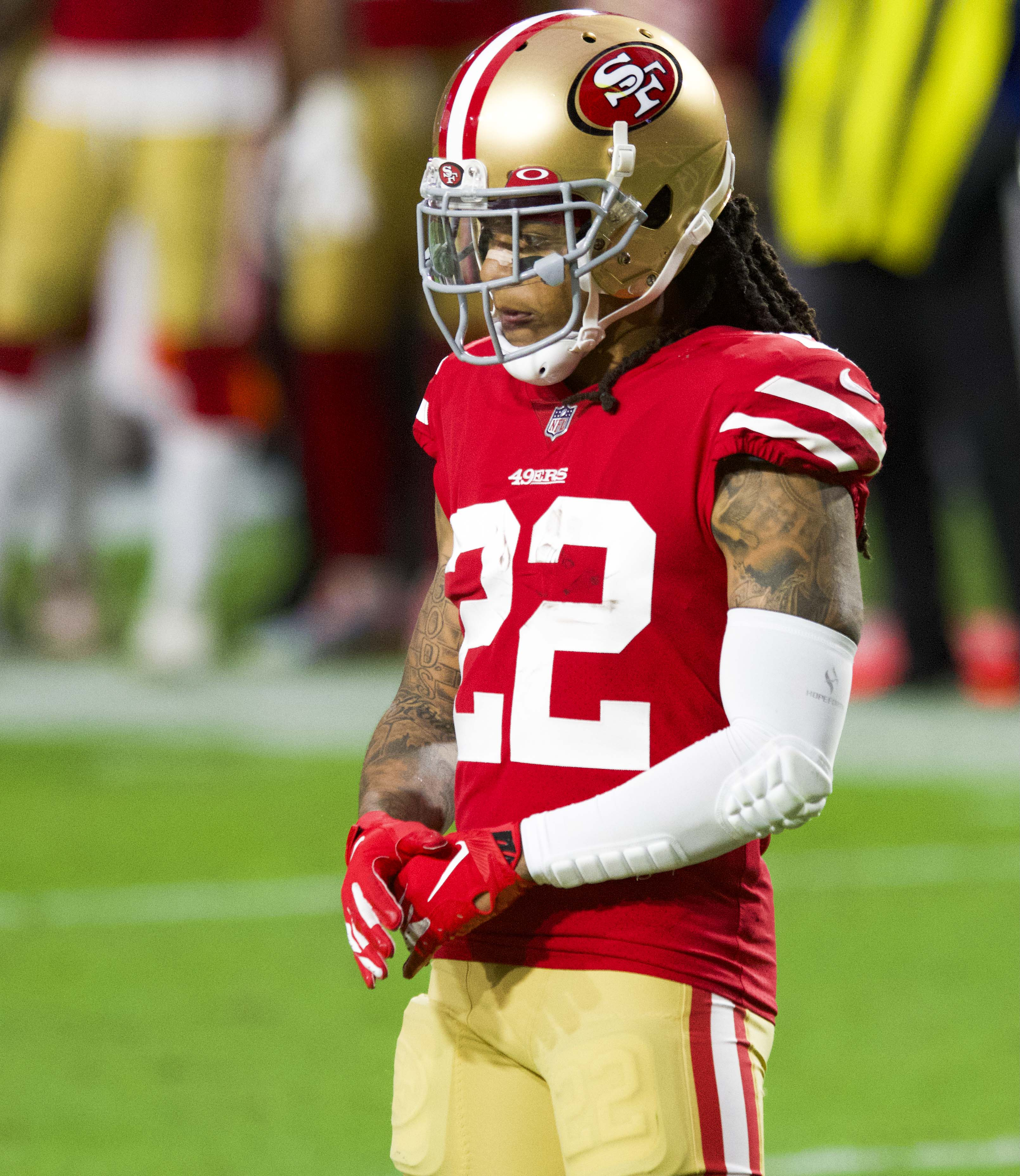
Verrett playing for the San Francisco 49ers in 2020

On March 14, 2019, Verrett signed a one-year, $3.6 million contract with the 49ers. He was placed on injured reserve on October 3, 2019, with an ankle injury. Without Verrett, the 49ers reached Super Bowl LIV, but lost 31–20 to the Kansas City Chiefs.

On April 13, 2020, Verrett re-signed with the 49ers. In Week 6 against the Los Angeles Rams on Sunday Night Football, Verrett intercepted a pass thrown by Jared Goff during the 24–16 win. This was Verrett's first interception since 2016 and his first as a 49er.

On April 1, 2021, Verrett re-signed with the 49ers. He tore his ACL in the season opening win against the Detroit Lions, ending his season.

On May 2, 2022, Verrett re-signed with the 49ers. He was placed on the reserve/PUP list to start the season on August 23, 2022. The 49ers activated him on October 26. On November 9, 2022, Verrett tore his Achilles tendon thus ending his season.

=== Houston Texans ===
On October 11, 2023, the Texans signed Verrett to their practice squad. He was released on November 15.

=== San Francisco 49ers (second stint) ===
On December 11, 2023, Verrett signed with the 49ers practice squad. On January 5, 2024, Verrett fell on the practice field and injured his rotator cuff, necessitating surgery and ending his season. His contract expired when the team's season ended on February 11.

== NFL career statistics ==
Year	Team	GP	Tackles				Fumbles			Interceptions					
Year	Team	GP	Cmb	Solo	Ast	Sck	FF	FR	Yds	Int	Yds	Avg	Lng	TD	PD
2014	SD	6	19	18	1	0.0	0	0	0	1	0	0.0	0	0	4
2015	SD	14	47	42	5	0.0	0	0	0	3	68	22.7	68	1	12
2016	SD	4	13	11	2	0.0	0	1	0	1	0	0.0	0	0	3
2017	LAC	1	1	1	0	0.0	0	0	0	0	0	0.0	0	0	0
2019	SF	1	0	0	0	0.0	0	0	0	0	0	0.0	0	0	0
2020	SF	13	60	50	10	0.0	0	0	0	2	0	0.0	0	0	7
2021	SF	1	5	3	2	0.0	0	0	0	0	0	0.0	0	0	0
2023	SF	1	0	0	0	0.0	0	0	0	0	0	0.0	0	0	0
Career		40	145	125	20	0.0	0	1	0	7	68	9.7	68	1	26
