= Chris McAllister (American football) =

American football player (born 1991)

No. 8, 31
- Position: Defensive end

Personal information
- Born: March 3, 1991 (age 35); Converse, Texas, U.S.
- Listed height: 6 ft 2 in (1.88 m)
- Listed weight: 245 lb (111 kg)

Career information
- High school: Judson (Converse)
- College: Baylor
- NFL draft: 2014: undrafted

Career history
- Houston Texans (2014)*; San Jose SaberCats (2015); Arizona Rattlers (2016–2023)
- * Offseason or practice squad member only

Awards and highlights
- ArenaBowl champion (2015); United Bowl champion (2017); First Team All-IFL (2017); First-team All-Big 12 (2013); Baylor University Career Sacks Leader (Tied)

Career AFL statistics
- Tackles: 2.5
- Sacks: 0.5
- Forced fumbles: 0
- Fumble recoveries: 0
- INTs: 0
- Stats at ArenaFan.com

Chris McAllister (born March 3, 1991) is an American former football defensive end. He played college football at Baylor.

== Early life ==
McAllister attended Judson High School in Converse, Texas; upon graduating in 2009, he played football at Baylor University. During his time at Baylor, McAllister recorded a total of 15.0 sacks; this left him tied for the record of most career sacks in Baylor history. He led the team in sacks in 2012 and 2013 (with 6.0 and 6.5, respectively).

== Professional career ==
Pre-draft measurables
Height	Weight	Arm length	Hand span	40-yard dash	10-yard split	20-yard split	20-yard shuttle	Three-cone drill	Vertical jump	Broad jump	Bench press
6 ft 1 3/4 in (1.87 m)	255 lb (116 kg)	32 3/8 in (0.82 m)	9 1/2 in (0.24 m)	4.77 s	1.65 s	2.74 s	4.54 s	7.43 s	32.5 in (0.83 m)	9 ft 6 in (2.90 m)	28 reps
All values from Pro Day

McAllister went undrafted in 2014. He eventually earned a tryout with the Houston Texans of the NFL, but failed to make the team. He was assigned to the San Jose SaberCats of the Arena Football League on July 30, 2015. He recorded statistics in exactly one game for the SaberCats; there, he assisted on a sack in the team's regular season finale against the Los Angeles Kiss. McAllister finished the season on the team's Injured Reserve list; despite this, he won his first AFL Championship when the SaberCats defeated the Jacksonville Sharks in ArenaBowl XXVIII.

On December 4, 2015, McAllister was assigned to the Arizona Rattlers. McAllister re-signed with Rattlers on November 21, 2016. McAllister was released on January 30, 2017, but was re-signed on February 9, 2017. McAllister was named First Team All-Indoor Football League in 2017. On July 8, the Rattlers defeated the Sioux Falls Storm in the United Bowl by a score of 50–41. He re-signed with the Rattlers on August 28, 2017.
