= 2013 TCU Horned Frogs football team =

American college football season

2013 TCU Horned Frogs football
- Conference: Big 12 Conference
- Record: 4–8 (2–7 Big 12)
- Head coach: Gary Patterson (13th season)
- Co-offensive coordinators: Jarrett Anderson (5th season); Rusty Burns (2nd season)
- Offensive scheme: Spread
- Defensive coordinator: Dick Bumpas (10th season)
- Base defense: 4–2–5
- Home stadium: Amon G. Carter Stadium

2013 Big 12 Conference football standings
	Conf.			Overall
Team	W		L	W		L
No. 13 Baylor $	8	–	1	11	–	2
No. 6 Oklahoma %	7	–	2	11	–	2
No. 17 Oklahoma State	7	–	2	10	–	3
Texas	7	–	2	8	–	5
Kansas State	5	–	4	8	–	5
Texas Tech	4	–	5	8	–	5
TCU	2	–	7	4	–	8
West Virginia	2	–	7	4	–	8
Iowa State	2	–	7	3	–	9
Kansas	1	–	8	3	–	9
$ – BCS representative as conference champion; % – BCS at-large representative; Rankings from AP Poll

The 2013 TCU Horned Frogs football team represented Texas Christian University (TCU) in the 2013 NCAA Division I FBS football season. Playing as a member of the Big 12 Conference (Big 12), the team was led by head coach Gary Patterson, in his 13th year, and played its home games at Amon G. Carter Stadium in Fort Worth, Texas.

== Coaching staff ==
Name	Position	Year at TCU	Alma mater
Gary Patterson	Head Coach	13th	Kansas State (1983)
Jarrett Anderson	Co-Offensive Coordinator/Running Backs	16th	New Mexico (1993)
Dick Bumpas	Defensive Coordinator/Defensive Line	10th	Arkansas (1973)
Rusty Burns	Co-Offensive Coordinator/Quarterbacks	5th	Springfield College (1978)
DeMontie Cross	Linebackers	1st	Missouri (1997)
Chad Glasgow	Safeties	12th	Oklahoma State (1995)
Clay Jennings	Cornerbacks	6th	North Texas (1996)
Curtis Luper	Wide Receivers	1st	Stephen F. Austin (1996)
Ryan McInerney	Graduate Assistant – Defense	3rd	Pittsburg State (2008)
Dan Sharp	Tight Ends/Special Teams	13th	TCU (1985)
Kyle Skierski	Graduate Assistant – Offense	2nd	UC Davis (2006)
Eddie Williamson	Assistant Head Coach/Offensive Line	13th	Davidson (1973)

== Schedule ==
Date	Time	Opponent	Rank	Site	TV	Result	Attendance
August 31	8:00 p.m.	vs. No. 12 LSU*	No. 20	AT&T Stadium; Arlington, TX (Cowboys Classic)	ESPN	L 27–37	80,230
September 7	11:00 a.m.	Southeastern Louisiana*	No. 24	Amon G. Carter Stadium; Fort Worth, TX	FSN	W 38–17	41,170
September 12	6:30 p.m.	at Texas Tech	No. 24	Jones AT&T Stadium; Lubbock, TX (The West Texas Championship)	ESPN	L 10–20	58,701
September 28	11:00 a.m.	SMU*		Amon G. Carter Stadium; Fort Worth, TX (Battle for the Iron Skillet)	FS1	W 48–17	45,111
October 5	6:00 p.m.	at No. 11 Oklahoma		Gaylord Family Oklahoma Memorial Stadium; Norman, OK	FOX	L 17–20	84,992
October 12	11:00 a.m.	Kansas		Amon G. Carter Stadium; Fort Worth, TX	FSN	W 27–17	41,894
October 19	11:00 a.m.	at Oklahoma State		Boone Pickens Stadium; Stillwater, OK	FOX	L 10–24	59,638
October 26	6:30 p.m.	Texas		Amon G. Carter Stadium; Fort Worth, TX (rivalry)	FS1	L 7–30	48,212
November 2	2:30 p.m.	West Virginia		Amon G. Carter Stadium; Fort Worth, TX	ESPNU	L 27–30 ^{OT}	41,632
November 9	11:00 a.m.	at Iowa State		Jack Trice Stadium; Ames, IA	FSN	W 21–17	54,922
November 16	2:30 p.m.	at Kansas State		Bill Snyder Family Football Stadium; Manhattan, KS	FSN	L 31–33	52,697
November 30	2:30 p.m.	No. 9 Baylor		Amon G. Carter Stadium; Fort Worth, TX (rivalry)	ESPN2	L 38–41	43,568
*Non-conference game; Rankings from AP Poll released prior to the game; All times are in Central time

- Schedule source:

== Game summaries ==
=== Vs. LSU ===
	1	2	3	4	Total
#12 Tigers	6	10	14	7	37
#20 Horned Frogs	3	7	7	10	27

=== Southeastern Louisiana ===
	1	2	3	4	Total
Lions	0	14	0	3	17
#24 Horned Frogs	7	10	14	7	38

=== @ Texas Tech ===
	1	2	3	4	Total
#24 Horned Frogs	0	0	3	7	10
Red Raiders	10	0	0	10	20

=== SMU ===
	1	2	3	4	Total
Mustangs	7	3	0	7	17
Horned Frogs	0	7	10	31	48

=== @ Oklahoma ===
	1	2	3	4	Total
Horned Frogs	0	0	10	7	17
#11 Sooners	3	10	0	7	20

=== Kansas ===
	1	2	3	4	Total
Jayhawks	3	7	7	0	17
Horned Frogs	7	3	14	3	27

This was TCU's first conference win at home since joining the Big 12 in 2012. The three conference games won in their inaugural Big 12 season were all on the road.

=== @ Oklahoma State ===
	1	2	3	4	Total
Horned Frogs	0	0	3	7	10
Cowboys	7	10	0	7	24

=== Texas ===
	1	2	3	4	Total
Longhorns	10	10	7	3	30
Horned Frogs	7	0	0	0	7

=== West Virginia ===
	1	2	3	4	OT	Total
Mountaineers	3	7	0	17	3	30
Horned Frogs	10	7	0	10	0	27

=== @ Iowa State ===
	1	2	3	4	Total
Horned Frogs	7	7	0	7	21
Cyclones	0	7	10	0	17

=== @ Kansas State ===
	1	2	3	4	Total
Horned Frogs	0	7	21	3	31
Wildcats	14	3	10	6	33

=== Baylor ===
	1	2	3	4	Total
#9 Bears	10	17	14	0	41
Horned Frogs	3	14	14	7	38

== Ranking ==
Ranking movements Legend: ██ Increase in ranking ██ Decrease in ranking — = Not ranked RV = Received votes
	Week																
Poll	Pre	1	2	3	4	5	6	7	8	9	10	11	12	13	14	15	Final
AP	20	24	24	RV	—	—	—	—	—	—	—	—	—	—	—	—	—
Coaches	20	24	24	—	—	—	—	—	—	—	—	—	—	—	—	—	—
Harris	Not released							—	—	—	—	—	—	—	—	—	Not released
BCS	Not released								—	—	—	—	—	—	—	—	Not released
