= 2013 Oklahoma State Cowboys football team =

American college football season

2013 Oklahoma State Cowboys football

Cotton Bowl Classic, L 31–41 vs. Missouri
- Conference: Big 12 Conference

Ranking
- Coaches: No. 17
- AP: No. 17
- Record: 10–3 (7–2 Big 12)
- Head coach: Mike Gundy (9th season)
- Offensive coordinator: Mike Yurcich (1st season)
- Offensive scheme: Air raid
- Defensive coordinator: Glenn Spencer (1st season)
- Base defense: 4–3
- Home stadium: Boone Pickens Stadium

2013 Big 12 Conference football standings
	Conf.			Overall
Team	W		L	W		L
No. 13 Baylor $	8	–	1	11	–	2
No. 6 Oklahoma %	7	–	2	11	–	2
No. 17 Oklahoma State	7	–	2	10	–	3
Texas	7	–	2	8	–	5
Kansas State	5	–	4	8	–	5
Texas Tech	4	–	5	8	–	5
TCU	2	–	7	4	–	8
West Virginia	2	–	7	4	–	8
Iowa State	2	–	7	3	–	9
Kansas	1	–	8	3	–	9
$ – BCS representative as conference champion; % – BCS at-large representative; Rankings from AP Poll

The 2013 Oklahoma State Cowboys football team represented Oklahoma State University in the 2013 NCAA Division I FBS football season. The Cowboys were led by ninth year head coach Mike Gundy and played their home games at Boone Pickens Stadium in Stillwater, Oklahoma. They were a charter member of the Big 12 Conference. They finished the season 10–3, 7–2 in Big 12 play to finish in a three way for second place. They were invited to the Cotton Bowl Classic where they lost to Missouri.

== Personnel ==
=== Coaching staff ===
Name	Position	Seasons at Oklahoma State	Alma mater
Mike Gundy	Head coach	8	Oklahoma State (1990)
Glenn Spencer	Defensive coordinator/linebackers	0	Georgia Tech (1987)
Mike Yurcich	Offensive coordinator/quarterbacks	0	California (PA) (1999)
Joe Bob Clements	Defensive line	0	Kansas State (1993)
Tim Duffie	Safeties	0	Texas Tech (1999)
Kasey Dunn	Co-Wide Receivers	2	Idaho (1992)
Van Malone	Cornerbacks	1	Texas (1993)
Jason Ray	Co-Wide Receivers	0	Missouri (2007)
Jemal Singleton	Running Backs	3	Air Force (1999)
Joe Wickline	Offensive Line	9	Florida (1983)

== Schedule ==
Date	Time	Opponent	Rank	Site	TV	Result	Attendance
August 31	2:30 p.m.	vs. Mississippi State*	No. 13	Reliant Stadium; Houston, TX (Texas Kickoff)	ABC, ESPN2	W 21–3	35,874
September 7	11:00 a.m.	at UTSA*	No. 13	Alamodome; San Antonio, TX	FS1	W 56–35	40,977
September 14	6:30 p.m.	Lamar*	No. 12	Boone Pickens Stadium; Stillwater, OK	FSSW	W 59–3	59,061
September 28	11:00 a.m.	at West Virginia	No. 11	Milan Puskar Stadium; Morgantown, WV	ESPN	L 21–30	57,280
October 5	2:30 p.m.	Kansas State	No. 21	Boone Pickens Stadium; Stillwater, OK	ABC	W 33–29	58,841
October 19	11:00 a.m.	TCU	No. 21	Boone Pickens Stadium; Stillwater, OK	FOX	W 24–10	59,638
October 26	11:00 a.m.	at Iowa State	No. 19	Jack Trice Stadium; Ames, IA	FSN	W 58–27	56,800
November 2	6:00 p.m.	at No. 15 Texas Tech	No. 18	Jones AT&T Stadium; Lubbock, TX	FOX	W 52–34	61,836
November 9	3:00 p.m.	Kansas	No. 15	Boone Pickens Stadium; Stillwater, OK	FS1	W 42–6	58,476
November 16	2:30 p.m.	at No. 24 Texas	No. 12	Darrell K Royal–Texas Memorial Stadium; Austin, TX	FOX	W 38–13	99,739
November 23	7:00 p.m.	No. 3 Baylor	No. 11	Boone Pickens Stadium; Stillwater, OK (College GameDay)	ABC	W 49–17	60,218
December 7	11:00 a.m.	No. 18 Oklahoma	No. 6	Boone Pickens Stadium; Stillwater, OK (Bedlam Series)	ABC	L 24–33	58,520
January 3, 2014	6:30 p.m.	vs. No. 9 Missouri*	No. 13	AT&T Stadium; Arlington, TX (Cotton Bowl Classic)	FOX	L 31–41	72,690
*Non-conference game; Rankings from AP Poll released prior to the game; All times are in Central time

== Game summaries ==
=== Vs. Mississippi State ===
	1	2	3	4	Total
Bulldogs	3	0	0	0	3
#13 Cowboys	0	7	7	7	21

=== UTSA ===
	1	2	3	4	Total
#13 Cowboys	14	21	7	14	56
Roadrunners	7	0	0	28	35

=== Lamar ===
	1	2	3	4	Total
Cardinals	0	3	0	0	3
#12 Cowboys	21	10	21	7	59

=== West Virginia ===
	1	2	3	4	Total
#11 Cowboys	7	7	7	0	21
Mountaineers	14	10	0	6	30

=== Kansas State ===
	1	2	3	4	Total
Wildcats	7	7	7	8	29
#21 Cowboys	7	10	6	10	33

=== TCU ===
	1	2	3	4	Total
Horned Frogs	0	0	3	7	10
#21 Cowboys	7	10	0	7	24

=== Iowa State ===
	1	2	3	4	Total
#19 Cowboys	21	7	17	13	58
Cyclones	7	13	0	7	27

=== Texas Tech ===
	1	2	3	4	Total
#18 Cowboys	21	7	21	3	52
#15 Red Raiders	3	21	7	3	34

=== Kansas ===
	1	2	3	4	Total
Jayhawks	0	0	3	3	6
#15 Cowboys	14	14	0	14	42

=== Texas ===
	1	2	3	4	Total
#12 Cowboys	7	21	10	0	38
#24 Longhorns	3	7	3	0	13

=== Baylor ===
	1	2	3	4	Total
#3 Bears	0	3	0	14	17
#11 Cowboys	7	7	21	14	49

=== Oklahoma ===
	1	2	3	4	Total
#18 Sooners	7	3	7	16	33
#6 Cowboys	7	3	7	7	24

=== Missouri ===
	1	2	3	4	Total
#13 Cowboys	7	0	7	17	31
#9 Tigers	7	10	0	24	41

== Rankings ==
Ranking movements Legend: ██ Increase in ranking ██ Decrease in ranking
	Week																
Poll	Pre	1	2	3	4	5	6	7	8	9	10	11	12	13	14	15	Final
AP	13	13	12	11	11	21	22	21	19	18	15	12	11	7	6	13	17
Coaches	14	14	11	11	11	20	20	17	13	12	11	10	9	7	6	13	17
Harris	Not released							19	17	15	14	11	9	7	6	13	Not released
BCS	Not released								19	18	14	12	10	7	6	13	Not released
