= 2013 West Virginia Mountaineers football team =

American college football season

2013 West Virginia Mountaineers football
- Conference: Big 12 Conference
- Record: 4–8 (2–7 Big 12)
- Head coach: Dana Holgorsen (3rd season)
- Offensive coordinator: Shannon Dawson (2nd season)
- Offensive scheme: Spread
- Defensive coordinator: Keith Patterson (2nd season)
- Base defense: 3–3–5
- Home stadium: Mountaineer Field at Milan Puskar Stadium

2013 Big 12 Conference football standings
	Conf.			Overall
Team	W		L	W		L
No. 13 Baylor $	8	–	1	11	–	2
No. 6 Oklahoma %	7	–	2	11	–	2
No. 17 Oklahoma State	7	–	2	10	–	3
Texas	7	–	2	8	–	5
Kansas State	5	–	4	8	–	5
Texas Tech	4	–	5	8	–	5
TCU	2	–	7	4	–	8
West Virginia	2	–	7	4	–	8
Iowa State	2	–	7	3	–	9
Kansas	1	–	8	3	–	9
$ – BCS representative as conference champion; % – BCS at-large representative; Rankings from AP Poll

The 2013 West Virginia Mountaineers football team represented West Virginia University in the 2013 NCAA Division I FBS football season. Playing as a member of the Big 12 Conference (Big 12), the team was led by head coach Dana Holgorsen, in his third year. West Virginia played its home games on Mountaineer Field at Milan Puskar Stadium in Morgantown, West Virginia. The team finished the season at 4–8 (2–7 in Big 12 play), and as a result, they failed to qualify for a bowl game for the first time since going 3–8 in 2001.

== Schedule ==
Date	Time	Opponent	Site	TV	Result	Attendance	Source
August 31	12:00 p.m.	William & Mary*	Milan Puskar Stadium; Morgantown, WV	FS1	W 24–17	56,350	
September 7	7:00 p.m.	at No. 16 Oklahoma	Gaylord Family Oklahoma Memorial Stadium; Norman, OK	FOX	L 7–16	84,692	
September 14	12:00 p.m.	Georgia State*	Milan Puskar Stadium; Morgantown, WV	ROOT	W 41–7	57,440	
September 21	3:30 p.m.	vs. Maryland*	M&T Bank Stadium; Baltimore, MD (rivalry)	ESPNU	L 0–37	55,677	
September 28	12:00 p.m.	No. 11 Oklahoma State	Milan Puskar Stadium; Morgantown, WV (Gold Rush)	ESPN	W 30–21	57,280	
October 5	8:00 p.m.	at No. 16 Baylor	Floyd Casey Stadium; Waco, TX	FS1	L 42–73	45,467	
October 19	12:00 p.m.	No. 15 Texas Tech	Milan Puskar Stadium; Morgantown, WV	FS1	L 27–37	54,084	
October 26	3:45 p.m.	at Kansas State	Bill Snyder Family Football Stadium; Manhattan, KS	FS1	L 12–35	52,898	
November 2	3:30 p.m.	at TCU	Amon G. Carter Stadium; Fort Worth, TX	ESPNU	W 30–27 ^{OT}	41,632	
November 9	7:00 p.m.	Texas	Milan Puskar Stadium; Morgantown, WV (Stripe the Stadium)	FOX	L 40–47 ^{OT}	59,570	
November 16	12:00 p.m.	at Kansas	Memorial Stadium; Lawrence, KS	FSN	L 19–31	30,809	
November 30	4:00 p.m.	Iowa State	Milan Puskar Stadium; Morgantown, WV	FS1	L 44–52 ^{3OT}	33,735	
*Non-conference game; Rankings from AP Poll released prior to the game; All times are in Eastern time

== Game summaries ==
=== William & Mary ===
	1	2	3	4	Total
Tribe	7	10	0	0	17
Mountaineers	7	0	10	7	24

=== #16 Oklahoma ===
	1	2	3	4	Total
Mountaineers	7	0	0	0	7
#16 Sooners	3	10	0	3	16

=== Georgia State ===
	1	2	3	4	Total
Panthers	0	0	7	0	7
Mountaineers	10	7	3	21	41

=== Maryland ===
	1	2	3	4	Total
Mountaineers	0	0	0	0	0
Terrapins	14	16	0	7	37

=== #11 Oklahoma State ===
	1	2	3	4	Total
#11 Cowboys	7	7	7	0	21
Mountaineers	14	10	0	6	30

=== #17 Baylor ===
	1	2	3	4	Total
Mountaineers	7	7	7	21	42
#17 Bears	28	28	10	7	73

=== #16 Texas Tech ===
	1	2	3	4	Total
#16 Red Raiders	10	3	10	14	37
Mountaineers	0	13	14	0	27

=== Kansas State ===
	1	2	3	4	Total
Mountaineers	0	9	3	0	12
Wildcats	7	0	7	21	35

=== TCU ===
	1	2	3	4	OT	Total
Mountaineers	3	7	0	17	3	30
Horned Frogs	10	7	0	10	0	27

=== Texas ===
	1	2	3	4	OT	Total
Longhorns	3	10	17	10	7	47
Mountaineers	9	10	7	14	0	40

=== Kansas ===
	1	2	3	4	Total
Mountaineers	7	0	0	12	19
Jayhawks	3	14	7	7	31

=== Iowa State ===
	1	2	3	4	OT	2OT	3OT	Total
Cyclones	7	7	0	24	3	3	8	52
Mountaineers	17	14	0	7	3	3	0	44

== Coaching staff ==
2013 Coaching Staff
Head coach: Dana Holgorsen; Offensive coaches: Ron crook – Offensive line; Shannon Dawson – Offensive coordinator/quarterbacks coach; Lonnie galloway – Receivers; Ja'Juan Seider – Running backs; Defensive coaches: Keith Patterson – Defensive coordinator/linebackers; Tony Gibson – Safeties; Brian mitchell – Cornerbacks; Erik slaughter – Defensive line	Special teams coaches: Joe DeForest – Special teams coordinator; Support staff: Ryan dorchester – Recruiting coordinator; Alex hammond – Director of football operations; Mike joseph – Strength and conditioning coach; Dave kerns – Head athletic trainer; Dan nehlen – Equipment Manager; Quincy Wilson – Assistant director of football operations
