= Jeremiah George =

American football player (born 1992)

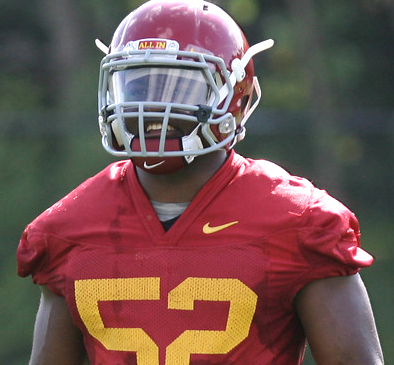
- George with the Iowa State Cyclones in 2013

No. 52, 54, 59
- Position: Linebacker

Personal information
- Born: January 24, 1992 (age 34); Clearwater, Florida, U.S.
- Listed height: 5 ft 11 in (1.80 m)
- Listed weight: 234 lb (106 kg)

Career information
- High school: Clearwater
- College: Iowa State
- NFL draft: 2014: 5th round, 154th overall pick

Career history
- New York Jets (2014)*; Jacksonville Jaguars (2014); Tampa Bay Buccaneers (2015); Dallas Cowboys (2016–2017)*; Indianapolis Colts (2017–2018)
- * Offseason or practice squad member only

Awards and highlights
- First-team All-Big 12 (2013)

Career NFL statistics
- Games played: 37
- Total tackles: 36
- Sacks: 0.5
- Fumble recoveries: 1
- Stats at Pro Football Reference

Jeremiah George (born January 24, 1992) is an American former professional football player who was a linebacker in the National Football League (NFL). He was selected by the New York Jets in the fifth round of the 2014 NFL draft. He played college football for the Iowa State Cyclones.

George was also a member of the Jacksonville Jaguars, Tampa Bay Buccaneers, Dallas Cowboys, and Indianapolis Colts.

== Early life ==
A native of Clearwater, Florida, George attended Clearwater High School. He recorded over 150 tackles as a senior, was the team’s leading rusher with 512 yards and five touchdowns, and was named the 2009 St. Petersburg Times Pinellas County Defensive Player of the Year. As a junior, he recorded 94 tackles, 12 for loss, four sacks and an interception for the Tornadoes.

Considered a three-star recruit by Rivals.com, he was rated the 57th best outside linebacker prospect of his class.

== College career ==
George attended Iowa State University where he played for the Iowa State Cyclones football team from 2010 to 2013. As a true freshman in 2010, he played in nine games finishing with four tackles. In 2011, he played in all 13 games, appearing mostly on special teams, he recorded one tackle. In 2012, starting nine games, he finished third on the team with 87 tackles, including four tackles for loss and three pass break-ups. As a senior in 2013, George led the Big 12 Conference in tackles with 133, becoming one of only three Cyclones to do so. He also led the team in tackles for loss (12.0), forced fumbles (3), sacks (3.5) and interceptions (2), and was named a first-team All-Big 12 selection.

== Professional career ==
Pre-draft measurables
Height	Weight	Arm length	Hand span	40-yard dash	10-yard split	20-yard split	20-yard shuttle	Three-cone drill	Vertical jump	Broad jump	Bench press
5 ft 11 in (1.80 m)	234 lb (106 kg)	31 7/8	9 1/4	4.66 s	1.61 s	2.66 s	4.69 s	7.46 s	38.5 in (0.98 m)	10 ft 9 in (3.28 m)	30 reps
All values from NFL Combine, and Pro Day

=== New York Jets ===
George was selected by the New York Jets in the fifth round (154th overall) of the 2014 NFL draft. He signed a four-year contract on May 15, 2014. He was released on September 1, 2014 and signed to the team's practice squad a day later.

=== Jacksonville Jaguars ===
The Jacksonville Jaguars signed George off the Jets' practice squad on September 23, 2014.

He was released on September 5, 2015.

=== Tampa Bay Buccaneers ===
On September 6, 2015, George was claimed off waivers by the Tampa Bay Buccaneers. On August 28, 2016, George was waived by the Buccaneers.

=== Dallas Cowboys ===
On September 6, 2016, George was signed to the Dallas Cowboys' practice squad. He signed a reserve/future contract with the Cowboys on January 16, 2017. On May 16, 2017, George was waived by the Cowboys.

=== Indianapolis Colts ===
On June 15, 2017, George was signed by the Indianapolis Colts.

On September 10, 2017, George made his Colts debut in the season opener against the Los Angeles Rams. In the game, he recovered a fumble off of a muffed catch by Tavon Austin to set the Colts up on the Rams' side of the field.

On September 1, 2018, George was placed on injured reserve. He was released on September 10, 2018.
