= Will Clarke (American football) =

American football player (born 1991)

No. 93, 94, 95, 45
- Position: Defensive end

Personal information
- Born: May 4, 1991 (age 35); Pittsburgh, Pennsylvania, U.S.
- Listed height: 6 ft 6 in (1.98 m)
- Listed weight: 271 lb (123 kg)

Career information
- High school: Allderdice (Pittsburgh)
- College: West Virginia
- NFL draft: 2014: 3rd round, 88th overall pick

Career history
- Cincinnati Bengals (2014–2016); Tampa Bay Buccaneers (2017–2018); St. Louis BattleHawks (2020); Detroit Lions (2020)*; New Orleans Saints (2020)*; Arlington Renegades (2023–2025)
- * Offseason or practice squad member only

Awards and highlights
- XFL champion (2023); Second-team All-Big 12 (2013)

Career NFL statistics
- Total tackles: 37
- Sacks: 7.0
- Fumble recoveries: 2
- Stats at Pro Football Reference

William Clarke Jr. (born May 4, 1991) is an American former professional football player who was a defensive end in the National Football League (NFL). He was selected by the Cincinnati Bengals in the third round of the 2014 NFL draft. He played college football for the West Virginia Mountaineers.

== Early life ==
Clarke attended Taylor Allderdice High School in Pittsburgh, Pennsylvania, where he was a two-time Tribune Review All-City League as tight end and linebacker.

He was considered a two-star recruit by Rivals.com.

== College career ==
Clarke attended West Virginia University from 2009 to 2013. In 2009, he redshirted as a true freshman. In 2010, he played in only four games. In 2011, he played in all 13 games, starting 11, recording 34 tackles, including five for loss and two sacks. In 2012, he started 12 games, recording 26 tackles, including 6.5 for loss and 1.5 sacks. In 2013, he set career highs in tackles (49), tackles for loss (17), and sacks (6), while earning second-team All-Big 12 Conference honors.

== Professional career ==
Pre-draft measurables
Height	Weight	Arm length	Hand span	40-yard dash	10-yard split	20-yard split	20-yard shuttle	Three-cone drill	Vertical jump	Broad jump	Bench press
6 ft 6 1/8 in (1.98 m)	271 lb (123 kg)	34 5/8 in (0.88 m)	9 7/8 in (0.25 m)	4.77 s	1.69 s	2.81 s	4.57 s	7.26 s	32.0 in (0.81 m)	9 ft 11 in (3.02 m)	22 reps

=== Cincinnati Bengals ===
He was selected by the Cincinnati Bengals in the third round (88th overall) of the 2014 NFL draft.

On September 2, 2017, Clarke was released by the Bengals.

=== Tampa Bay Buccaneers ===
On September 5, 2017, Clarke signed with the Tampa Bay Buccaneers.

On March 15, 2018, Clarke re-signed with the Buccaneers. He was released by the team on September 3, 2018. He was re-signed on September 12, 2018. On October 10, 2018, Clarke was released by the Buccaneers.

=== St. Louis BattleHawks ===
Clarke signed with the St. Louis BattleHawks of the XFL in December 2019. He had his contract terminated when the league suspended operations on April 10, 2020.

=== Detroit Lions ===
Clarke had a tryout with the Detroit Lions on August 19, 2020, and signed with the team four days later. He was released on September 5, 2020.

=== New Orleans Saints ===
On October 22, 2020, Clarke was signed to the practice squad of the New Orleans Saints. He was released on November 17, 2020.

=== Arlington Renegades ===
On November 17, 2022, Clarke was drafted by the Arlington Renegades of the XFL. He re-signed with the team on January 24, 2024.
