= Ben Heeney =

American football player (born 1992)

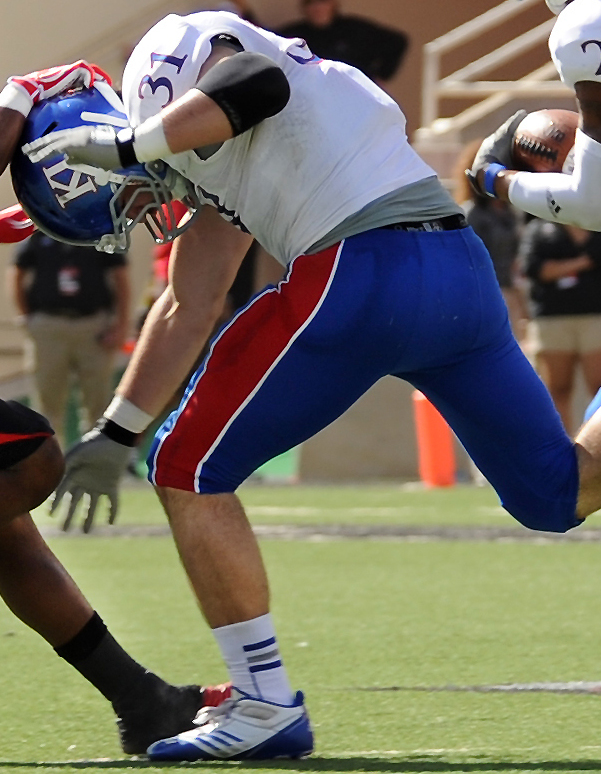
- Heeney with Kansas in 2012

No. 50, 51, 56
- Position: Linebacker

Personal information
- Born: May 13, 1992 (age 34); Overland Park, Kansas, U.S.
- Listed height: 6 ft 0 in (1.83 m)
- Listed weight: 230 lb (104 kg)

Career information
- High school: Hutchinson (Hutchinson, Kansas)
- College: Kansas
- NFL draft: 2015: 5th round, 140th overall pick

Career history
- Oakland Raiders (2015–2016); New Orleans Saints (2017); Houston Texans (2017); New York Guardians (2020)

Awards and highlights
- First-team All-Big 12 (2014); 2× Second-team All-Big 12 (2012, 2013)

Career NFL statistics
- Total tackles: 55
- Sacks: 2.5
- Forced fumbles: 1
- Stats at Pro Football Reference

Ben Heeney (born May 13, 1992) is an American former professional football player who was a linebacker in the National Football League (NFL). He played college football for the Kansas Jayhawks.

== Early life ==
Heeney attended Hutchinson High School in Hutchinson, Kansas. Helping to lead the Salthawks to three state titles. He played safety and running back. As a senior, he ran for a school record 2,083 yards and 39 touchdowns. He also had 143 tackles and four interceptions. Heeney committed to the University of Kansas to play college football.

== College career ==
Heeney played at Kansas from 2011 to 2014. As a true freshman, he played in all 12 games and had eight tackles. As a sophomore in 2012, Heeney started all 12 games, recording 112 tackles and a sack. As a junior in 2013, he played and started in 10 games, missing two due to injury. He finished the season with 88 tackles, two sacks and three interceptions. As a senior in 2014, Heeney again started all 12 games, finishing with 127 tackles, 1.5 sacks and one interception.

== Professional career ==
=== Oakland Raiders ===
Heeney was selected by the Oakland Raiders in the fifth round of the 2015 NFL draft with the 140th overall pick. He was placed on injured reserve on October 4, 2016. On July 25, 2017, the Raiders placed Heeney on the non-football injury list. He was waived on September 2, 2017.

=== New Orleans Saints ===
On September 22, 2017, Heeney was signed to the practice squad of the New Orleans Saints. He was promoted to the active roster on September 27, 2017. He was waived on October 3, 2017.

=== Houston Texans ===
On October 4, 2017, the Houston Texans claimed Heeney off waivers. The team placed him on injured reserve on November 29, 2017.

On March 26, 2018, Heeney re-signed with the Texans. On August 29, 2018, he was waived with an injury designation by the Texans after having ankle surgery. After going unclaimed on waivers, was placed on the Texans injured reserve. He was released on September 8, 2018.

=== New York Guardians ===
Heeney was selected by the New York Guardians of the XFL in round one of phase three of the 2020 XFL draft. He had his contract terminated when the league suspended operations on April 10, 2020.

=== Career statistics ===
| Year | Team | GP | Tackles | | | | | | | Interceptions | | | | |
| Year | Team | GP | Comb | Total | Ast | Sck | FF | SFTY | PDef | Int | TDs | Yds | Avg | Lng |
|---|---|---|---|---|---|---|---|---|---|---|---|---|---|---|
| 2015 | OAK | 15 | 38 | 31 | 7 | 2.5 | 1 | 0 | 1 | 0 | 0 | 0 | -- | 0 |
| 2016 | OAK | 4 | 15 | 13 | 2 | 0.0 | 0 | 0 | 0 | 0 | 0 | 0 | -- | 0 |
| 2017 | NO | 0 | 0 | 0 | 0 | 0.0 | 0 | 0 | 0 | 0 | 0 | 0 | -- | 0 |
| 2017 | HOU | 5 | 2 | 0 | 2 | 0.0 | 0 | 0 | 0 | 0 | 0 | 0 | -- | 0 |
| Career | | 24 | 55 | 44 | 11 | 2.5 | 1 | 0 | 1 | 0 | 0 | 0 | -- | 0 |

Career statistics accurate as of the end of the 2017 regular season.

== Personal life ==
Heeney is married to Taylor Alderson, and they have a son and a daughter.
