= Justin Gilbert =

American football player (born 1991)

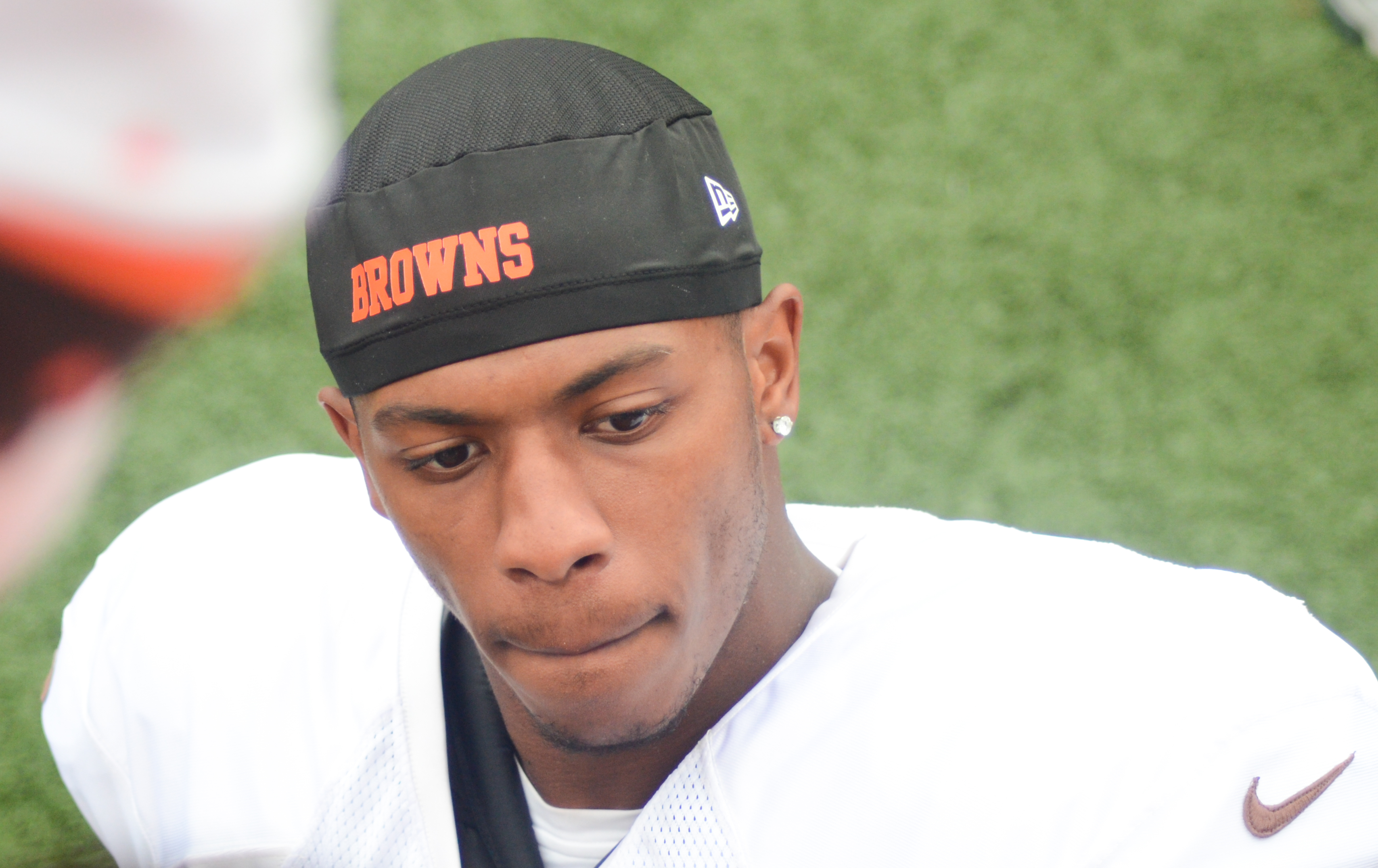
- Gilbert with the Cleveland Browns in 2014

No. 0 – Sioux City Bandits
- Position: Cornerback
- Roster status: Active

Personal information
- Born: November 7, 1991 (age 35); Huntsville, Texas, U.S.
- Listed height: 6 ft 0 in (1.83 m)
- Listed weight: 202 lb (92 kg)

Career information
- High school: Huntsville
- College: Oklahoma State (2010–2013)
- NFL draft: 2014: 1st round, 8th overall pick

Career history
- Cleveland Browns (2014–2015); Pittsburgh Steelers (2016); Sioux City Bandits (2023–present)

Awards and highlights
- Consensus All-American (2013); First-team All-Big 12 (2013); 2× Second-team All-Big 12 (2011, 2012)

Career NFL statistics
- Total tackles: 42
- Pass deflections: 9
- Interceptions: 1
- Defensive touchdowns: 1
- Stats at Pro Football Reference

Justin Rodrell Gilbert (born November 7, 1991) is an American professional football cornerback for the Sioux City Bandits of the National Arena League (NAL). He was selected by the Cleveland Browns with the eighth pick in the 2014 NFL draft, after playing college football at Oklahoma State. He has also been a member of the Pittsburgh Steelers.

== Early life ==
Gilbert attended Huntsville High School in Huntsville, Texas, where he was a three-sport star in football, basketball and track. He played as a defensive back and quarterback for the Huntsville Hornets football team, and was a two-time district MVP. He was a SuperPrep All-region selection and was ranked by that publication as the No. 51 player in Texas. As a junior, he accumulated 785 passing yards and 628 rushing yards. In his senior year, he rushed for over 1,000 yards with nine touchdowns and passed for over 800 yards.

Also a standout track & field athlete, Gilbert was one of the state's top sprinters. He captured two regional titles at the 2010 State 3-4A Regional, winning the 100-meter dash, with a time of 10.47 second, and the 200-meter dash, with a time of 21.29 seconds, while also placing second in the long jump (6.78 meters) and anchoring the 4x100 squad to a second-place finish.

Considered a four-star recruit by Rivals.com, Gilbert was listed as the No. 37 athlete in the state of Texas in 2010.

== College career ==
Gilbert attended Oklahoma State University between 2010 and 2013. As a true freshman in 2010, Gilbert was a backup cornerback and kick returner. For the season he had 18 tackles and returned two kickoff returns for touchdowns. He was named a freshman All-American by Rivals.com. As a sophomore in 2011, he had 48 tackles, five interceptions and two kickoff return touchdowns. He was the defensive MVP of the 2012 Fiesta Bowl. As a junior in 2012, he had 53 tackles and one kickoff return for a touchdown. He nearly entered the 2013 NFL draft but decided against it. As a senior in 2013, he set the Big 12 Conference record for kickoff return touchdowns with six. He was also a finalist for the Jim Thorpe Award. Gilbert won the 2013 College Football Performance Award as the nation's top defensive back.

== Professional career ==
Pre-draft measurables
Height	Weight	Arm length	Hand span	40-yard dash	10-yard split	20-yard split	20-yard shuttle	Three-cone drill	Vertical jump	Broad jump	Bench press
6 ft 0 1/8 in (1.83 m)	202 lb (92 kg)	33 1/8 in (0.84 m)	8 5/8 in (0.22 m)	4.35 s	1.54 s	2.50 s	4.39 s	6.92 s	35.5 in (0.90 m)	10 ft 6 in (3.20 m)	20 reps
All values from NFL Combine

=== Cleveland Browns ===
Gilbert was considered one of the top cornerback prospects for the 2014 NFL draft. Gilbert was selected with the eighth pick in the first round by the Cleveland Browns. After a slow start to his rookie season, when he had missed two games with an illness and a heel injury, Gilbert played in Week 14 against the Indianapolis Colts when teammate K'Waun Williams was injured. He ended the game with four tackles and one interception, which he returned for a touchdown. The Colts won 25–24.

=== Pittsburgh Steelers ===
On September 3, 2016, Gilbert was traded to the Pittsburgh Steelers for a 2018 sixth-round draft pick.

After not seeing the field in Week 1 against the Washington Redskins, Gilbert made his Steelers debut against the Cincinnati Bengals on September 18, playing exclusively on special teams. After another week of special teams duty against the Philadelphia Eagles, Gilbert made his debut on defense against the Kansas City Chiefs on October 2, covering Travis Kelce. Through the first 10 weeks, he played only 11 defensive snaps and was mainly used on kickoff coverage, but he returned three kickoffs for 69 yards.

During the 2016 season, Gilbert played in 12 games, recording one solo tackle and assisting on two others. He also made his NFL postseason debut, playing against the Chiefs and New England Patriots, returning three kickoffs for 43 yards.

On February 6, 2017, Gilbert was released by the Steelers.

On June 20, 2017, Gilbert was suspended by NFL commissioner Roger Goodell for one year for violating the league's substance-abuse policy.

=== Sioux City Bandits ===
On January 13, 2023, Gilbert signed with the Sioux City Bandits of Champions Indoor Football (CIF). On December 18, 2023, he re-signed with the Bandits for their first season in the National Arena League (NAL).
