= 2013 Buffalo Wild Wings Bowl =

- 25th Buffalo Wild Wings Bowl
Michigan Wolverines	Kansas State Wildcats
(7–5)	(7–5)
Big Ten	Big 12
14	31
Head coach: Brady Hoke	Head coach: Bill Snyder
	1	2	3	4	Total
Michigan	3	3	0	8	14
Kansas State	14	7	0	10	31
- Date: December 28, 2013
- Season: 2013
- Stadium: Sun Devil Stadium
- Location: Tempe, Arizona
- MVP: Jake Waters (QB), Tyler Lockett (WR), Dante Barnett (S), KSU
- Favorite: Kansas State by 3
- Referee: Land Clark (Pac-12)
- Attendance: 53,284

United States TV coverage
- Network: ESPN
- Announcers: Sean McDonough (Play-by-Play); Chris Spielman (Analyst)

The 2013 Buffalo Wild Wings Bowl was an American college football bowl game that was played on December 28, 2013, at Sun Devil Stadium in Tempe, Arizona. The 25th annual Buffalo Wild Wings Bowl featured the Michigan Wolverines of the Big Ten Conference and the Kansas State Wildcats of the Big 12 Conference. The game was telecast at 8:15 p.m. MST on ESPN. It is one of the 2013–14 bowl games that concluded the 2013 FBS football season. The game was sponsored by the Buffalo Wild Wings restaurant franchise.

Kansas State defeated Michigan by a score of 31–14, breaking the Wildcats' five-game bowl losing streak.

== Teams ==
This postseason game was the first meeting of the two teams.

=== Michigan ===
The Michigan Wolverines represented the University of Michigan during the 2013 NCAA Division I FBS football season. The Wolverines played in the Legends Division of the Big Ten Conference and played their home games at Michigan Stadium in Ann Arbor, Michigan. The team was led by head coach Brady Hoke, who was in his third season. The season ended with a record of 7–6 overall (3–5 in conference play).

The Wolverines won 6 of their first 7 games, including a 41–30 victory over rival #14 Notre Dame. After defeating the Indiana Hoosiers 63–47, Michigan only won one more game and lost four more heading into this bowl game.

=== Kansas State ===
The Kansas State Wildcats represented Kansas State University for the 2013 NCAA Division I FBS football season. The Wildcats played their home games at Bill Snyder Family Stadium in Manhattan, Kansas as they had done since 1968.

The Wildcats were led by head coach Bill Snyder in his 22nd overall and fifth straight season since taking over his second tenure in 2009. Kansas State began their season with four losses in their first six games, including a 24–21 season opener against North Dakota State Bison, a program that competed in the 2013 NCAA Division I FCS football season. North Dakota State went on to finish the season undefeated with a record of 15–0 and won their third consecutive FCS Championship.

As a member of the Big 12 Conference, the team began conference play with a loss to the Texas Longhorns. The regular season ended with a win over in-state rival Kansas in the Sunflower Showdown. The Wildcats completed their regular season with a 7–5 record (5-4 in conference play) by winning five of their final six regular season games, including a 49–26 win over #25 Texas Tech.

== Scoring summary ==
Kansas State scored first with a touchdown pass from Jake Waters to Tyler Lockett in the first quarter and K-State's kicker Ian Patterson made good on the extra point to take the lead 7–0. Kansas State maintained the lead for the remainder of the game. At halftime, Kansas State led 21–6 with Tyler Lockett receiving three touchdown passes from Jake Waters and Michigan succeeding with two field goals. After no score in the third quarter, Michigan's Fitzgerald Toussaint ran the ball three yards for a touchdown while Kansas State's Patterson made a field goal and John Hubert ran in a touchdown for 1 yard.

Scoring summary

Quarter	Time	Drive			Team	Scoring information	Score	
Quarter	Time	Plays	Yards	TOP	Team	Scoring information	MICH	KSTATE
1	7:19	15	75	7:41	Kansas State	Tyler Lockett 6-yard touchdown reception from Jake Waters, Ian Patterson kick good	0	7
1	3:32	8	58	3:47	Michigan	22-yard field goal by Matt Wile	3	7
1	0:43	5	60	2:49	Kansas State	Lockett 29-yard touchdown reception from Waters, Patterson kick good	3	14
2	7:09	14	68	8:34	Michigan	26-yard field goal by Wile	6	14
2	4:30	4	59	2:39	Kansas State	Lockett 8-yard touchdown reception from Waters, Patterson kick good	6	21
4	7:09	11	60	6:33	Kansas State	22-yard field goal by Patterson	6	24
4	2:25	2	7	0:48	Kansas State	John Hubert 8-yard touchdown run, Patterson kick good	6	31
4	1:15	5	82	1:10	Michigan	Fitzgerald Toussaint 3-yard touchdown run, 2-point pass good	14	31
"TOP" = time of possession. For other American football terms, see Glossary of American football.							14	31

=== Statistics ===
Statistic	MICH	KSU
First downs	15	21
Total offense, plays – yards	53–261	64–420
Rushes-yards (net)	15–65	36–149
Passing yards (net)	196	271
Passes, Comp-Att-Int	24–38–1	21–28–0
Time of Possession	24:56	34:00

== Results ==
Kansas State won the game by a score of 31–14. Many sportswriters determined that Kansas State controlled the Michigan team through the entire game and one wrote "Kansas State dominates Michigan in Buffalo Wild Wings Bowl" to summarize the results. Another wrote that "K-State could be a 2014 Big 12 title contender" after the results of the game. Supporters of Michigan used the results to highlight high hopes for the upcoming seasons with comments such as "The young guys are the bright spot for this team."

Kansas State's Tyler Lockett was named the offensive MVP. Lockett finished the game with ten catches for 116 yards and three touchdowns to tie the Bowl record. Kansas State safety Dante Barnett was awarded the Defensive MVP. Barnett recorded a team-high eight tackles and an interception with a 51-yard return to the Michigan seven-yard line.

Kansas State quarterback Jake Waters was named the overall Most Valuable Player of the game.

== Viewing issue at Buffalo Wild Wings ==
Throughout Michigan, Wolverine fans decided to visit their local Buffalo Wild Wings restaurant to watch the game. However, upon arrival they learned that the restaurants were featuring UFC 168: Weidman vs. Silva 2, a mixed martial arts event held roughly that same time at the MGM Grand Garden Arena in Las Vegas, Nevada.

In the state of Michigan, customers were reduced to watching the bowl game on a small number of televisions with no sound. A corporate officer of Buffalo Wild Wings welcomed viewers to the game and encouraged people to watch a bowl game at one of their restaurants and at the same time disgruntled fans at the restaurants reported via Twitter that they were in the wrong place to watch the game on big screens and with sound.
