= 2013 Kansas State Wildcats football team =

American college football season

2013 Kansas State Wildcats football

Buffalo Wild Wings Bowl champion

Buffalo Wild Wings Bowl, W 31–14 vs. Michigan
- Conference: Big 12 Conference
- Record: 8–5 (5–4 Big 12)
- Head coach: Bill Snyder (22nd season)
- Co-offensive coordinators: Dana Dimel (7th season); Del Miller (14th season)
- Offensive scheme: Multiple
- Defensive coordinator: Tom Hayes (2nd season)
- Base defense: 4–3
- Captains: Tyler Lockett; B. J. Finney; Blake Slaughter; Tre Walker; Ty Zimmerman
- Home stadium: Bill Snyder Family Football Stadium

2013 Big 12 Conference football standings
	Conf.			Overall
Team	W		L	W		L
No. 13 Baylor $	8	–	1	11	–	2
No. 6 Oklahoma %	7	–	2	11	–	2
No. 17 Oklahoma State	7	–	2	10	–	3
Texas	7	–	2	8	–	5
Kansas State	5	–	4	8	–	5
Texas Tech	4	–	5	8	–	5
TCU	2	–	7	4	–	8
West Virginia	2	–	7	4	–	8
Iowa State	2	–	7	3	–	9
Kansas	1	–	8	3	–	9
$ – BCS representative as conference champion; % – BCS at-large representative; Rankings from AP Poll

The 2013 Kansas State Wildcats football team represented Kansas State University in the 2013 NCAA Division I FBS football season. The Wildcats play their home games at Bill Snyder Family Football Stadium, in Manhattan, Kansas as they have since 1968. 2013 is the 118th season in school history. The Wildcats are led by head coach Bill Snyder in his 22nd overall and fifth straight season since taking over in his second tenure in 2009. K-State is a member of the Big 12 Conference. Conference play began with a loss to Texas, their first since 2003, which ended a 5-game winning streak against the Longhorns. The regular season ended with a win over in-state rival Kansas in the Sunflower Showdown. After completing the regular season with a 7–5 record, the Kansas State Wildcats returned for a bowl game for the fourth straight year, were selected to play in the 2013 Buffalo Wild Wings Bowl and played the Michigan Wolverines. The season ended with the Wildcats defeating the Wolverines, 31–14, to break a five-game bowl losing streak winning their first bowl game since the 2002 Holiday Bowl and finishing the season 8–5.

== Off-season ==
The off-season saw the completion of the West Stadium Center of Bill Snyder Family Football Stadium.

=== Scholarship recruits ===
College recruiting
Name	Hometown	School	Height	Weight	40^{‡}	Commit date
Allen, Chance; OL	Klein, Texas	Klein Collins	6 ft 5 in (1.96 m)	295 lb (134 kg)	5.2	May 1, 2012
Allen, Chance; OL	Recruit ratings: Scout: Rivals: ESPN:					
Brager, Ajhane; OL	Magnolia, Texas	Magnolia	6 ft 4 in (1.93 m)	280 lb (130 kg)	n/a	Dec 10, 2012
Brager, Ajhane; OL	Recruit ratings: Scout: Rivals: ESPN:					
Brown, Chris; DT	Mesa, Arizona	Scottsdale CC	6 ft 4 in (1.93 m)	330 lb (150 kg)	n/a	Jan 20, 2013
Brown, Chris; DT	Recruit ratings: Scout: Rivals: ESPN:					
Ertz, Jesse; QB	Mediapolis, Iowa	Mediapolis	6 ft 4 in (1.93 m)	190 lb (86 kg)	n/a	Aug 8, 2012
Ertz, Jesse; QB	Recruit ratings: Scout: Rivals: ESPN:					
Gordon, LeAndrew; WR	Arlington, Texas	Pantego Christian	5 ft 7 in (1.70 m)	160 lb (73 kg)	4.4	Feb 24, 2012
Gordon, LeAndrew; WR	Recruit ratings: Scout: Rivals: ESPN:					
Green, Travis; DB	Omaha, Nebraska	Iowa Western CC	6 ft 1 in (1.85 m)	207 lb (94 kg)	4.5	Nov 26, 2012
Green, Travis; DB	Recruit ratings: Scout: Rivals: ESPN:					
Jackson, Nate; DB	Daly City, California	San Mateo	5 ft 11 in (1.80 m)	185 lb (84 kg)	4.5	Dec 7, 2012
Jackson, Nate; DB	Recruit ratings: Scout: Rivals: ESPN:					
Johnson, Dakorey; LB	Mesquite, Texas	Trinity Valley CC	6 ft 3 in (1.91 m)	200 lb (91 kg)	4.5	Dec 16, 2012
Johnson, Dakorey; LB	Recruit ratings: Scout: Rivals: ESPN:					
McCrane, Matthew; K	Brownwood, Texas	Brownwood	5 ft 11 in (1.80 m)	165 lb (75 kg)	n/a	Dec 10, 2012
McCrane, Matthew; K	Recruit ratings: Scout: Rivals: ESPN:					
Overall recruit ranking:
Note: In many cases, Scout, Rivals, 247Sports, On3, and ESPN may conflict in their listings of height and weight.; In these cases, the average was taken. ESPN grades are on a 100-point scale.; Sources:

== Schedule ==
Date	Time	Opponent	Site	TV	Result	Attendance
August 30	7:30 p.m.	No. 1 (FCS) North Dakota State*	Bill Snyder Family Football Stadium; Manhattan, KS	FS1	L 21–24	53,351
September 7	5:30 p.m.	Louisiana–Lafayette*	Bill Snyder Family Football Stadium; Manhattan, KS	FS1	W 48–27	53,073
September 14	6:00 p.m.	UMass*	Bill Snyder Family Football Stadium; Manhattan, KS	K-StateHD.TV	W 37–7	52,894
September 21	7:00 p.m.	at Texas	Darrell K Royal–Texas Memorial Stadium; Austin, TX	ABC	L 21–31	95,248
October 5	2:30 p.m.	at No. 21 Oklahoma State	Boone Pickens Stadium; Stillwater, OK	ABC	L 29–33	58,841
October 12	2:30 p.m.	No. 15 Baylor	Bill Snyder Family Football Stadium; Manhattan, KS	FOX	L 25–35	52,803
October 26	2:45 p.m.	West Virginia^{†}	Bill Snyder Family Football Stadium; Manhattan, KS	FS1	W 35–12	52,898
November 2	2:30 p.m.	Iowa State	Bill Snyder Family Football Stadium; Manhattan, KS (rivalry)	FS1	W 41–7	52,542
November 9	11:00 a.m.	at No. 25 Texas Tech	Jones AT&T Stadium; Lubbock, TX	ABC	W 49–26	54,609
November 16	2:30 p.m.	TCU	Bill Snyder Family Football Stadium; Manhattan, KS	FSN	W 33–31	52,697
November 23	11:00 a.m.	No. 22 Oklahoma	Bill Snyder Family Football Stadium; Manhattan, KS (rivalry)	FS1	L 31–41	52,773
November 30	11:00 a.m.	at Kansas	Memorial Stadium; Lawrence, KS (rivalry)	FS1	W 31–10	43,610
December 28	9:15 p.m.	vs. Michigan*	Sun Devil Stadium; Tempe, AZ (Buffalo Wild Wings Bowl)	ESPN	W 31–14	53,284
*Non-conference game; ^{†}Homecoming; Rankings from AP Poll released prior to the game; All times are in Central time

== Game summaries ==
=== North Dakota State ===
	1	2	3	4	Total
#1 (FCS) North Dakota State	7	0	10	7	24
Kansas State	0	7	14	0	21

The Wildcats were favored by 11 going into the game. The game was debut of K-State's brand new West Stadium Center, a brand new press box and luxury suite building, and featuring a statue of head coach Bill Snyder, replacing the old structure built in 1993. The Bison spoiled the opening game of the Wildcats' season, which featured a pre-game ceremony of raising the 2012 Big 12 Conference Champions flag. North Dakota State, trailing 21–17 in the middle of the fourth quarter, made an eight-minute touchdown drive to go up by 2 points with just 28 seconds remaining. New K-State quarterback Jake Waters threw an interception on the Wildcats' first play of the possession, sealing the victory for the two-time defending FCS champions.

North Dakota State went on to finish the season undefeated with a record of 15–0 and won their third consecutive FCS Championship.

=== Louisiana–Lafayette ===
	1	2	3	4	Total
Louisiana–Lafayette	3	0	14	10	27
Kansas State	10	10	21	7	48

The Wildcats were favored by 10 going into the game. Kansas State scored 10 points in each of the first two quarters while giving up just 3 points in the half. Tramaine Thompason returned the opening kickoff of the second half 94 yards for a touchdown. Moments later, Thompson returned a Louisiana–Lafayette punt 79 yards to the Rajin' Cajun 2-yard line. Following a Jake Waters 1-yard touchdown run, Louisiana–Lafayette returned the ensuing kickoff 100 yards for a touchdown. In the fourth quarter K-State's Ty Zimmerman returned an interception 32 yards for a touchdown after the ball deflected off of a Rajin' Cajun player's helmet. K-State was able to score on offense, defense, and special teams in the second half alone. K-State leads the nation for most non-offense touchdowns since 1999.

=== UMass ===
	1	2	3	4	Total
UMass	7	0	0	0	7
Kansas State	6	21	7	3	37

The Wildcats were favored by 38 1/2 going into the game.

=== Texas ===
	1	2	3	4	Total
Kansas State	0	7	0	14	21
Texas	10	7	7	7	31

The Longhorns were favored by 5 going into the game.

=== Oklahoma State ===
	1	2	3	4	Total
Kansas State	7	7	7	8	29
#21 Oklahoma State	7	10	6	10	33

The Cowboys were favored by 11 1/2 going into the game.

=== Baylor ===
	1	2	3	4	Total
#15 Baylor	7	14	0	14	35
Kansas State	0	10	15	0	25

The Bears were favored by 17 1/2 going to the game.

=== West Virginia ===
	1	2	3	4	Total
West Virginia	0	9	3	0	12
Kansas State	7	0	7	21	35

The Wildcats were favored by 11 1/2 going into the game.

=== Iowa State ===
	1	2	3	4	Total
Iowa State	0	0	0	7	7
Kansas State	10	7	3	21	41

The Wildcats were favored by 17 going into the game.

=== Texas Tech ===
	1	2	3	4	Total
Kansas State	14	21	0	14	49
Texas Tech	10	0	9	7	26

The Red Raiders were favored by 11 going into the game.

=== TCU ===
	1	2	3	4	Total
TCU	0	7	21	3	31
Kansas State	14	3	10	6	33

The Wildcats were favored by 11 going into the game.

=== Oklahoma ===
	1	2	3	4	Total
#22 Oklahoma	7	17	17	0	41
Kansas State	0	21	3	7	31

K-State was favored by 4 going into the game.

=== Kansas ===
	1	2	3	4	Total
Kansas State	14	7	7	3	31
Kansas	0	10	0	0	10

=== Michigan (2013 Buffalo Wild Wings Bowl) ===
Michigan vs. Kansas State
(Buffalo Wild Wings Bowl)

Team	1	2	3	4	Total
Wolverines	3	3	0	8	14
• Wildcats	14	7	0	10	31

- Date: December 28
- Location: Sun Devil Stadium
  Tempe, Arizona
- Game start: 10:15 p.m. EST
- Elapsed time: 3:03
- Game attendance: 53,284
- Game weather: 61°F, High clouds, W 7 MPH
- Referee: Land Clark
- TV announcers (ESPN): Sean McDonough, Chris Spielman & Shannon Spake

K-State was favored by 7 going into the game. Kansas State played the Michigan Wolverines on December 28, 2013 at Sun Devil Stadium in Tempe, Arizona for the 2013 Buffalo Wild Wings Bowl.

Kansas State scored first with a touchdown pass from Jake Waters to Tyler Lockett in the first quarter and K-State's kicker Ian Patterson made good on the extra point to take the lead 7–0. Kansas State maintained the lead for the remainder of the game. At halftime, Kansas State led 21–6 with Tyler Lockett receiving three touchdown passes from Jake Waters and Michigan succeeding with two field goals. After no score in the third quarter, Michigan's Fitzgerald Toussaint ran the ball three yards for a touchdown while Kansas State's Patterson made a field goal and John Hubert ran in a touchdown for 1 yard.

Kansas State won the game by a score of 31–14. Many sportswriters determined that Kansas State controlled the Michigan team through the entire game and one wrote "Kansas State dominates Michigan in Buffalo Wild Wings Bowl" to summarize the results. Another wrote that "K-State could be a 2014 Big 12 title contender" after the results of the game. Supporters of Michigan used the results to highlight high hopes for the upcoming seasons with comments such as "The young guys are the bright spot for this team."

Kansas State's Tyler Lockett was named the offensive MVP. Lockett finished the game with ten catches for 116 yards and three touchdowns to tie the Bowl record. Kansas State safety Dante Barnett was awarded the Defensive MVP. Barnett recorded a team-high eight tackles and an interception with a 51-yard return to the Michigan seven-yard line.

Kansas State Quarterback Jake Waters was named the overall Most Valuable Player of the game.

Scoring summary

Quarter	Time	Drive			Team	Scoring information	Score	
Quarter	Time	Plays	Yards	TOP	Team	Scoring information	Michigan	Kansas State
1	7:19	15	75	7:41	Kansas State	Tyler Lockett 6-yard touchdown reception from Jake Waters, Ian Patterson kick good	0	7
1	3:32	8	58	3:47	Michigan	22-yard field goal by Matt Wile	3	7
1	0:43	5	60	2:49	Kansas State	Lockett 29-yard touchdown reception from Waters, Patterson kick good	3	14
2	7:09	14	68	8:34	Michigan	26-yard field goal by Wile	6	14
2	4:30	4	59	2:39	Kansas State	Lockett 8-yard touchdown reception from Waters, Patterson kick good	6	21
4	7:09	11	60	6:33	Kansas State	22-yard field goal by Patterson	6	24
4	2:25	2	7	0:48	Kansas State	John Hubert 8-yard touchdown run, Patterson kick good	6	31
4	1:15	5	82	1:10	Michigan	Fitzgerald Toussaint 3-yard touchdown run, 2-point pass good	14	31
"TOP" = time of possession. For other American football terms, see Glossary of American football.							14	31

=== Statistics ===
Statistics	Michigan	Kansas State
First downs	15	21
Total offense, plays – yards	53–261	64–420
Rushes-yards (net)	15–65	36–149
Passing yards (net)	196	271
Passes, Comp-Att-Int	24–38–1	21–28–0
Time of Possession	24:56	34:00

== Rankings ==
Ranking movements Legend: ██ Increase in ranking ██ Decrease in ranking — = Not ranked RV = Received votes
	Week																
Poll	Pre	1	2	3	4	5	6	7	8	9	10	11	12	13	14	15	Final
AP	RV	—	—	—	—	—	—	—	—	—	—	—	—	—	—	—	RV
Coaches	RV	RV	RV	RV	—	—	—	—	—	—	—	—	—	—	—	—	RV
Harris	Not released							—	—	—	—	RV	—	—	—	—	Not released
BCS	Not released								—	—	—	—	—	—	—	—	Not released

== Roster ==
2013 roster
Quarterbacks: 4 Daniel Sams – (redshirt) So.; 15 Jake Waters – Jr.; 8 Joe Hubener – (redshirt) Fr.; Running backs: 5 Robert Rose – Jr.; 20 DeMarcus Robinson – Jr.; 24 Charles Jones – Fr.; 28 Jarvis Leverett – Fr.; 33 John Hubert – Sr.; 41 Seth Filbert – Fr.; Full backs: 27 Brad Duncan – So.; 39 Austin Katsorelos – Fr.; 48 Glenn Gronkowski – Fr.; Wide receivers: 2 Stephen Johnson – Jr.; 10 Lucas Munds – Fr.; 12 Stanton Weber – (redshirt) So.; 13 Steven West – Sor.; 14 Curry Sexton – Jr.; 16 Tyler Lockett – Jr.; 17 Logan Stephens – Jr.; 21 Destin Mosley – Fr.; 23 Collin Sexton – ' (redshirt) Fr.; 25 Dylan Veatch – So.; 26 Cody Harrison – So.; 81 Kyle Klein – (redshirt) So.; 82 Evan Loomis – Jr.; 84 Deante Burton – ' (redshirt) Fr.; 86 Tramaine Thompson – Sr.; 87 Andre Jackson – ' (redshirt) Jr.; 88 Torell Miller – Sr.; Tight ends: 18 Andre McDonald – Sr.; 41 Logan Haug – Fr.; 43 Matt Pestinger – Jr.; 47 William Green – (redshirt) Jr.; 81 Jeremy Sutton – Jr.; 82 Tyler Davidson – Fr.; 84 Curtis Hubbell – Jr.; 85 Zach Trujillo – So.; 89 Zach Nemechek – Fr.	Offensive line: 46 Dalton Converse – So. (Long snapper); 51 Cameron McLain – Fr.; 52 John McClure – Fr.; 55 Cody Whitehair – (redshirt) Fr.; 61 Drew Liddle – So.; 63 Marcus Heit – Jr. (Long snapper); 64 Tomasi Mariner -So.; 65 Matt Kleinsorge – (redshirt) Fr.; 66 B. J. Finney – So.; 68 William Cooper – Jr.; 70 Will Ash – Fr.; 72 Aderius Epps – Fr.; 73 Tavon Rooks – Sr.; 74 Kason Hostrup – (redshirt) Fr.; 75 Ellwood Clement – Jr.; 76 Cory Cheadle – Fr. (Long snapper); 77 Boston Stiverson – (redshirt) Fr.; 78 Cornelius Lucas – Sr.; 79 Keneen Taylor – Sr.; Defensive line: 41 Logan Haug – (redshirt) Fr.; 43 Wyatt Schroeder – Fr.; 44 Ryan Mueller – Jr.; 45 Marquel Bryant – (redshirt) Fr.; 54 Taylor Godinet – So.; 55 Adam Davis – Jr.; 56 Wesley Hollingshed – Jr.; 60 Dustin Sobieraj – Jr.; 62 Logan Wiltfong – Fr.; 69 Logan O'Dea – Fr.; 73 Xavier Gates – (redshirt) Fr.; 90 Laton Dowling – So.; 91 Hakeem Akinola – Jr.; 94 Alauna Finau – Jr.; 95 Travis Britz – Fr.; 97 Demonte Hood – Fr.; 98 Chaquil Reed – Jr.	Linebackers: 6 Tate Snyder – So.; 20 Riley Williams – Fr.; 21 Jonathan Truman – Fr.; 33 Weston Hiebert – Fr.; 34 Cody Marley – So.; 35 David Smith – So.; 40 Antonio Felder – Jr.; 49 Will Davis – Fr.; 50 Tre Walker – Jr.; 51 Trace Armstrong – Fr.; 52 Mike Moore – Fr.; 53 Blake Slaughter – Sr.; 55 Kadero Terrell – Jr.; 58 Clarence Bumpas – Fr.; 57 Colborn Couchman – Fr.; 58 Myles Copeland – Fr.; 59 Aaron Norris – (redshirt) Fr.; Defensive backs: 7 Kip Daily – (redshirt) Jr.; 10 Donny Starks – Fr.; 12 Ty Zimmerman – Jr.; 15 Randall Evans – So.; 17 Weston Hiebert – So.; 18 Jonathan Coleman – (redshirt) Fr.; 19 Carl Miles Jr. – Jr.; 22 Dante Barnett – Fr.; 25 Joseph Bonugli – So.; 27 Ed Brown – So.; 29 Kent Gainous – Jr.; 30 Dorian Roberts – (redshirt) Fr.; 32 Michael Mann – Fr.; 33 Morgan Burns – Fr.; 39 Cameron Morgan – Fr.; 40 Dylan Schellenberg – So.; Punters: 38 Mark Krause – (redshirt) Fr.; 48 Ethan Hammes – So.; Kickers: 6 Brandon Klimek – Sr.; 8 Dillon Wilson – (redshirt) Fr.; 14 Jack Cantele – (redshirt) Fr.

== Coaching staff ==
The following is a list of coaches at Kansas State for the 2013 season.

Name	Position	Seasons at Kansas State	Alma mater
Bill Snyder	Head coach	21	William Jewell (1963)
Tom Hayes	Defensive coordinator/defensive Passing Game coordinator/defensive backs	3	Iowa (1971)
Mike Cox	Linebackers	2	Idaho (1989)
Mo Latimore	Defensive line	30	Kansas State (1976)
Sean Snyder	Associate head coach/special teams coordinator	18	Kansas State (1994)
Dana Dimel	Co-offensive coordinator/running backs/tight ends	16	Kansas State (1986)
Del Miller	Co-offensive coordinator/quarterbacks	17	Central (1972)
Charlie Dickey	Offensive line	5	Arizona (1987)
Andre Coleman	Wide receivers	1	Kansas State (1994)
Blake Seiler	Defensive ends	3	Kansas State (2006)
