= Christopher Hackett =

Christopher or Chris Hackett may refer to:

- Chris Hackett (American football) (born 1993), American football player
- Chris Hackett (artist) (born 1972), American artist, engineer, and television presenter
- Chris Hackett (footballer) (born 1983), English footballer
- Chris Hackett (Pennsylvania politician), American politician
- Christopher Fitzherbert Hackett, Barbadian diplomat
