= Tyler Lockett =

American football player (born 1992)

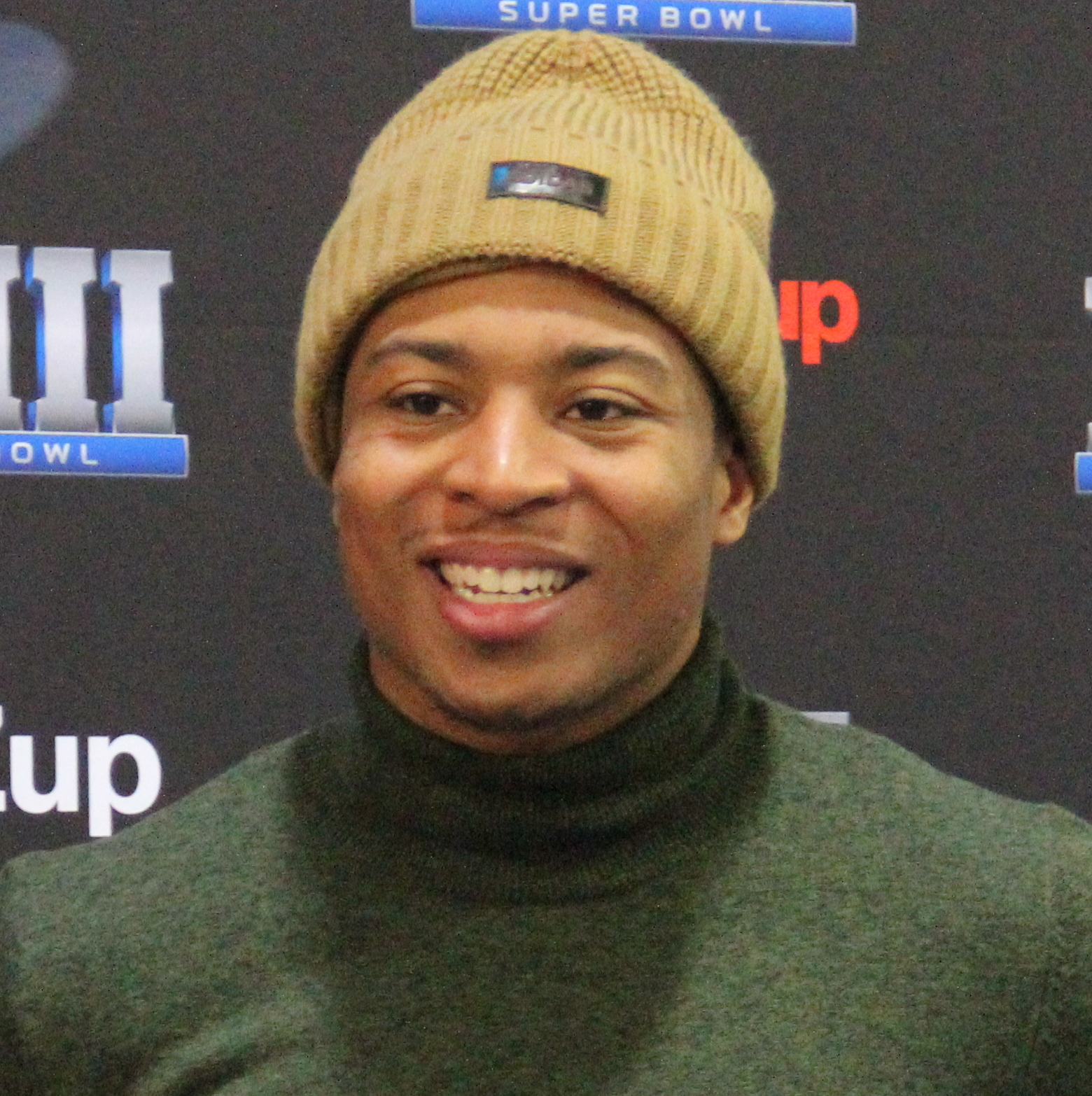
- Lockett in 2019

Profile
- Position: Wide receiver

Personal information
- Born: September 28, 1992 (age 34); Tulsa, Oklahoma, U.S.
- Listed height: 5 ft 10 in (1.78 m)
- Listed weight: 182 lb (83 kg)

Career information
- High school: Booker T. Washington (Tulsa)
- College: Kansas State (2011–2014)
- NFL draft: 2015: 3rd round, 69th overall pick

Career history
- Seattle Seahawks (2015–2024); Tennessee Titans (2025); Las Vegas Raiders (2025)

Awards and highlights
- First-team All-Pro (2015) (Note: Selected as a return specialist); 2× Second-team All-Pro (2016, 2017) (Note: Selected as a kick returner); Pro Bowl (2015); NFL kickoff return yards leader (2017); PFWA All-Rookie Team (2015); Seattle Seahawks Top 50 players; Jet Award (2014); Consensus All-American (2014); First-team All-American (2011); NCAA average punt return yards leader (2014); 2× Big 12 Special Teams Player of the Year (2013, 2014); 2× First-team All-Big 12 (2013, 2014); 2× Second-team All-Big 12 (2011, 2012); Big 12 Offensive Freshman of the Year (2011); Kansas State Wildcats Ring of Honor

Career NFL statistics as of 2025
- Games played: 178
- Receptions: 693
- Receiving yards: 8,885
- Receiving touchdowns: 62
- Return yards: 4,266
- Return touchdowns: 3
- Rushing yards: 265
- Rushing touchdowns: 1
- Stats at Pro Football Reference

Tyler Deron Lockett (born September 28, 1992) is an American professional football player in the National Football League (NFL). A wide receiver, he played college football for the Kansas State Wildcats and was selected by the Seattle Seahawks in the third round of the 2015 NFL draft. Lockett has also played for the Tennessee Titans and the Las Vegas Raiders.

In college, he set numerous Kansas State football records and was both a 2011 All-American (as a kickoff returner) and 2014 College Football All-America Team consensus All-American selection (as a punt returner). In college, he totaled 6,586 career all-purpose yards and 35 touchdowns, including 3,710 yards and 29 touchdowns as a receiver. In his freshman college season for the 2011 Wildcats, Lockett was an All-American return specialist, despite being injured after nine games and missing the rest of the season. In 2012, he was an honorable mention All-Big 12 Conference performer for the 2012 team. In 2013, he was a first team All-Big 12 performer for the 2013 team at both wide receiver and all-purpose receiver. That season, he established school records for single-game receiving yards, single game all-purpose yards and career kickoff return yards. As a senior for the 2014 team, he surpassed his father's school career records for receiving yards, receptions and receiving touchdowns. As a senior, he was the Big 12 Conference leader in receiving yards and the national leader in punt return average.

Lockett was selected by the Seattle Seahawks 69th overall in the third round of the 2015 NFL draft. In his first season, he was the NFC Special Teams Player of the Month for September, scoring both a punt and kickoff return touchdown in his first three games. He became the second rookie to win multiple Special Teams Player of the Month awards and was the only rookie to be named 1st team All-Pro for the 2015 NFL season. He was also selected to the 2015 Pro Football Writers Association (PFWA) NFL All-Rookie Team at three positions. Lockett became a starting wide receiver and amassed over 1,000 receiving yards in 2019, 2020, 2021 and 2022. Lockett's totals of 8,594 receiving yards, 661 receptions and 61 receiving touchdowns are second in franchise history, behind only Steve Largent.

== Family ==
Lockett was born in Tulsa, Oklahoma, to Nicole Edwards and Kevin Lockett, who played at Kansas State from 1993 to 1996. Kevin was the school's all-time leading receiver before being passed by Tyler, who also plays in the NFL. Kevin played for four NFL teams, including the Kansas City Chiefs. Tyler's uncle, Aaron, played for Kansas State from 1998 to 2001, and is their fourth all-time leading receiver and second all-time leading punt returner. Aaron also won a Grey Cup with the BC Lions in 2006. Aaron also holds Big 12 Conference records and set the school record in the 60 meters. Tyler's younger brother, Sterling, committed to Kansas State for their 2022 recruitment class. Kansas State head coach Bill Snyder had coached his father and uncle.

== Early life ==
He attended Barnard Elementary, Carver Middle School, and then Booker T. Washington High School in Tulsa, where he was a three-sport star in football, basketball, and track and field. He helped lead the Booker T. Washington Hornets to Oklahoma Secondary School Activities Association (OSSAA) championships in both football and basketball. As a sophomore, he made several notable contributions to the team on its way to the school's first football OSSAA championship in 24 years. As a junior, Lockett played most of the year with a broken wrist that had at first been diagnosed as a severe sprain. He suffered the injury in the second game of the football season and did not have a screw put in his wrist until after the basketball season ended. Booker T. Washington compiled a 13–1 record and won the 2010 OSSAA 5A championship in football his senior year. Lockett played several positions in high school, and he was voted All-State by the Oklahoma Coaches Association as a defensive back and Class 5A All-State as a wide receiver. His All-State selection got him invited to the state East–West All-Star game.

In addition to football, Lockett also was a top competitor in basketball and track. In basketball, his team reached the state championship game, where Booker T. Washington defeated El Reno High School 72–59 to win the 2011 OSSA 5A Championship. He was voted to the all-tournament second team. In track & field, Lockett was one of the state's top sprinters. He captured a regional title in the 100-meter dash at the 2011 State 5A Regional, placing first with a time of 10.85 seconds. He earned third-place finishes in both the 100-meter dash (10.95 s) and the 200-meter dash (21.90 s) at the 5A state finals.

Regarded as a three-star recruit by Rivals.com, Lockett was ranked as the number 16 player in the state of Oklahoma, and the No. 170 nationally by ESPN.com. According to Scout.com, he was ranked as the No. 115 cornerback in the nation. He was rated as the 16th best high school football player in the state of Oklahoma class of 2011 by Rivals.com, the 115th best cornerback in the national class of 2011 by Scout.com, and the 170th best wide receiver in the class by ESPN.com. He chose Kansas State over a scholarship offer from Kansas.

College recruiting
Name	Hometown	School	Height	Weight	40^{‡}	Commit date
Tyler Lockett; WR	Tulsa, OK	Booker T. Washington High School	5 ft 9 in (1.75 m)	160 lb (73 kg)		Apr 28, 2010
Tyler Lockett; WR	Recruit ratings: Scout: Rivals: 247Sports: (74)					
Overall recruit ranking: Scout: 115 (CB) Rivals: 16 (OK-WR) ESPN: 170 (WR)
Note: In many cases, Scout, Rivals, 247Sports, On3, and ESPN may conflict in their listings of height and weight.; In these cases, the average was taken. ESPN grades are on a 100-point scale.; Sources: "2011 Kansas State Football Commits". Rivals.; "2011 Kansas State Football Commits". Scout.; "ESPN". ESPN.; "Scout.com Team Recruiting Rankings". Scout.; "2011 Team Ranking". Rivals.com.

== College career ==
Lockett received an athletic scholarship to attend Kansas State University, where he played for coach Bill Snyder's Kansas State Wildcats football team from 2011 to 2014. Both his father Kevin and uncle Aaron played wide receiver for the Wildcats under Snyder. The Wildcats' receivers coach Michael Smith has also coached Lockett, his father, and his uncle.

=== Freshman season (2011) ===
Lockett had hoped to redshirt during the 2011 season, his freshman year, so that he could gain muscle mass in the weight room, but he played as a true freshman. He got off to a modest start. Lockett only recorded four receptions for 50 yards, three rushes for nine yards, one kickoff return for ten yards, and two punt returns for a total of 13 yards in his first five games through October 8. Things started to turn around on October 15 when he posted a 100-yard return of a kickoff for a touchdown against Texas Tech. Over the ensuing weeks, he earned numerous Big 12 Conference honors for the 2011 team, including becoming a two-time Big 12 Special Teams Player of the Week. His first Player of the Week recognition came on October 24 after he produced a 251-yard all-purpose yards performance on October 22 against Kansas in the Governor's Cup that included a 97-yard kickoff return touchdown while becoming the first player in school history to return kickoffs for touchdowns in consecutive games and having a career-high five-reception, 110-yard receiving day. His other Player of the Week recognition that season came on November 7 after a 315-yard all-purpose yard November 5 game against Oklahoma State that included an 80-yard kickoff return and three rushes for 84 yards as well as three receptions for 32 yards and a touchdown. Due to what was at first an undisclosed injury, he did not play in the final three games of Kansas State's regular season. Later, the injury was determined to be a lacerated kidney. In the four games before the injury, he had at least three receptions and 125 all-purpose yards in each game.

He was the Big 12 Offensive Freshman of the Year, a second-team All-Big 12 selection as a kickoff returner/punt returner, and an honorable mention selection as a wide receiver. He was a first-team All-American selection by Sporting News and the Walter Camp Football Foundation, and a second-team All-American selection by CBS Sports and Sports Illustrated. As a result of the extent of his honors, he was recognized as a consensus All-American by the NCAA. He also picked up numerous All-Freshman honors from Sporting News, Football Writers Association of America (FWAA), CBS Sports, Rivals.com (2nd team) and College Football News (honorable mention, WR). Lockett failed to play in 75 percent of the Wildcats' games to be eligible to be the NCAA statistical leader for average kickoff return yardage. Although Lockett averaged 35.19 yards per return (16 returns for 563 yards), another freshman, Raheem Mostert of Purdue, led the NCAA statistical category with a 33.48 average.

=== Sophomore season (2012) ===
Lockett entered the season as a preseason All-Big 12 first team selection by the Big 12 media as a kickoff returner, but ESPN only listed him as an honorable mention selection, giving the first team honor to Oklahoma State's Justin Gilbert. On September 15, Lockett posted his third career kickoff return touchdown against North Texas, by returning a first quarter kickoff 96 yards. He earned Big 12 Conference Special Teams Player of the Week honors on September 17. On October 20, he posted career highs in receptions (9), receiving yards (194), and receiving touchdowns (2) against West Virginia, giving him the fifth highest single-game receiving yardage total in school history. His fourth career kickoff return touchdown occurred on November 3 against Oklahoma State. This earned Lockett another Big 12 Special Teams Player of the Week. On November 15, Lockett earned a second team Academic All-Big 12 selection. Lockett was a 2012 All-Big 12 honorable mention selection both at wide receiver and special teams. He was also an honorable mention All-American return specialist selection by Sports Illustrated.

=== Junior season (2013) ===
Prior to the 2013 season, Lockett was recognized as a 2013 Allstate/American Football Coaches Association (AFCA) Good Works Team nominee. He opened the season with 7 receptions for 113 yards, including a 56-yard touchdown pass, against North Dakota State on August 30. The following week, he added 111 yards against Louisiana–Lafayette on 8 receptions. On September 21, he connected with quarterback Jake Waters for 13 receptions for 237 yards against Texas in the 2013 Big 12 Conference season opener and had an additional 96 return yards on kickoffs. 237 receiving yards is a Kansas State single-game record, surpassing Jordy Nelson's 214 yards against Iowa State on November 3, 2007. This receiving yardage total was the 2nd highest in the first four weeks of the season behind Texas A&M wideout Mike Evans' 297 yards. Lockett suffered a hamstring injury in the first half of the October 5 contest against Oklahoma State. He returned to the lineup on October 26, to post three touchdowns and 111 yards on 8 receptions and help Kansas State achieve its first Big 12 win of the season against West Virginia. On November 16, Lockett posted 8 receptions for 123 yards, including a 74-yard touchdown reception against TCU. One week later, Lockett caught 12 passes for 278 yards and 3 touchdowns against Oklahoma. He also returned 5 kickoffs for 162 yards. Lockett broke his own Kansas State single-game record for receiving yards and surpassed Darren Sproles for the Kansas State single-game all-purpose yards record (440). Lockett was named the Big 12 Conference Special Teams Player of the Week on November 25 upon becoming the all-time Kansas state leader in career kickoff return yards with 1,780. His 278 single-game receiving yards was fourth in Big 12 history and his 440 single-game all-purpose yards ranked second in Big 12 history and fifth in FBS history. Following the season, he was recognized as an All-Big 12 Conference first team selection as both a wide receiver and an all-purpose player. FWAA named him second team All-American at wide receiver and Sports Illustrated gave him honorable mention All-American recognition as an all-purpose player. In the December 28, 2013 Buffalo Wild Wings Bowl, Lockett had 10 receptions for 116 yards and 3 touchdowns against Michigan. Lockett's performance marked the most receptions by any receiver in a Buffalo Wild Wings Bowl and the most receptions in a Bowl game by a Kansas State receiver.

=== Senior season (2014) ===
Lockett entered his senior season as a preseason All-Big 12 selection as well as a Walter Camp Award, Maxwell Award, Paul Hornung Award, and Biletnikoff Award watchlist candidate. On September 25, he was named one of 62 FBS semifinalists for the William V. Campbell Trophy. He posted his first 100-yard game of the season against Iowa State on September 6, in Kansas State's second game when he tallied 136 receiving yards on 6 receptions. On September 18, he was named one of 30 candidates for the Senior CLASS Award. On September 27, Lockett posted two 50-plus-yard punt returns including a 58-yard touchdown against UTEP. On September 29, Lockett earned his sixth career Big 12 player of the week recognition when he was named Big 12 Special Teams Player of the Week. The following week, he posted 12 receptions for 125 yards and 2 touchdowns against Texas Tech on October 4, and he added 103 yards on 8 receptions against Texas on October 25. On October 30, he earned an $18,000 postgraduate scholarship as one of 16 finalists for the Campbell Trophy. On November 8, he posted 196 yards and a touchdown on 11 receptions against #6 TCU. The effort boosted Lockett's career receiving yardage total to 3,073 yards, surpassing his father's school record total of 3,032 set in 1996. Then, he was named as one of 10 finalists for the Senior CLASS Award and one of 10 semi-finalists for the Biletnikoff Award. On November 20, he was recognized as a first team Academic All-Big 12 honoree. Lockett had 10 receptions for 196 yards and a 43-yard punt return touchdown against West Virginia on November 20 and nine receptions for 119 yards and two touchdowns against Kansas on November 29. In the Kansas–Kansas State rivalry game, Lockett passed his father's school record for receptions and tied his school record for touchdown receptions. In his final regular season game against #5 Baylor, Lockett posted 14 receptions for 158 yards and a touchdown, which gave him 27 career touchdown receptions and broke a tie with his father for the school record. With just a bowl game remaining, Lockett's career total of 3,546 receiving yards ranked sixth in Big 12 Conference history. He added 13 receptions for 164 receiving yards and two touchdowns against UCLA in the 2015 Alamo Bowl. In the game, Lockett had a 41-yard punt return and had a 72-yard punt return touchdown negated due to a holding penalty. He established Alamo Bowl records for receptions (13) and all-purpose yards (249). He was recognized as the game's Sportsmanship MVP.

On December 10, the Big 12 coaches selected Lockett as a repeat All Big 12 Special Teams Player of the Year and as a first team wide receiver. ESPN selected Lockett as the All-Big 12 first team all purpose player while the Associated Press (AP) named him a first team All-Big 12 wide receiver. Lockett was an all-purpose first team selection to the 2014 College Football All-America Team by ESPN, CBS Sports, Scout.com, American Football Coaches Association, and Sports Illustrated. He was a first team punt returner selection by the Football Writers Association of America. He was a second team selection by USA Today at wide receiver, Walter Camp Foundation at return specialist, and AP as an all-purpose player. He earned the school's eleventh consensus All-American recognition. Lockett was selected to play in the 2015 Senior Bowl. He was recognized as the 2014 Big 12 Football Scholar-Athlete of the Year. He was recognized as one of five First team Senior All-Americans from the 2014 Senior CLASS Award candidates. Lockett was recognized with the Jet Award.

Lockett finished his college career with 249 receptions for 3,710 yards and 29 touchdowns as a receiver; 77 kickoff returns for 2,196 yards and 4 touchdowns; 32 punt returns for 488 yards and 2 touchdowns; and 22 rushes for 192 yards as well as 6 career tackles. This totals 6,586 career All-purpose yards. Although the National Collegiate Athletic Association officially recognizes 1.2 punt returns per game as the qualifying minimum threshold, some sources consider 1 punt return per game as the qualifying minimum, and thus Richard Leonard of Florida International is the 2014 punt return average leader by those sources. Lockett's senior season totals led the Big 12 Conference in receiving yards and the nation in punt return average.

== Professional career ==
Pre-draft measurables
Height	Weight	Arm length	Hand span	Wingspan	40-yard dash	10-yard split	20-yard split	20-yard shuttle	Three-cone drill	Vertical jump	Broad jump
5 ft 9 7/8 in (1.77 m)	182 lb (83 kg)	30 in (0.76 m)	8 3/8 in (0.21 m)	5 ft 10 3/4 in (1.80 m)	4.40 s	1.55 s	2.59 s	4.07 s	6.89 s	35.5 in (0.90 m)	10 ft 1 in (3.07 m)
All values from NFL Combine

=== Seattle Seahawks ===
==== 2015 season ====
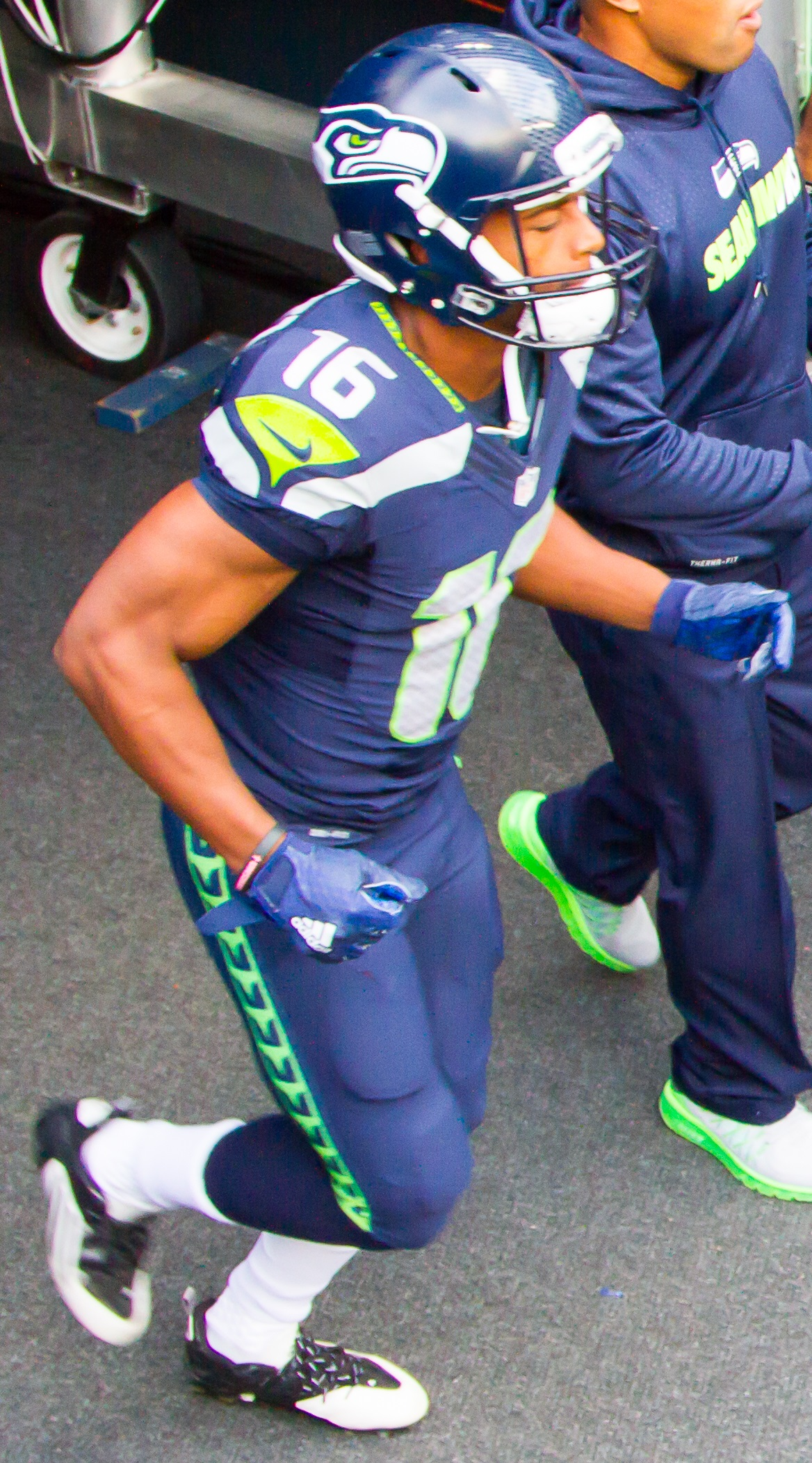
Lockett in the 2015 preseason

The Seattle Seahawks selected Lockett in the third round (69th overall) of the 2015 NFL draft. In order to select Lockett, the Seahawks traded their third-, fourth-, fifth-, and sixth-round picks (95th, 112th, 167th, and 181st overall) to the Washington Redskins in order to move up to the #69 pick in order to select Lockett.

In his first NFL appearance, Lockett returned a 103-yard kickoff for a touchdown against the Denver Broncos in Seattle's preseason opener, marking the first touchdown of the preseason for the team. Four weeks later, in his NFL regular season debut, Lockett returned a 57-yard punt for a touchdown on his first career return, against the St. Louis Rams. He also posted 4 receptions for 34 yards in his debut. The following week, he made his first career regular season start against the Green Bay Packers. Lockett returned a 105-yard kick return in week 3 against the Chicago Bears, setting a new franchise record. His performance for the first three weeks of the season earned him recognition as National Football Conference (NFC) Special Teams Player of the Month for September 2015. Lockett was the first Seahawks rookie to win the award since Joey Galloway. Lockett posted his first career touchdown reception on Thursday Night Football against the San Francisco 49ers on October 22, 2015. On November 22 against the 49ers, Lockett scored 2 receiving touchdowns. On December 6 against the Minnesota Vikings who were 8–3 at the time, Lockett had 7 receptions for 90 yards, both new career highs. One week later, Lockett had his first 100-yard receiving game and his second multi touchdown game with 104 yards, and a two-touchdown winning effort against the Baltimore Ravens. Lockett was named Pepsi NFL Rookie of the Week for his performance against the Ravens. On December 22, 2015, Lockett was selected to be part of the 2016 Pro Bowl. Lockett was one of only three rookies to be selected to the Pro Bowl, along with Rams running back Todd Gurley and Chiefs cornerback Marcus Peters. In the final week of the season on January 3 against the Arizona Cardinals, Lockett set up several scores by the Seahawks with long punt returns and receptions. His 139 punt return yards on 4 punt returns set a Seahawks single-game punt return yardage record and earned Lockett NFC special teams player of the week recognition for week 17. Three punt returns of at least 30 yards in the same game had not been accomplished by an NFL returner in at least 10 seasons. For his performance over the last 5 weeks of the season in which he amassed 759 all-purpose yards, he earned the NFC's Special Teams Player of the Month for December/January, making him the second rookie to win the award twice (Tamarick Vanover, 1995). He joined Gale Sayers as the only rookie to record at least 5 receiving touchdowns, a punt return touchdown, and a kickoff return touchdown. He was the only rookie to be named to the AP All-Pro 1st team. He was also voted along with teammate Thomas Rawls to be in the Pro Football Writers Association NFL All-Rookie Team (2015). Lockett was selected to the team at three positions: wide receiver, punt returner, and kickoff returner. For the 2016 Pro Bowl, Lockett was selected by Team Rice in a fantasy-style draft. At the Pro Bowl, he made one catch for 10 yards and returned one punt for 24 yards.

==== 2016 season ====
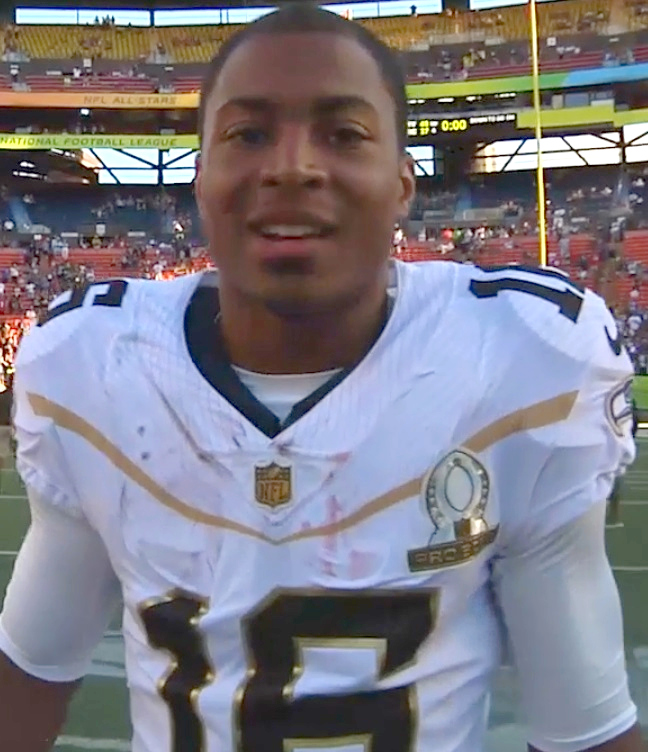
Lockett during the 2016 Pro Bowl

Lockett finished the 2016 season with 41 catches for 597 yards and a touchdown. In addition to his receiving numbers, he had 114 rushing yards including a 75-yard rushing touchdown, which was the longest Seattle run of the season. Lockett suffered a fracture to his right tibia and fibula while making a 28-yard catch in a Week 16 loss to the Cardinals. He had surgery later that night and was placed on injured reserve on December 27, 2016. Following the season, he was named to the 2016 All-Pro Second Team by the Associated Press.

==== 2017 season ====
In Week 11, Lockett returned five kickoffs for 197 yards, including a 57-yarder, earning him NFC Special Teams Player of the Week. Following the season, he was named second-team All-Pro by the Associated Press as a returner. He finished the season with 45 receptions for 555 receiving yards and two receiving touchdowns to go along with 37 kick returns for 949 net return yards and one kick return touchdown.

==== 2018 season ====
On August 29, 2018, Lockett signed a three-year, $31.8 million contract extension with the Seahawks through the 2021 season. In the first three games of the season, Lockett totaled 12 receptions for 196 receiving yards. In addition, he recorded a receiving touchdown in each game. He finished the season as the Seahawks leading receiver with 57 receptions for 965 yards and 10 touchdowns, all career highs. When targeted by quarterback Russell Wilson, Wilson produced a perfect 158.3 passer rating. No other receiver has ever put up a perfect passer rating while being targeted more than 15 times in NFL history. In the Wild Card Round of the 2018–19 NFL playoffs against the Dallas Cowboys, Lockett had four catches for 120 yards in the 24–22 loss. He was ranked 98th by his fellow players on the NFL Top 100 Players of 2019.

==== 2019 season ====
In Week 1 against the Cincinnati Bengals, Lockett only caught one pass in the game; however, it was for 44 yards and a fourth quarter touchdown in the 21–20 win. In Week 3 against the New Orleans Saints, Lockett caught 11 passes for 154 yards and one touchdown in the 33–27 loss. In Week 5 against the rival Los Angeles Rams, Lockett caught four passes for 51 yards and a toe-tapping touchdown catch in the back of the endzone in the 30–29 win. In Week 9 against the Tampa Bay Buccaneers, Lockett caught 13 passes for 152 yards and two touchdowns in the 40–34 overtime win. In Week 15 against the Carolina Panthers, Lockett caught eight passes for 120 yards and a touchdown during the 30–24 win. Overall, Lockett finished the 2019 season with 82 receptions for 1,057 receiving yards and eight receiving touchdowns.

In the Divisional Round of the playoffs against the Packers, Lockett caught nine passes for 136 yards and a touchdown during the 28–23 loss.

Lockett was named to the Pro Bowl on January 17, 2020, as an alternate. He was ranked 65th by his fellow players on the NFL Top 100 Players of 2020.

==== 2020 season ====
During Week 3 against the Cowboys, Lockett finished with 100 receiving yards and three touchdowns as the Seahawks won 38–31. During Sunday Night Football against the Cardinals in Week 7, Lockett finished with a career high of 15 receptions for 200 receiving yards and three touchdowns. It was his first single game with at least 200 receiving yards. However, the Seahawks lost in overtime 34–37. In Week 17 against the 49ers, Lockett recorded 12 catches for 90 yards and two touchdowns during the 26–23 win. Lockett's 12th reception of the game was his 100th of the season. Despite finishing second on the team in yards (behind DK Metcalf), Lockett still totaled 100 catches for 1,054 yards and ten touchdowns. He was ranked 76th by his fellow players on the NFL Top 100 Players of 2021.

==== 2021 season ====
On April 2, 2021, Lockett signed a four-year, $69.2 million contract extension with $37 million guaranteed with the Seahawks.

Lockett started off the season with a 100-yard, two-touchdown game in a victory over the Indianapolis Colts and 178-yard, one-touchdown game against the Tennessee Titans. Over the remainder of the regular season, Lockett had three games going over 100 yards (142, 115, 142). He finished with 73 receptions for 1,175 receiving yards and eight receiving touchdowns.

==== 2022 season ====
In Week 2, against the 49ers, Lockett had nine receptions for 107 yards in the 27–7 loss. In Week 5, against the Saints, he had five receptions for 104 yards and two touchdowns in the 39–32 loss. In Week 13 against the Rams, he had nine receptions for 128 yards in the victory. On December 16, 2022, it was announced that Lockett would undergo surgery to repair a broken bone in his hand. In the 2022 season, Lockett finished with 84 receptions for 1,033 yards and nine touchdowns in 16 games and starts.

==== 2023 season ====
In Week 2, Lockett recorded two touchdowns, including the game-winning score, during a 37–31 overtime victory over the Detroit Lions. He finished the 2023 season with 79 receptions for 894 yards and five touchdowns in 17 games and starts.

==== 2024 season ====
On March 10, 2024, Lockett restructured his contract with the Seahawks, which had two years and $34 million in non-guaranteed money, to a base value of $30 million with $13 million in guaranteed money. "Seattle is home," Lockett said at the time of the restructuring. "Obviously it’s a business and so you've got to kind of look and see what is good for them, you see what's good for yourself, as well. And with everything that I had a chance to be able to do and become, it's really cool that you hear that the staff wants you to be on the team, as well." He finished the 2024 season with 49 receptions for 600 yards and two touchdowns.

On March 5, 2025, Lockett was released by the Seahawks after ten seasons in Seattle.

=== Tennessee Titans ===
On April 23, 2025, Lockett signed with the Tennessee Titans on a one-year, $4 million contract. In seven appearances (one start) for Tennessee, he logged 10 receptions for 70 scoreless yards, plus an offensive fumble recovery touchdown in the Titans' 22–21 comeback victory over the Arizona Cardinals. On October 20, Lockett requested and was granted his release from the Titans.

=== Las Vegas Raiders ===
On October 27, 2025, Lockett signed with the Las Vegas Raiders. He finished the 2025 season with 32 receptions for 291 yards and one touchdown.

== Career statistics ==
=== NFL ===
Legend
	Led the league
**Bold**	Career high

==== Regular season ====
Year	Team	Games		Receiving					Rushing					Kick returns					Punt returns					Fumbles	
Year	Team	GP	GS	Rec	Yds	Avg	Lng	TD	Att	Yds	Avg	Lng	TD	Ret	Yds	Avg	Lng	TD	Ret	Yds	Avg	Lng	TD	Fum	Lost
2015	SEA	16	8	51	664	13.0	49T	6	5	20	4.0	8	0	33	852	25.8	**105T**	**1**	**40**	**379**	**9.5**	**66**	**1**	**2**	1
2016	SEA	15	9	41	597	14.6	57T	1	6	**114**	**19.0**	**75T**	**1**	23	606	**26.3**	46	0	29	243	8.4	62	0	0	0
2017	SEA	16	8	45	555	12.3	**74T**	2	10	58	5.8	22	0	**37**	**949**	25.6	99T	**1**	36	237	6.6	27	0	0	0
2018	SEA	16	14	57	965	**16.9**	52T	**10**	**13**	69	5.3	18	0	19	493	25.9	84	0	25	143	5.7	19	0	**2**	0
2019	SEA	16	16	82	1,057	12.9	44T	8	4	−5	−1.3	3	0	14	279	19.9	33	0	13	66	5.1	20	0	1	0
2020	SEA	16	16	**100**	1,054	10.5	47	**10**	0	0	0.0	0	0	1	9	9.0	9	0	0	0	0.0	0	0	1	0
2021	SEA	16	16	73	**1,175**	16.1	69T	8	2	9	4.5	7	0	0	0	0.0	0	0	1	3	3.0	3	0	0	0
2022	SEA	16	16	84	1,033	12.3	40T	9	0	0	0.0	0	0	0	0	0.0	0	0	1	7	7.0	7	0	**2**	**2**
2023	SEA	17	**17**	79	894	11.3	37	5	0	0	0.0	0	0	0	0	0.0	0	0	0	0	0.0	0	0	0	0
2024	SEA	17	14	49	600	12.2	37	2	0	0	0.0	0	0	0	0	0.0	0	0	0	0	0.0	0	0	0	0
2025	TEN	7	1	10	70	7.0	16	0	0	0	0.0	0	0	0	0	0.0	0	0	0	0	0.0	0	0	0	0
2025	LV	10	1	22	221	10.0	33	1	0	0	0.0	0	0	0	0	0.0	0	0	0	0	0.0	0	0	0	0
Career		178	136	693	8,885	12.8	74T	62	40	265	6.6	75T	1	127	3,188	25.1	105T	2	145	1,078	7.4	66	1	8	3

==== Playoffs ====
Year	Team	Games		Receiving					Rushing					Kick returns					Punt returns					Fumbles	
Year	Team	GP	GS	Rec	Yds	Avg	Lng	TD	Att	Yds	Avg	Lng	TD	Ret	Yds	Avg	Lng	TD	Ret	Yds	Avg	Lng	TD	Fum	Lost
2015	SEA	2	1	4	110	27.5	35	**1**	0	0	0.0	0	0	**4**	**104**	26.0	50	0	**4**	18	4.5	8	0	0	0
2016	SEA	0	0	Did not play due to injury																					
2018	SEA	1	1	4	120	**30.0**	**53**	0	0	0	0.0	0	0	1	52	**52.0**	**52**	0	3	**22**	**7.3**	**12**	0	0	0
2019	SEA	2	**2**	**13**	**198**	15.2	31	**1**	0	0	0.0	0	0	3	60	20.0	27	0	0	0	0.0	0	0	0	0
2020	SEA	1	1	2	43	21.5	24	0	0	0	0.0	0	0	0	0	0.0	0	0	0	0	0.0	0	0	0	0
2022	SEA	1	1	6	39	6.5	10	0	0	0	0.0	0	0	0	0	0.0	0	0	0	0	0.0	0	0	0	0
Career		7	6	29	510	17.6	53	2	0	0	0.0	0	0	8	216	27.0	52	0	7	40	5.7	12	0	0	0

=== College ===
Season	Team	GP	Receiving		
Season	Team	GP	Rec	Yds	TD
2011	Kansas State	9	18	246	3
2012	Kansas State	13	44	687	4
2013	Kansas State	12	81	1,262	11
2014	Kansas State	13	106	1,515	11
Career		47	249	3,710	29

== Career highlights ==
=== Awards and honors ===
NFL

- First-team All-Pro (2015) (Note: Selected as a return specialist)
- 2× Second-team All-Pro (2016, 2017) (Note: Selected as a kick returner)
- Pro Bowl (2015)
- NFL kickoff return yards leader (2017)
- PFWA All-Rookie Team (2015)
- Seattle Seahawks Top 50 players
- 3× Steve Largent Award (2021, 2022, 2024)
- 3× NFL Top 100 — 98th (2019), 65th (2020), 76th (2021)

College

- Jet Award (2014)
- Consensus All-American (2014)
- First-team All-American (2011)
- NCAA average punt return yards leader (2014)
- 2× Big 12 Special Teams Player of the Year (2013, 2014)
- 2× First-team All-Big 12 (2013, 2014)
- 2× Second-team All-Big 12 (2011, 2012)
- Big 12 Offensive Freshman of the Year (2011)
- Kansas State Wildcats Ring of Honor

=== Seahawks records ===
- Most pass receptions, season: 100 (2020)
- Highest catch percentage, season (min. 50 attempts): 81.4 (2018)
- Highest catch percentage, rookie season (min. 50 attempts): 73.9 (2015)
- Longest kick return: 105 yards (Week 3, 2015)
- Most kick return yards, rookie season: 1,231 (2015)
- Most kickoff return yards gained, rookie season: 852 (2015)
- Highest kickoff return yards average, rookie season (min. 25 kickoff returns): 25.8 (2015)
- Most punt return yards gained, game: 139 (2015)

== Personal life ==
Lockett is a Christian and following his beliefs, he chose to abstain from sex until marriage. He married his wife, Lauren Jackson, in July 2023. Their daughter was born in May 2025.

One of Lockett's hobbies is writing poems. He published a book of poems called Reflection in 2019.

Aside from football, Lockett is a real estate agent in Washington and Texas, earning his license in 2022.
