= 2014 All-Big 12 Conference football team =

The 2014 All-Big 12 Conference football team consists of American football players chosen as All-Big 12 Conference players for the 2014 Big 12 Conference football season. The conference recognizes two official All-Big 12 selectors: (1) the Big 12 conference coaches selected separate offensive and defensive units and named first- and second-team players (the "Coaches" team); and (2) a panel of sports writers and broadcasters covering the Big 12 also selected offensive and defensive units and named first- and second-team players (the "Media" team).

== Offensive selections ==
=== Quarterbacks ===
- Trevone Boykin, TCU (Coaches-1; Media-1)
- Bryce Petty, Baylor (Coaches-2; Media-2)
- Jake Waters, Kansas State (Coaches-2)

=== Running backs ===
- Samaje Perine, Oklahoma (Coaches-1; Media-1)
- Shock Linwood, Baylor (Coaches-2; Media-1)
- Malcolm Brown, Texas (Coaches-2)
- Aaron Green, TCU (Coaches-2)
- DeAndré Washington, Texas Tech (Coaches-2)

=== Fullbacks ===
- Glenn Gronkowski, Kansas State (Coaches-1)
- Aaron Ripkowski, Oklahoma (Coaches-2)

=== Centers ===
- B. J. Finney, Kansas State (Coaches-1; Media-1)
- Joey Hunt, TCU (Coaches-2; Media-2)

=== Guards ===
- Mark Glowinski, West Virginia (Coaches-2; Media-1)
- Cody Whitehair, Kansas State (Coaches-2)
- Adam Shead, Oklahoma (Coaches-2)

=== Tackles ===
- Le'Raven Clark, Texas Tech (Coaches-1; Media-1)
- Spencer Drango, Baylor (Coaches-1; Media-1)
- Daryl Williams, Oklahoma (Coaches-1; Media-1)
- Tyrus Thompson, Oklahoma (Coaches-1; Media-2)
- Halapoulivaati Vaitai, TCU (Coaches-2)

=== Tight ends ===
- E. J. Bibbs, Iowa State (Coaches-1; Media-1)
- Jimmay Mundine, Kansas (Coaches-2; Media-2)

=== Receivers ===
- Tyler Lockett, Kansas State (Coaches-1; Media-1)
- Kevin White, West Virginia (Coaches-1; Media-1)
- Corey Coleman, Baylor (Coaches-2; Media-1)
- Sterling Shepard, Oklahoma (Coaches-1; Media-2)
- Curry Sexton, Kansas State (Coaches-2; Media-2)
- Josh Doctson, TCU (Coaches-2)
- John Harris, Texas (Media-2)

== Defensive selections ==
=== Defensive linemen ===
- Andrew Billings, Baylor (Coaches-1; Media-1)
- Malcom Brown, Texas (Coaches-1; Media-1)
- Shawn Oakman, Baylor (Coaches-1; Media-1)
- Emmanuel Ogbah, Oklahoma State (Coaches-1; Media-1)
- Ryan Mueller, Kansas State (Coaches-1; Media-2)
- Chucky Hunter, TCU (Coaches-2; Media-2)
- Jordan Phillips, Oklahoma (Coaches-2; Media-2)
- Cedric Reed, Texas (Coaches-2; Media-2)
- Chuka Ndulue, Oklahoma (Coaches-2)
- Pete Robertson, Texas Tech (Coaches-2)

=== Linebackers ===
- Paul Dawson, TCU (Coaches-1; Media-1)
- Ben Heeney, Kansas (Coaches-1; Media-1)
- Eric Striker, Oklahoma (Coaches-1; Media-1)
- Pete Robertson, Texas Tech (Media-1)
- Bryce Hager, Baylor (Coaches-2; Media-2)
- Jordan Hicks, Texas (Coaches-2; Media-2)
- Jonathan Truman, Kansas State (Coaches-2; Media-2)
- Dominique Alexander, Oklahoma (Media-2)

=== Defensive backs ===
- Chris Hackett, TCU (Coaches-1; Media-1)
- Zack Sanchez, Oklahoma (Coaches-1; Media-1)
- Sam Carter, TCU (Coaches-2; Media-1)
- Randall Evans, Kansas State (Coaches-1)
- Orion Stewart, Baylor (Media-1)
- Quandre Diggs, Texas (Coaches-2; Media-2)
- Karl Joseph, West Virginia (Coaches-1; Media-2)
- JaCorey Shepherd, Kansas (Coaches-1; Media-2)
- Dante Barnett, Kansas State (Coaches-2)
- Danzel McDaniel, Kansas State (Coaches-2)
- Nigel Tribune, Iowa State (Media-2)
- Kevin White, TCU (Coaches-2)

== Special teams ==
=== Kickers ===
- Josh Lambert, West Virginia (Coaches-2; Media-1)
- Jaden Oberkrom, TCU (Coaches-1; Media-2)

=== Punters ===
- Trevor Pardula, Kansas (Coaches-1; Media-1)
- Spencer Roth, Baylor (Coaches-2; Media-2)

=== All-purpose / Return specialists ===
- Tyler Lockett, Kansas State (Coaches-1; Media-2)
- Tyreek Hill, Oklahoma State (Coaches-2; Media-1)

== Key ==
Bold = selected as a first-team player by both the coaches and media panel

Coaches = selected by Big 12 Conference coaches

Media = selected by a media panel

== See also ==
- 2014 College Football All-America Team
