= Dante Barnett =

American football player (born 1993)

No. 22
- Position: Safety

Personal information
- Born: June 14, 1993 (age 33); Tulsa, Oklahoma, U.S.
- Listed height: 6 ft 0 in (1.83 m)
- Listed weight: 192 lb (87 kg)

Career information
- High school: Tulsa (OK) Washington
- College: Kansas State
- NFL draft: 2017: undrafted

Career history

Playing
- Denver Broncos (2017)*
- * Offseason or practice squad member only

Coaching
- Seguin HS (TX) (2018–2021) Pass game coordinator, wide receivers coach, defensive backs coach, junior varsity head coach, & junior varsity offensive coordinator; UTEP (2022–2023) Safeties coach

Awards and highlights
- Second-team All-Big 12 (2014)
- Stats at Pro Football Reference

Dante Barnett (born June 14, 1993) is an American former football safety. He played college football at Kansas State.

== College career ==
Barnett was awarded the Defensive Most Valuable Player in the 2013 Buffalo Wild Wings Bowl after his performance in Kansas State's 31–14 victory over Michigan. In the game, he recorded a team-high eight tackles and an interception with a 51-yard return to the Michigan seven-yard line.

== Professional career ==
Pre-draft measurables
Height	Weight	Arm length	Hand span	Wingspan	20-yard shuttle	Three-cone drill
5 ft 11 7/8 in (1.83 m)	192 lb (87 kg)	29 1/4 in (0.74 m)	8 3/4 in (0.22 m)	6 ft 0 3/8 in (1.84 m)	4.21 s	7.01 s
All values from Pro Day

Barnett signed with Denver Broncos as an undrafted free agent on May 13, 2017. He was waived on September 2, 2017.
