= 2013 Michigan Wolverines football team =

American college football season

2013 Michigan Wolverines football

Buffalo Wild Wings Bowl, L 14–31 vs. Kansas State
- Conference: Big Ten Conference
- Legends Division
- Record: 7–6 (3–5 Big Ten)
- Head coach: Brady Hoke (3rd season)
- Offensive coordinator: Al Borges (3rd season)
- Offensive scheme: Pro-style
- Defensive coordinator: Greg Mattison (5th season)
- Base defense: 4–3
- MVP: Jeremy Gallon
- Captains: Taylor Lewan; Courtney Avery; Cameron Gordon; Jake Ryan
- Home stadium: Michigan Stadium

2013 Big Ten Conference football standings
	Conf.			Overall
Team	W		L	W		L
Legends Division
No. 3 Michigan State x$	8	–	0	13	–	1
Iowa	5	–	3	8	–	5
Nebraska	5	–	3	9	–	4
Minnesota	4	–	4	8	–	5
Michigan	3	–	5	7	–	6
Northwestern	1	–	7	5	–	7
Leaders Division
No. 12 Ohio State x%	8	–	0	12	–	2
No. 22 Wisconsin	6	–	2	9	–	4
Penn State*	4	–	4	7	–	5
Indiana	3	–	5	5	–	7
Illinois	1	–	7	4	–	8
Purdue	0	–	8	1	–	11
Championship: Michigan State 34, Ohio State 24
$ – BCS representative as conference champion; % – BCS at-large representative; x – Division champion/co-champions; Penn State ineligible for conference championship game and post-season bowl games due to NCAA sanctions; Rankings from AP Poll

The 2013 Michigan Wolverines football team, also known as Team 134 in reference to the 134th year of the Michigan football program, represented the University of Michigan in the sport of college football during the 2013 NCAA Division I FBS football season. The Wolverines played in the Legends Division of the Big Ten Conference and played their home games at Michigan Stadium in Ann Arbor, Michigan. The team was led by head coach Brady Hoke, who was in his third season.

Michigan began the year with five consecutive victories, including a 41–30 victory over rival Notre Dame in just the second night game in Michigan Stadium history. The game set the all-time record for largest crowd attending an American football game at 115,109. However, in their sixth game, the Wolverines were upset on the road by unranked Penn State in four overtimes. Michigan went on to lose five of their final six games, eventually dropping out of the AP poll, ending with a loss to Kansas State in the 2013 Buffalo Wild Wings Bowl. The season ended with a record of 7–6 overall, 3–5 in conference play.

The Wolverines were led on offense by quarterback Devin Gardner, who led the team with 2,960 passing yards and 32 total touchdowns (22 passing and 11 rushing). Wide receiver Jeremy Gallon finished second in the Big Ten with 1,373 receiving yards.

== Preseason ==
The 2012 team compiled an 8–5 record under second-year head coach Brady Hoke and faced South Carolina in the Outback Bowl, losing 33–28 on a last-minute touchdown. Michigan lost four games to teams that were ranked in the top ten of the AP Poll.

On March 20, the team announced that returning starting linebacker Jake Ryan suffered a torn ACL and was listed as out indefinitely. On April 1, the team announced that backup quarterback Russell Bellomy had also suffered a torn ACL and would be out indefinitely. On May 7, the team announced that punter Will Hagerup had been reinstated to the team following a suspension for a violation of team rules, but would sit out the season. On August 21, the team announced that wide receiver Amara Darboh would miss the season with a foot injury.

Michigan returns 13 out of 22 starters — six on offense and seven on defense. Michigan will be forced to replace captains quarterback Denard Robinson and safety Jordan Kovacs, as well as starters defensive end Craig Roh, linebacker Kenny Demens, defensive tackle Will Campbell, cornerback J.T. Floyd, center Elliott Mealer, offensive guards Patrick Omameh and Ricky Barnum, tight end Mike Kwiatkowski, and wide receiver Roy Roundtree. Back-up running back Vincent Smith also departed due to graduation. Taylor Lewan, however, decided to return for his senior season.

== Recruiting ==
=== Recruits ===
Michigan's recruiting class was ranked No. 2 by Scout, No. 5 by Rivals, and No. 6 by ESPN. The program received 27 letters of intent on National Signing Day, February 6, 2013.

College recruiting information
Name	Hometown	School	Height	Weight	40^{‡}	Commit date
Kyle Bosch; OL	Wheaton, Illinois	St. Francis H.S.	6 ft 5 in (1.96 m)	282.5 lb (128.1 kg)	–	Feb 18, 2012
Kyle Bosch; OL	Recruit ratings: Scout: Rivals: (83)					
Jake Butt; TE	Pickerington, Ohio	Pickerington H.S. North	6 ft 6 in (1.98 m)	227.5 lb (103.2 kg)	–	Feb 19, 2012
Jake Butt; TE	Recruit ratings: Scout: Rivals: (83)					
Taco Charlton; DE	Pickerington, Ohio	Pickerington H.S. Central	6 ft 6 in (1.98 m)	237.5 lb (107.7 kg)	4.8	Feb 18, 2012
Taco Charlton; DE	Recruit ratings: Scout: Rivals: (84)					
David Dawson; OL	Detroit, Michigan	Cass Tech H.S.	6 ft 4 in (1.93 m)	290 lb (130 kg)	5.5	Dec 15, 2012
David Dawson; OL	Recruit ratings: Scout: Rivals: (84)					
Reon Dawson; DB	Trotwood, Ohio	Trotwood-Madison H.S.	6 ft 2 in (1.88 m)	175 lb (79 kg)	4.4	Jan 14, 2013
Reon Dawson; DB	Recruit ratings: Scout: Rivals: (77)					
Ross Douglas; DB	Avon, Ohio	Avon H.S.	5 ft 10.5 in (1.79 m)	189 lb (86 kg)	4.41	Jul 24, 2012
Ross Douglas; DB	Recruit ratings: Scout: Rivals: (80)					
Jaron Dukes; WR	Columbus, Ohio	Marion Franklin H.S.	6 ft 4 in (1.93 m)	198.5 lb (90.0 kg)	4.6	Feb 22, 2012
Jaron Dukes; WR	Recruit ratings: Scout: Rivals: (83)					
Chris Fox; OL	Parker, Colorado	Ponderosa H.S.	6 ft 5.5 in (1.97 m)	291 lb (132 kg)	–	Feb 18, 2012
Chris Fox; OL	Recruit ratings: Scout: Rivals: (83)					
Ben Gedeon; LB	Hudson, Ohio	Hudson H.S.	6 ft 2.5 in (1.89 m)	207.5 lb (94.1 kg)	4.6	Apr 10, 2012
Ben Gedeon; LB	Recruit ratings: Scout: Rivals: (82)					
Derrick Green; RB	Richmond, Virginia	Hermitage H.S.	5 ft 11.5 in (1.82 m)	220 lb (100 kg)	4.4	Jan 26, 2013
Derrick Green; RB	Recruit ratings: Scout: Rivals: (87)					
Delano Hill; S	Detroit, Michigan	Cass Tech H.S.	6 ft 0.5 in (1.84 m)	191.5 lb (86.9 kg)	–	Dec 15, 2012
Delano Hill; S	Recruit ratings: Scout: Rivals: (79)					
Khalid Hill; TE	Detroit, Michigan	Crockett H.S.	6 ft 2.5 in (1.89 m)	232.5 lb (105.5 kg)	5.0	Feb 6, 2012
Khalid Hill; TE	Recruit ratings: Scout: Rivals: (79)					
Maurice Hurst Jr. DT	Westwood, Massachusetts	Xaverian	6 ft 2 in (1.88 m)	302.5 lb (137.2 kg)	–	Jun 2, 2012
Maurice Hurst Jr. DT	Recruit ratings: Scout: Rivals: (77)					
Da'Mario Jones; WR	Westland, Michigan	John Glenn H.S.	6 ft 2 in (1.88 m)	185 lb (84 kg)	4.4	Oct 31, 2012
Da'Mario Jones; WR	Recruit ratings: Scout: Rivals: (78)					
Patrick Kugler; OL	Wexford, Pennsylvania	North Allegheny H.S.	6 ft 4.5 in (1.94 m)	275 lb (125 kg)	5.1	Feb 25, 2012
Patrick Kugler; OL	Recruit ratings: Scout: Rivals: (84)					
Jourdan Lewis; CB	Detroit, Michigan	Cass Tech H.S.	5 ft 9.5 in (1.77 m)	159.5 lb (72.3 kg)	4.7	Feb 18, 2012
Jourdan Lewis; CB	Recruit ratings: Scout: Rivals: (84)					
Mike McCray; LB	Trotwood, Ohio	Trotwood-Madison H.S.	6 ft 3 in (1.91 m)	225 lb (102 kg)	4.6	Mar 6, 2012
Mike McCray; LB	Recruit ratings: Scout: Rivals: (84)					
Shane Morris; QB	Warren, Michigan	De La Salle H.S.	6 ft 2.25 in (1.89 m)	192.5 lb (87.3 kg)	4.6	May 10, 2011
Shane Morris; QB	Recruit ratings: Scout: Rivals: (84)					
Henry Poggi; DT	Baltimore, Maryland	Gilman School	6 ft 4 in (1.93 m)	260 lb (120 kg)	4.7	Jun 4, 2012
Henry Poggi; DT	Recruit ratings: Scout: Rivals: (82)					
Dan Samuelson; OL	Plymouth, Indiana	Plymouth H.S.	6 ft 5 in (1.96 m)	277.5 lb (125.9 kg)	5.3	Jan 12, 2013
Dan Samuelson; OL	Recruit ratings: Scout: Rivals: (75)					
Wyatt Shallman; RB	Novi, Michigan	Detroit Catholic Central H.S.	6 ft 3 in (1.91 m)	245 lb (111 kg)	–	Feb 18, 2012
Wyatt Shallman; RB	Recruit ratings: Scout: Rivals: (79)					
De'Veon Smith; RB	Warren, Ohio	Howland H.S.	5 ft 11 in (1.80 m)	202.5 lb (91.9 kg)	–	Mar 17, 2012
De'Veon Smith; RB	Recruit ratings: Scout: Rivals: (81)					
Channing Stribling; DB	Matthews, North Carolina	Butler H.S.	6 ft 2 in (1.88 m)	170.5 lb (77.3 kg)	4.53	Jun 21, 2012
Channing Stribling; DB	Recruit ratings: Scout: Rivals: (77)					
Scott Sypniewski; LS	Ottawa, Illinois	Marquette H.S.	6 ft 1 in (1.85 m)	230 lb (100 kg)	–	Jun 6, 2012
Scott Sypniewski; LS	Recruit ratings: Scout: Rivals: (67)					
Dymonte Thomas; DB	Alliance, Ohio	Marlington H.S.	6 ft 1 in (1.85 m)	177.5 lb (80.5 kg)	4.515	Sep 11, 2011
Dymonte Thomas; DB	Recruit ratings: Scout: Rivals: (84)					
Logan Tuley-Tillman; OL	Peoria, Illinois	Manual H.S.	6 ft 7 in (2.01 m)	323 lb (147 kg)	–	Feb 19, 2012
Logan Tuley-Tillman; OL	Recruit ratings: Scout: Rivals: (84)					
Csont'e York; WR	Harper Woods, Michigan	Chandler Park Academy	6 ft 2.5 in (1.89 m)	182.5 lb (82.8 kg)	–	Jun 10, 2012
Csont'e York; WR	Recruit ratings: Scout: Rivals: (76)					
Overall recruit ranking: Scout: 2 Rivals: 5 ESPN: 6
‡ Refers to 40-yard dash; Note: In many cases, Scout, Rivals, 247Sports, On3, and ESPN may conflict in their listings of height, weight and 40 time.; In these cases, the average was taken. ESPN grades are on a 100-point scale.; Sources: "2013 Michigan Football Commitment List". Rivals.; "2013 Michigan Football Commits". Scout.; "ESPN". ESPN.; "Scout.com Team Recruiting Rankings". Scout.; "2013 Team Ranking". Rivals.com.

== Schedule ==
Date	Time	Opponent	Rank	Site	TV	Result	Attendance	Source
August 31	3:30 p.m.	Central Michigan*	No. 17	Michigan Stadium; Ann Arbor, MI	BTN	W 59–9	112,618	
September 7	8:00 p.m.	No. 14 Notre Dame*	No. 17	Michigan Stadium; Ann Arbor, MI (rivalry, College GameDay)	ESPN	W 41–30	115,109‡	
September 14	12:00 p.m.	Akron*	No. 11	Michigan Stadium; Ann Arbor, MI	BTN	W 28–24	107,120	
September 21	8:00 p.m.	at UConn*	No. 15	Rentschler Field; East Hartford, CT	ABC	W 24–21	42,704	
October 5	3:30 p.m.	Minnesota^{†}	No. 19	Michigan Stadium; Ann Arbor, MI (Little Brown Jug)	ABC, ESPN2	W 42–13	111,079	
October 12	5:00 p.m.	at Penn State	No. 18	Beaver Stadium; State College, PA (rivalry)	ESPN	L 40–43 ^{4OT}	107,884	
October 19	3:30 p.m.	Indiana	No. 24	Michigan Stadium; Ann Arbor, MI	BTN	W 63–47	109,503	
November 2	3:30 p.m.	at No. 24 Michigan State	No. 23	Spartan Stadium; East Lansing, MI (rivalry)	ABC	L 6–29	76,308	
November 9	3:30 p.m.	Nebraska		Michigan Stadium; Ann Arbor, MI	ABC	L 13–17	112,204	
November 16	3:30 p.m.	at Northwestern		Ryan Field; Evanston, IL (rivalry)	BTN	W 27–19 ^{3OT}	47,330	
November 23	12:00 p.m.	at Iowa		Kinnick Stadium; Iowa City, IA	BTN	L 21–24	65,708	
November 30	12:00 p.m.	No. 3 Ohio State		Michigan Stadium; Ann Arbor, MI (The Game)	ABC	L 41–42	113,511	
December 28	10:15 p.m.	vs. Kansas State*		Sun Devil Stadium; Tempe, AZ (Buffalo Wild Wings Bowl)	ESPN	L 14–31	53,284	
*Non-conference game; ^{†}Homecoming; Rankings from AP Poll released prior to the game; All times are in Eastern time

- ‡ New Michigan Stadium attendance record, former NCAA attendance record (September 7, 2013 – September 10, 2016)

== Rankings ==
Michigan began the season ranked No. 17 in both the AP and Coaches' Polls, and remained there following its week one victory over Central Michigan. Michigan rose to No. 11 in the AP Poll and No. 12 in the Coaches' Poll after its victory over Notre Dame, but fell to No. 15 in the AP Poll and No. 14 in the Coaches' Poll following its narrow victory over Akron, and then fell again to No. 18 in the AP Poll and No. 17 in the Coaches' Poll following its narrow victory over Connecticut.

Ranking movements Legend: ██ Increase in ranking ██ Decrease in ranking — = Not ranked RV = Received votes
	Week																
Poll	Pre	1	2	3	4	5	6	7	8	9	10	11	12	13	14	15	Final
AP	17	17	11	15	18	19	18	RV	24	23	RV	—	—	—	—	—	—
Coaches	17	17	12	14	17	17	16	24	23	21	RV	—	RV	—	—	—	—
Harris	Not released							24	22	21	RV	—	RV	—	—	—	Not released
BCS	Not released								22	21	—	—	—	—	—	—	Not released

*Source: ESPN.com: 2013 NCAA Football Rankings

== Game summaries ==
=== Vs. Central Michigan ===
Central Michigan vs. Michigan

Team	1	2	3	4	Total
Chippewas	3	3	0	3	9
• #17 Wolverines	14	21	21	3	59

- Date: August 31
- Location: Michigan Stadium
  Ann Arbor, Michigan
- Game start: 3:42 p.m. EDT
- Elapsed time: 3:10
- Game attendance: 112,618
- Game weather: 82 °F (28 °C), Cloudy, W 12 mph (19 km/h)
- Referee: Mike Cannon
- TV announcers (BTN): Matt Devlin, Glen Mason & Lisa Byington

Scoring summary
1	12:56	MICH	Joe Reynolds 30-yard blocked punt return (Brendan Gibbons kick)	MICH 7–0
1	9:39	CMU	Ron Coluzzi 23-yard field goal	MICH 7–3
1	7:26	MICH	Devin Gardner 22-yard run (Brendan Gibbons kick)	MICH 14–3
2	14:56	MICH	Fitzgerald Toussaint 1-yard run (Brendan Gibbons kick)	MICH 21–3
2	8:13	CMU	Ron Coluzzi 27-yard field goal	MICH 21–6
2	2:04	MICH	Jeremy Gallon 16-yard pass from Devin Gardner (Brendan Gibbons kick)	MICH 28–6
2	0:28	MICH	Devin Gardner 4-yard run (Brendan Gibbons kick)	MICH 35–6
3	0:19	MICH	Fitzgerald Toussaint 2-yard run (Brendan Gibbons kick)	MICH 42–6
3	10:25	MICH	Derrick Green 1-yard run (Brendan Gibbons kick)	MICH 49–6
3	10:25	MICH	Thomas Rawls 5-yard run (Brendan Gibbons kick)	MICH 56–6
3	2:58	CMU	Ron Coluzzi 33-yard field goal (Brendan Gibbons kick)	MICH 56–9
4	8:24	MICH	Brendan Gibbons 30-yard field goal	MICH 59–9

To open the season, Michigan faced the Central Michigan Chippewas. This was the first meeting since 2006, when the game incurred a lightning delay, which was Michigan Stadium's first ever weather delay. Michigan won that game 41–17. Starting safety Thomas Gordon was suspended for the game for a violation of team rules.

Michigan dominated the game, winning 59–9. Michigan opened the scoring in the first quarter when Joe Reynolds returned a blocked punt 30 yards for a touchdown, but Central Michigan responded with a 23-yard field goal from Ron Coluzzi. Michigan ended the scoring in the first quarter with a Devin Gardner 22-yard touchdown run, making the score 14–3. Michigan outscored Central Michigan 21–3 in the second quarter. Fitzgerald Toussaint rushed one-yard for a touchdown before Coluzzi added another field goal for Central Michigan, this time from a distance of 27 yards. Michigan ended the scoring in the first half with a 21-yard touchdown pass from Gardner to Jeremy Gallon and a four-yard touchdown run from Gardner, making the score 35–6 at halftime. Michigan outscored Central Michigan 21–0 in the third quarter via a two-yard touchdown run from Toussaint, a one-yard run from Derrick Green, and a five-yard touchdown run from Thomas Rawls, which made the score 56–6. The teams traded field goals in the fourth quarter, a 33-yard one from Coluzzi for Central Michigan and a 30-yard one from Brendan Gibbons for Michigan to end the scoring.

Michigan's 59 points were the most scored by a Michigan football team in its season opener since 1905—when Michigan defeated Ohio Wesleyan 65–0—and were also the most points scored against a team since Michigan defeated Massachusetts 63–13 in 2012. The blocked punt returned for a touchdown in the first quarter was Michigan's first blocked punt returned for a touchdown since 2009, when Brandon Graham returned one against Delaware State. Michigan's defense recorded four sacks, which matched the previous season's high against Ohio State. 27 freshman made their debuts for Michigan during the game. Backup running back Drake Johnson suffered a torn ACL during the game and will miss the remainder of the season.

=== Vs. Notre Dame ===
Notre Dame at Michigan
(Michigan – Notre Dame rivalry game)

Team	1	2	3	4	Total
#14 Fighting Irish	7	6	7	10	30
• #17 Wolverines	10	17	7	7	41

- Date: September 7
- Location: Michigan Stadium
  Ann Arbor, Michigan
- Game start: 8:12 p.m. EDT
- Elapsed time: 3:30
- Game attendance: 115,109
- Game weather: 77 °F (25 °C), Cloudy, NW 12 mph (19 km/h)
- Referee: David Epperley
- TV announcers (ESPN): Brent Musburger, Kirk Herbstreit & Heather Cox

Scoring summary
1	9:00	MICH	Brendan Gibbons 44-yard field goal	MICH 3–0
1	5:35	MICH	Jeremy Gallon 61-yard pass from Devin Gardner (Brendan Gibbons kick)	MICH 10–0
1	2:01	ND	TJ Jones 4-yard pass from Tommy Rees (Kyle Brindza kick)	MICH 10–7
2	14:05	ND	Kyle Brindza 44-yard field goal	TIE 10–10
2	8:43	MICH	Devin Gardner 2-yard run (Brendan Gibbons kick)	MICH 17–10
2	5:49	ND	Kyle Brindza 24-yard field goal	MICH 17–13
2	1:56	MICH	Brendan Gibbons 38-yard field goal	MICH 20–13
2	1:09	MICH	Jeremy Gallon 12-yard pass from Devin Gardner (Brendan Gibbons kick)	MICH 27–13
3	4:55	ND	Troy Niklas 20-yard pass from Tommy Rees	MICH 27–20
3	1:54	MICH	Jeremy Gallon 13-yard pass from Devin Gardner (Brendan Gibbons kick)	MICH 34–20
4	12:06	ND	Stephon Tuitt 0-yard interception return (Kyle Brindza kick)	MICH 34–27
4	9:15	ND	Kyle Brindza 40-yard field goal	MICH 34–30
4	4:18	MICH	Drew Dileo 4-yard pass from Devin Gardner (Brendan Gibbons kick)	MICH 41–30

Following its game against Central, Michigan hosted the Notre Dame Fighting Irish. Notre Dame won the previous meeting 13–6. Billed as "Under the Lights II", this was the second night game in Michigan Stadium's history; the previous game also featured Notre Dame. Tom Harmon was honored as a Michigan Football Legend, and his #98 jersey was unretired and given to quarterback Devin Gardner.

Michigan won the game, 41–30. Michigan opened the scoring in the first quarter with a 44-yard field goal from Brendan Gibbons and added a 61-yard touchdown pass from Devin Gardner to Jeremy Gallon to expand its lead to 10–0. Notre Dame answered with a seven-yard touchdown pass from Tommy Rees to T. J. Jones, making the score at the end of the first quarter 10–7 in favor of Michigan. Notre Dame tied the game in the second quarter with a 44-yard field goal from Kyle Brindza, but Michinga regained the via a two-yard touchdown run from Devin Gardner. After Notre Dame cut Michigan's lead to four via a 24-yard field goal from Brindza, Michigan scored ten unanswered points to end the half—a Gibbons 38-yard field goal and a 12-yard touchdown pass from Gardner to Gallon—making the score 27–13 at halftime. Notre Dame reduced Michigan's lead to seven points in the third quarter on a 20-yard touchdown pass from Rees to Troy Niklas, but Michigan regained its 14-point advantage with a 13-yard touchdown pass from Gardner to Gallon. Notre Dame scored the first ten points of the fourth quarter via a Stephon Tuitt interception in the Michigan endzone for a touchdown and a Brindza 40-yard field goal, making the score 34–30 in favor of Michigan. Michigan, however, would score the final points of the game on a four-yard touchdown pass from Gardner to Drew Dileo.

The game's announced attendance was 115,109, making it the largest crowd ever to watch an American football game (college or NFL). Gardner accounted for 376 yards of Michigan's offense, the ninth highest single-game performance by a Michigan player. The only two Michigan players to contribute more total yards in a single game are Denard Robinson and John Navarre. Wide receiver Jeremy Gallon caught eight passes for 184 yards and three touchdowns, while rushing for 14 yards. Gallon's 184 receiving yards against Notre Dame is tied for the sixth highest single-game performance in Michigan history. On defense, cornerback Blake Countess had two interceptions for Michigan, the first two of his career, and became the first Michigan player to have two interceptions in a game since James Rogers against Purdue in 2010. Raymon Taylor recorded a career-high eleven tackles in the game. The win was Michigan's 400th victory at Michigan Stadium and improved its record against Notre Dame to 24–16–1. Gibbons' first-quarter field goal—his 15th straight made field goal attempt—broke the Michigan record for most consecutive field goals made. Remy Hamilton previously held the record. Stephen M. Ross, who donated $200 million to the University of Michigan earlier in the week, was named an honorary captain for the game. In recognition of his performance in the game, Gallon was named the Big Ten's Offensive Player of the Week. Gardner was named Davey O'Brien Quarterback of the Week and one of eight Manning Award Stars of the Week for his 5 touchdown performance, which included a record-tying 4 passing touchdowns.

References to chickens were a widely reported side story to the game. After Notre Dame announced one year earlier that it would terminate the rivalry after the 2014 season, Michigan head coach Brady Hoke said Notre Dame was "chickening out" of the rivalry. When ESPN commentator Lee Corso made his pick for the game during the College GameDay show (which was in Ann Arbor for the game), he brought out several live chickens while picking Notre Dame to win the game, and fans in the background carried signs with poultry references, including "Cluck of the Irish." At the end Michigan's 41–30 victory, in what Chantel Jennings of ESPN.com called the "Dig of the Day", the speakers at Michigan Stadium loudly played the "Chicken Dance" as Michigan fans "danced in the stands."

=== Vs. Akron ===
Akron at Michigan

Team	1	2	3	4	Total
Zips	3	0	7	14	24
• #11 Wolverines	7	0	14	7	28

- Date: September 14
- Location: Michigan Stadium
  Ann Arbor, Michigan
- Game start: 12:01 p.m. EDT
- Elapsed time: 3:19
- Game attendance: 107,120
- Game weather: 65 °F (18 °C), Sunny, NW 12 mph (19 km/h)
- Referee: Dave Witvoet
- TV announcers (BTN): Kevin Kugler, Chuck Long & Lisa Byington

Scoring summary
1	10:29	MICH	Devin Funchess 48-yard pass from Devin Gardner (Brendan Gibbons kick)	MICH 7–0
1	2:59	AKR	Robert Stein 45-yard field goal	MICH 7–3
3	9:56	AKR	Zach D'Oriazo 28-yard pass from Kyle Pohl (Robert Stein kick)	AKR 10–7
3	8:13	MICH	Devin Gardner 36-yard run (Brendan Gibbons kick)	MICH 14–10
3	3:23	MICH	Jehu Chesson 33-yard pass from Devin Gardner (Brendan Gibbons kick)	MICH 21–10
4	14:46	AKR	Justin March 27-yard interception return (Robert Stein kick)	MICH 21–17
4	4:10	AKR	Tyrell Goodman 1-yard pass from Kyle Pohl (Robert Stein kick)	AKR 24–21
4	2:49	MICH	Fitzgerald Toussaint 2-yard run (Brendan Gibbons kick)	MICH 28–24

Following the game against Notre Dame, Michigan hosted the Akron Zips. This was the first meeting between the two teams.

Michigan avoided a massive upset with a goal line stand at the end of the game, ensuring a 28–24 victory. Michigan opened the scoring in the first quarter with a 48-yard touchdown pass from Devin Gardner to Devin Funchess, but Akron responded with a 45-yard field goal from Robert Stein. Following a scoreless second quarter, Michigan led 7–3 at halftime. Akron opened the scoring in the third quarter with a 28-yard touchdown from Kyle Pohl to Zach D'Orazio, but Michigan responded with two touchdowns of its own—a Gardner 36-yard run and a 33-yard pass from Gardner to Jehu Chesson—giving Michigan a 21–10 lead. Akron responded with 14 points of its own—a Justin March 27-yard interception return for a touchdown and a one-yard touchdown pass from Pohl to Tyrell Goodman—to take a 24–21 lead. Michigan regained the lead and ended the scoring with a two-yard touchdown run from Fitzgerald Toussaint.

Gardner recorded 103 rushing yards, which set a new career high. Brendan Gibbons missed a 45-yard field goal in the second quarter, which ended his streak of 16 consecutive made field goals. Blake Countess recorded his second straight game with an interception, while Jarrod Wilson recorded his first career interception. Akron became the 145th school to play Michigan in a football game, with Michigan's record improving to 116–25–4 in games when facing a new opponent.

=== At UConn ===
Michigan at UConn

Team	1	2	3	4	Total
• #15 Wolverines	7	0	7	10	24
Huskies	0	14	7	0	21

- Date: September 21
- Location: Rentschler Field
  East Hartford, Connecticut
- Game start: 8:14 p.m. EDT
- Elapsed time: 3:16
- Game attendance: 42,704
- Game weather: 71 °F (22 °C), Chance of rain, S 8 mph (13 km/h)
- Referee: Ed Ardito
- TV announcers (ABC): Sean McDonough, Chris Spielman & Shannon Spake

Scoring summary
1	1:56	MICH	Devin Gardner 17-yard run (Brendan Gibbons kick)	MICH 7–0
2	3:54	UCONN	Spencer Parker 11-yard pass from Chandler Whitmer (Chad Christen kick)	Tie 7–7
2	1:47	UCONN	Lyle McCombs 7-yard pass from Chandler Whitmer (Chad Christen kick)	UCONN 14–7
3	13:39	UCONN	Ty-Meer Brown 34-yard fumble return (Chad Christen kick)	UCONN 21–7
3	5:37	MICH	Fitzgerald Toussaint 35-yard run (Brendan Gibbons kick)	UCONN 21–14
4	9:49	MICH	Fitzgerald Toussaint 12-yard run (Brendan Gibbons kick)	Tie 21–21
4	4:36	MICH	Brendan Gibbons 21-yard field goal	MICH 24–21

Following its near-upset from Akron, Michigan traveled to East Hartford to face the Connecticut (UConn) Huskies. In the previous meeting in 2010—the rededication of Michigan Stadium—Michigan defeated Connecticut 30–10.

Michigan won its second close game in two weeks, scoring 17 unanswered points to defeat UConn 24–21 after falling behind 21–7 in the third quarter. Michigan scored the only points of the first quarter via a Devin Gardner 17-yard touchdown. UConn responded with 14 unanswered points in the second quarter to take a 14–7 lead at halftime: an 11-yard touchdown pass from Chandler Whitmer to Spencer Parker and a seven-yard touchdown pass from Whitmer to Lyle McCombs. UConn opened the scoring in the third quarter when Ty-Meer Brown returned a Gardner fumble 34 yards for a touchdown, making the score 21–7 UConn. Michigan responded by scoring the final 17 points, a 35-yard touchdown run from Fitzgerald Toussaint in the third quarter, a 12-yard touchdown run from Toussaint in the fourth quarter, and a 21-yard field goal from Brendan Gibbons, which also occurred in the fourth quarter.

The attendance of 42,704 was the largest crowd in the history of Rentschler Field. Toussaint carried the ball 24 times for a total of 120 rushing yards, his first effort over 100 yards since the game against Ohio State in 2011. Frank Clark recorded two sacks in the game, his first multi-sack game of his career. Desmond Morgan recorded his first career interception, while Chris Wormley and Raymon Taylor both recorded their first career sacks. Michigan's defense only allowed 206 yards of total offense and held UConn to one successful third down conversion out of eleven attempts.

=== Vs. Minnesota ===
Minnesota at Michigan
(Homecoming game/Little Brown Jug)

Team	1	2	3	4	Total
Golden Gophers	7	0	3	3	13
• #19 Wolverines	7	7	14	14	42

- Date: October 5
- Location: Michigan Stadium
  Ann Arbor, Michigan
- Game start: 3:36 EDT
- Elapsed time: 2:56
- Game attendance: 111,079
- Game weather: 75 °F (24 °C), Cloudy, SE 12 mph (19 km/h)
- Referee: Alex Kemp
- TV announcers (ABC/ESPN2): Mike Patrick, Ed Cunningham & Jeannine Edwards

Scoring summary
1	10:36	MICH	Fitzgerald Toussaint 8-yard run (Brendan Gibbons kick)	MICH 7–0
1	:52	MINN	Maxx Williams 7-yard pass from Mitch Leidner (Chris Hawthorne kick)	TIE 7–7
2	1:25	MICH	Devin Funchess 24-yard pass from Devin Gardner (Brendan Gibbons kick)	MICH 14–7
3	10:08	MICH	Derrick Green 2-yard run (Brendan Gibbons kick)	MICH 21–7
3	4:26	MINN	Chris Hawthorne 44-yard field goal	MICH 21–10
3	:11	MICH	Fitzgerald Toussaint 12-yard run (Brendan Gibbons kick)	MICH 28–10
4	10:07	MINN	Chris Hawthorne 27-yard field goal	MICH 28–13
4	2:36	MICH	Devin Gardner 2-yard run (Brendan Gibbons kick)	MICH 35–13
4	1:19	MICH	Blake Countess 72-yard interception return (Brendan Gibbons kick)	MICH 42–13

After its trip to Connecticut, Michigan faced the Minnesota Golden Gophers. In the previous meeting, Michigan dominated Minnesota and won by a score of 35–13.

Michigan again dominated Minnesota, winning 42–13. The teams traded touchdowns in the first quarter, with Michigan scoring on an eight-yard touchdown run from Fitzgerald Toussaint and Minnesota responding with a seven-yard touchdown pass from Mitch Leidner to Maxx Williams. Michigan scored the only points of the second quarter on a 24-yard touchdown pass from Devin Garder to Devin Funchess, giving Michigan a 14–7 lead at halftime. Michigan scored the first points of the third quarter on a two-yard touchdown run from Derrick Green, but Minnesota responded with a 44-yard field goal from Chris Hawthorne. Michigan responded with a 12-yard touchdown run from Toussaint. Minnesota opened the scoring in the fourth quarter with a 27-yard field goal from Hawthorne to make the score 28–13, but Michigan scored the final 14 points of the game via a two-yard touchdown run from Devin Gardner and a 72-yard interception return for a touchdown from Blake Countess.

The game was Michigan's first game without a turnover since its 2011 meeting with Minnesota, and the first time Gardner had started a game as a quarterback without throwing at least one interception. Graham Glasgow replaced Jack Miller as the team's starting center, while Chris Bryant replaced Glasgow as the team's left guard. Michigan's offense did not attempt a pass during the first quarter of the game. Blake Countess's interception in the fourth quarter was his fourth of the season; he became the first Wolverine since Donovan Warren in 2009 to have four interceptions in a season.

=== At Penn State ===
Michigan at Penn State

Team	1	2	3	4	OT	2OT	3OT	4OT	Total
#18 Wolverines	10	0	17	7	0	3	0	3	40
• Nittany Lions	7	14	3	10	0	3	0	6	43

- Date: October 12
- Location: Beaver Stadium
  State College, Pennsylvania
- Game start: 5:05 EDT
- Elapsed time: 4:11
- Game attendance: 107,884
- Game weather: 64 °F (18 °C), Sunny, E 7 mph (11 km/h)
- Referee: Todd Geerlings
- TV announcers (ESPN): Joe Tessitore, Matt Millen & Maria Taylor

Scoring summary
1	9:39	PSU	Brandon Felder 12-yard pass from Christian Hackenberg (Sam Ficken kick)	PSU 7–0
1	8:19	MICH	Devin Funchess 59-yard pass from Devin Gardner (Brendan Gibbons kick)	TIE 7–7
1	:49	MICH	Brendan Gibbons 47-yard field goal	MICH 10–7
2	11:29	PSU	Jesse James 20-yard pass from Christian Hackenberg (Sam Ficken kick)	PSU14–10
2	7:06	PSU	Brandon Felder 24-yard pass from Christian Hackenberg (Sam Ficken kick)	PSU 21–10
3	14:50	MICH	Frank Clark 24-yard fumble recovery (Brendan Gibbons kick)	PSU 21–17
3	8:50	MICH	Brendan Gibbons 38-yard field goal	PSU 21–20
3	4:21	PSU	Sam Ficken 45-yard field goal	PSU 24–20
3	:28	MICH	Jeremy Gallon 16-yard pass from Devin Gardner (Brendan Gibbons kick)	MICH 27–24
4	10:28	MICH	Devin Funchess 37-yard pass from Devin Gardner (Brendan Gibbons kick)	MICH 34–24
4	6:35	PSU	Sam Ficken 43-yard field goal	MICH 34–27
4	:27	PSU	Christian Hackenberg 1-yard run (Sam Ficken kick)	TIE 34–34
2OT		MICH	Brendan Gibbons 25-yard field goal	MICH 37–34
2OT		PSU	Sam Ficken 36-yard field goal	TIE 37–37
4OT		MICH	Brendan Gibbons 40-yard field goal	MICH 40–37
4OT		PSU	Bill Belton 2-yard run	PSU 43–40

Following its game against Minnesota, Michigan traveled to State College to face the Penn State Nittany Lions for the first time since 2010. In the previous meeting, Penn State won by a score of 41–31.

Penn State won the game, defeating Michigan 43–40 after four overtime periods. Penn State opened the scoring in the first quarter with a 12-yard touchdown pass from Christian Hackenberg to Brandon Felder. Michigan responded with a 59-yard touchdown pass from Devin Gardner to Devin Funchess and a 47-yard field goal from Brendan Gibbons, which gave Michigan a 10–7 lead after the first quarter. Penn State responded in the second quarter with 14 unanswered points, via a 20-yard touchdown pass from Hackenberg to Jesse James and a 24-yard touchdown pass from Hackenberg to Felder, making the score 21–10 in favor of Penn State at halftime. Michigan responded with the first ten points of the third quarter. Frank Clark recovered a Penn State fumble and returned it 24 yards for a touchdown, while Gibbons added a 23-yard to make the score 21–20 in favor of Penn State. Penn State responded with a 45-yard field goal from Sam Ficken, but Michigan regained the lead via a 16-yard touchdown pass from Gardner to Jeremy Gallon. In the fourth quarter, Michigan added to its lead with a 37-yard touchdown pass from Gardner to Funchess, making the score 34–24. Penn State scored the next ten points—a 43-yard field goal from Ficken and a one-yard run from Hackenberg—to tie the game and send it to overtime. Neither team scored in the first overtime. In the second overtime, Gibbons kicked a 25-yard field goal for Michigan, but Penn State responded with a 36-yard field goal from Ficken. After neither team scored in the third overtime, Gibbons gave Michigan a three-point lead with a 40-yard field goal in the fourth overtime, but Penn State responded with a two-yard touchdown run from Bill Belton to win the game.

The game was the longest in Michigan football history, surpassing triple overtime victories against Michigan State in 2004 and Illinois in 2010. Devin Funchess recorded over 100 receiving yards for the second consecutive week. Frank Clark recorded two sacks and two fumble recoveries, as well as a defensive touchdown, giving Michigan its second consecutive week with a defensive touchdown. Jake Ryan played for the first time since his ACL injury in the spring. Brendan Gibbons recorded his 127th consecutive point after touchdown (PAT), setting a new Michigan record and passing JD Carlson in the process. Desmond Morgan recorded eight tackles during the game.

=== Vs. Indiana ===
Indiana at Michigan

Team	1	2	3	4	Total
Hoosiers	7	10	23	7	47
• Wolverines	14	14	14	21	63

- Date: October 19
- Location: Michigan Stadium
  Ann Arbor, Michigan
- Game start: 3:46 p.m. EDT
- Elapsed time: 3:38
- Game attendance: 109,503
- Game weather: 53 °F (12 °C), Overcast, SW 15 mph (24 km/h)
- Referee: Jerry McGinn
- TV announcers (BTN): Matt Devlin, Glen Mason & Jon Jansen

Scoring summary
1	10:28	IND	Cody Latimer 59-yard pass from Nate Sudfeld (Mitch Ewald kick)	IND 7–0
1	8:07	MICH	Devin Gardner 13-yard run (Brendan Gibbons kick)	TIE 7–7
1	4:33	MICH	Fitzgerald Toussaint 2-yard run (Brendan Gibbons kick)	MICH 14–7
2	7:02	MICH	Fitzgerald Toussaint 7-yard run (Brendan Gibbons kick)	MICH 21–7
2	5:59	IND	Shane Wynn 33-yard pass from Tre Roberson (Mitch Ewald kick)	MICH 21–14
2	:40	MICH	Jeremy Gallon 21-yard pass from Devin Gardner (Brendan Gibbons kick)	MICH 28–14
2	:00	IND	Mitch Ewald 50-yard field goal	MICH 28–17
3	13:18	IND	Kevin Coleman 2-yard run (Mitch Ewald kick)	MICH 28–24
3	11:17	MICH	Jeremy Gallon 50-yard pass from Devin Gardner (Brendan Gibbons kick)	MICH 35–24
3	9:27	IND	Shane Wynn 5-yard pass from Tre Roberson (Mitch Ewald kick)	MICH 35–31
3	6:17	IND	Mitch Ewald 23-yard field goal	MICH 35–34
3	4:06	MICH	Fitzgerald Toussaint 1-yard run (Brendan Gibbons kick)	MICH 42–34
3	2:56	IND	Kofi Hughes 67-yard pass from Tre Roberson (Two-point conversion failed)	MICH 42–40
4	13:40	MICH	Devin Gardner 6-yard run (Brendan Gibbons kick)	MICH 49–40
4	12:15	IND	Tre Roberson 15-yard run (Mitch Ewald kick)	MICH 49–47
4	6:01	MICH	Devin Gardner 6-yard run (Brendan Gibbons kick)	MICH 56–47
4	1:12	MICH	Fitzgerald Toussaint 27-yard run (Brendan Gibbons kick)	MICH 63–47

After its trip to State College, Michigan hosted the Indiana Hoosiers for the first time since 2010. Michigan won the previous game by a score of 42–35.

The game turned into a shootout, with Michigan winning 63–47. Indiana opened the scoring in the first quarter via a 59-yard touchdown pass from Nate Sudfeld to Cody Latimer. Michigan responded with a 13-yard touchdown run from Devin Gardner and then took the lead via a two-yard touchdown run from Fitzgerald Toussaint. Michigan added to its lead in the second quarter via a seven-yard touchdown run from Toussaint, but Indiana responded with a 33-yard touchdown pass from Tre Roberson to Shane Wynn, cutting Michigan's lead to seven points. Michigan added a 21-yard touchdown pass from Gardner to Jeremy Gallon, but as time expired in the half, Mitch Ewald kicked a 50-yard field goal, making the score 28–17 in favor of Michigan at halftime. The teams combined to score 37 points in the third quarter. Indiana cut Michigan's lead to four with a two-yard touchdown run from Tevin Coleman, but Michigan responded with a 50-yard touchdown pass from Gardner to Gallon. Indiana answered with a five-yard touchdown pass from Roberson to Wynn and then reduced Michigan's lead to one point with a 23-yard field goal from Ewald. Michigan answered with a one-yard touchdown run from Toussaint, but Indiana responded with a 67-yard touchdown pass from Roberson to Kofi Hughes, making the score 42–40 in favor of Michigan. In the fourth quarter, Michigan responded with a six-yard touchdown run from Gardner, but Indiana answered with a 15-yard touchdown run from Tre Roberson. Michigan once again extended its lead to nine points with a six-yard touchdown run from Gardner and then ended the scoring with a 27-yard touchdown run from Toussaint.

Jeremy Gallon broke the single-game receiving record for both Michigan and the Big Ten Conference during the game, catching 14 passes for a total of 369 yards. Gardner broke Michigan's single game records for both passing yards (503) and total offense (584). Michigan's offense set a new school record for total yardage with 751 yards of offense, breaking the previous record of 727 yards against Delaware State in 2009. Thomas Gordon recorded his first two interceptions of the season during the game. With the win, Michigan became bowl eligible.

=== At Michigan State ===
Michigan at Michigan State
(Paul Bunyan Trophy)

Team	1	2	3	4	Total
#23 Wolverines	3	3	0	0	6
• #24 Spartans	3	10	3	13	29

- Date: November 2
- Location: Spartan Stadium
  East Lansing, Michigan
- Game start: 3:36 p.m. EDT
- Elapsed time: 3:17
- Game attendance: 76,306
- Game weather: 46 °F (8 °C), Cloudy, NNE 9 mph (14 km/h)
- Referee: Bill LeMonnier
- TV announcers (ABC): Brad Nessler, Todd Blackledge & Holly Rowe

Scoring summary
1	10:38	MICH	Matt Wile 49-yard field goal	MICH 3–0
1	9:10	MSU	Michael Geiger 40-yard field goal	TIE 3–3
2	11:19	MSU	Michael Geiger 44-yard field goal	MSU 6–3
2	3:22	MICH	Brendan Gibbons 39-yard field goal	TIE 6–6
2	:23	MSU	Bennie Fowler 13-yard pass from Connor Cook (Michael Geiger kick)	MSU 13–6
3	9:54	MSU	Michael Geiger 35-yard field goal	MSU 16–6
4	10:31	MSU	Connor Cook 1-yard run (Kick blocked)	MSU 22–6
4	2:43	MSU	Jeremy Langford 40-yard run (Michael Geiger kick)	MSU 29–6

Following its clash with Indiana, Michigan traveled to East Lansing to face its in-state rival, the Michigan State Spartans. Michigan won the previous game 12–10 on a last second field goal from Brendan Gibbons.

Michigan State dominated the game, winning 29–6. Michigan opened the scoring in the first quarter via a 49-yard field goal from Matt Wile, but Michigan State responded with a field goal of its own—a 40-yard one from Michael Geiger. In the second quarter, Michigan State took the lead on a 44-yard field goal from Geiger, but Michigan responded with a 34-yard field goal from Brendan Gibbons. Michigan State regained the lead on a 14-yard touchdown pass from Connor Cook to Bennie Fowler. After leading 13–6 at halftime, Michigan State scored all points that occurred after halftime. In the third quarter, Geiger added a 35-yard field goal to give Michigan State a 16–6 lead. In the fourth quarter, Michigan State added two touchdowns via a one-yard touchdown run from Connor Cook and a 40-yard touchdown run from Jeremy Langford.

Michigan rushed for −48 yards, which was a school record for the lowest total rushing yards in a single game. Michigan fell to 35–24–2 when the two teams played games involving the Paul Bunyan Trophy.

=== Vs. Nebraska ===
Nebraska at Michigan

Team	1	2	3	4	Total
• Cornhuskers	10	0	0	7	17
Wolverines	0	3	7	3	13

- Date: November 9
- Location: Michigan Stadium
  Ann Arbor, Michigan
- Game start: 3:36 p.m. EST
- Elapsed time: 3:04
- Game attendance: 112,204
- Game weather: 55 °F (13 °C), Partly cloudy, SW 20 mph (32 km/h)
- Referee: John O'Neil
- TV announcers (ABC): Sean McDonough, Chris Spielman & Shannon Spake

Scoring summary
1	8:09	NEB	Pat Smith 21-yard field goal	NEB 3–0
1	2:50	NEB	Ameer Abdullah 8-yard run	NEB 10–0
2	11:47	MICH	Brendan Gibbons 27-yard field goal	NEB 10–3
3	9:56	MICH	Devin Funchess 5-yard pass from Devin Gardner (Brendan Gibbons kick)	TIE 10–10
4	8:08	MICH	Brendan Gibbons 40-yard field goal	MICH 13–10
4	2:03	NEB	Ameer Abdullah 5-yard pass from Tommy Armstrong, Jr. (Michael Geiger kick)	NEB 17–13

After its trip to East Lansing, Michigan hosted the Nebraska Cornhuskers. The previous meeting saw Michigan lose starting quarterback Denard Robinson to injury in the first half and it eventually lost the game 23–9.

Nebraska defeated Michigan 17–13 in a low-scoring affair. Nebraska opened the scoring in the first quarter via a 21-yard field goal from Pat Smith and an eight-yard run from Ameer Abdullah. Michigan responded in the second quarter with a 27-yard field goal from Brendan Gibbons, giving Nebraska a 10–3 lead at halftime. Michigan tied the game in the third quarter with a 5-yard touchdown pass from Devin Gardner to Devin Funchess, and then took the lead in the fourth quarter via a 40-yard field goal from Gibbons. Nebraska responded with a five-yard touchdown pass from Tommy Armstrong to Abdullah to win the game.

The loss was Michigan's first at Michigan Stadium since Brady Hoke became the head coach in 2011. Both Dennis Norfleet and Chris Wormley recorded their first career fumble recoveries. The attendance of 112,204 marked the 250th consecutive game Michigan Stadium has seen crowds of over 100,000 people.

=== At Northwestern ===
Michigan at Northwestern

Team	1	2	3	4	OT	2OT	3OT	Total
• Wolverines	3	0	0	6	7	3	8	27
Wildcats	3	3	3	0	7	3	0	19

- Date: November 16
- Location: Ryan Field
  Evanston, Illinois
- Game start: 3:42 p.m. EST
- Elapsed time: 3:39
- Game attendance: 47,330
- Game weather: 53 °F (12 °C), Cloudy, S 15 mph (24 km/h)
- Referee: Bill LeMonnier
- TV announcers (BTN): Kevin Kugler, Glen Mason & J Leman

Scoring summary
1	8:45	MICH	Brendan Gibbons 25-yard field goal	MICH 3–0
1	2:47	NW	Jeff Budzien 40-yard field goal	TIE 3–3
2	0:00	NW	Jeff Budzien 22-yard field goal	NW 6–3
3	2:35	NW	Jeff Budzien 29-yard field goal	NW 9–3
4	11:45	MICH	Brendan Gibbons 28-yard field goal	NW 9–6
4	0:00	MICH	Brendan Gibbons 44-yard field goal	TIE 9–9
1OT		MICH	Jake Butt 11-yard pass from Devin Gardner (Brendan Gibbons kick)	MICH 16–9
1OT		NW	Kain Colter 1-yard run (Jeff Budzien kick)	TIE 16–16
2OT		NW	Jeff Budzien 36-yard field goal	NW 19–16
2OT		MICH	Brendan Gibbons 29-yard field goal	TIE 19–19
3OT		MICH	Devin Gardner 5-yard run (Devin Gardner rush)	MICH 27–19

Following its game against Nebraska, Michigan traveled to Evanston to face the Northwestern Wildcats. Michigan won the previous meeting 38–31 in overtime.

Michigan stunned Northwestern with a last second field goal to tie the game, and then won in triple overtime by a score of 27–19. The teams traded field goals in the first quarter, with Michigan scoring first via a 25-yard field goal from Brendan Gibbons, while Northwestern responded with a 40-yard field goal from Jeff Budzien. Northwestern scored the only points of the second quarter via a 22-yard field goal from Budzien and led 6–3 at halftime. Northwestern also scored the only points of the third quarter via a 29-yard field goal from Budzien to take a 9–3 lead. Michigan responded with two field goals from Brendan Gibbons—one from 28 yards and one from 44 yards, with the second one coming as time expired. The teams traded touchdowns in the first overtime, with Michigan scoring via an 11-yard touchdown pass from Devin Gardner to Jake Butt, while Kain Colter scored via a one-yard run for Northwestern. The teams traded field goals in the second overtime. Jeff Budzien kicked a 36-yard field goal for Northwestern, while Brendan Gibbons added a 29-yard field goal for Michigan. Michigan won the game in the third overtime via a 5-yard touchdown run from Gardner, converting a two-point attempt via a Gardner run, and then stopping Northwestern's offense during Northwestern's attempt.

Michigan improved its record to 9–2 in games that were decided in overtime. Jake Butt's touchdown in the first overtime was his first career touchdown. Jeremy Gallon became the school's tenth player to record 1,000 receiving yards in a season and the first since Mario Manningham did so in 2007.

=== At Iowa ===
Michigan at Iowa

Team	1	2	3	4	Total
Wolverines	7	14	0	0	21
• Hawkeyes	7	0	7	10	24

- Date: November 23
- Location: Kinnick Stadium
  Iowa City, Iowa
- Game start: 12:01 p.m. EST
- Elapsed time: 3:15
- Game attendance: 65,708
- Game weather: 18 °F (−8 °C), Sunny, NNW 18 mph (29 km/h)
- Referee: Todd Geerlings
- TV announcers (BTN): Kevin Kugler, Glen Mason, & J Leman

Scoring summary
1	13:19	MICH	Brennan Beyer 7-yard interception return (Brendan Gibbons kick)	MICH 7–0
1	3:39	IOWA	CJ Fiedorowicz 5-yard pass from Jake Rudock (Mike Meyer kick)	TIE 7–7
2	8:31	MICH	A.J. Williams 2-yard pass from Devin Gardner (Brendan Gibbons kick)	MICH 14–7
2	:41	MICH	Jeremy Gallon 9-yard pass from Devin Gardner (Brendan Gibbons kick)	MICH 21–7
3	13:35	IOWA	Tevaun Smith 55-yard pass from Jake Rudock (Mike Meyer kick)	MICH 21–14
4	12:11	IOWA	Mark Wesiman 9-yard run (Mike Meyer kick)	TIE 21–21
4	6:02	IOWA	Mike Meyer 34-yard field goal	IOWA 24–21

After its game against Northwestern, Michigan completed its road portion of the schedule against the Iowa Hawkeyes. Michigan dominated the previous meeting, winning 42–17, with Devin Gardner accounting for all six of Michigan's touchdowns.

Iowa won the game by a score of 24–21. Michigan opened the scoring in the first quarter with a seven-yard interception return for a touchdown from Brennan Beyer, but Iowa responded with a five-yard touchdown pass from Jake Rudock to CJ Fiedorowicz. Michigan scored the next fourteen points via a two-yard pass from Devin Gardner to A.J. Williams and a nine-yard pass from Gardner to Jeremy Gallon, giving Michigan a 21–7 lead at halftime. Iowa scored the next 17 points to win the game. In the third quarter, Jake Rudock completed a 55-yard touchdown pass to Tevaun Smith, cutting Michigan's lead to seven points. In the fourth quarter, Mark Weisman tied the game via a nine-yard touchdown run, and Mike Myer gave Iowa the victory with a 34-yard field goal.

The temperature at kickoff was 18 °F (−8 °C). Frank Clark had 2.5 tackles for a loss, while Michigan intercepted three passes and had its third defensive touchdown of the season. Blake Countess recorded his fifth interception of the season, while Raymon Taylor recorded his fourth interception of the season.

=== Vs. Ohio State ===
Ohio State at Michigan
(The Game)

Team	1	2	3	4	Total
• #3 Buckeyes	14	7	14	7	42
Wolverines	14	7	0	20	41

- Date: November 30
- Location: Michigan Stadium
  Ann Arbor, Michigan
- Game start: 12:06 p.m. EST
- Elapsed time: 3:32
- Game attendance: 113,511
- Game weather: 37 °F (3 °C), Partly cloudy, S 12 mph (19 km/h)
- Referee: Mike Cannon
- TV announcers (ABC): Brad Nessler, Todd Blackledge, & Holly Rowe

Scoring summary
1	9:24	MICH	Devin Gardner 1-yard run (Matt Wile kick)	MICH 7–0
1	5:08	OHST	Devin Smith 53-yard pass from Braxton Miller (Drew Basil kick)	TIE 7–7
1	2:11	MICH	Fitzgerald Toussaint 4-yard run (Matt Wile kick)	MICH 14–7
1	:55	OHST	Braxton Miller 53-yard run (Drew Basil kick)	TIE 14–14
2	14:28	MICH	Jeremy Gallon 17-yard pass from Devin Gardner (Matt Wile kick)	MICH 21–14
2	1:03	OHST	Braxton Miller 21-yard run (Drew Basil kick)	TIE 21–21
3	6:59	OHST	Braxton Miller 3-yard run (Drew Basil kick)	OSU 28–21
3	1:05	OHST	Jeff Heuerman 22-yard pass from Braxton Miller (Drew Basil kick)	OSU 35–21
4	11:15	MICH	Drew Dileo 11-yard pass from Devin Gardner (Matt Wile kick)	OSU 35–28
4	5:01	MICH	Jake Butt 2-yard pass from Devin Gardner (Matt Wile kick)	TIE 35–35
4	2:20	OHST	Carlos Hyde 1-yard run (Drew Basil kick)	OSU 42–35
4	:32	MICH	Devin Funchess 2-yard pass from Devin Gardner (pass failed)	OSU 42–41

Following its road finale against Iowa, Michigan faced Ohio State in the 110th meeting of "The Game". Ohio State won the previous edition 26–21.

Ohio State won a thrilling contest 42–41 after Michigan missed a go-ahead two-point conversion attempt with 32 seconds remaining in the game. The teams combined for 28 points in the first quarter. Michigan opened the scoring via a one-yard touchdown run from Devin Gardner, but Ohio State responded with a 53-yard touchdown pass from Braxton Miller to Devin Smith. Michigan regained the lead via a four-yard touchdown run from Fitzgerald Toussaint, but Ohio State responded with a 53-yard touchdown run from Miller. Michigan regained the lead in the second quarter via a 17-yard touchdown pass from Devin Gardner to Jeremy Gallon, but Ohio State responded with a 21-yard touchdown run from Braxton Miller, making the score 21–21 at halftime. In the third quarter, Ohio State took the lead for the first time in the game, with Braxton Miller scoring on a 3-yard touchdown run. Ohio State added to its lead via a 22-yard touchdown pass from Miller to Jeff Heuerman, making the score 35–21 in favor of Ohio State at the end of the third quarter. In the fourth quarter, Michigan responded with an 11-yard touchdown pass from Gardner to Drew Dileo and a two-yard pass from Gardner to Jake Butt, which tied the score at 35. Ohio State regained the lead via a one-yard touchdown run from Carlos Hyde, but Michigan responded with a two-yard touchdown pass from Gardner to Devin Funchess. Instead of attempting the extra point to send the game to overtime, Michigan decided to go for a two-point conversion to win the game in regulation. Gardner's pass was intercepted and Ohio State won its second consecutive game over Michigan.

Devin Gardner completed 32 of his 45 attempted passes for 451 yards and four touchdowns. This was his second career game of over 400 passing yards; he is the only Michigan quarterback to have ever thrown for 400 passing yards in a single game. Gardner's 451 passing yards and Gallon's 175 receiving yards are the most passing and receiving yards ever recorded against Ohio State in the history of the rivalry.

=== Vs. Kansas State ===
Michigan vs. Kansas State
(Buffalo Wild Wings Bowl)

Team	1	2	3	4	Total
Wolverines	3	3	0	8	14
• Wildcats	14	7	0	10	31

- Date: December 28
- Location: Sun Devil Stadium
  Tempe, Arizona
- Game start: 10:15 p.m. EST
- Elapsed time: 3:03
- Game attendance: 53,284
- Game weather: 61 °F (16 °C), High clouds, W 7 mph (11 km/h)
- Referee: Land Clark
- TV announcers (ESPN/ESPN Radio): Sean McDonough, Chris Spielman, & Shannon Spake/Bill Rosinski, David Norrie, & Joe Schad

For its final game of the season, Michigan faced Kansas State in the Buffalo Wild Wings Bowl. This was the first ever meeting between the two schools. This was Michigan's forty-third bowl game in its history, and the first time it had ever played in the Buffalo Wild Wings Bowl. It was also the first time Michigan played in Arizona since the 1986 Fiesta Bowl, when Michigan defeated Nebraska 27–23.

== Depth chart ==
Starters and backups against Central Michigan. Following Drake Johnson's season-ending injury against Central Michigan, Derrick Green replaced him as the backup running back, while Thomas Rawls replaced Justice Hayes as the third-string running back.

Defense

FS
Jarrod Wilson
Jeremy Clark
Courtney Avery

WLB	MLB	SLB
⋅	Desmond Morgan	⋅
Royce Jenkins-Stone	Joe Bolden	⋅
Ben Gedeon	Mike McCray	⋅

SS
Thomas Gordon
Josh Furman
Dymonte Thomas

CB
Blake Countess
Channing Stribling
⋅

DE	DT	DT	DE
Keith Heitzman	Quinton Washington	Jibreel Black	Frank Clark
Matt Godin	Ondre Pipkins	Ryan Glasgow	Mario Ojemudia
⋅	⋅	Willie Henry	⋅

CB
Raymon Taylor
Delonte Hollowell
Jourdan Lewis

Offense

WR
Jeremy Gallon
Joe Reynolds
⋅

LT	LG	C	RG	RT
Taylor Lewan	Graham Glasgow	Jack Miller	Kyle Kalis	Michael Schofield
Ben Braden	Chris Bryant	Joey Burzynski	Joey Burzynski	Erik Magnuson
⋅	⋅	⋅	⋅	⋅

TE
Devin Funchess
A.J. Williams
Jake Butt

WR
Jehu Chesson
Jeremy Jackson
⋅

QB
Devin Gardner
Shane Morris
Brian Cleary

RB
Fitzgerald Toussaint
Drake Johnson
Justice Hayes

FB
Joe Kerridge
Sione Houma
⋅

Special teams
PK Brendan Gibbons
PK Matt Wile
P Matt Wile
KR Dennis Norfleet/Drew Dileo
PR Dennis Norfleet
LS Jareth Glanda
H Drew Dileo

== Awards ==
Fifth-year senior offensive tackle Taylor Lewan earned his second consecutive and Michigan's third consecutive Rimington-Pace Offensive lineman of the Year award and tight end Devin Funchess was selected as the Kwalick-Clark Tight end of the Year. Lewan earned first-team All-Big Ten Conference recognition from both the coaches and the media, while Funchess and Blake Countess were All-Conference first team by the media and second-team honors by the coaches. Jeremy Gallon was a second team selection by both the coaches and the media, while Frank Clark was recognized as second-team by the coaches and honorable mention by the media. Other honorable mention selections were Jibreel Black (coaches and media), Devin Gardner, Brendan Gibbons and Raymon Taylor (media) and Michael Schofield (coaches). Following the season Gallon was selected team MVP.

Lewan was a first team All-American selection by Sporting News, a second team selection by the Associated Press, CBSSports.com, Walter Camp Football Foundation, Sports Illustrated and a third team selection by Athlon Sports. Countess, Funchess and Gallon were honorable mention selections by Sports Illustrated.

=== All-star games ===
Game	Date	Site	Players
2014 East–West Shrine Game	January 18, 2014	Tropicana Field; St. Petersburg, Florida	Jeremy Gallon
2014 Senior Bowl	January 25, 2013	Ladd–Peebles Stadium, Mobile, Alabama	Michael Schofield

== Roster ==
2013 Michigan Wolverines football team roster
Players
Coaches
Offense

Pos.	#	Name	Class
WR	3	Bo Dever	RFr
RB	5	Justice Hayes	So
QB	6	Brian Cleary	RFr
QB	7	Shane Morris	Fr
QB	8	Russell Bellomy (injured)	So
WR	9	Drew Dileo	Sr
WR	10	Da'Mario Jones	Fr
QB	13	Alex Swieca	So
QB	15	Alex Moores	Fr
WR	16	Jack Wangler	Fr
WR	17	Jeremy Jackson	Sr
RB	18	DeAnthony Hardison	RFr
RB	20	Drake Johnson (injured)	RFr
WR	21	Jeremy Gallon	Sr
RB	23	Dennis Norfleet	So
RB	27	Derrick Green	Fr
RB	28	Fitzgerald Toussaint	Sr
RB	32	Deveon Smith	Fr
RB	33	Wyatt Shallman	Fr
FB	36	Joe Kerridge	So
RB	37	Bobby Henderson	RFr
RB	38	Thomas Rawls	Jr
FB	39	Sione Houma	So
WR	41	Anthony Capatina	Jr
TE	42	Dylan Esterline	Jr
TE	46	Clark Grace	RFr
WR	49	Brad Anlauf	RFr
RB	51	Bobby Henderson	RFr
OL	55	David Dawson	Fr
OL	56	Joey Burzynski	Jr
OL	57	Patrick Kugler	Fr
OL	58	Chris Bryant	So
OL	60	Jack Miller	So
OL	61	Graham Glasgow	So
OL	62	Blake Bars	RFr
OL	63	Ben Pliska	RFr
OL	65	Kyle Bosch	Fr
OL	66	Dan Liesman	RFr
OL	67	Kyle Kalis	RFr
OL	69	Erik Gunderson	Sr
OL	70	Kristian Mateus	Jr
OL	71	Ben Braden	RFr
OL	72	Logan Tuley-Tillman	Fr
OL	73	Chris Fox	Fr
OL	74	Dan Samuelson	Fr
OL	75	Michael Schofield	Sr
OL	77	Taylor Lewan (C)	Sr
OL	78	Erik Magnuson	RFr
TE	80	Khalid Hill	Fr
WR	81	Csont'e York	Fr
WR	82	Amara Darboh (injured)	So
WR	83	Jaron Dukes	Fr
TE	84	A.J. Williams	So
WR	85	Joe Reynolds	Sr
WR	86	Jehu Chesson	RFr
TE	87	Devin Funchess	So
TE	88	Jake Butt	Fr
WR	89	Jonathan Keizer	So
TE	91	Alex Mitropoulos-Rundus	So
TE	94	Jordan Paskorz	Jr
TE	95	Michael Jocz	RFr
QB	98	Devin Gardner	RJr

Defense

Pos.	#	Name	Class
LB	3	Mike McCray	Fr
LB	4	Cameron Gordon (C)	Sr
DB	6	Raymon Taylor	Jr
DT	7	Henry Poggi	Fr
DB	8	Channing Stribling	Fr
CB	11	Courtney Avery (C)	Sr
DB	12	Allen Gant	RFr
CB	13	Terry Richardson	So
S	14	Josh Furman	Jr
LB	15	James Ross	So
DB	18	Blake Countess	RSo
DB	20	Reon Dawson	Fr
S	22	Jarrod Wilson	So
DB	24	Delonte Hollowell	Jr
S	25	Dymonte Thomas	Fr
DB	26	Jourdan Lewis	Fr
DB	29	Ross Douglas	Fr
S	30	Thomas Gordon	Sr
S	32	Shaun Austin	RFr
DE	33	Taco Charlton	Fr
S	34	Jeremy Clark	RFr
LB	35	Joe Bolden	So
DB	36	AJ Pearson	RFr
DB	41	Anthony Capatina	Jr
LB	42	Ben Gedeon	Fr
DE	43	Chris Wormley	RFr
DB	44	Delano Hill	Fr
LB	47	Jake Ryan (C)	Jr
LB	48	Desmond Morgan	Jr
DE	50	Tom Strobel	RFr
LB	52	Royce Jenkins-Stone	So
DE	53	Mario Ojemudia	So
DT	54	Richard Ash	Jr
DE	55	Jibreel Black	Sr
DT	56	Ondre Pipkins	So
LB	57	Frank Clark	Jr
LB	59	Mark Lawson	RFr
DT	69	Willie Henry	RFr
DT	73	Maurice Hurst, Jr.	Fr
DT	76	Quinton Washington	Sr
DE	92	Keith Heitzman	So
DL	96	Ryan Glasgow	RFr
DE	97	Brennen Beyer	Jr
DE	99	Matt Godin	RFr

Special teams

Pos.	#	Name	Class
PK	34	Brendan Gibbons	Sr
P	43	Will Hagerup (S)	Sr
LS	43	Scott Sypniewski	Fr
PK	45	Matt Wile	Jr
PK	46	J.J. McGrath	Fr
LS	54	Jareth Glanda	Sr
LS	64	Brandon Duba	Fr
P	91	Kenneth Allen	RFr

Head coach

- Brady Hoke

Coordinators/assistant coaches

- Al Borges (offensive coordinator / quarterbacks)
- Greg Mattison (defensive coordinator)
- Dan Ferrigno (tight ends / special teams)
- Darrell Funk (offensive line)
- Jeff Hecklinski (wide receivers)
- Fred Jackson (running backs)
- Curt Mallory (defensive backs)
- Roy Manning (linebackers)
- Mark Smith (linebackers)
- Ernie Lawson (defensive graduate assistant)
- Aaron Wellman (strength and conditioning)
- Kevin Koger (graduate assistant)
- Adam Stenavich (offensive graduate assistant)

Legend

- (C) Team captain
- (S) Suspended
- (I) Ineligible
- Injured
- Redshirt

Roster
Last update: October 7, 2013

== Radio ==
Radio coverage for all games was broadcast statewide on The Michigan Wolverines Football Network and on Sirius XM Satellite Radio. The radio announcers were Frank Beckmann with play-by-play, Jim Brandstatter with color commentary, and Doug Karsch with sideline reports. This was Beckmann's 32nd and final season in the Michigan press box; he retired from sportscasting afterward.

== 2014 NFL draft ==
Rnd.	Pick	Team	Player	Pos.	College	Notes
1	11	Tennessee Titans	Taylor Lewan	T	Michigan	
3	95		Michael Schofield	T	Michigan	
7	244	New England Patriots	Jeremy Gallon	WR	Michigan	

In addition to the drafted players both Thomas Gordon (New York Giants) and Fitzgerald Toussaint (Baltimore Ravens) signed contracts as undrafted free agents.
