= Chris Hackett (American football) =

American football player (born 1993)

Profile
- Position: Safety

Personal information
- Born: August 3, 1993 (age 33); Tyler, Texas
- Listed height: 6 ft 0 in (1.83 m)
- Listed weight: 195 lb (88 kg)

Career information
- High school: Tyler (TX) John Tyler
- College: TCU
- NFL draft: 2015: undrafted

Career history
- Tampa Bay Buccaneers (2015)*; Oakland Raiders (2015–2016)*
- * Offseason or practice squad member only

Awards and highlights
- First-team All-Big 12 (2014)

Chris Hackett (born August 3, 1993) is an American football safety who is currently a free agent. He played college football at TCU.

== Early life ==
Hackett attended John Tyler High School in Tyler, Texas. He was rated by Rivals.com as a three-star recruit and ranked as the No. 38 safety in the nation in 2011. He committed to Texas Christian University (TCU) to play college football.

== College career ==
Hackett attended TCU from 2011 to 2014. After redshirting in 2011, Hackett became a starter his redshirt freshman season. He remained a starter through his junior season.

After his junior season, Hackett entered the 2015 NFL draft. He finished his career with 224 tackles and 12 interceptions.

== Professional career ==
=== 2015 NFL Combine ===
Pre-draft measurables
Height	Weight	Arm length	Hand span	40-yard dash	20-yard shuttle	Three-cone drill	Vertical jump	Broad jump
6 ft 0 in (1.83 m)	195 lb (88 kg)	31 1/2 in (0.80 m)	9 7/8 in (0.25 m)	4.81 s	4.20 s	7.12 s	32.0 in (0.81 m)	9 ft 3 in (2.82 m)
All values from the NFL Combine

=== Tampa Bay Buccaneers ===
After going unselected in the 2015 NFL draft, Hackett signed with the Tampa Bay Buccaneers as an undrafted free agent on May 5, 2015. On September 4, 2015, he was waived.

=== Oakland Raiders ===
On December 1, 2015, Hackett was signed to the Oakland Raiders' practice squad. On August 29, 2016, he was released by the Raiders.
