= John Hubert =

American football player (born 1991)

No. 23
- Position: Running back

Personal information
- Born: February 24, 1991 (age 35); Waco, Texas, U.S.
- Listed height: 5 ft 7 in (1.70 m)
- Listed weight: 191 lb (87 kg)

Career information
- High school: Waco (TX) Midway
- College: Kansas State

Awards and highlights
- First-team All-Big 12 (2012)

John Hubert (born February 24, 1991) is an American former college football running back who played for the Kansas State Wildcats.

== College career ==
As a freshman, Hubert redshirted during the 2009 season. In 2010, he was the backup to Daniel Thomas along with William Powell. Hubert received very limited playing time, rushing for 28 yards (1).

As a sophomore, Hubert won the starting running back position from Bryce Brown and Angelo Pease. In his first start against Eastern Kentucky, Hubert rushed 17 times for 91 yards. Against Miami, he ran for a career high of 166 yards. Hubert would go on to carry the ball 200 times for a total of 970 yards and catch 24 passes for 188 yards.

As a junior, Hubert maintained his starting position. He rushed 189 times for 947 yards and 15 touchdowns.

As a senior in 2012, he was the feature running back for Kansas State, when they won the Big 12 championship.

=== College statistics ===
Season	Team	GP	Rushing				
Season	Team	GP	Att	Yds	Avg	Lng	TD
2009	Kansas State	0	Redshirt				
2010	Kansas State	7	12	28	4.0	6	0
2011	Kansas State	13	200	970	4.9	47	3
2012	Kansas State	13	189	947	5.0	95	15
2013	Kansas State	13	198	1,048	5.3	63	10
Career		46	599	2,993	5.0	95	28

== Professional career ==
After going undrafted in the 2014 NFL draft, Hubert attended rookie minicamp on a tryout basis with the New Orleans Saints.
