= Jake Waters =

American football player and coach (born 1992)

Current position
- Title: Quarterbacks coach
- Team: Penn State
- Conference: Big Ten

Biographical details
- Born: March 20, 1992 (age 34); Council Bluffs, Iowa, U.S.

Playing career
- 2011–2012: Iowa Western
- 2013–2014: Kansas State
- 2015: Seattle Seahawks*
- 2016: Hamilton Tiger-Cats
- 2016: Saskatchewan Roughriders*
- Position: Quarterback

Coaching career (HC unless noted)
- 2015–2016: Iowa Western (volunteer QB)
- 2017: Iowa State (GA)
- 2018–2020: UTEP (WR)
- 2021–2023: Iowa State (OQC)
- 2024–2025: Iowa State (QB)
- 2026–present: Penn State (QB)

Accomplishments and honors

Awards
- Second-team MFC All-Conference selection in 2011; Set a NJCAA national record for completion percentage (73.3); 2012 NJCAA Offensive Player of the Year; 2012 National Champions; 2012 NJCAA First-team All-American; 2012 Midwest Football Conference Offensive Player of the Year; Second-team All-Big 12 (2014)

Jake Waters (born March 20, 1992) is an American former football quarterback who is the quarterbacks coach at Penn State. He played college football at Kansas State and was the Wildcats starting quarterback from 2013 to 2014.

== Early life ==
College recruiting
Name	Hometown	School	Height	Weight	40^{‡}	Commit date
Jake Waters; QB	Council Bluffs, Iowa	Saint Albert High School	6 ft 2 in (1.88 m)	215 lb (98 kg)	4.6	Dec 13, 2012
Jake Waters; QB	Recruit ratings: Scout: Rivals: (78)					
Overall recruit ranking: Scout: JC Rivals: JC ESPN: JC
Note: In many cases, Scout, Rivals, 247Sports, On3, and ESPN may conflict in their listings of height and weight.; In these cases, the average was taken. ESPN grades are on a 100-point scale.; Sources: "2013 Kansas State Football Commits". Rivals.; "2013 Kansas State Football Commits". Scout.; "ESPN". ESPN.; "Scout.com Team Recruiting Rankings". Scout.; "2013 Team Ranking". Rivals.com.

== College career ==
Waters started his college career at Iowa Western Community College where he was a two-year starter, 2012 National Champion, First-team All-American, and set the record for completion percentage (73.3), breaking the former record of Cam Newton.

In 2013, he transferred to Kansas State where he beat out Daniel Sams for the starting job. He passed for 2,469 yards with 18 touchdowns and nine interceptions. He also had six rushing touchdowns. Waters returned as a starter in 2014. He finished the year with 3,501 passing yards, 22 passing touchdowns, seven interceptions and nine rushing touchdowns.

=== College statistics ===
Season	Team	GP	Passing							Rushing		
Season	Team	GP	Cmp	Att	Pct	Yds	TD	Int	Rtg	Att	Yds	TD
2013	Kansas State	13	159	260	61.2	2,469	18	9	156.8	118	312	6
2014	Kansas State	13	262	397	66.0	3,501	22	7	154.8	154	484	9
Career		26	421	657	64.1	5,970	40	16	155.6	272	796	15

== Professional career ==
Waters was signed by the Seattle Seahawks on August 18, 2015, after an injury to incumbent backup quarterback Tarvaris Jackson. Waters was released on August 26, 2015.

Waters signed with the Hamilton Tiger-Cats of the Canadian Football League in April 2016. He dressed in all three of the Tiger-Cats' games as a backup before being traded to Saskatchewan.

Waters was traded to the Saskatchewan Roughriders for a negotiation list player on July 9, 2016.
