= 2012 Oklahoma Sooners football team =

American college football season

2012 Oklahoma Sooners football

Big 12 co-champion

Cotton Bowl Classic, L 13–41 vs. Texas A&M
- Conference: Big 12 Conference

Ranking
- Coaches: No. 15
- AP: No. 15
- Record: 10–3 (8–1 Big 12)
- Head coach: Bob Stoops (14th season)
- Co-offensive coordinators: Josh Heupel (2nd season); Jay Norvell (2nd season)
- Offensive scheme: No-huddle spread
- Defensive coordinator: Mike Stoops (6th season)
- Base defense: 3–4
- Captains: Gabe Ikard; Landry Jones; David King; Trey Millard; Tress Way
- Home stadium: Gaylord Family Oklahoma Memorial Stadium

2012 Big 12 Conference football standings
| | Conf. | | | Overall |
| Team | W | | L | W | | L |
|---|---|---|---|---|---|---|
| No. 12 Kansas State $+ | 8 | – | 1 | 11 | – | 2 |
| No. 15 Oklahoma + | 8 | – | 1 | 10 | – | 3 |
| No. 19 Texas | 5 | – | 4 | 9 | – | 4 |
| Oklahoma State | 5 | – | 4 | 8 | – | 5 |
| Baylor | 4 | – | 5 | 8 | – | 5 |
| TCU | 4 | – | 5 | 7 | – | 6 |
| Texas Tech | 4 | – | 5 | 8 | – | 5 |
| West Virginia | 4 | – | 5 | 7 | – | 6 |
| Iowa State | 3 | – | 6 | 6 | – | 7 |
| Kansas | 0 | – | 9 | 1 | – | 11 |
$ – BCS representative as conference champion; + – Conference co-champions; Rankings from AP Poll

The 2012 Oklahoma Sooners football team represented the University of Oklahoma in the 2012 NCAA Division I FBS football season, the 118th season of Sooner football. The team was led by two-time Walter Camp Coach of the Year Award winner, Bob Stoops, in his 14th season as head coach. They played their home games at Gaylord Family Oklahoma Memorial Stadium in Norman, Oklahoma. They were a charter member of the Big 12 Conference.

Conference play began with an upset loss at home to the Kansas State Wildcats on September 22 and concluded with a win against the TCU Horned Frogs in Fort Worth, Texas on December 1. The Sooners finished the regular season with a 10–2 record overall (8–1 in the Big 12), and shared the Big 12 Conference championship with K-State to win their eighth Big 12 title and 44th conference title overall. They faced former Big 12 member Texas A&M in the Cotton Bowl Classic, where they lost, 13–41. The Sooners were also the first team since Florida in 1993 to play against the top 3 Heisman vote-getters in the same season: Collin Klein of Kansas State, Manti Te'o of Notre Dame, and Johnny Manziel of Texas A&M (the Sooners only 3 losses on the season).

Following the season, Lane Johnson was selected 4th overall in the 2013 NFL draft, along with Landry Jones in the 4th round, Kenny Stills in the 5th, Justin Brown and Stacy McGee in the 6th, and David King in the 7th.

== Recruits ==
College recruiting
| Name | Hometown | School | Height | Weight | 40^{‡} | Commit date |
|---|---|---|---|---|---|---|
| Daniel Brooks; ATH | Port Lavaca, Texas | Calhoun HS | 5 ft 10 in (1.78 m) | 170 lb (77 kg) | 4.47 | Mar 10, 2011 |
| Daniel Brooks; ATH | Recruit ratings: Scout: Rivals: (75) | | | | | |
| Ty Darlington; OL | Apopka, Florida | Apopka HS | 6 ft 3 in (1.91 m) | 275 lb (125 kg) | 5.1 | Jun 17, 2011 |
| Ty Darlington; OL | Recruit ratings: Scout: Rivals: (80) | | | | | |
| Kasseim Everett; DB | Woodland Hills, California | Pierce CC | 5 ft 11 in (1.80 m) | 185 lb (84 kg) | 4.45 | Dec 21, 2011 |
| Kasseim Everett; DB | Recruit ratings: Scout: Rivals: (73) | | | | | |
| Courtney Gardner; WR | Roseville, California | Sierra CC | 6 ft 3 in (1.91 m) | 215 lb (98 kg) | 4.4 | Feb 1, 2012 |
| Courtney Gardner; WR | Recruit ratings: Scout: Rivals: (NR) | | | | | |
| Sam Grant; TE | North Royalton, Ohio | St. Edward HS | 6 ft 6 in (1.98 m) | 240 lb (110 kg) | 4.7 | Jan 30, 2012 |
| Sam Grant; TE | Recruit ratings: Scout: Rivals: (78) | | | | | |
| Brannon Green; TE | Fort Scott, Kansas | Fort Scott CC | 6 ft 4 in (1.93 m) | 260 lb (120 kg) | 4.72 | Dec 7, 2011 |
| Brannon Green; TE | Recruit ratings: Scout: Rivals: (NR) | | | | | |
| Laith Harlow; TE | Tallahassee, Florida | Amos P. Godby HS | 6 ft 5 in (1.96 m) | 240 lb (110 kg) | N/A | May 3, 2011 |
| Laith Harlow; TE | Recruit ratings: Scout: Rivals: (78) | | | | | |
| Trevor Knight; QB | San Antonio, Texas | Ronald Reagan HS | 6 ft 3 in (1.91 m) | 195 lb (88 kg) | 4.6 | Jul 13, 2011 |
| Trevor Knight; QB | Recruit ratings: Scout: Rivals: (79) | | | | | |
| Kyle Marrs; OL | San Antonio, Texas | Brandeis HS | 6 ft 6 in (1.98 m) | 302 lb (137 kg) | 5.4 | Feb 5, 2011 |
| Kyle Marrs; OL | Recruit ratings: Scout: Rivals: (79) | | | | | |
| John Michael McGee; OL | Texarkana, Texas | Texas HS | 6 ft 4 in (1.93 m) | 260 lb (120 kg) | 4.85 | Jun 22, 2011 |
| John Michael McGee; OL | Recruit ratings: Scout: Rivals: (80) | | | | | |
| Taylor McNamara; TE | San Diego, California | Westview HS | 6 ft 5 in (1.96 m) | 235 lb (107 kg) | 4.83 | Dec 28, 2011 |
| Taylor McNamara; TE | Recruit ratings: Scout: Rivals: (79) | | | | | |
| Durron Neal; WR | St. Louis, Missouri | De Smet Jesuit HS | 6 ft 1 in (1.85 m) | 195 lb (88 kg) | 4.49 | Jun 8, 2011 |
| Durron Neal; WR | Recruit ratings: Scout: Rivals: (81) | | | | | |
| Chaz Nelson; DE | Garden City, Kansas | Garden City CC | 6 ft 3 in (1.91 m) | 240 lb (110 kg) | 4.6 | Nov 27, 2011 |
| Chaz Nelson; DE | Recruit ratings: Scout: Rivals: (78) | | | | | |
| Michael Onuoha; DE | Edmond, Oklahoma | Edmond Santa Fe HS | 6 ft 5 in (1.96 m) | 225 lb (102 kg) | 4.8 | Jan 31, 2012 |
| Michael Onuoha; DE | Recruit ratings: Scout: Rivals: (78) | | | | | |
| Alex Ross; RB | Jenks, Oklahoma | Jenks HS | 6 ft 1 in (1.85 m) | 205 lb (93 kg) | 4.5 | Feb 8, 2011 |
| Alex Ross; RB | Recruit ratings: Scout: Rivals: (81) | | | | | |
| Zack Sanchez; ATH | Keller, Texas | Central HS | 6 ft 0 in (1.83 m) | 172 lb (78 kg) | 4.45 | Jan 30, 2012 |
| Zack Sanchez; ATH | Recruit ratings: Scout: Rivals: (75) | | | | | |
| Sterling Shepard; WR | Oklahoma City, Oklahoma | Heritage Hall HS | 5 ft 10 in (1.78 m) | 175 lb (79 kg) | 4.49 | Mar 1, 2011 |
| Sterling Shepard; WR | Recruit ratings: Scout: Rivals: (81) | | | | | |
| Gary Simon; DB | St. Petersburg, Florida | Gibbs HS | 6 ft 1 in (1.85 m) | 177 lb (80 kg) | N/A | Feb 1, 2012 |
| Gary Simon; DB | Recruit ratings: Scout: Rivals: (78) | | | | | |
| David Smith; RB | Midlothian, Illinois | Bremen HS | 6 ft 1 in (1.85 m) | 190 lb (86 kg) | N/A | Jan 17, 2012 |
| David Smith; RB | Recruit ratings: Scout: Rivals: (75) | | | | | |
| Eric Striker; LB | Seffner, Florida | Armwood HS | 6 ft 1 in (1.85 m) | 195 lb (88 kg) | N/A | Jun 4, 2011 |
| Eric Striker; LB | Recruit ratings: Scout: Rivals: (76) | | | | | |
| Charles Tapper; DE | Baltimore, Maryland | City College HS | 6 ft 4 in (1.93 m) | 255 lb (116 kg) | N/A | Jul 24, 2011 |
| Charles Tapper; DE | Recruit ratings: Scout: Rivals: (78) | | | | | |
| Damien Williams; RB | Yuma, Arizona | Arizona Western CC | 6 ft 1 in (1.85 m) | 215 lb (98 kg) | 4.5 | Feb 1, 2012 |
| Damien Williams; RB | Recruit ratings: Scout: Rivals: (NR) | | | | | |
| Derrick Woods; WR | Inglewood, California | Inglewood HS | 6 ft 1 in (1.85 m) | 180 lb (82 kg) | 4.5 | Dec 7, 2011 |
| Derrick Woods; WR | Recruit ratings: Scout: Rivals: (80) | | | | | |
Overall recruit ranking: Scout: 10 Rivals: 11
‡ Refers to 40-yard dash; Note: In many cases, Scout, Rivals, 247Sports, On3, and ESPN may conflict in their listings of height, weight and 40 time.; In these cases, the average was taken. ESPN grades are on a 100-point scale.; Sources: "Oklahoma 2012 Football Commitments". Rivals.; "2012 Player Commitments – Oklahoma". ESPN.; "2012 Team Ranking". Rivals.com.

== Schedule ==
| Date | Time | Opponent | Rank | Site | TV | Result | Attendance |
|---|---|---|---|---|---|---|---|
| September 1 | 9:30 p.m. | at UTEP* | No. 4 | Sun Bowl Stadium; El Paso, TX | FSN | W 24–7 | 40,137 |
| September 8 | 6:00 p.m. | Florida A&M* | No. 5 | Gaylord Family Oklahoma Memorial Stadium; Norman, OK | PPV | W 69–13 | 84,852 |
| September 22 | 6:50 p.m. | No. 15 Kansas State | No. 6 | Gaylord Family Oklahoma Memorial Stadium; Norman, OK | FOX | L 19–24 | 85,276 |
| October 6 | 2:30 p.m. | at Texas Tech | No. 17 | Jones AT&T Stadium; Lubbock, TX | ABC/ESPN2 | W 41–20 | 60,800 |
| October 13 | 11:00 a.m. | vs. No. 15 Texas | No. 13 | Cotton Bowl; Dallas, TX (Red River Rivalry) | ABC | W 63–21 | 92,500 |
| October 20 | 6:00 p.m. | Kansas^{†} | No. 10 | Gaylord Family Oklahoma Memorial Stadium; Norman, OK | FSN | W 52–7 | 84,532 |
| October 27 | 7:00 p.m. | No. 5 Notre Dame* | No. 8 | Gaylord Family Oklahoma Memorial Stadium; Norman, OK (College GameDay) | ABC | L 13–30 | 86,031 |
| November 3 | 11:00 a.m. | at Iowa State | No. 14 | Jack Trice Stadium; Ames, IA | ABC | W 35–20 | 56,585 |
| November 10 | 2:30 p.m. | Baylor | No. 14 | Gaylord Family Oklahoma Memorial Stadium; Norman, OK | FSN | W 42–34 | 84,945 |
| November 17 | 6:00 p.m. | at West Virginia | No. 13 | Mountaineer Field; Morgantown, WV | FOX | W 50–49 | 50,238 |
| November 24 | 2:30 p.m. | No. 22 Oklahoma State | No. 14 | Gaylord Family Oklahoma Memorial Stadium; Norman, OK (Bedlam Series) | ESPN | W 51–48 ^{OT} | 85,824 |
| December 1 | 11:00 a.m. | at TCU | No. 12 | Amon G. Carter Stadium; Fort Worth, TX | ESPN | W 24–17 | 47,501 |
| January 4, 2013 | 7:00 p.m. | vs. No. 10 Texas A&M* | No. 12 | Cowboys Stadium; Arlington, TX (Cotton Bowl Classic) | FOX | L 13–41 | 87,025 |
*Non-conference game; ^{†}Homecoming; Rankings from AP Poll released prior to the game; All times are in Central time

== Roster ==
2012 Oklahoma Sooners football team roster
Players
Coaches
Offense

| Pos. | # | Name | Class |
|---|---|---|---|
| WR | 3 | Sterling Shepard | Fr |
| WR | 4 | Kenny Stills | Jr |
| RB | 8 | Dominique Whaley | Sr |
| QB | 9 | Trevor Knight | Fr |
| QB | 10 | Blake Bell | So |
| QB | 11 | Kendal Thompson | Fr |
| QB | 12 | Landry Jones (C) | Sr |
| WR | 13 | Durron Neal | Fr |
| QB | 15 | Drew Allen | Jr |
| WR | 17 | Trey Metoyer | Fr |
| WR | 18 | Jalen Saunders | Jr |
| WR | 19 | Justin Brown | Sr |
| RB | 22 | Roy Finch | Jr |
| RB | 23 | Danzel Williams | Fr |
| RB | 24 | Brennan Clay | Jr |
| RB | 25 | David Smith | Fr |
| RB | 26 | Damien Williams | Jr |
| RB | 28 | Alex Ross | Fr |
| WR | 29 | Grant Bothun | Fr |
| FB | 32 | Marshall Musil | Jr |
| FB | 33 | Trey Millard (C) | Jr |
| RB | 34 | Daniel Brooks | Fr |
| RB | 35 | Julian Winters | So |
| FB | 36 | Joel Ossom | Sr |
| FB | 47 | Alex Christensen | Fr |
| FB | 48 | Aaron Ripkowski | So |
| FB | 49 | David Driskill | So |
| OL | 50 | Austin Woods | Jr |
| OL | 54 | Nila Kasitati | Fr |
| OL | 56 | Ty Darlington | Fr |
| OL | 61 | Ben Habern | Sr |
| OL | 64 | Gabe Ikard (C) | Jr |
| OL | 67 | Robert Hollis | Fr |
| OL | 68 | Bronson Irwin | Jr |
| OL | 69 | Lane Johnson | Sr |
| OL | 70 | Dylan Dismuke | Fr |
| OL | 71 | Tyrus Thompson | So |
| OL | 72 | Derek Farniok | Fr |
| OL | 73 | John McGee | Fr |
| OL | 74 | Adam Shead | So |
| OL | 75 | Tyler Evans | Sr |
| OL | 77 | Will Latu | Jr |
| OL | 78 | Kyle Marrs | Fr |
| OL | 79 | Daryl Williams | So |
| WR | 80 | Derrick Woods | Fr |
| TE | 81 | Sam Grant | Fr |
| TE | 82 | Brannon Green | Jr |
| TE | 83 | John-Philip Hughes | Fr |
| WR | 84 | Don Caudill | Jr |
| WR | 85 | Courtney Gardner | Jr |
| TE | 85 | Geneo Grissom | So |
| WR | 86 | Brandon Kitchens | Fr |
| WR | 86 | Lacolton Bester | Jr |
| WR | 87 | Derrick Bradley | Sr |
| TE | 88 | Taylor McNamara | Fr |
| TE | 89 | Chase Buck | Jr |
| TE | 89 | Connor Knight | Fr |

Defense

| Pos. | # | Name | Class |
|---|---|---|---|
| DB | 1 | Tony Jefferson | Jr |
| DB | 2 | Julian Wilson | So |
| LB | 5 | Joseph Ibiloye | Sr |
| DB | 6 | Demontre Hurst | Sr |
| LB | 7 | Corey Nelson | Jr |
| DB | 9 | Gabe Lynn | Jr |
| DE | 10 | Rashod Favors | So |
| DE | 11 | R. J. Washington | Sr |
| LB | 13 | Londell Taylor | Fr |
| DB | 14 | Aaron Colvin | Jr |
| DB | 15 | Lamar Harris | Sr |
| DB | 19 | Joe Powell | Jr |
| LB | 20 | Frank Shannon | Fr |
| LB | 21 | Tom Wort | Jr |
| DB | 22 | Cortez Johnson | So |
| DB | 23 | Kass Everett | Jr |
| DB | 24 | Bennett Okotcha | Fr |
| LB | 25 | Aaron Franklin | So |
| DB | 26 | Zack Sanchez | Fr |
| DB | 27 | Gary Simon | Fr |
| DB | 30 | Javon Harris | Sr |
| LB | 31 | Daniel Franklin | Sr |
| DE | 37 | Chaz Nelson | Jr |
| DB | 38 | Brandon Young | So |
| LB | 40 | P.L. Lindley | Fr |
| LB | 41 | Eric Striker | Fr |
| DB | 42 | Jesse Paulsen | Sr |
| DE | 44 | Nathan Hughes | Fr |
| LB | 45 | Caleb Gastelum | So |
| DB | 46 | Eric Doughtie | Fr |
| DT | 53 | Casey Walker | Sr |
| LB | 55 | Jaydan Bird | Sr |
| DT | 77 | Marquis Anderson | Fr |
| DT | 80 | Jordan Phillips | Fr |
| DE | 84 | Mike Onuoha | Fr |
| DE | 90 | David King (C) | Sr |
| DE | 91 | Charles Tapper | Fr |
| DT | 92 | Stacy McGee (S) | Sr |
| DT | 93 | Jordan Wade | Fr |
| DT | 94 | Torrea Peterson | So |
| DT | 95 | Damon Williams | So |
| DE | 96 | Mitch Tate | Fr |
| DT | 97 | Jamarkus McFarland | Sr |
| DE | 98 | Chuka Ndulue | So |

Special teams

| Pos. | # | Name | Class |
|---|---|---|---|
| K | 18 | Michael Hunnicutt | So |
| P | 36 | Tress Way (C) | Sr |
| P | 37 | Dylan Seibert | Fr |
| K | 38 | Jack Steed | Fr |
| K | 39 | Nick Hodgson | So |
| K | 47 | Eric Hosek | Fr |

Head coach

- Bob Stoops (14th season)

Coordinators/assistant coaches

- Mike Stoops – Associate head coach/defensive coordinator/Defensive backs
- Josh Heupel – Co-offensive Coordinator/quarterbacks
- Jay Norvell – Co-offensive Coordinator/Wide receivers
- Bobby Jack Wright – Assistant Head Coach/Defensive Ends/special teams coordinator
- Tim Kish – Assistant Defensive coordinator/linebackers
- Cale Gundy – Running backs & full backs/recruiting coordinator
- James Patton – Centers/Guards
- Jackie Shipp – Defensive line
- Bruce Kittle – Offensive tackles/Tight ends
- Jerry Schmidt – Director of Sports Enhancement
- Matt McMillen – Administrative Coordinator
- Merv Johnson – Director of football operations
- Reed Case – On-Campus Recruiting Coordinator
- Joe Jon Finley – Offensive Graduate Assistant
- Joey Halzle – Offensive Graduate Assistant
- Ryan Walters – Defensive Graduate Assistant

Legend

- (C) Team captain
- (S) Suspended
- (I) Ineligible
- Injured
- Redshirt

Roster
Last update: September 2, 2012

== Game summaries ==
=== UTEP ===
#4 Oklahoma Sooners at UTEP Miners – Game summary

| Quarter | 1 | 2 | 3 | 4 | Total |
|---|---|---|---|---|---|
| #4 Oklahoma | 7 | 0 | 3 | 14 | 24 |
| UTEP | 7 | 0 | 0 | 0 | 7 |

at Sun Bowl Stadium, El Paso, Texas

- Date: September 1
- Game time: 8:35 p.m. MDT
- Game weather: Temperature: 86 °F (30 °C) • Wind: E 6 • Weather: Clear
- Game attendance: 40,137
- Referee: Referee: Greg Burks • Umpire: Scott Campbell • Linesman: George Gusman • Line judge: Kevin Mar • Back judge: Brian Ernest • Field judge: Randy Smith • Side judge: Gene Semko • Scorer: Olivas
- TV announcers (FSN): Mike Morgan (Play-by-play), J. C. Pearson (Color) & Laura McKeeman (Sideline)

Game information

First quarter

- UTEP – 12:09 Nathan Jeffery 24 yd blocked punt return, Dakota Warren XP good (UTEP 7–0)
- OU – 05:06 Kenny Stills 68 yd pass from Landry Jones, Michael Hunnicutt XP good (Tied 7–7)

Third quarter

- OU – 10:05 Michael Hunnicutt 38 yd field goal (OU 10–7)

Fourth quarter

- OU – 10:32 Brannon Green 18 yd pass from Landry Jones, Michael Hunnicutt XP good (OU 17–7)
- OU – 02:55 Damien Williams 65 yd run, Michael Hunnicutt XP good (OU 24–7)

Top passers

- OU – Landry Jones 21/36, 222 yards, 2 TD
- UTEP – Nick Lamaison 6/23, 39 yards

Top rushers

- OU – Damien Wiliams 9 attempts, 104 yards, 1 TD
- UTEP – Nathan Jeffery 21 attempts, 177 yards

Top receivers

- OU – Kenny Stills 6 receptions, 121 yards, 1 TD
- UTEP – Kevin Perry 1 receptions, 13 yards

Top tacklers

- OU – Tony Jefferson 10 tackles
- UTEP – Josh Fely 12 tackles

=== Florida A&M ===
Florida A&M Rattlers at #5 Oklahoma Sooners – Game summary

| Quarter | 1 | 2 | 3 | 4 | Total |
|---|---|---|---|---|---|
| Florida A&M | 0 | 10 | 3 | 0 | 13 |
| #5 Oklahoma | 14 | 21 | 21 | 13 | 69 |

at Gaylord Family Oklahoma Memorial Stadium, Norman, Oklahoma

- Date: September 8
- Game time: 6:09 p.m. CDT
- Game weather: Temperature: 81 °F (27 °C) • Wind: N 12 • Weather: Clear
- Game attendance: 84,852
- Referee: Referee: Reggie Smith • Umpire: Michael Cooper • Linesman: Mike Moeller • Line judge: Kevin Vicknair • Back judge: Corey Luxner • Field judge: Jack G. Taylor III • Side judge: Tim Murray • Scorer: Gary Brown
- TV announcers (FSOK PPV): Bill Land (Play-by-play), Dave Lapham (Color) & Chad McKee (Sideline)

Game information

First quarter

- OU – 07:05 Damien Williams 3 yd run, Michael Hunnicutt XP good (OU 7–0)
- OU – 05:17 Damien Williams 4 yd run, Michael Hunnicutt XP good (OU 14–0)

Second quarter

- FAMU – 10:52 Chase Varnadore 41 yd field goal (OU 14–3)
- OU – 09:20 Damien Williams 15 yd run, Michael Hunnicutt XP good (OU 21–3)
- OU – 05:59 Kenny Stills 16 yd pass from Landry Jones, Michael Hunnicutt XP good (OU 28–3)
- FAMU – 04:26 Travis Harvey 75 yd pass from Damien Flemming, Chase Varnadore XP good (OU 28–10)
- OU – 00:36 Trey Metoyer 18 yd pass from Landry Jones, Michael Hunnicutt XP good (OU 35–10)

Third quarter

- OU – 12:11 Brennan Clay 3 yd run, Michael Hunnicutt XP good (OU 42–10)
- OU – 10:34 Damien Williams 89 yd run, Michael Hunnicutt XP good (OU 49–10)
- OU – 06:49 Brennan Clay 10 yd run, Michael Hunnicutt XP good (OU 56–10)
- FAMU – 02:10 Chase Varnadore 46 yd field goal (OU 56–13)

Fourth quarter

- OU – 13:52 Dominique Whaley 4 yd run, Michael Hunnicutt XP no good (OU 62–13)
- OU – 05:59 Roy Finch 15 yd run, Michael Hunnicutt XP good (OU 69–13)

Top passers

- FAMU – Damien Flemming 11/21, 133 yards, 1 TD, 1 INT
- OU – Landry Jones 19/28, 252 yards, 2 TD, INT

Top rushers

- FAMU – James Owens 6 attempts, 35 yards
- OU – Damien Williams 10 attempts, 156 yards, 4 TD

Top receivers

- FAMU – Travis Harvey 4 receptions, 118 yards, 1 TD
- OU – Kenny Stills 10 receptions, 120 yards, 1 TD

Top tacklers

- FAMU – Jonathan Pillow 13 tackles
- OU – Aaron Franklin 6 tackles

=== Kansas State ===
#15 Kansas State Wildcats at #6 Oklahoma Sooners – Game summary

| Quarter | 1 | 2 | 3 | 4 | Total |
|---|---|---|---|---|---|
| #15 Kansas State | 0 | 10 | 0 | 14 | 24 |
| #6 Oklahoma | 3 | 3 | 7 | 6 | 19 |

at Gaylord Family Oklahoma Memorial Stadium, Norman, Oklahoma

- Date: September 22
- Game time: 6:50 p.m. CDT
- Game weather: Temperature: 88 °F (31 °C) • Wind: NE 12 • Weather: Clear
- Game attendance: 85,276
- Referee: Referee: Tom Walker • Umpire: Kevin Matthews • Linesman: Brad Edwards • Line judge: Kevin Mar • Back judge: Brad Van Vark • Field judge: Scott Gaines • Side judge: Tony Flemming • Scorer: Gary Brown
- TV announcers (FOX): Gus Johnson (Play-by-play), Charles Davis (Color) & Julie Alexandria (Sideline)

Game information

First quarter

- OU – 06:16 Michael Hunnicutt 28 yd field goal (OU 3–0)

Second quarter

- KSU – 12:20 Jarell Childs 1 yd fumble recovery, Anthony Cantele XP good (KSU 7–3)
- KSU – 02:28 Anthony Cantele 23 yd field goal (KSU 10–3)
- OU – 00:35 Michael Hunnicutt 34 yd field goal (KSU 10–6)

Third quarter

- OU – 05:00 Blake Bell 3 yd run, Michael Hunnicutt XP good (OU 13–10)

Fourth quarter

- KSU – 13:16 Collin Klein 5 yd run, Anthony Cantele XP good (KSU 17–13)
- KSU – 07:27 John Hubert 9 yd run, Anthony Cantele XP good (KSU 24–13)
- OU – 04:09 Sterling Shepard 10 yd pass from Landry Jones, Landry Jones pass failed (KSU 24–19)

Top passers

- KSU – Collin Klein 13/21, 149 yards
- OU – Landry Jones 28/43, 298 yards, 1 TD, 1 INT

Top rushers

- KSU – John Hubert 23 attempts, 130 yards, 1 TD
- OU – Dominique Whaley 9 attempts, 51 yards

Top receivers

- KSU – Tramaine Thompson 3 receptions, 49 yards
- OU – Sterling Shepard 7 receptions, 108 yards, 1 TD

Top tacklers

- KSU – Arthur Brown 8 tackles
- OU – Tony Jefferson 14 tackles

=== Texas Tech ===
#17 Oklahoma Sooners at Texas Tech Red Raiders – Game summary

| Quarter | 1 | 2 | 3 | 4 | Total |
|---|---|---|---|---|---|
| #17 Oklahoma | 7 | 17 | 17 | 0 | 41 |
| Texas Tech | 7 | 6 | 0 | 7 | 20 |

at Jones AT&T Stadium, Lubbock, Texas

- Date: October 6
- Game time: 2:35 p.m. CDT
- Game weather: Temperature: 50 °F (10 °C) • Wind: ENE 11 • Weather: Partly Cloudy
- Game attendance: 60,800
- Referee: Referee: Scott Novak • Umpire: Kevin Matthews • Linesman: Doug Moore • Line judge: Frank LeBlanc • Back judge: Lyndon Dixon • Field judge: Nick Lave • Side judge: Shane Standley
- TV announcers (ABC/ESPN2): Sean McDonough (Play-by-play), Chris Spielman (Color) & Quint Kessenich (Sideline)

Game information

First quarter

- OU – 10:59 Justin Brown 13 yd pass from Landry Jones, Michael Hunnicutt XP good (OU 7–0)
- TTU – 07:11 Kenny Williams 7 yd run, Ryan Bustin XP good (Tied 7–7)

Second quarter

- TTU – 14:22 Ryan Bustin 35 yd field goal (TTU 10–7)
- OU – 11:08 Blake Bell 1 yd run, Michael Hunnicutt XP good (OU 14–10)
- TTU – 06:58 Ryan Bustin 43 yd field goal (OU 14–13)
- OU – 03:27 Kenny Stills 13 yd pass from Landry Jones, Michael Hunnicutt XP good (OU 21–13)
- OU – 00:31 Michael Hunnicutt 33 yd field goal (OU 24–13)

Third quarter

- OU – 09:13 Blake Bell 1 yd run, Michael Hunnicutt XP good (OU 31–13)
- OU – 08:40 Javon Harris 46 yard interception return, Michael Hunnicutt XP good (OU 38–13)
- OU – 00:47 Michael Hunnicutt 42 yd field goal (OU 41–13)

Fourth quarter

- TTU – 00:56 SaDale Foster 3 yd run, Ryan Bustin XP good (OU 41–20)

Top passers

- OU – Landry Jones 25/40, 259 yards, 2 TD
- TTU – Seth Doege 22/36, 203 yards, 3 INT

Top rushers

- OU – Damien Williams 14 attempts, 48 yards
- TTU – SaDale Foster 11 attempts, 44 yards, 1 TD

Top receivers

- OU – Damien Williams 6 receptions, 82 yards
- TTU – Darrin Moore 5 receptions, 80 yards

Top tacklers

- OU – Aaron Colvin 6 tackles
- TTU – D. J. Johnson 10 tackles

=== Texas (Red River Rivalry) ===
#15 Texas Longhorns vs. #13 Oklahoma Sooners – Game summary

| Quarter | 1 | 2 | 3 | 4 | Total |
|---|---|---|---|---|---|
| #15 Texas | 2 | 0 | 6 | 13 | 21 |
| #13 Oklahoma | 13 | 23 | 10 | 17 | 63 |

at Cotton Bowl, Dallas

- Date: October 13
- Game time: 11:08 a.m. CDT
- Game weather: Temperature: 77 °F (25 °C) • Wind: S 15 • Weather: Overcast
- Game attendance: 92,500
- Referee: Referee: Mike Defee • Umpire: Michael Cooper • Linesman: Al Green • Line judge: Walt Coleman • Back judge: Terry White • Field judge: Mike Cuttone • Side judge: Eugene Hall • Scorer: Gary Brown
- TV announcers (ABC): Brad Nessler (Play-by-play), Todd Blackledge (Color) & Holly Rowe (Sideline)

Game information

First quarter

- OU – 08:48 Blake Bell 8 yd run, Michael Hunnicutt XP blocked (OU 6–0)
- UT – 08:48 Quandre Diggs PAT return (OU 6–2)
- OU – 04:09 Damien Williams 95 yd run, Michael Hunnicutt XP good (OU 13–2)

Second quarter

- OU – 12:39 Blake Bell 1 yd run, Michael Hunnicutt XP good (OU 20–2)
- OU – 09:41 Blake Bell 1 yd run, Michael Hunnicutt XP good (OU 27–2)
- OU – 06:28 Team safety (OU 29–2)
- OU – 03:28 Blake Bell 1 yd run, Michael Hunnicutt XP good (OU 36–2)

Third quarter

- UT – 12:43 Carrington Byndom 28 yard interception return, Anthony Fera XP no good (OU 36–8)
- OU – 07:42 Michael Hunnicutt 36 yd field goal (OU 39–8)
- OU – 01:25 Trey Millard 25 yd pass from Landry Jones, Michael Hunnicutt XP good (OU 46–8)

Fourth quarter

- OU – 14:02 Michael Hunnicutt 32 yd field goal (OU 49–8)
- OU – 06:41 Justin Brown 14 yd pass from Landry Jones, Michael Hunnicutt XP good (OU 56–8)
- UT – 04:43 Mike Davis 44 yd pass from Case McCoy, Nick Jordan XP good (OU 56–15)
- OU – 02:15 Brennan Clay 1 yd run, Michael Hunnicutt XP good (OU 63–15)
- UT – 00:00 John Harris 19 yd pass from Case McCoy (OU 63–21)

Top passers

- UT – David Ash 13/29, 113 yards, 2 INT
- OU – Landry Jones 21/37, 321 yards, 2 TD, 1 INT

Top rushers

- UT – Daje Johnson 4 attempts, 41 yards
- OU – Damien Williams 22 attempts, 167 yards, 1 TD

Top receivers

- UT – Mike Davis 5 receptions, 89 yards, 1 TD
- OU – Trey Millard 5 receptions, 119 yards, 1 TD

Top tacklers

- UT – Mykke Thompson 12 tackles
- OU – Tony Jefferson 7 tackles

=== Kansas ===
Kansas Jayhawks at #10 Oklahoma Sooners – Game summary

| Quarter | 1 | 2 | 3 | 4 | Total |
|---|---|---|---|---|---|
| Kansas | 0 | 0 | 0 | 7 | 7 |
| #10 Oklahoma | 10 | 28 | 14 | 0 | 52 |

at Gaylord Family Oklahoma Memorial Stadium, Norman, Oklahoma

- Date: October 20
- Game time: 6:05 p.m. CDT
- Game weather: Temperature: 79 °F (26 °C) • Wind: S 13 • Weather: Clear
- Game attendance: 84,532
- Referee: Referee: Greg Burks • Umpire: Scott Campbell • Linesman: Bill Scott • Line judge: Kevin Mar • Back judge: Brian Ernest • Field judge: Randy Smith • Side judge: Gene Semko • Scorer: Gary Brown
- TV announcers (FSN): Joel Meyers (Play-by-play), Brian Baldinger (Color) & Jim Knox (Sideline)

Game information

First quarter

- OU – 07:41 Michael Hunnicutt 37 yd field goal (OU 3–0)
- OU – 03:49 Kenny Stills 44 yd pass from Landry Jones, Michael Hunnicutt XP good (OU 10–0)

Second quarter

- OU – 12:29 Blake Bell 1 yd run, Michael Hunnicutt XP good (OU 17–0)
- OU – 10:04 Justin Brown 90 yd punt return, Michael Hunnicutt XP good (OU 24–0)
- OU – 05:12 Damien Williams 4 yd run, Michael Hunnicutt XP good (OU 31–0)
- OU – 01:12 Sterling Shepard 9 yd pass from Landry Jones, Michael Hunnicutt XP good (OU 38–0)

Third quarter

- OU – 14:47 Roy Finch 100 yd kickoff return, Michael Hunnicutt XP good (OU 45–0)
- OU – 09:53 Trey Millard 25 yd pass from Landry Jones, Michael Hunnicutt XP good (OU 52–0)

Fourth quarter

- KU – 03:11 James Sims 1 yd run, Nick Prolago XP good (OU 52–7)

Top passers

- KU – Micha Cummings 10/21, 111 yards, 2 INT
- OU – Landry Jones 19/28, 291 yards, 3 TD

Top rushers

- KU – James Sims 28 attempts, 102 yards, 1 TD
- OU – Brennan Clay 4 attempts, 47 yards

Top receivers

- KU – James Sims 2 receptions, 56 yards
- OU – Kenny Stills 6 receptions, 90 yards, 1 TD

Top tacklers

- KU – Brad McDougald 8 tackles
- OU – Tony Jefferson 11 tackles

=== Notre Dame ===
#5 Notre Dame Fighting Irish at #8 Oklahoma Sooners – Game summary

| Quarter | 1 | 2 | 3 | 4 | Total |
|---|---|---|---|---|---|
| #5 Notre Dame | 7 | 3 | 0 | 20 | 30 |
| #8 Oklahoma | 3 | 3 | 0 | 7 | 13 |

at Gaylord Family Oklahoma Memorial Stadium, Norman, Oklahoma

- Date: October 27
- Game time: 7:12 p.m. CDT
- Game weather: Temperature: 47 °F (8 °C) • Wind: NNE 3 • Weather: Clear
- Game attendance: 86,013
- Referee: Referee: Jerry McGinn • Umpire: Richard Feeney • Linesman: Kavin McGrath • Line judge: Todd Reese • Back judge: Brian Platt • Field judge: Dan Gallagher • Side judge: Mark Windham • Scorer: Gary Brown
- TV announcers (ABC): Brent Musburger (Play-by-play), Kirk Herbstreit (Color) & Heather Cox (Sideline)

Game information

First quarter

- OU – 07:12 Michael Hunnicutt 28 yd field goal (OU 3–0)
- ND – 06:24 Cierre Wood 62 yd run, Kyle Brindza XP good (ND 7–3)

Second quarter

- ND – 05:54 Kyle Brindza 34 yd field goal (ND 10–3)
- OU – 00:43 Michael Hunnicutt 30 yd field goal (ND 10–6)

Fourth quarter

- ND – 13:57 Kyle Brindza 44 yd field goal (ND 13–6)
- OU – 09:10 Blake Bell 1 yd run, Michael Hunnicutt XP good (Tied 13–13)
- ND – 05:05 Everett Golson 1 yd run, Kyle Brindza XP good (ND 20–13)
- ND – 03:22 Kyle Brindza 46 yd field goal (ND 23–13)
- ND – 01:36 Theo Riddick 15 yd run, Kyle Brindza XP good (ND 30–13)

Top passers

- ND – Everett Golson 13/25, 177 yards
- OU – Landry Jones 35/51, 356 yards, 1 INT

Top rushers

- ND – Theo Riddick 19 attempts, 74 yards, 1 TD
- OU – Damien Williams 13 attempts, 29 yards

Top receivers

- ND – T. J. Jones 5 receptions, 55 yards
- OU – Jalen Saunders 15 receptions, 181 yards

Top tacklers

- ND – Manti Te'o 11 tackles
- OU – Tony Jefferson 11 tackles

=== Iowa State ===
#14 Oklahoma Sooners at Iowa State Cyclones – Game summary

| Quarter | 1 | 2 | 3 | 4 | Total |
|---|---|---|---|---|---|
| #14 Oklahoma | 0 | 14 | 14 | 7 | 35 |
| Iowa State | 0 | 6 | 7 | 7 | 20 |

at Jack Trice Stadium, Ames, Iowa

- Date: November 3
- Game time: 11:07 a.m. CDT
- Game weather: Temperature: 45 °F (7 °C) • Wind: NNE 0–5 • Weather: Mostly Sunny
- Game attendance: 56,585
- Referee: Referee: Tom Walker • Umpire: Scott Teifer • Linesman: Al Green • Line judge: David Oliver • Back judge: Terry White • Field judge: Scott Gaines • Side judge: Tony Flemming • Scorer: Shuey/Pope
- TV announcers (ABC): Mike Patrick (Play-by-play), Ed Cunningham (Color) & Jeannine Edwards (Sideline)

Game information

Second quarter

- OU – 10:00 Sterling Shepard 20 yd pass from Landry Jones, Michael Hunnicutt XP good (OU 7–0)
- ISU – 04:10 Edwin Arceo 27 yd field goal (OU 7–3)
- ISU – 01:04 Edwin Arceo 51 yd field goal (OU 7–6)
- OU – 00:14 Kenny Stills 21 yd pass from Landry Jones, Michael Hunnicutt XP good (OU 14–6)

Third quarter

- OU – 08:52 Justin Brown 20 yd pass from Landry Jones, Michael Hunnicutt XP good (OU 21–6)
- ISU – 05:49 Jarvis West 19 yd run, Edwin Arceo XP good (OU 21–13)
- OU – 02:04 Brennan Clay 18 yd run, Michael Hunnicutt XP good (OU 28–13)

Fourth quarter

- OU – 10:59 Kenny Stills 31 yd pass from Landry Jones, Michael Hunnicutt XP good (OU 35–13)
- ISU – 06:32 Shontrelle Johnson 2 yd run, Edwin Arceo XP good (OU 35–20)

Top passers

- OU – Landry Jones 32/45, 405 yards, 4 TD, 2 INT
- ISU – Steele Jantz 13/25, 177 yards

Top rushers

- OU – Brennan Clay 24 attempts, 157 yards, 1 TD
- ISU – Shontrelle Johnson 7 attempts, 28 yards, 1 TD

Top receivers

- OU – Justin Brown 7 receptions, 107 yards, 1 TD
- ISU – Quenton Bundrage 4 receptions, 44 yards

Top tacklers

- OU – Tony Jefferson 9 tackles
- ISU – Jeremiah George 17 tackles

=== Baylor ===
Baylor Bears at #14 Oklahoma Sooners – Game summary

| Quarter | 1 | 2 | 3 | 4 | Total |
|---|---|---|---|---|---|
| Baylor | 3 | 14 | 9 | 8 | 34 |
| #14 Oklahoma | 14 | 14 | 7 | 7 | 42 |

at Gaylord Family Oklahoma Memorial Stadium, Norman, Oklahoma

- Date: November 10
- Game time: 2:30 p.m. CST
- Game weather: Temperature: 73 °F (23 °C) • Wind: S 26 • Weather: Partly Cloudy
- Game attendance: 84,945
- Referee: Referee: Reggie Smith • Umpire: Michael Cooper • Linesman: Mike Moeller • Line judge: Kevin Vicknair • Back judge: Brad Van Ark • Field judge: Jack G. Taylor III • Side judge: Tim Murray • Scorer: Gary Brown
- TV announcers (FSN): Steve Physioc (Play-by-play), J. C. Pearson (Color) & Laura McKeeman (Sideline)

Game information

First quarter

- OU – 09:58 Brennan Clay 5 yd pass from Landry Jones, Michael Hunnicutt XP good (OU 7–0)
- BAY – 08:20 Aaron Jones 58 yd field goal (OU 7–3)
- OU – 02:55 Brennan Clay 1 yd run, Michael Hunnicutt XP good (OU 14–3)

Second quarter

- BAY – 09:38 Nick Florence 5 yd run, Aaron Jones XP good (OU 14–10)
- OU – 06:17 Damien Williams 3 yd run, Michael Hunnicutt XP good (OU 21–10)
- BAY – 00:32 Lache Seastrunk 4 yd run, Aaron Jones XP good (OU 21–17)
- OU – 00:15 Justin Brown 35 yd pass from Landry Jones, Michael Hunnicutt XP good (OU 28–17)

Third quarter

- BAY – 12:21 Aaron Jones 21 yd field goal (OU 28–20)
- BAY – 07:42 Lache Seastrunk 2 yd run, Jarred Salubi rush fumbled (OU 28–26)
- OU – 02:10 Damien Williams 17 yd run, Michael Hunnicutt XP good (OU 35–26)

Fourth quarter

- OU – 14:14 Blake Bell 55 yd run, Michael Hunnicutt XP good (OU 42–26)
- BAY – 01:26 Lache Seastrunk 6 yd run, Nick Florence rush (OU 42–34)

Top passers

- BAY – Nick Florence 12/33, 172 yards
- OU – Landry Jones 25/36, 277 yards, 2 TD, 1 INT

Top rushers

- BAY – Lache Seastrunk 15 attempts, 91 yards, 3 TD
- OU – Damien Williams 23 attempts, 99 yards, 2 TD

Top receivers

- BAY – Terrance Williams 6 receptions, 91 yards
- OU – Justin Brown 6 receptions, 83 yards, 1 TD

Top tacklers

- BAY – Bryce Hager 16 tackles
- OU – Javon Harris 14 tackles

=== West Virginia ===
#13 Oklahoma Sooners at West Virginia Mountaineers – Game summary

| Quarter | 1 | 2 | 3 | 4 | Total |
|---|---|---|---|---|---|
| #13 Oklahoma | 10 | 21 | 7 | 12 | 50 |
| West Virginia | 3 | 14 | 13 | 19 | 49 |

at Mountaineer Field, Morgantown, West Virginia

- Date: November 17
- Game time: 7:06 p.m. EST
- Game weather: Temperature: 45 °F (7 °C) • Wind: ESE 5 • Weather: Clear
- Game attendance: 50,238
- Referee: Referee: Greg Burks • Umpire: Scott Campbell • Linesman: George Gusman • Line judge: Kevin Mar • Back judge: Brian Ernest • Field judge: Randy Smith • Side judge: Gene Semko • Scorer: Mark DeVault
- TV announcers (FOX): Craig Bolerjack (Play-by-play), Joel Klatt (Color) & Petros Papadakis (Sideline)

Game information

First quarter

- OU – 11:01 Trey Millard 4 yd pass from Landry Jones, Michael Hunnicutt XP good (OU 7–0)
- OU – 04:58 Michael Hunnicutt 32 yd field goal (OU 10–0)
- WVU – 01:28 Tyler Bitancurt 19 yd field goal (OU 10–3)

Second quarter

- WVU – 10:00 Andrew Buie 1 yd run, Tyler Bitancurt XP good (Tied 10–10)
- OU – 09:35 Jalen Saunders 76 yd pass from Landry Jones, Michael Hunnicutt XP good (OU 17–10)
- OU – 05:16 Kenny Stills 4 yd pass from Landry Jones, Michael Hunnicutt XP good (OU 24–10)
- WVU – 03:38 Stedman Bailey 33 yd pass from Geno Smith, Tyler Bitancurt XP good (OU 24–17)
- OU – 02:13 Damien Williams 48 yd run, Michael Hunnicutt XP good (OU 31–17)

Second quarter

- WVU – 14:16 Tavon Austin 74 yd run, Tyler Bitancurt XP good (OU 31–24)
- OU – 11:54 Kenny Stills 11 yd pass from Landry Jones, Michael Hunnicutt XP good (OU 38–24)
- WVU – 05:46 Tavon Austin 4 yd run, Tyler Bitancurt XP no good (OU 38–30)

Fourth quarter

- WVU – 11:22 Stedman Bailey 4 yd pass from Geno Smith, Geno Smith pass failed (OU 38–36)
- WVU – 07:12 Stedman Bailey 8 yd pass from Geno Smith, Tyler Bitancurt XP good (WVU 43–38)
- OU – 04:10 Kenny Stills 7 yd pass from Landry Jones, Landry Jones pass failed (OU 44–43)
- WVU – 02:53 Stedman Bailey 40 yd pass from Geno Smith, Geno Smith rush failed (WVU 49–44)
- OU – 00:24 Kenny Stills 5 yd pass from Landry Jones, Landry Jones pass failed (OU 50–49)

Top passers

- OU – Landry Jones 38/51, 554 yards, 6 TD, 1 INT
- WVU – Geno Smith 20/35, 320 yards, 4 TD, 2 INT

Top rushers

- OU – Damien Williams 22 attempts, 92 yards, 1 TD
- WVU – Tavon Austin 21 attempts, 344 yards, 2 TD

Top receivers

- OU – Jalen Saunders 7 receptions, 123 yards, 1 TD
- WVU – Stedman Bailey 13 receptions, 205 yards, 4 TD

Top tacklers

- OU – Tony Jefferson 12 tackles
- WVU – Darwin Cook 10 tackles

=== Oklahoma State (Bedlam Series) ===
#22 Oklahoma State Cowboys at #14 Oklahoma Sooners – Game summary

| Quarter | 1 | 2 | 3 | 4 | OT | Total |
|---|---|---|---|---|---|---|
| #22 Oklahoma State | 14 | 10 | 14 | 7 | 3 | 48 |
| #14 Oklahoma | 3 | 21 | 6 | 15 | 6 | 51 |

at Gaylord Family Oklahoma Memorial Stadium, Norman, Oklahoma

- Date: November 24
- Game time: 2:35 p.m. CST
- Game weather: Temperature: 56 °F (13 °C) • Wind: SSW 17 • Weather: Clear
- Game attendance: 85,824
- Referee: Referee: Scott Novak • Umpire: Kevin Matthews • Linesman: George Gusman • Line judge: Frank LeBlanc • Back judge: Brad Van Vark • Field judge: Scott Gaines • Side judge: Gene Semko • Scorer: Gary Brown
- TV announcers (ESPN): Bob Wischusen (Play-by-play), Danny Kanell (Color) & Maria Taylor (Sideline)

Game information

First quarter

- OSU – 07:28 Joseph Randle 1 yd run, Quinn Sharp XP good (OSU 7–0)
- OSU – 05:26 Joseph Randle 3 yd run, Quinn Sharp XP good (OSU 14–0)
- OU – 00:13 Michael Hunnicutt 25 yd field goal (OSU 14–3)

Second quarter

- OSU – 11:19 Quinn Sharp 42 yd field goal (OSU 17–3)
- OU – 06:53 Trey Millard 14 yd pass from Landry Jones, Michael Hunnicutt XP good (OSU 17–10)
- OU – 02:42 Jalen Saunders 9 yd pass from Landry Jones, Michael Hunnicutt XP good (Tied 17–17)
- OSU – 01:23 Joseph Randle 4 yd run, Quinn Sharp XP good (OSU 24–17)
- OU – 00:13 Kenny Stills 15 yd pass from Landry Jones, Michael Hunnicutt XP good (Tied 24–24)

Third quarter

- OSU – 14:48 Josh Stewart 75 yd pass from Clint Chelf, Quinn Sharp XP good (OSU 31–24)
- OU – 12:00 Michael Hunnicutt 45 yd field goal (OSU 31–27)
- OSU – 04:17 Joseph Randle 7 yd run, Quinn Sharp XP good (OSU 38–27)
- OU – 01:22 Michael Hunnicutt 30 yd field goal (OSU 38–30)

Fourth quarter

- OU – 14:36 Jalen Saunders 81 yd punt return, Justin Brown pass from Landry Jones (Tied 38–38)
- OSU – 10:41 J. W. Walsh 2 yd run, Quinn Sharp XP good (OSU 45–38)
- OU – 00:04 Blake Bell 4 yd run, Michael Hunnicutt XP good (Tied 45–45)

Overtime

- OSU – Quinn Sharp 26 yd field goal (OSU 48–45)
- OU – Brennan Clay 18 yd run (OU 51–48)

Top passers

- OSU – Clint Chelf 19/37, 253 yards, 1 TD, 1 INT
- OU – Landry Jones 46/71, 500 yards, 3 TD, 1 INT

Top rushers

- OSU – Joseph Randle 21 attempts, 113 yards, 4 TD
- OU – Brennan Clay 13 attempts, 59 yards, 1 TD

Top receivers

- OSU – Josh Stewart 11 receptions, 150 yards, 1 TD
- OU – Jalen Saunders 10 receptions, 162 yards, 1 TD

Top tacklers

- OSU – Justin Gilbert 11 tackles
- OU – Tony Jefferson 14 tackles

=== TCU ===
#12 Oklahoma Sooners at TCU Horned Frogs – Game summary

| Quarter | 1 | 2 | 3 | 4 | Total |
|---|---|---|---|---|---|
| #12 Oklahoma | 7 | 7 | 10 | 0 | 24 |
| TCU | 0 | 7 | 7 | 3 | 17 |

at Amon G. Carter Stadium, Fort Worth, Texas

- Date: December 1
- Game time: 11:01 a.m. CST
- Game weather: Temperature: 73 °F (23 °C) • Wind: S 15 • Weather: Cloudy
- Game attendance: 47,501
- Referee: Referee: Rick Loumiet • Umpire: Rick Podraza • Linesman: Cal McNeill • Line judge: David Oliver • Back judge: Donnie Aultman • Field judge: Jack G. Taylor III • Side judge: Tony Flemming • Scorer: Ben Dobson
- TV announcers (ESPN): Joe Tessitore (Play-by-play), Matt Millen (Color) & Shannon Spake (Sideline)

Game information

First quarter

- OU – 00:36 Damien Williams 11 yd pass from Landry Jones, Michael Hunnicutt XP good (OU 7–0)

Second quarter

- TCU – 03:46 Trevone Boykin 6 yd run, Jaden Oberkrom XP good (Tied 7–7)
- OU – 00:53 Jalen Saunders 24 yd pass from Landry Jones, Michael Hunnicutt XP good (OU 14–7)

Third quarter

- OU – 13:49 Damien Williams 66 yd run, Michael Hunnicutt XP good (OU 21–7)
- TCU – 09:33 Brandon Carter 80 yd pass from Trevone Boykin, Jaden Oberkrom XP good (OU 21–14)
- OU – 02:18 Michael Hunnicutt 34 yd field goal (OU 24–14)

Fourth quarter

- TCU – 07:00 Jaden Oberkrom 47 yd field goal (OU 24–17)

Top passers

- OU – Landry Jones 22/40, 244 yards, 2 TD, 1 INT
- TCU – Trevone Boykin 17/31, 231 yards, 1 TD

Top rushers

- OU – Damien Williams 18 attempts, 115 yards, 1 TD
- TCU – B. J. Catalon 11 attempts, 51 yards

Top receivers

- OU – Jalen Saunders 7 receptions, 108 yards, 1 TD
- TCU – Brandon Carter 1 reception, 80 yards, 1 TD

Top tacklers

- OU – Tony Jefferson 8 tackles
- TCU – Chris Hackett 11 tackles

=== Texas A&M (Cotton Bowl) ===
#10 Texas A&M Aggies vs. #12 Oklahoma Sooners – Game summary

| Quarter | 1 | 2 | 3 | 4 | Total |
|---|---|---|---|---|---|
| #10 Texas A&M | 7 | 7 | 20 | 7 | 41 |
| #12 Oklahoma | 3 | 10 | 0 | 0 | 13 |

at Cowboys Stadium, Arlington, Texas

- Date: January 4
- Game time: 7:10 p.m. CST
- Game weather: Indoors
- Game attendance: 87,025
- Referee: Referee: Tom Zimorski • Umpire: Keith Roden • Linesman: Tyrone Davis • Line judge: Jack Weiland • Back judge: Barry Hendon • Field judge: Chris Brown • Side judge: Darrell Harrison • Scorer: Blythe McPhail
- TV announcers (FOX): Gus Johnson (Play-by-play), Charles Davis (Color) & Julie Alexandria (Sideline)

Game information

First quarter

- TAMU – 12:21 Johnny Manziel 23 yd run, Taylor BertoletXP good (TAMU 7–0)
- OU – 06:38 Michael Hunnicutt 23 yd field goal (TAMU 7–3)

Second quarter

- OU – 11:41 Michael Hunnicutt 24 yd field goal (TAMU 7–6)
- TAMU – 06:14 Johnny Manziel 5 yd run, Taylor BertoletXP good (TAMU 14–6)
- OU – 01:16 Justin Brown 6 yd pass from Landry Jones, Michael Hunnicutt XP good (TAMU 14–13)

Third quarter

- TAMU – 10:26 Ben Malena 7 yd run, Taylor BertoletXP good (TAMU 21–13)
- TAMU – 06:30 Trey Williams 30 yd run, Taylor Bertolet XP no good (TAMU 27–13)
- TAMU – 03:55 Ryan Swope 33 yd pass from Johnny Manziel, Taylor Bertolet XP good (TAMU 34–13)

Fourth quarter

- TAMU – 09:03 Uzoma Nwachukwu 34 yd pass from Johnny Manziel, Taylor Bertolet XP good (TAMU 41–13)

Top passers

- TAMU – Johnny Manziel 22/34, 287 yards, 2 TD, 1 INT
- OU – Landry Jones 35/48, 278 yards, 1 TD, 1 INT

Top rushers

- TAMU – Johnny Manziel 17 attempts, 229 yards, 2 TD
- OU – Brennan Clay 10 attempts, 44 yards

Top receivers

- TAMU – Ryan Swope 8 receptions, 104 yards, 1 TD
- OU – Kenny Stills 7 receptions, 67 yards

Top tacklers

- TAMU – Dustin Harris 10 tackles
- OU – Aaron Colvin 9 tackles

== Rankings ==
Ranking movements Legend: ██ Increase in ranking ██ Decrease in ranking ( ) = First-place votes
| | Week | | | | | | | | | | | | | | | |
| Poll | Pre | 1 | 2 | 3 | 4 | 5 | 6 | 7 | 8 | 9 | 10 | 11 | 12 | 13 | 14 | Final |
|---|---|---|---|---|---|---|---|---|---|---|---|---|---|---|---|---|
| AP | 4 (1) | 5 | 5 | 6 | 16 | 17 | 13 | 10 | 8 | 14 | 14 | 13 | 14 | 12 | 12 | 15 |
| Coaches | 4 (1) | 5 | 5 | 5 | 15 | 14 | 10 | 7 | 7 | 12 | 13 | 12 | 13 | 11 | 11 | 15 |
| Harris | Not released | | | | | | 13 | 9 | 7 | 12 | 13 | 12 | 13 | 11 | 11 | Not released |
| BCS | Not released | | | | | | | 9 | 8 | 12 | 12 | 12 | 13 | 11 | 11 | Not released |

== Statistics ==
=== Team ===
| | Team | Opp |
|---|---|---|
| Points per game | 38.2 | 25.5 |
| First downs | 353 | 250 |
| Rushing | 114 | 111 |
| Passing | 224 | 120 |
| Penalty | 15 | 19 |
| Rushing yardage | 2,098 | 2,499 |
| Rushing attempts | 434 | 484 |
| Avg per rush | 4.8 | 5.2 |
| Avg per game | 161.4 | 192.2 |
| Passing Yardage | 4,374 | 2,679 |
| Avg per game | 336.5 | 206.1 |
| Completions-Attempts | 376-571 (65.8%) | 220-420 (52.4%) |
| Total offense | 6,472 | 5,178 |
| Total plays | 1,005 | 905 |
| Avg per play | 6.4 | 5.7 |
| Avg per game | 497.8 | 398.3 |
| Fumbles-Lost | 20-9 | 7-3 |

| | Team | Opp |
|---|---|---|
| Punts-Yards | 54-2,340 (43.3 avg) | 74-3,227 (43.6 avg) |
| Punt returns-Total yards | 27-387 (14.3 avg) | 12-87 (7.3 avg) |
| Kick returns-Total yards | 35-904 (25.8 avg) | 57-1,040 (18.2 avg) |
| Onside kicks | 0-0 | 0-2 (0%) |
| Avg time of possession per game | 31:04 | 28:56 |
| Penalties-Yards | 74-598 | 62-482 |
| Avg per game | 46 | 37.1 |
| 3rd down conversions | 96/184 (52.2%) | 84/202 (41.6%) |
| 4th down conversions | 7/11 (63.6%) | 7/15 (46.7%) |
| Sacks by-Yards | 25-138 | 15-128 |
| Total TDs | 64 | 41 |
| Rushing | 30 | 27 |
| Passing | 30 | 11 |
| Field goals-Attempts | 17-21 (81%) | 16-22 (72.7%) |
| PAT-Attempts | 57-59 (96.6%) | 33-36 (91.7%) |
| Total attendance | 511,460 | 255,261 |
| Games-Avg per game | 6-85,243 | 5-51,052 |

=== Scores by quarter ===
| | 1 | 2 | 3 | 4 | OT | Total |
|---|---|---|---|---|---|---|
| Opponents | 50 | 87 | 79 | 112 | 3 | 331 |
| Oklahoma | 94 | 182 | 116 | 98 | 6 | 496 |

== Post Season ==
=== All Big 12 team ===
A number of Sooners were named to the All Big 12 Team.

First Team
- Trey Millard, Jr., FB, 2nd year
- Gabe Ikard, Jr., OL, 2nd year
- Aaron Colvin, Jr., DB
- Tony Jefferson, Jr., DB

Second Team
- Damien Williams, Jr., RB
- Lane Johnson, Sr., OL
- David King, Sr., DL
- Demontre Hurst, Sr., DB, 2nd year

Honorable Mention
- Justin Brown, Sr., WR
- Landry Jones, Sr., QB
- Tress Way, Sr., P
- Daryl Williams, So., OL
- Gabe Ikard, Jr., OL (offensive lineman of the year)
- Sterling Shepard, Fr., WR (offensive freshman of the year)
- Damien Williams, Jr., RB (offensive newcomer of the year)

=== 2013 NFL draft ===
The 2013 NFL draft was held on April 25–27, 2013 at Radio City Music Hall in New York City. The following Oklahoma players were either selected or signed as free agents following the draft.

| Player | Position | Round | Overall pick | NFL team |
|---|---|---|---|---|
| Lane Johnson | OT | 1st | 4 | Philadelphia Eagles |
| Landry Jones | QB | 4th | 115 | Pittsburgh Steelers |
| Kenny Stills | WR | 5th | 144 | New Orleans Saints |
| Justin Brown | WR | 6th | 186 | Pittsburgh Steelers |
| Stacy McGee | DT | 6th | 205 | Oakland Raiders |
| David King | DE | 7th | 239 | Philadelphia Eagles |
| Tony Jefferson | FS | Undrafted | | Arizona Cardinals |
| Dominique Whaley | RB | Undrafted | | Seattle Seahawks |
| Casey Walker | DT | Undrafted | | Carolina Panthers |
| Tom Wort | MLB | Undrafted | | Tennessee Titans |
| Tress Way | P | Undrafted | | Chicago Bears |
| Demontre Hurst | DB | Undrafted | | Chicago Bears |
| Javon Harris | DB | Undrafted | | Arizona Cardinals |
| Jamarkus McFarland | DT | Undrafted | | San Diego Chargers |
| James Winchester | LS | Undrafted | | Green Bay Packers |
| R.J. Washington | DE | Undrafted | | St. Louis Rams |
