= 2013 Cotton Bowl Classic =

2013 AT&T Cotton Bowl Classic
- 77th Cotton Bowl Classic
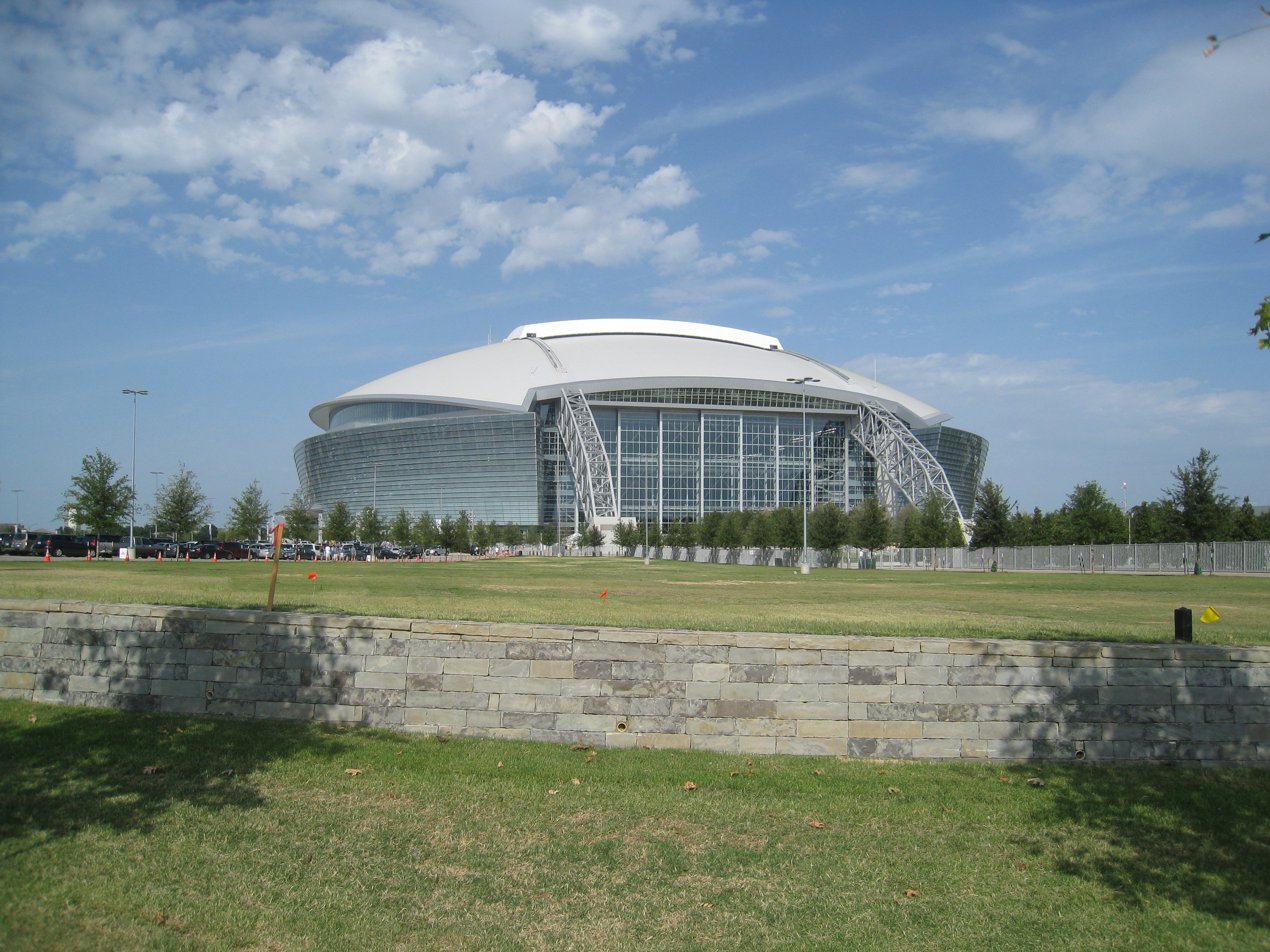
- Cowboys Stadium in Arlington, Texas, hosted the Cotton Bowl Classic.
Texas A&M Aggies	Oklahoma Sooners
(10–2)	(10–2)
SEC	Big 12
41	13
Head coach: Kevin Sumlin	Head coach: Bob Stoops
AP / Coaches / BCS; 10 / 9 / 9	AP / Coaches / BCS; 12 / 11 / 11
	1	2	3	4	Total
Texas A&M	7	7	20	7	41
Oklahoma	3	10	0	0	13
- Date: January 4, 2013
- Season: 2012
- Stadium: Cowboys Stadium
- Location: Arlington, Texas
- MVP: Offensive: Johnny Manziel (QB – Texas A&M); Defensive: Dustin Harris (DB – Texas A&M)
- Favorite: Texas A&M by 3
- Referee: Tom Zimorski (ACC)
- Attendance: 87,025
- Payout: US$7.25 million

United States TV coverage
- Network: FOX; Fox Deportes
- Announcers: Gus Johnson (play-by-play); Charles Davis (commentary); Julie Alexandria (sideline reporter); Petros Papadakis (sideline reporter)
- Nielsen ratings: 7.5 (11.2 million viewers)

The 2013 AT&T Cotton Bowl Classic was a post-season American college football bowl game held on January 4, 2013, at Cowboys Stadium in Arlington, Texas in the United States. The 77th edition of the Cotton Bowl Classic began at 7:00 p.m. CST and aired on Fox Sports. It featured the Texas A&M Aggies from the Southeastern Conference (SEC) against the Big 12 Conference co-champion Oklahoma Sooners and was the final game of the 2012 NCAA Division I FBS football season for both teams. Both the Aggies and the Sooners accepted their invitations after finishing the regular season 10–2.

The pre-game buildup was primarily focused on the two high-powered offenses, both of whom were led by strong passing attacks led by quarterbacks Johnny Manziel and Landry Jones respectively. Both teams also had several quality wide receivers, but both were average to below average defensively. Experts were split in their prognostications, but most predicted a high-scoring game.

Texas A&M defeated Oklahoma 41–13 to win the Cotton Bowl Classic and to finish the season with an 11–2 record. Manziel rushed for 229 yards during the game, a bowl record, rushing for two touchdowns and throwing for two more. Though the halftime score was 14–13 Texas A&M, the Aggies went on to score 27 unanswered second half points to win the game.

== Teams ==
=== Oklahoma ===
With an 8–1 conference record, the Sooners once again won a share of the Big 12 Championship; however, their loss to the Kansas State Wildcats prevented them from reaching the 2013 Fiesta Bowl spot. In addition, the non-AQ Northern Illinois Huskies completed the qualifications to go to the 2013 Orange Bowl, leaving the Sooners out of the Bowl Championship Series (BCS).

This was the Sooners' second Cotton Bowl; they had won the 2002 game, defeating the Arkansas Razorbacks by a score of 10–3. The Sooners were the first team since Florida in 1993 to play against the teams with the top 3 Heisman vote-getters for that season (having played against 3rd-place finisher Collin Klein from Kansas State, runner-up Manti Te'o from Notre Dame, and Heisman winner Manziel from Texas A&M); they lost to all three.

=== Texas A&M ===
The Aggies' first season as members of the SEC was led by freshman quarterback and 2012 Heisman Trophy winner Manziel, the Aggies posted a 6–2 conference record (10–2 overall), good for a second-place tie in the SEC West Division (tied with the LSU Tigers). In perhaps their biggest game of the season, the Aggies defeated defending national champions and 2013 BCS National Championship Game participants the Alabama Crimson Tide in Tuscaloosa, 29–24.

This was the Aggies' thirteenth Cotton Bowl appearance; with the win they hold a 5–8 record in the game. With the appearance the Aggies became the first program to participate in the Cotton Bowl as members of three different conferences with automatic Cotton Bowl tie-ins (the Southwest Conference, the Big 12, and the SEC).

== Pre-game buildup ==
Coming into the game, much of the buildup surrounded the matchup of two top-flight quarterbacks, senior Landry Jones for Oklahoma and Heisman Trophy winner freshman Johnny Manziel for Texas A&M, both of whom ranked in the top-15 nationally in passing yards. In the all-time series between the two schools, Oklahoma had won 19 games to Texas A&M's 11. This was the teams' first meeting since Texas A&M left the Big 12 for the SEC. Aggies coach Kevin Sumlin had been an assistant under Bob Stoops; coming into the game Stoops was 13–4 against his former assistants.

=== Oklahoma ===
Oklahoma compiled a 10 win, 2 loss record during the regular season and was left out of the BCS for the second consecutive year.

==== Offense ====
Oklahoma's offense was led by their senior quarterback Jones who was primarily responsible for the Sooners' 224 passing first downs, which was best in the country, and their 52.2 third down conversion success rate, which was fourth-best in the country. Jones, a senior who was ranked by ESPN as the number five quarterback prospect for the 2013 NFL draft, completed 66% of his 555 passes totaling 4267 yards, which was second-best in the country, and 30 touchdowns. Jones threw primarily to a trio of upperclassmen wide receivers each of whom ended the season with more than 800 receiving yards, junior Kenny Stills, junior Jalen Saunders, who transferred in the offseason from Fresno State, and senior Justin Brown, who transferred to the Sooners in the offseason amid sanctions from the NCAA in wake of the Penn State child sex abuse scandal. Oklahoma's rushing attack, which was second-worst in the Big 12 in terms of total yards, was led by juniors Damien Williams and Brennan Clay, who amassed 946 yards and 11 touchdowns and 555 yards and 6 touchdowns respectively.

==== Defense ====
Oklahoma's defense improved after head coach Bob Stoops' brother, former Sooners co-defensive coordinator and defensive backs coach Mike Stoops, returned to Oklahoma as the defensive coordinator after having served the previous seven and a half seasons as head coach of the Arizona Wildcats where he totaled 41 wins and 50 losses and was fired midway through the 2011 season. Oklahoma's defense was led in tackles by safety Tony Jefferson, who recorded 113 becoming just the sixth Sooner defensive back ever to amass more than 100. In addition to Jefferson, Oklahoma was represented by defensive back Aaron Colvin on the All-Big 12 first team and defensive lineman David King and defensive back Demontre Hurst on the second team.

=== Texas A&M ===
It was announced on December 12, 2012, that Texas A&M's offensive coordinator Kliff Kingsbury had left the university for the head coaching position at his alma mater, Texas Tech. Consequently, coach Kevin Sumlin announced that running backs coach and recruiting coordinator Clarence McKinney would call plays during the bowl.

==== Offense ====
The Aggies' offense averaged 44.8 points per game, third in the Football Bowl Subdivision (FBS). A&M's offense was led in both passing and rushing by Heisman Trophy winning quarterback Johnny Manziel. Manziel threw primarily to two receivers, fellow redshirt freshman Mike Evans, who totaled 82 receptions for 1105 yards and 5 touchdowns, and senior Ryan Swope, who totaled 72 receptions for 913 yards and 8 touchdowns. Together, the duo combined for 45 percent of the Aggies' targets, catching 139 of 199 passes for 1,845 yards and 12 touchdowns. Aside from Manziel, junior Ben Malena amassed 808 rushing yards and 8 touchdowns, while senior Christine Michael scored 8 rushing touchdowns to go along with 417 rushing yards. The Aggies also had two projected first-round draft picks on their offensive line, junior tackles Luke Joeckel and Jake Matthews.

==== Defense ====
The Aggies' defense was led by first-year defensive coordinator Mark Snyder, who had been a head coach at Marshall and defensive coordinator for Ohio State. Their leading tackler was junior defensive lineman Damontre Moore, who achieved first-team All-SEC accolades during the regular season and declared early to enter the 2013 NFL draft, where he is considered one of the top prospects, and was the second overall pick in Todd McShay's initial mock draft.

== Game summary ==
=== First quarter ===
Texas A&M got the ball to start the game and marched down the field on an 8-play, 75-yard drive that culminated in the first of Manziel's two rushing touchdowns, the first of which went for 23 yards. Oklahoma took over at their own 25 yard line after a touchback on the kickoff. Jones was 6/8 for 43 yards passing on the drive. The Sooners got as far as second and goal at the one yard line prior to two failed plays and a false start penalty that set up a 23-yard field goal to make the score 7–3 Texas A&M. The drive totaled 16 plays and 69 yards in 5:43. On the ensuing drive, Texas A&M was forced to punt after achieving only one first down.

=== Second quarter ===
Oklahoma's next drive ran 18 plays and 87 yards taking up 7:26. Once again, the Sooners stalled in the red zone and were again forced to settle for a field goal, this time a 24-yarder by Michael Hunnicutt. The next two drives by Texas A&M and Oklahoma both ended in interceptions thrown by Manziel and Jones respectively. Texas A&M took over at the Oklahoma 48 yard line following Jones' interception. A trick play to start the drive resulted in senior wide receiver Kenric McNeal throwing a 20-yard pass to Mike Evans. On the next play, running back Ben Malena running the ball 23 yards to the five yard line. Manziel ran for a 5-yard touchdown on the next play to make the score 14–6. Oklahoma's next drive lasted 13 plays and 83 yards that culminated in a 6-yard touchdown pass from Jones to Justin Brown.

=== Third quarter ===
Oklahoma's first second-half drive resulted in a quick three-and-out. After a 58-yard punt by Tress Way which was downed at the Texas A&M 9-yard line. Despite the poor field position, the Aggies put together a 7-play, 91-yard drive highlighted by a 35-yard pass from Manziel to Uzoma Nwachukwu and finished with a 7-yard touchdown run by Malena. Oklahoma had another three-and-out on their next drive. Texas A&M subsequently established a 7-play, 89-yard drive that featured three consecutive completed passes from Manziel to Malcome Kennedy and concluded with a 30-yard rushing touchdown by Trey Williams. Oklahoma's next drive was their third consecutive three-and-out. Texas A&M then scored their third consecutive touchdown, this time on a 33-yard pass from Manziel to Ryan Swope making the score 34–13. Oklahoma then ran a 7-play, 31-yard drive before punting to end the quarter.

=== Fourth quarter ===
Texas A&M had their first three-and-out of the game to begin the fourth quarter. Oklahoma achieved one first down on their subsequent drive before turning the ball over on downs. Texas A&M scored for the final time of the game on their ensuing drive via a 34-yard touchdown pass from Manziel to Nwachukwu to make the score 41–13. Oklahoma and Texas A&M then exchanged punts before the final drive of the game by Oklahoma which lasted four plays prior to time running out.

== Scoring summary ==
Scoring summary

Quarter	Time	Drive			Team	Scoring information	Score	
Quarter	Time	Plays	Yards	TOP	Team	Scoring information	Texas A&M	Oklahoma
1	12:21	8	75	2:39	A&M	Johnny Manziel 23-yard touchdown run, Taylor Bertolet kick good	7	0
1	6:38	16	69	5:43	OKLA	23-yard field goal by Michael Hunnicutt	7	3
2	11:41	18	87	7:26	OKLA	24-yard field goal by Michael Hunnicutt	7	6
2	6:14	3	48	0:43	A&M	Manziel 5-yard touchdown run, Bertolet kick good	14	6
2	1:16	13	83	4:58	OKLA	Justin Brown 6-yard touchdown reception from Landry Jones, Hunnicutt kick good	14	13
3	10:26	7	91	2:51	A&M	Ben Malena 7-yard touchdown run, Bertolet kick good	21	13
3	6:30	7	89	2:27	A&M	Trey Williams 30-yard touchdown run, Bertolet kick no good	27	13
3	3:55	6	71	1:16	A&M	Ryan Swope 33-yard touchdown reception from Manziel, Bertolet kick good	34	13
4	9:03	7	73	3:00	A&M	Uzoma Nwachukwu 34-yard touchdown reception from Manziel, Bertolet kick good	41	13
"TOP" = time of possession. For other American football terms, see Glossary of American football.							41	13

=== Statistics ===
==== Team statistics ====
Statistics	TA&M	OKLA
First downs	28	27
Total offense, plays – yards	66–633	83–401
Rushes-yards (net)	31–326	34–123
Passing yards (net)	307	278
Passes, Comp-Att-Int	23–35–1	35–49–1
Time of Possession	23:11	36:49

==== Individual statistics ====
===== Passing =====
Team	Name	Comp./Att.	Yards	Touchdowns	Interceptions
A&M	Johnny Manziel	22/34	287	2	1
OKLA	Landry Jones	35/48	278	1	1

===== Rushing =====
Team	Name	Rushes	Yards	Touchdowns
A&M	Johnny Manziel	17	229	2
A&M	Ben Malena	8	56	1
A&M	Trey Williams	6	41	1
OKLA	Brennan Clay	10	44	0
OKLA	Damien Williams	16	41	0
OKLA	Trey Millard	4	28	0

Manziel's 229-yard performance set an FBS record for most rushing yards in a bowl game.

===== Receiving =====
Team	Name	Receptions	Yards	Touchdowns
A&M	Ryan Swope	8	104	1
A&M	Mike Evans	7	83	0
A&M	Uzoma Nwachukwu	3	81	1
A&M	Malcome Kennedy	3	28	0
A&M	Ben Malena	2	11	0
OKLA	Kenny Stills	7	67	0
OKLA	Jalen Saunders	9	63	0
OKLA	Justin Brown	7	57	1
OKLA	Sterling Shepard	4	43	0
OKLA	Damien Williams	5	19	0
