= 1999 Independence Bowl =

1999 Sanford Independence Bowl
Oklahoma Sooners	Ole Miss Rebels
(7–4)	(7–4)
Big 12	SEC
25	27
Head coach: Bob Stoops	Head coach: David Cutcliffe
	1	2	3	4	Total
Oklahoma	3	0	15	7	25
Ole Miss	7	14	0	6	27
- Date: December 31, 1999
- Season: 1999
- Stadium: Independence Stadium
- Location: Shreveport, Louisiana
- MVP: CB Tim Strickland, Ole Miss; QB Josh Heupel, Oklahoma
- Referee: Jim Maconaghy (Big East)
- Attendance: 49,873

United States TV coverage
- Network: ESPN
- Announcers: Rich Waltz (Play by Play); Gino Toretta (Analyst); Don McPherson (Sideline)

The 1999 Independence Bowl was a college football postseason bowl game between the Ole Miss Rebels and the Oklahoma Sooners. It was the last football game of the 20th century.

== Background ==
Ole Miss finished tied for 3rd in the SEC West while the Sooners finished tied for second in the Big 12 South under Bob Stoops in his first year with the program. This was Ole Miss' second straight Independence Bowl and Oklahoma's first bowl game since 1994.

== Game summary ==
Ole Miss took a 21–3 halftime lead on two touchdown passes from Romaro Miller (who went 12-of-17 for 158 yards in the first half, a contrast to his 6-of-11 in the second half) and a Deuce McAllister touchdown run of 80 yards. Oklahoma cut the lead in the third quarter on two touchdown passes from Josh Heupel to make it 21–18 going into the final quarter. Binkley made it 24–18 on a field goal with 11 minutes remaining. Oklahoma however scored on a Heupel touchdown pass to Quenton Griffin to make it 25–24 with 2:17 remaining. But the Rebels had one last drive in them, and Les Binkley's 39-yard field goal won the game for the Rebels as the clock expired, giving Ole Miss their fourth straight bowl win. Oklahoma set the record for most passing yards in an Independence Bowl with 390 yards, as Heupel was named co-MVP, along with Tim Strickland, who had an interception for Ole Miss. McAllister went for 121 yards on 17 carries and 55 yards on 3 catches. In losing efforts, Quenton Griffin rushed for 86 yards on 12 carries and had 8 catches for 65 yards while Brandon Daniels caught six passes for 109 yards.

== Aftermath ==
While the Sooners have not returned to the Independence Bowl since this game, they have played in a bowl game at the end of each season since 1999, including four national championship games. The Rebels have returned to the Independence Bowl just once, in 2002 where they defeated Nebraska behind the arm of Eli Manning 27-23.

== Statistics ==
Statistics	Ole Miss	Oklahoma
First downs	19	27
Rushing yards	159	91
Passing	202	390
Interceptions	2	1
Punts-Average	5-39	1-10
Fumbles-Lost	1-0	3-3
Penalties-Yards	3-13	4-35
