= Landry Jones =

American football player (born 1989)

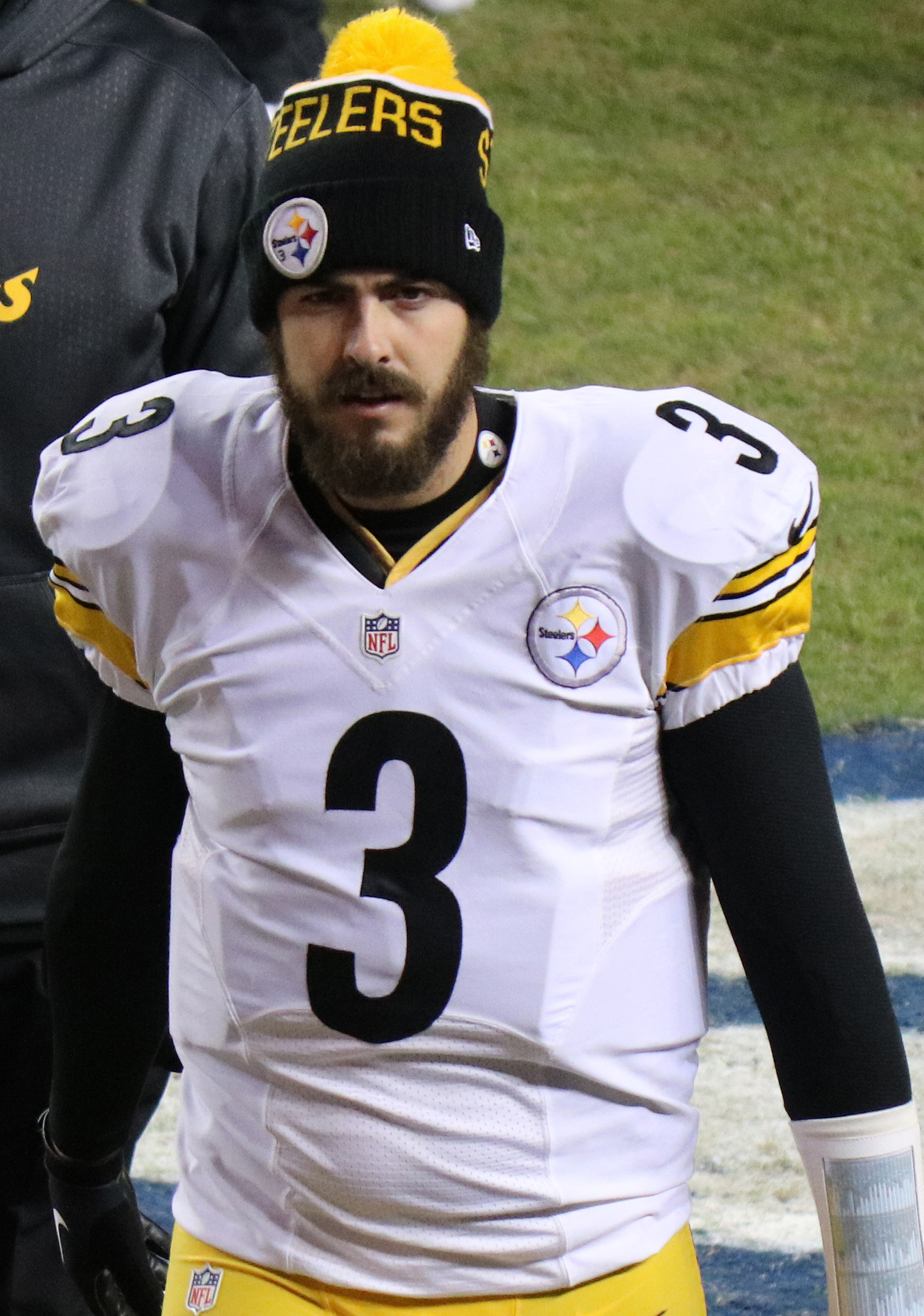
- Jones with the Pittsburgh Steelers in 2016

Tennessee Volunteers
- Title: Offensive analyst

Personal information
- Born: April 4, 1989 (age 37); Artesia, New Mexico, U.S.
- Listed height: 6 ft 4 in (1.93 m)
- Listed weight: 225 lb (102 kg)

Career information
- Position: Quarterback (No. 3)
- High school: Artesia
- College: Oklahoma (2008–2012)
- NFL draft: 2013: 4th round, 115th overall pick

Career history

Playing
- Pittsburgh Steelers (2013–2017); Jacksonville Jaguars (2018); Oakland Raiders (2019)*; Dallas Renegades (2020)
- * Offseason or practice squad member only

Coaching
- Tennessee (2025–present) Offensive analyst

Awards and highlights
- Sammy Baugh Trophy (2010); 2× Second-team All-Big 12 (2010, 2012)

Career NFL statistics
- Passing attempts: 169
- Passing completions: 108
- Completion percentage: 63.9%
- Passing yards: 1,310
- TD–INT: 8–7
- Passer rating: 86.2
- Stats at Pro Football Reference

Matthew Landry Jones (born April 4, 1989) is an American former professional football player who was a quarterback in the National Football League (NFL) and XFL. He played college football for the Oklahoma Sooners and was selected by the Pittsburgh Steelers in the fourth round of the 2013 NFL draft. Jones was also a member of the Jacksonville Jaguars, Oakland Raiders, and Dallas Renegades.

== Early life ==
Jones was born on April 4, 1989, in Artesia, New Mexico. He attended Artesia High School, where he originally lettered as a running back, but later became the starting quarterback and led the high school football team to two consecutive Class 4A state championships, throwing for a combined 7,013 yards and 89 touchdowns. As a senior in 2007, Jones threw for 3,433 yards, 45 touchdowns, and no interceptions. Artesia won its second consecutive Class 4A championship against Goddard High School, where Jones threw for 325 yards and seven touchdowns, a school record. He was later named New Mexico's Class 4A Player of the Year and was a finalist for the Joe Montana Quarterback of the Year Award.

Jones was a highly regarded recruit and was among the highest rated quarterbacks for the Class of 2008 by several ratings publishers, including a four-star rating by both Scout.com (sixth-rated quarterback) and Rivals.com (sixth-rated pro-style quarterback), and a five-star rating from 247 Sports; according to all three sources, Landry is the highest-ranked recruit to ever come out of New Mexico. He was recruited by many schools, including Alabama, Arizona, Michigan, Notre Dame, Oregon, Stanford, Texas, USC, UCLA, and Wisconsin. Jones later committed to the University of Oklahoma, calling it "the QB college."

== College career ==
=== 2008 season ===
While attending the University of Oklahoma, Jones played for the Oklahoma Sooners football team from 2008 to 2012. In 2008, third-string quarterback Keith Nichol transferred to Michigan State, leaving senior Joey Halzle and Jones, who was redshirted his freshman year, as backup quarterbacks to Sam Bradford.

=== 2009 season ===
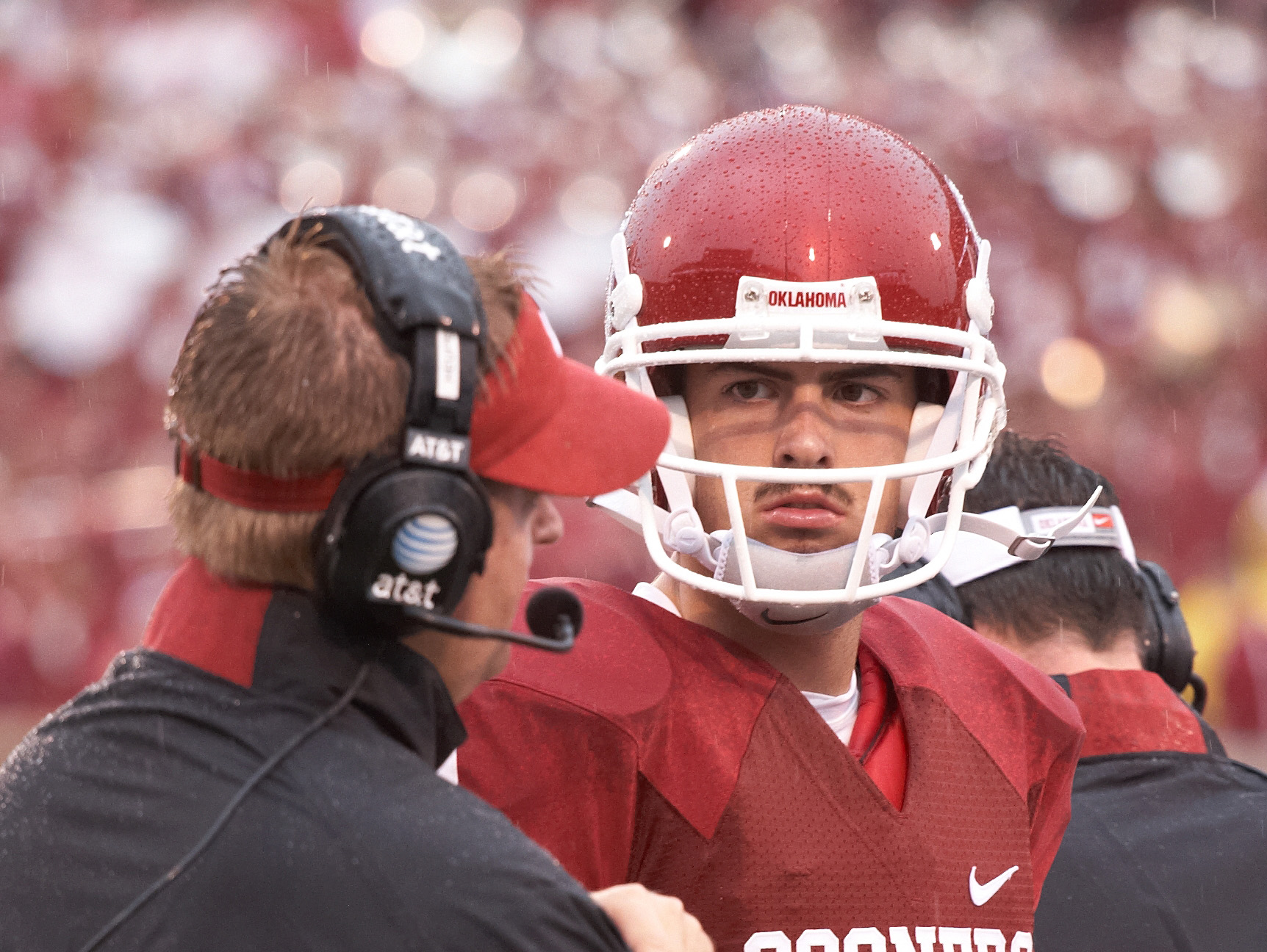
Jones in 2009

In 2009, during the season opener against Brigham Young, Jones took over as the starting quarterback for the Sooners after Bradford suffered a shoulder injury; the Sooners went on to narrowly lose by a score of 14–13. However, in the next game, his first as the starter, Jones completed 18-of-32 passes for 286 yards, three touchdowns, and an interception during the Sooners' 64–0 shutout victory over Idaho State. In his second start, Jones threw a Sooner-record six touchdown passes with two interceptions during a 45–0 shutout victory against Tulsa. Later that week, Jones was named AT&T All- America Player of the Week.

Jones started the next game against the Miami Hurricanes due to Sam Bradford not being fully recovered from his shoulder injury, which the Sooners narrowly lost 21–20. Jones threw a touchdown, but also had a fumble deep in Sooner territory that resulted in a Miami score on the next play. The following week against Baylor, Sam Bradford was able to return, and Landry was relegated to the backup quarterback spot once again. The Oklahoma offense was sluggish and inconsistent at times, but was easily able to beat the Bears and was looking forward to the Red River Rivalry with Texas. On the second offensive series of the game, Bradford went down again with the same shoulder injury and Landry was thrust back into action against a very stout Texas defense. Marred by turnovers and mistakes by an inexperienced offense, the Sooners lost a close battle with the Longhorns, 16–13. Jones managed a touchdown pass to wide receiver Ryan Broyles to tie the game in the third quarter.

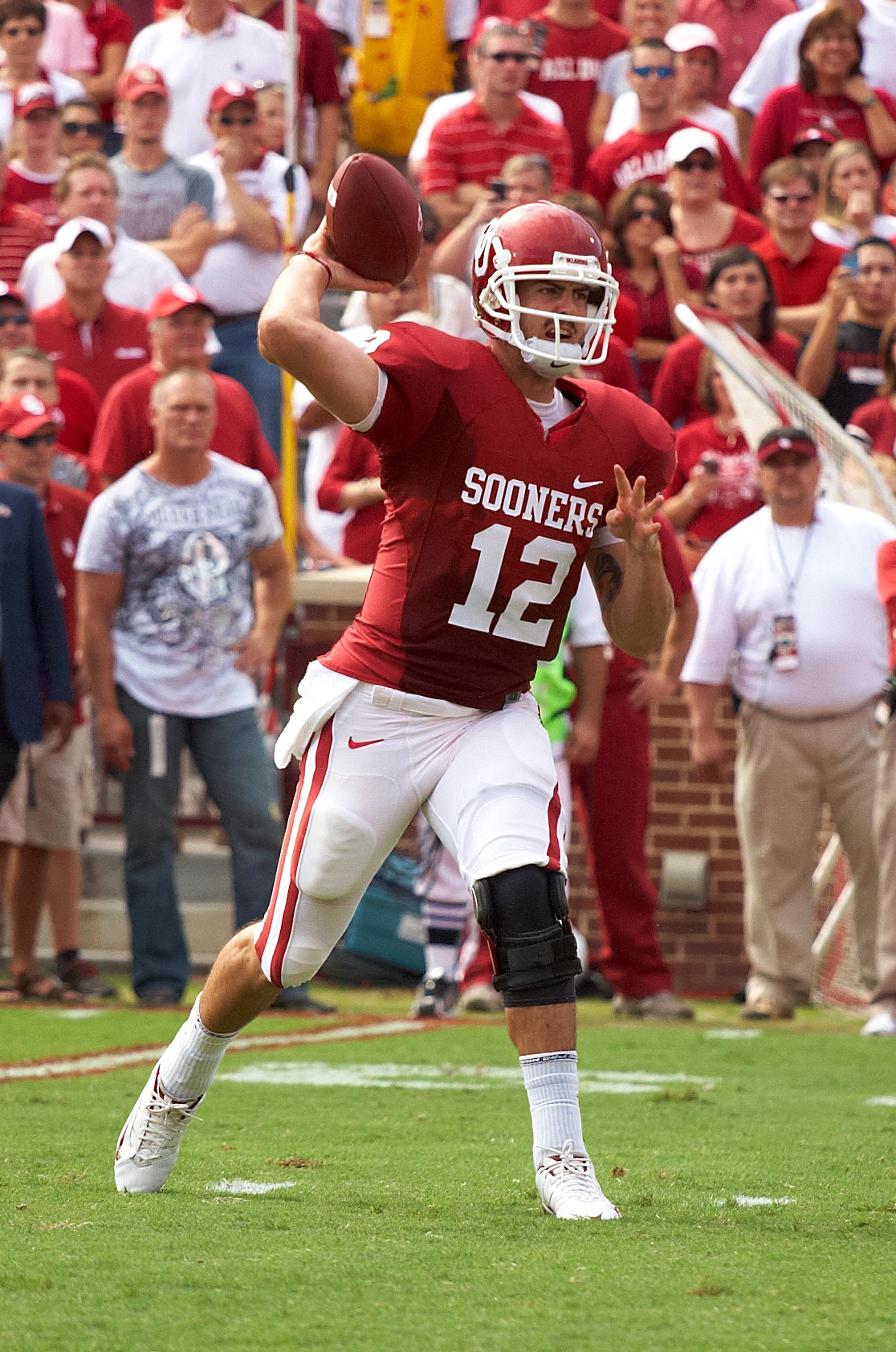
Jones passing in 2009

Jones would become the starter for the rest of the season as Sam Bradford announced that he would have season ending surgery on his shoulder and would then be leaving early for the NFL draft. With big shoes to fill, Jones slowly progressed throughout the season in wins against Kansas, Kansas State, and Texas A&M as well as some poor performances in losses to Nebraska (5 interceptions) and Texas Tech. With a dominant victory over BCS-hopeful Oklahoma State, the Sooners received a bid to play in the 2009 Sun Bowl against Stanford. Jones had his best passing performance of the year with 418 yards and 3 touchdown passes to Ryan Broyles, giving the Sooners their first bowl win since 2005 and propelling the team towards an optimistic 2010 in which Landry would have a full spring and fall camp to prepare as the starting quarterback.

=== 2010 season ===
In 2010, Jones continued his starting job as Oklahoma's quarterback and guided the team through its first four out-of-conference victories. He would continue his dominant performance heading into the Red River Shootout, and defeated Texas by a score of 28–20. After the strong start, Jones would suffer his first setback against Missouri by losing the game, 36–27. He would lead Oklahoma on a rebound with a few top-notch performances before suffering the second and final setback of the season against Texas A&M. After the defeat, Jones would lead the team on another rebound by winning the rest of the way, including a highly anticipated matchup against the Oklahoma State Cowboys in the annual Bedlam Series. The match was settled in the last minute, but Jones's incredible passing performance led Oklahoma past its in-state rival by a score of 47–41.

By rule of a tie-breaker, Oklahoma went into the Big 12 Championship Game facing its storied rival Nebraska. After trailing by 17 points, Jones led the Sooners to a comeback 23–20 victory. After the win, Oklahoma went into the Fiesta Bowl as the champion of the Big 12 Conference, facing Connecticut as the champion of the Big East Conference. Oklahoma entered the game looking to break its recent streak of BCS bowl losses, while Connecticut was playing its first BCS bowl ever. Jones had a great night and carried his team over Connecticut by a lopsided score of 48–20 to break the BCS bowl losing streak and to win Oklahoma's first BCS bowl since 2002.

=== 2011 season ===
In 2011, Jones led the Sooners on dominant performances against opening foes such as Tulsa and Florida State. He would outdo his last year's performance in the Red River Shootout by defeating Texas by a score of 55–17. The Sooners suffered their first setback against Texas Tech, losing by a score of 41–38 at home after two missed field goals. He would continue Oklahoma's dominance before losing his lead wide receiver Ryan Broyles to a knee injury against Texas A&M. After the loss, Jones entered a slump that included two losses to the Baylor Bears and the Oklahoma State Cowboys. Jones ended up leading the Sooners to a victory in the Insight Bowl against the Iowa Hawkeyes to bring the Sooners another double digit winning season.

=== 2012 season ===
On January 5, 2012, Jones announced that he was returning to Oklahoma for his senior season. In 2012, Jones led the Sooners to a 10–2 record overall (8–1 in the Big 12), and shared the Big 12 Conference Championship with Kansas State. His turnovers were the difference in an early season loss to Kansas State, but he played well throughout the rest of the season. They faced former Big 12 member, Texas A&M in the Cotton Bowl Classic, where they lost 41–13. Jones finished the season with a completion percentage of 66 percent with 4,267 passing yards, 30 touchdowns, and 11 interceptions.

Jones finished his collegiate career with 16,646 passing yards, 123 touchdowns, and 52 interceptions.

== Professional career ==
Pre-draft measurables
Height	Weight	Arm length	Hand span	40-yard dash	20-yard shuttle	Three-cone drill	Vertical jump	Broad jump	Wonderlic
6 ft 4 1/8 in (1.93 m)	225 lb (102 kg)	33 in (0.84 m)	9 1/8 in (0.23 m)	5.11 s	4.30 s	7.12 s	31 in (0.79 m)	9 ft 7 in (2.92 m)	28
All values from NFL Combine

=== Pittsburgh Steelers ===
==== 2013–2014 seasons ====
The Pittsburgh Steelers selected Jones in the fourth round (115th pick overall) of the 2013 NFL draft. He signed a four-year, $2.59 million contract with a $439,220 signing bonus on June 12, 2013. The Steelers drafted Jones to develop him into a long-term backup quarterback, replacing retired quarterbacks Charlie Batch and Byron Leftwich.

Prior to the 2015 NFL season, Jones was primarily the third-string quarterback behind longtime starting quarterback Ben Roethlisberger and back-up Bruce Gradkowski.

==== 2015 season ====
During the preseason, Gradkowski was injured and missed the entire 2015 regular season. As a result, Jones received the majority of the starting reps in the pre-season. The Steelers signed veteran Michael Vick to replace Gradkowski due to Jones' lack of experience.

During Week 6 against the Arizona Cardinals, Jones made his NFL debut, replacing an injured Vick in the third quarter with the Steelers down 10–6. He finished the game with 168 passing yards and two touchdowns to Martavis Bryant, as he led the Steelers to a 25–13 comeback victory. In 2015, Jones played in seven games with two starts, completing 32-of-55 passes for 513 yards, three touchdowns, and four interceptions. He also relieved an injured Roethlisberger during the Wild Card Round against the Cincinnati Bengals and completed two of five passes for 11 yards and an interception. However, Roethlisberger later returned to the game and led the Steelers to a narrow 18–16 road victory.

==== 2016 season ====
On October 23, 2016, Jones received his first start of the season against the New England Patriots after Roethlisberger suffered a torn meniscus the week prior. He finished the 27–16 loss completing 29-of-47 passes for 281 yards, a touchdown, and an interception. Due to the Steelers resting some of their starters for the playoffs, Jones started in the season finale against the Cleveland Browns, completing 24-of-37 passes for 277 yards, three touchdowns, and an interception during the 27–24 overtime victory. The game-winning touchdown was a pass from Jones to wide receiver Cobi Hamilton.

==== 2017 season ====
On March 9, 2017, Jones signed a two-year contract extension with the Steelers. Due to the Steelers resting some of their starters, he started in the regular season finale against the Browns, completing 23-of-27 passes for 239 yards, a touchdown, and an interception during the 28–24 victory.

==== 2018 season ====
After drafting Mason Rudolph in the third round of the 2018 NFL draft, the Steelers released Jones on September 1, 2018.

=== Jacksonville Jaguars ===
On October 31, 2018, the Jacksonville Jaguars signed Jones following an injury to starting quarterback Blake Bortles. Jones was released on November 19.

=== Oakland Raiders ===
On March 26, 2019, Jones signed with the Oakland Raiders. He was cut on May 22.

Following his release from the Raiders, Jones briefly took a minimum wage position at a construction company in Fort Worth. The San Antonio Commanders of the Alliance of American Football offered Jones over $1,000,000 to sign, but sensing correctly that the Alliance did not have the funds to cover the promise, he declined.

=== Dallas Renegades ===
On August 15, 2019, Jones signed with the XFL, which was scheduled to begin play in 2020. He was the first player to sign with the league. The Steelers called the XFL office to ask about signing Jones after starting quarterback Ben Roethlisberger suffered a season-ending injury on September 15, but the XFL blocked them. On October 15, the XFL allocated Jones to the Dallas Renegades, reuniting him with his college coach Bob Stoops.

Jones suffered a knee injury on January 7, 2020, during a training camp and was expected to miss four to six weeks. He returned in Week 2 of the 2020 XFL season and passed for 305 yards in a 25–18 victory over the Los Angeles Wildcats. On February 22, Jones completed 30-of-41 passes for 274 yards, three touchdowns, and two interceptions, leading Dallas to a 24–12 victory over the Seattle Sea Dragons. He had his contract terminated when the league suspended operations on April 10, 2020, and opted not to return when the league returned in 2023.

== Career statistics ==
=== NFL ===
==== Regular season ====
Year	Team	Games		Passing								Rushing				Sacks		Fumbles	
Year	Team	GP	GS	Cmp	Att	Pct	Yds	Avg	TD	Int	Rtg	Att	Yds	Avg	TD	Sck	SckY	Fum	Lost
2013	PIT	0	0	DNP															
2014	OAK	0	0	DNP															
2015	PIT	7	2	32	55	58.2	513	9.3	3	4	77.3	5	−5	−1.0	0	2	17	1	1
2016	PIT	8	2	53	86	61.6	558	6.5	4	2	86.3	6	−4	−0.7	0	4	34	0	0
2017	PIT	3	1	23	28	82.1	239	8.5	1	1	99.3	8	−10	−1.3	0	3	15	1	1
Career		18	5	108	169	63.9	1,310	7.8	8	7	86.2	19	−19	−1.0	0	9	66	2	2

==== Postseason ====
Year	Team	Games		Passing								Rushing				Sacks		Fumbles	
Year	Team	GP	GS	Cmp	Att	Pct	Yds	Avg	TD	Int	Rtg	Att	Yds	Avg	TD	Sck	SckY	Fum	Lost
2015	PIT	1	0	2	5	40.0	11	2.2	0	1	8.3	0	0	0.0	0	1	11	0	0
2016	PIT	0	0	DNP															
2017	PIT	0	0	DNP															
Career		1	0	2	5	40.0	11	2.2	0	1	8.3	0	0	0.0	0	1	11	0	0

=== XFL ===
Year	Team	Games		Passing								Rushing			
Year	Team	GP	GS	Cmp	Att	Pct	Yds	Y/A	TD	Int	Rtg	Att	Yds	Avg	TD
2020	DAL	4	3	83	119	69.7	784	6.6	5	7	77.2	5	15	3.0	0

=== College ===
Season	Team	Passing								Rushing			
Season	Team	Cmp	Att	Pct	Yds	Y/A	TD	Int	Rtg	Att	Yds	Avg	TD
2009	Oklahoma	261	449	58.1	3,198	7.1	26	14	130.8	35	−113	−3.2	0
2010	Oklahoma	405	617	65.6	4,718	7.6	38	12	146.3	51	−128	−2.5	1
2011	Oklahoma	355	562	63.2	4,463	7.9	29	15	141.6	32	−24	−0.8	2
2012	Oklahoma	367	555	66.1	4,267	7.7	30	11	144.6	14	−110	−7.9	0
Career		1,388	2,183	63.6	16,646	7.6	123	52	141.5	132	−375	−2.8	3

== Coaching career ==
On January 2, 2025, Jones joined the Tennessee football coaching staff as an offensive analyst.

== Personal life ==
Jones was named after Dallas Cowboys coach Tom Landry. Jones is a Christian and was featured in an "I Am Second" video proclaiming his faith in Jesus Christ.

Jones married former Oklahoma Sooner women's basketball guard Whitney Hand-Jones on July 6, 2012, and they have four children together. His wife was selected by the San Antonio Stars in the 2013 WNBA draft in the third round with the 32nd overall pick.

== See also ==
- List of Division I FBS passing yardage leaders
- List of Division I FBS passing touchdown leaders
