= Demontre Hurst =

American football player (born 1991)

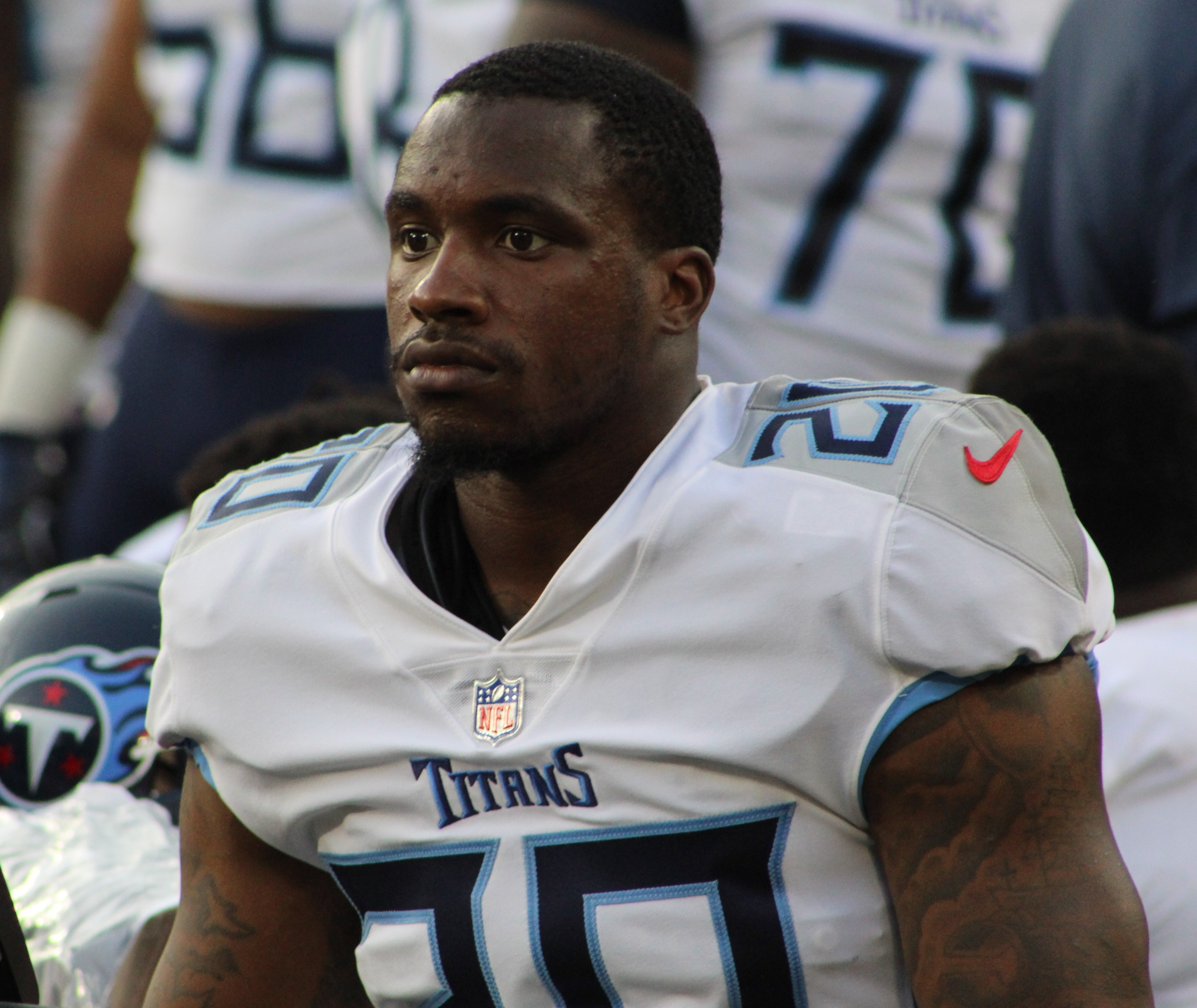
- Hurst with the Tennessee Titans in 2018

No. 30, 20, 41
- Position: Cornerback

Personal information
- Born: March 24, 1991 (age 35); Lancaster, Texas, U.S.
- Listed height: 5 ft 10 in (1.78 m)
- Listed weight: 183 lb (83 kg)

Career information
- High school: Lancaster
- College: Oklahoma
- NFL draft: 2013: undrafted

Career history
- Chicago Bears (2013–2016); Tennessee Titans (2017); Hamilton Tiger-Cats (2019)*; Tampa Bay Vipers (2020)
- * Offseason or practice squad member only

Awards and highlights
- 2× Second-team All-Big 12 (2011, 2012)

Career NFL statistics
- Total tackles: 58
- Sacks: 1.0
- Forced fumbles: 1
- Pass deflections: 3
- Interceptions: 2
- Stats at Pro Football Reference

Demontre Hurst (born March 24, 1991) is an American former professional football player who was a cornerback in the National Football League (NFL) . He played college football for the Oklahoma Sooners and signed with the Chicago Bears as an undrafted free agent in 2013. Hurst was also a member of the Tennessee Titans, Hamilton Tiger-Cats, and Tampa Bay Vipers.

== Early life ==
Hurst played high school football for Lancaster High School in Texas. As a senior, he recorded 75 tackles, three fumble recoveries, a forced fumble, five interceptions, and a touchdown.

== College career ==
Hurst played from 2009 to 2012 for the Oklahoma Sooners. He appeared in 53 games with 40 starts over four seasons at Oklahoma and totaled 178 tackles, 10 tackles for loss, two sacks for 17 yards, two interceptions for 104 yards, four forced fumbles, three fumble recoveries, and 33 passes defensed.

== Professional career ==
Pre-draft measurables
Height	Weight	40-yard dash	10-yard split	20-yard split	20-yard shuttle	Three-cone drill	Vertical jump	Broad jump	Bench press
5 ft 9 in (1.75 m)	189 lb (86 kg)	4.51 s	1.54 s	2.60 s	4.26 s	7.16 s	37 in (0.94 m)	10 ft 0 in (3.05 m)	11 reps
All values from Oklahoma Pro Day

=== Chicago Bears ===
Hurst was signed by the Chicago Bears on April 28, 2013, after going undrafted in the 2013 NFL draft. On August 31, Hurst was released by the Bears. Four days later, he was re-signed to the Bears' practice squad. On December 30, Hurst signed a futures contract with the Bears.

On September 8, 2014, Hurst was released by the Bears. On September 18, he was re-signed to Chicago's 53-man roster. On October 12, Hurst recorded his first interception of his career, intercepting Matt Ryan in the fourth quarter of a game against the Atlanta Falcons.

On September 19, 2015, Hurst was released by the Bears. Three days later, Hurst was re-signed to the Bears' practice squad. On October 7, Hurst was promoted to the Bears' 53-man roster. On October 19, Hurst was released, but was re-signed to the practice squad two days later. On December 12, 2015, Hurst was promoted to the Bears' 53-man roster.

On September 3, 2016, Hurst was released by the Bears as part of the team's final roster cuts, but was signed to the practice squad the following day. On October 8, Hurst was promoted to the Bears' 53-man roster, but was released two days later. On October 12, Hurst again was re-signed to the Bears' practice squad two days later. On October 25, Hurst was promoted to the active roster. On December 11, Hurst recorded an interception, his first of the season, against the Detroit Lions.

=== Tennessee Titans ===
On April 3, 2017, Hurst signed with the Tennessee Titans. He was waived on September 2. Hurst was re-signed by the Titans on December 22. He was waived on December 29.

On February 5, 2018, Hurst re-signed with the Titans. He was released by the Titans on September 1.

=== Hamilton Tiger-Cats ===
Hurst signed with the Hamilton Tiger-Cats of the Canadian Football League on May 10, 2019. He was released on June 8, 2019.

=== Tampa Bay Vipers ===
Hurst was selected in the 3rd round during phase four in the 2020 XFL draft by the Tampa Bay Vipers. He had his contract terminated when the league suspended operations on April 10, 2020.
