= Justin Brown (wide receiver) =

American gridiron football player (born 1991)

No. 14
- Position: Wide receiver

Personal information
- Born: March 10, 1991 (age 35); Cheltenham, Pennsylvania, U.S.
- Listed height: 6 ft 3 in (1.91 m)
- Listed weight: 209 lb (95 kg)

Career information
- High school: Concord (Wilmington, Delaware)
- College: Oklahoma
- NFL draft: 2013: 6th round, 186th overall pick

Career history
- Pittsburgh Steelers (2013–2014); Buffalo Bills (2015)*; Toronto Argonauts (2017)*
- * Offseason or practice squad member only

Career NFL statistics
- Receptions: 12
- Receiving yards: 94
- Stats at Pro Football Reference

Justin Brown (born March 10, 1991) is an American former professional football player who was a wide receiver in the National Football League (NFL). He played college football for the Oklahoma Sooners and was selected by the Pittsburgh Steelers in the sixth round of the 2013 NFL draft. He was also a member of the Buffalo Bills and Toronto Argonauts.

== College career ==
Brown played college football for the Oklahoma Sooners for his senior season after transferring from the Penn State Nittany Lions.

== Professional career ==
=== Pittsburgh Steelers ===
Brown was selected by the Pittsburgh Steelers in the sixth round of the 2013 NFL draft. After being drafted, Brown was on the Steelers practice squad for his rookie season. He played eight games during the 2014 season for a total of 12 passes for 94 yards and one lost fumble. Following the 2014 NFL season, Brown was waived by the Steelers.

=== Buffalo Bills ===
On February 3, 2015, the Buffalo Bills claimed Brown off waivers. On August 9, 2015, Brown was waived/injured by the Bills. On August 13, 2015, he reached an injury settlement with the Bills and was released.

=== Toronto Argonauts ===
On April 3, 2017, Brown signed with the Toronto Argonauts of the Canadian Football League.
