= David King (defensive end) =

American football player (born 1989)

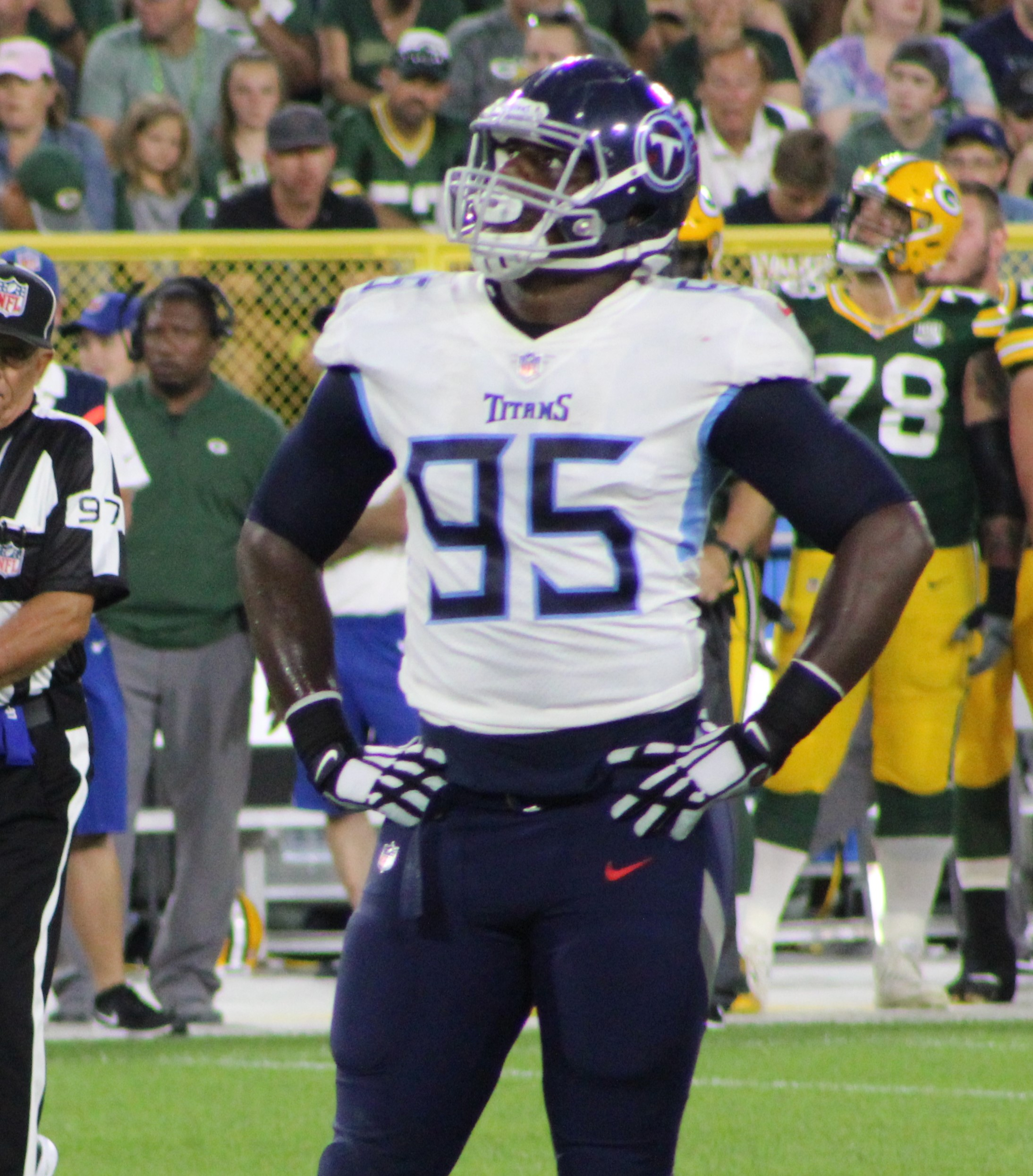
- King with the Tennessee Titans in 2018

No. 70, 93, 95
- Position: Defensive end

Personal information
- Born: December 27, 1989 (age 36); Houston, Texas, U.S.
- Listed height: 6 ft 4 in (1.93 m)
- Listed weight: 281 lb (127 kg)

Career information
- High school: Strake Jesuit College Preparatory (Houston)
- College: Oklahoma
- NFL draft: 2013: 7th round, 239th overall pick

Career history
- Philadelphia Eagles (2013)*; Cincinnati Bengals (2013–2014)*; Seattle Seahawks (2014–2015); Kansas City Chiefs (2015–2016); Tennessee Titans (2017)
- * Offseason or practice squad member only

Career NFL statistics
- Total tackles: 7
- Sacks: 2.5
- Stats at Pro Football Reference

David King (born December 27, 1989) is an American former professional football player who was a defensive end in the National Football League (NFL). He was selected by the Philadelphia Eagles in the seventh round of the 2013 NFL draft after playing college football for the Oklahoma Sooners.

== Professional career ==
=== Philadelphia Eagles ===
King was selected by the Philadelphia Eagles in the seventh round, (239th overall), of the 2013 NFL draft. On October 22, 2013, King was signed to the practice squad. On January 6, 2014, he was signed a future contract. On August 30, 2014, King was waived by the Eagles.

=== Cincinnati Bengals ===
On August 31, 2014, he was signed to the practice squad of the Cincinnati Bengals. He signed a reserve/future contract with the Bengals on January 6, 2014. He was waived on August 30, 2014 and signed to the practice squad the next day.

=== Seattle Seahawks ===
On December 11, 2014, King was signed to the Seattle Seahawks from the Bengals' practice squad. On November 16, 2015, he was waived by the Seahawks.

=== Kansas City Chiefs ===
On November 17, 2015, King was claimed off waivers by the Kansas City Chiefs from the Seahawks. On September 3, 2016, he was released by the Chiefs. The next day, he was signed to the Chiefs' practice squad. He was promoted to the active roster on November 5, 2016, but was released on November 14 and re-signed to the practice squad. He was promoted back to the active roster on December 17, 2016. He was waived on December 30, 2016, and was re-signed back to the practice squad. He signed a reserve/future contract with the Chiefs on January 19, 2017.

=== Tennessee Titans ===
On September 1, 2017, King was traded to the Tennessee Titans for a 2018 seventh round draft pick.

On September 1, 2018, King was released by the Titans.
