= 2002 Cotton Bowl Classic =

2002 SBC Cotton Bowl Classic
- 66th Cotton Bowl Classic
- The Cotton Bowl in Dallas, Texas, hosted the Cotton Bowl Classic.
| Oklahoma Sooners | Arkansas Razorbacks |
| (10–2) | (7–4) |
| Big 12 | SEC |
| 10 | 3 |
| Head coach: Bob Stoops | Head coach: Houston Nutt |
| AP / Coaches / BCS; 10 / 10 / 11 |
| | 1 | 2 | 3 | 4 | Total |
|---|---|---|---|---|---|
| Oklahoma | 7 | 0 | 3 | 0 | 10 |
| Arkansas | 0 | 0 | 0 | 3 | 3 |
- Date: January 1, 2002
- Season: 2001
- Stadium: Cotton Bowl
- Location: Dallas, Texas
- MVP: RB Quentin Griffin (Oklahoma); S Roy Williams (Oklahoma)
- Referee: Dennis Lipski (Big Ten)
- Attendance: 72,955

United States TV coverage
- Network: Fox
- Announcers: Thom Brennaman, Tim Green, Brian Baldinger and Dave Lapham

The 2002 Cotton Bowl Classic matched the Arkansas Razorbacks and the Oklahoma Sooners.

== Background ==
This was the Sooners first Cotton Bowl Classic appearance ever. The Sooners finished 2nd in the Big 12 South after two crucial losses to Nebraska and Oklahoma State. This was the first appearance for the Razorbacks since 2000. Despite finishing 5th in the SEC West, they were invited to this game.

== Game summary ==
Arkansas QBs were sacked nine times by Oklahoma, a school record and tying a Cotton Bowl Classic record. Arkansas could manage only 50 yards of total offense, and one Brennan O'Donohoe field goal late in the game. Oklahoma QB Nate Hybl ran in from one yard out for the only touchdown of the game. Sooner Rocky Calmus, the Butkus Award winner and Nagurski, Bednarik, and Lombardi finalist had nine tackles and a fumble recovery in the effort. Razorback coach Houston Nutt said, "[The Oklahoma defense is] the best I've seen in 15 years.
