= Bob Stoops =

American football player and coach (born 1960)

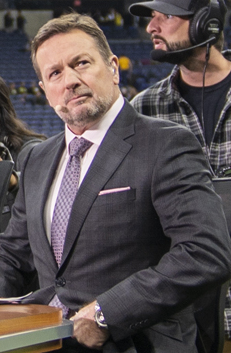
- Stoops in 2021

Profile
- Position: Head coach

Personal information
- Born: September 9, 1960 (age 66); Youngstown, Ohio, U.S.

Career information
- High school: Youngstown (OH) Cardinal Mooney
- College: Iowa (1979–1982)
- NFL draft: 1983: undrafted

Career history
- Iowa (1983–1984) Graduate assistant; Iowa (1985–1987) Assistant; Kent State (1988) Assistant; Kansas State (1989–1990) Defensive backs coach; Kansas State (1991–1995) Co-defensive coordinator; Florida (1996–1998) Defensive coordinator / assistant head coach; Oklahoma (1999–2016) Head coach; Dallas Renegades (2020) Head coach & general manager; Oklahoma (2021) Interim head coach; Arlington Renegades (2023–2025) Head coach

Awards and highlights
- XFL champion (2023); National champion (2000); 10× Big 12 champion (2000, 2002, 2004, 2006–2008, 2010, 2012, 2015–2016); 8× Big 12 South champion (2000, 2002–2004, 2006–2008, 2010); 2× Walter Camp Coach of the Year (2000, 2003); Paul "Bear" Bryant Award (2000); The Home Depot Coach of the Year Award (2000); George Munger Award (2000); AP Coach of the Year (2000); 6× Big 12 Coach of the Year (2000, 2003, 2006, 2008, 2015–2016); Bobby Dodd Coach of the Year Award (2003); Woody Hayes Trophy Coach of the Year (2000); Disney's Wide World of Sports Spirit Award (2014); First-team All-Big Ten (1982)

Head coaching record
- Regular season: NCAA 191–48 (.799); XFL 6–9 (.400); UFL 8–12 (.400)
- Postseason: XFL 2–0 (1.000)
- Career: NCAA 191–48 (.799); XFL 8–9 (.471); UFL 8–12 (.400)
- College Football Hall of Fame

Robert Anthony Stoops (born September 9, 1960) is an American former football coach who was the head football coach at the University of Oklahoma from 1999 through the 2016 season, and on an interim basis during the 2021 Alamo Bowl. He led the Oklahoma Sooners to a record of 191–48 over his career. His 2000 Oklahoma Sooners football team won the 2001 Orange Bowl, which served as the BCS National Championship Game, and earned a consensus national championship. Stoops also was a head coach with the XFL, coaching the Renegades in 2020, and from 2023 to 2025. Stoops' Renegades won the XFL Championship in 2023.

Stoops played college football at the University of Iowa as a defensive back from 1979 to 1982. Prior to his tenure at Oklahoma, he held various assistant coaching positions at the University of Iowa, Kent State University, Kansas State University, and the University of Florida. Stoops was awarded the Paul "Bear" Bryant Award in 2000 and the Walter Camp Coach of the Year Award in both 2000 and 2003. Stoops has been nicknamed "Big Game Bob" by both supporters and detractors.

Stoops was inducted into the College Football Hall of Fame as a coach in 2021.

== High school and college ==
Stoops is one of six children born to Ron Sr. and Evelyn "Dee Dee" Stoops in Youngstown, Ohio. He is a 1978 graduate of Cardinal Mooney High School, where his father was the long-time defensive coordinator of the football team. Bob and his three brothers (Ron Jr., Mike, and Mark) were all coached by Ron Sr. at Mooney. During a game in 1988 against the team coached by Ron Jr., Ron Sr. began experiencing chest pains. He was placed in an ambulance following the game and died en route to the hospital.

While at Iowa, Stoops was a four-year starter, and one-time All-Big Ten selection at defensive back at the University of Iowa. He was named Team MVP in 1982.

== Coaching career ==
=== Assistant coach ===
After graduating with a marketing degree in 1983, Stoops began his coaching career as a volunteer coach and graduate assistant in the Iowa Hawkeyes program under Hayden Fry. He next was an assistant at Kent State University under Dick Crum in 1988, and then joined the coaching staff at Kansas State University the following year. Stoops was named co-defensive coordinator at Kansas State under Bill Snyder in 1991 and assistant head coach and co-defensive coordinator in 1995. During his tenure on the Wildcats staff, Stoops played a key role in their impressive turnaround, helping take what many considered to be the worst program in Division I-A to national contention. During his final four seasons there, Kansas State was 35–12 with three bowl appearances.

Stoops then left for the University of Florida, serving three years as Steve Spurrier's defensive coordinator. Hired after Florida allowed 62 points to Nebraska in the 1996 Fiesta Bowl, he was granted authority over the Gators defense; the team responded by winning the national championship over Florida State in the 1997 Sugar Bowl.

Due to his success leading defenses at Kansas State and Florida, Stoops was mentioned as a future head coach.

=== Oklahoma ===
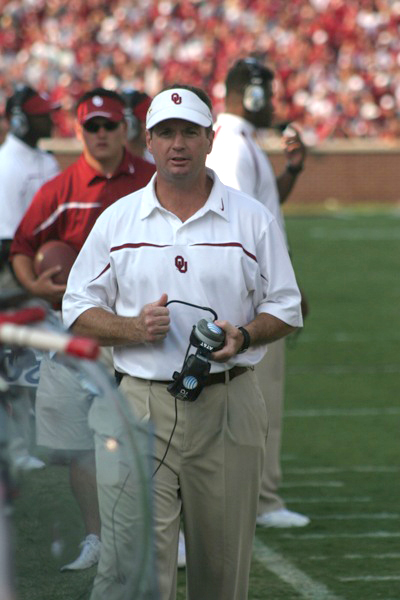
Stoops paces the sideline in 2006

The University of Oklahoma named Stoops its head coach in 1999. OU won seven games in Stoops' first year, taking the Sooners to their first bowl game since the 1994 season.

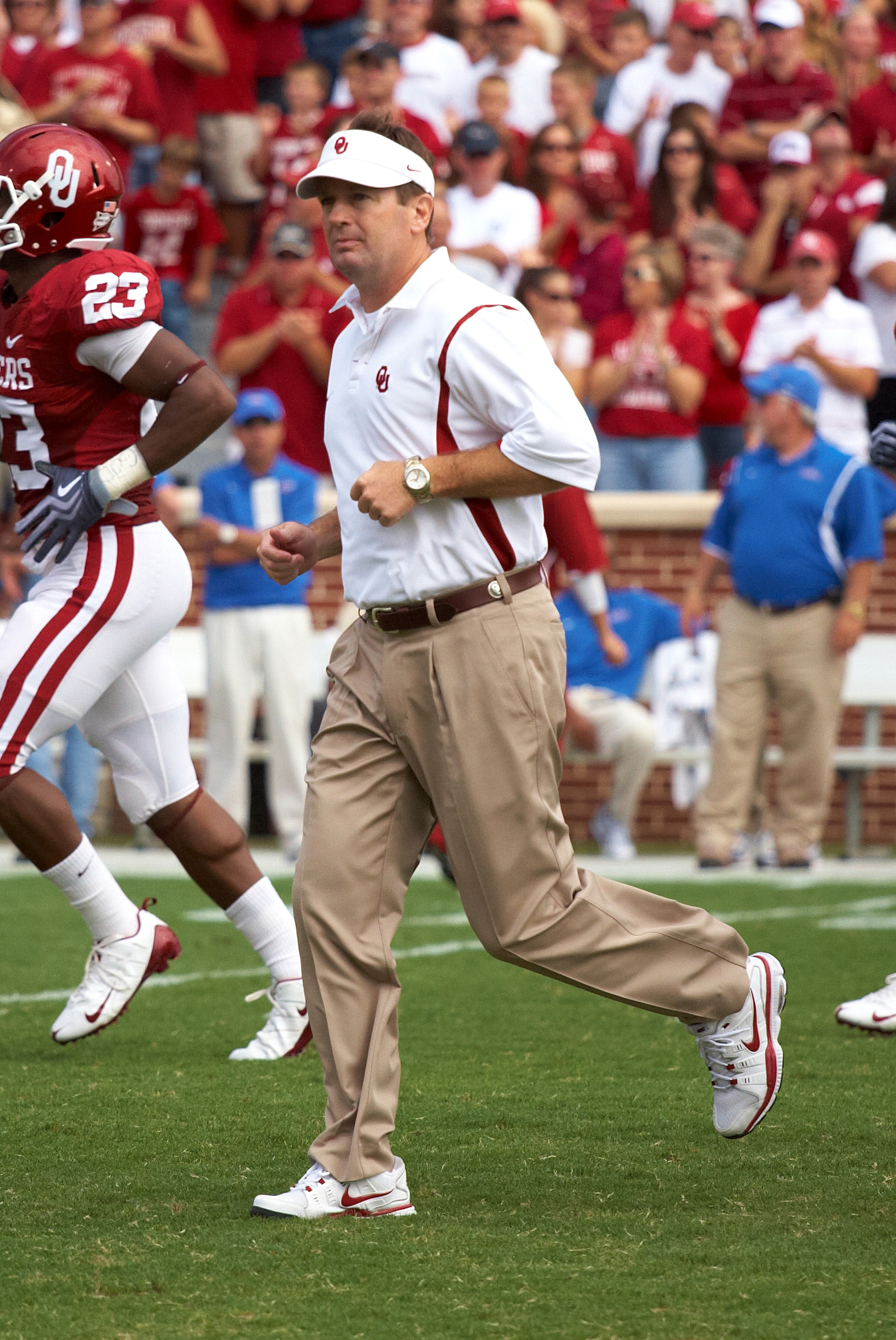
Stoops in 2009

In his 18 years as head coach of the Sooners, Stoops had a combined record of 190–48 (.798). On November 16, 2013, Stoops notched his 157th win as Oklahoma's head coach with a victory over Iowa State, tying him with Barry Switzer for the most wins in Sooners history. A week later, on November 23, 2013, he surpassed Switzer's record with a 41–31 victory over Kansas State. Stoops accumulated a home winning streak of 39 consecutive games from 2005 to 2011. The streak was ended on October 22, 2011, when Texas Tech defeated Oklahoma 41–38. He also had the most wins of the decade of any BCS school with 110 (2000–2009). Along with Switzer, Bud Wilkinson and Bennie Owen, he is one of four coaches to win over 100 games at the University of Oklahoma; no other college football program has had more than three coaches accomplish such a feat. Overall, Oklahoma was 4–6 in BCS games and 9–9 in bowl games under Stoops. Stoops, along with Bill Snyder of Kansas State, were among the first to use the JUCO systems of their respective states to help their programs progress.

Stoops led the Sooners to the 2000 BCS National Championship and finished the season undefeated, outscoring thirteen opponents by a combined 481–194. His Oklahoma teams again earned the opportunity to play in the BCS National Championship Game in 2004, 2005 and 2009, losing to LSU, 21–14, in the 2004 Sugar Bowl, and to USC, 55–19 in the 2005 Orange Bowl, and Florida, 24–14, in the 2009 BCS National Championship Game. Under Stoops, Oklahoma had four BCS National Championship Game appearances, a record shared with Florida State.

Stoops' teams finished the season ranked in the Top 10 of the polls for 11 of his 18 seasons, seven times finishing in the top five.

Stoops led his team to bowl games in each of his 18 years at Oklahoma, ten of which were Bowl Championship Series (BCS) bowls, including the Big 12 Conference's first Rose Bowl victory as the Sooners upended Washington State, 34–14, in the 2003 Rose Bowl. With Oklahoma's victory over Alabama at the 2014 Sugar Bowl, Stoops became the first and only coach to win all four BCS bowl games and a BCS National Championship.

Stoops' penchant for winning big games early in his career earned him the nickname "Big Game Bob", From 1999 to 2003, Oklahoma under Stoops was 18–2 (0.900) vs. ranked opponents and 3–1 (0.750) in bowl games, with one national title and three Big 12 titles.

Late in the 2003 season, however, Bob's brother Mike Stoops left his position of defensive coordinator and associate head coach at Oklahoma to accept the head coaching job at Arizona. The Sooners promptly lost two games in a row against ranked teams after Mike's departure that season (a 35–7 loss against #13 Kansas State in the Big 12 Title Game, and a 21–14 loss to #3 LSU in the BCS National Title Game). Since then (2004–2016), Stoops' teams went 17–13 vs. ranked opponents, and 3–4 in Bowl Games with no National Titles (although they played for 3 more), and five Big 12 Titles. Stoops' teams did finish with two Heisman Trophy winners during this time, however, and two runners-up.

Under Stoops, the Sooners won ten Big 12 Conference championships, the most of any Big 12 team. Oklahoma is also the only Big 12 team to win back-to-back-to-back Big 12 championships. Stoops posted a 121-29 (.807) conference record during his career, and was named the Big 12 Coach of the Year six times.

In his 18 seasons as Sooners' head coach, Stoops was 11–7 against the Texas Longhorns in the Red River Rivalry. During a five-game winning streak in that rivalry from 2000 to 2004, his Sooners handed the Longhorns two of their worst defeats in school history, 63–14 in 2000 and 65–13 in 2003. Since then, he led the team to additional large-margin wins of 55–17 in 2011 and 63–21 in 2012.

On July 11, 2007, Oklahoma was placed on probation for two years by the NCAA for a rules violation involving quarterback Rhett Bomar and offensive lineman JD Quinn, whom the university had previously suspended from the team due to the players' efforts to obtain payment for hours not worked. While the students who violated the rules were reinstated by the NCAA and allowed to play for other schools, the university, which had self-reported the violations, was initially directed to vacate all wins during the 2005–06 season, which included a 17–14 win over the University of Oregon in the Holiday Bowl. Oklahoma appealed the NCAA's ruling of a "failure to monitor" the employment of players in the program, as well as a reduction in scholarships and probation lasting until May 2010. On February 22, 2008, the NCAA reversed part of the decision and reinstated the vacated wins.

Stoops' 2008 team went down in the history books as the highest scoring team in college football history, scoring a total of 716 points, averaging 51 points per game. Over five consecutive games, the Sooners scored 60 points or more, another record (in the game prior to the streak, the Sooners scored 58 points). After a four-week layoff, the offense was held in check against the nation's best defense of the Florida Gators in the National Championship game, scoring only 14 points and committing two turnovers near the Florida goal line. The Sooners were without one of their star offensive playmakers in DeMarco Murray, who sat out with an injury. However, the Sooners' 2008 defense, which was much maligned during the season for allowing a Stoops'-worst 25 points per game average, held the Florida Gators' high-powered Tim Tebow-led offense to only 24 points, 21 points below their season average.

Stoops' success at Oklahoma made him the frequent subject of head coach searches by NFL teams and college programs alike, which he repeatedly turned down. He was reportedly the top-paid coach in Division I-A football with annual compensation in excess of $3 million until Nick Saban was signed by the University of Alabama for $4 million per year in 2007. However, Stoops did receive a "longevity bonus" of $3 million at the end of the 2008 season (his 10th), making his annual salary in 2008 approximately $6.1 million (equivalent to $9.1 million in 2025) .

In the 2012 season, he led the Sooners back to the top 25 and went to the Cotton Bowl, losing to Heisman Trophy-winning Johnny Manziel and the Texas A&M Aggies, 41–13. In his career at Oklahoma, several of Stoops' assistants became head coaches at other Division I-A programs, including his brother Mike Stoops (Arizona), Mark Mangino (Kansas), Mike Leach (Texas Tech, Washington State and Mississippi State), Chuck Long (San Diego State), Bo Pelini (Nebraska and Youngstown State), Kevin Sumlin (Texas A&M), Kevin Wilson (Indiana), and his eventual successor, Lincoln Riley (USC, Oklahoma).

Stoops is the only head coach in the BCS era to have won the Rose Bowl, Orange Bowl, Fiesta Bowl, and Sugar Bowl.

On June 7, 2017, Stoops announced his retirement from college coaching. He was succeeded by Lincoln Riley as Oklahoma's head football coach.

=== XFL and Oklahoma return ===
On February 7, 2019, Stoops announced his plans to come out of retirement, as he was named head coach/general manager of the Dallas Renegades in the XFL. He served in this role until the league ceased operations on April 14, 2020, due to bankruptcy stemming from the COVID-19 outbreak.

On November 28, 2021, Stoops was named interim head coach for the Oklahoma Sooners' bowl game after Lincoln Riley took the USC Trojans head coaching job. Stoops coached the Sooners in the 2021 Alamo Bowl, which they won 47–32.

On April 13, 2022, Stoops re-signed with the XFL, which had returned under new ownership. In 2023, the renamed Arlington Renegades finished second in the XFL South Division—despite the fact the Renegades finished the regular season with a sub-.500 (4–6) record—and advanced to the XFL playoffs. In the South Division championship game, the Renegades defeated the Houston Roughnecks to advance to the XFL Championship Game, where the Renegades defeated the DC Defenders, 35–26.

=== Retirement ===
On December 15, 2025, Stoops again announced his retirement from coaching.

== Personal life ==
Stoops is married to Carol Stoops, a Mary Kay National Sales Director. They have three children: a daughter, Mackenzie, who now attends the University of Oklahoma, and twin sons, Isaac and Drake. Drake Stoops plays wide receiver for the Los Angeles Rams. Isaac Stoops has coached at the high school level as a wide receivers coach for Moore (OK) High School and took a position as a volunteer analyst with the University of Oklahoma Sooners for the 2021-22 football season.

Stoops' younger brother, Mike, is the former defensive coordinator for the Sooners and was previously head football coach at the University of Arizona. He currently serves as inside linebackers coach for the football program of University of Kentucky. Another brother (the youngest), Mark, became the head coach at the University of Kentucky in November 2012. Stoops' older brother, Ron Jr., was an assistant football coach at Youngstown State University in Youngstown, Ohio.

Stoops remains close with Steve Spurrier, his mentor from the University of Florida.

== Honors ==
Stoops was inducted into the Rose Bowl Hall of Fame as a member of the 2025 class.

== Coaching tree ==
Head coaches under whom Stoops served:

- Hayden Fry: Iowa (1983–1987)
- Dick Crum: Kent State (1988)
- Bill Snyder: Kansas State (1989–1995)
- Steve Spurrier: Florida (1996–1998)

Assistant coaches under Stoops who became college or professional head coaches:

- Mike Leach: Texas Tech (2000–2009), Washington State (2012–2020), Mississippi State (2020–2022)
- Chuck Long: San Diego State (2006–2008)
- Mark Mangino: Kansas (2002–2009)
- Jay Norvell: Nevada (2017–2021), Colorado State (2022–2025)
- Bo Pelini: Nebraska (2003, 2008–2014), Youngstown State (2015–2019)
- Mike Stoops: Arizona (2004–2011)
- Kevin Sumlin: Houston (2008–2011), Texas A&M (2012–2017), Arizona (2018–2020), Houston Gamblers (2022, 2026–present)
- Kevin Wilson: Indiana (2011–2016), Tulsa (2023–2024)
- Lincoln Riley: Oklahoma (2017–2021), USC (2022–present)
- Josh Heupel: UCF (2018–2020), Tennessee (2021–present)
- Jonathan Hayes: St. Louis BattleHawks (2020)
- Brent Venables: Oklahoma (2022–present)
- Ryan Walters: Purdue (2023–2024)
- Jeff Lebby: Mississippi State (2024–present)

== Head coaching record ==
=== College ===
Year	Team	Overall	Conference	Standing	Bowl/playoffs	Coaches^{#}	AP^{°}
Oklahoma Sooners (Big 12 Conference) (1999–2016)
1999	Oklahoma	7–5	5–3	T–2nd (South)	L Independence		
2000	Oklahoma	13–0	8–0	1st (South)	W Orange^{†}	1	1
2001	Oklahoma	11–2	6–2	2nd (South)	W Cotton	6	6
2002	Oklahoma	12–2	6–2	T–1st (South)	W Rose^{†}	5	5
2003	Oklahoma	12–2	8–0	1st (South)	L Sugar^{†}	3	3
2004	Oklahoma	12–1	8–0	1st (South)	L Orange^{†}	3	3
2005	Oklahoma	8–4	6–2	T–2nd (South)	W Holiday	22	22
2006	Oklahoma	11–3	7–1	1st (South)	L Fiesta^{†}	11	11
2007	Oklahoma	11–3	6–2	1st (South)	L Fiesta^{†}	8	8
2008	Oklahoma	12–2	7–1	T–1st (South)	L BCS NCG^{†}	5	5
2009	Oklahoma	8–5	5–3	T–3rd (South)	W Sun		
2010	Oklahoma	12–2	6–2	T–1st (South)	W Fiesta^{†}	6	6
2011	Oklahoma	10–3	6–3	T–3rd	W Insight	15	16
2012	Oklahoma	10–3	8–1	T–1st	L Cotton	15	15
2013	Oklahoma	11–2	7–2	T–2nd	W Sugar^{†}	6	6
2014	Oklahoma	8–5	5–4	T–4th	L Russell Athletic		
2015	Oklahoma	11–2	8–1	1st	L Orange^{†}	5	5
2016	Oklahoma	11–2	9–0	1st	W Sugar^{†}	3	5
Oklahoma Sooners (Big 12 Conference) (2021)
2021	Oklahoma	1–0			W Alamo (Note: Stoops returned to coach the bowl game after Lincoln Riley departed for USC.)	10	10
Oklahoma:		191–48	121–29				
Total:		191–48					
National championship Conference title Conference division title or championship game berth
^{†}Indicates BCS or CFP / New Years' Six bowl.; ^{#}Rankings from final Coaches Poll.; ^{°}Rankings from final AP Poll.

=== XFL/UFL ===
League	Team	Year	Regular season				Postseason			
League	Team	Year	Won	Lost	Win %	Finish	Won	Lost	Win %	Result
XFL	DAL	2020	2	3	.400	Season canceled	—	—	—	—
XFL	ARL	2023	4	6	.400	2nd XFL South	2	0	1.000	XFL Champion
UFL	ARL	2024	3	7	.300	4th XFL Conference	-	-	-	-
UFL	ARL	2025	5	5	.500	3rd XFL Conference	-	-	-	-
Total			14	21	.400		2	0	1.000	
