= 2013 Oklahoma Sooners football team =

American college football season

2013 Oklahoma Sooners football

Sugar Bowl champion

Sugar Bowl, W 45–31 vs. Alabama
- Conference: Big 12 Conference

Ranking
- Coaches: No. 6
- AP: No. 6
- Record: 11–2 (7–2 Big 12)
- Head coach: Bob Stoops (15th season)
- Co-offensive coordinators: Josh Heupel (3rd season); Jay Norvell (3rd season)
- Offensive scheme: No-huddle spread
- Defensive coordinator: Mike Stoops (7th season)
- Base defense: 3–4
- Captains: Aaron Colvin; Michael Hunnicutt; Gabe Ikard; Trey Millard; Corey Nelson; Austin Woods
- Home stadium: Gaylord Family Oklahoma Memorial Stadium

2013 Big 12 Conference football standings
	Conf.			Overall
Team	W		L	W		L
No. 13 Baylor $	8	–	1	11	–	2
No. 6 Oklahoma %	7	–	2	11	–	2
No. 17 Oklahoma State	7	–	2	10	–	3
Texas	7	–	2	8	–	5
Kansas State	5	–	4	8	–	5
Texas Tech	4	–	5	8	–	5
TCU	2	–	7	4	–	8
West Virginia	2	–	7	4	–	8
Iowa State	2	–	7	3	–	9
Kansas	1	–	8	3	–	9
$ – BCS representative as conference champion; % – BCS at-large representative; Rankings from AP Poll

The 2013 Oklahoma Sooners football team represented the University of Oklahoma in the 2013 NCAA Division I FBS football season, the 119th season of Sooner football. The team was led by two-time Walter Camp Coach of the Year Award winner, Bob Stoops, in his 15th season as head coach. They played their home games at Gaylord Family Oklahoma Memorial Stadium in Norman, Oklahoma. They were a charter member of the Big 12 Conference.

Conference play began at home on September 7 with a win against the West Virginia Mountaineers and ended in the annual Bedlam Series on December 7 against the Oklahoma State Cowboys in Stillwater with the Sooners upsetting the Cowboys 33–24 on the road. With the victory over the Kansas State Wildcats on November 23, head coach Bob Stoops got his 158th career win to move past Barry Switzer for the most wins in program history. After finishing the regular season with a record of 10–2 (7–2 in Big 12 play), finishing in a tie for second place in the conference, the Sooners received an at-large bid to play in the Sugar Bowl, where they upset the Alabama Crimson Tide with a final score of 45–31.

Prior to the season, the team received some media attention in May 2013, when the school self-reported that three players, two later revealed to be Gabe Ikard and Austin Woods, were said to have eaten too much pasta during a graduation ceremony (some sources dubbed this incident as “Pastagate”), and required the three players to donate $3.83 (cost of the pasta) to a charity, with Ikard and Woods donating $5 due to how good they believed the pasta was. The NCAA later issued a statement saying that Oklahoma had not committed a violation.

Following the season, Jalen Saunders and Aaron Colvin were selected in the fourth round of the 2014 NFL draft, along with Corey Nelson and Trey Millard in the seventh.

== Preseason ==
=== Recruits ===
College recruiting (2013)
Name	Hometown	School	Height	Weight	40^{‡}	Commit date
Dominique Alexander; ATH	Tulsa, Oklahoma	Booker T. Washington HS	6 ft 1 in (1.85 m)	193 lb (88 kg)	–	Nov 5, 2012
Dominique Alexander; ATH	Recruit ratings: Scout: Rivals: (75)					
Dakota Austin; DB	Lancaster, Texas	Lancaster HS	5 ft 11 in (1.80 m)	166 lb (75 kg)	4.5	Feb 2, 2013
Dakota Austin; DB	Recruit ratings: Scout: Rivals: (NR)					
Jed Barnett; K	Camas, Washington	Laney CC	6 ft 2 in (1.88 m)	215 lb (98 kg)	–	Nov 26, 2012
Jed Barnett; K	Recruit ratings: Scout: Rivals: (76)					
Austin Bennett; WR	Manvel, Texas	Manvel HS	6 ft 0 in (1.83 m)	170 lb (77 kg)	–	Jun 20, 2012
Austin Bennett; WR	Recruit ratings: Scout: Rivals: (75)					
Hatari Byrd; S	Fresno, California	Central HS East Campus	6 ft 2 in (1.88 m)	195 lb (88 kg)	4.6	Jul 31, 2012
Hatari Byrd; S	Recruit ratings: Scout: Rivals: (82)					
Dannon Cavil; WR	San Antonio, Texas	James Madison HS	6 ft 5 in (1.96 m)	205 lb (93 kg)	4.5	Jan 14, 2013
Dannon Cavil; WR	Recruit ratings: Scout: Rivals: (83)					
Christian Daimler; OT	Houston, Texas	Stratford HS	6 ft 6 in (1.98 m)	275 lb (125 kg)	5.18	Dec 19, 2012
Christian Daimler; OT	Recruit ratings: Scout: Rivals: (75)					
Matt Dimon; DE	Katy, Texas	Katy HS	6 ft 3 in (1.91 m)	250 lb (110 kg)	–	Mar 13, 2012
Matt Dimon; DE	Recruit ratings: Scout: Rivals: (82)					
Jordan Evans; DE/LB	Norman, Oklahoma	Norman North HS	6 ft 3 in (1.91 m)	205 lb (93 kg)	–	Nov 27, 2012
Jordan Evans; DE/LB	Recruit ratings: Scout: Rivals: (74)					
Tony Feo; OL	Pago Pago, American Samoa	Fullerton CC	6 ft 4 in (1.93 m)	275 lb (125 kg)	–	May 9, 2013
Tony Feo; OL	Recruit ratings: Scout: Rivals: (NR)					
Keith Ford; RB	Cypress, Texas	Cypress Ranch HS	5 ft 11 in (1.80 m)	195 lb (88 kg)	–	Mar 3, 2012
Keith Ford; RB	Recruit ratings: Scout: Rivals: (88)					
Kerrick Huggins; DT	Dallas, Texas	Skyline HS	6 ft 4 in (1.93 m)	285 lb (129 kg)	–	Dec 14, 2012
Kerrick Huggins; DT	Recruit ratings: Scout: Rivals: (79)					
L. J. Moore; DB	Fresno, California	Central HS	6 ft 1 in (1.85 m)	175 lb (79 kg)	–	Feb 6, 2013
L. J. Moore; DB	Recruit ratings: Scout: Rivals: (80)					
Ogbonnia Okoronkwo; DE	Houston, Texas	Alief Taylor HS	6 ft 3 in (1.91 m)	220 lb (100 kg)	4.6	Dec 12, 2012
Ogbonnia Okoronkwo; DE	Recruit ratings: Scout: Rivals: (76)					
Matthew Romar; DT	Port Arthur, Texas	Memorial HS	6 ft 3 in (1.91 m)	268 lb (122 kg)	–	Jan 28, 2013
Matthew Romar; DT	Recruit ratings: Scout: Rivals: (78)					
Quincy Russell; DT	San Antonio, Texas	Trinity Valley CC	6 ft 4 in (1.93 m)	311 lb (141 kg)	–	Dec 19, 2012
Quincy Russell; DT	Recruit ratings: Scout: Rivals: (79)					
Dionte Savage; OL	Flint, Michigan	Arizona Western CC	6 ft 5 in (1.96 m)	345 lb (156 kg)	–	Feb 4, 2013
Dionte Savage; OL	Recruit ratings: Scout: Rivals: (73)					
Jordan Smallwood; WR	Jenks, Oklahoma	Jenks HS	6 ft 2 in (1.88 m)	192 lb (87 kg)	–	Jun 7, 2012
Jordan Smallwood; WR	Recruit ratings: Scout: Rivals: (79)					
Josiah St. John; OL	Athens, Texas	Trinity Valley CC	6 ft 7 in (2.01 m)	305 lb (138 kg)	–	Dec 19, 2012
Josiah St. John; OL	Recruit ratings: Scout: Rivals: (83)					
Stanvon Taylor; ATH	Tulsa, Oklahoma	East Central HS	6 ft 0 in (1.83 m)	173 lb (78 kg)	4.5	May 4, 2012
Stanvon Taylor; ATH	Recruit ratings: Scout: Rivals: (83)					
Ahmad Thomas; DB	Miami, Florida	Miami Central HS	6 ft 1 in (1.85 m)	199 lb (90 kg)	–	May 23, 2012
Ahmad Thomas; DB	Recruit ratings: Scout: Rivals: (75)					
Cody Thomas; QB	Colleyville, Texas	Colleyville Heritage HS	6 ft 5 in (1.96 m)	220 lb (100 kg)	4.5	May 17, 2012
Cody Thomas; QB	Recruit ratings: Scout: Rivals: (83)					
Charles Walker; DT	Garland, Texas	South Garland HS	6 ft 4 in (1.93 m)	280 lb (130 kg)	–	Jan 13, 2013
Charles Walker; DT	Recruit ratings: Scout: Rivals: (79)					
D. J. Ward; DE	Moore, Oklahoma	Southmoore HS	6 ft 3 in (1.91 m)	245 lb (111 kg)	4.5	Apr 14, 2012
D. J. Ward; DE	Recruit ratings: Scout: Rivals: (83)					
K. J. Young; WR	Perris, California	Citrus Hill HS	6 ft 1 in (1.85 m)	182 lb (83 kg)	4.6	Jan 13, 2013
K. J. Young; WR	Recruit ratings: Scout: Rivals: (78)					
Overall recruit ranking: Scout: 15 Rivals: 15
‡ Refers to 40-yard dash; Note: In many cases, Scout, Rivals, 247Sports, On3, and ESPN may conflict in their listings of height, weight and 40 time.; In these cases, the average was taken. ESPN grades are on a 100-point scale.; Sources: "2013 Oklahoma Football Commitment List". Rivals.; "2013 Player Commitments – Oklahoma". ESPN.; "2013 Team Ranking". Rivals.com.

=== Award watch lists ===
- Fred Biletnikoff Award

Trey Metoyer
Jalen Saunders

- Lou Groza Award

Michael Hunnicutt

- Lombardi Award

Gabe Ikard

- Maxwell Award

Blake Bell

- Rimington Trophy

Gabe Ikard

- William V. Campbell Trophy

Gabe Ikard

== Schedule ==
Date	Time	Opponent	Rank	Site	TV	Result	Attendance
August 31	6:00 p.m.	Louisiana–Monroe*	No. 16	Gaylord Family Oklahoma Memorial Stadium; Norman, OK	FSN PPV	W 34–0	84,911
September 7	6:00 p.m.	West Virginia	No. 16	Gaylord Family Oklahoma Memorial Stadium; Norman, OK	FOX	W 16–7	84,692
September 14	11:00 a.m.	Tulsa*	No. 14	Gaylord Family Oklahoma Memorial Stadium; Norman, OK	ESPN2	W 51–20	84,229
September 28	2:30 p.m.	at No. 22 Notre Dame*	No. 14	Notre Dame Stadium; Notre Dame, IN	NBC	W 35–21	80,795
October 5	6:00 p.m.	TCU	No. 11	Gaylord Family Oklahoma Memorial Stadium; Norman, OK	FOX	W 20–17	84,992
October 12	11:00 a.m.	vs. Texas	No. 12	Cotton Bowl; Dallas, TX (Red River Rivalry)	ABC	L 20–36	92,500
October 19	2:30 p.m.	at Kansas	No. 18	Memorial Stadium; Lawrence, KS	ESPN	W 34–19	41,113
October 26	2:30 p.m.	No. 10 Texas Tech^{†}	No. 17	Gaylord Family Oklahoma Memorial Stadium; Norman, OK	FOX	W 38–30	84,734
November 7	6:30 p.m.	at No. 5 Baylor	No. 12	Floyd Casey Stadium; Waco, TX	FS1	L 12–41	50,537
November 16	11:00 a.m.	Iowa State	No. 22	Gaylord Family Oklahoma Memorial Stadium; Norman, OK	FS1	W 48–10	84,776
November 23	11:00 a.m.	at Kansas State	No. 22	Bill Snyder Family Football Stadium; Manhattan, KS	FS1	W 41–31	52,773
December 7	11:00 a.m.	at No. 6 Oklahoma State	No. 18	Boone Pickens Stadium; Stillwater, OK (Bedlam Series)	ABC	W 33–24	58,520
January 2, 2014	7:30 p.m.	vs. No. 3 Alabama*	No. 10	Mercedes-Benz Superdome; New Orleans, LA (Sugar Bowl)	ESPN	W 45–31	70,473
*Non-conference game; ^{†}Homecoming; Rankings from AP Poll released prior to the game; All times are in Central time

== Roster ==
2013 Oklahoma Sooners football team roster
Players
Coaches
Offense

Pos.	#	Name	Class
QB	1	Kendal Thompson	So
WR	3	Sterling Shepard	So
WR	5	Durron Neal	So
WR	6	Dannon Cavil	Fr
WR	8	Jalen Saunders	Sr
QB	9	Trevor Knight	Fr
QB	10	Blake Bell	Jr
WR	11	Lacoltan Bester	Sr
WR	12	Derrick Woods	Fr
QB	14	Cody Thomas	Fr
WR	16	Jaz Reynolds	Sr
WR	17	Trey Metoyer	So
RB	21	Keith Ford	Fr
RB	22	Roy Finch	Sr
RB	24	Brennan Clay	Sr
RB	25	David Smith	Fr
RB	26	Damien Williams	Sr
RB	28	Alex Ross	Fr
WR	29	Grant Bothun	So
FB	33	Trey Millard (injured) (C)	Sr
RB	35	Terence Olds	Jr
WR	40	Julian Winters	Jr
FB	41	Joe Palange	Fr
FB	48	Aaron Ripkowski	Jr
OL	50	Austin Woods (C)	Sr
OL	52	John-Philip Hughes	So
OL	53	Tony Feo	Jr
OL	54	Nila Kasitati	So
OL	55	Josiah St. John	Jr
OL	56	Ty Darlington	So
OL	64	Gabe Ikard (C)	Sr
OL	66	Riley Nolan	Fr
OL	68	Bronson Irwin	Sr
OL	70	Christian Daimler	Fr
OL	71	Tyrus Thompson	Jr
OL	72	Derek Farniok	So
OL	73	Dylan Hartsook	Fr
OL	74	Adam Shead	Jr
OL	75	Tyler Evans	Sr
OL	76	Jake Reed	Sr
OL	77	Dionte Savage	Jr
OL	78	Kyle Marrs	Fr
OT	79	Daryl Williams	Jr
WR	80	Jordan Smallwood	Fr
TE	81	Sam Grant	Fr
WR	81	Austin Brown	So
TE	82	Brannon Green	Sr
WR	83	Cody Barrow	So
WR	83	Austin Bennett	Fr
WR	84	Don Caudill	Sr
WR	85	K.J. Young	Fr
WR	86	Brandon Kitchens	Fr
WR	87	Zach Long	Fr
WR	88	Cody Chancellor	Fr
TE	88	Taylor McNamara	Fr
TE	89	Connor Knight	Fr
WR	89	Ashton Bennett	Fr

Defense

Pos.	#	Name	Class
DB	1	L.J. Moore	Fr
DB	2	Julian Wilson	Jr
DB	4	Hatari Byrd	Fr
DB	6	Stanvon Taylor	Fr
LB	7	Corey Nelson (injured) (C)	Sr
DB	9	Gabe Lynn	Sr
DB	10	Quentin Hayes	Jr
DB	13	Ahmad Thomas	Fr
DB	14	Aaron Colvin (C)	Sr
DB	15	Zack Sanchez	Fr
DB	18	Ahmad Thomas	Fr
LB	19	Eric Striker	So
LB	20	Frank Shannon	So
DB	22	Cortez Johnson	So
DB	23	Kass Everett	Sr
DB	24	Trey Franks	Jr
LB	25	Aaron Franklin	Jr
LB	26	Jordan Evans	Fr
DB	27	Dakota Austin	Fr
DE	29	Rashod Favors	Jr
LB	31	Londell Taylor	So
DB	32	Seth Carter	Sr
DB	34	Daniel Brooks	Fr
DB	38	Brandon Young	Jr
DB	39	Abdul Eissa	Jr
DE	40	P.L. Lindley	So
LB	42	Dominique Alexander	Fr
LB	43	Ruben Hunter	Fr
LB	45	Caleb Gastelum	Jr
DE	49	David Driskill	Jr
DT	67	Robert Hollis	So
DT	80	Jordan Phillips (injured)	So
DE	82	Ogbonnia Okoronkwo	Fr
DE	84	Mike Onuoha	So
DE	85	Geneo Grissom	Jr
DE	87	D. J. Ward	Fr
DE	90	Matt Dimon	Fr
DE	91	Charles Tapper	So
DT	92	Matthew Romar	Fr
DT	93	Jordan Wade	Fr
DT	94	Torrea Peterson	Jr
DT	95	Quincy Russell	Jr
DE	96	Mitch Tate	So
DT	97	Charles Walker	Fr
DE	98	Chuka Ndulue	Jr
DE	99	Chaz Nelson	Sr

Special teams

Pos.	#	Name	Class
K	18	Michael Hunnicutt (C)	Jr
P	37	Dylan Seibert	So
P	38	Jack Steed	Fr
K	39	Nick Hodgson	Jr
P	44	Jed Barnett	Jr
P	46	Jack Braught	Fr
K	47	Eric Hosek	So

Head coach

- Bob Stoops (15th season)

Coordinators/assistant coaches

- Mike Stoops – Associate head coach/defensive coordinator/defensive backs
- Josh Heupel – Co-offensive coordinator/quarterbacks
- Jay Norvell – Co-offensive coordinator/wide receivers
- Bobby Jack Wright – Assistant Head Coach/Cornerbacks
- Tim Kish – Assistant Defensive coordinator/linebackers
- Cale Gundy – Running backs/Full Backs/recruiting coordinator
- Bill Bedenbaugh – Offensive line
- Jerry Montgomery – Defensive line
- Jay Boulware – Tight ends/special teams coordinator
- Jerry Schmidt – Director of Sports Enhancement
- Matt McMillen – Administrative coordinator
- Merv Johnson – Director of football operations
- Reed Case – On-Campus Recruiting coordinator
- Joe Jon Finley – Offensive Graduate Assistant
- Joey Halzle – Offensive Graduate Assistant
- Ryan Walters – Defensive Graduate Assistant

Legend

- (C) Team captain
- (S) Suspended
- (I) Ineligible
- Injured
- Redshirt

== Depth chart ==
Defense

FS
Gabe Lynn
Hatari Byrd
⋅

NB	OLB	MLB	OLB
Julian Wilson	Dominique Alexander	Frank Shannon	Eric Striker
Kass Everett	Aaron Franklin	Jordan Evans	P.L. Lindley
⋅	⋅	⋅	⋅

SS
Quentin Hayes
Ahmad Thomas
⋅

CB
Aaron Colvin
Stanvon Taylor
Dakota Austin

DE	NT	DE
Chuka Ndulue	Jordan Wade	Charles Tapper
Geneo Grissom	Chuka Ndulue	Matt Dimon
Chaz Nelson	Torrea Peterson	⋅

CB
Zack Sanchez
Cortez Johnson
⋅

Offense

WR
Sterling Shepard/
Lacoltan Bester
Derrick Woods/
Durron Neal
K. J. Young/
Austin Bennett

LT	LG	C	RG	RT
Tyrus Thompson	Adam Shead	Gabe Ikard	Bronson Irwin	Daryl Williams
Derek Farniok	Dionte Savage	Ty Darlington	Nila Kasitati	Derek Farniok
Josiah St. John	John-Philip Hughes	Austin Woods	Tony Feo	Christian Daimler

TE
Brannon Green
Connor Knight
Taylor McNamara

WR
Jalen Saunders
Jaz Reynolds
Trey Franks

QB
Blake Bell
Trevor Knight
Kendal Thompson

RB
Brennan Clay
Roy Finch
Keith Ford
Alex Ross

FB
Trey Millard
Aaron Ripkowski
Joe Palange

Special teams
PK Michael Hunnicutt
PK Eric Hosek
P Jed Barnett
Nick Hodgsen
KR Brennan Clay
Roy Finch
PR Jalen Saunders
Sterling Shepard
LS Austin Woods (PAT/FG)
Connor Knight (Punts)
H Grant Bothun
Connor Knight

== Game summaries ==
=== Louisiana–Monroe ===
Louisiana–Monroe Warhawks at #16 Oklahoma Sooners – Game summary

Quarter	1	2	3	4	Total
Louisiana–Monroe	0	0	0	0	0
#16 Oklahoma	0	13	21	0	34

at Gaylord Family Oklahoma Memorial Stadium • Norman, OK

- Date: August 31, 2013
- Game time: 6:07 p.m. CDT
- Game weather: Temperature: 100 °F (38 °C) • Wind: SE 5 • Weather: Clear
- Game attendance: 84,911
- Referee: Referee: Scott Novak • Umpire: Tab Slaughter • Linesman: Doug Moore • Line judge: Kevin Vicknair • Back judge: Lyndon Nixon • Field judge: Nick Lave • Side judge: Eugene Hall
- TV announcers (FSOK PPV): Ron Thulin (Play-by-play), Dave Lapham (Color) & Chad McKee (Sideline)

Game information

Second Quarter

- OU – 11:15 Jalen Saunders 12 yd pass from Trevor Knight, Michael Hunnicutt XP good (OU 7–0)
- OU – 05:34 Michael Hunnicutt 41 Yard field goal (OU 10–0)
- OU – 00:39 Michael Hunnicutt 33 Yard field goal (OU 13–0)

Third Quarter

- OU – 10:42 Brennan Clay 8 yd run, Michael Hunnicutt XP good (OU 20–0)
- OU – 03:07 Jalen Saunders 18 yd pass from Trevor Knight, Michael Hunnicutt XP good (OU 27–0)
- OU – 00:38 Trey Metoyer 13 yd pass from Trevor Knight , Michael Hunnicutt XP good (OU 35–0)

Top Passers

- ULM – Kolton Browning 20/39, 128 yards
- OU – Trevor Knight 11/28, 86 yards, 3 TD, 1 INT

Top Rushers

- ULM – Jyruss Edwards 3 attempts, 9 yards
- OU – Trevor Knight 13 attempts, 112 yards

Top Receiving

- ULM – Rashon Ceaser 5 receptions, 39 yards
- OU – Jalen Saunders 3 receptions, 30 yards, 2 TD

Top Tacklers

- ULM – Cameron Blakes 9 tackles
- OU – Corey Nelson 5 tackles

=== West Virginia ===
West Virginia Mountaineers at #16 Oklahoma Sooners – Game summary

Quarter	1	2	3	4	Total
West Virginia	7	0	0	0	7
#16 Oklahoma	3	10	0	3	16

at Gaylord Family Oklahoma Memorial Stadium • Norman, OK

- Date: September 7, 2013
- Game time: 6:00 p.m. CDT
- Game weather: Temperature: 95 °F (35 °C) • Wind: ESE 8 • Weather: Clear
- Game attendance: 84,692
- Referee: Referee: Mike Defee • Umpire: Robert Richeson • Linesman: Al Green • Line judge: Walt Coleman IV • Back judge: Terry White • Field judge: Mike Cuttone • Side judge: Shane Standley
- TV announcers (FOX): Gus Johnson (Play-by-play), Charles Davis (Color) & Kristina Pink (Sideline)

Game information

First Quarter

- WVU – 08:54 Dreamius Smith 75 yd run, Josh Lambert XP good (WVU 7–0)
- OU – 04:22 Michael Hunnicutt 44 yd field goal (WVU 7–3)

Second Quarter

- OU – 13:35 Trey Millard 1 yd pass from Trevor Knight, Michael Hunnicutt XP Good (OU 10–7)
- OU – 00:11 Michael Hunnicutt 21 yd field goal (OU 13–7)

Fourth Quarter

- OU – 10:16 Michael Hunnicutt 32 yd field goal (OU 16–7)

Top Passers

- WVU – Paul Millard 21/41, 218 yards, 1 INT
- OU – Trevor Knight 10/20, 119 yards, 1 TD, 2 INT

Top Rushers

- WVU – Dreamius Smith 3 attempts, 77 yards, 1 TD
- OU – Brennan Clay 22 attempts, 170 yards

Top Receiving

- WVU – Kevin White 7 receptions, 80 yards
- OU – Jalen Saunders 4 receptions, 60 yards

Top Tackler

- WVU – Nick Kwiatoski 11 tackles
- OU – Quentin Hayes 8 tackles

=== Tulsa ===
Tulsa Golden Hurricane at #14 Oklahoma Sooners – Game summary

Quarter	1	2	3	4	Total
Tulsa	7	0	6	7	20
#14 Oklahoma	10	17	7	17	51

at Gaylord Family Oklahoma Memorial Stadium • Norman, OK

- Date: September 14, 2013
- Game time: 11:00 a.m. CDT
- Game weather: Temperature: 74 °F (23 °C) • Wind: ESE 15• Weather: Partly Cloudy
- Game attendance: 84,229
- Referee: Referee: Alan Eck • Umpire: John Mascarello • Linesman: Brad Edwards • Line judge: David Oliver • Back judge: Bran Van Park • Field judge: Scott Gaines • Side judge: Anthony Fleming
- TV announcers (ESPN2): Dave Flemming (Play-by-play), Ray Bentley (Color) & Lewis Johnson (Sideline)

Game information

First Quarter

- OU – 10:10 Brennan Clay 4 yd run, Michael Hunnicutt XP good (OU 7–0)
- OU – 05:09 Michael Hunnicutt 20 yd field goal (OU 10–0)
- TUL – 00:18 Trey Watts 2 yd run, Carl Salazar XP good (OU 10–7)

Second Quarter

- OU – 10:56 Sterling Shepard 3 yd pass from Blake Bell, Michael Hunnicutt XP Good (OU 17–7)
- OU – 07:12 Roy Finch 29 yd pass from Blake Bell, Michael Hunnicutt XP Good (OU 24–7)
- OU – 03:41 Michael Hunnicutt 30 yd field goal (OU 27–7)

Third Quarter

- OU – 12:34 Sterling Shepard 35 yd pass from Blake Bell, Michael Hunnicutt XP Good (OU 34–7)
- TUL – 09:16 Carl Salazar 26 yd field goal (OU 34–10)
- TUL – 04:46 Carl Salazar 21 yd field goal (OU 34–13)

Fourth Quarter

- OU – 14:53 Michael Hunnicutt 36 yd field goal (OU 37–13)
- TUL – 11:59 Ja'Terian Douglas 6 yd run, Carl Salazar XP good (OU 37–20)
- OU – 09:33 Jalen Saunders 25 yd pass from Blake Bell, Michael Hunnicutt XP Good (OU 44–20)
- OU – 02:35 Keith Ford 3 yd run, Michael Hunnicutt XP good (OU 51–20)

Top Passers

- TUL – Cody Green 17/33, 226 yards, 1 INT
- OU – Blake Bell 27/37, 413 yards, 4 TD

Top Rushers

- TUL – Trey Watts 14 attempts, 60 yards, 1 TD
- OU – Roy Finch 8 attempts, 68 yards

Top Receiving

- TUL – Jordan James 6 receptions, 100 yards
- OU – Sterling Shepard 8 receptions, 123 yards, 2 TD

Top Tackler

- TUL – Shawn Jackson 15 tackles
- OU – Frank Shannon 10 tackles

=== Notre Dame ===
#14 Oklahoma Sooners at #22 Notre Dame Fighting Irish – Game summary

Quarter	1	2	3	4	Total
#14 Oklahoma	14	7	6	8	35
#22 Notre Dame	7	0	7	7	21

at Notre Dame Stadium • Notre Dame, IN

- Date: September 28, 2013
- Game time: 2:42 p.m. CDT
- Game weather: Temperature: 79 °F (26 °C) • Wind: S 14 • Weather: Mostly Sunny
- Game attendance: 80,795
- Referee: Referee: Randy Christal • Umpire: Jim Adams • Linesman: Cal McNeill • Line judge: Kelly Deterding • Back judge: Terry Jones • Field judge: Joe Blubaugh • Side judge: Freeman Johns
- TV announcers (NBC): Dan Hicks (Play-by-play), Mike Mayock (Color) & Alex Flanagan (Sideline)

Game information

First Quarter

- OU – 14:11 Corey Nelson 46 yard interception return, Michael Hunnicutt XP good (OU 7–0)
- OU – 12:15 Damien Williams 11 yd run, Michael Hunnicutt XP good (OU 14–0)
- ND – 04:03 T. J. Jones 6 yd pass from Tommy Rees, Kyle Brindza XP Good (OU 14–7)

Second Quarter

- OU – 00:43 Lacoltan Bester 26 yd pass from Blake Bell, Michael Hunnicutt XP Good (OU 21–7)

Third Quarter

- ND – 12:31 George Atkinson III 80 yd run, Kyle Brindza XP good (OU 21–14)
- OU – 08:11 Michael Hunnicutt 27 yd field goal (OU 24–14)
- OU – 02:43 Michael Hunnicutt 19 yd field goal (OU 27–14)

Fourth Quarter

- ND – 14:10 Troy Niklas 30 yd pass from Tommy Rees, Kyle Brindza XP Good (OU 27–21)
- OU – 12:24 Sterling Shepard 54 yd pass from Blake Bell, Sterling Shepard pass from Blake Bell (OU 35–21)

Top Passers

- OU – Blake Bell 22/30, 232 yards, 2 TD
- ND – Tommy Reiss 9/24, 104 yards, 2 TD, 3 INT

Top Rushers

- OU – Brennan Clay 14 attempts, 77 yards
- ND – George Atkinson III 14 attempts, 148 yards, 1 TD

Top Receiving

- OU – Sterling Shepard 5 receptions, 83 yards, 1 TD
- ND – Troy Niklas 2 receptions, 43 yards, 1 TD

Top Tackler

- OU – Frank Shannon 8 tackles
- ND – Carlo Calabrese 15 tackles

=== TCU ===
TCU Horned Frogs at #11 Oklahoma Sooners – Game summary

Quarter	1	2	3	4	Total
TCU	0	0	10	7	17
#11 Oklahoma	3	10	0	7	20

at Gaylord Family Oklahoma Memorial Stadium • Norman, OK

- Date: October 5, 2013
- Game time: 6:00 p.m. CDT
- Game weather: Temperature: 63 °F (17 °C) • Wind: NNW 12 • Weather: Clear
- Game attendance: 84,992
- Referee: Referee: Dan Romeo • Umpire: Scott Teifer • Linesman: Rick Smith • Line judge: Marc Bovos • Back judge: Chris Alston • Field judge: Bobby Benard • Side judge: Craig Falkner
- TV announcers (FOX): Gus Johnson (Play-by-play), Charles Davis (Color) & Kristina Pink (Sideline)

Game information

First Quarter

- OU – 02:45 Michael Hunnicutt 39 yd field goal (OU 3–0)

Second Quarter

- OU – 02:29 Trey Millard 8 yd run, Michael Hunnicutt XP good (OU 10–0)
- OU – 00:00 Michael Hunnicutt 37 yd field goal (OU 13–0)

Third Quarter

- TCU – 03:32 Jaden Oberkrom 25 yd field goal (OU 13–3)
- TCU – 00:08 Trevone Boykin 2 yd run, Jaden Oberkrom XP good (OU 13–10)

Fourth Quarter

- OU – 04:37 Brennan Clay 76 yd run, Michael Hunnicutt XP good (OU 20–10)
- TCU – 02:26 Trevone Boykin 8 yd run, Jaden Oberkrom XP good (OU 20–17)

Top Passers

- TCU – Trevone Boykin 16/26, 166 yards
- OU – Blake Bell 20/31, 152 yards

Top Rushers

- TCU – Waymon James 6 attempts, 22 yards
- OU – Brennan Clay 9 attempts, 111 yards, 1 TD

Top Receiving

- TCU – Ty Slania 6 receptions, 38 yards
- OU – Durron Neal 4 receptions, 42 yards

Top Tackler

- TCU – Chris Hackett 11 tackles
- OU – Frank Shannon 7 tackles

=== Texas (Red River Rivalry) ===
#12 Oklahoma Sooners vs Texas Longhorns – Game summary

Quarter	1	2	3	4	Total
#12 Oklahoma	3	7	3	7	20
Texas	10	13	13	0	36

at Cotton Bowl • Dallas, TX

- Date: October 12, 2013
- Game time: 11:06 a.m. CDT
- Game weather: Temperature: 80 °F (27 °C) • Wind: SW 15–20 • Weather: Cloudy
- Game attendance: 92,500
- Referee: Referee: Greg Burks • Umpire: Scott Campbell • Linesman: George Gusman • Line judge: David Oliver • Back judge: Brian Ernest • Field judge: Randy Smith • Side judge: Gene Semko
- TV announcers (ABC): Brent Musburger (Play-by-play), Todd Blackledge (Color) & Heather Cox (Sideline)

Game information

First Quarter

- TEX – 10:13 Anthony Fera 31 yd field goal (TEX 3–0)
- OU – 06:53 Michael Hunnicutt 34 yd field goal (Tied 3–3)
- TEX – 02:29 Chris Whaley 31 yard interception return, Anthony Fera XP good (TEX 10–3)

Second Quarter

- TEX – 08:46 Marcus Johnson 59 yd pass from Case McCoy, Anthony Fera XP Good (TEX 17–3)
- TEX – 03:22 Anthony Fera 50 yd field goal (TEX 20–3)
- OU – 01:06 Damien Williams 3 yd run, Michael Hunnicutt XP good (TEX 20–10)
- TEX – 00:00 Anthony Fera 43 yd field goal (TEX 23–10)

Third Quarter

- OU – 11:08 Michael Hunnicutt 37 yd field goal (TEX 23–13)
- TEX – 07:22 Daje Johnson 85 yd punt return, Anthony Fera XP Blocked (TEX 29–13)
- TEX – 00:21 Mike Davis 38 yd pass from Case McCoy, Anthony XP Good (TEX 36–13)

Fourth Quarter

- OU – 10:07 Geneo Grissom 54 yard interception return, Michael Hunnicutt XP good (TEX 36–20)

Top Passers

- OU – Blake Bell 12/26, 133 yards, 2 INT
- TEX – Case McCoy 13/21, 190 yards, 2 TD, 1 INT

Top Rushers

- OU – Keith Ford 6 attempts, 34 yards
- TEX – Johnathan Gray 29 attempts, 123 yards

Top Receiving

- OU – Lacoltan Bester 5 receptions, 70 yards
- TEX – Jaxon Shipley 5 receptions, 59 yards

Top Tackler

- OU – Dominique Alexander 19 tackles
- TEX – Adrian Phillips 9 tackles

=== Kansas ===
#18 Oklahoma Sooners at Kansas Jayhawks – Game summary

Quarter	1	2	3	4	Total
#18 Oklahoma	0	18	7	9	34
Kansas	7	6	0	6	19

at Memorial Stadium • Lawrence, KS

- Date: October 19, 2013
- Game time: 2:35 p.m. CDT
- Game weather: Temperature: 61 °F (16 °C) • Wind: WSW 13 • Weather: Sunny
- Game attendance: 41,113
- Referee: Referee: Reggie Smith • Umpire: Michael Cooper • Linesman: Mike Moeller • Line judge: Frank LeBlanc • Back judge: Lyndon Nixon • Field judge: Jack G. Taylor III • Side judge: Tim Murray
- TV announcers (ESPN): Mark Jones (Play-by-play), Brock Huard (Color) & Kaylee Hartung (Sideline)

Game information

First Quarter

- KU – 08:23 Jimmay Mundine 1 yd pass from Jake Heaps, Matthew Wyman XP good (KU 7–0)

Second Quarter

- KU – 14:49 James Sims 2 yd run, Matthew Wyman XP no good (KU 13–0)
- OU – 07:05 Jaz Reynolds 16 yd pass from Blake Bell, Michael Hunnicutt XP no good (KU 13–6)
- OU – 04:42 Team safety (KU 13–8)
- OU – 07:05 Sterling Shepard 45 yd pass from Lacoltan Bester, Michael Hunnicutt XP good (OU 15–13)
- OU – 00:11 Michael Hunnicutt 37 yd field goal (OU 18–13)

Third Quarter

- OU – 10:47 Sterling Shepard 10 yd pass from Blake Bell, Michael Hunnicutt XP good (OU 25–13)

Fourth Quarter

- KU – 10:15 James Sims 6 yd run, Matthew Wyman XP blocked (OU 25–19)
- OU – 10:15 Aaron Colvin PAT return (OU 27–19)
- OU – 04:19 Damien Williams 6 yd run, Michael Hunnicutt XP good (OU 34–19)

Top Passers

- OU – Blake Bell 15/25, 131 yards, 2 TD, 1 INT
- KU – Jake Heaps 5/13, 16 yards, 1 TD

Top Rushers

- OU – Damien Williams 15 attempts, 56 yards, 1 TD
- KU – James Sims 23 attempts, 129 yards, 2 TD

Top Receiving

- OU – Sterling Shepard 7 receptions, 82 yards, 2 TD
- KU – Justin McCay 1 reception, 10 yards

Top Tackler

- OU – Aaron Colvin 8 tackles
- KU – Dexter Linton 9 tackles

=== Texas Tech ===
#10 Texas Tech Red Raiders at #17 Oklahoma Sooners – Game summary

Quarter	1	2	3	4	Total
#10 Texas Tech	7	0	17	6	30
#17 Oklahoma	0	14	14	10	38

at Gaylord Family Oklahoma Memorial Stadium • Norman, OK

- Date: October 26, 2013
- Game time: 3:46 p.m. CDT
- Game weather: Temperature: 59 °F (15 °C) • Wind: S 5 • Weather: Cloudy
- Game attendance: 84,734
- Referee: Referee: Mike Defee • Umpire: Robert Richeson • Linesman: Al Green • Line judge: Walt Coleman IV • Back judge: Terry White • Field judge: Mike Cuttone • Side judge: Shane Standley
- TV announcers (FOX): Gus Johnson (Play-by-play), Charles Davis (Color) & Kristina Pink (Sideline)

Game information

First Quarter

- TTU – 03:38 Eric Ward 3 yd pass from Kenny Williams, Ryan Bustin XP good (TTU 7–0)

Second Quarter

- OU – 05:55 Jalen Saunders 15 yd pass from Blake Bell, Michael Hunnicutt XP good (Tied 7–7)
- OU – 03:55 Jalen Saunders 76 yd pass from Blake Bell, Michael Hunnicutt XP good (OU 14–7)

Third Quarter

- OU – 09:37 Damien Williams 3 yd run, Michael Hunnicutt XP good (OU 21–7)
- TTU – 08:37 Eric Ward 23 yd pass from Davis Webb, Ryan Bustin XP good (OU 21–14)
- TTU – 03:59 Ryan Bustin 34 yd field goal (OU 21–17)
- TTU – 03:08 Jakeem Grant 17 yd pass from Davis Webb, Ryan Bustin XP good (TTU 24–21)
- OU – 00:33 LaColtan Bester 35 yd run, Michael Hunnicutt XP good (OU 28–24)

Fourth Quarter

- OU – 11:04 Damien Williams 3 yd run, Michael Hunnicutt XP good (OU 35–24)
- TTU – 07:13 Kenny Williams 1 yd run, Davis Webb pass failed (OU 35–30)
- OU – 01:17 Michael Hunnicutt 37 yd field goal (OU 38–30)

Top Passers

- TTU – Davis Webb 33/53, 385 yards, 2 TD, 2 INT
- OU – Blake Bell 14/22, 249 yards, 2 TD

Top Rushers

- TTU – DeAndre Washington 10 attempts, 56 yards
- OU – Damien Williams 19 attempts, 97 yards, 2 TD

Top Receiving

- TTU – Jace Amaro 8 receptions, 119 yards
- OU – Jalen Saunders 6 receptions, 153 yards, 2 TD

Top Tackler

- TTU – Tre' Porter 13 tackles
- OU – Gabe Lynn 9 tackles

=== Baylor ===
#12 Oklahoma Sooners at #5 Baylor Bears – Game summary

Quarter	1	2	3	4	Total
#12 Oklahoma	0	5	7	0	12
#5 Baylor	3	21	10	7	41

at Floyd Casey Stadium • Waco, TX

- Date: November 7, 2013
- Game time: 6:35 p.m. CST
- Game weather: Temperature: 54 °F (12 °C) • Wind: Calm • Weather: Fair Skies
- Game attendance: 50,537
- Referee: Referee: Mike Defee • Umpire: Robert Richeson • Linesman: Al Green • Line judge: Walt Coleman IV • Back judge: Terry White • Field judge: Mike Cuttone • Side judge: Eugene Hall
- TV announcers (FS1): Justin Kutcher (Play-by-play), Joel Klatt (Color), Petros Papadakis (Color) & Kristina Pink (Sideline)

Game information

First Quarter

- BAY – 07:09 Aaron Jones 29 yd field goal (BAY 3–0)

Second Quarter

- OU – 13:22 Dominique Alexander safety (BAY 3–2)
- OU – 12:09 Michael Hunnicutt 22 yd field goal (OU 5–3)
- BAY – 07:02 Bryce Petty 5 yd run, Aaron Jones XP good (BAY 10–5)
- BAY – 01:00 Bryce Petty 1 yd run, Aaron Jones XP good (BAY 17–5)
- BAY – 00:13 Antwan Goodley 24 yd pass from Bryce Petty, Aaron Jones XP good (BAY 24–5)

Third Quarter

- BAY – 08:14 Levi Norwood 17 yd pass from Bryce Petty, Aaron Jones XP good (BAY 31–5)
- OU – 03:20 Roy Finch 10 yd pass from Blake Bell, Michael Hunnicutt XP good (BAY 31–12)
- BAY – 01:17 Aaron Jones 40 yd field goal (BAY 34–12)

Fourth Quarter

- BAY – 09:03 Antwan Goodley 25 yd pass from Bryce Petty, Aaron Jones XP good (BAY 41–12)

Top Passers

- OU – Blake Bell 15/35, 150 yards, 1 TD, 2 INT
- BAY – Bryce Petty 13/26, 204 yards, 3 TD

Top Rushers

- OU – Roy Finch 7 attempts, 36 yards
- BAY – Shock Linwood 23 attempts, 182 yards

Top Receiving

- OU – Jalen Saunders 6 receptions, 74 yards
- BAY – Antwan Goodley 6 receptions, 80 yards, 2 TD

Top Tackler

- OU – Frank Shannon 15 tackles
- BAY – Ahmad Dixon 10 tackles

=== Iowa State ===
Iowa State Cyclones at #22 Oklahoma Sooners – Game summary

Quarter	1	2	3	4	Total
Iowa State	0	10	0	0	10
#22 Oklahoma	0	10	17	21	48

at Gaylord Family Oklahoma Memorial Stadium • Norman, OK

- Date: November 16, 2013
- Game time: 11:00 a.m. CST
- Game weather: Temperature: 64 °F (18 °C) • Wind: S 25 • Weather: Partly Cloudy
- Game attendance: 84,776
- Referee: Referee: Dan Romeo • Umpire: Jim Adams • Linesman: Rick Smith • Line judge: Marc Bovos • Back judge: Chris Alston • Field judge: Bobby Bernard • Side judge: Craig Faulkner
- TV announcers (FS1): Adam Alexander (Play-by-play) & Chris Simms (Color)

Game information

First Quarter
Second Quarter

- ISU – 14:18 Sam B. Richardson 4 yd run, Cole Netten XP good (ISU 7–0)
- OU – 07:32 Michael Hunnicutt 22 yd field goal (ISU 7–3)
- ISU – 05:52 Cole Netten 29 yd field goal (ISU 10–3)
- OU – 01:09 Jalen Saunders 91 yd punt return, Michael Hunnicutt XP good (Tied 10–10)

Third Quarter

- OU – 14:17 Damien Williams 69 yd run, Michael Hunnicutt XP good (OU 17–10)
- OU – 07:50 Michael Hunnicutt 32 yd field goal (OU 20–10)
- OU – 03:59 Brennan Clay 63 yd run, Michael Hunnicutt XP good (OU 27–10)

Fourth Quarter

- OU – 14:49 Trevor Knight 56 yd run, Michael Hunnicutt XP good (OU 34–10)
- OU – 09:32 Damien Williams 19 yd run, Michael Hunnicutt XP good (OU 41–10)
- OU – 03:56 Aaron Ripkowski 3 yd pass from Kendal Thompson, Michael Hunnicutt XP good (OU 48–10)

Top Passers

- ISU – Grant Rohach 21/34, 179 yards, 2 INT
- OU – Trevor Knight 8/14, 61 yards

Top Rushers

- ISU – Aaron Wimberly 13 attempts, 50 yards
- OU – Damien Williams 10 attempts, 128 yards, 2 TD

Top Receiving

- ISU – Quenton Bundrage 6 receptions, 66 yards
- OU – LaColtan Bester 4 receptions, 75 yards

Top Tackler

- ISU – Jacques Washington 13 tackles
- OU – Dominique Alexander 11 tackles

=== Kansas State ===
#22 Oklahoma Sooners at Kansas State Wildcats – Game summary

Quarter	1	2	3	4	Total
#22 Oklahoma	7	17	3	14	41
Kansas State	0	21	3	7	31

at Bill Snyder Family Football Stadium • Manhattan, KS

- Date: November 23, 2013
- Game time: 11:05 a.m. CST
- Game weather: Temperature: 25 °F (−4 °C) • Wind: NNE 7–18 • Weather: Mostly Cloudy
- Game attendance: 52,773
- Referee: Referee: Alan Eck • Umpire: Scott Campbell • Linesman: Al Green • Line judge: David Oliver • Back judge: Bran Van Park • Field judge: Scott Gaines • Side judge: Anthony Fleming
- TV announcers (FS1): Craig Bolerjack (Play-by-play), Joey Harrington (Color) & Ryan Nece (Sideline)

Game information

First Quarter

- OU – 08:26 Sterling Shepard 12 yd pass from Trevor Knight, Michael Hunnicutt XP good (OU 7–0)

Second Quarter

- OU – 10:58 Trevor Knight 8 yd run, Michael Hunnicutt XP good (OU 14–0)
- KSU – 10:05 Tyler Lockett 48 yd pass from Jake Waters, Ian Patterson XP good (OU 14–7)
- KSU – 05:26 Tyler Lockett 30 yd pass from Jake Waters, Ian Patterson XP good (Tied 14–14)
- OU – 04:06 Brennan Clay 64 yd run, Michael Hunnicutt XP good (OU 21–14)
- KSU – 03:40 Tyler Lockett 90 yd pass from Jake Waters, Ian Patterson XP good (Tied 21–21)
- OU – 00:02 Michael Hunnicutt 30 yd field goal (OU 24–21)

Third Quarter

- OU – 10:23 Michael Hunnicutt 37 yd field goal (OU 27–21)
- KSU – 05:12 Ian Patterson 28 yd field goal (OU 27–24)

Fourth Quarter

- OU – 12:55 Brennan Clay 3 yd run, Michael Hunnicutt XP good (OU 34–24)
- OU – 11:47 Zack Sanchez 74 interception return, Michael Hunnicutt XP good (OU 41–24)
- KSU – 06:10 Jake Waters 1 yd run, Ian Patterson XP good (OU 41–31)

Top Passers

- OU – Trevor Knight 14/20, 171 yards, 1 TD, 1 INT
- KSU – Jake Waters 17/29, 348 yards, 3 TD, 2 INT

Top Rushers

- OU – Brennan Clay 31 attempts, 200 yards, 2 TD
- KSU – John Hubert 9 attempts, 23 yards

Top Receiving

- OU – Jalen Saunders 7 receptions, 95 yards
- KSU – Tyler Lockett 12 receptions, 278 yards, 3 TD

Top Tackler

- OU – Quentin Hayes 7 tackles
- KSU – Jonathan Truman 13 tackles

=== Oklahoma State (Bedlam Series) ===
#18 Oklahoma Sooners at #6 Oklahoma State Cowboys – Game summary

Quarter	1	2	3	4	Total
#18 Oklahoma	7	3	7	16	33
#6 Oklahoma State	7	3	7	7	24

at Boone Pickens Stadium • Stillwater, OK

- Date: December 7, 2013
- Game time: 11:07 a.m. CST
- Game weather: Temperature: 16 °F (−9 °C) • Wind: NNE 10 • Weather: Sunny
- Game attendance: 58,520
- Referee: Referee: Greg Burks • Umpire: Scott Campbell • Linesman: Al Green • Line judge: Walt Coleman IV • Back judge: Brad Van Vark • Field judge: Mike Cuttone • Side judge: Gene Semko
- TV announcers (ABC): Sean McDonough (Play-by-play), Chris Spielman (Color) & Shannon Spake (Sideline)

Game information

First Quarter

- OSU – 04:00 Desmond Roland 1 yd run, Ben Grogan XP good (OSU 7–0)
- OU – 00:18 Jalen Saunders 64 yd punt return, Michael Hunnicutt XP good (Tied 7–7)

Second Quarter

- OSU – 13:18 Ben Grogen 41 yd field goal (OSU 10–7)
- OU – 00:38 Michael Hunnicutt 21 yd field goal (Tied 10–10)

Third Quarter

- OSU – 13:18 Desmond Roland 15 yd pass from Clint Chelf, Ben Grogan XP good (OSU 17–10)
- OU – 02:35 Michael Hunnicutt 8 yd pass from Grant Bothun, Michael Hunnicutt XP good (Tied 17–17)

Fourth Quarter

- OU – 10:01 Michael Hunnicutt 39 yd field goal (OU 20–17)
- OSU – 01:46 Desmond Roland 1 yd run, Ben Grogan XP good (OSU 24–20)
- OU – 00:19 Jalen Saunders 7 yd pass from Blake Bell, Michael Hunnicutt XP good (OU 27–24)
- OU – 00:00 Eric Striker 3 yd fumble recovery (OU 33–24)

Top Passers

- OU – Blake Bell 10/16, 140 yards, 1 TD
- OSU – Clint Chelf 19/35, 200 yards, 1 TD, 1 INT

Top Rushers

- OU – Brennan Clay 24 attempts, 70 yards
- OSU – Desmond Roland 21 attempts, 144 yards, 2 TD

Top Receiving

- OU – Sterling Shepard 7 receptions, 112 yards
- OSU – Josh Stewart 7 receptions, 68 yards

Top Tackler

- OU – Dominique Alexander 10 tackles
- OSU – Daytawion Lowe 9 tackles

=== Alabama (Sugar Bowl) ===
#10 Oklahoma Sooners vs #3 Alabama Crimson Tide – Game summary

Quarter	1	2	3	4	Total
#10 Oklahoma	14	17	0	14	45
#3 Alabama	10	7	7	7	31

at Mercedes-Benz Superdome • New Orleans, LA

- Date: January 2, 2014
- Game time: 7:32 p.m. CST
- Game weather: Indoors
- Game attendance: 70,473
- Referee: Referee: Brad Allen • Umpire: Tom Laverty • Linesman: Arthur Hardin • Line judge: Danny Short • Back judge: Gary Dancewicz • Field judge: Mike Cullin • Side judge: Watts Key
- TV announcers (ESPN): Brad Nessler (Play-by-play), Todd Blackledge (Color) & Holly Rowe (Sideline)

Game information

First Quarter

- ALA – 13:11 T. J. Yeldon 1 yd run, Cade Foster XP good (ALA 7–0)
- OU – 09:43 Lacoltan Bester 45 yd pass from Trevor Knight, Michael Hunnicutt XP good (Tied 7–7)
- ALA – 07:02 Cade Foster 27 yd field goal (ALA 10–7)
- OU – 01:53 Jalen Saunders 8 yd pass from Trevor Knight, Michael Hunnicutt XP good (OU 14–10)

Second Quarter

- ALA – 14:03 DeAndrew White 67 yd pass from A. J. McCarron, Cade Foster XP good (ALA 17–14)
- OU – 11:45 Michael Hunnicutt 47 yd field goal (Tied 17–17)
- OU – 02:59 Jalen Saunders 43 yd pass from Trevor Knight, Michael Hunnicutt XP good (OU 24–17)
- OU – 01:05 Sterling Shepard 13 yd run, Michael Hunnicutt XP good (OU 31–17)

Third Quarter

- ALA – 08:49 Derrick Henry 43 yd run, Cade Foster XP good (OU 31–24)

Fourth Quarter

- OU – 10:44 Sterling Shepard 9 yd pass from Trevor Knight, Michael Hunnicutt XP good (OU 38–24)
- ALA – 06:22 Derrick Henry 61 yd pass from A. J. McCarron, Cade Foster XP good (OU 38–31)
- OU – 00:47 Geneo Grissom 8 yd fumble recovery, Michael Hunnicutt XP good (OU 45–31)

Top Passers

- OU – Trevor Knight 32/44, 348 yards, 4 TD, 1 INT
- ALA – A. J. McCarron 19/30, 387 yards, 2 TD, 2 INT

Top Rushers

- OU – Brennan Clay 17 attempts, 44 yards
- ALA – Derrick Henry 8 attempts, 100 yards, 1 TD

Top Receiving

- OU – Lacoltan Bester 6 receptions, 105 yards, 1 TD
- ALA – DeAndrew White 3 receptions, 139 yards, 1 TD

Top Tackler

- OU – Eric Striker 7 tackles
- ALA – Eddie Jackson 10 tackles

== Rankings ==
Ranking movements Legend: ██ Increase in ranking ██ Decrease in ranking
	Week																
Poll	Pre	1	2	3	4	5	6	7	8	9	10	11	12	13	14	15	Final
AP	16	16	14	14	14	11	12	18	17	13	12	22	22	20	18	11	6
Coaches	16	15	13	12	12	10	10	18	12	9	8	17	18	17	15	10	6
Harris	Not released							17	14	10	10	20	21	19	16	10	Not released
BCS	Not released								15	10	10	18	20	18	17	11	Not released

== Statistics ==
=== Team ===
	OU	Opp
Points per Game	32.8	22.1
First downs	280	233
Rushing	155	92
Passing	106	118
Penalty	19	23
Rushing Yardage	2,911	1,789
Rushing Attempts	559	437
Avg per Rush	5.2	4.1
Avg per Game	223.9	137.6
Passing Yardage	2,588	2,763
Avg per Game	199.1	212.5
Completions-Attempts	225-383 (58.7%)	225-409 (55%)
Total Offense	5,499	4,552
Total Plays	942	846
Avg per Play	5.8	5.4
Avg per Game	423	350.2
Fumbles-Lost	17-5	14-9

	OU	Opp
Punts-Yards	67-2,746 (41 avg)	76-3,049 (40.1 avg)
Punt returns-Total Yards	23-326 (14.2 avg)	20-312 (15.6 avg)
Kick returns-Total Yards	34-761 (22.4 avg)	36-838 (23.3 avg)
Onside Kicks	1-1 (100%)	1-2 (50%)
Avg Time of Possession per Game	32:18	27:42
Penalties-Yards	87-723	73-632
Avg per Game	55.6	48.6
3rd Down Conversions	77/195 (39.5%)	60/178 (33.7%)
4th Down Conversions	11/16 (68.8%)	5/14 (35.7%)
Sacks By-Yards	33-204	15-109
Total TDs	50	36
Rushing	19	17
Passing	24	17
Fields Goals-Attempts	24-27 (88.9%)	13-16 (81.3%)
PAT-Attempts	47-48 (97.9%)	32-35 (91.4%)
Total Attendance	508,334	283,738
Games-Avg per Game	6-84,722	5-56,748

- Lowest fourth down conversion rate allowed since 2003
- Highest average time of possession since 2004
- Least passing first downs and passing yards and lowest average margin of victory (10.7), third down conversion rate and total attendance since 2005
- Least first downs, third down conversions, total offense, total plays, passing yards per game, passing touchdowns, pass completions and attempts since 2006
- Lowest average punt since 2008
- Highest passing completion percentage and kick return average allowed since 2008

=== Scores by quarter ===
	1	2	3	4	Total
Opponents	65	81	80	61	287
Oklahoma	61	148	92	126	427

- Least third quarter points scored since 2005
- Most first quarter points allowed since 2006
- Most fourth quarter points scored since 2007
- Most third quarter points allowed since 2008

== Postseason ==
=== Awards ===
Freshman Dominique Alexander was named Big 12 Conference Defensive Freshman of the Year.

=== All-Americans ===
Oklahoma's only All-American this year was Gabe Ikard. He was given first team All-American status by the American Football Coaches Association (AFCA), Walter Camp Foundation (WCFF), and CBS Sports (CBS).

=== All Big 12 team ===
All-Big 12 First Team
- Gabe Ikard, Sr., C, 3rd year
- Trey Millard, Sr., FB, 3rd year
- Charles Tapper, So., DL
- Aaron Colvin, Sr., DB, 2nd year

Second Team
- Jalen Saunders, Sr., WR
- Daryl Williams, Jr., OL
- Michael Hunnicutt Jr., PK
- Eric Striker So., LB

Honorable Mention
- Gabe Lynn, Sr., DB
- Frank Shannon, So., LB
- Gabe Ikard, Sr., OL (offensive lineman of the year)
- Bob Stoops (Coach of the Year)

=== 2014 NFL draft ===
The 2014 NFL draft was held at Radio City Music Hall in New York City on May 8–10, 2014. The following Oklahoma players were either selected or signed as free agents following the draft.

Player	Position	Round	Overall pick	NFL team
Jalen Saunders	WR	4th	104	New York Jets
Aaron Colvin	CB	4th	114	Jacksonville Jaguars
Corey Nelson	LB	7th	242	Denver Broncos
Trey Millard	FB	7th	245	San Francisco 49ers
Brennan Clay	RB	Undrafted		Denver Broncos
Gabe Lynn	DB	Undrafted		Detroit Lions
Lacolton Bester	WR	Undrafted		Houston Texans
Damien Williams	RB	Undrafted		Miami Dolphins
Roy Finch	RB	Undrafted		New England Patriots
Bronson Irwin	OL	Undrafted		Seattle Seahawks
Gabe Ikard	C	Undrafted		Tennessee Titans
Jaz Reynolds	WR	Undrafted		Tennessee Titans
