= 2012 All-Big 12 Conference football team =

The 2012 All-Big 12 Conference football team consists of American football players chosen as All-Big 12 Conference players for the 2012 Big 12 Conference football season. The conference recognizes two official All-Big 12 selectors: (1) the Big 12 conference coaches selected separate offensive and defensive units and named first- and second-team players (the "Coaches" team); and (2) a panel of sports writers and broadcasters covering the Big 12 also selected offensive and defensive units and named first- and second-team players (the "Media" team).

== Offensive selections ==
=== Quarterbacks ===
- Collin Klein, Kansas State (Coaches-1; Media-1)
- Geno Smith, West Virginia (Coaches-2 (tie); Media-2)
- Landry Jones, Oklahoma (Coaches-2 (tie))

=== Running backs ===
- Joseph Randle, Oklahoma State (Coaches-1; Media-1)
- John Hubert, K-State (Coaches-1)
- James Sims, Kansas (Coaches-2; Media-2)
- Damien Williams, Oklahoma (Coaches-2)

=== Fullbacks ===
- Trey Millard, Oklahoma (Coaches-1)
- Kye Staley, Oklahoma State (Coaches-2)

=== Centers ===
- Gabe Ikard, Oklahoma (Coaches-1, Media-1)
- Joe Madsen, West Virginia (Media-2; Coaches-2)

=== Guards ===
- Cyril Richardson, Baylor (Coaches-1; Media-1)
- Lane Taylor, Oklahoma State (Coaches-1; Media-1)
- B. J. Finney, Kansas State (Media-1)
- Blaize Foltz, TCU (Coaches-2; Media-2)
- Trey Hopkins, Texas (Coaches-2)
- Ivory Wade, Baylor (Media-2)

=== Tackles ===
- LaAdrian Waddle, Texas Tech (Coaches-1; Media-1)
- Cornelius Lucas, Kansas State (Coaches-1; Media-2)
- Tanner Hawkinson, Kansas (Coaches-2; Media-2)
- Lane Johnson, Oklahoma (Coaches-2)

=== Tight ends ===
- Travis Tannahill, Kansas State (Coaches-1; Media-1)
- Jace Amaro, Texas Tech (Coaches-2)
- Trey Millard, Oklahoma (Media-2)

=== Receivers ===
- Stedman Bailey, West Virginia (Coaches-1; Media-1)
- Terrance Williams, Baylor (Coaches-1; Media-1)
- Tavon Austin, West Virginia (Coaches-1; Media-2)
- Josh Stewart, Oklahoma State (Media-1)
- Darrin Moore, Texas Tech (Coaches-2; Media-2)
- Kenny Stills, Oklahoma (Coaches-2; Media-2)
- Chris Harper, K-State (Coaches-2)
- Eric Ward, Texas Tech (Media-2)

== Defensive selections ==
=== Defensive linemen ===
- Devonte Fields, TCU (Coaches-1; Media-1)
- Alex Okafor, Texas (Coaches-1; Media-1)
- Meshak Williams, Kansas State (Coaches-1; Media-1)
- Calvin Barnett, Oklahoma State (Media-2; Coaches-1)
- Kerry Hyder, Texas Tech (Coaches-2; Media-1)
- Stansly Maponga, TCU (Coaches-1; Media-2)
- Adam Davis, Kansas State (Coaches-2; Media-2)
- Jake McDonough, Iowa State (Coaches-1)
- Dartwan Bush, Texas Tech (Media-2)
- Chucky Hunter, TCU (Coaches-2)
- David King, Oklahoma (Coaches-2)
- Vai Lutui, Kansas State (Coaches-2)

=== Linebackers ===
- Arthur Brown, Kansas State (Coaches-1; Media-1)
- A. J. Klein, Iowa State (Coaches-1; Media-1)
- Jake Knott, Iowa State (Coaches-1; Media-1)
- Kenny Cain, TCU (Coaches-2; Media-1)
- Bryce Hager, Baylor (Coaches-2; Media-2)
- Ben Heeney, Kansas (Coaches-2; Media-2)
- Eddie Lackey, Baylor (Media-2)
- Shaun Lewis, Oklahoma State (Media-2)

=== Defensive backs ===
- Aaron Colvin, Oklahoma (Coaches-1; Media-1)
- Tony Jefferson, Oklahoma (Coaches-1; Media-1)
- Jason Verrett, TCU (Coaches-1; Media-1)
- Ty Zimmerman, Kansas State (Coaches-1; Media-1)
- Kenny Vaccaro, Texas (Coaches-1; Media-2)
- Sam Carter, TCU (Coaches-2; Media-2)
- Durrell Givens, Iowa State (Coaches-2; Media-2)
- Nigel Malone, Kansas State (Media-2)
- Cody Davis, Texas Tech (Coaches-2)
- Bradley McDougald, Kansas (Coaches-2)
- D.J. Johnson, Texas Tech (Coaches-2)
- Demontre Hurst, Oklahoma (Coaches-2)

== Special teams ==
=== Kickers ===
- Quinn Sharp, Oklahoma State (Coaches-1; Media-1)
- Anthony Cantele, Kansas State (Coaches-2; Media-2)

=== Punters ===
- Quinn Sharp, Oklahoma State (Coaches-1; Media-1)
- Alex King, Texas (Media-2)
- Kirby Van Der Kamp, Iowa State (Coaches-2)

=== All-purpose / Return specialists ===
- Tavon Austin, West Virginia (Coaches-1; Media-1)
- Justin Gilbert, Oklahoma State (Coaches-2)
- Tyler Lockett, Kansas State (Media-2)

== Key ==
Bold = selected as a first-team player by both the coaches and media panel

Coaches = selected by Big 12 Conference coaches

Media = selected by a media panel

== See also ==
- 2012 College Football All-America Team
