= Damien Williams =

American football player (born 1992)

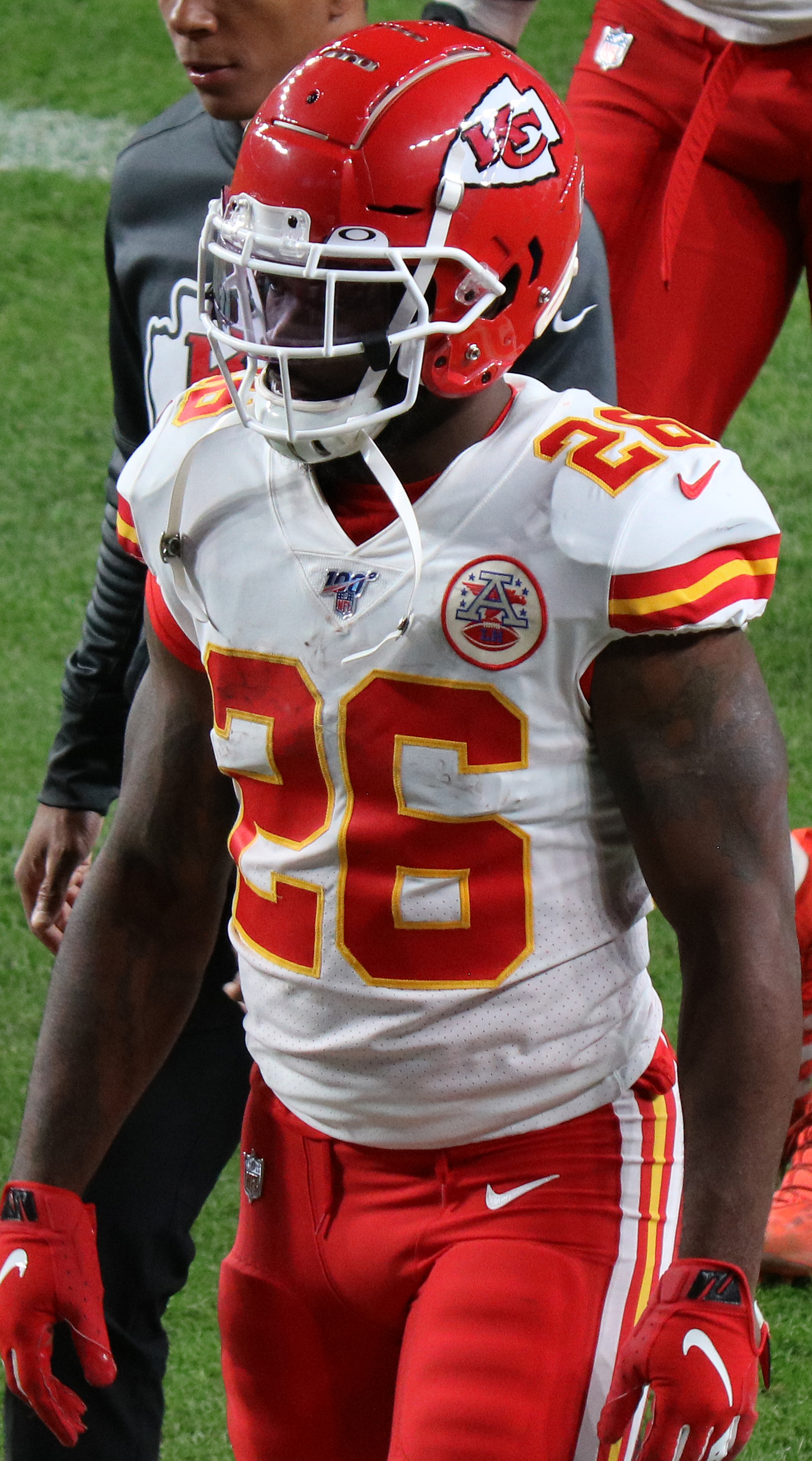
- Williams with the Kansas City Chiefs in 2019

No. 34, 26, 8, 6, 29
- Position: Running back

Personal information
- Born: April 3, 1992 (age 34); San Diego, California, U.S.
- Listed height: 5 ft 11 in (1.80 m)
- Listed weight: 221 lb (100 kg)

Career information
- High school: Mira Mesa (San Diego)
- College: Arizona Western (2010–2011); Oklahoma (2012–2013)
- NFL draft: 2014: undrafted

Career history
- Miami Dolphins (2014–2017); Kansas City Chiefs (2018–2020); Chicago Bears (2021); Atlanta Falcons (2022); Las Vegas Raiders (2023)*; Arizona Cardinals (2023)
- * Offseason or practice squad member only

Awards and highlights
- Super Bowl champion (LIV); Second-team All-Big 12 (2012)

Career NFL statistics
- Rushing yards: 1,440
- Rushing average: 4.1
- Receptions: 156
- Receiving yards: 1,221
- Receiving average: 7.8
- Return yards: 584
- Total touchdowns: 25
- Stats at Pro Football Reference

Damien Williams (born April 3, 1992) is an American former professional football player who was a running back in the National Football League (NFL) for 10 seasons. He played college football for the Oklahoma Sooners and was signed by the Miami Dolphins as an undrafted free agent in 2014. Williams was also a member of the Kansas City Chiefs, Chicago Bears, Atlanta Falcons, Las Vegas Raiders, and Arizona Cardinals. He won Super Bowl LIV with the Chiefs by scoring the game-clinching touchdown on a 38-yard run with less than two minutes left in the game.

== Early life ==
Williams was born in San Diego, California. He played varsity football at El Cajon Valley High School as a freshman. Over the next three years, Williams played high school football at Mira Mesa Senior High School.

== College career ==
Williams was originally expected to play college football for Arizona State but did not meet the ACT test score requirement. Therefore, he played at Arizona Western College before transferring to the University of Oklahoma in 2012.

In November 2013, Williams was dismissed from Oklahoma after violating team rules. In two seasons with the Sooners, he rushed for 1,499 yards with 18 touchdowns, including a 95-yard touchdown run against Texas in 2012.

== Professional career ==
Pre-draft measurables
Height	Weight	Arm length	Hand span	40-yard dash	10-yard split	20-yard split	20-yard shuttle	Three-cone drill	Vertical jump	Broad jump	Bench press
5 ft 11 1/4 in (1.81 m)	222 lb (101 kg)	30 5/8 in (0.78 m)	9 1/8 in (0.23 m)	4.45 s	1.56 s	2.61 s	4.25 s	7.37 s	35.5 in (0.90 m)	10 ft 1 in (3.07 m)	16 reps
All values from NFL Combine

=== Miami Dolphins ===
==== 2014 season ====
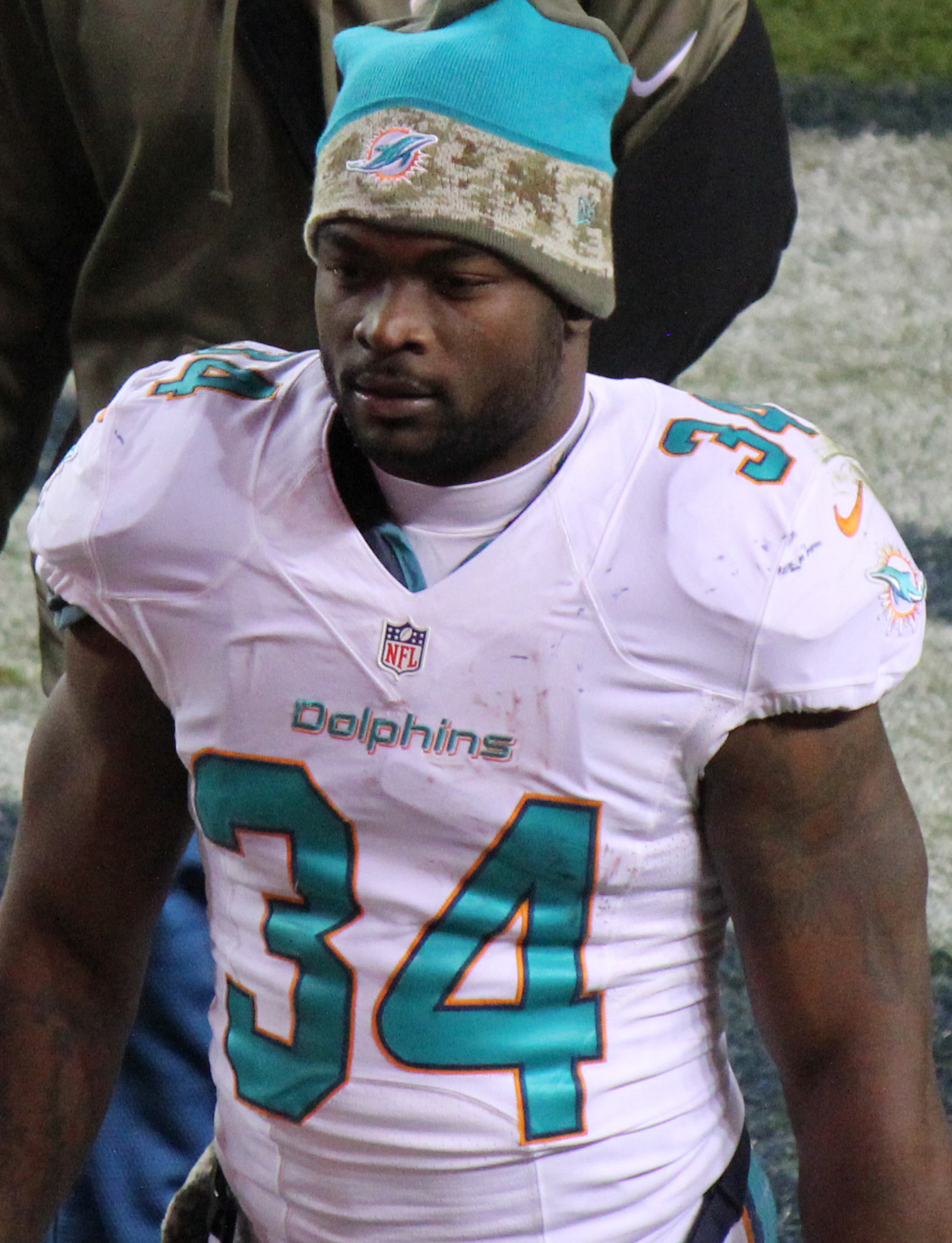
Williams in 2014

On May 11, 2014, Williams signed with the Miami Dolphins as an undrafted free agent.

Williams made his NFL debut in the season-opening 33–20 victory over the New England Patriots, returning one kick for 19 yards. In the next game against the Buffalo Bills, Williams had five carries for 19 yards during the 29–10 road loss. During Week 16 against the Minnesota Vikings, he had six receptions for 50 yards and his first NFL touchdown in the narrow 37–35 victory.

Williams finished his rookie year with 36 carries for 122 yards and 21 receptions for 187 yards and a touchdown in 16 games and no starts.

==== 2015 season ====
During a Week 2 23–20 loss to the Jacksonville Jaguars, Williams had three receptions for 15 yards and a touchdown. He finished his second professional season with 16 carries for 59 yards and 21 receptions for 142 yards and a touchdown in 16 games and no starts.

==== 2016 season ====
During a Week 3 30–24 overtime victory over the Cleveland Browns, Williams recorded three receptions for 10 yards and his first touchdown of the season to go along with a 15-yard carry. Three weeks later against the Pittsburgh Steelers, Williams had six carries for 12 yards and his first career rushing touchdown in the 30–15 victory. In the next game against the Bills, Williams recorded four carries for 16 yards and a touchdown during the 28–25 victory. During Week 10 against the San Diego Chargers, he rushed twice for two yards and a touchdown and caught an 18-yard touchdown in the 31–24 road victory.

Williams finished the 2016 season with 35 carries for 115 yards and three touchdowns to go along with 23 receptions for 249 yards and three touchdowns in 15 games and no stats. The Dolphins finished second in the AFC East with a 10–6 record and made the playoffs as the #6-seed. During the Wild Card Round against the Steelers, Williams had three carries for 14 yards and a four-yard touchdown reception in the 30–12 road loss.

==== 2017 season ====
Set to be a restricted free agent in 2017, the Dolphins tendered Williams at the lowest level. After reportedly wanting a larger contract than the $1.797 million tender for 2017, he officially signed the tender on May 11, 2017.

Williams entered the season second on the Dolphins' running back depth chart behind Jay Ajayi. However, Williams was named the starter ahead of Kenyan Drake after Ajayi was traded to the Philadelphia Eagles on October 31. Williams made his first career start in Week 9 against the Oakland Raiders on Sunday Night Football and finished the 27–24 loss with seven carries for 14 yards and six receptions for 47 yards and his only touchdown of the season. Two weeks later against the Tampa Bay Buccaneers, Williams set season-highs in carries with 10 and rushing yards with 78 while also recording a 24-yard reception in the 30–20 loss. In the next game against the Patriots, he had eight carries for 38 yards and three receptions for 14 yards before leaving the eventual 35–17 road loss during the third quarter with a shoulder injury. Williams was expected to be out for two to three weeks, but he ended up missing the rest of the season.

Williams finished the 2017 season with 46 carries for 181 yards and 20 receptions for 155 yards and a touchdown in 11 games and four starts.

=== Kansas City Chiefs ===
==== 2018 season ====
Williams signed with the Kansas City Chiefs on March 22, 2018.

Williams' role increased after starter Kareem Hunt was released on November 30. During Week 14 against the Baltimore Ravens, Williams made his first start of the season and finished the 27–24 overtime victory with eight carries for 14 yards and a touchdown to go along with four receptions for 16 yards and a touchdown. In the next game against the Los Angeles Chargers on Thursday Night Football, Williams had 10 carries for 49 yards and two touchdowns to go along with six receptions for 74 yards during the narrow 29–28 loss. The following week against the Seattle Seahawks, he had his first game with over 100 rushing yards, recording 13 carries for 103 yards and seven receptions for 37 yards and a touchdown in the 38–31 road loss.

On December 27, the Chiefs signed Williams to a two-year, $8.1 million contract extension. Three days later in the regular season finale against the Raiders, he had 11 carries for 51 yards and a touchdown to go along with an eight-yard reception during the 35–3 blowout victory.

Williams finished the 2018 season with 50 carries for 256 yards and four touchdowns to go along with 23 receptions for 160 yards and two touchdowns in 16 games and three starts. He was called upon in the playoffs as the Chiefs' feature back. In the Divisional Round against the Indianapolis Colts, Williams had 25 carries for 129 yards and a touchdown to go along with five receptions for 25 yards during the 31–13 victory. During the AFC Championship Game against the Patriots, he rushed 10 times for 30 yards and a touchdown and caught five passes for 66 yards and two touchdowns in the 37–31 overtime loss.

==== 2019 season ====
During the season-opener against the Jaguars, Williams had 13 carries for 26 yards and a touchdown to go along with six receptions for 39 yards in the 40–26 road victory. In the next game against the Raiders, he caught three passes for 48 yards before leaving the eventual 28–10 road victory during the fourth quarter with a knee contusion. Williams missed the next two games as a result.

During a Week 6 31–24 loss to the Houston Texans, Williams had a six-yard carry and a 14-yard touchdown reception. Two weeks later against the Green Bay Packers on Sunday Night Football, he rushed seven times for 30 yards and a touchdown in the 31–24 loss. In the next game against the Vikings, Williams had his first 100-yard game of the season, rushing 12 times for 125 yards and a 91-yard touchdown during the 26–23 victory. The 91-yard run tied Jamaal Charles for the longest touchdown run in franchise history.

During Week 10 against the Tennessee Titans, Williams rushed 19 times for 77 yards in the 35–32 road loss. In the next game against the Chargers on Monday Night Football, he had four carries for seven yards and a six-yard reception before leaving the eventual 24–17 road victory with a rib injury during the second quarter. Williams returned from injury in Week 16 against the Chicago Bears on Sunday Night Football and finished the 26–3 road victory with 16 carries for 65 yards to go along with three receptions for 27 yards and a touchdown. During the regular season finale against the Chargers, he recorded 12 carries for 124 yards and two touchdowns, including an 84-yard touchdown, and also caught four passes for 30 yards in the 31–21 victory.

Williams finished the 2019 season with 111 carries for 498 yards and five touchdowns to go along with 30 receptions for 213 yards and two touchdowns in 11 games and six starts. In the Divisional Round against the Texans, he had 12 carries for 47 yards and two touchdowns to go along with two receptions for 21 yards and a touchdown during the 51–31 comeback victory. During the AFC Championship Game against the Titans, Williams recorded 17 carries for 45 yards and a touchdown to go along with five receptions for 44 yards in the 35–24 victory. In Super Bowl LIV against the San Francisco 49ers, he had 17 carries for 104 yards and a 38-yard touchdown to go along with four receptions for 29 yards and a touchdown during the 31–20 victory. Williams scored a receiving touchdown with 2:44 left in the game that gave the Chiefs the lead. On their next possession, he scored the game clinching rushing touchdown that gave the Chiefs a 10-point lead with 1:12 left in the game. Williams is the first player in Super Bowl history with at least 100 rushing yards while recording a rushing and receiving touchdown.

==== 2020 season ====
On July 29, 2020, the Chiefs announced that Williams would opt out of the season due to the COVID-19 pandemic. The following day, he announced on SiriusXM NFL radio that the reason why he opted out was because his mother had recently been diagnosed with stage IV cancer. Without Williams, the Chiefs reached Super Bowl LV, where they lost 31–9 to the Tampa Bay Buccaneers.

Williams was released on March 16, 2021.

=== Chicago Bears ===
On March 26, 2021, Williams signed a one-year contract with the Chicago Bears.

Williams made his Bears debut in the season-opener against the Los Angeles Rams and finished the 34–14 road loss with six carries for 12 yards and four receptions for 28 yards. Three weeks later against the Detroit Lions, he had eight carries for 55 yards and his first touchdown of the season to go along with two receptions for 15 yards in the 24–14 victory. In the next game against the Las Vegas Raiders, Williams recorded 16 carries for 64 yards and a touchdown to go along with two receptions for 20 yards during the 20–9 road victory. During the regular season finale against the Vikings, he caught three passes for 33 yards and a touchdown in the 31–17 road loss.

Williams finished the 2021 season with 40 carries for 164 yards and two touchdowns to go along with 16 receptions for 103 yards and a touchdown in 12 games and two starts.

=== Atlanta Falcons ===
On March 17, 2022, Williams signed a one-year contract with the Atlanta Falcons.

Williams made his Falcons debut in the season-opener against the New Orleans Saints, rushing twice for two yards before leaving the narrow 27–26 loss during the first quarter with a rib injury. He was placed on injured reserve on September 17.

Williams was released on December 12.

=== Las Vegas Raiders ===
On August 11, 2023, Williams signed with the Las Vegas Raiders. He was released on August 29.

=== Arizona Cardinals ===
On October 5, 2023, the Arizona Cardinals signed Williams to their practice squad. Nine days later, he was elevated to the active roster for the Week 6 matchup against the Rams. Williams finished the 26–9 road loss with eight carries for 36 yards and an eight-yard reception. On October 16, he was reverted to the practice squad.

Williams was released on November 9.

== Career statistics ==
=== NFL ===
Legend
	Won the Super Bowl
	Led the league
**Bold**	Career high

==== Regular season ====
Year	Team	Games		Rushing					Receiving					Returning					Fumbles	
Year	Team	GP	GS	Att	Yds	Avg	Lng	TD	Rec	Yds	Avg	Lng	TD	Ret	Yds	Avg	Lng	TD	Fum	Lost
2014	MIA	16	0	36	122	3.4	19	0	21	187	8.9	32	1	5	102	20.4	26	0	0	0
2015	MIA	16	0	16	59	3.7	19	0	21	142	6.8	23	1	**21**	**457**	**21.8**	**37**	0	**2**	**1**
2016	MIA	15	0	35	115	3.3	23	3	23	**249**	**10.8**	**58**	**3**	3	32	10.7	17	0	1	**1**
2017	MIA	11	4	46	181	3.9	69	0	20	155	7.8	24	1	1	−7	−7.0	−7	0	0	0
2018	KC	16	3	50	256	**5.1**	25	4	23	160	7.0	32	2	0	0	0.0	0	0	1	**1**
2019	KC	11	6	**111**	**498**	4.5	**91T**	**5**	**30**	213	7.1	32	2	0	0	0.0	0	0	1	**1**
2020	KC	0	0	Opt-out due to COVID-19 pandemic																
2021	CHI	12	2	40	164	4.1	23	2	16	103	6.4	23T	1	0	0	0.0	0	0	0	0
2022	ATL	1	1	2	2	1.0	2	0	0	0	0.0	0	0	0	0	0	0	0	0	0
2023	ARI	3	0	11	43	3.9	9	0	2	12	6.0	8	0	0	0	0	0	0	0	0
Career		101	16	347	1,440	4.1	91T	14	156	1,221	7.8	58	11	30	584	19.5	37	0	5	4

==== Postseason ====
Year	Team	Games		Rushing					Receiving					Returning					Fumbles	
Year	Team	GP	GS	Att	Yds	Avg	Lng	TD	Rec	Yds	Avg	Lng	TD	Ret	Yds	Avg	Lng	TD	Fum	Lost
2016	MIA	1	0	3	14	**4.7**	15	0	1	4	4.0	4T	1	0	0	0.0	0	0	0	0
2018	KC	2	2	35	159	4.5	24	2	10	91	**9.1**	**33**	**2**	0	0	0.0	0	0	0	0
2019	KC	3	3	**46**	**196**	4.3	**38T**	**4**	**11**	**94**	8.5	17	**2**	0	0	0.0	0	0	**1**	0
2020	KC	0	0	Opt-out due to COVID-19 pandemic																
Career		6	5	84	369	4.4	38T	6	22	189	8.6	33	5	0	0	0.0	0	0	1	0

=== College ===
Season	Team	Pos	GP	Rushing				Receiving			
Season	Team	Pos	GP	Att	Yds	Avg	TD	Rec	Yds	Avg	TD
2012	Oklahoma	RB	13	176	946	5.4	11	34	320	9.4	1
2013	Oklahoma	RB	9	114	553	4.9	7	9	90	10.0	0
Career			22	290	1,499	5.2	18	43	410	9.5	1
