= Bryce Hager =

American football player (born 1992)

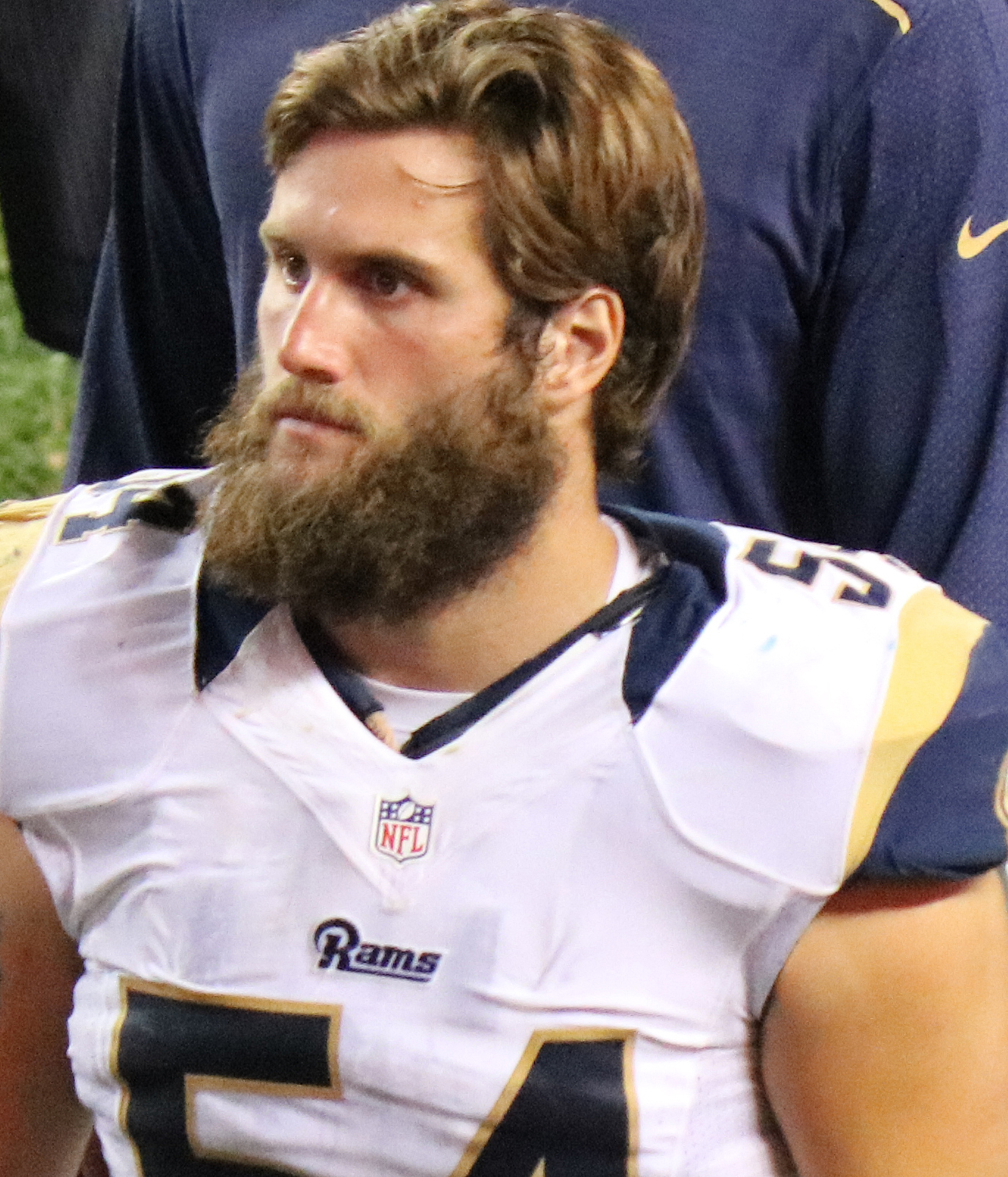
- Hager with the Los Angeles Rams in 2016

No. 54, 58
- Position: Linebacker

Personal information
- Born: May 4, 1992 (age 34); Austin, Texas, U.S.
- Listed height: 6 ft 1 in (1.85 m)
- Listed weight: 237 lb (108 kg)

Career information
- High school: Westlake (Austin)
- College: Baylor (2010–2014)
- NFL draft: 2015: 7th round, 224th overall pick

Career history
- St. Louis / Los Angeles Rams (2015–2019); Las Vegas Raiders (2020)*; New York Jets (2020)
- * Offseason or practice squad member only

Awards and highlights
- 3× Second-team All-Big 12 (2012, 2013, 2014)

Career NFL statistics
- Total tackles: 71
- Sacks: 0.5
- Forced fumbles: 1
- Fumble recoveries: 1
- Pass deflections: 4
- Stats at Pro Football Reference

Bryce Gunnar Hager (born May 4, 1992) is an American former professional football player who played as a linebacker in the National Football League (NFL). He played college football for the Baylor Bears. He was selected by the St. Louis Rams in the seventh round of the 2015 NFL draft.

== Early life ==
Hager attended Westlake High School, where he played high school football alongside future NFL quarterback Nick Foles and kicker Justin Tucker.

== College career ==
Hager played college football for the Baylor Bears.

=== Statistics ===
Year	School	Conf	Class	Pos	G	Tackles					Interceptions					Fumbles			
Year	School	Conf	Class	Pos	G	Solo	Ast	Tot	Loss	Sk	Int	Yds	Avg	TD	PD	FR	Yds	TD	FF
2011	Baylor	Big 12	FR	LB	13	8	5	13	0.0	0.0	0	0	0.0	0	0	0	0	0	1
2012	Baylor	Big 12	SO	LB	12	72	52	124	9.5	4.0	0	0	0.0	0	1	0	0	0	2
2013	Baylor	Big 12	JR	LB	9	46	25	71	2.5	1.0	0	0	0.0	0	3	1	91	1	0
2014	Baylor	Big 12	SR	LB	13	76	38	114	12.0	2.0	1	36	36.0	0	1	0	0	0	2
Career					47	202	120	322	24.0	7.0	1	36	36.0	0	5	1	91	1	5

== Professional career ==
Pre-draft measurables
Height	Weight	Arm length	Hand span	40-yard dash	20-yard shuttle	Three-cone drill	Vertical jump	Broad jump	Bench press
6 ft 0 3/4 in (1.85 m)	234 lb (106 kg)	31 3/8 in (0.80 m)	9 in (0.23 m)	4.60 s	4.36 s	7.15 s	35.0 in (0.89 m)	9 ft 9 in (2.97 m)	26 reps
All values from NFL Combine

=== St. Louis / Los Angeles Rams ===
Hager was selected by the St. Louis Rams in the seventh round, 224th overall, of the 2015 NFL draft. The 224 overall pick was traded to the Rams by the New York Jets in exchange for Zac Stacy.

On May 6, 2019, Hager re-signed with the Rams. He was placed on injured reserve on November 12, 2019, with a shoulder injury.

=== Las Vegas Raiders ===
On August 7, 2020, Hager signed with the Las Vegas Raiders. He was released on August 23, 2020.

=== New York Jets ===
On September 22, 2020, Hager was signed to the practice squad of the New York Jets. He was elevated to the active roster on October 24 and October 31 for the team's weeks 7 and 8 games against the Buffalo Bills and Kansas City Chiefs, and reverted to the practice squad after each game. He was promoted to the active roster on November 3, 2020.

== Personal life ==
Hager has a younger brother named Breckyn who played linebacker for the Texas Longhorns. Hager's father, Britt Hager, played nine years in the NFL with the Philadelphia Eagles, Denver Broncos, and St. Louis Rams.
