= Cornelius Lucas =

American football player (born 1991)

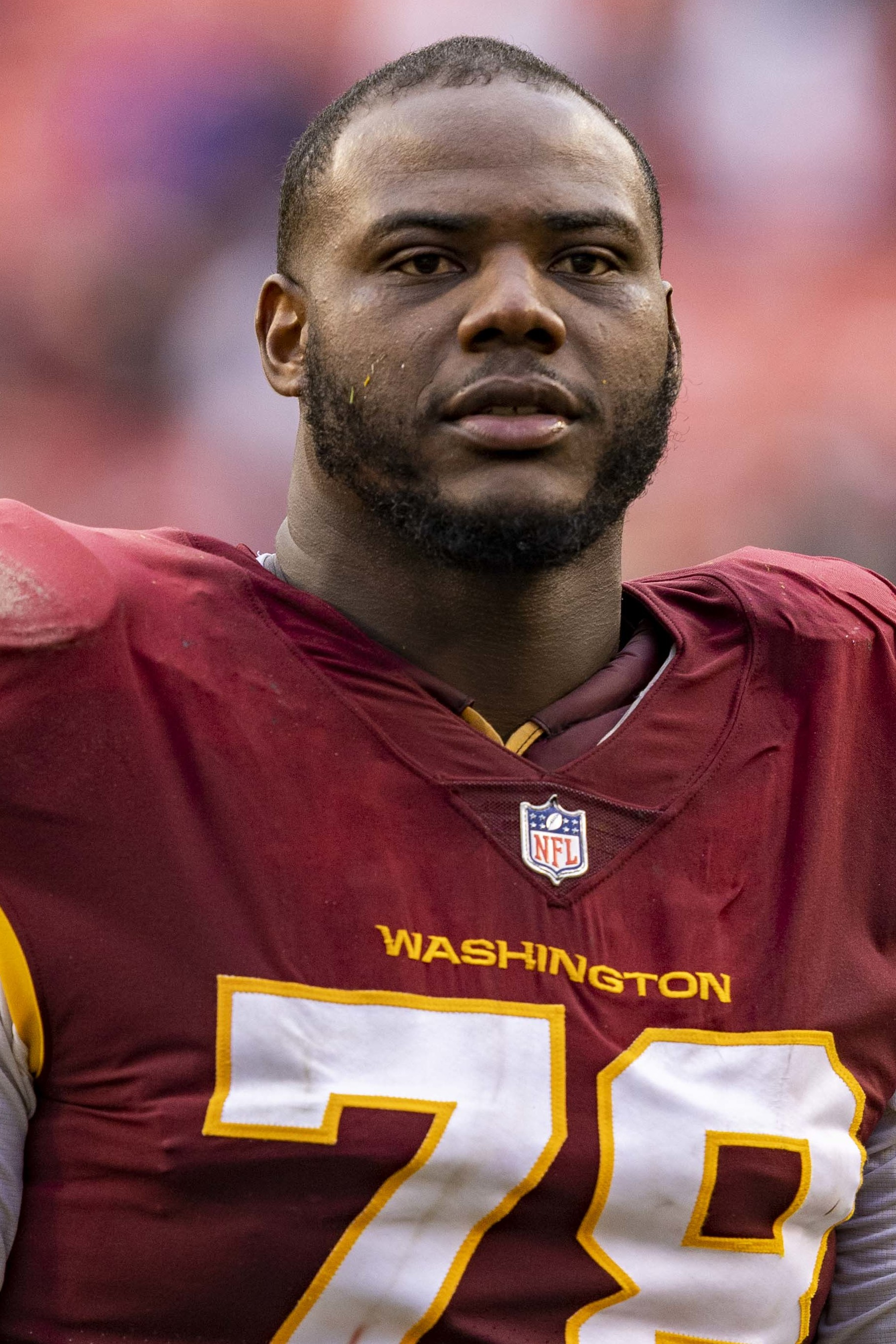
- Lucas with the Washington Football Team in 2021

Profile
- Position: Offensive tackle

Personal information
- Born: July 18, 1991 (age 35); New Orleans, Louisiana, U.S.
- Listed height: 6 ft 8 in (2.03 m)
- Listed weight: 327 lb (148 kg)

Career information
- High school: Edna Karr (New Orleans)
- College: Kansas State (2009–2013)
- NFL draft: 2014: undrafted

Career history
- Detroit Lions (2014–2016); Los Angeles Rams (2017); New Orleans Saints (2018); Chicago Bears (2019); Washington Football Team / Commanders (2020–2024); Cleveland Browns (2025)

Awards and highlights
- First-team All-Big 12 (2012); Second-team All-Big 12 (2013)

Career NFL statistics as of 2024
- Games played: 129
- Games started: 54
- Stats at Pro Football Reference

Cornelius Lucas III (born July 18, 1991) is an American professional football offensive tackle. He played college football for the Kansas State Wildcats and signed with the Detroit Lions as an undrafted free agent in 2014. Lucas has also been a member of the Los Angeles Rams, New Orleans Saints, Chicago Bears, Washington Commanders, and Cleveland Browns.

== College career ==
Cornelius played college football for the Kansas State Wildcats at left tackle.

== Professional career ==
Pre-draft measurables
Height	Weight	Arm length	Hand span
6 ft 8 3/8 in (2.04 m)	316 lb (143 kg)	36 3/4 in (0.93 m)	10 in (0.25 m)
All values from NFL draft

=== Detroit Lions ===
Lucas was signed by the Detroit Lions as an undrafted free agent on May 12, 2014. He played in 35 games and started six for the Lions from 2014 to 2016. As an exclusive-rights free agent, he was tendered by the Lions on March 9, 2017. On September 3, 2017, Lucas was waived by the Lions.

=== Los Angeles Rams ===
On September 12, 2017, Lucas was signed by the Los Angeles Rams. He made his first and only start of the season in the Week 17 matchup against the 49ers at right tackle.

On April 16, 2018, Lucas re-signed with the Rams. He was released on August 31, 2018.

=== New Orleans Saints ===
On December 20, 2018, Lucas was signed by the New Orleans Saints, but was released two days later. He was re-signed on December 27, but was released four days later.

=== Chicago Bears ===
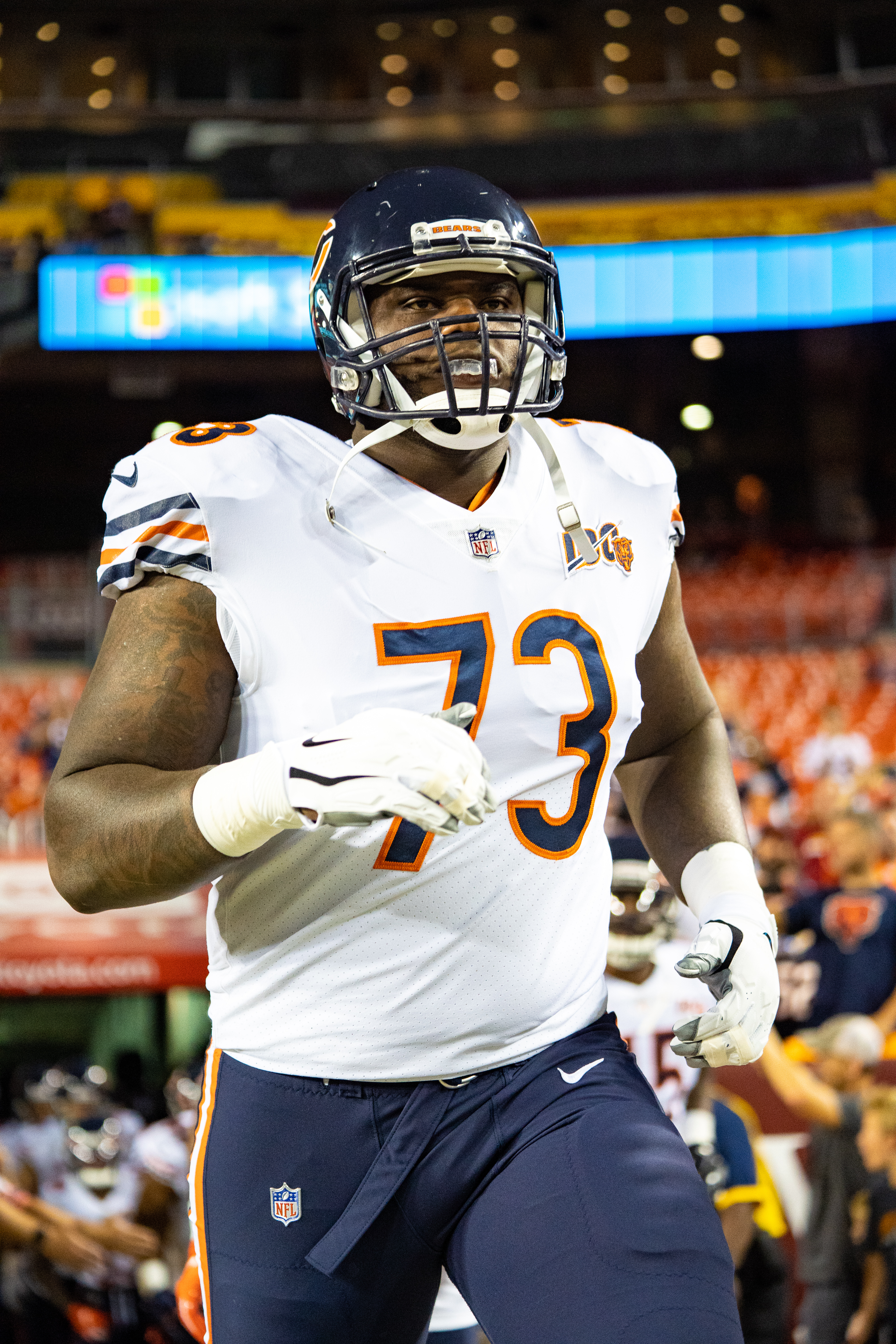
Lucas with the Chicago Bears in 2019

On January 23, 2019, Lucas signed a reserve/future contract with the Chicago Bears. In Week 3 of the 2019 season, he started at right tackle in place of an ailing Bobby Massie; the Bears went on to win 31–15. During the year, he also saw action on tackle-eligible plays as an extra blocker.

=== Washington Football Team / Commanders ===
On March 27, 2020, Lucas signed with the Washington Football Team. Lucas started at left tackle in place of an injured Geron Christian in the Week 7 win against the Dallas Cowboys. He started the next two games, but was forced to leave in the second half of the Week 10 game against the Lions due to an injury. He missed the next two games, returning in Week 13 and started at left tackle for the rest of the season.

On December 15, 2021, Lucas was placed on the COVID-19 reserve list. After missing the Week 15 game against the Philadelphia Eagles, he was placed back on the active roster on December 22.

Lucas re-signed with the team on a two-year contract on March 24, 2022. He was placed on the active/non-football injury list at the start of training camp in 2022; he was activated on August 15. In Week 5 of the 2022 season, Lucas was named as the starting right tackle in place of Sam Cosmi, who had thumb surgery, and continued to start even when Cosmi began playing again three weeks later.

On March 19, 2024, Lucas re-signed with the Commanders to a one-year, $4 million contract.

=== Cleveland Browns ===
On March 12, 2025, Lucas signed a two-year, $10 million contract with the Cleveland Browns. On March 3, 2026, he was released.
