= Corey Nelson =

American football player (born 1992)

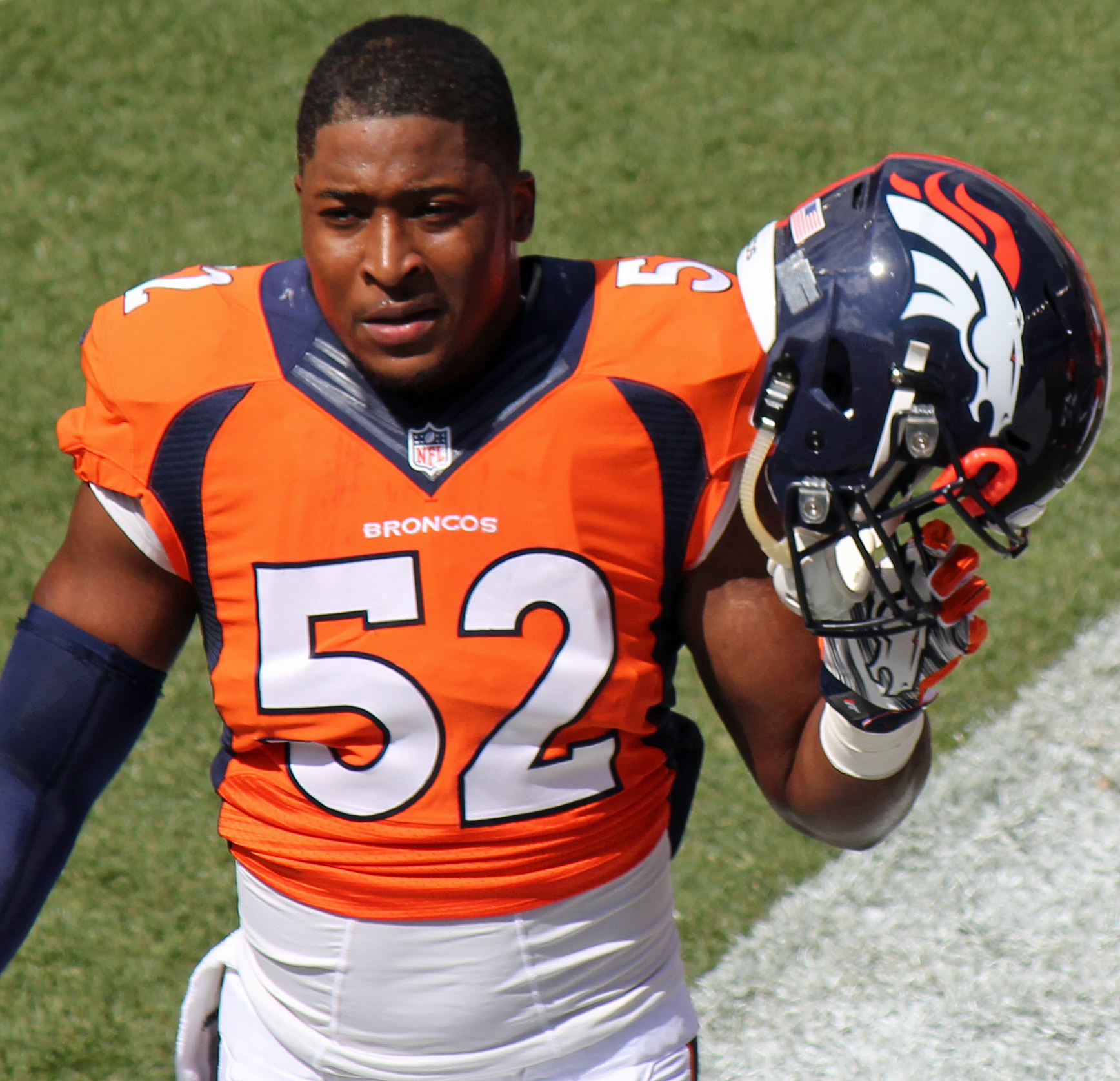
- Nelson with the Denver Broncos in 2014

No. 52, 55, 56
- Position: Linebacker

Personal information
- Born: April 22, 1992 (age 34); Dallas, Texas, U.S.
- Listed height: 6 ft 1 in (1.85 m)
- Listed weight: 226 lb (103 kg)

Career information
- High school: Skyline (Dallas, Texas)
- College: Oklahoma
- NFL draft: 2014: 7th round, 242nd overall pick

Career history
- Denver Broncos (2014–2017); Philadelphia Eagles (2018)*; Atlanta Falcons (2018); Tampa Bay Buccaneers (2019)*; Denver Broncos (2019)
- * Offseason or practice squad member only

Awards and highlights
- Super Bowl champion (50)

Career NFL statistics
- Total tackles: 116
- Sacks: 1.0
- Fumble recoveries: 1
- Stats at Pro Football Reference

Corey Nelson (born April 22, 1992) is an American former professional football player who was a linebacker in the National Football League (NFL). He was selected by the Denver Broncos in the seventh round of the 2014 NFL draft. He played college football at Oklahoma.

== Professional career ==
=== Denver Broncos (first stint) ===
Nelson was selected by the Denver Broncos in the seventh round, 242nd overall, in the 2014 NFL draft. He played all 16 regular-season games his rookie year and totaled 13 tackles, one pass defensed, and four special-teams stops.

In the 2015 season, Nelson played all 16 regular-season games and totaled 10 tackles, one sack, and seven special-teams stops. On February 7, 2016, he was part of the Broncos team that won Super Bowl 50. In the game, he recorded one tackle as the Broncos defeated the Carolina Panthers by a score of 24–10.

In the 2016 season, Nelson played in all 16 games with five starts recording a career-high 67 tackles and five passes defensed.

On October 21, 2017, Nelson was placed on injured reserve after having surgery on a torn bicep.

=== Philadelphia Eagles ===
On March 14, 2018, Nelson signed a one-year deal with the Philadelphia Eagles. He was released on August 26, 2018.

=== Atlanta Falcons ===
On September 10, 2018, Nelson was signed by the Atlanta Falcons. He was released on September 22, 2018.

=== Tampa Bay Buccaneers ===
On January 3, 2019, Nelson signed a reserve/future contract with the Tampa Bay Buccaneers. He was released during final roster cuts on August 30, 2019.

=== Denver Broncos (second stint) ===
On September 2, 2019, Nelson was re-signed by the Broncos. In Week 8, Nelson suffered a torn biceps and was ruled out for the remainder of the season.

=== Carolina Panthers ===
After becoming a free agent in March 2020, Nelson had a tryout with the Carolina Panthers on August 19, 2020.
