= Aaron Colvin =

American football player (born 1991)

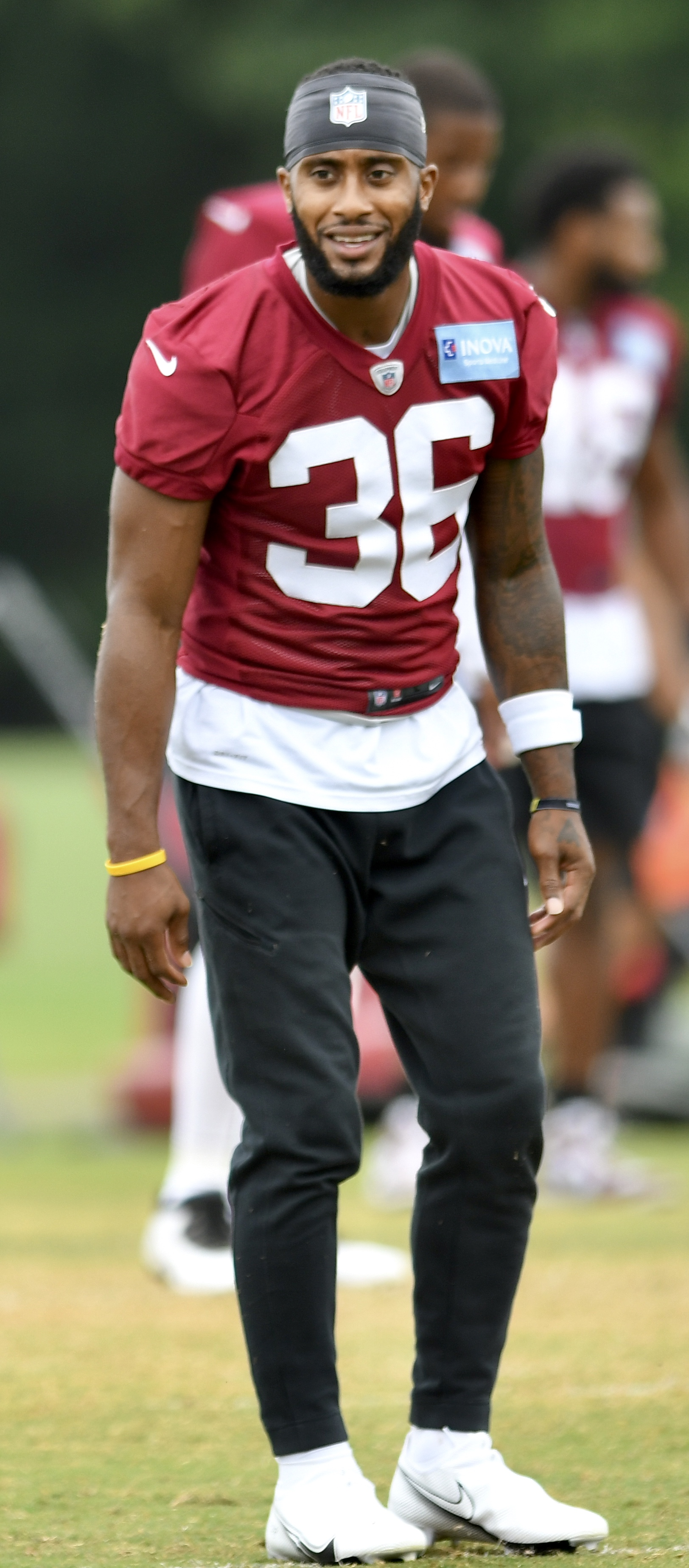
- Colvin with the Washington Football Team in 2020

No. 22, 47
- Position: Cornerback

Personal information
- Born: October 2, 1991 (age 35); Old Hickory, Tennessee, U.S.
- Listed height: 6 ft 0 in (1.83 m)
- Listed weight: 191 lb (87 kg)

Career information
- High school: Owasso (Owasso, Oklahoma)
- College: Oklahoma (2010-2013)
- NFL draft: 2014: 4th round, 114th overall pick

Career history
- Jacksonville Jaguars (2014–2017); Houston Texans (2018–2019); Washington Redskins / Football Team (2019–2020)

Awards and highlights
- 2× First-team All-Big 12 (2012, 2013)

Career NFL statistics
- Total tackles: 211
- Sacks: 5.0
- Forced fumbles: 1
- Fumble recoveries: 4
- Pass deflections: 16
- Defensive touchdowns: 1
- Stats at Pro Football Reference

Aaron Colvin (born October 2, 1991) is an American former professional football player who was a cornerback in the National Football League (NFL). He played college football for the Oklahoma Sooners and was selected by the Jacksonville Jaguars in the fourth round of the 2014 NFL draft. He also played for the Houston Texans and Washington Redskins.

== Early life ==
Colvin attended Owasso High School in Owasso, Oklahoma, where he played high school football. He recorded 72 tackles, two interceptions while breaking up 10 passes and scoring five touchdowns in 2009. He was recognized as first-team All-State by both the Tulsa World and The Oklahoman in 2009, and was also the district 6A-4 defensive player of the year.

Considered a three-star recruit by Rivals.com, he was rated as the 31st best cornerback prospect in the nation. He committed to Oklahoma over offers from Oklahoma State, Missouri and Tulsa.

== College career ==
As a freshman, Colvin played in all 14 games, primarily on special teams and as a backup cornerback. He amassed 21 tackles, three for loss, three pass breakups and one forced fumble. In 2011, he was moved to strong safety and led the team with 84 tackles, including 4.5 for loss, and six pass breakups. As a junior in 2012, Colvin was moved back to cornerback. He started all 13 games, and finished tied for second in the Big 12 Conference with four interceptions. He also recorded 61 tackles, including 2.5 for loss, and eleven pass breakups while earning first-team All-Big 12 honors. In 2013, he played in 11 games, recording 55 tackles, including five for loss, one interception and three pass breakups. He ended his career earning a first-team All-Big 12 selection. Overall, Colvin finished his Oklahoma career playing in 50 games with 36 starts, recording 234 tackles, 3.5 sacks, 5 interceptions, 23 pass deflections, 3 fumble recoveries and 1 forced fumble.

== Professional career ==
=== Pre-draft ===
Pre-draft measurables
Height	Weight	Arm length	Hand span	Wingspan
5 ft 11 3/8 in (1.81 m)	177 lb (80 kg)	31 in (0.79 m)	9 1/4 in (0.23 m)	6 ft 4 in (1.93 m)
All values from NFL Combine

On December 16, 2013, it was announced that Colvin had accepted his invitation to play in the 2014 Senior Bowl. On January 21, 2014, it was reported that Colvin had torn his ACL in his right knee during a Senior Bowl practice. At the time of his injury he was rated as the fourth best cornerback prospect in the upcoming draft by ESPN analyst Mel Kiper Jr. and was projected to be selected in the first three rounds. At the conclusion of the pre-draft process, Colvin was projected to be a late round pick.

=== Jacksonville Jaguars ===
==== 2014 ====
The Jacksonville Jaguars selected Colvin in the fourth round (114th overall) of the 2014 NFL draft. Colvin was the 12th cornerback drafted in 2014. The pick that was used to select Colvin was acquired in a trade that sent Eugene Monroe to the Baltimore Ravens. On May 21, 2014, the Jaguars signed Colvin to a four-year, $2.67 million contract that includes a signing bonus of $453,152.

His knee injury sidelined him for the Jaguars’ entire training camp, preseason, and their first ten regular seasons games. On November 12, 2014, the Jaguars officially activated Colvin off of their physically unable to perform list. Upon joining the active roster, Colvin was named the third cornerback on the depth chart by head coach Gus Bradley. He began the season behind starting cornerbacks Dwayne Gratz and Demetrius McCray.

On November 23, 2014, Colvin made his professional regular season debut and recorded one tackle during the Jaguars’ 23–3 loss at the Indianapolis Colts in Week 12. On November 30, 2014, Colvin recorded four combined tackles, broke up a pass, and returned a fumble for a 41-yard touchdown during a 25–24 win against the New York Giants. Colvin recovered a fumble after the ball was fumbled by Giants’ tight end Larry Donnell after it was jarred loose by Gratz during the fourth quarter. The Jaguars went on to complete a 21-point comeback, the largest in team history, and earn their second win of the season. In Week 16, he collected a season-high seven solo tackles and deflected a pass during a 23–13 victory against the Tennessee Titans. On December 28, 2014, Colvin earned his first career start and recorded four combined tackles during a 23–17 loss at the Houston Texans in Week 17. He finished his rookie season in 2014 with 27 combined tackles (23 solo), two pass deflections, one fumble recovery, and one touchdown in six games and one start.

==== 2015 ====
Throughout training camp, Colvin competed to be a starting cornerback against Gratz and McCray. Bradley named Colvin and Davon House the starting cornerbacks to start the regular season in 2015. On October 4, 2015, Colvin recorded six combined tackles and made his first career sack on Colts’ quarterback Andrew Luck during a 16–13 loss at the Colts in Week 4. In Week 16, he collected a season-high nine combined tackles as the Jaguars lost 38–17 at the New Orleans Saints. Colvin finished the 2017 NFL season with a career-high 73 combined tackles (60 solo), seven pass deflections, four sacks, and one forced fumble in 16 games and 15 starts.

==== 2016 ====
On April 8, 2016, it was announced that Colvin had violated the NFL’s performance-enhancing substances policy and would be suspended for the first four games of the 2016 NFL season. Colvin entered training camp as a backup cornerback after the Jaguars signed free agent cornerback Prince Amukamara and drafted cornerback Jalen Ramsey in the first round (fifth overall) during the 2016 NFL draft. Upon his return from suspension, Colvin was named the fourth cornerback on the Jaguars’ depth chart. He began Week 6 listed behind Davon House, Jalen Ramsey, and Prince Amukamara. In Week 9, Colvin collected a season-high seven combined tackles during a 19–14 loss at the Kansas City Chiefs. On December 18, 2016, the Jaguars fired Bradley after they fell to a 2–12 record. Assistant head coach Doug Marrone was named the interim head coach for the remainder of the season. On December 23, 2016, the Jaguars placed Colvin on injured reserve due to an ankle injury. Colvin finished the 2016 season with 22 combined tackles (18 solo) and one pass deflection in ten games and four starts.

==== 2017 ====
Colvin entered training camp slated as the third cornerback on the depth chart. Head coach Doug Marrone retained Todd Wash as the defensive coordinator and named Colvin the third cornerback on the depth chart to start the season, behind Jalen Ramsey and A. J. Bouye. In Week 5, Colvin collected a season-high ten combined tackles (nine solo) during a 30–9 win at the Pittsburgh Steelers. He played in all 16 games with five starts, recording 45 combined tackles (28 solo) and five passes defensed. Colvin was one of two cornerbacks not to allow any touchdowns during the season. He played 672 defensive snaps and received an overall grade of 80.0 from Pro Football Focus.

The Jaguars finished first in the AFC South with a 10–6 record and earned a playoff berth. On January 7, 2018, Colvin appeared in his first career playoff game and recorded one solo tackle, deflected a pass, and made his first career interception as the Jaguars defeated the Buffalo Bills 10–3 in the AFC Wildcard Game. Colvin intercepted a pass by Bills’ quarterback Tyrod Taylor, that was originally intended for tight end Logan Thomas and was deflected by Jaguars’ linebacker Myles Jack during the second quarter. The following week, the Jaguars defeated the Steelers 45–42 in the AFC Divisional Round before being eliminated from the playoffs after a 24–20 loss at the New England Patriots in the AFC Championship Game.

=== Houston Texans ===
On March 13, 2018, the Texans signed Colvin to a four-year, $34 million contract that includes $18 million guaranteed and a signing bonus of $4 million. He entered training camp slated as the first-team nickelback and third cornerback on the depth chart. Head coach Bill O’Brien named Colvin the third cornerback on the depth chart to begin the regular season, behind Johnathan Joseph and Kevin Johnson. On September 11, 2018, Colvin became a starting cornerback after Kevin Johnson was placed on injured reserve. He was inactive for three games (Weeks 5-7) due to an ankle injury.

On September 10, 2019, Colvin was released by the Texans after giving up a catch on Monday Night Football lto Ted Ginn Jr. to put the Saints in field goal range that possibly helped cost the Texans the game with Wil Lutz nailing a 58-yard field goal and Colvin's team losing 30–28.

=== Washington Redskins / Football Team ===
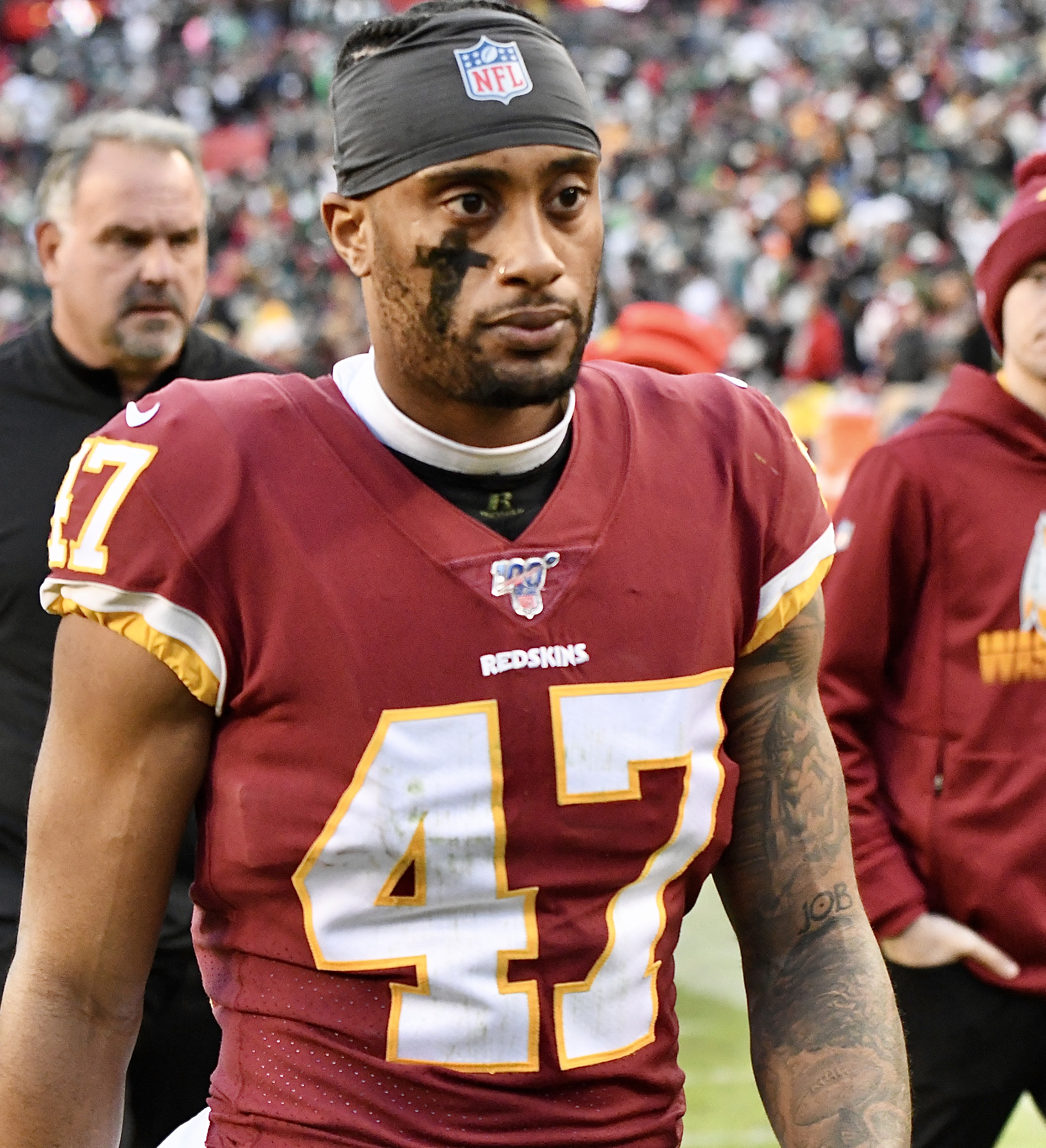
Colvin with the Washington Redskins in 2019

On September 13, 2019, Colvin signed a one-year contract with the Washington Redskins. Colvin re-signed on May 14, 2020. He was released during final roster cuts on September 5, 2020, and signed to the practice squad the next day. His practice squad contract with the team expired after the season on January 18, 2021.

== NFL career statistics ==
Legend
	Led the league
**Bold**	Career high

=== Regular season ===
Year	Team	Games		Tackles					Interceptions					Fumbles			
Year	Team	GP	GS	Cmb	Solo	Ast	Sck	TFL	Int	Yds	TD	Lng	PD	FF	FR	Yds	TD
2014	JAX	6	1	27	23	4	0.0	0	0	0	0	0	2	0	1	**41**	**1**
2015	JAX	**16**	**15**	**73**	**60**	**13**	**4.0**	**6**	0	0	0	0	**7**	**1**	0	0	0
2016	JAX	10	4	22	18	4	1.0	2	0	0	0	0	0	0	0	0	0
2017	JAX	**16**	5	45	38	7	0.0	4	0	0	0	0	5	0	1	0	0
2018	HOU	10	2	29	22	7	0.0	0	0	0	0	0	1	0	**2**	0	0
2019	HOU	1	1	5	4	1	0.0	0	0	0	0	0	0	0	0	0	0
2019	WAS	6	2	10	9	1	0.0	0	0	0	0	0	1	0	0	0	0
		65	30	211	174	37	5.0	12	0	0	0	0	16	1	4	41	1

=== Playoffs ===
Year	Team	Games		Tackles					Interceptions					Fumbles			
Year	Team	GP	GS	Cmb	Solo	Ast	Sck	TFL	Int	Yds	TD	Lng	PD	FF	FR	Yds	TD
2017	JAX	**3**	0	**3**	**2**	**1**	0.0	0	**1**	0	0	0	**1**	0	0	0	0
		3	0	3	2	1	0.0	0	1	0	0	0	1	0	0	0	0
