= Trey Millard =

American football player (born 1991)

No. 33
- Position: Fullback

Personal information
- Born: July 25, 1991 (age 35); Columbia, Missouri, U.S.
- Listed height: 6 ft 2 in (1.88 m)
- Listed weight: 247 lb (112 kg)

Career information
- High school: Rock Bridge (Columbia, Missouri)
- College: Oklahoma
- NFL draft: 2014: 7th round, 245th overall pick

Career history
- San Francisco 49ers (2014); Kansas City Chiefs (2016)

Awards and highlights
- 2× First-team All-Big 12 (2011, 2013); 2× Second-team All-Big 12 (2010, 2012)
- Stats at Pro Football Reference

Trey Millard (born July 25, 1991) is an American former football fullback. He was selected by the San Francisco 49ers in the seventh round of the 2014 NFL draft. He played college football at Oklahoma.

== Professional career ==
=== San Francisco 49ers ===
Millard was selected by the San Francisco 49ers in the seventh round of the 2014 NFL draft with the 245th overall pick. He was placed on the non-football injury list for the start of the 2014 NFL season.

On August 31, 2015, Millard was waived by the 49ers during the final preseason roster cuts.

=== Kansas City Chiefs ===
On January 5, 2016, Millard signed a futures contract with the Kansas City Chiefs.
