= Gabe Ikard =

American football player (born 1990)

No. 61, 60, 65, 69
- Position: Center

Personal information
- Born: September 26, 1990 (age 36); Oklahoma City, Oklahoma, U.S.
- Listed height: 6 ft 4 in (1.93 m)
- Listed weight: 300 lb (136 kg)

Career information
- High school: McGuinness (Oklahoma City)
- College: Oklahoma
- NFL draft: 2014: undrafted

Career history
- Tennessee Titans (2014); Buffalo Bills (2015); Cleveland Browns (2015); Detroit Lions (2015); Buffalo Bills (2016); Cleveland Browns (2016); Denver Broncos (2017)*; New Orleans Saints (2017–2018)*
- * Offseason or practice squad member only

Awards and highlights
- Wuerffel Trophy (2013); Consensus All-American (2013); Third-team All-American (2011); Freshman All-American (2010); 3× First-team All-Big 12 (2011–2013)
- Stats at Pro Football Reference

Gabe Ikard (born September 26, 1990) is an American former professional football player who was a center in the National Football League (NFL). He played college football for the Oklahoma Sooners, earning consensus All-American honors in 2013. He was signed by the Tennessee Titans as an undrafted free agent in 2014. He spent parts of four seasons on the active rosters of the Buffalo Bills, Cleveland Browns and Detroit Lions. Ikard was a radio host of “The Franchise Players” on 107.7 The Franchise in Oklahoma City. He also co-hosts “Big 12 Today” on Big 12 Radio (SiriusXM channel 375). He currently co-hosts "The Oklahoma Breakdown" a bi-weekly podcast dedicated primarily to Oklahoma Sooners football with fellow former Sooner Teddy Lehman.

== Early life ==
Ikard attended Bishop McGuinness High School in Oklahoma City, Oklahoma. He had 29 receptions for 542 yards and nine touchdowns as a tight end in 2008, and also recorded 68 tackles and two interceptions, including six sacks and one defensive touchdown. He was named district 4A-1 Defensive Player of the Year, and earned The Oklahoman Little All-City Defensive Player of the Year.

Considered a three-star recruit by Rivals.com, he was rated as the 15th best tight end prospect in the nation. He committed to Oklahoma over offers from Oklahoma State, Notre Dame and Stanford.

== College career ==
After redshirting in 2009, Ikard would become the starting left guard for Oklahoma in the final 12 games of the 2010 season, while appearing in all 14. In 2011, he started the first three games at left guard before sliding over to center for seven games due to an injury, then returning to left guard for the final three games of the season. He was named a third-team All-American by the Associated Press and first-team All-Big 12. In 2012, he played in 12 games, starting all 12 at center, while earning first-team All-Big 12 honours once again. In his final season in 2013, he started all 13 games while being named first-team All-Big 12 for the third consecutive season.

During his tenure, he was named an Academic All-American three times, and was named the Academic All-American of the Year in 2013.

== Professional career ==
Pre-draft measurables
Height	Weight	Arm length	Hand span	Wingspan	40-yard dash	10-yard split	20-yard split	20-yard shuttle	Three-cone drill	Vertical jump	Broad jump	Bench press	Wonderlic
6 ft 3 5/8 in (1.92 m)	304 lb (138 kg)	33 1/8 in (0.84 m)	9 5/8 in (0.24 m)	6 ft 6 3/4 in (2.00 m)	5.13 s	1.77 s	2.96 s	4.37 s	7.30 s	26 in (0.66 m)	8 ft 7 in (2.62 m)	22 reps	38
All values from NFL Combine

=== Tennessee Titans ===
Ikard signed with the Tennessee Titans as an undrafted free agent in 2014. He spent his entire rookie season on injured reserve following a knee injury in the preseason. He was released during final roster cuts in 2015.

=== Buffalo Bills (first stint) ===
On September 6, 2015, Ikard was claimed off waivers by the Buffalo Bills. On December 5, 2015, the team released Ikard.

=== Cleveland Browns (first stint) ===
On December 7, 2015, the Cleveland Browns claimed Ikard off waivers from the Bills after placing offensive guard Joel Bitonio on injured reserve. Ikard was waived on December 14, 2015 and was replaced by offensive lineman Kaleb Johnson.

=== Detroit Lions ===
On December 15, 2015, the Detroit Lions signed Ikard to the active roster after cutting right guard LaAdrian Waddle and placing tight end Brandon Pettigrew on injured reserve. On September 3, 2016, he was waived by the team.

=== Buffalo Bills (second stint) ===
On September 5, 2016, Ikard was signed to the Bills' practice squad. On September 15, 2016, Ikard was promoted to the active roster He was released on October 21, 2016.

=== Cleveland Browns (second stint) ===
Ikard was claimed off waivers by the Browns on October 24, 2016. On August 28, 2017, Ikard was released.

=== Denver Broncos ===
On October 26, 2017, Ikard was signed to the Denver Broncos' practice squad. He was released on December 5, 2017.

=== New Orleans Saints ===
On December 20, 2017, Ikard was signed to the New Orleans Saints' practice squad. He signed a reserve/future contract with them on January 16, 2018.

On April 5, 2018, Ikard announced his retirement from professional football, citing discomfort with having to maintain a weight over 300 pounds (140 kg) and a general frustration with how his NFL career turned out.

== Radio career ==
In summer of 2017, before he was signed to the Denver Broncos, Gabe Ikard joined the "Franchise Players" radio show on local Oklahoma City radio station 107.7 The Franchise with fellow Sooner Kelly Gregg.
