= Texas Longhorns football statistical leaders =

Individual statistical leaders of the Texas Longhorns football program

The Texas Longhorns football statistical leaders are individual statistical leaders of the Texas Longhorns football program in various categories, including passing, rushing, receiving, total offense, defensive stats, and kicking. Within those areas, the lists identify single-game, single-season, and career leaders. The Longhorns represent the University of Texas in the NCAA Division I FBS Southeastern Conference (SEC).

Although Texas began competing in intercollegiate football in 1893, the school's official record book considers the "modern era" to have begun in 1950. Records from before this year are often incomplete and inconsistent, and they are generally not included in these lists.

These lists are dominated by more recent players for several reasons:

- Since 1950, seasons have increased from 10 games to 11 and then 12 games in length.
- The NCAA didn't allow freshmen to play varsity football until 1972 (with the exception of the World War II years), allowing players to have four-year careers.
- Bowl games only began counting toward single-season and career statistics in 2002. The Longhorns have played in a bowl game in all but four seasons since then, allowing players to have at least one additional game to accumulate statistics. In 2024, the Longhorns reached the College Football Playoff semifinals, playing in a first-round game and two bowl games.
- During their tenure in the Big 12 Conference, the Longhorns played in the Big 12 Championship Game six times. In their first SEC season in 2024, they played in the SEC Championship Game. This has provided yet another game for players in those seasons.
- Since 2018, players have been allowed to participate in as many as four games in a redshirt season; previously, playing in even one game "burned" the redshirt. Since 2024, postseason games have not counted against the four-game limit. These changes to redshirt rules have given very recent players several extra games to accumulate statistics.
- All of the Longhorns' 10 highest seasons in points scored, and all but one of the top 10 seasons in offensive yards, came under former head coach Mack Brown, who coached Texas from 1998 through 2013.
- Due to COVID-19 issues, the NCAA ruled that the 2020 season would not count against the athletic eligibility of any football player, giving everyone who played in that season the opportunity for five years of eligibility instead of the normal four.

These lists are updated through Week 12 of the 2026 season. Active players are listed in bold.

== Passing ==
=== Passing yards ===
Career
Rank	Player	Yards	Years
1	Colt McCoy	13,253	2006 2007 2008 2009
2	Sam Ehlinger	11,436	2017 2018 2019 2020
3	Quinn Ewers	9,128	2022 2023 2024
4	Major Applewhite	8,353	1998 1999 2000 2001
5	James Brown	7,638	1994 1995 1996 1997
6	Peter Gardere	7,396	1989 1990 1991 1992
7	Chris Simms	7,097	1999 2000 2001 2002
8	**Arch Manning**	6,617	2023 2024 2025 2026
9	Vince Young	6,040	2003 2004 2005
10	Bret Stafford	4,735	1984 1985 1986 1987

Single season
Rank	Player	Yards	Year
1	Colt McCoy	3,859	2008
2	Sam Ehlinger	3,663	2019
3	Colt McCoy	3,521	2009
4	Quinn Ewers	3,479	2023
5	Quinn Ewers	3,472	2024
6	Major Applewhite	3,357	1999
7	Colt McCoy	3,303	2007
8	Sam Ehlinger	3,292	2018
9	Chris Simms	3,207	2002
10	Arch Manning	3,163	2025

Single game
Rank	Player	Yards	Year	Opponent
1	Major Applewhite	473	2001	Washington (Holiday Bowl)
2	Colt McCoy	470	2009	UCF
3	Quinn Ewers	452	2023	Oklahoma State
4	Sam Ehlinger	426	2020	UTEP
5	Chris Simms	419	2002	Nebraska
6	Colt McCoy	414	2008	Ohio State (Fiesta Bowl)
7	Major Applewhite	408	1998	Oklahoma State
8	Sam Ehlinger	401	2019	LSU
9	Sam Ehlinger	399	2019	Kansas
10	Bret Stafford	397	1986	Texas Tech

=== Passing touchdowns ===
Career
Rank	Player	TDs	Years
1	Colt McCoy	112	2006 2007 2008 2009
2	Sam Ehlinger	94	2017 2018 2019 2020
3	Quinn Ewers	68	2022 2023 2024
4	Major Applewhite	60	1998 1999 2000 2001
5	Chris Simms	58	1999 2000 2001 2002
6	**Arch Manning**	56	2023 2024 2025 2026
7	James Brown	53	1994 1995 1996 1997
8	Vince Young	44	2003 2004 2005
9	Peter Gardere	37	1989 1990 1991 1992
10	David Ash	31	2011 2012 2013 2014

Single season
Rank	Player	TDs	Year
1	Colt McCoy	34	2008
2	Sam Ehlinger	32	2019
3	Quinn Ewers	31	2024
4	Colt McCoy	29	2006
5	Colt McCoy	27	2009
6	Chris Simms	26	2002
	Vince Young	26	2005
	Sam Ehlinger	26	2020
	Arch Manning	26	2025
10	Sam Ehlinger	25	2018

Single game
Rank	Player	TDs	Year	Opponent
1	Colt McCoy	6	2006	Baylor
	Casey Thompson	6	2021	Kansas
3	James Brown	5	1994	Baylor
	Chris Simms	5	2001	Oklahoma State
	Colt McCoy	5	2008	Baylor
	Sam Ehlinger	5	2020	UTEP
	Sam Ehlinger	5	2020	Texas Tech
	Casey Thompson	5	2021	Texas Tech
	Casey Thompson	5	2021	Oklahoma
	Quinn Ewers	5	2024	Florida

== Rushing ==
=== Rushing yards ===
Career
Rank	Player	Yards	Years
1	Ricky Williams	6,279	1995 1996 1997 1998
2	Cedric Benson	5,540	2001 2002 2003 2004
3	Earl Campbell	4,443	1974 1975 1976 1977
4	Bijan Robinson	3,410	2020 2021 2022
5	Jamaal Charles	3,328	2005 2006 2007
6	Chris Gilbert	3,231	1966 1967 1968
7	Vince Young	3,127	2003 2004 2005
8	Roosevelt Leaks	2,923	1972 1973 1974
9	A. J. Jones	2,874	1978 1979 1980 1981
10	D'Onta Foreman	2,782	2014 2015 2016

Single season
Rank	Player	Yards	Year
1	Ricky Williams	2,124	1998
2	D'Onta Foreman	2,028	2016
3	Ricky Williams	1,893	1997
4	Cedric Benson	1,834	2004
5	Earl Campbell	1,744	1977
6	Jamaal Charles	1,619	2007
7	Bijan Robinson	1,580	2022
8	Roosevelt Leaks	1,415	1973
9	Cedric Benson	1,360	2003
10	Hodges Mitchell	1,343	1999

Single game
Rank	Player	Yards	Year	Opponent
1	Ricky Williams	350	1998	Iowa State
2	Roosevelt Leaks	342	1973	SMU
3	D'Onta Foreman	341	2016	Texas Tech
4	Ricky Williams	318	1998	Rice
5	Jamaal Charles	290	2007	Nebraska
6	Cedric Benson	283	2003	Texas A&M
7	Chris Warren III	276	2015	Texas Tech
8	Vince Young	267	2005	Oklahoma State
9	Hodges Mitchell	264	2000	Kansas
10	Ricky Williams	259	1998	Baylor
	Ricky Williams	259	1998	Texas A&M

=== Rushing touchdowns ===
Career
Rank	Player	TDs	Years
1	Ricky Williams	72	1995 1996 1997 1998
2	Cedric Benson	64	2001 2002 2003 2004
3	Earl Campbell	40	1974 1975 1976 1977
4	Vince Young	37	2003 2004 2005
5	Steve Worster	36	1968 1969 1970
	Jamaal Charles	36	2005 2006 2007
	Cody Johnson	36	2008 2009 2010 2011
8	Jim Bertelsen	33	1969 1970 1971
	Sam Ehlinger	33	2017 2018 2019 2020
	Bijan Robinson	33	2020 2021 2022

Single season
Rank	Player	TDs	Year
1	Ricky Williams	27	1998
2	Ricky Williams	25	1997
3	Cedric Benson	21	2003
4	Cedric Benson	19	2004
5	Earl Campbell	18	1977
	Jamaal Charles	18	2007
	Bijan Robinson	18	2022
8	Joe Bergeron	16	2012
	Sam Ehlinger	16	2018
10	D'Onta Foreman	15	2016

Single game
Rank	Player	TDs	Year	Opponent
1	Ricky Williams	6	1998	Rice
	Ricky Williams	6	1998	New Mexico State
3	Ricky Williams	5	1997	Rice
	Ricky Williams	5	1998	Iowa State
	Cedric Benson	5	2004	Oklahoma State
	Joe Bergeron	5	2012	Baylor

== Receiving ==
=== Receptions ===
Career
Rank	Player	Rec	Years
1	Jordan Shipley	248	2006 2007 2008 2009
2	Roy Williams	241	2000 2001 2002 2003
3	Jaxon Shipley	218	2011 2012 2013 2014
4	Quan Cosby	212	2005 2006 2007 2008
5	Mike Davis	200	2010 2011 2012 2013
6	Xavier Worthy	197	2021 2022 2023
7	Collin Johnson	188	2016 2017 2018 2019
8	Mike Adams	177	1992 1993 1994 1995
9	Devin Duvernay	176	2016 2017 2018 2019
10	Kwame Cavil	174	1997 1998 1999

Single season
Rank	Player	Rec	Year
1	Jordan Shipley	116	2009
2	Devin Duvernay	106	2019
3	Kwame Cavil	100	1999
4	Quan Cosby	92	2008
5	Jordan Shipley	89	2008
6	Lil'Jordan Humphrey	86	2018
7	Xavier Worthy	75	2023
8	Roy Williams	70	2003
	Nate Jones	70	2007
10	John Harris	68	2014

Single game
Rank	Player	Rec	Year	Opponent
1	Jordan Shipley	15	2008	Oklahoma State
2	Quan Cosby	14	2008	Ohio State (Fiesta Bowl)
	Xavier Worthy	14	2021	Kansas
4	Roy Williams	13	2002	Nebraska
5	Eric Metcalf	12	1988	Arkansas
	Devin Duvernay	12	2019	LSU
	Devin Duvernay	12	2019	Oklahoma State
8	Eric Metcalf	11	1987	Arkansas
	Kwame Cavil	11	1999	Iowa State
	Roy Williams	11	2001	Washington (Holiday Bowl)
	Jordan Shipley	11	2008	Oklahoma
	Jordan Shipley	11	2009	UCF
	Jordan Shipley	11	2009	Colorado
	Mike Davis	11	2010	Kansas State

=== Receiving yards ===
Career
Rank	Player	Yards	Years
1	Roy Williams	3,866	2000 2001 2002 2003
2	Jordan Shipley	3,191	2006 2007 2008 2009
3	Mike Adams	3,032	1992 1993 1994 1995 1996
4	Xavier Worthy	2,755	2021 2022 2023
5	Mike Davis	2,753	2010 2011 2012 2013
6	Collin Johnson	2,624	2016 2017 2018 2019
7	Quan Cosby	2,598	2005 2006 2007 2008
8	Jaxon Shipley	2,510	2011 2012 2013 2014
9	Devin Duvernay	2,468	2016 2017 2018 2019
10	B. J. Johnson	2,389	2000 2001 2002 2003

Single season
Rank	Player	Yards	Year
1	Jordan Shipley	1,485	2009
2	Devin Duvernay	1,386	2019
3	Kwame Cavil	1,188	1999
4	Lil'Jordan Humphrey	1,176	2018
5	Roy Williams	1,142	2002
6	Quan Cosby	1,123	2008
7	Wane McGarity	1,087	1998
8	Roy Williams	1,079	2003
9	Jordan Shipley	1,060	2008
10	John Harris	1,051	2014

Single game
Rank	Player	Yards	Year	Opponent
1	Jordan Shipley	273	2009	UCF
2	Xavier Worthy	261	2021	Oklahoma
3	Tony Jones	242	1987	Pittsburgh (Bluebonnet Bowl)
4	Devin Duvernay	199	2019	Texas Tech
5	Johnny “Lam” Jones	198	1979	Baylor
6	B. J. Johnson	187	2000	Texas A&M
	B. J. Johnson	187	2003	Iowa State
8	Ryan Wingo	184	2025	Mississippi State
9	Malcolm Williams	182	2008	Texas Tech
10	Eric Metcalf	181	1986	Houston

=== Receiving touchdowns ===
Career
Rank	Player	TDs	Years
1	Roy Williams	36	2000 2001 2002 2003
2	Jordan Shipley	33	2006 2007 2008 2009
3	Xavier Worthy	26	2021 2022 2023
4	Limas Sweed	20	2004 2005 2006 2007
5	Quan Cosby	19	2005 2006 2007 2008
6	Mike Davis	18	2010 2011 2012 2013
7	Mike Adams	16	1992 1993 1994 1995 1996
	B. J. Johnson	16	2000 2001 2002 2003
	Devin Duvernay	16	2016 2017 2018 2019
10	Lovell Pinkney	15	1992 1993 1994
	Collin Johnson	15	2016 2017 2018 2019
	David Thomas	15	2002 2003 2004 2005

Single season
Rank	Player	TDs	Year
1	Jordan Shipley	13	2009
2	Roy Williams	12	2002
	Limas Sweed	12	2006
	Xavier Worthy	12	2021
5	Jordan Shipley	11	2008
	Adonai Mitchell	11	2023
7	Herkie Walls	10	1982
	Quan Cosby	10	2008
9	Wane McGarity	9	1998
	Roy Williams	9	2003
	Lil'Jordan Humphrey	9	2018
	Devin Duvernay	9	2019
	Devin Duvernay	9	2019
	Joshua Moore	9	2020
	Matthew Golden	9	2024

Single game
Rank	Player	TDs	Year	Opponent
1	Wane McGarity	4	1998	Texas Tech

== Total offense ==
Total offense is the sum of passing and rushing statistics. It does not include receiving or returns.

=== Total offense yards ===
Career
Rank	Player	Yards	Years
1	Colt McCoy	14,824	2006 2007 2008 2009
2	Sam Ehlinger	13,339	2017 2018 2019 2020
3	Vince Young	9,167	2003 2004 2005
4	Quinn Ewers	9,072	2022 2023 2024
5	Major Applewhite	8,059	1998 1999 2000 2001
6	James Brown	8,049	1994 1995 1996 1997
7	Peter Gardere	7,409	1988 1989 1990 1991
8	**Arch Manning**	7,273	2023 2024 2025 2026
9	Chris Simms	6,960	1999 2000 2001 2002
10	Ricky Williams	6,306	1995 1996 1997 1998

Single season
Rank	Player	Yards	Year
1	Colt McCoy	4,420	2008
2	Sam Ehlinger	4,326	2019
3	Vince Young	4,086	2005
4	Colt McCoy	3,869	2009
5	Colt McCoy	3,795	2007
6	Sam Ehlinger	3,744	2018
7	Arch Manning	3,562	2025
8	Quinn Ewers	3,554	2023
9	Quinn Ewers	3,390	2024
10	Major Applewhite	3,211	1999

Single game
Rank	Player	Yards	Year	Opponent
1	Jerrod Heard	527	2015	California
2	Vince Young	506	2005	Oklahoma State
3	Sam Ehlinger	490	2019	Kansas
4	Sam Ehlinger	487	2017	Kansas State
5	Colt McCoy	483	2009	UCF
6	Colt McCoy	479	2009	Texas A&M
7	Major Applewhite	476	2001	Washington (Holiday Bowl)
8	Vince Young	467	2005	USC (Rose Bowl; National Championship Game)
9	Sam Ehlinger	461	2019	LSU
10	Quinn Ewers	458	2023	Oklahoma State

=== Touchdowns responsible for ===
"Touchdowns responsible for" is the NCAA's official term for combined passing and rushing touchdowns.

Career
Rank	Player	TDs	Years
1	Colt McCoy	132	2006 2007 2008 2009
2	Sam Ehlinger	127	2017 2018 2019 2020
3	Vince Young	81	2003 2004 2005
4	Quinn Ewers	76	2022 2023 2024
5	**Arch Manning**	74	2023 2024 2025 2026
6	Ricky Williams	73	1995 1996 1997 1998
7	Chris Simms	68	1999 2000 2001 2002
8	Cedric Benson	64	2001 2002 2003 2004
9	Major Applewhite	63	1998 1999 2000 2001
10	James Brown	59	1994 1995 1996 1997

Single season
Rank	Player	TDs	Year
1	Colt McCoy	45	2008
2	Sam Ehlinger	41	2018
3	Sam Ehlinger	39	2019
4	Vince Young	38	2005
5	Arch Manning	37	2025
6	Sam Ehlinger	34	2020
7	Quinn Ewers	33	2024
8	Colt McCoy	31	2006
9	Chris Simms	30	2002
	Colt McCoy	30	2009

Single game
Rank	Player	TDs	Year	Opponent
1	Casey Thompson	7	2021	Kansas
2	Ricky Williams	6	1998	Rice
	Ricky Williams	6	1998	New Mexico State
	Colt McCoy	6	2006	Baylor
	Sam Ehlinger	6	2020	Texas Tech
	Sam Ehlinger	6	2020	Oklahoma
	Casey Thompson	6	2021	Texas Tech

== Defense ==
=== Interceptions ===
Career
Rank	Player	Ints	Years
1	Noble Doss	17	1939 1940 1941
	Nathan Vasher	17	2000 2001 2002 2003
3	Jerry Gray	16	1981 1982 1983 1984
4	Derrick Hatchett	15	1977 1978 1979 1980
5	Bobby Dillon	13	1949 1950 1951
	Johnnie Johnson	13	1976 1977 1978 1979
	Stanley Richard	13	1987 1988 1989 1990
	Chris Carter	13	1993 1994 1995 1996
	Dylan Haines	13	2014 2015 2016
10	William Graham	11	1979 1980 1981
	Mossy Cade	11	1981 1982 1983
	Quandre Diggs	11	2011 2012 2013 2014

Single season
Rank	Player	Ints	Year
1	Earl Thomas	8	2009
2	Jack Crain	7	1940
	Noble Doss	7	1940
	William Graham	7	1981
	Jerry Gray	7	1984
	Nathan Vasher	7	2001

Single game
Rank	Player	Ints	Year	Opponent
1	Bill Bradley	4	1968	Texas A&M
2	Bobby Layne	3	1946	Baylor
	Bill Pyle	3	1948	North Carolina
	Jerry Cook	3	1961	Ole Miss (Cotton Bowl)
	Leslie Derrick	3	1966	Ole Miss (Bluebonnet Bowl)
	Stephen Braggs	3	1986	Texas Tech
	Tre Thomas	3	1995	Pittsburgh
	Aaron Humphrey	3	1997	Rutgers
	Jelani McDonald	3	2026	LSU

=== Tackles ===
Career
Rank	Player	Tackles	Years
1	Britt Hager	499	1984 1985 1986 1987
2	Doug Shankle	478	1978 1979 1980 1981
3	Derrick Johnson	458	2001 2002 2003 2004
4	Anthony Curl	403	1989 1990 1991 1992
5	Chris Carter	401	1993 1994 1995 1996
6	Dusty Renfro	370	1995 1996 1997 1998
7	Steve McMichael	369	1976 1977 1978 1979
8	Michael Griffin	364	2003 2004 2005 2006
9	Bruce Scholtz	351	1977 1978 1979 1980 1981
10	Tyson King	346	1993 1994 1995 1996

Single season
Rank	Player	Tackles	Year
1	Britt Hager	195	1988
2	Britt Hager	187	1987
3	Lionel Johnson	175	1976
4	Winfred Tubbs	157	1992
5	Bill Hamilton	154	1976
6	Tony Edwards	149	1984
7	Tony Degrate	147	1984
	Jordan Hicks	147	2014
9	Doug Shankle	144	1980
10	Steve McMichael	142	1978

=== Sacks ===
Career
Rank	Player	Sacks	Years
1	Kiki DeAyala	40.5	1980 1981 1982
2	Tim Campbell	39.5	1975 1976 1977 1978 1979
3	Tony Degrate	31.0	1981 1982 1983 1984
4	Bill Acker	29.0	1975 1976 1977 1978 1979
	Kenneth Sims	29.0	1978 1979 1980 1981
6	Steve McMichael	28.5	1976 1977 1978 1979
	Colin Simmons	28.5	2024 2025 2026
8	Jackson Jeffcoat	27.5	2010 2011 2012 2013
9	Ty Allert	27.0	1982 1983 1984 1985
10	Aaron Humphrey	24.5	1996 1997 1998 1999

Single season
Rank	Player	Sacks	Year
1	Kiki DeAyala	22.5	1982
2	Tim Campbell	14.0	1977
	Bill Acker	14.0	1978
	Ken McCune	14.0	1980
5	Tim Campbell	13.0	1975
	Dwight Jefferson	13.0	1978
	Jackson Jeffcoat	13.0	2013
8	Alex Okafor	12.5	2012
9	Steve McMichael	12.0	1977
	Kiki DeAyala	12.0	1981
	Tony Degrate	12.0	1984
	Colin Simmons	12.0	2025

Single game
Rank	Player	Sacks	Year	Opponent
1	Colin Simmons	5.5	2026	Tennessee
2	Shane Dronett	5.0	1990	Texas Tech
3	Alex Okafor	4.5	2012	Oregon State (Alamo Bowl)
4	Dwight Jefferson	4.0	1978	Arkansas
	Cedric Woodard	4.0	1998	Texas A&M
	Aaron Humphrey	4.0	1998	Texas Tech

== Kicking ==
=== Field goals made ===
Career
Rank	Player	FGs	Years
1	Bert Auburn	66	2021 2022 2023 2024
2	Cameron Dicker	60	2018 2019 2020 2021
3	Phil Dawson	59	1994 1995 1996 1997
4	Jeff Ward	58	1983 1984 1985 1986
5	Kris Stockton	58	1996 1998 1999 2000
6	Dusty Mangum	50	2001 2002 2003 2004
7	Russell Erxleben	49	1975 1976 1977 1978

Single season
Rank	Player	FGs	Year
1	Bert Auburn	29	2023
2	Hunter Lawrence	24	2009
3	Justin Tucker	23	2010
4	Kris Stockton	22	2000
5	Bert Auburn	21	2022
6	Michael Pollack	20	1990
	Kris Stockton	20	1999
	Anthony Fera	20	2013
	Mason Shipley	20	2025
10	Jeff Ward	19	1985
	Phil Dawson	19	1996

Single game
Rank	Player	FGs	Year	Opponent
1	Jeff Ward	5	1985	Arkansas
	Kris Stockton	5	2000	Texas Tech
	Ryan Bailey	5	2007	UCF
	Justin Tucker	5	2010	Baylor
	Bert Auburn	5	2023	Texas Tech

Longest Field Goal Made
Rank	Player	Yards	Year	Opponent
1	Russell Erxleben	67	1977	Rice
2	Russell Erxleben	64	1977	Oklahoma
3	Russell Erxleben	60	1977	Texas Tech
4	Russell Erxleben	59	1978	Texas A&M
5	Russell Erxleben	58	1977	Oklahoma
	Russell Erxleben	58	1977	Arkansas
7	Jeff Ward	57	1985	Texas A&M
	Russell Erxleben	57	1977	Boston College
	Russell Erxleben	57	1976	SMU
	Cameron Dicker	57	2019	Rice

Consecutive Field Goal Made
Rank	Player	FGs	Years
1	Bert Auburn	19	2023
2	Anthony Fera	15	2013
	Phil Dawson	15	1996-1997
4	Jeff Ward	13	1985
5	Cameron Dicker	12	2021
6	Bert Auburn	11	2022-2023

=== Field goal percentage ===
Career
Rank	Player	FG%	Years
1	Hunter Lawrence	87.2%	2006 2007 2008 2009
2	Ryan Bailey	83.3%	2006 2007 2008 2009
	Justin Tucker	83.3%	2008 2009 2010 2011
	Mason Shipley	83.3%	2025
5	Bert Auburn	76.7%	2021 2022 2023 2024
6	Cameron Dicker	75.9%	2018 2019 2020 2021
7	Kris Stockton	75.3%	1983 1984 1985 1986
8	Phil Dawson	74.7%	1994 1995 1996 1997

Single season
Rank	Player	FG%	Year
1	Jeff Ward	93.8%	1983
2	Anthony Fera	90.9%	2013
3	Hunter Lawrence	88.9%	2009
4	Cameron Dicker	86.7%	2021
5	Justin Tucker	85.2%	2010
6	Kris Stockton	84.6%	2000
7	Mason Shipley	83.3%	2025
8	Bert Auburn	82.9%	2023
9	Justin Tucker	81.0%	2011
