= B. J. Johnson =

B. J. Johnson may refer to:

- B. J. Johnson (American football) (born 1982), American football player
- B. J. Johnson (basketball) (born 1995), American basketball player
- B. J. Johnson (swimmer) (born 1987), American swimmer
