= Quan Cosby =

American football player (born 1982)

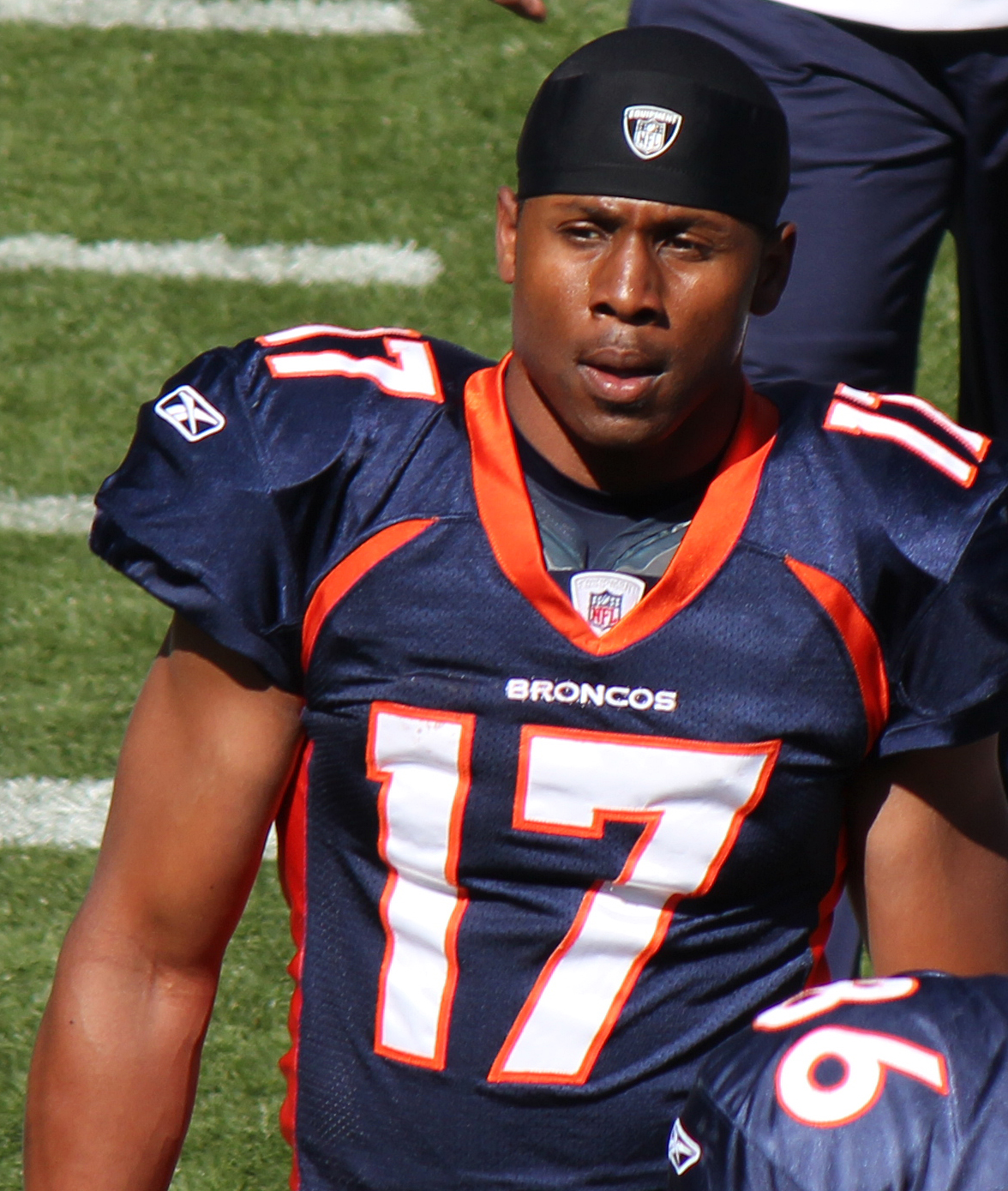
- Cosby with the Denver Broncos in 2011

No. 12, 17, 13
- Position: Wide receiver / Return specialist

Personal information
- Born: December 23, 1982 (age 43); Waco, Texas, U.S.
- Listed height: 5 ft 9 in (1.75 m)
- Listed weight: 196 lb (89 kg)

Career information
- High school: Mart (Mart, Texas)
- College: Texas
- NFL draft: 2009: undrafted

Career history
- Cincinnati Bengals (2009–2010); Denver Broncos (2011); Indianapolis Colts (2011–2012); Jacksonville Jaguars (2012)

Awards and highlights
- PFWA All-Rookie Team (2009); 2006 BCS national champion; 2006 Rose Bowl champion; 2009 Fiesta Bowl champion; 2007 Holiday Bowl champion; 2006 Alamo Bowl champion

Career NFL statistics
- Receptions: 6
- Receiving yards: 71
- Return yards: 1,853
- Stats at Pro Football Reference

Quantwan Juaray Cosby (born December 23, 1982) is an American former professional football player who was a Return specialist and wide receiver in the National Football League (NFL). He played for the Cincinnati Bengals, Denver Broncos, Indianapolis Colts, and the Jacksonville Jaguars over his four-year career. He played college football for the Texas Longhorns where he won a National Championship and still holds several school records.

Prior to attending Texas, he was a star athlete at Mart high School and then played four years of minor-league baseball for the Anaheim Angels organization.

== Early life ==
Cosby grew up Mart, TX where he was one of four boys including his twin brother Quincy. When he was in 9th grade he moved out of the house with his family, due to difficulties with his stepfather and into the home of a school friend whose parents pushed him to excel in school and gave him a spiritual life.

He attended Mart High School in Mart, Texas where he was a 2nd Team all-USA and five-time all-state football player, all-state track athlete and all state baseball player. He earned first-team all-state recognition as a quarterback and defensive back after leading Mart High School to a perfect record and the Class 2A state championship in 1999. In 2000, he again received first-team honors as a quarterback and defensive back, and also as a kick returner, as Mart finished as the Class 2A runner-up to Celina.

During the 1999 season, he rushed for 1,532 yards and 26 touchdowns on 112 carries, passed for 1,316 yards and 17 touchdowns, and scored on seven punt returns, two kickoff returns, and two interception returns. On defense he had 7 interceptions. In 2000, he was named the Class 2A Offensive Player of the Year for the second consecutive season after recording 1,924 rushing yards and 29 rushing touchdowns, 1,405 passing yards and 13 passing touchdowns, and seven additional touchdowns on returns (five punts, one kickoff, and one interception). In high school he had 480 career tackles and 21 career INTs.

In track he won individual state championships in the 100- and 200-meters in 2001.

In baseball, he hit .479 as a senior with 3 HRs and 33 RBIs; and stole 81-of-82 bases during his final two prep seasons.

In 2011 he was named to the Texas High School Sports Hall of Fame.

== Baseball career ==
Cosby was drafted in the sixth round of the 2001 Major League Baseball draft by the Anaheim Angels, 179th overall. Though he had many offers to play college football, he decided to give pro baseball a chance for four years. Over the next four seasons he played 340 games at Centerfield in the Angels' Rookie and Single A teams in Arizona, Provo, and Cedar Rapids. His rookie league team made it to the Championship game.

But he was frustrated by his inability to take classes while he played, so despite having his best season so far, he decided to go to college and play football.

== College football ==
Cosby attended the University of Texas where he played football from 2005 to 2008 and earned a degree in Social Work. He had signed with Texas in 2001 and signed with them again in 2005. While he was in school, he got married and had a child.

In 2005, he played in 9 games in the Longhorns consensus National Championship season. He recorded 15 receptions for 270 yards and 2 TDs as well a KR for 30 yards and 6 PRs for 92 yards. He had a career long 64-yard touchdown reception against Kansas that was the eighth longest reception in school history at the time. He played in both the Big 12 Conference Championship game and the BCS Championship game - both of which Texas won.

In 2006, he played in all 13 games and helped the Longhorns finish ranked #13 after winning the 2006 Alamo Bowl. He had 45 receptions for 454 yards and 2 TDs, including his first 100 yard+ game against Oklahoma State. He also had 15 returns for 398 yards, including a 55-yard punt return for a touchdown against Sam Houston State. Though just a sophomore, he was the team's second leading receiver. In the Alamo Bowl, he had 5 KRs for an Alamo Bowl record-setting 139 yards. That season, based on his high school experience, he was the team's emergency 3rd-string quarterback due to injuries and transfers, but he never had to play behind center.

In 2007 Cosby again played in all 13 games, was named second team All-Big 12 by the AP and an Honorable Mention by the coaches and helped Texas to a #10 ranking following a victory in the Holiday Bowl. He set the school records for kick returns and all returns in a season with 42 and 61 respectively and kick return and all return yards with 1,017 and 1,195 respectively including a 91-yard KR for a touchdown against Texas A&M. His 1,195 total return yards was the 2nd most for a season in Big 12 history at the time. He and Nate Jones teamed up for 130 receptions, which was at the time the second most by a pair of Texas receivers in a season behind Kwame Cavil and Ryan Nunez who had 156 in 1999. Cosby led the team with 1,857 all-purpose yards (sixth best in school history at the time), averaging 24.2 yards per KR (7th best in school history at the time), was the team's second leading receiver again. In the Holiday Bowl he caught a 55-yard touchdown pass, which was the 12th longest reception in a bowl game in school history at the time.

In 2008, Cosby was named a team captain, along with Colt McCoy, Roy Miller and Brian Orakpo on a team that won a share of the Big 12 South and finished ranked #3 after winning the 2009 Fiesta Bowl. With Jordan Shipley he formed the most successful receiving duo in school history recording more receptions (181) and yards (2,183) in a season than any other pair of receivers. Against Oklahoma, for the first time in school history, Texas had a 100-yard rusher (Chris Ogbonnaya with 127 yards) and two 100-yard receivers - Cosby with 122 yards and Shipley with 112 yards. That season he led the team with 92 receptions and 1,123 receiving yards (both of which were second most in school history at the time); and was again named second team All-Big 12 by the AP and an Honorable mention by the coaches. He had fewer TD receptions than Shipley that year, but was tied for third most in a season in school history with Herkie Walls behind Shipley and Limas Sweed. He was also just 39 yards behind Shipley with 1,511 all-purpose yards. At the Fiesta Bowl, he set the school record for most receptions in a game with 14, which is still the school record for a bowl game, had a career high 171 receiving yards (the second most in a bowl game in school history) and tied the school record for TD receptions in a bowl game (2). He also caught the game winning touchdown pass with 16 seconds left in the game. That season he made the First Team Academic All-Big 12 and was a Biletnikoff Award semifinalist. His 14 catches were the second most ever at the Fiesta Bowl.

He finished his career with 72 kick returns for 1,731 yards, both school records; 212 receptions, second most in school history at the time behind only Roy Williams; 2,598 yards receiving, third most in school history at the time behind Williams and Mike Adams; 19 career receiving TDs, fourth most in school history at the time behind Williams, Shipley and Sweed; 11.3 yards per punt return, fifth best in school history at the time; a 24.2 yard average KR, sixth best in school history at the time; and 4,701 career all-purpose yards, sixth best in school history at the time. Between 2005 and 2008 he caught a pass in 44 consecutive games, the second longest streak in school history behind Williams. He was also at the time one of only three Longhorns to return both a punt and a kickoff for a touchdown in his career. He and Colt McCoy were the school's all-time leaders for completions between a QB and a WR with 191.

After his college career was over, he played in the 2009 Senior Bowl.

In 2023 he was named to the Texas Longhorn Hall of Honor.

== Professional career ==
=== Cincinnati Bengals ===
Despite some expectation that he would be drafted, Cosby was passed over in the 2009 NFL draft. He was signed by the Cincinnati Bengals as an undrafted free agent on May 1, 2009.

He made the roster for the Bengals, helped in no small part by a 49 yard punt return for a touchdown in a preseason game against the Rams.

In 2009 he was a returner for the Bengals, leading the league in punt returns and punt return yards. He also returned kick offs, played wide receiver and was on the coverage team. He returned 40 punts for 474 yards including a long of 60 yards, and 13 kick offs for 239 yards. He was 4th in the league in punt return average with 11.9 yards per return. As a receiver he caught 4 passes on 6 targets for 55 yards and ran the ball once for a two-yard loss. He also had a combined 3 tackles on the coverage team. In his one career playoff game he had 3 receptions on 4 targets for 26 yards. His performance earned him the PR spot on the 2009 NFL All-Rookie team.

Cosby was again Cincinnati's leading punt returner in 2011, returning 30 punts for 225 yards. He also returned 3 kick-offs for 35 yards, had 2 receptions on 2 passes for 16 yards and made 9 combined tackles on the coverage team. He finished 10th in the league in punt returns, but the team struggled and came in 4th in the division.

Late in the 2011 offseason, the Bengals re-signed Cosby, but they cut him at the end of camp to make room for free agent Brandon Tate. He left with the Bengals all-time highest punt return average of 10 yards per punt. He also had 40 fair catches without a fumble.

=== Denver Broncos ===
Two weeks into the 2011 season he was signed off of waivers by the Denver Broncos to replace the injured Eddie Royal. Despite playing in only 10 games with the Broncos - he was inactive for two games in November, he led them in punt returns (27), kick returns (17), punt return yards (269) and kick return yards (457). He fumbled the ball in each of his last two games, and had trouble handling kicks against New England leading to him being inactive then next week and then waived before the last game of the season. He also recorded a tackle that season.

=== Indianapolis Colts ===
The day after he was waived by the Broncos, Cosby was signed by the Indianapolis Colts. He was inactive for the Colts last game. The next season he was waived by the Colts at the end of camp.

=== Jacksonville Jaguars ===
12 weeks into the 2012 season, Cosby was signed by the Jacksonville Jaguars where he was reunited with former Bengals offensive coordinator Bob Bratkowski and former Longhorn WR Jordan Shipley. Jacksonville had struggled to find an effective punt returner, trying Maurice Jones-Drew, Mike Thomas, former Longhorn teammate Aaron Ross, Shipley and Micheal Spurlock - who was cut at the same time Cosby was signed. Cosby played in two games for the Jaguars - and looked particularly good in the first one, but was inactive in the next and was waived with two games remaining in the season during which Shipley retained PR duties. With the Jaguars he returned 5 punts for 46 yards and 5 kickoffs for 99 yards.

He finished his NFL career ranked #130 for career punt returns with 102 and tied for 23rd in average punt return yards with 9.9 per punt.

== Personal life ==
Cosby returned to Texas after his playing career was over. He became a TV and radio announcer for Longhorns football and baseball for 7 years and he served as president of the Student Athlete Advisory Committee. He later became the liaison for UT external affairs in the Office of Governmental Affairs and Initiatives and a partner with an insurance Agency.

In 2023, Cosby was awarded the Presidential Citation for Service to UT from the University of Texas at Austin.

His older brother played college football at Howard Payne University and his twin played at Baylor.
