= Kwame Cavil =

American football player (born 1979)

No. 82
- Position: Wide receiver

Personal information
- Born: May 3, 1979 (age 47); Waco, Texas, U.S.
- Listed height: 6 ft 2 in (1.88 m)
- Listed weight: 205 lb (93 kg)

Career information
- College: Texas

Career history
- 2000--2001: Buffalo Bills*
- 2002: Scottish Claymores
- 2002: Berlin Thunder
- 2002: Cleveland Browns*
- 2002–2005: Montreal Alouettes
- 2005: Edmonton Eskimos
- 2006: Hamilton Tiger-Cats
- 2006: Winnipeg Blue Bombers
- 2007: Hamilton Tiger-Cats*
- * Offseason or practice squad member only

Awards and highlights
- 2× Grey Cup champion (2002, 2005); CFL East All-Star (2004); World Bowl champion (2002); First-team All-Big 12 (1999)

Career CFL statistics
- Receptions: 193
- Receiving yards: 2,328 yards (avg: 12.1 yards)
- Receiving TDs: 12
- Longest reception: 72 yards
- Fumbles: 5
- Stats at Pro Football Reference

Kwame Sekou Cavil (born May 3, 1979) is an American former professional football player who was a wide receiver in the National Football League (NFL), Canadian Football League (CFL) where he won two Grey Cups and the NFL Europe where he won a World Bowl. He was also an All-American college football player for the Texas Longhorns.

== Early life ==
Cavil was born in Waco, TX in 1979. He played high school football at Waco High School where he played linebacker and safety, earning second team 5A All-State honors at the linebacker position in 1996.

== College career ==
Cavil played college football at the University of Texas at Austin from 1997 to 1999.

At the start of his freshman year in 1997 he convinced coach John Mackovic to let him try playing wide receiver. Though he had never played the position before, he was impressive enough in practice for the coaches to move him to that position.

That year he led the team with receiving yards and had his first 100-yard receiving game, collecting 7 receptions for 112 yards against Texas Tech. He and Jamel Thompson set the school record for receptions by a freshman in that game and Cavil had the 3rd most yards by a freshman in a single game at the time. That season he and Thompson set the school record for receptions by a freshman duo with 39.

In 1998 he and Wane McGarity set the school's single season record for most receptions by a duo with 109 total receptions and most yards with 1,862. He had 51 of those receptions, which was 6th most in school history at the time. He had x 100 yard receiving games including 102 yards against Iowa State, 109 yards against Oklahoma State and 128 yards against UCLA. At the end of the season he was named 3rd Team All-Big 12. He helped get the Longhorns to the 1999 Cotton Bowl which they won for the first time since 1982 and where Cavil had 3 catches for 31 yards and a touchdown.

In 1999 He helped the Longhorns win the Big 12 South and earn a trip to the Cotton Bowl. He had a team-high 90 yards receiving on 5 receptions in the Big 12 Championship game. He set school and Big 12 single-season records for receptions (100) and receiving yards (1,188), with big performances against Iowa State (11 receptions for 109 yards), Texas Tech (10 receptions) and Texas A&M (10 receptions). His 100 receptions in a season, was the 20th most in NCAA history at the time. His 11 reception game was the 2nd most in school history at the time, and the 10 reception games were tied for 4th most. Both of his season-long records were broken by Jordan Shipley in 2009 and his Big 12 single-season receptions record was broken by Rashaun Woods of Oklahoma State in 2002. With Ryan Nunez he broke his own record for most receptions by a duo with 156, which was broken in 2008 by Quan Cosby and Shipley along with the record for most yards by a duo. He set, and still holds, the record for receiving yards in a game by a junior with 180 versus Stanford - that was the 4th most single-game receiving yards by a Longhorn at the time; and a 103 yard game against Kansas State. At the end of the season he was named an AP 2nd Team All-American and consensus 1st Team All-Big 12. That season he led the Big 12 with 91.4 receiving yards per game and 7.7 receptions per game. He was named the team's Outstanding Wide Receiver and Offensive MVP.

Cavil, along with linebacker Jamal Joyner and defensive ends Aaron Humphrey and J.J. Kelly. was suspended from the team prior to the Cotton Bowl, for "violation of team rules." The nature of the violation was not specified by Brown, Cavil, or the university.

After his junior year was over, he elected to leave the university for the NFL. It is uncertain if Cavil would have been welcomed back to the team for his senior season if he had not left early, but it was reported at the time that Brown says he never tells players what to do if they are considering entering the NFL draft early, implying that it was in fact an early departure for the draft. Cavil himself said "After great deliberation with my family, I have decided to forgo my final year of eligibility and go to the NFL," Cavil subsequently went undrafted.

When he left, he had the school's 2nd most career receptions with 174, just 3 behind Mike Adams, and 2nd most career receiving yards with 2,279, again behind Adams, despite leaving a year early.

He was the first player ever to leave one of Mack Brown's Texas teams with college eligibility remaining.

After his professional football career, Cavil returned to the University of Texas to complete his studies, earning his bachelor's degree from the College of Education in the Spring of 2010.

== Professional career ==
=== Buffalo Bills ===
Cavil was undrafted but signed as a free agent with the NFL Buffalo Bills in 2000. After missing a couple of weeks for training camp with a strained calf muscle, he appeared in 16 games that season at wide receiver and on special teams, making four catches for 66 yards, 10 tackles and a 1 yard kickoff return.

He was released by the Bills at the end of the 2001 training camp.

=== Scottish Claymores ===
In early 2002 he was signed by the Cleveland Browns and a few days later he was allocated to the Scottish Claymores of the NFL Europe. He played in 9 games, catching 15 passes for 197 yards.

=== Berlin Thunder ===
Because Cavil finished the season on the Claymore's practice squad, he was eligible to be moved to any other team in the league if they suffered an injury crisis. Berlin Thunder were two men down going into World Bowl following their game against Frankfurt Galaxy and they pulled Cavil and linebacker Mawuko Tugbenyoh onto their roster following the end of the regular season.

Kavil came in as a substitution, catching a single 27 yard reception on 5 targets as Berlin won World Bowl X.

=== Cleveland Browns ===
Following the NFL Europe season he went to the Browns' training camp and was cut by them at the end of camp.

=== Montreal Alouettes ===
In October, Cavil signed with the Montreal Alouettes of the Canadian Football League (CFL) He played in 1 game where he made a single reception for 19 yards and a touchdown and helped them win the 2002 Grey Cup.

He was re-signed by the Alouettes in 2003, appearing in 12 games, pulling down 57 receptions for 686 yards and 2 TDs to be the team's third leading receiver. He helped the Alouettes make it the Grey Cup game, coming through with a key touchdown in the 3rd quarter of the Eastern Conference Championships, but he recorded no touches in the 91st Grey Cup which Montreal lost 34-22.

In 2004 he played in 18 games for the Alouettes, catching 78 passes for 1090 yards and 7 TDs. The 2004 Alouettes was the first in CFL history to have a quartette of receivers in a single season each reach the 1000-yard receiving plateau. He was again the team's 3rd leading receiver and, for the first and only time, a CFL All-Star. He also had 6 rushes for 38 yards and a touchdown.

In 2005, he played in 3 games for the Alouettes, catching 11 passes for 118 yards before he was traded to Edmonton mid-season for defensive lineman Clinton Wayne..

=== Edmonton Eskimos ===
Following his trade, Cavil played in 7 games for the Edmonton Eskimos, recording 31 receptions for 259 yards and a TD; and two defensive tackles. With them he won his second Grey Cup, though he missed the final five games of the regular season and all of the playoffs due to injury.

=== Hamilton Tiger-Cats ===
Before the 2006 season, Edmonton traded him to the Hamilton Tiger-Cats for a 2006 fourth round draft pick. After being benched for the first 4 games of the season, he played in 4 games for the Tiger-Cats, catching 8 passes for 49 yards, before they traded him to the Winnipeg Blue Bombers for a third round pick in the 2007 CFL draft.

=== Winnipeg Blue Bombers ===
Cavil played in 2 games for the Blue Bombers in 2006, catching 7 passes for 107 yards and 2 touchdowns, including a career long 72 yard reception. The Blue Bombers made it to the playoffs, losing in the Eastern Semi-final to the Toronto Argonauts which featured Cavil's former college teammate Ricky Williams.

=== Hamilton Tiger-Cats (second stint) ===
At the end of the 2006 season he became a free agent. He failed to reach an agreement with Winnipeg and in March 2007 he was signed by the Tiger-Cats, but was released later without playing.

== Coaching career ==
After his playing career, Kavil became a teacher and high school football coach. In 2008 he was at St. Michael's Catholic Academy and St. Stephen's Episcopal School in Austin before teaching speech communication and coaching DBs at Manor High School, Temple High School, and LBJ High School in Austin.

In 2018, he was hired as the head football coach at his alma mater, Waco High School, where he graduated in 1997. He went 3-24 in three seasons at the helm from 2018-20.

He was later hired as the head coach for strength and conditioning classes at the Round Rock Sports Center.
