= Mike Davis (wide receiver) =

American football player (born 1992)

Profile
- Position: Wide receiver

Personal information
- Born: May 11, 1992 (age 34); Dallas, Texas, U.S.
- Listed height: 6 ft 0 in (1.83 m)
- Listed weight: 197 lb (89 kg)

Career information
- High school: Skyline (Dallas, Texas)
- College: Texas
- NFL draft: 2014: undrafted

Career history
- Oakland Raiders (2014)*; Toronto Argonauts (2015)*; Montreal Alouettes (2016)*
- * Offseason or practice squad member only

Awards and highlights
- Holiday Bowl Champion - (2011); Alamo Bowl Champion - (2012)
- Stats at Pro Football Reference

Mike Davis (born May 11, 1992) is an American former professional and college football wide receiver. He played college football at Texas.

== High school ==
Davis attended Skyline High School in Dallas, Texas, where he was a prep All-Amercian, two-time all-state, two-time first-team all-area and all-district performer at wide receiver. He recorded 129 catches for 2,764 yards and 39 TDs over his final three seasons, helping Skyline post a 37-4 record and reach the state semifinals. He also played in the 2010 Under Armour All-America Game, finishing as the game’s leading receiver with three catches for 53 yards and a TD.

He was also a three-year letterman in basketball who helped Skyline advance to the Area Round of the Texas 5A basketball tournament.

Considered a four-star recruit by Rivals.com, he was rated as the 4th best wide receiver prospect in the nation.

== College career ==
Davis attended the University of Texas at Austin from 2010 to 2013, where he played for the Texas Longhorns football team. He led the team in receiving yards in 2011, 2012 and 2013.

In his freshman year he played in 11 games, recording 47 catches for 478 yards and 2 TDs and breaking or tying several school records for freshmen. Against Kansas State he set the school record for receptions by freshman in a single game, with 11, which was also then tied for 4th in school history. It was one of two 100-yard games he had that season, which was also a Texas freshman record at the time. His 47 receptions were another school record for freshmen at the time. His receiving yards were the 3rd most by a freshman in school history at the time. Despite his efforts, the Longhorns struggled to a 5-7 record. He also returned a pair of punts.

In his sophomore year he played in all 13 games, making 45 catches for 605 yards and a touchdown, including 10 receptions against Oklahoma State, as he helped Texas to an 8-5 record and a Holiday Bowl win.

In his junior year, he set career highs for receptions (57) and receiving yards (939) and led the team in all-purpose yards. His 57 receptions was tied for 10th most in a single season in school history at the time. He had 7 touchdown catches and helped Texas to a final #18/#19 ranking and a win in the Alamo Bowl. He finished 9th in the Big 12 for receiving yards, 4th for receiving yards/catch, and 8th for touchdown catches. He was also named an Honorable Mention All-Big 12 wide receiver. In a game against Mississippi, he combined with Malcolm Brown and Marquise Goodwin to have a 100 yard rusher an two 100-yard receivers in the same game for only the 2nd time in school history at the time. With Jaxon Shipley he formed the 5th most productive receiving duo in school history at the time.

In the game against Texas Tech, Mike Davis - in response to the "Horns Down" hand signal - did a guns down hand sign for which he was penalized. Afterwards coach Mack Brown suggested that "Horns Down" should also get flagged, but no rule change ever resulted. Nonetheless, this is considered by some as the beginning of the Horns Down controversy.

In 2013, he seriously considered entering the 2013 NFL draft, but changed his mind and returned to Texas for his senior season. In 12 games he had 51 receptions for 727 yards and a career high 8 touchdowns, then tied for 8th most in school history, and he was named 2nd Team All-Big 12 by the AP and an Honorable Mention by the coaches. He had 3 games in a row with a TD reception, tied at the time for 6th most in school history. He helped the Longhorns get to the Alamo Bowl, which they lost to Oregon.

He finished his career with 200 receptions for 2,753 yards, both were 4th most in school history at the time, and 18 receiving touchdowns, which was 5th most in school history at the time; and he had ten 100-yard receiving games.

Afterwards he competed in the 2013 Senior Bowl.

== Professional career ==
Pre-draft measurables
Height	Weight	Arm length	Hand span	Wingspan	40-yard dash	10-yard split	20-yard split	20-yard shuttle	Three-cone drill	Vertical jump	Broad jump	Bench press
6 ft 0 in (1.83 m)	197 lb (89 kg)	32 3/4 in (0.83 m)	10 in (0.25 m)	6 ft 5 3/8 in (1.97 m)	4.50 s	1.57 s	2.60 s	4.39 s	7.11 s	32.5 in (0.83 m)	9 ft 9 in (2.97 m)	10 reps
All values from NFL Combine/Pro Day

=== Oakland Raiders ===
Despite meeting with the Ravens at teh NFL Combine and being projected as a mid-round pick, Davis went undrafted. He was quickly signed to a three-year contract with the Oakland Raiders on May 10, 2014. In their first pre-season game he had 2 receptions for 8 yards, but had no targets in the next two games. He was released on August 24, 2014 after the 3rd preseason game.

=== Toronto Argonauts ===
On February 24, 2015, Davis signed with the Toronto Argonauts of the Canadian Football League. He was released by the Argonauts on May 13, 2015.

In July he had a tryout with the Carolina Panthers.

A few days later he worked out for the Kansas City Chiefs.

=== Montreal Alouettes ===
In 2016, Davis was signed by the Montreal Alouettes of the Canadian Football League before camp and waived at the end of the preseason on June 19th.

He went back to Texas and finished his studies, earning a degree in Youth and Community Studies with a minor in Sociology.

=== The Spring League ===
In spring of 2018, Davis participated in The Spring League practices and games.
