= 2019 Texas Longhorns football team =

American college football season

2019 Texas Longhorns football

Alamo Bowl champion

Alamo Bowl, W 38–10 vs. Utah
- Conference: Big 12 Conference

Ranking
- AP: No. 25
- Record: 8–5 (5–4 Big 12)
- Head coach: Tom Herman (3rd season)
- Offensive coordinator: Tim Beck (3rd season)
- Co-offensive coordinator: Herb Hand (2nd season)
- Offensive scheme: Spread
- Defensive coordinator: Todd Orlando (3rd season)
- Co-defensive coordinator: Craig Naivar (1st season)
- Base defense: 3–4
- Home stadium: Darrell K Royal–Texas Memorial Stadium

Uniform
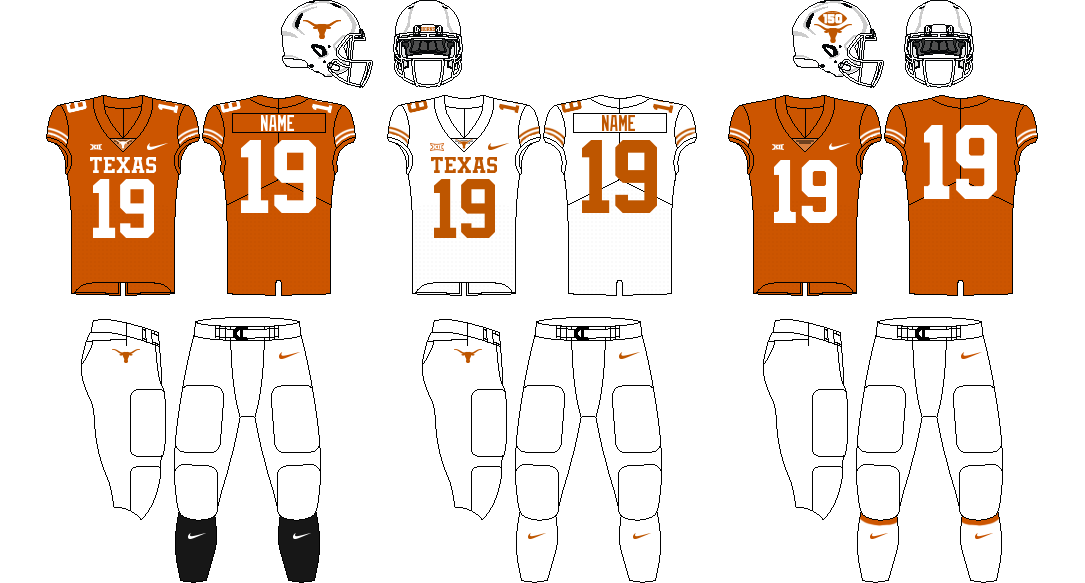

2019 Big 12 Conference football standings
	Conf.			Overall
Team	W		L	W		L
No. 7 Oklahoma y$^	8	–	1	12	–	2
No. 13 Baylor y	8	–	1	11	–	3
No. 25 Texas	5	–	4	8	–	5
Oklahoma State	5	–	4	8	–	5
Kansas State	5	–	4	8	–	5
Iowa State	5	–	4	7	–	6
West Virginia	3	–	6	5	–	7
TCU	3	–	6	5	–	7
Texas Tech	2	–	7	4	–	8
Kansas	1	–	8	3	–	9
Championship: Oklahoma 30, Baylor 23 ^{OT}
^ – College Football Playoff participant; $ – Conference champion; y – Championship game participant; Rankings from AP Poll

The 2019 Texas Longhorns football team, known variously as "Texas", "UT", the "Longhorns", or the "Horns”, represented the University of Texas at Austin during the 2019 NCAA Division I FBS football season. The Longhorns played their home games at Darrell K Royal–Texas Memorial Stadium in Austin, Texas. They are a charter member of the Big 12 Conference. They were led by third-year head coach Tom Herman.

Having ended their Big 12 play tied for third place in the conference standings, the Longhorns upset the No. 10 Utah Utes in the 2019 Alamo Bowl to finish the season 8-5 and ranked No. 25.

== Preseason ==
=== Big 12 media poll ===
The 2019 Big 12 media days were held July 15–16, 2019 in Frisco, Texas. In the Big 12 preseason media poll, Texas was predicted to finish in second in the standings behind Oklahoma.

=== Preseason All-Big 12 teams ===
To be released

== Schedule ==
Date	Time	Opponent	Rank	Site	TV	Result	Attendance
August 31	7:00 p.m.	Louisiana Tech*	No. 10	Darrell K Royal–Texas Memorial Stadium; Austin, TX	LHN	W 45–14	93,418
September 7	6:30 p.m.	No. 6 LSU*	No. 9	Darrell K Royal–Texas Memorial Stadium; Austin, TX (College GameDay)	ABC	L 38–45	98,763
September 14	7:00 p.m.	at Rice*	No. 12	NRG Stadium; Houston, TX (rivalry)	CBSSN	W 48–13	42,417
September 21	6:30 p.m.	Oklahoma State	No. 12	Darrell K Royal–Texas Memorial Stadium; Austin, TX	ABC	W 36–30	96,936
October 5	2:30 p.m.	at West Virginia	No. 11	Mountaineer Field; Morgantown, WV	ABC	W 42–31	62,069
October 12	11:00 a.m.	vs. No. 6 Oklahoma	No. 11	Cotton Bowl; Dallas, TX (Red River Showdown, Big Noon Kickoff)	FOX	L 27–34	92,100
October 19	6:00 p.m.	Kansas	No. 15	Darrell K Royal–Texas Memorial Stadium; Austin, TX	LHN	W 50–48	97,137
October 26	2:30 p.m.	at TCU	No. 15	Amon G. Carter Stadium; Fort Worth, TX (rivalry)	FOX	L 27–37	47,660
November 9	2:30 p.m.	No. 16 Kansas State^{†}		Darrell K Royal–Texas Memorial Stadium; Austin, TX	ESPN	W 27–24	97,833
November 16	2:30 p.m.	at Iowa State	No. 19	Jack Trice Stadium; Ames, IA	FS1	L 21–23	58,946
November 23	2:30 p.m.	at No. 10 Baylor		McLane Stadium; Waco, TX (rivalry)	FS1	L 10–24	49,109
November 29	11:00 a.m.	Texas Tech		Darrell K Royal–Texas Memorial Stadium; Austin, TX (rivalry)	FOX	W 49–24	93,747
December 31	6:30 p.m.	vs. No. 12 Utah*		Alamodome; San Antonio, TX (Alamo Bowl)	ESPN	W 38–10	60,147
*Non-conference game; ^{†}Homecoming; Rankings from AP Poll and CFP Rankings after November 5 released prior to game; All times are in Central time

== Personnel ==
=== Coaching staff ===
Name	Position	Alma mater	Joined staff
Tom Herman	Head coach	Cal Lutheran (1997)	2017
Tim Beck	Offensive coordinator / quarterbacks	UCF (1988)	2017
Stan Drayton	Associate head coach / run game coordinator	Allegheny College (1993)	2017
Oscar Giles	Defensive line	Texas (1991)	2017
Herb Hand	Co-offensive coordinator / Offensive Line	Hamilton College (1990)	2018
Tom leogrande	Wide receivers		2017
Drew Mehringer	Pass game coordinator / wide receivers	Rice (2010)	2017
Craig Naivar	Co-defensive coordinator / Safeties	Hardin–Simmons (1994)	2017
Todd Orlando	Defensive coordinator / Linebackers	Wisconsin (1994)	2017
Derek Warehime	Special teams coordinator / tight ends	Tulsa (2006)	2017
Jason Washington	Recruiting coordinator / Cornerbacks	Texas State (2002)	2017
Yancy McKnight	Head Strength and Conditioning	Missouri Southern (2001)	2017

=== Roster ===
2019 Texas Longhorns football
Quarterback: 2 Roschon Johnson – freshman (6'2, 220); 8 Casey Thompson – (redshirt) freshman (6'1, 195); 11 Sam Ehlinger – junior (6'3, 230); 14 Sam Saxton – freshman (6'5, 205); 16 Ben Ballard – freshman (5'11, 195); Running back: 21 Jordan Whittington – freshman (6'1, 215); 23 Jarrett Smith – (redshirt) freshman (5'7, 200); 24 Derrian Brown – freshman (5'10, 180); 26 Keaontay Ingram – sophomore (6'0, 220); 28 Kirk Johnson – (redshirt) senior (6'0, 215); 32 Daniel Young – junior (6'0, 220); 37 Jaren Watkins – sophomore (5'5, 160); Wide receiver: 1 John Burt – senior (6'3, 205); 6 Devin Duvernay – senior (5'11, 210); 9 Collin Johnson – senior (6'6, 220); 13 Brennan Eagles – sophomore (6'4, 225); 14 Joshua Moore – sophomore (6'1, 180); 15 Marcus Washington – freshman (6'2, 200); 16 Jake Smith – freshman (6'0, 200); 19 Kartik Akkihal – (redshirt) freshman (6'2, 200); 38 Parker Alford – freshman (5'10, 175); 80 Kai Money – (redshirt) freshman (6'0, 165); 83 Al’Vonte Woodard – (redshirt) freshman (6'2, 210); 84 Kennedy Lewis – freshman (6'3, 200); 85 Malcolm Epps – (redshirt) freshman (6'6, 245); 86 Jordan Pouncey – (redshirt) sophomore (6'2, 205); 88 Kai Jarmon – (redshirt) sophomore (6'0, 190); 89 Travis West – (redshirt) freshman (6'0, 180); Tight end: 18 Jared Wiley – freshman (6'7, 255); 42 Nathan Hatter – freshman (6'2, 260); 80 Cade Brewer – junior (6'4, 250); 81 Reese Leitao – (redshirt) freshman (6'4, 245); 87 Austin Hibbetts – (redshirt) sophomore (6'2, 235); 89 Brayden Liebrock – freshman (6'4, 230); Kicker/Punter: 8 Ryan Bujcevski – P – sophomore (6'0, 185); 17 Cameron Dicker – K – sophomore (6'1, 205); 45 Chris Naggar – K – (redshirt) junior (6'1, 195)	Offensive line: 51 Jakob Sell – (redshirt) sophomore (6'3, 305); 52 Sam Cosmi – (redshirt) sophomore (6'7, 300); 55 Willie Tyler – sophomore (6'7, 340); 56 Zach Shackelford – senior (6'4, 305); 61 Ishan Rison – (redshirt) junior (6'0, 260); 63 Troy Torres – (redshirt) freshman (6'0, 305); 64 Michael Balis – freshman (6'5, 305); 65 Isaiah Hookfin – freshman (6'5, 305); 66 Chad Wolf – freshman (6'3, 280); 67 Tope Imade – (redshirt) junior (6'5, 350); 68 Derek Kerstetter – junior (6'5, 300); 70 Christian Jones – (redshirt) freshman (6'6, 300); 71 J.P. Urquidez – (redshirt) junior (6'7, 300); 72 Tyler Johnson – freshman (6'6, 315); 73 Parker Braun – senior (6'3, 300); 74 Rafiti Ghirmai – (redshirt) freshman (6'5, 295); 75 Junior Angilau – (redshirt) freshman (6'6, 300); 76 Reese Moore – (redshirt) freshman (6'7, 295); 77 Javonne Shepherd – freshman (6'6, 315); 78 Denzel Okafor – (redshirt) junior (6'4, 310); 79 Matt Frost – (redshirt) freshman (6'4, 265); Defensive line: 32 Malcolm Roach – senior (6'3, 290); 36 Jacoby Jones – junior (6'4, 275); 42 Marquez Bimage – junior (6'2, 270); 43 Chris Hannon – (redshirt) freshman (6'3, 230); 45 Peter Mpagi – freshman (6'5, 260); 49 Ta’Quon Graham – junior (6'3, 300); 55 D’Andre Christmas-Giles – (redshirt) junior (6'3, 315); 88 Daniel Carson – (redshirt) freshman (6'4, 295); 90 Rob Cummins – (redshirt) sophomore (6'5, 260); 91 Jamari Chisholm – (redshirt) senior (6'5, 300); 92 Myron Warren – freshman (6'2, 270); 93 T'Vondre Sweat – freshman (6'4, 320); 94 Gerald Wilbon – senior (6'3, 325); 96 Tristan Bennett – (redshirt) junior (6'3, 240); 97 Patrick Bayouth – freshman (6'4, 260); 98 Moro Ojomo – (redshirt) freshman (6'3, 280); 99 Keondre Coburn – (redshirt) freshman (6'2, 340); Deep Snapper: 47 Chandler Kelehan – (redshirt) freshman (6'1, 200); 54 Justin Mader – sophomore (6'2, 235)	Linebacker: 1 DeGabriel Floyd – Freshman (6'2, 240); 6 Juwan Mitchell – sophomore (6'1, 240); 13 Marcus Tillman, Jr. – freshman (6'1, 235); 23 Jeffrey McCulloch – senior (6'3, 245); 30 Caleb Johnson – junior (6'0, 235); 33 David Gbenda – freshman (6'0, 220); 35 Russell Hine – (redshirt) sophomore (6'2, 210); 40 Ayodele Adeoye – (redshirt) freshman (6'1, 250); 46 Joseph Ossai – sophomore (6'4, 245); 47 Luke Brockermeyer – (redshirt) freshman (6'3, 220); 48 Jake Ehlinger – freshman (5'11, 225); 50 Byron Vaughns – (redshirt) freshman (6'4, 245); 52 Jett Bush – freshman (6'2, 230); 57 Cort Jaquess – (redshirt) sophomore (6'0, 240); Defensive back: 2 Kenyatta Watson II – freshman (6'1, 190); 3 Jalen Green – sophomore (6'1, 185); 4 Anthony Cook – sophomore (6'1, 190); 5 D'Shawn Jamison – sophomore (5'10, 190); 7 Caden Sterns – sophomore (6'1, 205); 11 Chris Adimora – freshman (6'1, 185); 15 Chris Brown – junior (5'11, 195); 17 Myles Mass – freshman (5'11, 195); 18 Tremayne Prudhomme – (redshirt) freshman (6'1, 190); 19 Brandon Jones – senior (6'0, 205); 21 Turner Symonds – (redshirt) freshman (6'1, 185); 24 Marques Caldwell – freshman (6'1, 195); 25 B.J. Foster – sophomore (6'2, 210); 26 Christian Tschauner – freshman (5'11, 190); 27 Donovan Duvernay – (redshirt) junior (5'9, 195); 28 Mason Ramirez – (redshirt) senior (5'10, 210); 29 Josh Thompson – junior (6'0, 200); 31 DeMarvion Overshown – sophomore (6'4, 210); 37 Doak Wilson – freshman (6'0, 190); 38 Kobe Boyce – sophomore (6'1, 180); 39 Montrell Estell – sophomore (6'1, 205); 41 Hank Coutoumanos – (redshirt) junior (6'0, 195); 44 Tyler Owens – freshman (6'2, 205); Legend: (C) Team captain; (S) Suspended; (I) Ineligible; Injured; Redshirt

== Game summaries ==
=== Louisiana Tech ===
Louisiana Tech Bulldogs at Texas Longhorns

Quarter	1	2	3	4	Total
Bulldogs	0	0	0	14	14
No. 10 Longhorns	7	17	14	7	45

at Darrell K Royal–Texas Memorial Stadium, Austin, Texas

- Date: August 31, 2019
- Game time: 7:00 p.m.
- Game weather: Temperature: 93 • Wind: S 3 mph • Weather: Partly cloudy
- Game attendance: 93,418
- Referee: Cooper Castleberry
- TV announcers (LHN): Lowell Galindo (play-by-play), Ahmad Brooks (analyst), Taylor Davis (sideline)
- Box Score

Game information

First Quarter

- (12:40) UT – Devin Duvernay 4 yard pass from Sam Ehlinger, Dicker kick
  UT 7–0; 7 plays, 57 yards, 2:20

Second Quarter

- (13:20) UT – Collin Johnson 6 yard pass from Ehlinger, Dicker kick
  UT 14–0; 11 plays, 74 yards, 3:32
- (10:26) UT – Brennan Eagles 28 yard pass from Ehlinger, Dicker kick
  UT 21–0; 2 plays, 37 yards, 0:34
- (2:56) UT – Cameron Dicker 43 yd Field Goal
  UT 24–0; 4 plays, 6 yards, 1:08

Third Quarter

- (9:06) UT – Brennan Eagles 25 yard pass from Ehlinger, Dicker kick
  UT 31–0; 9 plays, 74 yards, 2:46
- (2:44) UT – Keaontay Ingram 1 yard run, Dicker kick
  UT 38–0; 9 plays, 61 yards, 3:30

Fourth Quarter

- (13:31) LT – Malik Stanley 5 yard pass from J'Mar Smith, Hale kick
  UT 38–7; 9 plays, 75 yards, 4:13
- (7:54) LT – Griffin Gebert 12 yard pass from Smith, Hale kick
  UT 38–14; 12 plays, 70 yards, 3:52
- (1:09) UT – Casey Thompson 2 yard run, Dicker kick
  UT 45–14; 5 plays, 27 yards, 1:43

Passing

- LT – J'Mar Smith – 34–51, 331 yds, 2 TDs, 1 INT
- UT – Sam Ehlinger – 28–38, 376 yds, 4 TDs

Rushing

- LT – Jaqwis Dancy – 7 carries, 25 yds
- UT – Keaontay Ingram – 11 carries, 78 yds, 1 TD

Receiving

- LT – Smoke Harris – 6 receptions, 68 yards
- UT – Brennan Eagles – 3 receptions, 59 yards, 2 TDs

=== LSU ===
LSU Tigers at Texas Longhorns

Quarter	1	2	3	4	Total
No. 6 Tigers	3	17	3	22	45
No. 9 Longhorns	0	7	14	17	38

at Darrell K Royal–Texas Memorial Stadium, Austin, Texas

- Date: September 7, 2019
- Game time: 6:30 p.m.
- Game weather: Temperature: 100 • Wind: S 10–15 mph • Weather: Sunny
- Game attendance: 98,763
- Referee: John McDaid
- TV announcers (ABC): Rece Davis (play-by-play), Kirk Herbstreit (analyst), Maria Taylor (sideline)
- Box Score

Game information

First Quarter

- (8:04) LSU – Cade York 36 Yard Field Goal
  LSU 3–0; 11 plays, 71 yards, 4:58

Second Quarter

- (10:29) UT – Brennan Eagles 55 yard pass from Sam Ehlinger, Dicker kick
  UT 7–3; 8 plays, 78 yards, 2:21
- (7:30) LSU – Justin Jefferson 6 yard pass from Joe Burrow, York kick
  LSU 10–7; 8 plays, 75 yards, 2:59
- (1:41) LSU – Cade York 33 Yard Field Goal
  LSU 13–7; 10 plays, 65 yards, 2:54
- (0:47) LSU – Jefferson 21 yard pass from Burrow, York kick
  LSU 20–7; 3 plays, 58 yards, 0:26

Third Quarter

- (6:51) UT – Sam Ehlinger 2 yard run, Dicker kick
  LSU 20–14; 19 plays, 86 yards, 7:17
- (5:10) LSU – Cade York 40 Yard Field Goal
  LSU 23–14; 6 plays, 53 yards, 1:41
- (2:36) UT – Jake Smith 20 yard pass from Sam Ehlinger, Dicker kick
  LSU 23–21; 7 plays, 75 yards, 2:34

Fourth Quarter

- (14:52) LSU – Terrace Marshall Jr. 26 yard pass from Burrow, York kick
  LSU 30–21; 6 plays, 75 yards, 2:44
- (12:09) UT – Devin Duvernay 44 yard pass from Ehlinger, Dicker kick
  LSU 30–28; 7 plays, 75 yards, 2:43
- (9:58) LSU – Clyde Edwards-Helaire 12 yard run, York kick
  LSU 37–28; 6 plays, 75 yards, 2:11
- (3:59) UT – Cameron Dicker 47 Yard Field Goal
  LSU 37–31; 10 plays, 46 yards, 5:59
- (2:27) LSU – Jefferson 61 yard pass from Burrow, Burrow pass to Ja'Marr Chase for 2-Point Conversion
  LSU 45–31; 6 plays, 75 yards, 1:32
- (0:22) UT – Devin Duvernay 15 yard pass from Ehlinger, Dicker kick
  LSU 45–38; 8 plays, 75 yards, 2:05

Passing

- LSU – Joe Burrow – 31/39, 471 YDS, 4 TD, 1 INT
- UT – Sam Ehlinger – 31/47, 401 YDS, 4 TD

Rushing

- LSU – Clyde Edwards-Helaire – 15 ATT, 87 YDS, 1 TD
- UT – Sam Ehlinger – 19 ATT, 60 YDS, 1 TD

Receiving

- LSU – Justin Jefferson – 9 REC, 163 YDS, 3 TD
- UT – Devin Duvernay – 12 REC, 154 YDS, 2 TD

=== @ Rice ===
Texas Longhorns at Rice Owls

Quarter	1	2	3	4	Total
No. 12 Longhorns	14	17	7	10	48
Owls	0	0	0	13	13

at NRG Stadium, Houston, Texas

- Date: September 14, 2019
- Game time: 7:00 p.m.
- Game weather: Indoors
- Game attendance: 42,417
- Referee: Rodney Burnette
- TV announcers (CBS Sports Network): Carter Blackburn (play-by-play), Aaron Taylor (analyst), Jenny Dell (sideline)
- Box Score

Game information

First Quarter

- (8:46) UT – Roschon Johnson 25 yard pass from Sam Ehlinger, Cameron Dicker kick
  UT 7–0; 12 plays, 82 yards, 6:14
- (3:21) UT – Jake Smith 53 yard pass from Sam Ehlinger, Cameron Dicker kick
  UT 14–0; 7 plays, 90 yards, 3:13

Second Quarter

- (12:11) UT – Keaontay Ingram 26 yard run, Cameron Dicker kick
  UT 21–0; 10 plays, 73 yards, 4:29
- (6:33) UT – Jake Smith 12 yard pass from Sam Ehlinger, Cameron Dicker kick
  UT 28–0; 8 plays, 79 yards, 3:30
- (1:01) UT – Cameron Dicker 57 yard field goal
  UT 31–0; 4 plays, 2 yards, 0:54

Third Quarter

- (6:32) UT – Keaontay Ingram 14 yard run, Cameron Dicker kick
  UT 38–0; 11 plays, 91 yards, 4:48

Fourth Quarter

- (7:50) Rice – Aston Walter 3 yard pass from Tom Stewart, Will Harrison kick failed
  UT 38–6; 12 plays, 73 yards, 6:26
- (3:29) UT – Cameron Dicker 46 yard field goal
  UT 41–6; 7 plays, 40 yards, 4:21
- (1:07) Rice – Aston Walter 4 yard pass from Tom Stewart, Antonio Montero kick
  UT 41–13; 8 plays, 75 yards, 2:22
- (0:53) UT – D'Shawn Jamison 98 yard kickoff return, Cameron Dicker kick
  UT 48–13

Passing

- UT – Sam Ehlinger 23/27, 279 YDS, 3 TD
- Rice – Tom Stewart 12/23, 179 YDS, 2 TD

Rushing

- UT – Keaontay Ingram 13 ATT, 74 YDS, 2 TD
- Rice – Aston Walter 16 ATT, 69 YDS

Receiving

- UT – Jake Smith 6 REC, 75 YDS, 2 TD
- Rice – Austin Trammell 6 REC 97 YDS

=== Oklahoma State ===
Oklahoma State Cowboys at Texas Longhorns

Quarter	1	2	3	4	Total
Cowboys	3	17	3	7	30
No. 12 Longhorns	0	21	7	8	36

at Darrell K Royal–Texas Memorial Stadium, Austin, Texas

- Date: September 21, 2019
- Game time: 6:30 p.m.
- Game weather: Temperature: 92 • Wind: SE 15–20 mph • Humidity: 44% • Weather: Partly cloudy
- Game attendance: 96,936
- Referee: David Alvarez
- TV announcers (ABC): Chris Fowler (play-by-play), Kirk Herbstreit (analyst), Maria Taylor (sideline)
- Box Score

Game information

First Quarter

- (9:12) OSU – Matt Ammendola 20 yard field goal
  OSU 3–0; 13 plays, 76 yards, 5:48

Second Quarter

- (14:53) UT – Devin Duvernay 6 yard pass from Sam Ehlinger, Cameron Dicker kick
  UT 7–3; 9 plays, 66 yards, 3:46
- (12:42) UT – Jake Smith 17 yard pass from Sam Ehlinger, Cameron Dicker kick
  UT 14–3; 3 plays, 28 yards, 1:23
- (9:21) OSU – Matt Ammendola 43 yard field goal
  UT 14–6; 8 plays, 49 yards, 3:21
- (3:07) OSU – Spencer Sanders 7 yard run, Matt Ammendola kick
  UT 14–13; 6 plays, 70 yards, 2:17
- (2:09) UT – Brennan Eagles 73 yard pass from Sam Ehlinger, Cameron Dicker kick
  UT 21–13; 4 plays, 84 yards, 0:58
- (0:11) OSU – Chuba Hubbard 1 yard run, Matt Ammendola kick
  UT 21–20; 4 plays, 15 yards, 0:42

Third Quarter

- (8:02) OSU – Matt Ammendola 27 yard field goal
  OSU 23–21; 11 plays, 74 yards, 3:44
- (5:30) UT – Cade Brewer 25 yard pass from Sam Ehlinger, Cameron Dicker kick
  UT 28–23; 7 plays, 75 yards, 2:32

Fourth Quarter

- (11:44) UT – Roschon Johnson 2 yard run, Roschon Johnson pass
  UT 36–23; 6 plays, 73 yards, 2:19
- (1:37) OSU – Chuba Hubbard 13 yard run, Matt Ammendola kick
  UT 36–30; 7 plays, 46 yards, 2:07

Passing

- OSU – Spencer Sanders 19/32, 268 YDS, 2 INT
- UT – Sam Ehlinger 20/28, 281 YDS, 4 TD, 1 INT

Rushing

- OSU – Chuba Hubbard 37 ATT, 121 YDS, 2 TD
- UT – Keaontay Ingram 21 ATT, 114 YDS

Receiving

- OSU – Tylan Wallace 5 REC, 83 YDS
- UT – Devin Duvernay 12 REC, 108 YDS, 1 TD

=== @ West Virginia ===
Texas Longhorns at West Virginia Mountaineers

Quarter	1	2	3	4	Total
No. 11 Longhorns	7	14	0	21	42
Mountaineers	7	7	3	14	31

at Mountaineer Field, Morgantown, West Virginia

- Date: October 5, 2019
- Game time: 2:30 p.m.
- Game weather: Temperature: 73 • Wind: ESE 9 mph • Weather: Clear
- Game attendance: 62,069
- Referee: Brad Van Vark
- TV announcers (ABC): Steve Levy (play-by-play), Brian Griese (analyst), Todd McShay (analyst), Molly McGrath (sideline)
- Box Score

Game information

First Quarter

- (13:31) WVU – Sam James 44 yard pass from Austin Kendall, Evan Staley kick
  WVU 7–0; 4 plays, 76 yards, 1:29
- (5:52) UT – Malcolm Epps 22 yard pass from Sam Ehlinger, Cameron Dicker kick
  Tied 7–7; 2 plays, 27 yards, 0:34

Second Quarter

- (12:59) WVU – Austin Kendall 1 yard run, Evan Staley kick
  WVU 14–7; 5 plays, 60 yards, 1:13
- (7:56) UT – John Burt 13 yard pass from Sam Ehlinger, Cameron Dicker kick
  Tied 14–14; 11 plays, 69 yards, 4:59
- (3:28) UT – Sam Ehlinger 13 yard run, Cameron Dicker kick
  UT 21–14; 6 plays, 80 yards, 2:40

Third Quarter

- (1:59) WVU – Evan Staley 29 yard field goal
  UT 21–17; 4 plays, 2 yards, 1:12

Fourth Quarter

- (12:42) UT – Devin Duvernay 13 yard run, Cameron Dicker kick
  UT 28–17; 3 plays, 18 yards, 0:50
- (10:31) UT – Sam Cosmi 12 yard run, Cameron Dicker kick
  UT 35–17; 4 plays, 33 yards, 1:54
- (3:57) WVU – T.J. Simmons 19 yard pass from Austin Kendall, Evan Staley kick
  UT 35–24; 5 plays, 74 yards, 1:30
- (3:03) UT – Sam Ehlinger 23 yard run, Cameron Dicker kick
  UT 42–24; 4 plays, 47 yards, 0:53
- (0:48) WVU – Bryce Ford-Wheaton 12 yard pass from Austin Kendall, Evan Staley kick
  UT 42–31; 11 plays, 81 yards, 2:10

Passing

- UT – Sam Ehlinger 18/33, 211 YDS, 2 TD, 1 INT
- WVU – Austin Kendall 31/46, 367 YDS, 3 TD, 4 INT

Rushing

- UT – Roschon Johnson 21 ATT, 121 YDS
- WVU – Kennedy McKoy 6 ATT, 30 YDS

Receiving

- UT – Devin Duvernay 6 REC, 86 YDS
- WVU – T.J. Simmons 7 REC, 135 YDS, 1 TD

=== vs. Oklahoma ===
Oklahoma Sooners vs. Texas Longhorns

Quarter	1	2	3	4	Total
No. 6 Sooners	7	3	10	14	34
No. 11 Longhorns	0	3	14	10	27

at Cotton Bowl, Dallas, Texas

- Date: October 12, 2019
- Game time: 11:00 a.m.
- Game weather: Temperature: 57 • Wind: ENE 8 mph • Humidity: 32% • Weather: Clear skies
- Game attendance: 92,100
- Referee: Mike Defee
- TV announcers (FOX): Gus Johnson (Play by Play), Joel Klatt (analyst), Jenny Taft (sideline)
- Box Score

Game information

First Quarter

- (9:54) OU – CeeDee Lamb 1 yard pass from Jalen Hurts, Gabe Brkic kick
  OU 7–0; 10 plays, 66 yards, 5:06

Second Quarter

- (1:49) OU – Gabe Brkic 19 yard field goal
  OU 10–0; 8 plays, 53 yards, 2:28
- (0:00) UT – Cameron Dicker 49 yard field goal
  OU 10–3; 8 plays, 48 yards, 1:44

Third Quarter

- (8:48) UT – Roschon Johnson 4 yard run, Cameron Dicker kick
  Tied 10–10; 7 plays, 93 yards, 2:40
- (7:45) OU – CeeDee Lamb 51 yard pass from Jalen Hurts, Gabe Brkic kick
  OU 17–10; 3 plays, 75 yards, 1:03
- (4:44) OU – Gabe Brkic 34 yard field goal
  OU 20–10; 6 plays, 21 yards, 2:04
- (0:00) UT – Sam Ehlinger 2 yard run, Cameron Dicker kick
  OU 20–17; 5 plays, 60 yards, 1:30

Fourth Quarter

- (11:56) OU – CeeDee Lamb 27 yard pass from Jalen Hurts, Gabe Brkic kick
  OU 27–17; 6 plays, 75 yards, 3:04
- (6:53) UT – Cameron Dicker 32 yard field goal
  OU 27–20; 13 plays, 61 yards, 5:03
- (4:19) OU – Jalen Hurts 3 yard run, Gabe Brkic kick
  OU 34–20; 5 plays, 75 yards, 2:34
- (1:49) UT – Sam Ehlinger 4 yard run, Cameron Dicker kick
  OU 34–27; 10 plays, 75 yards, 2:30

Passing

- OU – Jalen Hurts 16/28, 235 YDS, 3 TD, 1 INT
- UT – Sam Ehlinger 26/38, 210 YDS

Rushing

- OU – Jalen Hurts 17 ATT, 131 YDS, 1 TD
- UT – Roschon Johnson 8 ATT, 95 YDS, 1 TD

Receiving

- OU – CeeDee Lamb 10 REC, 171 YDS, 3 TD
- UT – Collin Johnson 6 REC, 82 YDS

=== Kansas ===
Kansas Jayhawks at Texas Longhorns

Quarter	1	2	3	4	Total
Jayhawks	3	14	7	24	48
No. 15 Longhorns	14	7	3	26	50

at Darrell K Royal–Texas Memorial Stadium, Austin, Texas

- Date: October 19, 2019
- Game time: TBA
- Game weather: Temperature: 92 • Wind: S 5 mph • Humidity: 20% • Weather: Partly cloudy
- Game attendance: 97,137
- Referee: Eddy Shelton
- TV announcers (LHN): Lowell Galindo (play-by-play), Ahmad Brooks (analyst), Taylor Davis (sideline)
- Box Score

Game information

First Quarter

- (12:56) UT – Roschon Johnson 14 yard run, Cameron Dicker kick
  UT 7–0; 6 plays, 65 yards, 2:04
- (6:31) UT – Jake Smith 10 yard pass from Sam Ehlinger, Cameron Dicker kick
  UT 14–0; 10 plays, 72 yards, 3:25
- (4:01) KU – Liam Jones 23 yard field goal
  UT 14–3; 6 plays, 74 yards, 2:25

Second Quarter

- (13:24) KU – Pooka Williams 7 yard run, Liam Jones kick
  UT 14–10; 9 plays, 50 yards, 3:17
- (8:38) KU – Takulve Williams 7 yard pass from Carter Stanley, Liam Jones kick
  KU 17–14; 4 plays, 60 yards, 1:47
- (2:19) UT – Brennan Eagles 5 yard pass from Sam Ehlinger, Cameron Dicker kick
  UT 21–17; 10 plays, 84 yards, 2:51

Third Quarter

- (9:48) KU – Stephon Robinson Jr. 9 yard pass from Carter Stanley, Liam Jones kick
  KU 24–21; 14 plays, 75 yards, 5:12
- (6:59) UT – Cameron Dicker 39 yard field goal
  Tied 24–24; 9 plays, 54 yards, 2:49

Fourth Quarter

- (14:01) UT – Devin Duvernay 14 yard pass from Sam Ehlinger, Cameron Dicker kick
  UT 31–24; 12 plays, 79 yards, 4:41
- (10:06) KU – Pooka Williams 16 yard run, Liam Jones kick blocked
  UT 31–30; 1 plays, 16 yards, 0:08
- (10:06) UT – D'Shawn Jamison 98 yard PAT return
  UT 33–30
- (8:32) UT – Devin Duvernay 43 yard pass from Sam Ehlinger, Cameron Dicker kick
  UT 40–30; 4 plays, 65 yards, 1:34
- (6:56) KU – Liam Jones 46 yard field goal
  UT 40–33; 7 plays, 47 yards, 1:29
- (4:25) KU – Andrew Parchment 11 yard pass from Carter Stanley, Liam Jones kick
  Tied 40–40; 6 plays, 36 yards, 1:54
- (2:47) UT – Keaontay Ingram 3 yard run, Cameron Dicker kick
  UT 47–40; 5 plays, 65 yards, 1:38
- (1:11) KU – Stephon Robinson Jr. 22 yard pass from Carter Stanley, Daylon Charlot pass
  KU 48–47; 8 plays, 75 yards, 1:36
- (0:00) UT – Cameron Dicker 33 yard field goal
  UT 50–48; 10 plays, 60 yards, 1:11

Passing

- KU – Carter Stanley 27/47, 310 YDS, 4 TD
- UT – Sam Ehlinger 31/44, 399 YDS, 4 TD, 1 INT

Rushing

- KU – Pooka Williams Jr. 25 ATT, 190 YDS, 2 TD
- UT – Keaontay Ingram 14 ATT, 101 YDS, 1 TD

Receiving

- KU – Andrew Parchment 3 REC, 83 YDS, 1 TD
- UT – Devin Duvernay 8 REC, 110 YDS, 2 TD

The underdog Kansas Jayhawks stayed with the #15 Texas Longhorns for four quarters of play. In the last minutes, Carter Stanley was successful with a 22-yard scoring pass to Stephon Robinson. The following 2-point conversion throw to Daylon Charlot put the Jayhawks ahead by one point. With 1:11 left to play, Texas took over and put together an offensive drive that ended with a game-winning field goal for the Longhorns.

Even with the loss, several of the Kansas players gave great performances: Pooka Williams rushed for 190 yards and two touchdowns; quarterback Carter Stanley threw 310 yards and four touchdowns for the Jayhawks. For the Longhorns, Sam Ehlinger rushed for 91 yards and managed 399 yards passing with four touchdowns. When everything was complete, Texas won by a score of 50–48.

=== @ TCU ===
Texas Longhorns at TCU Horned Frogs

Quarter	1	2	3	4	Total
No. 15 Longhorns	3	14	3	7	27
Horned Frogs	3	10	14	10	37

at Amon G. Carter Stadium, Fort Worth, Texas

- Date: October 26, 2019
- Game time: 2:30 p.m.
- Game attendance: 47,660
- TV announcers (FOX): Joe Davis (play-by-play), Brock Huard (analyst), Bruce Feldman (sideline)

Game information

First Quarter

- UT – Cameron Dicker 21 Yd Field Goal, 6:32. UT 3–0. Drive: 12 plays, 80 yards, 4:58.
- TCU – Jonathan Song 32 Yd Field Goal, 2:25. Tied 3–3. Drive: 4 plays, 6 yards, 1:18.

Second Quarter

- TCU — Pro Wells 24 Yd pass from Max Duggan (Jonathan Song Kick), 12:18. TCU 10–3. Drive: 9 plays, 63 yards, 4:27.
- UT – Devin Duvernay 47 Yd pass from Sam Ehlinger (Cameron Dicker Kick), 10:57. Tied 10–10. Drive: 4 plays, 75 yards, 1:21.
- UT – Keaontay Ingram 17 Yd pass from Sam Ehlinger (Cameron Dicker Kick), 1:11. UT 17–10. Drive: 8 plays, 83 yards, 2:11.
- TCU – Griffin Kell 52 Yd Field Goal, 0:00. UT 17–13. Drive: 8 plays, 60 yards, 1:11.

Third Quarter

- UT – Cameron Dicker 38 Yd Field Goal, 7:46. UT 20–13. Drive: 7 plays, 52 yards, 2:04.
- TCU – Sewo Olonilua 1 Yd Run (Jonathan Song Kick), 5:30. Tied 20–20. Drive: 5 plays, 70 yards, 2:16.
- TCU – Jalen Reagor 44 Yd pass from Max Duggan (Jonathan Song Kick), 4:17. TCU 27–20. Drive: 1 play, 44 yards, 0:08.

Fourth Quarter

- TCU – Jonathan Song 33 Yd Field Goal, 11:28. TCU 30–20. Drive: 6 plays, 20 yards, 3:32.
- UT – Roschon Johnson 2 Yd Run (Cameron Dicker Kick), 6:50. TCU 30–27. Drive: 12 plays, 75 yards, 4:38.
- TCU – Max Duggan 11 Yd Run (Jonathan Song Kick), 1:59. TCU 37–27. Drive: 9 plays, 75 yards, 4:51.

Passing

- UT – Sam Ehlinger – 22-48, 321 YDS, 2 TD, 4 INT
- TCU – Max Duggan – 19-27, 273 YDS, 2 TD, 1 INT

Rushing

- UT – Keaontay Ingram – 16 CAR, 71 YDS
- TCU – Max Duggan – 13 CAR, 72 YDS, 1 TD

Receiving

- UT – Devin Duvernay – 8 REC, 173 YDS, 1 TD
- TCU – Taye Barber – 5 REC, 94 YDS

=== Kansas State ===
Kansas State Wildcats at Texas Longhorns

Quarter	1	2	3	4	Total
No. 20 Wildcats	14	0	0	10	24
Longhorns	0	7	10	10	27

at Darrell K Royal–Texas Memorial Stadium, Austin, Texas

- Date: November 9, 2019
- Game time: 2:30 pm
- Game attendance: 97,833
- TV: ESPN

Game information

First Quarter

- KSU – Malik Knowles 70 Yd pass from Skylar Thompson (Blake Lynch Kick), 13:26. KSU 7–0. Drive: 3 plays, 75 yards, 1:34.
- KSU – Wykeen Gill 19 Yd pass from Skylar Thompson (Blake Lynch Kick), 5:18. KSU 14–0. Drive: 8 plays, 63 yards, 4:17.

Second Quarter

- UT – Collin Johnson 21 Yd pass from Sam Ehlinger (Cameron Dicker Kick), 12:03. KSU 14–7. Drive: 8 plays, 80 yards, 3:52.

Third Quarter

- UT – Keaontay Ingram 34 Yd Run (Cameron Dicker Kick), 13:17. Tied 14–14. Drive: 4 plays, 75 yards, 1:43.
- UT – Cameron Dicker 36 Yd Field Goal, 9:02. UT 17–14. Drive: 7 plays, 52 yards, 2:33.

Fourth Quarter

- UT – Keaontay Ingram 12 Yd Run (Cameron Dicker Kick), 12:17. UT 24–14. Drive: 3 plays, 21 yards, 1:03.
- KSU – Joshua Youngblood 98 Yd Kickoff Return (Blake Lynch Kick), 12:03. UT 24–21. Drive: 0 plays, 0 yards, 0:14.
- KSU – Blake Lynch 45 Yd Field Goal, 6:45. Tied 24–24. Drive: 9 plays, 45 yards, 3:58.
- UT – Cameron Dicker 26 Yd Field Goal, 0:00. UT 27–24. Drive: 13 plays, 67 yards, 6:45.

Passing

- KSU – Skylar Thompson – 17-27, 253 YDS, 2 TD
- UT – Sam Ehlinger – 22-29, 263 YDS, 1 TD, 1 INT

Rushing

- KSU – Tyler Burns – 8 CAR, 26 YDS
- UT – Keontay Ingram – 16 CAR, 139 YDS, 2 TD

Receiving

- KSU – Malik Knowles – 3 REC, 94 YDS, 1 TD
- UT – Collin Johnson – 7 REC, 110 YDS, 1 TD

In the days leading up to the Kansas State-Texas game, Texas football quarterback Sam Ehlinger was named a semifinalist for the 2019 Wuerffel Trophy. On that same day, the College Football Playoff committee ranked Kansas State at #16 in the first playoff ranking of the season. This was measurably higher than the #20 in the AP Poll and #22 in the USA Today Poll.

The game started with Kansas State taking a 14-point lead in the first quarter and allowed Texas to score a touchdown, making it 14–7 at halftime. Texas took the lead in the third quarter with ten more points to put it at 14–17. Each team added 10 more points in the fourth quarter to make the final score a Texas win 27–24, punctuated with a 26 yard game-winning field goal by the Longhorns' Cameron Dicker just as the clock ran out.

=== @ Iowa State ===
Texas Longhorns at Iowa State Cyclones

Quarter	1	2	3	4	Total
No. 19 Longhorns	0	7	0	14	21
Cyclones	7	3	10	3	23

at Jack Trice Stadium, Ames, Iowa

- Date: November 16, 2019
- Game time: 2:30 pm
- Game attendance: 58,946
- TV: FS1

Game information

First Quarter

- ISU – Charlie Kolar 2 Yd pass from Brock Purdy (Connor Assalley Kick), 10:44. Iowa State 7–0. Drive: 8 plays, 59 yards, 3:01.

Second Quarter

- ISU – Connor Assalley 35 Yd Field Goal, 0:47. Iowa State 10–0. Drive: 15 plays, 67 yards, 4:41.
- UT – Brennan Eagles 14 Yd pass from Sam Ehlinger (Cameron Dicker Kick), 0:17. Iowa State 10–7. Drive: 5 plays, 75 yards, 0:30.

Third Quarter

- ISU – Deshaunte Jones 75 Yd pass from Brock Purdy (Connor Assalley Kick), 14:46. Iowa State 17–7. Drive: 1 play, 75 yards, 0:14.
- ISU – Brayden Narveson 48 Yd Field Goal, 12:09. Iowa State 20–7. Drive: 7 plays, 35 yards, 2:17.

Fourth Quarter

- UT – Keaontay Ingram 22 Yd pass from Sam Ehlinger (Cameron Dicker Kick), 14:50. Iowa State 20–14. Drive: 10 plays, 80 yards, 2:50.
- UT – Malcolm Epps 7 Yd pass from Sam Ehlinger (Cameron Dicker Kick), 5:37. Texas 21–20. Drive: 15 plays, 89 yards, 6:43.
- ISU – Connor Assalley 36 Yd Field Goal, 0:00. Iowa State 23–21. Drive: 9 plays, 63 yards, 3:00.

Passing

- UT – Sam Ehlinger – 22-40, 273 YDS, 3 TD
- ISU – Brock Purdy – 30-48, 354 YDS, 2 TD, 1 INT

Rushing

- UT – Sam Ehlinger – 12 CAR, 27 YDS
- ISU – Breece Hall – 24 CAR, 101 YDS

Receiving

- UT – Devin Duvernay – 9 REC, 107 YDS
- ISU – Deshaunte Jones – 7 REC, 144 YDS, 1 TD

=== @ Baylor ===
Texas Longhorns at Baylor Bears

Quarter	1	2	3	4	Total
Longhorns	0	3	0	7	10
No. 14 Bears	0	7	14	3	24

at McLane Stadium, Waco, Texas

- Date: November 23, 2019
- Game time: 2:30 pm
- Game attendance: 49,109
- TV: FS1

Game information

First Quarter

- No scoring plays.

Second Quarter

- BU – John Lovett 28 Yd Run (John Mayers Kick), 14:51. Baylor 7–0. Drive: 7 plays, 50 yards, 2:51.
- UT – Cameron Dicker 48 Yd Field Goal, 0:00. Baylor 7–3. Drive: 2 plays, 68 yards, 0:18.

Third Quarter

- BU – Charlie Brewer 1 Yd Run (John Mayers Kick), 7:36. Baylor 14–3. Drive: 9 plays, 87 yards, 4:33.
- BU – Denzel Mims 12 Yd pass from Charlie Brewer (John Mayers Kick), 1:20. Baylor 21–3. Drive: 9 plays, 61 yards, 4:19.

Fourth Quarter

- BU – John Mayers 24 Yd Field Goal, 10:57. Baylor 24–3. Drive: 8 plays, 59 yards, 3:43.
- UT – Daniel Young 4 Yd Run (Cameron Dicker Kick), 0:01. Baylor 24–10. Drive: 5 plays, 55 yards, 0:42.

Passing

- UT – Sam Ehlinger – 22-37, 200 YDS, 1 INT
- BU – Charlie Brewer – 16-25, 221 YDS, 1 TD

Rushing

- UT – Keaontay Ingram – 7 CAR, 86 YDS
- BU – Charlie Brewer – 18 CAR, 75 YDS, 1 TD

Receiving

- UT – Devin Duvernay – 10 REC, 78 YDS
- BU – Denzel Mims – 7 REC, 125 YDS, 1 TD

=== Texas Tech ===
Texas Tech Red Raiders at Texas Longhorns

Quarter	1	2	3	4	Total
Red Raiders	14	7	3	0	24
Longhorns	6	22	14	7	49

at Darrell K Royal–Texas Memorial Stadium, Austin, Texas

- Date: November 29, 2019
- Game time: 11:00 a.m.
- TV announcers (Fox): Joe Davis (play-by-play), Brock Huard (color), Bruce Feldman (sideline)

Game information

First Quarter

- (9:10) TTU – KeSean Carter 13 yard pass from Jett Duffey, Trey Wolff kick
  Texas Tech 7–0; 11 plays, 80 yards, 2:09
- (4:14) TTU – SaRodorick Thompson 10 yard rush, Trey Wolff kick
  Texas Tech 14–0; 6 plays, 76 yards, 2:39
- (0:54) UT – Sam Ehlinger 10 yard rush, kick blocked
  Texas Tech 14–6; 6 plays, 75 yards, 3:20

Second Quarter

- (13:09) UT – Daniel Young 3 yard rush, 2-pt. rush good
  Tied 14–14; 5 plays, 64 yards, 1:38
- (8:13) TTU – Erik Ezukanma 24 yard pass from Jett Duffey, Trey Wolff kick
  Texas Tech 21–14; 2 plays, 24 yards, 0:23
- (8:02) UT – Devin Duvernay 75 yard pass from Sam Ehlinger, Cameron Dicker kick
  Tied 21–21; 1 play, 75 yards, 0:11
- (1:22) UT – Roschon Johnson 1 yard rush, Cameron Dicker kick
  Texas 28–21; 13 plays, 74 yards, 5:36

Third Quarter

- (8:52) UT – Jake Smith 26 yard pass from Sam Ehlinger, Cameron Dicker kick
  Texas 35–21; 7 plays, 82 yards, 1:56
- (6:09) TTU – Trey Wolff 23 yard field goal
  Texas 35–24; 12 plays, 70 yards, 2:43
- (2:35) UT – Roschon Johnson 1 yard rush, Cameron Dicker kick
  Texas 42–24; 9 plays, 74 yards, 3:34

Fourth Quarter

- (8:50) UT – Roschon Johnson 1 yard rush, Cameron Dicker kick
  Texas 49–24; 5 plays, 24 yards, 1:11

Passing

- TTU –
- UT –

Rushing

- TTU –
- UT –

Receiving

- TTU –
- UT –

=== vs. Utah (Alamo Bowl) ===
Texas Longhorns vs. Utah Utes (Alamo Bowl)

Quarter	1	2	3	4	Total
Longhorns	3	7	14	14	38
No. 11 Utes	0	0	3	7	10

at Alamodome, San Antonio, TX

- Date: December 31, 2019
- Game time: 6:30 p.m. (CST)
- Game weather: Indoors
- Game attendance: 60,147
- Referee: John McDaid
- TV announcers (ESPN): Dave Flemming (play-by-play), Louis Riddick (analyst), Paul Carcaterra (sideline)

Game information

First Quarter

- (10:26) UT – Cameron Dicker 29 yard field goal (Drive: 10 plays, 63 yards, 4:34; Texas 3–0)

Second Quarter

- (13:24) UT – Collin Johnson 5 yard pass from Sam Ehlinger, Cameron Dicker kick (Drive: 2 plays, 6 yards, 0:43; Texas 10–0)

Third Quarter

- (10:30) UT – Keaontay Ingram 11 yard pass from Sam Ehlinger, Cameron Dicker kick (Drive: 3 plays, 43 yards, 1:04; Texas 17–0)
- (4:58) UTAH – Jadon Redding 32 yard field goal (Drive: 11 plays, 60 yards, 5:32; Texas 17–3)
- (0:06) UT – Sam Ehlinger 6 yard rush, Cameron Dicker kick (Drive: 7 plays, 75 yards, 4:52; Texas 24–3)

Fourth Quarter

- (11:34) UTAH – Demari Simpkins 4 yard pass from Tyler Huntley, Jadon Redding kick (Drive: 9 plays, 75 yards, 3:32; Texas 24–10)
- (8:58) UT – Devin Duvernay 15 yard pass from Sam Ehlinger, Cameron Dicker kick (Drive: 7 plays, 75 yards, 2:36; Texas 31–10)
- (7:54) UT – Keaontay Ingram 49 yard rush, Cameron Dicker kick (Drive: 1 play, 49 yards, 0:13; Texas 38–10)

Passing

- UT – Sam Ehlinger – 12/18, 201 yards, 3 TD, 1 INT
- UTAH – Tyler Huntley – 15/23, 126 yards, 1 TD

Rushing

- UT – Keaontay Ingram – 13 carries, 108 yards, 1 TD
- UTAH – Zack Moss – 16 carries, 57 yards

Receiving

- UT – Devin Duvernay – 3 receptions, 92 yards, 1 TD
- UTAH – Brant Kuithe, Cole Fotheringham (Note: Both Kuithe and Fotheringham finished with the same number of receptions and receiving yards, meaning Utah finished with two leading receivers.) – 3 receptions, 30 yards

== Rankings ==
Ranking movements Legend: ██ Increase in ranking ██ Decrease in ranking — = Not ranked RV = Received votes
	Week																
Poll	Pre	1	2	3	4	5	6	7	8	9	10	11	12	13	14	15	Final
AP	10	9	12	12	11	11	11	15	15	RV	RV	22	RV	—	—	—	25
Coaches	10	9	13	13	12	12	11	15	15	24	RV	23	—	—	—	—	RV
CFP	Not released										—	19	—	—	—	—	Not released

== Players drafted into the NFL ==
Texas had three players selected in the 2020 NFL draft.

Round	Pick	Player	Position	NFL Club
3	70	Brandon Jones	S	Miami Dolphins
3	92	Devin Duvernay	WR	Baltimore Ravens
5	165	Collin Johnson	WR	Jacksonville Jaguars
