= Kiki DeAyala =

American football player (born 1961)

No. 31, 93
- Positions: Linebacker, defensive end

Personal information
- Born: October 23, 1961 (age 65); Miami, Florida, U.S.
- Listed height: 6 ft 1 in (1.85 m)
- Listed weight: 225 lb (102 kg)

Career information
- College: Texas
- NFL draft: 1983: 6th round, 152nd overall pick

Career history
- Houston Gamblers (1984-1985); Cincinnati Bengals (1986–1987)

Awards and highlights
- All-USFL Team (1984, 1985); SWC defensive lineman of the year (1982); First-team All-SWC (1982); 1982 Cotton Bowl champion

Career NFL statistics
- Sacks: 1
- Fumble recoveries: 2
- Stats at Pro Football Reference

Julian Luis "Kiki" DeAyala (born October 23, 1961) is an American former professional football player who was a linebacker in the United States Football League (USFL) and the National Football League (NFL). He played college football for the Texas Longhorns and where he holds several school records, including for career sacks with 40.5.

== Early life ==
DeAyala was born in Miami to Cuban-American immigrants. His father had participated in the Bay of Pigs invasion months before Kiki was born and was not able to return to the United States, after evading capture in the Swiss embassy, until Kiki was 6 months old.

DeAyala's family moved to Houston and he became a star athlete in high school who made All-District in both football and baseball and played tennis at Memorial High School in Houston. He was also a pre-teen swimming champion in Dallas and the Rio de Janeiro Tennis champion as a youth.

== College career ==
DeAyala played defensive end at the University of Texas at Austin from 1980 to 1982. In his sophomore season the Longhorns had a 7–5 season and played in, but lost, the 1980 Astro-Bluebonnet Bowl. In his junior year the Longhorns spent a week ranked #1 and came in 2nd in the Southwest Conference, but because SMU was banned from post-season play, they played in the 1982 Cotton Bowl Classic where they upset Alabama and finished the season ranked #2. DeAayala had the 7th most sacks in a season in Texas history that year, set the school record for most quarterback pressures in a season and was named 2nd team all-conference in 1981. In 1982, the Longhorns again came in 2nd in the conference, lost the 1982 Sun Bowl and finished ranked #17.

In 1982 DeAyala was a team captain, on the all-conference team, named the SWC defensive lineman of the year and was a 3rd Team All-American. He set the school records for career and single-season sacks (22.5); career (60) and single season tackles for a loss (33), and career (117) and single season (56) quarterback pressures. He also had the 2nd most forced fumbles in a season in school history. His career record for tackles for a loss was later surpassed by Derrick Johnson.

After his senior year, he played in the 1983 East-West Shrine Bowl.

== Professional career ==
He was selected by the Cincinnati Bengals in the sixth round of the 1983 NFL draft and by the Washington Federals in the 11th Round of the 1983 USFL Draft. During the 1983 season, the Federals traded the rights to DeAyala to the Gamblers for an undisclosed draft pick.

He sat out both the USFL and NFL 1983 seasons and went to play for the USFL's Houston Gamblers in 1984 for more money than he was offered in the NFL and a chance to return to playing linebacker, which he'd played in high school. He played two seasons for the Gamblers, which won their Division in 1984 and made the playoffs both seasons; and he made the All-USFL team in 1984 and 1985.

When the USFL folded, DeAyala went to the Bengals for two seasons where he saw limited playing time. He retired after the 1987 season for health reasons, having had three shoulder operations and four knee operations.

In 2004, he was inducted into the Laredo Latin American International Sports Hall of Fame.

== Personal ==
DeAyala went into commercial real estate as CEO of Arena Ventures, and later owned a real estate development company in Houston/Rockport, Texas, DeAyala Properties.
