= Roy Williams (wide receiver) =

American football player (born 1981)

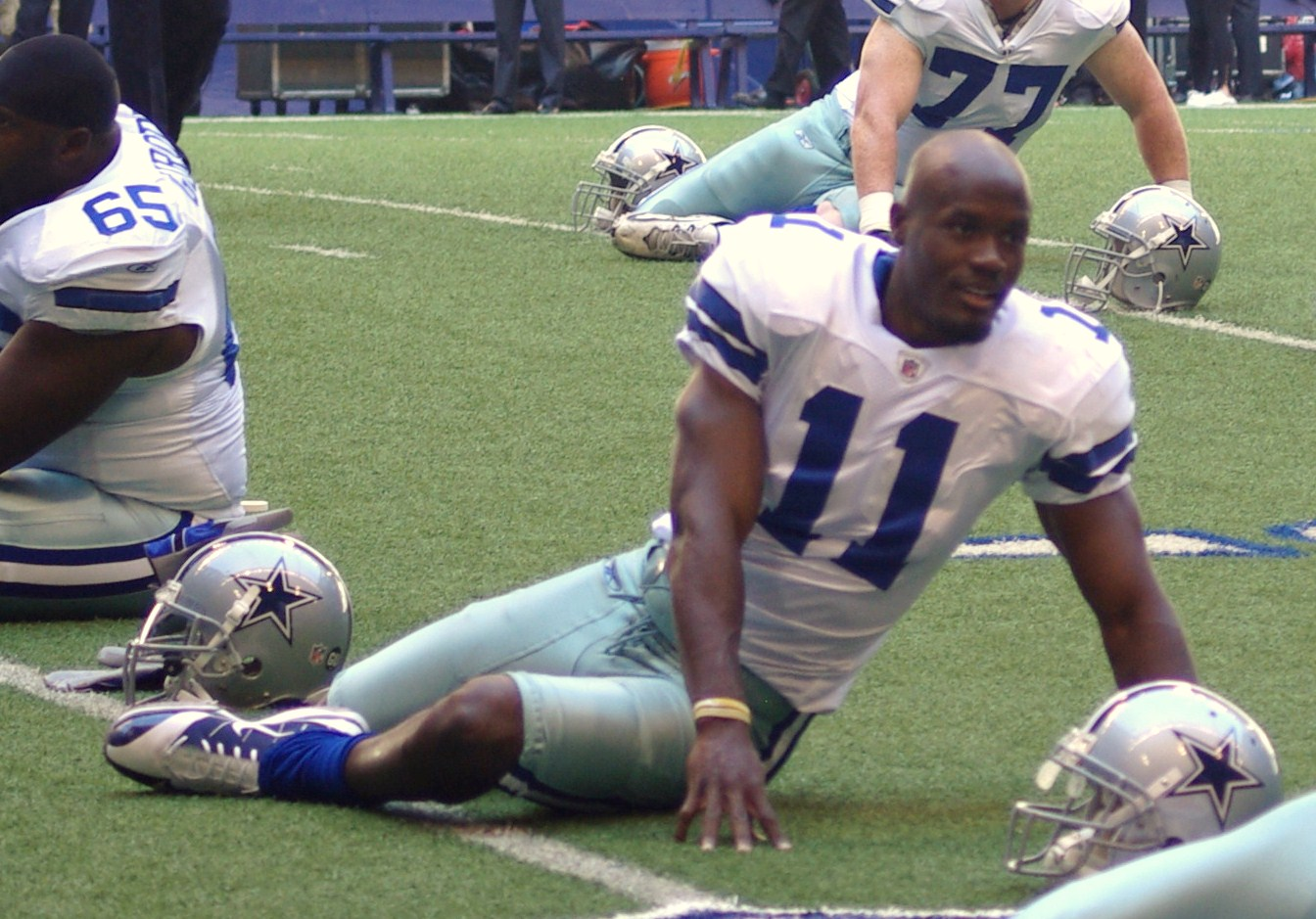
- Williams with the Dallas Cowboys in 2008

No. 11
- Position: Wide receiver

Personal information
- Born: December 21, 1981 (age 44); Odessa, Texas, U.S.
- Listed height: 6 ft 3 in (1.91 m)
- Listed weight: 215 lb (98 kg)

Career information
- High school: Permian (Odessa)
- College: Texas (2000–2003)
- NFL draft: 2004: 1st round, 7th overall pick

Career history
- Detroit Lions (2004–2008); Dallas Cowboys (2008–2010); Chicago Bears (2011)

Awards and highlights
- Pro Bowl (2006); PFWA All-Rookie Team (2004); Cotton Bowl Classic MVP (2003); Second-team All-American (2003); Second-team All-Big 12 (2003); 2× First-team All-Big 12 (2001, 2002); Big 12 Offensive Freshman of the Year (2000)

Career NFL statistics
- Receptions: 393
- Receiving yards: 5,715
- Receiving touchdowns: 44
- Stats at Pro Football Reference

Roy Eugene Williams Jr. (born December 21, 1981) is an American former professional football player who spent his career as a wide receiver in the National Football League (NFL) for the Detroit Lions, Dallas Cowboys, and Chicago Bears. He played college football for the Texas Longhorns, earning second-team All-American honors in 2003.

== Early life ==
Roy Williams was adopted at age six by two caucasian parents, Roy has repeatedly expressed how difficult it was growing up in Texas as a member of a biracial family. However, Roy claims that teasing only made him practice harder to prove himself to his peers. Williams attended high school at Permian High School in Odessa, Texas, where he starred in multiple sports. He lettered in football, track, baseball, and basketball, earning all-state honors in football and track and all-district accolades in baseball and basketball.

Williams was an academic scholar, making the honor roll all four years while attending Permian High School.

== College career ==
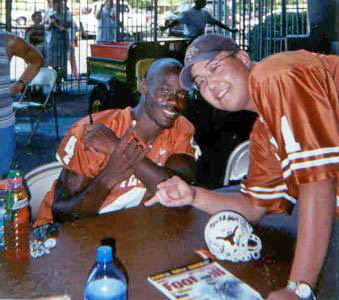
Williams in 2002

Arriving at the University of Texas in the 2000 recruiting class, Williams and fellow freshmen receivers B.J. Johnson and Sloan Thomas were touted as the most talented group of incoming receivers in school history.

In his second season, he started 13 games, making 67 receptions for 836 yards and 7 touchdowns. As a junior, he was limited with a hamstring injury, appearing in 12 games with nine starts, while posting 64 receptions for 1,142 yards and 12 touchdowns. Instead of opting for the NFL, he decided to return for his senior season, registering 70 receptions for 1,079 yards and 9 touchdowns.

By the end of his college career, Williams had become one of the most decorated receivers in Texas Longhorns history. Nicknamed "The Legend", he left school as the all-time leader in receptions, receiving yards, and receiving touchdowns. He was a member of the All-Conference Team for the Big 12 on three occasions, and was a semi-finalist for the Biletnikoff Award during both his junior and senior seasons.

In 2013, he was inducted into the University of Texas Hall of Honor.

=== Track and field ===
Williams was active on the track club at the University of Texas, where he recorded a personal best of 10.30 seconds in the 100 meters. He also specialized in high jump and long jump.

Personal bests

Event	Time (seconds)	Venue	Date
100 meters	10.30	Lubbock, Texas	April 29, 2000

Event	Mark (meters)	Venue	Date
High jump	2.08	Lubbock, Texas	April 29, 2000
Long jump	7.77	Austin, Texas	May 13, 2000

== Professional career ==
Pre-draft measurables
Height	Weight	Arm length	Hand span	40-yard dash	20-yard shuttle	Three-cone drill	Vertical jump	Broad jump	Wonderlic
6 ft 2 1/2 in (1.89 m)	212 lb (96 kg)	33 7/8 in (0.86 m)	9 1/8 in (0.23 m)	4.37 s	3.97 s	6.75 s	39.5 in (1.00 m)	11 ft 0 in (3.35 m)	17
All values from NFL Combine

=== Detroit Lions ===
Williams was selected seventh overall in the first round of the 2004 NFL draft by the Detroit Lions. Many draft experts considered the pick a bold move since the Lions had drafted Charles Rogers with the second overall pick the year before.

In 2004, Williams set Lions rookie records with 54 receptions for 817 yards and eight touchdowns in 12 games; he suffered an ankle injury midway through the season that limited his effectiveness. He was named to the PFWA All-Rookie Team.

The following season, the team spent their first-round draft pick (10th overall) on yet another receiver, this time USC star Mike Williams (no relation). He (Roy) finished first on the team in receiving yards (687), average per catch (15.3) and second in receptions (45).

Roy Williams had a productive year for the 2006 Lions, with 1,310 yards, seven touchdowns and a 16.0 yards-per-catch average. The 1,310 yards were the most in the NFC, and tied with Indianapolis Colts receiver Reggie Wayne for third-most in the NFL. Williams' 16.0 YPC average was first in the NFL for receivers with more than 25 receptions. He also had 24 catches of 20-plus yards, which ranked first in the NFL. He and teammate Mike Furrey caught more passes (178) than any other duo in the NFC. Williams was named an alternate for the 2007 Pro Bowl. When Torry Holt withdrew due to injury, Williams was named to the active squad. He was the first Detroit wide receiver to make the Pro Bowl since 1998 (Herman Moore). Williams was the 2007 recipient of the Detroit Lions/Detroit Sports Broadcasters Association/Pro Football Writers Association's Media-Friendly "Good Guy" Award. The Good Guy Award is given yearly to the Detroit Lions player who shows consideration to, and cooperation with the media at all times during the course of the season.

Roy Williams also coined teammate and fellow wide receiver Calvin Johnson's iconic "Megatron" Nickname.

=== Dallas Cowboys ===
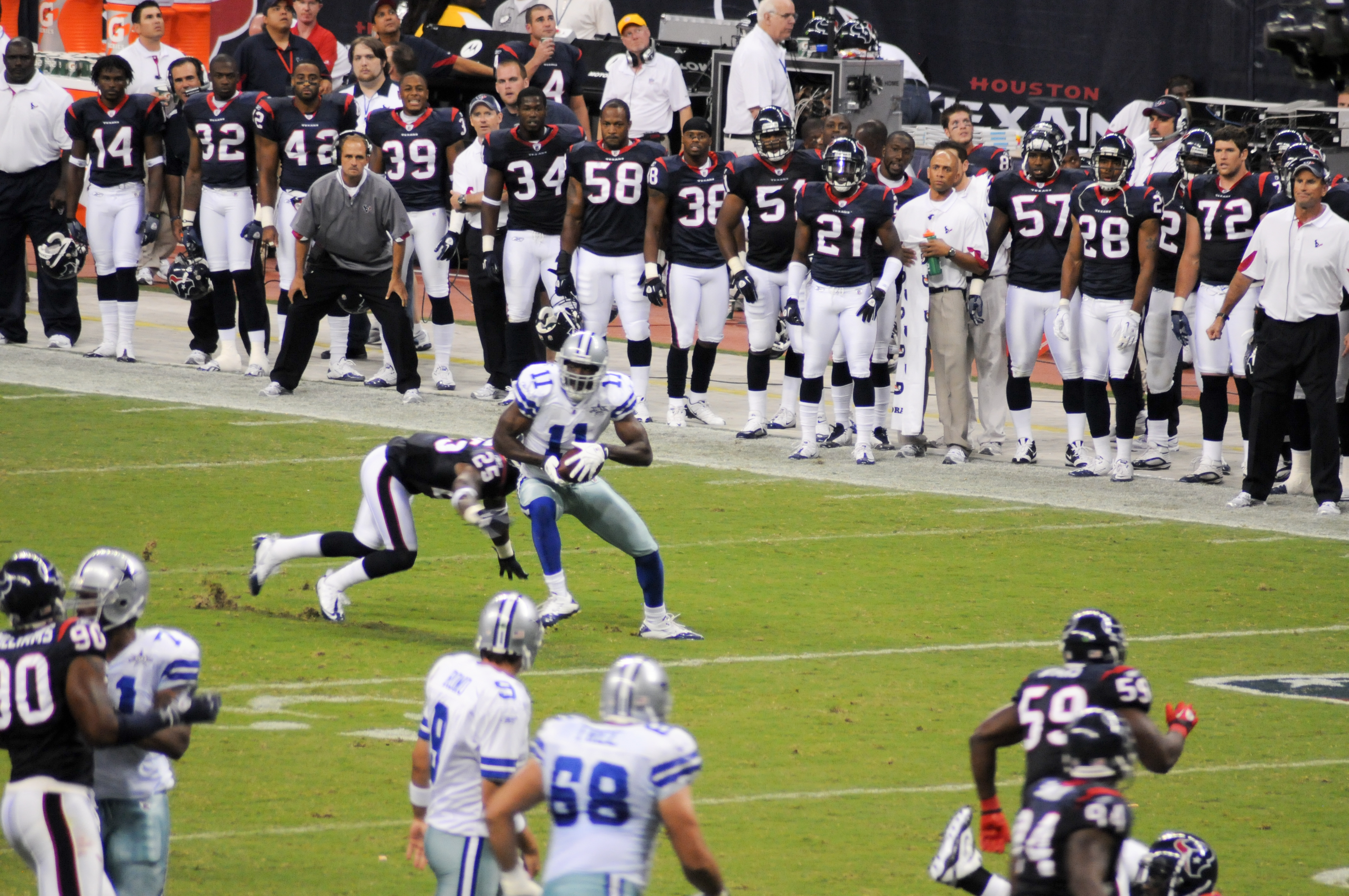
Williams catching a pass in 2010

The Dallas Cowboys were interested in obtaining Williams for at least two years, finally reaching a trade agreement with the Lions on October 14, 2008, in exchange for a first (#20-Brandon Pettigrew), third (#82-Derrick Williams), and sixth-round (#192-Aaron Brown) picks in the 2009 NFL draft (the Cowboys also received a seventh-round pick (#210-Vance Walker) from the Lions in the 2010 draft). He was signed to a new contract through the 2014 season; he agreed to a six-year, $54 million contract, with $26 million guaranteed. Williams became the second option at wide receiver, while playing opposite to Terrell Owens and didn't have the immediate impact expected, catching only 19 passes and one touchdown in seven starts, although his problems were attributed to his unfamiliarity with the offensive system, playing with two different quarterbacks and the lingering effects of a Lisfranc injury.

In 2009, with the release of Owens, Williams was expected to take over as the team's leading wide receiver, but against the Kansas City Chiefs, as a replacement for Williams, Miles Austin had a breakout game with 10 receptions for 250 yards (a Cowboys record for receiving yards in a single-game, breaking Bob Hayes' 246-yard effort in 1966) and 2 touchdowns. Williams would be again relegated to the second wide receiver role for the rest of the season, although he helped the Cowboys win their first playoff game since 1996, by making five catches for 59 yards including several crucial third-down catches in the first half.

In 2010, the Cowboys drafted future Pro Bowler Dez Bryant in the first round, but Williams retained his starting role alongside Austin. He got off to a quick start with 21 receptions for 306 yards and 5 touchdowns in the first 5 games, but his production declined significantly in his final 10 games (16 catches for 224 yards and no touchdowns) as Bryant gained a bigger role in the offense. His best game with the Cowboys was against in-state rival Houston Texans, in which he recorded 117 receiving yards and two touchdowns on five catches while only being targeted six times.

His time with Cowboys was a disappointment, by the close of the 2010 season, Williams had totaled 99 regular season/playoff catches for the Cowboys and 13 touchdowns, 11 of which came from inside the red zone. He was released on July 28, 2011.

=== Chicago Bears ===
After the 2011 season, Williams was released by the Cowboys. Williams agreed to sign with the Chicago Bears for a one-year, $2.46 million contract, reuniting with offensive coordinator Mike Martz, who held the same title with the Lions during Williams' Pro Bowl season. He finished with 37 receptions for 507 yards and 2 touchdowns, with his best game coming on Christmas night against the Green Bay Packers with six catches for 81 yards.

Williams announced his retirement from the NFL on his Facebook page on September 8, 2012.

== NFL career statistics ==
Receiving statistics

Year	Team	GP	Rec	Tgt	Yards	Avg	Lng	TD	FD	Fum	Lost
2004	DET	14	54	118	817	15.1	46	8	34	1	1
2005	DET	13	45	94	687	15.3	51	8	31	0	0
2006	DET	16	82	152	1,310	16.0	60	7	66	2	2
2007	DET	12	64	103	838	13.1	91	5	34	2	1
2008	DET	5	17	39	232	13.6	25	1	14	0	0
2008	DAL	10	19	43	198	10.4	38	1	12	0	0
2009	DAL	15	38	88	596	15.7	66	7	29	1	1
2010	DAL	15	37	64	530	14.3	63	5	25	3	2
2011	CHI	15	37	63	507	13.7	25	2	29	0	0
Career		115	393	552	5,715	14.5	91	44	274	9	7

Rushing statistics

Year	Team	GP	Att	Yds	Avg	Lng	TD	FD	Fum	Lost
2004	DET	14	1	1	1.0	1	0	0	0	0
2006	DET	16	2	2	1.0	2	0	0	0	0
2007	DET	12	2	1	0.5	9	0	1	0	0
2008	DAL	10	1	13	13.0	13	0	1	0	0
Career		52	6	17	2.8	13	0	2	0	0

== Personal life ==
After retiring, Williams returned to his home town of Odessa, Texas. He started an oil field trucking company tapping into the boom going on in West Texas.

Williams played a small role in the 2004 sports film Friday Night Lights (his older brother, Lloyd Hill was on the team the movie was based on). Williams played the role of an assistant coach for Midland Lee High School, which is one of Permian's biggest rivals. His one spoken line in the film was, "He ain’t going to play." Williams is also the co-founder, with college teammate BJ Johnson, of MVP Vodka, an All-American Wheat vodka made in Dallas, TX.

His older brother Lloyd Hill, ended his collegiate as the Texas Tech University all-time leading receiver and led the NCAA in receptions in 1992.
