= Jaxon Shipley =

American football player (born 1992)

No. 16
- Position: Wide receiver

Personal information
- Born: July 17, 1992 (age 34); Temple, Texas, U.S.
- Listed height: 6 ft 0 in (1.83 m)
- Listed weight: 190 lb (86 kg)

Career information
- High school: Brownwood (Brownwood, Texas)
- College: Texas (2011–2014)
- NFL draft: 2015: undrafted

Career history
- Arizona Cardinals (2015–2016)*
- * Offseason or practice squad member only

Awards and highlights
- Second-team All-Big 12 (2013)

Jaxon Shipley (born July 17, 1992) is an American former professional football wide receiver. He finished his college football career at the University of Texas as third all time in receptions and sixth in receiving yards. He was also a four-time All-Big 12 honorable mention. Shipley is the younger brother of former Texas and Cincinnati Bengals wide receiver Jordan Shipley.

After finishing at Texas, he was signed as an undrafted free agent in 2015. He spent the entire 2015 season on the Arizona Cardinals practice squad and when the season was over, he was signed to a futures contract in January 2016. After suffering an injury in training camp, Shipley was cut in September 2016.

== College career ==
Shipley came to Texas as a known name due to the success his brother Jordan had there. Jordan was the top target of quarterback Colt McCoy and coincidentally, Shipley became a top target of McCoy's younger brother Case. Shipley had one of the best freshmen years of any Texas wide receiver finishing with the second-most receptions (44), yards (607) and touchdown catches (3) of any freshman in school history. He made the 2011 Yahoo! Sports Freshman All-America Second Team.

A standout student, he made the Big 12 Commissioner's Honor Roll five times and was a 2013 Academic All-Big 12 choice.

He was a prolific receiver for the rest of his career and was a two-time watch list member for the Biletnikoff Award (2013–14).

== Professional career ==
Shipley signed with the Arizona Cardinals as an undrafted rookie free agent in 2015. Despite some good performances in preseason games, he was cut by the Cardinals but was signed to the practice squad the next day.

In 2016, he suffered an injury in training camp and dropped some passes in the first two pre-season games. On September 3, 2016, he was released by the Cardinals having just missed out on the last receiver spot.
