= B. J. Johnson (American football) =

American football player (born 1982)

B.J. Johnson
Profile
- Position: Wide receiver

Personal information
- Born: August 4, 1982 (age 44); Arlington, Texas, U.S.
- Listed height: 6 ft 1 in (1.85 m)
- Listed weight: 190 lb (86 kg)

Career information
- High school: South Grand Prairie (TX)
- College: Texas (2000–2004)
- NFL draft: 2004: undrafted

Career history
- Denver Broncos (2004)*; Tampa Bay Buccaneers (2006)*
- * Offseason or practice squad member only

Brandon Willis "B. J." Johnson (born August 4, 1982) is an American former football wide receiver. He played college football for the Texas Longhorns and was signed by the Denver Broncos of the National Football League (NFL) as an undrafted free agent in 2004. After an injury-plagued season he was released and later signed with the Tampa Bay Buccaneers before being released again before the 2006 season.

== College football ==
Johnson was recruited out of South Grand Prairie High School, where he was regarded as the top college prospect in the state and the top WR prospect in the country. he helped his team make it to the state semi-finals in his senior year. Johnson caught 71 passes that season for 1,749 yards and 20 touchdowns. In three seasons and 42 games as a starter, Johnson had 135 catches for 3,059 yards and 42 touchdowns. Johnson was heavily recruited and chose to attend Texas.

He was a Texas player from 2000 to 2003. He scored 16 touchdowns on 152 receptions for 2,389 yards.

In 2000, Johnson was the first freshman to start at wide receiver since 1992 and then had one of the best freshman receiver seasons in school history setting seven records. He set the school's freshman single-season record with 41 receptions and also set the school's single-game freshman for receptions (9) and receiving yards (187) in 2000. He and Roy Williams set the school's receiving record for two freshmen with 81 receptions for 1,507 yards and 11 touchdowns.

He caught the game-winning catch against Texas Tech in 2003.

When his college career was over, he had the 2nd most receiving TDs, 3rd most receiving yards and fourth most receptions in Texas football history. He was an All-Big 12 honorable mention in his last three seasons. He was the favorite target of Major Applewhite and 2nd favorite of Chris Simms

Johnson broke his tibia before his senior year, a fact he was unaware of until after the season was over. Then, during preparation for the Senior Bowl, he strained his oblique. His injuries meant he had to miss combines and other pre-draft exhibitions and contributed to him going undrafted.

== Pro football ==
Johnson was signed by the Denver Broncos as an undrafted free agent in part because the Broncos coach, Mike Shanahan, knew him as he'd played with Shanahan's son Kyle. He was signed to a three-year contract.

In August 2004, he was placed on the injured reserve list for the season after breaking his ankle. Later that season, he tore his hamstring. Before the 2005 season started, he was waived by the Broncos.

In January 2006 he was signed by the Tampa Bay Buccaneers where he was reunited with Simms. He injured his shoulder and was then released in May to make room on the Bucs roster for David Boston.

== Later life ==
After his football career was over, Johnson became an entrepreneur, starting a Vodka company and becoming the principal in a concrete company.
