= Jordan Shipley =

American football player (born 1985)

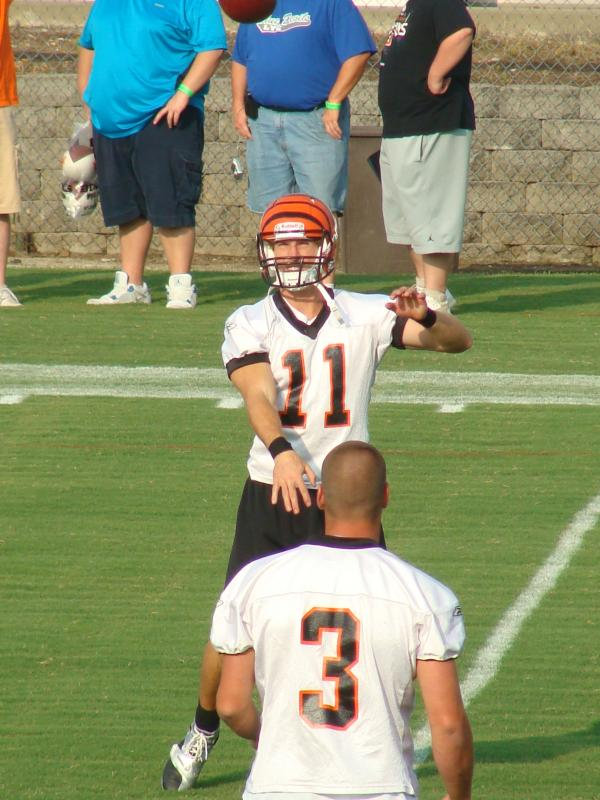
- Shipley with the Cincinnati Bengals in 2010

No. 11, 12, 16
- Position: Wide receiver

Personal information
- Born: December 23, 1985 (age 40); Temple, Texas, U.S.
- Listed height: 5 ft 11 in (1.80 m)
- Listed weight: 190 lb (86 kg)

Career information
- High school: Burnet (Burnet, Texas)
- College: Texas (2004–2009)
- NFL draft: 2010: 3rd round, 84th overall pick

Career history
- Cincinnati Bengals (2010–2011); Tampa Bay Buccaneers (2012); Jacksonville Jaguars (2012)

Awards and highlights
- BCS national champion (2005); Paul Warfield Trophy (2009); Consensus All-American (2009); First-team All-Big 12 (2009); Second-team All-Big 12 (2008)

Career NFL statistics
- Receptions: 79
- Receiving yards: 858
- Receiving touchdowns: 4
- Stats at Pro Football Reference

Jordan Shipley (born December 23, 1985) is an American former professional football player who was a wide receiver in the National Football League (NFL). Shipley played college football for the Texas Longhorns, receiving consensus All-American recognition in 2009. He was selected by the Cincinnati Bengals in the third round of the 2010 NFL draft, and also played in the NFL for the Tampa Bay Buccaneers and Jacksonville Jaguars.

== Early life ==
Shipley was born in Temple, Texas. He played high school football at Rotan High School in Rotan, Texas as a freshman in 2000, and then from 2001 to 2003 at Burnet High School in Burnet, Texas, where his father, Bob Shipley, was the head coach. Shipley holds almost every high school career receiving record for the state of Texas, including career receptions (264), receiving yards (5,424), and receiving touchdowns (73). In 2000, in his first varsity game as a freshman at Rotan High, Shipley totaled 454 all-purpose yards and returned three punts for touchdowns.

With former Dallas Cowboys quarterback Stephen McGee, Shipley helped lead the Burnet Bulldogs to back-to-back Class 3A State championship games of which they lost in 2002 and 2003. Following his record-setting high school career, Shipley played in the 2004 U.S. Army All-American Bowl with fellow Texas Longhorn Frank Okam and former Minnesota Vikings running back Adrian Peterson.

== College career ==
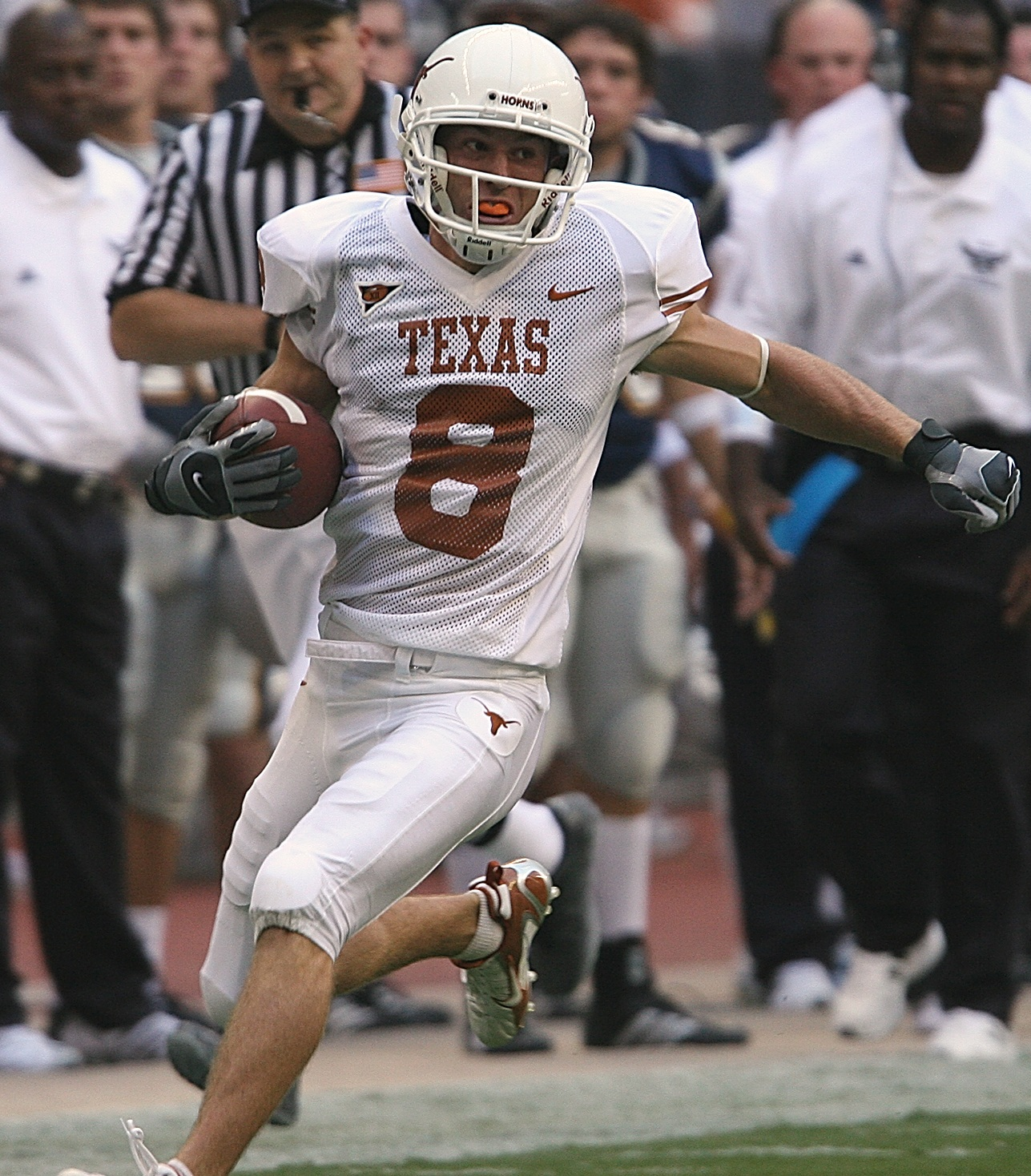
Shipley in a 2006 game at Rice

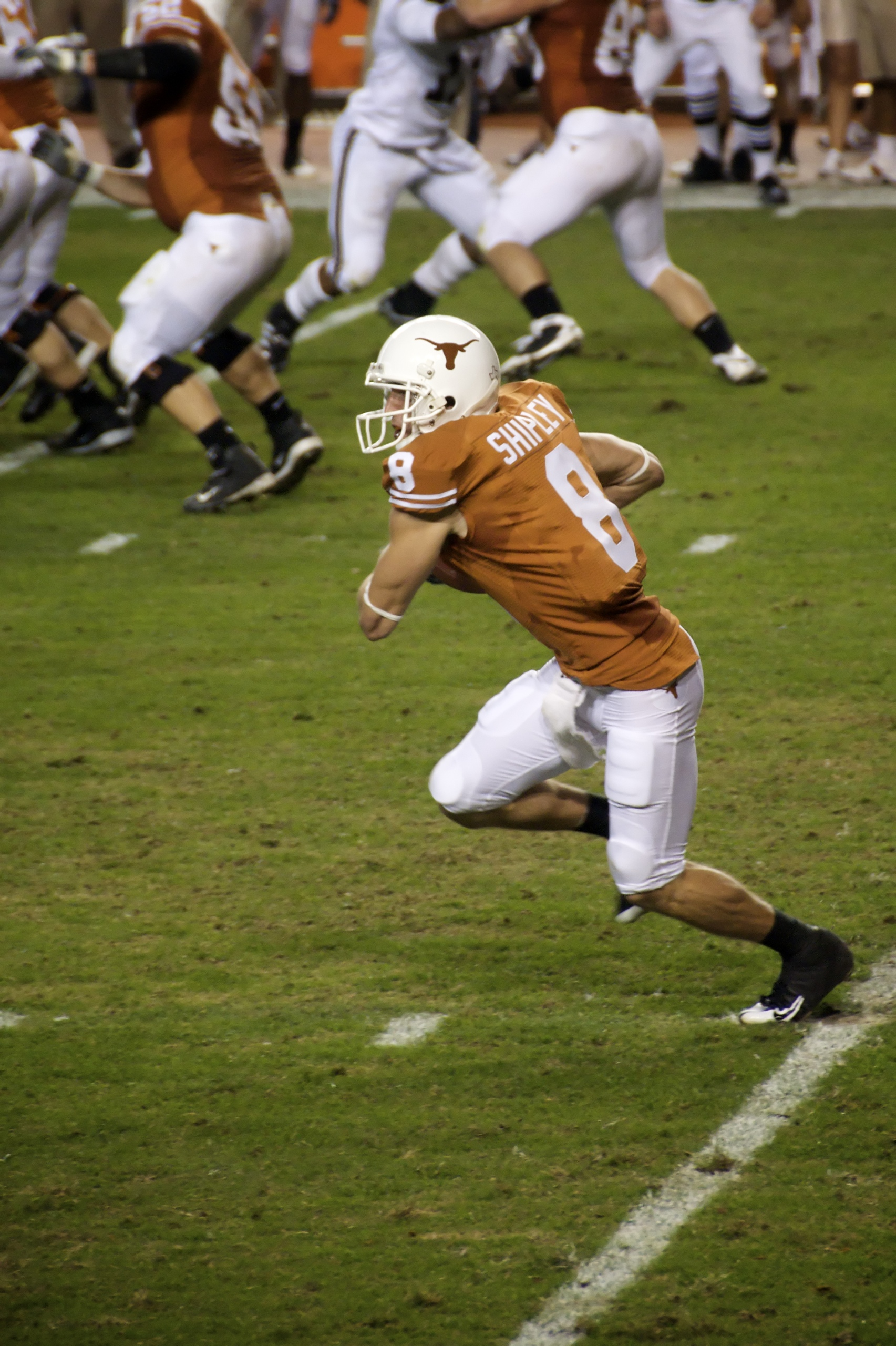
Shipley catching a pass in the 2008 A&M game

Shipley attended the University of Texas at Austin, where he played for coach Mack Brown's Texas Longhorns football team from 2004 to 2009.

=== 2008 season ===
Shipley had a stand-out game in the 2008 Texas vs. Oklahoma football game against the #1 ranked Oklahoma Sooners. He returned a kickoff 96 yards for a touchdown; it was the longest kickoff return in the 103-year history of the Red River Shootout. He also caught a touchdown pass. The Longhorns won 45–35.

On October 25, 2008, Shipley set a Texas Longhorn record for receptions, catching 15 passes for 168 yards as #1 Texas defeated #6 Oklahoma State 28–24.

Shipley was a senior in 2008, but filed paperwork with the NCAA to request an extra year of eligibility to make up for games missed due to injuries. On December 22, 2008, the NCAA granted Shipley's hardship request for a sixth season of eligibility.

Shipley made the All-Big 12 second-team after the 2008 regular season.

Following the 2008 season, Shipley underwent shoulder surgery for what he stated was "an injury I aggravated a couple of times during the year, but was able to play through. I worked hard to rehab it and kept playing. But now that I have time, I got it cleaned up and can get back to full strength for next season."

=== 2009 season ===
Shipley proved to be a vital member of the 2009 Texas Longhorn football team, including scoring a touchdown off of a Texas Tech punt in the Longhorns' 34–24 victory. On November 7, 2009, Shipley caught 11 passes for a school record 273 yards during a home game against the UCF. Shipley's play during the season helped lead Texas to the 2009 Big 12 Championship Game against Nebraska. He caught seven passes for 71 yards in the 13–12 win and helped Texas earn a spot in the 2010 BCS National Championship Game. Shipley caught two touchdown passes during the game, but Texas lost to top-ranked Alabama, 37–21.

=== Track and field ===
In addition to college football, Shipley ran track at the University of Texas, where he posted personal bests of 10.85 seconds in the 100 meters and 21.76 seconds in the 200 meters.

Personal bests

Event	Time (seconds)	Venue	Date
100 meters	10.85	Austin, Texas	April 3, 2004
200 meters	21.76	Austin, Texas	May 14, 2004

== Professional career ==
Pre-draft measurables
Height	Weight	Arm length	Hand span	40-yard dash	10-yard split	20-yard split	20-yard shuttle	Three-cone drill	Vertical jump	Broad jump	Bench press
5 ft 11 1/4 in (1.81 m)	193 lb (88 kg)	30 1/2 in (0.77 m)	9 5/8 in (0.24 m)	4.52 s	1.60 s	2.65 s	4.22 s	6.92 s	36.5 in (0.93 m)	10 ft 0 in (3.05 m)	16 reps
All values from NFL Combine/Texas Pro Day

=== Cincinnati Bengals ===
Shipley was selected by the Cincinnati Bengals in the third round of the 2010 NFL Draft (84th overall). On July 27, 2010, he signed a four-year contract for $2.54 million with a signing bonus of nearly $757,000. The contract included standard base salaries of $320,000, $405,000, $490,000 and $575,000, as well as a fourth-year escalator clause that could significantly boost the maximum value of the contract.

In Shipley's first NFL preseason game, he returned a punt 63 yards late in the fourth quarter to set up the Bengals' only score against the Dallas Cowboys.

In Week 4 of the regular season, Shipley was hit in the head by Cleveland Browns safety T. J. Ward, causing a concussion that kept him sidelined in week 5. Ward was fined $15,000 for the helmet-to-helmet contact. On October 21 against the Atlanta Falcons, Shipley recorded six receptions for 131 yards, including a 64-yard touchdown catch. He finished the season with 52 receptions for 600 yards and three touchdowns.

During the next season, 2011, in a game against the Denver Broncos in week 2, Shipley tore two ligaments in his knee – anterior cruciate ligament (ACL) and medial collateral ligament (MCL) – causing him to miss the remainder of the 2011 season.

After struggling to fully recover from the knee injury during the 2012 preseason, the Bengals waived Shipley on August 17, 2012. Offensive coordinator Jay Gruden explained, "Right now, we have a lot of good players at that position, and something had to be done." Regarding the move, Shipley later commented, "I am honestly not sure what the [Bengals'] thought process was."

=== Tampa Bay Buccaneers ===
Shipley was claimed off waivers by the Tampa Bay Buccaneers on August 20, 2012. He was released less than two weeks later during final roster cuts on August 31, but was re-signed on September 18 following an injury to starting slot receiver Preston Parker. The Buccaneers released Shipley again on September 25, two days after a game against the Dallas Cowboys in which he fumbled a punt return.

=== Jacksonville Jaguars ===
On November 20, 2012, Shipley signed with the Jacksonville Jaguars. He played in six games, catching 23 passes for 244 yards and two touchdowns.

The Jaguars officially re-signed him on March 21, 2013. He was released on September 1, 2013.

=== Retirement ===
On February 18, 2014, Shipley retired from football.

== Career statistics ==
College statistics
Year	Team	Games		Receiving				Rushing				Punt returns				Kick returns			
Year	Team	GP	GS	Rec	Yds	Avg	TD	Att	Yds	Avg	TD	Ret	Yds	Avg	TD	Ret	Yds	Avg	TD
2004	Texas	Freshman (redshirt)																	
2005	Texas	Medical (redshirt)																	
2006	Texas	13	1	16	229	14.3	4	7	110	15.7	0	0	0	0.0	0	0	0	0.0	0
2007	Texas	13	7	27	417	15.4	5	4	20	5.0	0	0	0	0.0	0	0	0	0.0	0
2008	Texas	13	13	89	1,060	11.9	11	4	32	8.0	0	6	64	10.7	1	15	394	26.3	1
2009	Texas	14	14	116	1,485	12.8	13	0	0	0.0	0	24	311	13.0	2	4	74	18.5	0
Total	53	35	248	3,191	12.9	33	16	162	10.1	0	30	375	12.5	3	19	468	24.6	1	

== Television career ==
In 2018, Shipley joined the Texas GameDay crew on the Longhorn Network following Emmanuel Acho's departure for ESPN2. He had previous on-air television experience co-hosting The Bucks of Tecomate on the Outdoor Channel.

== Personal life ==
Shipley was a college roommate of former Texas quarterback Colt McCoy. His younger brother, Jaxon, was also a wide receiver at Texas, where he played alongside Colt's younger brother, Case McCoy. In 2016, Jaxon played with the Arizona Cardinals. His cousin, Braden, is a baseball player for the Kansas City Royals.

On May 21, 2011, Shipley married Nashville songwriter Sunny Helms. The two first met in 1999 in Rotan, Texas, where Shipley was an eighth-grade quarterback and Helms was a freshman on the cheerleading squad. Shipley's father coached at Rotan for two years before moving to Burnet in 2001.

In January 2026, Shipley was severely burned during an accident on his ranch. He sustained third degree burns on over 20 percent of his body.
