= Texas Longhorns football under Mack Brown =

Seasons of Texas Longhorns under Mack Brown

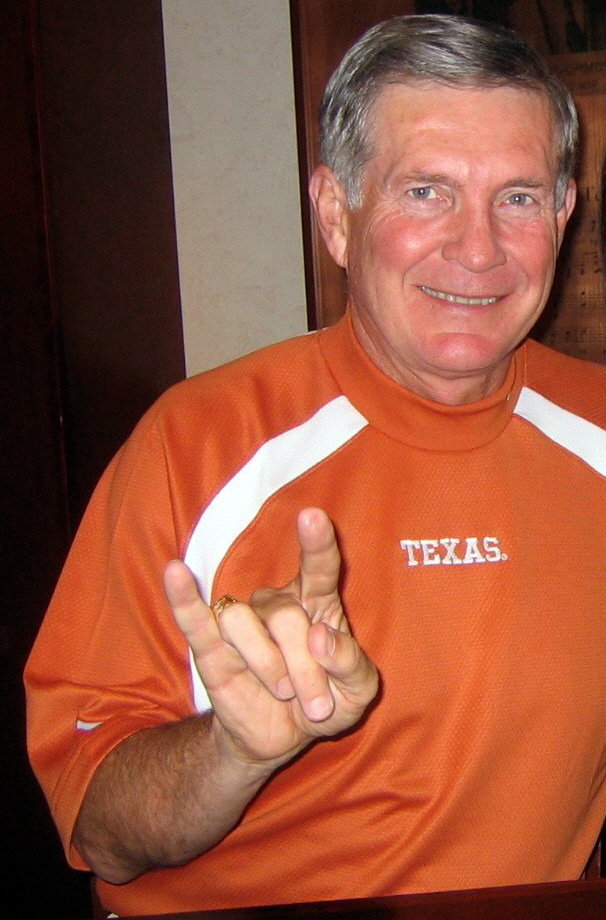
Mack Brown performing a Hook 'em Horns hand signal in 2006

William Mack Brown (born August 27, 1951) is the former head coach of the University of Texas Longhorn football team. During his tenure, the Texas Longhorns football team under Mack Brown had a winning record in 15 of 16 seasons.

Brown's Longhorns won the 2005 National Championship and seven of their ten bowl games. In 2006, he was awarded the Paul "Bear" Bryant Award for "Coach of the Year".

Prior to coaching at Texas, Brown coached at Appalachian State, Tulane, and North Carolina. (Notably, he coached North Carolina again following his time at Texas.)

Brown is credited with revitalizing North Carolina football program, and his tenure at Texas is the most successful for a head coach at the school in the 21st century to date.

== Brown's move to Texas ==
While Brown informed his North Carolina team and the media that he had no plans to leave North Carolina for the recently vacated job at the University of Texas, he was soon identified (over the objections of Longhorn Athletic Director DeLoss Dodds) by the Texas search committee as one of only two men they were interested in hiring. At the time, the Tar Heels had just completed their most successful season in years. The 1997 Tar Heels notched a 10–1 record—only the third 10-win regular season in school history. They were slated to appear in the Gator Bowl for the second year in a row—only their second (or third) New Year's Day bowl game since the Justice era. They were also all but assured of their highest final ranking in the AP Poll in half a century.

On December 2, 1997, Brown was contacted while at the ACC's football banquet in Atlanta. He agreed to meet with the hiring committee, which included Dodds, Texas coaching legend Darrell Royal, several former Texas players, and several important boosters, most notably Tom Hicks (owner of the Dallas Stars and Texas Rangers), who donated time, energy and the use of his private jet corps to the coaching search that also included an exploratory meeting with Northwestern's Gary Barnett in Chicago.

Brown met the committee on December 3 in the Four Seasons hotel in Atlanta.

The committee was impressed with Brown and Dodds offered him the job on the spot. The offer included a sizable pay raise to about $750,000 a year (which could climb to as high as $1 million with incentives), and a similar amount to recruit assistant coaches.

Brown tentatively accepted, but wanted to speak with North Carolina athletics director Dick Baddour and the North Carolina football team before making an official decision. The following day Brown met with Baddour, who had been told by the Chancellor to offer Brown a ten-year contract, as Brown relates in his autobiography:

[Baddour] came over to our house... The university offered me [a salary equal to the basketball head coach's], but Baddour made it clear that it would create a real hardship on the department if I took it. He also said, "If you want football to be equal to basketball, you should go to Texas." ... [Baddour] told us the chancellor had said to offer a ten-year contract.... He did add that he didn't feel the Board of Trustees would approve the long-term deal.

Brown called Deloss Dodds to officially accept the head coaching position at the University of Texas on December 4, 1997, at 2:30 PM, then informed Dick Baddour of his decision fifteen minutes later. At 3:00 PM, Brown held a meeting with the Tar Heel players to inform them of his decision.

That Thursday night, Brown flew to Austin. He was introduced to an enthusiastic Longhorn crowd on Friday.

As a consequence of taking the Texas post, Brown was not on the sidelines during the Tar Heels' 42–3 rout of Virginia Tech in the 1998 Gator Bowl, having been replaced as head coach by defensive coordinator Carl Torbush. North Carolina credits the 1997 regular season to Brown and the Gator Bowl to Torbush.

== Early seasons ==
In his early years at UT, Mack Brown was sometimes referred to as "Coach February", a nickname that indicated he performed well during the important recruiting season, but failed to follow up with equally impressive wins on the field. His detractors felt that with all the resources at his disposal at Texas, combined with the talent he was recruiting from high school programs, that he should have more to show for it than appearances in the Holiday Bowl or Cotton Bowl Classic. They felt that he should be playing for Big 12 titles or even National Championships instead.

In five of the first eight seasons under Brown, the Longhorns were all but eliminated from either of these two goals due to losses in October to Big 12 rival Oklahoma. Since the two teams played in the same division of the Big 12, a loss by Texas to Oklahoma means that Texas could not win the south half of the conference unless Oklahoma lost at least two conference games. Brown did however lead the University of Texas to its second Big 12 Conference Championship game only to lose to a higher ranked Nebraska team which they had beaten earlier in the year. He also took the Longhorns to the 2001 Big 12 title game. In that year's campaign, the Longhorns lost to the Sooners but were given another chance when the Sooners lost to both Nebraska and Oklahoma State. Texas made it to the Big 12 Conference Championship Game, losing to Colorado, a school they had beaten by a substantial margin earlier in the year. Many felt that Texas would have played in the BCS Championship game had they beaten Colorado. A similar opportunity presented itself in 2002. After Oklahoma beat Texas, they lost to Texas A&M and Oklahoma State. However, Texas had suffered a loss to Texas Tech so they did not make the championship game.

In 2003, Texas finished the regular season with a 10–2 regular season record and most observers felt they had the resume to reach their first BCS bowl under Brown. However, when South Champion (and #1 ranked) Oklahoma lost to North Champion Kansas State in the Big 12 championship game, Kansas State received the Big 12 conference's automatic BCS bid as conference champion and joined Oklahoma in the BCS. The BCS rules specified that no more than 2 teams from a single conference could go. Texas was frozen out.

Although Brown consistently led the Longhorns to a bowl game to cap off each season, his first six years he was not able to lead them to a Bowl Championship Series game, having to settle each year for the Holiday Bowl or Cotton Bowl Classic. His record in these games was 3 and 3, with two of the 3 losses coming at the hands of supposedly inferior teams as judged by the rankings headed into the games.

== 2004 season ==
In 2004, the Longhorns began the season with a #7 ranking nationally and started out with a 65–0 blowout of North Texas, setting several UT school records in the process. This was followed by a narrow 22–20 win against unranked Arkansas. They defeated Rice and Baylor 35–13 and 44–14 respectively.

This left them ranked fifth coming into the annual matchup with then #2 Oklahoma in the Red River Shootout. Oklahoma shut-out the Longhorns 12–0. Texas dropped to #9, before rebounding with wins over #24 Missouri 28–20, at #24 Texas Tech 51–21, and at Colorado 31–7.

Then Texas set a record for the largest come from-behind-win in school history, beating #19 Oklahoma State 56–35 after falling behind 7–35. After this performance, Texas again fell behind against Kansas but squeaked out a win 27–23. Kansas head coach Mark Mangino stirred up controversy by claiming that the officials were biased in favor of Texas.

The series of victories brought Texas back up to #5 in the rankings as they welcomed arch-rival Texas A&M to Austin and won 26–13. However, Oklahoma stood undefeated, which meant the Sooners would represent the Big 12 South in the Championship game against a much lower ranked team from the North Division. Once again, the loss to Oklahoma had kept Texas out of playing for a National or Conference Title, and had seemingly destined them to non-Bowl Championship Series bowl as well.

However, Brown began lobbying the voters in the two polls based on human voters (one on college football coaches, the other on Associated Press writers) to place the Longhorns high enough in the rankings to ensure they received a Bowl Championship Series (BCS) bowl-bid. The arcane rules of the BCS were such that Texas might get left out of the 8 chosen teams even though they ranked 5th nationally. Lobbying by Brown and his brother, et al., gave the Longhorns the sufficient swing votes they needed to make it into the Rose Bowl, one of the four BCS bowls. This lobbying effort and ensuing result led to criticism of Brown for playing politics to get his team into a top bowl. The appearance in the "Grand-daddy" of all bowl games was the first visit by the Longhorns, due mainly to the fact that the Rose Bowl traditionally pitted the winner of the Pac-10 against the winner of the Big Ten. Texas' opponent was Michigan, whom Texas was playing for the very first time. Texas won the game 38–37 on a last second field goal kick by Longhorn Dusty Mangum in what had been called one of the greatest Rose Bowl games of all time.

Ironically, Brown followed up a strong 2004 season on the field with a less successful 2005 recruiting season. Brown, who long had been criticized for recruiting top talent but not achieving the highest possible results, began to receive criticism for missing out on top recruits, especially for missing out on quarterback Ryan Perrilloux, who ended up not following through on his verbal commitment to sign with Texas.

Despite the success of the 2004 season, Coach Brown's resume was still lacking a conference championship, let alone a national championship. The 2005 season offered an opportunity to add those credentials.

== 2005 season ==
Save for redshirt Junior Quarterback Vince Young, many of Texas' key players from the previous season, including running back Cedric Benson, linebacker Derrick Johnson and tight end Bo Scaife, did not return for the 2005 season. However, Texas was given a pre-season #2 ranking (behind defending National Champions University of Southern California) by Sports Illustrated magazine, and was also ranked second in the AP and USA Today coaches pre-season polls.

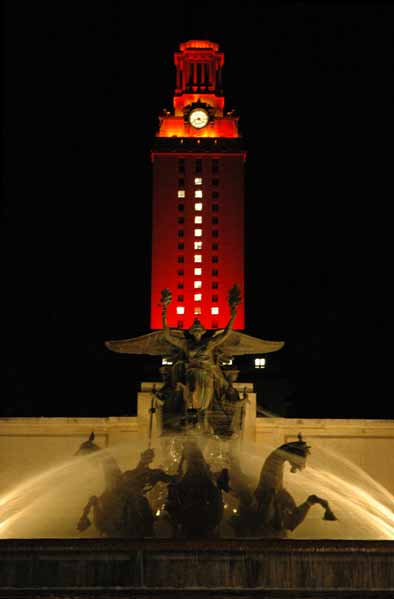
The UT Tower lit in a special configuration in honor of the 2005 National Championship football team

Texas scored a decisive 45–12 victory over Oklahoma. That marked the 6th time the Longhorns have entered the contest ranked 2nd nationally, and they have won all six times. With the win, Texas started the season 5–0 for the first time since 1983. That was the last time UT had national title hopes, ending the regular season 11–0 before losing to Georgia in the Cotton Bowl Classic.

After the win over previously undefeated Texas Tech, Texas moved into first place in the Bowl Championship Series (BCS) standings for the first time since the BCS creation. The BCS formula, which takes into account strength of schedule, allowed Texas to advance in the rankings since they defeated a previously unbeaten team, while University of Southern California beat Washington, a 1–6 team.

Texas' place at the top of the BCS rankings lasted only one week. On October 29, Texas beat an Oklahoma State University Cowboys team that had struggled so far that season. Despite OSU's 0–5 start to conference play, Texas found themselves behind early in the game and for the third straight year, Texas found themselves trailing a lower-ranked Oklahoma State team at half-time. For the third straight year, Texas came from behind to win by a sizable margin. Vince Young set a school record for rushing yards in a game by a quarterback with 267, and accounted for 506 total yards of offense to lead the team to victory. Over the past 3 meetings between the two schools, the Longhorns outscored the Cowboys by a combined second-half score of 118–0.

Texas retained the top spot in the computer rankings, but not by enough to stay ahead of USC overall. After both teams won all their remaining games, USC and Texas were ranked 1 and 2, respectively; Texas then defeated USC 41–38 in the Rose Bowl, winning the National Championship.

On January 11, 2006, Brown was named the Paul "Bear" Bryant College Football Coach of the Year. Not since Darrell Royal's victory in 1963 has a coach from The University of Texas at Austin been given this honor. Voted by the National Sportscasters and Sportswriters Association, this award not only affirms the talent, skills and vision of Coach Mack Brown but strengthens the athletic and academic record achieved during his UT tenure. Eighteen players on the 2006 Rose Bowl roster entered the game with the coursework for their college degree complete.

== 2006 season ==
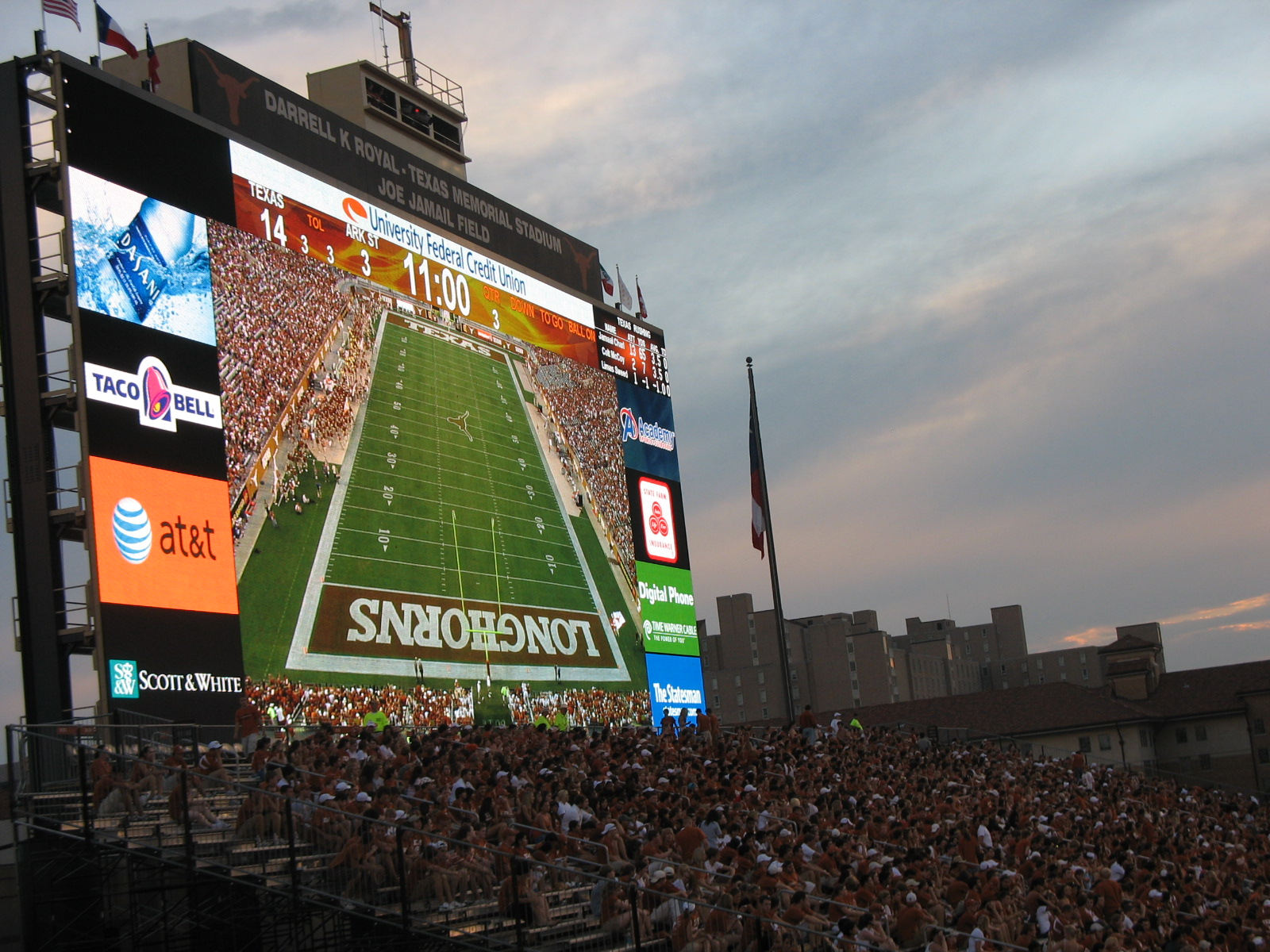
Mack Brown's tenure included stadium modernization and expansion, including the 2006 installation of the Godzillatron scoreboard which for a time was the largest in the world. It is still the largest high-definition video screen in collegiate sports.

As the defending national champions, Texas began the season ranked #2 in the polls, but having to replace the NFL-departed quarterback Vince Young with freshman Colt McCoy. After winning their opener, the Longhorns in game two lost convincingly to #1 ranked Ohio State in Austin. The Horns rebounded to win seven straight (including a second straight win over nemesis Oklahoma) to climb into the Big 12 South driver's seat and entertain thoughts of a rematch with Ohio State in the national championship. However, in the season's 10th game, McCoy was injured and Texas was shocked on the road by Kansas State. After the loss, the Horns returned home still needing just one win to clinch the Big 12 South. However, even though McCoy returned Texas was again shocked, losing 12–7 to intrastate rival Texas A&M. The loss snapped UT's 6-game winning streak over the Aggies. Settling for the Alamo Bowl, Texas defeated a 6–6 Iowa team in a close game.

== 2007 season ==
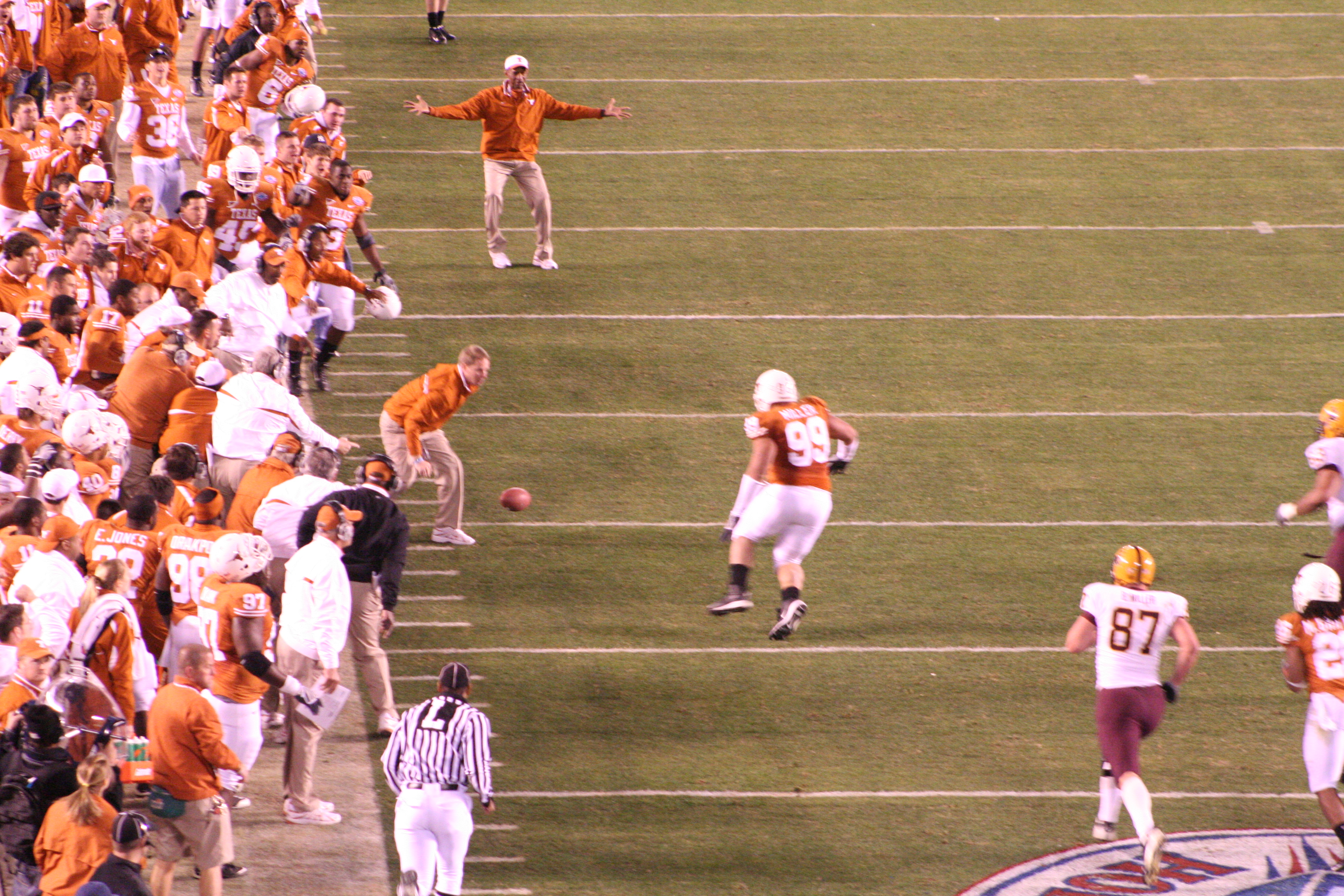
The 2007 Holiday Bowl included a controversial play where Mack Brown's stepson and other Texas personnel were on the field.

As Mack Brown entered his 10th season as the head coach of the Texas Longhorns he had a won/loss record of 93 22 and he had the best winning percentage (.809) of any coach in Longhorn history. The 2007 Texas Longhorns football team began play on September 1, 2007. Texas entered the 2007 season ranked third in the all-time list of both total wins and winning percentage. They are ranked in the Top 10 by numerous pre-season polls. For instance, a pre-season ranking by ESPN writer Mark Schlabach has the Longhorns ranked eighth; Rivals.com has them at ninth. College Football News and Real Football 365 both have the Longhorns ranked third. The Longhorns come into the season ranked fourth in both the Coaches Poll and AP Poll.

Prior to the season, two Longhorns were arrested for driving while intoxicated and will serve three-game suspensions; two other players were arrested on armed robbery charges and were removed from the team. Brown said "I am extremely disappointed that four of our student-athletes have had issues with the law this summer. That is not reflective of the high standard of class, character and integrity we have established at Texas for many years. It's a shame that these recent events have generated a great deal of negative attention, because I do think that overall, this is as good of a group of kids that I’ve ever coached. I think that will show over time."

For the second straight year, UT merchandise were the top-selling products among clients of Collegiate Licensing Company. UT is using part of the money to give Mack Brown a raise. The University of Texas Board of Regents voted unanimously to raise Brown's salary by $300,000. This brings his annual compensation to $2.81 million and keeps him among the five highest paid coaches in the sport. The package also includes up to $3 million in bonuses, including "$100,000 if he wins the Big 12 Championship and $450,000 if he wins this year's national championship, as well as bonuses based on the percent of players who graduate." Brown's contract is good through the 2016 season and includes buy-out clauses should another school attempt to hire Brown.

Texas won their first four games although three of them were closer than analysts had expected. Following that, Texas was upset by the Kansas State Wildcats 41–21. Kansas State had no turnovers and scored 21 points on defense and special teams. They scored one touchdown on a punt return, one on a kick return, and one on an interception. Previously, Texas had never allowed all three types of scores in a single season. The 41 points were the most scored against Texas in Austin since UCLA handed the Longhorns a 66–3 loss in 1997, and it was the worst home defeat in the Mack Brown era at Texas. Texas lost again the following week in the 2007 Red River Shootout, 28–21. With that loss, Texas opened conference play 0–2 for the first time since 1956, when they were in the Southwest Conference and one year before Darrell Royal became head coach of the Longhorns. In their ninth regular season game, Texas outscored Nebraska 28–25, marking Brown's 100th win at Texas. In their next two games, the Longhorns would defeat Oklahoma State and Texas Tech, but in their final matchup against archrival Texas A&M, the Longhorns lost 30–38. This marked the Longhorns' second straight loss to the Aggies. Despite the loss, Texas went to the Holiday Bowl to defeat 11th-ranked Arizona State 52–34. The Longhorns finished the season 10–3, marking their seventh consecutive 10-win season. This streak became the third highest in FBS history, trailing Florida State's 14 from 1987 to 1900 and Miami's 8 from 1985 to 1992.

== 2008 season ==
The 2008 Texas Longhorns football team entered the season ranked 10th in the USA Today Coaches Poll. They won their first four games to rise to number 5 in the national rankings. Texas began Big 12 Conference play on October 4, 2008, with a trip to Boulder, Colorado and a win over the Colorado Buffaloes. On October 11, 2008, they defeated the number-one ranked Oklahoma Sooners in the 103rd Red River Shootout. It was the third UT win in four seasons, and the first time in Brown's tenure for either team to upset the other in the Red River Shootout.

Following the victory over OU, the Longhorns vaulted up the standings to first place in the AP, ESPN/USA Today, and Harris Polls. In their next game they secured a win over #11 Missouri in Austin, setting a new school, state, and conference attendance record in the process. It was the first time since 1977 for the Longhorns to play a home football game as the #1 team in the AP. They were ranked #1 in the first BCS standings of 2008. Texas defending the first-place ranking by beating another top-ten team, the Oklahoma State Cowboys. They lost to Texas Tech in the final second of the game and fell to #4 in the BCS rankings.

The Longhorns entered 2008 as the third most victorious program in college football history, in terms of both total wins and win percentage. Only Notre Dame and the University of Michigan had won more games and a greater percentage of games played than Texas, On November 8, 2008, Texas' 45–21 victory over Baylor was the 829th win for the UT football program, which tied Notre Dame for 2nd in the list of total wins. Notre Dame lost later the same day, leaving the two teams tied. Texas pulled ahead of Notre Dame at the end of the regular season, to take sole possession of #2 on the list.

Texas won a road game against Kansas 35–7; ensuring their eighth consecutive season with ten or more wins per season. That is the longest active streak in the nation and it ties them with Miami (1985–92) for the second-longest streak of all time.

Texas finished the 2008 regular season with a win over Texas A&M, the Longhorns longest running-rivalry opponent. The biggest margin of victory in the history of the series occurred when Texas beat A&M 48–0 in 1898. Texas nearly equaled that record this year by producing a 49–9 victory, the second-largest margin of victory for this rivalry series. It was also the 200th career win for Mack Brown, and it set a new attendance record for UT, the State of Texas, the Big 12 Conference, and the southwest region. This left Texas in a three-way tie (with Oklahoma and Texas Tech) for the Big 12 South championship, which created a controversy over BCS rankings and conference tie-breaking procedures.

Texas defeated Ohio State 24–21 in the 2009 Fiesta Bowl to finish the season 12–1.

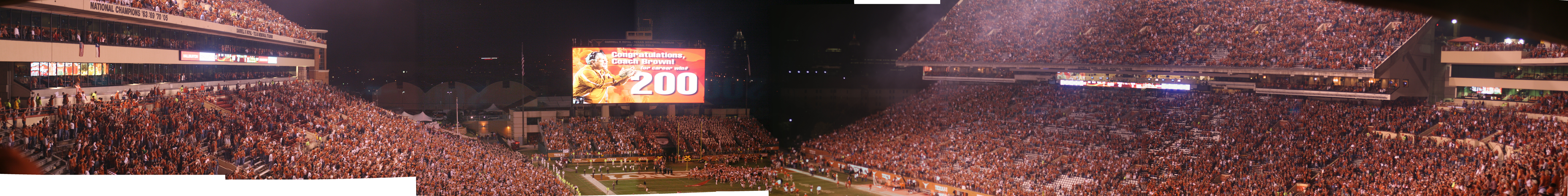
Godzillatron announces Mack Brown's 200th career win before the largest crowd for a Texas or Big 12 football game.

== 2009 season ==
In 2009, the Longhorns started the season ranked #2 nationally. Back-to-back blowouts over non-conference teams Louisiana-Monroe and Wyoming were followed up with a 10-point victory at home over rival Texas Tech. A victory over UTEP was followed by a decisive but sloppy win over Colorado, which dropped Texas to #3 nationally.

Texas defeated #21 Oklahoma in the Red River Rivalry game 16–13. Quarterback Colt McCoy's touchdown-saving tackle following an interception late in the game was followed up with a game-sealing interception by Aaron Williams to defeat the Sooners.

The Longhorns then won five straight games by 27 points or more. A 41–7 victory over Missouri was followed up with a 41–14 win over #13 Oklahoma State, which put the Longhorns back to #2 in the AP Poll. Texas then beat UCF, Baylor and Kansas by a combined 96 points. Texas clinched a spot in the Big 12 championship game by winning the Southern division following the victory over Kansas. McCoy became the all-time winningest quarterback in college football following the Kansas win, a record that lasted two years before being bested by Kellen Moore at Boise State. In their final regular season contest, the Longhorns beat Texas A&M Aggies, 49–39.

Texas defeated #21 Nebraska in a controversial Big 12 Championship Game 13–12. On the play immediately prior to kicker Hunter Lawrence's game-winning field goal, McCoy threw away a pass as time appeared to expire. Video replay showed that McCoy's pass hit a stadium railing out of bounds with :01 left, allowing Texas to kick the winning field goal to advance to the BCS title game.

In the BCS National Championship Game, Texas lost to #1-ranked Alabama 37–21. McCoy suffered an injury early in the game, and backup quarterback Garrett Gilbert threw four interceptions. The game is the last BCS Championship or College Football Playoff game the Longhorns have played in as of 2022.

== 2010–2013 ==
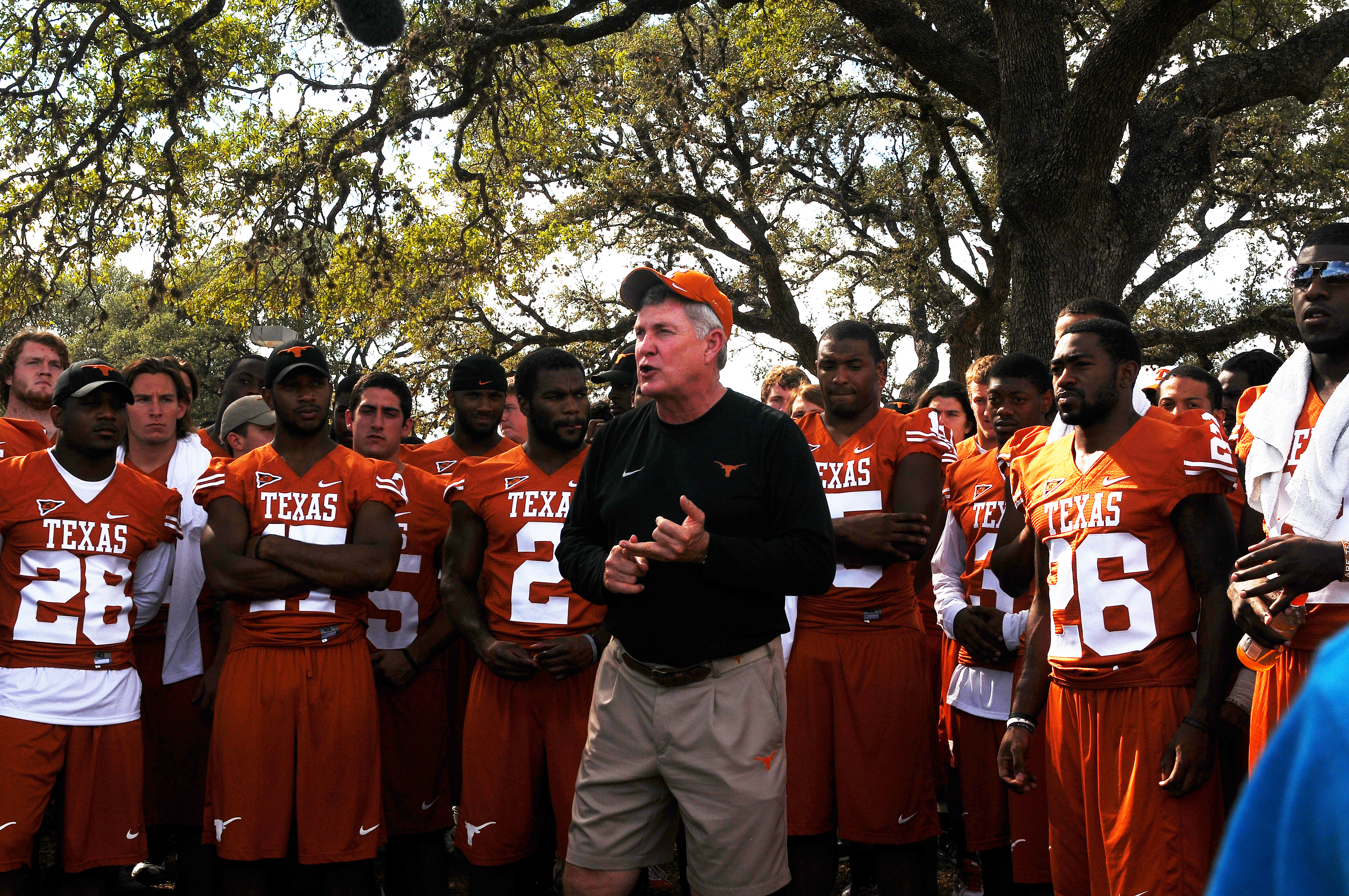
Mack Brown with team in 2011

Brown coached the Longhorns for four more seasons after the championship loss. In 2010, the team had a losing record and did not play in a bowl game for the first and only time under Brown. The period peaked with a nine win season and Alamo Bowl victory in 2012. On December 14, 2013, he announced his resignation as head coach following the end of the season. In Brown's final game at Texas, the Longhorns lost 30–7 to the #10 Oregon Ducks in the Alamo Bowl.

== After Texas ==
Brown was out of coaching for five years following his resignation at Texas. He returned as head coach at North Carolina for the 2019 season, and remains in the position as of the 2022 season.

== Brown's Legacy to Date ==
Texas Longhorns' Head Coach Mack Brown's year-by-year records (with bowl appearances) are as follows:

| Year | Team | Overall record | Conference record | Conference Standing | Bowl Appearance | Bowl W/L | Bowl Opponent | Bowl Score | Final Coaches Poll | Final AP Poll | Title(s) Won |
|---|---|---|---|---|---|---|---|---|---|---|---|
| 1998 | Texas | 9–3 | 6–2 | 2nd | Cotton Bowl | W | Mississippi State | 38–11 | 16 | 15 | |
| 1999 | Texas | 9–5 | 6–2 | 1st | Cotton Bowl | L | Arkansas | 6–27 | 23 | 21 | Division |
| 2000 | Texas | 9–3 | 7–1 | 2nd | Holiday Bowl | L | Oregon | 30–35 | 12 | 12 | |
| 2001 | Texas | 11–2 | 7–1 | 1st | Holiday Bowl | W | Washington | 47–43 | 5 | 5 | Division |
| 2002 | Texas | 11–2 | 6–2 | T 1st | Cotton Bowl | W | LSU | 35–20 | 7 | 6 | Division |
| 2003 | Texas | 10–3 | 7–1 | 2nd | Holiday Bowl | L | Washington State | 20–28 | 11 | 12 | |
| 2004 | Texas | 11–1 | 7–1 | 2nd | Rose Bowl | W | Michigan | 38–37 | 4 | 5 | |
| 2005 | Texas | 13–0 | 8–0 | 1st | Rose Bowl | W | USC | 41–38 | 1 | 1 | Division, Conference, National |
| 2006 | Texas | 10–3 | 6–2 | 2nd | Alamo Bowl | W | Iowa | 26–24 | 13 | 13 | |
| 2007 | Texas | 10–3 | 5–3 | 2nd | Holiday Bowl | W | Arizona State | 52–34 | 10 | 10 | |
| 2008 | Texas | 12–1 | 7–1 | T 1st | Fiesta Bowl | W | Ohio State | 24–21 | 3 | 4 | Division |
| 2009 | Texas | 13–1 | 8–0 | 1st | BCS National Championship Game | L | Alabama | 21–37 | 2 | 2 | Division, Conference |
| 2010 | Texas | 5–7 | 2–6 | 6th | None | n/a | n/a | n/a | UR | UR | |
| 2011 | Texas | 8–5 | 4–5 | 6th | Holiday Bowl | W | California | 21–10 | 24 | 24 | |
| 2012 | Texas | 9–4 | 5–4 | 3rd | Alamo Bowl | W | Oregon State | 31–27 | 18 | 19 | |
| 2013 | Texas | 8–5 | 7–2 | T 2nd | Alamo Bowl | L | Oregon | 30–7 | NR | NR | |

Texas finished 158–48 (0.766) under Head Coach Mack Brown, and 98–33 (0.748) in Big 12 Conference play. The team played in the Big 12 Conference through the duration of Brown's tenure, and in the South division until 2011 following the departure of Nebraska and Colorado from the conference. The Longhorns were 10–5 in bowl games under Brown and were bowl-eligible for 15 of 16 seasons during his tenure, including 12 straight years from 1998 to 2009. Brown won the Big 12 South division title six times, the Big 12 Conference title twice (2005, 2009), and the National Championship once (2005).

== After Brown ==
On November 18, 2008, The University of Texas announced that Longhorn defensive coordinator Will Muschamp would succeed Mack Brown as head football coach, though there was no timetable set for Brown's departure and both Brown and UT said they expected Brown to stay a long time. Following the Longhorns' 5–7 season in 2010, Muschamp accepted the head coaching position at the University of Florida.

Charlie Strong was hired from the University of Louisville to replace Brown for the 2014 season, but was fired following the 2015 season after posting an 11–14 record.

Tom Herman replaced Strong for the 2016 season. Herman went 32–18 in four seasons as head coach. His time featured a conference runner-up finish in 2018 and a 4–0 bowl record, including a Sugar Bowl victory over Georgia in 2018. Despite his relative success, Herman was fired on January 2, 2021.

Steve Sarkisian replaced Herman, and had a 5–7 record in the 2021 season. The 2022 season showed much improvement, with Texas earning a bowl berth and appearing in the AP Poll and College Football Playoff Poll. Texas finally broke through in 2023, winning the Big 12 in their final season in the conference en route to their first College Football Playoff appearance. However, the Longhorns fell to Washington in the Sugar Bowl 37–31 and just missed playing in their first national championship since Brown left. The 2024 season (in which Texas played their first season in the SEC) showed similar results, as the Horns jumped to #1 in the AP Poll for the first time since 2009, but a loss to Georgia knocked them down to #5. Texas ultimately competed in the SEC Championship in their first season in the conference, but again lost to Georgia in overtime. Despite this, Texas clinched their second straight appearance in the College Football Playoff, this time in the first 12-team bracket. The Longhorns beat Clemson in the first round and Arizona State in the Peach Bowl to get to the semifinals again. However, in the Cotton Bowl, the Longhorns were defeated by Ohio State 28–14 and again just fell one game short of their first national championship appearance since the Brown era.

== Notable statistics and accomplishments ==
- 2005 NCAA Football National Championship (game played in January 2006)
- 2005 Big 12 Conference Championship
- 11 consecutive winning seasons
- 11 consecutive bowl game appearances
- Big 12 Conference record 21 consecutive conference wins from 2004–2006.
- Player awards at Texas under Brown include a Heisman Trophy winner (Ricky Williams), two Maxwell Award winners (Ricky Williams, Vince Young), a Davey O'Brien Award Winner, two Doak Walker Award winners, a Butkus Award winner, two Thorpe Award winners and four national player of the year honors. Texas has also had 23 All-Americans, 37 first-team All-Big 12 selections, two Big 12 Offensive Players of the Year, two Big 12 Conference Defensive Players of the Year and seven Big 12 Freshman of the Year honorees.
- The Longhorns featured the only 3,000-yard passer, the only 2,000-yard rusher, the only 1,000-yard receivers and the only 1,000-yard passer/rusher in UT history.
- Brown is one of only three head coaches in NCAA Division I-A history who has coached players that recorded a 2,000-yard rushing season, a 1,000-yard receiving season and a 3,000-yard passing season. Also, Vince Young stands as the first player in NCAA history to rush for 1,000 yards (1,050) and throw for 2,500 yards (3,036) in a single season.
- Under Brown's tenure, only four players have left the Texas team for the NFL draft with any eligibility remaining. The first was Kwame Cavil who went undrafted. Vince Young was drafted third overall in the 2006 NFL draft. Jamaal Charles and Jermichael Finley both announced they would enter the 2008 NFL draft. Other players, such as Jevan Snead have elected to transfer to other schools.
- Brown was 30–16 against their three main rivals: Texas A&M, Oklahoma, and Texas Tech.
- The Longhorns were 10–5 in bowl games under Brown.
- Brown is second among all active coaches with 17 consecutive winning seasons, behind only Bobby Bowden with 30.
- On November 8, 2008, Texas' 45–21 victory over Baylor was the 829th win for the UT football program, which tied Notre Dame for 2nd in the list of total wins.

== Annual salary ==
Brown's annual salary since his arrival at Texas in 1998 is as follows. Brown will make an additional $100,000 each year, not including incentives.

| Year | Salary |
|---|---|
| 1998 | $750,000 |
| 1999 | $1,000,000 |
| 2000 | $1,200,000 |
| 2001 | $1,450,000 |
| 2002 | $1,700,000 |
| 2003 | $2,059,000 |
| 2004 | $2,159,000 |
| 2005 | $2,159,000 |
| 2006 | $2,559,000 |
| 2007 | $2,900,000 |
| 2008 | $3,000,000 |
| 2009 | At least $5 million |
| 2010 | At least $5 million |
| 2011 | At least $5 million |
| 2012 | $5,292,500 |
| 2013 | $5,392,500 |

=== Salary controversy ===
In 2009, Brown's salary was increased to $5.1 million (excluding bonuses and incentives) a raise of about $2 million. The raise led to much controversy on the UT campus as it came at a time when academic programs were facing significant cutbacks. On December 14, 2009, the UT faculty council held a special meeting to consider the following resolution

"We appreciate the contributions of the athletic staff and, especially, the student-athletes, to the community of the University of Texas at Austin. However, at a time when students are facing a deteriorating academic environment in the form of declining class offerings and increasing class sizes, and lecturers, teaching assistants, and staff are facing job terminations, we believe a permanent raise of $2 million (a sum greater than the entire career earnings of a typical university employee) offered to any member of the university community is unseemly and inappropriate."

However, Brown's salary is not paid from state tax dollars, unlike nearly all university employees. When asked about the raise, university officials noted that Brown's salary is "paid entirely with money raised by the athletic department revenues. . . No state tax money is used."

== Outside of football ==
Mack Brown is married to his wife, Sally. They have 4 children: Matt Jessee, Katherine Brown, Barbara Wilson, and Chris Jessee.

In Austin, the Browns continue to be active in community affairs, serving as honorary co-chairpersons of the Capital Campaign for the Helping Hands of Austin. The Brown's have been instrumental in the opening of The Rise School of Austin (an early childhood education program that integrates children who have disabilities with their typically developing peers) and serve on the schools Board of Directors. They lent their name along with legendary UT QB James Street to the First Annual James Street/Mack Brown Golf Tournament benefiting The Rise School.

The Browns' have endorsed [a] new Texas license plate, which is designed to raise public awareness for child abuse and neglect and the need for Court Appointed Special Advocates (CASA) volunteers. After the Aggie Bonfire tragedy at Texas A&M in 1999, the couple initiated a blood drive on the UT campus that attracted more than 250 blood donors."

In October 2006, Mack Brown made a cameo appearance in the television pilot for Friday Night Lights. Early in the show, a resident is heard to say "Who does he think he is? He ain't no Mack Brown." Later in the pilot, the real Mack Brown plays the role of a local football booster quizzing high-school coach Eric Taylor on his pre-game preparation.
