= 2012 Alamo Bowl =

2012 Valero Alamo Bowl
- 20th Anniversary
Texas Longhorns	Oregon State Beavers
(8–4)	(9–3)
Big 12	Pac-12
31	27
Head coach: Mack Brown	Head coach: Mike Riley
AP / Coaches / BCS; NR / 25 / 23	AP / Coaches / BCS; 15 / 14 / 13
	1	2	3	4	Total
Texas	3	7	7	14	31
Oregon State	10	10	7	0	27
- Date: December 29, 2012
- Season: 2012
- Stadium: Alamodome
- Location: San Antonio, Texas
- MVP: Offensive – Marquise Goodwin (Texas); Defensive – Alex Okafor (Texas)
- Favorite: Oregon St. by 3½
- Referee: Hubert Owens (SEC)
- Attendance: 65,277
- Payout: US$2.25 million per team

United States TV coverage
- Network: ESPN & LHN
- Announcers: Sean McDonough (ESPN) & Craig Way (LHN) (Play-by-Play); Chris Spielman (ESPN) & Roger Wallace (LHN) (Analyst); Quint Kessenich (ESPN) & Kaylee Hartung (LHN) (Sidelines)

The 2012 Valero Alamo Bowl, the 20th edition of the game, was a postseason college football bowl game between the Texas Longhorns and the Oregon State Beavers at the Alamodome in San Antonio, Texas, held on December 29, 2012 at 5:45 p.m. CST and was broadcast on ESPN. The game was the final contest of the 2012 NCAA Division I-Football Bowl Subdivision (Division I-FBS) football season for both teams, and ended in a 31–27 victory for Texas. Texas represented the Big 12 Conference (Big 12) in the game, while Oregon State represented the Pac-12 Conference (Pac-12).

Texas was selected as a participant in the 2012 Alamo Bowl following an 8–4 regular season, during which they won their first four games before losing two games. Texas then won four straight games before losing the final two contests of the season. Facing the Longhorns were the Oregon State Beavers with a regular season record of 9–3, highlighted with wins against two top–25 teams in a six-game winning streak to start the season, including then-No. 13 (Note: All rankings are based on the Associated Press (AP) Poll unless otherwise noted.) Wisconsin. However, the Beavers lost three of their final six games.

The first half of the game featured a dominant performance by Oregon State. Texas was held to no first downs in the first quarter, the first occurrence of such since losing 21–63 to Oklahoma earlier in the year. At the end of the half, Oregon State led 20–10, which included two rushing touchdowns by the Beavers by running backs Storm Woods and Terron Ward. Texas' only touchdown came on a 64-yard touchdown on a reverse play by Marquise Goodwin. The second half of the game in contrast featured a dominant performance by Texas. Texas would score first in the half on a rushing touchdown by quarterback David Ash. Oregon State would respond with a touchdown at the end of the quarter; however, Texas would score 14 unanswered points in the fourth quarter to take their first lead of the game and would subsequently win after stopping Oregon State on their last possession, 31–27.

Texas wide receiver Marquise Goodwin was named offensive player of the game. He finished with four receptions for 68 receiving yards and one receiving touchdown, as well as 64 rushing yards, all of which came on one touchdown run. Texas defensive end Alex Okafor was named defensive player of the game. He finished with 4.5 sacks, an Alamo Bowl record and third most recorded in a Division I FBS bowl game.

== Teams ==
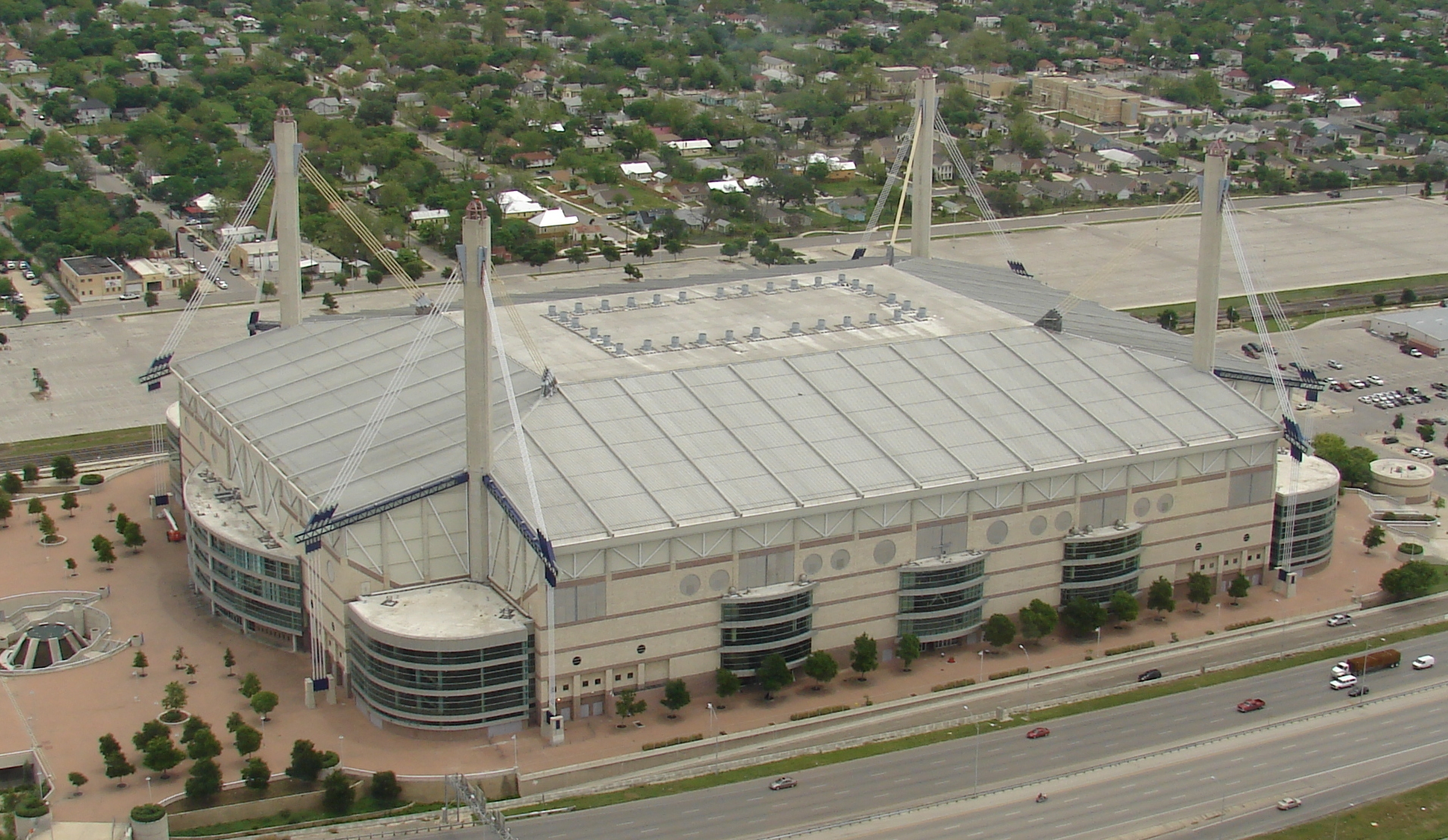
The Alamodome is the site of the 2012 Alamo Bowl.

The Alamo Bowl had contracts with the Big 12 and Pac-12 Conferences that allowed them to select one team from each conference to participate in their annual game. By virtue of being the Big 12 champion, the Kansas State Wildcats were awarded an automatic Bowl Championship Series (BCS) bowl berth; they would play in the 2013 Fiesta Bowl. Although the Oklahoma Sooners finished the season as Big 12 co–champions and qualified for selection in a BCS bowl berth, they were not selected for at-large positions in the Fiesta Bowl or the Sugar Bowl. No. 4 Oregon and No. 3 Florida took the at-large BCS positions, respectively. As a result, Oklahoma was selected to play in the Cotton Bowl. This caused Texas, ranked third in the conference at the end of the season, to be selected to play in the Alamo Bowl.

Oregon State finished fourth in the Pac-12 at the end of the season. As Pac-12 champion, the Stanford Cardinal was awarded an automatic invitation to the Rose Bowl after defeating the UCLA Bruins in the 2012 Pac-12 Football Championship Game. Despite not participating in the conference championship because of its loss to Stanford, Oregon was selected to fill the at-large position in the BCS. UCLA was instead selected to play in the 2012 Holiday Bowl. This left Oregon State, the only remaining ranked team in the Pac-12 conference, to be selected to play in the Alamo Bowl.

On December 2, 2012, Texas and Oregon State accepted invitations to play in the 20th edition of the Alamo Bowl on December 29, 2012. The Longhorns and Beavers have faced each other twice, in 1980 and in 1987; Texas won both games. In the first meeting, the Texas team shut out Oregon State, 35–0; in the second meeting, Texas won 61–16. The bowl game will be Oregon State's 15th bowl game, with their last being a 20–44 loss to the BYU Cougars in the 2009 Las Vegas Bowl. The game will be Texas' 51st bowl appearance, which is second-most in the nation. Texas has played in the Alamo Bowl once before, when they defeated the Iowa Hawkeyes 26–24 in the 2006 Alamo Bowl.

=== Texas ===
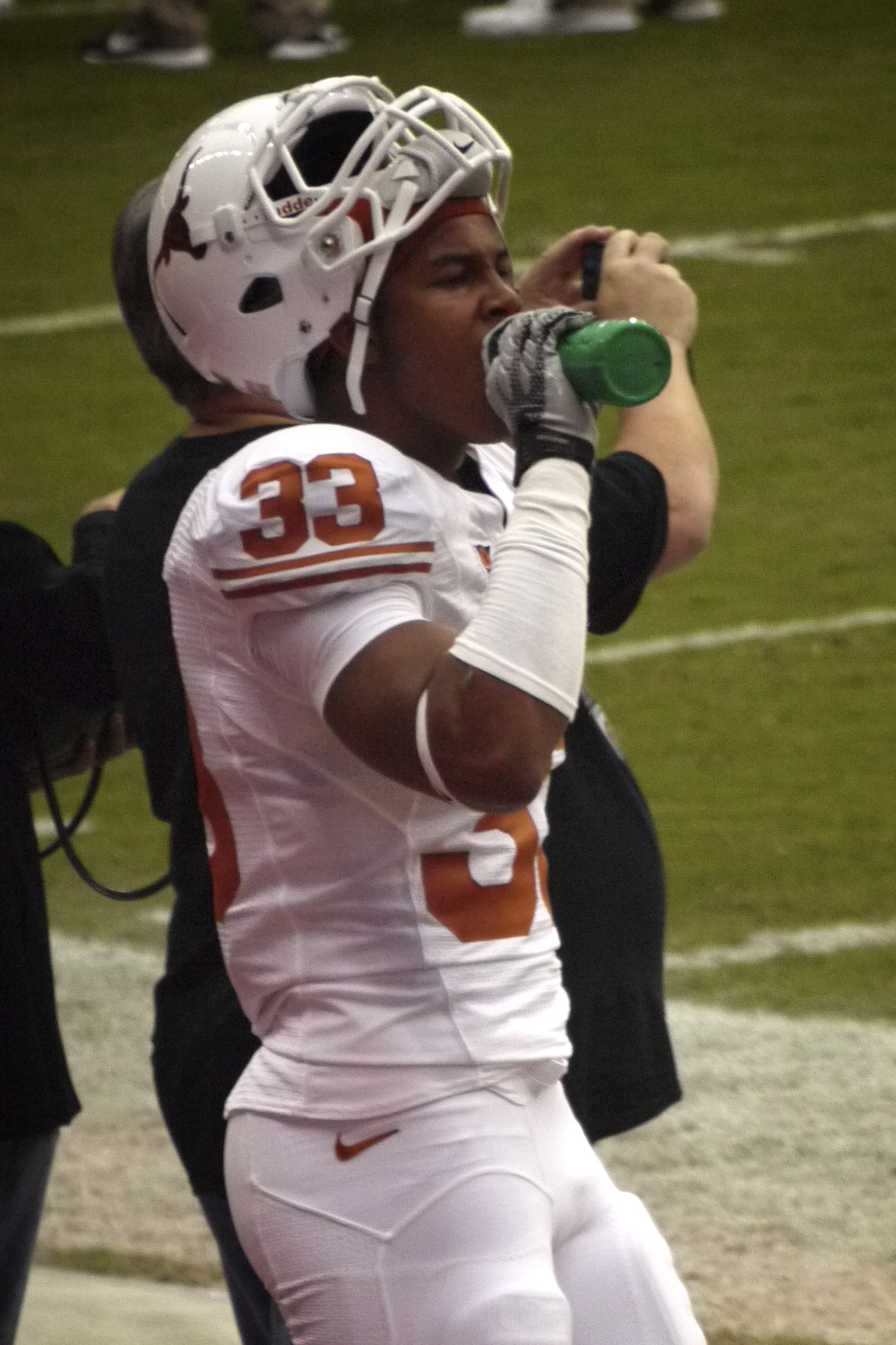
Texas linebacker Jordan Hicks, in 2010

Entering 2012, the Texas Longhorns had finished an 8–5 season in 2011, where they finished ranked 6th in the Big 12 Conference, but finished unranked nationally in both the AP Poll and Coaches' Polls. At the end of the regular season, Texas was invited to play in the 2011 Holiday Bowl against California, a bowl game in which the Longhorns won 21–10. 16 starting players returned to the Texas Longhorns football team from 2011 to 2012, which included nine offensive and seven defensive players.

Texas opened the regular season at home with a non-conference win against Wyoming, 37–17, after trailing 9–7 in the first quarter. This was followed by a shutout win against New Mexico, another Mountain West Conference (MWC) team, 45–0. Texas' final non–conference game was an away game against a Southeastern Conference (SEC) team, Ole Miss. Texas won their final non–conference game with a 66–31 win. The 66 points scored against Ole Miss were the highest number of points allowed by the Rebels since 1917, and the most points scored by Texas since playing against Colorado in the 2005 Big 12 Championship Game, a lopsided victory that was won by Texas 70–3. Texas quarterback David Ash threw for a career-high 326 yards and four touchdowns.

After a bye week, the Longhorns began Big 12 conference play against Oklahoma State, the defending 2011 Big 12 Champions. Oklahoma State was ranked No. 22 in the Coaches' Poll, but remained unranked in the AP Poll. Texas won the conference game 41–36, on the heels of a controversial 2 yard touchdown run by runningback Joe Bergeron in the final minute of regulation. The final, game-winning drive also included a 29-yard throw from David Ash to tight end D.J. Grant on fourth down and six. The Texas Longhorns lost the following game against No. 8 West Virginia 45–48, despite leading 28–27 at halftime. In the annual Red River Rivalry against No. 13 Oklahoma, Texas was routed by the Sooners for a second year in a row, losing 21–63. In 2011, Texas was also blown out by a similar margin, losing 17–55. At halftime, Oklahoma had already led Texas 36–2.

Following the two game losing skid, Texas rebounded with a shootout win against Baylor, 56–50. However, the 50 points allowed to Baylor were the most by a Texas team in history, and the 106 combined points scored by both teams were the most in any Texas game since 1950. The following week featured an away game against Kansas, a team that had lost six consecutive games since playing against South Dakota State. However, Texas had to rely on a touchdown pass from backup quarterback Case McCoy to tight end D.J. Grant with only 17 seconds of regulation remaining, before winning 21–17. In the season's final rivalry game, the annual Chancellor's Spurs against Texas Tech, Texas won 31–22. Texas' next game was a 33–7 win against Iowa State. The game featured an offensive wishbone formation play to begin the game, in honor of former Texas coach Darrell Royal, who died just prior to the game. The play would result in a 47-yard pass play from David Ash to tight end Greg Daniels. The win would be the final win of the regular season for the Texas Longhorns.

Following a second and final bye week, Texas faced recently joined Big 12 member TCU on Thanksgiving. Prior to 2012, Texas annually played against Texas A&M on Thanksgiving in the Lone Star Showdown, but ended after Texas A&M joined the SEC. Texas would lose the homecoming game, 13–20. Texas' final regular season and Big 12 Conference game was against No. 6 Kansas State. Texas lost the game 24–42. Notably, Kansas State scored 35 points in the second half of the game alone. Kansas State would be the eventual 2012 Big 12 Champion.

The Texas Longhorns finished the regular season with eight wins and four losses, matching the previous season's win total for the entire season, including the win against California in the Holiday Bowl. Texas also recorded a 5–4 conference record, which placed third in the Big 12, an increase of three places from 2011. In addition, Texas finished unranked in both the AP Poll and Coaches' Poll, but remained ranked No. 23 in the BCS Rankings.

=== Oregon State ===
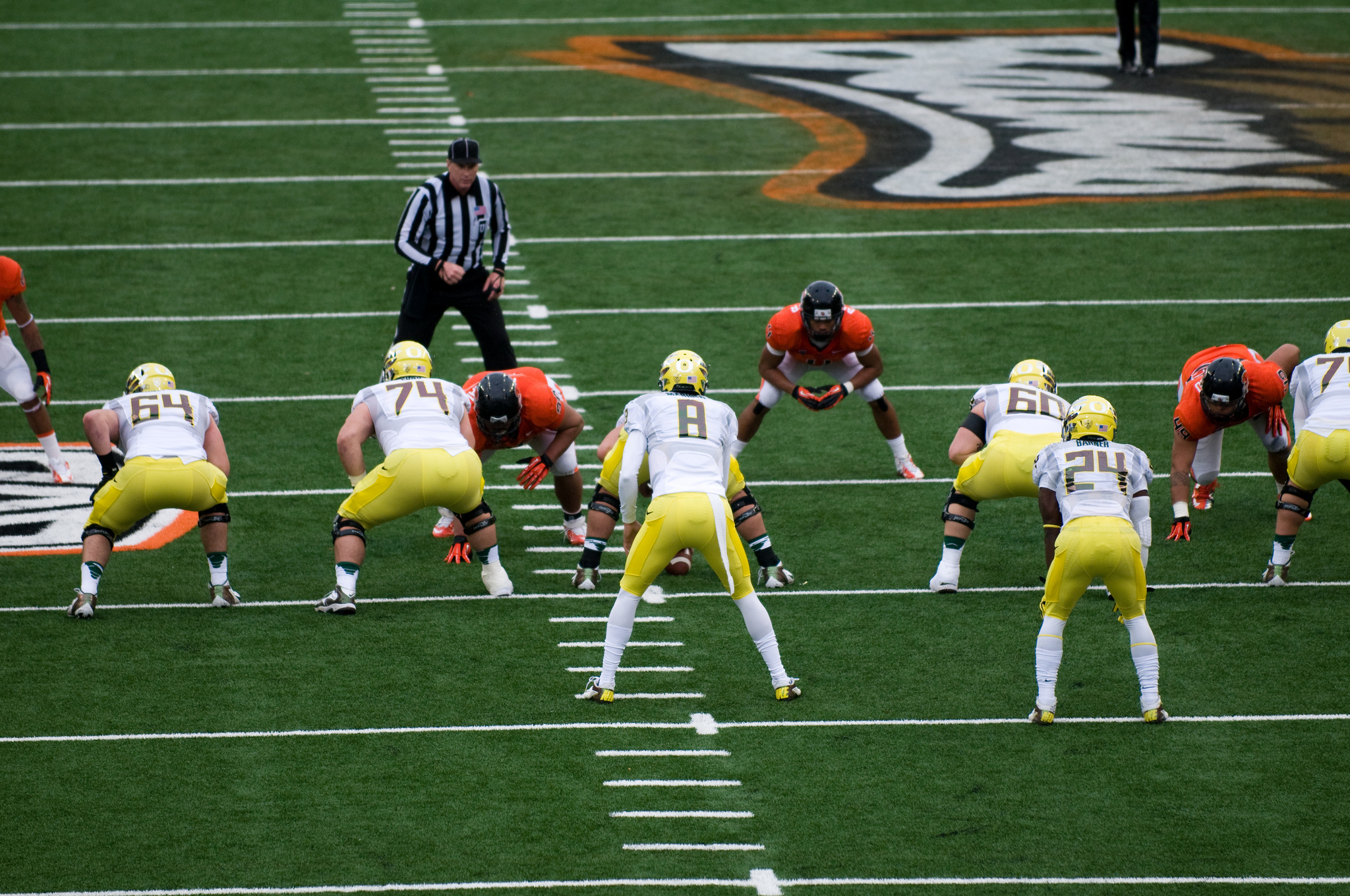
Oregon State's defense lines up against Oregon; Oregon State would lose the game 24–48

Oregon States has a 2–0 record in bowl games played in the State of Texas (2–0 in Sun Bowl). The 2012 team has the school's best points per game record averaging 33.0 points per game. Its scoring defense ranks 22nd in FBS allowing 19.75 points per game, while its rushing defense ranks 28th allowing 130.5 yards per game. The Beavers led the Pac-12 for red zone efficiency at 90.6 percent (48–53).

Under the school's winningest head coach Mike Riley (81 victories), All-America senior cornerback Jordan Poyer led the Pac-12 with seven interceptions and was second in FBS with 0.64 interceptions per game. During the season, wide receiver Markus Wheaton set a career reception record with 224 catches. Wheaton had 88 passes for 1,207 yards. Sophomore wide receiver Brandin Cooks had 64 receptions for 1,120 yards. At the end of the season Wheaton was 11th (100.6 ypg) and Cooks was 21st (93.3 ypg) in the nation.

== Game summary ==
=== Scoring summary ===
Scoring summary

Quarter	Time	Drive			Team	Scoring information	Score	
Quarter	Time	Plays	Yards	TOP	Team	Scoring information	UT	OSU
1	09:12	5	25	01:17	OSU	29-yard field goal by Trevor Romaine	0	3
1	06:46	3	3	01:07	TEX	40-yard field goal by Nick Jordan	3	3
1	01:33	12	75	05:12	OSU	Storm Woods 12-yard touchdown run, Trevor Romaine kick good	3	10
2	14:40	4	75	01:53	UT	Marquise Goodwin 64-yard touchdown run, Nick Jordan kick good	10	10
2	09:20	12	58	05:20	OSU	37-yard field goal by Trevor Romaine	10	13
2	03:46	5	47	02:09	OSU	Terron Ward 9-yard touchdown run, Trevor Romaine kick good	10	20
3	05:17	9	46	08:34	UT	David Ash 11-yard touchdown run, Nick Jordan kick good	17	20
3	00:09	5	42	02:28	OSU	Storm Woods 2-yard touchdown run, Trevor Romaine kick good	17	27
4	08:18	9	83	03:06	UT	Johnathan Gray 15-yard touchdown reception from David Ash, Nick Jordan kick good	24	27
4	02:24	5	48	02:11	UT	Marquise Goodwin 36-yard touchdown reception from David Ash, Nick Jordan kick good	31	27
"TOP" = time of possession. For other American football terms, see Glossary of American football.							31	27

== Final statistics ==
Statistical comparison
	UT	OSU
1st downs	16	21
Total yards	358	297
Passing yards	241	194
Rushing yards	117	103
Penalties	9–78	2–10
3rd down conversions	5–16	3–11
4th down conversions	1–2	0–2
Turnovers	1	3
Time of possession	29:02	30:58

== See also ==
- Glossary of American football
- American football positions
