= Case McCoy =

American football player (born 1991)

No. 6
- Position: Quarterback

Personal information
- Born: July 15, 1991 (age 35); Abilene, Texas, U.S.
- Listed height: 6 ft 2 in (1.88 m)
- Listed weight: 200 lb (91 kg)

Career information
- High school: Graham (Graham, Texas)
- College: Texas (2010–2013)

Awards and highlights
- 3× Academic All-Big 12 (2011–2013)
- Stats at ESPN

Casey Burl McCoy (born July 15, 1991) is an American former football quarterback for the Texas Longhorns. He started 16 games for Texas over a three-year period, amassing a 9–7 record. He is the younger brother of NFL quarterback Colt McCoy.

== Early life ==
McCoy attended Graham High School where he was coached by his father Brad McCoy. He was a prep All-American, two-time all-state and three-time first-team all-district performer at quarterback who played in the 2010 Offense-Defense All-American Bowl. He graduated with the 5th most passing yards in Texas High School history (10,475) and the 3rd most attempts (1,245). He was the 35th-best quarterback prospect coming out of school as ranked by ESPNU. He was also a three-year letterman in basketball, a two-year letterman in track and field and a first-team all-district selection in basketball as a junior.

== College career ==
=== 2011 season ===
After seeing sparse play in his freshman season, McCoy competed with Garrett Gilbert and David Ash for the starting role at quarterback during the 2011 season. After Gilbert struggled against BYU, McCoy and Ash replaced him and McCoy led the team to victory on a game-winning drive. For the next three weeks, McCoy split starting duties with Ash, but after struggling against Oklahoma, he lost the starting job to Ash. He was brought in late to the Missouri and the Kansas State games when coach Mack Brown was looking for a spark, and almost led a comeback against Kansas State. As a result, he was named starter for the Texas A&M game. This would be the last scheduled meeting between the two in-state rivals before Texas A&M left the Big 12 for the Southeastern Conference and A&M's last Big 12 game ever. Texas A&M was favored by 8 points, and led by 9 at halftime, but after Texas took the lead in the 3rd quarter and lost it in the 4th, McCoy did just enough – including a 25-yard run – to set up a game-winning field goal. Nonetheless, a poor performance the following week in a loss to Baylor, as well as strong practices by Ash, led to Ash starting the 2011 Holiday Bowl game and McCoy not playing in it at all. In 2011 McCoy managed to set the school record for most consecutive passes to start a career without an interception with 124.

=== 2012 season ===
With Ash having emerged as the starter, McCoy started only one game all season, a losing effort against Kansas State. But earlier in the year, he came in during the 4th quarter of the Kansas game to replace an ineffective Ash and led a game-winning 68 yard drive, capped by a 1-yard touchdown pass to D.J. Grant with 12 seconds left. He also came off the bench against TCU.

=== 2013 season ===
McCoy again entered the season as the backup to David Ash, but because of a pair of concussions that Ash suffered in two of the first four games, McCoy wound up starting all but three games. After Ash's second injury, McCoy helped lead Texas to 6 straight wins, including an improbable upset of #12 Oklahoma in the Red River Rivalry. In that game McCoy completed 13 of 21 passes for 190 yards with an interception and two touchdowns. Despite early non-conference losses and a one-sided loss to Oklahoma State, McCoy led Texas to a #24 ranking and a season ending game that was a de facto conference championship game against Baylor. Texas lost to Baylor after McCoy struggled to complete 12 of 34 passes for 54 yards, threw two interceptions and only one touchdown.

McCoy's final game was the 2013 Alamo Bowl game against Oregon. He threw two interceptions for touchdowns, scored on a 1-yard rush in the first quarter for Texas' only touchdown, finished 8 of 17 for 48 yards and was pulled at times in the second half for freshman Tyrone Swoopes. Oregon won 30–7.

He finished his career ranked 10th in school history in career passing yards (3,689) and 10th in touchdown passes (24) and led five career fourth quarter comebacks.

== Personal life ==
McCoy is brother of Colt McCoy, who also played quarterback at Texas and won several awards during the 2009 season before playing in the NFL. As a child, McCoy had a rare form of scleroderma, a disease that tightens and hardens skin and connective tissues and he spent a year treating it. The results are still visible on him.

After graduating from Texas, McCoy went to work with HPI Corporate Services in Austin as a tenant broker specialist.
