= Zach Maynard =

American football player (born 1989)

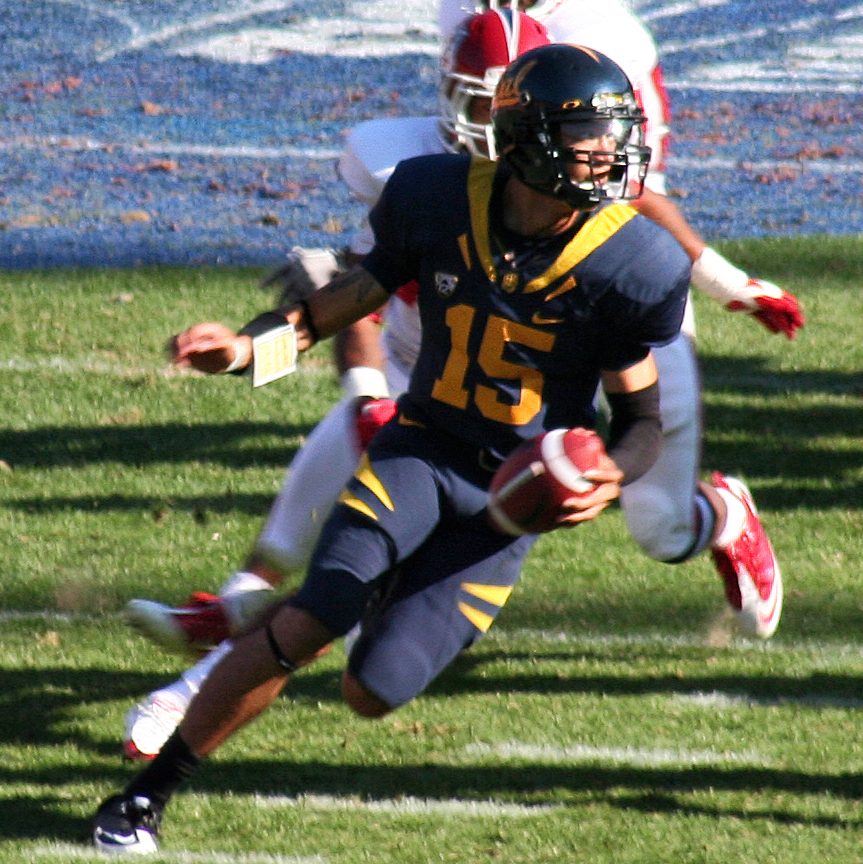
- Maynard in 2011

No. 15
- Position: Quarterback

Personal information
- Born: July 29, 1989 (age 37); Greensboro, North Carolina, U.S.
- Listed height: 6 ft 2 in (1.88 m)
- Listed weight: 185 lb (84 kg)

Career information
- High school: Grimsley (Greensboro)
- College: Buffalo (2008–2009); California (2010–2012)
- Stats at ESPN

Zachary Desmond Maynard (born July 29, 1989) is an American former college football player who was a quarterback for the Buffalo Bulls and California Golden Bears. He is the older half-brother of current San Francisco 49ers wide receiver Keenan Allen.

== Early life ==
Maynard attended Grimsley High School in Greensboro, North Carolina, where he led his team to a Metro League title as a senior in 2007. He committed to the University at Buffalo to play for coach Turner Gill.

== College career ==
=== Buffalo ===
Maynard began his college career with the Bulls as the backup quarterback to Drew Willy, and saw limited action during the 2008 season, culminating with the team's 2008 MAC championship, and an appearance in the 2009 International Bowl. For the 2009 season, Maynard took over for Willy as the team's starting quarterback and led the Bulls to a 5–7 record. During a 54–27 loss to Pittsburgh in the second week of the season, Maynard threw for 400 yards and 4 touchdowns. During the 2009 season, Maynard accounted for 2,994 yards of total offense, the second highest single-season total in Buffalo football history.

=== California ===
In January 2010, after Jeff Quinn replaced Turner Gill as Buffalo coach, Maynard transferred to the University of California, Berkeley, to play for coach Jeff Tedford. The move reunited him with his younger half-brother, Keenan Allen, who had committed to the Golden Bears to play wide receiver. After sitting out the 2010 season per NCAA transfer rules, Maynard won the starting job at Cal for the 2011 season. Maynard's 2,990 passing yards in 2011 were the third-highest single-season total in Cal history, as he led the Golden Bears to a 7–6 record and an appearance in the 2011 Holiday Bowl. During the 2012 season, Maynard started nine games before an injury suffered in a game against Washington prematurely ended his season, as California slumped to a 3–9 record in what would prove to be Tedford's final season as coach of the Golden Bears.

=== College statistics ===
Year	Team	Passing							Rushing			
Year	Team	Comp	Att	Pct	Yds	Y/A	TD	Int	Att	Yds	Avg	TD
2008	Buffalo	1	3	33.3	7	2.3	0	0	8	56	7.0	0
2009	Buffalo	218	379	57.5	2,694	7.1	18	15	87	300	3.4	1
2011	California	231	405	57.0	2,990	7.4	17	12	84	108	1.3	4
2012	California	180	296	60.8	2,214	7.5	12	10	98	32	0.3	3
Career		630	1,081	58.3	7,905	7.3	47	37	277	496	1.8	8
