= 2011 California Golden Bears football team =

American college football season

2011 California Golden Bears football

Holiday Bowl, L 10–21 vs. Texas
- Conference: Pac-12 Conference
- North Division
- Record: 7–6 (4–5 Pac-12)
- Head coach: Jeff Tedford (10th season)
- Offensive coordinator: Jim Michalczik (2nd season)
- Offensive scheme: Pro-style
- Defensive coordinator: Clancy Pendergast (2nd season)
- Base defense: 3–4
- Home stadium: AT&T Park

2011 Pac-12 Conference football standings
	Conf.			Overall
Team	W		L	W		L
North Division
No. 4 Oregon xy$	8	–	1	12	–	2
No. 7 Stanford x%	8	–	1	11	–	2
Washington	5	–	4	7	–	6
California	4	–	5	7	–	6
Oregon State	3	–	6	3	–	9
Washington State	2	–	7	4	–	8
South Division
No. 6 USC †	7	–	2	10	–	2
UCLA xy	5	–	4	6	–	8
Utah	4	–	5	8	–	5
Arizona State	4	–	5	6	–	7
Arizona	2	–	7	4	–	8
Colorado	2	–	7	3	–	10
Championship: Oregon 49, UCLA 31
$ – BCS representative as conference champion; % – BCS at-large representative; x – Division champion/co-champions; y – Championship game participant; † – USC ineligible for championship and postseason due to NCAA sanctions; Rankings from AP Poll

The 2011 California Golden Bears football team represented the University of California, Berkeley in the 2011 NCAA Division I FBS football season. Led by tenth-year head coach Jeff Tedford, the Bears are members of the North Division of the Pac-12 Conference.

Due to reconstruction at California Memorial Stadium, California played their home games in AT&T Park, now known as Oracle Park, in San Francisco, California. The season opener against Fresno State, officially a neutral-site game, was played at Candlestick Park. The regular season also ended with an away game with a matchup at Arizona State on November 25.

Following the team's first losing season during Tedford's tenure as head coach, the Golden Bears improved to 7–5 (4–5 in the Pac-12) to finish fourth in the North Division. Cal also became bowl-eligible for the first time since 2009 and accepted a bid to play in the Holiday Bowl, which they lost to Texas. With a victory against Presbyterian College on September 17, Tedford became the winningest coach in program history.

== Preseason ==
Following the program's first losing season during Jeff Tedford's tenure as head coach, several coaching changes were implemented. Offensive coordinator Andy Ludwig departed for the same position at San Diego State. He was replaced by Jim Michalczik, who will also be the offensive line coach due to the departure of Steve Marshall for Colorado. Michalczik had previously been the offensive line coach at Cal from 2002–2008. Wide receivers coach Kevin Daft was succeeded by Eric Kiesau, who will also function as the passing game coordinator, while defensive backs coach Al Simmons was succeeded by Ashley Ambrose, who held the same position at Colorado. Marcus Arroyo joined the coaching staff as quarterbacks coach and assistant head coach.

Starting running back Shane Vereen, who finished the 2010 season with 1,167 yards to become the program's first 1,000-yard rusher since the 2008 season, decided to forego a remaining season of eligibility and enter the NFL draft, having graduated in December. He was drafted in the second round by the New England Patriots, following defensive end Cameron Jordan, who was drafted in the first round. Safety Chris Conte was selected in the third round by the Chicago Bears, and linebacker Mike Mohamed was picked in the sixth round by the Denver Broncos.

The team held its spring football from March 15 to April 24. Junior transfer Zach Maynard, the half brother of wide receiver Keenan Allen, was named the starting quarterback on May 14. Maynard had played at Buffalo from 2008–2009 before transferring to Cal in 2010.

== Schedule ==
Date	Time	Opponent	Site	TV	Result	Attendance	Source
September 3	4:00 p.m.	vs. Fresno State*	Candlestick Park; San Francisco, CA (TicketCity Battle by the Bay)	CSNCA	W 36–21	34,563	
September 10	12:30 p.m.	at Colorado*	Folsom Field; Boulder, CO	FCS Pacific	W 36–33 ^{OT}	49,532	
September 17	2:30 p.m.	Presbyterian*	AT&T Park; San Francisco, CA		W 63–12	33,952	
September 24	12:30 p.m.	at Washington	Husky Stadium; Seattle, WA	FSN	L 23–31	60,437	
October 6	6:00 p.m.	at No. 9 Oregon	Autzen Stadium; Eugene, OR	ESPN	L 15–43	58,796	
October 13	6:00 p.m.	USC^{†}	AT&T Park; San Francisco, CA	ESPN	L 9–30	44,043	
October 22	4:00 p.m.	Utah	AT&T Park; San Francisco, CA	CSNBA	W 34–10	35,182	
October 29	4:00 p.m.	at UCLA	Rose Bowl; Pasadena, CA (rivalry)	CSNBA	L 14–31	55,604	
November 5	3:30 p.m.	Washington State	AT&T Park; San Francisco, CA	CSNCA	W 30–7	35,506	
November 12	3:30 p.m.	Oregon State	AT&T Park; San Francisco, CA	CSNCA	W 23–6	39,602	
November 19	7:15 p.m.	at No. 8 Stanford	Stanford Stadium; Stanford, CA (Big Game)	ESPN	L 28–31	50,360	
November 25	7:15 p.m.	at Arizona State	Sun Devil Stadium; Tempe, AZ	ESPN	W 47–38	52,350	
December 28	5:00 p.m.	vs. Texas*	Qualcomm Stadium; San Diego, CA (Holiday Bowl)	ESPN	L 10–21	56,313	
*Non-conference game; ^{†}Homecoming; Rankings from AP Poll released prior to the game; All times are in Pacific time

The Colorado game on September 10 was designated as non-conference

== Game summaries ==
=== Fresno State ===
California vs. Fresno State

Team	1	2	3	4	Total
Fresno State	7	7	0	7	21
• California	19	0	14	3	36

- Date: September 3
- Location: Candlestick Park, San Francisco, CA
- Game start: 7:00 p.m. EST

Scoring summary
1	13:16	FRES	Robbie Rouse 9-yard run (Kevin Goessling kick)	FRES 7–0
1	8:24	CAL	Isi Sofele 1-yard run (kick blocked)	FRES 7–6
1	5:45	CAL	Isi Sofele 39-yard run (kick blocked)	CAL 12–7
1	1:31	CAL	Marvin Jones 42-yard pass from Zach Maynard (Giorgio Tavecchio kick)	CAL 19–7
2	4:16	FRES	Curtis Wilson recovered fumble in end zone (Kevin Goessling kick)	CAL 19–14
3	9:17	CAL	Marvin Jones 23-yard pass from Zach Maynard (Giorgio Tavecchio kick)	CAL 26–14
3	4:21	CAL	Trevor Guyton 19-yard fumble return (Giorgio Tavecchio kick)	CAL 33–14
4	8:16	CAL	Giorgio Tavecchio 40-yard field goal	CAL 36–14
4	3:29	FRES	Josh Harper 7-yard pass from Derek Carr (Kevin Goessling kick)	CAL 36–21

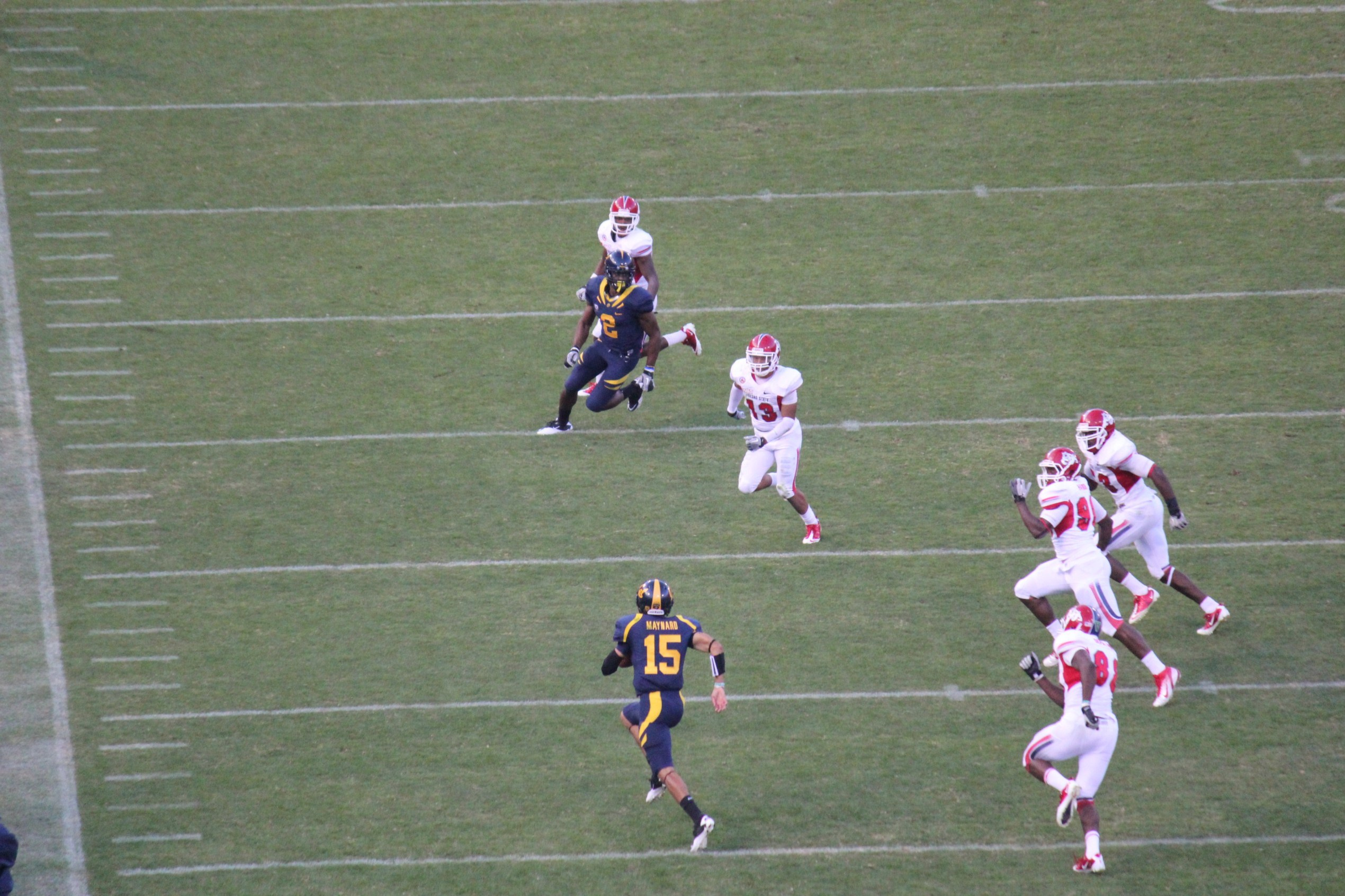
Zach Maynard scrambles for 19 yards in his first Cal start.

The third meeting between Cal and Fresno State was a neutral-site game played at Candlestick Park in San Francisco. It saw both quarterbacks each start their first career games for their respective teams: Cal's Zach Maynard had transferred from Buffalo in 2010, while Fresno State's Derek Carr had redshirted the previous season. On the opening drive Maynard's first pass was intercepted on the Cal 16-yard line and Fresno State was able to score first on a 9-yard run by running back Robbie Rouse. However, the Bears were able to rebound. Their second possession saw a 67-yard scoring drive put together which was capped off with a 1-yard touchdown run by running back Isi Sofele, although the PAT was blocked. On their third possession of the game, Sofele was able to break free for a 39-yard run, but the PAT was blocked again. The Bears scored for a third time on their fourth possession when Maynard connected with wide receiver Marvin Jones for a 42-yard score. The Bulldogs had a chance to add some points at the beginning of the second quarter, but a 35-yard field goal missed. The Fresno State defense was able to keep Cal scoreless, and with Cal backed up on its own 6-yard line, were able to capitalize on a botched snap that Sofele tried to recover in the Cal end zone, but was knocked lose for a fumble and recovered by the Bulldogs for a touchdown. This trimmed Cal's lead to 19–14 at the half.

On Cal's first possession of the third quarter, Maynard was able to hit Jones for a second touchdown, this one for 23 yards. Carr was intercepted on the ensuing possession, but the Bears were unable to convert it into points. However, the Cal defense was then able to sack Carr and force a fumble, which was returned for a 22-yard score. The Bears' final score of the game came on a 40-yard field goal in the fourth quarter, while the Bulldogs were able to put together a drive that ended with a 7-yard touchdown pass from Carr to receiver Josh Harper for the game's final score.

In his first start for the Bears, Zach Maynard passed for 266 yards, with two touchdowns and an interception, while running for 53 yards. Starting running back Isi Sofele scored the second rushing touchdown of his career and rushed for 83 total yards. Keenan Allen had 112 yards receiving, while Marvin Jones had 118, with two touchdowns, marking the first time two Cal receivers had 100 yards in a game since 2006. For Fresno State, Derek Carr passed for 142 yards, a touchdown and an interception, while Robbie Rouse had 86 rushing yards, with a touchdown.

=== Colorado ===
Team	1	2	3	4	OT	Total
• California	0	16	7	7	6	36
Colorado	3	3	14	10	3	33

- Date: September 10
- Location: Folsom Field, Boulder, CO
- Game start: 3:30 p.m. EST

Scoring summary
1	2:51	COL	Will Oliver 47-yard field goal	COL 3–0
2	14:14	CAL	Nico Dumont 2-yard pass from Zach Maynard (kick blocked)	CAL 6–3
2	9:21	CAL	Giorgio Tavecchio 39-yard field goal	CAL 9–3
2	4:18	COL	Will Oliver 52-yard field goal	CAL 9–6
2	1:13	CAL	Anthony Miller 7-yard pass from Zach Maynard (Giorgio Tavecchio kick)	CAL 16–6
3	10:30	COL	Ryan Deehan 37-yard pass from Tyler Hansen (Will Oliver kick)	CAL 16–13
3	4:28	CAL	Anthony Miller 20-yard pass from Zach Maynard (Giorgio Tavecchio kick)	CAL 23–13
3	1:41	COL	Paul Richardson 65-yard pass from Tyler Hansen (Will Oliver kick)	CAL 23–20
4	14:48	COL	Paul Richardson 78-yard pass from Tyler Hansen (Will Oliver kick)	COL 27–23
4	9:55	CAL	C.J. Anderson 19-yard run (Giorgio Tavecchio kick)	CAL 30–27
4	0:30	COL	Will Oliver 32-yard field goal	Tied 30–30
OT		COL	Will Oliver 22-yard field goal	COL 33–30
OT		CAL	Keenan Allen 5-yard pass from Zach Maynard (no kick)	CAL 36–33

Although both teams were in the Pac-12, this game counted as a non-conference game in Pac-12 standings, as it was scheduled before Colorado joined the Pac-12. The Bears visited Boulder for the first time since 1982, where they were shut out during the first quarter by the Buffaloes. Zach Maynard was intercepted on Cal's second possession of the game to set up a Colorado 27-yard field goal. However Cal got on the board to open the second quarter on a 2-yard pass from Maynard to fullback Nico Dumont, although a PAT was blocked for the second week in a row. After both teams traded field goals, Cal added to its lead on a 7-yard pass from Maynard to tight end Anthony Miller to make it 16–6 at the half.

Colorado started out the second half with a 37-yard pass from Tyler Hansen to tight end Ryan Deehan. Late in the quarter Cal scored on a 20-yard reception by Miller. The Buffs responded with a 66-yard touchdown from Hansen to receiver Paul Richardson to close the third quarter. The two connected again when Richardson opened the fourth quarter for a 78-yard score to give Colorado their first lead of the game. However Cal regained the lead on the ensuing possession on a 20-yard run by running back C.J. Anderson. The Buffs were able to tie the game on a 32-yard field goal with 30 seconds left to force overtime.

Cal won the coin toss and elected to play defense to start overtime. Colorado drove to the 4-yard line before settling for a 22-yard field goal. After reaching a first down at the 15-yard line, Cal was pushed back to the 35-yard line by two penalties, setting up a 1st-and-30 situation. However, on first down Maynard connected with Keenan Allen for a 32-yard gain to the 3-yard line. One play later, Maynard passed to Allen for a 5-yard touchdown to give the Bears their first overtime win since 2006. The victory tied head coach Jeff Tedford with Andy Smith for the most in school history with 74.

Zach Maynard passed for 243 yards, four touchdowns, and an interception, Isi Sofele had 84 yards on the ground, while Keenan Allen had 97 receiving yards and a touchdown. Colorado's Tyler Hansen threw for 474 yards, a team record, including three touchdowns, while Paul Richardson had 284 receiving yards, a school record. The Buffs offense outgained the Bears 582–370 in the loss.

=== Presbyterian ===
Team	1	2	3	4	Total
Presbyterian	0	13	0	0	13
• California	14	28	21	0	63

- Date: September 17
- Location: AT&T Park, San Francisco, CA
- Game start: 2:36 p.m. PST
- Elapsed time: 3:07
- Game attendance: 33,952
- Game weather: Clear, 64 F, wind 6 NW
- Referee: Jay Stricherz

Scoring summary
1	5:56	CAL	C.J. Anderson 9-yard run (Giorgio Tavecchio kick)	CAL 7–0
1	4:23	CAL	Isi Sofele 1-yard run (Giorgio Tavecchio kick)	CAL 14–0
2	13:24	CAL	Isi Sofele 3-yard run (Giorgio Tavecchio kick)	CAL 21–0
2	12:08	CAL	Marvin Jones 51-yard pass from Zach Maynard (Giorgio Tavecchio kick)	CAL 28–0
2	7:28	PRE	Justin Bethel 17-yard blocked field goal return (kick failed)	CAL 28–6
2	5:48	CAL	Spencer Hagen 16-yard pass from Zach Maynard (Giorgio Tavecchio kick)	CAL 35–6
2	3:03	PRE	Justin Bethel 29-yard interception return (pass failed)	CAL 35–12
2	1:22	CAL	Keenan Allen 21-yard pass from Zach Maynard (Giorgio Tavecchio kick)	CAL 42–12
3	14:48	CAL	Brendan Bigelow 88-yard kickoff return (Giorgio Tavecchio kick)	CAL 49–12
3	7:50	CAL	Covaughn DeBoskie-Johnson 6-yard run (Giorgio Tavecchio kick)	CAL 56–12
3	0:39	CAL	Dasarte Yarnway 7-yard run (Giorgio Tavecchio kick)	CAL 63–12

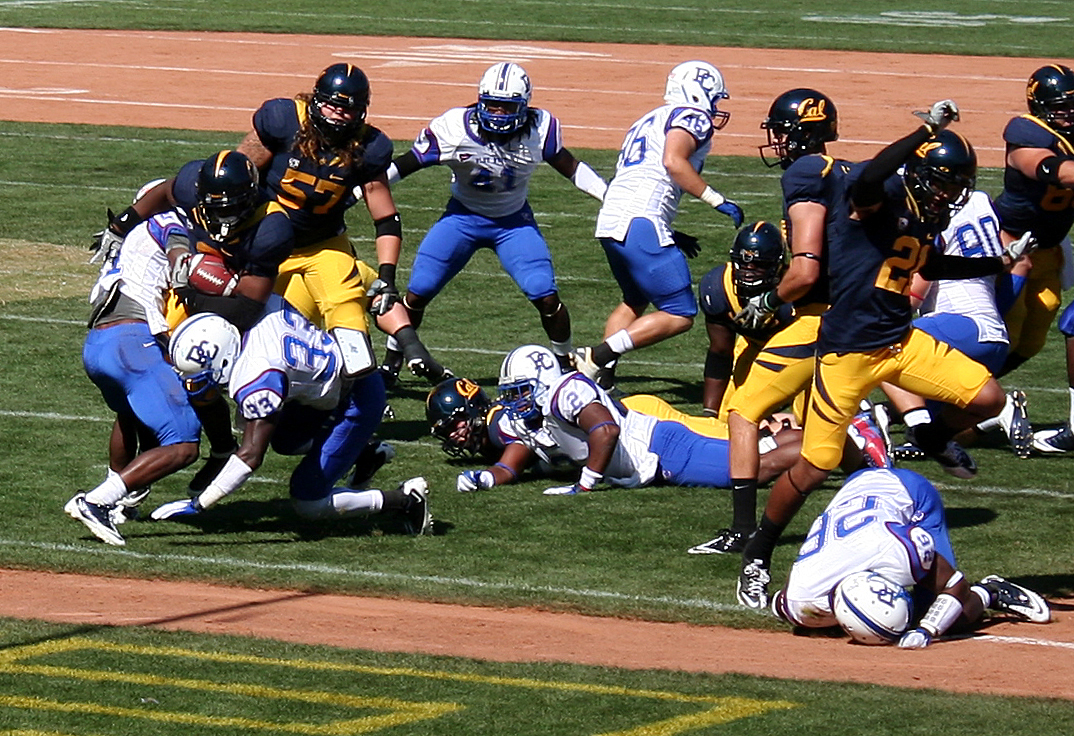
The Cal offense against Presbyterian

Cal's home opener was the first matchup for the two teams, with Presbyterian making the longest trip for an away game in school history. The Bears' first score of the game came on a 9-yard run by running back C. J. Anderson, followed by a 1-yard run by Isi Sofele that was set up by an interception of Ryan Singer. Sofele opened the second quarter with a 3-yard run, and the Bears scored on the following possession with a 51-yard reception by Marvin Jones. The Blue Hose got on the scoreboard when cornerback Justin Bethel blocked a punt and returned it for a touchdown, with the PAT missing. After Cal tight end Spencer Hagan scored on a 16-yard reception, Presbyterian's second score came on a 29-yard interception return by Bethel, with the two-point conversion missing. The final score of the half came on a 21-yard reception by Keenan Allen to make it 42–12 at the half.

The second half opened with an 88-yard kickoff return for a score by Cal running back Brendan Bigelow. Backup running backs Covaughn DeBoskie-Johnson and Dasarte Yarnway rushed for 6 and 7-yard touchdowns, respectively, for Cal's final scores. The victory made Cal head coach Jeff Tedford the winningest in program history with 75 wins. Zach Maynard threw for 215 yards, with three touchdowns and an interception, Marvin Jones had 123 receiving yards with a score, while Isi Sofele had his first 100-yard rushing game with 105 and two scores. Cal outgained Presbyterian with 581 yards of total offense to 48, and controlled the ball for two thirds of the game.

=== Washington ===
Team	1	2	3	4	Total
California	7	13	3	0	23
• Washington	14	7	3	7	31

- Date: September 24
- Location: Husky Stadium, Seattle, WA

In the conference opener for both teams, Cal faced Washington in Seattle, not having defeated the Huskies since 2008. On the Bears' opening possession Zach Maynard connected with receiver Keenan Allen for a 90-yard score, the longest reception in school history. Washington responded on the ensuing possession on a 20-yard touchdown reception by tight end Austin Seferian-Jenkins from Keith Price. The Huskies scored again on a 2-yard run by running back Chris Polk to take the lead, which they never relinquished. After the Bears opened the second quarter with a 29-yard field goal, the Huskies scored their third straight touchdown with a 20-yard reception by Seferian-Jenkins. After Cal scored with a 36-yard field goal, a fumble by Price was recovered by the Bears. This set up a 1-yard score by running back C.J. Anderson for the final points of the half. A 52-yard field goal attempt by Washington's Erik Folk missed to close out the half, with the Huskies leading 21–20.

Cal's final points of the game came on a 25-yard field goal, with Washington responding with a 40-yard field goal. The Huskies padded their lead with a 70-yard reception by Chris Polk to open the fourth quarter. Early in the quarter Cal was unable to capitalize on a fumble recovery and turned the ball over on downs. The Bears had a chance in the final minutes of the game and were able to drive to the Huskies' 2-yard line, but were unable to get the ball into the end zone, making Steve Sarkisian's record against Cal 3–0.

Zach Maynard passed for 349 yards and a touchdown, the first time a Cal quarterback had passed for 300 yards since October 2009. Keenan Allen had a career-high 197 yards with a score, while Isi Sofele had 98 yards on the ground. Keith Price threw for 292 yards with three touchdowns, while Chris Polk was the Huskies' leading receiver and rusher, with 85 and 60 yards, respectively, scoring both through the air and on the ground.

=== Oregon ===
Team	1	2	3	4	Total
California	6	9	0	0	15
• Oregon	14	0	22	7	43

- Date: October 6
- Location: Autzen Stadium, Eugene, OR

Both teams came off a bye week as Cal traveled north to #9 Oregon. The Bears scored on the game's opening drive with a 27-yard field goal, but the Ducks came right back with a 53-yard scoring run by running back LaMichael James. Cal scored again on the ensuing possession with a 38-yard field goal, with Oregon adding its final score of the half on a 17-yard run by receiver De'Anthony Thomas late in the quarter. The Cal defense was able to hold Oregon scoreless in the second quarter, while a 54-yard field goal, a career-high for kicker Giorgio Tavecchio, and a 12-yard touchdown reception by receiver Keenan Allen gave the Bears the lead 15–14. Darron Thomas was intercepted in Cal territory in the closing minutes of the half for the game's sole turnover, but the Bears were unable to add to their lead when a 40-yard field goal attempt was blocked.

However, the second half was a different story, as Oregon shut out Cal and took control of the game. The Ducks scored three touchdowns in the third quarter, with a 23-yard reception by Thomas, a 68-yard run by running back Kenjon Barner (with a successful 2-point conversion), and a 21-yard reception by Thomas, his third touchdown of the game. The final score of the game came on a 3-yard touchdown by receiver Lavasier Tuinei early in the fourth quarter. Backup Allan Bridgford stepped in for Zach Maynard during the quarter, but the Bears failed to put up further points on the board despite putting together a drive that went down to the Oregon goal line on Bridgford's first series.

Zach Maynard threw for 218 yards and a touchdown, while Allan Bridgford had 103 passing yards in relief. Isi Sofele had 119 yards on the ground, while Keenan Allen had 170 through the air and the Bears' sole touchdown. Oregon's Darron Thomas threw for 198 yards, with three touchdowns and an interception, while De'Anthony Thomas had 114 receiving yards, two touchdown receptions, and a rushing touchdown. LaMichael James, the nation's leading rusher, finished with 239 yards, which put him over the 4,000 mark for his career. The game was his fourth straight with at least 200 yards rushing, a feat unparalleled in school history. However, he was injured early in the fourth quarter and had to be carted off the field.

=== USC ===
Team	1	2	3	4	Total
• USC	3	17	3	7	30
California	0	0	9	0	9

- Date: October 13
- Location: AT&T Park, San Francisco, CA

The Bears returned home to AT&T Park in search of their first conference win against the Trojans, whom they had not beaten since 2003. On the fourth play of the game a Keenan Allen fumble was recovered by the Trojans, but they were unable to convert it into points, when a trick play called by USC head coach Lane Kiffin on fourth down at the Cal 8-yard line resulted in a fumble that Cal recovered. A second Cal fumble was recovered by the Trojans when Zach Maynard was sacked in Cal territory, setting up a 39-yard field goal. USC scored three times in the second quarter, first on a 39-yard pass by Matt Barkley to receiver Marqise Lee. Maynard was then intercepted on the Cal 23 on the ensuing possession to set up a 29-yard field goal, and receiver Brandon Carswell had a 7-yard reception late in the quarter. The Bears were able to drive downfield in the final minutes of the half but failed to get on the board when Maynard was intercepted at the goal line. USC led 20–0 at the half, with Cal being shut out for four straight quarters going back to the previous week against Oregon.

USC opened the second half with a 23-yard field goal and Cal ended the shutout with a 27-yard field goal. The Bears scored again when Maynard rushed in from 3 yards out, although the PAT was blocked. Maynard threw his third interception late in the fourth quarter to set up a 2-yard scoring run by running back Curtis McNeal. After turning the ball over on downs, Cal recovered a fumble by USC but was unable to score again.

Zach Maynard threw for 294 yards and had a touchdown run, but accounted for four of the Bears' turnovers with three interceptions and a fumble. Keenan Allen had a career-high 160 receiving yards, while Isi Sofele, coming off a breakout game the previous week against Oregon, was held to 44 yards on the ground. Cal committed five turnovers for the first time since November 2008 and went 0–3 in conference play for the first time in Jeff Tedford's tenure as head coach. Matt Barkley threw for 195 yards and two scores while Curtis McNeal led the Trojans on the ground with 86 yards and a score, while Marqise Lee had 81 yards through the air and a touchdown.

=== Utah ===
Team	1	2	3	4	Total
Utah	0	0	0	10	10
• California	0	20	7	7	34

- Date: October 22
- Location: AT&T Park, San Francisco, CA
- Game start: 7:00 p.m. EST

Scoring summary
2	13:42	CAL	Isi Sofele 5-yard run (Giorgio Tavecchio kick)	CAL 7–0
2	9:24	CAL	Giorgio Tavecchio 35-yard field goal	CAL 10–0
2	1:12	CAL	Giorgio Tavecchio 37-yard field goal	CAL 13–0
2	0:27	CAL	Keenan Allen 12-yard pass from Zach Maynard (Giorgio Tavecchio kick)	CAL 20–0
3	8:02	CAL	Zach Maynard 4-yard run (Giorgio Tavecchio kick)	CAL 27–0
4	14:51	CAL	Josh Hill 32-yard interception return (Giorgio Tavecchio kick)	CAL 34–0
4	11:16	UTAH	Coleman Petersen 36-yard field goal	CAL 34–3
4	1:06	UTAH	John White IV 14-yard run (Coleman Petersen kick)	CAL 34–10

The first conference game between the two teams was their first matchup since the 2009 Poinsettia Bowl. After a scoreless first quarter Cal's first points of the game came in the second with a 5-yard scoring run by Isi Sofele. A fumble by Utah quarterback Jon Hays was recovered and resulted in a 35-yard field goal. After the Bears made a 37-yard field goal, Hays was picked off by linebacker Mychal Kendricks which set up a 12-yard touchdown reception by Keenan Allen to make it 20–0 at the half. Quarterback Zach Maynard scored on a 4-yard run in the third quarter, while a second interception of Hays set up a 29-yard field goal attempt which missed. Hays threw his third interception of the game to open the fourth quarter, which was returned by Josh Hill for a 32-yard score. The Utes ended their scoring drought with a 36-yard field goal on the ensuing possession and running back John White had a 14-yard touchdown run in the final minutes.

In an improvement from the previous week, the Bears had no turnovers in their first conference win of the season. Zach Maynard threw for 255 yards, with a touchdown on the ground and through the air, Keenan Allen had 78 receiving yards and a score, while Isi Sofele rushed for 84 yards and a score. Utah's Jon Hay threw for 148 yards with three interceptions, while the Utes were held to 13 net yards on the ground.

=== UCLA ===
Team	1	2	3	4	Total
California	7	0	7	0	14
• UCLA	0	17	0	14	31

- Date: October 29
- Location: Rose Bowl, Pasadena, CA

Cal got on the board first on 1-yard run by Isi Sofele that was set up by a fumble recovered from UCLA quarterback Kevin Prince. The Bruins responded in the second quarter with an 11-yard score by running back Johnathan Franklin and began to take control of the game when Zach Maynard's s first interception of the game set up a 32-yard field goal. Running back Derrick Coleman scored on a 2-yard run to make it 17–7 at the half.

The Bears were able to close the gap in the third quarter with a 1-yard touchdown run by running back C.J. Anderson that was set up by a muffed UCLA punt return, but were unable to tie the game when a 42-yard field goal attempt missed. The fourth quarter saw Coleman score his second touchdown on a 20-yard run, which was set up by an interception of Maynard. He followed this up with a 24-yard scoring run as the result of another interception. Maynard threw a third interception in a row to end any chances of a comeback late in the quarter.

Zach Maynard threw for 199 yards and was intercepted four times, with UCLA safety Tevin McDonald accounting for three picks. Isi Sofele had 73 rushing yards with one score, while Keenan Allen had 83 receiving yards. UCLA snapped a three-game losing streak to Cal, with quarterback Kevin Prince passing for only 92 yards, but rushing for 163 on the ground, double that of running back Derrick Coleman, who rushed for 80 yards and three scores.

=== Washington State ===
Washington State at California

Team	1	2	3	4	Total
Washington State	0	0	0	7	7
• California	13	10	7	0	30

- Date: November 5
- Location: AT&T Park, San Francisco, CA
- Game start: 6:30 p.m. EST

Scoring summary
1	10:57	CAL	Anthony Miller 19-yard pass from Zach Maynard (Giorgio Tavecchio kick)	CAL 7–0
1	1:31	CAL	Isi Sofele 1-yard run (kick blocked)	CAL 13–0
2	5:21	CAL	C.J. Anderson 5-yard run (Giorgio Tavecchio kick)	CAL 20–0
2	0:56	CAL	Giorgio Tavecchio 43-yard field goal	CAL 23–0
3	12:16	CAL	Will Kapp 43-yard run (Giorgio Tavecchio kick)	CAL 30–0
4	13:38	WSU	Rickey Galvin 5-yard run (Andrew Furney kick)	CAL 30–7

Cal faced Washington State at home, who came in with the second ranked passing offense in the Pac-12. On the Bears' first series Zach Maynard connected with tight end Anthony Miller for a 19-yard touchdown. Cal scored again midway through the quarter on a 1-yard run by Isi Sofele, although the PAT was blocked. Washington State had a chance to score some points at the beginning of the second quarter on a 52-yard field goal attempt, but the snap went high and resulted in a 28-yard loss. The Bears were unable to capitalize on this opportunity, but scored on the ensuing possession on a 5-yard run by C.J. Anderson and added a 43-yard field goal to make it 23–0 at the half.

On the opening drive of the third quarter, fullback Will Kapp, son of former Cal quarterback Joe Kapp, was able to break free on 4th and 1 for a 43-yard touchdown, the first of his career. A second Cougars attempt at a field goal, this one from 27 yards, missed. On the following possession, Maynard was pulled from the game after recovering a fumble by Sofele and backup Allan Bridgford stepped in. Washington State recovered a second fumble by Sofele in Cal territory to close the quarter, and was able to end the shutout on a 5-yard run by running back Rickey Galvin.

Zach Maynard finished the game with 118 passing yards and a touchdown, while Isi Sofele had 138 yards on the ground, a career-high, and accounted for a touchdown. Receiver Keenan Allen had 85 receiving yards to put him over the 1,000 mark for the season which he reached in nine games, the fastest in school history. The win put the Bears within a victory of bowl eligibility. Washington State's Marshall Lobbestael passed for 155 yards, receiver Marquess Wilson had 85 yards through the air, and running back Rickey Galvin accounted for 73 yards on the ground and a touchdown.

=== Oregon State ===
Team	1	2	3	4	Total
Oregon State	3	3	0	0	6
• California	7	7	6	3	23

- Date: November 12
- Location: AT&T Park, San Francisco, CA

Scoring summary
1	10:45	OSU	Trevor Romaine 32-yard field goal	OSU 3–0
1	1:02	CAL	Michael Calvin 19-yard pass from Zach Maynard (Giorgio Tavecchio kick)	CAL 7–3
2	1:06	CAL	Zach Maynard 5-yard run (Giorgio Tavecchio kick)	CAL 14–3
2	0:02	OSU	Trevor Romaine 46-yard field goal	CAL 14–6
3	10:01	CAL	Isi Sofele 20-yard run (kick failed)	CAL 20–6
4	2:23	CAL	Giorgio Tavecchio 32-yard field goal	CAL 23–6

Cal's final home game of the season was a matchup against Oregon State, who they had not beaten at home since 1997. The Beavers scored first on the opening drive with a 32-yard field goal and had an opportunity to add to their score when Zach Maynard was picked off on the ensuing possession, but were forced to punt. The Bears responded with a 19-yard strike from Maynard to receiver Michael Calvin to take the lead, which was never relinquished. They added to the lead on a nine-minute scoring drive in the second quarter that was capped off by a 5-yard run by Maynard. With a minute left in the half, Oregon State was able to drive down the field and kick a 46-yard field goal to cut the lead to 14–6.

Isi Sofele scored on a 20-yard run to open the third quarter, although the PAT missed. The Beavers were able to put together a drive that was halted when a pass from Sean Mannion was deflected and intercepted at the Cal 4-yard line. They had another opportunity to score early in the fourth quarter, but this too was stopped by a turnover when a fumble was recovered at the Cal 3-yard line. The final score of the game came on a 32-yard Cal field goal. Mannion was picked off a second time late in the quarter at the Cal 20-yard line.

Zach Maynard threw for 128 yards, with one passing touchdown and a rushing touchdown. Isi Sofele set a new career high with 190 yards rushing and had a touchdown, also going over the 1,000 yard mark for the season. Oregon State's Sean Mannion passed for 247 yards with two interceptions, while the Beavers' ground attack was held to only 27 yards, their second-fewest total of the season. The victory snapped a four-game losing streak to Oregon State going back to 2006 and made Cal bowl-eligible for the eighth time in nine-year after finishing the previous season with a 5–7 record.

=== Stanford ===
Team	1	2	3	4	Total
California	10	3	0	15	28
• Stanford	7	7	14	3	31

- Date: November 19
- Location: Stanford Stadium, Stanford, CA

Cal started out the 114th Big Game by driving into Stanford territory on the first play, but Isi Sofele fumbled the ball away on the second. This set up a 34-yard scoring run by receiver Ty Montgomery. The Bears responded with a 25-yard field goal and after Andrew Luck was intercepted, were able to jump ahead with a 17-yard touchdown reception by Keenan Allen. Cal's final score of the half came early in the second quarter with a 19-yard field goal. Stanford got the go ahead score on a 25-yard touchdown by running back Tyler Gaffney to make it 14–13. A Cardinal 33-yard field goal attempt to close the half missed.

The Cardinal opened the quarter by scoring with a 4-yard reception by tight end Levine Toilolo, followed by a 9-yard touchdown reception by fullback Ryan Hewitt. The Bears were shut out, with Sofele having his second fumble of the game to end the quarter. Cal was able to mount a comeback in the fourth quarter with a 2-yard reception by tight end Spencer Hagan and a successful two-point conversion. A 35-yard field goal by Stanford made it a two score game, and the Bears were able to score again in the closing minutes on a 1-yard run by running back C. J. Anderson. However Stanford recovered the onside kick to retain control of the Stanford Axe and stave off an upset.

Zach Maynard threw for 280 yards and two scores, while Keenan Allen had 97 through the air and a touchdown. Isi Sofele, after two back to back 100-yard rushing games, was limited to 84. Stanford's Andrew Luck passed for 257 yards, two scores, and a pick.

=== Arizona State ===
California at Arizona State

Team	1	2	3	4	Total
• California	17	10	14	6	47
Arizona State	7	21	10	0	38

- Date: November 25
- Location: Sun Devil Stadium, Tempe, AZ
- Game start: 10:15 p.m. EST
- Television network: ESPN

Scoring summary
1	12:26	CAL	Giorgio Tavecchio 48-yard field goal	CAL 3–0
1	7:50	ASU	Cameron Marshall 1-yard run (Alex Garoutte kick)	ASU 7–3
1	5:56	CAL	Isi Sofele 18-yard run (Giorgio Tavecchio kick)	CAL 10–7
1	5:18	CAL	Zach Maynard 16-yard run (Giorgio Tavecchio kick)	CAL 17–7
2	14:54	ASU	Aaron Pflugrad 17-yard pass from Brock Osweiler (Alex Garroute kick)	CAL 17–14
2	4:49	CAL	C.J. Anderson 1-yard run (Giorgio Tavecchio kick)	CAL 24–14
2	2:59	CAL	Giorgio Tavecchio 27-yard field goal	CAL 27–14
2	1:02	ASU	Rashard Ross 35-yard pass from Brock Osweiler (Alex Garroute kick)	CAL 27–21
2	0:33	ASU	Trevor Kohl 4-yard pass from Brock Osweiler (Alex Garroute kick)	ASU 28–27
3	12:15	ASU	Alex Garroute 47-yard field goal	ASU 31–27
3	9:02	CAL	C.J. Anderson 3-yard run (Giorgio Tavecchio kick)	CAL 34–31
3	2:53	CAL	C.J. Anderson 74-yard pass from Zach Maynard (Giorgio Tavecchio kick)	CAL 41–31
3	0:07	ASU	Cameron Marshall 7-yard run (Alex Garroute kick)	CAL 41–38
4	9:08	CAL	Giorgio Tavecchio 19-yard field goal	CAL 44–38
4	3:32	CAL	Giorgio Tavecchio 30-yard field goal	CAL 47–38

Cal's regular season finale came on the road against Arizona State. The Bears scored on their opening drive with a 48-yard field goal. The Sun Devils responded with a 1-yard scoring run by running back Cameron Marshall. Cal came back with an 18-yard touchdown run by Isi Sofele, and capitalized on a fumble recovery with a 16-yard scoring run by Zach Maynard. The second quarter opened with a 17-yard touchdown reception by Arizona State receiver Aaron Pflugrad. After C. J. Anderson scored on a 1-yard run, Sun Devils quarterback Brock Osweiler was intercepted to set up a 27-yard field goal. Osweiler then connected with receiver Rashad Ross for a 35-yard score. Arizona State forced a fumble on the kickoff, setting up a 4-yard touchdown reception by tight end Trevor Kohl to jump ahead 28–27 at the half.

The Sun Devils scored on a 47-yard field goal to start the third quarter, followed by Cal scoring on a 3-yard run by Anderson. He scored again on a 74-yard reception, followed by Arizona State ending the quarter with a 24-yard touchdown run by Marshall. The Bears began the fourth quarter with a 19-yard field goal, followed by one from 30 yards that was set up by a fumble recovery. Osweiler threw his second interception of the game later in the quarter to prevent any attempt at a Sun Devils comeback.

Zach Maynard threw for 237 yards, with one touchdown pass and a touchdown run. Isi Sofele rushed for 145 yards and a score, while C. J. Anderson rushed for two touchdowns and had a scoring reception. Arizona State's Brock Osweiler passed for 264 yards, with three scores and two picks. Rashad Ross had 108 yards through the air and a touchdown, while Cameron Marshall rushed for 157 yards and two touchdowns. The Sun Devils ended their season with a four-game losing streak.

=== Holiday Bowl ===
Team	1	2	3	4	Total
California	3	0	7	0	10
• Texas	0	7	7	7	21

- Date: December 28
- Location: Qualcomm Stadium, San Diego, CA

Cal had last played Texas in 1970, and the Longhorns owned a 4–0 record against the Bears, although this marked their first meeting in a bowl. Cal scored first on a 47-yard field goal, then committed its first turnover of the game when Zach Maynard was intercepted by cornerback Quandre Diggs. Despite a defensive stop, Maynard was sacked on the following possession and fumbled deep in Cal territory. However Texas was unable to capitalize on this when a 38-yard field goal missed. The Longhorns got on the board midway through the second quarter on a trick play that involved receiver Jaxon Shipley throwing a 4-yard touchdown pass to quarterback David Ash to make it 7–3 at the half, the combined score tying a Holiday Bowl record for lowest ever in the first half.

Cal opened the third quarter on a 6-yard scoring run by Isi Sofele to take the lead for one series, as Texas responded with a 47-yard scoring reception by receiver Marquise Goodwin. Sofele then fumbled the ball on ensuing possession, but the Cal defense again held. Maynard was sacked on the final Cal possession of the quarter, resulting in another fumble. A 37-yard run by Goodwin then set up a 4-yard touchdown run by running back Cody Johnson for the game's final score. Late in the quarter the final Cal turnover occurred when receiver Marvin Jones fumbled after making a reception.

Zach Maynard threw for 188 yards and was picked off once and sacked six times, accounting for three turnovers. Isi Sofele was held to 52 rushing yards with one touchdown run, while Marvin Jones and Keenan Allen logged 88 and 82 yards through the air, respectively. Cal committed five turnovers, the most since the October 29 matchup against UCLA. Texas quarterback David Ash threw for 142 yards and a score and was sacked twice, but earned Offensive MVP honors. Receiver Marquise Goodwin had 49 yards through the air and 33 on the ground with a touchdown reception, as the Longhorns outrushed the Bears 109–7, giving Cal their lowest single-game rushing total since 2000. Linebacker Keenan Robinson was named the Defensive MVP.

== Postseason ==
Defensive line coach Tosh Lupoi, who had been with the program for twelve years, and wide receivers coach Eric Kiesau, who had joined the program just that year, both left to join the Washington coaching staff in mid January 2012. Coach and former NFL wide receiver Wes Chandler succeeded Kiesau on January 18. Coach and former NFL linebacker Todd Howard was named as Lupoi's replacement after having fulfilled the same role at Washington State the previous season.

In the 2012 NFL draft, six Cal players were selected, the most out of any Pac-12 school. Linebacker Mychal Kendricks and offensive tackle Mitchell Schwartz were taken in the second round, punter Bryan Anger in the third, receiver Marvin Jones in the fifth, and safety D. J. Campbell and defensive end Trevor Guyton in the seventh. Anger became the highest drafted punter since 1995.
