= David Ash (American football) =

American football player (born 1992)

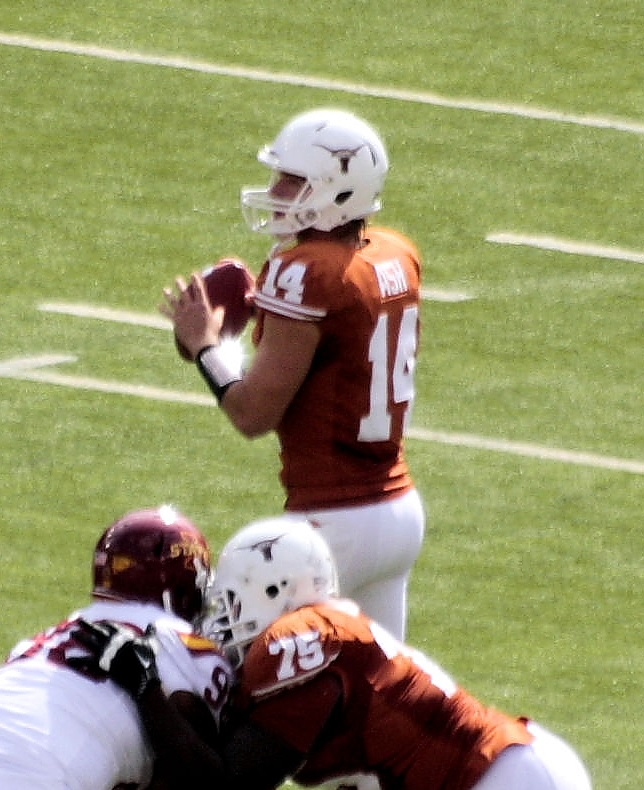
- Ash with the Texas Longhorns in 2012

No. 14
- Position: Quarterback

Personal information
- Born: July 29, 1992 (age 34); Houston, Texas, U.S.
- Listed height: 6 ft 3 in (1.91 m)
- Listed weight: 230 lb (104 kg)

Career information
- High school: Belton (TX)
- College: Texas (2011–2014)
- NFL draft: 2015: undrafted

Career history
- The Spring League (2017); Warsaw Mets (2021)

David Trenton Ash (born July 29, 1992) is an American former football quarterback who last played for the Warsaw Mets in the Polish Football League. He played college football for the University of Texas Longhorns. After an impressive start that included being named the offensive MVP in the 2011 Holiday Bowl, he was forced to end his career early in the face of repeated concussions and concussion-related symptoms.

On March 16, 2017, however, Ash was medically cleared to play football again, and participated in the Longhorns' 2017 pro day.

== High school career ==
Ash attended Academy High School (in which school system his father was a middle school principal) before transferring to Belton High School in Belton, Texas his sophomore year. He played as both quarterback and punter. In his three seasons, Ash compiled an 18–15 record. Ash made his first start against Ennis High School in 2008, a game Belton lost 43–8. In his junior year in 2009, Ash led the Belton Tigers to the second round of the Class 5A Texas football playoffs before falling to South Garland High School in a 14–24 loss. Ash led the Tigers to a 5–6 record in his senior year with 38 touchdowns and only 10 interceptions. He also set multiple school records, including most career passing yardage, completions, and touchdowns. After his senior year, Ash was named the all-state second team quarterback and all-state first team punter.

== College career ==
=== 2011 season ===
Ash committed to the Texas Longhorns on February 13, 2010, becoming the fourth player to commit to the football team during the 2010 recruiting class. Headed into the first game of the 2011 season against Rice, Ash was placed as a third-string quarterback on Texas' depth chart, alongside redshirt freshman Connor Wood and behind Case McCoy and Garrett Gilbert, respectively. In the season opener, Ash threw his first pass as a Texas Longhorns player for two yards. In the next game against the BYU Cougars, Ash remained as a backup quarterback, but was put into action after Garrett Gilbert was benched in the second quarter after throwing two interceptions. Ash threw for 35 yards against BYU while rotating at the quarterback position alongside Case McCoy. Ash and McCoy continued into their next game against UCLA as co-starters at the quarterback position, although McCoy would end up seeing more playing time. Ash threw his first touchdown in his collegiate career in the next game against Iowa State on a 48-yard pass to Mike Davis. Ash scored two touchdowns in a 37–14 victory against the Cyclones. In the annual Red River Rivalry against Oklahoma, Ash threw another touchdown but also threw two interceptions. Texas lost, 17–55, their worst loss against the Sooners since 2003. Because of McCoy's uneven performance in that game, Ash was named the starter for the next five games, during which the team went 2–3, and Ash was twice replaced by McCoy. After McCoy nearly sparked a comeback against Kansas State, Ash lost the starting job to him against Texas A&M and Baylor. But a poor performance in the Baylor game, combined with good practices by Ash, led to another change at quarterback and Ash started in the Holiday Bowl against California. In that game he completed 14 of 23 passes for 142 yards and one touchdown while also catching a 4-yard touchdown pass from Jaxon Shipley, and was named the game's offensive MVP.

=== 2012 season ===
During the 2012 Texas spring game, Ash began the game with the Horns team to start the game and flipped between the Horns and Texas team throughout the scrimmage. However, Ash only threw seven passes, of which six were completed for 87 yards, including one touchdown. Ash also ran for only six yards on five attempts. The Texas team won the scrimmage 35–28. After the spring game and throughout the offseason, it was undecided whether Case McCoy or Ash would be the Longhorns' starting quarterback, with both appearing in preseason drills. However, on August 22, 2012, Ash was finally named the starting quarterback for Texas over McCoy.

Ash made his first start of the 2012 season against Wyoming on September 1. In the season opener, Ash completed 74.1% of his passes for 156 passing yards. Ash's single touchdown came on a 16-yard strike to wide receiver Jaxon Shipley. The quarterback also ran three times for eight yards, helping the team to a 37–17 victory to begin the 2012 season.

Against New Mexico, Ash once again threw no interceptions and completed a 72.7% completion percentage. Ash also threw for two touchdowns, including a 45-yard shovel pass to Daje Johnson in the third quarter, and a personal best of 221 yards. Through the first 10 games, Ash led Texas to 8 wins, including gutsy road wins against #22 Oklahoma State and #20 Texas Tech. In the Oklahoma State game, he led Texas on back-to-back 75 yard drives in the last ten minutes of the game for the win. In a losing effort against TCU he injured his ribs and kept playing, but then was forced to sit out the next week against Kansas State. He led the Horns to an 8–4 regular season which was good for third place in the Big 12 and an appearance in the 2012 Valero Alamo Bowl against Oregon State. Ash threw for 2 touchdowns and rushed for another as the Horns won the Alamo Bowl 31–27 to finish the season ranked #18.

=== 2013 season ===
Ash's 2013 season got off to a quick start against New Mexico as Ash threw for 343 yards and 4 touchdowns, and also ran 91 yards and a touchdown as #15 Texas defeated New Mexico State 56–7. However, in the next game Ash threw for 251 yards and 2 touchdowns before suffering a concussion late in the 4th quarter against a BYU team that would ultimately upset the Longhorns 40–21. After missing the 3rd game of the year against Ole Miss, Ash returned to game action and threw for 166 yards and 1 touchdown in the first half against Kansas State before re-aggravating his concussion in the 31–21 victory. Ash's concussion turned out to be more severe the 2nd time around as Ash was unable to return to the Longhorns for the remainder of the 2013 season.

=== 2014 season ===
Ash was given a medical hardship for the 2013 season, meaning that he entered 2014 with two years of remaining eligibility. At the end of spring training, he suffered a Jones fracture in his foot, an injury that required surgery.

In the first game of the 2014 season, Ash threw for 190 yards and a touchdown as Texas beat North Texas by a score of 38–7. He played almost the entire game and reported no concussion symptoms during it, but later that evening, he reported experiencing headaches and dizziness and was brought in for further evaluation. Ash reported believing that the first hit in that game triggered a recurrence of the symptoms that caused him to miss most of the 2013 season. As a result, Tyrone Swoopes was named the starter for the next game against BYU. On September 17, 2014, Ash announced that he would be walking away from football due to multiple concussions in his career.

=== Statistics ===
Season	Team	GP	Cmp	Att	Pct	Yds	TD	Int	Rtg	Att	Yds	TD
2011	Texas	13	99	174	56.9	1,079	4	8	107.4	73	103	1
2012	Texas	13	214	318	67.3	2,669	19	8	153.3	51	141	2
2013	Texas	3	53	87	60.9	760	7	2	156.3	31	152	1
2014	Texas	1	19	34	55.9	190	1	0	112.5	7	−17	1
Totals		30	385	612	62.9	4,728	31	18	138.6	162	379	5

=== Awards ===
Results
Won
Honorable mention
Nominated

Ash's college career awards
Award	Date	Team Last Played	Source(s)
2011 Holiday Bowl Most Valuable Offensive Player	December 28, 2011	California (W 21–10)	
University of Texas Athletics Director's Honor Roll^{†‡}	Spring 2012	—	
Big 12 Offensive Player of the Week	September 17, 2012	Ole Miss (W 66–31)	
College Football Performance Awards National Quarterback of the Week	September 17, 2012	Ole Miss (W 66–31)	
Davey O'Brien Quarterback of the Week	September 17, 2012	Ole Miss (W 66–31)	
Manning Award Quarterback of the Week (Nominated)	September 17, 2012	Ole Miss (W 66–31)	
Offensive Player of the Game^{†‡}	October 1, 2012	Oklahoma State (W 41–36)	
College Football Performance Awards Honorable Mention National Quarterback of the Week	October 1, 2012	Oklahoma State (W 41–36)	
Manning Award Player of the Week (Nominated)	October 1, 2012	Oklahoma State (W 41–36)	
Offensive Player of the Game^{†}	October 8, 2012	West Virginia (L 45–48)	
^{†} Awarded by own team^{‡} Shared

=== Records ===
- UT – Touchdown passes by a true freshman (4)
- UT – Fastest to 1,000 yards in a single season (4 games), tied with Colt McCoy, Major Applewhite and James Brown

== Professional career ==
Pre-draft measurables
Height	Weight	40-yard dash	10-yard split	20-yard split	20-yard shuttle	Three-cone drill	Vertical jump	Broad jump
6 ft 3 in (1.91 m)	225 lb (102 kg)	4.81 s	1.75 s	2.81 s	4.66 s	7.22 s	33 in (0.84 m)	9 ft 11 in (3.02 m)
All values from Texas Pro Day

In 2017, Ash unretired from football and was medically cleared to play. Per his agent, vestibular migraines were giving off concussion symptoms and have been controlled by medication. He took part in Texas's 2017 Pro Day. He then participated in The Spring League as an opportunity to gain experience among other young professionals and veterans of the NFL, and to create game film by participating in games for the instructional league during its debut year of operation. Among his highlights was a 41-yard touchdown pass to wide receiver Kenzel Doe. Following his performance during The Spring League, Ash was invited to the Carolina Panthers rookie mini-camp in May 2017, but was not signed to a contract. Ash played for The Spring League again in July as part of the Showcase game, where he started the game for the California roster and led several scoring drives. He completed 9-of-13 passes for 96 yards and a 4-yard touchdown pass to Anthony Dixon and rushed three times for a total of 10 yards, with his longest for 9 yards. However, Ash's California roster lost to the East roster, 23–19.

=== Europe ===
On April 23, 2021, David Ash signed with the Warsaw Mets of the Polish Football League. The team went 3–5 and lost in the first round of the playoffs.

== Personal life ==
Ash is the son of Stephen and Lynn Ash and one of six children. His father, Stephen was a principal at Academy Middle School in Little River, Texas. Ash is also a devout Christian and participates in the Fellowship of Christian Athletes and Young Life. He completed undergraduate study to obtain Bachelor of Science in Communications, then furthered his study to confer the Master of Science in Finance from The University of Texas at Austin.
