= 2011 Holiday Bowl =

2011 Bridgepoint Education Holiday Bowl
- 34th Holiday Bowl Game
California Golden Bears	Texas Longhorns
(7–5)	(7–5)
Pac-12	Big 12
10	21
Head coach: Jeff Tedford	Head coach: Mack Brown
	AP / Coaches / BCS; NR / RV / 24
	1	2	3	4	Total
California	3	0	7	0	10
Texas	0	7	7	7	21
- Date: December 28, 2011
- Season: 2011
- Stadium: Qualcomm Stadium
- Location: San Diego, California
- MVP: Offense: David Ash (QB, Texas); Defense: Keenan Robinson (LB, Texas)
- Favorite: Texas by 3
- Referee: Matt Moore (Southeastern Conference)
- Attendance: 56,313
- Payout: US$1 million per team

United States TV coverage
- Network: ESPN
- Announcers: Rece Davis (Play-by-Play); Jesse Palmer (Analyst); Jenn Brown (Sidelines)
- Nielsen ratings: 2.69

The 2011 Bridgepoint Education Holiday Bowl, the 34th edition of the game, was a postseason American college football bowl game between the Texas Longhorns of the Big 12 Conference and the California Golden Bears of the Pac-12 Conference (Pac-12), on December 28, 2011, at Qualcomm Stadium in San Diego, California. The game was the final contest of the 2011 NCAA Division I-Football Bowl Subdivision (Division I-FBS) football season for both teams, and it ended in a 21–10 victory for Texas.

Texas was selected to play in the 2011 Holiday Bowl following a 7–5 regular season that included a last-second victory at Texas A&M and double-digit losses to then-No. 1 (Note: All rankings are based on the Coaches' Poll unless otherwise noted.) Oklahoma, then-No. 7 Oklahoma State, and then-No. 18 Baylor. The Longhorns faced California, who also had an identical 7–5 regular season, highlighted by an overtime victory at Colorado and a 3-point loss to then-No. 8 Stanford.

California scored the only points of the first quarter on a 49-yard field goal by placekicker Giorgio Tavecchio. In the second quarter Texas' placekicker Justin Tucker missed a 38-yard field goal but were later able to score on a 4-yard reverse pass touchdown reception by wide receiver Jaxon Shipley. California answered in the third quarter on a touchdown run by running-back Isi Sofele, but the Golden Bears would not score any more points afterwards. Texas scored later in the third quarter on a 47-yard reception by wide receiver Marquise Goodwin and in the fourth quarter on a 4-yard run by running-back Cody Johnson to end the game.

Texas quarterback David Ash was named player of the game, and finished with 142 passing yards and one touchdown while also attaining a touchdown reception. Texas linebacker Keenan Robinson was named the defensive MVP after finishing with eight tackles and a pass deflection.

== Teams ==
Entering the contest, both teams shared a few similarities. Each had an identical record (7–5) and last played in a bowl during the 2009 season, which they both lost (Texas lost the BCS National Championship Game to Alabama and Cal lost the Poinsettia Bowl, also in San Diego, to Utah.) Both teams also identical posted losing records (5–7) during the 2010 season. Their respective records in Holiday Bowl were also split. Texas lead the series with Cal 4–0, and was ranked in the nation’s top 10 in each of the series' games. Both teams were strong on defense with the Longhorns standing at No. 14 in total defense (315.33 ypg) and the Bears No. 26 (339.42 ypg).

=== Texas ===
Texas began the season with a four-game winning streak which included a defeat of UCLA in Pasadena. Following a loss to then #1 Oklahoma, the Longhorns only managed to put together three more wins for the rest of the season, although three of their losses during this period came against higher ranked opponents. Texas finished with a 7–5 record following the program's first losing season since 1997. This was Texas' fifth trip to the Holiday Bowl, the most recent being in 2007, and their prior record was 2–2. The Texas offense came into the game with the nation's No. 19 rushing team (210.42 ypg) but only No. 85 in passing (193.58 ypg), while the defense had been stingy against the run at No. 11 (103.67 ypg) and No. 47 in pass defense (211.67 ypg).

=== California ===
California began the season with a three-game winning streak, during which head coach Jeff Tedford became with the winningest coach in program history. The Bears then had three straight losses, including their sole home loss of the season. They were able to get four more wins, improving to a 7–5 mark following the first losing season in Tedford's tenure as head coach. This was Cal's third Holiday Bowl, the most recent being in 2006, and their prior record was 1–1. Coincidentally they had faced Texas teams in all of their Holiday Bowl matchups, with Texas Tech in 2004 and Texas A&M in 2006. Notably, the 2004 appearance resulted after Texas head coach Mack Brown had lobbied for an invitation to the Rose Bowl over Cal. Tedford said the incident "was a long time ago. I felt bad for our team because I really felt like we deserved to be in the Rose Bowl that year, but we're in 2011 now and it is a whole different situation." Cal has a balanced offense, which is No. 37 in total offense (418.67 ypg), No. 38 in passing (251.50) and No. 48 in rushing (167.17 ypg).

== Game summary ==
=== First quarter ===
Texas received the ball to start the game but was unable to move the ball past midfield despite a fourth down conversion in their own territory. Cal was able to drive 70 yards on its first possession for a 47-yard field goal. After a three and out, Texas got the ball back when Zach Maynard was picked off by Quandre Diggs, but in turn went three and out. However Maynard was then sacked for a fumble in Cal territory.

=== Second quarter ===
Texas' attempt to capitalize on the turnover failed when a 38-yard field goal missed. Two possessions later the Longhorns started in Cal territory and were able to drive down to the Cal 4-yard line on a 30-yard reception by tight end Blaine Irby. They then set up a trick play in which receiver Jaxon Shipley threw a pass to quarterback David Ash for the first touchdown of the game.

=== Third quarter ===
Cal opened the half with a 69-yard drive that was capped off by a 6-yard touchdown run by Isi Sofele. However Texas came right back with a 47-yard scoring reception by receiver Marquise Goodwin to take hold of the lead. The Cal defense held following a Sofele fumble on the ensuing drive, but Maynard was sacked on the final Cal possession of the quarter. Goodwin then had a 37-yard run to put the ball on the Cal 7-yard line.

=== Fourth quarter ===
This set up a 4-yard touchdown run by running back Cody Johnson for the game's final score. Late in the quarter the final Cal turnover occurred when receiver Marvin Jones fumbled after making a reception.

=== Scoring summary ===
Scoring summary

Quarter	Time	Drive			Team	Scoring information	Score	
Quarter	Time	Plays	Yards	TOP	Team	Scoring information	California	Texas
1	6:06	11	40	4:59	California	49-yard field goal by Giorgio Tavecchio	3	0
2	6:08	4	48	1:19	Texas	David Ash 4-yard touchdown reception from Jaxon Shipley, Justin Tucker kick good	3	7
3	9:47	11	69	5:13	California	Isi Sofele 6-yard touchdown run, Giorgio Tavecchio kick good	10	7
3	8:06	4	76	1:41	Texas	Marquise Goodwin 47-yard touchdown reception from David Ash, Justin Tucker kick good	10	14
4	14:57	3	44	0:47	Texas	Cody Johnson 4-yard touchdown run, Justin Tucker kick good	10	21
"TOP" = time of possession. For other American football terms, see Glossary of American football.							10	21

=== Statistics ===
Statistics	California	Texas
First downs	15	13
Rushes-yards (net)	36–7	35–109
Passing yards (net)	188	146
Passes, Att-Comp-Int	33–19–1	24–15–0
Total offense, plays – yards	69–195	59–255
Time of Possession	31:08	28:52

=== Game notes ===
- This was Cal's second bowl loss in a row, going back to the 2009 Poinsettia Bowl, and Texas' second straight Holiday Bowl victory, following a win in 2007 over Arizona State. Cal is 1–3 in its bowl trips to San Diego.
- Texas' record against Cal improved to 5–0.
