= 2013 Texas Longhorns football team =

American college football season

2013 Texas Longhorns football

Alamo Bowl, L 7–30 vs. Oregon
- Conference: Big 12 Conference
- Record: 8–5 (7–2 Big 12)
- Head coach: Mack Brown (16th season)
- Co-offensive coordinators: Major Applewhite (3rd season); Darrell Wyatt (1st season)
- Offensive scheme: Pro-style
- Defensive coordinator: Greg Robinson (2nd season)
- Base defense: 4–3
- Home stadium: Darrell K Royal–Texas Memorial Stadium

2013 Big 12 Conference football standings
| | Conf. | | | Overall |
| Team | W | | L | W | | L |
|---|---|---|---|---|---|---|
| No. 13 Baylor $ | 8 | – | 1 | 11 | – | 2 |
| No. 6 Oklahoma % | 7 | – | 2 | 11 | – | 2 |
| No. 17 Oklahoma State | 7 | – | 2 | 10 | – | 3 |
| Texas | 7 | – | 2 | 8 | – | 5 |
| Kansas State | 5 | – | 4 | 8 | – | 5 |
| Texas Tech | 4 | – | 5 | 8 | – | 5 |
| TCU | 2 | – | 7 | 4 | – | 8 |
| West Virginia | 2 | – | 7 | 4 | – | 8 |
| Iowa State | 2 | – | 7 | 3 | – | 9 |
| Kansas | 1 | – | 8 | 3 | – | 9 |
$ – BCS representative as conference champion; % – BCS at-large representative; Rankings from AP Poll

The 2013 Texas Longhorns football team (variously "Texas," "UT," the "Longhorns," or the "Horns") represented the University of Texas at Austin in the 2013 NCAA Division I FBS football season, as a member of the Big 12 Conference. The Longhorns were led by 16th-year head coach Mack Brown and played their home games at Darrell K Royal–Texas Memorial Stadium (DKR). The team was also coached by offensive coordinators Major Applewhite and Darrell Wyatt, as well as defensive coordinator Greg Robinson; Manny Diaz was defensive coordinator to begin the season but was fired following the team's second game against Brigham Young (BYU).

The season began with a win at home against New Mexico State on August 31. However, this was followed by back-to-back blowout losses against out-of-conference opponents BYU and Ole Miss; as such Texas' off-conference record was 1–2. Texas later won their conference opener against Kansas State, resulting in the Longhorns' first win against the Wildcats since 2003. Texas would later go on to attain a five-game winning streak, including a win against No. 10 Oklahoma in the Red River Rivalry. (Note: All rankings are based on the Coaches' Poll unless otherwise noted.) The Texas Longhorns ended the season with an 8–4 overall win–loss record and a 7–2 conference record. Despite entering the season ranked No. 15, the Longhorns dropped out of the Coaches' and AP Polls.

After the regular season, Jackson Jeffcoat was awarded the Ted Hendricks Award as college football's top defensive end.

The season ended with a 30–7 loss to Oregon in the Alamo Bowl. This was the final game that Mack Brown would coach the Longhorns, as he announced that he would resign from his position following the bowl game on December 14, 2013.

== Preseason ==
=== Recruiting ===
==== Position key ====
| Back | B | Center | C | Cornerback | CB | Defensive back | DB |
| Defensive end | DE | Defensive lineman | DL | Defensive tackle | DT | End | E |
| Fullback | FB | Guard | OG | Halfback | HB | Kicker | K |
| Kickoff returner | KR | Offensive tackle | OT | Offensive lineman | OL | Linebacker | LB |
| Long snapper | LS | Punter | P | Punt returner | PR | Quarterback | QB |
| Running back | RB | Safety | S | Tight end | TE | Wide receiver | WR |

==== Recruits ====
College recruiting
| Name | Hometown | School | Height | Weight | 40^{‡} | Commit date |
|---|---|---|---|---|---|---|
| Chevoski Collins; WR | Livingston, Texas | Livingston H.S. | 6 ft 0 in (1.83 m) | 187 lb (85 kg) | 4.5 | Oct 8, 2012 |
| Chevoski Collins; WR | Recruit ratings: Scout: Rivals: (82) | | | | | |
| Antwuan Davis; CB | Bastrop, Texas | Bastrop H.S. | 6 ft 0 in (1.83 m) | 177 lb (80 kg) | 4.4 | May 4, 2012 |
| Antwuan Davis; CB | Recruit ratings: Scout: Rivals: (83) | | | | | |
| Deoundrei Davis; OLB | Cypress, Texas | Cypress Woods High School | 6 ft 2 in (1.88 m) | 210 lb (95 kg) | – | Feb 26, 2012 |
| Deoundrei Davis; OLB | Recruit ratings: Scout: Rivals: (83) | | | | | |
| Rami Hammad; OG | Irving, Texas | Irving H.S. | 6 ft 5 in (1.96 m) | 315 lb (143 kg) | 5.5 | Jan 23, 2013 |
| Rami Hammad; OG | Recruit ratings: Scout: Rivals: (79) | | | | | |
| Desmond Harrison; OT | San Pablo, California | Contra Costa College | 6 ft 8 in (2.03 m) | 312 lb (142 kg) | – | Jan 21, 2013 |
| Desmond Harrison; OT | Recruit ratings: Scout: Rivals: (79) | | | | | |
| Naashon Hughes; OLB | Killeen, Texas | Harker Heights H.S. | 6 ft 4 in (1.93 m) | 212 lb (96 kg) | – | Feb 28, 2012 |
| Naashon Hughes; OLB | Recruit ratings: Scout: Rivals: (78) | | | | | |
Overall recruit ranking: Scout: 23 Rivals: 24 ESPN: 16
‡ Refers to 40-yard dash; Note: In many cases, Scout, Rivals, 247Sports, On3, and ESPN may conflict in their listings of height, weight and 40 time.; In these cases, the average was taken. ESPN grades are on a 100-point scale.; Sources: "Texas Football Commitments". Rivals.; "2013 Texas Football Commits". Scout.; "ESPN". ESPN.; "Scout.com Team Recruiting Rankings". Scout.; "2013 Team Ranking". Rivals.com.

== Schedule ==
| Date | Time | Opponent | Rank | Site | TV | Result | Attendance |
|---|---|---|---|---|---|---|---|
| August 31 | 7:00 p.m. | New Mexico State* | No. 15 | Darrell K Royal–Texas Memorial Stadium; Austin, TX | LHN | W 56–7 | 99,623 |
| September 7 | 6:00 p.m. | at BYU* | No. 15 | LaVell Edwards Stadium; Provo, UT | ESPN2/LHN | L 21–40 | 63,197 |
| September 14 | 7:00 p.m. | No. 25 Ole Miss* | | Darrell K Royal–Texas Memorial Stadium; Austin, TX | LHN | L 23–44 | 101,474 |
| September 21 | 7:00 p.m. | Kansas State | | Darrell K Royal–Texas Memorial Stadium; Austin, TX | ABC | W 31–21 | 95,248 |
| October 3 | 6:30 p.m. | at Iowa State | | Jack Trice Stadium; Ames, IA | ESPN | W 31–30 | 52,762 |
| October 12 | 11:00 a.m. | vs. No. 12 Oklahoma | | Cotton Bowl; Dallas, TX (Red River Rivalry) | ABC | W 36–20 | 92,500 |
| October 26 | 6:30 p.m. | at TCU | | Amon G. Carter Stadium; Fort Worth, TX (rivalry) | FS1/FS2/FSSW^{A} | W 30–7 | 48,212 |
| November 2 | 2:30 p.m. | Kansas | | Darrell K Royal–Texas Memorial Stadium; Austin, TX | JayhawkTV/LHN | W 35–13 | 97,105 |
| November 9 | 6:00 p.m. | at West Virginia | | Mountaineer Field; Morgantown, WV | FOX | W 47–40 ^{OT} | 58,570 |
| November 16 | 2:30 p.m. | No. 12 Oklahoma State | No. 23 | Darrell K Royal–Texas Memorial Stadium; Austin, TX | FOX | L 13–38 | 99,739 |
| November 28 | 6:30 p.m. | Texas Tech^{†} | | Darrell K Royal–Texas Memorial Stadium; Austin, TX (Battle for the Chancellor's Spurs) | FS1 | W 41–16 | 100,668 |
| December 7 | 2:30 p.m. | at No. 9 Baylor | No. 25 | Floyd Casey Stadium; Waco, TX (rivalry) | FOX | L 10–30 | 51,728 |
| December 30 | 5:45 p.m. | vs. No. 10 Oregon* | | Alamodome; San Antonio, TX (Alamo Bowl) | ESPN | L 7–30 | 65,918 |
*Non-conference game; ^{†}Homecoming; Rankings from AP Poll released prior to game; All times are in Central time

- ^ADue to a weather delay during Texas' game against TCU, the game, originally broadcast on Fox Sports 1, was moved to Fox Sports 2 and Fox Sports Southwest.

== Depth chart ==
Texas depth chart as of the team's first game against New Mexico State.

Defense

FS
Mykkele Thompson
Adrian Colbert
⋅

| WLB | MLB | SLB |
|---|---|---|
| Jordan Hicks | Steve Edmond | Peter Jinkens |
| Kendall Thompson | Dalton Santos | Tevin Jackson |
| ⋅ | ⋅ | ⋅ |

SS
Adrian Phillips
Leroy Scott
⋅

CB
Duke Thomas
Sheroid Evans
⋅

| DE | DT | DT | DE |
|---|---|---|---|
| Jackson Jeffcoat | Chris Whaley | Malcom Brown | Cedric Reed |
| Shiro Davis | Desmond Jackson | Hassan Ridgeway | Reggie Wilson |
| Bryce Cottrell | ⋅ | Alex Norman | ⋅ |

CB
Carrington Byndom
Bryson Echols
⋅

Offense

X-Receiver
Mike Davis
Marcus Johnson
⋅

Z-Receiver
John Harris
Jaxon Shipley
⋅

| LT | LG | C | RG | RT |
|---|---|---|---|---|
| Donald Hawkins | Trey Hopkins | Dominic Espinosa | Mason Walters | Josh Cochran |
| Desmond Harrison | Sedrick Flowers | Garrett Porter | Kent Perkins | Kennedy Estelle |
| ⋅ | ⋅ | ⋅ | Curtis Riser | ⋅ |

TE
Geoff Swaim
Greg Daniels
M.J. McFarland

H-Receiver
Daje Johnson
Jacorey Warrick
⋅

QB
David Ash
Case McCoy
Tyrone Swoopes

Special teams
PK Anthony Fera
PK Nick Jordan
P Anthony Fera
P Will Russ
KR Duke Thomas / Mykelle Thompson
Daje Johnson / Jacorey Warrick
PR Quandre Diggs / Daje Johnson
LS Nate Boyer / Kyle Ashby
H Case McCrary / Will Russ

RB
Johnathan Gray
Malcolm Brown
Joe Bergeron

== Game summaries ==
=== New Mexico State ===
New Mexico State at #15 Texas

| Team | 1 | 2 | 3 | 4 | Total |
|---|---|---|---|---|---|
| Aggies | 0 | 7 | 0 | 0 | 7 |
| • #15 Longhorns | 0 | 14 | 21 | 21 | 56 |

- Date: August 31, 2013
- Location: Darrell K Royal–Texas Memorial Stadium • Austin, Texas
- Game start: 7:06 p.m. (Actual; scheduled 7:00 p.m.)
- Elapsed time: 3:17
- Game attendance: 99,623
- Game weather: Clear; 100°F (38°C); wind S 5–10 mph (8.0–16.1 km/h)
- Referee: Cooper Castleberry
- TV announcers (LHN): Dave LaMont, Ray Bentley, and Kaylee Hartung

Scoring summary
| 2 | 2:28 | NMSU | Joshua Bowen 11-yard pass from Andrew McDonald (Mazwell Johnson kick) | NMSU 7–0 |
| 2 | 1:48 | TEX | John Harris 54-yard pass from David Ash (Anthony Fera kick) | 7–7 |
| 2 | 1:08 | TEX | Daje Johnson 66-yard pass from David Ash (Anthony Fera kick) | TEX 14–7 |
| 3 | 12:48 | TEX | Daje Johnson 24-yard run (Anthony Fera kick) | TEX 21–7 |
| 3 | 10:27 | TEX | David Ash 55-yard run (Anthony Fera kick) | TEX 28–7 |
| 3 | 8:11 | TEX | Malcolm Brown 74-yard pass from David Ash (Anthony Fera kick) | TEX 35–7 |
| 4 | 11:51 | TEX | Mike Davis 25-yard pass from David Ash (Anthony Fera kick) | TEX 42–7 |
| 4 | 6:12 | TEX | Jalen Overstreet 1-yard run (Anthony Fera kick) | TEX 49–7 |
| 4 | 1:26 | TEX | Jalen Overstreet 38-yard run (Anthony Fera kick) | TEX 56–7 |

| Overall record | Previous meeting | Previous winner | Sources |
|---|---|---|---|
| 4–0 | 2003 | #4 Texas, 66–7 | |

Prior to the game, sports betting oddsmakers favored Texas to win by 42 points, with an over-under of approximately 58 points. The game was sponsored by Southwest Airlines and showcased the Longhorns Alumni Band and members of the 1963 Texas Longhorns football team.

The Texas Longhorns began the game by kicking the ball off to New Mexico State. Throughout the first quarter, both teams were held scoreless by the opposing defense. The Aggies had four drives in the first quarter, with two ending on punts, one on a turnover on downs, and the final drive ending on a fumble. The Longhorns' first three drive ended on a fumble, turnover on downs, and a punt, respectively. In the second quarter, Texas quarterback David Ash threw two interceptions; on the second turnover New Mexico State was able to drive downfield to achieve the first score of the game on an 11-yard pass. After these two turnovers, however, David Ash would throw two touchdown passes in excess of 50 yards, and as such the score at the end of the first half was 14–7, with Texas leading.

In the third quarter, Texas scored on three consecutive touchdowns to begin the second half, including a 74-yard pass from David Ash to Malcolm Brown. The final two Longhorns drives in the third quarter ended in punts. New Mexico State began to third quarter with a drive ending in an interception; the four subsequent drives ended on punts. All Texas drives in the fourth quarter ended in touchdowns, while the Aggies were held scoreless. The game ended with Texas winning 56–7, exceeding the point spread and over-under set by oddsmakers prior to the game.

Despite being held scoreless until the final two minutes of the second quarter, the Longhorns' offense broke several records. The offense recorded 715 yards of total offense, breaking a 1998 school record for most offensive output in a single game. The offensive output also was the first game in which Texas recorded at least 700 yards of total offense. In addition, the 359 yards of passing and 356 yards of rushing marked only the fourth time in school history in which at least 300 yards were recorded for both passing and rushing in a single game. Four of Texas' touchdowns were scored on plays in excess of 50 yards, tying a Mack Brown record for most touchdown plays of such length in a single game. Of the 715 yards of total offense, 434 were at least partially attributable to quarterback David Ash, the most ever from a player in a season opener and sixth all-time.

=== BYU ===
#15 Texas at BYU

| Team | 1 | 2 | 3 | 4 | Total |
|---|---|---|---|---|---|
| #15 Longhorns | 7 | 7 | 7 | 0 | 21 |
| • Cougars | 10 | 17 | 13 | 0 | 40 |

- Date: September 7
- Location: LaVell Edwards Stadium
  Provo, UT
- Game start: 6:52 p.m. MST
- Elapsed time: 3:27
- Game attendance: 63,197
- Game weather: 63 °F (17 °C), Cloudy w/ Scattered Showers, winds variable, Game start delayed by 1 hour, 46 minutes by lightning
- Referee: Randy Christal
- TV announcers (ESPN2/LHN/BYUtv/Sports USA): Joe Tessitore, Matt Millen, and Maria Taylor (ESPN2); Craig Way, Roger Wallace, Rod Babers, and Kaylee Hartung (LHN); John Ahlers, Gary Barnett, and Scott Garrard (Sports USA); Dave McCann, Blaine Fowler, Kathy Aiken, and Spencer Linton (BYUtv)

Scoring summary
| 1 | 12:11 | BYU | Justin Sorensen 34-yard Field Goal | BYU 3–0 |
| 1 | 3:21 | UT | Mike Davis 57-yard Touchdown pass from David Ash (Anthony Fera kick) | Texas 7–3 |
| 1 | 2:17 | BYU | Taysom Hill 68-yard Touchdown Run (Justin Sorensen kick) | BYU 10–7 |
| 2 | 10:29 | UT | Justin Bergeron 2-yard Touchdown Run (Anthony Fera kick) | Texas 14–10 |
| 2 | 7:48 | BYU | Taysom Hill 20-yard Touchdown Run (Justin Sorensen kick) | BYU 17–14 |
| 2 | 5:00 | BYU | Paul Lasike 10-yard Touchdown Run (Justin Sorensen kick) | BYU 24–14 |
| 2 | 0:04 | BYU | Justin Sorensen 32-yard Field Goal | BYU 27–14 |
| 3 | 10:02 | BYU | Taysom Hill 26-yard Touchdown Run (Justin Sorensen kick) | BYU 34–14 |
| 3 | 10:02 | UT | Mike Davis 23-yard touchdown pass from David Ash (Anthony Fera kick) | BYU 34–21 |
| 3 | 5:43 | BYU | Justin Sorensen 36-yard Field Goal | BYU 37–21 |
| 3 | 1:31 | BYU | Justin Sorensen 24-yard Field Goal | BYU 40–21 |

| Overall record | Previous meeting | Previous winner | Sources |
|---|---|---|---|
| 1–2 | 2011 | #21 Texas, 17–16 | |

Heading into the game sports oddsmakers favored Texas to win by seven points, with an over-under of approximately 57, denoting a projected score of around 32 to 25, with Texas winning.

=== Ole Miss ===
#25 Ole Miss at Texas

| Team | 1 | 2 | 3 | 4 | Total |
|---|---|---|---|---|---|
| • #25 Rebels | 14 | 3 | 20 | 7 | 44 |
| Longhorns | 7 | 16 | 0 | 0 | 23 |

- Date: September 14, 2013
- Location: Darrell K Royal–Texas Memorial Stadium • Austin, Texas
- Game start: 7:00 p.m.
- Elapsed time: 3:26
- Game attendance: 101,474
- Game weather: Partly cloudy; 94°F (34°C); wind S 10 mph (16 km/h)
- Referee: Matt Austin
- TV announcers (LHN): Joe Tessitore, Matt Millen, and Kaylee Hartung

| Overall record | Previous meeting | Previous winner | Sources |
|---|---|---|---|
| 6–1 | 2012 | #12 Texas, 66–31 | |

=== Kansas State ===
Kansas State at Texas

| Team | 1 | 2 | 3 | 4 | Total |
|---|---|---|---|---|---|
| Wildcats | 0 | 7 | 0 | 14 | 21 |
| • Longhorns | 10 | 7 | 7 | 7 | 31 |

- Date: September 21, 2013
- Location: Darrell K Royal–Texas Memorial Stadium • Austin, Texas
- Game start: 7:12 p.m. (Actual; scheduled 7:00 p.m.)
- Elapsed time: 3:32
- Game attendance: 95,248
- Game weather: Clear; 78°F (26°C); wind NNE 13 mph (21 km/h)
- Referee: Reggie Smith
- TV announcers (ABC): Brent Musburger, Kirk Herbstreit, Heather Cox

| Overall record | Previous meeting | Previous winner | Sources |
|---|---|---|---|
| 5–8 | 2012 | Kansas State, 42–24 | |

=== Iowa State ===
Texas at Iowa State

| Team | 1 | 2 | 3 | 4 | Total |
|---|---|---|---|---|---|
| • Longhorns | 10 | 7 | 7 | 7 | 31 |
| Cyclones | 0 | 13 | 7 | 10 | 30 |

- Date: October 3, 2013
- Location: Jack Trice Stadium • Ames, Iowa
- Game start: 6:30 p.m.
- Elapsed time: 3:32
- Game attendance: 52,762
- Game weather: Mostly cloudy; 79°F (26°C); wind S 5 mph (8.0 km/h)
- Referee: Mike Defee
- TV announcers (ESPN): Rece Davis, Jesse Palmer, David Pollack & Samantha Ponder

| Overall record | Previous meeting | Previous winner | Sources |
|---|---|---|---|
| 9–1 | 2012 | #17 Texas, 33–7 | |

=== Oklahoma ===
Texas vs. #12 Oklahoma

| Team | 1 | 2 | 3 | 4 | Total |
|---|---|---|---|---|---|
| #12 Sooners | 3 | 7 | 3 | 7 | 20 |
| • Longhorns | 10 | 13 | 13 | 0 | 36 |

- Date: October 12, 2013
- Location: Cotton Bowl • Dallas, Texas
- Game start: 11:06 a.m. (Actual; scheduled 11:00 a.m.)
- Elapsed time: 3:29
- Game attendance: 92,500
- Game weather: Cloudy; 80°F (27°C); wind SW 15–20 mph (24–32 km/h)
- Referee: Greg Burks
- TV announcers (ABC): Brent Musburger, Todd Blackledge, and Heather Cox

| Overall record | Previous meeting | Previous winner | Sources |
|---|---|---|---|
| 59–43–5 | 2012 | #10 Oklahoma, 63–21 | |

=== TCU ===
Texas at TCU

| Team | 1 | 2 | 3 | 4 | Total |
|---|---|---|---|---|---|
| • Longhorns | 10 | 10 | 7 | 3 | 30 |
| Horned Frogs | 7 | 0 | 0 | 0 | 7 |

- Date: October 26–27, 2013
- Location: Amon G. Carter Stadium • Fort Worth, Texas
- Game start: 6:30 p.m. (Actual; scheduled 6:30 p.m.)
- Elapsed time: 2:53 (5:57 including weather delay)
- Game attendance: 48,212
- Game weather: Partly cloudy; 77°F (25°C); wind S 12 mph (19 km/h)
- Referee: Scott Novak
- TV announcers (FS1, FS2, FSW): Craig Bolerjack, Joey Harrington, and Ryan Nece

| Overall record | Previous meeting | Previous winner | Sources |
|---|---|---|---|
| 61–21–1 | 2012 | TCU , 20–13 | |

=== Kansas ===
Kansas at Texas

| Team | 1 | 2 | 3 | 4 | Total |
|---|---|---|---|---|---|
| Jayhawks | 0 | 3 | 3 | 7 | 13 |
| • Longhorns | 0 | 14 | 14 | 7 | 35 |

- Date: November 2, 2013
- Location: Darrell K Royal–Texas Memorial Stadium • Austin, Texas
- Game start: 2:36 p.m. (Actual; scheduled 2:30 p.m.)
- Elapsed time: 3:08
- Game attendance: 97,105
- Game weather: Clear; 72°F (22°C); wind NNW 10 mph (16 km/h)
- Referee: Dan Romeo
- TV announcers (LHN): Dave LaMont, Ray Bentley, and Kaylee Hartung

| Overall record | Previous meeting | Previous winner | Sources |
|---|---|---|---|
| 10–2 | 2012 | #23 Texas, 21–17 | |

=== West Virginia ===
Texas at West Virginia

| Team | 1 | 2 | 3 | 4 | OT | Total |
|---|---|---|---|---|---|---|
| • Longhorns | 3 | 10 | 17 | 10 | 7 | 47 |
| Mountaineers | 9 | 10 | 7 | 14 | 0 | 40 |

- Date: November 9, 2013
- Location: Milan Puskar Stadium • Morgantown, West Virginia
- Game start: 7:05 p.m. (Actual; scheduled 7:00 p.m.)
- Elapsed time: 4:07
- Game attendance: 58,570
- Game weather: Partly cloudy; 54°F (12°C); wind SSW 6 mph (9.7 km/h)
- Referee: Alan Eck
- TV announcers (FOX): Craig Bolerjack, Joey Harrington, and Ryan Nece

| Overall record | Previous meeting | Previous winner | Sources |
|---|---|---|---|
| 0–2 | 2012 | #7 West Virginia, 48–45 | |

=== Oklahoma State ===
#12 Oklahoma State at #24 Texas

| Team | 1 | 2 | 3 | 4 | Total |
|---|---|---|---|---|---|
| • #12 Cowboys | 7 | 21 | 10 | 0 | 38 |
| #24 Longhorns | 3 | 7 | 3 | 0 | 13 |

- Date: November 16, 2013
- Location: Darrell K Royal–Texas Memorial Stadium • Austin, Texas
- Game start: 2:30 p.m.
- Elapsed time: 3:08
- Game attendance: 99,739
- Game weather: Cloudy skies; 79°F (26°C); wind S 16 mph (26 km/h)
- Referee: Mike Defee
- TV announcers (FOX): Craig Bolerjack, Joey Harrington, and Ryan Nece

| Overall record | Previous meeting | Previous winner | Sources |
|---|---|---|---|
| 23–4 | 2012 | #10 Texas, 41–36 | |

=== Texas Tech ===
Texas Tech at Texas

| Team | 1 | 2 | 3 | 4 | Total |
|---|---|---|---|---|---|
| Red Raiders | 7 | 3 | 0 | 6 | 16 |
| • Longhorns | 10 | 10 | 7 | 14 | 41 |

- Date: November 28, 2013
- Location: Darrell K Royal–Texas Memorial Stadium • Austin, Texas
- Game start: 6:30 p.m.
- Elapsed time: 3:56
- Game attendance: 100,668
- Game weather: Mostly clear; 54°F (12°C); wind calm
- Referee: Greg Burks
- TV announcers (FS1): Gus Johnson, Charles Davis, and Kristina Pink

| Overall record | Previous meeting | Previous winner | Sources |
|---|---|---|---|
| 46–15 | 2012 | #22 Texas, 31–22 | |

=== Baylor ===
#23 Texas at #9 Baylor

| Team | 1 | 2 | 3 | 4 | Total |
|---|---|---|---|---|---|
| #23 Longhorns | 0 | 3 | 0 | 7 | 10 |
| • #9 Bears | 3 | 0 | 17 | 10 | 30 |

- Date: December __, 2013
- Location: Floyd Casey Stadium • Waco, Texas
- Game start: 2:30 p.m.
- Elapsed time: 3:28
- Game attendance: 51,728
- Game weather: Cloudy; 24°F (−4.4°C); wind N 10 mph (16 km/h)
- Referee: Scott Novak
- TV announcers (FOX): Gus Johnson, Charles Davis, and Kristina Pink

| Overall record | Previous meeting | Previous winner | Sources |
|---|---|---|---|
| 74–25–4 | 2012 | Texas, 56–50 | |

=== Oregon ===
#10 Oregon vs. Texas

| Team | 1 | 2 | 3 | 4 | Total |
|---|---|---|---|---|---|
| • Ducks | 10 | 10 | 3 | 7 | 30 |
| Longhorns | 7 | 0 | 0 | 0 | 7 |

- Date: December 30, 2013
- Location: Alamodome • San Antonio, Texas
- Game start: 5:45 p.m.
- Game attendance: 65,918
- Game weather: Indoors
- TV announcers (ESPN): Brad Nessler, Todd Blackledge, and Holly Rowe

| Overall record | Previous meeting | Previous winner | Sources |
|---|---|---|---|
| 4–1 | 2000 | #8 Oregon 35–30 | |

== Rankings ==
On August 2, 2013, the USA Today Preseason Coaches' Poll was released, followed by the Associated Press College Poll on August 17. Both polls placed Texas at No. 15, making it the second consecutive year that both polls placed Texas at that ranking.

Ranking movements Legend: ██ Increase in ranking ██ Decrease in ranking — = Not ranked RV = Received votes
| | Week | | | | | | | | | | | | | | | | |
| Poll | Pre | 1 | 2 | 3 | 4 | 5 | 6 | 7 | 8 | 9 | 10 | 11 | 12 | 13 | 14 | 15 | Final |
|---|---|---|---|---|---|---|---|---|---|---|---|---|---|---|---|---|---|
| AP | 15 | 15 | RV | — | — | — | — | RV | RV | RV | RV | 23 | RV | RV | 23 | RV | — |
| Coaches | 15 | 16 | RV | — | RV | — | — | RV | RV | RV | RV | 24 | RV | RV | 24 | RV | RV |
| Harris | Not released | | | | | | | RV | RV | RV | RV | 24 | RV | RV | 24 | RV | Not released |
| BCS | Not released | | | | | | | | — | — | — | 24 | — | — | 25 | — | Not released |
