= Trey Hopkins =

American football player (born 1992)

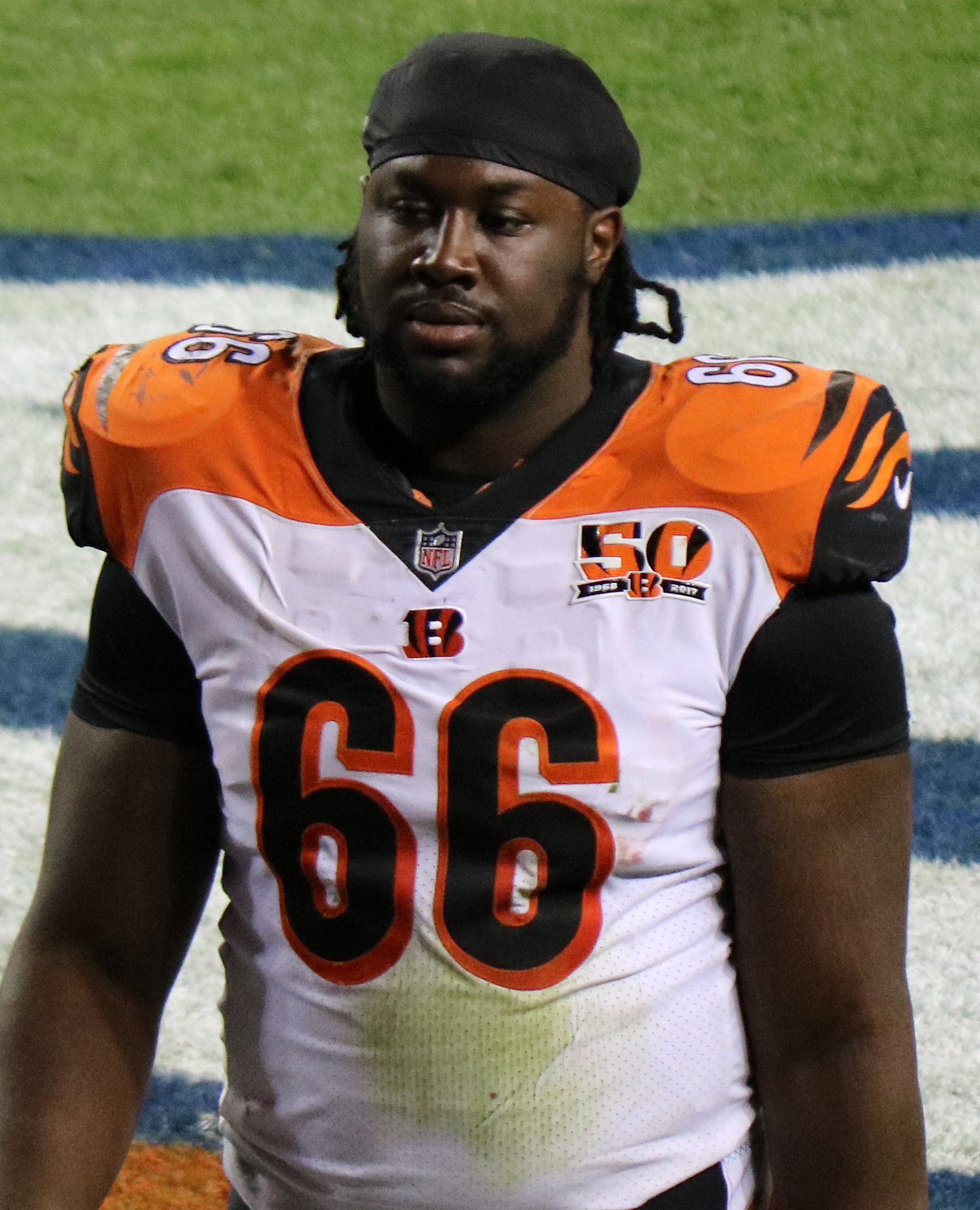
- Hopkins with the Cincinnati Bengals in 2017

No. 66
- Positions: Center, guard

Personal information
- Born: July 6, 1992 (age 34); Houston, Texas, U.S.
- Listed height: 6 ft 3 in (1.91 m)
- Listed weight: 316 lb (143 kg)

Career information
- High school: North Shore (Cloverleaf, Texas)
- College: Texas
- NFL draft: 2014: undrafted

Career history
- Cincinnati Bengals (2014–2021)

Awards and highlights
- First-team All-Big 12 (2013); Second-team All-Big 12 (2012); Holiday Bowl champion (2011); Alamo Bowl champion (2012)

Career NFL statistics
- Games played: 76
- Games started: 67
- Stats at Pro Football Reference

Trey Hopkins (born July 6, 1992) is an American former professional football player who was a center for the Cincinnati Bengals of the National Football League (NFL) and was their starting center in Super Bowl LVI. He played college football for the Texas Longhorns where he was a first-team All-Big 12 selection in his senior year, second-team in is junior year and helped the Longhorns win two bowl games.

== Early life ==
Hopkins attended North Shore High School where he was an All-Area, All-State, and All-American. As well as a two-time first-team All-District performer on the offensive line. He also played in the 2010 U.S. Army All-American Bowl.

As a sophomore, he recorded 36 pancake blocks and 38 knockdowns. He helped North Shore record 363 total yards-per-game, including 207 rushing yards-per-game. He helped the team to a 14-1 record, winning the district championship and a spot in the semifinals of the state playoffs. He was also named second-team All-District. As a junior, he recorded 44 pancake blocks and 40 knockdowns. He helped the team record 376 yards-per-game, including 197 rushing yards-per-game. He again helped the team to a one loss record (9-1), a district championship, and a trip to the state playoffs. For the season, he was named All-state honorable mention from the Associated Press (AP), as well as a first-team All-Greater Houston selection by the Houston Chronicle.

As a senior, he recorded 48 pancake blocks and 36 knockdowns. He helped the team record 361 yards-per-game, including 232 rushing yards-per-game. He helped the team to an 8-4 record and an appearance in the second round of the 5A Division II state playoffs. For the season, he was named first-team All-District 21-5A, as well as being named to the Houston Chronicle's "The Houston 100". He was named to Dave Campbell's third-team Texas Football Super Team. He was a first-team All-Great Houston selection, a member of Rivals.com's top 100, ESPNU's Top 150 National Prospects, #1 guard by Rivals.com, #6 guard by ESPNU. He also won Offensive Player of the Year by the Houston Touchdown Club.

== College career ==
Hopkins then attended the University of Texas. As a freshman in 2010, he appeared in all 12 games (four starts). He started four games in place of an injured Michael Huey. Hopkins helped the Longhorns recorded 382.5 total yards-per-game, including 150.5 rushing yards-per-game. As a sophomore in 2011, he started all 13 games at right tackle. He helped the Longhorns offense rank 21st in the nation in rushing with 202.62 yards-per-game, and average 392.54 total yards-per-game. In 2012 as a junior, he was switched to left guard and started 12 games. He missed the 2012 Alamo Bowl with an injury, snapping his 29-game start streak. He helped the Longhorns rank 23rd in scoring offense averaging 35.7 points-per-game, 40th in totals yards with 434.6 yards-per-game. He also ranked third in the nation, allowing 4.1 tackles-for-loss-per-game and 22nd with 1.23 sacks-per-game. He was named second-team All-Big 12 by the coaches, San Antonio Express-News and the Dallas Morning News. He was an All-league honorable mention by the AP. As a senior in 2013 Texas Longhorns football team, he started all 13 games, 12 at left guard and one at right tackle. He helped the Longhorns offense rank 36th in the nation in rushing with 196.2 yards-per-game. He was a member of an offensive line that gave up just 16 sacks on the season, 17th in the nation. He also helped the team set a school recorded with 715 total yards, 359 rushing yards and 356 passing yards, against New Mexico State. He received the team's Frank Medina Rehabilitation Award along with Jackson Jeffcoat, as well as the D. Harold Byrd Tenacity Award for Offense, along with Mason Walters, Malcolm Brown, and Jaxon Shipley. Hopkins was a first-team All-Big 12 selection by the AP, Sporting News, and ESPN.com. He was a second-team selection by the coaches, Athlon, and the San Antonio Express-News.

== Professional career ==
Pre-draft measurables
Height	Weight	Arm length	Hand span	Wingspan	40-yard dash	10-yard split	20-yard split	20-yard shuttle	Three-cone drill	Broad jump	Bench press
6 ft 2 7/8 in (1.90 m)	307 lb (139 kg)	34 7/8 in (0.89 m)	9 1/2 in (0.24 m)	6 ft 9 1/2 in (2.07 m)	5.24 s	1.81 s	2.97 s	4.74 s	8.06 s	9 ft 2 in (2.79 m)	28 reps
All values from Texas Pro Day

After going undrafted in the 2014 NFL draft, Hopkins signed with the Cincinnati Bengals on May 10, 2014. On August 30, he was placed on injured reserve for the 2014 season with a leg injury.

He was released during final cuts before the 2015 season on September 5, 2015 and was signed to the Bengals' practice squad the next day.

On January 11, 2016, he signed a future contract with the Bengals. He was again waived during the final cut before the 2016 season, on September 3, 2016, but was re-signed two days later. After being inactive for the first game of the season he was released again on September 15 and re-signed to the practice squad. He was promoted back to the active roster on December 31, 2016 and then played in his first game, seeing limited playing time during the last game.

During the 2017 season Hopkins got his first start of the season in week one and then spent three weeks deactivated due to a knee injury before coming back and starting the last 11 games at right guard.

In 2018, Hopkins started nine games, six at center, and one at each guard spot, all in place of injured starters.

On March 8, 2019, the Bengals placed a second-round restricted free agent tender on Hopkins. He was named the starting center in 2019, starting all 16 games.

Following the 2019 season he signed a three-year, $20.4 million contract extension with the Bengals through the 2022 season. Over the next two season, he started in all but 3 games, and was the Bengals starting Center in Super Bowl LVI.

On March 18, 2022, Hopkins was released by the Bengals after the Super Bowl, which the Bengals lost, his last game.

== Personal life ==
He earned his Masters degree from Kelley School of Business at Indiana University Bloomington.
