= 2012 Texas Longhorns football team =

American college football season

2012 Texas Longhorns football

Alamo Bowl champion

Alamo Bowl, W 31–27 vs. Oregon State
- Conference: Big 12 Conference

Ranking
- Coaches: No. 18
- AP: No. 19
- Record: 9–4 (5–4 Big 12)
- Head coach: Mack Brown (15th season)
- Co-offensive coordinators: Major Applewhite (2nd season); Bryan Harsin (2nd season)
- Offensive scheme: Multiple
- Defensive coordinator: Manny Diaz (2nd season)
- Base defense: 4–3
- Home stadium: Darrell K Royal–Texas Memorial Stadium

2012 Big 12 Conference football standings
	Conf.			Overall
Team	W		L	W		L
No. 12 Kansas State $+	8	–	1	11	–	2
No. 15 Oklahoma +	8	–	1	10	–	3
No. 19 Texas	5	–	4	9	–	4
Oklahoma State	5	–	4	8	–	5
Baylor	4	–	5	8	–	5
TCU	4	–	5	7	–	6
Texas Tech	4	–	5	8	–	5
West Virginia	4	–	5	7	–	6
Iowa State	3	–	6	6	–	7
Kansas	0	–	9	1	–	11
$ – BCS representative as conference champion; + – Conference co-champions; Rankings from AP Poll

The 2012 Texas Longhorns football team (variously "Texas," "UT," the "Longhorns," or the "'Horns") represented the University of Texas at Austin in the 2012 NCAA Division I FBS football season. The Longhorns were led by 15th-year head coach Mack Brown and played their home games at Darrell K Royal–Texas Memorial Stadium. They were a member of the Big 12 Conference. They finished the season 9–4, 5–4 in Big 12 play to finish in a tie for third place. They were invited to the Alamo Bowl where they defeated Oregon State.

The team's motto for the season was created by Longhorns players. The motto was R.I.S.E., which stood for words Relentless, Intensity, Sacrifice/Swagger, and Emotion.

== Previous season ==
After the 2010 Texas Longhorns football team finished with the first losing season since 1997, Texas began the 2011 NCAA Division I FBS football season unranked in the preseason Associated Press poll for the first time since 1998, although they ranked 24th in the preseason Coaches' Poll. Texas defeated its first four opponents, including two that they had previously lost to in 2010. Texas would go on a two-game losing skid against top 10 teams Oklahoma and Oklahoma State before winning against Kansas and Texas Tech. The game against Kansas was the first shutout for a Texas football team since beating Baylor 63–0 in 2005. Texas would once again enter a two-game losing skid before beating Texas A&M in the Lone Star Showdown. The Longhorns would lose to Baylor before becoming selected to play in the 2011 Holiday Bowl. Texas would go on to win 21–10 against California, finishing the season with an 8–5 record.

=== Spring game ===
Horns vs. Texas

Team	1	2	3	4	Total
Horns	0	14	7	7	28
• Texas	14	14	7	0	35

- Location: Austin, TX
- Game start: 2:10 pm CST
- Elapsed time: 1:41
- Game attendance: 46,000
- Game weather: 86°F (30°C), mostly cloudy, winds S 15–20 mph
- Referee: Randy Christal
- TV announcers (LHN): Danny Kanell, Lowell Galindo

The annual Texas Orange–White spring game took place on April 1, 2012. However, the teams were named Horns and Texas. Quarterbacks David Ash, Case McCoy, and newly recruited Connor Brewer attempted passes during the game.

The Texas team won the coin toss and elected to receive the kickoff at the beginning of the game. They would eventually score first on a 60–yard run by wide receiver D.J. Monroe. The Texas team would hold the Horns scoreless after scoring two more touchdowns in the first and second quarters. However, the Horns recorded their first touchdown with 5:55 left in the second quarter. The Texas team would answer on special teams after Mykkele Thompson made a touchdown on a 99–yard kickoff return.

After halftime, both Texas and the Horns would each score touchdowns, although Texas would maintain a lead. The final score of the game was on a 1–yard run by Heath Hohmann late in the fourth quarter for the Horns. However, the Horns could not score again, and the Texas team won 35–28.

=== 2012 NFL draft ===
Three Texas players were drafted in the 2012 NFL draft. All players drafted were players on the Texas defense.

2012 NFL draft selections
Round	Pick #	Team	Player	Position
4	119	Washington Redskins	Keenan Robinson	Linebacker
6	204	Cleveland Browns	Emmanuel Acho	Linebacker
7	215	Miami Dolphins	Kheeston Randall	Defensive tackle

Following the draft five 2011 Texas players were signed as undrafted free agents.

Signed as Undrafted Free Agent
Player	Team	Position
Blake Gideon	Arizona Cardinals	Safety
Christian Scott	Tennessee Titans	Safety
Cody Johnson	Tampa Bay Buccaneers	Fullback
David Snow	Buffalo Bills	Offensive linesman
Justin Tucker	Baltimore Ravens	Kicker

== Roster ==
2012 Texas Longhorns football team roster
Players
Coaches
Offense

Pos.	#	Name	Class
WR	1	Mike Davis	So
WR	2	Kendall Sanders	Fr
WR	3	DeSean Hales	Sr
WR	4	Cayleb Jones	Fr
RB	5	Jeremy Hills	Sr
QB	6	Case McCoy	Jr
QB	7	Kris Anderson	Fr
WR	8	Jaxon Shipley	So
WR	9	John Harris	So
WR	11	Jalen Overstreet	Fr
FB	13	Chet Moss	So
QB	14	David Ash	So
QB	15	Trey Holtz	Fr
WR	16	Bryant Jackson	So
WR	17	Miles Onyegbule (injured)	So
TE	18	D.J. Grant	Sr
WR	19	Marcus Johnson	Fr
RB	21	Daje Johnson	Fr
RB	24	Joe Bergeron	So
WR	27	Michael Zaring	Fr
RB	28	Malcolm Brown (injured)	So
WR	29	Jaren Nickleson	Sr
FB	30	Ryan Roberson	Sr
RB	32	Johnathan Gray	Fr
FB	36	Alex De La Torre (injured)	Fr
RB	40	Tate Gresham	So
WR	42	Dakota Haines	Fr
RB	42	Heath Hohmann	So
OL	51	Donald Hawkins	Jr
C	55	Dominic Espinosa	So
OL	56	Drew Russo	So
OL	62	Curtis Riser	Fr
OL	65	Marcus Hutchins	Fr
G	66	Sedrick Flowers	Fr
OL	68	Kennedy Estelle	Fr
OL	71	Camrhon Hughes	Fr
G	72	Mason Walters	Jr
G, C	73	Garrett Porter	Jr
OL	74	Taylor Doyle	Fr
G, OT	75	Trey Hopkins	Jr
OL	76	Garrett Greenlea	Fr
OT	77	Luke Poehlmann	Sr
OT	78	Josh Cochran	So
G	79	Thomas Ashcraft	Jr
TE	80	Jackson Crawley	Sr
TE	81	Greg Daniels	So
TE	82	Trey Graham	Jr
WR	83	Chirs Giron	Jr
TE	83	Trevor Leeson	So
WR	84	Marquise Goodwin	Sr
TE	85	M.J. McFarland	Fr
WR	86	Cade McCary	Jr
TE	89	Barrett Matthews	Sr

Defense

Pos.	#	Name	Class
DE	1	Shiro Davis	Fr
DB	2	Mykkele Thompson	So
LB	3	Jordan Hicks (injured)	Jr
S	4	Kenny Vaccaro	Sr
CB	6	Quandre Diggs	So
LB	7	Demarco Cobbs	Jr
LB	8	Aaron Benson	So
LB	11	Tevin Jackson	So
DB	13	Kevin Vaccaro	Fr
DB	16	Bryson Echols	Fr
CB	17	Adrian Phillips	Jr
LB	19	Peter Jinkens	Fr
DB	21	Duke Thomas	Fr
CB	23	Carrington Byndom	Jr
LB	24	Timothy Cole	Fr
CB	25	Josh Turner	So
DB	26	Adrian Colbert	Fr
S	29	Sheroid Evans	So
CB	30	Ryan Roberts	Fr
CB	31	Leroy Scott	So
S	32	Devin Huffines	Jr
CB	33	Steve Edmond
LB	35	Kendall Thompson	So
DB, DS	37	Nate Boyer	So
DB	38	Ben George	So
S	40	Matthew Zapata	So
LB	41	Holt Pearlman	Fr
DE	42	Caleb Bluiett	Fr
DE	42	Logan Mills	Fr
DE	44	Jackson Jeffcoat	Jr
LB	45	Shawn Izadi	Jr
LB	46	Brad Terry	Sr
DE	47	Chris Terry	Jr
LB	48	Trey Gonzales	Fr
DT	50	Paul Boyette, Jr.	Fr
DE, DS	50	Michael Cruciani	Sr
DE	52	Bryce Cottrell	Fr
LB	55	Dalton Santos	Fr
DE	57	Taylor Silguero	Sr
LB	58	Cody Ramirez	Sr
DT	69	Kyle Kriegel	Jr
DE	80	Alex Okafor	Sr
DE	81	Hassan Ridgeway	Fr
DT	85	Ashton Dorsey	Jr
DL	87	Hasen Zaydon	Fr
DE	88	Cedric Reed	So
DT	90	Malcom Brown	Fr
DE	92	Reggie Wilson	Jr
DT	92	Alex Norman	Fr
DT	94	Chris Whaley	Jr
DT	97	Brandon Moore	Jr
DT	99	Desmond Jackson	So

Special teams

Pos.	#	Name	Class
PK	9	Anthony Fera	Jr
P, PK	14	William Russ	So
P	15	Alex King	Sr
P	15	Alex King	Sr
PK	23	Nick Rose	Fr
PK	28	Nick Jordon	Fr
PK	31	Ben Pruitt	Fr
PK	33	Grant Sirgo	So
PK	35	Michael Davidson	Fr
DS	39	Tom Newman	So
DS	45	Kyle Ashby	Fr

Head coach

- Mack Brown (15th season)

Coordinators/assistant coaches

- Duane Akina – Assistant head coach/defensive backs
- Major Applewhite – Co-offensive coordinator/running backs
- Bruce Chambers – Co-recruiting coordinator/tight ends
- Bo Davis – Defensive tackles
- Manny Diaz – Defensive coordinator/linebackers
- Oscar Giles – Assistant coach/defensive ends
- Bryan Harsin – Co-offensive coordinator/quarterbacks
- Stacy Searels – Offensive line
- Darrell Wyatt – Co-recruiting coordinator/wide receivers
- Jeff Madden – Assistant A.D. for strength & conditioning
- Bennie Wylie – Strength and conditioning head coach for football
- Arthur Johnson – Assistant athletics director for football operations
- Ken Rucker – Dir. of high school relations and player development
- Marcus Tubbs – Director of football operations

Legend

- (C) Team captain
- (S) Suspended
- (I) Ineligible
- Injured
- Redshirt

Roster
Last update: August 5, 2012

=== Recruiting class ===
During the 2011 recruiting period, Texas recruited 18 players, including nine from the 'ESPN 150.' As a result, Texas' recruiting class was ranked third by ESPN, second by Rivals and first by Scout.

College recruiting (2012)
Name	Hometown	School	Height	Weight	40^{‡}	Commit date
Caleb Bluiett; DE	Beaumont, TX	West Brook Senior HS	6 ft 3 in (1.91 m)	235 lb (107 kg)	4.75	Feb 26, 2011
Caleb Bluiett; DE	Recruit ratings: Scout: Rivals: (79)					
Paul Boyette, Jr. DT	Humble, TX	Humble HS	6 ft 4 in (1.93 m)	280 lb (130 kg)	5.0	Feb 26, 2011
Paul Boyette, Jr. DT	Recruit ratings: Scout: Rivals: (80)					
Connor Brewer; QB	Scottsdale, AZ	Chaparral HS	6 ft 2 in (1.88 m)	190 lb (86 kg)	4.7	Feb 7, 2011
Connor Brewer; QB	Recruit ratings: Scout: Rivals: (82)					
Malcom Brown; DT	Brenham, TX	Brenham HS	6 ft 2 in (1.88 m)	280 lb (130 kg)	–	Apr 3, 2011
Malcom Brown; DT	Recruit ratings: Scout: Rivals: (83)					
Adrian Colbert; S	Mineral Wells, TX	Mineral Wells HS	6 ft 1 in (1.85 m)	189 lb (86 kg)	Dec 10, 2011	
Adrian Colbert; S	Recruit ratings: Scout: Rivals: (79)					
Timothy Cole; OBL	Brenham, TX	Brenham HS	6 ft 2 in (1.88 m)	218 lb (99 kg)	4.51	Apr 3, 2011
Timothy Cole; OBL	Recruit ratings: Scout: Rivals: (79)					
Bryce Cottrell; DE	Plano, TX	Plano West Senior HS	6 ft 3 in (1.91 m)	225 lb (102 kg)	4.8	Jan 30, 2012
Bryce Cottrell; DE	Recruit ratings: Scout: Rivals: (74)					
Torshiro Davis; OLB	Shreveport, LA	Woodlawn HS	6 ft 3 in (1.91 m)	217 lb (98 kg)	Feb 1, 2012	
Torshiro Davis; OLB	Recruit ratings: Scout: Rivals: (81)					
Alex De La Torre; MLB	Denton, TX	Billy Ryan HS	6 ft 1 in (1.85 m)	223 lb (101 kg)	4.6	Feb 12, 2011
Alex De La Torre; MLB	Recruit ratings: Scout: Rivals: (79)					
Bryson Echols; CB	DeSoto, TX	DeSoto HS	5 ft 9 in (1.75 m)	165 lb (75 kg)	–	Feb 26, 2011
Bryson Echols; CB	Recruit ratings: Scout: Rivals: (81)					
Kennedy Estelle; OT	Pearland, TX	Glenda Dawson HS	6 ft 6 in (1.98 m)	310 lb (140 kg)	5.2	Jun 5, 2011
Kennedy Estelle; OT	Recruit ratings: Scout: Rivals: (82)					
Johnathan Gray; RB	Aledo, TX	Aledo HS	5 ft 10 in (1.78 m)	190 lb (86 kg)	4.4	Apr 22, 2011
Johnathan Gray; RB	Recruit ratings: Scout: Rivals: (85)					
Donald Hawkins; OT	Senatobia, MS	Northwest Mississippi CC	6 ft 5 in (1.96 m)	318 lb (144 kg)	Dec 7, 2011	
Donald Hawkins; OT	Recruit ratings: Scout: Rivals:					
Camhron Hughes; OT	Killeen, TX	Harker Heights HS	6 ft 6 in (1.98 m)	270 lb (120 kg)	Feb 26, 2011	
Camhron Hughes; OT	Recruit ratings: Scout: Rivals: (79)					
Peter Jinkens; OLB	Dallas, TX	Skyline HS	6 ft 1 in (1.85 m)	210 lb (95 kg)	4.5	Feb 26, 2011
Peter Jinkens; OLB	Recruit ratings: Scout: Rivals: (81)					
Daje Johnson; ATH	Pflugerville, TX	Hendrickson HS	5 ft 10 in (1.78 m)	182 lb (83 kg)	4.34	Jan 28, 2012
Daje Johnson; ATH	Recruit ratings: Scout: Rivals: (80)					
Marcus Johnson; WR	League City, TX	Clear Springs HS	6 ft 1 in (1.85 m)	179 lb (81 kg)	4.41	Dec 4, 2011
Marcus Johnson; WR	Recruit ratings: Scout: Rivals: (78)					
Cayleb Jones; WR	Austin, TX	Austin HS	6 ft 2 in (1.88 m)	195 lb (88 kg)	4.5	Feb 27, 2011
Cayleb Jones; WR	Recruit ratings: Scout: Rivals: (83)					
Nicholas "Nick" Jordan; K	Coppell, TX	Coppell HS	6 ft 1 in (1.85 m)	170 lb (77 kg)	Jun 27, 2011	
Nicholas "Nick" Jordan; K	Recruit ratings: Scout: Rivals: (78)					
Brandon Moore; DT	Scooba, MS	East Mississippi CC	6 ft 7 in (2.01 m)	333 lb (151 kg)	Dec 7, 2011	
Brandon Moore; DT	Recruit ratings: Scout: Rivals:					
Alex Norman; DT	Dallas, TX	Bishop Dunne Catholic School	6 ft 3 in (1.91 m)	280 lb (130 kg)	Feb 12, 2011	
Alex Norman; DT	Recruit ratings: Scout: Rivals: (80)					
Jalen Overstreet; ATH	Dallas, TX	Bishop Dunne Catholic School	6 ft 2 in (1.88 m)	206 lb (93 kg)	4.55	Feb 12, 2011
Jalen Overstreet; ATH	Recruit ratings: Scout: Rivals: (78)					
Hassan Ridgeway; DE	Mansfield, TX	Mansfield HS	6 ft 4 in (1.93 m)	253 lb (115 kg)	5.0	Feb 16, 2011
Hassan Ridgeway; DE	Recruit ratings: Scout: Rivals: (80)					
Curtis Riser; OG	DeSoto, TX	DeSoto HS	6 ft 4 in (1.93 m)	290 lb (130 kg)	–	Feb 13, 2011
Curtis Riser; OG	Recruit ratings: Scout: Rivals: (80)					
Kendall Sanders; CB	Athens, TX	Athens HS	6 ft 0 in (1.83 m)	175 lb (79 kg)	4.39	Dec 2, 2011
Kendall Sanders; CB	Recruit ratings: Scout: Rivals: (80)					
Dalton Santos; MLB	Van, TX	Van HS	6 ft 2 in (1.88 m)	290 lb (130 kg)	4.62	Jan 29, 2012
Dalton Santos; MLB	Recruit ratings: Scout: Rivals: (80)					
Orlando Thomas; CB	Copperas Cove, TX	Copperas Cove HS	5 ft 11 in (1.80 m)	172 lb (78 kg)	4.47	Feb 13, 2011
Orlando Thomas; CB	Recruit ratings: Scout: Rivals: (80)					
Kevin Vaccaro; CB	Brownwood, TX	Brownwood HS	5 ft 9 in (1.75 m)	175 lb (79 kg)	Dec 11, 2011	
Kevin Vaccaro; CB	Recruit ratings: Scout: Rivals: (75)					
Overall recruit ranking: Scout: 3 Rivals: 3 ESPN: 1
‡ Refers to 40-yard dash; Note: In many cases, Scout, Rivals, 247Sports, On3, and ESPN may conflict in their listings of height, weight and 40 time.; In these cases, the average was taken. ESPN grades are on a 100-point scale.; Sources: "Texas Football Commitment List 2012". Rivals.; "Texas College Football Recruiting Commits 2012". Scout.; "Texas Longhorns Commits 2012". ESPN.; "Scout.com Team Recruiting Rankings". Scout.; "2011 Team Ranking". Rivals.com.

== Schedule ==
In 2012, Texas played six home games and five away games, as well as one game played on a neutral site. Texas began their 2012 season against two teams from the Mountain West Conference, Wyoming and New Mexico. Texas then faced Ole Miss, the first time Texas faced a team from the Southeastern Conference (SEC) since the 2010 BCS National Championship Game against Alabama and the first time they faced an SEC team in the regular season since 2008. After Texas' non–conference schedule, the Longhorns entered a bye week before playing a round-robin schedule against teams from the Big 12. Another bye week occurred before the game against TCU. Three football games during the season were broadcast exclusively on the Longhorn Network. As of November 2012, eight games were broadcast nationally, and only one, against Kansas, was broadcast regionally.

Date	Time	Opponent	Rank	Site	TV	Result	Attendance
September 1	7:00 p.m.	Wyoming*	No. 15	Darrell K Royal–Texas Memorial Stadium; Austin, TX	LHN	W 37–17	101,142
September 8	7:00 p.m.	New Mexico*	No. 17	Darrell K Royal–Texas Memorial Stadium; Austin, TX	LHN	W 45–0	100,990
September 15	8:15 p.m.	at Ole Miss*	No. 14	Vaught–Hemingway Stadium; Oxford, MS	ESPN/LHN	W 66–31	61,797
September 29	6:50 p.m.	at Oklahoma State	No. 12	Boone Pickens Stadium; Stillwater, OK	FOX	W 41–36	56,709
October 6	6:00 p.m.	No. 8 West Virginia	No. 11	Darrell K Royal–Texas Memorial Stadium; Austin, TX	FOX	L 45–48	101,851^{A}
October 13	11:00 a.m.	vs. No. 10 Oklahoma	No. 15	Cotton Bowl; Dallas, TX (Red River Rivalry)	ABC	L 21–63	92,500
October 20	7:00 p.m.	Baylor		Darrell K Royal–Texas Memorial Stadium; Austin, TX (rivalry)	ABC	W 56–50	101,353
October 27	11:00 a.m.	at Kansas		Memorial Stadium; Lawrence, KS	FSN	W 21–17	40,097
November 3	2:30 p.m.	at No. 20 Texas Tech		Jones AT&T Stadium; Lubbock, TX (Battle for the Chancellor's Spurs)	ABC/ESPN2	W 31–22	60,879^{B}
November 10	11:00 a.m.	Iowa State	No. 19	Darrell K Royal–Texas Memorial Stadium; Austin, TX	LHN/ABC	W 33–7	100,018
November 22	6:30 p.m.	TCU	No. 18	Darrell K Royal–Texas Memorial Stadium; Austin, TX (rivalry)	ESPN	L 13–20	99,950
December 1	7:00 p.m.	at No. 7 Kansas State	No. 23	Bill Snyder Family Football Stadium; Manhattan, KS	ABC	L 24–42	50,912
December 29	6:45 p.m.	vs. No. 15 Oregon State*		Alamodome; San Antonio, TX (Alamo Bowl)	ESPN	W 31–27	65,277
*Non-conference game; Rankings from AP Poll released prior to the game; All times are in Central time

- ^ADenotes the largest crowd to watch a football game at Darrell K. Royal–Texas Memorial Stadium, set earlier in 2011 in the opening game against Rice, where an attendance of 101,624 was recorded. The record would be topped on September 4, 2016, with a crowd of 102,315 vs. Notre Dame.
- ^BDenotes the largest crowd to watch a football game at Jones AT&T Stadium, set earlier in 2012 against Oklahoma, where an attendance of 60,800 was recorded.

== Game summaries ==
=== Wyoming ===
Wyoming at #15 Texas

Team	1	2	3	4	Total
Wyoming	9	0	0	8	17
• #15 Texas	7	17	7	6	37

- Location: Austin, TX
- Game start: 7:07 pm CST
- Elapsed time: 3:08
- Game attendance: 101,142
- Game weather: 92°F (33°C), fair, winds SE 11–18 mph
- Referee: Dan Romeo
- TV announcers (LHN): Mark Neely, Ray Bentley, and Kaylee Hartung

Scoring summary
1	9:14	WYO	Stuart Williams 33-yard field goal	WYO 0–3
1	5:05	TEX	Joe Bergeron 1-yard run (Nick Jordan kick)	TEX 7–3
1	3:37	WYO	Robert Herron 82-yard pass from Brett Smith (Stuart Williams kick)	WYO 7–9
2	7:20	TEX	Jaxon Shipley 16-yard pass from David Ash (Nick Jordan kick)	TEX 14–9
2	3:44	TEX	D.J. Monroe 7-yard run (Nick Jordan kick)	TEX 21–9
2	0:03	TEX	Nick Jordon 31-yard field goal	TEX 24–9
3	12:39	TEX	Malcolm Brown 1-yard run (Nick Jordon kick)	TEX 31–9
4	9:38	WYO	Robert Herron 22-yard pass from Brett Smith (Dominic Rufran pass from Brett Smith)	TEX 31–17
4	2:57	TEX	Joe Bergeron 17-yard run (Nick Jordan kick blocked)	TEX 37–17

Overall record	Previous meeting	Previous winner
4–0	2010	Texas, 34–7

Leading up to the game Texas was favored to win by 31.5 points.

=== New Mexico ===
New Mexico at #17 Texas

Team	1	2	3	4	Total
New Mexico	0	0	0	0	0
• #17 Texas	7	10	14	14	45

- Location: Austin, TX
- Game start: 7:08 pm CST
- Elapsed time: 3:09
- Game attendance: 100,990
- Game weather: 84°F (33°C), clear skies, winds N 7 mph
- Referee: Rick Loumiet
- TV announcers (LHN): Mark Neely, Ray Bentley, and Kaylee Hartung

Scoring summary
1	8:50	TEX	David Ash 49-yard run (Nick Jordan kick)	TEX 7–0
2	13:03	TEX	Nick Jordan 38-yard field goal	TEX 10–0
2	0:28	TEX	Mike Davis 22-yard pass from David Ash (Nick Jordan kick)	TEX 17–0
3	12:12	TEX	Daje Johnson 45-yard pass from David Ash (Nick Jordan kick)	TEX 24–0
3	5:10	TEX	Joe Bergeron 1-yard run (Nick Jordan kick)	TEX 31–0
4	11:06	TEX	D.J. Monroe 6-yard run (Nick Jordan kick)	TEX 38–0
4	3:02	TEX	M.J McFarland 13-yard pass from Case McCoy (Nick Jordan kick)	TEX 45–0

Overall record	Previous meeting	Previous winner
2–0	1988	Texas, 47–0

=== Ole Miss ===
#14 Texas at Ole Miss

Team	1	2	3	4	Total
• #14 Texas	10	21	21	14	66
Ole Miss	0	10	14	7	31

- Location: Oxford, MS
- Game start: 8:26 pm CST
- Elapsed time: 3:24
- Game attendance: 61,797
- Game weather: 79°F (26°C), fair, winds ENE 7 mph
- Referee: Randy Christal
- TV announcers (ESPN/LHN/Sports USA): Mark Jones, Brock Huard, and Jessica Mendoza (ESPN); Craig Way, Roger Wallace, Rod Babers, and Kaylee Hartung (LHN); Mark Followill and Gary Barnett (Sports USA)

Scoring summary
1	9:41	TEX	Steve Edmond 22-yard interception return (Nick Jordan kick)	TEX 7–0
1	3:01	TEX	Nick Jordan 31-yard field goal	TEX 10–0
2	14:54	MISS	Randall Mackey 3-yard run (Bryson Rose kick)	TEX 10–7
2	13:35	TEX	Marquise Goodwin 69-yard run (Nick Jordan kick)	TEX 17–7
2	8:50	MISS	Bryson Rose 39-yard field goal	TEX 17–10
2	6:34	TEX	D.J. Grant 3-yard pass from David Ash (Nick Jordan kick)	TEX 24–10
2	0:12	TEX	Ryan Roberson 1-yard pass from David Ash (Nick Jordan kick)	TEX 31–10
3	11:40	TEX	D.J. Monroe 10-yard run (Nick Jordan kick)	TEX 38–10
3	10:39	MISS	Dante Moncrief 75-yard pass from Bo Wallace (Bryson Rose kick)	TEX 38–17
3	6:51	TEX	Malcolm Brown 5-yard run (Nick Jordan kick)	TEX 45–17
3	4:41	MISS	Jeff Scott 48-yard run (Bryson Rose kick)	TEX 45–24
3	2:30	TEX	Mike Davis 46-yard pass from David Ash (Nick Jordan kick)	TEX 52–24
4	14:23	TEX	Malcolm Brown 12-yard run (Nick Jordan kick)	TEX 59–24
4	14:05	MISS	Jaylen Walton 100-yard kickoff return (Bryson Rose kick)	TEX 59–31
4	11:27	TEX	Marquise Goodwin 55-yard pass from David Ash (Nick Jordan kick)	TEX 66–31

Overall record	Previous meeting	Previous winner
5–1	1966	Texas, 19–0

=== Oklahoma State ===
#12 Texas at Oklahoma State

Team	1	2	3	4	Total
• #12 Texas	21	0	7	13	41
Oklahoma State	14	3	9	10	36

- Location: Stillwater, OK
- Game start: 6:50 pm CST
- Elapsed time: 3:28
- Game attendance: 56,709
- Game weather: 73°F (23°C), cloudy, winds ENE 6 mph
- Referee: Tom Walker
- TV announcers (FOX/Compass Media): Gus Johnson, Charles Davis, and Julie Alexandria (FOX); Gregg Daniels and Dale Hellestrae (Compass Media)

Scoring summary
1	14:21	OSU	Joseph Randle 69-yard run (Quinn Sharp kick)	OSU 0–7
1	9:10	TEX	Jaxon Shipley 44-yard pass from David Ash (Nick Jordan kick)	7–7
1	7:31	TEX	Jaxon Shipley 20-yard pass from David Ash (Nick Jordan kick)	TEX 14–7
1	2:00	OSU	Josh Stewart 44-yard pass from J. W. Walsh (Quinn Sharp kick)	14–14
1	1:47	TEX	D.J. Monroe 100-yard kickoff return (Nick Jordan kick)	TEX 21–14
2	12:34	OSU	Quinn Sharp 23-yard field goal	TEX 21–17
3	6:52	OSU	Quinn Sharp 38-yard field goal	TEX 21–20
3	0:43	TEX	Jaxon Shipley 7-yard pass from David Ash (Nick Jordan kick)	TEX 28–20
3	0:19	OSU	John Goodlet 20-yard pass from J.W. Walsh (Two–point conversion failed)	TEX 28–26
4	9:36	OSU	Joseph Randle 2-yard run (Quinn Sharp kick)	OSU 28–33
4	5:48	TEX	Joe Bergeron 1-yard run (Two–point conversion failed)	TEX 34–33
4	2:34	OSU	Quinn Sharp 24-yard field goal	OSU 34–36
4	0:29	TEX	Joe Bergeron 2-yard run (Nick Jordan kick)	TEX 41–36

Overall record	Previous meeting	Previous winner
22–4	2011	Oklahoma State, 26–38

=== West Virginia ===
#8 West Virginia at #11 Texas

Team	1	2	3	4	Total
• #8 West Virginia	14	13	7	14	48
#11 Texas	7	21	10	7	45

- Location: Austin,
  TX
- Game start: 6:00 pm CST
- Elapsed time: 3:32
- Game attendance: 101,851
- Game weather: 66°F (23°C), cloudy, winds N 10-15 mph
- Referee: Greg Burks
- TV announcers (FOX/ESPN Radio): Gus Johnson, Charles Davis, and Julie Alexandria (FOX); Mark Neely, Ray Bentley, and Owen Fitzsimmons (ESPN Radio)

Overall record	Previous meeting	Previous winner
0–1	1956	West Virginia, 6–7

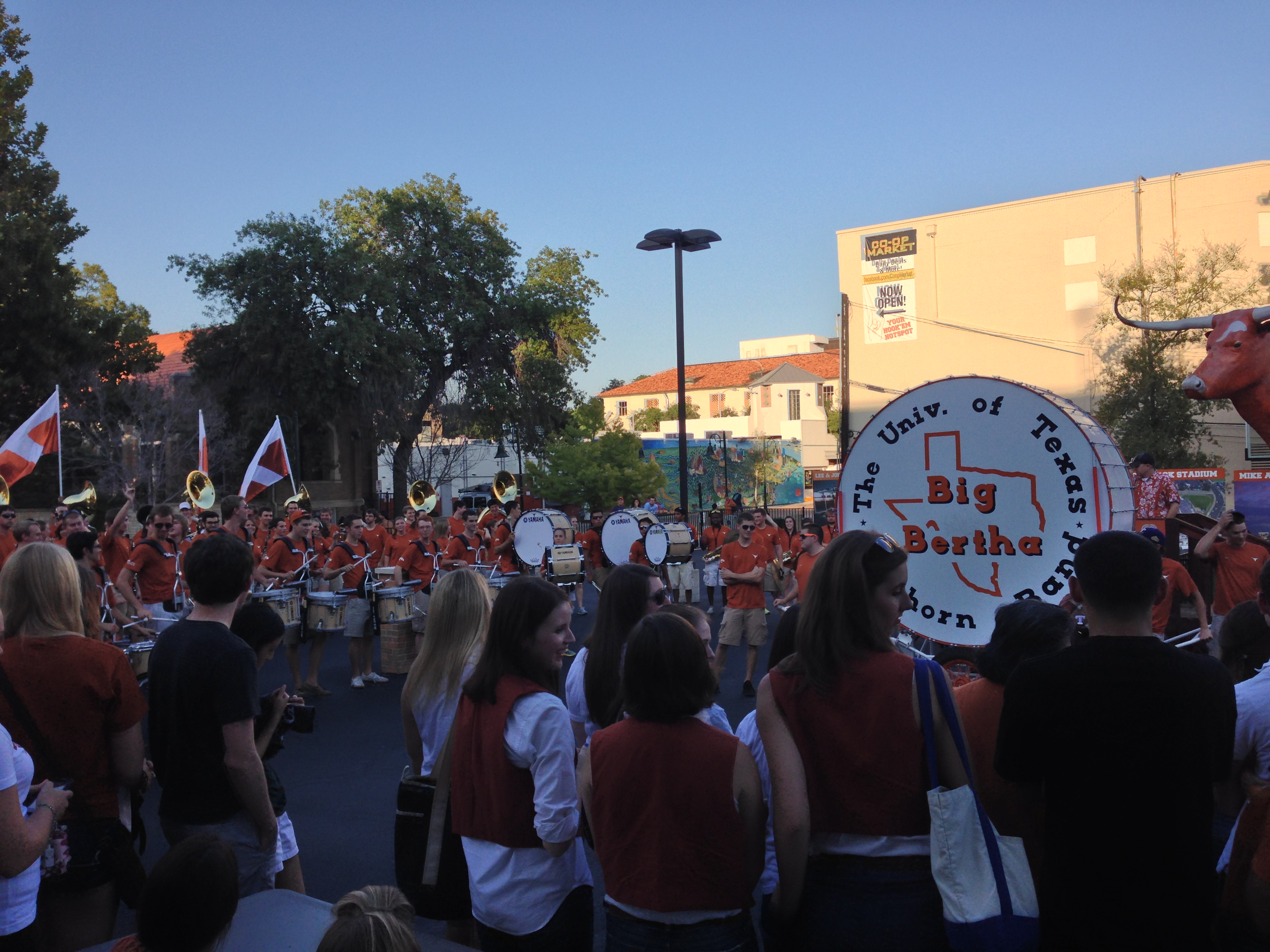
Texas fans and the Showband of the Southwest at a pep rally prior to the game

Before the game, Texas was favored to win by 6.5 points over West Virginia. It was the first game against a top–10 opponent in either the AP Poll or Coaches' Poll since losing to Oklahoma State in 2011. Leading up to the game both teams were undefeated with 4–0 records, and this game was West Virginia's first road game as a Big 12 member. It was announced that kicker Anthony Fera, who had transferred to Texas before the season, would be playing after being sidelined during the start of the season because of a groin injury. Darrell K. Royal–Texas Memorial Stadium saw a record attendance of 101,851, eclipsing the record set by a game against Rice in 2011.

Former Texas quarterback Vince Young, who attended the game, was the honorary team captain. Marquise Goodwin, Carrington Byndom, and D.J. Monroe were team captains for the offense, defense, and special teams, respectively.

At the start of the game Texas won the coin toss, but elected to defer, selecting to kickoff at the start of the game. The kickoff by kicker Nick Rose was returned 44 yards by Tavon Austin to start the game. On their opening drive, West Virginia drove down the field to score the first touchdown of the game on an eight-yard pass from leading Heisman Trophy candidate quarterback Geno Smith to wide receiver Stedman Bailey. Texas responded on a two-yard rushing touchdown by Joe Bergeron, tying the game at 7–7. After the scores both teams were held scoreless on their subsequent drives. A 42–yard field goal by West Virginia kicker Tyler Bitancurt was blocked by Alex Okafor, and Texas failed to convert on fourth down on the following drive, resulting in a turnover on downs. West Virginia scored again after Geno Smith threw a 40–yard touchdown pass, this time to Tavon Austin, to let the Mountaineers lead 14–7 to end the first quarter. West Virginia scored once again to open the second quarter, this time on a rushing touchdown, to extend the Mountaineer lead to 21–7. After Marquise Goodwin lost a fumble, Texas cornerback Carrington Byndom was able to block a subsequent punt by West Virginia. Texas was able to capitalize on the blocked punt to score a touchdown and close the lead to 21–14. On the following drive, Mountaineer quarterback Geno Smith fumbled near the goal line, which was recovered by Jackson Jeffcoat and leading to a defensive touchdown, tying the game once again at 21–21. To close out the first half of play West Virginia was able to score two field goals, but the Longhorns were able to score a touchdown. Texas led at halftime 28–27.

Anthony Fera scored his first field goal under the Texas Longhorns football team at the end of a drive to begin the first quarter. However, on the subsequent drive West Virginia scored another touchdown, once again on a catch by Stedman Bailey, to reclaim the lead 34–31. Following the receiving touchdown Texas was able to respond with a four-yard touchdown run by Joe Bergeron, his fourth rushing touchdown of the game. Geno Smith connected with Stedman Bailey again for another touchdown catch, this time for six yards to give West Virginia the lead once again at 41–38 to start the fourth quarter. On the next drive the Longhorns were unable to score a touchdown. On the next drive Geno Smith lost his second fumble of the game, allowing Texas to start with good field position. However, a bad snap by center Dominique Espinosa forced Texas back further from the goal line. On the following attempted field goal, Anthony Fera missed wide–right. West Virginia took the opportunity to extend their lead with a 5–yard touchdown by Andrew Buie to lead 48–38. With just over a minute in the game, Texas was able to score with 15 seconds remaining on an eight-yard pass from David Ash to Marquise Goodwin to make the score 48–45. Texas was unable to recover the ensuing onside kick, allowing West Virginia to run out the clock and win the game.

Texas runningback Joe Bergeron recorded a career-high four rushing touchdowns, which accounted for four out of five offensive touchdowns by Texas. It was the first time at least four rushing touchdowns were scored by a Longhorns player since Vince Young did so in the 2005 Rose Bowl. After the loss, Texas moved down to 15th in both the Associated Press Poll and Coaches' Poll.

=== Oklahoma ===
#15 Texas vs. #10 Oklahoma

Team	1	2	3	4	Total
#15 Texas	2	0	6	13	21
• #10 Oklahoma	13	23	10	17	63

- Location: Dallas, TX
- Game start: 11:08 am CST
- Elapsed time: 3:54
- Game attendance: 92,500
- Game weather: 77°F (23°C), Overcast, winds S 15 mph
- Referee: Mike Defee
- TV announcers (ABC/ Compass Media Networks): Brad Nessler, Todd Blackledge, and Holly Rowe (ABC); Drew Bontadelli and Tony Hill (Compass Media)

Overall record	Previous meeting	Previous winner
59–42–5	2011	Oklahoma, 17–55

=== Baylor ===
Baylor at Texas

Team	1	2	3	4	Total
Baylor	21	10	12	7	50
• Texas	14	28	7	7	56

- Location: Austin, TX
- Game start: 7:12 pm CST
- Elapsed time: 3:32
- Game attendance: 101,353
- Game weather: 84°F (29°C), clear, winds S 5-10 mph
- Referee: Dan Romeo
- TV announcers (ABC): Sean McDonough, Chris Spielman, and Quint Kessenich

Overall record	Previous meeting	Previous winner
73–24–4	2011	Baylor, 24–48

=== Kansas ===
Texas at Kansas

Team	1	2	3	4	Total
• Texas	7	0	0	14	21
Kansas	0	14	0	3	17

- Location: Memorial Stadium, Lawrence, Kansas
- Game start: 11:06 am CST
- Elapsed time: 2:59
- Game attendance: 40,097
- Game weather: 41°F (5°C), clear, winds ENE 4 mph
- Referee: Scott Novak
- Television network: FSN

Scoring summary
1	10:53	TEX	Joe Bergeron 3-yard run (Anthony Fera kick)	TEX 7–0
2	12:06	KU	Christian Matthews 15-yard run (Nick Prolago kick)	Tied 7–7
2	7:16	KU	Tony Pierson 11-yard run (Nick Prolago kick)	KU 14–7
4	9:41	TEX	Marquise Goodwin 11-yard run (Anthony Fera kick)	Tied 14–14
4	2:28	KU	Nick Prolago 29-yard field goal	KU 17–14
4	0:12	TEX	D.J. Grant 1-yard pass from Case McCoy (Anthony Fera kick)	TEX 21–17

Overall record	Previous meeting	Previous winner
9–2	2011	Texas, 43–0

=== Texas Tech ===
Texas at #20 Texas Tech

Team	1	2	3	4	Total
• Texas	14	10	0	7	31
#20 Texas Tech	7	6	9	0	22

- Location: Lubbock, TX
- Game start: 2:35 pm CST
- Elapsed time: 3:13
- Game attendance: 60,879
- Game weather: 63°F (17°C), partly cloudy, winds ENE 5 mph
- Referee: Reggie Smith
- Television network: ABC

Overall record	Previous meeting	Previous winner
46–15	2011	Texas, 52–20

=== Iowa State ===
Iowa State at #19 Texas

Team	1	2	3	4	Total
Iowa State	0	7	0	0	7
• #19 Texas	14	6	3	10	33

- Location: Austin, TX
- Game start: 11:08 a.m.
- Elapsed time: 3:11
- Game attendance: 100,018
- Game weather: 78°F (26°C), partly cloudy, winds S 15–20 mph
- Referee: Greg Burks
- TV announcers (LHN): Mark Neely, Ray Bentley, and Kaylee Hartung

Overall record	Previous meeting	Previous winner
8–1	2011	Texas, 34–14

=== TCU ===
TCU at #18 Texas

Team	1	2	3	4	Total
• TCU	7	7	3	3	20
#18 Texas	3	0	3	7	13

- Location: Austin, TX
- Game start: 6:30
- Game attendance: 99,950
- TV announcers (ESPN): Rece Davis, Jesse Palmer, David Pollack & Samantha Steele

Overall record	Previous meeting	Previous winner
61–20–1	2007	Texas, 34–13

=== Kansas State ===
#23 Texas at #7 Kansas State

Team	1	2	3	4	Total
#23 Texas	0	10	7	7	24
• #7 Kansas State	7	0	7	28	42

- Location: Manhattan, KS
- TV announcers (Brad Nessler, Todd Blackledge & Holly Rowe): ABC

Overall record	Previous meeting	Previous winner
5–7	2011	Kansas State, 13–17

=== Oregon State ===
Texas vs #15 Oregon State

Team	1	2	3	4	Total
• Texas	3	7	7	14	31
#15 Oregon State	10	10	7	0	27

- Location: San Antonio, TX

Overall record	Previous meeting	Previous winner
2–0	1987	Texas, 61–16

== Rankings ==
Ranking movements Legend: ██ Increase in ranking ██ Decrease in ranking RV = Received votes
	Week															
Poll	Pre	1	2	3	4	5	6	7	8	9	10	11	12	13	14	Final
AP	15	17	14	12	12	11	15	RV	RV	RV	19	18	18	23	RV	19
Coaches	15	15	12	10	10	9	15	RV	24	22	17	15	15	21	25	18
Harris	Not released						15	25	24	22	17	15	17	20	24	Not released
BCS	Not released							25	23	23	17	15	16	18	23	Not released
