= Malcom Brown =

American football player (born 1994)

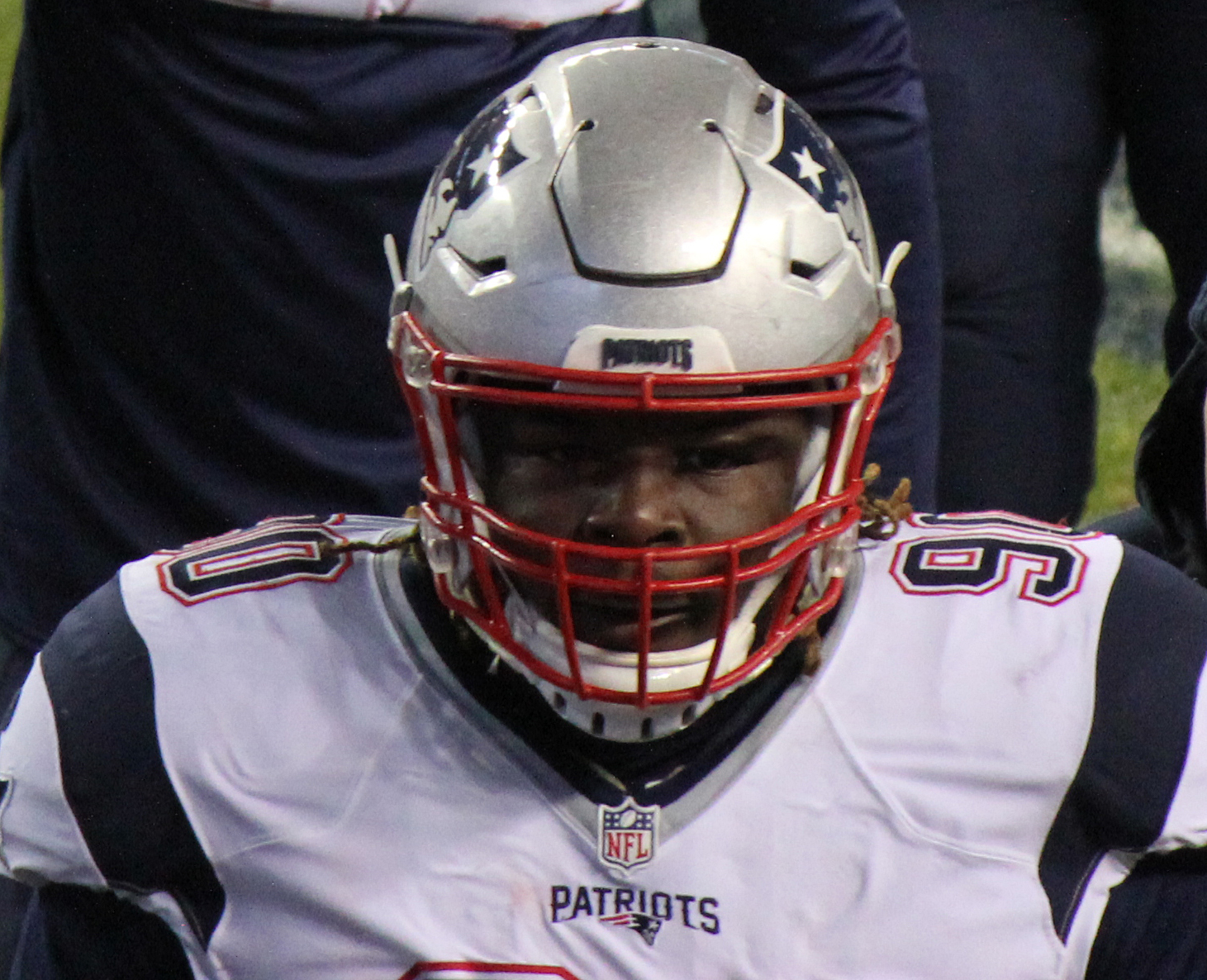
- Brown with the New England Patriots in 2015

No. 90, 98
- Position: Defensive tackle

Personal information
- Born: February 2, 1994 (age 32); Brenham, Texas, U.S.
- Listed height: 6 ft 2 in (1.88 m)
- Listed weight: 330 lb (150 kg)

Career information
- High school: Brenham
- College: Texas (2012–2014)
- NFL draft: 2015: 1st round, 32nd overall pick

Career history
- New England Patriots (2015–2018); New Orleans Saints (2019–2020); Jacksonville Jaguars (2021)

Awards and highlights
- 2× Super Bowl champion (LI, LIII); PFWA All-Rookie Team (2015); Consensus All-American (2014); Big 12 Defensive Player of the Year; First-team All-Big 12 (2014); Under Armour All-American (2012)

Career NFL statistics
- Total tackles: 304
- Sacks: 13.5
- Forced fumbles: 1
- Fumble recoveries: 4
- Pass deflections: 2
- Stats at Pro Football Reference

Malcom D'Shawn Brown (born February 2, 1994) is an American former professional football player who was a defensive tackle in the National Football League (NFL). He played college football for the Texas Longhorns and was selected by the New England Patriots in the first round of the 2015 NFL draft.

== Early life ==
Brown attended Brenham High School in Brenham, Texas, where he was a three-sport athlete in football, basketball and track. A three-year starter, he recorded 125 tackles and 24 sacks during his high school football career. He also threw the shot put (top-throw of 48-8 or 14.91 meters) on the track team. Brown was regarded as a five-star recruit by Rivals.com and was ranked as the fifth-best defensive tackle and the 26th-best player overall in his class.

College recruiting
Name	Hometown	School	Height	Weight	40^{‡}	Commit date
Malcom Brown; DT	Brenham, Texas	Brenham HS	6 ft 3 in (1.91 m)	280 lb (130 kg)	4.8	Apr 3, 2011
Malcom Brown; DT	Recruit ratings: Scout: Rivals: (84)					
Overall recruit ranking: Scout: 17 Rivals: 26 ESPN: 12
Note: In many cases, Scout, Rivals, 247Sports, On3, and ESPN may conflict in their listings of height and weight.; In these cases, the average was taken. ESPN grades are on a 100-point scale.; Sources: "Texas Football Commitments". Rivals.; "2012 Texas Football Commits". Scout.; "ESPN". ESPN.; "Scout.com Team Recruiting Rankings". Scout.; "2012 Team Ranking". Rivals.com.

== College career ==
Brown played in all 13 games as a true freshman at the University of Texas at Austin in 2012, recording 25 tackles. He took over as a starter his sophomore year in 2013, starting all 13 games. He finished the year with 68 tackles and two sacks, and won the team's Joseph W. Moore Tenacity Award for Defense along with Jackson Jeffcoat.

Brown remained a starter his junior season in 2014. He finished the season with 70 tackles, 13 tackles for loss, and 6.5 sacks and was a first-team All-Big 12 Conference selection by The Associated Press and the league's coaches. He also received consensus All-American honors, and was named a finalist for the Bronko Nagurski Trophy (given to the best defensive player in college football), and the Outland Trophy. Brown finished the year as the Longhorns' season leader in tackles for loss, sacks, and forced fumbles.

After his junior season, Brown decided to forgo his senior year in an effort to declare for the 2015 NFL draft.

== Professional career ==
Pre-draft measurables
Height	Weight	Arm length	Hand span	40-yard dash	10-yard split	20-yard split	20-yard shuttle	Three-cone drill	Vertical jump	Broad jump	Bench press
6 ft 2 3/8 in (1.89 m)	319 lb (145 kg)	32 1/2 in (0.83 m)	10 in (0.25 m)	5.05 s	1.75 s	2.94 s	4.59 s	7.84 s	29 1/2 in (0.75 m)	8 ft 2 in (2.49 m)	26 reps
All values from NFL Combine

=== New England Patriots ===
==== 2015 season ====
Brown was selected in the first round with the 32nd overall pick by the New England Patriots in the 2015 NFL Draft. He was the second defensive tackle to be selected, only behind Danny Shelton (No. 12, Cleveland Browns). In addition, he was the first of five Texas Longhorns to be selected in 2015.

On June 19, 2015, the Patriots signed Brown to a four-year, $7.61 million contract with $6.14 million guaranteed and a signing bonus of $3.79 million.

On September 10, 2015, Brown made his regular season debut against the Pittsburgh Steelers and recorded his first NFL sack when he tackled wide receiver Antonio Brown, who was part of an attempted double pass by the Steelers. He finished his rookie season with 48 tackles (9th on the team) and 3.0 sacks (6th on the team). He was named to the PFWA All-Rookie Team.

==== 2016 season ====
In Week 14, Brown recorded his first career safety in a 30–23 win over the Baltimore Ravens. He finished the regular season playing in all 16 games with 13 starts recording 50 tackles and three sacks. The Patriots finished the regular season with a 14–2 record.

On February 5, 2017, Brown was part of the Patriots team that won Super Bowl LI. In the game, he recorded one tackle as the Patriots defeated the Atlanta Falcons by a score of 34–28 in overtime.

==== 2017 season ====
Brown finished his third season with 49 total tackles and 2.5 sacks in 13 games. Brown helped the Patriots reach Super Bowl LII, but the team failed to repeat as Super Bowl Champions after losing 41–33 to the Philadelphia Eagles. Brown recorded six tackles in the Super Bowl.

==== 2018 season ====
On May 2, 2018, the Patriots declined the fifth-year option on Brown's contract, making him a free agent at the end of the 2018 season. He started the offseason on the Physically Unable to Perform (PUP) list, but only missed one week of the season (in October) due to his ankle injury. Brown finished the season with 39 tackles, one fumble recovery, one quarterback hit, and won his second Super Bowl ring after the Patriots beat the Los Angeles Rams 13–3 in Super Bowl LIII. Brown had two total tackles in the game.

=== New Orleans Saints ===
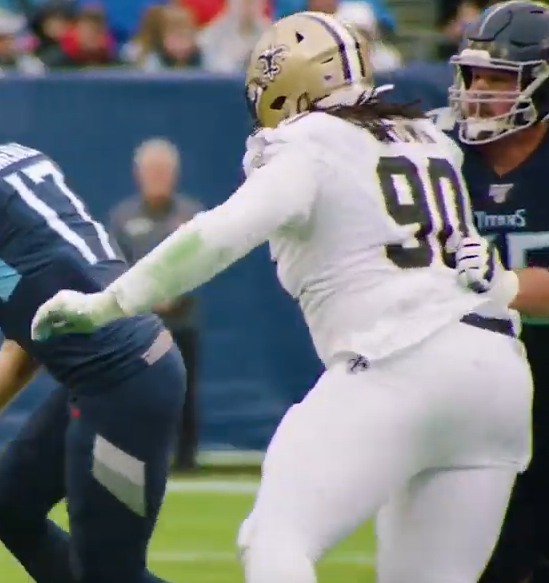
Brown in a game against the Tennessee Titans

On March 14, 2019, Brown signed a three-year, $15 million contract with the New Orleans Saints. Brown finished the season with 32 total tackles, four quarterback hits, 1.5 sacks, one pass defended and one fumble recovery.

In Week 9 of the 2020 season against the Tampa Bay Buccaneers, Brown recorded a sack on his former Patriots teammate Tom Brady during the 38–3 win. In the 2020 season, Brown appeared in 13 games and had one sack and 27 total tackles.

=== Jacksonville Jaguars ===
On March 17, 2021, Brown was traded to the Jacksonville Jaguars and signed a new two-year, $11 million contract. In the 2021 season, Brown had two sacks, 57 total tackles, and one pass defended. He started all 17 games.

On August 17, 2022, Brown was released by Jacksonville.

== Career statistics ==
=== NFL ===
Legend
	Won the Super Bowl
	Led the league
**Bold**	Career high

==== Regular season ====
Year	Team	Games		Tackles					Interceptions						Fumbles			
Year	Team	GP	GS	Cmb	Solo	Ast	Sck	Sfty	PD	Int	Yds	Avg	Lng	TD	FF	FR	Yds	TD
2015	NE	16	12	48	**31**	17	**3.0**	0	0	0	0	0.0	0	0	0	**2**	0	0
2016	NE	16	13	50	24	26	**3.0**	**1**	0	0	0	0.0	0	0	**1**	0	0	0
2017	NE	13	12	49	29	20	2.5	0	0	0	0	0.0	0	0	0	0	0	0
2018	NE	15	14	39	19	20	0.0	0	0	0	0	0.0	0	0	0	1	0	0
2019	NO	16	16	34	18	16	2.0	0	**1**	0	0	0.0	0	0	0	1	0	0
2020	NO	13	13	27	9	18	1.0	0	0	0	0	0.0	0	0	0	0	0	0
2021	JAX	**17**	**17**	**57**	30	**27**	2.0	0	**1**	0	0	0.0	0	0	0	0	0	0
Career		106	97	304	160	144	13.5	1	2	0	0	0.0	0	0	1	4	0	0

==== Postseason ====
Year	Team	Games		Tackles					Interceptions						Fumbles			
Year	Team	GP	GS	Cmb	Solo	Ast	Sck	Sfty	PD	Int	Yds	Avg	Lng	TD	FF	FR	Yds	TD
2015	NE	2	2	6	2	4	0.0	0	0	0	0	0.0	0	0	0	0	0	0
2016	NE	**3**	**3**	11	5	**6**	**1.0**	0	0	0	0	0.0	0	0	0	0	0	0
2017	NE	**3**	**3**	**12**	**6**	**6**	0.0	0	0	0	0	0.0	0	0	0	0	0	0
2018	NE	**3**	2	4	1	3	0.0	0	0	0	0	0.0	0	0	0	0	0	0
2019	NO	1	1	2	0	2	0.5	0	0	0	0	0.0	0	0	0	0	0	0
2020	NO	2	2	3	2	1	0.0	0	0	0	0	0.0	0	0	0	0	0	0
Career		14	13	38	16	22	1.5	0	0	0	0	0.0	0	0	0	0	0	0

=== College ===
Year	School	Conf	Class	Pos	Tackles					Fumbles			
Year	School	Conf	Class	Pos	**Solo**	**Ast**	**Tot**	**Loss**	**Sk**	**FR**	**Yds**	**TD**	**FF**
2012	Texas	Big 12	FR	DL	7	10	17	2.0	0.0	0	0	0	0
2013	Texas	Big 12	SO	DT	3	4	7	1.0	0.0	0	0	0	0
2014	Texas	Big 12	JR	DT	38	32	70	13.0	6.5	1	0	0	2
**Career**	**Texas**				**48**	**46**	**94**	**16.0**	**6.5**	**1**	**0**	**0**	**2**

== Coaching career ==
In 2024, Brown became the head football coach at St. Dominic Savio Catholic High School in Austin, Texas.

== See also ==
- List of Texas Longhorns football All-Americans
- List of New England Patriots first-round draft picks
