= Malcolm Brown (American football) =

American football player (born 1993)

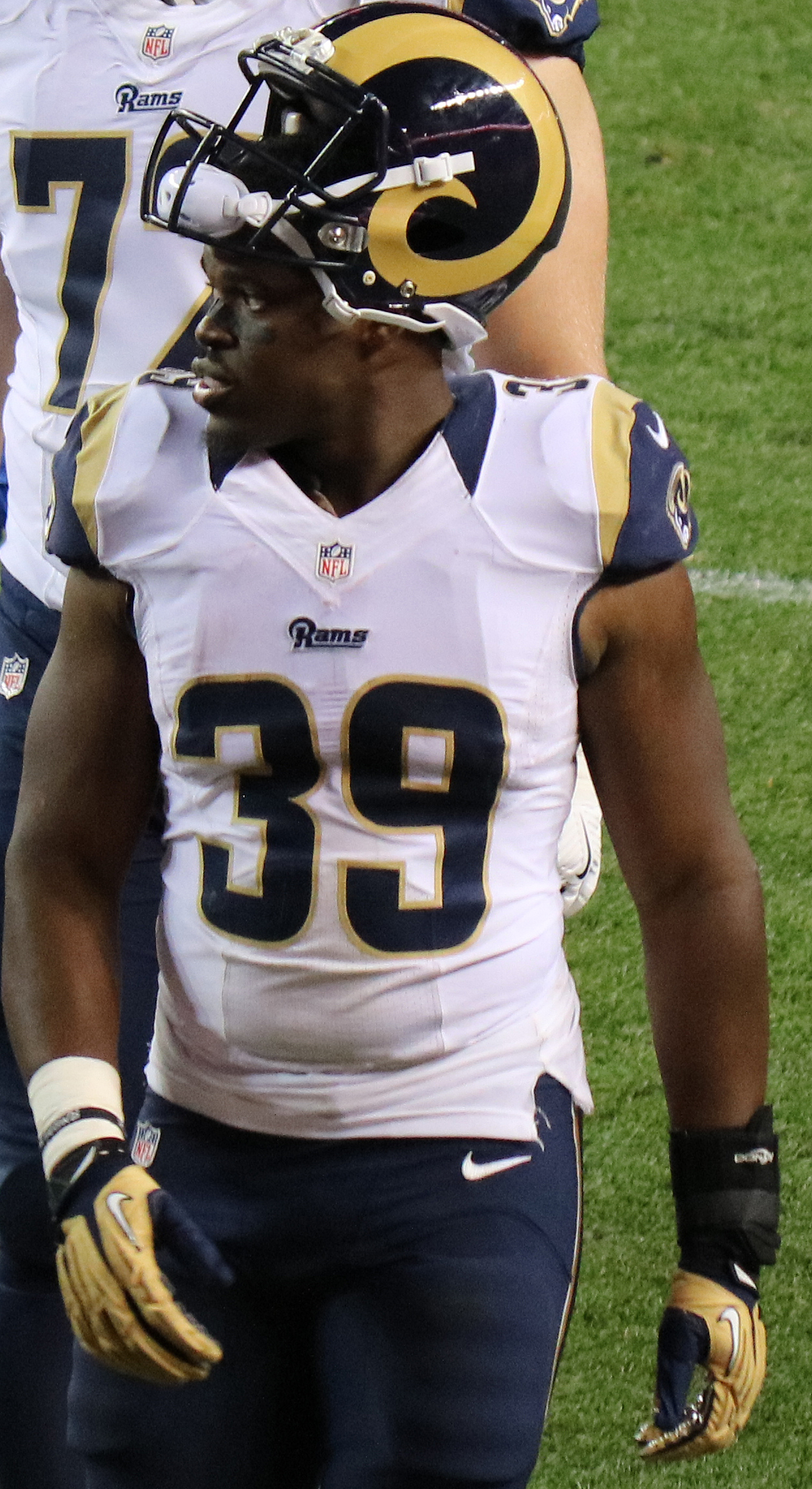
- Brown with the Los Angeles Rams in 2016

No. 39, 34, 41
- Position: Running back

Personal information
- Born: May 15, 1993 (age 33); Biloxi, Mississippi, U.S.
- Listed height: 5 ft 11 in (1.80 m)
- Listed weight: 225 lb (102 kg)

Career information
- High school: Byron P. Steele (Cibolo, Texas)
- College: Texas (2011–2014)
- NFL draft: 2015: undrafted

Career history
- St. Louis / Los Angeles Rams (2015–2020); Miami Dolphins (2021); New Orleans Saints (2022)*; Los Angeles Rams (2022)
- * Offseason or practice squad member only

Awards and highlights
- 2× Second-team All-Big 12 (2013, 2014); Big 12 Offensive Newcomer of the Year (2011); Big 12 Newcomer of the Year (2011); Second-team Freshman All-American (2011)

Career NFL statistics
- Rushing yards: 1,394
- Rushing average: 4
- Rushing touchdowns: 13
- Receptions: 51
- Receiving yards: 374
- Receiving touchdowns: 1
- Stats at Pro Football Reference

Malcolm Brown (born May 15, 1993) is an American former professional football player who was a running back in the National Football League (NFL). He played college football for the Texas Longhorns where he twice a second-team all-Big 12 selection and was the 2011 Big 12 Newcomer of the Year. He was signed by the St. Louis Rams as an undrafted free agent in 2015, and has also played for Miami Dolphins.

== Early life ==
The son of a military family, Brown attended the newly opened Byron P. Steele II High School in Cibolo, Texas, a suburb northeast of San Antonio, Texas, and coached by Mike Jinks. After running for 2,192 yards and 24 touchdowns as a junior, Brown set a school record (which still stands) of 2,596 yards and 30 touchdowns in his senior year, leading Steele to their first-ever Class 5A Division II state championship. He earned a 2010 USA Today High School All-American nomination and played in the 2011 U.S. Army All-American Bowl.

Brown was also a four-year letterman in track & field and played basketball as a freshman. He was a state qualifier as a sophomore and regional qualifier as a junior in the 4 × 200m relay. He also had personal-bests of 11.54 seconds in the 100-meter dash and 22.78 seconds in the 200-meter dash.

Regarded as a five-star recruit by Rivals.com, Brown was listed as the No. 1 running back prospect in the class of 2011. Brown chose the University of Texas over Oklahoma, Florida State, Alabama, Notre Dame, and Stanford.

== College career ==
=== 2011 season ===
Brown started the season third on the depth chart behind running backs Fozzy Whittaker and Cody Johnson. He made his first appearance as a Texas Longhorn in the third quarter against the Rice Owls on September 3. Brown led the Longhorns in rushing that game with 86 yards on 16 carries. The next game, against the BYU Cougars, he led the Longhorns again with 68 yards on 14 carries and whose 14 yard run on third and 8 sealed the 17–16 win. On September 17, Brown had his first 100-yard game as he ran for 110 yards on 22 carries and a 16-yard touchdown as he helped the Longhorns defeat the UCLA Bruins 49–20. Brown led the Longhorns in rushing the next 2 games with 63 yards against Iowa State and 54 yards against Oklahoma.

Brown's other breakout performances occurred against Oklahoma State and Kansas. On October 15, he ran for 135 yards on 19 carries and 2 touchdowns in a losing effort to the Cowboys, averaging over seven yards per carry. On October 29, he ran 28 times for 119 yards and 2 touchdowns, helping the Longhorns shutout the Jayhawks, 43–0. However, Brown suffered a foot injury against the Jayhawks and did not play the next two games against Texas Tech and Missouri or the final game of the regular season against the Baylor Bears.

After the injury, Brown's performance declined, rushing for only 33, 39, and 35 yards against Kansas State, Texas A&M, and California, respectively. Brown still finished the season as the Longhorns' leading rusher with 742 yards on 172 carries and 5 touchdowns. He was the first true freshman to lead Texas in rushing since Cedric Benson in 2001, and his 74.2 yards per game was second among true freshmen. He was named second-team Freshman All-American by Yahoo! Sports.

=== 2012 season ===
Brown shared the Longhorns backfield with Johnathan Gray and Joe Bergeron in the 2012 season. On September 1, against Wyoming, he had 105 rushing yards and a rushing touchdown. On September 15, against Ole Miss, he had 128 rushing yard and two rushing touchdowns. On December 1, against Kansas State, he had 40 rushing yards and a rushing touchdown to go along with six receptions for 43 receiving yards and a receiving touchdown. Overall, he finished the 2012 season with 324 rushing yards, four rushing touchdowns, 15 receptions, 112 receiving yards, and one receiving touchdown.

=== 2013 season ===
Brown led the Longhorns in carries, rushing yards, and rushing touchdowns in the 2013 season. In the season opener against New Mexico State, he had three receptions for 109 receiving yards and a touchdown. On October 12, against Oklahoma, he had 23 carries for 120 rushing yards in the victory. On November 2, against Kansas, he had 119 rushing yards and four rushing touchdowns in the victory. On November 28, against Texas Tech, he had 128 rushing yards in the victory. In the regular season finale at Baylor, he had 131 rushing yards and four receptions for 19 yards and a touchdown in the loss. In the Alamo Bowl against Oregon, he had 130 rushing yards in the 30–7 loss. Overall, in the 2013 season, he had 904 rushing yards, nine rushing touchdowns, 17 receptions, 195 receiving yards, and two receiving touchdowns.

=== 2014 season ===
In the 2014 season, Brown led the Longhorns in carries and rushing yards. In the season opener against North Texas, he had 65 rushing yards and two rushing touchdowns. On October 18, against Iowa State, he had 72 rushing yards and two rushing touchdowns. On November 1, against Texas Tech, he had 116 rushing yards and two rushing touchdowns. Overall, he finished the 2014 season with 708 rushing yards, six rushing touchdowns, and 16 receptions for 58 receiving yards.

=== College statistics ===
Year	School	Pos	G	Rushing				Receiving			
Year	School	Pos	G	Att	Yds	Avg	TD	Rec	Yds	Avg	TD
2011	Texas	RB	10	172	742	4.3	5	3	17	5.7	0
2012	Texas	RB	8	61	324	5.3	4	15	112	7.5	1
2013	Texas	RB	13	214	904	4.2	9	17	195	11.5	2
2014	Texas	RB	13	183	708	3.9	6	16	58	3.6	0
Career				630	2678	4.3	24	51	382	7.5	3

== Professional career ==
Pre-draft measurables
Height	Weight	Arm length	Hand span	40-yard dash	10-yard split	20-yard split	20-yard shuttle	Three-cone drill	Vertical jump	Broad jump	Bench press
5 ft 11 3/8 in (1.81 m)	224 lb (102 kg)	32 3/4 in (0.83 m)	10 1/4 in (0.26 m)	4.51 s	1.53 s	2.62 s	4.15 s	6.86 s	34.5 in (0.88 m)	9 ft 9 in (2.97 m)	19 reps
All values from NFL Combine/Pro Day

=== St. Louis / Los Angeles Rams (first stint) ===
On May 2, 2015, Brown signed with the St. Louis Rams as an undrafted free agent. He was released by the Rams on September 5, 2015, and was signed to the practice squad the next day. On December 31, 2015, Brown was promoted to the 53-man roster. On January 3, 2016, in the regular season finale, he made his NFL debut and had four carries for 17 yards in a 19–16 loss to the San Francisco 49ers. In a backup role in the 2016 season, he had 18 carries for 39 yards and three receptions for 46 yards.

Brown entered the 2017 season as the Rams' No. 2 running back behind Todd Gurley. On September 10, 2017, in the 46–9 victory over the Indianapolis Colts in the season opener, Brown recorded his first career touchdown on a three-yard rush in the fourth quarter. On October 15, against the Jacksonville Jaguars, he had a touchdown on a blocked punt. He earned his first career start in Week 17 in place of Gurley after the Rams decided to rest their starters in preparation for the playoffs. He rushed for 54 yards in the game and caught four passes for seven yards. Overall, he finished the 2017 season with 246 rushing yards, one rushing touchdown, nine receptions, and 53 receiving yards.

On April 16, 2018, Brown signed his ERFA tender for 2018 season. He entered the season as the primary backup to Gurley. He played in 12 games, rushing for 212 yards to go along with five receptions for 52 yards and his first career receiving touchdown. He suffered a clavicle injury in Week 13 and was placed on injured reserve on December 11, 2018. Without Brown, the Rams reached Super Bowl LIII where they lost 13–3 to the New England Patriots.

On March 12, 2019, the Rams tendered Brown as a restricted free agent. On March 19, 2019, the Detroit Lions extended Brown an offer sheet, giving the Rams five days to match or let Brown sign with the Lions. Three days later, the Rams officially matched the Lions offer, signing Brown to a two-year, $3.3 million contract.

In Week 1 of the 2019 season against the Carolina Panthers, Brown rushed 11 times for 53 yards and two touchdowns as the Rams won 30–27. Brown finished the 2019 season with 255 rushing yards and five rushing touchdowns in 14 games.

In Week 1 of the 2020 season, Brown was inserted as the starter after Gurley signed with the Atlanta Falcons. He scored the first touchdown in SoFi Stadium history with a one-yard run in the 20–17 victory over the Dallas Cowboys. Brown totaled 110 scrimmage yards and two rushing touchdowns total in the game. In Week 10 against the Seattle Seahawks, he had six carries for 33 rushing yards and two rushing touchdowns in the 23–16 victory. In the 2020 season, Brown finished with 101 carries for 419 rushing yards and four rushing touchdowns to go along with 23 receptions for 162 receiving yards.

=== Miami Dolphins ===
On March 18, 2021, Brown signed a one-year contract with the Miami Dolphins. He was placed on injured reserve on October 26, 2021. He finished the 2021 season with 33 carries for 125 rushing yards and one rushing touchdown in seven games.

=== New Orleans Saints ===
On July 26, 2022, Brown signed with the New Orleans Saints. He was released on August 10, 2022.

=== Los Angeles Rams (second stint) ===
On September 22, 2022, Brown was signed to the Los Angeles Rams practice squad. He was elevated to the active roster on October 3, 2022, via a standard elevation which caused him to revert back to the practice squad after the game. He was signed to the active roster five days later. He was waived on November 12, 2022. He was re-signed to the practice squad two days later. He was promoted to the active roster on December 17, 2022.
