= Mason Walters =

American football player

Profile
- Position: Guard

Personal information
- Born: Plainview, Texas
- Listed height: 6 ft 6 in (1.98 m)
- Listed weight: 305 lb (138 kg)

Career information
- High school: Wolfforth (TX) Frenship
- College: Texas
- NFL draft: 2014: undrafted

Career history
- N/A

Mason Walters is an American football offensive lineman and is a graduate from the University of Texas at Austin. Walters is considered one of the best offensive guard prospects of his class.

Walters currently works as a Senior Analyst for Realized Holdings in Austin, Texas.

== High school career ==
Walters attended Frenship High School in Wolfforth, Texas, where he was a two-time all-state and three-time all-district offensive lineman and helped the team to a 48–9 record (17–1 in district play). He was named a 2008 High School All-American by USA Today and Parade.

Regarded as a five-star recruit by Rivals.com, Walters was listed as the No. 2 offensive tackle prospect of the class of 2009.

== College career ==
He appeared in one game at tackle in his first year at Texas, but than missed the remainder of the season with a foot injury and was granted a medical redshirt. In his redshirt freshman year, he started five games at right guard and appeared on special teams.
