= Kaylee Hartung =

American NBC News journalist (born 1985)

- Born: November 7, 1985 (age 40); Baton Rouge, Louisiana, U.S.
- Education: Washington and Lee University BA, Journalism (2007)
- Occupations: Sports broadcaster / journalist, news reporter
- Years active: 2008-present

Kaylee Hartung (born 1985) is an American broadcaster. Born in Baton Rouge, Louisiana, she has served as a contributor for CBS News, ESPN, CNN, ABC News, and NBC Sports. In July 2022, she was announced as the sideline reporter for Thursday Night Football on Amazon Prime Video.

== Early life ==
Hartung was born in Baton Rouge, Louisiana. Her father, Joe, served as a pilot in the Royal Netherlands Air Force, then moved to the United States and started an aviation company. He died in a plane crash in May 1996 while performing at an air show. Hartung, who witnessed the crash with her mother and brother, stated that the manner in which the crash was covered in the news inspired her to pursue a career in journalism to better tell others' stories.

Hartung graduated from Episcopal High School in 2003. She earned Bachelor of Arts degrees in journalism and politics from Washington and Lee University, graduating in 2007.

== Career ==
Hartung was a CBSNews.com reporter on the daily Washington Unplugged program and featured correspondent for Unplugged Under 40. Following a summer internship with NBC, she began her career as an assistant to Bob Schieffer, which led to an associate producer position on Face the Nation.

Hartung then worked at ESPN, serving in particular as a correspondent for Longhorn Network and SEC Network. In 2017, Hartung was hired by CNN. In 2019, Hartung left CNN and joined ABC News as a correspondent.

In July 2022, Amazon announced that Hartung would return to sports broadcasting as a sideline reporter for Thursday Night Football.

In January 2023, Hartung joined NBC News' The Today Show as a national correspondent. Hartung also joined NBC Sports' NFL Wild Card Weekend with Al Michaels and Tony Dungy. The next year, she joined NBC Sports' NFL playoff coverage permanently.
