= Craig Way =

American sportscaster (born 1960)

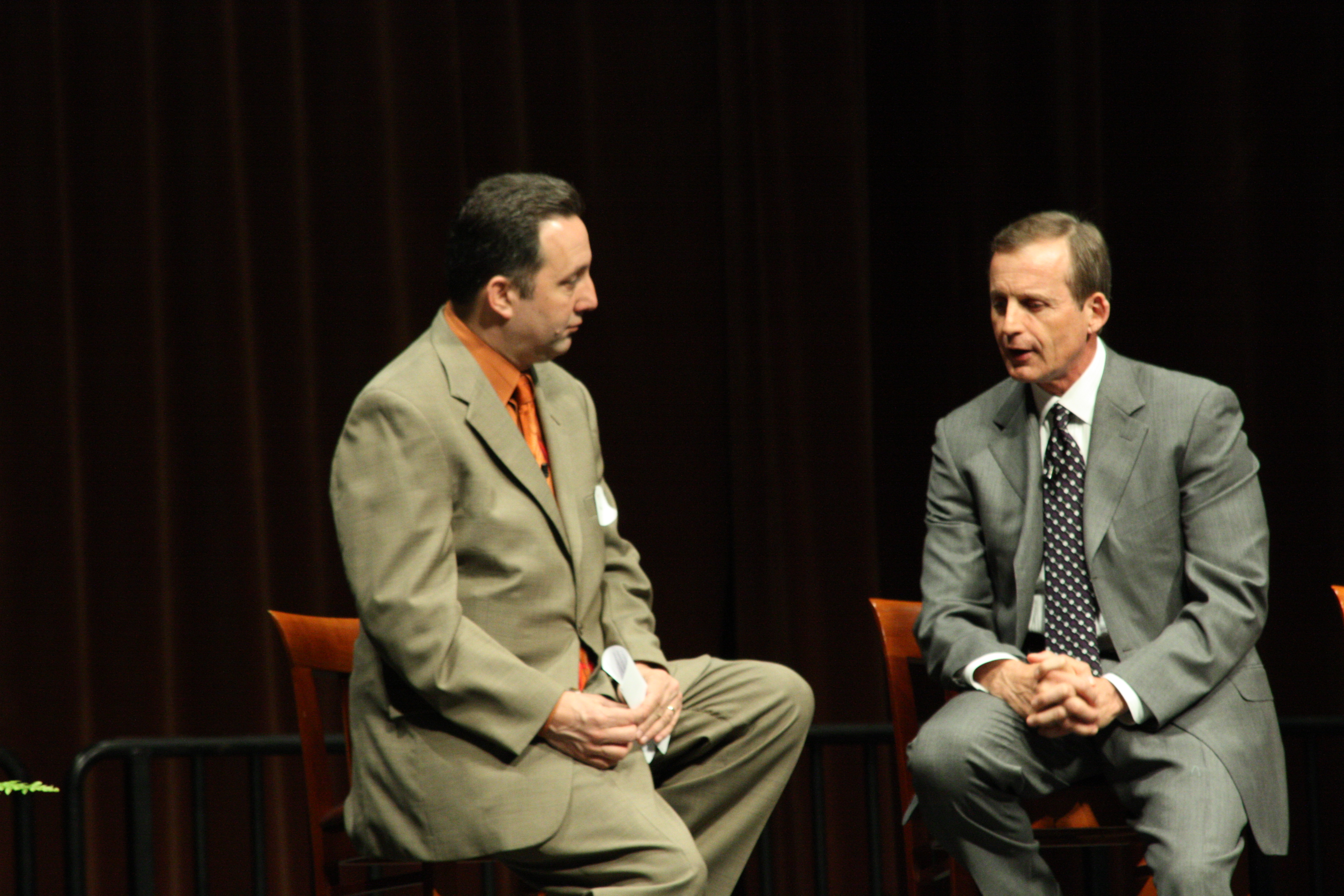
Craig Way (left) interviews Texas basketball coach Rick Barnes in 2009.

Craig Stephen Way (born 1960) is the current play-by-play announcer for the Texas Longhorns sports network. He does live radio play-by-play coverage for all major Texas Longhorn sports such as Longhorn football, men's and women's basketball and baseball. Additionally, he serves as a host on High School Scoreboard Live on Bally Sports Southwest.

As the voice of the Longhorns, Craig has had the opportunity to cover several large sporting events, including the 2006 Rose Bowl, in which Texas won college football's National Championship. He has also covered Texas in the 2003 Final Four along with two baseball National Championships for Texas in the College World Series in 2002 and 2005.
