= Roger Wallace =

American football player (born 1952)

No. 88
- Position: Wide receiver

Personal information
- Born: July 22, 1952 (age 74); Urbana, Ohio, U.S.
- Listed height: 5 ft 11 in (1.80 m)
- Listed weight: 180 lb (82 kg)

Career information
- High school: Urbana
- College: Bowling Green
- NFL draft: 1974: 12th round, 293rd overall pick

Career history
- Memphis Southmen (1974–1975); St. Louis Cardinals (1975)*; New York Giants (1976)
- * Offseason or practice squad member only
- Stats at Pro Football Reference

Roger Lee Wallace (born July 22, 1952) is an American former professional football player who was a wide receiver for the New York Giants of the National Football League (NFL). He played college football for the Bowling Green Falcons football and was selected in the 12th round of the 1974 NFL draft by the St. Louis Cardinals.

Played Memphis" Southmen" Grizzlies 1974/75-Wide Receiver/Punt Returner 1976 St. Louis Cardinals- 6 Exhibition Games and 1976 NY Giants as Wide Receiver/Punt Returner. He was released by the Giants after 1977 pre-season.
