= Jackson Jeffcoat =

American football player (born 1990)

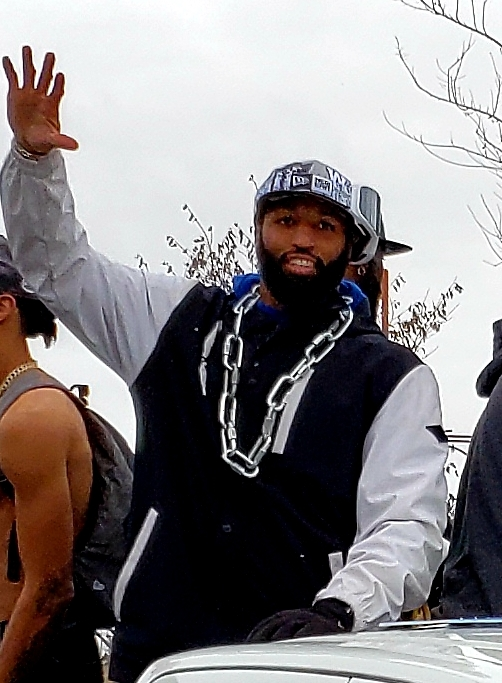
- Jeffcoat at the Blue Bombers 2019 Grey Cup parade

No. 94, 53
- Position: Defensive end

Personal information
- Born: December 26, 1990 (age 35); Dallas, Texas, U.S.
- Listed height: 6 ft 3 in (1.91 m)
- Listed weight: 253 lb (115 kg)

Career information
- High school: Plano West (Plano, Texas)
- College: Texas

Career history
- 2014: Seattle Seahawks*
- 2014–2015: Washington Redskins
- 2016: Cleveland Browns*
- 2017–2023: Winnipeg Blue Bombers
- * Offseason or practice squad member only

Awards and highlights
- 2× Grey Cup champion (2019, 2021); CFL All-Star (2021); CFL West All-Star (2021); Ted Hendricks Award (2013); Consensus All-American (2013); Big 12 Defensive Player of the Year (2013); First-team All-Big 12 (2013); Second-team All-Big 12 (2011)

Career CFL statistics
- Total tackles: 147
- Sacks: 38.0
- Forced fumbles: 13
- Interceptions: 2
- Stats at Pro Football Reference
- Stats at CFL.ca

Jackson Jeffcoat (born December 26, 1990) is an American former professional football player who was a defensive end for the Washington Redskins of the National Football League (NFL) and the Winnipeg Blue Bombers of the Canadian Football League (CFL). Jeffcoat won the 107th and 108th Grey Cup when the Blue Bombers defeated the Hamilton Tiger-Cats to conclude the 2019 and 2021 seasons. He played college football for the Texas Longhorns. Jeffcoat was signed by the Seattle Seahawks as an undrafted free agent in 2014.

== Early life ==
Born in Dallas, Texas, while his father, Jim Jeffcoat, played for the Dallas Cowboys, Jeffcoat attended Plano West Senior High School, where he was a two-time first-team all-state defensive end. Over his final three seasons, he recorded 259 tackles, 25.5 sacks, 56 TFL, 42 pressures, four PBU, three forced fumbles, two interceptions, two blocked kicks, and a touchdown. He was named a High School All-American by USA Today, Parade, and EA Sports. He was selected to play in the 2010 U.S. Army All-American Bowl.

Regarded as a five-star recruit by Rivals.com, Jeffcoat was listed as the No. 1 strong-side, defensive end in the class of 2010.

== College career ==
Jeffcoat attended the University of Texas at Austin from 2010 to 2013. Jeffcoat was named a 2010 Freshman All-American by The Sporting News. As a senior in 2013, he was a consensus All-American and won the Ted Hendricks Award in recognition of his contributions on the field.

== Professional career ==
Pre-draft measurables
| Height | Weight | Arm length | Hand span | 40-yard dash | Three-cone drill | Vertical jump | Broad jump | Bench press |
|---|---|---|---|---|---|---|---|---|
| 6 ft 3 in (1.91 m) | 247 lb (112 kg) | 33 7/8 in (0.86 m) | 9 5/8 in (0.24 m) | 4.63 s | 6.97 s | 36 in (0.91 m) | 10 ft 3 in (3.12 m) | 18 reps |
All values from NFL Combine.

=== Seattle Seahawks ===
Jeffcoat was originally predicted to be drafted somewhere in the middle rounds of the 2014 NFL draft. However, neither he nor any other member of the Longhorns team was selected that year, the first time since 1937 that no Longhorns were drafted. Jeffcoat signed with the Seattle Seahawks as an undrafted free agent. The Seahawks released him on August 25, 2014.

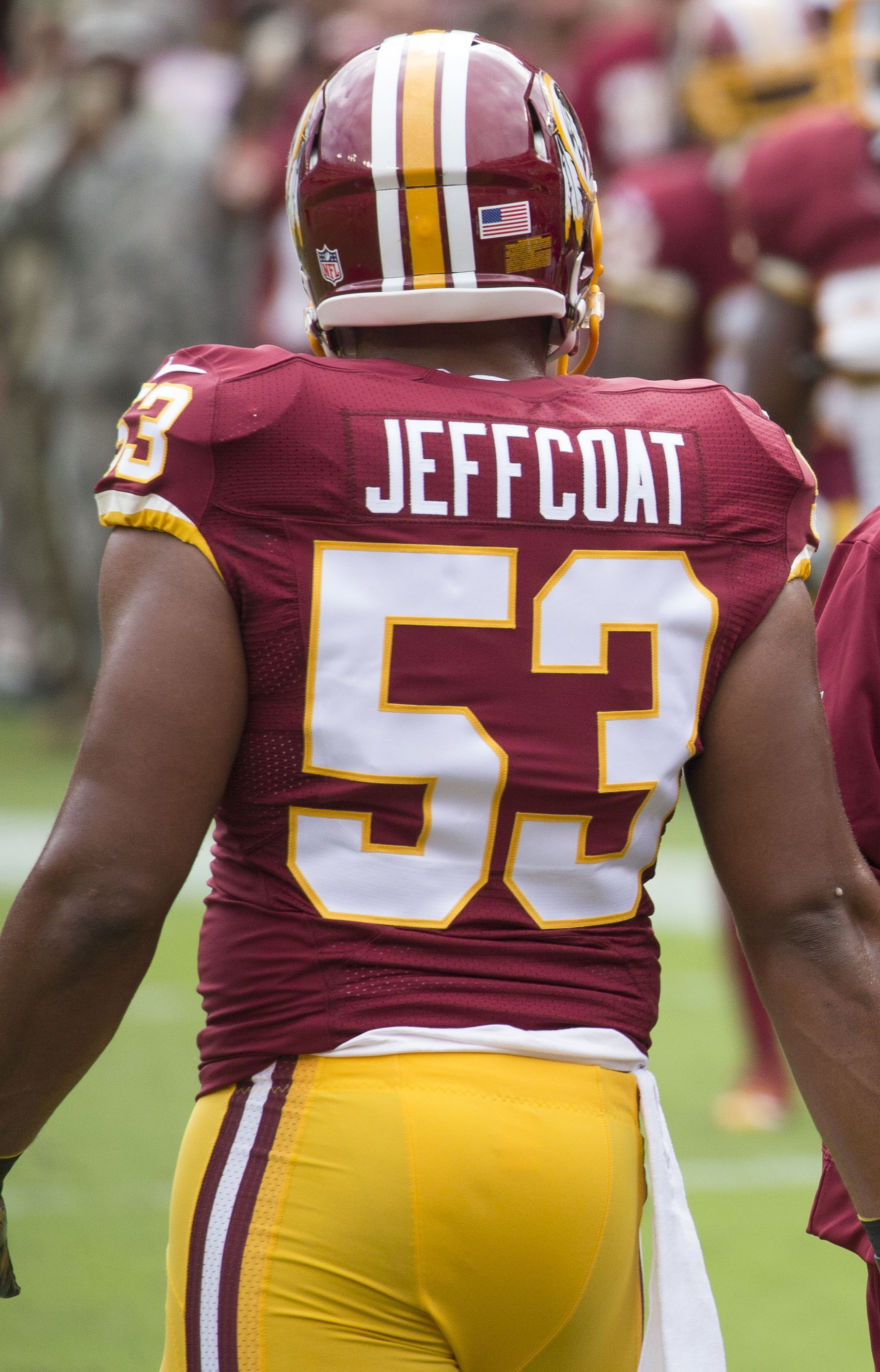
Jeffcoat with the Washington Redskins in 2015.

=== Washington Redskins ===
On September 2, 2014, Jeffcoat was signed to the practice squad of the Washington Redskins. He was promoted to the active roster on October 7, but was waived three days later. The Redskins re-signed him to their practice squad again on November 13. He was promoted again to the active roster on December 16. In the Week 16 win against the Philadelphia Eagles that removed them from playoff contention, Jeffcoat recorded his first career sack on quarterback Mark Sanchez. The following week, he had his first career start with Trent Murphy on injured reserve and recorded his first career interception, which came off Tony Romo, in the Week 17 loss to the Dallas Cowboys.

On November 7, 2015, he was placed on the team's injured reserve. He was waived by the team on April 14, 2016.

=== Cleveland Browns ===
Jeffcoat was claimed off waivers by the Cleveland Browns on April 15, 2016. On August 1, 2016, Jeffcoat was waived by the Browns.

=== Winnipeg Blue Bombers ===
Jeffcoat was signed by the Winnipeg Blue Bombers (CFL) on February 21, 2017. In 16 games played, Jeffcoat contributed 36 tackles, 7 sacks, 3 tackles on special teams, one interception, and a forced fumble. In Winnipeg's one postseason game, Jeffcoat had 5 tackles and a sack, but the Blue Bombers were defeated by Edmonton. 2018 saw Jeffcoat miss several games with injury, but he still put up a respectable 21 tackles, 5 sacks, and 2 forced fumbles. Jeffcoat also had a monster postseason, with four sacks in two games played, but a loss to Calgary in the Western Division final denied Jeffcoat and the Blue Bombers a trip to the 106th Grey Cup.

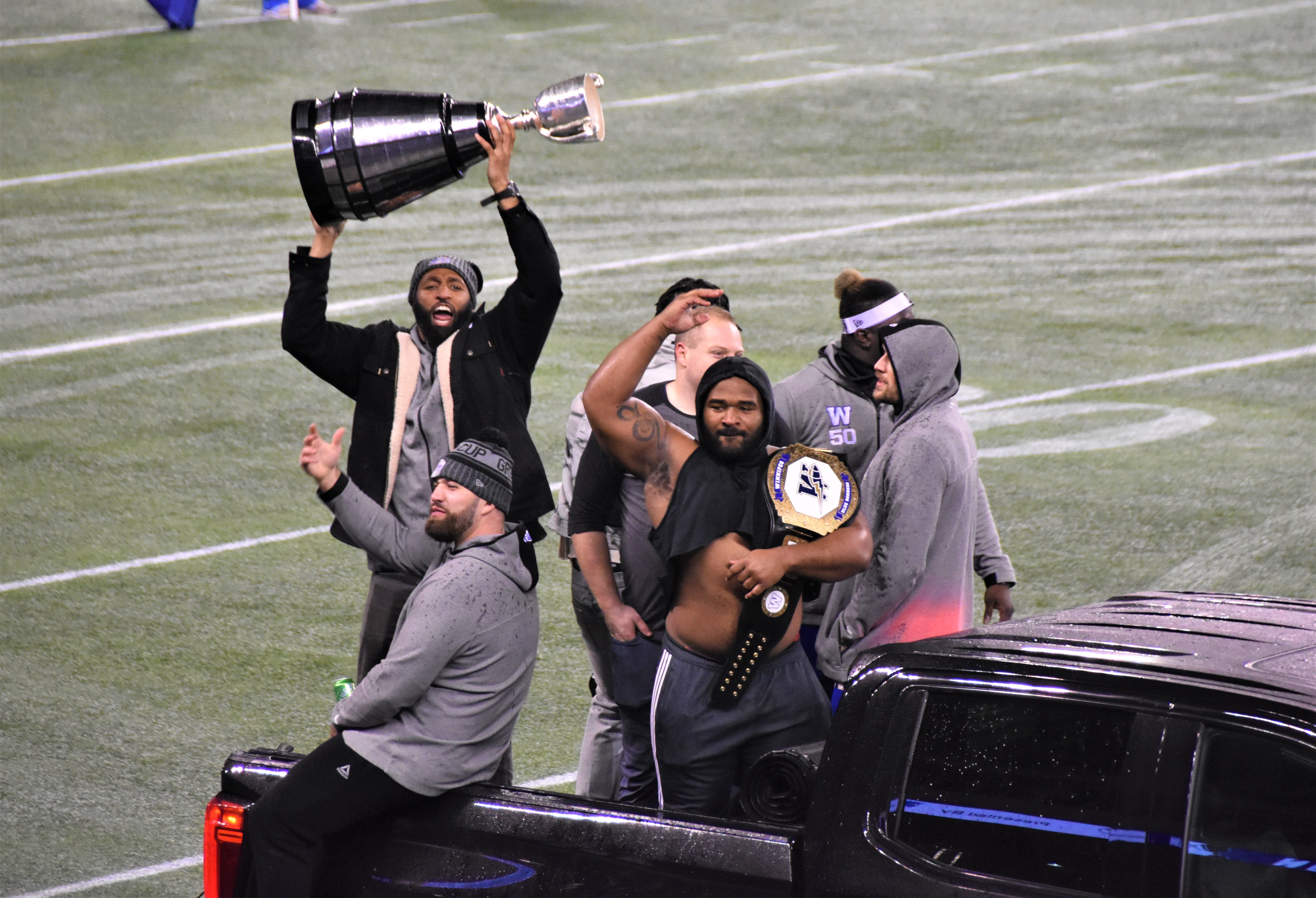
Jeffcoat raises the Grey Cup at Winnipeg's 2021 celebration at IG Field.

After fulfilling his CFL rookie contract, Jeffcoat was eligible to become a free agent on February 12, 2019. Jeffcoat was pursued by interested NFL teams, and was brought in for a workout by the Cincinnati Bengals. However, Jeffcoat was signed to a two-year contract extension with the Blue Bombers on January 21, 2019. Jeffcoat's 2019 season was almost identical to his 2018; he missed time with injury, played in the same number of games, had the same number of sacks and forced fumbles. In the 2019 Grey Cup, Jeffcoat had 4 tackles, 2 sacks and forced a fumble, which he recovered as the Blue Bombers went on to win 33–12.

Jeffcoat signed a one-year contract extension with the Blue Bombers on January 8, 2021. He played in 12 regular season games for the Bombers during the 2021 season and set a career high with nine quarterback sacks and four forced fumbles, to go along with 26 defensive tackles. Jeffcoat was named a CFL All-Star for the first time in his career, as he helped the Bombers win consecutive Grey Cups. Jeffcoat missed two games in the 2022 season with a hip injury.

On January 19, 2023, Jeffcoat and the Bombers agreed to a one-year contract extension. Jeffcoat suffered a lower-body injury in the Bombers' Week 1 win, the injury caused him to miss some action at the start of the season. However, Jeffcoat recovered and played in the most games in a single season since his rookie year, and produced his second highest numbers of sacks and forced fumbles on the year. After not hearing much from the Bombers prior to free agency, Jeffcoat retired on February 9.

== Statistics ==
=== CFL ===
| | | Defence |
| Year | Team | Games | Tackles | ST | Sacks | Int | TD | FF |
|---|---|---|---|---|---|---|---|---|
| 2017 | WPG | 16 | 36 | 3 | 7 | 1 | 0 | 1 |
| 2018 | WPG | 12 | 21 | 0 | 5 | 0 | 0 | 2 |
| 2019 | WPG | 12 | 23 | 0 | 5 | 0 | 0 | 2 |
| 2020 | WPG | Season cancelled |
| 2021 | WPG | 12 | 26 | 0 | 9 | 0 | 0 | 4 |
| 2022 | WPG | 12 | 20 | 0 | 4 | 1 | 0 | 1 |
| 2023 | WPG | 14 | 21 | 0 | 8 | 0 | 0 | 3 |
| CFL totals | | 78 | 147 | 3 | 38 | 2 | 0 | 13 |
