= Dave Campbell's Texas Football =

American gridiron football magazine

- The 2008 summer edition of Dave Campbell's Texas Football. On the cover are (from left) Michael Crabtree, Mike Leach, and Graham Harrell from Texas Tech.
- Editor: Greg Tepper
- President: Adam Hochfelder
- Categories: Sports
- Frequency: Biannual and premium online subscription content available at www.texasfootball.com
- Circulation: 100,000
- Founder: Dave Campbell
- Founded: 1960
- First issue: 1960
- Company: Sports In Action, LLC (formerly Highfield Marketing, LLC)
- Country: United States
- Based in: Lewisville, Texas
- Language: English
- Website: texasfootball.com
- ISSN: 0147-1287

Dave Campbell's Texas Football is a biannual magazine previewing American football teams in the state of Texas.

It previews football teams in Texas at all levels, from the NFL's Dallas Cowboys and Houston Texans, college football, to the roughly 1,400 high schools (public and private) in the state.

The summer magazine is issued in June, about 1–2 months before the start of preseason football. It sells for $11.95 and is available in most Texas stores which sell magazines. A winter edition, which began in 2008, is published each January. In 2015, the winter magazine became known as Texas Football Rising which focuses solely on recruiting and recruiting rankings.

== History ==
The magazine was started in 1960 by Dave Campbell, a longtime writer and sports editor for the Waco Tribune-Herald, along with fellow Waco sportswriters Hollis Biddle, Jim Montgomery, and Al Ward, plus Campbell's wife, Reba. He published the magazine out of his kitchen. On the cover of the inaugural edition was Texas Longhorns running back Jack Collins. The cover price for the first 96-page magazine was fifty cents.

It was bought in 1985 by Host Communications, which was bought by IMG in 2007. In 2014, Sports in Action, a company operated by the family of Texas businessman Drayton McLane and run by President Adam Hochfelder bought the rights to operate the magazine from IMG.

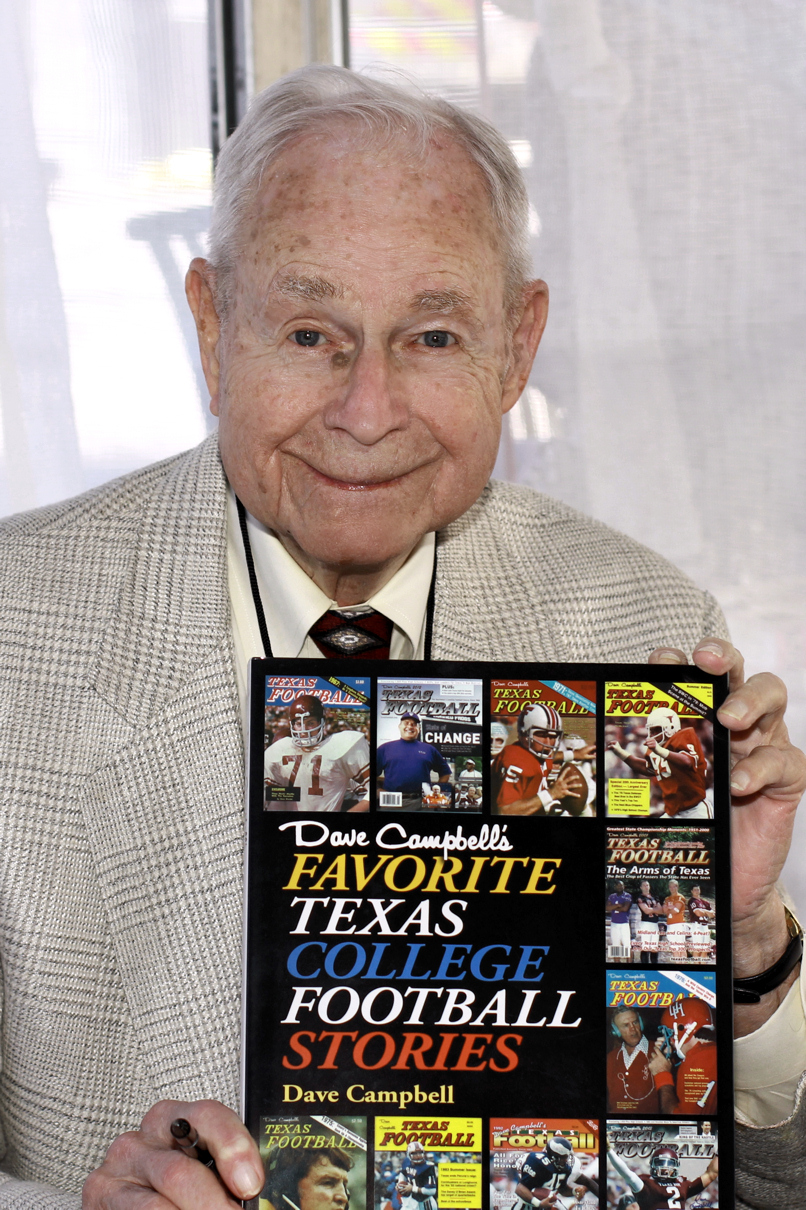
Campbell at the 2019 Texas Book Festival

It is one of the best-selling football magazines in the state and has been dubbed "The Bible of Texas Football". Each year, the identity of its cover subject(s) is a tightly-guarded secret. Campbell held the position of editor-in-chief until his death in 2021 at age 96.

Currently, Dave Campbell's Texas Football is a twice-yearly statewide magazine with more than 400,000 readers. In 2015, Sports In Action created a yearly sister magazine, Dave Campbell's Texas Basketball, with an accompanying web site.

The website, TexasFootball.com, was created in 1999. It added premium content covering recruiting and other topics, bundled with the annual subscription cost, in 2018.

In the summer of 2009, Texas Football launched a statewide weekly radio program — the Dave Campbell's Texas Football Radio Hour — which aired across Texas State Network affiliates. The radio show ended in 2016. In 2010, the magazine started its own television program, Texas Football Game Day, a half-hour show. Game Day was filmed weekly at the stadium of a key game and broadcast (sometimes live, sometime tape delayed) on Fox Sports Southwest. Due to its popularity, in 2011 DCTF partnered with Fox Sports Southwest to present Fox Football Friday Powered by Dave Campbell's Texas Football, a three-hour live show on Friday nights featuring whip-around coverage of the biggest games in Texas high school football. In October 2015, DCTF launched Texas Football Today, a daily live show covering football in Texas streamed on TexasFootball.com and its social media platforms.

Texas Football also ran its own high school football event, the Texas Football Classic, which was held at the beginning of each season at the Alamodome in San Antonio. The event ran from 1999-2010.

The Texas Football brand is run by President Adam Hochfelder, and editorial content — including the magazine, website, TV show and Texas Football Today — are run by managing editor Greg Tepper, assistant managing editor Ishmael Johnson, executive producer Ashley Pickle, web/social manager William Wilkerson, college insider Mike Craven and associate editor Mallory Hartley. Hochfelder has been in charge of the brand since 2005 and Tepper has been editor since 2011.

Dave Campbell died on December 10, 2021, after a short illness at the age of 96.

== Summer magazine covers ==
=== 1960s ===
- 1960: Jack Collins of Texas
- 1961: Ronnie Bull of Baylor (also pictured: Lance Alworth, Arkansas and James Saxton, Texas)
- 1962: Sonny Gibbs of TCU
- 1963: Coach Darrell Royal and Scott Appleton of Texas
- 1964: Lawrence Elkins and John Bridgers of Baylor
- 1965: Donny Anderson of Texas Tech
- 1966: John LaGrone of SMU (also pictured: Greg Pipes, Baylor and Diron Talbert, Texas)
- 1967: Maurice Moorman of Texas A&M
- 1968: Edd Hargett of Texas A&M
- 1969: James Street of Texas

=== 1970s ===
- 1970: Steve Worster of Texas
- 1971: Charles Napper of Texas Tech
- 1972: Brad Dusek of Texas A&M
- 1973: Glen Gaspard of Texas
- 1974: Coach Darrell Royal of Texas
- 1975: Coach Grant Teaff of Baylor
- 1976: Coach Bill Yeoman of Houston
- 1977: Rodney Allison of Texas Tech
- 1978: Russell Erxleben of Texas and Tony Franklin of Texas A&M
- 1979: Steve McMichael of Texas

=== 1980s ===
- 1980: Mike Singletary of Baylor and Mike Mosley of Texas A&M
- 1981: Craig James of SMU and Walter Abercrombie of Baylor
- 1982: Gary Kubiak of Texas A&M
- 1983: Lance McIlhenny of SMU
- 1984: Ray Childress of Texas A&M
- 1985: Coach Jim Wacker and Kenneth Davis of TCU
- 1986: Coach Jackie Sherrill of Texas A&M
- 1987: Coach David McWilliams and Bret Stafford of Texas
- 1988: Eric Metcalf of Texas and John Roper of Texas A&M
- 1989: Coach Jack Pardee of Houston and Coach Forrest Gregg of SMU

=== 1990s ===
- 1990: Coach Spike Dykes of Texas Tech
- 1991: David Klingler of Houston
- 1992: Trevor Cobb of Rice
- 1993: Coach R. C. Slocum of Texas A&M (also pictured: Jerrod Douglas of Converse Judson)
- 1994: Shea Morenz of Texas (also pictured: Tony Brackens of Texas)
- 1995: An illustrated collage featuring important figures in Southwest Conference history, including Earl Campbell, Bill Yeoman, Darrell Royal, Fred Akers, Sammy Baugh, Doak Walker, Mike Singletary, and Grant Teaff
- 1996: Coach Chuck Reedy of Baylor, Coach John Mackovic of Texas, Coach R. C. Slocum of Texas A&M and Coach Spike Dykes of Texas Tech
- 1997: James Brown and Ricky Williams of Texas (also pictured: Coach Kim Helton of Houston)
- 1998: Two covers: one with Coach Mack Brown and Ricky Williams of Texas, the other with Dat Nguyen of Texas A&M
- 1999: Coach Mack Brown of Texas, Coach Dennis Franchione of TCU
  - 1999 (alternative cover): Troy Aikman of the Dallas Cowboys, for sale outside the state of Texas

=== 2000s ===
- 2000: Cedric Benson of Midland Lee
- 2001: Casey Printers of TCU, Kliff Kingsbury of Texas Tech, Chris Simms of Texas and Mark Farris of Texas A&M McKenzie Tilmon of Irving MacArthur High
- 2002: Kliff Kingsbury of Texas Tech, Coach G.A. Moore of Celina High School, Emmitt Smith of the Dallas Cowboys, and Drew Tate of Baytown Lee
- 2003: Roy Williams of Texas
- 2004: Adell Duckett of Texas Tech, Patrick Cobbs of North Texas, Marvin Godbolt of TCU and Kevin Kolb of Houston
- 2005: Vince Young of Texas and Reggie McNeal of Texas A&M
- 2006: Earl Campbell of Texas, John Chiles of Mansfield Summit, Ryan Mallett of Texarkana Texas, Jarrett Lee of Brenham, and G. J. Kinne of Gilmer
- 2007: Tommy Blake of TCU, Colt McCoy of Texas, and Stephen McGee of Texas A&M
- 2008: Coach Mike Leach, Michael Crabtree, and Graham Harrell of Texas Tech
- 2009: Colt McCoy of Texas

=== 2010s ===
- 2010: Jerrod Johnson of Texas A&M, Case Keenum of Houston, and Andy Dalton of TCU
- 2011: Cyrus Gray of Texas A&M and Johnathan Gray of Aledo
- 2012: Coach Gary Patterson of TCU
- 2013: Johnny Manziel of Texas A&M
- 2014: Coach Art Briles, Bryce Petty, and Antwan Goodley of Baylor
- 2015: Illustration of the Texas vs. Texas A&M football rivalry by artist Roberto Parada
- 2016: Coach Kliff Kingsbury and Patrick Mahomes of Texas Tech
- 2017: Coach Tom Herman of Texas
- 2018: Coach Jimbo Fisher of Texas A&M (alternate cover: Ed Oliver of Houston)
- 2019: Sam Ehlinger of Texas

=== 2020s ===
- 2020: Shane Buechele of SMU
- 2021: Michael Clemons, Myles Jones, DeMarvin Leal and Demani Richardson of Texas A&M
- 2022: Coach Jeff Traylor of UTSA and Coach Joey McGuire of Texas Tech
- 2023: Coach Sonny Dykes of TCU
- 2024: Quinn Ewers of Texas and Conner Weigman of Texas A&M
- 2025: Coach Steve Sarkisian of Texas and Celina's Bowe Bentley, Luke Biagini and Coach Bill Elliott
- 2026: Coach Joey McGuire, athletic director Kirby Hocutt, board chair Cody Campbell, general manager James Blanchard, and Ben Roberts of Texas Tech (secondary cover; Richmond Randle's Landen Williams-Callis)

== Winter magazine covers ==
When the University of Texas won the BCS national title in the 2006 Rose Bowl, Texas Football put out a special championship edition of the magazine. Two years later, the magazine brought back the winter edition as a permanent feature. Beginning in 2016, the winter edition was replaced with Dave Campbell Presents Texas Football Rising, a magazine spotlighting top recruits in Texas.

- 2006: Vince Young of Texas
- 2008: Coach Mike Sherman of Texas A&M
- 2009: Quan Cosby of Texas, Michael Crabtree of Texas Tech, and Chase Clement of Rice
- 2010: Jordan Shipley of Texas and Jerry Hughes of TCU
- 2011: Coach Gary Patterson of TCU
- 2012: Robert Griffin III of Baylor
- 2013: Johnny Manziel of Texas A&M
- 2014: Bryce Petty of Baylor
- 2015: Trevone Boykin of TCU, Kyler Murray of Allen, and Tony Romo of the Dallas Cowboys

=== Texas Football Rising ===
- 2015: Jett Duffey of Lake Ridge (Texas Tech)
- 2016: Baron Browning of Kennedale (Ohio State)
- 2017: Keaontay Ingram of Carthage (Texas)
- 2018: Kenyon Green of Atascosita (Texas A&M)
- 2019: Haynes King of Longview (Texas A&M)
- 2020: Ja'Tavion Sanders of Denton Ryan (Texas)
- 2021: Denver Harris of Galena Park North Shore (Texas A&M)
- 2022: David Hicks Jr. of Katy Paetow (Texas A&M)
- 2023: Micah Hudson of Lake Belton (Texas Tech)
- 2024: Jonah Williams of Galveston Ball (Texas)

=== Mr. Texas Football ===
When Texas Football revived the winter book after the 2007 season, it began giving a "Mr. Texas Football Award" honoring the top high school player in the state. It is currently sponsored by Wells Fargo

- 2007: Jacquizz Rodgers, Rosenberg Lamar
- 2008: Garrett Gilbert, Lake Travis
- 2009: Darian "Stump" Godfrey, Gilmer
- 2010: Johnny Manziel, Kerrville Tivy
- 2011: Johnathan Gray, Aledo
- 2012: Dontre Wilson, DeSoto
- 2013: Kyler Murray, Allen
- 2014: Kyler Murray, Allen
- 2015: Jett Duffey, Mansfield Lake Ridge
- 2016: Roshauud Paul, Bremond
- 2017: Spencer Sanders, Denton Ryan
- 2018: Landry Gilpin, Veterans Memorial
- 2019: Marvin Mims, Lone Star
- 2020: Jonathon Brooks, Hallettsville
- 2021: Major Bowden, China Spring
- 2022: Terry Bussey, Timpson
- 2023: DJ Lagway, Willis
- 2024: Adam Schobel, Columbus
- 2025: Jermaine Bishop JR, Willis

== Dave Campbell's Texas Basketball ==
- 2015: Coaches Tubby Smith of Texas Tech and Shaka Smart of Texas
- 2016: Coaches Kim Mulkey and Scott Drew of Baylor
- 2017: Brooke McCarty and Coach Karen Aston of Texas, Kalani Brown and Coach Kim Mulkey of Baylor
- 2018: Coach Chris Beard of Texas Tech
- 2019: Lauren Cox of Baylor
- 2020: Davion Mitchell, Mark Vital, Jared Butler and MaCio Teague of Baylor
- 2021: Andrew Jones of Texas
- 2022: Marcus Sasser, Coach Kelvin Sampson and J'Wan Roberts of Houston
- 2023: Rori Harmon of Texas
