= 2009 Texas Longhorns football team =

American college football season

2009 Texas Longhorns football

Big 12 champion Big 12 South Division champion

Big 12 Championship Game, W 13–12 vs. Nebraska

BCS National Championship Game, L 21–37 vs. Alabama
- Conference: Big 12 Conference
- South

Ranking
- Coaches: No. 2
- AP: No. 2
- Record: 13–1 (8–0 Big 12)
- Head coach: Mack Brown (12th season)
- Offensive coordinator: Greg Davis (12th season)
- Offensive scheme: Spread
- Defensive coordinator: Will Muschamp (2nd season)
- Base defense: 4–3
- Home stadium: Darrell K Royal–Texas Memorial Stadium (Capacity: 100,119)

Uniform

2009 Big 12 Conference football standings
	Conf.			Overall
Team	W		L	W		L
North Division
No. 14 Nebraska x	6	–	2	10	–	4
Missouri	4	–	4	8	–	5
Kansas State	4	–	4	6	–	6
Iowa State	3	–	5	7	–	6
Colorado	2	–	6	3	–	9
Kansas	1	–	7	5	–	7
South Division
No. 2 Texas x$	8	–	0	13	–	1
Oklahoma State	6	–	2	9	–	4
No. 21 Texas Tech	5	–	3	9	–	4
Oklahoma	5	–	3	8	–	5
Texas A&M	3	–	5	6	–	7
Baylor	1	–	7	4	–	8
Championship: Texas 13, Nebraska 12
$ – BCS representative as conference champion; x – Division champion/co-champions; Rankings from AP Poll

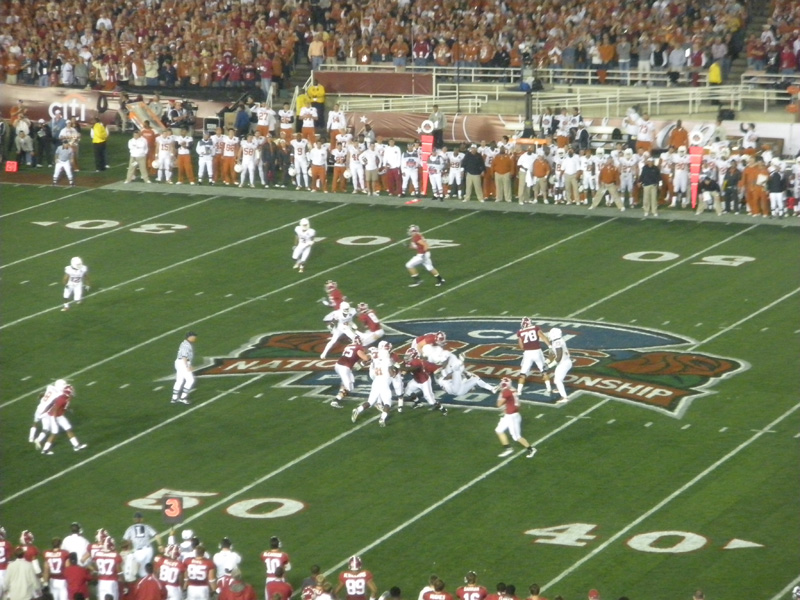
50-yard line action for the national championship in Pasadena CA, January 7, 2010

The 2009 Texas Longhorns football team (variously "Texas" or "UT" or the "Horns") represented the University of Texas at Austin in the 2009 NCAA Division I FBS football season. The team was coached by Mack Brown. Texas played their home games in Darrell K Royal–Texas Memorial Stadium.

The Longhorns finished the season 13–1, and 8–0 in Big 12 play. They represented the Big 12 South Division in the Big 12 Championship Game, where they defeated Nebraska, 13–12, to become Big 12 champions. The team finished the regular season ranked No. 2 in the Bowl Championship Series to earn a berth in the BCS National Championship Game where they were defeated by Alabama, 37–21. Texas finished the season ranked No. 2 in the AP and Coaches polls.

== Schedule ==
On February 25, 2008, UT and A&M announced that their annual game would move onto Thanksgiving Day for 2008 and 2009. The game was televised by ESPN. The same day, Texas announced that Arkansas dropped Texas from the 2009 schedule.

Date	Time	Opponent	Rank	Site	TV	Result	Attendance	Source
September 5	6:00 p.m.	Louisiana–Monroe*	No. 2	Darrell K Royal–Texas Memorial Stadium; Austin, TX	FSN PPV	W 59–20	101,096^{A}	
September 12	2:30 p.m.	at Wyoming*	No. 2	War Memorial Stadium; Laramie, WY	Versus	W 41–10	31,017	
September 19	7:00 p.m.	Texas Tech	No. 2	Darrell K Royal–Texas Memorial Stadium; Austin, TX (rivalry, College GameDay)	ABC	W 34–24	101,297	
September 26	2:30 p.m.	UTEP*	No. 2	Darrell K Royal–Texas Memorial Stadium; Austin, TX	FSN	W 64–7	101,114	
October 10	6:15 p.m.	Colorado	No. 2	Darrell K Royal–Texas Memorial Stadium; Austin, TX	ESPN	W 38–14	101,152	
October 17	11:00 a.m.	vs. No. 20 Oklahoma	No. 3	Cotton Bowl; Dallas, TX (Red River Rivalry, College GameDay)	ABC	W 16–13	96,009	
October 24	7:00 p.m.	at Missouri	No. 3	Faurot Field; Columbia, MO	ABC	W 41–7	71,004	
October 31	7:00 p.m.	at No. 13 Oklahoma State	No. 3	Boone Pickens Stadium; Stillwater, OK	ABC/ESPN2	W 41–14	58,516	
November 7	11:00 a.m.	UCF*	No. 2	Darrell K Royal–Texas Memorial Stadium; Austin, TX	FSN	W 35–3	101,003	
November 14	11:00 a.m.	at Baylor	No. 2	Floyd Casey Stadium; Waco, TX (rivalry)	FSN	W 47–14	44,372	
November 21	7:00 p.m.	Kansas	No. 3	Darrell K Royal–Texas Memorial Stadium; Austin, TX	ABC	W 51–20	101,357^{B}	
November 26	7:00 p.m.	at Texas A&M	No. 3	Kyle Field; College Station, TX (rivalry)	ESPN	W 49–39	84,671	
December 5	7:00 p.m.	vs. No. 21 Nebraska	No. 3	Cowboys Stadium; Arlington, TX (Big 12 Championship Game)	ABC	W 13–12	76,211	
January 7, 2010	7:30 p.m.	vs. No. 1 Alabama*	No. 2	Rose Bowl; Pasadena, CA (BCS Championship Game, College GameDay)	ABC	L 21–37	94,906	
*Non-conference game; Rankings from AP Poll released prior to the game; All times are in Central time

- ^A Denotes the largest crowd to watch a football game in the state of Texas, at a Big 12 Conference Stadium, or in the Southwest region (beating record set at DKR during the 2008 Texas Longhorns season).
- ^B Denotes the largest crowd to watch a football game at DKR set earlier in 2009. The largest crowd to watch a game in the state of Texas and Southwest region records were broken on September 20 when the Dallas Cowboys played in front of 105,121 at Cowboys Stadium.

== Game summaries ==
=== Louisiana–Monroe ===
	1	2	3	4	Total
ULM	3	7	0	10	20
#2 Texas	14	24	7	14	59

In the season opener, Texas routed ULM 59–20 as quarterback Colt McCoy passed for over 300 yards and two touchdowns and his roommate, number 1 receiver Jordan Shipley, had 180 yards receiving.

=== Wyoming ===
	1	2	3	4	Total
#2 Texas	3	10	21	7	41
Wyoming	0	10	0	0	10

In the first half, Texas got off to a slow start, with Wyoming leading 10–6 at one point, but rallied to blow out Wyoming in the second half, with QB Colt McCoy passing for 300 yards and three touchdowns.

=== Texas Tech ===
	1	2	3	4	Total
Texas Tech	3	0	14	7	24
#2 Texas	7	3	14	10	34

The series with the Texas Tech Red Raiders began in 1928, and entering the game, the Longhorns' record was 43–15–0.

Texas was in for revenge after the previous season's last-second Michael Crabtree miracle breakaway for a touchdown in a 39–33 loss to Tech which eliminated Texas from the championship race. Texas scored the first touchdown on a Jordan Shipley punt return that got the mascot in his feet to give Texas a 7–3 lead, which thereafter they did not let up and got their revenge in a 34–24 victory over Texas Tech.

=== UTEP ===
	1	2	3	4	Total
UTEP	7	0	0	0	7
#2 Texas	23	24	10	7	64

The 2008 game was the first meeting between the Longhorns and the UTEP Miners. Texas won 42–13. The 2009 game was the first occasion for the Miners to visit Austin. Texas led 47–7 at halftime and routed the Miners.

=== Colorado ===
	1	2	3	4	Total
Colorado	7	7	0	0	14
#2 Texas	3	7	14	14	38

Texas struggled early against Colorado, trailing 14–3 at one point. However a series of non-offensive touchdowns led the Longhorns to a 38–14 victory. The sloppiness of this game however caused the Longhorns to drop from number 2 to number 3 in the AP Poll.

=== Oklahoma ===
#20 Oklahoma vs. #3 Texas

Team	1	2	3	4	Total
Oklahoma	6	0	7	0	13
• Texas	0	3	10	3	16

- Date: October 17
- Location: Cotton Bowl, Dallas
- Game start: 11:09 a.m. CST
- Elapsed time: 3:42
- Game attendance: 96,009
- Referee: Scott Novak
- TV announcers (ABC): Brent Musburger (Play-by-play), Kirk Herbstreit (Color), & Lisa Salters (Sideline)

Scoring summary
1	13:04	OU	Jimmy Stevens 26-yard field goal	OU 3-0
1	6:50	OU	Jimmy Stevens 37-yard field goal	OU 6-0
2	3:42	TEX	Hunter Lawrence 42-yard field goal	OU 6-3
3	12:29	TEX	Hunter Lawrence 42-yard field goal	Tied 6-6
3	7:08	TEX	Marquise Goodwin 14-yard pass from Colt McCoy (Hunter Lawrence kick)	TEX 13-6
3	4:39	OU	Ryan Broyles 35-yard pass from Landry Jones (Jimmy Stevens kick)	Tied 13-13
4	12:08	TEX	Hunter Lawrence 32-yard field goal	TEX 16-13

The rivalry with Oklahoma has been called one of the greatest sports rivalries. Since 1929 the game has been held at the Cotton Bowl in Dallas, typically in mid-October with the State Fair of Texas occurring adjacent to the stadium.

Texas started off slowly, trailing 6–0. OU QB Sam Bradford was injured and out for the season due to a result of a hit by CB Aaron Williams early in the game. The game was a defensive struggle, but a leaping interception by Aaron Williams of Landry Jones in the red zone put Texas in position to put the game away. However, Colt McCoy threw an interception a few plays later, but made a touchdown-saving tackle on the return. A few plays later, safety Earl Thomas intercepted Landry Jones to seal the game for the Longhorns.

=== Missouri ===
	1	2	3	4	Total
#3 Texas	21	14	3	3	41
Missouri	0	7	0	0	7

Texas jumped out to a 21–0 lead on Missouri in a sold-out stadium. The Horns dominated the game, winning 41–7 with three touchdowns from Colt McCoy.

=== Oklahoma State ===
	1	2	3	4	Total
#3 Texas	3	21	17	0	41
#13 Oklahoma State	0	7	0	7	14

In what was supposed to be a match-up between the Big 12's two best teams on Halloween night in Stillwater, Oklahoma, Texas dominated. The Horns intercepted OSU QB Zac Robinson 4 times, returning two for TDs.

=== UCF ===
	1	2	3	4	Total
UCF	0	3	0	0	3
#2 Texas	0	14	7	14	35

The Longhorns came out flat against the Knights but Colt McCoy passed for 470 yards and Jordan Shipley set the school receiving record with 273 yards, as the running game amassed less than 50 yards on the ground.

=== Baylor ===
	1	2	3	4	Total
#2 Texas	14	26	0	7	47
Baylor	0	0	0	14	14

The Longhorns first played the Baylor Bears in 1901 and faced them annually during the days of the Southwest Conference. In the 98 meetings through 2008, Texas' record with the Bears was 72 wins, 22 losses, and 4 ties. This is Texas' third-longest rivalry by number of games: only Oklahoma and Texas A&M have faced Texas more often on the football field.

On Baylor's first drive, they moved the ball into the red zone, but CB Aaron Williams intercepted a pass in the endzone and the game would be dominated by the Horns from there. Texas jumped out to a 40–0 halftime lead, and lead 47–0 at one point. Baylor was able to score two late td's however.

=== Kansas ===
	1	2	3	4	Total
Kansas	0	6	7	7	20
#3 Texas	7	20	7	17	51

In Colt McCoy's last home game, the Horns routed the reeling Kansas Jayhawks, riding a five-game losing streak. Colt McCoy passed for 396 yards and 4 TDs, and in victory became the winningest QB in college football history.

=== Texas A&M ===
	1	2	3	4	Total
#3 Texas	7	21	7	14	49
Texas A&M	7	14	3	15	39

This game marked the 116th meeting between Texas and the Texas A&M Aggies and it was the fifth year as part of a multi-sport rivalry called the Lone Star Showdown. The football rivalry began in 1894 and it is the longest-running rivalry for both the Longhorns and the Aggies and it is also the third most-played rivalry in Division I-A college football. Texas entered the 2009 contest with a 74–36–5 record against Texas A&M. Since the series began in 1900, the game has traditionally been played on Thanksgiving Day or Thanksgiving weekend.

=== Big 12 Championship Game – Nebraska ===
	1	2	3	4	Total
#3 Texas	0	7	3	3	13
#21 Nebraska	6	0	0	6	12

=== BCS National Championship – Alabama ===
	1	2	3	4	Total
#2 Texas	6	0	7	8	21
#1 Alabama	0	24	0	13	37

On game day, Texas wore its white jerseys and was situated on the east sideline, and Alabama wore its crimson jerseys and used the west bench at the Rose Bowl stadium.

Alabama made their first appearance in the BCS National Championship Game. The last time Texas played at the Rose Bowl, Texas won the BCS National Championship in the 2006 Rose Bowl by defeating USC 41–38 with Vince Young scoring an 8-yard run touchdown with 19 seconds left in the game. The previous year, Texas won the Rose Bowl game 38–37 over Michigan when Dusty Mangum kicked a field goal as time expired.

This game did not result in a victory like all the others had that season. Texas QB Colt McCoy went down early and was replaced by true freshman Garrett Gilbert, who threw four interceptions.

Texas has played in the Rose Bowl once during the regular season, losing to UCLA 49–31 during the 1998 season.

== Rankings ==
Ranking movements Legend: ██ Increase in ranking ██ Decrease in ranking ( ) = First-place votes
	Week															
Poll	Pre	1	2	3	4	5	6	7	8	9	10	11	12	13	14	Final
AP	2 (2)	2 (2)	2 (1)	2 (2)	2 (1)	2 (1)	3	3	3 (7)	2 (13)	2 (10)	3 (10)	3 (11)	3 (7)	2 (2)	2
Coaches	2 (4)	2 (2)	2	2	2 (1)	2 (1)	2 (1)	3 (1)	3 (4)	2 (4)	2 (4)	2 (4)	2 (4)	2 (3)	2 (4)	2
Harris	Not released				2 (4)	2 (12)	2 (2)	3 (4)	3 (20)	2 (19)	2 (18)	2 (19)	2 (18)	2 (15)	2 (6)	Not released
BCS	Not released							3	3	2	3	3	3	3	2	Not released

== Statistics ==
=== Team ===
	Team	Opp
Scoring		
Points per game		
First downs		
Rushing		
Passing		
Penalty		
Total offense		
Avg per play		
Avg per game		
Fumbles-Lost		
Penalties-Yards		
Avg per game		

	Team	Opp
Punts-Yards		
Avg per punt		
Time of possession/Game		
3rd down conversions		
4th down conversions		
Touchdowns scored		
Field goals-Attempts-Long		
PAT-Attempts		
Attendance		
Games/Avg per Game		

==== Scores by quarter ====
	1	2	3	4	Total
Texas	108	194	127	121	550
Opponents	39	85	31	79	234

=== Offense ===
==== Rushing ====
Player	Games	Attempts	Yards	Average	TD
Colt McCoy	14	129	348	2.7	3
Tre' Newton	14	116	552	4.8	6
Cody Johnson	14	87	335	3.9	12
Vondrell McGee	11	56	300	5.4	2
Fozzy Whittaker	11	53	212	4.0	4
D.J. Monroe	11	23	143	6.2	0
Garrett Gilbert	10	11	5	0.5	1
Jeremy Hills	10	9	86	9.6	0
Jamison Berryhill	9	9	34	3.8	0
John Chiles	12	8	37	4.6	0
Justin Tucker	14	2	9	4.5	0
Marquise Goodwin	14	2	8	4.0	0
Sherrod Harris	2	1	4	4.0	0
Antwan Cobb	14	1	3	3.0	0
Jordan Shipley	14	1	0	0.0	0

Provided by CFB at Sports Reference: View Original Table Generated 11/17/2022.

==== Passing ====
Player	Games	Completions	Attempts	Percentage	Yards	Yards/Attempt	TD	Interceptions
Colt McCoy	14	332	470	70.6	3521	7.5	27	12
Garrett Gilbert	10	30	66	45.5	310	4.7	2	4

Provided by CFB at Sports Reference: View Original Table Generated 11/17/2022

Receiving

Player	Games	Receptions	Yards	Average	Touchdowns
Jordan Shipley	14	116	1485	12.8	13
James Kirkendoll	14	48	461	9.6	6
Dan Buckner	14	45	442	9.8	4
Malcolm Williams (American football)	14	39	550	14.1	2
John Chiles	12	34	319	9.4	3
Marquise Goodwin	14	30	279	9.3	1
Tre' Newton	14	14	108	7.7	0
Fozzy Whittaker	11	13	51	3.9	0
Vondrell McGee	11	8	37	4.6	0
Cody Johnson	14	7	42	6.0	0
Greg Smith	14	6	48	8.0	0
Philip Payne	6	1	7	7.0	0
Desean Hales	8	1	2	2.0	0

Provided by CFB at Sports Reference: View Original Table Generated 11/17/2022.

=== Defense ===
Player	Games	Solo Tackles	Assisted Tackles	Total Tackles	Tackles for Loss	Sacks	Interceptions	Int. Return Yards	Passes Defenced	Fumble Recovery	Fumb. Recovery Yards	Forced Fumbles	Defensive Touchdowns
Roddrick Muckelroy	13	59	26	85	9.0	2.0	1	4					
Earl Thomas	14	46	19	65	4.5	0.0	8	149					2
Keenan Robinson	14	42	21	63	4.0	1.5			1				
Lamarr Houston	14	40	20	60	17.0	7.0			4				
Sam Acho	14	42	17	59	13.0	9.0			3			2	
Sergio Kindle	14	40	18	58	15.0	6.0			2			2	
Blake Gideon	14	34	15	49	2.0	0.0	6	31					
Curtis Brown (cornerback)	14	34	13	47	1.5	0.0	1	77					1
Chykie Brown	14	30	15	45	4.5	2.0	2	15					
Emmanuel Acho	14	36	9	45	9.5	2.0	1	13					
Aaron Williams (American football)	13	26	10	36	5.5	2.0	3	0					
Ben Alexander	14	19	10	29	5.0	0.0							
Dustin Earnest	13	16	8	24	1.0	1.0							
Nolan Brewster	14	14	7	21	1.5	0.0	1	0					
Kheeston Randall	14	10	11	21	4.5	3.0							
Eddie Jones (linebacker)	14	15	4	19	5.5	3.5	1	60					1
Kenny Vaccaro	12	13	5	18	0.0	0.0						1	
Alex Okafor	14	9	9	18	1.5	0.0							
Clark Ford	11	11	6	17	0.0	0.0							
Deon Beasley	12	15	0	15	2.0	1.0						2	
Antwan Cobb	14	10	3	13	0.0	0.0							
Aaron Smith	14	9	2	11	0.0	0.0							
Ben Wells (gridiron football)	12	9	1	10	1.0	1.0	1	0					
Marcus Davis (American football)	6	6	3	9	1.0	1.0							
Malcolm Williams (American football)	14	6	2	8	1.0	0.0							
Ryan Roberson	13	2	4	6	0.0	0.0							
Justin Tucker	14	5	1	6	0.0	0.0							
Jared Norton	5	4	1	5	0.0	0.0							
Russell Carter	7	2	2	4	0.0	0.0							
Calvin Howell	4	1	2	3	1.0	1.0							
Tevin Mims	5	0	3	3	0.5	0.0							
Greg Smith	14	3	0	3	0.0	0.0							
Jeremy Hills	10	2	0	2	0.0	0.0							
Colt McCoy	14	1	1	2	0.0	0.0							
Fozzy Whittaker	11	1	1	2	0.0	0.0							
Barrett Matthews	13	0	1	1	0.0	0.0							
Mark Fisher	4	0	1	1	0.0	0.0							
Trey Graham	1	1	0	1	0.0	0.0							
William Harvey	14	1	0	1	0.0	0.0							
Tyrell Higgins	7	1	0	1	1.0	1.0							
Cody Hill	4	0	1	1	0.0	0.0							
Michael Huey (American football)	13	1	0	1	0.0	0.0							
Trevor Walker	2	1	0	1	0.0	0.0							
Jamison Berryhill	9	1	0	1	0.0	0.0							
Dan Buckner	14	1	0	1	0.0	0.0							
John Chiles	12	1	0	1	0.0	0.0							
James Kirkendoll	14	1	0	1	0.0	0.0							
Hunter Lawrence	14	1	0	1	0.0	0.0							
Vondrell McGee	11	1	0	1	0.0	0.0							
Jordan Shipley	14	1	0	1	0.0	0.0							

Provided by CFB at Sports Reference: View Original Table Generated 11/17/2022.

=== Special teams ===
Player	Games	Extra Point Makes	Extra Point Attempts	XP%	Field Goal Makes	Field Goal Attempts	FG%	Punts	Punt Yards	Yards Per Punt
Hunter Lawrence	14	61	62	98.4	24	27	88.9			
Ryan Bailey	3	5	5	100.0						
Justin Tucker	14							43	1737	40.4
John Gold	8							15	662	44.1
Colt McCoy	14							4	131	32.8

Provided by CFB at Sports Reference: View Original Table Generated 11/17/2022.

Player	Games	Kick Returns	Kick Return Yards	Yards Per K. Return	Punt Returns	Punt Return Yards	Yards Per P. Return	Return Touchdowns
D.J. Monroe	11	16	537	33.6				2
Marquise Goodwin	14	16	349	21.8	1	22	22.0	1
Malcolm Williams (American football)	14	4	106	26.5				1
Jordan Shipley	14	4	74	18.5	24	311	13.0	2
Antwan Cobb	14	2	26	13.0				
Aaron Williams (American football)	13	1	27	27.0				
Earl Thomas	14				3	54	18.0	
Curtis Brown (cornerback)	14				1	5	5.0	
Ben Wells (gridiron football)	12					3		

Provided by CFB at Sports Reference: View Original Table Generated 11/17/2022.
