= Mr. Football =

Mr. Football may refer to:

- Mr. Football Award (disambiguation), any of various American high school football awards

== People ==
- Jack Sheedy (Australian rules footballer) (1926–2023)
- Ted Whitten (1933–95)
