= Mr. Football Award =

Mr. Football Award may refer to:

- Mr. Football Award (Alabama)
- Mr. Football Award (Florida)
- Mr. Football Award (Indiana)
- Mr. Football Award (Kentucky)
- Mr. Football Award (Louisiana)
- Mr. Football Award (Michigan)
- Mr. Football Award (Minnesota)
- Mr. Football Award (Ohio)
- Mr. Pennsylvania Football
- Mr. Football Award (South Carolina)
- Mr. Football Award (Texas)
- Mr. Football USA
- Mr. Football, one of the PSA Annual Awards, presented by the Philippine Sportswriters Association
