= Mr. Texas Football =

Dave Campbell's Texas Football magazine award

The Mr. Texas Football award is an honor given to the top high school football player in the state of Texas, United States. It is awarded by Dave Campbell's Texas Football magazine. The award was established in 2007.

== Award winners ==
Year	Player	Position	High school	Classification	College	Professional team(s)
2007	Jacquizz Rodgers	RB	Lamar Consolidated	4A	Oregon State	Atlanta Falcons, Chicago Bears, Tampa Bay Buccaneers
2008	Garrett Gilbert	QB	Lake Travis	4A	Texas / SMU	St. Louis Rams, New England Patriots, Detroit Lions, Oakland Raiders, Carolina Panthers, Orlando Apollos, Cleveland Browns, Dallas Cowboys, Washington Football Team
2009	Darian "Stump" Godfrey	QB	Gilmer	3A	New Mexico / Hawaii / Navarro	
2010	Johnny Manziel	QB	Kerrville Tivy	4A	Texas A&M	Cleveland Browns, Hamilton Tiger-Cats, Montreal Alouettes, Memphis Express, Zappers
2011	Johnathan Gray	RB	Aledo	4A	Texas	
2012	Dontre Wilson	RB	DeSoto	5A	Ohio State	BC Lions
2013	Kyler Murray	QB	Allen	6A	Texas A&M / Oklahoma	Arizona Cardinals
2014	Kyler Murray	QB	Allen	6A	Texas A&M / Oklahoma	Arizona Cardinals
2015	Jett Duffey	QB	Mansfield Lake Ridge	5A	Texas Tech / Hampton	
2016	Roshauud Paul	QB	Bremond	2A	Texas A&M / Arkansas State	
2017	Spencer Sanders	QB	Denton Ryan	5A	Oklahoma State / Ole Miss	
2018	Landry Gilpin	QB	Mission Veterans Memorial	5A	Southwestern	
2019	Marvin Mims	WR	Frisco Lone Star	5A	Oklahoma	Denver Broncos
2020	Jonathon Brooks	RB	Hallettsville	3A	Texas	Carolina Panthers
2021	Major Bowden	QB	China Spring	4A	Lamar	
2022	Terry Bussey	QB / DB	Timpson	2A	Texas A&M	
2023	DJ Lagway	QB	Willis	6A	Florida / Baylor	
2024	Adam Schobel	QB	Columbus	3A	TCU	
2025	Jermaine Bishop Jr.	WR / CB	Willis	6A	Texas	
