= Mr. Football USA =

- Awarded for: High school football's top athlete
- Country: United States
- Presented by: ESPN HS
- First award: 1970
- Currently held by: Will Grier

Mr. Football USA also known as ESPN RISE National Player of the Year, formerly EA Sports Mr. Football USA, is an award presented to the United States high school football National Player of the year by ESPN HS. In 2013, the award was given by the StudentSports.com.

== Awardees ==
- 2013 – Will Grier, Davidson (North Carolina) QB
- 2012 – Max Browne, Skyline (Washington) QB
- 2011 – Johnathan Gray, Aledo (Texas) RB
- 2010 – Johnathan Gray, Aledo (Texas) RB (Jr.)
- 2009 – Dillon Baxter, Mission Bay (San Diego) QB-RB
- 2008 – Garrett Gilbert, Lake Travis (Austin, Texas) QB
- 2007 – Jacory Harris, Northwestern (Miami) QB
- 2006 – Darren Evans, Warren Central (Indianapolis) FB
- 2005 – Matthew Stafford, Highland Park (Dallas) QB
- 2004 – Chase Daniel, Carroll (Southlake, Texas) QB
- 2003 – Jeff Byers, Loveland (Loveland, Colo.) OL-DL
- 2002 – Chris Leak, Independence (Charlotte, N.C.) QB
- 2001 – Vince Young, Madison (Houston) QB
- 2000 – Cedric Benson, Robert E. Lee (Midland, Texas) RB
- 1999 – D. J. Williams, De La Salle (Concord, Calif.) RB-LB
- 1998 – J. R. House, Nitro (Nitro, W. Va.) QB
- 1997 – Ronald Curry, Hampton (Va.) QB-RB
- 1996 – Travis Henry, Frostproof (Fla.) RB
- 1995 – Tim Couch, Leslie County (Hyden, Ky.) QB
- 1994 – Chris Redman, Male (Louisville, Ky.) QB
- 1993 – Peyton Manning, Newman (New Orleans) QB
- 1992 – James Allen, Wynnewood (Okla.) RB
- 1991 – Steven Davis, Spartanburg (S.C.) RB
- 1990 – Derrick Brooks, Washington (Pensacola, Fla.) LB
- 1989 – Robert Smith, Euclid (Ohio) RB
- 1988 – Terry Kirby, Tabb (Va.) RB
- 1987 – Carl Pickens, Murphy (N.C.) WR
- 1986 – Emmitt Smith, Escambia (Pensacola, Fla.) RB
- 1985 – Jeff George, Warren Central (Indianapolis) QB
- 1984 – Andre Rison, Northwestern (Flint, Mich.) WR-DB
- 1983 – Chris Spielman, Washington (Massillon, Ohio) LB
- 1982 – Rod Woodson, Snider (Fort Wayne, Ind.) WR-DB
- 1981 – Marcus Dupree, Philadelphia (Miss.) RB
- 1980 – Bill Fralic, Penn Hills (Pittsburgh) OL
- 1979 – Herschel Walker, Johnson County (Wrightsville, Ga.) RB
- 1978 – Eric Dickerson, Sealy (Sealy) RB
- 1977 – Marcus Allen, Lincoln (San Diego) QB-RB
- 1976 – Freeman McNeil, Banning (Wilmington, Calif.) RB
- 1975 – Charles White, San Fernando (San Fernando, Calif.) RB
- 1974 – Billy Sims, Hooks (Hooks, Texas) RB
- 1973 – Earl Campbell, John Tyler (Tyler, Texas) RB
- 1972 – Tony Dorsett, Hopewell (Aliquippa, Pa.) RB
- 1971 – Dave Logan, Wheat Ridge (Wheat Ridge, Colo.) WR
- 1970 – Pat Haden, Bishop Amat (La Puente, Calif.) QB
