= Timpson Independent School District =

School district in Texas

Timpson Independent School District is a public school district based in Timpson, Texas (USA). In 2009, the school district was rated "academically acceptable" by the Texas Education Agency.

The district changed to a four-day school week in fall 2022.

According to the Texas Tribune, during the 2021–2022 school year approximately 643 students attended, with an overall graduation rate of 97.8%; ten percent above the Texas state average.

== Schools ==
Timpson ISD has three campuses -

- Timpson High School (Grades 9–12)
- Timpson Middle School (Grades 6–8)
- Timpson Elementary School (Grades PK-5)
