= Timpson, Texas =

- City
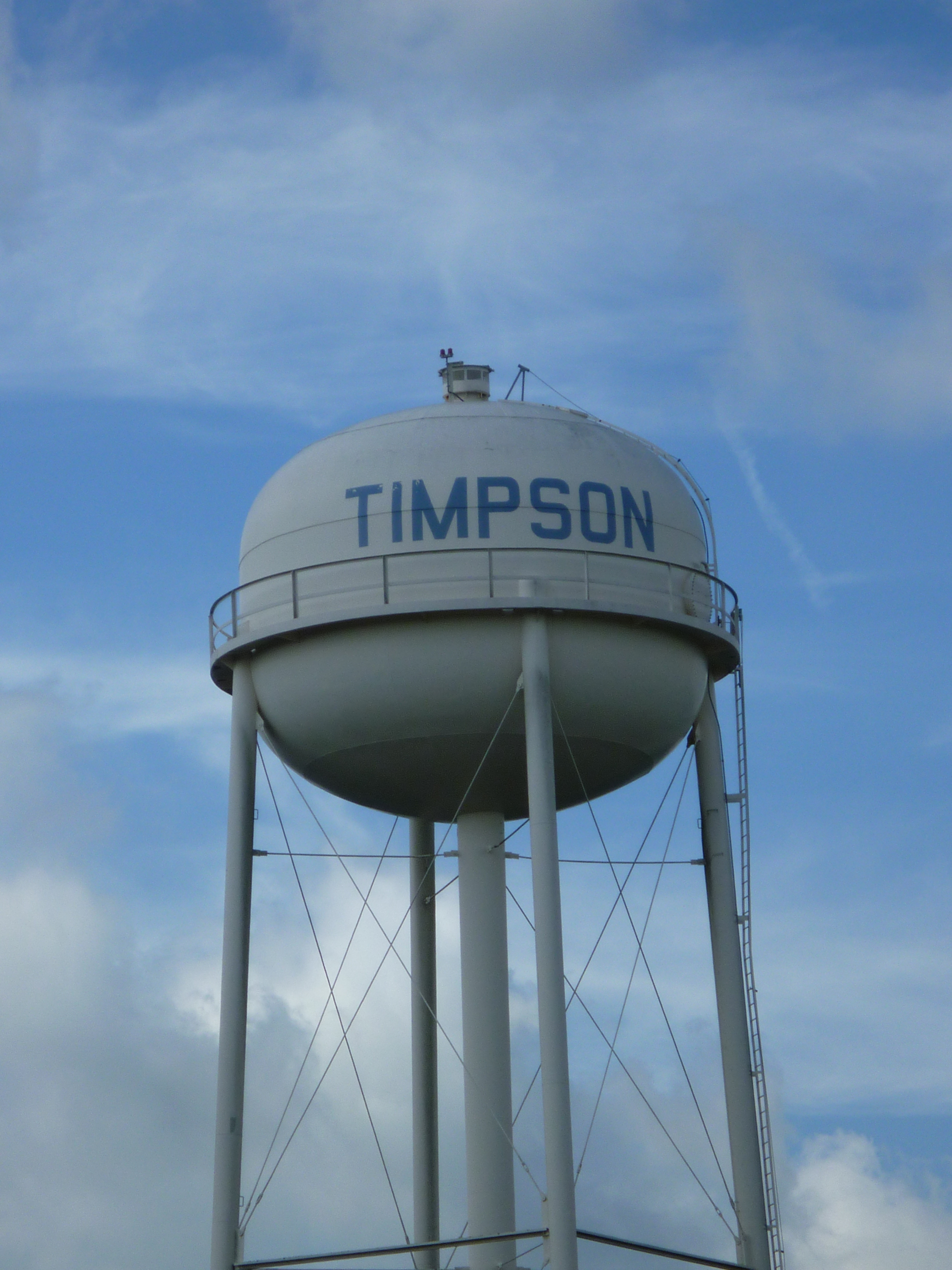
- Water tower near U.S. Route 59 (Future Interstate 69) in Timpson

- Location of Timpson, Texas
- Coordinates: 31°54′23″N 94°23′50″W
- Country: United States
- State: Texas
- County: Shelby

Area
  - Total: 2.52 sq mi (6.52 km^{2})
  - Land: 2.51 sq mi (6.51 km^{2})
  - Water: 0.0039 sq mi (0.01 km^{2})
- Elevation: 394 ft (120 m)

Population (2020)
  - Total: 989
  - Density: 451.5/sq mi (174.32/km^{2})
- Time zone: UTC-6 (Central (CST))
  - Summer (DST): UTC-5 (CDT)
- ZIP code: 75975
- Area code: 936
- FIPS code: 48-73076
- GNIS feature ID: 2412071
- Website: https://www.cityoftimpson.com Website

Timpson is a city in Shelby County, Texas, United States. Its population was 989 at the 2020 census. The community is named after T.B Timpson, a railroad engineer.

== History ==
Timpson was founded in 1885 upon the arrival of the Houston, East and West Texas Railway. It reached its maximum population in 1925, when it was important in the shipping of lignite.

The town became well known in the 1930s and 1940s from the popularity of the Tex Ritter song "Tenaha, Timpson, Bobo, and Blair", which refers to the string of towns in Shelby County.

== Geography ==
According to the United States Census Bureau, the city has a total area of 2.5 square miles (6.5 km^{2}), of which 0.40% is covered by water.

Timpson is located at the convergence of U.S. Route 59 (Future Interstate 69) and U.S. Route 84.

Like all "railroad" towns, Timpson was laid out with the railroad, and not north and south as most towns are. Therefore, the streets run at an angle of 43° "off". When the town was incorporated, Charlie Noblet's map was adopted and is now on record at the county seat; it is the official map of the city today.

== Demographics ==
Historical population
Census	Pop.	Note	%±
1890	518		—
1910	1,528		—
1920	1,526		−0.1%
1930	1,545		1.2%
1940	1,494		−3.3%
1950	1,455		−2.6%
1960	1,120		−23.0%
1970	1,254		12.0%
1980	1,164		−7.2%
1990	1,029		−11.6%
2000	1,094		6.3%
2010	1,155		5.6%
2020	989		−14.4%
U.S. Decennial Census

=== 2020 census ===
As of the 2020 census, 989 people, 412 households, and 279 families resided in the city. The median age was 37.1 years; 27.3% of residents were under 18 and 17.0% were 65 or older. For every 100 females, there were 90.6 males, and for every 100 females 18 and over, there were 83.4 males 18 and over.

None of the residents lived in urban areas, while 100.0% lived in rural areas.

Of the 412 households in Timpson, 29.1% had children under 18 living in them, 29.1% were married-couple households, 24.3% were households with a male householder and no spouse or partner present, and 43.2% were households with a female householder and no spouse or partner present. About 38.6% of all households were made up of individuals, and 19.9% had someone living alone who was 65 or older.

The city had 514 housing units, of which 19.8% were vacant. The homeowner vacancy rate was 0.4% and the rental vacancy rate was 9.1%.

Racial composition as of the 2020 census
Race	Number	Percentage
White	529	53.5%
Black or African American	318	32.2%
American Indian and Alaska Native	5	0.5%
Asian	6	0.6%
Native Hawaiian and other Pacific Islander	0	0.0%
Some other race	44	4.4%
Two or more races	87	8.8%
Hispanics or Latinos (of any race)	117	11.8%

=== 2000 census ===
As of the 2000 census, 1,094 people, 456 households, and 269 families lived in the city. The population density was 437.3 inhabitants per square mile (168.8/km^{2}). The 559 housing units had an average density of 223.4 per square mile (86.3/km^{2}). The racial makeup of the city was 60.51% White, 35.56% African American, 0.64% Native American, 0.09% Asian, 2.38% from other races, and 0.82% from two or more races. Hispanics or Latinos of any race were 4.48% of the population.

Of thee 456 households, 27.2% had children under 18 living with them, 38.6% were married couples living together, 16.9% had a female householder with no husband present, and 40.8% were not families; 36.6% of all households were made up of individuals, and 24.8% had someone living alone who was 65 or older. The average household size was 2.40, and the average family size was 3.18.

In the city, the age distribution was 29.1% under 18, 8.0% from 18 to 24, 22.5% from 25 to 44, 18.3% from 45 to 64, and 22.2% who were 65 or older. The median age was 37 years. For every 100 females, there were 72.8 males. For every 100 females 18 and over, there were 71.3 males.

The median income in the city for a household was $17,500 and for a family was $24,271. Males had a median income of $21,765 versus $19,000 for females. The per capita income for the city was $11,734. About 25.5% of families and 32.4% of the population were below the poverty line, including 46.8% of those under 18 and 23.7% of those 65 or over.

== Education ==
Public education in the city of Timpson is provided by the Timpson Independent School District and home to the Timpson High School Bears.

== Media ==
The Light and Champion, a news and information company, marked its 140th year of operation in 2017. It serves Shelby County, as well as Logansport, Louisiana. The Light and Champion produces a weekly print edition, a weekly free-distribution print product called The Merchandiser, operates a web site, www.lightandchampion.com, and a Facebook page. The Light and Champion is owned by Times Media Group, based in Tempe, Arizona.

== Lake Timpson ==
Lake Timpson is a reservoir in Shelby County. The latitude and longitude coordinates for this reservoir are 31.8443, -94.4291 and the altitude is 318 ft (97 m) above mean sea level.

Lake Timpson Dam on Blackwater Creekis used for recreation. Construction was completed in 1956. It is owned by Shelby County Freshwater Supply District No 1, located in Timpson. Lake Timpson Dam is of earthen construction. The core is homogeneous, earth. The foundation is unlisted or unknown. Its height is 30 feet (9.1 m) with a length of 1,480 feet (450 m). Maximum discharge is 12,773 cubic feet (361.7 m^{3}) per second. Its capacity is 60,148 acre-feet (74,191,000 m^{3}). Normal storage is 1,881 acre-feet (2,320,000 m^{3}).

The most popular game fish at Timpson Reservoir is the largemouth bass. Numbers of bass are relatively high and an excellent fishery exists. Due to the 14-21 inch slot limit, Timpson produces a good number of trophy-sized bass. Crappie and catfish are present in the reservoir, but numbers are relatively low and few anglers target these species. Bluegill and redear sunfish provide fair fishing, especially for youth or inexperienced anglers.

== Notable people ==
- Bert Coan, football player, was born in Timpson
- Ardath Mayhar, fantasy and science-fiction writer, was born in Timpson
- Terry Bussey, football player, was born in Timpson
