= Garrett Gilbert =

American football player (born 1991)

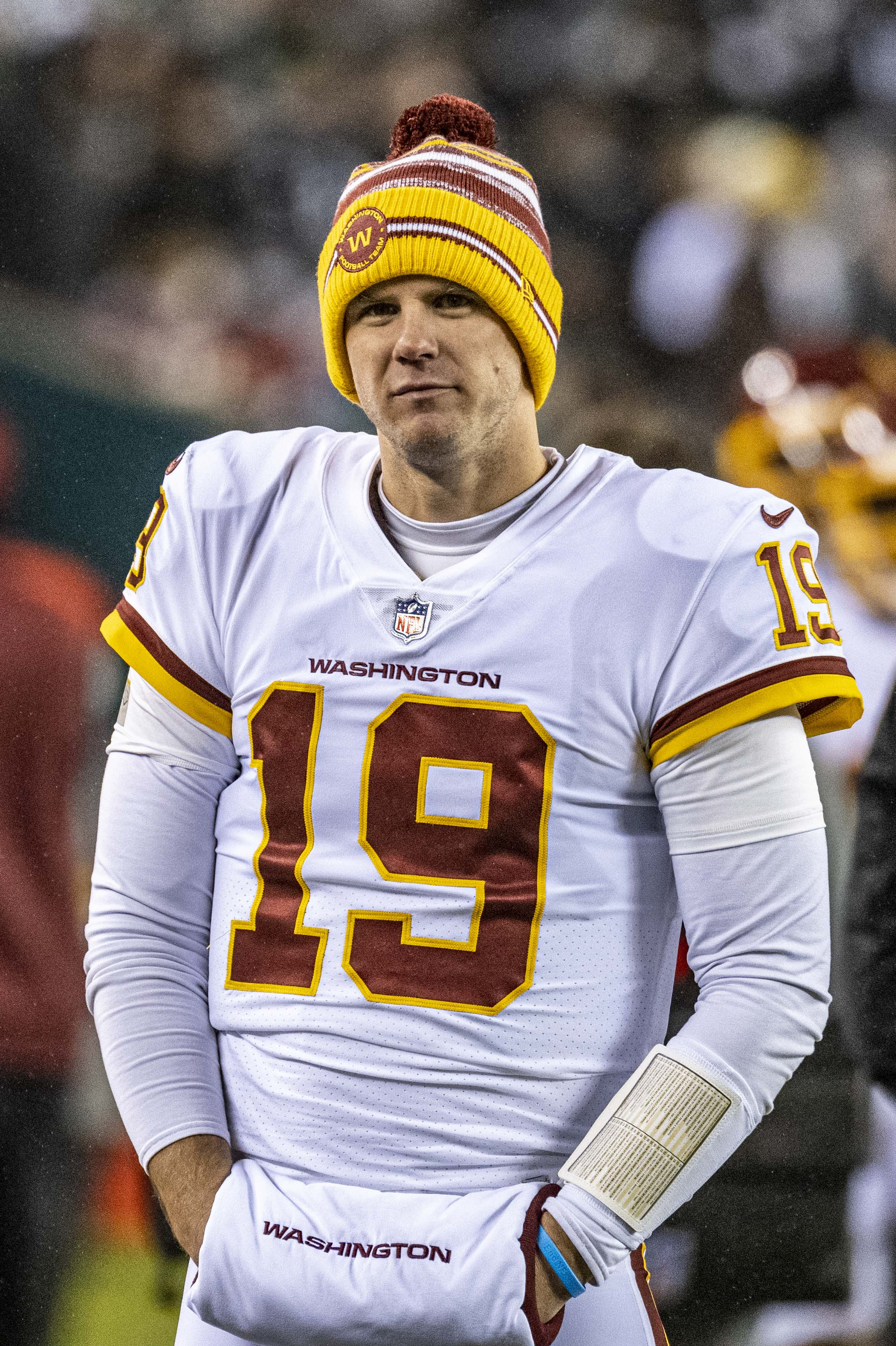
- Gilbert with the Washington Football Team in 2021

No. 3, 19
- Position: Quarterback

Personal information
- Born: July 1, 1991 (age 35); Buffalo, New York, U.S.
- Listed height: 6 ft 4 in (1.93 m)
- Listed weight: 221 lb (100 kg)

Career information
- High school: Lake Travis (Austin, Texas)
- College: Texas (2009–2011); SMU (2012–2013)
- NFL draft: 2014: 6th round, 214th overall pick

Career history
- St. Louis Rams (2014)*; New England Patriots (2014–2015)*; Detroit Lions (2015)*; Oakland Raiders (2015–2016)*; Carolina Panthers (2017–2018); Orlando Apollos (2019); Cleveland Browns (2019–2020); Dallas Cowboys (2020); New England Patriots (2021)*; Washington Football Team (2021); Las Vegas Raiders (2022)*; New England Patriots (2022)
- * Offseason or practice squad member only

Awards and highlights
- Super Bowl champion (XLIX); AAF MVP (2019); AAF passing yards leader (2019)

Career NFL statistics
- Passing attempts: 75
- Passing completions: 43
- Completion percentage: 57.3%
- TD–INT: 1–1
- Passing yards: 477
- Passer rating: 75.2
- Stats at Pro Football Reference

Garrett Antone Gilbert (born July 1, 1991) is an American former professional football quarterback who played in the National Football League (NFL) for seven seasons. He played college football for the Texas Longhorns and SMU Mustangs.

Joining the NFL in 2014, Gilbert was primarily assigned to his teams' practice squads during his first four years and appeared in only one game with the Carolina Panthers. In 2019, he was the starting quarterback for the Orlando Apollos of the Alliance of American Football (AAF), where he led the league in passing yards and passer rating. Gilbert rejoined the NFL after the AAF suspended operations and started games for the Dallas Cowboys and Washington Football Team.

== Early life ==
Gilbert made his first high school start for Lake Travis during his sophomore year in the 2006 Texas Football Classic, where he led the Cavaliers to a 41–34 victory over Texas City. His performance caused Texas gridiron sportswriters to take notice, including Lone Star Gridiron's Chris Doelle who referred to Gilbert as "the best high school quarterback I have seen EVER."

Gilbert guided Lake Travis to the 2007 Texas UIL Class 4A Division II State Championship. Upon completing the 2007 season, he broke state records for completions (359), pass attempts (555) and yards (4,827).

After Lake Travis won the 2007 championship, the team's head coach, Jeff Dicus, resigned to take the head coaching position at Class 5A Duncanville High School. Chad Morris, then the head coach at Stephenville High School, became the new coach. Prior to his senior season, Gilbert learned Morris' offense.

On top of the coaching change, Gilbert had to undergo minor shoulder surgery, from which he took five months to recover. He was not able to lift weights during the five-month period, and instead performed rehabilitation exercises. Gilbert recovered in time to play the first game of the 2008 season.

In the 2008 season, Gilbert led Lake Travis to a perfect 16–0 record and its second straight state title. He finished the season with 4,851 passing yards for 55 touchdowns.

Gilbert completed his high school career setting a state record of 12,534 passing yards, breaking the previous mark set by Graham Harrell by two yards. Gilbert finished second to Harrell for career touchdowns, completions and attempts. He led his Cavaliers to a 39–4 combined record as a starter from his sophomore through senior seasons.

=== Football events ===
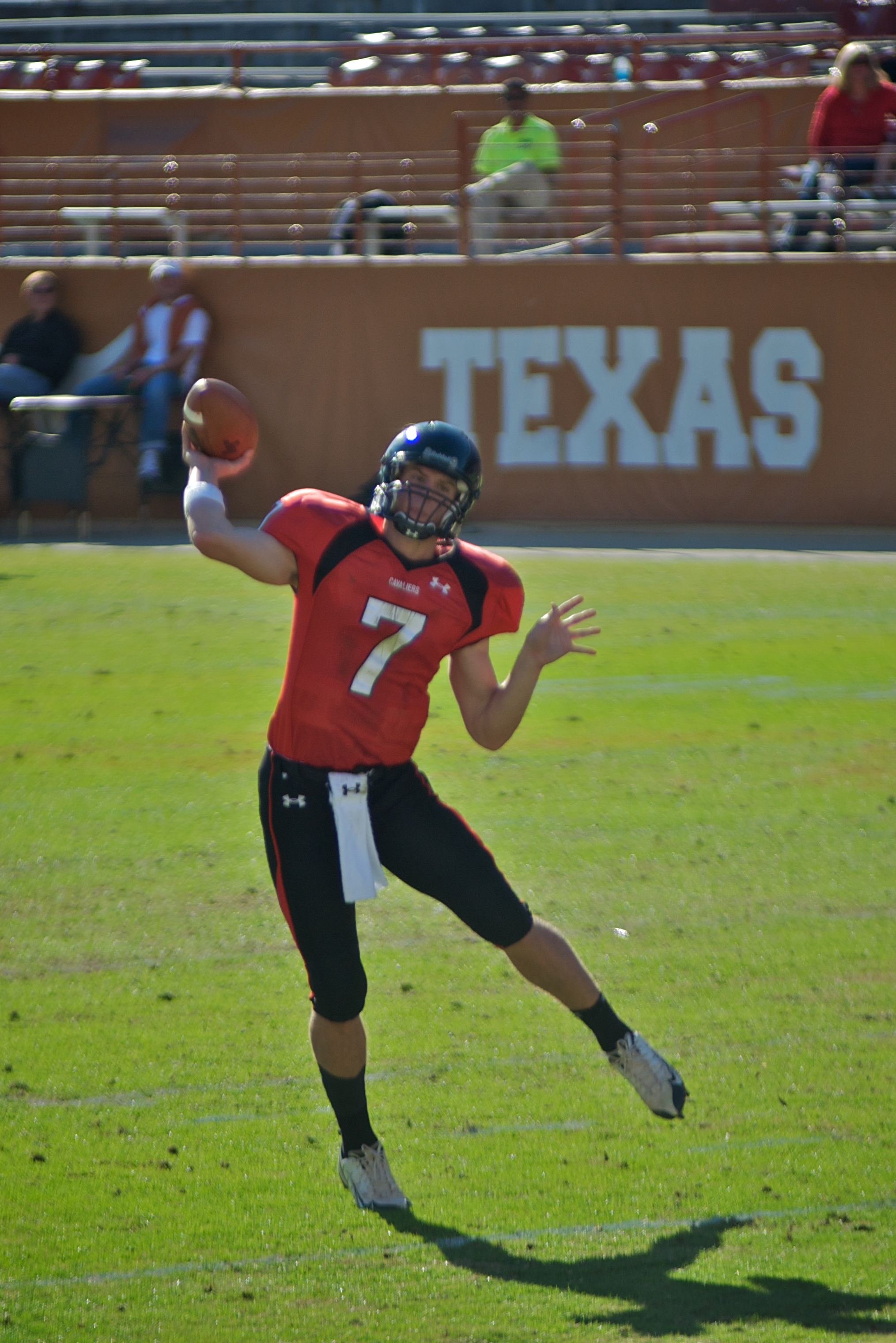
Gilbert playing for his high school in 2008.

Gilbert participated in ESPN RISE's 10th anniversary Elite 11 quarterback event from July 21–24. He was one of the 11 high school quarterbacks selected out of a pool of more than a thousand. The Elite 11 played against each other and received coaching from current standout college quarterbacks. An ESPN columnist pointed out that Gilbert was the most likely player from the camp to win the college football national championship.

Along with 79 other high school seniors, Gilbert played in the 2009 Under Armour All-America Game on January 4, 2009. In the nationally televised matchup, Gilbert completed 11-of-22 passes for 161 yards and an interception as he guided the Black team in its 27–16 loss to the White team.

=== College recruitment ===
Gilbert verbally committed to play college football for the Texas Longhorns on February 7, 2008, the day after he received the offer in the mail. He always had aspirations to play for Texas since he was a child. During his youth, he pretended to play football for the Longhorns, passing the football to himself in his living room and diving onto the couch to catch it. When he was eight, he had the chance to play catch with then-Texas quarterback Major Applewhite, whom he considered to be his idol growing up. His family members were also season ticket holders.

Gilbert was rated as a five-star prospect by Rivals.com. Alongside Matt Barkley of Mater Dei High School in California, Gilbert was the premier quarterback prospect of the class of 2009. Former college head coach Jackie Sherrill called Gilbert the best quarterback he has seen since Dan Marino.

== College career ==
=== 2009 season ===
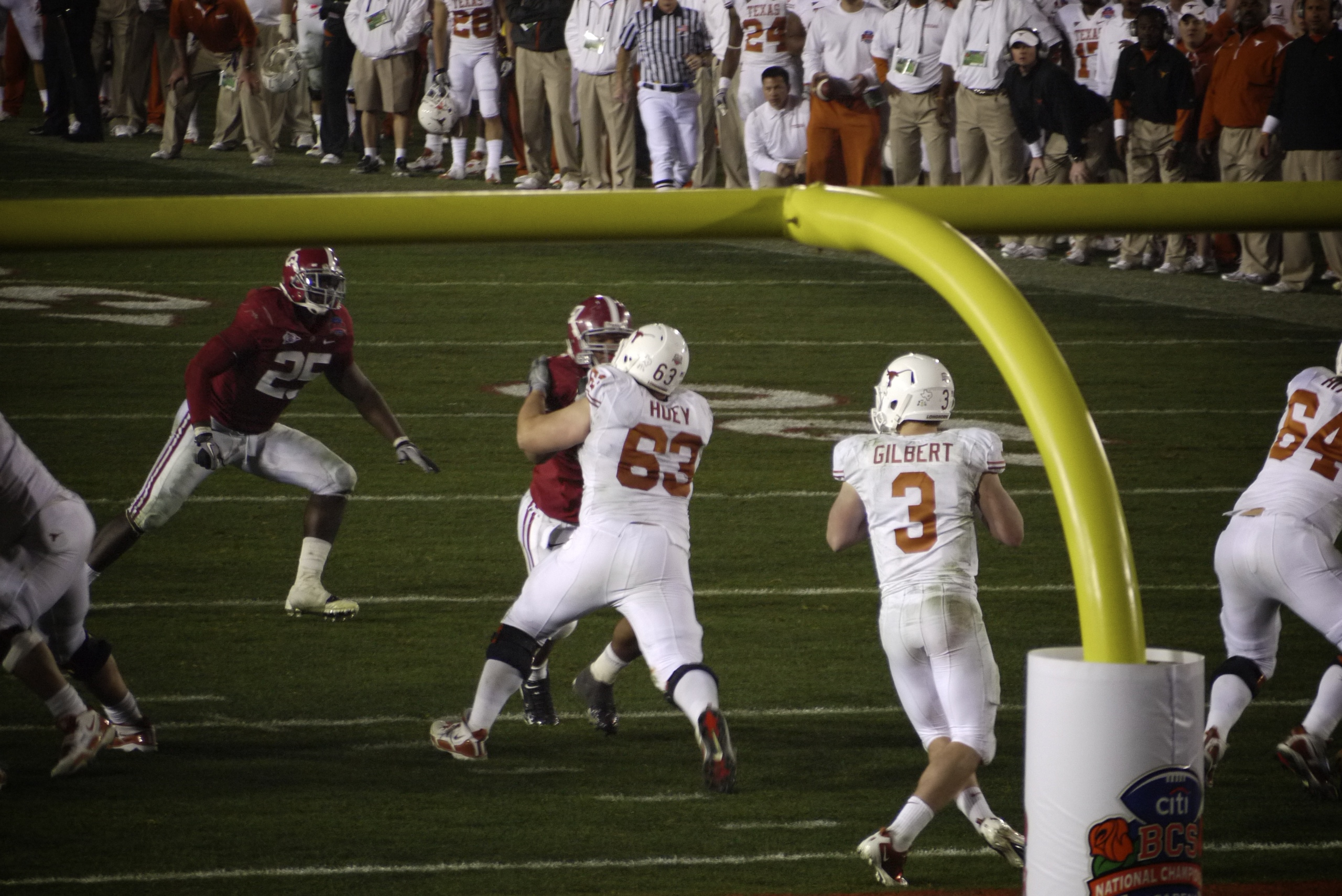
Gilbert drops back for a pass in the BCS National Championship game.

It was at first thought that Gilbert would likely redshirt in 2009 and compete for the starting job in 2010. However, since former backup quarterback John Chiles was moved to wide receiver, Gilbert competed with Sherrod Harris for the backup job during the off-season. On August 23, 2009, Gilbert became the second-string quarterback as a true freshman, in front of the junior Harris.

In the 2009 season opener against Louisiana-Monroe, Gilbert lined up behind center during the fourth quarter and drove the Longhorns down the field, completing four-of-five passes for 46 yards, before scoring a twelve-yard rushing touchdown on a quarterback draw play to end the drive.

On January 7, 2010, in the BCS National Championship Game, Gilbert replaced the injured Colt McCoy. Gilbert completed 15-of-40 passes for 186 yards, two touchdowns, and four interceptions. One analyst took the position that his stat line did not reflect how well he actually played (even though he was responsible for five turnovers – the four interceptions and a lost fumble), and that several of his passes that should have been caught were dropped. Gilbert led the Longhorns to two scoring drives in the second half to spark a comeback, bringing the score to 24–21 Alabama. However, the comeback ultimately fell short late in the game with a turnover inside the Texas five–yard line. The Longhorns lost the game 37–21.

=== 2010 season ===
Gilbert was the starting quarterback during 2010 season. He led the team to a 5–7 record, Texas' first losing season since 1997. Against Kansas State, he threw for 5 interceptions as the Longhorns lost by a score of 39–14. In that game, Kansas State also only attempted four passes. Soon after that year's bowl season, Mack Brown announced that every job was up for grabs, leaving Gilbert to compete with sophomores Case McCoy and Conner Wood, as well as freshman David Ash.

=== 2011 season ===
On August 29, it was announced that Gilbert would retain the starting position in the season opener against Rice. However, on September 12, it was announced that he was being demoted to the second-string quarterback behind Case McCoy and Ash, who would share the starting position. On September 20, it was announced that Gilbert underwent successful surgery on his shoulder and was ruled out the remainder of the season.

Gilbert was granted his unconditional release from Texas on October 5, allowing him the opportunity to seek a transfer. Later that day, he was seen at Southern Methodist University (SMU), watching the football team practice. He completed his degree at Texas and transferred to SMU for the 2012 season.

=== 2012 season ===
Gilbert won the starting job at SMU, where he ran June Jones's run and shoot offense. He began the season with an inconsistent performance at Baylor, throwing two interceptions in the 59–24 loss.

As the season progressed, Gilbert gained confidence, completing four touchdown passes against Houston en route to a 72–42 win, a game which set the SMU record for points in a game. He had his best game of the season the following week against Memphis, throwing for 353 yards with one passing touchdown and two rushing touchdowns. Overall, he finished the 2012 season with 2,932 passing yards, 15 touchdowns, and 15 interceptions.

=== 2013 season ===
Gilbert passed for 3,528 yards and 21 touchdowns in 2013. He missed two games due to injury. He finished his college career with 9,761 yards and 49 touchdowns.

== Professional career ==
=== St. Louis Rams ===
Gilbert was selected by the St. Louis Rams in the sixth round (214th overall) of the 2014 NFL draft. He was released during final cuts on August 29, 2014. He was signed to the Rams' practice squad on September 1, 2014. He was cut from the practice squad on October 30, 2014.

=== New England Patriots (first stint) ===
On December 17, 2014, the New England Patriots signed Gilbert to their practice squad. He remained on the practice squad when the Patriots defeated the Seattle Seahawks 28–24 in Super Bowl XLIX.

On June 11, 2015, the Patriots waived Gilbert.

=== Detroit Lions ===
One day after being waived by the Patriots, Gilbert was claimed off waivers by the Detroit Lions. He was waived on September 1, 2015.

=== Oakland Raiders ===
On September 6, 2015, Gilbert was signed to the practice squad of the Oakland Raiders. He was waived on May 24, 2016. On January 2, 2017, he was signed to the Raiders' practice squad after Matt McGloin suffered an injury in the final game of the regular season. Gilbert was to serve as the backup in case McGloin was unable to play in the wild-card round. McGloin ended up being active as Connor Cook's backup for the playoff game. Gilbert was not re-signed after the season.

=== Carolina Panthers ===
After working out with the Dallas Cowboys in January, Gilbert signed with the Carolina Panthers on March 24, 2017. He was waived on September 2, 2017, and was signed to the Panthers' practice squad the next day. He was promoted to the active roster, for the first time in his career, on October 16, 2017.

After losing the back-up quarterback job to Taylor Heinicke during training camp he was waived on September 1, 2018.

Gilbert was re-signed by the Panthers on December 26, 2018, after Cam Newton and Heinicke were both shut down for the season. He served as the backup to Kyle Allen in the Panthers' last game of the season. He made his NFL debut in relief of the injured Allen. He completed his first career pass to Ian Thomas for 31 yards. He finished the game with 40 yards passing. On December 31, 2018, Gilbert was waived by the Panthers.

=== Orlando Apollos ===
On November 27, 2018, Gilbert was selected by the Orlando Apollos in the Alliance of American Football's quarterback draft. He played for the team during the inaugural 2019 AAF season.

During the inaugural game of the 2019 season against the Atlanta Legends, Gilbert went 15 for 25 for 227 yards, with two passing touchdowns and a receiving score in the 40–6 win. He also threw the first touchdown in both Apollos and Alliance history, with a 26-yard toss to Jalin Marshall.

In Week 2 of the 2019 season, Gilbert won Offensive Player of the Week with a 393-yard, two-touchdown performance in the 37–29 win over the San Antonio Commanders, and set an early AAF record for passing yards in a single game.

When the AAF suspended operations after Week 8, Gilbert led the league in passing yards (2,152), attempts (259), completions (157), and passer rating (99.1). He was also second in passing touchdowns (13), second-lowest in interceptions (3), lowest in interception percentage (1.2), and second-highest in touchdown percentage (5.0) among all starting quarterbacks.

=== Cleveland Browns ===
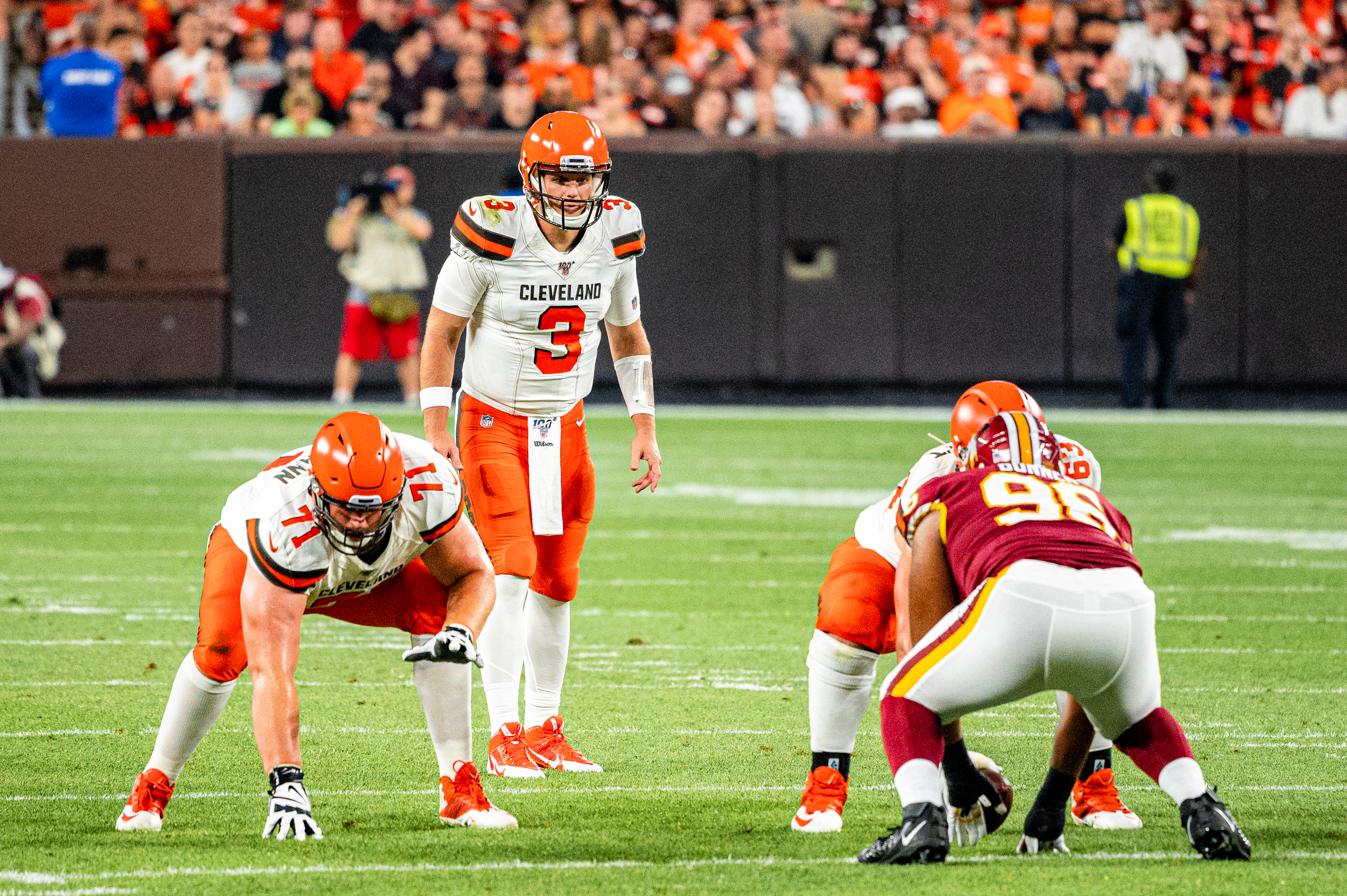
Gilbert playing against the Washington Redskins in the 2019 preseason.

On April 5, 2019, following the AAF's suspension of operations, Gilbert signed with the Cleveland Browns of the NFL. He made his debut with the Browns in Week 5, relieving Baker Mayfield in the fourth quarter of a 3–31 loss to the San Francisco 49ers.

Gilbert was placed on the reserve/COVID-19 list by the Browns on August 3, 2020, but was activated two days later. On September 5, 2020, Gilbert was waived by the Browns, but re-signed to their practice squad the next day.

=== Dallas Cowboys ===
On October 12, 2020, Gilbert was signed by Cowboys off the Browns practice squad as a backup to Andy Dalton after Dak Prescott suffered a season-ending ankle injury. The move relocated him back to Texas.

On November 7, 2020, Gilbert was named the starting quarterback for the Cowboys’ week 9 game against the undefeated Pittsburgh Steelers, due to Dalton being on the reserve/COVID-19 list and Ben DiNucci’s struggles the previous week against Philadelphia. In his first NFL start, he threw for 243 yards, one touchdown, and one interception, nearly pulling off an upset as the Cowboys ultimately lost 24–19. He returned to a backup role the rest of the season behind Dalton.

Gilbert was the starter for Dallas in the Hall of Fame game on August 5, 2021. He was released from the Cowboys during final roster cuts on August 31, 2021.

=== New England Patriots (second stint) ===
On September 2, 2021, Gilbert was signed to the Patriots' practice squad.

=== Washington Football Team ===
On December 17, 2021, the Washington Football Team signed Gilbert off the Patriots' practice squad after both Taylor Heinicke and Kyle Allen were placed on the team's COVID-19 reserve list that same week. With Heinicke and Allen out, Gilbert started against the Philadelphia Eagles on December 21, 2021, just four days after signing with the team. He went 20 of 31 with 194 yards as Washington lost 27–17.

=== Las Vegas Raiders ===
On March 19, 2022, Gilbert signed a contract with the Las Vegas Raiders. On May 12, 2022, the Raiders released Gilbert after trading for Patriots backup quarterback Jarrett Stidham.

=== New England Patriots (third stint) ===
On October 4, Gilbert signed to the Patriots practice squad. On October 15, Gilbert was elevated to the active roster to be the backup quarterback to rookie Bailey Zappe as both Mac Jones and Brian Hoyer were both injured. The elevation was via a standard elevation which caused him to revert back to the practice squad after the game. His practice squad contract with the team expired after the season on January 8, 2023.

== Career statistics ==
Legend
**Bold**	Career high

=== Professional ===
Year	Team	League	Games		Passing								Rushing				Fumbles	
Year	Team	League	GP	GS	Cmp	Att	Pct	Yds	Avg	TD	Int	Rtg	Att	Yds	Avg	TD	Fum	Lost
2018	CAR	NFL	1	0	2	3	**66.7**	40	**13.3**	0	0	**109.7**	0	0	0	0	0	0
2019	ORL	AAF	8	8	**157**	**259**	60.6	**2,152**	8.3	**13**	**3**	99.1	**24**	**79**	3.3	**1**	**4**	**3**
2019	CLE	NFL	5	0	0	3	0.0	0	0	0	0	39.6	3	-3	-1	0	0	0
2020	DAL	NFL	1	1	21	38	55.2	243	6.4	1	1	72.6	3	28	**9.3**	0	0	0
2021	WAS	NFL	1	1	20	31	64.5	194	6.3	0	0	81.9	0	0	0.0	0	1	0
NFL totals			8	2	43	75	57.3	477	6.4	1	1	75.3	6	25	4.2	0	1	0
AAF totals			8	8	157	259	60.6	2,152	8.3	13	3	99.1	24	79	3.3	1	4	3

=== College ===
Season	Team	Games		Passing								Rushing			
Season	Team	GP	GS	Cmp	Att	Pct	Yds	Y/A	TD	Int	Rtg	Att	Yds	Avg	TD
2009	Texas	10	0	30	66	45.5	310	4.7	2	4	82.8	11	5	0.5	1
2010	Texas	12	12	260	441	59.0	2,744	6.2	10	**17**	111.0	**100**	**380**	**3.8**	5
2011	Texas	2	2	15	31	48.4	247	**8.0**	1	2	113.1	7	15	2.1	0
2012	SMU	13	13	268	**506**	53.0	2,932	5.8	15	15	105.5	94	346	3.7	**8**
2013	SMU	10	10	**335**	504	**66.5**	**3,528**	7.0	**21**	7	**136.2**	83	267	3.2	6
Career		47	37	908	1,548	58.7	9,761	6.3	49	45	116.3	295	1,013	3.4	20

== Career highlights ==
=== Awards and honors ===
NFL

- Super Bowl champion (XLIX)

AAF

- AAF MVP (2019)
- AAF passing yards leader (2019)

High school

- 2007, 2008 Austin American-Statesman Player of the Year (became the first player to win the honor outright twice)
- 2008 Mr. Texas Football
- 2008 Gatorade National Football Player of the Year award
- 2008 Texas Associated Press Sports Editors Class 4A all-state team
- 2008 Texas Associated Press Sports Editors Class 4A Player of the Year
- 2008 USA Today Offensive Player of the Year
- 2009 Parade All-American and Player of the Year
- 2008 EA Sports Mr. Football USA
- 2008 Built Ford Tough Class 4A Texas High School Player of the Year
- 2008–2009 MaxPreps Male Athlete of the Year
- 2009 Gatorade Male High School Athlete of the Year

=== Records ===
- UT Record – Attempts, Game (59)
- UT Record – Total Plays, Game (68)
- SMU Record – Passing Yards, Game (538)
- SMU Record – Passing Yards, three consecutive games (1,343)
- SMU Record – Completions, Game (45)
- SMU Record – Attempts, Game (70)
- SMU Record – Total Plays, Game (81)
- SMU Record – Touchdowns, Game (7)
- SMU Record – Total Offense, Game (635)
- SMU Record – Total Offense, Consecutive Games (941)
- SMU Record – 300 Yard Passing Games, Career (9)
- SMU Record – 300 Yard Passing Games, Consecutive (5)

== Personal life ==
Gilbert is the son of former NFL quarterback Gale Gilbert. He was born in Buffalo, New York, where his father played for the Bills in the early 1990s as a member of the teams who lost four consecutive Super Bowls. He moved to San Diego, California, at age three, when Gale signed with the Chargers, who also played in and lost the Super Bowl. To this day, Gale is the only player in NFL history to be a member of five consecutive Super Bowl teams.

The family later moved to Austin, Texas in 1996. Garrett has one brother, Griffin, who played football at Texas Christian University.
