= Ben Wells (gridiron football) =

American gridiron football player (born 1989)

No. 25, 33
- Position: Defensive back

Personal information
- Born: January 9, 1989 (age 37); Beaumont, Texas, U.S.
- Listed height: 6 ft 0 in (1.83 m)
- Listed weight: 194 lb (88 kg)

Career information
- High school: Ozen (Beaumont)
- College: Stephen F. Austin
- NFL draft: 2012: undrafted

Career history
- Montreal Alouettes (2013); Arizona Rattlers (2015)

Career CFL statistics
- Total tackles: 4
- Stats at CFL.ca (archived)

Career AFL statistics
- Total tackles: 39
- Pass deflections: 3
- Stats at ArenaFan.com

Ben Wells (born January 9, 1989) is an American former professional football defensive back who played for the Montreal Alouettes of the Canadian Football League (CFL) and the Arizona Rattlers of the Arena Football League (AFL). He played college football at the University of Texas at Austin and Stephen F. Austin State University.

== Early life ==
Wells participated in football, basketball and track and field at Ozen High School in Beaumont, Texas. He was named first-team 4A all-state by the Associated Press and Texas Sports Writers Association his senior year. He played in the 2007 Offense-Defense All-American Bowl. He also earned first-team 22-4A all-district and first-team All-Greater Houston honors as a junior. Wells started his prep career as a wide receiver before switching to defense his junior year. He was the #88 ranked player nationally by Rivals.com in 2007.

== College career ==
Wells played for the Texas Longhorns from 2008 to 2009. He was redshirted in 2007. He transferred to Stephen F. Austin State University and played for the Stephen F. Austin Lumberjacks from 2010 to 2011. Wells was also selected to play in the NFLPA Collegiate Bowl for top seniors in football.

== Professional career ==
After going undrafted in the 2012 NFL draft, Wells attended rookie minicamp on a tryout basis with the Washington Redskins.

Wells signed a two-year contract with the Montreal Alouettes of the Canadian Football League on May 13, 2013. He was released by the Alouettes on June 11, 2014.

Wells was signed by the Arizona Rattlers of the Arena Football League on September 25, 2014. On March 22, 2016, Wells was placed on reassignment.

== Later life ==
Wells went into coaching after his playing career ended. In 2021 he was the head coach and athletic coordinator at Horace Mann Junior School in Baytown, Texas. In 2022 he was hired as the defensive coordinator at Aldine Nimitz High School. In 2024, he was hired as the defensive coordinator at Conroe High School.

In 2025, Wells was hired as the Director of Player Personnel for Texas State Football. In 2026, he was hired as the Associate Director of Scouting for University of Texas Football.
