= Marvin Mims =

American football player (born 2002)

Marvin Mims Jr.
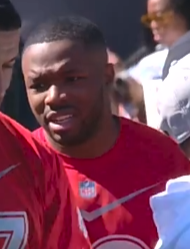
- Mims at the 2024 Pro Bowl Games

No. 19 – Denver Broncos
- Positions: Wide receiver, Return specialist
- Roster status: Active

Personal information
- Born: March 19, 2002 (age 24); Frisco, Texas, U.S.
- Listed height: 5 ft 11 in (1.80 m)
- Listed weight: 182 lb (83 kg)

Career information
- High school: Lone Star (Frisco)
- College: Oklahoma (2020–2022)
- NFL draft: 2023: 2nd round, 63rd overall pick

Career history
- Denver Broncos (2023–present)

Awards and highlights
- First-team All-Pro (2024) (Note: Selected as a punt returner); Second-team All-Pro (2023) (Note: Selected as a kick returner); 2× Pro Bowl (2023, 2024); NFL punt return yards leader (2025); PFWA All-Rookie Team (2023); First-team All-Big 12 (2022); Second-team All-Big 12 (2020); NFL records: Career yards per punt return: 15.1

Career NFL statistics as of Week 9, 2026
- Receptions: 108
- Receiving yards: 1,294
- Receiving touchdowns: 8
- Punt return yards: 1,300
- Punt return touchdowns: 1
- Kick return yards: 1,455
- Kick return touchdowns: 1
- Rushing yards: 180
- Rushing touchdowns: 1
- Stats at Pro Football Reference

Marvin D. Mims Jr. (born March 19, 2002) is an American professional football wide receiver and return specialist for the Denver Broncos of the National Football League (NFL). He played college football for the Oklahoma Sooners.

== Early life ==
Mims grew up in Frisco, Texas and attended Lone Star High School. He was named the District 5-5A-I Offensive MVP in his junior season after posting 1,158 yards and 14 touchdowns. As a senior Mims set a national record with 2,629 receiving yards on 117 receptions with 32 touchdown catches and was named Mr. Texas Football and first team USA Today High School All-American. Mims finished his high school career with a state record 5,485 receiving yards. Mims initially committed to play college football for the Stanford Cardinal over offers from Notre Dame and TCU, but later decommitted during his senior year in favor of attending Oklahoma.

== College career ==
Mims joined the Oklahoma Sooners in January 2020 as an early enrollee. In his first game at Oklahoma, Mims caught 3 passes for 80 yards and a touchdown against Missouri State and scored 2 more touchdowns the following week in a loss to Kansas State. Mims finished his freshman season with team highs of 37 receptions, 610 receiving yards and 9 touchdown receptions, which was also a school freshman record, and was named second team All-Big 12 and an FWAA Freshman All-American. As a sophomore, he led the Sooners with 705 receiving yards on 32 catches with 5 touchdowns. As a junior in 2022 Mims topped his squad with 54 receptions for 1,083 yards (ranking sixth in the country with 20.1 yards per catch average) and six scores in 13 games. Mims also returned kicks (3–70–23.3) and punts (33–391–11.8) during his college career, receiving 2022 honorable mention All-Big 12 Conference honors for his punt return efforts. Mims declared for the 2023 NFL draft following the 2022 season.

== Professional career ==
Pre-draft measurables
Height	Weight	Arm length	Hand span	Wingspan	40-yard dash	10-yard split	20-yard split	Three-cone drill	Vertical jump	Broad jump
5 ft 10 7/8 in (1.80 m)	183 lb (83 kg)	31 5/8 in (0.80 m)	9 in (0.23 m)	6 ft 2 3/4 in (1.90 m)	4.38 s	1.55 s	2.51 s	6.90 s	39.5 in (1.00 m)	10 ft 9 in (3.28 m)
All values from NFL Combine

Mims was selected by the Denver Broncos in the second round, 63rd overall, of the 2023 NFL draft.

In Week 2 against Washington, Mims had two receptions for 113 yards and a touchdown in the 35–33 loss. In Week 3, Mims returned a kickoff for a touchdown, although the Dolphins still won 70–20. In Week 10, Mims returned two punts that led to touchdowns, along with a 31-yard kick return, in a 24–22 win over the Buffalo Bills, earning AFC Special Teams Player of the Week. In Week 16, Mims fumbled while returning a kickoff, which lead to a recovery and subsequent touchdown by safety Cody Davis to increase the Patriots' lead to 23–7. The Broncos would eventually lose the game 23–26 despite nearly mounting a fourth quarter comeback, effectively ending the Broncos playoff aspirations for the season as their record fell to 7–8. After the game, Mims took responsibility for the loss, stating: "That’s a 14-point swing. It cost us at the end. I got to be better, I know that. At the end of the day, I mean things happen, but I just know I got to be better." He appeared in 16 games and started seven as a rookie. He finished with 22 receptions for 377 receiving yards and one receiving touchdown, as well as a kick return touchdown. As a returner, he was named to the 2024 Pro Bowl Games, the 2023 All-Pro Team, and the 2023 PFWA All-Rookie Team.

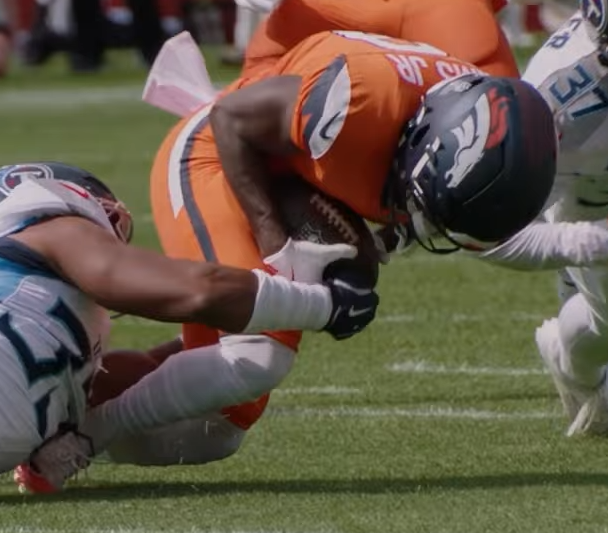
Mims with the Broncos in 2025

During the 2024 season, Mims began taking snaps at running back. On December 2, 2024 in a Week 13 Monday Night Football matchup against the Cleveland Browns, Mims caught a 93-yard touchdown pass by quarterback Bo Nix from the Broncos' own end zone. During Week 15 against the Indianapolis Colts, Mims had 97 punt return yards, which included a 61-yard return in the fourth quarter that set up a Nate Adkins touchdown reception to give the Broncos the lead, which they would not relinquish for the rest of the game. Upon defeating the Colts the Broncos moved to 9–5, securing their first winning season since 2016 and increasing their chances of making the playoffs for the first time since Super Bowl 50 to 91%. Mims was subsequently named the AFC Special Teams Player of the Week for his critical return plays. On offense, Mims finished the season with 39 catches for 503 yards and six receiving touchdowns along with 13 rushes for 42 yards. On special teams, he made 7 kick returns for 194 yards and 26 punt returns for 408 yards, leading the league with 15.7 yards per punt return. He was named First-team All-Pro as a punt returner, and awarded his second Pro Bowl as a return specialist.

In Week 14 of the 2025 season, Mims scored his first career punt return touchdown against the Las Vegas Raiders. Soon after, he was named AFC Special Teams Player of the Week for the third time in his career.

During Week 1 of the 2026 season, Mims set the NFL record for career average yards per punt return, with 15.9.

== Career statistics ==
=== NFL ===
Legend
	NFL record
	Led the League
**Bold**	Career high

==== Regular season ====
Year	Team	Games		Receiving					Rushing					Kick returns					Punt returns					Fumbles	
Year	Team	GP	GS	Rec	Yds	Avg	Lng	TD	Att	Yds	Avg	Lng	TD	Ret	Yds	Avg	Lng	TD	Ret	Yds	Avg	Lng	TD	Fum	Lost
2023	DEN	16	7	22	377	**17.1**	60	1	9	30	3.3	11	0	15	397	26.5	**99**	**1**	19	312	**16.4**	52	0	**2**	**2**
2024	DEN	17	2	**39**	**503**	12.9	**93**	**6**	**13**	42	3.2	**17**	0	7	194	**27.7**	38	0	26	408	15.7	61	0	1	0
2025	DEN	15	4	37	322	8.7	31	1	12	**78**	**6.5**	16	**1**	**25**	**658**	26.3	46	0	**29**	**452**	15.6	**70**	**1**	**2**	1
2026	DEN	7	3	10	92	9.2	47	0	5	30	6.0	14	0	8	206	25.8	39	0	12	128	10.7	26	0	1	0
Career		55	16	108	1,294	12.0	93	8	39	180	4.6	17	1	55	1,455	26.5	99	1	86	1,300	15.1	70	1	6	3

==== Postseason ====
Year	Team	Games		Receiving					Rushing					Kick returns					Punt returns					Fumbles	
Year	Team	GP	GS	Rec	Yds	Avg	Lng	TD	Att	Yds	Avg	Lng	TD	Ret	Yds	Avg	Lng	TD	Ret	Yds	Avg	Lng	TD	Fum	Lost
2024	DEN	1	0	2	12	6.0	15	0	**2**	**1**	**0.5**	**4**	0	0	0	0.0	0	0	1	0	0	0	0	0	0
2025	DEN	2	0	**12**	**155**	**12.9**	**52**	**1**	0	0	0.0	0	0	**2**	**50**	**25.0**	**25**	0	**3**	**8**	**2.7**	**8**	0	0	0
Career		3	0	14	167	11.9	52	1	2	1	0.5	4	0	2	50	25.0	25	0	4	8	2.0	8	0	0	0

=== College ===
Marvin Mims		Receiving			
**Year**	**G**	**Rec**	**Yds**	**Avg**	**TD**
2020	11	37	610	16.5	9
2021	13	32	705	22.0	5
2022	13	54	1,083	20.1	6
**Career**	**37**	**123**	**2,398**	**19.5**	**20**

== Personal life ==
Mims' family is originally from Baton Rouge, Louisiana. He grew up watching the New Orleans Saints and Dallas Cowboys.
