= Texas Football Classic =

High school football event

The official logo of the Toyota Tundra Texas Football Classic.

The Texas Football Classic was a high school football event that took place at the beginning of each football season at the Alamodome in San Antonio, Texas. It was started in 1999 by the staff of Dave Campbell's Texas Football, an annual football publication that highlights every high school, college, and professional team in the state of Texas. Since then, it has grown from three games to five and spans three days, usually over Labor Day weekend.

Among the notable players that have participated in the history of the Classic are Cedric Benson, Kevin Kolb, Drew Tate, and Chase Daniel. The Texas Football Classic was not planned for 2011 due to a lack of resources.

== History ==
=== 1999 ===
- San Antonio Churchill 10, San Antonio Clark 7
- Austin Westlake 42, Humble 20
- Katy 21, Converse Judson 7

=== 2000 ===
- Austin Westlake 17, San Antonio MacArthur 10
- Texas City 39, Stephenville 33
- Midland Lee 40, Victoria Memorial 12

=== 2001 ===
- Bay City 9, LaGrange 0
- San Antonio Madison 59, Corpus Christi Carroll 20
- LaMarque 17, Schertz Clemens 16
- Grapevine 27, Hays Consolidated 13

=== 2002 ===
- Smithson Valley 43, Port Arthur Memorial 13
- Fort Worth Dunbar 35, Brownwood 32
- Copperas Cove 21, Odessa Permian 13
- San Antonio Roosevelt 35, Baytown Lee 14

=== 2003 ===
- San Antonio Alamo Heights 31, Beeville Jones 6
- Corpus Christi Calallen 31, San Marcos 0
- The Woodlands 35, Bryan 20
- Waco High 20, Abilene High 10
- Donna 10, Lubbock Monterey 8

=== 2004 ===
- Kerrville Tivy 18, Pflugerville 15
- Leander 24, Austin Westlake 19
- Southlake Carroll 45, Midland Lee 14
- Pearland 14, Fort Bend Kempner 0
- Stephenville 13, New Braunfels 6

=== 2005 ===
- San Antonio Marshall 28, San Antonio Churchill 24
- Wolfforth Frenship 42, Boerne 24
- San Antonio Reagan 34, Harlingen 11
- LaMarque 35, Bay City 14
- San Antonio O'Connor 44, McAllen 7

=== 2006 ===
- San Antonio Madison 23, Seguin 11
- New Braunfels Canyon 37, Pflugerville Hendrickson 7
- Smithson Valley 17, The Woodlands 7
- Austin Lake Travis 41, Texas City 34
- McAllen Memorial 24, Victoria Memorial 22

=== 2007 ===
- San Antonio Alamo Heights 17, San Antonio Clark 3
- Pflugerville Connally 16, Fredericksburg 6
- Leander 30, A&M Consolidated 12
- Corpus Christi Calallen 21, Laredo United 14
- San Antonio Warren 41, La Joya 0

=== 2008 ===
- Georgetown 35, San Antonio Southwest 13
- Austin Lake Travis 27, Round Rock Westwood 20
- Katy Cinco Ranch 21, San Antonio Reagan 17
- Brownwood 35, Burnet 24
- Port Lavaca Calhoun 54, Mercedes 26

=== 2009 ===
- Floresville 36, Fox Tech 13
- Boerne-Champion 28, Midlothian 24
- Brenham 37, Katy Mayde Creek 14
- Duncanville 33, Odessa Permian 14
- Cibolo Steele 35, SA East Central 14

=== 2010 ===
- Uvalde 20, vs. Seguin 35
- Abilene vs. Belton
- Richmond Foster vs. El Paso Hanks
- Gregory-Portland 22 vs. Port Neches-Groves 21
- Georgetown vs. Killeen Harker Heights
