= Terry Bussey =

American football player (born 2006)

No. 2 – Texas A&M Aggies
- Position: Wide receiver
- Class: Junior

Personal information
- Born: August 13, 2006 (age 20); Timpson, Texas, U.S.
- Listed height: 6 ft 0 in (1.83 m)
- Listed weight: 195 lb (88 kg)

Career information
- High school: Timpson (Timpson, Texas)
- College: Texas A&M (2024–present)

Awards and highlights
- Mr. Texas Football (2022)
- Stats at ESPN

Terry Bussey (born August 13, 2006) is an American college football wide receiver for the Texas A&M Aggies.

== Early life ==
Bussey was raised by his single mother, Nanette, with his two sisters in Timpson, Texas. His uncle, Domingo Bryant, played in the NFL. Bussey's mother died of a stroke when he was 14, and Bussey began living with his school's principal, Jerrod Campbell, on weekdays and with his older sister TyKuirra, who had moved to her boyfriend's house, on weekends. However, a few months later, his sister was shot and killed, and Bussey moved in permanently with Campbell.

== High school career ==
Bussey attended Timpson High School where he competed in four sports – football, baseball, basketball and track and field. In football, he was a standout quarterback, wide receiver, cornerback and return specialist. He played wide receiver and cornerback for an undefeated Timpson team as a freshman that won the district championship, and as a sophomore in 2021, he was named the district MVP. As a junior, he was starting quarterback, throwing for 2,177 yards and running for 2,596 yards while accounting for 72 total touchdowns. He recorded 115 tackles on defense and four interceptions returned four touchdowns and also had four kick and punt return touchdowns, while leading Timpson to the Class 2A state semifinals.

His performance came despite Bussey having suffered an undiagnosed torn meniscus early in the season. He received the Texas Mr. Football Award and was the first junior to receive the award since Kyler Murray; Bussey was also selected the district MVP and the TSWA Class 2A Offensive Player of the Year. After the football season, he competed in track and won the state triple jump title, and he was also named the district MVP in basketball for his junior year. He missed several games to open his senior year due to his injury from his junior season, but came back in at quarterback on the final drive of Timpson's third game and scored the game-winning touchdown. That year, he helped Timpson compile an undefeated 16–0 record while winning the state championship, throwing for 2,691 yards and 36 touchdowns while running for 1,585 yards and 24 touchdowns, being named the Class 2A Offensive Player of the Year and a finalist for the Mr. Football Award; he was also district MVP for the third straight year. He finished his high school career with 5,981 passing yards, 5,631 rushing yards and 169 touchdowns accounted for, while recording 270 tackles and 24 interceptions on defense. He set the records for longest passing touchdown and longest rushing touchdown in the state championship game and was invited to the Under Armour All-America Game as well as the Polynesian Bowl. A five-star prospect, the top-ranked athlete and one of the best overall players in the class of 2024, he committed to play college football for the Texas A&M Aggies.

== College career ==
Bussey was viewed as a potential wide receiver or cornerback when he enrolled at Texas A&M. He was used as a wide receiver during the 2024 season and appeared in 12 games. He caught 13 passes for 179 yards and also ran for 97 yards and two touchdowns.
