= John Chiles =

American gridiron football player (born 1988)

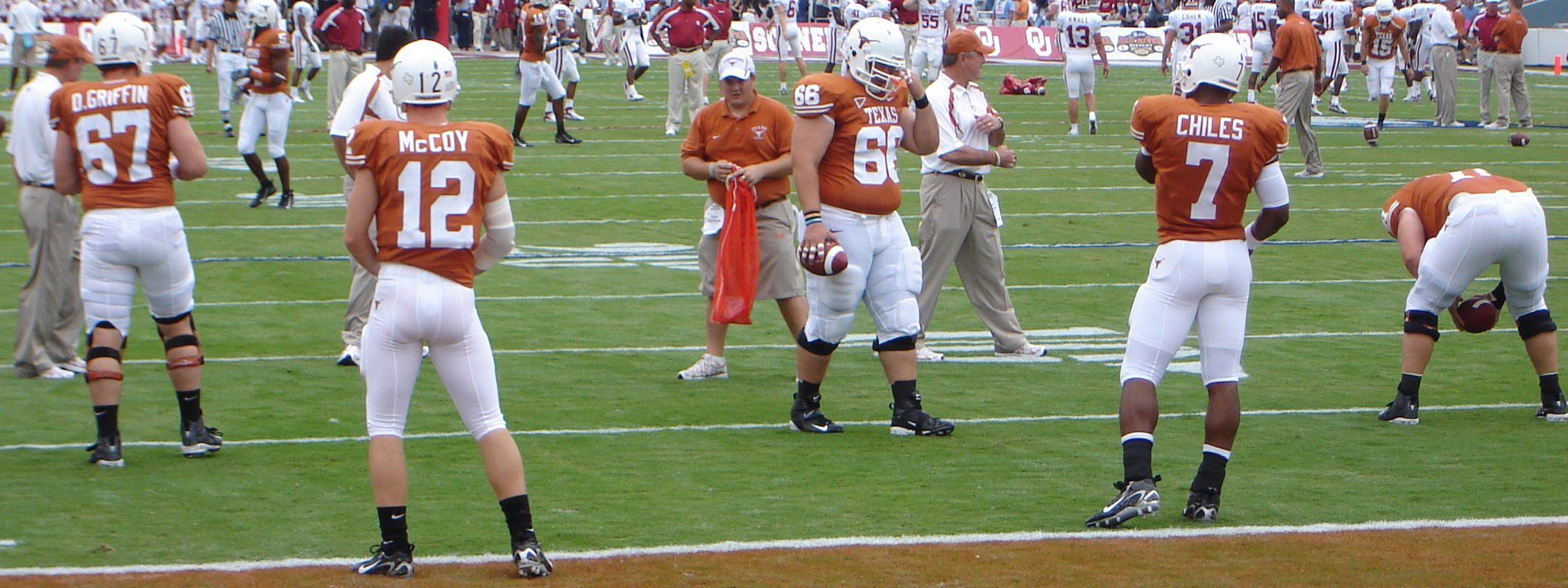
- Chiles (7) with Colt McCoy before the Red River Shootout in 2007

No. 12, 15
- Position: Wide receiver

Personal information
- Born: October 9, 1988 (age 38); Dallas, Texas, U.S.
- Listed height: 6 ft 2 in (1.88 m)
- Listed weight: 215 lb (98 kg)

Career information
- High school: Mansfield (TX) Summit
- College: Texas
- NFL draft: 2011: undrafted

Career history
- New Orleans Saints (2011)*; Jacksonville Sharks (2011–2012)*; St. Louis Rams (2011)*; Toronto Argonauts (2013–2014); Chicago Bears (2015)*; Saskatchewan Roughriders (2016); Hamilton Tiger-Cats (2016)
- * Offseason or practice squad member only

Awards and highlights
- Big 12 Champion - 2009; 2009 Fiesta Bowl Champion; 2007 Holiday Bowl Champion
- Stats at Pro Football Reference
- Stats at CFL.ca (archive)
- Stats at ArenaFan.com

John Chiles (born October 9, 1988) is an American former professional football wide receiver. He played three years of professional football in the Canadian Football League, and spent time over three seasons with NFL and Arena Football teams. Prior to that he played college football at Texas.

He was at times a member of the New Orleans Saints, St. Louis Rams, Jacksonville Sharks, Toronto Argonauts, Chicago Bears, Saskatchewan Roughriders and Hamilton Tiger-Cats.

== Early life ==
Chiles attended Mansfield Summit High School in Arlington, Texas. He was a prep All-American and two-time district 4-5A MVP who was also a four-time honor roll student. During his four years in high school, he was a starter for three years; at both quarterback and wide receiver. In his final two years in high school, he totaled 2,036 yards passing, 694 yards receiving, 1,248 yards rushing. He finished his high school career in the 2007 U.S. Army All-American Bowl.

Chiles was a highly touted recruit out of high school. ESPN and Dave Campbell's Texas Football listed him on their top recruits list. Athlon Sports listed him at wide receiver position and ranked him the 31st best recruit in 2007.

Besides playing football, Chiles also lettered three years in basketball and two years in track and field.

== College career ==
Chiles played college football at the University of Texas from 2007-2010. He had been expected to redshirt his freshman year, but an injury to Sherrod Harris forced him into the backup role behind freshman Colt McCoy. He started as a quarterback, and during his freshman and sophomore years he played in 18 games in which he ran the ball more than he threw it - and sometimes lined up at both running back and receiver. He carried the ball 81 times for 322 yards and 4 TDs. Passing he went 12 for 22 for 166 yards, 2 touchdowns and no interceptions. He also had a 9 yard reception. He played in the 2007 Holiday Bowl where he also ran for a touchdown. In 2007 he was named a UT Outstanding Offensive Newcomer. In 2008 he helped the team win a share of the Big 12 South and a trip to the Fiesta Bowl, which they won.

Prior to the 2009 Spring Game he moved from QB to WR. As a WR over the next two seasons he caught 63 passes for 737 yards and 4 touchdowns and got his first starts. He also had 2 rushes for 18 yards. In his junior year, the Longhorns won the Big 12 and went to the 2010 BCS National Championship Game. He missed the last game of the season and the Big 12 Championship Game with an ankle injury and though he was healthy for the BCS championship he recorded no stats and did not come in for an injured Colt McCoy, with the quarterback duties handled by Garrett Gilbert.

In his senior year, he started in 8 games, though he missed the Texas Tech game with an injury and recorded no stats in two other games as the Longhorns struggled to a 5-7 record. During his senior year he had a career high 117-yard receiving game, on 5 receptions including a 46 yarder against Iowa State. He led the team with 14.4 yards per receptions.

He graduated with a degree in corporate communications and was on the UT Athletic Director's Honor Roll.

== Professional career ==
=== New Orleans Saints ===
Chiles was undrafted but he was signed by the New Orleans Saints, after the lockout, on July 27, 2011 and was waived at the end of camp on August 30th.

=== Jacksonville Sharks ===
In October of 2011 Chiles joined the Arena Football League and was assigned to the Jacksonville Sharks. When he was signed by the Rams, he was exempted from the Arena League. At the end of the NFL season he was activated but he never reported to the Sharks training camp.

=== St. Louis Rams ===
Chiles was signed to the St. Louis Rams practice squad on November 30, 2011. He became a free agent at the end of the season, was re-signed by the Rams in January 2012 and then waived in February.

=== Toronto Argonauts ===
On May 10, 2013, Chiles signed with the Toronto Argonauts of the Canadian Football League. Over the 2013-2014 seasons he had 73 receptions for 1200 yards and 9 touchdowns and helped the Argonauts reach the 2013 Eastern Conference finals. His playing time was limited due to multiple injuries, but he was nonetheless the team's nominee for CFL rookie of the year.

=== Chicago Bears ===
On January 27, 2015, Chiles was signed by the Chicago Bears to a reserve/future contract. He suffered a concussion during camp, was waived/injured on August 30, 2015 and then released in November.

=== Saskatchewan Roughriders ===
On February 9, 2016, Chiles signed with the Saskatchewan Roughriders. He only saw action in the first three of the Riders’ eight games, collecting 135 yards and 3 touchdowns on 10 receptions, before he was released by the team on August 24, 2016. No reason was given for his release at the time, though he had been put on League Suspension twice in the prior month.

=== Hamilton Tiger-Cats ===
On September 1, 2016, Chiles signed with the Hamilton Tiger-Cats. After spending some time on the injured list, he was moved to the active roster on September 22nd. He played in 5 of the last 6 regular season games for the Tiger-Cats, recording 172 yards receiving on 20 receptions with 2 TDs. On February 14, 2017 he became a free agent.

== Later life ==
Following the end of his football career, Chiles became a producer and director of commercials, docuseries and TV series for companies like Bleacher Report and SpringHill Company.
