= Johnathan Gray =

American football player (born 1993)

No. 32
- Position: Running back

Personal information
- Born: April 22, 1993 (age 33); Aledo, Texas, U.S.
- Listed height: 5 ft 11 in (1.80 m)
- Listed weight: 207 lb (94 kg)

Career information
- High school: Aledo
- College: Texas (2012–2015)
- NFL draft: 2016: undrafted

Career history
- Frisco Fighters (2021)

Awards and highlights
- Gatorade National Men's Athlete of the Year (2012); Gatorade National Player of the Year (2012); 2011 USA Today High School All-American (2011); Mr. Texas Football (2011)

Johnathan Gray (born April 22, 1993) is an American former football running back. He played for the Frisco Fighters of the Indoor Football League (IFL) in 2021. He played college football for the University of Texas at Austin. He attended Aledo High School in Aledo, Texas. Gray earned a 2011 USA Today High School All-American nomination, and was also named Gatorade National Player of the Year. After becoming the first junior to win ESPN HS's Mr. Football USA, he became the first two-time winner of the award following the 2011 high school football season.

Gray chose the University of Texas over Arkansas, Auburn, TCU, and Texas A&M.

== Early life ==
Gray attended Aledo High School in Aledo, Texas, where he broke the all-time high school touchdown record with 205 eclipsing Mike Hart's record of 204 touchdowns. As a junior, he rushed for 323 yards and eight touchdowns in the Texas Class 4A Division II championship game against La Marque High School on December 17 at Cowboys Stadium, which gave him a total of 59 rushing touchdowns for the 2010 high school football season and surpassed Kenneth Hall's single-season record of 57 set in 1953. Gray had rushed for 252 yards and four touchdowns in the 2009 state championship victory over Brenham High School. In 2011, Gray led Aledo to its third straight state championship with 241 rushing yards. Along the way, he scored his 205th touchdown establishing the national high school career record. He finished his high school career first all-time in touchdowns and second all-time in points scored.

High school rushing stats
Year	Attempts	Yards	Average	Touchdowns
2008	140	969	6.9	15
2009	372	2,798	7.5	50
2010	351	3,223	9.2	59
2011	346	3,891	11.2	65
Total	1,209	10,881	8.7	189

Gray was also on the school's track & field team, where he competed as a sprinter. He was a 3 time district champion in the 100-meter dash. As a junior in 2009, he won the 100 meters at the 4th Johnny Perkins Pirate Relays, with a career-best time of 10.58 seconds. He also competed in the 200 meters, placing fifth at the 2009 Elk Relays.

College recruiting
Name	Hometown	School	Height	Weight	40^{‡}	Commit date
Johnathan Gray; RB	Aledo, Texas	Aledo HS	5 ft 10 in (1.78 m)	195 lb (88 kg)	4.53	Apr 22, 2011
Johnathan Gray; RB	Recruit ratings: Scout: Rivals: (85)					
Overall recruit ranking: Scout: 1 (RB) Rivals: 1 (RB) ESPN: 1 (RB)
Note: In many cases, Scout, Rivals, 247Sports, On3, and ESPN may conflict in their listings of height and weight.; In these cases, the average was taken. ESPN grades are on a 100-point scale.; Sources: "2012 Team Ranking". Rivals.com.

== College career ==
Gray tore his right Achilles tendon in 2013, and his left Achilles in 2015. The tendon tears put Gray's career on hold, and Gray went undrafted in the 2016 NFL draft.

=== College statistics ===
Year	GP–GS	Rushing					Receiving				
Year	GP–GS	Att	Yds	Avg	TD	Long	Rec	Rec–Yards	Avg	TD	Long
2012	13-5	149	701	4.7	3	49	11	151	13.7	1	34
2013	9-8	159	780	4.9	4	45	15	61	4.1	0	10
2014	13–13	147	637	4.3	7	42	20	122	6.1	0	17
2015	11–11	123	489	4.3	3	46	6	84	14.0	0	26
Totals	43-36	578	2607	4.5	17	49	52	418	8.0	1	34

== Professional career ==
Despite being injured while preparing for the draft, several NFL teams showed interest in Gray as a free agent following the draft. In 2017, after demonstrating a 4.5-second 40-yard dash and a 36-inch vertical leap at the annual Texas Pro Day workout, Gray landed a tryout with the New York Giants. After attending the Giants' rookie camp, Gray received went to rookie camps for the Calgary Stampeders, Winnipeg Blue Bombers and Saskatchewan Roughriders of the Canadian Football League; however, Gray ultimately never played for any of them.

For some time he was running track professionally and training kids in Fort Worth.

On April 8, 2021, the Frisco Fighters announced that they had signed Gray for the 2021 season. He spent one season with the team, though recorded no stats; helping them to a league-best 15-3 record and into the second round of the playoffs.

== Coaching ==
Following his one season in the IFL, he retired as a player and became an assistant coach for his alma mater Aledo High School.
