= Malcolm Williams (American football) =

American football player (born 1987)

No. 41
- Position: Cornerback/Safety

Personal information
- Born: November 22, 1987 (age 38); Grand Prairie, Texas, U.S.
- Listed height: 5 ft 11 in (1.80 m)
- Listed weight: 205 lb (93 kg)

Career information
- High school: South Grand Prairie
- College: TCU
- NFL draft: 2011: 7th round, 219th overall pick

Career history
- New England Patriots (2011–2012); Colorado Ice (2014); New Orleans VooDoo (2015); Nebraska Danger (2015)

Career NFL statistics
- Total tackles: 2
- Stats at Pro Football Reference

Malcolm Williams (born November 22, 1987) is an American former professional football player who was a cornerback in the National Football League (NFL). He played college football for the TCU Horned Frogs.

== College career ==
He played college football at Texas Christian University.

== Professional career ==
Pre-draft measurables
Height	Weight	40-yard dash	10-yard split	20-yard split	20-yard shuttle	Three-cone drill	Vertical jump	Broad jump	Bench press
5 ft 9 5/8 in (1.77 m)	204 lb (93 kg)	4.47 s	1.48 s	2.56 s	4.39 s	6.90 s	40.0 in (1.02 m)	10 ft 6 in (3.20 m)	16 reps
All values from Pro Day

=== New England Patriots ===
Williams was selected by the New England Patriots with the 219th overall pick in the seventh round of the 2011 NFL draft. On April 29, 2013, he was released by the Patriots.

=== Colorado Ice ===
Williams played for the Colorado Ice of the Indoor Football League (IFL) in 2014.

=== New Orleans VooDoo ===
On October 28, 2014, Williams was assigned to the New Orleans VooDoo. He was later placed on league suspension by the VooDoo.

=== Nebraska Danger ===
On April 15, 2015, Williams signed with the Nebraska Danger of the IFL.
