= Timpson High School =

Location
- 836 Bear Drive; Timpson, Texas 75975-0370; United States; 31.906945°N 94.389894°W

Information
- School type: Public High School
- School district: Timpson Independent School District
- Principal: Jason Crow
- Staff: 72.00 (on an FTE basis)
- Grades: 9–12
- Enrollment: 226 (2023–24)
- Student to teacher ratio: 9.96
- Colors: Black & Gold
- Athletics conference: UIL Class AA
- Mascot: Bear
- Website: Timpson High School

Timpson High School is a public high school located in Timpson, Texas (USA) and classified as a 2A school by the UIL. It is part of the Timpson Independent School District located in northwest Shelby County. In 2015, the school was rated "Met Standard" by the Texas Education Agency.

== Athletics ==
The Timpson Bears compete in these sports -

- Baseball
- Basketball
- Cross Country
- Football
- Powerlifting
- Softball
- Track and Field
- Volleyball

=== State Titles ===
- Boys Track
  - 1917(B), 1974(1A), 1979(1A)
- Football
  - 2023(2A/D1)

== Notable alumni ==
- Terry Bussey, college football wide receiver
